= FC Shahrixon =

Shaxrixonchi
- Full name: Shaxrixonchi
- Founded: 1926
- Ground: Andijan FA Stadium
- Capacity: 8,500
- Owner: Andijan Football Association
- League: Uzbekistan Second League
Home colours	Away colours

Shahrixon is a Soviet and Uzbek football club from the city of Shahrixon, Andijan Region. The club was founded in 1926.

== History ==
In 1968, the club finished 2nd in the Soviet Second League and also took 2nd place in the "Central Asia" tournament of the First League. The club was known by several names during its history. From 1967 to 1970 and 2007–2008 it was called Oq Oltin. Between 1975 and 1988 it was known as Shakhrikhanets. In the 1975–1988, 1993–2007, 2009–2010 and 2011–2016 the club used the name Shakhrikhon, while in 1991–1992 it was called Shahrixonchi. From 2019 to 2024 the club was purchased by Rash-Milk, one of the largest dairy product manufacturers in Central Asia, located in Shahrixon District. From 2024 club operates by Andijan Regional Football Association. In 2017 became the champion of Andijan region under the name "Shahrikhan-1926". In the 2025 season, it took part in the "1st League Tournament" held in Jizzakh.

=== Team names ===
The evolution of the club's name over the years

- 1951 – Moskovsky
- 1967–1970 – Oq-oltin (Moskovskiy)
- 1975–1988 – Shahrixanets
- 1991–1992 – Shahrixonchi
- 1993–2007 – Shahrixon
- 2008 – Oq-oltin
- 2009–2010 – Rash-Milk
- 2011–2016 – Shahrixon
- 2019–2020 – Rash-Milk
- 2022 – Shahrixonchi

== Honours ==
- Uzbek League – 15th place (1992)
- Soviet Second League – 2nd place in the "Central Asia" zone (1968)
- Soviet Cup – Zone semi-final (1967/68)
- Uzbekistan Pro League – 4th place

== Notable managers ==
- 1970 – Vitaliy Suyunov
- 1977–1979 – Nikolay Mednikh
- 1979 – Birodar Abduraimov
- 1980 – Galimzyan Husainov
- 1981–1982 – Aleksey Stepanov
- 1982–1983 – Toʻlagan Isoqov
- 1984–1985 – Enver Sitiya
- 1985 – Oleksandr Averyanov
- 1990–1991 – Rustam Osmonov
- 1991 – Ravil Bagauddinov
- 1992 – Vladimir Enns
- 1992 – Nerd Ayriyev
- Rahimjon Moʻminov
- 1998–2000 – Avxat Abdulin
- 2007 – Toir Shoev
