= 2023 Uzbekistan First League =

Uzbekistan First League
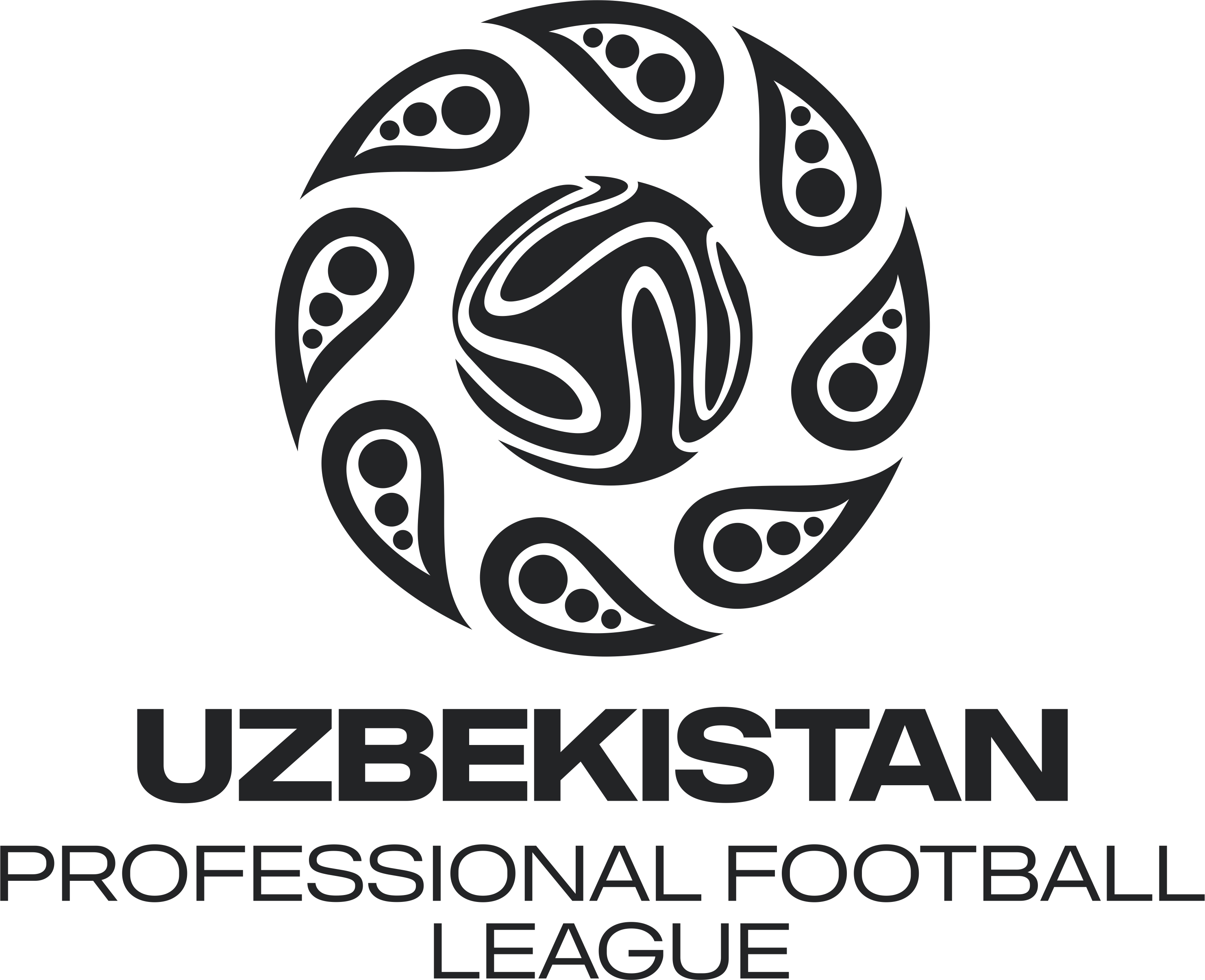
- Logo
- Season: 2023
- Dates: 12 April – 28 September 2023
- Country: Uzbekistan
- Teams: 15
- Champions: Yangiyer
- Relegated: Kumkurgan-1977
- Matches: 136
- Goals: 310 (2.28 per match)
- Top goalscorer: Tohir Rafaelov (11 goals)
- Biggest home win: Jizzakh 7-1 Lokomotiv BFK (24.09.2023)
- Biggest away win: Nasaf-2 2-6 Jizzakh (9 April 2023)
- Highest scoring: Zomin 6-2 Qumqo‘rg‘on-1977 (10 September 2023)
- Highest attendance: 4908 (Pakhtakor-79 1-0 Lokomotiv BFK, 7 May 2023, Kimyogar Stadium)

The First Football League of Uzbekistan 2023 (in Uzbek: Futbol boʻyicha 2023-yilgi Oʻzbekiston Birinchi ligasi) is the fourth season of the First League of Uzbekistan. Yangiyer of Sirdaryo Region became the winner of the competition.

== Season events ==
On August 5, 2023, the Bukhara team Nurafshon-Bukhara was excluded from the list of participants of the season due to financial difficulties on the basis of an official letter from the club. All results of Nurafshon team in the League (10 games) were annulled.

Yangiyul did not attend the guest match of the 14th round of Uzbekistan First League against Nasaf-Farm due to financial difficulties, and according to the regulations, the team was awarded a technical defeat (3:0). In the guest game of the round of 16 against Bunyodkor Farm, Yangiyul's team also failed to show up and suffered a technical defeat. On September 21, 2023, the Yangiyul team was excluded from the list of participants, and the results of the team were annulled regardless of how many games it played. Exclusions and penalties imposed on the team remained in effect.

== Teams ==
Club	City	Region	Coach	Stadium
Bunyodkor-2	Tashkent	Tashkent Region	(Uzbekistan) Samat Narzikulov	Bunyodkor
Nasaf-2	Qarshi	Qashqadaryo Region	(Uzbekistan) Eldor Moyliev	Mehnatchi
Dustlik	Tashkent	Tashkent Region	(Uzbekistan) Shukhrat Kurbanov	
Sementchi	Quvasoy	Fergana Region	(Uzbekistan) Murad Ismailov	Sementchi
Olimpia	Tashkent		(Uzbekistan) Shavkat Mullajanov	RORC
Khotira-79	Angren	Tashkent Region		Kimyogar
Shakhrikhon	Shahrixon	Andijan Region	(Uzbekistan) Makhmudjon Matkarimov	Shakhrikhan
Zaamin	Zomin	Jizzakh Region	(Uzbekistan) Askar Umarov	Zaamin
Yangiyul	Yangiyoʻl	Tashkent Region	(Uzbekistan) Andrey Snetkov	Chigatoy
Nurafshon	Bukhara	Bukhara Region	(Uzbekistan) Kamil Samiev	Gijduvan
Lokomotiv BFK	Tashkent		(Uzbekistan) Ravshan Akhmedov	Tashkent FA
Yangier	Yangiyer	Sirdaryo Region		Gulistan and Yangier stadiums
Jizzakh	Jizzakh	Jizzakh Region	(Uzbekistan) Sunnatilla Yakubov	
Olympic Farm	Tashkent		(Uzbekistan) Farhad Nishanov	Jar
Jaykhun	Jaykhun	Karakalpakstan	(Uzbekistan) Marat Auezniyazov	Nukus FA
Chigatoy	Tashkent District	Tashkent Region	(Uzbekistan) Dmitry Kim	Chigatoy
Kumkurgan-1977	Qumqoʻrgʻon	Surxondaryo Region	(Uzbekistan) Kholmirza Ergashev	Alpamysh Stadium

== Table of tournament ==
Pos	Team	Pld	W	D	L	GF	GA	GD	Pts	Promotion, qualification or relegation
1	Yangiyer-quruvchi	14	11	1	2	32	14	+18	34	Promotion to 2024 Uzbekistan Pro League
2	Jizzakh	14	9	4	1	34	14	+20	31	
3	Olimpiya	14	8	2	4	27	21	+6	26	
4	Lokomotiv BFK	14	8	2	4	24	23	+1	26	
5	Zomin	14	7	4	3	36	22	+14	25	
6	Pakhtakor-79	14	6	3	5	14	12	+2	21	
7	Dustlik Tashkent	14	6	2	6	22	24	−2	20	
8	Nasaf Farm	14	5	4	5	22	23	−1	19	
9	Jaykhun	14	5	3	6	20	23	−3	18	
10	Olimpik-Farm	14	5	2	7	20	19	+1	17	
11	Chigʻatoy	14	5	2	7	20	20	0	17	
12	Sementchi	14	4	5	5	17	21	−4	17	
13	Bunyodkor Farm	14	2	4	8	12	21	−9	10	
14	Shahrixonchi	14	3	1	10	10	34	−24	10	
15	Kumkurgan-1977	14	1	3	10	10	29	−19	6	Relegation to 2024 Uzbekistan Second League

Updated to match(es) played on unknown. Source: Uzbekistan Professional Football League
Rules for classification: 1) Ochko; 2) Head-to-head points; 3) Head-to-head goal difference; 4) Head-to-head goals scored; 5) Goal difference; 6) Goals scored; .

== Results ==
Home \ Away	BUN	DOS	JAY	JIZ	KUM	LOK	NAS	OLM	OLY	PAK	SEM	YAN	ZOM	SHA	CHI
Bunyodkor Farm	—	1–1		1–1	0–0		0–3			2–0			0–3	2–0	
Doʻstlik Toshkent		—			2–0	3–2			2–1	1–2		3–1	3–4	2–1	
Jayxun	1–0	2–1	—	0–1			3–0	5–2			1–1				0–0
Jizzax Zvezda Boʻston		3–0		—	3–0	7–1			1–0	2–1			0–0	3–0	
Kumkurgan-1977			1–2		—	0–1		0–2	0–1	1–1	2–2	1–0			
Lokomotiv BFK	1–0		3–2			—	1–1	2–2			2–0	1–2			2–0
Nasaf Farm		1–3		2–6	4–2		—		1–1	0–0			2–2	3–0	
Olimpiya	3–2	4–1		2–2			2–1	—			3–2			1–2	1–0
Olimpik-Farm	0–0		4–2			0–1		0–2	—		2–1	1–2			2–3
Pakhtakor-79			2–0			1–0		1–0	1–2	—	1–0			1–0	1–2
Sementchi	3–2	0–0		2–2			0–1				—		2–1	1–0	1–1
Yangiyer-quruvchi	2–0	2–1	5–0	4–1			2–1	2–0		0–2	3–2	—			2–0
Zomin			2–1		6–2	4–5		1–3	3–0	1–1		3–3	—	4–0	
Shahrixonchi			1–1		3–0	1–2			0–6			1–3		—	
Chigʻatoy	3–2	1–2		1–2	2–1		1–2						0–2	6–0	—

Updated to match(es) played on 24-sentyabr 2023-yil. Source: Championat.asia
Legend: Blue = home team win; Yellow = draw; Red = away team win.

=== Results by played games ===
Team ╲ Round	1	2	3	4	5	6	7	8	9	10	11	12	13	14	15	16	17
Bunyodkor Farm	D	P	D	L	L	D	P	W	L	D	L	L	L	W	L	P	L
Doʻstlik Toshkent	D	L	W	W	D	L	L	W	L	P	L	P	P	L	W	W	W
Jayxun	W	D	L	W	D	P	P	L	W	P	L	L	W	L	W	L	D
Kumkurgan-1977	L	P	W	L	P	L	L	L	L	D	D	L	P	D	L	L	L
Lokomotiv BFK	P	D	W	W	L	W	W	W	W	D	W	W	P	L	L	P	L
Nasaf Farm	L	D	P	D	W	D	W	W	W	D	L	W	L	P	L	L	P
Olimpiya	W	P	L	L	P	L	W	P	D	D	W	W	W	L	W	W	W
Olimpik-Farm	P	L	L	D	P	D	W	L	W	W	L	L	W	W	P	L	L
Pakhtakor-79	W	W	P	L	W	D	L	L	P	L	D	W	D	W	L	W	P
Sementchi	W	D	P	L	D	P	D	L	L	L	W	L	D	D	P	W	L
Yangiyer-quruvchi	L	W	L	W	D	W	W	W	P	P	W	P	W	W	W	W	W
Zomin	L	W	W	P	D	W	P	D	L	D	W	W	D	W	W	L	P
Shahrixonchi	L	L	W	P	D	L	L	L	P	L	L	L	L	L	W	L	W
Chigʻatoy	P	L	L	P	L	L	L	W	W	W	P	W	D	L	L	W	D
Jizzax Zvezda Boʻston	W	W	D	W	W	W	D	D	D	W	W	W	L	W	P	P	W

Updated to match(es) played on 24 September 2023. Source: Championat.asia
W = Win; D = Draw; L = Loss; P = Postponed

== Toʻpurarlar ==
No.	Futbolchi	Klub	Gollar
1.	(Uzbekistan) Tohir Rafaelov	Yangiyer	10
1.	(Uzbekistan) Samandar Qodirov	Olimpiya	10
2.	(Uzbekistan) Orifxoʻja Abduxoliqov	Orifxoʻja Abduxoliqov	9
2.	(Uzbekistan) Abdugʻafur Haydarov	Olimpik-Farm	9
4.	(Uzbekistan) Murodxoʻja Jabborov	Jizzax	7
4.	(Uzbekistan) Abdurahmon Abdullayev	Olimpik-Farm	7
4.	(Uzbekistan) Rasul Musayev	Jayxun	7
4.	(Uzbekistan) Xolmurod Xolmurodov	Zomin	7
5.	(Uzbekistan) Naimjon Otayorov	Chigʻatoy	6
5.	(Uzbekistan) Shuhrat Sadirdinov	Zomin	6
5.	(Uzbekistan) Abdumutal Tursunqulov	Yangiyer	6
5.	(Uzbekistan) Abdulaziz Rahimov	Doʻstlik	6
6.	(Uzbekistan) Alisher Azizov	Doʻstlik	5
6.	(Uzbekistan) Navroʻzbek Iminjonov	Olimpiya	5
6.	(Uzbekistan) Javohir Shokirov	Nasaf Farm	5
7.	(Uzbekistan) Sanjar Rashidov	Jizzax	4

== Play-off ==
30 November 2023	Yangiyer	2 – 1	Bunyodkor Farm	Tashkent
(UTC+5) 15:00	Asqaraliyev 38'; Abduhalilov 82' (pen.)	Report	Gulyamov 42'	Stadium: Bunyodkor Stadium; Referee: Shavkat Nasibullayev
