= Qoʻchqor Turdiyev =

- Қўчқор Аҳмедович Турдиев
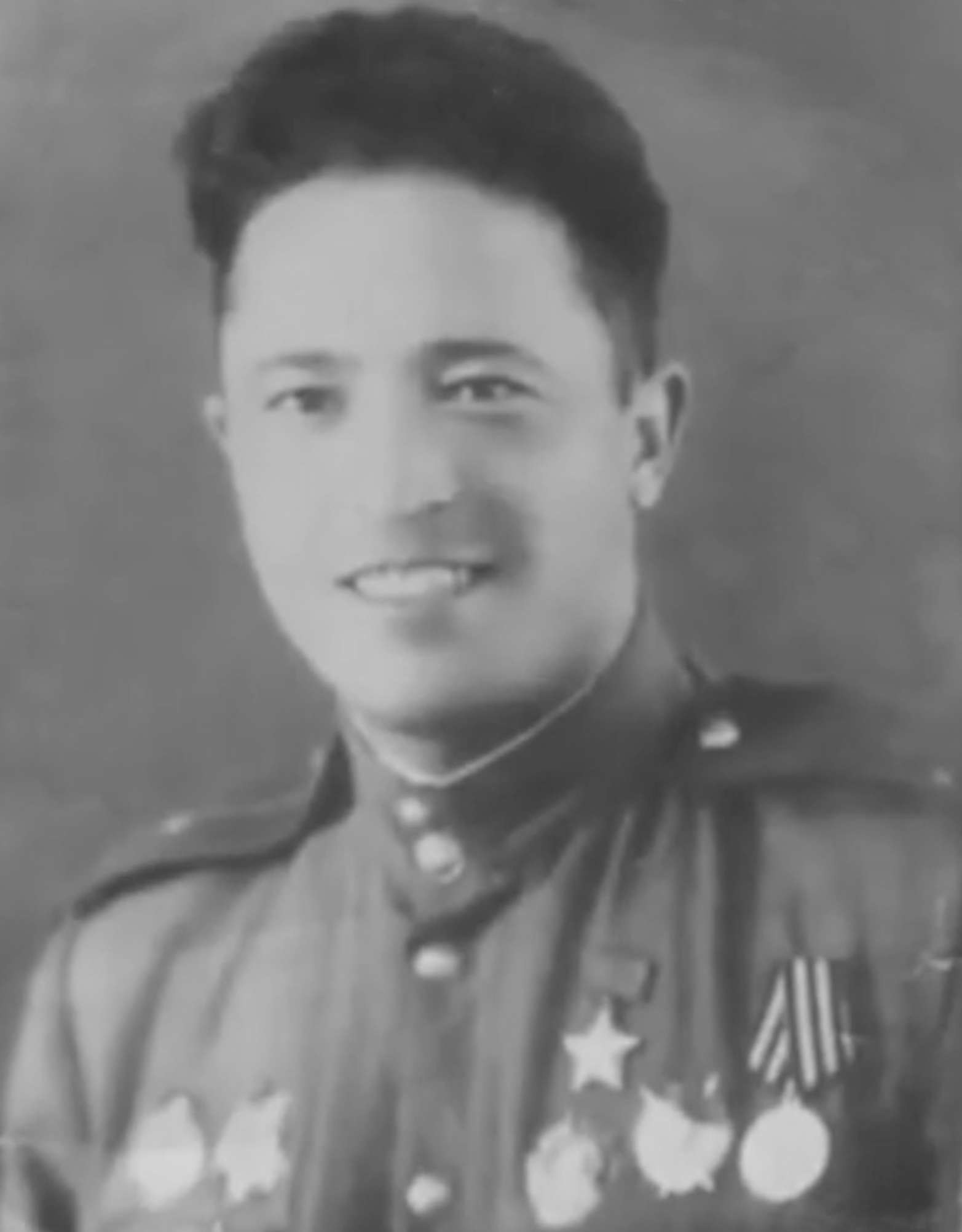
- Born: 1 September 1917; Dardoq, Qoʻrgʻontepa District, Russian Turkestan (now Uzbekistan)
- Died: 4 August 1992 (aged 74); Oyim, Jalaquduq District, Uzbekistan
- Military career
- Allegiance: Soviet Union
- Branch: Red Army
- Rank: Lieutenant
- Awards: Hero of the Soviet Union

Qoʻchqor Ahmedovich Turdiyev (Note: Occasionally spelled Durdiyev. His name is written in Russian as Кочкар Ахмедович Дурдиев, romanized Kochkar Akhmedovich Durdiev, or alternatively Кочкар Ахмедович Турдиев, romanized as Kochkar Akhmedovich Turdiev) (1 September 1917—4 August 1992) was a Soviet soldier in the Red Army who was awarded the title Hero of the Soviet Union on 27 March 1942 for bravery during World War II. He was the first Uzbek awarded the title Hero of the Soviet Union.

== Early life ==
Turdiyev was born on 1 September 1917 to an Uzbek peasant family in Dardoq village. After finishing elementary school he worked on a collective farm before entering the Red Army in 1940. He was a member of the Komsomol.

== World War II ==
In September 1941 Turdiyev entered combat in World War II as a private in the 353rd Mountain Rifle Regiment. On 15 October 1941 (Note: An article in Sovet Oʻzbekistoni indicates the date of his feat was 26 October 1941.) he distinguished himself in battle; his company encountered an enemy bunker firing a machine gun at them from a distance. Given orders to destroy the bunker, the squad leader and five other soldiers were wounded in the process of approaching the bunker, but Turdiyev managed to reach the bunker. Surprising the German soldiers inside the bunker, he first opened fire with his rifle, killing the soldiers in the bunker. As more German soldiers approached the bunker he grabbed up the rifle of one of the dead enemy soldiers and started shooting at the approaching German soldiers, killing four more before throwing a round of grenades and subsequently taking two prisoners. Successful in destroying the bunker, Turdiyev regrouped with the rest of his company and continued with the rest of the mission. For his feat he was awarded the title Hero of the Soviet Union on 27 March 1942. His photo was frequently featured on the cover of Pravda Vostoka in 1942. That year he graduated from junior lieutenant courses, and went on to graduate from the Gomel Infantry School in 1943 and proceeded to command an infantry platoon and later a company.

== Postwar ==
After the war, Turdiyev was demobilized from the military with the rank of senior lieutenant and returned to Uzbekistan, where he worked on a State Farm as a vegetable grower and later headed a rice farming brigade. He died on 4 August 1992.

== Awards ==
- Hero of the Soviet Union (27 March 1942)
- Order of Lenin (27 March 1942)
- Order of the Red Banner (4 March 1942)
- Order of the Patriotic War 1st and 2nd class (11 March 1985 and 29 September 1944)
- campaign and jubilee medals
