= Kurgontepa =

Kurgontepa may refer to:

- Qurghonteppa, a city in Tajikistan
- Ķürgontepa, a city in Uzbekistan
- Kurgontepa District, a district of Uzbekistan
