= Oltinkol =

Oltinkol or Oltinkoʻl may refer to the following places in Uzbekistan:

- Oltinkoʻl, Andijan Region
- Oltinkoʻl District, Andijan Region
- Oltinkoʻl, Karakalpakstan
