= Boz =

Boz, BoZ or BOZ may refer to:

- Boz (name), a list of people and fictional characters with this nickname, given name or surname

Additionally, it can refer to:

== Geography ==
- Boz, Ain, a French commune
- Boz (Mureș), a river in Hunedoara County, Romania
- Boz (Secaș), a river in Alba County, Romania
- Boz, a village in Doștat Commune, Alba County, Romania
- Boz, a village in Brănișca Commune, Hunedoara County, Romania
- Boʻz, a settlement in Andijan Region, Uzbekistan
- Boʻz District, former name of Boʻston District, Uzbekistan

== Other uses ==
- Bank of Zambia (BoZ), Zambia's national bank
- BoZ, a fictional rock band in Shaman King, a Japanese manga series
- Blood of Zeus, an anime series.
- Boz, danewort (Sambucus ebulus), or colorant made from the fruits of that plant
- Boz (album), Boz Scaggs' 1965 debut album
- BOZ counter-measures pod, used on the Panavia Tornado combat aircraft
- .224 Boz, a firearm cartridge
- BOZ, IATA airport code for Bozoum Airport, Bozoum, Central African Republic

== See also ==
- Bergen op Zoom, a city in the Netherlands
