= Dardoq =

Dardoq Dardog' Dardak
- Village
- Location in Uzbekistan
- Coordinates: 40°48′56″N 72°49′52″E
- Country: Uzbekistan
- Region: Andijan Region
- District: Qoʻrgʻontepa District

Population (2015)
  - Total: 26,055
- Time zone: UTC+5 (UZT)

Dardoq (Uzbek: Dardoq / Дардоқ or Dardok / Дардок, Russian: Дардак, romanized: Dardak) is a village and a rural community in Qoʻrgʻontepa District, in Andijan Region in eastern Uzbekistan. It is situated near the confluence of the rivers Kögart and Kara Darya, 6 km south of Dostuk (Kyrgyzstan), 12 km west of Xonobod and 32 km north of Osh (Kyrgyzstan). In 2015 it had a population of 26,055.
