= Sultonobod, Uzbekistan =

Sultonobod
- urban-type settlement
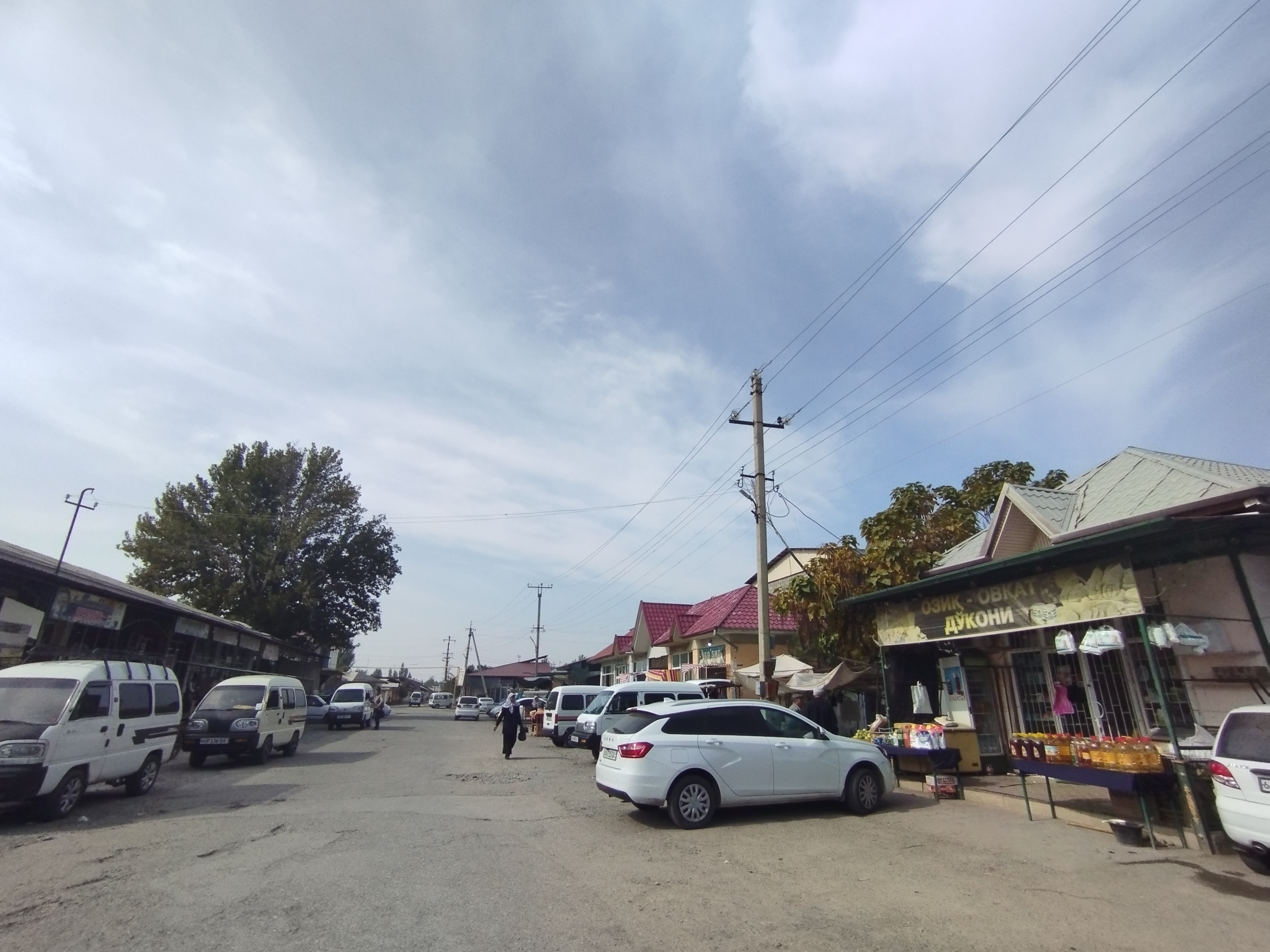

- Location in Uzbekistan
- Coordinates: 40°45′52″N 72°58′35″E
- Country: Uzbekistan
- Region: Andijan Region
- District: Qoʻrgʻontepa District
- Urban-type settlement: 2009

Population (2016)
  - Total: 20,000
- Time zone: UTC+5 (UZT)

Sultonobod (Uzbek: Sultonobod / Султонобод, Russian: Султанабад, romanized: Sultanabad) is an urban-type settlement in Andijan Region, Uzbekistan. It is part of Qoʻrgʻontepa District. Its population is 20,000 (2016).
