= Otabek Mahkamov =

Uzbek actor, lawyer, and internet personality (born 1984)

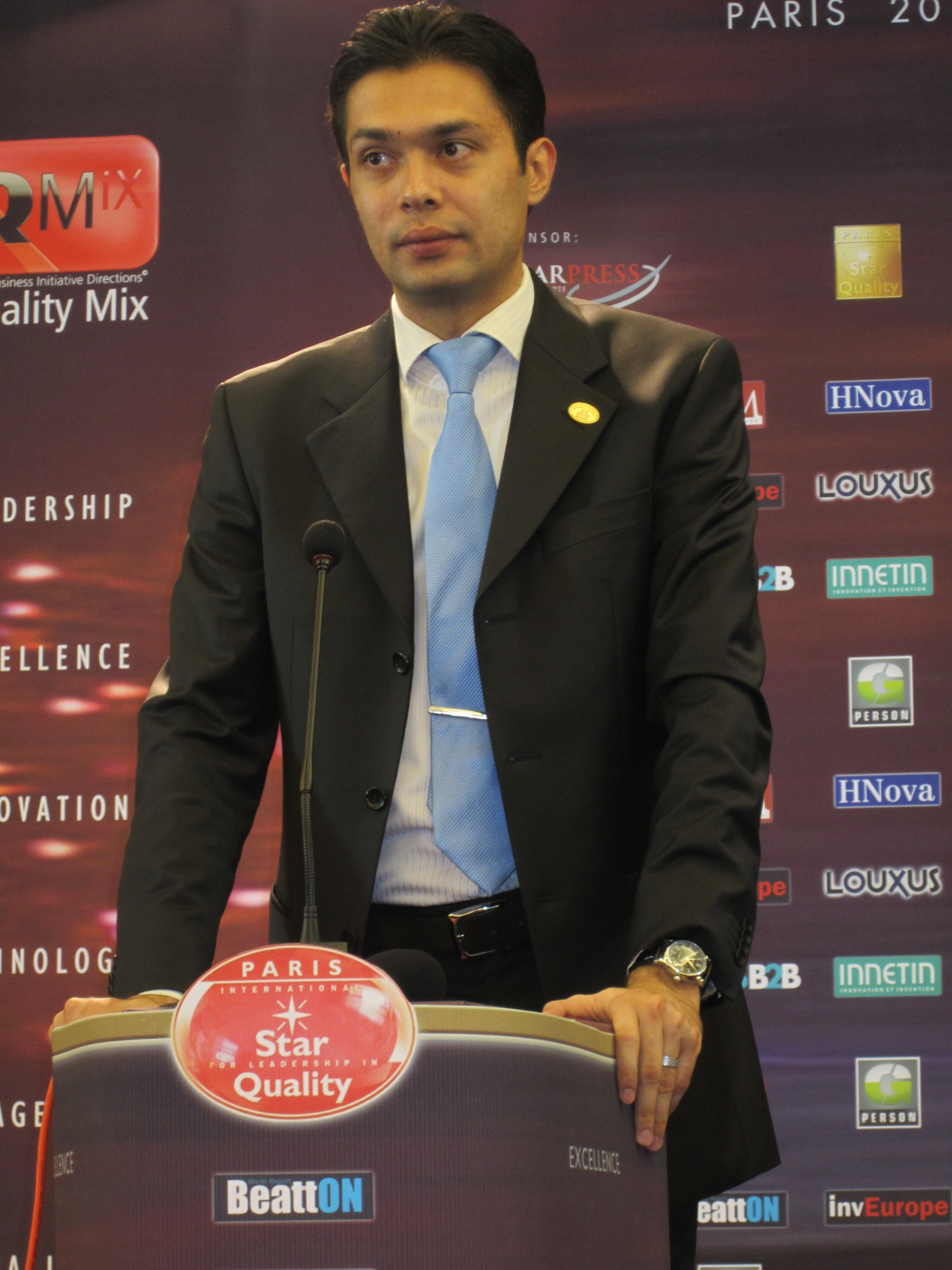
- Otabek Mahkamov in 2012
- Born: September 5, 1984 (age 41); Fergana or Tashkent, Uzbek SSR, USSR
- Occupations: actor, lawyer, and Internet personality

Otabek Mahkamov (Uzbek: Otabek Mahkamov, Отабек Маҳкамов) (born September 5, 1984) is an Uzbek film actor, lawyer, blogger, and Internet personality. Mahkamov is mostly known for his supporting roles in several Uzbek films. The actor has been in a number of notable films where he played mostly negative characters. He has also appeared in music videos of several Uzbek singers, most notably in Ozodbek Nazarbekov's "Meni kuchliroq sev".

Mahkamov's first studio movie appearance was in the 2010 film Boʻrilar 3: Oxirgi qarz (Wolves 3: The Final Debt). In the movie, he played the role of a criminal investigator. He achieved further notability in Uzbekistan after his role as an investigator in the 2011 film Majruh (Insane). Other notable films in which Mahkamov has appeared include Men yulduzman (I'm a Star) (2012), Jodugar (The Witch) (2012), Yondiradi, kuydiradi (My Love, My Pain) (2012), and Fotima (Fotima) (2013). In late 2016, Mahkamov moved to New York City and started uploading video blogs to YouTube.

== Life ==
Otabek Mahkamov was born on September 5, 1984, in either Fergana or Tashkent. In some of his interviews with Uzbek publications, Mahkamov has claimed to have been born in Tashkent. In others, he has claimed to have been born in Ferghana. His father, Abduvahob Sattorovich, died when he was young. His mother, Raʼno Erkinovna, died in 2009.

== Career ==
According to Uzbek tabloids, Mahkamov has a degree in law and worked as a lawyer. The tabloids also claim that he currently teaches at the National Association of Accountants and Auditors of Uzbekistan.

Mahkamov's first studio movie appearance was in the 2010 film Boʻrilar 3: Oxirgi qarz. He achieved further notability in Uzbekistan after his role as an investigator in the 2011 film Majruh. Other notable films in which Mahkamov has appeared include Men yulduzman (I'm a Star) (2012), Jodugar (The Witch) (2012), Yondiradi-kuydiradi (My Love, My Pain) (2012), and Fotima (Fotima) (2013).

Apart from his roles in feature films, Mahkamov has also appeared in music videos of several Uzbek singers, most notably in Ozodbek Nazarbekov's "Meni kuchliroq sev".

Mahkamov has also published his interviews with international celebrities in Uzbek tabloids and magazines. So far he has published his interviews with Cary-Hiroyuki Tagawa, Frédéric Diefenthal, Armand Assante, Ennio Morricone, and Mithun Chakraborty.

== Controversies ==
In 2015, it was reported that Mahkamov had made contradictory and false claims about his birthplace and academic qualifications. The first article that gave a detailed account of the contradictions in Mahkamov's claims was published by the Osh-based literature website Ijodkor. On March 8, 2015, the Uzbek entertainment website Sayyod published a short article which stated that Mahkamov had provided Uzbek journalists with false information about his background. The author fell short of directly accusing Mahkamov, but promised to publish a more detailed account of the matter. In an interview with the Uzbek tabloid Bekajon, Mahkamov denied the accusations.

== Filmography ==
Film
| Year | Film | Role |
|---|---|---|
| 2010 | Boʻrilar 3: Oxirgi qarz (Wolves 3: The Final Debt) | Member of the criminal investigation team |
| 2010 | Baxt izlab (Seeking Happiness) | Prosecutor |
| 2010 | Onaizor (Mother) | Director of the toy story |
| 2010 | Oʻgʻrigina kelin (The Light-Fingered Bride) | Customer |
| 2011 | Erka kuyov (The Spoiled Bridegroom) | Prosecutor |
| 2011 | Kelganda kelin 2 yoxud Anjancha muhabbat (The Alien Bride 2 or Love, Andijan Style) | Interpreter |
| 2011 | Majruh (Insane) | Investigator |
| 2011 | Nafs (Nafs) | Boutique owner |
| 2011 | Yuzma-yuz (Face to Face) | Head of the tender commission |
| 2012 | Akajonim xizmatingizdamiz (We're at Your Service, Sir) | Attorney |
| 2012 | Bardosh (Patience) | Head of the engineering company |
| 2012 | Jodugar (The Witch) | Attorney |
| 2012 | Koreyalik kelin (The Korean Bride) | Judge |
| 2012 | Mehribonim (Kind Person) | Investigator |
| 2012 | Men yulduzman (I'm a Star) | Director |
| 2012 | Oqpadar (The Disobedient Son) | Banker |
| 2012 | Soddagina qiz (The Simple Girl) | Judge |
| 2012 | Xazina (Treasure) | Member of the criminal investigation team |
| 2012 | Yondiradi, kuydiradi (My Love, My Pain) | Bridegroom |
| 2012 | Yoningdaman (I'm By Your Side) | Businessman |
| 2012 | Oʻjar kelin (The Stubborn Bride) | Doctor |
| 2013 | Bir kunlik xoʻjayin (One-Day Boss) | Doctor |
| 2013 | Farzandim 2 (My Child 2) | Director's assistant |
| 2013 | Fotima (Fotima) | Restaurant owner |
| 2013 | Gunoh (Sin) | Director's assistant |
| 2013 | Jannatdagi boʻri bolasi (A Wolfcub in Heaven) | Archivist |
| 2013 | Koʻcha (Street) | Doctor |
| 2013 | Oktyabr yomgʻiri (October Rain) | Physics teacher |
| 2013 | Parchalangan xayol (Shattered Thought) | Psychologist |
| 2013 | Qora qanotli farishta (Black-Winged Angel) | Bankchi |
| 2013 | Panjara (Grid) | Attorney |
| 2013 | Rashk (Jealousy) | Notary public's assistant |
| 2013 | Turist (The Tourist) | Passer-By |
| 2013 | Xazon (Fallen Leaves) | Uncle of the main character |
| 2013 | Oʻlim farishtasi (Angel of Death) | |
| 2014 | Koʻrgim keladi (I Want to See) | Investigator |
| 2014 | Qora mushuk (Black Cat) | |
| 2015 | Baxt ortidagi dard (Sorrow Behind Happiness) | Investigator |
| 2015 | Onasining bolasi (Like Mother, Like Daughter) | Matchmaker |
| 2015 | Qizalogʻim (My Daughter) | Lawyer |
| 2015 | Sevgi, balki bu jannat 2 (Love, Maybe It's Paradise 2) | |
| 2015 | Yetti olam (The Seven Worlds) | |
| 2015 | Yuragim seniki (My Heart Belongs to You) | |
| 2015 | Rashk 2 (Jealousy 2) | |
| 2016 | Balli, Kamoliddin! (Well Done, Kamoliddin!) | |
| 2021 | I'm Not a Terrorist | Malik |

Music videos
| Year | Song title | Artist |
|---|---|---|
| 2012 | "Meni kuchliroq sev" | Ozodbek Nazarbekov |
| 2012 | "Jonim mening" | Otabek Mutalxoʻjayev |
| 2012 | "Kel yorim" | Rashid Xoliqov |
| 2012 | "Seni sevaman" | Ulugʻbek Qodirov |
| 2013 | "Bevafo yor" | Botir Yaminov |
| 2013 | "Rolling in the Deep" | Shirin |
| 2014 | "Yogʻadi yomgʻir" | Benom |
| 2014 | "Yorim" | Munisa Rizayeva |
| 2014 | "Devonalarmiz" | Yulduz Usmonova |
| 2015 | "Qaley-qaley?" | Otabek Mutalxoʻjayev |
