= Xidirsha =

- Location within Uzbekistan
- Coordinates: 40°41′40″N 72°29′10″E
- Country: Uzbekistan
- Region: Andijan Region
- District: Xoʻjaobod District
- Elevation: 650 m (2,130 ft)

Population (2016)
  - Total: 5,300
- Time zone: UTC+5

Xidirsha (Uzbek: Xidirsha / Хидирша, Russian: Хидирша, romanized: Khidirsha) is an urban-type settlement in Andijan Region of Uzbekistan. It is part of the Xoʻjaobod District. Its population is 5,300 (2016).
