= Nazarmaxram =

- Location within Uzbekistan
- Coordinates: 40°40′27″N 72°4′1″E
- Country: Uzbekistan
- Region: Andijan Region
- District: Shahrixon District
- Elevation: 452 m (1,483 ft)
- Time zone: UTC+5

Nazarmaxram (Uzbek: Nazarmaxram, Назармахрам) is a kishlak (village) in Shahrixon District, Andijan Region, Uzbekistan. It was the district center of Khaldyvanbek District, which was abolished in 1962.
