= Suzak (disambiguation) =

Suzak or Sozak may refer to:

== Places ==
- Suzak District, in Jalal-Abad Province, Kyrgyzstan
  - Suzak, a village in that district
- Sozak District, in South Kazakhstan Province, Kazakhstan
  - Sozak, a village in that district
- Suzak, Andijan Region, Uzbekistan, a village

== Companies ==
- Suzak Inc., a video game developer

== See also ==
- Susac (disambiguation)
