= Flower Festival in Uzbekistan =

Cultural event in Uzbekistan

The Flower Festival in Uzbekistan (Uzbek: Gul bayrami) is an annual spring festival of flowers in Uzbekistan, held in Namangan, Tashkent, Bukhara, Samarkand.

== History ==
Similar festivals have been held for a long time in the mountains, hills and gardens of Uzbekistan. The flower festival is one of the most common traditions in the world. In many countries, there are special festivals dedicated to flowers, such as the sunflower festival in Greece, the chrysanthemum festival in Japan, the dahlia festival in France and the rose festival in India.

In Uzbekistan, the traditional place for the flower festival is the city of Namangan. The first flower festival was held in Namangan from August 24 to 27, 1961. Since then, the festival has been held annually. In 2019, on the recommendation of the head of the Republic of Uzbekistan Shavkat Mirziyoyev, the festival received the status of an international festival. It is attended not only by representatives of Uzbekistan, but also by other countries of the world. The festival also attracts great interest from foreign media and tourists.

Where the park in Namangan is now located, there used to be a street called Gulzor (Flower Garden). Local residents knew how to make juice, sugar and flower honey from flowers. They also knew how to make medicinal infusions from the leaves and roots of flowers. When the fame of this famous street reached the Khan of Kokand Khudoyar (ruled from 1845 to 1876), he visited Namangan and chose the street Gulzor for construction. He resettled the local population to other settlements, built a madrasah and other buildings. However, in October 1875, during the conquests of tsarist Russia, the army invaded Namangan and chose the madrasah as a fortress. The territory of the madrasah was converted into a garden of the governor of the region, and in 1920 the newly created local government took over the territory and expanded the garden.

Year after year, the festival gained its shape and traditions. Over the next three years, the gardens, floriculture and the festival itself reached an unprecedented scale. Local residents created a long caravan of carts and cars decorated with flowers.

== Organization of the festival ==
The organizers of the festival are the Ministry of Tourism and Cultural Heritage of the Republic of Uzbekistan, as well as the khokimiyat of Namangan region. As part of the festival, festive competitions of florists are held. Enterprises and organizations participating in the competition compete in the uniqueness of design and technique of floral decoration.

The venue of the festival is the park of culture and recreation named after Zakhiriddin Muhammad Babur, where flowers are planted. In the park and its surroundings, on an area of 8 hectares, the art of floriculture is shown by 250 masters-florists from different regions of the Republic of Uzbekistan, as well as representatives of landscape designers from foreign countries.

At the end of the festival, participants and contestants are awarded prizes in various nominations. The number of participants in the festival increases every year. The khokimiyat of the city of Namangan holds festive events in nearby parks, alleys and squares.

In 2023, more than 200 companies and enterprises engaged in breeding flowers in different regions and cities of Uzbekistan, as well as a delegation from the province of Yunnan, China, participated in the festival, presenting, in addition to flowers, more than 70 large compositions.

According to official data from the government of Namangan region, the festival was visited by more than 500 thousand guests, including from the districts of the region - more than 390 thousand, from other regions of Uzbekistan - more than 121 thousand, from other states - more than 6600. Most of the guests came from Kyrgyzstan - about 6000 people. The festival attracted the attention of tourists from Russia, China, Turkey, Bangladesh and India, South Korea, the Netherlands, Germany, Italy, Poland, Tajikistan, Kazakhstan and Turkmenistan. The festival was opened by the khokim of Namangan region Shavkatjon Abdurazakov, the Minister of Culture Ozodbek Nazarbekov and other famous figures of art.

As part of the festival, in addition to the exhibition of floral compositions, various cultural events are held, which demonstrate the diverse traditions of the region. Guests can listen to traditional musical compositions and watch folk dances. Try dishes of local cuisine, get acquainted with traditional crafts, such as embroidery, pottery and carpet weaving.

In addition to Namangan, the flower festival is held annually in other cities of the Republic: Tashkent, Bukhara, Samarkand.
