= Suzak, Andijan Region =

Suzak Suzoq
- Village
- Location in Uzbekistan
- Coordinates: 40°44′14″N 72°0′34″E
- Country: Uzbekistan
- Region: Andijan Region
- District: Shakhrihon District
- Time zone: UTC+5 (UZT)

Suzak (Uzbek: Suzoq; Russian: Сузак) is a village in Shahrixon District, Andijan Region, Uzbekistan.
