= Qorasuv =

Qorasuv Uzbek: Qorasuv
- City
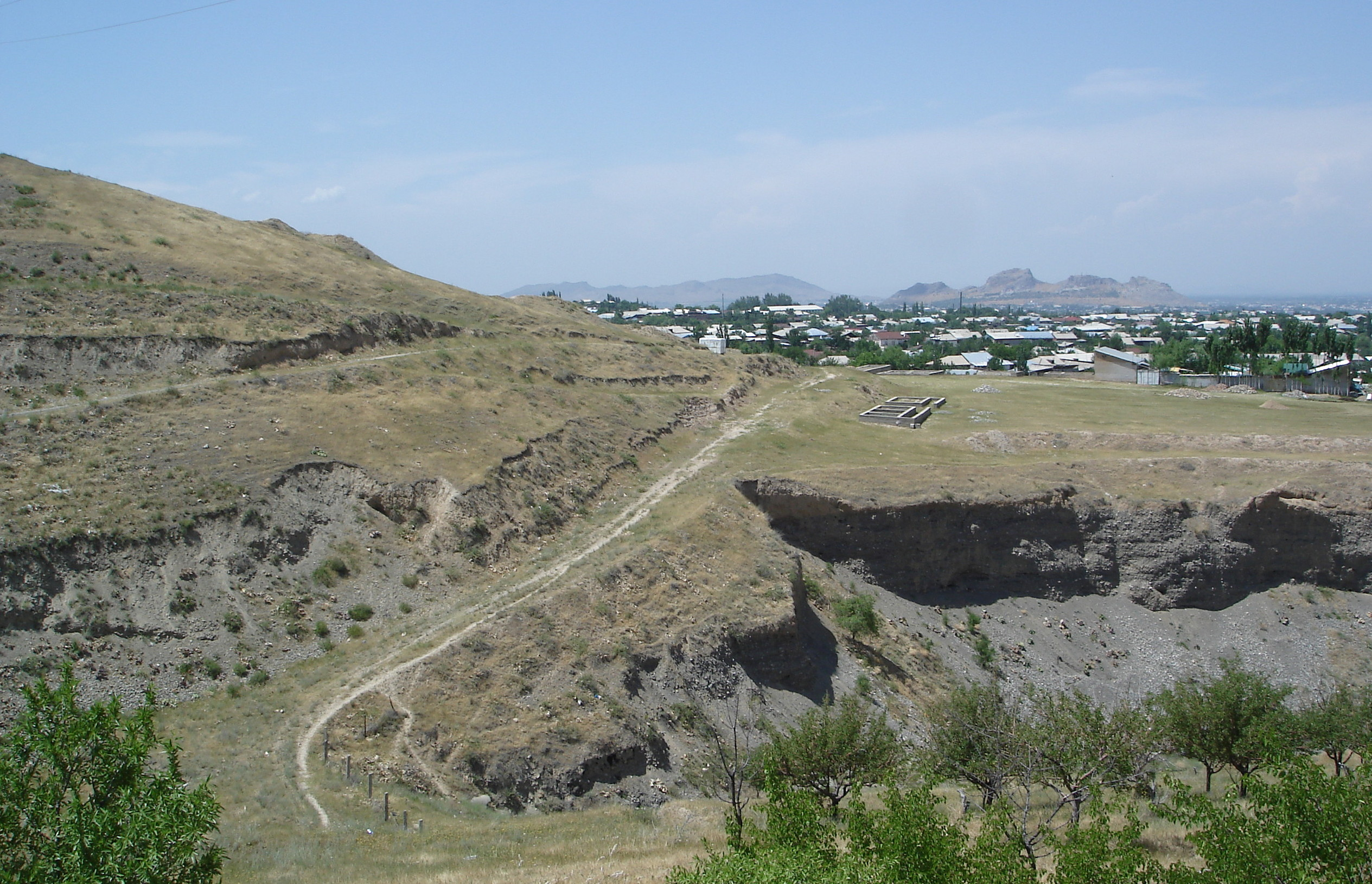

- Location in Uzbekistan
- Coordinates: 40°43′20″N 72°53′14″E
- Country: Uzbekistan
- Region: Andijan Region
- District: Qoʻrgʻontepa District

Population (2025)
  - Total: 51,300
- Time zone: UTC+5 (UZT)

Qorasuv (also Korasuv, Karasu; Uzbek: Qorasuv, lit. 'Black Water') is a city in Qoʻrgʻontepa District of Andijan Region in eastern Uzbekistan, about 50 km from the district capital of Andijan. The town's name means "black water" in Uzbek (qora - black, suv - water). It lies in the politically volatile and religiously conservative Fergana Valley, along the border with Kyrgyzstan. Its population is 33,000 (2016).

It is essentially one town with Kara-Suu in Kyrgyzstan, but is separated from the latter by a Soviet-era border which today is tightly controlled by Uzbekistan. Qorasuv was the second town in Uzbekistan to be sealed off during the Andijan massacre in spring 2005, when some 6,000 people fled across the border. A border town, it is an important market town, especially for cottonseed oil trading.
