= Ozodbek Nazarbekov =

Uzbekistani singer

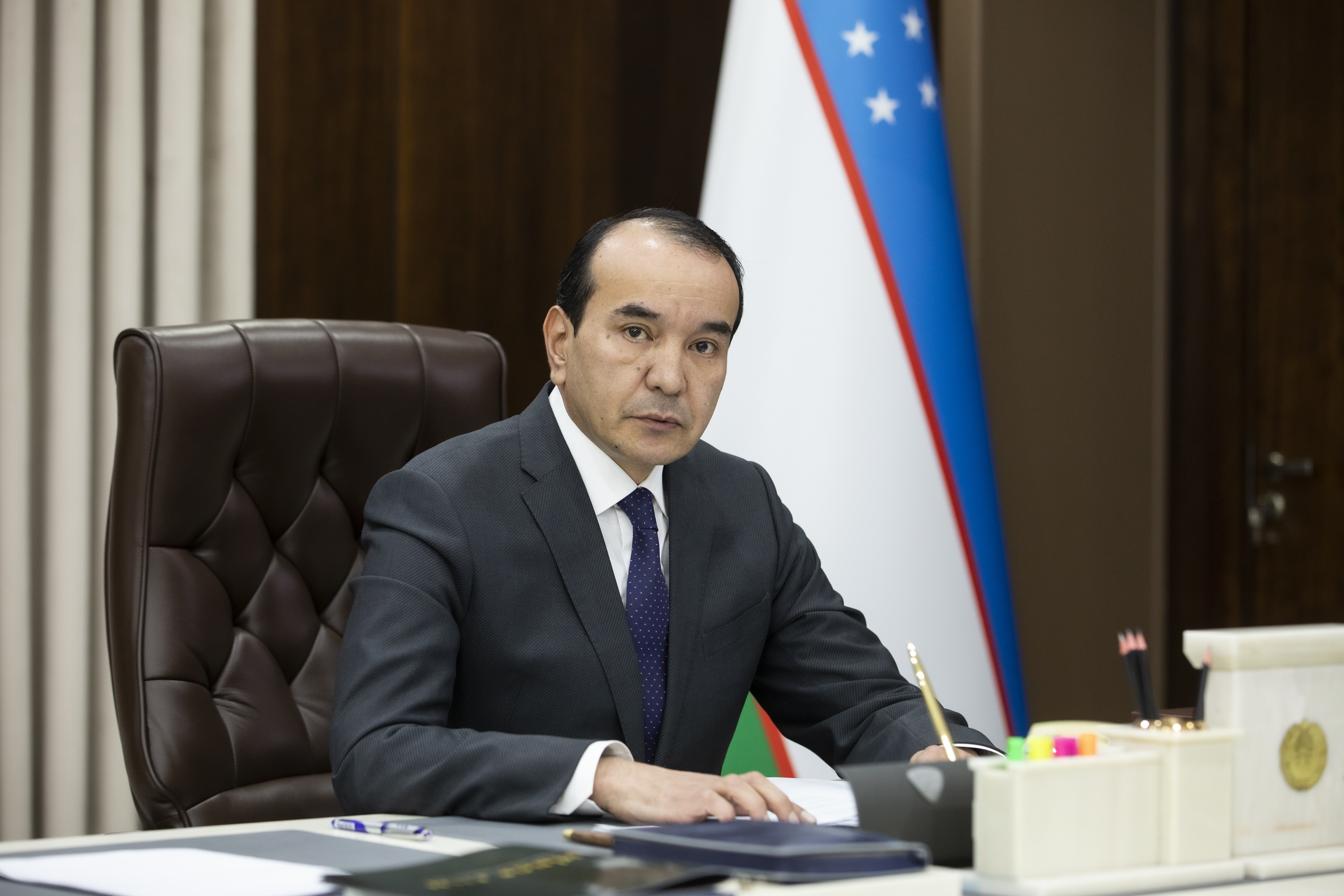

Minister of Culture
- Incumbent
- Assumed office January 22, 2020
- President: Shavkat Mirziyoyev

Personal details
- Born: Ozodbek Ahmadovich Nazarbekov; 7 May 1974 (age 52) Andijan Region, Shahrixon District, Uzbek SSR, USSR
- Children: 5
- Occupation: Singer

Ozodbek Ahmadovich Nazarbekov (born 7 May 1974, Andijon region, Shahrixon District) is a well-known Uzbek singer, honored artist of Uzbekistan (2010), and honored artist of Karakalpakstan. He is also the Minister of Culture of Uzbekistan and has been serving as the rector of the Uzbek National Institute of Music Art since 2020.

== Early life and education ==
He was born on 7 May 1974, in the Shahrixon District of the Andijon region. His father was Ahmad Nazarbekov. He graduated from the Uzbekistan State Institute of Arts in 2007.

== Artistic activity ==
Nazarbekov's creative journey began in 1994. From 2002 to 2008, he worked as a solo singer in the "O'zbeknavo" pop ensemble. He was one of the famous students of the late singer Muhriddin Xoliqov. Starting in 2006, he actively participated in state events at the national level, including the celebrations of the Uzbekistan Republic Constitution, Navruz, and Independence Day. He presented his solo concert programs in all regions of Uzbekistan and went on concert tours to foreign countries. From 2008 to 2017, he was a soloist in the Armed Forces Song and Dance Ensemble of the Republic of Uzbekistan. In July and August 2017, he worked as the director of the "Yoshlar" TV channel. On 10 August 2017, he was appointed as the Deputy Minister of Culture of Uzbekistan. He also served as the Chief Producer of the "Yoshlar" TV channel.

=== Solo concert programs ===
During his career, he performed many solo concert programs:

- On 22 June 2003. "Oydin kechalar"
- 15–16 April 2005. "Yuragimdan kuylaganim sen"
- From 12 to 17 April 2006. "Sening darding"
- From 7 to 14 April 2007. "Diydor shirin"
- In April 2008. "Jondan aziz"
- From 1 to 4 August 2008. "Yaprogʻimiz azim chinorning"
- From 4 to 24 April 2009. "Mushtarak manzil".
- From 5 to 23 April 2010. "Qadamlar hikmati"
- From 2 April to 2 May 2011. "Kundan kun yahshi"
- From 6 to 20 April 2012. "Xush keldinggiz"
- From 5 to 21 April 2013. "Taqdirimsan, baxtimsan" Y
- In 2014 "Mening baxtim"
- In 2015 — "Ardogʻimdasiz"
- In 2016 — "Mehring sabab"

== Political career ==
From 2018 to 2020, he held the position of the First Deputy Minister of Culture of the Republic of Uzbekistan. Starting from 22 January 2020, he served as the Minister of Culture of the Republic of Uzbekistan.

On 21 July 2023, by the decision of the Higher Attestation Commission, the title of "Professor" in the field of "Music Art" was awarded to Nazarbekov based on the recommendation of the council of the Uzbek National Institute of Music Art in the name of Yunus Rajabiy.

== Awards ==
- In 2007 "Honored artist of Uzbekistan"
- In 2010 "People's Artist of Uzbekistan"
- In 2010 "Male Vocalist of the Year Award"
- In 2012 "Qoraqalpogʻiston xalq artisti unvoni" ("The title of People's Artist of Karakalpakstan")
- In 2014 "El-yurt hurmati" ordeni (Order of "Respect of the Country")
- In 2023– "Professor" in the field of "Music Art"
- In 2024 - “Peoples’ artist of Republic of Kyrgyzstan”

== Discography ==
During his career, he performed many songs:

=== Chang ko`chalar (2003) ===
- "Xotira"
- "Sevgilim"
- "Dilbarim"
- "Qulogʻi chandiq qiz"
- "Sen Gulsan"
- "Bevafo"
- "Kechalar"
- Oʻzbekiston
- Chang koʻchalar
- Shirin-shirin
- Osmoningga
- Olib ket yor
- Yallo-yallo''
- Chinor tagida
- Nigor
- Toshkentim goʻzallari
- Barno
- Hanjar

=== Devona ko‘ngil (2004) ===
- Majnun
- Voy bo‘ldi
- Go‘zal
- Topmadim
- Prinsessa tay
- Duet
- Xato bo‘ldi
- Jonim
- Kelarsan
- Ko‘rgim kelar
- Kuygan koʻngil
- Bir kelib ket
- Druzya
- Ayriliq

=== Yuragimdan kuylaganim sen (2005) ===
- Yuragimdan kuylaganim sen
- Jonim mani
- Devona oshiq
- Laylim
- Ikkimiz
- Soʻyla
- Sevib qoldim
- U go‘zal boshqa
- Alam endi
- Chaqmoq
- Onam hayot bo‘lganda
- Dilbar
- Sen o‘zing
- Kuygan ko‘ngil

=== Sening darding (2006) ===
- Sening darding
- Kuyib qolganman
- Koʻrinmasang
- Seni sevdim
- Onam
- Qaro qoshligim
- Biyo-biyo
- Yaxshiydi
- Yomgʻir
- Keladur
- Kutaman
- Tabassuming
- Ketolmayman
- Masturayam
- Ne istarsan
- Olis-olis

=== Diydor shirin (2007) ===
- Anjancha
- Begona
- Bevafo
- Diydor
- Erkalab
- Eshiging
- Jon oʻrta
- Ketman
- Koʻrsam
- Nega uchrashdik
- Onam yoʻq
- Qizgʻaldoq
- Qasam
- Shukrona
- Samarqandcha
- Sarob
- Turnalar
- Yorim qani
- Yoronlar
- Yigʻlagim keldi
- Yuragim

=== Jondan aziz (2008) ===
- Bogʻ aro
- Devona
- Dilorom
- Fargʻonada bir qiz
- Jondan aziz
- Kelasizmi
- Muhabbat
- Nayda bor
- Qaldirgʻoch
- Rost
- Rayxon
- Tabarruk
- Toʻydirdi
- Uchradim
- Xonzoda qiz

=== Mushtarak manzil (2009) ===
- Mani sevib qolsayding
- Jiyda gulim
- Zor aylama
- May
- Oʻgʻlim
- Yana
- Qaro koʻzim
- Yigʻlarman
- Ayt
- Kimga yomon
- Ayirma
- Ne savdolar
- Qaydasan yorim
- Yaxshigina
- Eslatib

=== Qadamlar hikmati (2010) ===
- Ado-ado
- Aldama
- Barkamol avlod
- Beparvo
- Bilaman yorim
- Bu kecha
- Gul
- Ibosi manda
- Jon sevgilim
- Kelaman
- Man
- Oʻrgilay
- Ona
- Ota
- Qachon
- Sendan boʻlak
- Shoʻx yillar
- Sogʻinadi
- Uqubat
- Yonimda

=== Kundan kun yaxshi (2011) ===
- Ajoyibsanda
- Xijron
- Begoyim
- Bu Vatan barchamizniki
- Sog‘inib
- Sevilmaganlar
- Seni o‘ylab
- Onam allasi
- Kimlar
- Janannim
- Omon-omon
- Sevdim
- Yig‘larmisan

=== Taqdirimsan, Baxtimsan (2013) ===
- Kechir
- Gulyor
- Aka-singil
- Sevib qolmasammidi
- Muhabbat
- Inson
- Lola
- Koʻzmunchoq
- Muhtojman
- Bedorman
- Qolmadi
- Taqdirimsan Baxtimsan
- Erkak Kishini
- Layli

=== Mening baxtim (2014) ===
- Aylanay
- Ayollar yomon
- Bogʻdodda nima gaplar
- Bolam dema
- Boshta havodur
- Koʻzlarim yoʻlda
- Lalixon
- Oʻzgarib ketdi
- Olloh goʻzal (Allah is Beautiful)
- Ozormi
- Pariroʻy
- Qancha
- Qilma gumon
- Qiynama
- Qoshlari qaro
- Xumori bor bu yurtning
