= Kuyganyor =

- Urban-type settlement
- Location in Uzbekistan
- Coordinates: 40°51′40″N 72°18′40″E
- Country: Uzbekistan
- Region: Andijan Region
- District: Andijan District
- Urban-type settlement: 1978
- Elevation: 508 m (1,667 ft)

Population (2016)
  - Total: 12,200
- Time zone: UTC+5 (UZT)

Kuyganyor (also spelled as Kuyganyar, Uzbek: Kuyganyor, Куйганёр, Russian: Куйганъяр) is an urban-type settlement in Andijan Region, Uzbekistan. It is the administrative center of Andijan District. The town population was 8,426 people in 1989, and 12,200 in 2016.
