= Oqoltin =

- Urban-type settlement
- Location in Uzbekistan
- Coordinates: 40°45′00″N 71°42′20″E
- Country: Uzbekistan
- Region: Andijan Region
- District: Ulugʻnor District

Population (2016)
  - Total: 5,700
- Time zone: UTC+5 (UZT)

Oqoltin (Uzbek: Oqoltin, Оқолтин, Russian: Акалтын, romanized: Akaltyn) is an urban-type settlement in Andijan Region, Uzbekistan. It is the administrative center of Ulugʻnor District. The town population was 6,522 people in 1989, and 5,700 in 2016.
