= Poytugʻ =

- City
- Location in Uzbekistan
- Coordinates: 40°54′00″N 72°15′00″E
- Country: Uzbekistan
- Region: Andijan Region
- District: Izboskan District
- Town status: 1980

Population (2016)
  - Total: 26,000
- Time zone: UTC+5 (UZT)

Poytugʻ or Paytug (Uzbek: Poytugʻ, Пойтуғ or Paytug / Пайтуг, Russian: Пайтуг or Paytiq) is a city in Andijan Region, Uzbekistan. It is the administrative center of Izboskan District. Its population was 19,389 in 1989, 29,200 in 2003, and 26,000 in 2016.
