= I'm Not a Terrorist =

2021 war film

- Directed by: Muhammad Ali Iskandarov
- Written by: Muhammad Ali Iskandarov
- Produced by: Firdavs Abdukhalikov; Muhammad Ali Iskandarov
- Starring: Nurmuhammadxon Husniddinov; Sadriddin Amriddinov; David Bayramyan; Sulim Selihanov; Bekzod Tadjiev; Ahmed Serken Er; Otabek Mahkamov
- Cinematography: Khusan Atabaev
- Edited by: Aleksandr Kim
- Music by: Jasur Badalbaev
- Production companies: Uzbekistan Cinematography Agency; Iskandariy visual
- Release date: May 22, 2021
- Running time: 70 min.
- Country: Uzbekistan
- Language: Russian / Uzbek
- Budget: $150,000

I'm Not a Terrorist (rus. Я не террорист uzb. Men terrorchi emasman) is a 2021 Uzbek film about the war in Syria. Screenwriter and directed by Muhammad Ali Iskandarov. The movie is based on real events. It recounts the fate of those who have joined terrorist groups ISIS. The film is a joint production of Uzbekistan Cinematography Agency and the film company Iskandariy visual with the support of State Security Service of the Republic of Uzbekistan. Producer Firdavs Abdukhalikov.

== Plot ==
The main characters of the film are professional athletes Alikhan and Sadri participating in competitions ММА, and collectors work in their free time. When unpleasant details about their illegal activities emerge, they leave the country and flee to Turkey, prosecuted by law enforcement sp. At the same time, they illegally cross the Syrian-Turkish border and they end up in Syria, where they are met by compatriots and citizens from countries (CIS) that are part of the terrorist group ISIS.

At first sympathetic to extremist ideology, the protagonists soon become disillusioned with it and attempt to return to normal life - but there is no turning back. In the next bloody battle, they die, never being able to get out of the terrorist cell.

== Cast ==
- Nurmuhammadxon Husniddinov as Alixan
- Sadriddin Amriddinov as Sadri
- Sulim Selihanov as Ramzan
- David Abramyan as Isa
- Bekzod Tadjiev as Abbos
- Ahmed Serken Er as Osmanbey
- Otabek Mahkamov as Malik
- San Jey as Makhmud
- Shakhrukh Rakhimov as Akhmad

== Production ==
Filming began in May 2018 and took place in countries: Uzbekistan, Turkey.

"In fact, the filming was supposed to take place in other countries. However, due to the pandemic, we built a special pavilion in our country for filming and tried to reflect the life of the militants in it", said Iskandarov.

Due to the COVID-19 pandemic the premiere date was postponed three times. The first film released in theaters after the restrictions due to the pandemic in Uzbekistan.

"The main purpose of our project is to convey to the audience, especially to young people, the monstrous essence of terrorism, its criminal acts against humanity... to show the greedy and treacherous face of terrorism, the groundlessness of the ideas of terrorism and the irreversibility of punishment for such actions," stated Iskandarov.

=== Sound post-production ===
Sound director Konstantin Filanov. Sound design Dmitry Timonin. CineLab sound post-production complex. Dolby Digital 5.1

=== Music ===
The music for the film "I'm Not a Terrorist" was written Jasur Badalbayev.

== Rental ==
The film was broadcast in the largest cinemas in Uzbekistan. It has also been shown on large screens in some foreign countries.

== Quotes ==
A meeting with the director, actor and screenwriter was held in NA Uzbekkino Dzhanik Faiziev. At the beginning of the meeting, the film "I'm not a terrorist" was shown. Then Faiziev spoke about the successes and shortcomings of the film.

"Young director Muhammad Ali Iskandarov made an amazing film about the events taking place in Syria. This is an authentic drama that will bypass all film festivals." - said film director Rashid Malikov.

"In turn, I watched almost two dozen short meters of young directors of Uzbekistan as part of the week of national cinema in Tashkent. And, as a person who has long been engaged in film education, he noted common problems with most works: with all the diligence and enthusiasm of the authors, the lack of dramatic training and visibility, knowledge of the world film context is very noticeable. These are the things without which it is impossible to create modern competitive cinema. From the full-length cinema, I want to note the film 'I'm not a terrorist', which quite confidently presents modern cinema in Uzbekistan", said Felix Krivosheev, Member of the Guild of Producers of Russia, founder of the First Online Film School.
