= Susac =

Susac may refer to:

- Shishak, also spelled Shishaq or Susac
- Dr. John Susac (1940-2012), who first described the condition called Susac's syndrome
- Adam Sušac (born 1989), Croatian footballer
- Andrew Susac (born 1990), American professional baseball player
- Daniel Susac (born 2001), American professional baseball player
- Marko Sušac (born 1988), Bosnian footballer
- Sušac, an island in the Adriatic Sea near the island of Korčula, in Croatia
- Susac Crni, a native red wine grape in the Kvarner region of Croatia

== See also ==
- Suzak (disambiguation)
- Sussac (Occitan: Suçac), a commune in the Nouvelle-Aquitaine region in west-central France
