= Boz (name) =

Name

Boz is a given name, nickname, and surname. It may refer to:

== People with the given name ==
- Boz (king) (died c. 380), king of the Antes, in what is now Ukraine

== People with the nickname or stage name ==
- Charles Dickens (1812–1870) wrote some of his early works under this pen name
- William Boz Scaggs (born 1944), American singer, songwriter and guitarist
- Raymond Boz Burrell (1946–2006), English singer and bass guitarist
- Martin Boz Boorer (born 1962), English guitarist and songwriter
- Brian Bosworth (born 1965), American football player and actor nicknamed "the Boz"
- Mark Bosnich (born 1972), Australian former football goalkeeper and sports pundit, cohost of the television sports show Bill & Boz
- Andrew Bosworth, an American technology executive and current Chief Technology Officer at Meta

== People with the surname ==
- Alina Boz (born 1998), Turkish-Russian actress
- Lucian Boz (1908–2003), Romanian literary critic, essayist, novelist, poet and translator
- Mahmut Boz (born 1991), Turkish footballer
- Meryem Boz (born 1988), Turkish volleyball player
- Murat Boz (born 1980), Turkish pop singer
- Nevval Boz (died 1993), Turkish woman killed, possibly as part of a cover-up of the suspected assassination of General Eşref Bitlis
- Soner Boz (born 1968), Turkish former footballer

== Fictional characters ==
- Boz Bishop, in seasons 3–6 of the 1990s–2000s American television series Nash Bridges
- Murray "Boz" Bozinsky, in the 1980s American television series Riptide
- Johnny Boz, in the 1992 film Basic Instinct
- Officer Boz, in the 2021 film Spiral

== See also ==
- Boz (disambiguation)
