= Ulugʻnor District =

Coordinates: 40.7333°N 72.7667°E

Ulugʻnor
- District
- Ulugʻnor tumani
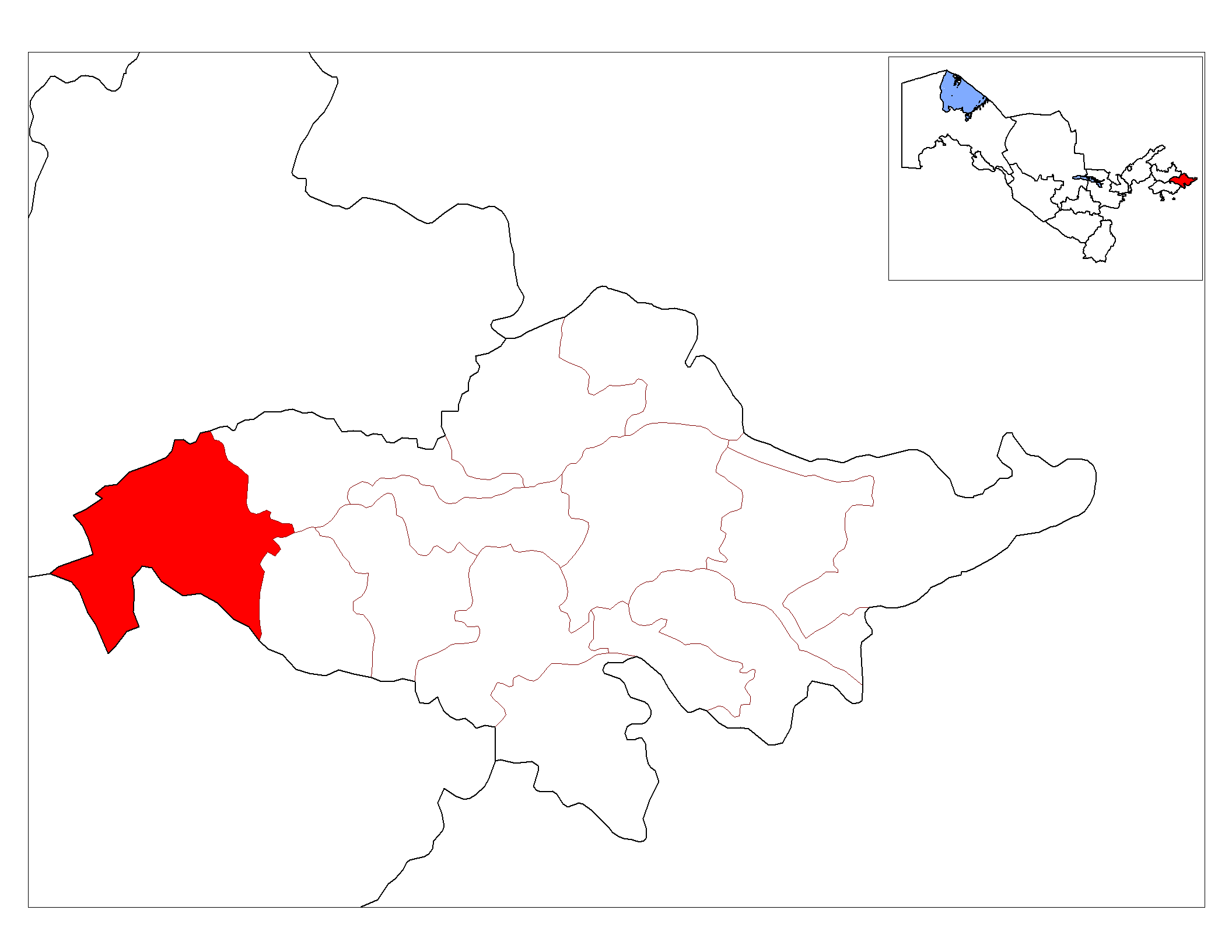
- Country: Uzbekistan
- Region: Andijan Region
- Capital: Oqoltin
- Established: 1973

Area
  - Total: 420 km^{2} (160 sq mi)

Population (2022)
  - Total: 61,800
  - Density: 150/km^{2} (380/sq mi)
- Time zone: UTC+5 (UZT)

Ulugʻnor District is a district of Andijan Region in Uzbekistan. The capital lies at the town Oqoltin. It has an area of 420 km^{2} (160 sq mi) and it had 61,800 inhabitants in 2022.

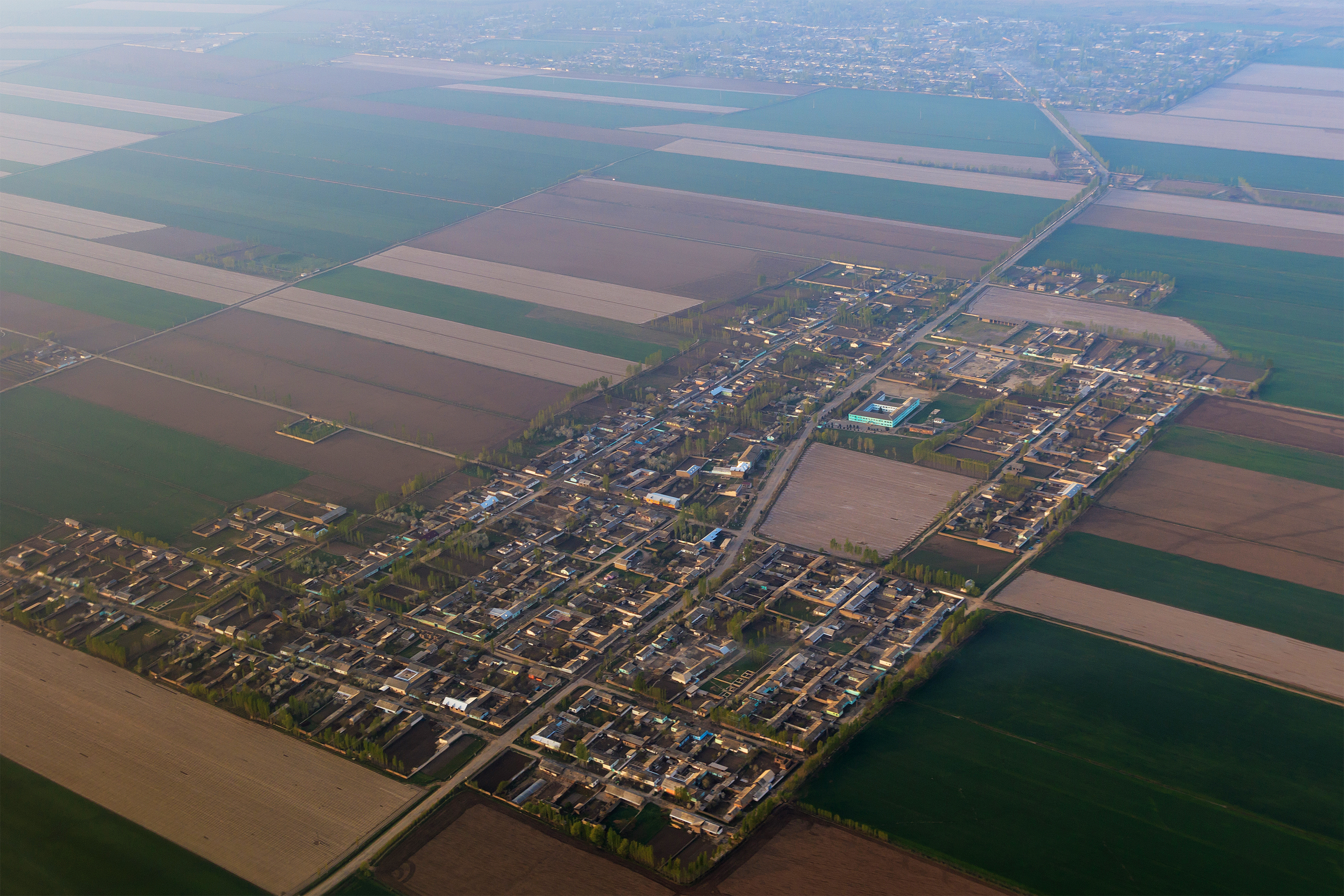
Andijan Region Ulug'nor District aerial view

The district consists of 1 urban-type settlement (Oqoltin) and 4 rural communities.
