= Asaka, Uzbekistan =

Asaka Asaka/Асака
- City
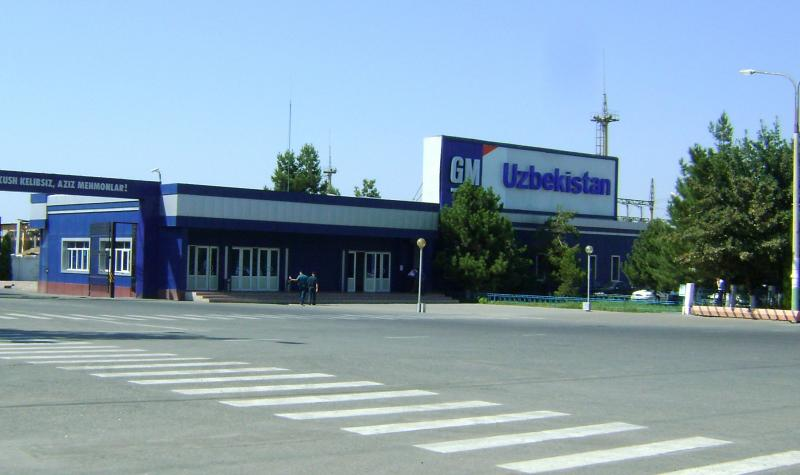

- Location in Uzbekistan
- Coordinates: 40°38′N 72°14′E
- Country: Uzbekistan
- Region: Andijan Region
- District: Asaka District
- City status: 1937
- Elevation: 495 m (1,624 ft)

Population (2016)
  - Total: 62,200
  - Density: 1,256/km^{2} (3,250/sq mi)
- Time zone: UTC+5 (UZT)
  - Summer (DST): UTC+5 (not observed)
- Postal code: 170200
- Area code: +998 74

Asaka (Uzbek: Asaka/Aсака; Russian: Aсака) is a city and the administrative center of Asaka District in eastern Uzbekistan, located in the southeastern edge of the Fergana Valley near Uzbekistan's border with Kyrgyzstan.

Asaka underwent rapid industrialization during the Soviet era. Currently, it is the second biggest industrial city in Andijan Region, the first being Andijan. Asaka is home to the first automobile assembly plant in Central Asia, namely UzAutoMotors (formerly UzDaewooAuto).

== Etymology ==
The origins of the city's name are uncertain. Some sources say that it derives from the Saka words "asvaka" or "as-saka" which mean "horse" or "horsemen", respectively. That is why a statue of a horse was erected in one of Asaka's squares in 1997 during the 60th anniversary of the city's founding. According to others, "Assake" (the original name of the city) is an ancient term derived from the Iranian ethnonym referring to Central Asian Scythians.

== History ==
It has been known since ancient times as Asaka. The early history of Asaka has not been studied extensively. Avaz Muhammad Attor, a 19th-century historian, mentioned Assake in his book Tarixi jahonnoma (World History). According to him, Khudayar Khan had built a castle in the territory of present-day Asaka. Assake started to grow fast after the nearby city of Andijan and Tashkent were connected with a railway line. At the turn of the 20th century, Assake had a population of only 2,000 people.

In 1924, Assake was renamed Zelensk, after a local official. In 1937, it was granted town status and again renamed, this time Leninsk, after Vladimir Lenin. The city underwent rapid industrialization during the Soviet era. In 1946, a large electric motor plant was built in Asaka. In the 1960s, the city specialized in processing agricultural goods.

The city's original name was restored in a slightly modified form (Asake) after Uzbekistan's independence in 1991. In 1994, the first automobile assembly plant in Central Asia was built in Asaka by UzDaewooAuto, an Uzbekistani-South Korean joint venture. Following Daewoo's collapse in 2001, and the resulting change of ownership, UzDaewooAuto was reorganized as GM Uzbekistan in March 2008 as a new replacement joint venture.

== Geography ==
Asaka is located 495 metres (1,624 ft) above sea level in the southeastern edge of the Fergana Valley near Uzbekistan's border with Kyrgyzstan. By road it is 22 kilometres (14 mi) southwest of Andijan. The Shahrixonsoy Canal flows through the city.

=== Climate ===
Asaka has a cold desert climate (Köppen climate classification BWk) with continental influences. It has cold winters and hot summers. The average July temperature is +26.1 °C (79.0 °F). The mean temperature in January is −2.9 °C (26.8 °F).

Climate data for Asaka
Month	Jan	Feb	Mar	Apr	May	Jun	Jul	Aug	Sep	Oct	Nov	Dec	Year
Mean daily maximum °C (°F)	3 (37)	7 (45)	14 (57)	20 (68)	25 (77)	31 (88)	32 (90)	31 (88)	27 (81)	20 (68)	12 (54)	5 (41)	19 (66)
Mean daily minimum °C (°F)	−5 (23)	−2 (28)	4 (39)	9 (48)	13 (55)	17 (63)	19 (66)	18 (64)	13 (55)	8 (46)	3 (37)	−3 (27)	8 (46)
Average precipitation mm (inches)	8.8 (0.35)	5.6 (0.22)	24.3 (0.96)	36.6 (1.44)	33.9 (1.33)	10 (0.4)	4.7 (0.19)	1.7 (0.07)	2.4 (0.09)	5.7 (0.22)	5.8 (0.23)	19.6 (0.77)	159.1 (6.27)

== Demographics ==
In 2016, Asaka had a population of 62,200. Representatives of many ethnic groups can be found in the city. Uzbeks are the largest ethnic group.

Historical population
Year	Pop.	±%
1972	30,300	—
2000	52,800	+74.3%
2010	66,000	+25.0%
2016	62,200	−5.8%

== Economy ==
Asaka is the second biggest industrial city in Andijan Region, the first being the City of Andijan. There are 12 large industrial plants and over 510 small and medium enterprises in the city.

=== GM Uzbekistan ===
Asaka is home to the first automobile assembly plant in Central Asia, namely GM Uzbekistan. It was founded as UzDaewooAuto in 1992 between the Uzbek state-owned company UzAvtoSanoat and the South Korean automotive company Daewoo Motors. The construction of the plant was started in 1994 and took two years. Following the change of ownership of Daewoo to GM Daewoo, UzDaewooAuto was renamed GM Uzbekistan in 2008.

== Education ==
There are three technical schools (tekhnikum), 24th and 42nd specialized schools, and many language and education centers in Asaka. The city is also home to ten secondary schools and 22 kindergartens.
