= Asaka District =

Coordinates: 40.63°N 72.23°E

Asaka
- District
- Asaka tumani
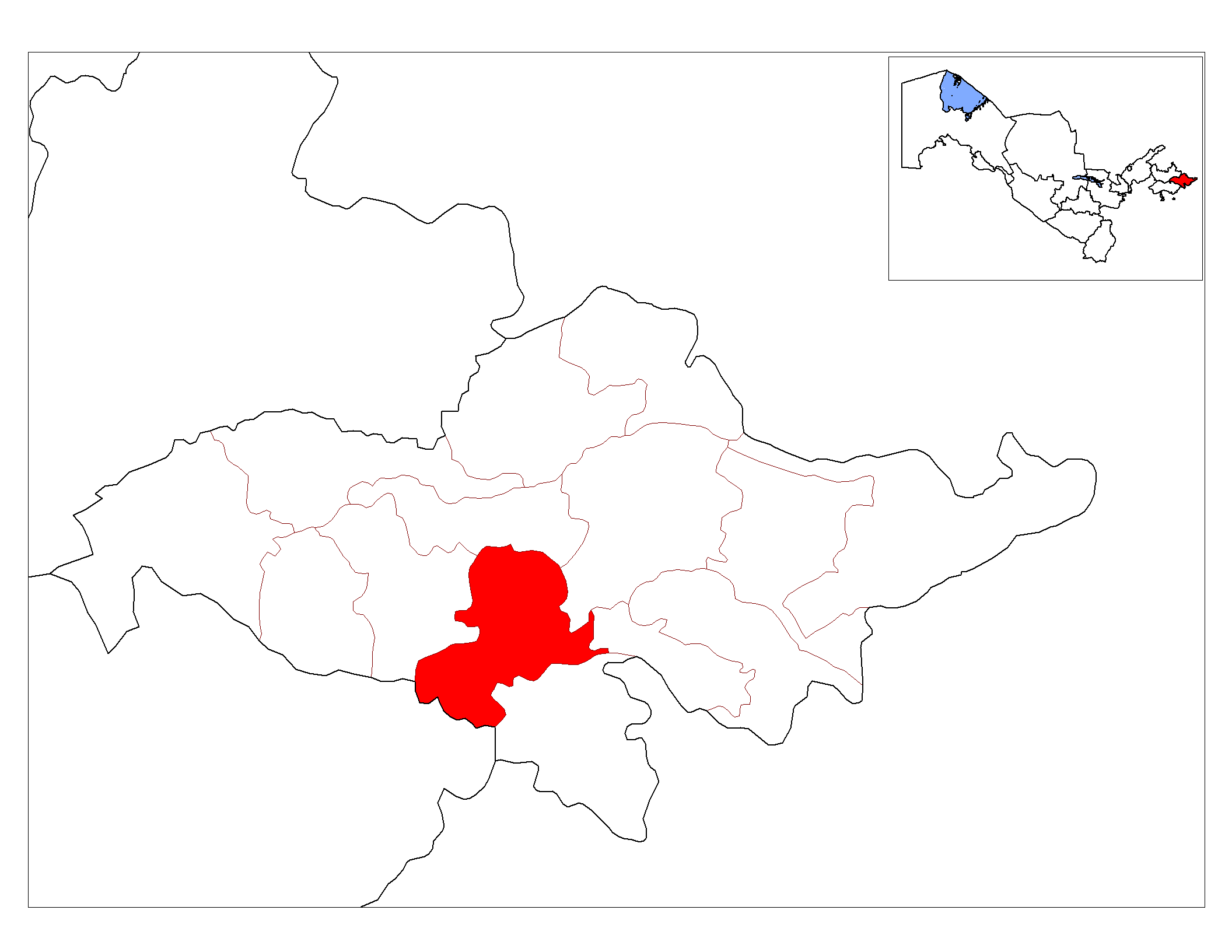
- Country: Uzbekistan
- Region: Andijan Region
- Capital: Asaka
- Established: 1926

Area
  - Total: 270 km^{2} (100 sq mi)

Population (2022)
  - Total: 340,000
  - Density: 1,300/km^{2} (3,300/sq mi)
- Time zone: UTC+5 (UZT)

Asaka is a district of Andijan Region in Uzbekistan. The capital lies at Asaka. It has an area of 270 km^{2} (100 sq mi) and it had 340,000 inhabitants in 2022.

The district consists of 1 city (Asaka), 4 urban-type settlements (Kujgan, Navkan, Oqboʻyra and T.Aliyev) and 8 rural communities.

Asaka has always been eminent for its transportation means,- for its horses in the past and cars that GM Uzbekistan (car-manufacturing plant located in the heart of the district) produces today. In fact, the town is named after a beautiful horse which, according to a folk legend, was owned by a local mustanger.
