= Andijan District =

Coordinates: 40.8667°N 72.3167°E

Andijan
- District
- Andijon tumani
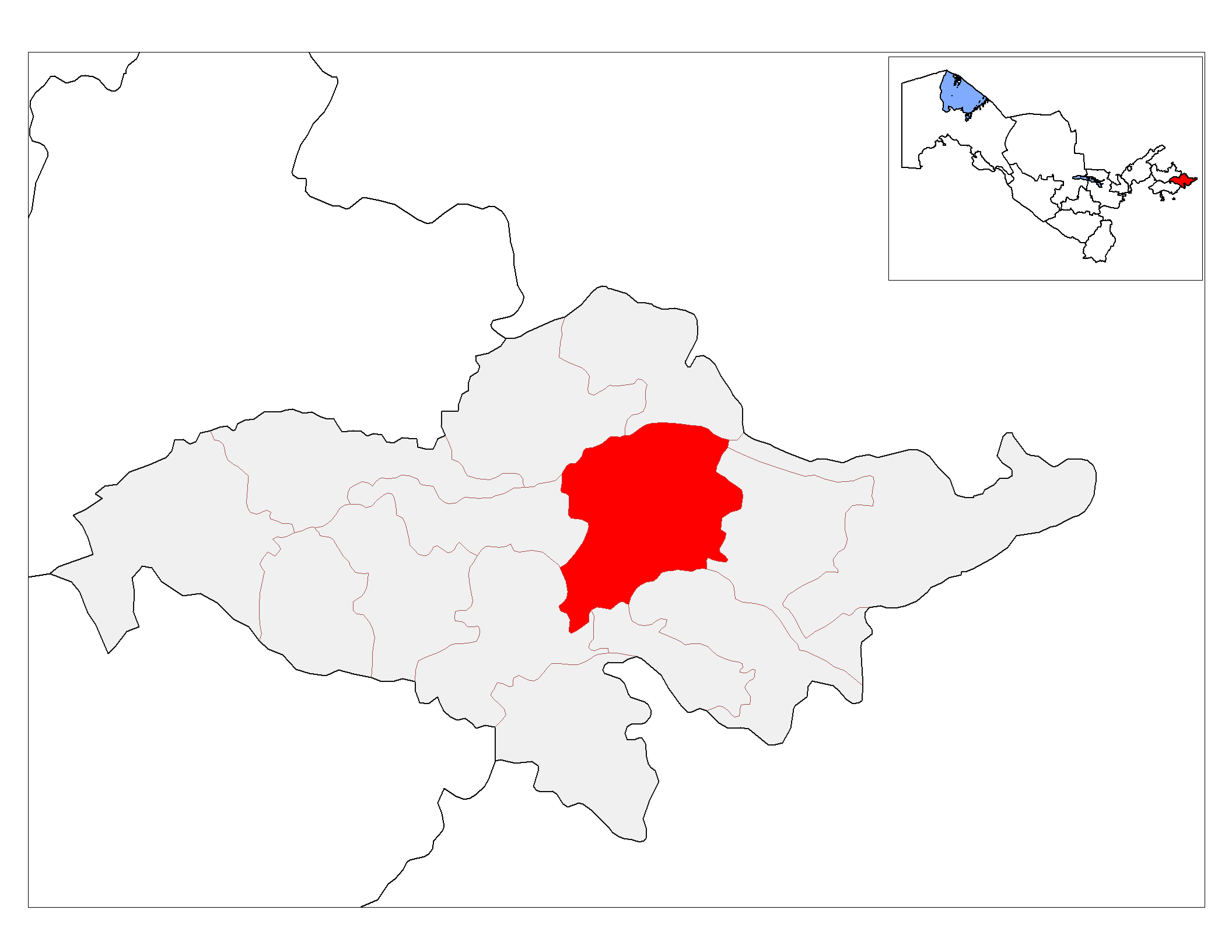
- Country: Uzbekistan
- Region: Andijan Region
- Capital: Kuyganyor
- Established: 1926

Area
  - Total: 370 km^{2} (140 sq mi)

Population (2022)
  - Total: 273,800
  - Density: 740/km^{2} (1,900/sq mi)
- Time zone: UTC+5 (UZT)

Andijan District (Uzbek: Andijon tumani) is a district of Andijan Region in Uzbekistan. The capital lies at the town Kuyganyor. It has an area of 370 km^{2} (140 sq mi) and it had 273,800 inhabitants in 2022.

The district consists of 19 urban-type settlements and 9 rural communities. The urban-type settlements are Kuyganyor, Ayrilish, Butaqora, Guliston, Gumbaz, Zavroq, Qoraqalpoq, Kunji, Qoʻshariq, Namuna, Ogʻullik, Oq-yor, Rovvot, Xartum, Chilon, Chumbogʻich, Ekin tikin, Yangiobod and Gulobod.
