= Xoʻjaobod District =

Coordinates: 40.8000°N 71.7167°E

Xoʻjaobod
- District
- Xo’jaobod tumani
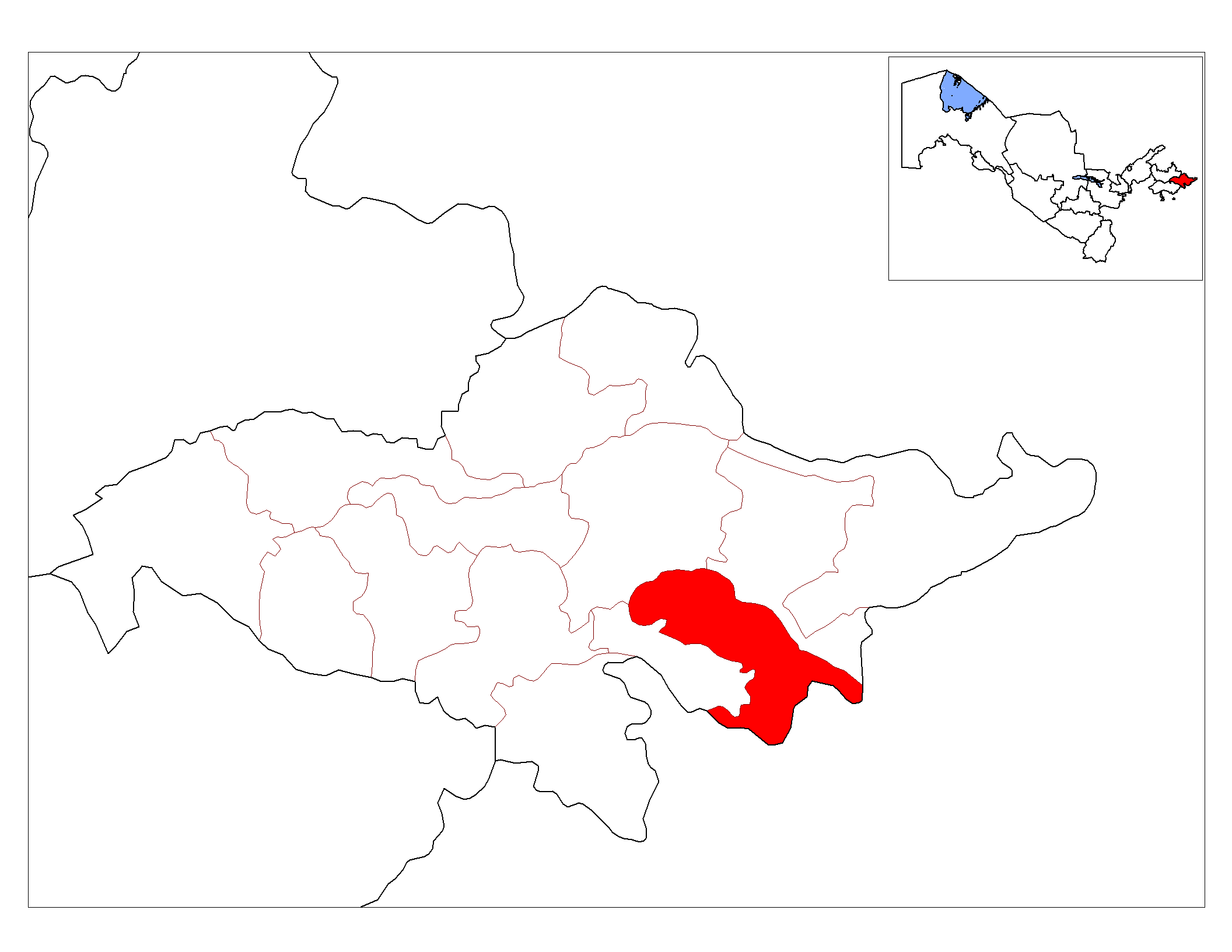
- Country: Uzbekistan
- Region: Andijan Region
- Capital: Xoʻjaobod
- Established: 1926

Area
  - Total: 230 km^{2} (89 sq mi)

Population (2022)
  - Total: 114,100
  - Density: 500/km^{2} (1,300/sq mi)
- Time zone: UTC+5 (UZT)

Xoʻjaobod (Khojaabad) is a tuman (district) of Andijan Region in Uzbekistan. The capital lies at the city Xoʻjaobod. It has an area of 230 km^{2} (89 sq mi) and it had 114,100 inhabitants in 2022.

The district consists of 1 city (Xoʻjaobod), 5 urban-type settlements (Guliston, Dilkushod, Koʻtarma, Manak and Xidirsha) and 4 rural communities.
