= Izboskan District =

Coordinates: 40.90°N 72.25°E

Izboskan
- District
- Izboskan tumani
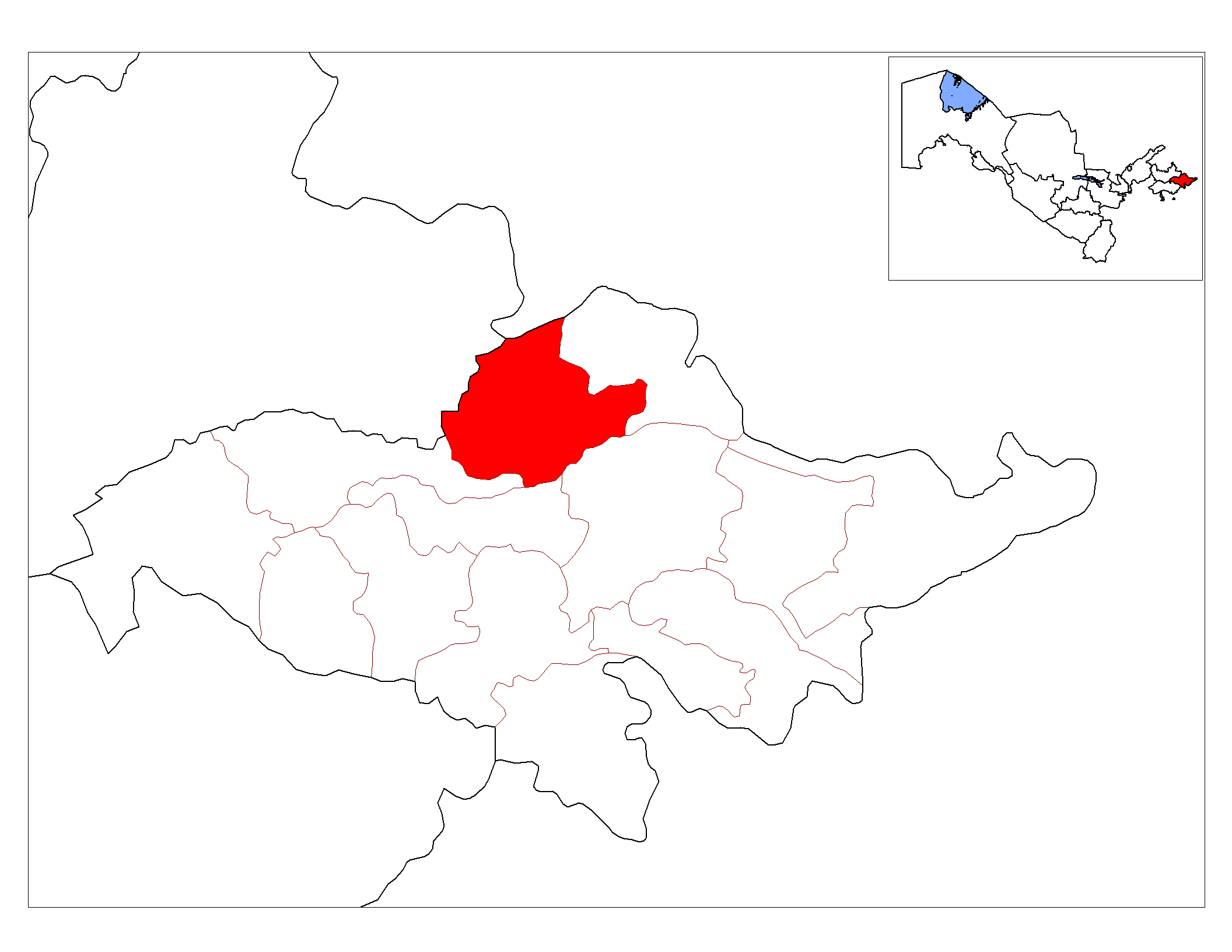
- Country: Uzbekistan
- Region: Andijan Region
- Capital: Paytug
- Established: 1926

Area
  - Total: 280 km^{2} (110 sq mi)

Population (2022)
  - Total: 245,600
  - Density: 880/km^{2} (2,300/sq mi)
- Time zone: UTC+5 (UZT)

Izboskan is a district of Andijan Region in Uzbekistan. The capital lies at the city Paytug. It has an area of 280 km^{2} (110 sq mi) and it had 245,600 inhabitants in 2022.

The district consists of 1 city (Paytug), 4 urban-type settlements (Gurkirov, Maygir, Toʻrtkoʻl and Uzun koʻcha) and 9 rural communities.
