= Xoʻjaobod =

- City
- Location in Uzbekistan
- Coordinates: 40°39′55″N 72°34′00″E
- Country: Uzbekistan
- Region: Andijan Region
- District: Xoʻjaobod District
- Town status: 1981

Population (2016)
  - Total: 20,200
- Time zone: UTC+5 (UZT)

Xoʻjaobod (Uzbek Cyrillic: Хўжаобод, pronounced [χɵˌdʒaɒˈbɒt], romanized: Khojaabad), or formerly Khodzhaabad (Russian: Ходжаабад), is a town in Andijan Region, Uzbekistan. It is the administrative center of Xoʻjaobod District. Its population was 12,831 in 1989, and 20,200 in 2016.

Xoʻjaobod is the site of the Dustlik border crossing leading to Osh, Kyrgyzstan, which has been unused in recent years.
