= Qoʻrgʻontepa =

- City
- Location in Uzbekistan
- Coordinates: 40°44′01″N 72°45′30″E
- Country: Uzbekistan
- Region: Andijan Region
- District: Qoʻrgʻontepa District
- City status: 1976
- Elevation: 693 m (2,274 ft)

Population (2016)
  - Total: 30,800
- Time zone: UTC+5 (UZT)
- Postal code: 170700
- Area code: (+998) 7631
- Vehicle registration: 60

Qoʻrgʻontepa (Uzbek: Qoʻrgʻontepa, Қўрғонтепа, Russian: Кургантепа) is a small city and seat of Qoʻrgʻontepa District, in Andijan Region in eastern Uzbekistan. It is located roughly 30 kilometres (19 mi) north of Osh, near the border with Kyrgyzstan. In 1989 it had a population of 19,565, and 30,800 in 2016. In 1976 Qo’rg’ontepa was granted city status. The city has a cotton factory, a tool factory and sewing factory. The city is located on the Uzbek Railways Andijan-Karasu line.
