= Xonobod =

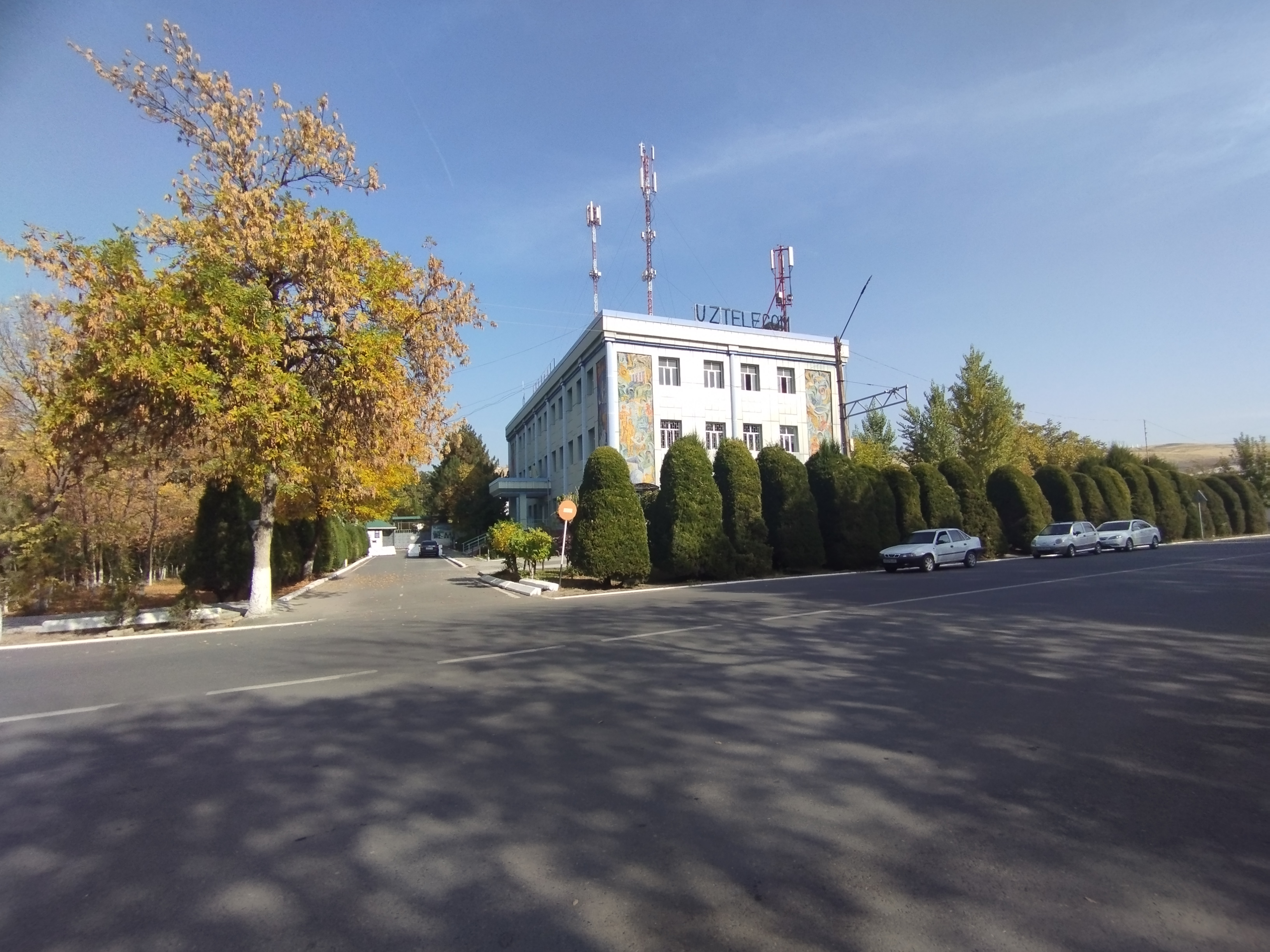

- Location in Uzbekistan
- Coordinates: 40°48′N 73°0′E
- Country: Uzbekistan
- Region: Andijan Region
- Tuman/City: Xonobod

Area
  - Total: 20 km^{2} (7.7 sq mi)

Population (2022)
  - Total: 44,000
  - Density: 2,200/km^{2} (5,700/sq mi)

Xonobod (in 1972—91 Sovetabad, Uzbek: Xonobod, Хонобод Russian: Ханабад, romanized: Khanabad) is a district-level city in Andijan Region, Uzbekistan. It has an area of 20 km^{2} (7.7 sq mi) and 44,000 inhabitants (2020). It lies to the east of Andijan in the Ferghana Valley, on the right bank of the Kara Darya.

== See also ==
- List of renamed cities in Uzbekistan
