= Boʻz =

Urban-type settlement in Uzbekistan

- urban-type settlement
- Location in Uzbekistan
- Coordinates: 40°41′00″N 71°55′00″E
- Country: Uzbekistan
- Region: Andijan Region
- District: Boʻston District
- Urban-type settlement status: 1983

Population (1989)
  - Total: 9,294
- Time zone: UTC+5 (UZT)

Boʻz (Uzbek: Boʻz, Бўз, Russian: Боз) is an urban-type settlement in Andijan Region, Uzbekistan. It is the administrative center of Boʻston District.
