= Oltinkoʻl, Andijan Region =

Oltinkoʻl
- Village
- Location in Uzbekistan
- Coordinates: 40°48′00″N 72°10′00″E
- Country: Uzbekistan
- Region: Andijan Region
- District: Oltinkoʻl District

Population (2001)
  - Total: 6,500
- Time zone: UTC+5 (UZT)

Oltinkoʻl (Uzbek: Oltinko‘l, Олтинкўл, Russian: Алтынкуль) is a village in Andijan Region, Uzbekistan. It is administrative center of Oltinkoʻl District. The village population in 1989 was 3,697 people.
