= Boʻston District =

Coordinates: 40.6833°N 71.9167°E

- District
- Boʻston tumani
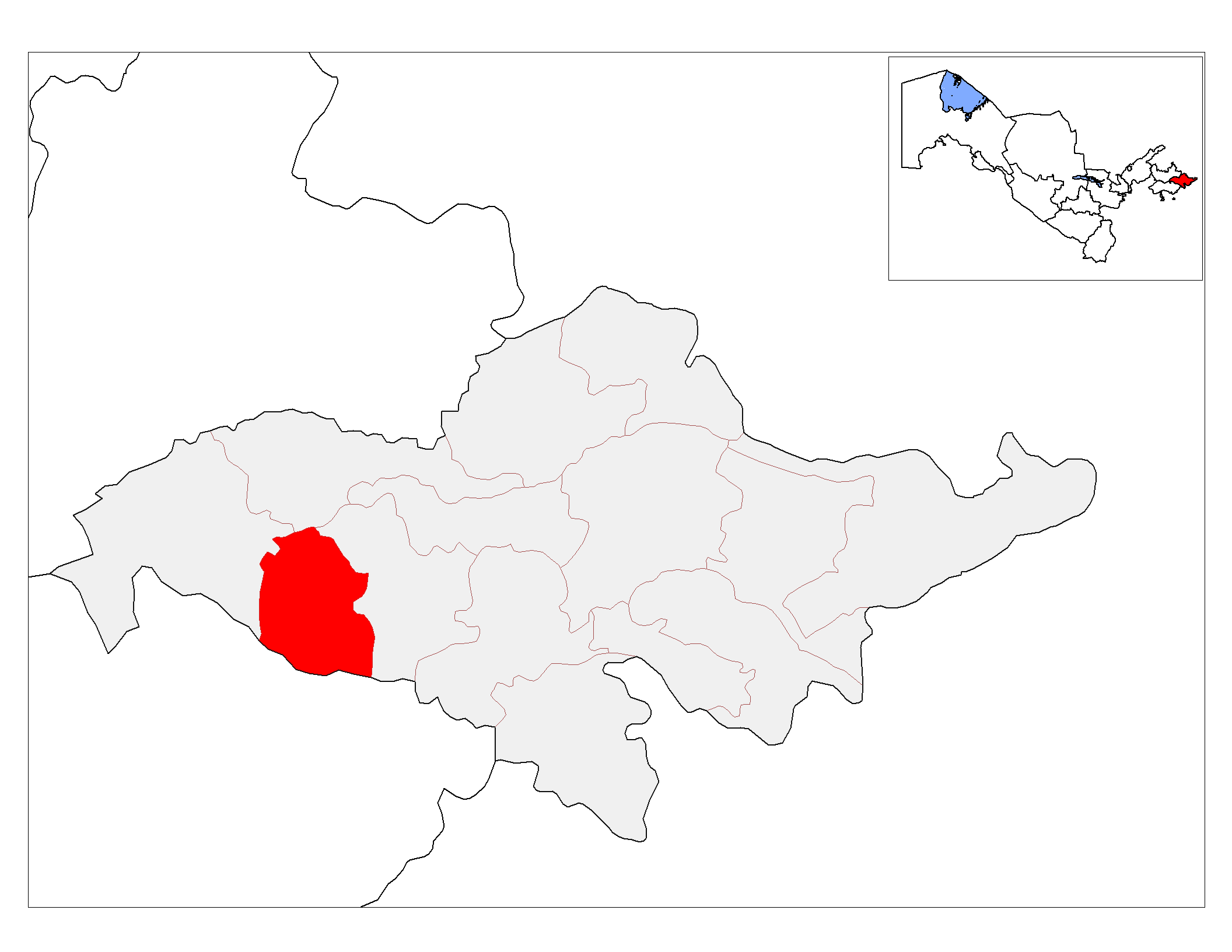
- Country: Uzbekistan
- Region: Andijan Region
- Capital: Boʻz
- Established: 1950

Area
  - Total: 200 km^{2} (77 sq mi)

Population (2022)
  - Total: 74,800
  - Density: 370/km^{2} (970/sq mi)
- Time zone: UTC+5 (UZT)

Boʻston District (Uzbek: Boʻston tumani, before 2019: Boʻz District) is a district of Andijan Region in Uzbekistan. The capital lies at Boʻz. It has an area of 200 km^{2} (77 sq mi) and it had 74,800 inhabitants in 2022.

The district consists of three urban-type settlements (Boʻz, Jalolov and Xoldevonbek) and three rural communities.
