= Oltinkoʻl District =

Oltinkoʻl District Oltinkoʻl tumani
- District
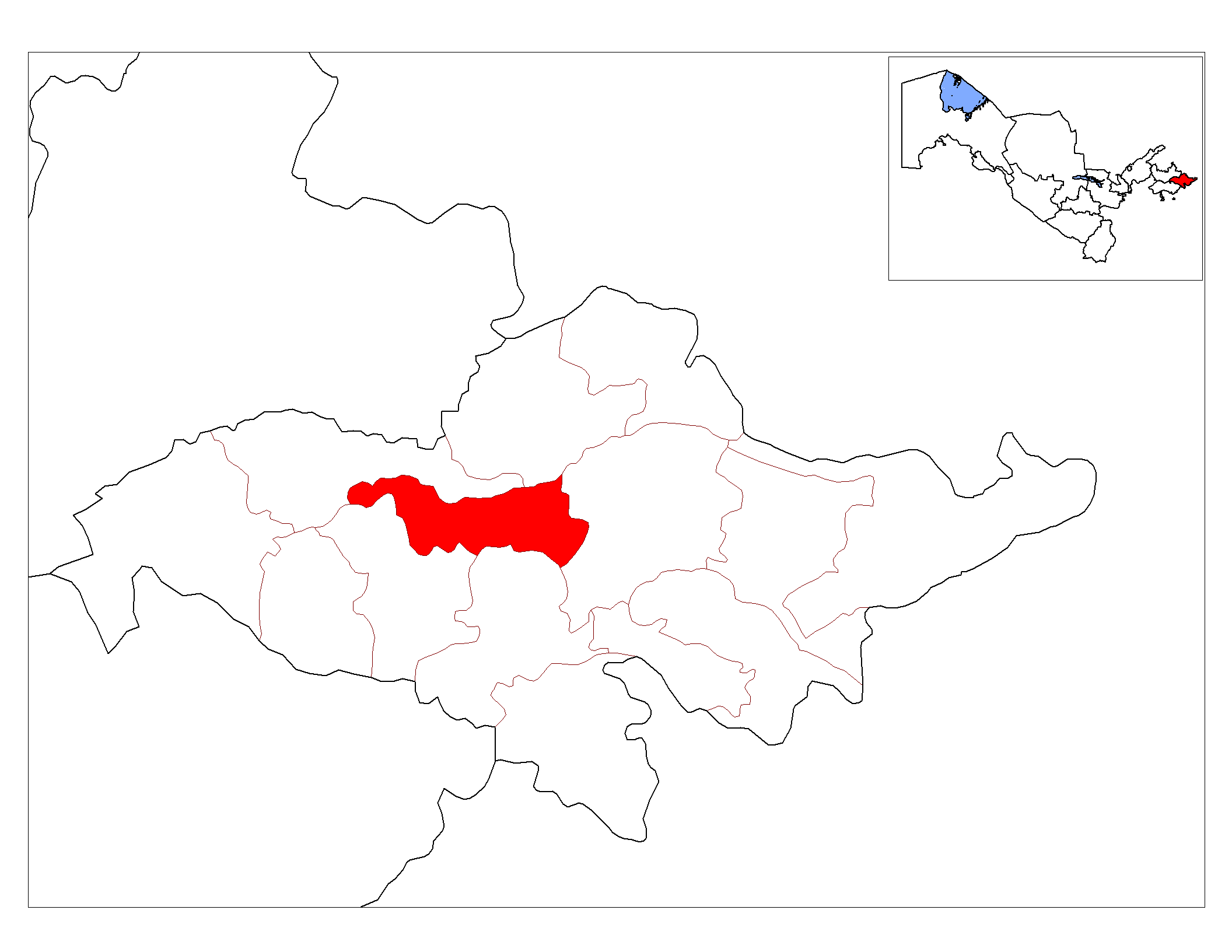
- Location in Andijan Region
- Coordinates: 40°42′N 72°10′E
- Country: Uzbekistan
- Region: Andijan Region
- Capital: Oltinkoʻl
- Established: June 26, 1939

Area
  - Total: 210 km^{2} (81 sq mi)

Population (2022)
  - Total: 184,700
  - Density: 880/km^{2} (2,300/sq mi)
- Time zone: UTC+5 (UZT)

Oltinkoʻl District (Uzbek: Oltinkoʻl tumani, Олтинкўл тумани, Russian: Алтынкульский район) is a district of Andijan Region, Uzbekistan. The seat of the district is the village Oltinkoʻl. The district was established on June 26, 1939. It has an area of 210 km^{2} (81 sq mi) and it had 184,700 inhabitants in 2022.

== Administrative divisions ==
The district consists of 11 urban-type settlements and 8 rural communities:

Urban-type settlements	Rural communities
Boʻston; Dalvarzin; Ijtimoiyat; Jalabek; Kumakay; Madaniy mehnat; Markaz; Maslahat; Namuna; Qoʻshtepa; Xondibogʻi	Jalabek (13 villages); Kumakay (2 villages); Maslahat (6 villages); Oltinkoʻl (2 villages); Oraziy (3 villages); Oxunboboyev (4 villages); Qoʻshtepasaroy (6 villages); Suvyulduz (14 villages)

== Geography ==
Oltinkoʻl District lies in the central part of Andijan Region in eastern Uzbekistan. The relief is represented by lowlands and hills. The climate is subtropical high upland, with an average July temperature of 25-28 ˚ C, and an average February temperature of -5 - -7 ˚ C. Sometimes in summer the temperature reaches as high as 43 ˚ C, and as low as -18 ˚ C in the winter. The growing season is 160 – 180 days, with an average annual rainfall of up to 225 mm. Wild animals are rare, but there are rodents, reptiles and birds.
