= Qoʻrgʻontepa District =

Coordinates: 40°44′N 72°46′E

- District
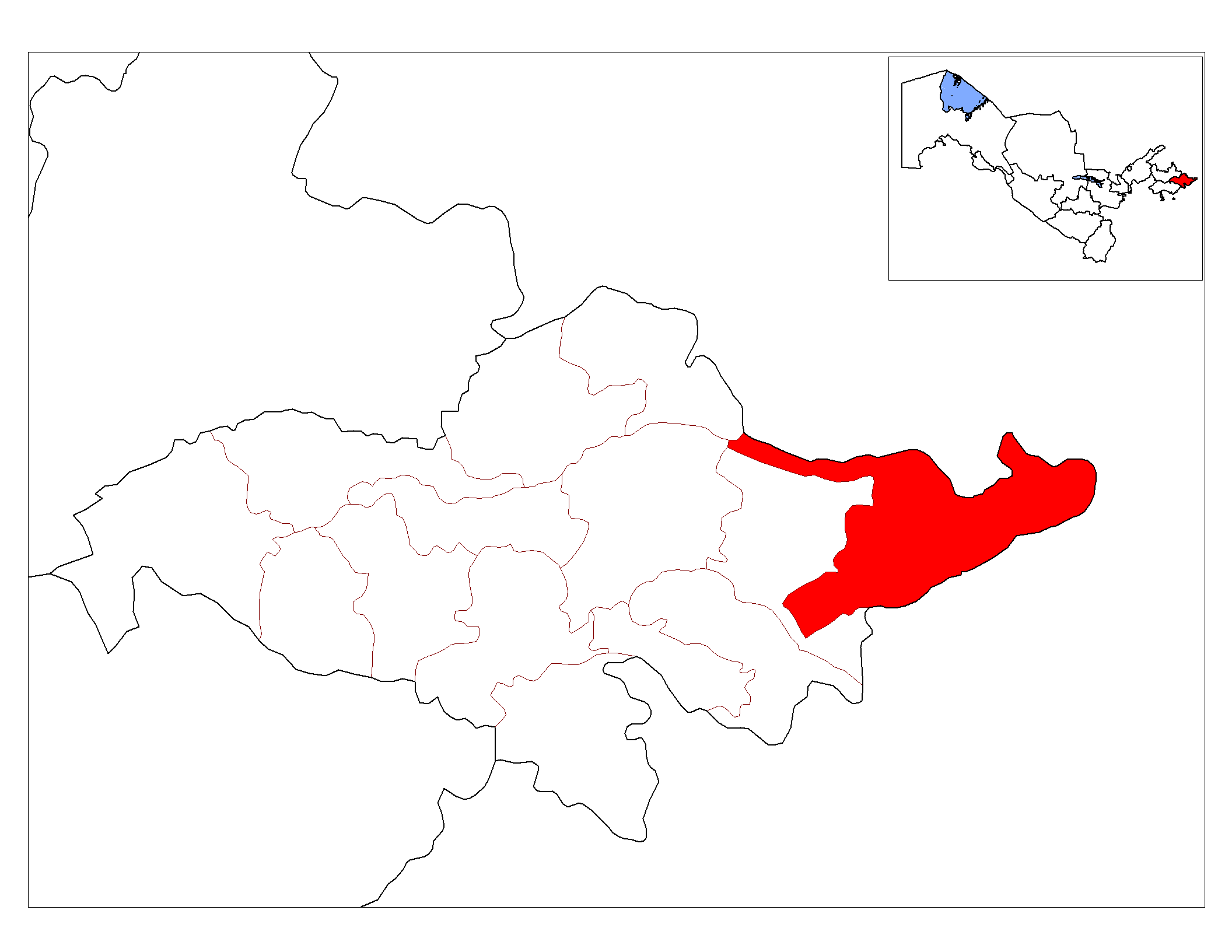
- Location in Andijan Region
- Country: Uzbekistan
- Region: Andijan Region
- Capital: Qoʻrgʻontepa

Area
  - Total: 460 km^{2} (180 sq mi)

Population (2022)
  - Total: 222,100
  - Density: 480/km^{2} (1,300/sq mi)
- Time zone: UTC+5 (UZT)

Qoʻrgʻontepa District is a district of Andijan Region, Uzbekistan. The capital of the district is the city Qoʻrgʻontepa. The district was established on September 29, 1926. It has an area of 460 km^{2} (180 sq mi) and it had 222,100 inhabitants in 2022.

== Administrative divisions ==
The district consists of two cities (Qoʻrgʻontepa and Qorasuv), one urban-type settlement (Sultonobod) and five village councils (Chimyon, Dardoq, Qoʻrgʻontepa, Savay and Sultonobod).
