= Shahrixon =

- City
- Location in Uzbekistan
- Coordinates: 40°43′00″N 72°03′00″E
- Country: Uzbekistan
- Region: Andijan Region
- District: Shahrixon District
- Town status: 1970

Population (2016)
  - Total: 71,400
- Time zone: UTC+5 (UZT)

Shahrixon (Uzbek: Shahrixon, Шаҳрихон, Russian: Шахрихан, romanized: Shakhrikhan) is a city in Andijan Region, Uzbekistan. It is the administrative center of Shahrixon District. Its population was 45,200 in 1989, and 71,400 in 2016.
