= Shahrixon District =

Coordinates: 40°43′N 72°03′E

- District
- Shahrixon tumani
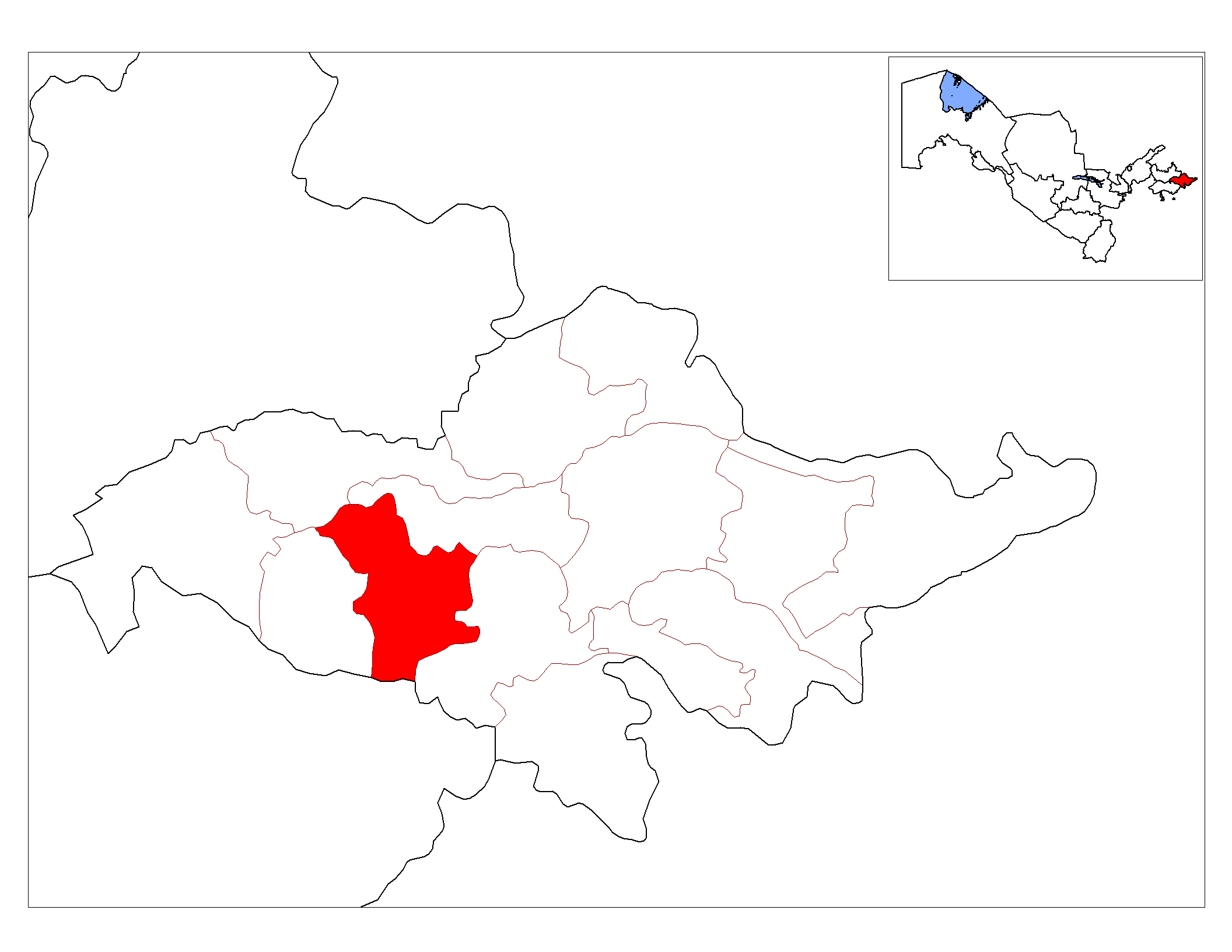
- Country: Uzbekistan
- Region: Andijan Region
- Capital: Shakhrihon
- Established: 1926, September 29

Area
  - Total: 290 km^{2} (110 sq mi)

Population (2024, January 1.)
  - Total: 324,439 inhabitants which had a 1,023% increase in total population (more than 7,244 people) as opposed to 2,023
- Time zone: UTC+5 (UZT)
- Postal code: 171600

Shahrixon District (Uzbek: Shahrixon tumani, Шаҳрихон тумани) is a tuman (district) of Andijan Region in Uzbekistan. The capital lies at the city Shahrixon. It has an area of 290 km^{2} (110 sq mi) and it had 310,000 inhabitants in 2022.

The district consists of 1 city (Shahrixon), 3 urban-type settlements (Vaxim, Choʻja and Segazaqum) and 12 rural communities (incl. Nazarmaxram).

The kishlak of Nazarmaxram, located in the district, was the district center of Xoldevonbek District, abolished in 1962.
