= Andijan Region =

Region of Uzbekistan

Andijan Region Andijon viloyati
- Region
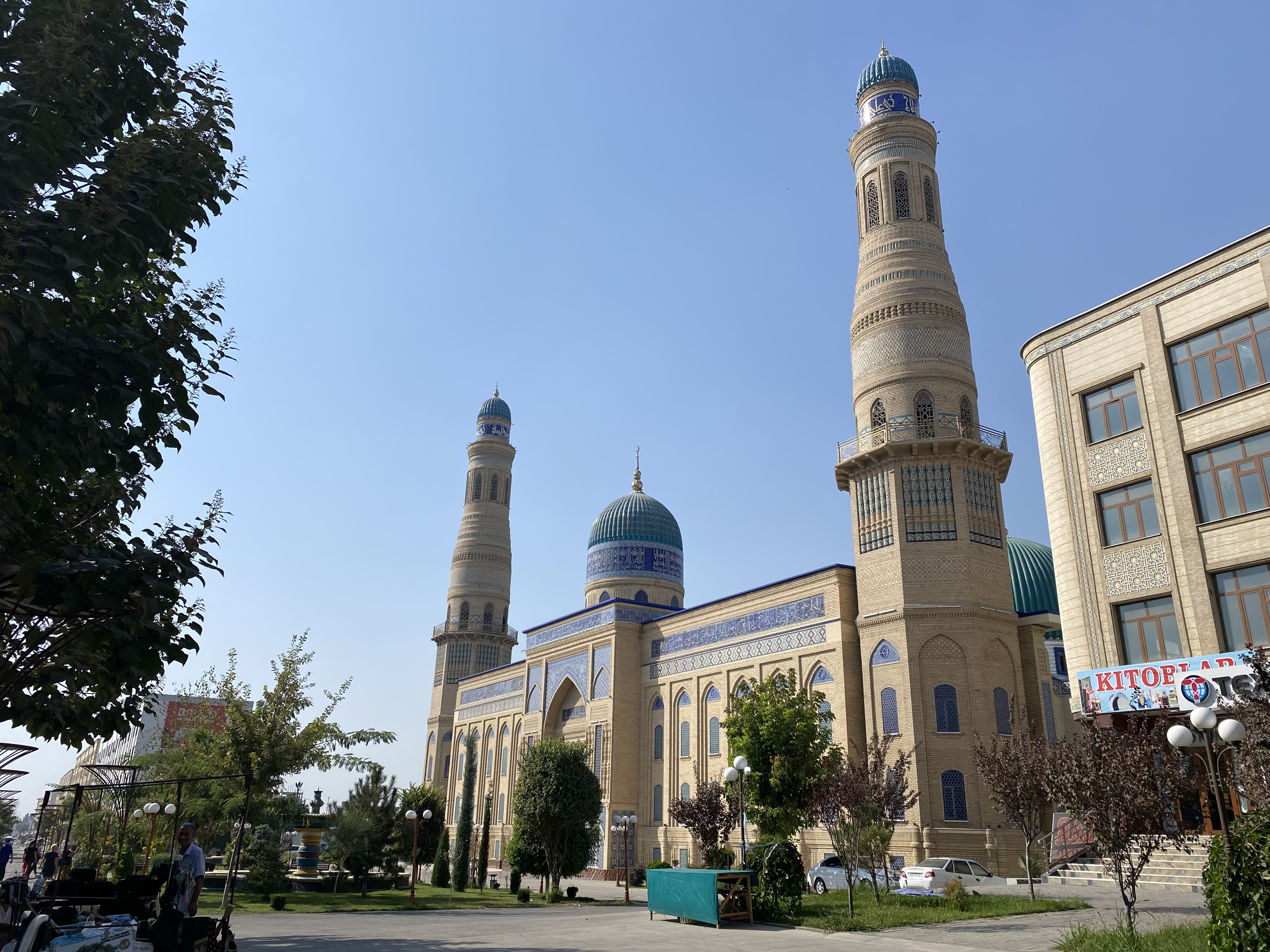
- Jami Mosque in Andijan

- Andijan in Uzbekistan
- Coordinates: 40°45′N 72°10′E
- Country: Uzbekistan
- Capital: Andijan

Government
  - Hokim: Shuhratbek Abdurahmonov

Area
  - Total: 4,303 km^{2} (1,661 sq mi)

Population (2022)
  - Total: 3,253,528
  - Density: 756.1/km^{2} (1,958/sq mi)
- Time zone: UTC+5 (East)
  - Summer (DST): UTC+5 (not observed)
- ISO 3166 code: UZ-AN
- Districts: 14
- Cities: 11
- Townships: 0
- Villages: 95
- Website: www.andijan.uz

Andijan Region (Note: Uzbek: Андижон вилояти, romanized: Andijon viloyati, IPA: [ændɨˈdʒɒn ʋɪ̆lɒjæˈtʰɪ̆]) (Note: Formerly known as Andizhan Oblast (from Russian Андижанская область).) is a region of Uzbekistan, located in the eastern part of the Fergana Valley in far eastern Uzbekistan. It borders with Kyrgyzstan (Jalal-Abad and Osh Regions), Fergana Region and Namangan Region. It covers an area of 4,300 km^{2}. The population is estimated to be around 3,253,528 as of 2022, thus making Andijan Region the most densely populated region of Uzbekistan.

The origin of the name of the place is uncertain. Arab geographers of the 10th century referred to Andijan as "Andukan," "Andugan," or "Andigan." Some historians link the name of the place to the Turkic tribal names Andi and Adoq/Azoq. The traditional etymology connects the name with the Turkic ethnonym Gandhi (Gandhi Turks), known from pre-Islamic period.

Andijan Region is divided into 14 administrative districts. The capital is the city of Andijan. The climate is a typically continental climate with extreme differences between winter and summer temperatures.

Natural resources include deposits of petroleum, natural gas, ozokerite and limestone. As with other regions of Uzbekistan, it is famous for its very sweet melons and watermelons, but cultivation of crops can be accomplished exclusively on irrigated lands. Main agriculture includes cotton, cereal, viticulture, cattle raising and vegetable gardening.

Industry includes metal processing, chemical industry, light industry, food processing. The first automobile assembly plant in Central Asia was opened in Asaka in Andijan Region by the Uzbek-Korean joint venture, UzDaewoo, which produces Nexia and Tico cars and the Damas minibus.

== Administrative divisions ==
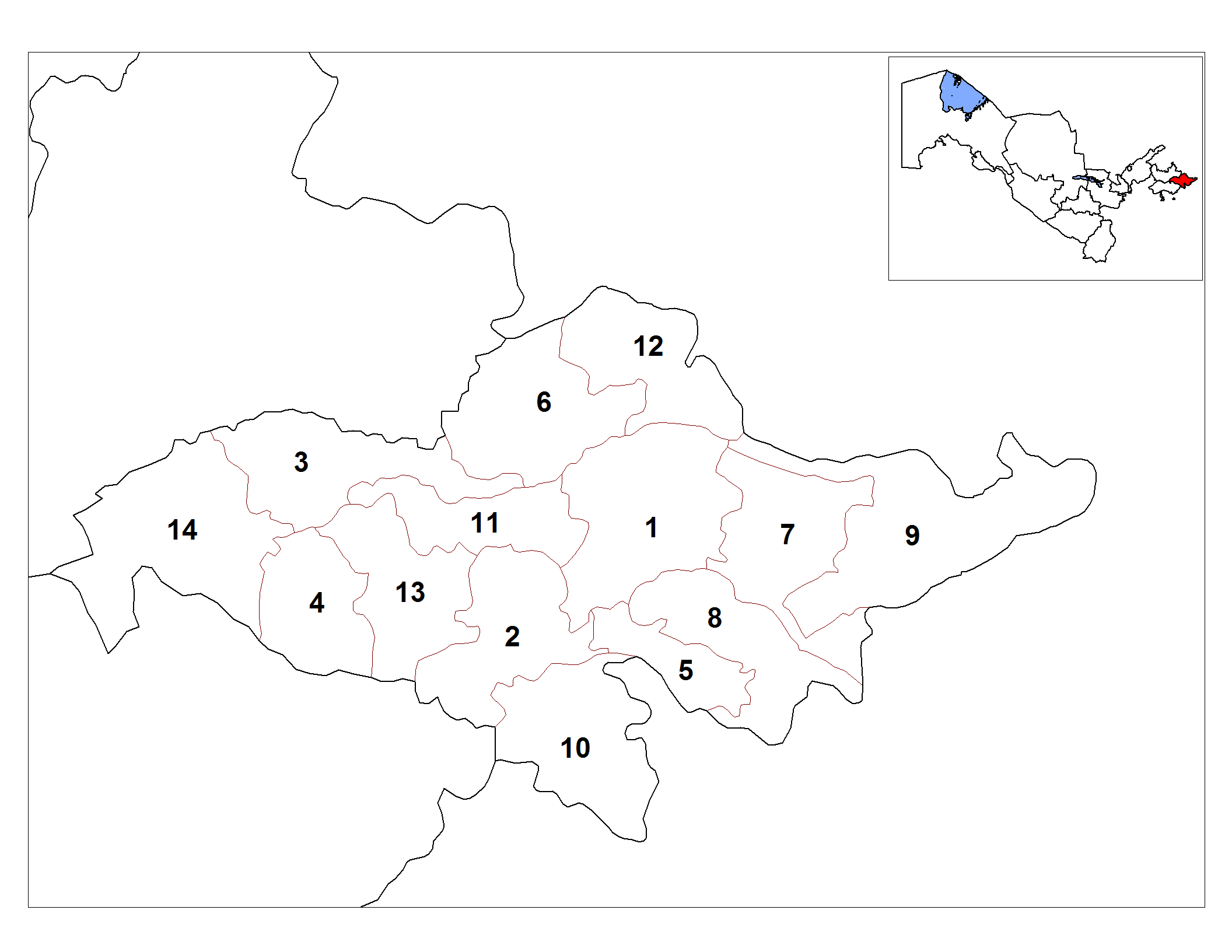
Districts of Andijan

The Andijan Region consists of 14 districts (listed below) and two district-level cities: Andijan and Xonobod.

	District name	District capital
1	Andijan District	Kuyganyor
2	Asaka District	Asaka
3	Baliqchi District	Baliqchi
4	Boʻston District	Boʻz
5	Buloqboshi District	Buloqboshi
6	Izboskan District	Poytugʻ
7	Jalaquduq District	Jalaquduq
8	Xoʻjaobod District	Xoʻjaobod
9	Qoʻrgʻontepa District	Qoʻrgʻontepa
10	Marhamat District	Marhamat
11	Oltinkoʻl District	Oltinkol
12	Paxtaobod District	Paxtaobod
13	Shahrixon District	Shahrixon
14	Ulugʻnor District	Oqoltin

There are 11 cities (Andijan, Xonobod, Jalaquduq, Poytugʻ, Qoʻrgʻontepa, Qorasuv, Asaka, Marhamat, Shahrixon, Paxtaobod, Xoʻjaobod) and 79 urban-type settlements in the Andijan Region.
