= Liam Harrison (kickboxer) =

English Muay Thai fighter

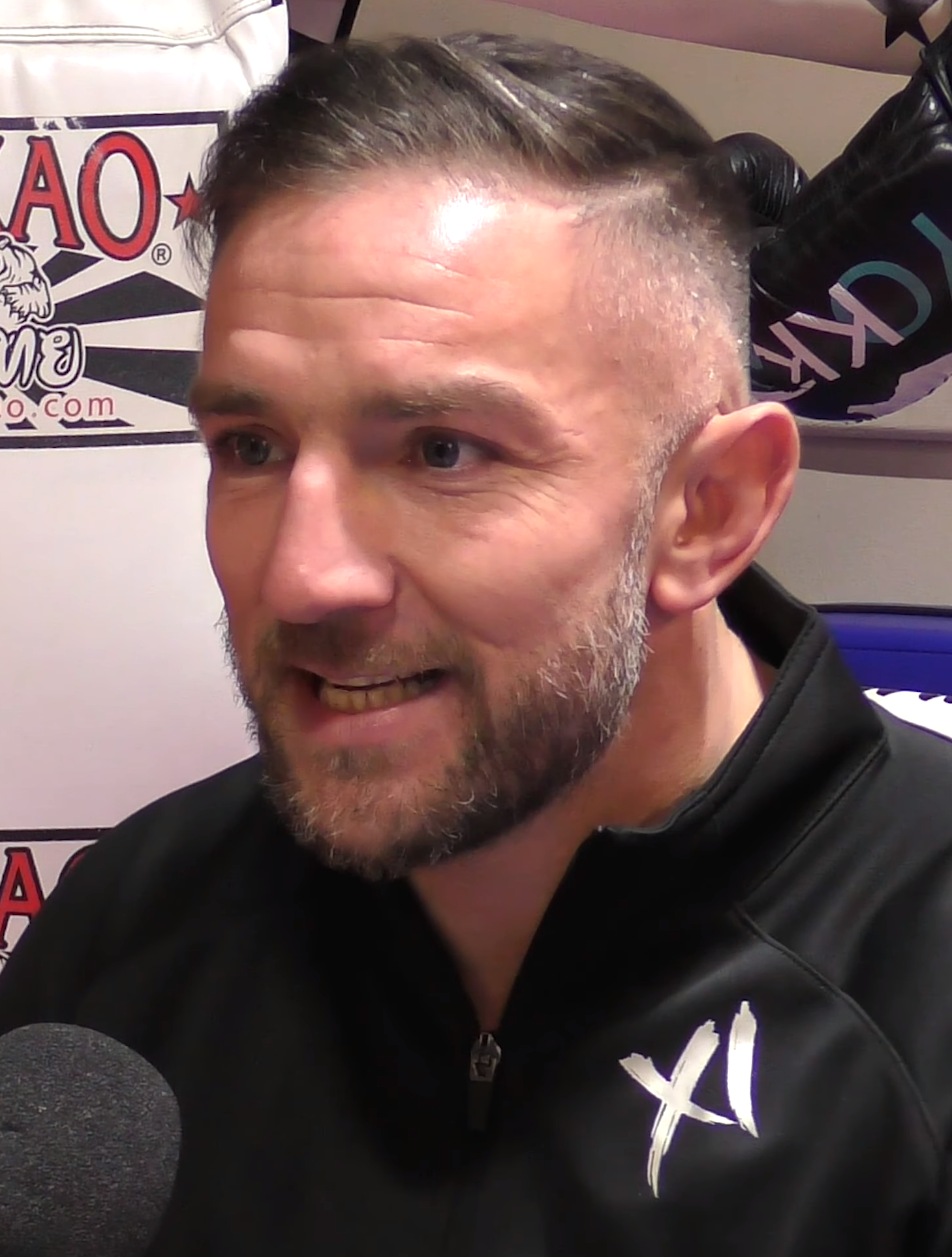
- Harrison in 2021
- Born: 5 October 1985 (age 41)
- Other names: The Hitman
- Nationality: English
- Height: 1.70 m (5 ft 7 in)
- Weight: 65.8 kg (145 lb; 10.36 st)
- Division: Welterweight; Light welterweight Lightweight
- Reach: 68.5 in (174 cm)
- Style: Muay Thai
- Stance: Orthodox
- Fighting out of: Leeds, England
- Team: Bad Company Thai Boxing Gym (England); Jitti Gym (Thailand); Yokkao Training Center (Thailand)
- Trainer: Richard Smith
- Years active: 2000–present

Kickboxing record
- Total: 120
- Wins: 92
- By knockout: 50
- Losses: 26
- Draws: 2

Liam "The Hitman" Harrison (born 5 October 1985) is an English welterweight Muay Thai fighter currently signed to ONE Championship. He is a former Yokkao, W.A.K.O. Pro, WBC Muaythai and WMC world champion.

== Background ==
Brought up in Leeds, Harrison first started training in Muay Thai aged 13, when he joined the Bad Company gym in Harehills. There he trained under Richard Smith, still his current trainer, who is a former British, Commonwealth and European kickboxing champion. Harrison was large for his age and made his amateur debut aged 14, winning in a no head contact fight. He made his pro debut not much later, just before his fifteenth birthday, defeating Martin Shivnan via knockout in around 30 seconds. Success on his pro debut led to a number of victories on the local scene culminating in a bout for the S.I.M.T.A. Northern Area title, which he won against opponent Abdul Arif, again by first-round knockout.

== Career ==
Between 2000 and 2004, Harrison established himself as the top fighter in the United Kingdom in his weight class, having moved up from featherweight (52 kg/114.4 lbs) to light welterweight (63.5 kg/139.7 lbs) and having beaten domestic and international competition including Ait Said Aberderahman, Preechapon Por Nuongubon, Satoruvasikoba. At the end of 2004 Harrison travelled to Italy where he was supposed to face reigning champion Massimo Rizzoli for his W.A.K.O. low-kick kickboxing world title. Rizzoli suffered an injury and Harrison faced the W.A.K.O. European champion Emannuel Di Profetis instead. Despite the late change of opponent and fighting in a rule set different from Muay Thai, Harrison won the match by technical knockout to become world champion.

The win in Italy was followed by success at home when Harrison defeated Dutch-based kickboxer Mohamed Ajuou to claim the European version of the S.I.M.T.A. belt. In following fights Harrison beat Abdoulaye M'baye and Benzouaoua Hakim as well as Hiromasa Masuda in a rematch from 2003 and was still undefeated into 2005. He made his Thai debut in August of that year, losing a split decision to Witthayanoi Sitkuanem at Rajadamnern Stadium in what was the first defeat of his pro career. Harrison suffered a second consecutive loss a few months later on his return to England, losing to another Thai in Duwao Kongudom who was a highly rated Omnoi Stadium champion, in a match in Wolverhampton.

Despite suffering two defeats including losing his Thai debut Harrison headed back to Thailand at the end of 2005. He won his first title on Thai soil by defeating a much bigger Russian opponent to claim the Patong Stadium belt at 68 kg (149.6 lbs). With his first victory in Thailand, Harrison strung together five more victories in the country throughout 2006 which included winning the W.P.M.F. light welterweight belt against reigning champion Masa Hiroshima as well as retaining his Patong stadium title. He also re-matched Witthayanoi Sitkuanem, but was again unsuccessful. That year was awarded the "Leeds Sports Federation Sportsman of the Year" award.

Throughout 2007 Harrison fought primarily in Thailand, basing himself at the Jitti Gym in Bangkok. He fought a number of bouts at the major stadiums including at Lumpinee Stadium, managing to successful defend his W.P.M.F. world title two times that year. He also made brief forays back to the United Kingdom, facing W.M.C. world champion Numphon PK Sterio two times that year. Harrison lost the first match between the pair, but won the second in Manchester in November via a fourth-round KO, picking up his biggest victory up to that point as well as winning the W.M.C. lightweight world title. He was also named as the Muay Siam magazine's top foreign fighter of the year.

In 2008 Harrison fought a number of bouts at Bad Company promoted shows in his home town of Leeds, with wins over Benabdeljelil Mehdi and Masaru Ito. He also retained his W.M.C. lightweight world title by stopping Sarmsamut Kiatchongkao in June of that year. In 2009 Harrison lost a decision to Saenchai Sor Kingstar in London. He then headed to Jamaica to face Anuwat Kaewsamrit, being defeated via TKO and losing his W.M.C. world title in what was his first ever stoppage loss.

Harrison would gain revenge against Anuwat Kaewsamrit in March 2010, defeating him by unanimous decision over five rounds in their rematch in Manchester. Although Anuwat was not at his peak anymore he was Harrison's best victory up to date. He would also have the chance to enhance his name by entering the inaugural Thai Fight competition, an event involving sixteen Muay Thai fighters at 67 kg/147.4 lbs with a first place prize of 2,000,000 Baht (around $62,000). Despite being one of the smaller fighters at the tournament he outworked Behzad Rafigh Doust in his first match forcing him to quit in the second round. Going into the quarter-finals, Harrison knocked out Soishiro Miyakoshi with elbows. Harrison was later disqualified from the tournament for coming in over the weight. He insisted it being the result of a sickness he caught prior to the match.

In 2011 Harrison had two rematches against opponents who had defeated him in the past. He lost both of them, against Saenchai Sor Kingstar and Petaswin Seatranferry, who had defeated him at an event in Glasgow the previous year.

On 31 March 2012 he beat Andrei Kulebin by TKO in round 3 using his kicks.

Harrison lost to Saenchai PKSaenchaimuaythaigym for the third time at Muay Thai Warriors in Macau on 9 December 2012, losing a clear-cut unanimous decision.

He competed in the Glory 8: Tokyo - 2013 65 kg Slam in Tokyo, Japan on 3 May 2013. He lost to Masaaki Noiri via TKO due to a cut in round two in the quarter-finals.

He lost to Sagetdao Petpayathai by decision in the semi-finals of a four-man 68 kg tournament at MAX Muay Thai 3 in Zhengzhou, China on 10 August 2013.

Harrison stopped his four-fight losing streak with a unanimous decision victory over Dylan Salvador at The Main Event 2013 in Manchester, England on 2 November 2013.

He was set to fight Damien Alamos for his Yokkao promotional debut at Yokkao 8 in Bolton, England on 8 March 2014 but Alamos withdrew from the fight, claiming to have a hand injury, and was replaced by Houcine Bennoui. He defeated Bennoui on points in a five-round −65 kg Muay Thai bout.

Harrison defended his Yokkao 65 kg title on 25 March 2017 at Yokkao 24 against Ryan Mekki.

On 8 March 2025 Harrison claimed the WBC Diamond Belt after defeating Spain's Isaac Araya.

Harrison holds notable wins over Muangthai P.K.Saenchai, Tetsuya Yamato, Malaipet Sasiprapa, Andrei Kulebin, Anuwat Kaewsamrit, and Dzhabar Askerov.

=== ONE Championship ===
In 2018, Harrison linked a non-exclusive deal with ONE Championship to compete in ONE Super Series Muay Thai. He lost his first two bouts to Petchmorakot Petchyindee Academy at ONE: Destiny of Champions and Rodlek at ONE: Legendary Quest, but won by first-round KO in his third bout with the organization at ONE: A New Tomorrow against Mohammed Bin Mahmoud.

Harrison faced Muangthai P.K.Saenchai at ONE 156 on 22 April 2022. He won the fight by a first-round technical knockout. Harrison was awarded a $100,000 bonus for winning the fight.

Harrison faced Nong-O Gaiyanghadao for the ONE Bantamweight Muay Thai World Championship at ONE on Prime Video 1 on 27 August 2022. He lost the bout in the first round after being unable to continue due to leg kicks.

Harrison was scheduled to face Pongsiri P.K.Saenchai on 14 January 2023, at ONE Fight Night 6. However, Harrison withdrew from the event due to injuries and requiring surgery. As a result, the bout was scrapped. Harrison was scheduled to fight former unified multiple division champion Floyd Mayweather Jr. in an exhibition bout, but pulled out.

After a 16-month and 14-day hiatus due to injury, Harrison was scheduled to face John Lineker on 13 January 2024, at ONE Fight Night 18. However, Harrison suffered a knee injury and the bout was scrapped.

Harrison was scheduled to face Katsuki Kitano on 8 June 2024, at ONE 167. However, the bout was removed from the event after both fighters missed weight.

Harrison faced Saeksan Or. Kwanmuang on 6 September 2024, at ONE 168. He lost the bout via technical knockout after being knocked down three times, and appeared to be retiring after the bout by laying his gloves on the canvas.

Harrison returned from retirement against Isaac Araya for the WBC Muay Thai Diamond title on 8 March 2025, at Hitman Fight League 7. He won the title via technical knockout in round three.

Harrison was scheduled to face Soe Lin Oo on 1 August 2025, at ONE 173. In 2019, Harrison said that he would fight anyone under Lethwei rules. Which prompted Lethwei world champion Dave Leduc to offer US$10,000 to a charity in Myanmar if Harrison would to fight Soe Lin Oo in a Lethwei fight at World Lethwei Championship, but the fight never materialized.

== Titles and accomplishments ==
Titles

- Yokkao
  - Yokkao World 65 kg Title. (1 def.)
- Kombat League
  - 2016 Kombat League World Champion
- WBC Muaythai
  - 2014 WBC Muaythai (147 lbs) World Champion
  - 2011 WBC Muaythai (147 lbs) International Champion
  - 2025 WBC Diamond World Champion
- World Muaythai Council
  - 2007–09 W.M.C. Muaythai Lightweight World Champion −61.5 kg (1 title defence)
- World Professional Muaythai Federation
  - 2006–07 W.P.M.F. Muaythai World Champion −63.5 kg (2 title defences – vacated)
- Patong Stadium
  - 2006 Patong Stadium Muaythai Super Welterweight Champion −68 kg (1 title defence)
- Sitnarong International Muaythai Association
  - 2005 S.I.M.T.A. Muaythai Lightweight European Champion −61.5 kg
  - 2001 S.I.M.T.A. Muaythai Super Featherweight Northern Area Champion −52 kg
- World Association of Kickboxing Organizations
  - 2004 W.A.K.O. Pro Low-kick Kickboxing World Champion −62 kg

Awards

- 2007/08 Leeds Sports Federation Sportsman of the Year winner
- 2007 Muay Siam Magazine Foreign Fighter of the Year winner
- 2006/07 Leeds Sports Federation Sportsman of the Year winner
- 2004/05 Leeds Sports Federation Sportsman of the Year runner up

== Fight record ==
Professional Muay Thai and kickboxing record
91 wins (49 (T)KOs), 26 losses, 2 draws
Date	Result	Opponent	Event	Location	Method	Round	Time
2025-03-08	Win	(Spain) Isaac Araya	Hitman Fight League	Manchester, England	TKO (leg kick)	3	2:15
For the WBC Muay Thai Diamond Belt
2024-09-06	Loss	(Thailand) Saeksan Or. Kwanmuang	ONE 168	Denver, Colorado, United States	TKO (3 knockdowns)	2	1:49
2022-08-27	Loss	(Thailand) Nong-O Gaiyanghadao	ONE on Prime Video 1	Kallang, Singapore	TKO (leg kick)	1	2:10
For the ONE Bantamweight Muay Thai World Championship.
2022-04-22	Win	(Thailand) Muangthai P.K.Saenchai	ONE 156	Kallang, Singapore	TKO (3 knockdowns)	1	2:16
2021-10-09	Win	(France) Brayan Matias	Road to ONE: Muay Thai Grand Prix	London, England	Decision	5	3:00
2020-03-07	Win	(Spain) Khyzer Hayat	Yokkao 48	Bolton, England	Decision	5	3:00
2020-01-10	Win	(Malaysia) Mohammed Bin Mahmoud	ONE Championship: A New Tomorrow	Bangkok, Thailand	KO (punches)	1	2:03
2019-08-05	Win	(Italy) Cristian Faustino	Yokkao 41	Dublin, Ireland	TKO (doctor stoppage)	4	3:00
2019-06-15	Loss	(Thailand) Rodlek Jaotalaytong	ONE Championship: Legendary Quest	China	Decision (unanimous)	3	3:00
2019-01-26	Win	(Italy) Ivan Naccari	Yokkao 36	Italy	Decision	3	3:00
2018-12-07	Loss	(Thailand) Phetmorakot Wor Sangprapai	ONE Championship: Destiny of Champions	Malaysia	KO (left elbow)	2	1:15
2018-07-07	Loss	(England) Charlie Peters	Muay Thai Grand Prix 17	London, England	Decision (unanimous)	5	3:00
2017-12-09	Loss	(France) Bobo Sacko	Golden Fight	France	Decision (unanimous)	5	3:00
2017-10-15	Win	(Germany) Kevin Burmester	Yokkao 27	Bolton, England	TKO (low kick)	2	1:00
2017-08-26	Win	(France) Charles François	Science of 8 Promotions	United Kingdom	TKO (three knockdowns)	3	
2017-03-25	Win	(France) Rayan Mekki	Yokkao 24	Bolton, England	TKO	3	2:20
Retained Yokkao 65 kg title .
2017-02-12	Win	(Spain) Jesus Romero	TML1	Manchester, England	Decision (unanimous)	5	3:00
2016-10-08	Loss	(France) Fabio Pinca	Yokkao 19	Bolton, England	Decision (unanimous)	5	3:00
2016-07-17	Win	(Italy) Mauro Serra	Hearts on Fire	Italy	TKO (left hook)	5	3:00
Won Kombat League world Title.
2016-03-19	Win	(Japan) Tetsuya Yamato	Yokkao 17	Bolton, England	Decision	5	3:00
For the vacant title of Yokkao World 65 kg Title.
2015-10-10	Loss	(Thailand) Singdam Kiatmoo9	Yokkao 15	Bolton, England	Decision	5	3:00
2015-7-31	Win	(Thailand) Malaipet Sasiprapa	Lion Fight 23	Los Angeles, United States	Decision (split)	5	3:00
2015-03-21	Loss	(Thailand) Pakorn PKSaenchaimuaythaigym	Yokkao 13	Bolton, England	Unanimous decision	5	3:00
The fight was for Yokkao 65 kg Title.
2014-09-09	Win	(France) Mehdi Zatout	Smash 10	Liverpool, England	Decision	5	3:00
Wins the WBC Thai World Title (66kg).
2014-03-08	Win	(France) Houcine Bennoui	Yokkao 8	Bolton, England	Decision	5	3:00
2013-11-02	Win	(France) Dylan Salvador	The Main Event 2013	Manchester, England	Decision (unanimous)	5	3:00
2013-08-10	Loss	(Thailand) Sagetdao Petpayathai	MAX Muay Thai 3, Semi-finals	Zhengzhou, China	Decision	3	3:00
2013-05-03	Loss	(Japan) Masaaki Noiri	Glory 8: Tokyo – 65 kg Slam Tournament, Quarter-finals	Tokyo, Japan	TKO (cut)	2	
2013-03-23	Loss	(Morocco) Mosab Amrani	Glory 5: London	London, England	KO (left hook to the body)	1	1:20
2012-12-09	Loss	(Thailand) Saenchai PKSaenchaimuaythaigym	Muay Thai Warriors	Macau	Decision (unanimous)	5	3:00
For the Muay Thai Warriors Welterweight (65kg) title.
2012-03-31	Win	(Belarus) Andrei Kulebin	The Main Event	Manchester, England	TKO (leg kicks)	3	1:00
2011-10-08	Loss	(Morocco) Mohamed Khamal	Muaythai Premier League: Round 2	Padua, Italy	Decision (split)	5	3:00
2011-07-23	Win	(United States) Justin Greskiewicz	Warriors Cup XII	Lincroft, New Jersey	TKO (referee stop)	2	3:00
2011-04-09	Loss	(Thailand) Saenchai Sor Kingstar	Fight Sport Industries	Doncaster, England, UK	Decision	5	3:00
2011-02-19	Loss	(Thailand) Phetasawin Seatranferry	Super Showdown II	Glasgow, Scotland, UK	Decision	5	3:00
2010-10-25	Win	(Japan) Soichiro Miyakoshi	THAI FIGHT – Final 8	Bangkok, Thailand	KO (elbow)	3	
Despite victory Liam was disqualified from THAI FIGHT event due to coming in over the maximum weight of 67 kg. Miyakoshi would take his place in the semi-finals.
2010-08-29	Win	(Iran) Behzad Rafigh Doust	THAI FIGHT – Final 16	Bangkok, Thailand	TKO (low kicks and punches)	2	
2010-05-24	Loss	(Thailand) Petaswin Seatranferry	Patong Stadium	Phuket, Thailand	Decision	5	3:00
2010-03-27	Win	(Thailand) Anuwat Kaewsamrit	MSA Muaythai Premier League	Manchester, England, UK	Decision (unanimous)	5	3:00
2009-11-07	Loss	(Thailand) Sagetdao Petpayathai	MSA Muaythai Premier League	Bolton, England, UK	Decision	5	3:00
2009-09-12	Win	(Netherlands) Buray Bozaryilmaz	For The Glory Of	Liverpool, England, UK	TKO (ref stop)	2	
2009-06-26	Loss	(Thailand) Anuwat Kaewsamrit	Champions of Champions 2	Montego Bay, Jamaica	TKO (right low kicks)	3	0:35
Loses W.M.C. Muaythai lightweight world title −61.5 kg.
2009-05-30	Win	(Thailand) Jedeechai Sor Khamsing	Lumpinee Stadium	Bangkok, Thailand	TKO (leg kicks)	3	
2009-02-07	Loss	(Thailand) Saenchai Sor Kingstar	Muay Thai Legends	London, England, UK	Decision	5	3:00
2008-10-18	Win	(Japan) Masaru Ito	I.S.K.A. World Championship Kickboxing, Super Fight	Leeds, England, UK	Decision (unanimous)	5	3:00
2008-06-14	Win	(Thailand) Sarmsamut Kiatchongkao	World Championship Thai-Boxing	Leeds, England, UK	TKO (cut)	4	
Retains W.M.C. Muaythai lightweight world title −61.5 kg (1st title defense).
2008-04-19	Win	(France) Benabdeljelil Mehdi	Bad Company Show	Leeds, England, UK	TKO (body shot)	3	
2007-11-25	Win	(Thailand) Numphon PK Sterio	MSA Muaythai Premier League	Manchester, England, UK	KO (left hook)	4	
Wins Numphon's W.M.C. Muaythai lightweight world title −61.5 kg.
2007-10-28	Win	(Thailand) Sornkom Jocky Gym	Power of Scotland 3	Glasgow, Scotland, UK	TKO (cut by elbow)	2	
2007-09-22	Win	(Tunisia) Ahmed Saadi	W.P.M.F. Promotion, Lumpinee Stadium	Bangkok, Thailand	KO (left hook)	2	
Retains W.P.M.F. Muaythai world title −63.5 kg (2nd title defense).
2007-08-23 (approx)	Win	(Cambodia) Chey Kosal	Pro-Boxing	Cambodia	Decision	6	3:00
2007-06-23	Loss	(Thailand) Numphon PK Sterio	Bad Company/ShowSport International: Thai-Boxing	Leeds, England, UK	Decision	5	3:00
Fight was for W.M.C. Muaythai lightweight world title −61.5 kg.
2007-08-18	Win	(Thailand) Thanonsak Muangseema	Rajadamnern Stadium	Bangkok, Thailand	KO (low kicks)	3	
2007-04-08	Loss	(Thailand) Gupi Wor Suthira	Rajadamnern Stadium	Bangkok, Thailand	Decision	5	3:00
2007-03-16	Win	(Iran) Masood Patongmuaythai	W.P.M.F. Promotion	Ayutthaya, Thailand	KO (right punch)	4	
Retains W.P.M.F. Muaythai world title −63.5 kg (1st title defense).
2007-02-18	Win	(Thailand) Rungsiam	Master Sken's Show	Manchester, England, UK	Decision	5	3:00
2006-11-25	Loss	(Thailand) Petchaek Sor Suwanphakdee	Muay Thai Superfights	Wolverhampton Civic Hall	Decision	5	3:00
2006-08-06	Win	(Thailand) Rungrit Noi	Rajadamnern Stadium	Bangkok, Thailand	Decision	5	3:00
2006-07-17	Win	(Denmark) Ronnie Neergard	Patong Stadium	Phuket, Thailand	TKO (low kicks)	3	
Retains Patong Stadium Muaythai super welterweight title −68 kg.
2006-06-17	Win	(France) Mickael Lallemand	Bad Company Show	Leeds, England, UK	TKO (leg kick)	2	
2006-03-30	Loss	(Thailand) Witthayanoi Sitkuanem	Rajadamnern Stadium	Bangkok, Thailand	Decision	5	3:00
2006-02-26	Win	(Thailand) Jaroensap Kiatbanchong	Patong Stadium	Phuket, Thailand	TKO (ref stop)	2	3:00
2006-02-10	Win	(Japan) Masamitsu Hirashima	W.P.M.F. Promotion	Chainat Province, Thailand	Decision (unanimous)	5	3:00
Wins Hirashima's W.P.M.F. Muaythai world title −63.5 kg.
2006-01-23	Win	(Thailand) Klaynoi Sit Bankrajen	Phetbanchan Stadium	Koh Samui, Thailand	KO (right punch)	2	
2005-12-22	Win	(United Arab Emirates) Dzhabar Askerov	Patong Stadium	Phuket, Thailand	DQ (kick on floor)	4	
Wins Patong Stadium Muaythai super welterweight title −68 kg.
2005-11-20	Loss	(Thailand) Duwao Kongudom	Muay Thai Superfights	Wolverhampton, England, UK	Decision	5	3:00
2005-08-21	Loss	(Thailand) Witthayanoi Sitkuanem	Rajadamnern Stadium	Bangkok, Thailand	Decision (split)	5	3:00
2005-07-24	Win	(Japan) Hiromasa Masuda	Japan v World	Tokyo, Japan	KO (left hook)	3	2:55
2005-06-26	Win	(France) Benzouaoua Hakim	Bad Company Show	Leeds, England, UK	Decision	5	3:00
2005-04-23	Win	(France) Abdoulaye M'baye	Pain & Glory '05	Birmingham, England, UK	Decision (unanimous)	5	3:00
2005-02-27	Win	(Morocco) Mohamed Ajuou	Master Sken's Combat Fight Night	Manchester, England, UK	KO (left + right hook)	3	
Wins S.I.M.T.A. Muaythai lightweight European title −61.5 kg.
2004-12-03	Win	(Italy) Emannuel Di Profetis	W.A.K.O. Pro World Cup of Kickboxing	Naples, Italy	TKO (leg kicks)	4	
Wins vacant W.A.K.O. Pro low-kick kickboxing world title −62 kg.
2004-10-10	Win	(Morocco) Ait Said Aberderahman	Team Bad Company vs Team Dekkers	Leeds, England, UK	TKO (ref stop/3 knockdowns)	2	
2004-08-22	Win	(Japan) Satoruvashicoba	A.J.K.F. Event	Tokyo, Japan	Decision	5	3:00
2004-06-24	Win	(Russia) Aliaksandr Klitsen	England vs Russia	Liverpool, England, UK	Decision	5	3:00
2004-04-24	Win	(England) Matthew Johnson	Pain & Glory '04	Birmingham, England, UK	Decision	5	3:00
2004-02-29	Win	(Thailand) Preechapon Por Nuongubon	Master Sken's Show	Manchester, England, UK	Decision	5	3:00
2003-09-27	Win	(Thailand) Sayan Keatud	Master Sken's Show: England vs Thailand	Manchester, England, UK	TKO (low kicks)	4	
2003-07-20	Win	(Japan) Hiromasa Masuda	A.J.K.F. Kickout	Tokyo, Japan	KO (right hook)	3	2:55
2003-06-22	Win	(Thailand) Kiawsot Sitchujaroen	Ali Jacko Show: England vs Thailand	London, England, UK	TKO	5	
2003-03-23	Win	(England) Yogendra Parekh	K-Star Show	Birmingham, England, UK	Decision	5	3:00
2002-12-01	Win	(England) Daniel Welch	Dean White Show	Wakefield, England, UK	TKO	3	
2002-04-28	Win	(Netherlands) Abdullah Monadie	Bad Company: World Championship Thai-Boxing, Super Fight	Leeds, England, UK	TKO (low kicks)	2	
2001-09-29	Draw	(England) Reece Crooke	Bad Company Fight Night	Leeds, England, UK	Decision draw	5	3:00
2001-07-15	Win	(England) Glen Cashmore	Dean White Show	Wakefield, England, UK	Decision	5	3:00
2001-04-07	Win	(England) Yousef Abubacar	Bad Company Fight Night	Leeds, England, UK	TKO (gave up)	1	
2000-00-00	Win	(England) Abdul Arif	Master Sken's	England, UK	KO	1	
Wins S.I.M.T.A. Muaythai super featherweight Northern Area title −52 kg.
2000-09-08	Win	(England) Martin Shivnan	Master Sken's	England, UK	KO	1	
Legend: Win Loss Draw/no contest Notes

== See also ==
- List of male kickboxers
