= Buffalo Girls (disambiguation) =

Buffalo Girls is a 1990 novel by Larry McMurtry.

Buffalo Girls or Buffalo Gals may also refer to:

- Buffalo Gals, an 1844 American song
- "Buffalo Gals" (Malcolm McLaren song), a 1982 hip-hop single
- "Buffalo Gals" (Cow and Chicken), a 1998 television episode
- Buffalo Girls (miniseries), an adaptation of the novel
- Buffalo Girls (film), a 2012 Muay Thai boxing documetary
