= Denice Zamboanga =

Filipino mixed martial artist (born 1997)

- Born: January 14, 1997 (age 29); Quezon City, Philippines
- Other names: The Menace
- Height: 5 ft 2 in (1.57 m)
- Weight: 115 lb (52 kg; 8.2 st)
- Division: Strawweight (2017-2019); Atomweight (2019–present)
- Reach: 65.7 in (167 cm)
- Style: Karate; taekwondo; wrestling
- Fighting out of: Quezon City, Philippines
- Rank: Brown belt in Karate; Blue belt in Brazilian Jiu-Jitsu
- Years active: 2017-present

Mixed martial arts record
- Total: 14
- Wins: 12
- By knockout: 3
- By submission: 3
- By decision: 6
- Losses: 2
- By decision: 2

Other information
- Mixed martial arts record from Sherdog

Denice Zamboanga (born January 14, 1997) is a Filipino mixed martial artist. She is currently signed to ONE Championship, where she is a former ONE Women's Atomweight MMA World Champion.

== Background ==
Zamboanga was born and raised in Quezon City, Philippines, and her older brother, Drex, taught her and her three sisters the art of self-defense.

== Mixed martial arts career ==
=== Early career ===
Zamboanga made her professional MMA debut on January 6, 2017, winning the bout knockout in 44 seconds. She went on to win three more bouts prior to being signed by ONE Championship.

=== ONE Championship ===
Zamboanga signed with ONE Championship in 2019 as an undefeated MMA fighter. She managed to maintain her perfect record by defeated her first three opponents in the Singapore based martial arts organization from 2019 to 2020.

On December 6, 2019, Zamboanga made her ONE debut at ONE Championship: Mark Of Greatness, where she faced Jihin Radzuan. She won the bout by unanimous decision.

Zamboanga faced Mei Yamaguchi at ONE Championship: King of the Jungle on February 28, 2020. She won the bout by unanimous decision.

Zamboanga faced Watsapinya Kaewkhong at ONE Championship: A New Breed on August 28, 2020. She won the bout by submission.

==== ONE Women's Atomweight World Grand Prix ====
Zamboanga was one of the eight fighters selected to compete in the inaugural ONE Women's Atomweight Grand Prix. She faced Seo Hee Ham in the Grand Prix quarter-finals at ONE: Empower on September 3, 2021. She lost the bout via controversial split decision.

Zamboanga was scheduled to rematch Seo Hee Ham at ONE: X on December 5, 2021. However, the event was postponed on March 6, 2022, due to COVID-19 pandemic. She lost the fight by unanimous decision.

==== Post-Grand Prix ====
Zamboanga faced Lin Heqin on December 3, 2022, at ONE on Prime Video 5. She won the bout by split decision.

Zamboanga faced Julie Mezabarba on April 22, 2023, at ONE Fight Night 9. She won the bout via unanimous decision. On June 16, 2023, it was announced that Mezabarba had tested positive for a banned substance in an in-competition drug test and she was suspended for 18 months, but she had already been released from the promotion.

Zamboanga was scheduled to face Stamp Fairtex for the ONE Women's Atomweight World Championship on March 1, 2024, at ONE 166. However, the bout was moved to June so the fighters can take part in the start of an original docuseries production. The bout was rescheduled on June 8, 2024, at ONE 167. However, on May 21, it was announced that Stamp was forced to withdraw due to serious knee injury. Zamboanga faced Noelle Grandjean instead. She won the fight by unanimous decision.

==== ONE Women's Atomweight Champion ====
Zamboanga was scheduled to face Alyona Rassohyna for the interim ONE Women's Atomweight World Championship on October 5, 2024, at ONE Fight Night 25. However, in August 2024, it was announced that Zamboanga had withdrawn from the bout due to a hamstring injury. The bout was rescheduled on January 11, 2025, at ONE Fight Night 27. She won the fight via technical knockout in round two to win the interim title. This win also earned her the $50,000 Performance of the Night bonus.

Zamboanga was scheduled to face atomweight champion Stamp Fartex at ONE 173 on August 1, 2025. However, it was announced in May 2025 that Stamp withdrew due to a setback in her recovery from knee surgery. As a result, Stamp agreed to relinquish her atomweight MMA title and Zamboanga was subsequently promoted to undisputed champion. Zamboanga was then scheduled to face Ayaka Miura on November 16, 2025. However, she withdrew from the bout due to a medical issue. She later revealed she was pregnant and vacated the atomweight MMA title on June 23, 2026, following the birth of her first child.

== Personal life ==
Zamboanga is married to fellow MMA fighter Fritz Biagtan. She announced the birth of their first child on June 23, 2026.

== Championships and accomplishments ==
- ONE Championship
  - ONE Women's Atomweight World Champion (one time)
  - Performance of the Night (One time) (vs. Alyona Rassohyna)

== Mixed martial arts record ==
Professional record breakdown
14 matches	12 wins	2 losses
By knockout	3	0
By submission	3	0
By decision	6	2

Res.	Record	Opponent	Method	Event	Date	Round	Time	Location	Notes
Win	12–2	Alyona Rassohyna	TKO (elbows and punches)	ONE Fight Night 27	January 11, 2025	2	4:47	Bangkok, Thailand	Won the interim ONE Women's Atomweight Championship (115 lb). Later promoted to undisputed champion. Later vacated title due to childbirth.
Win	11–2	Noelle Grandjean	Decision (unanimous)	ONE 167	June 8, 2024	3	5:00	Bangkok, Thailand	
Win	10–2	Julie Mezabarba	Decision (unanimous)	ONE Fight Night 9	April 22, 2023	3	5:00	Bangkok, Thailand	Mezabarba tested positive for a banned substance.
Win	9–2	Lin Heqin	Decision (split)	ONE on Prime Video 5	December 3, 2022	3	5:00	Pasay, Philippines	
Loss	8–2	Ham Seo-hee	Decision (unanimous)	ONE: X	March 26, 2022	3	5:00	Kallang, Singapore	
Loss	8–1	Ham Seo-hee	Decision (split)	ONE: Empower	September 3, 2021	3	5:00	Kallang, Singapore	ONE Women's Atomweight World Grand Prix Quarterfinal.
Win	8–0	Watsapinya Kaewkhong	Submission (keylock)	ONE: A New Breed	August 28, 2020	1	3:33	Bangkok, Thailand	
Win	7–0	Mei Yamaguchi	Decision (unanimous)	ONE: King of the Jungle	February 28, 2020	3	5:00	Kallang, Singapore	
Win	6–0	Jihin Radzuan	Decision (unanimous)	ONE: Mark of Greatness	December 6, 2019	3	5:00	Kuala Lumpur, Malaysia	
Win	5–0	Cho Eun-bi	TKO (punches)	URCC: Colossal	September 29, 2018	2	N/A	Quezon City, Philippines	
Win	4–0	Kim Hye-sun	Submission (armbar)	URCC: Bets 5	March 23, 2018	2	N/A	Manila, Philippines	Return to Strawweight.
Win	3–0	Yang Seo-woo	Submission (rear-naked choke)	Gleamon FC 2	January 20, 2018	1	3:09	Seoul, South Korea	Atomweight debut.
Win	2–0	Coline Biron	Decision (unanimous)	Southeast Asia FC 33	January 22, 2017	3	5:00	Manila, Philippines	
Win	1–0	Paj Nut	TKO (punches)	Southeast Asia FC 26	January 6, 2017	1	0:44	Manila, Philippines	Strawweight debut.

== See also ==
- List of current ONE fighters
- List of female mixed martial artists
