= ONE Fight Night 9 =

Combat sport event in 2023

ONE Fight Night 9: Nong-O vs. Haggerty
- The poster for ONE Fight Night 9: Nong-O vs. Haggerty
- Promotion: ONE Championship
- Date: April 21, 2023
- Venue: Lumpinee Boxing Stadium
- City: Bangkok, Thailand

Event chronology
ONE Friday Fights 13: Batman vs. Paidang	ONE Fight Night 9: Nong-O vs. Haggerty	ONE Friday Fights 14: Gingsanglek vs. Chorfah

ONE Fight Night 9: Nong-O vs. Haggerty was a combat sports event produced by ONE Championship that took place on April 22, 2023, at Lumpinee Boxing Stadium in Bangkok, Thailand.

== Background ==
A ONE Bantamweight Muay Thai World Championship bout between current champion Nong-O Gaiyanghadao and former ONE Flyweight Muay Thai World Champion Jonathan Haggerty headlined the event.

A strawweight bout between Bokang Masunyane and Hiroba Minowa took place at the event. The pairing was previously scheduled to meet at ONE 159, but the bout was scrapped due to Masunyane missed weight and Minowa rejecting a catchweight bout.

A bantamweight bout between Jhanlo Mark Sangiao and Matias Farinelli took place at the event. The pairing was previously scheduled to meet at ONE 164, but Farinelli has been removed from the card due to tested positive for COVID-19.

A bantamweight muay thai bout between Ferrari Fairtex and Felipe Lobo was scheduled for this event. However, due to Ferrari losing to Fabio Reis by knockout at ONE Friday Fights 4, he pulled out from the event and was replaced by Saemapetch Fairtex.

At weigh-ins, Han Zihao weighed in at 149.5 lbs, 4.5 lbs over the Bantamweight limit, and Asa Ten Pow, coming in at 145.25 lbs or .5 lbs over the limit, missed weight and their bout was renegotiated as a catchweight at 149.5 lbs. Matias Farinelli failed his hydration test and was forced to take a catchweight at 149.75 lbs.

== Results ==
Main Card (Amazon Prime Video)
Weight class				Method	Round	Time	Notes
Bantamweight Muay Thai	Jonathan Haggerty	def.	Nong-O Gaiyanghadao (c)	KO (punches)	1	2:40	(Note: For the ONE Bantamweight Muay Thai World Championship.)
Lightweight	Halil Amir	def.	Maurice Abévi	Decision (unanimous)	3	5:00
Strawweight	Bokang Masunyane	def.	Hiroba Minowa	Decision (unanimous)	3	5:00
Bantamweight Muay Thai	Felipe Lobo	def.	Saemapetch Fairtex	KO (punches)	3	1:56
Women's Atomweight	Denice Zamboanga	def.	Julie Mezabarba	Decision (unanimous)	3	5:00
Welterweight	Isi Fitikefu	def.	Valmir da Silva	Submission (rear-naked choke)	1	4:15
Women's Strawweight	Meng Bo	def.	Dayane Cardoso	Decision (unanimous)	3	5:00
Catchweight (149.5 lbs) Muay Thai	Asa Ten Pow	def.	Han Zihao	TKO (punches)	3	0:52
Catchweight (149.25 lbs)	Jhanlo Mark Sangiao	def.	Matias Farinelli	Submission (kneebar)	1	0:58

== Bonus awards ==
The following fighters were awarded bonuses.

- Performance of the Night ($100,000): Jonathan Haggerty
- Performance of the Night: Felipe Lobo, Isi Fitikefu and Jhanlo Mark Sangiao

== See also ==
- 2023 in ONE Championship
- List of ONE Championship events
- List of current ONE fighters
