= Alyona Rassohyna =

Ukrainian mixed martial arts fighter

- Born: Алена Рассохина; June 11, 1990 (age 36); Dnipro, Ukrainian SSR, Soviet Union
- Nationality: Ukrainian
- Height: 157 cm (5 ft 2 in)
- Weight: 52 kg (115 lb; 8 st 3 lb)
- Division: Atomweight; Strawweight
- Fighting out of: Dnipro, Ukraine
- Team: Yarost Gym
- Years active: 2010 - present

Mixed martial arts record
- Total: 19
- Wins: 13
- By submission: 11
- By decision: 2
- Losses: 6
- By knockout: 1
- By submission: 2
- By decision: 3

Other information
- Mixed martial arts record from Sherdog

Alyona Rassohyna (born June 11, 1990) is a Ukrainian female mixed martial artist who competed in the Atomweight and Strawweight divisions of the ONE Championship. From October 2020 till December 2020, she was ranked #9 Female Atomweight by Fight Matrix

== Background ==
Alyona started MMA at the insistence of her father after she was bullied at school and dad decided that the girl should learn to defend herself. Alyona is a head coach for Club "Rage" in Dnipro, along with her husband Alexey Fedonov. In 2020, she appeared on "Supermama", a Ukrainian psychological family reality, where parents are rated on how good of parents they are.

== Mixed martial arts career ==
=== Early career ===
Starting her career in 2010, Alyona fought most of her early career in the regional Ukrainian scene, most for the promotion Oplot Challenge, compiling a 10–2 record. In 2014, she faced Invicta FC vet Katja Kankaanpää at Lappeenranta Fight Night 10 on May 17, 2014, and UFC and Rizin FF vet Seo Hee Ham in Alyona's atomweight debut at Road FC 018 on August 30, 2014. She lost her fight against Katja via second round armbar and her fight against Ham via unanimous decision.

After her loss to Seo Hee Ham, Alyona took time off from her fighting career due to the birth of her daughter.

Competing with World Warriors Fighting Championship, Alyona won both her bouts for the promotion, against Samantha Jean-Francois and Elaine Leal, the former being for the WWFC Atomweight Championship.

=== ONE Championship ===
In her ONE debut, Rassohyna faced Stamp Fairtex at ONE Championship: Unbreakable 3 on January 22, 2021. Despite being dominating the majority of the fight, Alyona won via submission in the closing seconds, giving Stamp her first loss in MMA competition.

==== ONE Women's Atomweight World Grand Prix ====
Rassohyna faced Stamp Fairtex in a rematch as the quarterfinal bout of ONE Championship 2021 Atomweight GP at ONE Championship: Empower on May 28, 2021. However, the event was postponed due to COVID-19. The event was rescheduled for September 3, 2021. She lost the bout via split decision.

After a three-years hiatus, Rassohyna was scheduled to face Denice Zamboanga for the interim ONE Women's Atomweight World Championship on October 5, 2024, at ONE Fight Night 25. However in August 2024, it was announced that Zamboanga had withdrawn from the bout due to a hamstring injury. The bout was rescheduled on January 11, 2025, at ONE Fight Night 27. She lost the fight via technical knockout in round two.

== Championships and accomplishments ==
- World Warriors Fighting Championship
  - WWFC Atomweight Champion (one time)

== Mixed martial arts record ==
Professional record breakdown
18 matches	13 wins	5 losses
By knockout	0	1
By submission	11	2
By decision	2	2

Res.	Record	Opponent	Method	Event	Date	Round	Time	Location	Notes
Loss	13–6	Denice Zamboanga	TKO (elbows and punches)	ONE Fight Night 27	January 11, 2025	2	4:47	Bangkok, Thailand	For the interim ONE Women's Atomweight Championship (115 lb).
Loss	13–5	Stamp Fairtex	Decision (split)	ONE: Empower	September 3, 2021	3	5:00	Kallang, Singapore	ONE Women's Atomweight World Grand Prix Quarterfinal.
Win	13–4	Stamp Fairtex	Submission (guillotine choke)	ONE: Unbreakable 3	January 22, 2021	3	4:53	Kallang, Singapore	Return to Strawweight.
Win	12–4	Elaine Leal	Submission (armbar)	World Warriors FC 15	September 21, 2019	1	1:02	Kyiv, Ukraine	Won the vacant WWFC Atomweight Championship.
Win	11–4	Samantha Jean-Francois	Submission (armbar)	World Warriors FC 11	June 16, 2018	1	4:25	Kyiv, Ukraine	
Loss	10–4	Ham Seo-hee	Decision (unanimous)	Road FC 018	August 30, 2014	2	5:00	Seoul, South Korea	Atomweight debut.
Loss	10–3	Katja Kankaanpää	Submission (armbar)	Lappeenranta Fight Night 10	May 17, 2014	2	0:49	Lappeenranta, Finland	Strawweight bout.
Win	10–2	Lyudmyla Pylypchak	Submission (armbar)	Oplot Challenge 87	November 9, 2013	1	2:33	Kharkov, Ukraine	
Win	9–2	Yana Kuzioma	Submission (armbar)	ECSF: Battle on the Dnieper 2	August 31, 2013	1	1:21	Dniprodzerzhynsk, Ukraine	Return to Flyweight.
Win	8–2	Alisa Alimova	Submission (armbar)	Oplot Challenge 69	June 22, 2013	1	2:20	Kharkov, Ukraine	Bantamweight debut.
Win	7–2	Anastasiya Rybalochko	Submission (armbar)	Oplot Challenge 37	February 23, 2013	1	2:28	Kharkov, Ukraine	
Win	6–2	Marina Logvina	Submission (armbar)	Oplot Challenge 16	December 1, 2012	1	4:15	Kharkiv, Ukraine	
Loss	5–2	Anna Bezhenar	Submission (armbar)	Oplot Challenge 4	September 15, 2012	1	4:30	Kharkiv, Ukraine	
Win	5–1	Ekaterina Muhortikova	Submission (armbar)	IKF: World MMA Federation	June 8, 2012	1	3:02	Tallinn, Estonia	
Win	4–1	Anna Moldavchuk	Submission (armbar)	Oplot Challenge 2	May 13, 2012	1	1:16	Kharkiv, Ukraine	
Win	3–1	Risalat Mingbatyrova	Submission (armbar)	Oplot Challenge 1	March 25, 2012	1	3:53	Kharkiv, Ukraine	
Win	2–1	Milena Koleva	Decision (unanimous)	FDI Real Kech: Battle of Sofia	September 17, 2011	3	5:00	Sofia, Bulgaria	
Loss	1–1	Risalat Mingbatyrova	Decision (unanimous)	ProFC: Union Nation Cup 15	May 6, 2011	2	5:00	Simferopol, Ukraine	Strawweight debut.
Win	1–0	Olga Denisenko	Decision (unanimous)	M-1 Ukraine: Battle of Champions	November 26, 2010	2	5:00	Simferopol, Ukraine	Flyweight debut.

== See also ==
- List of female mixed martial artists
