= Alyse Anderson =

American mixed martial artist

- Born: January 13, 1995 (age 31); Mason, Michigan, United States
- Other names: Lil' Savage
- Height: 5 ft 5 in (1.65 m)
- Weight: 115 lb (52 kg)
- Division: Atomweight; Strawweight
- Reach: 66 in (168 cm)
- Fighting out of: Michigan, United States
- Team: Scorpion Fighting System (until 2021); MMA Masters (2021–present); American Top Team
- Rank: Blue belt in Brazilian Jiu-Jitsu
- Years active: 2015–present

Mixed martial arts record
- Total: 10
- Wins: 6
- By knockout: 2
- By submission: 2
- By decision: 2
- Losses: 4
- By knockout: 1
- By decision: 3

Other information
- Mixed martial arts record from Sherdog

Alyse Anderson (born January 13, 1995) is an American mixed martial artist and competes in Atomweight division. She has competed in Invicta Fighting Championships and ONE Championship.

== Mixed martial arts career ==
=== Early career ===
Anderson started her amateur career in 2013. After amassing 6–0 record in 2015, She was signed by Total Warrior Combat. where she defeated Chrissie Daniels via TKO in the first round, Rachel Sazoff via unanimous decision and Tushara Veerella via TKO in round three.

=== Invicta Fighting Championships ===
Anderson made her promotional debut on August 31, 2017, at Invicta FC 25: Kunitskaya vs. Pa'aluhi against Shino VanHoose. She lost the fight via split decision.

Her next fight came 11 months later on July 21, 2018, at Invicta FC 30: Frey vs. Grusander against Stephanie Alba. She won the fight via a submission in round two.

On August 9, 2019, Simpson faced Katie Saull at Invicta FC 36: Sorenson vs. Young. She won the fight via split decision.

=== ONE Championship ===
In 2021, Anderson signed with ONE Championship, and was immediately placed in the Atomweight World Grand-Prix. The quarter final bout was initially scheduled take place on May 28, 2021, against Itsuki Hirata at ONE Championship: Empower. However, the event was postponed due to COVID-19. The event was rescheduled for September 3, 2021. She lost the bout via unanimous decision.

Anderson was expected to face Asha Roka at ONE: X on March 26, 2022. However, Anderson later withdrew from the bout for medical reasons. The fight was rescheduled for ONE 157 on May 20, 2022. Despite getting knocked down, Anderson was able to secure a triangle choke to secure a first-round submission victory.

Anderson faced Stamp Fairtex on May 5, 2023, at ONE Fight Night 10. She lost the fight by knockout via body kick in the second round.

Anderson faced Victória Souza on September 6, 2024, at ONE 168. She lost the fight via unanimous decision.

On September 9, 2025, it was announced that Anderson was released from ONE Championship.

== Personal life ==
Anderson is an emergency medical technician in Michigan hospital.

== Mixed martial arts record ==
Professional record breakdown
10 matches	6 wins	4 losses
By knockout	2	1
By submission	2	0
By decision	2	3

Res.	Record	Opponent	Method	Event	Date	Round	Time	Location	Notes
Loss	6–4	Victória Souza	Decision (unanimous)	ONE 168	September 6, 2024	3	5:00	Denver, Colorado, United States	
Loss	6–3	Stamp Fairtex	KO (body kick)	ONE Fight Night 10	May 5, 2023	2	2:27	Broomfield, Colorado, United States	
Win	6–2	Asha Roka	Submission (triangle choke)	ONE 157	May 20, 2022	1	2:04	Kallang, Singapore	
Loss	5–2	Itsuki Hirata	Decision (unanimous)	ONE: Empower	September 3, 2021	3	5:00	Kallang, Singapore	Return to Strawweight. ONE Women's Atomweight World Grand Prix Quarterfinal.
Win	5–1	Katie Saull	Decision (split)	Invicta FC 36: Sorenson vs. Young	July 9, 2019	3	5:00	Kansas City, Missouri, United States	
Win	4–1	Stephanie Alba	Technical Submission (triangle choke)	Invicta FC 30: Frey vs. Grusander	July 21, 2018	2	3:12	Kansas City, Missouri, United States	
Loss	3–1	Shino VanHoose	Decision (split)	Invicta FC 25: Kunitskaya vs. Pa'aluhi	August 31, 2017	3	5:00	Lemoore, California, United States	
Win	3–0	Tushara Veerella	TKO (punches)	TWC Pro Series: Anderson vs. Veerella	November 12, 2016	3	3:49	Lansing, Michigan, United States	Won the TWC Atomweight Championship.
Win	2–0	Rachel Sazoff	Decision (unanimous)	TWC 29	May 14, 2016	3	5:00	Lansing, Michigan, United States	Atomweight debut.
Win	1–0	Chrissie Daniels	TKO (knees and punches)	TWC 28	November 21, 2015	1	4:21	Lansing, Michigan, United States	Strawweight debut.

== See also ==
- List of female mixed martial artists
