= ONE 167 =

Combat sport events in 2024

ONE 167: Tawanchai vs. Nattawut 2
- The poster for ONE 167: Tawanchai vs. Nattawut 2
- Promotion: ONE Championship
- Date: June 8, 2024
- Venue: Impact Arena
- City: Bangkok, Thailand

Event chronology
ONE Friday Fights 66: Kongchai vs. Hamidi	ONE 167: Tawanchai vs. Nattawut 2	ONE Friday Fights 67: Nakrob vs. Khalilov

ONE 167: Tawanchai vs. Nattawut 2 was a combat sport event produced by ONE Championship that took place on June 8, 2024, at the Impact Arena in Bangkok, Thailand.

== Background ==
After the hosting events in Bangkok that took place in Lumpinee Boxing Stadium (hosted the ONE Friday Fights and ONE Fight Night), this event was 17th promotion hosted to Impact Arena and the first since ONE Fight Night 6 in January 2023.

A ONE Women's Atomweight World Championship bout between current champion (also ONE Women's Atomweight World Grand Prix winner, former ONE Women's Atomweight Muay Thai and Kickboxing World Champion) Stamp Fairtex and Denice Zamboanga was expected to headline the event. The bout was originally scheduled at ONE 166 on March 1, but the bout was moved to this event so the fighters can take part in the start of an original docuseries production. However on May 21, it was announced that Stamp was forced to withdraw due to serious knee injury. Zamboanga faced Noelle Grandjean instead.

A ONE Featherweight Muay Thai World Championship bout between current champion Tawanchai P.K.Saenchai and Jo Nattawut was expected to serve as the co-main event. Due to the originally main event was cancelled, the bout was promoted to main event instead. The pairing previously met at ONE Fight Night 15 in the Kickboxing match, which Tawanchai won by unanimous decision.

ONE Lightweight Submission Grappling Champion and 2022 ADCC World Champion Kade Ruotolo made his professional MMA debut against Blake Cooper, who his the brother of 2019 and 2021 PFL welterweight winner Ray Cooper III in a lightweight bout. Additionally, ONE Flyweight Submission Grappling World Champion Mikey Musumeci moved up to bantamweight, faced Gabriel Sousa in a submission grappling match.

At the weigh ins, Rodtang Jitmuangnon weighed in at 141.25 pounds, 6.25 pounds over the flyweight limit. The bout proceeded at catchweight and he was fined 25 percent of his purse which went to Denis Purić. The bout between Liam Harrison and Katsuni Kitano was removed from the card after both fighters missed weight.

== Results ==
Fight card (Amazon Prime Video)
Weight class				Method	Round	Time	Notes
Featherweight Muay Thai	Tawanchai P.K.Saenchai (c)	def.	Jo Nattawut	Decision (majority) (48–48, 48–47, 49–46)	5	3:00	(Note: For the ONE Featherweight Muay Thai World Championship.)
Flyweight Kickboxing	Rodtang Jitmuangnon	def.	Denis Purić	Decision (unanimous)	3	3:00	(Note: Rodtang missed weight (141.25 lb).)
Bantamweight Submission Grappling	Mikey Musumeci	def.	Gabriel Sousa	Submission (calf slicer)	1	3:07
Lightweight	Kade Ruotolo	def.	Blake Cooper	Submission (rear-naked choke)	1	3:20
Featherweight Kickboxing	Sitthichai Sitsongpeenong	def.	Masaaki Noiri	Decision (unanimous)	3	3:00
Women's Atomweight	Denice Zamboanga	def.	Noelle Grandjean	Decision (unanimous)	3	5:00
Lightweight	Adrian Lee	def.	Antonio Mammarella	Submission (rear-naked choke)	2	1:56
Flyweight Muay Thai	Nguyễn Trần Duy Nhất	def.	Johan Ghazali	Decision (unanimous)	3	3:00
Women's Atomweight	Victória Souza	def.	Itsuki Hirata	Technical Submission (guillotine choke)	1	1:31
Bantamweight Muay Thai	Johan Estupiñan	def.	Zafer Sayik	Decision (unanimous)	3	3:00

== Bonus awards ==
The following fighters received $50,000 bonuses.

- Performance of the Night: Mikey Musumeci, Kade Ruotolo and Adrian Lee

== See also ==
- 2024 in ONE Championship
- List of ONE Championship events
- List of current ONE fighters
- ONE Championship Rankings
