= Stamp Fairtex =

Thai martial artist (born 1997)

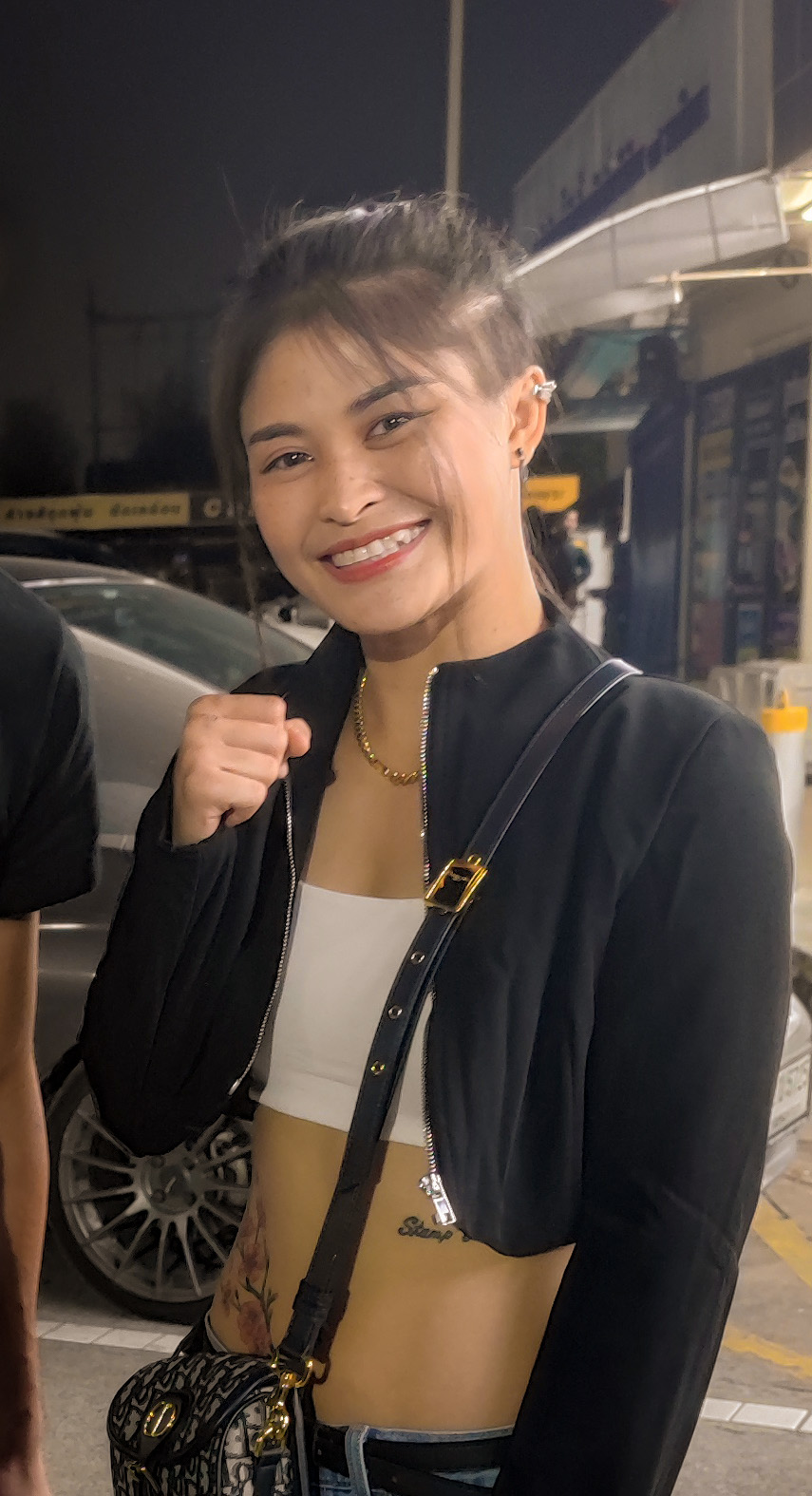
- Fairtex in 2023
- Born: Nadthawan Panthong; November 16, 1997 (age 28); Rayong, Thailand
- Native name: แสตมป์ แฟร์เท็กซ์
- Other names: Nong Stamp
- Height: 5 ft 2 in (1.57 m)
- Weight: 115 lb (52 kg)
- Division: Light flyweight Atomweight; Strawweight (Note: ONE Championship refers to their 115 lb division as Atomweight, but per the Association of Boxing Commissions in the United States, 115 lbs is considered Strawweight.)
- Reach: 63 in (160 cm)
- Style: Muay Thai, Brazilian Jiu-Jitsu
- Fighting out of: Pattaya, Thailand
- Team: Fairtex Training Center
- Trainer: Jason Burnworth; De'Alonzio Jackson; Klahan Temjai
- Rank: Purple belt in Brazilian Jiu-Jitsu under Jason Burnworth
- Years active: 2003–present (Muay Thai); 2018–present (MMA)

Kickboxing record
- Total: 88
- Wins: 65
- Losses: 18
- Draws: 5

Mixed martial arts record
- Total: 13
- Wins: 11
- By knockout: 5
- By submission: 2
- By decision: 4
- Losses: 2
- By submission: 2

Other information
- Mixed martial arts record from Sherdog

Nadthawan Panthong (Thai: ณัฐวรรณ พานทอง, born November 16, 1997), known professionally as Stamp Fairtex (Thai: แสตมป์ แฟร์เท็กซ์), is a Thai professional mixed martial artist, Muay Thai fighter, and kickboxer. She is currently signed to ONE Championship, where she is the former ONE Women's Atomweight MMA World Champion. She is the organization's first three-sport world champion, having also held the ONE Atomweight Muay Thai World Championship and ONE Atomweight Kickboxing World Championship. As of September 22, 2026, Fairtex is ranked #3 in the ONE Women's Atomweight Muay Thai rankings.

Initially competing in the all-striking ONE Super Series, Stamp made her mixed martial arts (MMA) debut on October 11, 2018. She won the 2021 ONE Women's MMA Atomweight World Grand Prix.

Her ring name is inspired by the Fairtex Gym in Pattaya where she trained from age 18.

== Background ==
Stamp's father is a former Muay Thai fighter who competed under the name Wisanlek Lukbangplasoy. Stamp started practicing Muay Thai at the age of 5 in order to avoid bullying in school, with her father training her. A year later, she would win her first fight by KO via knees. She became a Muay Thai champion of a local stadium and a two-division Eastern Thailand champion. These early years of Stamp's career were featured in the 2012 documentary, Buffalo Girls. Going into her teenage years, Stamp took eight years off of Muay Thai due to being unable to find suitable opponents in her hometown region, in addition to there being a lack of women's Muay Thai fights being held at the time.

At 18, she moved to the Fairtex Gym in Pattaya, where she would also begin training in Brazilian jiu-jitsu. Stamp has won a gold medal at the 2019 Siam Cup BJJ tournament in the women's gi 58.5 kg class.

== Muay Thai and kickboxing career ==
In her ONE Championship debut at ONE Championship: Kingdom of Heroes on October 6, 2018, she challenged Kai Ting Chuang for the ONE Atomweight Kickboxing World Championship. Stamp would win by unanimous decision, claiming her first ONE world title.

She was next scheduled to face Janet Todd for the inaugural ONE Atomweight Muay Thai World Championship at ONE Championship: Call to Greatness on February 22, 2019. Stamp won the fight by unanimous decision to claim the ONE Atomweight Muay Thai World Championship and become ONE Championship's first two-sport world champion.

Stamp Fairtex would defend her ONE Atomweight Muay Thai World Championship against Alma Juniku at ONE Championship: Legendary Quest on June 15, 2019. She retained her title by a unanimous decision victory.

After three straight mixed martial arts matches, Stamp would face Janet Todd for the second time to defend the ONE Atomweight Kickboxing World Championship at ONE Championship: King of the Jungle on February 28, 2020. Stamp lost the title to Todd via a closely contested split decision, marking her first-ever loss in ONE Championship.

Stamp Fairtex was then scheduled to defend her Atomweight Muay Thai belt for the second time during ONE Championship: A New Breed on August 28, 2020, with her opponent being the Queens of the Ring Flyweight Tournament winner Allycia Rodrigues. After five rounds, Stamp lost the title to Rodrigues by majority decision.

On January 11, 2023, it was announced that Stamp would face Anissa Meksen for the interim ONE Women's Atomweight Kickboxing World Championship. The fight was cancelled after Meksen voiced her displeasure with how she was treated by the promotion.

Stamp Fairtex will face Kana Morimoto at ONE 173 on November 16, 2025.

== Mixed martial arts career ==
=== ONE Championship ===
==== ONE Warrior Series and early fights ====
After being scouted by Rich Franklin, Stamp made her mixed martial arts debut on ONE Warrior Series 2 on July 19, 2018. She knocked out Rashi Shinde with a head kick in just 19 seconds of the first round. The victory earned her a contract with ONE Championship.

In 2019, Stamp announced her intentions to continue to compete in mixed martial arts in ONE Championship, with the goal of becoming a ONE World Champion in MMA as well. She made her ONE Championship promotional MMA debut against Asha Roka at ONE Championship: Dreams of Gold on August 16, 2019. Stamp won by submission at 1:29 of the third round via rear naked choke. Following the submission victory, she was given her blue belt in Brazilian jiu-jitsu by De'Alonzio Jackson.

Stamp was next expected to face Bi Nguyen at ONE Championship: Masters of Fate on November 8, 2019. After dominating all three rounds with her Muay Thai-based striking, she won by unanimous decision.

Stamp next faced Puja Tomar at ONE Championship: A New Tomorrow on January 10, 2020. Stamp defeated Tomar by TKO at 4:27 of the first round via ground and pound.

Leading up to her fight with Tomar, Stamp voiced interest in facing Mei Yamaguchi, who she said possessed high-class wrestling skills, to test her own level. She said she hoped a fight with Yamaguchi would help solidify her all-round MMA skills before she potentially challenging for a ONE World Title. "My stand-up game is really good. It is strong, but my ground game still needs a lot of work," Stamp said, "I need to improve my ground game and get stronger because (reigning ONE Women’s Atomweight World Champion) Angela Lee is good all-around."

Stamp next faced Sunisa Srisen at ONE Championship: No Surrender on July 31, 2020. She extended her winning streak to five with a first-round TKO of Srisen.

She then faced Alyona Rassohyna at ONE Championship: Unbreakable 3 on January 22, 2021. Despite dominating the majority of the fight, Stamp lost by submission via a last-effort guillotine choke in the closing seconds, earning her first loss in MMA competition. While there was initially some controversy surrounding the fight, with Stamp arguing she did not tap, media outlets generally agreed that she did tap out.

==== 2021 ONE Women's Atomweight Grand Prix ====
Stamp faced Alyona Rassohyna in a rematch as the quarterfinal bout of ONE Women's Atomweight Grand Prix at ONE Championship: Empower on May 28, 2021. However, the event was postponed due to COVID-19. The event was rescheduled for September 3, 2021. She avenged her loss, winning the bout via split decision.

Stamp was scheduled to face Seo Hee Ham in the semi-final bout of ONE Women's Atomweight Grand Prix at ONE Championship: NextGen on October 29, 2021. Ham later withdrew from the bout after suffering an injury in training, and was replaced by Julie Mezabarba. Stamp won the fight by unanimous decision.

Stamp faced Ritu Phogat in the ONE Women's Atomweight Grand Prix Final at ONE: Winter Warriors on December 3, 2021. She defeated Phogat by submission via armbar in the second round to win the 2021 ONE Women's Atomweight World Grand Prix Championship.

==== Post-Atomweight Grand Prix fights ====
Stamp faced Angela Lee for the ONE Women's Atomweight Championship at ONE: X on March 26, 2022. Even though she hurt Lee with a liver punch in the first round, she lost the bout by submission via rear-naked choke in the second round.

Stamp faced Jihin Radzuan at ONE on Prime Video 2 on October 1, 2022. At the weigh-ins, Radzuan weighed in at 120.25 pounds, 5.25 lbs over the atomweight non-title fight limit. Radzuan was fined 30% of their purse, which went to their opponent Stamp. Stamp won the fight by unanimous decision.

Before Stamp faced Radzuan, it was announced that Anissa Meksen will fight Stamp in a Mixed Rules-bout at ONE on Prime Video 6 on January 14, 2023, at the Impact, Muang Thong Thani in Bangkok. After she won, Fairtex responded to being called a 'dancer' by Meksen, stating that Meksen has never won a ONE Championship-belt, as Fairtex actually held both the ONE Atomweight Muay Thai and Kickboxing title simultaneously. The fight was cancelled on the day of weigh-ins, as Meksen failed to appear. Stamp was rescheduled to face Anna Jaroonsak in a strawweight kickboxing bout at the same event. Stamp won the fight by split decision and was awarded a $50,000 bonus afterwards.

Stamp faced Alyse Anderson on May 5, 2023, at ONE Fight Night 10. Stamp won the fight by knockout via body kick in the second round. She was awarded a $50,000 bonus afterwards.

==== ONE Women's Atomweight Champion ====
Stamp faced Seo Hee Ham at ONE Fight Night 14 on September 29, 2023. The bout was originally scheduled to be for the interim ONE Women's Atomweight title, however after reigning champion Angela Lee announced her retirement during the event, the fight became for the vacant undisputed title. Stamp defeated Ham by third-round technical knockout to become the new ONE Women's Atomweight World Champion, becoming ONE's first-ever three-sport world champion.

In her first title defence, Stamp was scheduled to face former teammate Denice Zamboanga on March 1, 2024, at ONE 166. However, the bout was moved to June so the fighters can take part in the start of an original docuseries production. The bout was rescheduled on June 8, 2024, at ONE 167. However, on May 21, it was announced that Fairtex pulled out of the bout due to injury.

Stamp was scheduled face Xiong Jing Nan for the ONE Women's Strawweight World Championship on September 6, 2024, at ONE 168. However, due to injury she was forced to withdraw.

Following the rehab of her knee, Stamp was scheduled to face interim champion Denice Zamboanga at ONE 173 on August 1, 2025. However, it was announced in May 2025 that Stamp withdrew due to a setback in her recovery from knee surgery. As a result, Stamp agreed to relinquish her atomweight MMA title and Zamboanga was subsequently be promoted to undisputed champion.

== Titles and accomplishments ==
=== Brazilian jiu-jitsu ===
- Siam Cup BJJ
  - (gold) 2019 Siam Cup BJJ Women's Gi 58.5 kg - 1st place

=== Kickboxing ===
- ONE Championship
  - ONE Women's Atomweight Kickboxing World Champion (one time; former)
  - Performance of the Night (One time) vs. Anna Jaroonsak

=== Mixed martial arts ===
- ONE Championship
  - ONE Women's Atomweight World Champion (one time)
  - Performance of the Night (Two times) vs. Seo Hee Ham and Alyse Anderson
  - 2021 ONE Women's Atomweight World Grand Prix Champion
  - MMA Female Fighter of the Year 2021
  - 2022 MMA Fight of the Year (vs. Angela Lee at ONE: X)

=== Muay Thai ===
- ONE Championship
  - ONE Women's Atomweight Muay Thai World Champion (one time; former)
    - One successful title defense
- Thepprasit Stadium
  - Thepprasit Stadium Light Flyweight (108 lbs) Champion (one time; former)

== Mixed martial arts record ==
Professional record breakdown
| 13 matches | 11 wins | 2 losses |
| By knockout | 5 | 0 |
| By submission | 2 | 2 |
| By decision | 4 | 0 |

| Res. | Record | Opponent | Method | Event | Date | Round | Time | Location | Notes |
|---|---|---|---|---|---|---|---|---|---|
| Win | 11–2 | Ham Seo-hee | TKO (punches to the body) | ONE Fight Night 14 | September 30, 2023 | 3 | 1:04 | Kallang, Singapore | Won the vacant ONE Women's Atomweight Championship (115 lb). Performance of the Night. Later vacated the title due to injury. |
| Win | 10–2 | Alyse Anderson | KO (body kick) | ONE Fight Night 10 | May 5, 2023 | 2 | 2:27 | Broomfield, Colorado, United States | Performance of the Night. |
| Win | 9–2 | Jihin Radzuan | Decision (unanimous) | ONE on Prime Video 2 | October 1, 2022 | 3 | 5:00 | Kallang, Singapore | Catchweight (120.75 lb) bout; Radzuan missed weight. |
| Loss | 8–2 | Angela Lee | Submission (rear-naked choke) | ONE: X | March 26, 2022 | 2 | 4:50 | Kallang, Singapore | For the ONE Women's Atomweight Championship (115 lb). |
| Win | 8–1 | Ritu Phogat | Submission (armbar) | ONE: Winter Warriors | December 3, 2021 | 2 | 2:14 | Kallang, Singapore | Won the ONE Women's Atomweight World Grand Prix. |
| Win | 7–1 | Julie Mezabarba | Decision (unanimous) | ONE: NextGen | October 29, 2021 | 3 | 5:00 | Kallang, Singapore | ONE Women's Atomweight World Grand Prix Semifinal. |
| Win | 6–1 | Alyona Rassohyna | Decision (split) | ONE: Empower | September 3, 2021 | 3 | 5:00 | Kallang, Singapore | ONE Women's Atomweight World Grand Prix Quarterfinal. |
| Loss | 5–1 | Alyona Rassohyna | Submission (guillotine choke) | ONE: Unbreakable 3 | January 22, 2021 | 3 | 4:53 | Kallang, Singapore | |
| Win | 5–0 | Sunisa Srisen | TKO (punches) | ONE: No Surrender | July 31, 2020 | 1 | 3:57 | Bangkok, Thailand | |
| Win | 4–0 | Puja Tomar | TKO (punches and elbows) | ONE: A New Tomorrow | January 10, 2020 | 1 | 4:27 | Bangkok, Thailand | |
| Win | 3–0 | Bi Nguyen | Decision (unanimous) | ONE: Masters of Fate | November 8, 2019 | 3 | 5:00 | Pasay, Philippines | |
| Win | 2–0 | Asha Roka | Submission (rear-naked choke) | ONE: Dreams of Gold | August 16, 2019 | 3 | 1:29 | Bangkok, Thailand | |
| Win | 1–0 | Rashi Shinde | KO (head kick) | ONE Warrior Series 2 | July 19, 2018 | 1 | 0:19 | Jurong, Singapore | Strawweight debut. |

== Muay Thai & Kickboxing record ==
Muay Thai and Kickboxing record (incomplete)
65 Wins, 18 Losses, 5 Draws
| Date | Result | Opponent | Event | Location | Method | Round | Time |
| 2026-06-26 | Win | (United States) Selina Flores | ONE Fight Night 47, Lumpinee Stadium | Bangkok, Thailand | Decision (Split) | 3 | 3:00 |
| 2025-11-16 | Loss | (Japan) KANA | ONE 173 | Tokyo, Japan | Decision (Unanimous) | 3 | 3:00 |
| 2023-01-14 | Win | (Thailand) Supergirl Jaroonsak | ONE on Prime Video 6 | Bangkok, Thailand | Decision (Split) | 3 | 3:00 |
| 2020-08-28 | Loss | (Brazil) Allycia Rodrigues | ONE Championship: A New Breed | Bangkok, Thailand | Decision (Majority) | 5 | 3:00 |
Loses ONE Atomweight Muay Thai World Title.
| 2020-02-28 | Loss | (United States) Janet Todd | ONE Championship: King of the Jungle | Kallang, Singapore | Decision (Split) | 5 | 3:00 |
Loses ONE Atomweight Kickboxing World Title.
| 2019-06-15 | Win | (Australia) Alma Juniku | ONE Championship: Legendary Quest | Shanghai, China | Decision (Unanimous) | 5 | 3:00 |
Defended ONE Atomweight Muay Thai World Title
| 2019-02-22 | Win | (United States) Janet Todd | ONE Championship: Call to Greatness | Kallang, Singapore | Decision (Unanimous) | 5 | 3:00 |
Won ONE Atomweight Muay Thai World Title
| 2018-10-06 | Win | (Taiwan) Kai Ting Chuang | ONE Championship: Kingdom of Heroes | Bangkok, Thailand | Decision (Unanimous) | 5 | 3:00 |
Won ONE Atomweight Kickboxing World Title
| 2017-03-28 | Win | (United States) Sylvie Petchrungruang | Thepprasit Stadium | Pattaya, Thailand | Decision | 5 | 3:00 |
Wins the 108 lbs Thepprasit Stadium title
| 2016-08-13 | Win | (Thailand) Saokhonkaen Sor Sompol | PPTV Muay Thai Fight Night | Bangkok, Thailand | Decision | 3 | 3:00 |
Legend: Win Loss Draw/No contest Notes

== See also ==
- List of current ONE fighters
- List of female kickboxers
- List of female mixed martial artists
- List of multi-sport athletes
- List of multi-sport champions
