= ONE: X =

Combat sport events in 2022

ONE X: 10 Years Anniversary
- The poster for ONE X: 10 Years Anniversary
- Promotion: ONE Championship
- Date: March 26, 2022
- Venue: Singapore Indoor Stadium
- City: Kallang, Singapore

Event chronology
ONE: Lights Out	ONE X: 10 Years Anniversary	ONE 156: Eersel vs. Sadiković

ONE X: 10 Years Anniversary was a Combat sport event produced by ONE Championship that took place on March 26, 2022, at the Singapore Indoor Stadium in Kallang, Singapore.

== Background ==
On 27 October 2021, CEO Chatri Sityodtong broke the news that ONE: X would be postponed to early 2022, owing to a recent surge in the COVID-19 pandemic in Singapore. The event was later rescheduled for March 26, 2022.

A Special-Rules bout between current ONE Flyweight Muay Thai World Champion Rodtang Jitmuangnon and former UFC Flyweight Champion (also 2019 ONE Flyweight World Grand Prix Champion) Demetrious Johnson took place at the co-main event. The contest was set for four, three-minute rounds alternating between Muay Thai and MMA rules. The fight started under Muay Thai rules and switched to MMA for the following round.

A ONE Women's Atomweight World Championship bout between current champion Angela Lee and former ONE Women's Atomweight Muay Thai and Kickboxing World Champion (also 2021 ONE Women's Atomweight World Grand Prix Champion) Stamp Fairtex headlined the event.

ONE Bantamweight Muay Thai World Champion Nong-O Gaiyanghadao was scheduled to defend his title against former ONE Bantamweight Kickboxing World Champion Alaverdi Ramazanov. However, Because of the Russian invasion of Ukraine, Ramazanov was replaced with the Brazilian Felipe Lobo.

John Wayne Parr faced former two-time ONE Lightweight World Champion Eduard Folayang in Wushu vs. Muay Thai legends fight and It's the last fight of Parr in professional competition.

Shinya Aoki and Yoshihiro Akiyama faced one another at ONE X in a clash of Japanese MMA legends.

Top Filipino strawweights Lito Adiwang and Jeremy Miado faced each other at this event. A rematch between Seo Hee Ham and Denice Zamboanga was also booked for the event. A featherweight fight between Amir Khan and Ryogo Takahashi was added to the ONE: X card.

Reinier de Ridder and Andre Galvao met in a submission grappling match. The American Danielle Kelly made her debut at ONE X in an atomweight submission grappling match against Japanese veteran Mei Yamaguchi.

Nieky Holzken was scheduled to face Islam Murtazaev in a fight between two top lightweight Kickboxing contenders. Shoko Sato was to meet Yusup Saadulaev in a battle of formerly ranked bantamweight contenders. The card also featured Ryuto Sawada and Senzo Ikeda, who meet in a strawweight contest. However, due to the 2022 Russian invasion of Ukraine, all Russian athletes were removed from the card as a result of the Singaporean government banning them from entering the country. As a result, Murtazaev was replaced by Sinsamut Klinmee and Yusup Saadulaev was replaced by Stephen Loman.

Alyse Anderson was scheduled to fight with Indian striker Asha Roka. However, Anderson withdraw from the bout for medical reasons and the fight was rescheduled for ONE 157.

== Results ==
Grand Finale (PPV on Watch ONE)
Weight class				Method	Round	Time	Notes
Women's Atomweight	Angela Lee (c)	def.	Stamp Fairtex	Submission (rear-naked choke)	2	4:50	(Note: For the ONE Women's Atomweight World Championship)
Flyweight	Demetrious Johnson	def.	Rodtang Jitmuangnon	Technical Submission (rear-naked choke)	2	2:13	(Note: Special rules bout (Muay Thai - MMA).)
Flyweight	Adriano Moraes (c)	def.	Yuya Wakamatsu	Submission (guillotine choke)	3	3:58	(Note: For the ONE Flyweight World Championship.)
Lightweight	Yoshihiro Akiyama	def.	Shinya Aoki	TKO (punches)	2	1:50
Lightweight Muay Thai	Eduard Folayang	def.	John Wayne Parr	Decision (unanimous)	3	3:00
Featherweight Kickboxing	Superbon Singha Mawynn (c)	def.	Marat Grigorian	Decision (unanimous)	5	3:00	(Note: For the ONE Featherweight Kickboxing World Championship)
Part II (YouTube / Facebook / Watch ONE)
Bantamweight Muay Thai	Nong-O Gaiyanghadao (c)	def.	Felipe Lobo	KO (punch)	3	2:15	(Note: For the ONE Bantamweight Muay Thai World Championship)
Bantamweight Kickboxing	Hiroki Akimoto	def.	Capitan Petchyindee (c)	Decision (unanimous)	5	3:00	(Note: For the ONE Bantamweight Kickboxing World Championship.)
Women's Atomweight	Ham Seo-hee	def.	Denice Zamboanga	Decision (unanimous)	3	5:00
Women's Atomweight	Jihin Radzuan	def.	Itsuki Hirata	Decision (split)	3	5:00
Featherweight	Tang Kai	def.	Kim Jae-woong	KO (punches)	1	2:07
Part I (YouTube / Facebook / Watch ONE)
Featherweight Kickboxing	Chingiz Allazov	def.	Sitthichai Sitsongpeenong	Decision (unanimous)	3	3:00	(Note: ONE Featherweight Kickboxing World Grand Prix Tournament Final bout.)
Middleweight Submission Grappling	Reinier de Ridder	vs.	André Galvão	Draw (time expire)	1	12:00
Lightweight Muay Thai	Sinsamut Klinmee	def.	Nieky Holzken	KO (punch)	2	1:39
Strawweight	Jeremy Miado	def.	Lito Adiwang	TKO (knee injury)	2	2:56
Bantamweight	Stephen Loman	def.	Shoko Sato	Decision (unanimous)	3	5:00
Featherweight	Amir Khan	def.	Ryogo Takahashi	Decision (split)	3	5:00
Heavyweight	Kang Ji-won	def.	Paul Elliot	KO (punch)	1	0:58
Women's Atomweight Submission Grappling	Mei Yamaguchi	vs.	Danielle Kelly	Draw (time expire)	1	12:00
Strawweight	Senzo Ikeda	def.	Ryuto Sawada	TKO (knees)	2	3:09

== Bonus awards ==
The following fighters received $50,000 bonuses.

- Performance of the Night: Angela Lee, Yoshihiro Akiyama, John Wayne Parr, Hiroki Akimoto, Tang Kai, Sinsamut Klinmee, Kang Ji Won and Danielle Kelly

== See also ==
- 2022 in ONE Championship
- List of ONE Championship events
- List of current ONE fighters
