= ONE 168 =

Combat sport events in 2024

ONE 168: Denver
- The poster for ONE 168: Denver
- Promotion: ONE Championship
- Date: September 6, 2024
- Venue: Ball Arena
- City: Denver, Colorado, United States

Event chronology
ONE Friday Fights 78: Pakorn vs. Reis	ONE 168: Denver	ONE Friday Fights 79: Kongchai vs. Abdulmuslimov

ONE 168: Denver was a combat sport event produced by ONE Championship that took place on September 6, 2024, at the Ball Arena in Denver, Colorado, United States.

== Background ==
The event marked the promotion's second visit to the United States and second in Colorado, since ONE Fight Night 10, which took place in Broomfield in May 2023.

A ONE Women's Strawweight World Championship bout between current champion Xiong Jing Nan and the ONE Women's Atomweight Champion (also ONE Women's Atomweight World Grand Prix winner, former ONE Women's Atomweight Muay Thai and Kickboxing World Champion) Stamp Fairtex was expected to headline the event. However on May 21, it was announced that Stamp was forced to withdraw due to serious knee injury.

A ONE Bantamweight Muay Thai World Championship bout between current champion (also the ONE Bantamweight Kickboxing Champion and former ONE Flyweight Muay Thai Champion) Jonathan Haggerty and the ONE Flyweight Kickboxing Champion Superlek Kiatmuu9 served as the new main event. The pairing previously met at Yokkao 31 in October 2018, which Superlek won by TKO in second round.

A ONE Lightweight Submission Grappling World Championship bout between current champion (also 2022 ADCC World Champion) Kade Ruotolo and Mikey Musumeci was expected to take place at the event. However, on September 1, it was announced that Ruotolo had withdrawn from the bout due to injury. Musumeci now was expected to face Bebeto Oliveira in a flyweight title instead. At the weigh-ins, Musumeci came in at 142 lb, 6 pounds over the flyweight limit for a title fight. As a result, Musumeci was stripped of the title and only Oliveira was eligible to win it. In turn, the bout was cancelled when Musumeci has elected not to fight despite being offered an openweight as well.

A lightweight bout between Maurice Abévi and Samat Mamedov was removed from the event after Mamedov pulled out with a broken arm during the weigh-ins.

At the weigh-ins, the bout between Aung La Nsang and Shamil Erdogan moved to 213.75 lb after the pairing missed weight and hydration in the designated time window. Josue Cruz missed weight (142 lb) and was fined 30% of his purse to Johan Ghazali, Ghazali has also re-weighed in at 141.5 lb.

== Results ==
Fight card (Amazon Prime Video)
Weight class				Method	Round	Time	Notes
Bantamweight Muay Thai	Superlek Kiatmuu9	def.	Jonathan Haggerty (c)	KO (elbow)	1	0:49	(Note: For the ONE Bantamweight Muay Thai World Championship.)
Catchweight (140 lbs) Muay Thai	Saeksan Or. Kwanmuang	def.	Liam Harrison	TKO (punches)	2	1:49
Catchweight (215 lbs)	Shamil Erdogan	def.	Aung La Nsang	TKO (punches)	2	2:48	(Note: Both fighters missed weight: Aung La (210 lb) and Erdogan (213.75 lb).)
Bantamweight Muay Thai	John Lineker	def.	Asa Ten Pow	KO (punch)	2	2:50
Women's Atomweight	Victória Souza	def.	Alyse Anderson	Decision (unanimous)	3	5:00
Welterweight	Isi Fitikefu	def.	Hiroyuki Tetsuka	Decision (unanimous)	3	5:00
Lightweight	Adrian Lee	def.	Nicholas Cornejo	Submission (rear-naked choke)	1	2:37
Flyweight Muay Thai	Johan Ghazali	def.	Josue Cruz	KO (punches)	1	3:00	(Note: Cruz missed weight (142 lb).)
Flyweight Muay Thai	Johan Estupiñan	def.	Sean Climaco	TKO (punch)	2	1:28

== Bonus awards ==
The following fighters received $50,000 bonuses.

- Performance of the Night: Superlek Kiatmuu9, Saeksan Or. Kwanmuang, John Lineker, Adrian Lee, Johan Ghazali and Johan Estupiñan

== See also ==
- 2024 in ONE Championship
- List of ONE Championship events
- List of current ONE fighters
- ONE Championship Rankings
