= ONE Fight Night 37 =

Combat sport events in 2025

ONE Fight Night 37: Kryklia vs. Agdeve
- Promotion: ONE Championship
- Date: November 8, 2025
- Venue: Lumpinee Boxing Stadium
- City: Bangkok, Thailand

Event chronology
ONE Fight Night 36: Prajanchai vs. Di Bella 2	ONE Fight Night 37: Kryklia vs. Agdeve	ONE 173: Superbon vs. Noiri

ONE Fight Night 37: Kryklia vs. Agdeve was a combat sports event produced by ONE Championship that took place on November 8, 2025, at Lumpinee Boxing Stadium in Bangkok, Thailand.

== Background ==
An inaugural ONE Heavyweight Kickboxing World Championship bout between current ONE Heavyweight Muay Thai and Light Heavyweight Kickboxing World Champion Roman Kryklia and promotional newcomer Samet Agdeve headlined the event.

At the weigh-ins, two fighters failed to hydration test and missed weight for their respective fights:

- Avazbek Kholmirzaev weighed in at 139.2 pounds, 4.2 pounds over the flyweight limit and he was fined 30 percent of his purse which went to Willie Van Rooyen.
- Mauro Mastromarini weighted in at 140 pounds, 5 pounds over the flyweight limit and he was fined 30 percent of his purse which went to Lito Adiwang.

== Results ==
Fight card (Amazon Prime Video)
Weight class				Method	Round	Time	Notes
Heavyweight Kickboxing	Samet Agdeve	def.	Roman Kryklia	Decision (unanimous)	5	3:00	(Note: For the inaugural ONE Heavyweight Kickboxing World Championship.)
Featherweight Muay Thai	Nico Carrillo	def.	Luke Lessei	TKO (punches and knees)	2	2:35
Bantamweight Muay Thai	Black Panther VenumMuayThai	def.	Johan Estupiñan	TKO (punch)	2	1:29
Bantamweight	Elbek Alyshov	def.	Carlo Bumina-ang	Submission (guillotine choke)	2	3:24
Flyweight	Avazbek Kholmirzaev	def.	Willie Van Rooyen	Submission (armbar)	1	3:52	(Note: Kholmirzaev missed weight (139.2 lb).)
Flyweight	Lito Adiwang	def.	Mauro Mastromarini	TKO (punches)	1	4:53	(Note: Mastromarini missed weight (140 lb).)
Flyweight Muay Thai	Taiki Naito	def.	Nakrob Fairtex	KO (punch)	1	2:30
Flyweight	Gilbert Nakatani	def.	Eko Roni Saputra	TKO (punches)	1	2:01

== See also ==
- 2025 in ONE Championship
- List of ONE Championship events
- List of current ONE fighters
- ONE Championship Rankings
