= List of ONE Championship events =

This is a list of events held and scheduled by the ONE Championship (ONE), a mixed martial arts promotion based in Singapore. ONE's inaugural event, ONE FC 1: Champion vs. Champion, took place on September 3, 2011.

== Scheduled events ==
#	Event	Date	Venue	Location	Attendance	Ref.
396	ONE Fight Night 49	December 12, 2026	Lumpinee Boxing Stadium	Bangkok, Thailand		
395	ONE Fight Night 48	November 7, 2026	Lumpinee Boxing Stadium	Bangkok, Thailand		
394	ONE Fight Night 47	October 3, 2026	Lumpinee Boxing Stadium	Bangkok, Thailand		
393	ONE Fight Night 46	September 5, 2026	Lumpinee Boxing Stadium	Bangkok, Thailand		
392	ONE Fight Night 45	August 8, 2026	Lumpinee Boxing Stadium	Bangkok, Thailand		
391	ONE Fight Night 44	July 11, 2026	Lumpinee Boxing Stadium	Bangkok, Thailand		
390	ONE: Denver	June 26, 2026	Ball Arena	Denver, Colorado, United States		
389	ONE Fight Night 43	May 16, 2026	Lumpinee Boxing Stadium	Bangkok, Thailand		
388	ONE Samurai 1	April 29, 2026	Ariake Arena	Tokyo, Japan		
387	ONE Fight Night 42	April 11, 2026	Lumpinee Boxing Stadium	Bangkok, Thailand		
386	ONE 174	April 3, 2026	TBD	TBD		
385	ONE Friday Fights 148	March 27, 2026	Lumpinee Boxing Stadium	Bangkok, Thailand		
384	ONE Friday Fights 147	March 20, 2026	Lumpinee Boxing Stadium	Bangkok, Thailand		
383	ONE Fight Night 41	March 14, 2026	Lumpinee Boxing Stadium	Bangkok, Thailand		
382	ONE Friday Fights 146	March 13, 2026	Lumpinee Boxing Stadium	Bangkok, Thailand		
381	ONE Friday Fights 145	March 6, 2026	Lumpinee Boxing Stadium	Bangkok, Thailand		
380	ONE Friday Fights 144	February 27, 2026	Lumpinee Boxing Stadium	Bangkok, Thailand		
379	ONE Friday Fights 143	February 20, 2026	Lumpinee Boxing Stadium	Bangkok, Thailand		

== Past events ==
#	Event	Date	Venue	Location	Attendance
378	ONE Fight Night 40: Buntan vs. Hemetsberger 2	February 14, 2026	Lumpinee Boxing Stadium	Bangkok, Thailand	
377	ONE Friday Fights 142: Apiwat vs. Panpadej	February 13, 2026	Lumpinee Boxing Stadium	Bangkok, Thailand	
376	ONE Friday Fights 141: Komawut vs. Samingdam	February 6, 2026	Lumpinee Boxing Stadium	Bangkok, Thailand	
375	ONE Friday Fights 140: Kongchai vs. Thway Lin Htet	January 30, 2026	Lumpinee Boxing Stadium	Bangkok, Thailand	
374	ONE Fight Night 39: Rambolek vs. Dayakaev	January 24, 2026	Lumpinee Boxing Stadium	Bangkok, Thailand	
373	ONE Friday Fights 139: Worapon vs. Soe Lin Oo	January 23, 2026	Lumpinee Boxing Stadium	Bangkok, Thailand	
372	ONE Friday Fights 138: Pompet vs. Decho	January 16, 2026	Lumpinee Boxing Stadium	Bangkok, Thailand	
371	ONE Friday Fights 137: Tawanchai vs. Liu	December 19, 2025	Lumpinee Boxing Stadium	Bangkok, Thailand	
370	ONE Friday Fights 136: Petkhaokradong vs. Kelat	December 12, 2025	Lumpinee Boxing Stadium	Bangkok, Thailand	
369	ONE Fight Night 38: Andrade vs. Baatarkhuu	December 6, 2025	Lumpinee Boxing Stadium	Bangkok, Thailand	
368	ONE Friday Fights 135: Worapon vs. Lobo	November 28, 2025	Lumpinee Boxing Stadium	Bangkok, Thailand	
367	ONE Friday Fights 134: Yodlekpet vs. Mammadov	November 21, 2025	Lumpinee Boxing Stadium	Bangkok, Thailand	
366	ONE 173: Superbon vs. Noiri	November 16, 2025	Ariake Arena	Tokyo, Japan	
365	ONE Friday Fights 133: Pompet vs. Thom	November 14, 2025	Lumpinee Boxing Stadium	Bangkok, Thailand	
364	ONE Fight Night 37: Kryklia vs. Agdeve	November 8, 2025	Lumpinee Boxing Stadium	Bangkok, Thailand	
363	ONE Friday Fights 132: Kompetch vs. Ondash	November 7, 2025	Lumpinee Boxing Stadium	Bangkok, Thailand	
362	ONE Friday Fights 131: Suriyanlek vs. Decho 2	October 31, 2025	Lumpinee Boxing Stadium	Bangkok, Thailand	
361	ONE Friday Fights 130: Nonthachai vs. Şen	October 24, 2025	Lumpinee Boxing Stadium	Bangkok, Thailand	
360	ONE Friday Fights 129: Tengnueng vs. Tun Min Aung	October 17, 2025	Lumpinee Boxing Stadium	Bangkok, Thailand	
359	ONE Friday Fights 128: Irvine vs. Rambong	October 10, 2025	Lumpinee Boxing Stadium	Bangkok, Thailand	
358	ONE Fight Night 36: Prajanchai vs. Di Bella 2	October 4, 2025	Lumpinee Boxing Stadium	Bangkok, Thailand	
357	ONE Friday Fights 127: Worapon vs. Kongkula	October 3, 2025	Lumpinee Boxing Stadium	Bangkok, Thailand	
356	ONE Friday Fights 126: Ennahachi vs. Anane	September 26, 2025	Lumpinee Boxing Stadium	Bangkok, Thailand	
355	ONE Friday Fights 125: Saemapetch vs. Osmanov	September 19, 2025	Lumpinee Boxing Stadium	Bangkok, Thailand	
354	ONE Friday Fights 124: Suriyanlek vs. Decho	September 12, 2025	Lumpinee Boxing Stadium	Bangkok, Thailand	
353	ONE Fight Night 35: Buntan vs. Hemetsberger	September 6, 2025	Lumpinee Boxing Stadium	Bangkok, Thailand	
352	ONE Friday Fights 123: Lobo vs. Kulabdam	September 5, 2025	Lumpinee Boxing Stadium	Bangkok, Thailand	
351	ONE Friday Fights 122: Panpayak vs. Imangazaliev	August 29, 2025	Lumpinee Boxing Stadium	Bangkok, Thailand	
350	ONE Friday Fights 121: Tengnueng vs. Bakhtin	August 22, 2025	Lumpinee Boxing Stadium	Bangkok, Thailand	
349	ONE Friday Fights 120: Yodlekpet vs. Pompet	August 15, 2025	Lumpinee Boxing Stadium	Bangkok, Thailand	
348	ONE Friday Fights 119: Samingdam vs. Sonrak	August 8, 2025	Lumpinee Boxing Stadium	Bangkok, Thailand	
347	ONE Fight Night 34: Eersel vs. Jarvis	August 2, 2025	Lumpinee Boxing Stadium	Bangkok, Thailand	
346	ONE Friday Fights 118: Worapon vs. Şen 3	August 1, 2025	Lumpinee Boxing Stadium	Bangkok, Thailand	
345	ONE Friday Fights 117: Yod-IQ vs. Malatesta	July 25, 2025	Lumpinee Boxing Stadium	Bangkok, Thailand	
344	ONE Friday Fights 116: Adam vs. Mohammed 2	July 18, 2025	Lumpinee Boxing Stadium	Bangkok, Thailand	
343	ONE Fight Night 33: Rodrigues vs. Persson	July 12, 2025	Lumpinee Boxing Stadium	Bangkok, Thailand	
342	ONE Friday Fights 115: Rambong vs. Suriyanlek	July 4, 2025	Lumpinee Boxing Stadium	Bangkok, Thailand	
341	ONE Friday Fights 114: Sangarthit vs. Suablack	June 27, 2025	Lumpinee Boxing Stadium	Bangkok, Thailand	
340	ONE Friday Fights 113: Donking vs. Yodlekpet	June 20, 2025	Lumpinee Boxing Stadium	Bangkok, Thailand	
339	ONE Friday Fights 112: Singdomthong vs. Ondash	June 13, 2025	Lumpinee Boxing Stadium	Bangkok, Thailand	
338	ONE Fight Night 32: Nakrob vs. Jaosuayai	June 7, 2025	Lumpinee Boxing Stadium	Bangkok, Thailand	
337	ONE Friday Fights 111: Phetsukumvit vs. Vitez	June 6, 2025	Lumpinee Boxing Stadium	Bangkok, Thailand	
336	ONE Friday Fights 110: Worapon vs. Musaev	May 30, 2025	Lumpinee Boxing Stadium	Bangkok, Thailand	
335	ONE Friday Fights 109: Yod-IQ vs. Delval	May 23, 2025	Lumpinee Boxing Stadium	Bangkok, Thailand	
334	ONE Friday Fights 108: Chokpreecha vs. Kongchai 2	May 16, 2025	Lumpinee Boxing Stadium	Bangkok, Thailand	
333	ONE Friday Fights 107: Ortikov vs. Dedduanglek	May 9, 2025	Lumpinee Boxing Stadium	Bangkok, Thailand	
332	ONE Fight Night 31: Kongthoranee vs. Nong-O 2	May 3, 2025	Lumpinee Boxing Stadium	Bangkok, Thailand	
331	ONE Friday Fights 106: Panrit vs. Suksawat	May 2, 2025	Lumpinee Boxing Stadium	Bangkok, Thailand	
330	ONE Friday Fights 105: Kongsuk vs. Lamnamoonlek 2	April 18, 2025	Lumpinee Boxing Stadium	Bangkok, Thailand	
329	ONE Friday Fights 104: Chartpayak vs. Kompetch 2	April 11, 2025	Lumpinee Boxing Stadium	Bangkok, Thailand	
328	ONE Fight Night 30: Kryklia vs. Knowles	April 5, 2025	Lumpinee Boxing Stadium	Bangkok, Thailand	
327	ONE Friday Fights 103: Kulabdam vs. Çiçek	April 4, 2025	Lumpinee Boxing Stadium	Bangkok, Thailand	
—	ONE Friday Fights 102: Rambong vs. Pompet	March 28, 2025	Lumpinee Boxing Stadium	Bangkok, Thailand	Cancelled
326	ONE 172: Takeru vs. Rodtang	March 23, 2025	Saitama Super Arena	Saitama, Japan	15,000
325	ONE Friday Fights 101: Nakrob vs. Puengluang	March 21, 2025	Lumpinee Boxing Stadium	Bangkok, Thailand	
324	ONE Friday Fights 100: Muangthai vs. Abdulmedzhidov	March 14, 2025	Lumpinee Boxing Stadium	Bangkok, Thailand	
323	ONE Fight Night 29: Rodrigues vs. McManamon	March 8, 2025	Lumpinee Boxing Stadium	Bangkok, Thailand	
322	ONE Friday Fights 99: Yod-IQ vs. Morari	March 7, 2025	Lumpinee Boxing Stadium	Bangkok, Thailand	
321	ONE Friday Fights 98: Chartpayak vs. Kongchai	February 28, 2025	Lumpinee Boxing Stadium	Bangkok, Thailand	
320	ONE 171: Qatar	February 20, 2025	Lusail Sports Arena	Lusail, Qatar	
319	ONE Friday Fights 97: Kongsuk vs. Lamnamoonlek	February 14, 2025	Lumpinee Boxing Stadium	Bangkok, Thailand	
318	ONE Fight Night 28: Prajanchai vs. Barboza	February 8, 2025	Lumpinee Boxing Stadium	Bangkok, Thailand	
317	ONE Friday Fights 96: Komawut vs. Panrit 2	February 7, 2025	Lumpinee Boxing Stadium	Bangkok, Thailand	
316	ONE Friday Fights 95: Yodlekpet vs. Jaosuayai	January 31, 2025	Lumpinee Boxing Stadium	Bangkok, Thailand	
315	ONE 170: Tawanchai vs. Superbon 2	January 24, 2025	Impact Arena	Bangkok, Thailand	
314	ONE Friday Fights 94: Puengluang vs. Guluzada	January 17, 2025	Lumpinee Boxing Stadium	Bangkok, Thailand	
313	ONE Fight Night 27: Tang vs. Abdullaev	January 11, 2025	Lumpinee Boxing Stadium	Bangkok, Thailand	
312	ONE Friday Fights 93: Kongchai vs. Ondash	January 10, 2025	Lumpinee Boxing Stadium	Bangkok, Thailand	
311	ONE Friday Fights 92: Sitthichai vs. Shadow	December 20, 2024	Lumpinee Boxing Stadium	Bangkok, Thailand	
310	ONE Friday Fights 91: Komawut vs. Balyko	December 13, 2024	Lumpinee Boxing Stadium	Bangkok, Thailand	
309	ONE Fight Night 26: Lee vs. Rasulov	December 7, 2024	Lumpinee Boxing Stadium	Bangkok, Thailand	
308	ONE Friday Fights 90: Kongklai vs. Kacem	December 6, 2024	Lumpinee Boxing Stadium	Bangkok, Thailand	
307	ONE Friday Fights 89: Yod-IQ vs. Khomutov	November 29, 2024	Lumpinee Boxing Stadium	Bangkok, Thailand	
306	ONE Friday Fights 88: Pompet vs. Ortikov	November 22, 2024	Lumpinee Boxing Stadium	Bangkok, Thailand	
305	ONE Friday Fights 87: Kongchai vs. Chokpreecha	November 15, 2024	Lumpinee Boxing Stadium	Bangkok, Thailand	
304	ONE 169: Malykhin vs. Reug Reug	November 9, 2024	Lumpinee Boxing Stadium	Bangkok, Thailand	
303	ONE Friday Fights 86: Kompetch vs. Chartpayak	November 8, 2024	Lumpinee Boxing Stadium	Bangkok, Thailand	
302	ONE Friday Fights 85: Yodlekpet vs. Puengluang	November 1, 2024	Lumpinee Boxing Stadium	Bangkok, Thailand	
301	ONE Friday Fights 84: Kongsuk vs. Muangthai	October 25, 2024	Lumpinee Boxing Stadium	Bangkok, Thailand	
300	ONE Friday Fights 83: Panrit vs. Superball	October 18, 2024	Lumpinee Boxing Stadium	Bangkok, Thailand	
299	ONE Fight Night 25: Nicolas vs. Eersel 2	October 5, 2024	Lumpinee Boxing Stadium	Bangkok, Thailand	
298	ONE Friday Fights 82: Yod-IQ vs. Dayakaev	October 4, 2024	Lumpinee Boxing Stadium	Bangkok, Thailand	
297	ONE Friday Fights 81: Superbon vs. Nattawut	September 27, 2024	Lumpinee Boxing Stadium	Bangkok, Thailand	
296	ONE Friday Fights 80: Rak vs. Yodnumchai	September 20, 2024	Lumpinee Boxing Stadium	Bangkok, Thailand	
295	ONE Friday Fights 79: Kongchai vs. Abdulmuslimov	September 13, 2024	Lumpinee Boxing Stadium	Bangkok, Thailand	
294	ONE 168: Denver	September 6, 2024	Ball Arena	Denver, Colorado, United States	
293	ONE Friday Fights 78: Pakorn vs. Reis	September 6, 2024	Lumpinee Boxing Stadium	Bangkok, Thailand	
292	ONE Friday Fights 77: Yodlekpet vs. Kongsuk	August 30, 2024	Lumpinee Boxing Stadium	Bangkok, Thailand	
291	ONE Friday Fights 76: Puengluang vs. Samingdam	August 23, 2024	Lumpinee Boxing Stadium	Bangkok, Thailand	
290	ONE Friday Fights 75: Kompetch vs. El Halabi	August 16, 2024	Lumpinee Boxing Stadium	Bangkok, Thailand	
289	ONE Friday Fights 74: Yodphupha vs. Gheirati	August 9, 2024	Lumpinee Boxing Stadium	Bangkok, Thailand	
288	ONE Fight Night 24: Brooks vs. Balart	August 3, 2024	Lumpinee Boxing Stadium	Bangkok, Thailand	
287	ONE Friday Fights 73: Worapon vs. Panrit	August 2, 2024	Lumpinee Boxing Stadium	Bangkok, Thailand	
286	ONE Friday Fights 72: Kongsuk vs. Ouraghi	July 26, 2024	Lumpinee Boxing Stadium	Bangkok, Thailand	
285	ONE Friday Fights 71: Songchainoi vs. Rak 2	July 19, 2024	Lumpinee Boxing Stadium	Bangkok, Thailand	
284	ONE Friday Fights 70: Focus vs. Irvine	July 12, 2024	Lumpinee Boxing Stadium	Bangkok, Thailand	
283	ONE Fight Night 23	July 6, 2024	Lumpinee Boxing Stadium	Bangkok, Thailand	
282	ONE Friday Fights 69: Kulabdam vs. Anane	July 5, 2024	Lumpinee Boxing Stadium	Bangkok, Thailand	
281	ONE Friday Fights 68: Prajanchai vs. Di Bella	June 28, 2024	Lumpinee Boxing Stadium	Bangkok, Thailand	
280	ONE Friday Fights 67: Nakrob vs. Khalilov	June 14, 2024	Lumpinee Boxing Stadium	Bangkok, Thailand	
279	ONE 167: Tawanchai vs. Nattawut 2	June 8, 2024	Impact Arena	Bangkok, Thailand	
278	ONE Friday Fights 66: Kongchai vs. Hamidi	June 7, 2024	Lumpinee Boxing Stadium	Bangkok, Thailand	
277	ONE Friday Fights 65: Jaosuayai vs. Puengluang	May 31, 2024	Lumpinee Boxing Stadium	Bangkok, Thailand	
276	ONE Friday Fights 64: Gheirati vs. Godtfredsen	May 24, 2024	Lumpinee Boxing Stadium	Bangkok, Thailand	
275	ONE Friday Fights 63: Yodphupha vs. Şen	May 17, 2024	Lumpinee Boxing Stadium	Bangkok, Thailand	
273	ONE Friday Fights 62: Mongkolkaew vs. ET 2	May 10, 2024	Lumpinee Boxing Stadium	Bangkok, Thailand	
273	ONE Fight Night 22: Sundell vs. Diachkova	May 4, 2024	Lumpinee Boxing Stadium	Bangkok, Thailand	
272	ONE Friday Fights 61: Phetsukumvit vs. Duangsompong	May 3, 2024	Lumpinee Boxing Stadium	Bangkok, Thailand	
271	ONE Friday Fights 60: Suriyanlek vs. Rittidet	April 26, 2024	Lumpinee Boxing Stadium	Bangkok, Thailand	
270	ONE Friday Fights 59: Yamin vs. Ouraghi	April 19, 2024	Lumpinee Boxing Stadium	Bangkok, Thailand	
269	ONE Fight Night 21: Eersel vs. Nicolas	April 6, 2024	Lumpinee Boxing Stadium	Bangkok, Thailand	
268	ONE Friday Fights 58: Superbon vs. Grigorian 3	April 5, 2024	Lumpinee Boxing Stadium	Bangkok, Thailand	
267	ONE Friday Fights 57: Panrit vs. Balyko	March 29, 2024	Lumpinee Boxing Stadium	Bangkok, Thailand	
266	ONE Friday Fights 56: Ferrari vs. Tupiev	March 22, 2024	Lumpinee Boxing Stadium	Bangkok, Thailand	
265	ONE Friday Fights 55: Avatar vs. Nabati	March 15, 2024	Lumpinee Boxing Stadium	Bangkok, Thailand	
264	ONE Fight Night 20: Todd vs. Phetjeeja	March 9, 2024	Lumpinee Boxing Stadium	Bangkok, Thailand	
263	ONE Friday Fights 54: Ortikov vs. Watcharapon	March 8, 2024	Lumpinee Boxing Stadium	Bangkok, Thailand	
262	ONE 166: Qatar	March 1, 2024	Lusail Sports Arena	Lusail, Qatar	
261	ONE Friday Fights 53: Phetsukumvit vs. Kongsuk	February 23, 2024	Lumpinee Boxing Stadium	Bangkok, Thailand	
260	ONE Fight Night 19: Haggerty vs. Lobo	February 17, 2024	Lumpinee Boxing Stadium	Bangkok, Thailand	
259	ONE Friday Fights 52: Kulabdam vs. Lobo	February 16, 2024	Lumpinee Boxing Stadium	Bangkok, Thailand	
258	ONE Friday Fights 51: Rambolek vs. Şen	February 9, 2024	Lumpinee Boxing Stadium	Bangkok, Thailand	
257	ONE Friday Fights 50: Yodphupa vs. Komawut	February 2, 2024	Lumpinee Boxing Stadium	Bangkok, Thailand	
256	ONE 165: Superlek vs. Takeru	January 28, 2024	Ariake Arena	Tokyo, Japan	
255	ONE Friday Fights 49: Nakrob vs. Pettonglor	January 26, 2024	Lumpinee Boxing Stadium	Bangkok, Thailand	
254	ONE Friday Fights 48: Kongthoranee vs. Mazoriev	January 19, 2024	Lumpinee Boxing Stadium	Bangkok, Thailand	
253	ONE Fight Night 18: Gasanov Vs. Oh	January 13, 2024	Lumpinee Boxing Stadium	Bangkok, Thailand	
252	ONE Friday Fights 47: Suakim vs. Balyko	January 12, 2024	Lumpinee Boxing Stadium	Bangkok, Thailand	
251	ONE Friday Fights 46: Tawanchai vs. Superbon	December 22, 2023	Lumpinee Boxing Stadium	Bangkok, Thailand	
250	ONE Friday Fights 45: Otop vs. Şen	December 15, 2023	Lumpinee Boxing Stadium	Bangkok, Thailand	
249	ONE Fight Night 17: Kryklia vs. Roberts	December 9, 2023	Lumpinee Boxing Stadium	Bangkok, Thailand	
248	ONE Friday Fights 44: Yod-IQ vs. Musaev	December 8, 2023	Lumpinee Boxing Stadium	Bangkok, Thailand	
247	ONE Friday Fights 43: Kongsuk vs. Pettonglor	December 1, 2023	Lumpinee Boxing Stadium	Bangkok, Thailand	
246	ONE Friday Fights 42: Kaonar vs. Lobo	November 24, 2023	Lumpinee Boxing Stadium	Bangkok, Thailand	
245	ONE Friday Fights 41: Dedduanglek vs. Nakrob	November 17, 2023	Lumpinee Boxing Stadium	Bangkok, Thailand	
244	ONE Friday Fights 40: Jaosuayai vs. Paidang	November 10, 2023	Lumpinee Boxing Stadium	Bangkok, Thailand	
243	ONE Fight Night 16: Haggerty vs. Andrade	November 4, 2023	Lumpinee Boxing Stadium	Bangkok, Thailand	
242	ONE Friday Fights 39: Kongklai vs. Şen	November 3, 2023	Lumpinee Boxing Stadium	Bangkok, Thailand	
241	ONE Friday Fights 38: Otop vs. Musaev	October 27, 2023	Lumpinee Boxing Stadium	Bangkok, Thailand	
240	ONE Friday Fights 37: Bohic vs. Kacem	October 20, 2023	Lumpinee Boxing Stadium	Bangkok, Thailand	
239	ONE Fight Night 15: Le vs. Freymanov	October 7, 2023	Lumpinee Boxing Stadium	Bangkok, Thailand	
238	ONE Friday Fights 36: Superball vs. Lobo	October 6, 2023	Lumpinee Boxing Stadium	Bangkok, Thailand	
237	ONE Fight Night 14: Stamp vs. Ham	September 30, 2023	Singapore Indoor Stadium	Kallang, Singapore	
236	ONE Friday Fights 35: Kongsuk vs. Dedduanglek	September 29, 2023	Lumpinee Boxing Stadium	Bangkok, Thailand	
235	ONE Friday Fights 34: Rodtang vs. Superlek	September 22, 2023	Lumpinee Boxing Stadium	Bangkok, Thailand	
234	ONE Friday Fights 33: Yod-IQ vs. Balyko	September 15, 2023	Lumpinee Boxing Stadium	Bangkok, Thailand	
233	ONE Friday Fights 32: Kompetch vs. Kongchai	September 8, 2023	Lumpinee Boxing Stadium	Bangkok, Thailand	
232	ONE Friday Fights 31: Kongthoranee vs. Kabutov	September 1, 2023	Lumpinee Boxing Stadium	Bangkok, Thailand	
231	ONE Friday Fights 30: Saemapetch vs. Kaonar	August 25, 2023	Lumpinee Boxing Stadium	Bangkok, Thailand	
230	ONE Friday Fights 29: Saeksan vs. Araya	August 18, 2023	Lumpinee Boxing Stadium	Bangkok, Thailand	
229	ONE Friday Fights 28: Kongsuk vs. Jaosuayai	August 11, 2023	Lumpinee Boxing Stadium	Bangkok, Thailand	
228	ONE Fight Night 13: Allazov vs. Grigorian	August 5, 2023	Lumpinee Boxing Stadium	Bangkok, Thailand	
227	ONE Friday Fights 27: Tapaokaew vs. Harrison	August 4, 2023	Lumpinee Boxing Stadium	Bangkok, Thailand	
226	ONE Friday Fights 26: Kulabdam vs. Bohic	July 21, 2023	Lumpinee Boxing Stadium	Bangkok, Thailand	
225	ONE Fight Night 12: Superlek vs. Khalilov	July 15, 2023	Lumpinee Boxing Stadium	Bangkok, Thailand	
224	ONE Friday Fights 25: Nakrob vs. Phetphuthai	July 14, 2023	Lumpinee Boxing Stadium	Bangkok, Thailand	
223	ONE Friday Fights 24: Reis vs. Pongsiri 2	July 7, 2023	Lumpinee Boxing Stadium	Bangkok, Thailand	
222	ONE Friday Fights 23: Paedsanlek vs. Kongklai	June 30, 2023	Lumpinee Boxing Stadium	Bangkok, Thailand	
221	ONE Friday Fights 22: Bhullar vs. Malykhin	June 23, 2023	Lumpinee Boxing Stadium	Bangkok, Thailand	
220	ONE Friday Fights 21: Paidang vs. Kongsuk	June 16, 2023	Lumpinee Boxing Stadium	Bangkok, Thailand	
219	ONE Fight Night 11: Eersel vs. Menshikov	June 10, 2023	Lumpinee Boxing Stadium	Bangkok, Thailand	
218	ONE Friday Fights 20: Phetsukumvit vs. Jaosuayai	June 9, 2023	Lumpinee Boxing Stadium	Bangkok, Thailand	
217	ONE Friday Fights 19: Kulabdam vs. Musaev	June 2, 2023	Lumpinee Boxing Stadium	Bangkok, Thailand	
216	ONE Friday Fights 18: Harrison vs. Pongsiri	May 26, 2023	Lumpinee Boxing Stadium	Bangkok, Thailand	
215	ONE Friday Fights 17: Pompetch vs. Duangsompong	May 19, 2023	Lumpinee Boxing Stadium	Bangkok, Thailand	
214	ONE Friday Fights 16: ET vs. Kongthoranee	May 12, 2023	Lumpinee Boxing Stadium	Bangkok, Thailand	
213	ONE Fight Night 10: Johnson vs. Moraes 3	May 5, 2023	1stBank Center	Broomfield, Colorado, United States	
212	ONE Friday Fights 15: Nakrob vs. Ploywitthaya	May 5, 2023	Lumpinee Boxing Stadium	Bangkok, Thailand	
211	ONE Friday Fights 14: Gingsanglek vs. Chorfah	April 29, 2023	Lumpinee Boxing Stadium	Bangkok, Thailand	
210	ONE Fight Night 9: Nong-O vs. Haggerty	April 22, 2023	Lumpinee Boxing Stadium	Bangkok, Thailand	
209	ONE Friday Fights 13: Batman vs. Paidang	April 21, 2023	Lumpinee Boxing Stadium	Bangkok, Thailand	
208	ONE Friday Fights 12: Petsukumvit vs. Kongthoranee	April 7, 2023	Lumpinee Boxing Stadium	Bangkok, Thailand	
207	ONE Friday Fights 11: Superball vs. Kongklai 2	March 31, 2023	Lumpinee Boxing Stadium	Bangkok, Thailand	
206	ONE Fight Night 8: Superlek vs. Williams	March 25, 2023	Singapore Indoor Stadium	Kallang, Singapore	
205	ONE Friday Fights 10: Yodkrisada vs. Thepthaksin	March 24, 2023	Lumpinee Boxing Stadium	Bangkok, Thailand	
204	ONE Friday Fights 9: Eersel vs. Sinsamut 2	March 17, 2023	Lumpinee Boxing Stadium	Bangkok, Thailand	
203	ONE Friday Fights 8: Petsukumvit vs. Petchmuangsri	March 10, 2023	Lumpinee Boxing Stadium	Bangkok, Thailand	
202	ONE Friday Fights 7: Rambolek vs. Theeradet	March 3, 2023	Lumpinee Boxing Stadium	Bangkok, Thailand	
201	ONE Fight Night 7: Lineker vs. Andrade 2	February 25, 2023	Lumpinee Boxing Stadium	Bangkok, Thailand	
200	ONE Friday Fights 6: Gingsanglek vs. Kongthoranee	February 24, 2023	Lumpinee Boxing Stadium	Bangkok, Thailand	
199	ONE Friday Fights 5: Kongklai vs. Superball	February 17, 2023	Lumpinee Boxing Stadium	Bangkok, Thailand	
198	ONE Friday Fights 4: Duangsompong vs. Batman	February 10, 2023	Lumpinee Boxing Stadium	Bangkok, Thailand	
197	ONE Friday Fights 3: Chorfah vs. Petsukumvit	February 3, 2023	Lumpinee Boxing Stadium	Bangkok, Thailand	
196	ONE Friday Fights 2: Sangmanee vs. Kulabdam 2	January 27, 2023	Lumpinee Boxing Stadium	Bangkok, Thailand	
195	ONE Friday Fights 1: Nong-O vs. Ramazanov	January 20, 2023	Lumpinee Boxing Stadium	Bangkok, Thailand	
194	ONE Fight Night 6: Superbon vs. Allazov	January 14, 2023	Impact Arena	Bangkok, Thailand	
193	ONE 164: Pacio vs. Brooks	December 3, 2022	SM Mall of Asia Arena	Pasay, Philippines	
192	ONE on Prime Video 5: de Ridder vs. Malykhin	December 3, 2022	SM Mall of Asia Arena	Pasay, Philippines	
191	ONE 163: Akimoto vs. Petchtanong	November 19, 2022	Singapore Indoor Stadium	Kallang, Singapore	
190	ONE on Prime Video 4: Abbasov vs. Lee	November 19, 2022	Singapore Indoor Stadium	Kallang, Singapore	
189	ONE on Prime Video 3: Lineker vs. Andrade	October 22, 2022	Axiata Arena	Kuala Lumpur, Malaysia	
188	ONE 162: Zhang vs. Di Bella	October 21, 2022	Axiata Arena	Kuala Lumpur, Malaysia	
187	ONE on Prime Video 2: Xiong vs. Lee 3	October 1, 2022	Singapore Indoor Stadium	Kallang, Singapore	
186	ONE 161: Petchmorakot vs. Tawanchai	September 29, 2022	Singapore Indoor Stadium	Kallang, Singapore	
185	ONE on Prime Video 1: Moraes vs. Johnson 2	August 27, 2022	Singapore Indoor Stadium	Kallang, Singapore	
184	ONE 160: Ok vs. Lee 2	August 26, 2022	Singapore Indoor Stadium	Kallang, Singapore	
183	ONE 159: de Ridder vs. Bigdash	July 22, 2022	Singapore Indoor Stadium	Kallang, Singapore	
182	ONE 158: Tawanchai vs. Larsen	June 3, 2022	Singapore Indoor Stadium	Kallang, Singapore	
181	ONE 157: Petchmorakot vs. Vienot	May 20, 2022	Singapore Indoor Stadium	Kallang, Singapore	
180	ONE 156: Eersel vs. Sadiković	April 22, 2022	Singapore Indoor Stadium	Kallang, Singapore	
179	ONE: X	March 26, 2022	Singapore Indoor Stadium	Kallang, Singapore	
178	ONE: Lights Out	March 11, 2022	Singapore Indoor Stadium	Kallang, Singapore	
177	ONE: Full Circle	February 25, 2022	Singapore Indoor Stadium	Kallang, Singapore	
176	ONE: Bad Blood	February 11, 2022	Singapore Indoor Stadium	Kallang, Singapore	
175	ONE: Only the Brave	January 28, 2022	Singapore Indoor Stadium	Kallang, Singapore	
174	ONE: Heavy Hitters	January 14, 2022	Singapore Indoor Stadium	Kallang, Singapore	
173	ONE: Winter Warriors II	December 17, 2021	Singapore Indoor Stadium	Kallang, Singapore	
172	ONE: Winter Warriors	December 3, 2021	Singapore Indoor Stadium	Kallang, Singapore	
171	ONE: NextGen 3	November 26, 2021	Singapore Indoor Stadium	Kallang, Singapore	
170	ONE: NextGen 2	November 12, 2021	Singapore Indoor Stadium	Kallang, Singapore	
169	ONE: NextGen	October 29, 2021	Singapore Indoor Stadium	Kallang, Singapore	
168	ONE: First Strike	October 15, 2021	Singapore Indoor Stadium	Kallang, Singapore	
167	ONE: Revolution	September 24, 2021	Singapore Indoor Stadium	Kallang, Singapore	500
166	ONE: Empower	September 3, 2021	Singapore Indoor Stadium	Kallang, Singapore	
165	ONE: Battleground 3	August 27, 2021	Singapore Indoor Stadium	Kallang, Singapore	
164	ONE: Battleground 2	August 13, 2021	Singapore Indoor Stadium	Kallang, Singapore	
163	ONE: Battleground	July 30, 2021	Singapore Indoor Stadium	Kallang, Singapore	
162	ONE: Full Blast 2	June 11, 2021	Singapore Indoor Stadium	Kallang, Singapore	
161	ONE: Full Blast	May 28, 2021	Singapore Indoor Stadium	Kallang, Singapore	
160	ONE: Dangal	May 15, 2021	Singapore Indoor Stadium	Kallang, Singapore	
159	ONE on TNT 4	April 28, 2021	Singapore Indoor Stadium	Kallang, Singapore	
158	ONE on TNT 3	April 21, 2021	Singapore Indoor Stadium	Kallang, Singapore	
157	ONE on TNT 2	April 14, 2021	Singapore Indoor Stadium	Kallang, Singapore	
156	ONE on TNT 1	April 7, 2021	Singapore Indoor Stadium	Kallang, Singapore	
155	ONE: Fists Of Fury 3	March 19, 2021	Singapore Indoor Stadium	Kallang, Singapore	
154	ONE: Fists Of Fury 2	March 5, 2021	Singapore Indoor Stadium	Kallang, Singapore	
153	ONE: Fists Of Fury	February 26, 2021	Singapore Indoor Stadium	Kallang, Singapore	
152	ONE: Unbreakable 3	February 5, 2021	Singapore Indoor Stadium	Kallang, Singapore	
151	ONE: Unbreakable 2	January 29, 2021	Singapore Indoor Stadium	Kallang, Singapore	
150	ONE: Unbreakable	January 22, 2021	Singapore Indoor Stadium	Kallang, Singapore	
149	ONE: Collision Course 2	December 25, 2020	Singapore Indoor Stadium	Kallang, Singapore	
148	ONE: Collision Course	December 18, 2020	Singapore Indoor Stadium	Kallang, Singapore	
147	ONE: Big Bang 2	December 11, 2020	Singapore Indoor Stadium	Kallang, Singapore	
146	ONE: Big Bang	December 4, 2020	Singapore Indoor Stadium	Kallang, Singapore	
145	ONE: Inside the Matrix 4	November 20, 2020	Singapore Indoor Stadium	Kallang, Singapore	
144	ONE: Inside the Matrix 3	November 13, 2020	Singapore Indoor Stadium	Kallang, Singapore	
143	ONE: Inside the Matrix 2	November 6, 2020	Singapore Indoor Stadium	Kallang, Singapore	
142	ONE: Inside the Matrix	October 30, 2020	Singapore Indoor Stadium	Kallang, Singapore	250
141	ONE: Reign of Dynasties 2	October 16, 2020	Singapore Indoor Stadium	Kallang, Singapore	0
140	ONE: Reign of Dynasties	October 9, 2020	Singapore Indoor Stadium	Kallang, Singapore	0
139	ONE: A New Breed 3	August 28, 2020	IMPACT Arena	Bangkok, Thailand	
138	ONE: A New Breed 2	August 28, 2020	IMPACT Arena	Bangkok, Thailand	
137	ONE: A New Breed	August 28, 2020	IMPACT Arena	Bangkok, Thailand	
136	ONE: No Surrender 3	July 31, 2020	IMPACT Arena	Bangkok, Thailand	0
135	ONE: No Surrender 2	July 31, 2020	IMPACT Arena	Bangkok, Thailand	0
134	ONE: No Surrender	July 31, 2020	IMPACT Arena	Bangkok, Thailand	0
–	ONE: Fists of Fury	July 3, 2020	Singapore Indoor Stadium	Kallang, Singapore	Cancelled
–	ONE: Heart of Heroes	June 26, 2020	Phú Thọ Indoor Stadium	Ho Chi Minh City, Vietnam	Cancelled
133	ONE Hero Series 14	June 21, 2020	—N/a	Shanghai, China	
132	ONE Hero Series 13	June 20, 2020	—N/a	Shanghai, China	
–	ONE: Legendary Warriors	June 19, 2020	Baoshan Arena	Shanghai, China	Cancelled
–	ONE Warrior Series 11	June 11, 2020	—N/a	Kallang, Singapore	Cancelled
–	ONE: Battle for the Ages	June 5, 2020	Istora Senayan	Jakarta, Indonesia	Cancelled
–	ONE: Infinity 2	June 19, 2020	Mall of Asia Arena	Pasay, Philippines	Cancelled
–	ONE: Inspiration	May 8, 2020	Singapore Indoor Stadium	Kallang, Singapore	Cancelled
–	ONE: Dreams	May 1, 2020	Singapore Indoor Stadium	Kallang, Singapore	Cancelled
–	ONE: Strength	April 24, 2020	Singapore Indoor Stadium	Kallang, Singapore	Cancelled
–	ONE: Hope	April 17, 2020	Singapore Indoor Stadium	Kallang, Singapore	Cancelled
–	ONE: Infinity 1	April 10, 2020	SM Mall of Asia Arena	Pasay, Philippines	Cancelled
131	ONE: King of the Jungle	February 28, 2020	Singapore Indoor Stadium	Kallang, Singapore	
130	ONE Warrior Series 10	February 19, 2020	—N/a	Kallang, Singapore	
129	ONE: Warrior's Code	February 7, 2020	Istora Senayan	Jakarta, Indonesia	
128	ONE: Fire & Fury	January 31, 2020	SM Mall of Asia Arena	Pasay, Philippines	
127	ONE: A New Tomorrow	January 10, 2020	Impact Arena	Bangkok, Thailand	
126	ONE Hero Series 12	December 16, 2019	—N/a	Beijing, China	
125	ONE: Mark Of Greatness	December 6, 2019	Axiata Arena	Kuala Lumpur, Malaysia	
124	ONE Warrior Series 9	December 4, 2019	—N/a	Kallang, Singapore	
123	ONE: Edge of Greatness	November 22, 2019	Singapore Indoor Stadium	Kallang, Singapore	
122	ONE Hero Series 11	November 18, 2019	—N/a	Beijing, China	
121	ONE: Age of Dragons	November 16, 2019	Cadillac Arena	Beijing, China	
120	ONE: Masters of Fate	November 8, 2019	SM Mall of Asia Arena	Pasay, Philippines	
119	ONE Hero Series 10	October 28, 2019	—N/a	Beijing, China	
118	ONE: Dawn of Valor	October 25, 2019	Istora Senayan	Jakarta, Indonesia	
117	ONE: Century	October 13, 2019	Ryōgoku Kokugikan	Tokyo, Japan	
116	ONE Warrior Series 8	October 5, 2019	Bellesalle Shibuya Garden	Tokyo, Japan	
115	ONE Hero Series 9	September 23, 2019	—N/a	Beijing, China	
114	ONE: Immortal Triumph	September 6, 2019	Phú Thọ Indoor Stadium	Ho Chi Minh City, Vietnam	
113	ONE Hero Series 8	August 26, 2019	—N/a	Beijing, China	
112	ONE: Dreams of Gold	August 16, 2019	IMPACT Arena	Bangkok, Thailand	
111	ONE Warrior Series 7	August 6, 2019	—N/a	Kallang, Singapore	
110	ONE: Dawn Of Heroes	August 2, 2019	SM Mall of Asia Arena	Pasay, Philippines	
109	ONE Hero Series 7	July 22, 2019	—N/a	Beijing, China	
108	ONE: Masters Of Destiny	July 12, 2019	Axiata Arena	Kuala Lumpur, Malaysia	
107	ONE Warrior Series 6	June 20, 2019	—N/a	Kallang, Singapore	
106	ONE: Legendary Quest	June 15, 2019	Baoshan Arena	Shanghai, China	
105	ONE Hero Series 6	June 14, 2019	—N/a	Shanghai, China	
104	ONE Hero Series 5	May 27, 2019	—N/a	Beijing, China	
103	ONE: Enter the Dragon	May 17, 2019	Singapore Indoor Stadium	Kallang, Singapore	
102	ONE: Warriors Of Light	May 10, 2019	IMPACT Arena	Bangkok, Thailand	
101	ONE: For Honor	May 3, 2019	Istora Senayan	Jakarta, Indonesia	
100	ONE Warrior Series 5	April 25, 2019	—N/a	Kallang, Singapore	
99	ONE Hero Series 4	April 22, 2019	—N/a	Beijing, China	
98	ONE: Roots Of Honor	12 April 2019	SM Mall of Asia Arena	Pasay, Philippines	
97	ONE: A New Era	31 March 2019	Ryōgoku Kokugikan	Tokyo, Japan	
96	ONE Hero Series 3	25 March 2019	—N/a	Beijing, China	
95	ONE: Reign of Valor	8 March 2019	Thuwunna National Indoor Stadium	Yangon, Myanmar	
94	ONE Warrior Series 4	28 February 2019	—N/a	Kallang, Singapore	
93	ONE Hero Series 2	25 February 2019	—N/a	Beijing, China	
92	ONE: Call to Greatness	22 February 2019	Singapore Indoor Stadium	Kallang, Singapore	
91	ONE: Clash of Legends	16 February 2019	IMPACT Arena	Bangkok, Thailand	
90	ONE Hero Series 1	28 January 2019	—N/a	Beijing, China	
89	ONE: Hero's Ascent	25 January 2019	Mall of Asia Arena	Pasay, Philippines	
88	ONE: Eternal Glory	19 January 2019	Istora Senayan	Jakarta, Indonesia	
87	ONE: Destiny of Champions	7 December 2018	Axiata Arena	Kuala Lumpur, Malaysia	
86	ONE: Conquest of Champions	23 November 2018	SM Mall of Asia Arena	Pasay, Philippines	
85	ONE: Warrior's Dream	17 November 2018	Istora Senayan	Jakarta, Indonesia	
84	ONE: Heart of the Lion	9 November 2018	Singapore Indoor Stadium	Kallang, Singapore	
83	ONE: Pursuit of Greatness	26 October 2018	Thuwunna Indoor Stadium	Yangon, Myanmar	
82	ONE Warrior Series 3	11 October 2018	Big Box	Jurong, Singapore	
81	ONE: Kingdom of Heroes	6 October 2018	Impact Arena	Bangkok, Thailand	
80	ONE: Conquest of Heroes	22 September 2018	Jakarta Convention Center	Jakarta, Indonesia	
79	ONE: Beyond the Horizon	8 September 2018	Baoshan Arena	Shanghai, China	
78	ONE: Reign of Kings	27 July 2018	SM Mall of Asia Arena	Pasay, Philippines	
77	ONE Warrior Series 2	19 July 2018	Big Box	Jurong, Singapore	
76	ONE: Pursuit of Power	13 July 2018	Axiata Arena	Kuala Lumpur, Malaysia	
75	ONE: Battle for the Heavens	7 July 2018	Tianhe Gymnasium	Guangzhou, China	
74	ONE: Spirit of a Warrior	29 June 2018	Thuwunna Indoor Stadium	Yangon, Myanmar	
73	ONE: Pinnacle of Power	23 June 2018	Olympic Sports Center	Beijing, China	
72	ONE: Unstoppable Dreams	18 May 2018	Singapore Indoor Stadium	Kallang, Singapore	
71	ONE: Grit and Glory	12 May 2018	Jakarta Convention Center	Jakarta, Indonesia	
70	ONE: Heroes of Honor	20 April 2018	SM Mall of Asia Arena	Pasay, Philippines	
69	ONE Warrior Series 1	31 March 2018	Big Box	Jurong, Singapore	
68	ONE: Iron Will	24 March 2018	Impact Arena	Bangkok, Thailand	
67	ONE: Visions of Victory	9 March 2018	Axiata Arena	Kuala Lumpur, Malaysia	
66	ONE: Quest for Gold	23 February 2018	Thuwunna Indoor Stadium	Yangon, Myanmar	
65	ONE: Global Superheroes	26 January 2018	SM Mall of Asia Arena	Pasay, Philippines	
64	ONE: Kings of Courage	20 January 2018	Jakarta Convention Center	Jakarta, Indonesia	
63	ONE: Warriors of the World	9 December 2017	Impact Arena	Bangkok, Thailand	
62	ONE: Immortal Pursuit	24 November 2017	Singapore Indoor Stadium	Kallang, Singapore	
61	ONE: Legends of the World	10 November 2017	SM Mall of Asia Arena	Pasay, Philippines	
60	ONE: Hero's Dream	3 November 2017	Thuwunna Indoor Stadium	Yangon, Myanmar	
59	ONE: Total Victory	16 September 2017	Jakarta Convention Center	Jakarta, Indonesia	
58	ONE: Shanghai	2 September 2017	Shanghai Oriental Sports Center	Shanghai, China	
57	ONE: Quest for Greatness	18 August 2017	Stadium Negara	Kuala Lumpur, Malaysia	
56	ONE: Kings and Conquerors	12 August 2017	Cotai Arena, The Venetian Macao	Macau, SAR, China	
55	ONE: Light of a Nation	30 June 2017	Thuwunna Indoor Stadium	Yangon, Myanmar	
54	ONE: Dynasty Of Heroes	26 May 2017	Singapore Indoor Stadium	Kallang, Singapore	
53	ONE: Kings of Destiny	21 April 2017	SM Mall of Asia Arena	Pasay, Philippines	
52	ONE: Warrior Kingdom	11 March 2017	Impact Arena	Bangkok, Thailand	
51	ONE: Throne of Tigers	10 February 2017	Stadium Negara	Kuala Lumpur, Malaysia	
50	ONE: Quest for Power	14 January 2017	Jakarta Convention Center	Jakarta, Indonesia	
49	ONE: Age of Domination	2 December 2016	SM Mall of Asia Arena	Pasay, Philippines	
48	ONE: Defending Honor	11 November 2016	Singapore Indoor Stadium	Kallang, Singapore	
47	ONE: State of Warriors	7 October 2016	Thuwunna Indoor Stadium	Yangon, Myanmar	
46	ONE: Unbreakable Warriors	2 September 2016	Stadium Negara	Kuala Lumpur, Malaysia	
45	ONE: Titles and Titans	27 August 2016	Jakarta Convention Center	Jakarta, Indonesia	
44	ONE: Heroes of the World	13 August 2016	Cotai Arena, The Venetian Macao	Macau, SAR, China	
43	ONE: Dynasty of Champions (Anhui)	2 July 2016	Hefei Olympic Sports Center Stadium	Anhui, China	
42	ONE: Kingdom of Champions	27 May 2016	Impact Arena	Bangkok, Thailand	
41	ONE: Ascent to Power	6 May 2016	Singapore Indoor Stadium	Kallang, Singapore	
40	ONE: Global Rivals	15 April 2016	SM Mall of Asia Arena	Pasay, Philippines	
39	ONE: Union of Warriors	18 March 2016	Thuwunna National Indoor Stadium	Yangon, Myanmar	
38	ONE: Tribe of Warriors	20 February 2016	Istora Senayan	Jakarta, Indonesia	9,683
37	ONE: Clash of Heroes	29 January 2016	Stadium Negara	Kuala Lumpur, Malaysia	8,492
36	ONE: Dynasty of Champions (Changsha)	23 January 2016	Changsha SWC Stadium	Changsha, China	3,856
35	ONE: Spirit of Champions	11 December 2015	SM Mall of Asia Arena	Pasay, Philippines	18,892
34	ONE: Kingdom of Khmer	5 December 2015	Koh Pich Theatre	Phnom Penh, Cambodia	3,789
33	ONE: Dynasty of Champions (Beijing II)	21 November 2015	Olympic Sports Center Gymnasium	Beijing, China	6,491
32	ONE: Pride of Lions	13 November 2015	Singapore Indoor Stadium	Kallang, Singapore	11,611
31	ONE: Tigers of Asia	9 October 2015	Putra Indoor Stadium	Kuala Lumpur, Malaysia	11,378
30	ONE: Odyssey of Champions	27 September 2015	Istora Senayan	Jakarta, Indonesia	8,485
–	ONE: Dynasty of Champions (Shanghai)	17 September 2015	Mercedes-Benz Arena	Shanghai, China	Cancelled
29	ONE: Kingdom of Warriors	18 July 2015	Thuwunna Indoor Stadium	Yangon, Myanmar	4,684
28	ONE: Dynasty of Champions (Guangzhou)	20 June 2015	Guangzhou Tianhe Gymnasium	Guangzhou, China	8,301
27	ONE: Warrior's Quest	22 May 2015	Singapore Indoor Stadium	Kallang, Singapore	11,485
26	ONE: Valor of Champions	24 April 2015	SM Mall of Asia Arena	Pasay, Philippines	17,589
25	ONE: Age of Champions	13 March 2015	Putra Indoor Stadium	Kuala Lumpur, Malaysia	10,367
24	ONE FC: Dynasty of Champions (Beijing)	19 December 2014	Olympic Sports Center Gymnasium	Beijing, China	5,371
23	ONE FC: Warrior's Way	5 December 2014	SM Mall of Asia Arena	Pasay, Philippines	16,945
22	ONE FC: Battle of the Lions	7 November 2014	Singapore Indoor Stadium	Kallang, Singapore	11,284
21	ONE FC: Roar of the Tigers	17 October 2014	Putra Indoor Stadium	Kuala Lumpur, Malaysia	9,839
20	ONE FC: Rise of the Kingdom	12 September 2014	Koh Pich Theatre	Phnom Penh, Cambodia	2,745
19	ONE FC: Reign of Champions	29 August 2014	Dubai World Trade Centre	Dubai, United Arab Emirates	5,693
18	ONE FC: War of Dragons	11 July 2014	National Taiwan University Sports Center	Taipei, Taiwan	4,007
17	ONE FC: Era of Champions	14 June 2014	Mata Elang International Stadium	Jakarta, Indonesia	8,125
16	ONE FC: Honor and Glory	30 May 2014	Singapore Indoor Stadium	Kallang, Singapore	11,001
15	ONE FC: Rise of Heroes	2 May 2014	SM Mall of Asia Arena	Pasay, Philippines	15,847
14	ONE FC: War of Nations	14 March 2014	Stadium Negara	Kuala Lumpur, Malaysia	7,536
13	ONE FC: Moment of Truth	6 December 2013	SM Mall of Asia Arena	Pasay, Philippines	13,398
12	ONE FC: Warrior Spirit	15 November 2013	Putra Indoor Stadium	Kuala Lumpur, Malaysia	7,041
11	ONE FC: Total Domination	18 October 2013	Singapore Indoor Stadium	Kallang, Singapore	10,535
10	ONE FC: Champions & Warriors	13 September 2013	Istora Senayan	Jakarta, Indonesia	5,264
9	ONE FC: Rise to Power	31 May 2013	SM Mall of Asia Arena	Pasay, Philippines	12,872
8	ONE FC: Kings and Champions	5 April 2013	Singapore Indoor Stadium	Kallang, Singapore	9,017
7	ONE FC: Return of Warriors	2 February 2013	Putra Indoor Stadium	Kuala Lumpur, Malaysia	6,376
6	ONE FC: Rise of Kings	6 October 2012	Singapore Indoor Stadium	Kallang, Singapore	8,232
5	ONE FC: Pride of a Nation	31 August 2012	Smart Araneta Coliseum	Quezon City, Philippines	12,523
4	ONE FC: Destiny of Warriors	23 June 2012	Stadium Negara	Kuala Lumpur, Malaysia	6,153
3	ONE FC: War of the Lions	31 March 2012	Singapore Indoor Stadium	Kallang, Singapore	7,714
2	ONE FC: Battle of Heroes	11 February 2012	The BritAma Arena	North Jakarta, Indonesia	3,371
1	ONE Fighting Championship 1: Champion vs. Champion	3 September 2011	Singapore Indoor Stadium	Kallang, Singapore	6,789

== Event locations ==
The following cities have hosted a total of 347 ONE Championship and ONE Friday Fights events as of ONE 173

- Thailand (163)
  - Bangkok (163)
- Singapore (80)
  - Kallang (77)
  - Jurong (3)
- China (27)
  - Beijing (17)
  - Shanghai (4)
  - Guangzhou (2)
  - Macau, SAR (2)
  - Anhui (1)
  - Changsha (1)
- Philippines (22)
  - Pasay (21)
  - Quezon City (1)
- Malaysia (18)
  - Kuala Lumpur (18)
- Indonesia (17)
  - Jakarta (16)
- Myanmar (9)
  - Yangon (9)
- Japan (6)
  - Tokyo (5)
  - Saitama (1)
- Cambodia (2)
  - Phnom Penh (2)
- Qatar (2)
  - Lusail (2)
- Taiwan (1)
  - Taipei (1)
- United Arab Emirates (1)
  - Abu Dhabi (1)
- United States (3)
  - Broomfield, Colorado (1)
  - Denver, Colorado (2)
- Vietnam (2)
  - Ho Chi Minh City (2)
