= ONE 173 =

Combat sport events in 2025

ONE 173: Superbon vs. Noiri
- The poster for ONE 173: Superbon vs. Noiri
- Promotion: ONE Championship
- Date: November 16, 2025
- Venue: Ariake Arena
- City: Tokyo, Japan

Event chronology
ONE Fight Night 37	ONE 173: Superbon vs. Noiri	ONE Fight Night 38

ONE 173: Superbon vs. Noiri was a combat sports event produced by ONE Championship that took place on November 16, 2025, at the Ariake Arena in Tokyo, Japan.

== Background ==
The event was marked the promotion's fifth visit to Tokyo and first since ONE 165 in January 2024. This event was originally expected to take place in Denver, Colorado, United States on August 1. However, due to Stamp Fairtex's setback in her recovery from knee surgery against Denice Zamboanga and the fact that several other targeted title fights did not come together for the event, therefore the event in Denver will be postpone to June 26, 2026, instead.

A ONE Featherweight Kickboxing World Championship unification bout between current two-time champion Superbon Singha Mawynn and interim champion (also a former K-1 Super Lightweight and Welterweight Champion) Masaaki Noiri headlined the event.

A ONE Heavyweight World Championship rematch between current champion Oumar Kane and former champion (also current ONE Middleweight and Light Heavyweight World champion) Anatoly Malykhin was scheduled to serve as the co-main event. The pairing previously met at ONE 169 in November 2024, which Kane captured the title by split decision. However, Kane was forced to withdraw after being involved in a car accident.

A middleweight submission grappling bout between former Bellator Middleweight World Champion Rafael Lovato Jr. and Giancarlo Bodoni is scheduled to take place at this event. The match was originally scheduled at this event on August 1, in Denver, but the match was cancelled after the event in Denver was postponed to 2026.

A ONE Flyweight World Championship bout between current champion Yuya Wakamatsu and current ONE Strawweight World Champion Joshua Pacio served on this event.

In addition, a ONE Women's Atomweight World Championship bout between current champion Denice Zamboanga and Ayaka Miura was scheduled to serve on this event. However, Zamboanga withdrew due to suffered as medical issue reasons.

A ONE Flyweight Muay Thai World Championship bout for the vacant title between former champion Rodtang Jitmuangnon and former ONE Bantamweight Muay Thai World Champion Nong-O Hama was scheduled to serve as the event. The bout was cancelled because Rodtang withdrew due to poor physical condition soon after his weigh-in and hydration test.

An inaugural ONE Atomweight Muay Thai World Championship bout between Nadaka Yoshinari and Numsurin Chor.Ketwina served as the event.

A ONE Lightweight World Championship rematch between current champion (also current ONE Welterweight World champion) Christian Lee and Alibeg Rasulov served as the event.The pairing previously met at ONE Fight Night 26 in December 2024, where the bout ended in a no contest due to an accidental eye poke rendered Rasulov unable to continue during the second round.

A ONE Bantamweight Muay Thai World Championship bout between current champion Nabil Anane and former champion (also former ONE Flyweight Muay Thai and current Bantamweight Kickboxing World Champion) Jonathan Haggerty was scheduled to serve as the event.However, Haggerty withdrew due to surffered as injury, and the bout was instead he had replaced by Hiromi Wajima for the featherweight Kickboxing bout.

== Results ==
Fight card (PPV at Watch ONE)
Weight class				Method	Round	Time	Notes
Featherweight Kickboxing	Superbon Singha Mawynn (c)	def.	Masaaki Noiri (ic)	Decision (unanimous) (48–47, 49–47, 49–46)	5	3:00	(Note: For the ONE Featherweight Kickboxing World Championship.)
Flyweight	Yuya Wakamatsu (c)	def.	Joshua Pacio	TKO (knees)	2	0:54	(Note: For the ONE Flyweight World Championship.)
Atomweight Muay Thai	Nadaka Yoshinari	def.	Numsurin Chor.Ketwina	Decision (unanimous) (50–45, 50–45, 50–45)	5	3:00	(Note: For the inaugural ONE Atomweight Muay Thai World Championship.)
Lightweight	Christian Lee (c)	def.	Alibeg Rasulov	TKO (knees)	2	2:32	(Note: For the ONE Lightweight World Championship.)
Flyweight Kickboxing	Takeru Segawa	def.	Denis Purić	TKO (head kicks and punches)	2	2:49
Featherweight Kickboxing	Marat Grigorian	def.	Rukiya Anpo	Decision (unanimous)	3	3:00	(Note: Anpo missed weight (155.4 lb).)
Bantamweight Kickboxing	Yuki Yoza	def.	Superlek Kiatmuu9	Decision (unanimous) (29–28, 30–27, 30–27)	3	3:00
Featherweight Kickboxing	Nabil Anane	def.	Hiromi Wajima	Decision (unanimous)	3	3:00
Women's Atomweight Kickboxing	Kana Morimoto	def.	Stamp Fairtex	Decision (unanimous)	3	3:00
Lightweight	Tye Ruotolo	def.	Shozo Isojima	Submission (rear-naked choke)	1	2:26
Middleweight Submission Grappling	Rafael Lovato Jr.	def.	Giancarlo Bodoni	Decision (unanimous)	1	10:00
Bantamweight Muay Thai	Suakim Sor.Jor.Tongprajin	def.	Jake Peacock	TKO (punch)	3	0:26
Heavyweight	Shamil Erdogan	def.	Ryugo Takeuchi	TKO (punches)	1	2:20
Lightweight	Hiroyuki Tetsuka	def.	Shinya Aoki	TKO (punches and knees)	2	0:28
Preliminary card (YouTube / Watch ONE)
Women's Atomweight	Chihiro Sawada	def.	Itsuki Hirata	Decision (unanimous)	3	5:00
Bantamweight Kickboxing	Hiroki Akimoto	def.	Wei Rui	Decision (unanimous)	3	3:00

== Bonus awards ==
The following fighters received $50,000 bonuses:

- Performance of the Night: Yuya Wakamatsu, Christian Lee, Tye Ruotolo, Suakim Sor.Jor.Tongprajin and Takeru Segawa

== See also ==
- 2025 in ONE Championship
- List of ONE Championship events
- List of current ONE fighters
- ONE Championship Rankings
