= Indiabulls =

Listed Indian financial services conglomerate

Indiabulls Limited
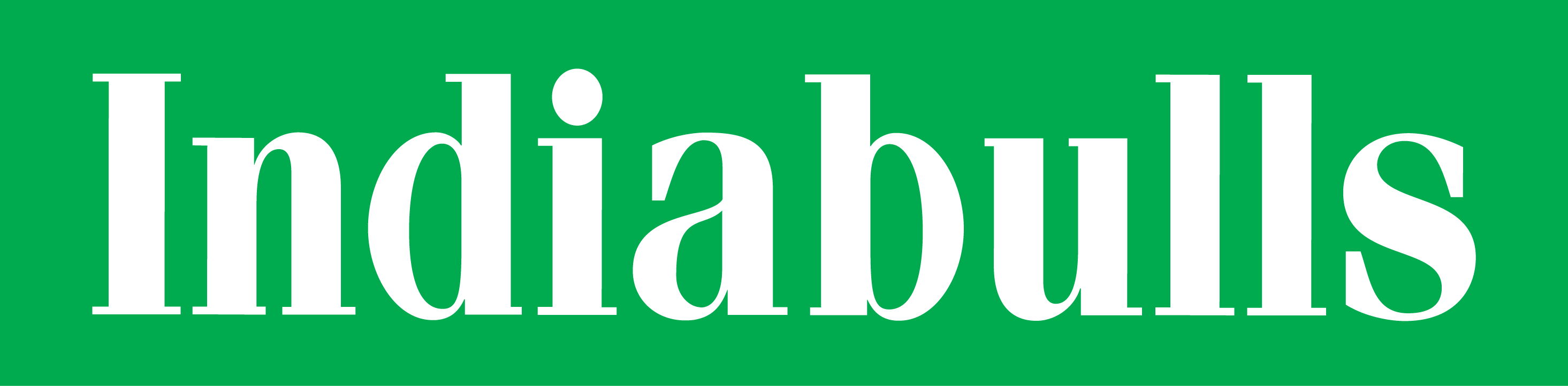

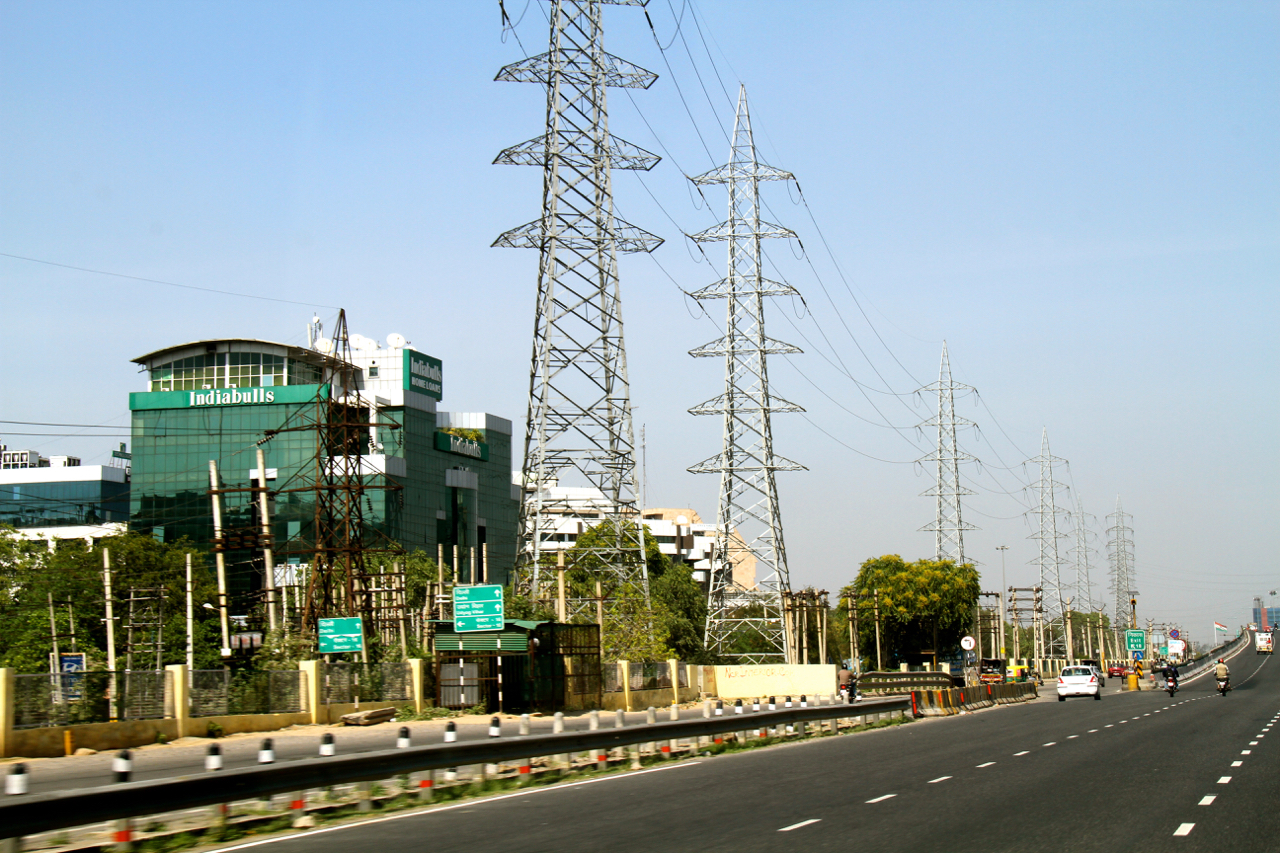
- Indiabulls Gurgaon HQ
- Type: Public
- Industry: Conglomerate
- Founded: 24 July 2007
- Headquarters: Indiabulls House, Udyog Vihar, Gurgaon, Haryana, India
- Key people: Mr. Sameer Gehlaut (Promoter), Mr Gurbans Singh (Executive Chairman), Mr Divyesh Shah (Executive Director)
- Services: Real Estate; Financial services Construction Equipment leasing
- Revenue: Rs 462.4 cr
- Website: www.indiabulls.com

Old logo of Indiabulls

Indiabulls Limited is an Indian publicly listed company headquartered in Gurgaon, with operations in real estate development, financial services, and construction equipment leasing. The company was formed in its current structure on 14 October 2025, following a National Company Law Tribunal (NCLT)-approved scheme of arrangement that merged 17 entities — including Dhani Services Limited and Indiabulls Enterprises Limited — into the formerly listed Yaari Digital Integrated Services Limited, which was subsequently renamed Indiabulls Limited.

== History ==
Indiabulls was started in 2000 with the establishment of Indiabulls Financial Services, a stockbroking firm co-founded by three IIT Delhi graduates–Sameer Gehlaut, Rajiv Rattan and Saurabh Mittal. Indiabulls Financial Services subsequently set up subsidiaries in stockbroking, consumer finance, housing finance and real estate, among others.

In 2004, Indiabulls Financial Services became a publicly-listed company after its initial public offering. Indiabulls Real Estate was demerged from the company in 2006, and Indiabulls Securities in 2008.

In 2013, Indiabulls Financial Services reverse merged with its wholly owned subsidiary, Indiabulls Housing Finance, to form the flagship company of the group.

In 2014, the group was split between the three promoters with Sameer Gehlaut retaining management control over Indiabulls Housing Finance, Indiabulls Real Estate, Indiabulls Securities and Indiabulls Wholesale Services, while Rajiv Rattan and Saurabh Mittal obtained control of Indiabulls Power (renamed RattanIndia Power) and Indiabulls Infrastructure (renamed RattanIndia Infrastructure).

By 2017, Indiabulls Housing Finance had become the second-largest housing finance company in India and was included in the NIFTY 50 benchmark index. However, between late 2018 and 2019, its shares and bonds experienced a sharp decline in value due to a credit market crisis triggered by the collapse of IL&FS, the company's shrinking balance sheet, allegations of fraud by group promoters, and a proposed merger with the beleaguered Lakshmi Vilas Bank, which fell through.

In 2020, the group announced that it would exit Indiabulls Real Estate in a merger deal with Embassy Group entities. Sameer Gehlaut stepped down as the chairman of Indiabulls Housing Finance in 2020 and ceased to be its promoter in 2023. In July 2024, Indiabulls Housing Finance was renamed as Sammaan Capital, while Indiabulls Real Estate was renamed as Equinox India Developments.

In 2025, Dhani Services Limited and Indiabulls Enterprises Limited were merged into Yaari Digital Integrated Services Limited, which was subsequently renamed Indiabulls Limited.

== Group companies ==
Indiabulls Limited, which was created in 2025 as a result of the merger of:

- Dhani Services (formerly Indiabulls Ventures or Indiabulls Securities)
- Indiabulls Enterprises (including Indiabulls Store One and Indiabulls LED)
- Yaari Digital Integrated Services (formerly Indiabulls Integrated Services or Indiabulls Wholesale Services)
- Indiabulls Asset Reconstruction Company Limited
- TranServ Limited

=== Real estate development ===
The company is engaged in developing residential and commercial projects across Mumbai, the National Capital Region (NCR), and Ludhiana.

In 2026, the company entered into a joint venture with a private land-owning entity for the development of a premium commercial project on approximately 2.38 acres of land located in Sector 103, Gurgaon, along the Dwarka Expressway.

Their real estate segment maintains a development pipeline of 140.65 lakh square feet across owned and joint venture projects.

== Financial Services ==
The financial services vertical is operated through the company’s subsidiaries and includes:

=== Stock Broking ===
Indiabulls Securities Limited, a wholly owned subsidiary, provides equity, commodity, and currency broking services along with depository participant services.

=== Asset Reconstruction (ARC) ===
The ARC business acquires stressed asset portfolios from banks and NBFCs. Total assets under collection stand at approximately ₹3,800 crore.

=== Digital Payments (UPI/Wallet) ===
The company operates a digital wallet (Dhani Pay) and is transitioning to TPAP-enabled UPI services, with regulatory certification underway.

=== SMB Platform (Spring Cash) ===
Indiabulls Limited holds a 16.4% stake in Spring Cash LLC, USA, a small and medium business lending platform.

=== NBFC ===
Dhani Loans and Services Limited, a subsidiary, operates as a non-banking financial company offering personal loans, small business loans and credit line products to retail consumers and small businesses through digital platforms.
