= Saurabh Mittal =

Indian businessman

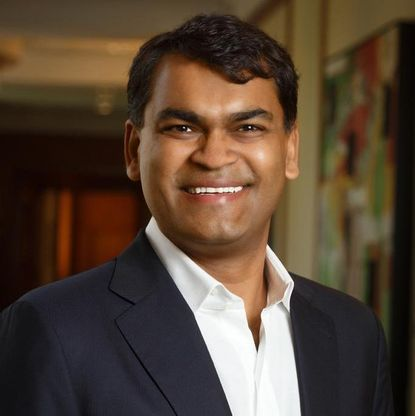
- Born: 1973 (age 52–53); India
- Education: Harvard Business School
- Alma mater: Indian Institute of Technology
- Occupations: Founder and Chairman of Mission Holdings; Chairman of Incedo Inc.; Vice Chairman of ONE Championship

Saurabh Mittal (born 1973) is a Singapore-based Indian businessman, entrepreneur, investor, and philanthropist. He is the founder and chairman of Mission Holdings, a private investment holding company.

== Education ==
Mittal attended the Indian Institute of Technology in Delhi for a BS in Electrical engineering, where he was the Best Graduating Student. Mittal also holds an MBA from Harvard Business School and graduated as a Baker Scholar.

== Career ==
In 1999, Mittal co-founded Indiabulls, a financial services and real estate conglomerate in India, with his undergraduate classmates from the Indian Institute of Technology. He served as Vice chairman of its board of directors until he stepped down in 2014.

He later joined Farallon Capital as an investment associate in 2001 before he became a full partner at Noonday Capital, an affiliate of Farallon, in 2005. Mittal left both Farallon and Noonday in 2011.

While studying for his MBA at Harvard Business School, Mittal befriended Chatri Sityodtong, and the pair later established martial arts promotion ONE Championship in 2011. Mittal was appointed Vice Chairman of the company in 2018.

In 2011, Mittal founded Incedo Inc. with operating partners to focus on data and analytics in the US. In 2017, Nitin Seth took over from Mittal as Chief Executive Officer of Incedo, while Mittal remained as chairman.

In 2014, Mittal set up Mission Holdings, a private investment holding company with a focus on financial services, media, real estate, and technology, and he is its chairman and sole shareholder.

In 2022, Mittal was ranked as the 46th richest person in Singapore with a net worth of US$900 million.

== Philanthropy ==
Mittal has served on Harvard Business School's Advisory Board, is a Founder and Trustee of Plaksha University, and is a Founder and Board Member of the IIT Delhi Endowment Fund. He is also member of the governing body of Parivaar, a charitable organization focused on the care and development of highly-vulnerable children, and a member of the Founder's Circle of Avasara Academy, a school dedicated to developing young Indian women. In 2020, Mittal donated RS. 10 Crore towards building the Mittal Sports Centre at IIT Delhi.

== Personal life ==
Mittal has three children.

== Honors ==
Distinguished Alumnus Award 2017, Indian Institute of Technology, Delhi.

== See also ==
- Indiabulls
- Chatri Sityodtong
- ONE Championship
