= Dhani (company) =

Indian Financial technology company

Dhani Services Limited
- Type: Public company
- Traded as: BSE: 532960; NSE: DHANI
- ISIN: INE274G01010
- Industry: Financial technology; Healthcare; E-commerce; Information technology; Retail
- Founded: 1995
- Headquarters: New Delhi, India
- Area served: India
- Key people: Sameer Gehlaut
- Products: Medicine supply; Healthcare products; Telemedicine
- Services: Online wallet; Stock broking
- Owner: Sameer Gehlaut
- Number of employees: 10000+ (2021)
- Subsidiaries: Dhani Loans & Services Limited; Dhani Stocks Limited; Dhani Healthcare Limited
- Website: www.dhani.com

Dhani is an Indian software company. Its app provides digital financial and healthcare services.

== History ==
The company was founded by Sameer Gehlaut in 1995, as Indiabulls Ventures Limited which was later renamed Dhani Services Limited in October 2020 to accommodate the consumer business of the Indiabulls Group under one brand name. In 2017, one of its subsidiaries, Indiabulls Consumer Finance Limited launched an app-based lending platform primarily focused on the personal loans' domain. In October 2020, the subsidiary also adopted a new name as Dhani Loans & Services Limited. Another subsidiary, Indiabulls Securities Limited adopted a new name Dhani Stocks Limited in 2020 and a new company Dhani Healthcare Limited was incorporated to offer telemedicine and online pharmacy services.

=== Funding ===
In October 2020, Dhani raised ₹1.47 billion by issuing 8.4 million shares to New York-based NWI Management. In October 2020, the company raised ₹12 billion from General Catalyst Partners, Think Investments, Ribbit Capital, First Royalty Ventures, and the founder Sameer Gehlaut.

== Services ==
Dhani's super app combines an online wallet with buy now, pay later facility plus a subscription fee & primary healthcare services under OneFreedom. In Dhani OneFreedom's subscription business model, depending on how much credit limit the customer is granted irrespective of the actual limit utilization, the interest charged on it which is termed a monthly subscription exponentially rises. In its gamified ecosystem, customers use multiple products within the app to perform mobile recharge, loan repayments, and insurance payments. The platform now also offers direct investments in stocks listed on Bombay Stock Exchange and National Stock Exchange of India.

In 2020, the company integrated online pharmacy with its super app. Within it Dhani Doctor, a telemedicine service including instant video consultations with in-house doctors was added.

In 2021, Dhani's super-app was rated as one of the best personal loan applications in India by The New Indian Express.

== Controversies ==
- In November 2023 Times of India news report, a man from Kalamboli was allegedly defrauded of Rs 90,000 by a cybercriminal while attempting to secure a loan through the Dhani Finance App.
- In mid-February 2022, many non-users reported that they have faced issues over the misuse of their permanent account number details by unknown third parties on the Dhani app to avail loans without their consent and knowledge. Complainants said their credit scores were harmed because credit reports displayed loans they never took as defaults.
- In April 2021, many non-users of the Dhani app received a text message to pay for a loan that was never taken by them. The company later apologised to its users for this tech glitch.
- In December 2020 Times of India news report, it was revealed that women doctors on various Indian online doctor consultation portals face "sexual harassment" from patients. At that time, the company "expressed inability" to issue any "formal statement".
- In 2019, Securities and Exchange Board of India impounded ₹8720,000 from the former non-executive director of the company and her husband in an insider trading case. Together, they possessed unpublished price-sensitive information that they used to trade the stocks in 2017–2019.
