= The Apprentice: ONE Championship Edition =

- No. of contestants: 16
- Winner: Jessica Ramella
- No. of episodes: 13

Release
- Original network: Netflix; AXN Asia (Brunei, Cambodia, China, Hong Kong, Indonesia, Macau, Malaysia, Myanmar, Philippines, Singapore, Sri Lanka, Taiwan, Thailand, Vietnam); Ixigua/TikTok (China); One Sports (Philippines); Kompas TV (Indonesia); Amarin TV/LINE TV (Thailand); MeWATCH (Singapore); AbemaTV (Japan); HTV Sport (Vietnam)
- Original release: 18 March 2021 – present

Additional information
- Filming dates: September 2020 – November 2020

The Apprentice: ONE Championship Edition is a reality television program that premiered in Asia on 18 March 2021 and concluded on 10 June 2021. On 3 December 2021, the show won two major categories at the 2021 Asian Academy Creative Awards for Best Non-Scripted Entertainment and Best Adaptation of an Existing Format. It began broadcasting worldwide in June 2021. Although the series was filmed in Asia, it has no relation to The Apprentice Asia, and it is the first-ever global edition of The Apprentice co-owned by MGM and ONE Championship. On 1 February 2022, it became the first version of the franchise to stream on Netflix in over 150 countries.

The show features 16 candidates from around the world competing in both business and physical challenges. CEOs from major companies and prominent mixed martial artists will also guest star on the show. The finale is won by Venezuelan sales director Jessica Ramella, who won a US$250,000 job offer to work directly under ONE Chairman and CEO Chatri Sityodtong for a year as his protégé (and as a member of chief of staff) in Singapore.

On 21 June 2021, Sityodtong greenlit a second season of the show, expecting newer challengers.

== Summary ==
The series is hosted by Chatri Sityodtong, Chairman and CEO of ONE Championship. Sityodtong is joined by Niharika Singh, ONE's Senior Vice President of Corporate Development and Strategy, and Dominic "Dom" Lau, ONE Championship's ring announcer, who serves as taskmaster, and also analyzed each contestant's performance during the task for both Business and Physical tasks, respectively. This edition marked three firsts in The Apprentice franchise: one that that featured two tasks airing in a single episode (until Episode 10); only one person, Singh, analyses each contestant's performance during the business task, instead of the usual two; and also, the first time two teams were dissolved and merged as a single team.

These physical tasks are designed to test each teams' heart and endurance and are often supervised by popular figures from the martial arts world, such as Georges St-Pierre, Demetrious Johnson, Rich Franklin, Angela Lee, Renzo Gracie, and Ben Askren. The winning teams of each week's physical task will receive some advantages on business tasks.

Each team will then pick a project manager for the episode's business task portion. They must impress Sityodtong, Singh, and the week's guest advisor – which includes the likes of Eric Yuan, founder and CEO of Zoom; Anthony Tan, co-founder and group CEO of Grab; and Ankiti Bose, co-founder and CEO of Zilingo – with their pitches.

The board decides which team showed superior business acumen and won the challenge. The project manager and two members from the losing team then face Sityodtong and Singh in the boardroom, where they are up for elimination from the show. Like The New Celebrity Apprentice and some foreign editions which does not use the traditional catchphrase of "you're fired" for the contestant's elimination, Sityodtong declared the candidate that he or she is "not the ONE", referencing the company's theme of ONE Championship.

The show was announced on 20 February 2020 and auditions began in March. The show initially slated for a premiere on the latter half, but due to the ongoing COVID-19 pandemic at the time of filming, production commenced from September to November 2020 in accordance with health and safety protocols. The season was shot entirely in Singapore, primarily at Andaz Singapore near DUO for business tasks and boardroom, and other places across Singapore during physical tasks.

== Season 1 Candidates ==
Contestant	Background	Age	Origin	Original team	Result
Jessica Ramella	Sales Director	31	Venezuela	Valor	Hired by Chatri (06–10–2021)
Louie Sangalang	Procurement Consultant	43	Philippines	Valor	Fired in the season finale (06–10–2021)
Irina Chadsey	Investment Consultant	29	Russia	Valor	Fired in week 11 (05–27–2021)
Monica Millington	Fashion Entrepreneur	30	United States	Valor	Fired in week 11 (05–27–2021)
Paulina Purnomowati	Retail Country Manager	41	Indonesia	Conquest	Fired in week 10 (05–20–2021)
Kexin Ye	Entrepreneur	27	Germany	Valor	Fired in week 9 (05–13–2021)
Nazee Sajedi	Aviation Consultant	37	United States	Conquest	Fired in week 9 (05–13–2021)
Niraj Puran Rao	Entrepreneur	26	India	Conquest	Fired in week 8 (05–06–2021)
Eugene Chung	Digital Marketer	23	United States	Conquest	Fired in week 7 (04–29–2021)
Clinton Tudor	App Developer	44	New Zealand	Valor	Fired in week 6 (04–22–2021)
Joy Koh	Gymnastics Instructor	36	Singapore	Conquest	Fired in week 5 (04–15–2021)
Sho Takei	HR Manager	28	Japan	Valor	Fired in week 4 (04–08–2021)
Teirra Kamolvattanavith	Journalist	27	Thailand	Valor	Fired in week 4 (04–08–2021)
Lara Pearl Alvarez	Accountant	24	Philippines	Conquest	Fired in week 3 (04–01–2021)
Roman Wilson	Investment Banker	29	United States	Conquest	Fired in week 2 (03–25–2021)
Alvin Ang	Sport Entrepreneur	24	Singapore	Conquest	Fired in week 2 (03–25–2021)

== Season 1 results ==
Candidate	Original team	Week 3 team	Week 4 team	Week 5 team	Week 7 team	Week 8 team	Week 10 team	Application result	Record as project manager
Jessica	Valor	Conquest	Conquest	Conquest	Conquest	Conquest	Dream Team	Hired by Chatri	1-0 (won week 7)
Louie	Valor	Valor	Valor	Valor	Valor	Valor	Dream Team	Fired in the season finale	2-0 (won week 2 & 6)
Irina	Valor	Valor	Valor	Valor	Conquest	Conquest	Dream Team	Fired (Week 11)	1-1 (lost week 4, won week 8)
Monica	Valor	Valor	Valor	Valor	Valor	Valor	Dream Team	Fired (Week 11)	2-0 (won week 5 & 9)
Paulina	Conquest	Conquest	Conquest	Valor	Valor	Valor	Dream Team	Fired (Week 10)	1-2 (won week 3, lost week 8 & 10)
Kexin	Valor	Conquest	Conquest	Conquest	Conquest	Conquest		Fired (Week 9)	1-1 (won week 4, lost week 9)
Nazee	Conquest	Conquest	Conquest	Conquest	Conquest	Conquest		Fired (Week 9)	0-1 (lost week 1)
Niraj	Conquest	Conquest	Conquest	Conquest	Conquest	Valor		Fired (Week 8)	0-1 (lost week 6)
Eugene	Conquest	Conquest	Valor	Valor	Valor			Fired (Week 7)	0-2 (lost week 2 & 7)
Clinton	Valor	Valor	Conquest	Conquest				Fired (Week 6)	1-0 (won week 1)
Joy	Conquest	Conquest	Conquest	Conquest				Fired (Week 5)	0-1 (lost week 5)
Sho	Valor	Valor	Valor					Fired (Week 4)	0-1 (lost week 3)
Teirra	Valor	Valor	Valor					Fired (Week 4)	
Lara	Conquest	Valor						Fired (Week 3)	
Alvin	Conquest							Fired (Week 2)	
Roman	Conquest							Fired (Week 2)	

== Season 1 Physical task results ==
In a history first for The Apprentice franchise, candidates had to undergo a preliminary task called Physical tasks which assess on the candidate's abilities and teamwork. The list shows only the results as part of the team. The list do not include task 10 onward due to the merging of two teams on Week 10.

Physical Task results
Candidate	Task Number								
Candidate	1	2	3	4	5	6	7	8	9
Jessica	WIN	WIN	LOSE	WIN	WIN	LOSE	LOSE	LOSE	LOSE
Louie	WIN	WIN	WIN	LOSE	LOSE	WIN	WIN	WIN	WIN
Irina	WIN	WIN	WIN	LOSE	LOSE	WIN	WIN	LOSE	LOSE
Monica	WIN	WIN	WIN	LOSE	LOSE	WIN	WIN	WIN	WIN
Paulina	LOSE	LOSE	LOSE	WIN	WIN	WIN	WIN	WIN	WIN
Kexin	WIN	WIN	LOSE	WIN	WIN	LOSE	LOSE	LOSE	LOSE
Nazee	LOSE	LOSE	LOSE	WIN	WIN	LOSE	LOSE	LOSE	LOSE
Niraj	LOSE	LOSE	LOSE	WIN	WIN	LOSE	LOSE	WIN	
Eugene	LOSE	LOSE	LOSE	WIN	LOSE	WIN	WIN		
Clinton	WIN	WIN	WIN	LOSE	WIN	LOSE			
Joy	LOSE	LOSE	LOSE	WIN	WIN				
Sho	WIN	WIN	WIN	LOSE					
Teirra	WIN	WIN	WIN	LOSE					
Lara	LOSE	LOSE	WIN						
Roman	LOSE	LOSE							
Alvin	LOSE	LOSE							

Color keys

The contestant was part of the winning team.

The contestant was part of the losing team.

The candidate didn't participate in the physical task.

== Season 1 Elimination table ==
Elimination chart
No.	Candidate	Task Number											
No.	Candidate	1	2	3	4	5	6	7	8	9	10	11	12
1	Jessica	IN	IN	IN	IN	IN	IN	WIN	IN	IN	IN	IN	HIRED
2	Louie	IN	WIN	IN	IN	IN	WIN	IN	IN	IN	BR	IN	FIRED
3-4	Irina	IN	IN	IN	LOSE	IN	IN	IN	WIN	BR	BR	FIRED	
3-4	Monica	IN	IN	IN	IN	WIN	IN	IN	BR	WIN	IN	FIRED	
5	Paulina	IN	IN	WIN	IN	IN	IN	IN	LOSE	IN	FIRED		
6-7	Kexin	IN	IN	IN	WIN	BR	IN	IN	IN	FIRED			
6-7	Nazee	LOSE	IN	IN	IN	IN	BR	IN	IN	FIRED			
8	Niraj	IN	IN	IN	IN	IN	LOSE	IN	FIRED				
9	Eugene	IN	LOSE	IN	IN	IN	IN	FIRED					
10	Clinton	WIN	IN	BR	IN	BR	FIRED						
11	Joy	IN	IN	IN	IN	FIRED							
12-13	Sho	IN	IN	LOSE	FIRED								
12-13	Teirra	IN	IN	IN	FIRED								
14	Lara	BR	IN	FIRED									
15-16	Roman	IN	FIRED										
15-16	Alvin	BR	FIRED										

Color keys

- The contestant was hired as "the ONE" and won the competition.
- The contestant won as project manager.
- The contestant lost as project manager.
- The contestant was on the winning team.
- The contestant was a member of the losing team.
- The contestant was brought to the final boardroom.
- The contestant was fired/named not "the ONE".
- The contestant lost as project manager and was fired/named not "the ONE".

== Season 1 Recap ==
=== Episode 1: The Home Coming ===
- Air date: 18 March 2021
- Tasks
  - Physical Task: Teams competed in a relay starting with a run followed by a series of obstacle courses, which tested their speed, endurance, and strength. The team that finishes first win the task.
    - Winning team: Valor
    - Highlights: At the time of the challenge, both teams were unnamed and raced around 24OWLS, and Team Valor (in black shirt) maintained the lead enough over Team Conquest (in white shirt) to secure the first physical task's victory. Each contestant revealed their experiences via confessions along the way.
  - Business Task: Teams have to create a prototype of ONE at Home fanbase kit.
- Project managers
  - Conquest: Nazee
  - Valor: Clinton
- Monologue: Anyone can be a boss, but not everyone can be a leader. Looking forward to your pitches tomorrow.
- Dramatic Tension: Clinton was vocal and focused mostly on his own vision of Team Valor's product, which led to some early friction between team members. However, Nazee delegated tasks to her teammates and united everyone, which led to more harmonious strategizing. In their pitches, Conquest came first with ONE Elevate containing a trading card and a burger, and other products that are mostly digital including a Wi-Fi dongle; Valor came next with ONE for all and contained well-rounded products, including a lucky draw concept and meal set to provide a "multi-sensory" user experience.
- Boardroom Tension: Chatri praised Team Conquest for its stellar presentation, but he admitted that the products did not live up to ONE's core brand for putting gadgets and dongles, in which Paulina was in charge for the products. Paulina explains that they were unable sell something that is too much. Roman mentioned that he was trying to push the markup 25-30% and Niharika found that Roman seems to be blaming the team for not allowing to price the way Roman did. He praised Nazee as a project manager for her delegation skills, especially with her choice to pass the presentation over to Niraj. Team Valor's presentation was criticized for spending time on marketing instead of mentioning the components of the box, especially Clinton when he was reading his presentation off his mobile device, despite their products which were superior to Team Conquest. Niharika also saw his disrespectful attitude towards other teammates, including using his mobile phone during the Conquest's presentation. He praised Jessica for saving her team after delivering a passionate marketing plan, as well as her co-leadership, with 6 out of 8 members feel Jessica was "the real project manager". Irina mentioned than Clinton is visionary, but Louie mentioned that he is a poor communicator, did not listen well to the other teammates, and Kexin also mentioned that sometimes there were moments where he was literally "screaming" several times at all teammates. But Clinton was praised for the potential that he has, and a desire to win. In the end, Chatri wants Clinton to reflect deeply about what teammates have been said.
- Winning team: Valor
  - Reasons for win: Good pick-up of the products, despite criticism for Clinton's lack of leadership, and the team's overall mediocre presentation material.
- Losing Team: Conquest
  - Reasons for loss: Despite having a good presentation and praised Nazee's leadership, Chatri felt that they had picked up the wrong products for the kit, and the team also set up low profit margin and selling prices ($79 as opposed to Valor's $139.90), which Chatri felt would not attract fans to buy their kit. Chatri also criticized Alvin's lack of copywriting skills, despite his background as a copywriter.
- Sent to boardroom: Nazee, Alvin, Lara
  - Firing verdict: Chatri initially wanted to fire one but after noticing that each member having merits and experience, coupled the fact that it was their first business task, he ultimately decides not to fire anyone, and instead encouraged the candidates to reflect on the values in themselves.
- Fired: None
- Notes:
  - This is the first time in The Apprentice franchise history that no one was fired at the first task.
  - This episode broke viewership records of all English-language reality series in Asian television as the most-watched premiere of 2021, as compared to other reality programs including the second season of MasterChef Singapore, the 20th season of The Voice, and the fifth season of The Masked Singer, which aired during the time of premiere.

=== Episode 2: The Heights ===
- Air date: 25 March 2021
- Tasks
  - Physical Task: Members of each team must reel down at a height of 11 feet (3.4 m) and climb up again via a rope ladder. The fastest team would win the task.
    - Guest Stars: Georges St-Pierre, Renzo Gracie
    - Highlights: Kexin (Valor) and Eugene (Conquest) led off the task and ended steadily; despite Sho and Jessica from Valor struggled during the task, Nazee of Conquest spent more time on climbing, which gave enough time for Valor to win the task.
    - Winning team: Valor (31:13 - 42:30)
    - Reward: A dining experience at Bar Square inside Andaz Singapore.
  - Business Task: To create a seven-day marketing promotion for Andaz Singapore, with a selection of social media influencer to promote the Andaz.
    - Guest advisor: Amy Lu, Operation Director of Andaz Singapore
    - Guest judge: Patrick Grove, CEO of Catcha Group
- Project managers
  - Conquest: Eugene
  - Valor: Louie
- Monologue: Courage is not the absence of fear. It is the presence of fear, but the ability to move forward. I am looking forward to your pitches.
- Dramatic Tension: Since Team Valor won the physical challenge, they were given the first pick of the social media influencer for their campaign, either Justin Bratton or Yumika Hoskin, which the team chose the latter, leaving Team Conquest the former. While Louie and the rest of his group were trying to manage the outcast Clinton, Eugene and Team Conquest went straight to work on their marketing plan. However, Team Valor pulled the rug from underneath Team Conquest's feet once again. After both teams finished putting together their marketing plans, pitching began with Team Valor presenting first, which was led by Sho, Kexin, and Monica. The pitch included a scavenger hunt, team members dressed as mock characters, and the brilliant #ItsAnAndazThing hashtag to tie the concept together. Chatri loved the idea, but Grove pointed out that the team lacked a clear seven-day concept. Team Conquest presented next - Niraj and Paulina initially led with a strong pitch, which included a seven-day plan. However, Eugene stumbled on his role during the presentation. Though Grove liked the seven-day plan, he felt the presentation was not unique or distinct, while Niharika noticed the spacing of the presentation was off.
- Boardroom Tension: Chatri praised Lara and Paulina's answers regarding responsibility for Team Conquest's presentation, and said he was disappointed with the rest of the team not answering the question. Chatri and Niharika were also disappointed with Eugene's presentation, and his decision to lead it, rather than give the chance to other teammates and both Chatri and Niharika felt that Eugene's presentation was mumbled at some points, as well as Roman being nervous by missing a line. Chatri and Niharika praised the catchphrase/hashtag #ItsAnAndazThing from Valor, which made the concept more memorable and believes it will be more attractive to the demographics. However, Niharika noted that Team Valor "backstabbed" Clinton to Team Conquest when he deliberated on the influencer, as they were disappointed with his performance as a project manager in the previous task.
- Winning team: Valor
  - Reasons for win: Very good overall presentation and had a memorable concept and its marketing promotion strategy despite there was no execution plan.
- Losing Team: Conquest
  - Reasons for loss: Lack of clarity in the concept as well as their marketing strategy, stumbled presentation – worsened by Roman's poor presentation skills, and also lack of Alvin's "supposed to be" promotional brochure, which must be printed before the pitch but did not finish at the day of the pitch.
- Sent to boardroom: Eugene, Roman, Alvin
- Fired:
  - Alvin Ang - for his lack of experience, drive and emotion, inability of executing his tasks and appearing in the boardroom for a second time.
  - Roman Wilson - for a formatting error in his delivery.
- Notes:
  - Eugene as the week's Project Manager of Team Conquest, initially brought Lara and Alvin to the boardroom; Chatri overrules his decision, and instead he chose Roman to replace Lara's position.
  - This was the first task to have an unplanned multiple firing (outside the interview stage) for the series. This was presumably done to make up for the non-elimination last week.

=== Episode 3: The Hunt ===
- Air date: 1 April 2021
- Tasks
  - Corporate restructuring: Since Team Conquest lost two members due to the consecutive defeats, Jessica and Kexin were moved from Valor to Conquest, while Conquest member Lara was brought to Valor to even up each team with seven members.
  - Physical Task: The teams would have to read clues, find seven blocks, and build a giant cube out of them. The first group to build the cube and have the logos of every block face the same direction would win.
    - Highlights: Teams raced across the National Stadium to read clues, find seven blocks, and build a giant cube out of them; The scavenger hunt also included runs and swims, and Team Conquest's Paulina had a panic attack midway through her laps in the pool. Eventually, she regained her composure and continued. Meanwhile, Louie swam with all his might for Team Valor. He even received a compliment from Clinton, who said that Louie looked like "some sort of dolphin". Staying true to their dominant form, Team Valor completes the cube first and gave their third consecutive physical task victory, with Lara commenting on the feel for her first victory.
    - Guest Star: Angela Lee
    - Winning team: Valor
  - Business Task: Teams have to create a recruitment marketing video for a recruiting company, Golden Equator.
- Project managers
  - Conquest: Paulina
  - Valor: Sho
- Monologue: Grit is everything. It separates the extraordinary from the ordinary. I am looking forward to your pitches.
- Dramatic Tension: Team Valor elected Sho as its project manager, while Team Conquest picked Paulina despite seeing pushbacks from Kexin. The two project managers met with Golden Equator representatives; Back in the meeting room, Clinton and Teirra clashed over the decision on who should manage the video efforts for Team Valor, but the members backed Teirra because of her video journalism background. For Team Conquest, during the video shoot, Paulina found Eugene was with all girls, when he supposed to be with Niraj. Back in Team Valor, Teirra gives Lara a chance to be the interviewer, but she found that Lara was a little bit shaky, and nervous that Team Valor, especially Teirra unable to get the soundbites that was needed. Pitches followed after each team had finished their videos. Team Conquest was the first to pitch theirs - Joy and Jessica made the presentation very personal, talking about the journey of one entrepreneur and how Golden Equator would have his back. Paulina then presented the campaign's rollout plan, while Eugene said he was not happy that his team would not listen to his ideas. Chatri, however, thought the presentation looked clean and well-prepared. Valor pitched their video campaign next. Louie immediately caught the attention of Chatri by asking if ONE's Chairman and CEO remembers what it is like to be a new entrepreneur. Irina made the presentation even more emotional when she talked about the power of believing in the Golden Equator. Still, Team Valor's presentation seemed to lack real substance, and Clinton complained that his teammates did not include him in their efforts. Monica capped off the presentation with a social media campaign but failed to deliver an actionable plan for the second straight episode. After the pitch, Eugene was surprised as Team Valor's video was better than Team Conquest. Kexin warned that Team Conquest cannot compare themself with Team Valor for having the same content as Team Valor. But she mentioned that Chatri not only liked emotional videos, but also empowering videos. For Team Valor, while Lara took heat for not contributing much and going to bed early when a project was due, the entire Team Valor starts to gang up on Clinton for doing nothing, went to bed at a reasonable hour, and for have no respect to the rest of teammates.
- Boardroom Tension: Chatri praised Team Conquest for their plan, commenting that it had real substance and Jessica's slide brought the presentation to life, but noted that the pitch lacked emotion. Paulina told on Eugene for disturbing her during the task, with four members brought out on the issue. For Team Valor, Chatri informed by Niharika that Clinton was a problem and had to isolate him, and even called him almost like Eugene's "twin". Chatri raised concerns over Clinton in which the members ganged up him for his lack of teamwork, and Sho was commented by Niharika on a stance of democracy instead of showing cohesion, with the statement that "Leadership it does not mean getting the populist vote". Chatri spoke to Irina next on Lara, who slept more over work, and Teirra replied that her skills set is limited. Chatri said the content in their presentation was weak and does not have any execution plan, which Monica was partially blamed for not coming up one. In the end, Chatri says to every single team "you guys screwed up".
- Winning team: Conquest
  - Reasons for win: Despite the lack of some points to attract recruits, they have better concept for their overall video, presentation, and execution plan.
- Losing Team: Valor
  - Reasons for loss: Bad concept of video and presentation, coupled by the lack of their execution plan, in which Chatri gave a warning to Team Valor during the previous task.
- Sent to boardroom: Sho, Clinton, Lara
- Fired: Lara Pearl Alvarez - lack of her conscientious and teamwork, and her inability to get along in the task and with the team.
- Note:
  - This is the third consecutive victory for Team Valor on physical task; However, this is the first time Team Conquest emerged victorious on business task.

=== Episode 4: The Heat ===
- Air date: 8 April 2021
- Tasks
  - Physical Task: Teams competed each other in a Bubble football, and the team who scored more goals under 10 minutes wins.
    - Guest Star: Sage Northcutt
    - Highlights: Since Conquest had an extra member, Niraj suggested Nazee to sit out and she agreed. During the challenge, Eugene focused on its offense and battered Valor members repeatedly, including Clinton. Neither team scored a goal until about nine minutes later when Joy scored their task's only goal, giving Conquest their first physical task victory. After the task ended, Clinton and Eugene engaged in a judo fighting, much to the surprise of other teammates.
    - Winning team: Conquest (1-0; Nazee exempted)
  - Business Task: Teams have to work with TiffinLabs to create a digital restaurant for mixed Korean and Western food, using TiNDLE's plant-based food products as a main ingredient.
    - Corporate restructuring: Eugene was moved to Team Valor, as Chatri wanted to see a spark from Eugene, which he did not see when Eugene was with Team Conquest; Clinton was also moved to Team Conquest, as Chatri felt that Clinton wanted to feel a new atmosphere of teamwork, which Clinton did not get on Team Valor, and also his "backstabbed" feeling from his fellow teammates from Team Valor from the previous two tasks, as well as after the physical task.
    - Guest judge: Kishin RK, chairman and CEO of TiffinLabs.
- Project managers
  - Conquest: Kexin
  - Valor: Irina
- Monologue: The world needs more original souls who are alive - truly alive - with passion, purpose, and grit to help make this world a better place. Looking forward to your pitches.
- Dramatic Tension: In Team Valor, Eugene knew how the Korean cuisine looked like due to him having a Korean American background. However, the project manager Irina, along with Monica and Teirra, struggled on making a logo for their digital restaurant, commenting on its hideous design. On Team Conquest, they worked with TiffinLabs founder Shaun Smithson directly for their proposal as a result of their win on the physical task. However, project manager Kexin, who revealed having worked with a fast food restaurant before, alongside Joy and Nazee, also faced some issues on who would create the pitch deck, and they wound up hastily putting one together when their project was due. During the pitch, Team Valor was the first to present and their restaurant was titled "Seoul Food Kitchen", with their menu being "The Breakfast Cluck" and "The Super Pulled Chick", which was praised by Chatri and RK, though Chatri questioned on the expensive pricing ($20–25, as opposed to Conquest's $15.50-17.50). Team Conquest came up "La Takorea" and their dishes were "Taco Dirty To Me" and "Mandu De La Kasa" as their menu. Chatri and RK were impressed on their dishes and plan, but later commented that the theme felt "childish" and criticized their plan, bearing similarities to a budget fast food joint.
- Boardroom Tension: Chatri praised Eugene for the task and Team Valor, and in return expresses his gratitude. However, Chatri admonished Monica for the presentation and packaging, and spending more time on making a rollout plan, though Chatri did not ask for one, which Sho defended it on his "scientific approach", followed by Teirra's when she fumbled during presentation. Chatri addressed Team Conquest next; he criticized Kexin for their theme which does not fit among the demographic, but later returned it as a comedy presentation. When Chatri asked Clinton on his reshuffle, he told that it was "life's best work", much to his chagrin, along with his feeling that he mostly relied on Niraj during initial stages the most, especially on creating a mood board, despite having a photography background. Kexin criticized Joy and Nazee for not helping with the pitch deck, but it was Jessica who was praised by Chatri for handling the situation well, notably the first time the team did graphic designing. This caused Eugene to shake his head, realizing that the problems had been raised, prompting Chatri to comment Joy and Nazee on poor cohesion as compared to Team Valor, and even called them an "incompetent" team. At the end, Chatri commented on both teams that they have failed in some critical parts.
- Winning team: Conquest
  - Reasons for win: Despite the theme that did not fit into their overall product, its packaging matched the concept more.
- Losing Team: Valor
  - Reasons for loss: The price tag they set was too expensive, as opposed to with just only styrofoam packaging which was not worth the budget, despite the fact they have better products and presentation, which was also marred by Teirra's nervousness.
- Sent to boardroom: Irina, Sho, Teirra
  - Firing verdict: Chatri initially planned to fire only one, but he decided to fire both Teirra and Sho as they "do not want this for the right reason", and he did so upon hearing the pleas on all three of them and his evaluation after four weeks; he initially planned to fire Irina as well, but he decide to keep her, praising on her motivation as well as her responsibility for the task, which Niharika also commented on during the discussion.
- Fired:
  - Teirra Kamolvattanavith - for being nervous, and doubtful on taking risks for the task and her team.
  - Sho Takei - lack of passion and strategy, as noted by Chatri when he did on some of previous tasks.
- Note:
  - This was the second unplanned multiple firing within three episodes, after episode 2. It was also the first-time members from the original Team Valor were fired at the end of the task.
  - Team Conquest's "La Takorea" was made exclusively available on GrabFood for Singapore only, 48 hours after the episode's broadcast.

=== Episode 5: The Hurdle ===
- Air date: 15 April 2021
- Tasks
  - Physical Task: Teams compete in a best-of-three Dragon boat racing.
    - Guest Stars: Brandon Vera (Valor) and Sage Northcutt (Conquest)
    - Highlights: During the physical task, Valor's Eugene hindered the team on the water resistance and his vision due to its splashing, resulting in their team having a shutout, and Vera was disappointed on their defeat; Conquest's Jessica also ached at some point but managed to complete the round and swept the task 2-0.
    - Winning team: Conquest (2-0; Joy, Nazee and Paulina exempt)
  - Business Task: Teams were tasked to create a collaborative product that combined the two retailers from Jewel Changi Airport, The Shirt Bar and Bengawan Solo.
    - Corporate restructuring: Following last week's surprise firing of two Team Valor members, they were left with four members meaning that one member from team Conquest will be moved to balance the teams. Paulina was moved from Conquest to Valor to balance the teams.
    - Guest judge: Ankiti Bose, co-founder and CEO of Zilingo.
- Project managers
  - Conquest: Joy
  - Valor: Monica
- Monologue: There is magic everywhere, but you have to believe it to see it. If you believe in possibilities, you will see possibilities. Looking forward to your pitch.
- Dramatic Tension: Prior to the business task, Chatri reprimanded each contestant on their mediocrity and failing to hit his expectations, then announced that he will be including an appointment as a member of the ONE's Chief of staff as a winner's prize, before announcing that Paulina would be moved to Valor. Joy volunteered herself to be Team Conquest's project manager, despite Nazee proposed Jessica to step up as the project manager, and after a quick vote, the entire member of Team Conquest agreed. Joy got off to a strong start as the leader, but when Niharika entered the room, Clinton flexed his muscles over the pricing of the team's product and later caught flack for it. Their product was "The Heritage Collection", a hybrid product line containing a table book, a mobile phone app, and kitchenware. Chatri liked the plan, but guest judge Ankiti mentioned that Team Conquest focused too much on Bengawan Solo versus The Shirt Bar for the collaboration. And Niharika flat-out said the product was underwhelming. Monica was named Valor's project manager as she has experience running retail, and their procedure for the product development went at a good pace. Their eventual product became "Esensi", a line of scented candles based on the five distinct flavours from Bengawan Solo and the design by the customers from The Shirt Bar. Sure, the team's candle was not the most superb of products, but as Chatri called it 'outstanding' on the concept, the level of detail was unmatched, and appalled on its design and pricing. Ankiti, however, again pointed out that the product had no connection to The Shirt Bar.
- Boardroom Tension: Niharika gave a positive review on each team's presentation but missed out on certain key details. Team Valor was evaluated first and Chatri reiterated the faults on the previous task, which Monica took responsibility on. They then praised Paulina on her performance when she included a Venn diagram on the presentation. When Niharika asked who to bring to the final boardroom should they lost, Monica chose Eugene and Louie; the latter opposed as he told on a contributor as a backend. Team Conquest, on the other hand, praised their product but lacked unison and lambasted their execution plan; Kexin told her contributions, but Chatri told it lacked consistency and detail. Niraj pointed out that Nazee and Clinton that they were to blame for the team's lack of fundamentals due to their attitude and even accused the former of conspiracy by letting Jessica be the project manager last week to let her fail, while the latter was taking support on the pricing which they caught flack on; Niraj concluded that their members found it difficult to trust and wishes not to stay on the team. Nazee denied Niraj's accusation and Jessica stood upon their judgement, followed by Joy on her efforts. When Niharika questioned Joy on who the weakest links were, she answered Kexin and Niraj, which most of them disagreed on.
- Winning team: Valor
  - Reasons for win: Despite the packaging of the products were not fit, their product line was unified, and their concept fared better, which also factored into Paulina's acclaimed plan.
- Losing Team: Conquest
  - Reasons for loss: The approach of their product was too simple, which only fits into the one-sided concept and lacked a combination, marred with their disappointing presentation and lack of clearance of their execution plan.
- Sent to boardroom: Joy, Clinton, Kexin
  - Boardroom Tension: Niharika said that Clinton seems to have found friends, which is Niraj. Chatri also noticed a spark of creative genius in Clinton since day 1. Niharika was very disappointed and questioned on Joy's judgement that the fact she initially chose the two people who contributed the most to go to the chopping block, which the deck, the product, the execution, and detailed orientation was the strongest part, who is literally Jessica, Kexin, and Niraj. Chatri immediately firing Joy for playing a political game in which she is the pawn, which causing an unfair decision of bring Kexin to the final boardroom instead of Nazee. He then turned to Clinton and told him that he would make it through by the skin of his teeth. Afterward, he called Kexin a "warrior" and told her she has a sense of goodness.
- Fired: Joy Koh - for having a terrible leadership quality and her inability to control her team, which Chatri gave a zero-tolerance for her earlier sleep time than her teammates, and even called her a "political pawn".
- Note:
  - Jessica and Kexin were on the losing team for the first time, breaking their four-week winning streak.
  - This is the first task where the team's discussion room was not set at Andaz during the first half of the episode (the Jewel Changi Airport office).

=== Episode 6: Mind Over Matter ===
- Air date: 22 April 2021
- Tasks
  - Physical Task: Teams competed in a game show to test their knowledge relating to ONE Championship. The first team to score five points wins the round, and the first team to win three rounds wins the task.
    - Guest Stars: Brandon Vera (Conquest), Ben Askren (Valor)
    - Highlight: Both teams answered questions in succession, while incorrect answers and losing team for the round had their stars spin up the Wheel of Forfeit (a parody of Wheel of Fortune), taking on random punishments. In the end, Valor managed to sweep the game 3-0 with Louie answering the game-deciding question in the third round.
    - Winning team: Valor (3-0; 3–5, 1–5, 4–5)
    - Reward: Shopping for travelling purposes at Tumi.
  - Business Task: Teams have to come up with a travel advertisement/solution plan, focusing on artificial intelligence technology for Everise.
    - Guest advisor/judge: Sudhir Agarwal, CEO of Everise
- Project managers
  - Conquest: Niraj
  - Valor: Louie
- Dramatic Tension: Niraj quickly elects himself as the project manager for Team Conquest as he has not done one. Jessica was also considered for the role, but she let Niraj due to suspected conspiracy. Team Conquest decided to focus on the car rental industry, but as soon as Niraj started to lead the brainstorming session, Clinton intervened which led to an argument with Niraj and even knocked a chair down, prompting Niraj to confront him privately in the hallway, much to the shock of the other members. In Team Valor, Louie became the project manager for the second time and went smoothly. Louie and the rest of his team went straight to work on their project, which they decided would focus on travel insurance. They also met with Sudhir to come up with some problems that travelers usually face. However, Monica concerned about Eugene for the lack of communication and the pitch deck, while others found Eugene is carrying a burden for the team. Meanwhile, Monica formed a secret "final 2" alliance with Irina named Morina. During the pitch, Conquest went first with a solution for a car rental industry: "Car Rentals From Down Under". Sudhir liked the delivery, but he felt confused about the problem Team Conquest was trying to solve, as they never implicitly state any of the solutions. However, Chatri did not mince words. After looking at the financial report and reviewing the numbers, he called it ‘junk’. Valor presented next on their travel insurance solution, "Xpedition" and was acclaimed by the panel, and even by Sudhir who would definitely evaluate the product.
- Boardroom Tension: Chatri asked Team Valor how Louie performed as acting project manager, and they all agreed that he was organized. They also said that Eugene contributed little to this business task, but Louie did praise his willingness to learn. Chatri recalled the last week's physical task in which Eugene's lack of fortitude had contributed the team to a loss but reminded that he seeks a requirement for his PhD (poor, hungry, and determined) in attitude and spirit, before praising the team for proper management. Meanwhile, on team Conquest, Nazee began her mention on "conflict resolution" where Niraj excluded Clinton from the project in hopes to eliminating him, while Niraj brought to his bring, and explained how he handled Clinton to Chatri, and concluded that he feels he would not want to believe anyone. Nazee also jumped in to bring the issue of how poorly of a job Niraj did with the poorly designed "financial report", due to time constraints and poor financing skills, which lead to an ensuing debate.
- Winning team: Valor
  - Reasons for win: Although Eugene lacked contribution, their presentation and concept were cohesive and well-acclaimed.
- Losing Team: Conquest
  - Reasons for loss: Their presentation was too simple and confusing, as well as the team's lack of coordination which was mostly marred by Clinton and Niraj.
- Sent to boardroom: Niraj, Clinton, Nazee
  - Boardroom Tension: Chatri first questioned Niraj on his role, explaining his premonition on the team's failure and decided to take a gamble. Nazee praised Niraj on his speech but criticize on his skills and his timing, but the latter declined the accusations and defended on the products, before Clinton raised his point about self-awareness, leaving Chatri to comment on that and asking why he would bother working with him. Clinton did reserve some criticism for Niraj, telling them that he was ostracizing him. Nirahika pointed Clinton's insistence, an obstruction from the team itself, and by "staying out" is the more suitable option. Chatri considers firing Niraj, but he ultimately fire Clinton, by having enough information, evidence, and reasons to do so.
- Fired: Clinton Tudor - his inability to get along with most of his teammates, emotion and cohesion, and gave empty promises which many did not show it by him. This was also evidential on his track record, when he was in the final boardroom each time he was on the losing team.
- Note:
  - Niraj was sent to the boardroom for the first time, despite he was already on the losing team three times.
  - This is the first time a guest advisor was introduced prior to the start of the business task, instead of as a guest judge during the pitch.
  - For the first time, there was no monologue.
  - Some international versions and broadcast of the episode uses the alternate episode title of "The Halfway Mark" instead of "Mind Over Matter".

=== Episode 7: Unleash the Beast ===
- Air date: 29 April 2021
- Prologue: All nine remaining members celebrated with the elimination of Clinton, but tensions still rise between Jessica and Nazee.
- Tasks
  - Physical Task: One member of each team head-to-head in a grappling fight. Teams compete in a best-of-four five-minute match and the first team to win three matches wins; if required, a sudden death may be played if each team is tied with two wins.
    - Guest Stars: Ritu Phogat, Xiong Jingnan
    - Highlight: Louie, as the last task's project manager, decide to sit out the task to let Eugene take on Niraj in the final match. Lau assigned the members to compete in each match: Irina compete and defeated Jessica in the first match; Paulina and Nazee compete in the second match and ended in a timeout, and Nazee was declared the winner; Monica and Kexin competed third and Kexin tapped out. The decisive fourth match between Eugene and Niraj competed brutally but ended in a timeout, and despite Niraj led off to a steady start, Eugene emerged as the match's winner and thus, giving Valor's their task's victory. After the task ended, both Chatri and Niharika enter the MMA Evolve site, praising the candidates first before commencing the business task.
    - Winning team: Valor (3-1; Louie exempted)
  - Business Task: Teams have to create a public relation campaign, which include a presentation and podcast (sponsored by Coconuts Media), to promote awareness of wildlife contribution by the Wildlife Reserves Singapore (WRS).
    - Corporate Restructuring: Irina was switched from Valor to Conquest.
    - Guest advisor: Haniman Boniran, Educator of Wildlife Reserves Singapore
    - Guest judge: Melissa Kwee, CEO of the National Volunteer and Philanthropy Centre
- Project managers
  - Conquest: Jessica
  - Valor: Eugene
- Monologue: Greatness can only be measured by what we do for others - our loved ones, our friends, our companies, our communities, our countries, our world.
- Dramatic Tension: Jessica acted as the project manager for Conquest, but Nazee thought her role was favouring their team and arguments arise, as Jessica gives nothing for Nazee. In Valor, Eugene stepped up as a project manager in hopes to do better against his rival Niraj, while Monica undermined his role by having a chat, ending it by calling him "paranoid". However, the girls agreed that Louie was planning to get rid of Eugene by intentionally losing the task, after seeing Louie sit out on the physical task. During the pitching, Conquest came first on their plan: "Wild Habits", but the advertorial failed to evoke with an overly clinical approach, and did not focus on pangolins heavily; however, Kwee replied on the good relationship for the campaign to their target audience. Valor's pitch, "Not As Tough As We Look", which also featured Brandon Vera in the slides, went next and was praised on the engagement with the audience, including Kwee noting that every hero has a cause, though Chatri slammed it on the activity detail.
- Boardroom Tension: Chatri first questioned Louie on why he sat out on the physical task which Irina jumped in to say it was strategic on Louie's part to let Eugene compete because if he lost, it would have been easy to eliminate him. Jessica pointed out that it was both Eugene's and Louie's job to protect Valor, despite having a fighter background as a Purple belt jiu-jitsu practitioner, in which he revealed that there was no honour to grapple a white belt, and he would want to give Eugene an opportunity to shine and to have an equal level playing field. Still, Chatri thought that Louie put his team at risk. Chatri now addresses the issues for the Business task: he first questioned Jessica on who contributed the least, to which she replied Nazee even though she gave little to none of the roles for Nazee. Tension mounted between her and Nazee and by calling her "kindergarten". It seemed that Team Conquest was on its way to the chopping block, and Niharika asked who she would bring to the final boardroom if they lost, she named Kexin as well, leading Chatri to criticize Kexin for not doing her part as a social media campaigner. Then Kexin revealed she broke up with her boyfriend during the competition. Chatri next praised Valor's presentation, but Eugene's presentation was mumbled at some points. Eugene said that Paulina contributed the least, even though she did almost half the work, but the other members disagree and took on Eugene instead. However, once Niraj mentioned "Lin the Pangolin" right before Chatri decided the winner, he was furious at the team on copyright infringement (because the intellectual property of "Lin the Pangolin" existed online and they have not sought approval on using one according to the original owner World Wide Fund for Nature, though Monica named the pangolin "Lin" and was unaware on the naming itself, but aware that "Ollie the Pangolin" had claimed) before going on to scold them they "bombed" the task, and begin to doubt to Eugene's leadership.
- Winning team: Conquest
  - Reasons for win: Despite the overall concept did not fit in and the lack of emotional sides, they have more great overall action, as Chatri praised their action will be more attractive to target audiences.
- Losing Team: Valor
  - Reasons for loss: Despite their overall more decent presentation, the inclusion of "Lin the Pangolin" in the slides by Monica caused a copyright infringement, which is a violation of the competition rules, in addition to Eugene's mumbling and leadership skills.
- Sent to boardroom: No final boardroom – While it was discussed that each team member equally failed their respective roles during the task, Chatri immediately fired Eugene without the need for a final boardroom. He concluded with a statement that "Leaders do what is right – not what is easy".
- Fired: Eugene Chung - for poor judgement, leadership skills, team collaboration and lack of fortitude, as noted by Chatri for Eugene's performance for the past seven weeks.
- Note:
  - This is the first time that Chatri and Niharika introduced the week's business task immediately after the physical task ended, and contestants are not seen switching uniforms between scenes.

=== Episode 8: Change the Cycle ===
- Air date: 6 May 2021
- Tasks
  - Corporate Restructuring: Following last week's events (Eugene's firing and Irina switching to Conquest), Niraj was moved from Conquest to Valor to balance each team with four members.
  - Physical Task: Teams compete in a simulation on helicopter crashing. The team that got all four of its members to disengage from their seats, swim through the windows and climb onto the life raft the fastest would win.
    - Guest Stars: Rich Franklin
    - Highlight: While both teams had some members having panic on swimming, Conquest's Nazee took more time during escape as she was stuck on a ladder during escape, giving way to Valor's third consecutive victory for the physical task.
    - Winning team: Valor
    - Reward: A detox massage session. (unaired)
  - Business Task: Teams have to come out with a project that sells sustainable goods and to earn the highest sales and profit margins, using both Business-to-business (B2B) and Direct-to-consumer (B2C).
    - Guest advisor/judge: Naoyuki Ikuta, CEO of Techno System (aired in AXN Asia only)
- Project managers
  - Conquest: Irina
  - Valor: Paulina
- Dramatic Tension: Prior to the business task, Nirahika reminded the candidates that nobody will perform stealthily during this task, which also factored into individual performances in addition to teamwork, after her observation from the previous business tasks. Irina acted as project manager for Team Conquest though Nazee was considered, while Paulina acted as project manager for Valor. Jessica and Irina split up as one group and Kexin worked with Nazee although Irina said Nazee was a little 'cooperative'. In team Valor, Niraj struggled to find decent items, and the weak profit cost Team Valor during the pitch deck. Both teams later met their buyers – both from the B2B and B2C worlds – and negotiate prices that would increase their profit margins. Conquest initially struggled on their detail, but they justified high prices by including free workshops with their sustainable goods. Team Valor acted swiftly on sales except for Niraj, which drew criticism from Nirahika. Later on, Valor began their pitch by mentioning upcycling, but Monica fumbled at some points while facing Chatri; the panel praised for its smart strategy and outstanding presentation but lacked equality. Kexin led Team Conquest on their pitch and also fumbled on getting the name of the retailer Timbre wrong, drawing attention to the judges, though Chatri praised the sales but criticized the first page of the presentation with poor grammar.
- Boardroom Tension: Chatri commented that Conquest's profit was very large, and he respected Jessica and Nazee's career. He criticized Kexin for the lack of focus and contribution. Team Valor was next, and Monica was praised on the direction but commented on poor sales, when Chatri mention on the presentation, she replied humorously to him that he gave a "piercing glare". When Nirahika comment on the sales, Paulina revealed that they focused more on B2B due to constraints made by the team, especially on the team's lack of experience in sales. Paulina named Louie and Niraj as the most and least contributing member respectively with Chatri mentioned that Niraj was the weakest in both teams and how Nirahika found it disappointing on him repeating the same word of "forte". Even though it was confirmed that Conquest took home the win, Chatri praised Paulina and later criticized Monica for stumbling.
- Winning team: Conquest
  - Reasons for win: Despite showing a poorly designed presentation, Chatri favoured the team's victory by their higher profits and retail fundamentals. They made S$26,416, which include the largest individual sale by Jessica with S$11,230.
- Losing Team: Valor
  - Reasons for loss: Despite the better presentation, their profit was lower as compared to Conquest's profit, mostly due to poor retail experience. They made S$15,769, losing by a difference of $10,647.
- Sent to boardroom: Paulina, Monica, Niraj
  - Boardroom Tension: Chatri and Niharika admitted the difficulty of eliminating one candidate each week due to their affection but later reminded of the show's ultimate goal of finding "the ONE". Chatri questioned on Monica for being a new "one-trick pony" on marketing with Niharika was not convinced for her to be the chief of staff. Chatri commented on Paulina on leadership; he praised on her life story but mentioned her performance was not outstanding; Monica reminded Chatri and Niharika that she has the grit and resilience to be a leader, and Niraj admitted that his values are his biggest assets despite not having a certain skill set, which Chatri replied that Niraj has too many excuses. Chatri ultimately fired Niraj because of his poor leadership but praising him for making it this far. Chatri then commented to Monica and Paulina, as there are seven candidates remain, he asked both of them to display their leadership as to "be truly outstanding".
- Fired: Niraj Puran Rao - despite showing tremendous attitude and working skills, Chatri found Niraj displaying weak leadership skills and gave too many excuses for each of his faults. Niraj was also the weakest contributor overall in terms of individual sales for the task, at only $180, as compared to team Conquest's weakest individual sale, Kexin, with $190.
- Note:
  - The switching of Niraj to Valor meant Nazee became the last surviving Team Conquest member to remain on the original team. As of this episode, Louie and Monica were also the last surviving Team Valor members to remain on their original team.
  - Monica and Paulina were sent to the boardroom for the first time, despite they already on the losing team three times.
  - Irina has been on the winning team for the fourth consecutive time, tying with Jessica, Kexin and Paulina for the consecutive record for the season.

=== Episode 9: Win the Game ===
- Air date: 13 May 2021
- Tasks
  - Physical Task: Teams competed in a series of best-of-three dodgeball. The last candidate standing wins one match for the team, and the first team to win two matches wins the task.
    - Guest Stars: Demetrious Johnson
    - Highlight: Lau announced that he and Johnson will be playing along for Team Valor and Conquest respectively. Irina as the last task's project manager, let Kexin sit out of the Physical task. In the first game, Paulina gave Valor their first win after knocking down Conquest's last member Johnson; in the second game, Conquest's Johnson knocked Valor's Lau to bring them to the deciding third match. In the final game, Monica and Louie quickly knock most of Conquest quickly, and Monica knocking the last member Irina gave Valor's their task's victory.
    - Winning team: Valor (2-1; Kexin exempted)
    - Reward: Dinner at Ocean Restaurant in Sentosa.
  - Business Task: Teams were tasked to create a launch campaign on TUMI's first gaming bag collection, Alpha Bravo e-sports Pro.
    - Guest advisor/judge: Adam Hershman, Vice President of TUMI (Asia Pacific & Middle East)
- Project managers
  - Conquest: Kexin
  - Valor: Monica
- Monologue: Do not let anyone or anything stop you from unleashing your greatness in life. The world deserves to witness your greatness. Looking forward to your pitches.
- Dramatic Tension: Conquest opted Kexin as the project manager due to a gamer experience, and their campaign targeted amateur players that revolved around a fictional tournament Alpha Bravo World Championship. Irina felt that her role as project manager was not clear as she was still overcoming the grief of breakup at the same time, and Jessica thought that Kexin was micromanaging her. Monica assumed her project manager role for team Valor, coming up with a campaign revolving around the journey of a champion gamer. After both teams met with Hershman and Dota 2 player Clement Ivanov to brainstorm ideas, teams began their photoshoot and video taking for their pitches. Tensions between Louie and Monica grew after the latter, who forgot to bring her laptop, took the former's laptop without permission and thus he was left his tablet to work on, though he forgives her when Monica encourage him to safeguard their laptops in the future. During the pitches, Conquest came first but Niharika commented that the presentation lacked visual, then Chatri noted that it was the worst presentation he ever saw since the competition's start, and Hershman commented on the connection but criticized the execution plan. On the other hand, Team Valor's presentation was praised on its execution plan, the video campaign, and concept, though Chatri mentions how it could be improved.
- Boardroom Tension: Chatri began by addressing Valor's creative presentation, but the concept did not hit the mark. He later questioned Paulina of Monica's leadership skills, which received praise, and called Louie an "ice king" for the control of his temper during dire situations. Chatri addressed team Conquest next on its lambasted presentation, saying that they have disappointed TUMI out of embarrassment. Kexin said that she took Chatri's advisory which he commented her as "incompetent" and failing to overcome the grief and told that Nazee took more time on doing the statistics which she gave with the idea and strategy with Jessica micromanaging their jobs for each, and Irina said that their roles were not performed accordingly.
- Winning team: Valor
  - Reasons for win: Despite seeing Monica's poor coordination but good leading, their overall product and presentation performed better.
- Losing Team: Conquest
  - Reasons for loss: Their overall design and concept lack visual, and their defeat were caused by unsatisfactory teamwork and overall team performance.
- Sent to boardroom: Kexin, Irina, Nazee
  - Boardroom Tension: After team Conquest's battering blowout loss, Kexin told she would bring Irina and Nazee to the boardroom, but Nazee questioned her on her working with the poor strategy and contribution, then Jessica argued that Nazee was seen slacking during brainstorming sessions and failing to provide any collaboration on ideas, claiming that she steals values from the team. Irina also questioned her decision, and she told it was the scope that does not relate to the entire strategy, but Kexin replied that contribution factored her decision, which Jessica was exempted for as she contributed the most for the team, but Nazee defended it as an idea of forming an alliance in exchange on not presenting her deliverables well, and Irina later recalled on last week's role as a project manager and asked on why she does not contribute enough. Kexin also added on the pitch, but Irina denied and Nazee told that they have lacked getting key information from them. After Chatri questioned again to Kexin, she ultimately went on her first choice (Irina and Nazee). During the private discussion, Niharika worried that Team Conquest seems to be going to the "dogs". Both Chatri and Niharika torn on Nazee (for always struck Niharika that almost everybody who works around her has consistency in what they say) vs Irina (for being sent back to the chopping block where Niharika had not noticed one thing that made her outstanding). Later, Chatri announced that he would first fire Nazee, and then Kexin, before telling Irina that he believed in her and expected her to do her best in the future.
- Fired:
  - Nazee Sajedi - for displaying poor cohesion and teamwork, for being a weak contributor, and behaving in a disrespectful manner by harassing members, especially Niraj. Chatri however, respected her mission in life and feminism.
  - Kexin Ye - for her laid-back demeanor and lack of focus, as well as the lack of team management as a team leader which Chatri noted on her less stellar performances. He praised her for going out into the world to grow and figure out her identity.
- Notes:
  - This week marked three firsts in this episode: Dom Lau participated in a Physical task, guest star Hershman revealed the business task instead of Niharika, and teams only have one day to execute the task, instead of the usual day and a half.
  - This is the third week after week 4 to have a double firing. Out of the three tasks, this is the first task one from each position was fired (a project manager and a task member), and the first time the elimination was planned, which was announced before the start of the boardroom phase.
  - The physical task victory meant that Team Valor had won four physical tasks consecutively.

=== Episode 10: Rise Above ===
- Air date: 20 May 2021
- Prologue: The final five candidates enjoyed a big breakfast at 665 °F before Chatri make his entrance, who then escorted them to Arena Singapore to play street soccer with Boys' Town, in which Chatri was one of the donors. Along the way, Louie revealed his story on how he had disappointed his wife (later revealed in the finale as a romantic affair) and told he could not forgive himself for what he done. Then after the soccer session, prior to the business task, Niharika announced that the two groups, Conquest and Valor, will be dissolved from this point of the challenge, and the Final Five named it "Dream Team".
- Business Task: Teams have to host a trade event to attract clients for the Jakarta International Expo.
  - Guest judges: Prajna Murdaya, director of CCM Group; Karuna Murdaya, Jakarta International Expo Director; Jessica Felicia Anwar, Director at Barre 2 Barre and Seriously Keto; Althea Lim, Group CEO of Gushcloud International; Chris Ang, Vice President of Three Angles Group; and Carlos Alimurung, CEO of ONE Esports
- Project manager: Paulina
- Dramatic Tension: Louie called it a "sorority party" as he was the only male candidate among the final five and expressing his oddity, while each one expressed their opinions and reasons why they wanted to be the project manager. Paulina took a gambit by electing her to be project manager because she represents Indonesia, in which Jakarta was the capital city. Paulina then delegate tasks except Irina, lacking the key values given by her. Irina was reunited with Monica and continued their 'Morina' alliance, concerning about Louie's performance though doing more on the technical areas. As there is one team, all five presented the event with Jessica leading a unified presentation, in which the Murdaya brothers gave mixed reviews, Niharika cited the text was too many, and Chatri said it was disappointing. The clients voted Jessica as the best candidate for the task, and Irina as the worst (with none of the votes cast for her).
- Boardroom Tension: The judges praised the team for a factual presentation but is too corporate in the concept. The judges also praised Paulina for the contribution but admitted that Monica and Jessica did more on marketing material; Chatri called the presentation 'dry' and found Monica doubtful in taking risks, which Irina came to her defense and their tension develop. Irina named Jessica and Louie as the most and least contributing member respectively with the former being a sales representative, and the latter opposed and told that he would go further and none of the members believed him or accepted his assistance and Monica even accused him of lying. Chatri praised Jessica's charisma but was too conservative.
- Sent to boardroom: Paulina, Irina, Louie
- Fired: Paulina Purnomowati - despite seeing great leadership and contribution, Chatri found Paulina led their team to a failure and contributed to more errors as compared to Irina (for her well-rounded attitude but lacked breakthrough) and Louie (for his background and his involvement despite contributing lesser).
- Notes:
  - Despite seeing contestants compete in soccer, there is no physical task from this episode onward.
  - Paulina's firing marks the end of the original Team Conquest, as the final four candidates are from the same Team (Valor).
  - Louie was sent to the boardroom for the first time, despite he already on the losing team five times. As of this episode, Jessica is the only candidate left not to have sent to the boardroom.

=== Episode 11: Risks and Rewards ===
- Air date: 27 May 2021
- Prologue: The final four spent a day with Chatri to watch a match in Singapore Indoor Stadium then, given a US$2,000 shopping spree to shop at Hugo Boss and a dinner at 665 °F. The next day, Chatri announced that two people will be fired by the end of the business task, and the final four were split into two and worked as a pair together (Monica and Irina, Jessica and Louie).
- Business Task: Each team have to come up with a concept using Twilio's technology to improve the way non-governmental organization connect with donors and volunteers.
  - Guest advisor/judge: Jeff Lawson, CEO of Twilio; Hua Fung Teh, President of ONE Group
- Project manager: No project manager
- Dramatic Tension: The Morina alliance went with Habitat for Humanity Singapore, a beneficiary to eliminate poverty. Irina narrates a story of a plight of a single mother without adequate housing, and Monica shows Twilio is the perfect technology for donors and volunteers to connect with the people and estimated that 600 donors will be added to the list every year and concluded that how donors can become brand champions. Jessica and Louie went with LOVE, NILS, a cancer beneficiary, and they came with the concept to create a chatbot, Claire of NILS PALS, that offers emotional support to children being treated for cancer. Louie revealed his experience as a survivor and the facts of how many children die to cancer each year, and Jessica with the story of how LOVE, NILS's founder Lesli Berggren lost her son to cancer and founded the beneficiary. Both presentations were acclaimed but flawed at some points (Jessica/Louie with the lack of financial aspects and metrics, and Morina with evoking the audience). Monica later stepped in and questioned on privacy with their proposed technology impromptu, but Jessica quickly replied on multi-factor authentication, much to the other team's surprise on her reaction timing.
- Boardroom Tension: Chatri questioned to the final four that why they should deserve to win, and each gave a separate reason: Monica said she deserves the position because she does not settle for anything less than greatness. Irina said she deserves it because of her desire of learning after each challenge. Louie kept his answer simple, saying that his core values align with ONE's. Jessica took a risk by turning the question back on Chatri, which she went on an outburst by opening her candid. After Chatri sent back everyone and a private discussion with Niharika, he declared both Louie (his grit, resiliency and PhD factor despite relying much of strategy) and Jessica (her toughness, honesty, passion and creativity) are the final two candidates who had advanced to the finals to compete for the position, thereby firing the Morina alliance but praised them for their performances.
- Fired: Both candidates from the Morina alliance, each with a 6-4 track record (as compared to Jessica's 7-3 and Louie's 5-5), along with the following reasons:
  - Irina Chadsey - for having the weakest track record among the four candidates (she was the only candidate to have a loss as a record in project manager as compared to the other three candidates which had zero losses, and was sent to the final boardroom thrice), and the inadequacy of her well-being, though Chatri believed in her motivation and desire to come to this competition.
  - Monica Millington - despite having the best record as a project manager along with Louie (2-0) and Chatri perceived her as a "one-trick pony", Monica was fired due to being too conservative against the other candidates and made too many critical mistakes during the previous business tasks which had been noted by Chatri in the past.
- Notes:
  - Lawson teleconferenced with the final four during their pitches instead of appearing in-person.
  - This is the fourth multiple-firing this season, and the second time within three episodes to be announced as planned (it was announced before the task's commencement); this had the second most instances of multiple-firings for any season in the entire The Apprentice franchise, only behind the tenth British season, which had five (not counting withdrawals).
  - This episode is similar to that of how the final two were decided for both seasons four and five of the original American series, as Chatri forego an interview week for a business task to decide the final two. These episodes, however, also have the differences between this episode and both aforementioned episodes:
    - The final four teams worked in pairs under a single individual team, instead of the two teams under original names. There was no project manager in the case.
    - The multiple firing for this episode is planned rather than unplanned from the original.
    - Chatri announced the final two on who they advanced instead of fire, breaking a trend done in the past episodes. In the original, Donald Trump instead announced that both members from the losing team were fired at the task's conclusion.
    - The following final task do however have a one-on-one interview, but the original does not.

=== Episode 12: Look Back to Go Forward ===
- Air date: 3 June 2021
- This episode is a recap of the first 11 weeks of the competition leading up to the finals, including never-before-seen footages.

=== Episode 13: One for All ===
- Air date: 10 June 2021
- Prologue: The final two were greeted by Chatri and congratulated them for making in the finale. After the breakfast, Zoom CEO Eric Yuan gave a chat for their loved ones. Jessica chat with her mother Daniela Ramella née Malisani, and Louie with his wife Kaye Sangalang.
- Physical task: Candidates have to undergo an exercise regimen based on the training for mixed martial arts industry, including four members from Evolve MMA.
  - Guest star: Siyar Bahadurzada
- Final task: The candidates will go for one-on-one interviews with both Chatri and Anthony Tan.
  - Guest judge: Anthony Tan, co-founder and group CEO of Grab
- Boardroom details: Before the boardroom, Tan suggested to Chatri about the criteria that "shares a value", and commented that Jessica thought that was truthful, but worried whether her action was considered; Louie was more linguistic but found doubtful when he answered about resignation on a question that what if he could not aim their end-year targets. Chatri and Niharika evaluated on both performances: Louie was respected for their sacrifices, honesty and as a supportive to the team, but criticized over his responsibilities and his strategy. Jessica was praised for her leadership skills and her deposition, but feedback about her Shoulder angel and physical stance and questioned on her "project manager" and being a tall poppy towards other candidates. They then commented on their interviews: Louie was respected on his truthfulness and steady but commented that his answers were "too perfect"; and Jessica as emotive, articulate and intelligent, but doubt on understanding the position. Chatri gave a final question on why they deserved to win: Louie replied on his interest in martial arts and potential, and Jessica with her gratitude to be on the show and is ready to serve Chatri. Chatri admitted that both candidates had performed beyond expectations and were favored on their interviews, their appearance in the show, and their potential.
- Named the ONE/Hired: Jessica Ramella - for her proven record (7-3 as opposed to Louie's 5-5, and not called on the final boardroom once at all), for her expertise, charisma, being decisive, honest and passionate, which matched Chatri's requirements for her hiring.
- Fired: Louie Sangalang - despite having a better record in terms on project manager (2-0 as opposed to Jessica's 1-0) and physical task (7-2 as opposed to 4-5), Chatri considered him as "too perfect" for the role, while his emotion and flaws on leadership lacked necessary cut to be his chief of staff, though praised him for his sacrifice and effort, and also him playing a supportive role.
- Note:
  - This is the first finale for The Apprentice franchise where the final task is solely based on interviews, instead of conducting a final task/project of their own.
  - Chatri declared Jessica by saying, "You're hired" (the standard quote for naming the winning candidate in the show) in addition to his original statement of "you are the ONE", on her victory.
