= ONE Championship =

Martial arts promoter based in Singapore

- Current season, competition or edition: 2026 in ONE Championship
- Sport: Combat sports: (MMA; Kickboxing; Muay Thai; Submission grappling)
- Founded: 14 July 2011; 15 years ago
- Owner: Group One Holdings Pte. Ltd.
- CEO: Chatri Sityodtong (Chairman and CEO)
- Director: Saurabh Mittal (Vice Chairman); Hua Fung Teh (Group President); Jesley Chua (CFO); Rich Franklin (VP); Matt Hume (SVP of Competition)
- Headquarters: 3 Fraser Street, #14-24 Singapore 189352
- Website: onefc.com

ONE Championship, formerly ONE Fighting Championship (ONE FC) until January 2015, is a multinational combat sports promotion founded on 14 July 2011 by Chatri Sityodtong and Victor Cui. Originally focused on mixed martial arts (MMA), ONE events have since incorporated muay thai, kickboxing, and submission grappling bouts. The promotion held its first event on 3 September 2011 at the Singapore Indoor Stadium, and has since held over 200 events across Asia. In 2022, parent company One Group Holdings, changed its legal operations from Singapore to the Cayman Islands.

== History ==
=== Founding and early history: 2011–2014 ===
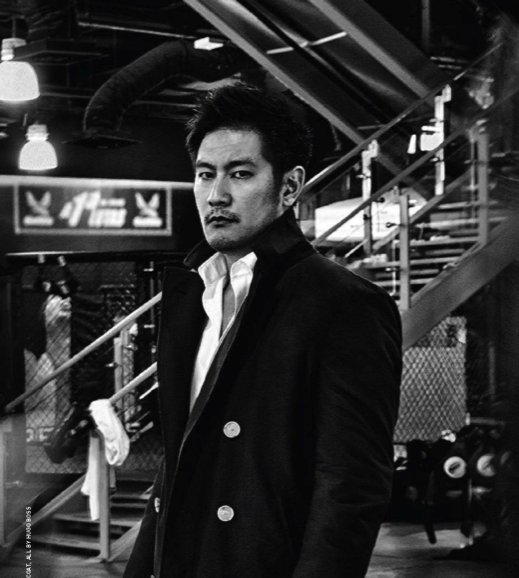
Chatri Sityodtong, founder, chairman, and CEO of One Championship

Entrepreneur Chatri Sityodtong founded One Fighting Championship (ONE FC) in July 2011 to unite Asia through martial arts, leveraging Singapore's infrastructure. The promotion debuted on 3 September 2011 with ONE FC: Champion vs. Champion, selling out the Singapore Indoor Stadium. Key milestones included the first female MMA bout in March 2012 and the crowning of inaugural champions in bantamweight (Soo Chul Kim), lightweight (Kotetsu Boku), featherweight (Honorio Banario), welterweight (Nobutatsu Suzuki), flyweight (Adriano Moraes), and middleweight (Igor Svirid) divisions between 2012 and 2014.

=== Name change and expansion: 2015–2019 ===
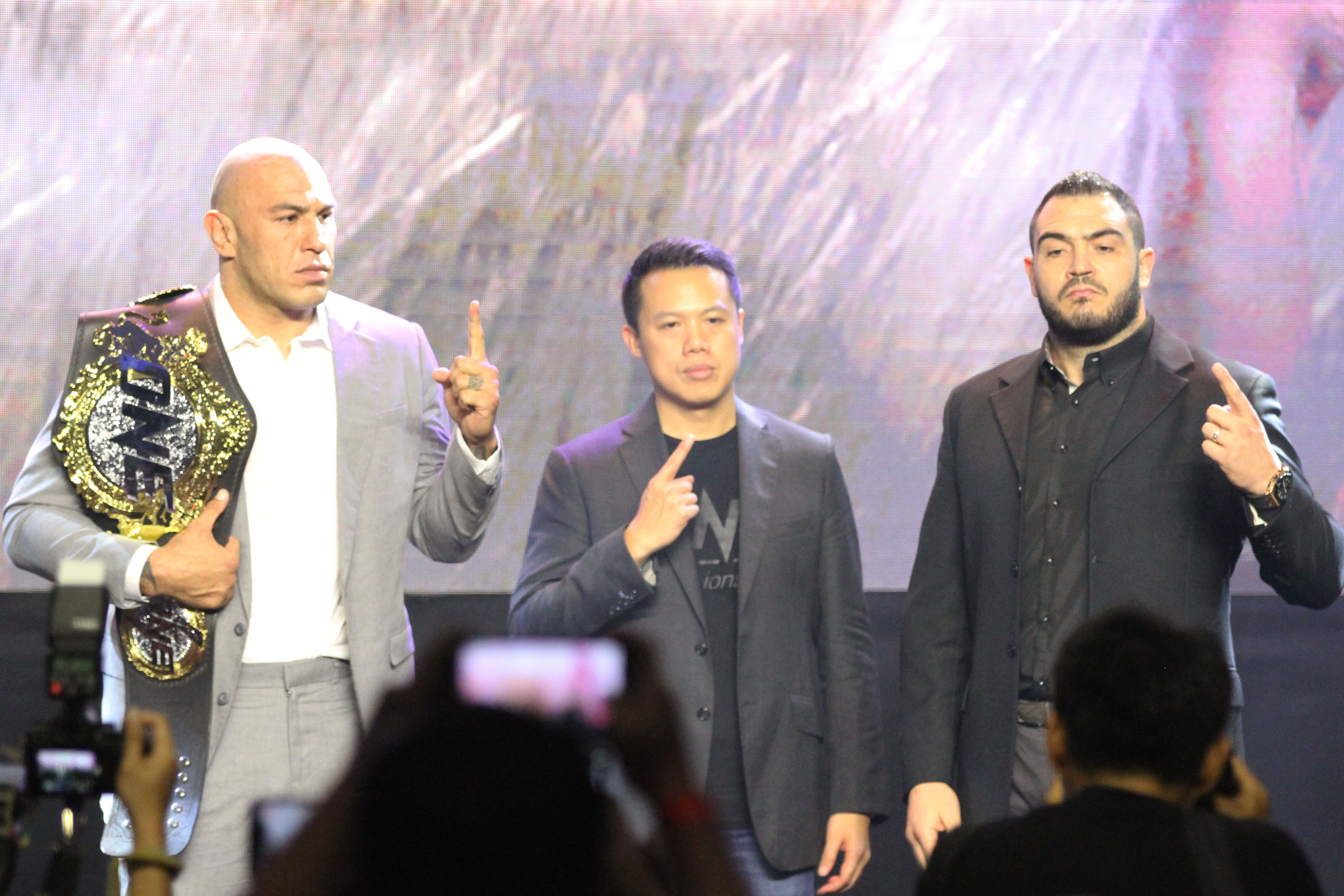
Brandon Vera, Hua Fung Teh, and Mauro Cerilli at a ONE: Conquest of Champions press conference, 2018

Rebranded as ONE Championship in 2015, the promotion expanded into new disciplines and markets. It introduced the strawweight title (Dejdamrong Sor Amnuaysirichoke, 2015), hosted its first Lethwei bout (2015), and crowned heavyweight (Brandon Vera, 2015), light heavyweight (Roger Gracie, 2016), and women's atomweight (Angela Lee, 2016) champions.

On February 12, 2018, ONE Championship announced the establishment of the ONE Super Series, which would feature kickboxing and Muay Thai bouts. The first event that featured bouts under Muay Thai and kickboxing rules was ONE: Heroes of Honor in Manila on 20 April 2018. The promotion signed notable names such as Giorgio Petrosyan, Nong-O Gaiyanghadao and Fabio Pinca to feature on the bill. Since the inception of ONE Super Series, some events have used a five-roped ring, instead of the ONE circular cage, which had been used exclusively up until 2018. The ONE Super Series kickboxing bouts adopt the oriental ruleset.

A historic 2018 trade with the UFC exchanged Ben Askren for Demetrious Johnson. The promotion also launched Muay Thai (Sam-A Gaiyanghadao, 2018) and kickboxing titles (Kai Ting Chuang, 2018), and hosted its sole boxing match (Srisaket Sor Rungvisai vs. Iran Diaz, 2018). The first ONE event to consist entirely of ONE Super Series contests was ONE Championship: Immortal Triumph in Ho Chi Minh City on 6 September 2019.

Since 2020, ONE Super Series kickboxing bouts use boxing gloves, while Muay Thai bouts use open-finger 4 oz gloves.

=== Further international expansion: 2020–Present ===
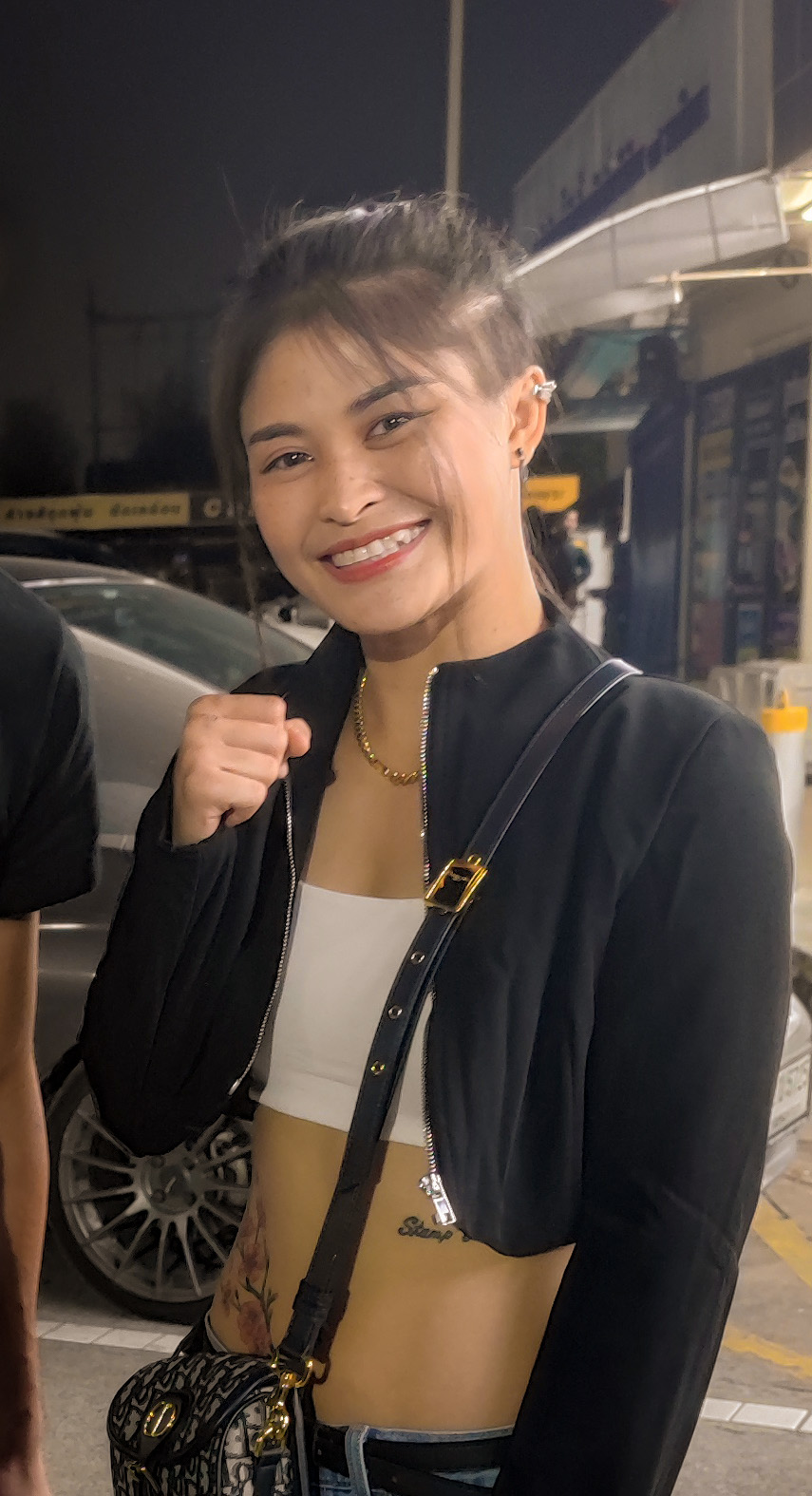
Stamp Fairtex became ONE's first three-sport champion in 2023.

ONE raised 150 million in 2021, reaching a 1.35 billion valuation, and relocated to the Cayman Islands in 2022. It expanded into submission grappling (Mikey Musumeci, 2022) and debuted in the U.S. with ONE Fight Night 10 (2023). Notable milestones included Smilla Sundell becoming the youngest champion (17) in 2022 and a 2023 agreement to host events in Qatar.

In 2023, the promotion began a new series of weekly events called ONE Friday Fights, also known as ONE Lumpinee in Thailand, at Bangkok's Lumpinee Stadium, initially scheduling 53 events there during the year; the series was predominantly centered on Muay Thai and featured established Thai fighters and emerging prospects. Since then, Muay Thai bouts became increasingly prominent, while MMA and submission grappling were pushed into the background in ONE's weekly programming, although MMA remained a major part of the promotion's international events.

== Overview and broadcasters ==
ONE Championship is operated by Group ONE Holdings, led by chairman/CEO Chatri Sityodtong, vice chairman Saurabh Mittal, president Hua Fung Teh, and CFO Jesley Chua. Matchmaking is overseen by VP of Operations Matt Hume, while former UFC champion Rich Franklin serves as a vice president. Key referees include Olivier Coste (MMA) and Elias Dolaptsis (Muay Thai/Kickboxing), with Dom Lau as ring announcer. English broadcasts feature commentators Mitch Chilson, Ray Flores, Brent Stover, and Rich Franklin, alongside guest analysts like Bas Rutten and Renzo Gracie. Former commentator Michael Schiavello departed in 2017.

Former co-founder Victor Cui left in 2022 to lead the Edmonton Elks, while ex-UFC champion Miesha Tate served as vice president from 2018 until her 2021 return to fighting.

Broadcast Partnerships ONE events air globally via networks like Vidio, Indosiar, and MDTV in Indonesia; MediaCorp Channel 5 (Singapore); RPTV/One Sports (Philippines); Workpoint TV/Channel 7 (Thailand); and AbemaTV (Japan). A 10-year deal with ESPN Star Sports began in 2012, with later agreements including Turner Sports (2018–2021 U.S. coverage on B/R Live/TNT), Amazon Prime Video (2022–2027 U.S./Canada rights), beIN Sports (2022 MENA expansion), Seven Network (2023 Australia via 7plus), ESPN (2025 New Zealand via Disney+) and Sky Sports (2023 UK/Ireland). Events also stream live on YouTube and Facebook Watch in select regions.

== Anti-doping policy ==
In August 2022, ONE Championship announced an anti-doping partnership with International Doping Tests & Management, a subsidiary of Drug Free Sport International, who will independently handle all testing of its fighters for "illegal substances", beginning with ONE 160 that month. Although the organization planned to introduce World Anti-Doping Agency standard testing in 2019, prior to its partnership with International Doping Tests & Management, ONE had not publicly drug-tested its athletes.

== Rules ==
ONE Championship employs distinct rule sets across its disciplines:

=== Mixed martial arts ===
Using the Global Martial Arts Rule Set, bouts feature 4-ounce MMA gloves. Non-title fights have three 5-minute rounds; title fights extend to five rounds. Victory methods include KO, submission, verbal tapout, TKO, disqualification, or judges' decision. Judges prioritize near-finishes, damage, striking/control, takedowns, and aggression.

Illegal actions include strikes to the groin, throat, spine, or back of the head/neck, head stomps, small joint manipulation, and spiking takedowns. Soccer kicks to grounded opponents, initially permitted under PRIDE-inspired rules, were banned in 2016 due to reputational concerns.

=== Kickboxing and Muay Thai ===
Governed by Global Kickboxing/Muay Thai Rule Sets, glove sizes vary by weight (8-oz for ≤65.8kg in kickboxing; 4-oz for Muay Thai). Muay Thai permits elbows, clinches, sweeps, and throws. Matches are 3–5 rounds (3 minutes each). Wins occur via KO (including throws in Muay Thai), TKO (4 total/3 round knockdowns), decision, or disqualification. Judges use the 10-point must system, prioritizing knockdowns, damage, clean strikes, and aggression.

=== Submission grappling ===
Under the Global Submission Grappling Rule Set, matches are a single 10-minute round. Victories come via submission, verbal tapout, or referee/corner stoppage. Judges decide based on submission attempts ("catches"); aggression breaks ties. Yellow cards penalize stalling, restricting offenders to submission-only wins. Pre-May 2022, matches required submissions for victory, with draws after 12 minutes.

== Weight divisions ==
ONE Championship currently uses ten different weight classes:

Weight class name	Upper limit			Gender
Weight class name	in pounds (lb)	in kilograms (kg)	in stone (st)	Gender
Atomweight	115	52.2	8.2	Male / Female
Strawweight	125	56.7	8.9	Male / Female
Flyweight	135	61.2	9.6	Male / Female
Bantamweight	145	65.8	10.4	Male
Featherweight	155	70.3	11.1	Male
Lightweight	170	77.1	12.1	Male
Welterweight	185	83.9	13.2	Male
Middleweight	205	93	14.6	Male
Light Heavyweight	225	102.1	16.1	Male
Heavyweight	265 (Note: Unlimited in Kickboxing and Muay Thai)	120.2	18.9	Male

ONE weigh-ins include a hydration test.

The change took place after the death of 21-year-old Chinese fighter, Yang Jian Bing (who was supposed to face Geje Eustaquio) on 11 December 2015, due to dehydration by weight-cutting in the Philippines.

The promotion banned weight-cutting by dehydration in order to promote fighter safety. The promotion's revised policy on weight mandated that athletes are monitored in their training camps, and have urine specific gravity tests to ensure they are hydrated up to three hours ahead of their bouts.

The new system was well received by athletes in the organization, as well as other stakeholders in the MMA industry.

However, in recent years, this system has been met with criticism after fighters failed hydration but then missed weight after making hydration, resulting in stripped titles and canceled fights.

== Events ==
ONE's event schedule is divided between several distinct series, including its flagship Numbered Series. The ONE Fight Night events are premium cards aimed particularly at the North American market and are distributed by Amazon Prime Video in the United States and Canada. The weekly Friday Fights series is held at Lumpinee Stadium in Bangkok. The Inner Circle is a weekly, premium livestreamed event series. Road to ONE serves as a global recruitment league for developing talent. In 2026, ONE Championship launched ONE Samurai, a monthly PPV event series aimed at the Japanese market.

List of ONE Championship seasons by year
2011 in ONE Championship
2012 in ONE Championship
2013 in ONE Championship
2014 in ONE Championship
2015 in ONE Championship
2016 in ONE Championship
2017 in ONE Championship
2018 in ONE Championship
2019 in ONE Championship
2020 in ONE Championship
2021 in ONE Championship
2022 in ONE Championship
2023 in ONE Championship
2024 in ONE Championship
2025 in ONE Championship
2026 in ONE Championship

=== ONE Warrior Series ===
In November 2017, it was announced that ONE VP Rich Franklin would head up a competition called the ONE Warrior Series, searching for up-and-coming martial artists in Asia. The prize is a six-figure contract with the organization, with the winner determined based on their performance instead of victories. The most recent edition of the ONE Warrior series in its initial format was ONE Warrior Series 10, which aired on February 19, 2020.

==== ONE Warrior Series: Philippines ====
On September 12, 2022, ONE Warrior Series made a brief return as a reality television show titled ONE Warrior Series: Philippines. The show featured 16 mixed martial arts fighters in the Philippines competing for a $100,000 contract to compete in ONE Championship. Team Lakay members Joshua Pacio and Geje Eustaquio were featured on the show as coaches. The show premiered on September 18, 2022 and featured 12 episodes.

=== ONE Infinity ===
On 13 February 2020, ONE announced the launch of the "Infinity" series, events consisting of at least three championship fights and a minimum of 12 world champions.

=== ONE Lumpinee / ONE Friday Fights ===
In September 2022, ONE announced a partnership with the Royal Thai Army to hold at least 52 shows in 2023 at the Lumpinee Stadium in Bangkok, Thailand. The weekly events started with ONE Friday Fights 1 on 20 January 2023, where Nong-O Gaiyanghadao successfully defended his bantamweight Muay Thai title with a TKO of Alaverdi Ramazanov in the third round. The event finished as the most-watched show in prime time in Thailand, with a 3.9 rating among males 15 years old and over, according to data collected by Nielsen. It was broadcast locally on Thailand's Channel 7. The event predominately features Muay Thai, but also includes MMA and kickboxing bouts. They are broadcast live in 154 countries, and reportedly offer the highest purses in Muay Thai history.

== Roster ==
In May 2022, Sityodtong stated ONE Championship had 600 fighters in the organization.

=== Fighter salary ===
Fighter salaries in Asia are not publicly disclosed so information about ONE FC's fighter purses is not in the public domain. However, in January 2014 Ben Askren revealed that he was being paid a minimum of US$50,000 per fight as well as a US$50,000 win bonus. This was also the same amount Adriano Moraes made in his first fight against Demetrious Johnson. Following a legal dispute with his management team, Moraes signed a new contract that saw him making US$100,000 to show and US$100,000 to win, as well as a US$250,000 flat fee as champion and a US$10,000 monthly salary over two years.

Some fighter purses have been reportedly low as US$1,300 with a win bonus US$1,300, which was the amount received by Kyrgyzstani MMA fighter Anelya Toktogonova in her fight on ONE Friday Fights.

A cash bonus known as the "ONE Warrior bonus" was introduced on 9 July 2014 and implemented for the first time at ONE Fighting Championship: War of Dragons on 11 July 2014.

An award of US$50,000 is given out at the end of certain events to the fighter who impresses the most in terms of:"

- thrilling the fans with exciting action;
- demonstrating an incredible warrior spirit;
- exhibiting amazing skill, and;
- delivering a phenomenal finish.

The "ONE Warrior bonus" of $50,000 was re-introduced in January 2022, with a minimum of one bonus and a maximum of five bonuses awarded at each event.

== Rankings ==
The rankings for ONE Championship's fighters are both recorded and updated when information has been obtained from the official promotion website.

== Current champions ==
Men
Division	Champion	Since	Ref.	Defenses
Mixed martial arts
Heavyweight 265 lb (120.2 kg)	Vacant	May 15, 2026		
Light heavyweight 225 lb (102.1 kg)	Vacant	May 15, 2026		
Middleweight 205 lb (93.0 kg)	Vacant	May 15, 2026		
Welterweight 185 lb (83.9 kg)	(United States) Christian Lee	Nov 19, 2022		0
Lightweight 170 lb (77.1 kg)	(United States) Tye Ruotolo	Nov 6, 2026		0
Featherweight 155 lb (70.3 kg)	(China) Tang Kai	Aug 26, 2022		2
Bantamweight 145 lb (65.8 kg)	(Azerbaijan) Elbek Alyshov	Jul 31, 2026		0
Flyweight 135 lb (61.2 kg)	(Uzbekistan) Avazbek Kholmirzaev	Apr 29, 2026		0
Strawweight 125 lb (56.7 kg)	(Philippines) Joshua Pacio	Mar 1, 2024		2
Kickboxing
Heavyweight Above 225 lb (102.1 kg)	(Ukraine) Roman Kryklia	Jun 19, 2026		0
Light Heavyweight 225 lb (102.1 kg)	(Ukraine) Roman Kryklia	Nov 16, 2019		2
Lightweight 170 lb (77.1 kg)	(Suriname) Regian Eersel	Apr 10, 2026		0
Featherweight 155 lb (70.3 kg)	(Thailand) Superbon Singha Mawynn	Jan 6, 2025		1
Bantamweight 145 lb (65.8 kg)	(England) Jonathan Haggerty	Nov 4, 2023		3
Flyweight 135 lb (61.2 kg)	(Thailand) Superlek Kiatmuukao	Jan 14, 2023		2
Strawweight 125 lb (56.7 kg)	(Canada) Jonathan Di Bella	Oct 4, 2025		0
Muay Thai
Heavyweight Above 225 lb (102.1 kg)	(Ukraine) Roman Kryklia	Dec 8, 2023		1
Lightweight 170 lb (77.1 kg)	(Suriname) Regian Eersel	Oct 22, 2022		3
Featherweight 155 lb (70.3 kg)	(Scotland) Nico Carrillo	Jul 21, 2026		0
Bantamweight 145 lb (65.8 kg)	(Thailand) Yod-Iq Or Pimolsri	Sep 11, 2026		0
Flyweight 135 lb (61.2 kg)	(Russia) Asadula Imangazaliev	June 26, 2026		0
Strawweight 125 lb (56.7 kg)	(Thailand) Prajanchai P.K. Saenchai	Dec 22, 2023		1
Atomweight 115 lb (52.2 kg)	(Japan) Nadaka Yoshinari	November 16, 2025		2
Submission grappling
Welterweight 185 lb (83.9 kg)	(United States) Tye Ruotolo	Nov 4, 2023		3
Lightweight 170 lb (77.1 kg)	(United States) Kade Ruotolo	Oct 22, 2022		3
Flyweight 135 lb (61.2 kg)	(Brazil) Diogo Reis	Dec 6, 2025		0

Women
Division	Champion	Since	Ref.	Defenses
Mixed martial arts
Atomweight 115 lb (52.2 kg)	Vacant	June 23, 2026		
Kickboxing
Strawweight 125 lb (56.7 kg)	(Austria) Stella Hemetsberger	Feb 14, 2026		0
Atomweight 115 lb (52.2 kg)	(Thailand) Phetjeeja Lukjaoporongtom	Mar 9, 2024		2
Muay Thai
Strawweight 125 lb (56.7 kg)	(Austria) Stella Hemetsberger	Sep 6, 2025	–	1
Atomweight 115 lb (52.2 kg)	(Brazil) Allycia Rodrigues	Aug 28, 2020		5

== Tournament winners ==
ONE Grand Prix Champions

Division	Champion	Since
Bantamweight	(Japan) Masakatsu Ueda	31 May 2013 (ONE FC: Rise to Power)
Flyweight	(United States) Demetrious Johnson	13 October 2019 (ONE: Century − Part 1)
Lightweight	(United States) Christian Lee	13 October 2019 (ONE: Century − Part 1)
Featherweight (Kickboxing)	(Italy) Giorgio Petrosyan	13 October 2019 (ONE: Century − Part 2)
Featherweight (Kickboxing)	(Belarus) Chingiz Allazov	26 March 2022 (ONE: X)
Bantamweight (Muay Thai)	(Thailand) Rodlek P.K.Saenchai	28 August 2020 (ONE: A New Breed)
Atomweight	(Thailand) Stamp Fairtex	3 December 2021 (ONE: Winter Warriors)
Heavyweight (Kickboxing)	(Ukraine) Roman Kryklia	19 November 2022 (ONE 163)

Malaysia GP Champions

Division	Champion	Since
Featherweight	(Malaysia) A.J. Lias Mansor	15 November 2013 (ONE FC: Warrior Spirit)

Cambodia GP Champions

Division	Champion	Since
Featherweight	(Cambodia) Samang Dun	12 September 2014 (ONE FC: Rise of the Kingdom)

China GP Champions

Division	Champion	Since
Featherweight (Beijing)	(China) Li Kai Wen	19 December 2014 (ONE FC: Dynasty of Champions (Beijing))
Flyweight (Beijing)	(China) Wei Bin Li	19 December 2014 (ONE FC: Dynasty of Champions (Beijing))
Featherweight (Guangzhou)	(China) Huang Di Yuan	20 June 2015 (ONE: Dynasty of Champions (Guangzhou))
Flyweight (Guangzhou)	(China) Wu Ze	20 June 2015 (ONE: Dynasty of Champions (Guangzhou))
Featherweight (Beijing)	(China) Yang Sen	21 November 2015 (ONE FC: Dynasty of Champions (Beijing II))
Bantamweight (Changsha)	(China) Ma Hao Bin	23 January 2016 (ONE: Dynasty of Champions (Changsha))
Flyweight (Hefei)	(China) Huo You Xia Bu	2 July 2016 (ONE: Dynasty of Champions (Anhui))

Myanmar GP Champions

Division	Champion	Since
Featherweight	(Myanmar) Tha Pyay Nyo	18 July 2015 (ONE: Kingdom of Warriors)
Lightweight	(Myanmar) Thway Thit Aung	18 July 2015 (ONE: Kingdom of Warriors)
Featherweight	(Myanmar) Phoe Thaw	7 October 2016 (ONE: State of Warriors)

== ONE Championship records ==
Record	Fighter	Number
Youngest fighter in ONE debut	(Thailand) Supergirl Jaroonsak	16 years, 9 months
Oldest fighter in ONE debut	(Brazil) Renzo Gracie	51 years, 4 months
Youngest champion	(Sweden) Smilla Sundell	17 years, 5 months
Youngest title challenger	(China) Zhang Peimian	19 years, 0 months
Oldest champion	(Mongolia) Jadamba Narantungalag	38 years, 10 months
Oldest title challenger	(Mongolia) Jadamba Narantungalag	43 years, 3 months
Longest championship reign	(United States) Angela Lee	2703 days
Shortest championship reign	(Japan) Shinya Aoki	47 days
Most championship reigns	(Brazil) Adriano Moraes, (United States) Christian Lee and (Philippines) Joshua Pacio	3
Most fights	(Philippines) Eduard Folayang	25
Most wins	(United States) Christian Lee	17
Most finishes	(United States) Christian Lee	16
Most knockouts	(United States) Christian Lee	12
Most submissions	(Japan) Shinya Aoki	10
Most decision Wins	(Thailand) Rodtang Jitmuangnon	11
Most title fight wins	(Brazil) Bibiano Fernandes	11
Most title fights	(Brazil) Bibiano Fernandes	13
Most cumulative title defenses	(Brazil) Bibiano Fernandes	8
Most consecutive title defenses	(Brazil) Bibiano Fernandes, (China) Xiong Jing Nan and (Thailand) Nong-O Gaiyanghadao	7
Longest winning streak	(Thailand) Rodtang Jitmuangnon	14
Total Fight Time	(China) Xiong Jing Nan	3 hours, 13 minutes, 48 seconds.
Fastest knockout	(Russia) Timofey Nastyukhin and (Thailand) Capitan Petchyindee	0:06
Fastest submission	(Turkey) Dagi Arslanaliev	0:26
Fastest title fight knockout	(United States) Brandon Vera	0:26
Latest title fight knockout	(Sweden) Zebaztian Kadestam	24:32
Fastest title fight submission	(Russia) Marat Gafurov	0:41

== ONE Hall of Fame ==
Image	Country	Name	Date of Induction	Ref.	Event of Induction	ONE recognized accolades
	USA	Demetrious Johnson	September 6, 2024		ONE 168	ONE Flyweight MMA Champion with one successful title defense. 2019 ONE Flyweight World Grand Prix Champion. 2022 MMA Knockout of the Year.
	Brazil	Bibiano Fernandes	March 23, 2025		ONE 172	Two-time ONE Bantamweight MMA Champion with 8 successful title defenses, and former ONE Interim Bantamweight Champion. Named in Sherdog’s 2011 All-Violence team.
	Myanmar	Aung La Nsang	November 16, 2025		ONE 173	ONE Middleweight MMA Champion with 3 successful title defenses ONE Light Heavyweight MMA Champion with 1 successful title defense. 2018 International Fighter of the Year from the World MMA Awards.
	Japan	Takeru Segawa	October 17, 2026		ONE Samurai 4	ONE Interim Flyweight Kickboxing Champion 2024 ONE Championship Fight of the Year vs. (Superlek Kiatmuu9) 2025 ONE Championship Victoria Lee Award

== Cross-promotional partnerships ==
In 2017, ONE entered into a partnership with World Lethwei Championship parties agreed on sending athletes to fight in each other's organization.

In January 2019, ONE entered into a partnership with Shooto, according to which Shooto champions would be given a contract with ONE Championship.

On February 18, 2021, ONE partnered with American promotion Ringside United Fighting (RUF Nation). The partnership saw RUF hosting a Road to ONE 16-man heavyweight MMA tournament, with the winner getting a $100,000 contract to compete in ONE Championship.

On November 19, 2023, ONE partnered with the UK-based Muay Thai promotion Hitman Fight League. The partnership will see Hitman Fight League host two Road to ONE four-man tournaments, with the winners receiving a £5,000 cash prize and the opportunity to compete on ONE Friday Fights at Lumpinee Stadium.

== Controversies ==
Former ONE Championship fighter Herbert Burns has alleged that the promotion shows favoritism to athletes signed to Evolve MMA, which was founded by ONE CEO Chatri Sityodtong. After five straight victories, he claimed that it had been agreed that he would fight for the championship, but after leaving Evolve in September 2015, he was "punished" by being sidelined for next two years. Burns said he then accepted non-title fights without being 100 percent physically because he needed money after the time off.

Other former fighters have also expressed frustration with getting fights with ONE Championship. After parting ways with them in December 2023, former ONE Bantamweight Champion Bibiano Fernandes urged fighters to think twice about signing with the promotion. "I wasn't mad at them. Do I think they could have offered me more fights? One-hundred percent. I was out for three years basically and they could have offered me more fights." Fernandes went on to say, "I'm a mixed martial arts fighter but they're doing business. They only think about business, you know? What can I do?".

After leaving the company, former ONE two-division champion Reinier de Ridder also urged fighters not to sign with the promotion. "It's that simple. You should not. There's nothing there. There's no fights. You're just wrong if you do this, if you sign there, this is a bad mistake." After losing the light heavyweight title in December 2022, De Ridder did not fight for the entirety of 2023 before returning to defend the middleweight title in March 2024 in what was his last fight with ONE Championship. "It's been a bad couple of years. The stress I've been put through. The stress my family's been put through. To even just get fights, it hasn't been nice. It's hard for me to talk bad because I had a couple of good years at ONE as well. In the beginning, they treated me well. Over the past couple of years, it's been really bad."

== See also ==
- List of ONE bonus award recipients
- The Apprentice: ONE Championship Edition
