= Manyata Embassy Business Park =

Business park in Bangalore, India

Coordinates: 13.0502491°N 77.6234169°E

Embassy Manyata Business Park
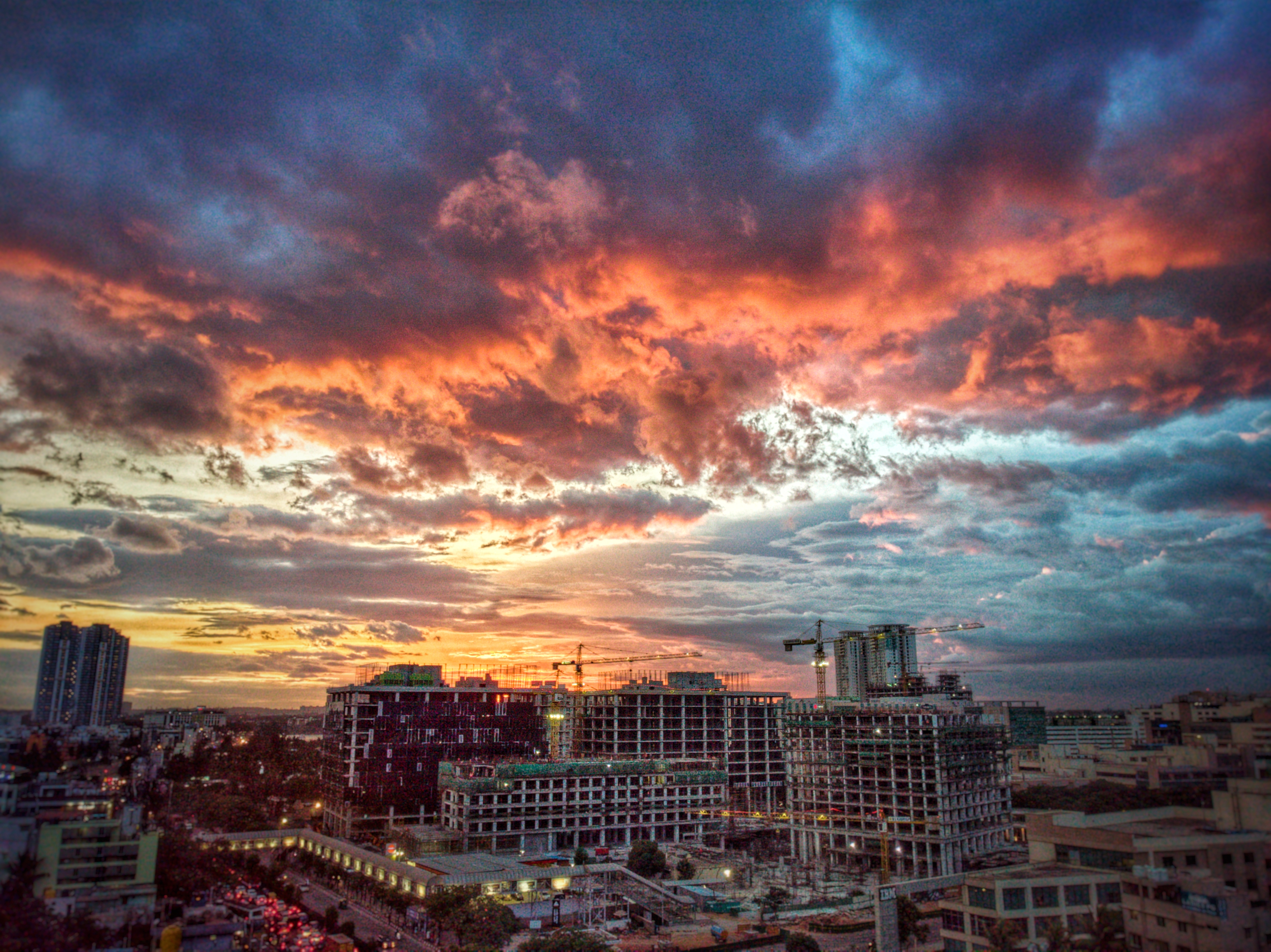
- Aerial view of Manyata Embassy Business Park
- Industry: Information technology
- Founded: 2001
- Headquarters: Bangalore, Karnataka, India
- Area served: 9.8 million sq. ft.
- Owner: Embassy Group and others
- Number of employees: 150,000+
- Parent: Embassy Office Parks (Embassy Group)
- Website: embassyofficeparks.com/park/embassy-manyata/

Embassy Manyata Business Park (also called Manyata Tech Park) is a software technology park in Bangalore, Karnataka, India. The park is situated in Nagavara (near Hebbal) on Outer Ring Road, and has a building area of 9.8 million square feet. The park is spread over 300 acres (1.2 km²).

== Occupancy ==
Manyata Embassy Business Park has a workforce of more than 150,000 professionals, as of November 2017. Some of the tenant companies of the tech park are Cognizant, L Brands, Victoria's Secret, Lowe's, Cerner, Hudson's Bay Company, Harman, Rolls-Royce, IBM, Justdial.com, Voonik, GLOBALFOUNDRIES, Larsen & Toubro, NXP Semiconductors, Nokia Networks, Philips, Alcatel-Lucent, Fidelity Investments, Target Corporation, Qualitest, Northern Trust, Nvidia, iTS, WSP, illumina and AXA.

== Infrastructure ==
In February 2017, 15 acres (6 hectares) of the park were allotted for a garden where employees could grow food during their free time. In January 2018, a rooftop football arena, covering an area of 13,000 square feet (1,200 m²), was opened.

In June 2018, the Embassy Group signed a deal to build a flyover between Nagawara lake and Thanisandra junction, which would provide direct access to the park.

An 85-acre (34 hectare) residential enclave called Manyata Residency is located behind the park.

== Awards ==
- The Best IT Park Award by the NDTV Property Awards 2013
