= RattanIndia =

Indian electric power company

RattanIndia Enterprises Limited
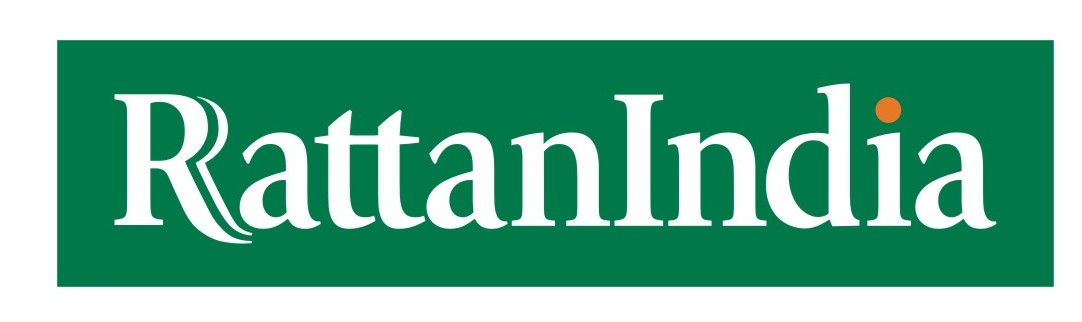
- Type: Public
- Industry: Holding company; Venture incubator
- Founded: November 9, 2010; 16 years ago
- Area served: India
- Key people: Rajiv Rattan (Chairman); Anjali Rattan Nashier (Business Chairperson)
- Products: Electric motorcycles; Drones & UAVs; E-commerce retail; D2C consumer fashion; Digital lending tech
- Parent: RattanIndia Group
- Subsidiaries: Revolt Motors (100%); Cocoblu Retail Limited (100%); NeoSky India Limited (100%); Neobrands Limited (100%); Throttle Aerospace Systems (TAS)
- Website: www.rattanindia.com

RattanIndia Enterprises Ltd., is an Indian company that is involved in the energy sector.

The traditional focus of the company was on coal and thermal power; however, the company has expanded its scope more recently, focusing more on emerging technologies and e-commerce.

The company supplies electricity to Maharashtra state and uses coal from South Coalfields Limited and Mahanadi Coalfields Limited.

== History ==
Rattan India was the outcome of the split of Indiabulls where the energy component was named as RattanIndia in 2014. The company is listed on National Stock Exchange and Bombay Stock Exchange. Brickwork Ratings provided the rating for the Bank Loan Facilities of aggregating to Rs.7617.99 Crs in October 2020.

RattanIndia has two thermal power plants: the first is the Nashik power plant that was reported stranded in 2020 due to no long-term purchase agreements and conflicts on land acquisition. The other power plant is in Amravati that was commissioned in 2015. Amravati power plant was in debt and Goldman Sachs Varde partners took over the Rs 4050 crores against 15 percent equity in 2019.

The company was also involved in solar energy but that component was sold to GIP for Rs 1067 crore in September 2020 and the company exited the solar business.

=== Acquisition of Revolt Motors ===
In October 2022, RattanIndia Enterprises Ltd announced that they would be acquiring the electric motorcycle company Revolt Motors for an undisclosed figure. The takeover was completed in January 2023.

== Allegations of irregularity ==
There have been allegations of irregularities on RattanIndia by Lone Star Funds with which the company had formed a finance company.
