= Sameer Gehlaut =

Indian businessman (born 1974)

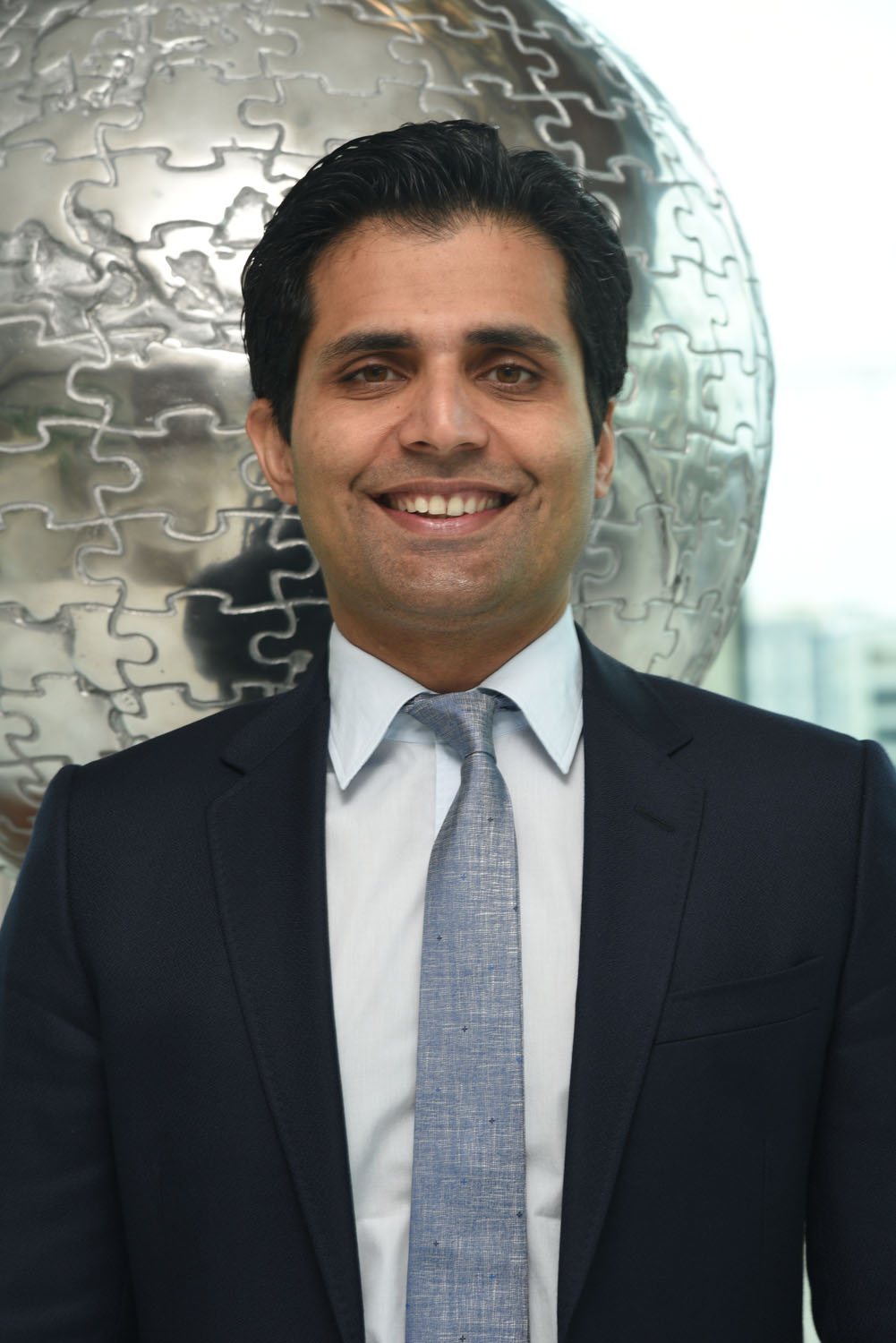
- Gehlaut in 2015
- Born: 3 March 1974 (age 52); Rohtak, Haryana, India
- Citizenship: Indian
- Education: Indian Institute of Technology, Delhi
- Occupations: Chairman and founder of Indiabulls Group
- Spouse: Divya S Gehlaut
- Children: 2

Sameer Gehlaut (born 3 March 1974) is an Indo-British entrepreneur and investor. He is the founder and chairman of the Indiabulls Group, a financial services conglomerate.

== Early life and education ==
Gehlaut was born in Rohtak, Haryana, on 3 March 1974. His mother Krishna Gahlawat is a politician, who was part of the Haryana Vikas Party and the Indian National Congress, before joining the Bharatiya Janata Party in 2014.

Gehlaut graduated in mechanical engineering from the Indian Institute of Technology, New Delhi in 1995.

== Career ==
=== Indiabulls Housing Finance (now Sammaan Capital) ===
In 1999, Gehlaut co-founded Indiabulls as an online stock brokerage, starting operations from a small office in Delhi with two college friends from IIT. During this time, he was its largest shareholder. The company went public in September 2004 with steel baron Lakshmi Mittal and hedge fund Farallon Capital as early investors. In 2005, Indiabulls acquired defunct mill properties in Central Mumbai (Jupiter Mills and Elphinstone Mills), which led to the creation of Indiabulls Real Estate (IBREL). It operated commercial and residential projects in Mumbai, Delhi and London. Indiabulls set up power generation projects in the late 2000s.

In 2014, the Indiabulls Group was split between the three co-founders, with Gehlaut retaining control of Indiabulls Housing Finance, Indiabulls Real Estate, Indiabulls Securities and Indiabulls Wholesale Services. During Gehlaut’s tenure as chairman, Indiabulls Housing Finance became India's second biggest mortgage lender. Indiabulls Housing disbursed over $35 billion to more than 500,000 retail and corporate borrowers during Gehlaut's two decade tenure as Chairman and returned $1.8 billion to shareholders in dividends

In 2015, Gehlaut led a $100 million investment in OakNorth Bank through Indiabulls Housing Finance, which created more than 22,500 new jobs across the UK.

In 2016, Gehlaut was named in the Panama Papers; an Indian Express report alleged that Gehlaut had acquired real estate properties in London through a chain of family-owned offshore entities without requisite public disclosures. Gehlaut said he had paid all taxes and made full disclosures.

Gehlaut resigned from the board of Indiabulls Real Estate in October 2021 and the board of Indiabulls Housing Finance in March 2022. Gehlaut exited Indiabulls Housing Finance by selling his remaining stake in 2023.

In February 2024, the Delhi High Court dismissed a Public Interest Litigation filed in 2019 seeking an investigation into alleged illegalities involving Gehlaut. The court, in its judgment, stated that it found “no merit” in the petition.

In March 2026, International Holding Company Abu Dhabi Developmental Holding Company (PJSC) acquired strategic control of Sammaan Capital. Through its affiliate Avenir Investment RSC Ltd, IHC secured a 41.5% stake via preferential allotment, with an initial tranche of ₹5,652 crore (US$590 million) to be scaled upto $1.2 billion.

== Indiabulls Real Estate ==
In 2006, Gehlaut founded Indiabulls Real Estate Limited, delivered over 15 million square feet office and residential developments in Mumbai and Gurugram. He sold one Indiabulls Center and Indiabulls Finance Center for $2 billion to Blackstone Inc. in the largest real estate transaction in India in 2018. Subsequently merged with NAM Estates, a joint venture of Blackstone and the Embassy Group.

== Philanthropy ==
Sameer Gehlaut has undertaken personal philanthropic efforts distinct from corporate social responsibility programs. In 2022, he and his family featured on the EdelGive Hurun India Philanthropy List, which recognizes individuals donating Rs. 5 crore in personal capacity beyond mandatory CSR requirements.

=== Indiabulls Foundation ===
The Indiabulls Foundation was established in 2010 by Sameer Gehlaut as the corporate social responsibility (CSR) arm of the Indiabulls Group, aimed at addressing social challenges through structured philanthropy. Foundation provided support to over 7.5 million people in India.

== GB bank ==
Gehlaut became the Director of GB Bank in 2024. Since the acquisition, he scaled the bank to over £2 billion in retail deposits, achieving profitability and establishing it as one of the UK's fastest-growing challenger banks.

GB Bank holds a full UK banking licence and provides tailored property development loans to regional property developers, businesses and construction companies.

Gehlaut owns majority shares in GB Bank's arm Spring AI, which provides a CFO Agent that does cash flow forecasting and other functions of a CFO for SME sector including revenue-linked, non dilutive funding anchored to real-time business data — aligning lender success directly with merchant performance.

== Clivedale ==
In November 2019, Gehlaut was named in a quid pro quo loan case, along with Yes Bank's Rana Kapoor family. In March 2020, days after he left for London, the Enforcement Directorate issued a summons to Gehlaut in relation to the case; Gehlaut said he was unable to join the investigation citing the COVID-19 lockdown.

After founding Clivedale, Gehlaut resides in London, where he has invested in multiple high-end real estate projects through his family office called Clivedale. Clivedale Group, founded by Gehlaut, has developed some of London’s most prestigious addresses, including - The Mandarin Oriental Mayfair, The Mansion, Marylebone, Mayfair Park Residences, and 73-77 Brook Street.

Moneycontrol reported in November 2025 that Clivedale is a fintech company which claimed to have £2.5 billion in retail deposits.

In December 2025, amid an Enforcement Directorate investigation, the EOW registered a first information report against Gehlaut, DLF, Choradia and others for Indiabulls Housing loan disbursals to corporate groups when Gehlaut was Chairman. These loans were repaid by the corporate groups.

== Personal life ==
Gehlaut is married to Divya S Gehlaut, the daughter of politician Sumita Singh, a former two-term Congress MLA from Karnal, Haryana.

Gehlaut's brother Narendra Gehlaut is married to politician Jyoti Mirdha, a former Congress MP from Nagaur, Rajasthan.

== Awards & honors ==
Gehlaut has received numerous awards and accolades, which include the Ernst & Young Entrepreneur of the Year Award in 2006 and the CNBC-TV18 India Business Leader of the Year Award in 2010.

- 2009 Rajiv Gandhi Award
