= Chatri Sityodtong =

Thai businessman and CEO of ONE Championship

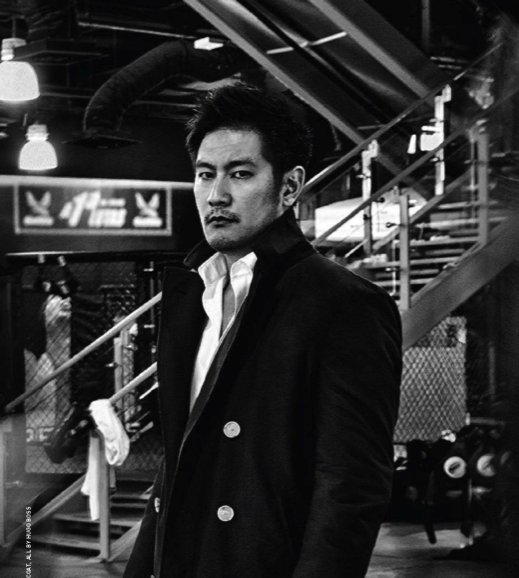
- Born: Chatri Trisiripisal; July 21, 1971 (age 55); Thailand
- Native name: ชาตรี ศิษย์ยอดธง
- Height: 5 ft 10 in (1.78 m)
- Weight: 170 lb (77 kg; 12 st 2 lb)
- Style: Muay Thai, Brazilian Jiu-Jitsu
- Rank: Kru in Muay Thai; Black belt in Brazilian Jiu-Jitsu under Renzo Gracie

Other information
- University: Tufts University (BA); Harvard Business School (MBA)
- Website: yodchatri.com

Chatri Trisiripisal (Thai: ชาตรี ตรีศิริพิศาล, RTGS: Chatri Trisiriphisan), known by the ring names Chatri Sityodtong (Thai: ชาตรี ศิษย์ยอดธง, RTGS: Chatri Sit-yotthong) and Yodchatri Sityodtong (Thai: ยอดชาตรี ศิษย์ยอดธง, RTGS: Yotchatri Sit-yotthong), is a Thai entrepreneur and martial arts instructor based in Singapore.

He is best known for being the founder, chairman, and chief executive officer of Singapore-based combat sports promotion ONE Championship. He is also the star of The Apprentice: ONE Championship Edition.

== Early life and education ==
In 1971, Sityodtong was born to a Thai father and Japanese mother and was raised in Thailand. He graduated with a B.A. in Economics from Tufts University in 1994. His family went bankrupt during the Asian Financial Crisis and his father eventually abandoned the family. Sityodtong moved to the United States, pursuing an education for a higher-paying job. To put himself through Harvard Business School, Sityodtong delivered Chinese food and taught Muay Thai to make ends meet before graduating with his MBA in 1999.

Sityodtong emigrated to Singapore in the mid-2000s, and has lived there ever since.

=== Martial arts background ===
Chatri started Muay Thai as a child under Kru Yodtong Senanan of Sityodtong Camp in Pattaya, Thailand. Senanan eventually gave Chatri the ring name Yodchatri Sityodtong. A veteran of over 30 fights, Sityodtong's last professional Muay Thai fight was in 2008 in Thailand. He is a certified senior Muay Thai instructor under Senanan. Before his death, Senanan appointed him as one of 4 conservators of Sityodtong Muay Thai in the world.

Sityodtong started training in Brazilian Jiu-Jitsu in 2005 under Renzo Gracie at the Renzo Gracie Academy in New York City. He earned his blue and purple belts under the Renzo Gracie banner from BJJ World Champions Rafael Gordinho Lima and Leandro Brodinho Issa respectively. With Renzo Gracie's blessing, BJJ World Champion Alex Silva awarded Sityodtong his brown belt in 2021.

In 2019, Sityodtong was inducted into the Black Belt Magazine Hall of Fame.

In 2024 Renzo Gracie awarded Sityodtong his BJJ black belt live on air at ONE 168 in Denver, Colorado.

== Career ==
Chatri started as an investment analyst at Fidelity Investments covering a variety of industries. He later launched Nextdoor Networks with Yau Soon Loo, a classmate at Harvard. Nextdoor Networks was a San Francisco based startup provider of e-commerce infrastructure. Sityodtong was a Managing Director at Maverick Capital, a US$12 billion hedge fund. In 2005, backed by Farallon Capital, Sityodtong launched Izara Capital Management, a US$500 million New York hedge fund. After a decade on Wall Street, he retired. In 2008, he founded Evolve MMA, a chain of martial arts academies in Asia.

In 2011, Chatri founded ONE Championship and currently serves as its chairman and CEO. Under his leadership, ONE was named Asia's largest global sports media property by Forbes, while Nielsen ranks ONE amongst the world's top 10 biggest sports media properties in terms of viewership and engagement.

In 2021, Sityodtong starred in The Apprentice: ONE Championship Edition. The show won Asia's Best Reality TV Series at the 2021 Asian Academy Awards.

In August 2022, Sityodtong accepted an invitation by the Royal Thai Army to become a promoter at the prestigious Lumpinee Boxing Stadium in Bangkok, Thailand.

=== Philanthropy ===
Sityodtong supports Global Poverty Project through his companies. He is an active donor to Boys' Town Home, a charity that serves underprivileged children and youths at risk. Sityodtong also supports the Singapore Children's Society and children with cancer with Children's Cancer Foundation.
