= Embassy Group =

Privately held real estate developer based in Bengaluru, India

- Type: Public
- Industry: Real estate
- Founded: 1993
- Headquarters: Bengaluru, Karnataka, India
- Number of employees: 473
- Website: embassygroup.com

Embassy Group is an Indian real estate developer based in Bengaluru, established in 1993. The group is into real estate development for verticals like commercial, residential, hospitality, industrial warehouse spaces, services, retail and education. The company has developed projects in Indian cities such as Bengaluru, Chennai, Hyderabad, Pune, Coimbatore, Trivandrum, and two countries overseas (Serbia and Malaysia). Embassy Group is headed by Jitu Virwani, Chairman & Managing Director of the group. Embassy also operates a real estate investment trust (REIT), called Embassy Office Parks REIT, which is the first listed REIT in India and Asia's largest office REIT by area.

== History ==
In 2024, India's securities regulator SEBI directed Embassy Office Parks Management Services (the manager of Embassy Office Parks REIT Ltd) to suspend Aravind Maiya as CEO after an investigation by the National Financial Reporting Authority (NFRA) found "serious lapses" and financial mismanagement by Maiya when he was an auditor for Coffee Day Enterprises in 2018–19. After some resistance, Maiya stepped down as CEO and was instead appointed as the Head of Strategy.

In December 2024, Embassy REIT raised ₹1,000 crore through debt refinancing.

== Projects ==
=== Commercial ===
- Manyata Embassy Business Park, Bengaluru
- Embassy Tech Zone, Pune
- Embassy Splendid TechZone, Chennai
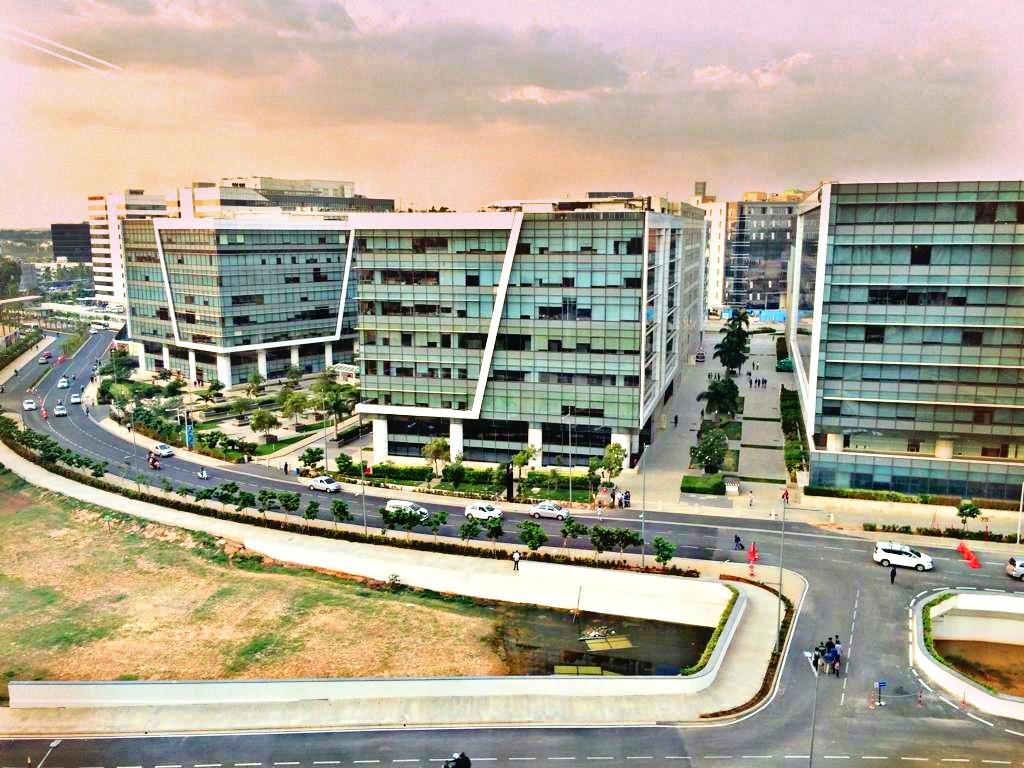
Embassy TechVillage, Bangalore

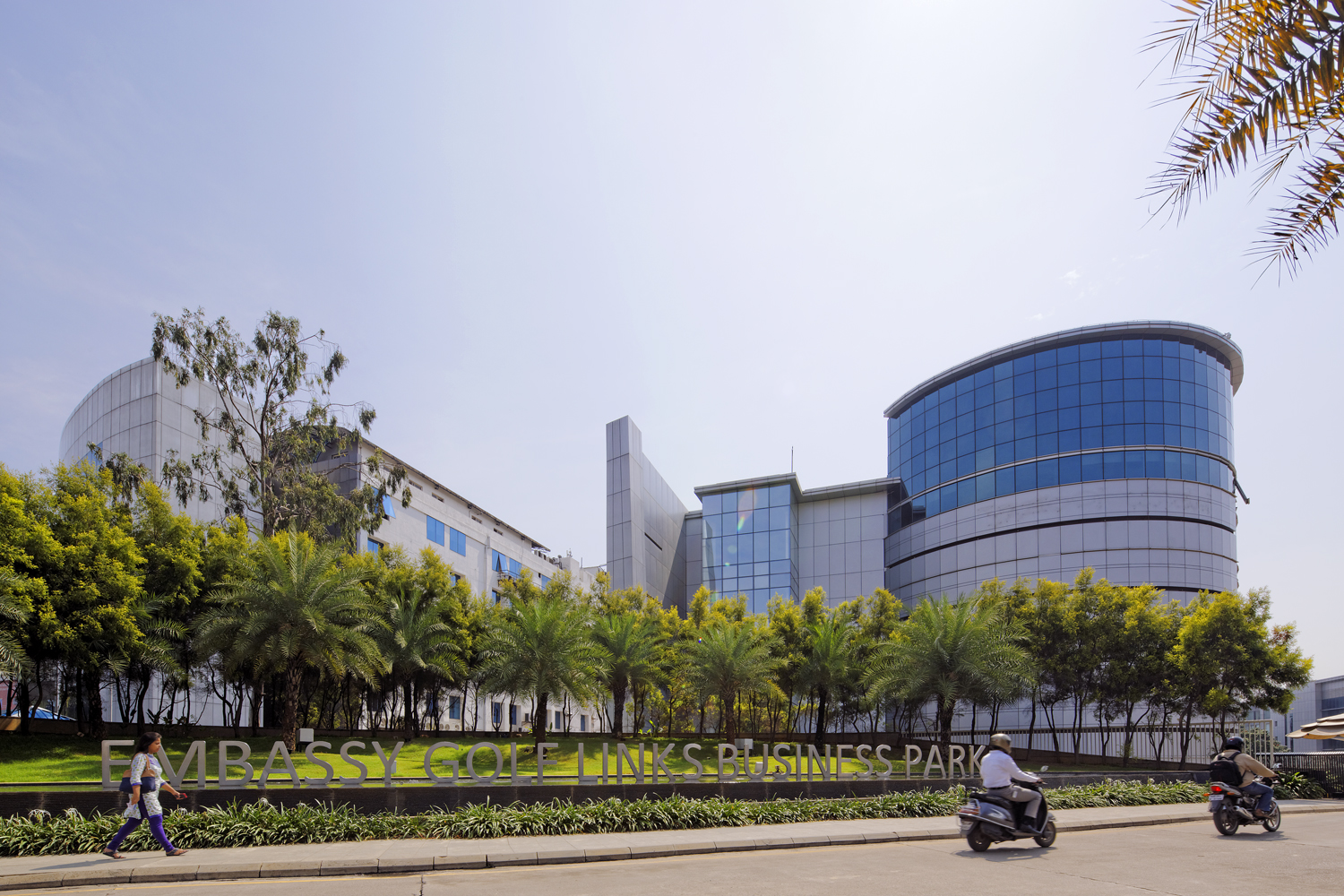
Embassy GolfLinks Business Park, Bangalore

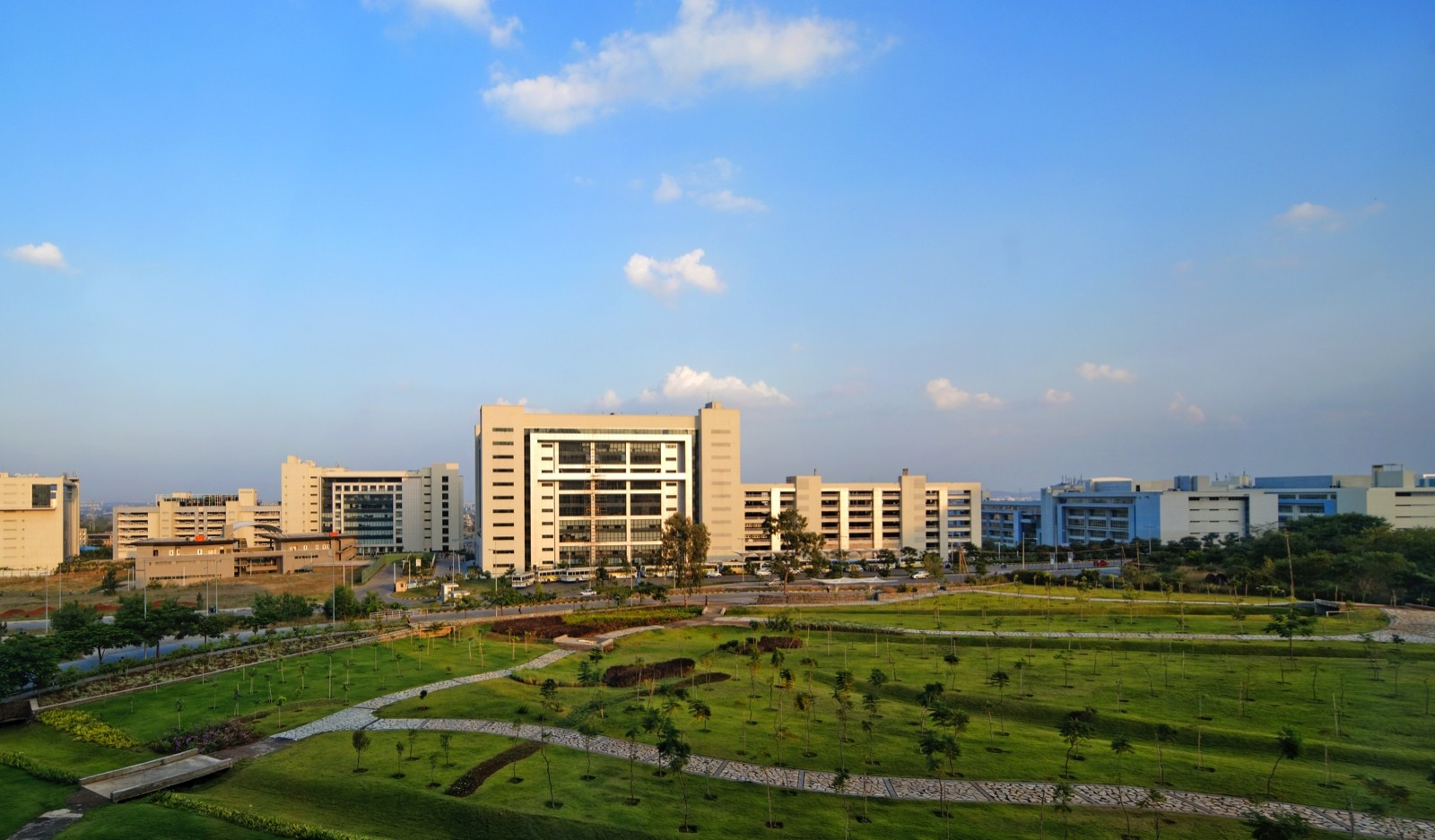
Embassy TechZone, Pune

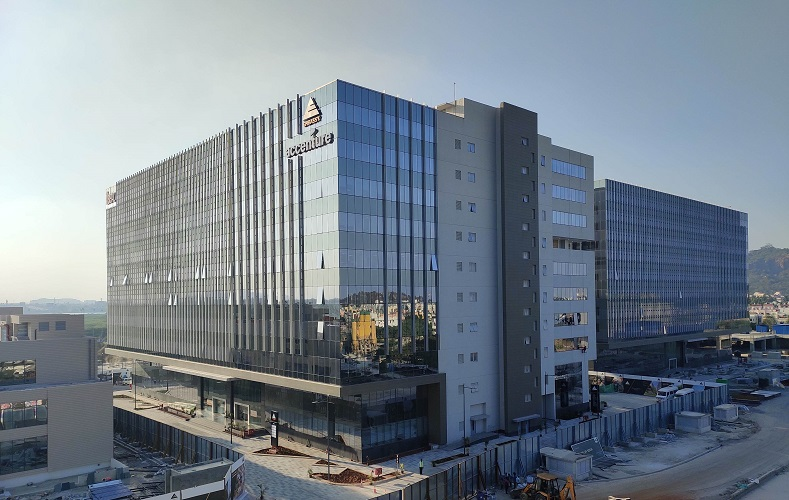
Embassy Splendid TechZone, Chennai
