= Kyrgyzstan–Uzbekistan border =

International border

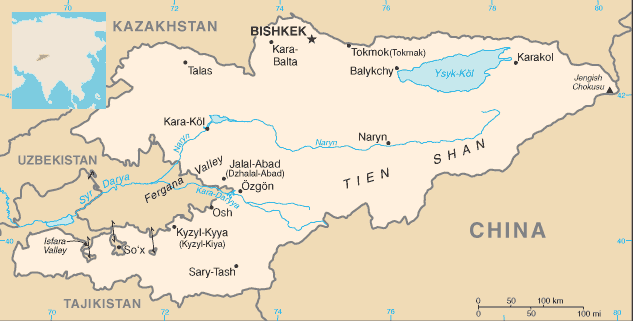
Map of Kyrgyzstan showing the border with Uzbekistan

Kyrgyzstani and Uzbek boundary markers

The Kyrgyzstan–Uzbekistan border is 1,314 kilometres (816 mi) in length and runs from the tripoint with Kazakhstan to the tripoint with Tajikistan. It is Kyrgyzstan's longest external boundary.

== Description ==
The border starts in the north at the tripoint with Kazakhstan and then creates a ‘finger’ of Uzbek territory wedged between Kazakhstan and Kyrgyzstan; the border traverses the Pskem Mountains, with much of this area being taken up by a series of national parks (Ugam-Chatkal National Park in Uzbekistan and Besh-Aral State Nature Reserve in Kyrgyzstan). The boundary then proceeds in a roughly south-eastwards direction, traversing the Chatkal Range and the Qurama Mountains before entering the Ferghana Valley near the town of Varzik. The rest of the boundary is very convoluted, consisting of a series of twisted lines forming the 'arrow-head' shape of eastern Uzbekistan. The north side of this ‘arrow’ contains a point of Uzbek territory in the middle, creating a small Uzbek pene-enclave at its tip just to the west of the Kyrgyz town of Kerben. The arrow's ‘tip’ lies just to the east of Khanabad. The border then proceeds via a series of jagged lines westwards to the Tajik tripoint.

The northernmost section of the border is mountainous and sparsely populated, in stark contrast to the rest which traverses the densely populated Ferghana Valley.

The Uzbek railway network has several sections which cross this border, leaving a handful of stations in Kyrgyzstan at the end of small branch lines, and the easternmost section of railway crosses the border twice. This is a legacy of the Soviet era where infrastructure was built without regard to what were then internal boundaries.

== Enclaves ==
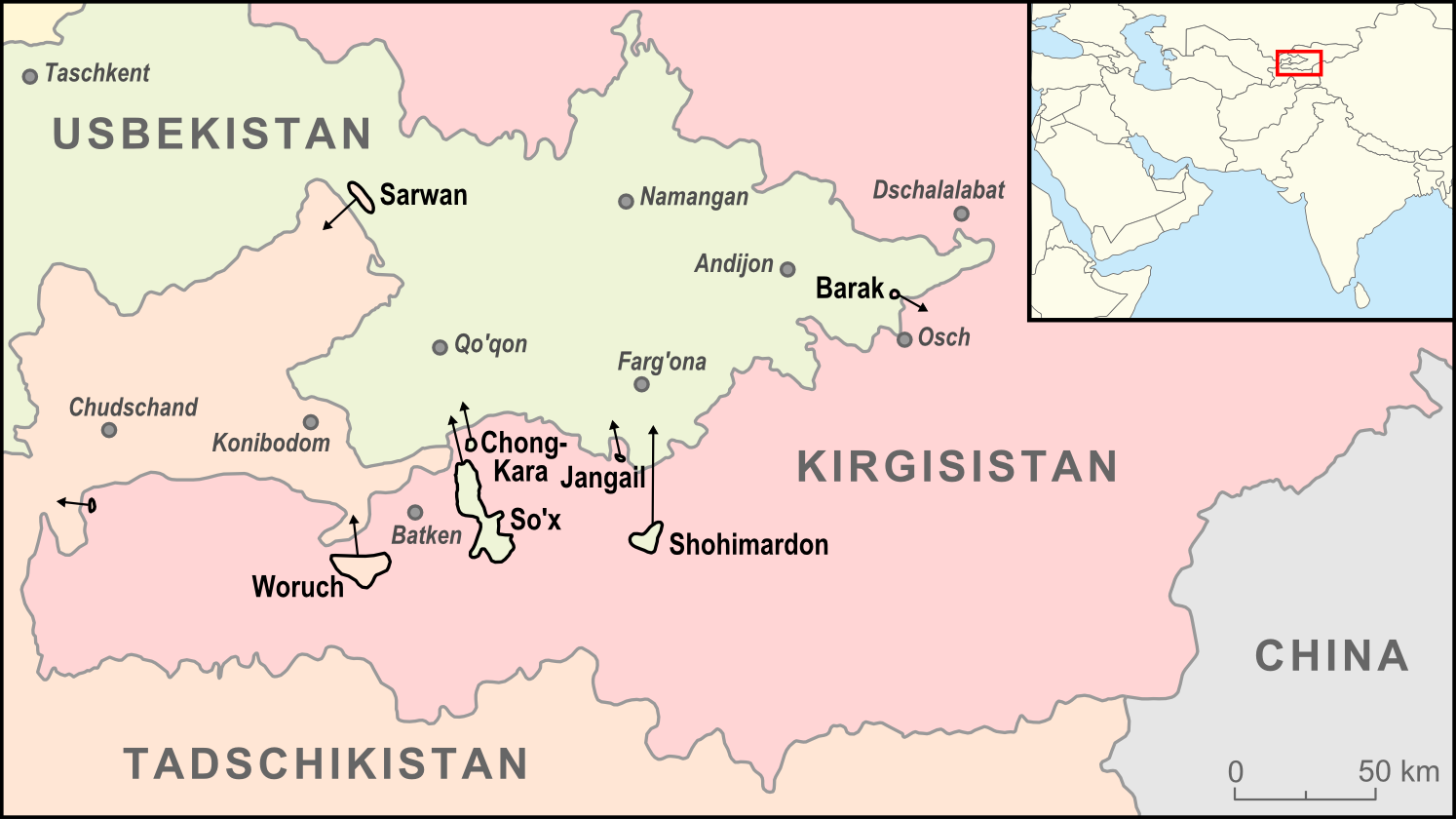
Map showing the Kyrgyz-Uzbek enclaves

Along the border, three Uzbek enclaves are within Kyrgyzstan (Sokh, Shohimardon, and Chon-Kara/Qalacha). Until 2024, the Kyrgyz enclave of Barak existed in Uzbekistan. Until 2026, the Uzbek enclave of Jangail existed in Kyrgyzstan.

== History ==
Russia had conquered Central Asia in the 19th century by annexing the formerly independent Khanates of Kokand and Khiva and the Emirate of Bukhara. After the Communists took power in 1917 and created the Soviet Union it was decided to divide Central Asia into ethnically-based republics in a process known as National Territorial Delimitation (or NTD). This was in line with Communist theory that nationalism was a necessary step on the path towards an eventually communist society, and Joseph Stalin's definition of a nation as being "a historically constituted, stable community of people, formed on the basis of a common language, territory, economic life, and psychological make-up manifested in a common culture".

The NTD is commonly portrayed by anti-communists as being nothing more than a cynical exercise in divide and rule, a deliberately Machiavellian attempt by Stalin to maintain Soviet hegemony over the region by artificially dividing its inhabitants into separate nations and with borders deliberately drawn so as to leave minorities within each state. Though indeed the Soviets were concerned at the possible threat of pan-Turkic nationalism, as expressed for example with the Basmachi movement of the 1920s, closer analysis informed by the primary sources paints a much more nuanced picture than is commonly presented.

The Soviets aimed to create ethnically homogeneous republics, however many areas were ethnically-mixed (e.g. the Ferghana Valley) and it often proved difficult to assign a ‘correct’ ethnic label to some peoples (e.g. the mixed Tajik-Uzbek Sart, or the various Turkmen/Uzbek tribes along the Amu Darya). Local national elites strongly argued (and in many cases overstated) their case and the Soviets were often forced to adjudicate between them, further hindered by a lack of expert knowledge and the paucity of accurate or up-to-date ethnographic data on the region. Furthermore, NTD also aimed to create ‘viable’ entities, with economic, geographical, agricultural and infrastructural matters also to be taken into account and frequently trumping those of ethnicity. The attempt to balance these contradictory aims within an overall nationalist framework proved exceedingly difficult and often impossible, resulting in the drawing of often tortuously convoluted borders, multiple enclaves and the unavoidable creation of large minorities who ended up living in the ‘wrong’ republic. Additionally the Soviets never intended for these borders to become international frontiers as they are today.

Soviet Central Asia in 1922 before national delimitation

NTD of the area along ethnic lines had been proposed as early as 1920. At this time Central Asia consisted of two Autonomous Soviet Socialist Republics (ASSRs) within the Russian SFSR: the Turkestan ASSR, created in April 1918 and covering large parts of what are now southern Kazakhstan, Uzbekistan and Tajikistan, as well as Turkmenistan, and the Kirghiz Autonomous Soviet Socialist Republic (Kirghiz ASSR, Kirgizistan ASSR on the map), which was created on 26 August 1920 in the territory roughly coinciding with the northern part of today's Kazakhstan (at this time Kazakhs were referred to as ‘Kyrgyz’ and what are now the Kyrgyz were deemed a sub-group of the Kazakhs and referred to as ‘Kara-Kyrgyz’ i.e. mountain-dwelling ‘black-Kyrgyz’). There were also the two separate successor ‘republics’ of the Emirate of Bukhara and the Khanate of Khiva, which were transformed into the Bukhara and Khorezm People's Soviet Republics following the takeover by the Red Army in 1920.

On 25 February 1924 the Politburo and Central Committee of the Soviet Union announced that it would proceed with NTD in Central Asia. The process was to be overseen by a Special Committee of the Central Asian Bureau, with three sub-committees for each of what were deemed to be the main nationalities of the region (Kazakhs, Turkmen and Uzbeks), with work then exceedingly rapidly. There were initial plans to possibly keep the Khorezm and Bukhara PSRs, however it was eventually decided to partition them in April 1924, over the often vocal opposition of their Communist Parties (the Khorezm Communists in particular were reluctant to destroy their PSR and had to be strong-armed into voting for their own dissolution in July of that year).

The border between Kyrgyzstan and Uzbekistan proved exceedingly hard to draw owing to the mixed nature of settlement in the Ferghana Valley. As a rule of thumb the territorial committees gave nomadic areas to the Kyrgyz and settled ones to the Uzbeks. However the Soviets felt that the Kyrgyz entity lacked towns, and that this would act as an impediment to economic development. It was for this reason that the Kyrgyz were awarded Osh, an overwhelmingly Uzbek-populated town. There were further disputes over Andijan, Margilan and Jala-abad; eventually the first two were given to the Uzbeks, the latter to the Kyrgyz. Originally the border was much longer, as the Uzbek SSR included the Khojand region as well as the rest of what is now Tajikistan as the Tajik ASSR. The border assumed its current position in 1929, with Tajikistan gaining Khojand and becoming a full SSR. The Kara-Kirghiz Autonomous Oblast was originally within the Russia SSR in October 1924, with borders matching those of modern Kyrgyzstan. In 1925 it was renamed the Kirghiz Autonomous Oblast in May 1925, then became the Kirghiz ASSR in 1926 (not to be confused with the Kirghiz ASSR that was the first name of Kazak ASSR), and finally it became the Kirghiz SSR in 1936.

The boundary became an international frontier in 1991 following the dissolution of the Soviet Union and the independence of its constituent republics. Tensions have already become apparent with the Krgyz-Uzbek riots in the city of Osh in 1990. In 1999/2000 Uzbekistan began unilaterally demarcating and mining sections of the border, citing the threat of cross-border terrorism. A 2001 agreement to potentially demarcate sections of the border and create land-swaps connecting their respective enclaves to the ‘mainland’ was poorly received in Kyrgyzstan and the agreement was never ratified, leading to continued tension along the border at this time. In more recent years relations have improved and a border agreement was signed in 2018 delimiting much of the boundary; discussions over the status of the enclaves is currently ongoing. In November 2022, Kyrgyzstan and Uzbekistan signed ratifications of a final treaty delimiting their border. In May 2023, they approved border demarcations.

== Border crossings ==
Listed from Northwest to Southeast:

Kyrgyz name	Uzbek name	Type of crossing	opening times
Baymak, Ala-Buka	Kosonsoy	bilateral road	daytime
Shamaldy-Say	Uchqoʻrgʻon	railway	
Madaniyat	Izboskan	international road	24/7
Bek-Abad	Khanabad	international road	24/7
Kara-Suu	Qorasuv	railway	
Dostuk	Dostlik	international road	24/7
Kara-Bagysh, Kochubaev	Mingtepa, Marhamat	bilateral road and rail	daytime
Kyzyl-Kiya	Quvasoy	bilateral road and railway	24/7
Kadamjay/Pülgön	Vodil	bilateral road	daytime

The border with the Sokh District is guarded by a series of checkpoints:

- Sharkin
- Qizl Kiyoq
- Sogment/Hushyar
- Qayrok/Tayan
- Chechme
- Dostlik/Tul
- Apkan-Otukchu/Limbur

The border with Shohimardon is guarded by a checkpoint at Ak-Kyya

The border with the Jangail exclave is unguarded.

== Settlements near the border ==
=== Kyrgyzstan ===
- Këk-Tash
- Sumsar
- Ala-Buka
- Akkorgon
- Ak-Tam
- Tuyukdzhar
- Kerben
- Uspenkovka
- Kyzyl-Jar
- Shamaldy-Say
- Kochkor-Ata
- Jalal-Abad
- Kara-Suu
- Osh
- Aravan
- Uch-Korgon
- Kyzyl-Kiya
- Kadamjay
- Pulgon
- Zar-Tash

=== Uzbekistan ===
- Gava
- Varzik
- Kosonsoy
- Iskavat
- Zarkent
- Paramat
- Bekovat
- Yangikurgan
- Uchqoʻrgʻon
- Paytug
- Andijan
- Paxtaobod
- Dardak
- Khanabad
- Qorasuv
- Qo‘rg‘ontepa
- Asaka, Uzbekistan
- Palvantash
- Marhamat
- Quva
- Fergana
- Quvasoy
- Margilan
- Rishton

== 2022 Agreement ==
On November 17, 2022, Kyrgyzstan gained 156 km^{2} from Uzbekistan.

== Disputed bodies of water ==
- Kempir-Abad Reservoir
- Kasan-Sai Reservoir

== See also ==
- Uzbekistan
- Kazakhstan–Uzbekistan border
- Turkmenistan–Uzbekistan border
- 2010 South Kyrgyzstan ethnic clashes
