= Börü =

Börü may refer to several places:

- Börü, Azerbaijan (Erməni Borisi), a village in Goranboy District
- Börü, Kyrgyzstan, a village in Osh Region

== See also ==
- Boru (disambiguation)
