= Telman =

Telman may refer to the following places:

- Telman, former name for Çayoba, a municipality in southern Azerbaijan
- in Kyrgyzstan:
- Telman, Panfilov, a village in Panfilov District, Chuy Region
- Telman, Ysyk-Ata, a village in Ysyk-Ata District, Chuy Region
- Telman, Jalal-Abad, a village in the city of Jalal-Abad, Jalal-Abad Region
- Telman, Osh, a village in Kara-Suu District, Osh Region
- Telman (given name)
