= Akbar Abdullaev =

Kyrgyz mixed martial artist (born 1997)

- Born: September 20, 1997 (age 29); Mady, Osh Region, Kyrgyzstan
- Other names: Bakal
- Height: 5 ft 9 in (1.75 m)
- Weight: 155 lb (70 kg; 11 st 1 lb)
- Division: Featherweight; Lightweight
- Reach: 70 in (178 cm)
- Fighting out of: Osh, Kyrgyzstan
- Team: Al-Munar Fight Club; Tiger Muay Thai
- Years active: 2020–present

Mixed martial arts record
- Total: 14
- Wins: 14
- By knockout: 13
- By submission: 1
- Losses: 0

Other information
- Mixed martial arts record from Sherdog

Akbar Abdullaev (Kyrgyz: Акбар Абдуллаев; born September 20, 1997) is a Kyrgyz mixed martial artist. He currently competes in the Lightweight division of the Ultimate Fighting Championship (UFC). He previously competed in the ONE Championship.

== Background ==
Abdullaev was born in the village of Mady in Kara-Suu District, part of the Osh Region, Kyrgyzstan. In early childhood, he moved with his family to Chaykovsky, Perm Krai, Russia. It was there that his passion for martial arts began, he actively trained in Muay Thai and kickboxing. After high school, Abdullaev enrolled in college but decided to interrupt his studies to serve in the army. After his service, he moved to Moscow. In 2022, he returned to Kyrgyzstan to focus on his MMA career.

== Mixed martial arts career ==
=== Early career ===
Abdullaev turned professional career in 2020 at regional promotions and amassed an undefeated record at 8–0, with 7 by knockout and 1 by submission before he joined with ONE Championship in 2023.

=== ONE Championship ===
Abdullaev made his ONE debut against Oh Ho-taek on March 25, 2023, at ONE Fight Night 8. He won the fight via technical knockout in round one and he earned him $50,000 Performance of the Night bonus.

Abdullaev faced Aaron Cañarte on July 15, 2023, at ONE Fight Night 12. He won the fight by technical knockout via spinning back kick and punches in round one. This win earned him $50,000 Performance of the Night bonus.

Abdullaev faced Halil Amir on May 4, 2024, at ONE Fight Night 22. He won the fight via knockout in round two and earned him $50,000 Performance of the Night bonus.

Abdullaev challenged Tang Kai for the ONE Featherweight World Championship on January 11, 2025, at ONE Fight Night 27. At the weigh-ins, Abdullaev failed two hydration tests and came in at 156.75 pounds. The bout proceeded as a non-title contest and he was fined 20% of his purse which went to Tang. He won the fight via technical knockout in round five.

Abdullaev faced Ibragim Dauev on September 6, 2025, at ONE Fight Night 35. He won the fight via technical knockout in round three.

=== Dana White's Contender Series ===
Abdullaev was invited to the season 10 of Dana White's Contender Series, against Anthony Figueroa on September 15, 2026. However, Figueroa withdrew for undisclosed reasons and was replaced by Ednilson Santos. He won the fight by knockout via 19 seconds in round one and was awarded a UFC contract.

=== Ultimate Fighting Championship ===
Abdullaev was initially announced to face Jake Matthews on November 21, 2026, at UFC Fight Night 294. However, Abdullaev will not compete at the event due to the promotion making a mistake with the matchup. As a result, Matthews will meet Tahir Abdullayev instead.

In his promotional debut, Abdullaev is scheduled to face Mairon Santos on December 5, 2026, at UFC Fight Night 295.

== Championships and accomplishments ==
- ONE Championship
  - Performance of the Night (Three times) vs. Oh Ho-taek, Aaron Cañarte and Halil Amir

== Mixed martial arts record ==
Professional record breakdown
| 14 matches | 14 wins | 0 losses |
| By knockout | 13 | 0 |
| By submission | 1 | 0 |

| Res. | Record | Opponent | Method | Event | Date | Round | Time | Location | Notes |
|---|---|---|---|---|---|---|---|---|---|
| Win | 14–0 | Ednilson Santos | KO (punch) | Dana White's Contender Series 92 | September 15, 2026 | 1 | 0:19 | Las Vegas, Nevada, United States | |
| Win | 13–0 | Ibragim Dauev | TKO (punches) | ONE Fight Night 35 | September 6, 2025 | 3 | 3:49 | Bangkok, Thailand | Catchweight (158.75 lb) bout; Abdullaev missed weight. |
| Win | 12–0 | Tang Kai | TKO (punches) | ONE Fight Night 27 | January 11, 2025 | 5 | 1:21 | Bangkok, Thailand | Originally for the ONE Featherweight Championship (155 lb); changed to a non-title bout when Abdullaev missed weight (156.75 lb). |
| Win | 11–0 | Halil Amir | KO (punches) | ONE Fight Night 22 | May 4, 2024 | 2 | 2:52 | Bangkok, Thailand | Performance of the Night. |
| Win | 10–0 | Aaron Cañarte | TKO (spinning back kick and punches) | ONE Fight Night 12 | July 15, 2023 | 1 | 0:41 | Bangkok, Thailand | Performance of the Night. |
| Win | 9–0 | Oh Ho-taek | TKO (punches) | ONE Fight Night 8 | March 25, 2023 | 1 | 0:44 | Kallang, Singapore | Lightweight debut. Performance of the Night. |
| Win | 8–0 | Kyyalbek Keldibay uulu | Submission (rear-naked choke) | WEF Selection 42 | November 16, 2022 | 1 | 0:49 | Bishkek, Kyrgyzstan | |
| Win | 7–0 | Erbol Zholdoshbekov | TKO (punches) | WEF Selection 42 | November 16, 2022 | 1 | 2:13 | Bishkek, Kyrgyzstan | |
| Win | 6–0 | Omurbek Toktoali uulu | TKO (punches) | WEF Selection 42 | November 16, 2022 | 1 | 3:47 | Bishkek, Kyrgyzstan | |
| Win | 5–0 | Alexander Treskin | TKO (punches) | RCC Intro 23 | September 23, 2022 | 3 | 3:34 | Yekaterinburg, Russia | |
| Win | 4–0 | Konstantin Simonov | TKO (punches) | RCC Intro 21 | June 25, 2022 | 1 | 2:48 | Yekaterinburg, Russia | |
| Win | 3–0 | Tolkunbek Mamatov | KO (punches) | WEF Selection 33 | June 21, 2021 | 1 | 1:56 | Moscow, Russia | |
| Win | 2–0 | Asadulla Rustamov | TKO (punches) | FMR FC: Selection 5 | December 12, 2020 | 1 | 4:10 | Moscow, Russia | |
| Win | 1–0 | Kurbon Aminov | TKO (head kick and punches) | FMR FC: Selection 4 | October 24, 2020 | 1 | 4:42 | Moscow, Russia | Featherweight debut. |

== See also ==
- List of current UFC fighters
- List of male mixed martial artists
