= ONE 166 =

Combat sport events in 2024

ONE 166: Qatar
- The poster for ONE 166: Qatar
- Promotion: ONE Championship
- Date: March 1, 2024
- Venue: Lusail Sports Arena
- City: Lusail, Qatar

Event chronology
ONE Friday Fights 53: Phetsukumvit vs. Kongsuk	ONE 166: Qatar	ONE Friday Fights 54: Ortikov vs. Watcharapon

ONE 166: Qatar was a combat sport event produced by ONE Championship that took place on March 1, 2024, at Lusail Sports Arena in Lusail, Qatar.

== Background ==
This event marked the organization's debut in Qatar. It also the second visit to Middle East, since ONE FC: Reign of Champions in Dubai, United Arab Emirates in August 2014.

A ONE Middleweight World Championship bout between current champion Reinier de Ridder (also former ONE Light Heavyweight World Champion) and the ONE Light Heavyweight and Heavyweight Champion Anatoly Malykhin headlined the event. The pairing previously met at ONE on Prime Video 5 in a light heavyweight title, which Malykhin captured the title by first-round knockout. If successful, Malykhin would become the first fighter in MMA history to win championships in three divisions as well as to hold them simultaneously.

A ONE Featherweight World Championship unification rematch between current champion Tang Kai and former champion/current interim title holder Thanh Le took place at the co-main event. The pairing previously met at ONE 160 which Tang captured the title by unanimous decision. The pairing was previously scheduled to meet at ONE Fight Night 12, but Tang withdraw from the bout due to a knee injury.

A ONE Strawweight World Championship rematch between current champion Jarred Brooks and former two-time champion Joshua Pacio took place at the event. The pairing previously met at ONE 164, where Brooks captured the title by unanimous decision.

A ONE Women's Atomweight World Championship bout between current champion Stamp Fairtex (also ONE Women's Atomweight World Grand Prix winner, former ONE Women's Atomweight Muay Thai and Kickboxing World Champion) and Denice Zamboanga was expected to take place at the event. However, the bout was moved to June so the fighters can take part in the start of an original docuseries production.

A ONE Welterweight Submission Grappling World Championship bout between current champion Tye Ruotolo and Izaak Michell was expected to take place at the event. However, the bout was moved back to April for unknown reasons.

Former ONE Bantamweight Muay Thai World Champion Nong-O Hama was expected to face Vladimir Kuzmin in a bantamweight Muay Thai bout. However, Nong-O was removed from the bout for unknown reason and was replaced by promotional newcomer Zafer Sayik in a catchweight of 147.75 pounds.

== Results ==
Main card (Amazon Prime Video)
Weight class				Method	Round	Time	Notes
Middleweight	Anatoly Malykhin	def.	Reinier de Ridder (c)	TKO (retirement)	3	1:16	(Note: For the ONE Middleweight World Championship.)
Featherweight	Tang Kai (c)	def.	Thanh Le (ic)	TKO (punches)	3	4:48	(Note: For the ONE Featherweight World Championship.)
Strawweight	Joshua Pacio	def.	Jarred Brooks (c)	DQ (illegal slam)	1	0:56	(Note: For the ONE Strawweight World Championship.)
Heavyweight	Amir Aliakbari	def.	Arjan Bhullar	DQ (timidity)	3	4:50	(Note: The bout was ended by disqualification due to the referee giving Bhullar a red card for inactivity.)
Catchweight (147 lb)	Mehdi Zatout	def.	Zuhayr Al-Qahtani	Decision (unanimous)	3	3:00	(Note: Boxing bout.)
Catchweight (147.75 lb) Muay Thai	Vladimir Kuzmin	def.	Zafer Sayik	Decision (unanimous)	3	3:00
Flyweight Submission Grappling	Cleber Sousa	def.	Osamah Almarwai	Submission (reverse triangle armbar)	1	5:31
Flyweight Muay Thai	Ali Saldoev	def.	Zakaria El Jamari	KO (punches)	2	0:51	(Note: Saldoev failed hydration; bout negotiated at catchweight)
Bantamweight Muay Thai	Shinji Suzuki	def.	Han Zihao	Decision (unanimous)	3	3:00
Strawweight	Keito Yamakita	def.	Jeremy Miado	Submission (bulldog choke)	1	4:04

== Bonus awards ==
The following fighters received $50,000 bonuses.

- Performance of the Night: Anatoly Malykhin and Tang Kai

== See also ==
- 2024 in ONE Championship
- List of ONE Championship events
- List of current ONE fighters
- ONE Championship Rankings
