= Jolon Mamytov =

Famous Kyrgyz aqyn

Jolon Mamytov Жолон Мамытов
- Born: April 1, 1940; Tölöykön, Kara-Suu District, Osh oblast, Kirghiz SSR
- Died: March 7, 1988 (aged 47); Bishkek
- Occupation: Aqyn
- Known for: Love songs

Jolon Mamytov (Kyrgyz: Жолон Мамытов (April 1, 1940 – March 7, 1988) was a famous Kyrgyz aqyn, known especially for his love songs/poems. He was born in the village of Tölöykön in Kara-Suu District, Osh Region, Kirghiz SSR and died in Bishkek.

== Awards ==
Mamytov received the Soviet Medal "For Labour Valour" in 1973, and in 1981 received the Kyrgyzstan Lenin Komsomol Prize for his poetry collections "Суунун өмүрү" ("The life of water") and "Эр Чилтен", as well as the puppet show he wrote called "Түрк эненин балдары" ("A Turkish mother's children"), and the cartoon screenplay "Olokon".

Posthumously, Mamytov was awarded the A. Maldybayev award for the libretto opera "Sepil", as well as the national Toktogul award for his poetry book "Жүз жашка тол, кылым" ("Turn one hundred years old, century").

== Publications ==
Mamytov wrote in both Kyrgyz and Russian, and also participated in translation of some works between the two. The following are among his more notable works.

=== Songs, poetry, and Fiction ===
- Мамытов, Жолон (1969). Отту сүйөм: Ырлар. – Ф.: Кыргызстан. – 79 б.
- Мамытов, Жолон (1971). Жашыл аалам: Ырлар. – Ф.: Мектеп. – 68 б.
- Мамытов, Жолон (1973). Убакыт: Ырлар. – Ф.: Кыргызстан. – 56 б.
- Мамытов, Жолон (1975). Ырлар: Ырлар жана драмалык поэма. – Ф.: Мектеп. – 87 б.
- Мамытов, Жолон (1976). Мезгилдин элеси: Ырлар жана поэма. – Ф.: Кыргызстан. – 79 б.
- Мамытов, Жолон (1980). Буурул тандын жомогу: Баатырдык поэма. -Ф.: Мектеп. – 44 б.
- Мамытов, Жолон (1981). Суунун өмүрү: Ырлар, поэмалар. – Ф.: Кыргызстан. – 172 б.
- Мамытов, Жолон (1981). Сказка о храбром Чилтене: Сказка – поэма. – Ф.: Мектеп. – 44 с.
- Мамытов, Жолон (1983). Родник и Океан: Стихотворения и поэмы. – Ф.: Мектеп – 135 с.
- Мамытов, Жолон (1985). Жарышкан суулар: Ырлар, романстар, сонеттер, поэма-мистерия, публицистикалар. – Ф.: Кыргызстан. – 144 б.
- Мамытов, Жолон (1985). Ток: Стихи. – М.: Сов.писатель, . – 86 с.
- Мамытов, Жолон (1986). Атка токум салгыла: Ырлар. – Ф.: Мектеп. – 20 б.
- Мамытов, Жолон (1987). Жүз жашка толгон кылым: Публицистикалык поэма, ырлар, сонеттер, драмалуу легенда баян. – Ф.: Кыргызстан, . – 96 б.

=== Posthumous compendiums ===
- Мамытов, Жолон (1991). Сказки: Сказка о храбром Чилтене; Охотник Багыш; Джанар и Олокон: для мл. школ. возраста /Пер. с кырг. М.И.Синельникова и др. – Ф.: Адабият. – 63 с.
- Мамытов, Жолон (1991). Башат жана мухит: Тандалмалар / Түз.: Меңди Мамазаирова. – Б.: Адабият, 1991. – 447 б.: ил.

=== Translations ===
- Слуцкий М. Коса Неринги: – Ф.: Мектеп, 1979. – 92 б.
- Коңур күз: Орус акындарынын ырлары /Котор.: Ж.Мамытов, Ж.Садыков, Э.Турсунов. – Ф.: Мектеп,1983. – 17 б.
- Марти Хосе. Эркиндик аралы: Ырлар. /Котор.: Ж.Мамбетов, А.Абдыкалыков, Т.Бостонкулов. – Ф.: Кыргызстан,1988. – 76 б.
- Маяковский В. Үнүмдүн жетишинче /Котор.: Ж.Мамытов, С.Жусуев, Н.Жаркынбаев ж.б.. – Ф.: Кыргызстан, 1984. – 120 б.
- Фет А. Коңгуроолор: Ырлар /Котор.: Ж.Мамытов, Э.Ибраев, Н.Жаркынбаев ж.б. – Ф.: Мектеп, 1984. – 23 б.
- Нусупов Т.Н., Зайков Ф.А. Жаңы устав жана колхоздук өндүрүш. – Ф.: Кыргызстан 1971. – 139 б.
- Сулейманов Олжас. Аргымак /Котор.: Ж.Мамытов, Н.Жаркынбаев, С.Жусуев ж.б. – Ф.: Кыргызстан. – 111 б.

=== Publications about Mamytov and his work ===
- Оморов А. (2002). Жолон Мамытовдун ырларынын поэтикасынын айрым маселелери. – Б.: Жалал-Абад. – 124 б.
- Абакиров М. "Жазганым эл ичинде калат эми, мен жокто алар кайра жанат эми": (Акын курбум Жолон Мамытовду эскерип) // Кыргыз Туусу. – 2006. – 7-9-март. – №17. – Б. 12
- Жусуев С. Көгүш түндө көктөн учкан жылдыздай... же дагы бир жолу Ж.Мамытовду эскерип // Zaman Кыргызстан. – 2006. – 11-авг. – №26. – Б. 13.

== Publications available on the internet ==
A number of Mamytov's poems are now published on the internet.
