= Tuu =

Tuu or TUU may refer to:

As a name

- Tuu (band) (1980s–1999), British ambient band
- Tuu languages, spoken in Botswana and South Africa
- Xuan Tuu (1925–1996), Vietnamese writer properly addressed as Tuu
- Tuu, fictional homeworld of Lugians in the game Asheron's Call 2

As an abbreviation

- Tasmania University Union, in Australia

As a code

- Tabuk Regional Airport, in Saudi Arabia, IATA code TUU
- Tututni language by ISO 639-3 code

== See also ==
- Kings of Easter Island, many including "Tuu" in their name
- Kyzyl-Tuu, several places in Kyrgyzstan
