= Boru =

Boru may refer to:

== Places ==
- Börü, Azerbaijan (Erməni Borisi), a village in Goranboy District
- Börü, Kyrgyzstan, a village in Osh Region

== People ==
- Boru Chandidas (born 1408), medieval Bengali poet
- Brian Boru (941–1014), King of Ireland
- Sean Boru (born 1953), Irish actor and author
- Sorcha Boru (1900–2006), potter and sculptor

== Other ==
- Boru, a military trumpet in Turkey
