= Kojo-Keleng =

Kojo-Keleng Кожо-Келең
- Location within Kyrgyzstan
- Coordinates: 39°58′00″N 72°57′50″E
- Country: Kyrgyzstan
- Region: Osh
- District: Kara-Suu
- Elevation: 2,200 m (7,200 ft)

Population (2021)
  - Total: 2,224
- Time zone: UTC+6

Kojo-Keleng (Kyrgyz: Кожо-Келең, also Кызыл-Тала Kyzyl-Tala) is a mountain village in Osh Region of Kyrgyzstan. It is part of the Kara-Suu District. It lies in the valley of the river Jiptiksuu, a tributary of the Ak-Buura. Its population was in 2,224 in 2021.
