= Chalkuyruk =

- Location in Kyrgyzstan

Location
- Country: Kyrgyzstan
- Region: Osh

Physical characteristics
- Mouth: Ak-Buura
  - coordinates: 39.9795°N 73.0043°E

The Chalkuyruk (Kyrgyz: Чалкуйрук) is a river in Osh Region of Kyrgyzstan. It is a right tributary of the Ak-Buura.
