= Kyzyltu =

Kyzyltu may refer to:

- Kyzyltu, Kazakhstan, a village in the Almaty Region, Kazakhstan
- Kyzyltu, former name of Kishkenekol, North Kazakhstan Region Province, Kazakhstan
- Kyzyl-Tuu, several villages in Kyrgyzstan
- Kyzyltu, Russia, a rural locality (a settlement) in Altai Krai, Russia
