= Kyzyl-Tuu, Kara-Suu =

Kyzyl-Tuu Кызыл-Туу
- Location within Kyrgyzstan
- Coordinates: 40°15′50″N 72°59′0″E
- Country: Kyrgyzstan
- Region: Osh
- District: Kara-Suu
- Elevation: 1,500 m (4,900 ft)

Population (2021)
  - Total: 2,132
- Time zone: UTC+6 (KGT)

Kyzyl-Tuu (Kyrgyz: Кызыл-Туу) is a village in the Osh Region of Kyrgyzstan. It is part of the Kara-Suu District. It lies in the valley of the river Ak-Buura, 5 km south of Papan. Its population was in 2,132 in 2021.
