= Jyldyz Joldosheva =

Kyrgyzstani politician

Member of the Supreme Council of Kyrgyzstan

Jyldyz Joldosheva (Kyrgyz: Жылдызкан Айтибаевна Жолдошева; March 2, 1960, in Kyrgyz-Chek, Kara-Suu District, Osh Region, Kyrgyzstan) is a Kyrgyz politician who is a member of the Ata-Jurt Party. She is a member of the Supreme Council of Kyrgyzstan.
