= Marhamat District =

Coordinates: 40.5000°N 72.3333°E

Marhamat
- District
- Marhamat tumani
- Interactive map of Marhamat
- Country: Uzbekistan
- Region: Andijan Region
- Capital: Marhamat
- Established: 1926

Area
  - Total: 321 km^{2} (124 sq mi)

Population (2025)
  - Total: 197,798
  - Density: 616/km^{2} (1,600/sq mi)
- Time zone: UTC+5 (UZT)

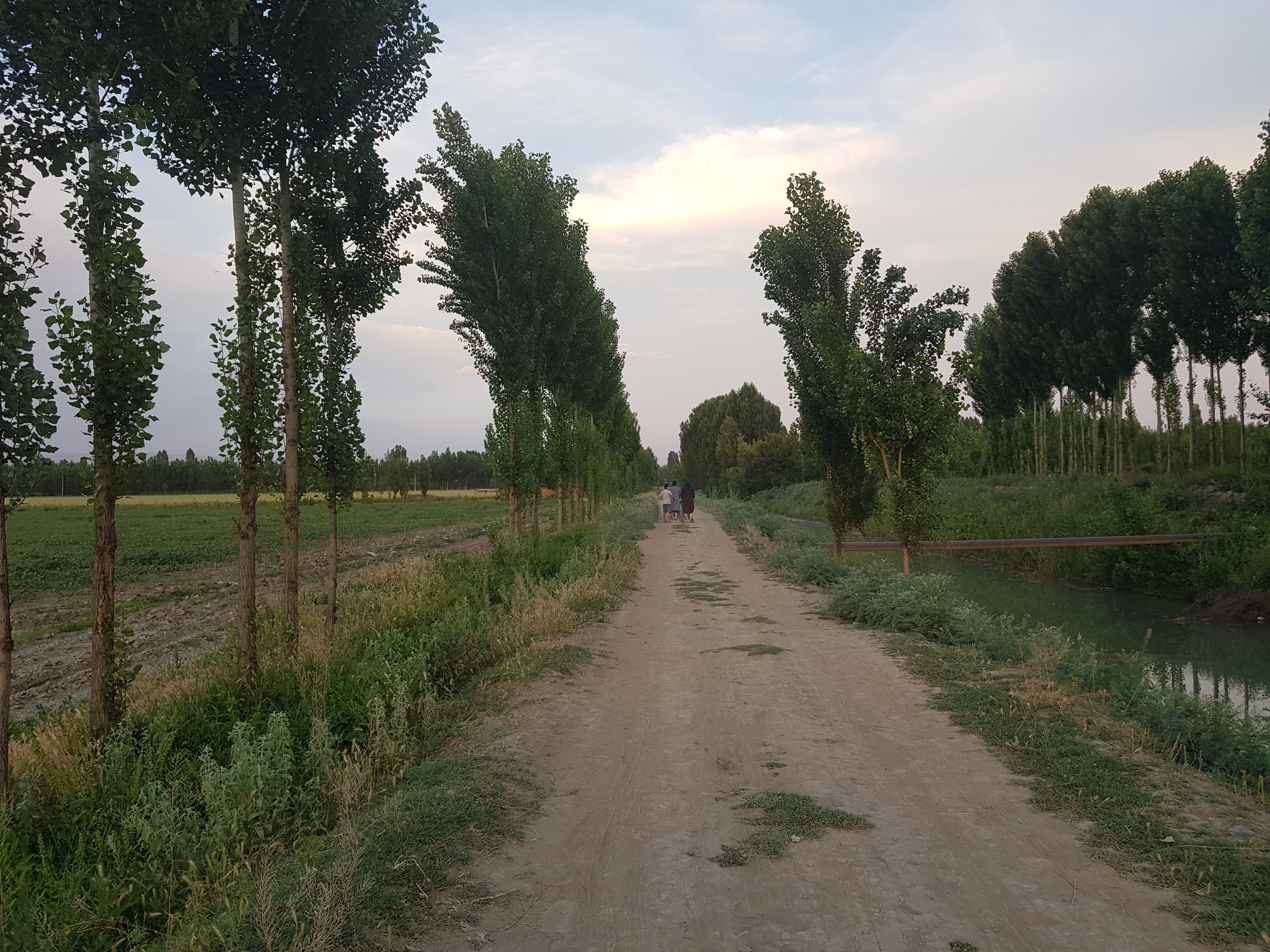
In the fields of Marhamat

Marhamat (also: Marxamat) is a district of Andijan Region in Uzbekistan. The capital lies at the city Marhamat. It has an area of 321 km^{2} (124 sq mi) and it had 197,798 inhabitants in 2025.

The district consists of 1 city (Marhamat), 10 urban-type settlements (Polvontosh, Boboxuroson, Qorabogʻish, Qoraqoʻrgʻon, Koʻtarma, Marxamat, Rovot, Oʻqchi, Xakka and Xoʻjaariq) and 5 rural communities.
