= Bek-Jar =

Bek-Jar Kyrgyz: Бек-Жар
- Location within Kyrgyzstan
- Coordinates: 40°21′30″N 73°8′30″E
- Country: Kyrgyzstan
- Region: Osh Region
- District: Kara-Suu District
- Elevation: 1,900 m (6,200 ft)

Population (2021)
  - Total: 1,259
- Time zone: UTC+6

Bek-Jar (Kyrgyz: Бек-Жар) is a village in Osh Region of Kyrgyzstan. It is part of the Kara-Suu District. Its population was 1,259 in 2021.

The village of Laglan is 3.9 miles (6.2 km) to the south.
