= Tu2 =

Tu2, TU2 or Tu-2 may refer to:

== Transportation ==
- Tupolev Tu-2 Bat, Soviet WWII bomber airplane
- TU2 diesel locomotive, Soviet narrow-gauge diesel locomotive train engine
- Type TU2, a variant of the Hamburg U-Bahn Type A electric multiple unit train
- PSA TU2, a variant of the automotive PSA TU engine

== Other uses ==
- TU2, Ba'ja, Petra, Jordan

== See also ==
- TU (disambiguation)
- tutu (disambiguation)
- Tuu (disambiguation)
