= Keng-Say =

Keng-Say Kyrgyz: Кең-Сай
- Location within Kyrgyzstan
- Coordinates: 40°42′20″N 72°54′20″E
- Country: Kyrgyzstan
- Region: Osh
- District: Kara-Suu

Population (2021)
  - Total: 6,604
- Time zone: UTC+6

Keng-Say (Kyrgyz: Кең-Сай) is a village in Osh Region of Kyrgyzstan. It is part of the Kara-Suu District. Its population was 6,604 in 2021.

== Population ==
Historical population
Year	Pop.	±% p.a.
2009	5,068	—
2021	6,604	+2.23%
Note: resident population; Sources:
