= Teeke =

Teeke Тээке
- Location within Kyrgyzstan
- Coordinates: 40°15′50″N 73°10′10″E
- Country: Kyrgyzstan
- Region: Osh Region
- District: Kara-Suu District

Population (2021)
  - Total: 903
- Time zone: UTC+6

Teeke is a village in Kara-Suu District, Osh Region of Kyrgyzstan. Its population was 903 in 2021.
