= Polvontosh =

- urban-type settlement
- Location in Uzbekistan
- Coordinates: 40°33′20″N 72°14′15″E
- Country: Uzbekistan
- Region: Andijan Region
- District: Marhamat District
- Urban-type settlement status: 1947

Population (2016)
  - Total: 7,800
- Time zone: UTC+5 (UZT)

Polvontosh (Uzbek: Полвонтош, Polvontosh, Russian: Палванташ, romanized: Palvantash) is an urban-type settlement in Andijan Region, Uzbekistan. It is part of Marhamat District. The town population was 5,445 people in 1989, and 7,800 in 2016.
