= Kaba, Kyrgyzstan =

Kaba Каба
- Location within Kyrgyzstan
- Coordinates: 41°15′00″N 72°50′30″E
- Country: Kyrgyzstan
- Region: Jalal-Abad
- District: Bazar-Korgon

Population (2021)
  - Total: 2,484
- Time zone: UTC+6

Kaba (Kyrgyz: Каба) is a village in Jalal-Abad Region of Kyrgyzstan. Its population was 2,484 in 2021. It is part of the Bazar-Korgon District. Although located in Kyrgyzstan, the settlement is also known as Uzbek-Gava. It has been a sticking point in negotiations with Uzbekistan. Since 2001, Kyrgyzstan and Uzbekistan have intermittently convened a joint border delimitation commission. From 2002 and after, progress toward completion has been largely stalled by the most controversial points. The main disputed areas have been the enclaves of Barak and Sokh and the areas of Gava and Gavasay (stream).
