= Pravda, Kyrgyzstan =

Pravda Правда
- Location within Kyrgyzstan
- Coordinates: 40°41′40″N 73°07′10″E
- Country: Kyrgyzstan
- Region: Osh
- District: Kara-Suu
- Elevation: 950 m (3,120 ft)

Population (2021)
  - Total: 6,136
- Time zone: UTC+6

Pravda (Kyrgyz: Правда) is a village in the Osh Region of Kyrgyzstan. It is part of the Kara-Suu District. It lies on the left bank of the river Kurshab. Its population was in 6,136 in 2021.

== Population ==
Historical population
Year	Pop.	±% p.a.
2009	4,868	—
2021	6,136	+1.95%
Note: resident population; Sources:
