= Abdygany Radzhapov Central Stadium =

Football stadium in Kara-Suu, Kyrgyzstan

- Interactive map of Abdygany Radzhapov Central Stadium
- Location: Kara-Suu, Kyrgyzstan
- Coordinates: 40.707°N 72.872°E
- Owner: Jashtyk-Ak-Altyn
- Capacity: 5,000

Tenant
- Jashtyk-Ak-Altyn

Abdygany Radzhapov Central Stadium is a football stadium in Kara-Suu, Kyrgyzstan. It is the home stadium of Jashtyk-Ak-Altyn of the Kyrgyzstan League. The stadium holds 5,000 spectators.
