= Kyzyl-Shark =

Kyzyl-Shark Кызыл-Шарк
- Location within Kyrgyzstan
- Coordinates: 40°43′30″N 72°55′50″E
- Country: Kyrgyzstan
- Region: Osh
- District: Kara-Suu

Population (2021)
  - Total: 6,102
- Time zone: UTC+6

Kyzyl-Shark (Kyrgyz: Кызыл-Шарк) is a village in Osh Region of Kyrgyzstan. It is part of the Kara-Suu District. Its population was 6,102 in 2021.

== Population ==
Historical population
Year	Pop.	±% p.a.
2009	4,875	—
2021	6,102	+1.89%
Note: resident population; Sources:
