= Kyzyl-Tuu =

Kyzyl-Tuu may refer to the following places in Kyrgyzstan:

- Kyzyl-Tuu, Moskva, a village in Moskva District, Chuy Region
- Kyzyl-Tuu, Sokuluk, a village in Sokuluk District, Chuy Region
- Kyzyl-Tuu, Issyk Kul, a village in Tong District, Issyk-Kul Region
- Kyzyl-Tuu, Aksy, a village in Aksy District, Jalal-Abad Region
- Kyzyl-Tuu, Nooken, a village in Nooken District, Jalal-Abad Region
- Kyzyl-Tuu, Suzak, a village in Suzak District, Jalal-Abad Region
- Kyzyl-Tuu, Toktogul, a village in Toktogul District, Jalal-Abad Region
- Kyzyl-Tuu, Naryn, a village in At-Bashy District, Naryn Region
- Kyzyl-Tuu, Chong-Alay, a village in Chong-Alay District, Osh Region
- Kyzyl-Tuu, Kara-Suu, a village in Kara-Suu District, Osh Region
- Kyzyl-Tuu, Talas, a village in Talas District, Talas Region
