= Tashtak =

Tashtak Таштак
- Location within Kyrgyzstan
- Coordinates: 40°32′10″N 72°49′20″E
- Country: Kyrgyzstan
- Region: Osh
- District: Kara-Suu

Population (2021)
  - Total: 11,869
- Time zone: UTC+6

Tashtak (Kyrgyz: Таштак) is a village in Osh Region of Kyrgyzstan. It is part of the Kara-Suu District. Its population was 11,869 in 2021.

== Population ==
Historical population
Year	Pop.	±% p.a.
2009	13,560	—
2021	11,869	−1.10%
Note: resident population; Sources:
