= Bel-Kyshtak =

Bel-Kyshtak Kyrgyz: Бел-Кыштак
- Location within Kyrgyzstan
- Coordinates: 40°33′36″N 72°40′48″E
- Country: Kyrgyzstan
- Region: Osh Region
- District: Kara-Suu District
- Elevation: 901 m (2,956 ft)

Population (2021)
  - Total: 2,144
- Time zone: UTC+6

Bel-Kyshtak (Kyrgyz: Бел-Кыштак) is a village in Osh Region of Kyrgyzstan. It is part of the Kara-Suu District. Its population was 2,144 in 2021.

It is less than 1 km from the border with Uzbekistan, and 11 km northwest of Osh.
