= Tang Kai =

Chinese mixed martial arts fighter (born 1996)

Tang Kai 唐凯
- Born: January 10, 1996 (age 30); Shaoyang, Hunan, China
- Height: 5 ft 10 in (1.78 m)
- Weight: 155 lb (70 kg; 11.1 st)
- Division: Featherweight (2016–2019); Lightweight (2019–present) (Note: ONE Championship refers to their 155 lb class as Featherweight, but under the Association of Boxing Commissions in the United States, 155 lbs is considered Lightweight.)
- Reach: 72.4 in (184 cm)
- Style: Wrestling, Boxing
- Fighting out of: Phuket, Thailand
- Team: Sunkin International Fight Club; Dragon Warrior Gym; Tiger Muay Thai
- Years active: 2016–present

Mixed martial arts record
- Total: 23
- Wins: 20
- By knockout: 16
- By decision: 4
- Losses: 3
- By knockout: 1
- By decision: 2

Other information
- Mixed martial arts record from Sherdog

Tang Kai (Chinese: 唐凯, January 10, 1996) is a Chinese professional mixed martial artist who currently competes in the Featherweight division for ONE Championship. He is the current ONE Featherweight World Champion.

== Early life ==
Tang was born in Shaoyang, Hunan province. He signed up for wrestling training at a provincial sports school in 2008 at the age of 12 where he dreamt of becoming an Olympian after the 2008 Summer Olympics were held in Beijing. At the same time, he was still working part-time, and was admitted to Wuhan Institute of Physical Education with excellent results. After seeing the difficult odds of making it into the national team, Tang became interested in entering MMA as a career.

== Mixed martial arts career ==
=== Early career ===
Tang started his professional MMA career in 2016 and fought primarily in China. Amassed a record of 10–2 prior to his joined with ONE Championship.

=== ONE Championship ===
Tang his promotional debut against Sung Jong Lee at ONE: Hero's Ascent on January 25, 2019. He won the fight via head kick knockout in the second round.

Tang faced Edward Kelly at ONE: Age Of Dragons on November 16, 2019. He won the fight via unanimous decision.

Tang faced Keanu Subba at ONE: Reign of Dynasties 2 on October 9, 2020, and aired on October 16, 2020. He won the fight via unanimous decision.

Tang faced Ryogo Takahashi at ONE: Fists Of Fury 2 on February 26, 2021, and aired on March 5, 2021. He won the fight via TKO in the first round.

Tang faced Yoon Chang Min at ONE: NextGen 2 on October 29, 2021, and aired on November 12, 2021. He won the fight via TKO in the first round.

Tang was scheduled to face Kim Jae Woong on January 28, 2022, at ONE: Only the Brave. However, Kim forced to withdraw before the event due to undisclosed medical issue. The pair was rescheduled to meet at ONE: X on March 26, 2022. He won the fight via knockout in the first round. This win earned him the Performance of the Night award.

==== ONE Featherweight World Champion ====
Tang faced Thanh Le for the ONE Featherweight World Championship at ONE 160 on August 26, 2022. He won the bout via unanimous decision and capture the ONE Featherweight Championship.

The rematch between Tang and Le for the ONE Featherweight World Championship was scheduled on July 15, 2023, at ONE Fight Night 12. However, Tang withdraw from the bout due to knee injury. After Le won the interim champion at ONE Fight Night 15, the fight was rescheduled in a unification bout on March 1, 2024, at ONE 166. He retained the title via technical knockout in round three. This win earned the $50,000 Performance of the Night awards.

In the second title defense, Tang faced Akbar Abdullaev on January 11, 2025, at ONE Fight Night 27. At the weigh-ins, Abdullaev failed two hydration tests and came in at 156.75 pounds. The bout proceeded as a non-title contest and he was fined 20% of his purse which went to Tang. He lost the fight via technical knockout in the round five.

Kai officially faced Shamil Gasanov for his second title defense at ONE Fight Night 43, on May 16, 2026. He won the fight via technical knockout, due to a leg kick and punches. After the fight, he was given a $50,000 Performance of the Night award bonus, making it his third inside the promotion.

== Championships and accomplishments ==
- ONE Championship
  - ONE Featherweight World Championship (One time; current)
    - Two successful title defenses
  - Performance of the Night (Two time) vs. Kim Jae-woong, Thanh Le, and Shamil Gasanov
  - 2024: Ranked #3 Knockout of the Year vs. Thanh Le
- WBK
  - WBK Featherweight Tournament Winner

== Mixed martial arts record ==
Professional record breakdown
23 matches	20 wins	3 losses
By knockout	16	1
By decision	4	2

Res.	Record	Opponent	Method	Event	Date	Round	Time	Location	Notes
Win	20–3	Shamil Gasanov	TKO (leg kick)	ONE Fight Night 43	May 16, 2026	4	2:41	Bangkok, Thailand	Defended the ONE Featherweight Championship (155 lb). Performance of the Night.
Loss	19–3	Akbar Abdullaev	TKO (punches)	ONE Fight Night 27	January 11, 2025	5	1:21	Bangkok, Thailand	Non-title bout; Abdullaev missed weight (156.75 lb).
Win	19–2	Thanh Le	TKO (punches)	ONE 166	March 1, 2024	3	4:48	Lusail, Qatar	Defended and unified the ONE Featherweight Championship (155 lb). Performance of the Night.
Win	18–2	Thanh Le	Decision (unanimous)	ONE 160	August 26, 2022	5	5:00	Kallang, Singapore	Won the ONE Featherweight Championship (155 lb).
Win	17–2	Kim Jae-woong	KO (punches)	ONE: X	March 26, 2022	1	2:07	Kallang, Singapore	Performance of the Night.
Win	16–2	Yoon Chang-min	TKO (punches)	ONE: NextGen 2	November 12, 2021	1	4:03	Kallang, Singapore	
Win	15–2	Ryogo Takahashi	TKO (punches)	ONE: Fists of Fury 2	March 5, 2021	1	1:59	Kallang, Singapore	
Win	14–2	Keanu Subba	Decision (unanimous)	ONE: Reign of Dynasties 2	October 16, 2020	3	5:00	Kallang, Singapore	
Win	13–2	Edward Kelly	Decision (unanimous)	ONE: Age of Dragons	November 16, 2019	3	5:00	Beijing, China	
Win	12–2	Lee Sung-jong	KO (head kick)	ONE: Hero's Ascent	January 25, 2019	2	1:14	Pasay, Philippines	Return to Lightweight.
Win	11–2	Nikolay Kondratuk	TKO (punches)	Rebel FC 8	May 30, 2018	1	1:41	Guangzhou, China	
Win	10–2	Mario Sismundo	TKO (punches)	Rebel FC 7	April 29, 2018	2	1:05	Shanghai, China	Return to Featherweight.
Win	9–2	Batjargal	TKO (punches)	YunFeng Showdown 8	December 23, 2017	2	3:20	Yantai, China	Lightweight debut.
Win	8–2	Mark Gregory Valerio	KO (head kick)	Rebel FC 6	September 2, 2017	2	3:48	Shenzhen, China	
Loss	7–2	Asikeerbai Jinensibieke	Decision (unanimous)	Kunlun Fight MMA 10	April 10, 2017	3	5:00	Beijing, China	
Loss	7–1	Bekhruz Zukhurov	Decision (unanimous)	WBK 21	December 10, 2016	3	5:00	Ningbo, China	
Win	7–0	Asror Olimshoev	TKO (retirement)	WBK 19	September 10, 2016	2	5:00	Ningbo, China	Won the WBK Featherweight Tournament.
Win	6–0	Avliyohon Hamidov	TKO (punches)	WBK 19	September 10, 2016	2	4:39	Ningbo, China	WBK Featherweight Tournament Semifinal.
Win	5–0	Hadi Purnomo	TKO (punches)	WBK 16	June 26, 2016	2	0:29	Ningbo, China	
Win	4–0	Artur Kascheev	TKO (punches)	WBK 15	June 9, 2016	1	N/A	Ningbo, China	
Win	3–0	Jose Francisco Vinuelas	KO (punch)	WBK 14	April 29, 2016	1	3:31	Taizhou, China	
Win	2–0	Ahmet Yazjanov	TKO (elbows)	WBK 13	April 9, 2016	1	3:01	Ningbo, China	
Win	1–0	Yang Shuo	Decision (unanimous)	WBK 12	March 26, 2016	1	N/A	Qingdao, China	Featherweight debut.

== See also ==
- List of current ONE fighters

== Notes ==
Achievements
Preceded by Thanh Le	7th ONE Featherweight World Champion; August 26, 2022–present	Incumbent
