= Kyrgyz-Chek =

- Location within Kyrgyzstan
- Coordinates: 40°33′0″N 72°52′12″E
- Country: Kyrgyzstan
- Region: Osh Region
- District: Kara-Suu District
- Elevation: 978 m (3,209 ft)

Population (2021)
  - Total: 6,196
- Time zone: UTC+6

Kyrgyz-Chek is a village in Osh Region of Kyrgyzstan. It is part of the Kara-Suu District. Its population was 6,196 in 2021.

== Population ==
Historical population
Year	Pop.	±% p.a.
2009	4,590	—
2021	6,196	+2.53%
Note: resident population; Sources:

== Notable people ==
- Jyldyz Joldosheva (born 1960), Kyrgyz politician
