= Alpordo =

Alpordo Kyrgyz: Алпордо
- Location within Kyrgyzstan
- Coordinates: 40°26′40″N 73°14′40″E
- Country: Kyrgyzstan
- Region: Osh Region
- District: Kara-Suu District

Population (2021)
  - Total: 1,210
- Time zone: UTC+6

Alpordo (Kyrgyz: Алпордо, romanized: Alpordo) is a village in Osh Region of Kyrgyzstan. It is part of the Kara-Suu District. Its population was 1,210 in 2021.
