= Ak-Tash, Osh =

Ak-Tash Kyrgyz: Ак-Таш
- Location within Kyrgyzstan
- Coordinates: 40°40′10″N 72°48′50″E
- Country: Kyrgyzstan
- Region: Osh Region
- District: Kara-Suu District

Population (2021)
  - Total: 5,148
- Time zone: UTC+6

Ak-Tash (Kyrgyz: Ак-Таш, lit. 'White Stone') is a village in Osh Region of Kyrgyzstan. It is part of the Kara-Suu District. Its population was 5,148 in 2021. It is on the border with Uzbekistan, 7 km southwest of Kara-Suu.

== Population ==
Historical population
| Year | Pop. | ±% p.a. |
|---|---|---|
| 2009 | 3,759 | — |
| 2021 | 5,148 | +2.66% |
Note: resident population; Sources:
