= Kurankol =

Kurankol Kyrgyz: Куранкол
- Location within Kyrgyzstan
- Coordinates: 40°23′50″N 73°09′10″E
- Country: Kyrgyzstan
- Region: Osh Region
- District: Kara-Suu District

Population (2021)
  - Total: 321
- Time zone: UTC+6

Kurankol (Kyrgyz: Куранкол) is a village in Osh Region of Kyrgyzstan. It is part of the Kara-Suu District. Its population was 321 in 2021.
