= Shark, Kyrgyzstan =

Shark Шарк
- Location within Kyrgyzstan
- Coordinates: 40°33′25″N 72°49′35″E
- Country: Kyrgyzstan
- Region: Osh
- District: Kara-Suu

Population (2021)
  - Total: 21,120
- Time zone: UTC+6

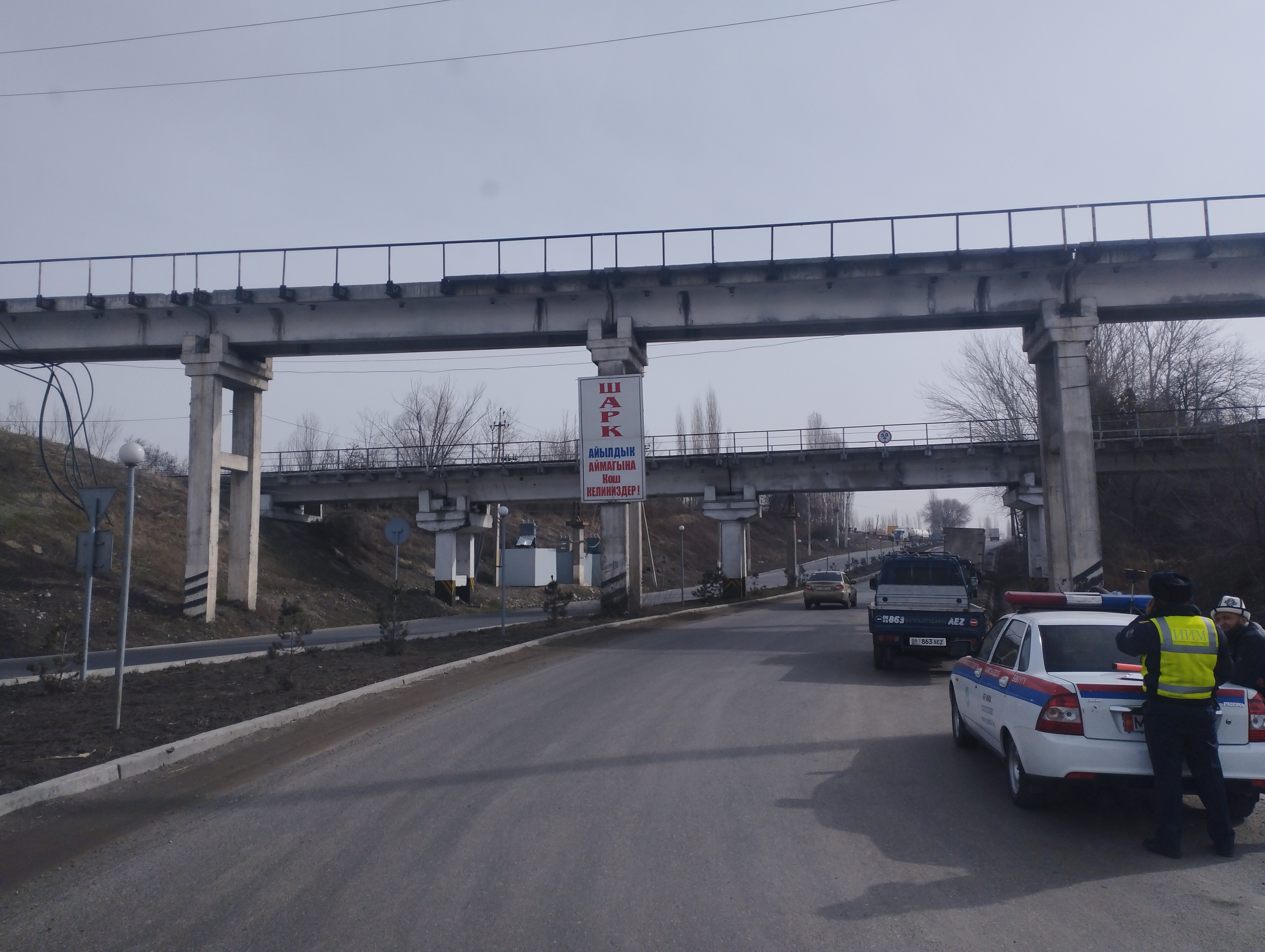
Sharq rural area

Shark (Kyrgyz: Шарк) is a village in Osh Region of Kyrgyzstan. It is part of the Kara-Suu District. Its population was 21,120 in 2021.

== Population ==
Historical population
Year	Pop.	±% p.a.
2009	16,928	—
2021	21,120	+1.86%
Note: resident population; Sources:
