= Kalinin, Osh =

Kalinin Kyrgyz: Калинин Russian: Калинин
- Location in Kyrgyzstan
- Coordinates: 40°38′20″N 72°52′0″E
- Country: Kyrgyzstan
- Region: Osh
- District: Kara-Suu

Population (2021)
  - Total: 2,571

Kalinin (Kyrgyz and Russian: Калинин, romanized: Kalinin) is a village in Osh Region, southern Kyrgyzstan. It is part of the Kara-Suu District. Its population was 2,571 in 2021.
