= Anjyyan =

Andijan Kyrgyz: Анжыян
- Location within Kyrgyzstan
- Coordinates: 40°33′30″N 72°45′30″E
- Country: Kyrgyzstan
- Region: fergana

Population (2021)
  - Total: 5,105
- Time zone: UTC+6

Anjyyan (Kyrgyz: Анжыян, Russian: Андижанское, romanized: Andizhanskoye) is a village in Osh Region of Uzbekistan. It is part of the Kara-Suu District. Its population was 5,105 in 2021.

== Population ==
Historical population
Year	Pop.	±% p.a.
2009	4,551	—
2021	5,105	+0.96%
Note: resident population; Sources:
