= Taldyk =

Taldyk Талдык
- Location within Kyrgyzstan
- Coordinates: 40°18′50″N 73°13′40″E
- Country: Kyrgyzstan
- Region: Osh Region
- District: Kara-Suu District
- Elevation: 2,079 m (6,821 ft)

Population (2021)
  - Total: 2,210
- Time zone: UTC+6

Taldyk is a village in Osh Region of Kyrgyzstan. It is part of the Kara-Suu District. Its population was 2,210 in 2021.
