= Uchar =

- Location within Kyrgyzstan
- Coordinates: 40°28′48″N 72°47′24″E
- Country: Kyrgyzstan
- Region: Osh Region
- District: Kara-Suu District
- Elevation: 1,074 m (3,524 ft)

Population (2021)
  - Total: 4,651
- Time zone: UTC+6

Uchar is a village in Osh Region of Kyrgyzstan. It is part of the Kara-Suu District. Its population was 4,651 in 2021.
