= Otuz-Adyr =

Otuz-Adyr Отуз-Адыр
- Location within Kyrgyzstan
- Coordinates: 40°36′0″N 72°57′36″E
- Country: Kyrgyzstan
- Region: Osh
- District: Kara-Suu
- Elevation: 1,011 m (3,317 ft)

Population (2021)
  - Total: 6,597
- Time zone: UTC+6

Otuz-Adyr (Kyrgyz: Отуз-Адыр) is a village in Kara-Suu District of Osh Region of Kyrgyzstan. It is the administrative center of the Otuz-Adyr rural community (ayyl aymagy). Its population was 6,597 in 2021.

== Population ==
Historical population
Year	Pop.	±% p.a.
2009	5,875	—
2021	6,597	+0.97%
Note: resident population; Sources:
