= Kyzyl-Bayrak, Kara-Suu =

Kyzyl-Bayrak Кызыл-Байрак
- Location within Kyrgyzstan
- Coordinates: 40°32′29″N 72°42′52″E
- Country: Kyrgyzstan
- Region: Osh Region
- District: Kara-Suu District

Population (2021)
  - Total: 1,706
- Time zone: UTC+6

Kyzyl-Bayrak is a village in Kara-Suu District, Osh Region of Kyrgyzstan. Its population was 1,706 in 2021.
