= Savay =

Savay (Saray)
- Location within Kyrgyzstan
- Coordinates: 40°45′0″N 72°58′48″E
- Country: Kyrgyzstan
- Region: Osh Region
- District: Kara-Suu District
- Elevation: 780 m (2,560 ft)

Population (2021)
  - Total: 3,964
- Time zone: UTC+6

Savay (Saray) is a village in Osh Region of Kyrgyzstan. It is part of the Kara-Suu District. Its population was 3,964 in 2021. It is on the border with Uzbekistan, across from the Uzbek town Sultonobod.
