= Kichik =

Kichik Kyrgyz: Кичик
- Location within Kyrgyzstan
- Coordinates: 40°17′40″N 73°11′30″E
- Country: Kyrgyzstan
- Region: Osh Region
- District: Kara-Suu District
- Elevation: 2,060 m (6,760 ft)

Population (2021)
  - Total: 321
- Time zone: UTC+6

Kichik (Kyrgyz: Кичик) is a village in Osh Region of Kyrgyzstan. It is part of the Kara-Suu District. Its population was 321 in 2021.
