= Talaa =

Talaa Талаа
- Location within Kyrgyzstan
- Coordinates: 40°26′40″N 73°15′30″E
- Country: Kyrgyzstan
- Region: Osh Region
- District: Kara-Suu District

Population (2021)
  - Total: 2,185
- Time zone: UTC+6

Talaa is a village in Osh Region of Kyrgyzstan. It is part of the Kara-Suu District. Its population was 2,185 in 2021.
