= Kyzyl-Ordo =

Kyzyl-Ordo Кызыл-Ордо
- Location within Kyrgyzstan
- Coordinates: 40°32′30″N 73°3′0″E
- Country: Kyrgyzstan
- Region: Osh Region
- District: Kara-Suu District
- Elevation: 1,311 m (4,301 ft)

Population (2021)
  - Total: 1,315
- Time zone: UTC+6

Kyzyl-Ordo (Kyrgyz: Кызыл-Ордо) is a village in the Osh Region of Kyrgyzstan. It is part of the Kara-Suu District. Its population was 1,315 in 2021.
