= ONE Fight Night 27 =

Combat sport events in 2025

ONE Fight Night 27: Tang vs. Abdullaev
- The poster for ONE Fight Night 27: Tang vs. Abdullaev
- Promotion: ONE Championship
- Date: January 11, 2025
- Venue: Lumpinee Boxing Stadium
- City: Bangkok, Thailand

Event chronology
| ONE Friday Fights 93: Kongchai vs. Ondash | ONE Fight Night 27: Tang vs. Abdullaev | ONE Friday Fights 94: Puengluang vs. Guluzada |

ONE Fight Night 27: Tang vs. Abdullaev was a combat sports event produced by ONE Championship that took place on January 11, 2025, at Lumpinee Boxing Stadium in Bangkok, Thailand.

== Background ==
A ONE Featherweight World Championship bout between current champion Tang Kai and Akbar Abdullaev headlined the event. At the weigh-ins, Abdullaev failed two hydration tests and changed to five-round non-title bout in a 156.75 pounds instead.

An interim ONE Women's Atomweight World Championship bout between Denice Zamboanga and Alyona Rassohyna served as the co-main event. The pair was previously to meet at ONE Fight Night 25, but Zamboanga withdrawn from the bout due to a hamstring injury.

Aaron Cañarte and Timofey Nastyukhin were scheduled to meet in a lightweight MMA bout at this event. However, Nastyukhin pulled out for unknown reasons and was replaced by Enkh-Orgil Baatarkhuu.

At the weigh-ins, Kulabdam Sor.Jor.Piek-U-Thai, John Lineker, Praham Gheirati, Cody Jerome and Aaron Cañarte failed the multiple hydration tests. The all bout proceeded at catchweight: Kulabdam vs. Lineker moved to 150.75 pounds, Jerome vs. Luke Lessei moved to 160.5 pounds, and Cañarte vs. Baatarkhuu moved to 160.75 pounds. In turn, the bout between Gheirati and Rambolek Chor.Ajalaboon was removed from the event.

== Results ==
Fight card (Amazon Prime Video)
| Weight class | | | | Method | Round | Time | Notes |
|---|---|---|---|---|---|---|---|
| Featherweight | Akbar Abdullaev | def. | Tang Kai (c) | TKO (punches) | 5 | 1:21 | (Note: Five-round non-title bout; Abdullaev missed weight (156.75 lb).) |
| Bantamweight Muay Thai | Kulabdam Sor.Jor.Piek-U-Thai | def. | John Lineker | Decision (unanimous) | 3 | 3:00 | (Note: Both fighters missed weight: Kulabdam (149.25 lb) and Lineker (150.75 lb).) |
| Women's Atomweight | Denice Zamboanga | def. | Alyona Rassohyna | TKO (elbows and punches) | 2 | 4:47 | (Note: For the interim ONE Women's Atomweight World Championship.) |
| Featherweight Muay Thai | Luke Lessei | def. | Cody Jerome | TKO (body kicks and punches) | 1 | 2:00 | (Note: Jerome missed weight (160.5 lb).) |
| Catchweight (180 lbs) Submission Grappling | Dante Leon | def. | Tommy Langaker | Decision (unanimous) | 1 | 10:00 |
| Strawweight | Sanzhar Zakirov | def. | Tatsumitsu Wada | Decision (unanimous) | 3 | 5:00 |
| Featherweight | Enkh-Orgil Baatarkhuu | def. | Aaron Cañarte | Submission (kimura) | 1 | 3:43 | (Note: Cañarte missed weight (160.75 lb).) |
| Women's Atomweight | Meng Bo | def. | Chihiro Sawada | Decision (unanimous) | 3 | 5:00 |
| Bantamweight Muay Thai | Dmitrii Kovtun | def. | Suablack Tor.Pran49 | Decision (unanimous) | 3 | 3:00 |

== Bonus awards ==
The following fighters received $50,000 bonuses:

- Performance of the Night: Denice Zamboanga and Luke Lessei

== See also ==
- 2025 in ONE Championship
- List of ONE Championship events
- List of current ONE fighters
- ONE Championship Rankings
