= Jiydalik =

Jiydalik Kyrgyz: Жийдалик
- Location within Kyrgyzstan
- Coordinates: 40°33′50″N 72°47′30″E
- Country: Kyrgyzstan
- Region: Osh
- District: Kara-Suu

Population (2021)
  - Total: 5,422
- Time zone: UTC+6

Jiydalik (Kyrgyz: Жийдалик) is a village in Osh Region of Kyrgyzstan. It is part of the Kara-Suu District. Its population was 5,422 in 2021.

== Population ==
Historical population
Year	Pop.	±% p.a.
2009	5,041	—
2021	5,422	+0.61%
Note: resident population; Sources:
