= Nariman, Kyrgyzstan =

Nariman
- Location within Kyrgyzstan
- Coordinates: 40°35′50″N 72°47′50″E
- Country: Kyrgyzstan
- Region: Osh Region
- District: Kara-Suu District
- Elevation: 947 m (3,107 ft)

Population (2021)
  - Total: 12,021
- Time zone: UTC+6

Nariman is a village in Kara-Suu District of Osh Region of Kyrgyzstan. Its population was 12,021 in 2021.

== Population ==
Historical population
Year	Pop.	±% p.a.
2009	9,901	—
2021	12,021	+1.63%
Note: resident population; Sources:
