= Marhamat =

- City
- Location in Uzbekistan
- Coordinates: 40°30′00″N 72°20′00″E
- Country: Uzbekistan
- Region: Andijan Region
- District: Marhamat District
- Town status: 1974

Population (2016)
  - Total: 13,600
- Time zone: UTC+5 (UZT)

Marhamat (Uzbek: Marhamat/Марҳамат, Russian: Мархамат) is a town in Andijan Region, Uzbekistan. It is the administrative center of Marhamat District. Its population was 11,055 in 1989, and 13,600 in 2016.
