= Kyzyl-Abad =

Kyzyl-Abad Кызыл-Абад
- Location within Kyrgyzstan
- Coordinates: 40°34′30″N 72°59′50″E
- Country: Kyrgyzstan
- Region: Osh Region
- District: Kara-Suu District
- Elevation: 1,107 m (3,632 ft)

Population (2021)
  - Total: 1,673
- Time zone: UTC+6

Kyzyl-Abad is a village in the Osh Region of Kyrgyzstan. It is part of the Kara-Suu District. Its population was 1,673 in 2021.
