= Monok, Kyrgyzstan =

Monok Мөнөк
- Location within Kyrgyzstan
- Coordinates: 40°37′40″N 72°47′10″E
- Country: Kyrgyzstan
- Region: Osh
- District: Kara-Suu

Population (2021)
  - Total: 5,020
- Time zone: UTC+6

Monok (Kyrgyz: Мөнөк) is a village in Osh Region of Kyrgyzstan. It is part of the Kara-Suu District. Its population was 5,020 in 2021.

== Population ==
Historical population
Year	Pop.	±% p.a.
2009	3,656	—
2021	5,020	+2.68%
Note: resident population; Sources:
