= Mamajan =

Mamajan Мамажан
- Location within Kyrgyzstan
- Coordinates: 40°36′40″N 72°55′10″E
- Country: Kyrgyzstan
- Region: Osh Region
- District: Kara-Suu District
- Elevation: 950 m (3,120 ft)

Population (2021)
  - Total: 3,445
- Time zone: UTC+6

Mamajan is a village in Osh Region of Kyrgyzstan. It is part of the Kara-Suu District. Its population was 3,445 in 2021.
