= Dyykan-Kyshtak =

Dyykan-Kyshtak Kyrgyz: Дыйкан-Кыштак
- Location within Kyrgyzstan
- Coordinates: 40°30′36″N 72°46′48″E
- Country: Kyrgyzstan
- Region: Osh Region
- District: Kara-Suu District
- Elevation: 1,028 m (3,373 ft)

Population (2021)
  - Total: 13,406
- Time zone: UTC+6

Dyykan-Kyshtak (Kyrgyz: Дыйкан-Кыштак) is a village in Osh Region of Kyrgyzstan. It is part of the Kara-Suu District. Its population was 13,406 in 2021. It is a western suburb of the city of Osh.

== Population ==
Historical population
Year	Pop.	±% p.a.
2009	9,679	—
2021	13,406	+2.75%
Note: resident population; Sources:
