= Bash-Bulak =

Bash-Bulak Kyrgyz: Баш-Булак
- Location within Kyrgyzstan
- Coordinates: 40°30′36″N 72°57′36″E
- Country: Kyrgyzstan
- Region: Osh Region
- District: Kara-Suu District
- Elevation: 1,257 m (4,124 ft)

Population (2021)
  - Total: 6,020
- Time zone: UTC+6

Bash-Bulak (Kyrgyz: Баш-Булак) is a village in Kara-Suu District of Osh Region of Kyrgyzstan. It is the center of Katta-Taldyk rural community. Its population was 6,020 in 2021.

== Population ==
Historical population
Year	Pop.	±% p.a.
2009	4,431	—
2021	6,020	+2.59%
Note: resident population; Sources:
