= Thanh Le =

American mixed martial arts fighter

Thanh J. Le
- Born: Thanh James Le; August 28, 1985 (age 41); Owensboro, Kentucky, United States
- Nationality: American
- Height: 5 ft 9 in (175 cm)
- Weight: 155 lb (70 kg; 11 st 1 lb)
- Division: Featherweight (2017–2018); Lightweight (2013–2016, 2019–present)
- Reach: 74.5 in (189 cm)
- Fighting out of: Metairie, Louisiana, United States
- Team: Fifty/50 Striking Program; MidCity MMA
- Rank: 5th Dan Black Belt in Taekwondo; Black Belt in Brazilian Jiu-jitsu
- Years active: 2013–present

Mixed martial arts record
- Total: 18
- Wins: 14
- By knockout: 12
- By submission: 2
- Losses: 4
- By knockout: 2
- By submission: 1
- By decision: 1

Other information
- Mixed martial arts record from Sherdog

Thanh James Le (born August 28, 1985) is an American mixed martial artist. A professional since 2012, Le has competed in the Featherweight division for the ONE Championship, he is the former interim and lineal ONE Featherweight World Champion and Legacy Fighting Alliance. He also appeared on reality television series The Ultimate Fighter: Team McGregor vs. Team Faber.

== Background ==
Le was born on August 28, 1985, in Owensboro, Kentucky, United States. His father migrated from Vietnam and met his mother in Kentucky, before the family moved to New Orleans, Louisiana, when he was five years old.

== Mixed martial arts career ==
=== Early career ===
Le made his professional MMA debut in November 2013. Over the next, he fought in his native United States and earned a record of four wins against one loss with all of his wins coming via stoppages.

=== The Ultimate Fighter ===
On August 31, 2015, it was announced that Le would be a contestant on the 22nd season of The Ultimate Fighter reality show, representing Team Faber.

In the opening elimination bout, Le faced fellow American Andrés Quintana. He won the fight via knockout in the first round.

Le represented Team Faber in the first preliminary fight of the season facing Sweden's Martin Svensson. He lost the fight via rear-naked choke submission in the second round.

=== Legacy Fighting Alliance and Dana White's Contender Series ===
Le his promotional debut against Alex Black on February 10, 2017, at LFA 3. He won the fight via TKO in the first round.

Le appeared in Dana White's Contender Series 2 on July 18, 2017, against Lazar Stojadinovic. He won the fight via knockout in the second round, he wasn't given a UFC contract.

Le faced Bobby Moffett for the Interim LFA Featherweight Championship on January 19, 2018, at LFA 31. He won the fight via TKO in the second round to earn the title.

Le fought in a unification bout for the LFA Featherweight Championship against Kevin Aguilar on May 25, 2018, at LFA 40. He lost the fight via knockout in the first round.

=== ONE Championship ===
Le made his promotional debut against Yusup Saadulaev on May 3, 2019, at ONE: For Honor. He won the bout via knockout in the second round.

Le faced former ONE Lightweight World Champion Kotetsu Boku on August 16, 2019, at ONE: Dreams of Gold. He won the bout via knockout in the first round.

Le faced Ryogo Takahashi on January 10, 2020, at ONE: A New Tomorrow. He won the bout via knockout in the first round.

==== ONE Featherweight World Champion ====
Le faced Martin Nguyen for the ONE Featherweight World Championship on October 30, 2020, at ONE: Inside the Matrix. He won the fight via TKO in the third round.

Le was scheduled to defend his title against Garry Tonon on December 5, 2021, at ONE: X. However, on October 28, 2021, the event was postponed to early 2022 due to COVID-19 pandemic. The fight was rescheduled for ONE: Lights Out on March 11, 2022. He won the fight via knockout in the first round. This win earned him the Performance of the Night award.

Le faced Tang Kai on August 26, 2022, at ONE 160. He lost the fight and the title via unanimous decision.

The rematch between Le and Tang for the ONE Featherweight World Championship was scheduled on July 15, 2023, at ONE Fight Night 12. However, Tang withdraw from the bout due to knee injury and the bout was cancelled.

Le faced Ilya Freymanov for the interim ONE Featherweight World Championship on October 7, 2023, at ONE Fight Night 15. He won the bout via heel hook in the first round. This win earned him the Performance of the Night award.

Le faced Tang Kai in a rematch, for the ONE Featherweight World Championship unification bout on March 1, 2024, at ONE 166. He lost the bout via technical knockout in round three.

== Championships and accomplishments ==
=== Mixed martial arts ===
- ONE Championship
  - ONE Featherweight World Championship (One time)
    - One successful title defense
  - Interim ONE Featherweight World Championship (One time)
  - Performance of the Night (Two times) vs. Garry Tonon and Ilya Freymanov
  - 2020 ONE Championship Knockout of the Year vs. Martin Nguyen
  - 2020 ONE Championship Fight of the Year vs. Martin Nguyen
- Legacy Fighting Alliance
  - Interim LFA Featherweight Championship (One time)

== Mixed martial arts record ==
Professional record breakdown
18 matches	14 wins	4 losses
By knockout	12	2
By submission	2	1
By decision	0	1

Res.	Record	Opponent	Method	Event	Date	Round	Time	Location	Notes
Loss	14–4	Tang Kai	TKO (punches)	ONE 166	March 1, 2024	3	4:48	Lusail, Qatar	For the ONE Featherweight Championship (155 lb).
Win	14–3	Ilya Freymanov	Submission (heel hook)	ONE Fight Night 15	October 7, 2023	1	1:02	Bangkok, Thailand	Won the interim ONE Featherweight Championship (155 lb). Performance of the Night.
Loss	13–3	Tang Kai	Decision (unanimous)	ONE 160	August 26, 2022	5	5:00	Kallang, Singapore	Lost the ONE Featherweight Championship (155 lb).
Win	13–2	Garry Tonon	KO (punches)	ONE: Lights Out	March 11, 2022	1	0:56	Kallang, Singapore	Defended the ONE Featherweight Championship (155 lb). Performance of the Night.
Win	12–2	Martin Nguyen	TKO (punches)	ONE: Inside the Matrix	October 30, 2020	3	2:19	Kallang, Singapore	Won the ONE Featherweight Championship (155 lb).
Win	11–2	Ryogo Takahashi	KO (punches)	ONE: A New Tomorrow	January 10, 2020	1	2:51	Bangkok, Thailand	
Win	10–2	Kotetsu Boku	KO (punches)	ONE: Dreams of Gold	August 16, 2019	1	1:28	Bangkok, Thailand	
Win	9–2	Yusup Saadulaev	KO (knee)	ONE: For Honor	May 3, 2019	2	0:12	Jakarta, Indonesia	Return to Lightweight.
Loss	8–2	Kevin Aguilar	KO (punches)	LFA 40	May 25, 2018	1	2:44	Dallas, Texas, United States	For the LFA Featherweight Championship.
Win	8–1	Bobby Moffett	TKO (punches)	LFA 31	January 19, 2018	2	0:55	Phoenix, Arizona, United States	Won the interim LFA Featherweight Championship.
Win	7–1	Lazar Stojadinovic	KO (head kick and punches)	Dana White's Contender Series 2	July 18, 2017	2	1:35	Las Vegas, Nevada, United States	
Win	6–1	Alex Black	TKO (body kick and punches)	LFA 3	February 10, 2017	1	1:43	Lake Charles, Louisiana, United States	Featherweight debut.
Win	5–1	Cody James	TKO (punches)	Mid City Fight Productions 1	June 24, 2016	1	0:40	Avondale, Louisiana, United States	
Win	4–1	Josh Quayhagen	TKO (punches)	WFC 31	November 22, 2014	1	2:49	Baton Rouge, Louisiana, United States	
Win	3–1	Shawn Fitzsimmons	TKO (elbows)	WFC 27	September 12, 2014	1	0:27	Baton Rouge, Louisiana, United States	
Win	2–1	Matt Vaughn	Submission	Renaissance MMA 30	June 6, 2014	1	4:36	New Orleans, Louisiana, United States	
Win	1–1	Justin Martin	TKO (punches)	Xtreme FC: Le vs. Martin	April 5, 2014	1	2:44	Ponchatoula, Louisiana, United States	
Loss	0–1	Robert Dunn	Submission (rear-naked choke)	Renaissance MMA 29	November 8, 2013	1	4:58	New Orleans, Louisiana, United States	Lightweight debut.

Exhibition record breakdown		
2 matches	1 win	1 loss
By knockout	1	0
By submission	0	1

Res.	Record	Opponent	Method	Event	Date	Round	Time	Location	Notes
Loss	1–1	Martin Svensson	Submission (rear-naked choke)	The Ultimate Fighter: Team McGregor vs. Team Faber	August 7, 2015 (airdate)	2	3:48	Las Vegas, Nevada, United States	TUF 22 Elimination round.
Win	1–0	Andrés Quintana	KO (punch)	The Ultimate Fighter: Team McGregor vs. Team Faber	July 17, 2015 (airdate)	1	2:27	Las Vegas, Nevada, United States	TUF 22 Qualifying round.

== See also ==
- List of male mixed martial artists
- List of Dana White's Contender Series alumni
