= Barak, Uzbekistan =

Barak Барак
- Interactive map of Barak
- Location of Barak in Kyrgyzstan
- Coordinates: 40°40′N 72°46′E
- Country: Uzbekistan
- Region: Andijan Region
- District: Qoʻrgʻontepa District
- Elevation: 868 m (2,848 ft)

Population (2024)
  - Total: 0
- Time zone: UTC+5

Barak (Kyrgyz: Барак) was, until 2024, a Kyrgyz village that was surrounded by the territory of Uzbekistan. Its de facto status as one of the world's relatively few international enclaves began in 1999. Administratively it was part of Kara-Suu District in Kyrgyzstan's Osh Region. It was encircled by the Andijan Region of Uzbekistan. Its population was 985 in 2021. In August 2018 Kyrgyz and Uzbek authorities agreed to a land swap that would eliminate the enclave. The land swap became permanent in April 2024, when the Barak enclave was absorbed by Uzbekistan. Nearly all of its former residents were resettled within Kyrgyzstan.

The small town, located in the Fergana Valley, was estimated to consist of 153 families (approximately 1,000 residents). It is located about 4 km northeast of the road from Osh (Kyrgyzstan) to Xoʻjaobod (Uzbekistan) near the Kyrgyz–Uzbek border in the direction toward Qoʻrgʻontepa. This places it approximately 1.5 km from the Uzbek/Kyrgyz border, near Ak-Tash village.

== Border dispute ==
Kyrgyzstan's 1991 pre-independence border is the de jure international border, but much of it is hotly disputed with its neighbors. In August 1999, the area around Barak was occupied by Uzbekistan, cutting it off from Kyrgyz territory. Uzbek forces dug up and blockaded the road to Ak-Tash, while also seizing large areas of Kyrgyz land that allegedly had been loaned in the Soviet era but never returned. They entrenched themselves within much of Kyrgyz border territory and refused to leave. Barak became a de facto enclave only 1.5 km from the shifted main border. Four Uzbek enclaves and Barak are major sticking points in border delimitation talks, and disputes center on the areas of Barak, Soʻx, Gava and Gavasay (stream). In 2011, many villagers asked the government to re-settle them within the main border. Kyrgyz officials fear, however, that if the people leave Barak then Kyrgyzstan will not be able to keep its enclave.

== Effect on villagers ==
In 2011, Barak had a population of 153 families and over 1,000 people. The enclave is surrounded by Uzbekistan. "[In Barak] there's a village school, there's a [cultural center] and there's little shop. But there are no post offices and no government buildings or any other type of employment. There is no bank. Barak is tiny."

Barak became an enclave when Uzbekistan forces blockaded the road leading to Ak-Tash, the nearest Kyrgyz village and the border connection on which it depends. In the following three years, border controls were greatly increased, with a daily routine of exhaustive border checks for residents. In February 2003, villagers went to Osh to protest the Uzbek border restrictions. There, a chance meeting with Prime Minister Nikolai Tanayev led to Uzbekistan removing the concrete blockade and re-opening the road. The following month, officials of the two states signed a protocol to ease restrictions on Barak residents. In practice, however, nothing changed to simplify procedures for their entry and exit.

== Soviet-era borders ==
Border demarcations that were once of little significance are now affecting the lives of ordinary people in dramatic ways. The USSR's national-territorial delimitation of 1924–1927 was the first chapter of an ongoing story of twentieth-century border-moving, which continued beyond the Soviet Union's collapse.

Although the Soviet era saw numerous demarcation commissions, none fully resolved questions regarding isolated territorial enclaves, temporary land leases that were never returned, unpaid rent agreements, and conflicting maps showing the borders running in different places. Soviet border commissions in the 1920s and 1950s failed to finish their work. The map-makers of this era likely never thought their lines would one day be international borders. Government planning projects spilled freely across internal borders. Even when land rental contracts existed, rents often went uncollected and the land unreturned upon contact expiration.

Borders in the Fergana Valley in Soviet times bore little relevance to everyday life. Hence, later demarcation of its international borders has been complex. As a result, today large areas of land officially claimed by one state in the Fergana Valley are being farmed by citizens of the other states, an example of which lies along the Batken-Isfara (Kyrgyzstan-Tajikistan) border, where over 1300 hectares of land are disputed.

A similar situation exists along the Uzbekistan-Kyrgyzstan border, where before 1991 the Uzbek SSR had rented large amounts of land for agricultural and industrial use. Despite renting for fixed terms, the Uzbek SSR often never returned the land nor paid rent, accompanied by the inevitable growth of settlements over time. For example, in 1999 a Kyrgyz deputy claimed to have a copy of a 1960s agreement renting 45,000 hectares to the Uzbek SSR, which should have terminated in 1980. Kyrgyzstan also has some territories that it leased for cattle raising during the Soviet period and which it has not given up.

== Complications at independence ==
In 1991, independence presented a complicated and uncertain geography. The Fergana Valley republics were heir to decades-long patterns of land use that freely transgressed boundaries. Those boundaries had never been fully demarcated, and different maps showed different borders.

The effects of Soviet era planning were not felt in the years immediately following independence, apart from a brief crisis in 1993. Daily cross-border life in the valley continued almost uninterrupted, with large borderland areas being used by the people of neighboring states. This occurred both through illegal squatting and pre-existing fixed-term territorial leases. For example, Uzbekistan's Marhamat region was using 6885 hectares of land from Osh's Aravon region, the two of which share a border of only about 125 km (still in dispute in 2011). Until 1998 it still was possible to travel across state boundaries almost as though they were internal ones. However, Kyrgyzstan and Uzbekistan were slowly drifting apart through the 1990s as the two republics became differentiated.

== Conflict in 1999 ==
Major conflict erupted in 1999 that in part centered on Uzbekistan's unilateral demarcation of its border and its alleged seizure of large areas of Kyrgyz agricultural land loaned to Uzbekistan for temporary usage during the Soviet period but never returned.

"On February 13, 1999, Uzbekistan's president, Islam Karimov, confirmed that the major Osh-Andijon cross-border bus service, along with many other routes in the Ferghana Valley, had been suspended. … Closure of the border was accelerated three days later when a carefully-orchestrated series of bomb blasts rocked the Uzbekistani capital Tashkent, killing 16[.] … Uzbekistan immediately sealed its border, ... security was dramatically tightened up … and special units were deployed to sensitive border areas. New control posts were built and existing facilities upgraded, and in many places crossings were closed, roads dug up, and bridges demolished. … The effects of these unilateral measures were keenly felt by Kyrgyzstanis."

In the summer, the neighboring Batken region of Kyrgyzstan was invaded by guerrillas of the so-called Islamic Movement of Uzbekistan (IMU). Following this, the opposition press continued to carry numerous reports of Uzbekistan's border policies encroaching onto Kyrgyzstan. In August 1999, the area around Barak was occupied by Uzbekistan, cutting it off from Kyrgyz territory. Uzbek forces dug up and blockaded the road to Ak-Tash.

Throughout 1999, the Kyrgyzstani government did not physically attempt to contest the new border and concomitant control posts that Uzbekistan established. Rather, Kyrgyzstan sought to keep the border open to trade, while insisting on entering into talks to delimit the border. However, Uzbekistan quickly clamped down on crossings that it did not authorize. The unilateral restrictions massively obstructed the movement of both goods and people. Nevertheless, IMU extremists found ways to operate over the border throughout 1999. Uzbek troops and border guards began excursions into Kyrgyzstan to suppress the extremists. Although Kyrgyz authorities condemned the territorial violations, Uzbekistan continued them and stepped up its threats by mining the border and constructing barriers and watchtowers, sometimes deep within Kyrgyz territory. Uzbek forces entrenched themselves on this territory and refused to leave.

After the end of the IMU guerilla fighting in Batken, a new development emerged that threatened to spark an even graver crisis between the two states than the events in the spring. Not only did Uzbekistan control the border, it began a unilateral demarcation of its border in the Fergana Valley. This did not go unnoticed by Kyrgyzstani journalists and politicians, who persistently objected and accused Uzbekistan of advancing border checkpoints along roads into Kyrgyz territory. Around the start of October and onward, Uzbekistan began erecting a "2-meter high barbed-wire perimeter fence along large stretches of the Valley boundary, and mining other stretches. This led to widespread accusations within Kyrgyzstan that Uzbekistan was actually fencing off tens of thousands of hectares of Kyrgyzstani land."

== Kyrgyz-Uzbek delimitation talks ==
By February 2000, Kyrgyzstan and Uzbekistan had begun to work jointly to demarcate the Kyrgyz-Uzbek border; however, progress was very slow. One year later, a meeting between the two countries' prime ministers ended with a promise to meet again to discuss border demarcation, which had become the thorniest issue in bilateral relations. About 150 spots along the Uzbek-Kyrgyz border were disputed. A renewed effort resulted in a signed memorandum which would have given Uzbekistan a land corridor running the 40 kilometres along the Sokh River to its enclave of Sokh. In exchange for that corridor, Kyrgyzstan was to receive a smaller corridor to Barak." The memorandum caused political backlash in Kyrgyzstan and was never implemented.

By February 2002, only 209 out of 1,400 kilometres had been jointly demarcated, although 994 kilometres had been studied. But the most controversial points remained: in the Osh and Batken regions, 406 kilometres were waiting to be studied by the joint commission. "The work also revealed the main disputed areas as being the enclaves of Barak and Sokh and the areas of Gava and Gavasay. Regarding these sites, the positions of the parties remained far from convergence."

According to a 2004 report by the International Crisis Group (ICG), border demarcation negotiations had been charged with tension. Talks had stalled over approximately 50 contested locations along the border between Kyrgyzstan and Uzbekistan.

In 2006, the process of delimitation had been under way for six years, with agreement reached on only 993 kilometers of the state border, which was 1375 kilometers long. The remaining 382 kilometers of the state border were not on existing maps and therefore remained subject to conflict and mutual distrust.

In 2009, a report stated, "a lack of funding has greatly hindered border demarcation efforts. … Complex terrain and conflicting Soviet-era maps – printed at a time when defining the borders was not a pressing issue – present the toughest obstacle to delimitation." Nevertheless, an intergovernmental commission on the delimitation and demarcation of the border held its first meeting after a five-year break on 29 December 2010.

In 2013, the two states' prime ministers were reported to be discussing the situation in the Barak enclave. Barak was not the only enclave that was a sticking point in negotiations. The Uzbek enclave of Sokh and three other Uzbek enclaves inside Kyrgyzstan were also major problems. Uzbekistan and Kyrgyzstan had delimited 1058 kilometers of the border (out of a total length of 1378.44 kilometers), which accounts for over 70 percent of the total length. By early 2014, in the ten years after 2004, talks still had not resulted in the delimitation of nearly 50 border sections with about 300 km length.

Talks resumed in 2018, and the two countries reached an agreement to exchange Barak for land in Uzbekistan's Andijon region near the Kyrgyz village of Birleshken (Ala-Buka District).

In January 2023, the two countries finally demarcated all the border, ending the dispute. The land swap that had been agreed upon in 2018 became permanent in April 2024, when the Barak enclave was absorbed by Uzbekistan. In November 2024, Kyrgyzstan President Sadyr Japarov inaugurated the Zhany-Barak village in the Osh Region of Kyrgyzstan for resettled residents of Barak.

In February 2024, Kyrgyzstan and Tajikistan reached 90% agreement on their 980-kilometer border, resolving another 3.71 kilometers of contested territory. Progress followed decades of disputes, with officials emphasizing cooperation and addressing broader issues like water resources and bilateral relations.
