= Kirov, Kara-Suu =

Kirov Kyrgyz: Киров
- Location within Kyrgyzstan
- Coordinates: 40°42′00″N 72°53′00″E
- Country: Kyrgyzstan
- Region: Osh
- District: Kara-Suu

Population (2021)
  - Total: 8,719
- Time zone: UTC+6

Kirov (Kyrgyz: Киров, romanized: Kirov) is a village in Osh Region of Kyrgyzstan. It is part of the Kara-Suu District. Its population was 8,719 in 2021.

== Population ==
Historical population
Year	Pop.	±% p.a.
2009	9,287	—
2021	8,719	−0.52%
Note: resident population; Sources:
