= Uchkun, Osh =

Uchkun
- Location within Kyrgyzstan
- Coordinates: 40°30′30″N 73°8′40″E
- Country: Kyrgyzstan
- Region: Osh Region
- District: Kara-Suu District
- Elevation: 1,591 m (5,220 ft)

Population (2021)
  - Total: 0
- Time zone: UTC+6

Uchkun is a village in the Osh Region of Kyrgyzstan. It is part of the Kara-Suu District. Its population was 0 in 2021.
