= Kenjekul =

Kenjekul Kyrgyz: Кенжекул
- Location within Kyrgyzstan
- Coordinates: 40°38′18″N 72°48′48″E
- Country: Kyrgyzstan
- Region: Osh
- District: Kara-Suu
- Elevation: 840 m (2,760 ft)

Population (2021)
  - Total: 2,789
- Time zone: UTC+6

Kenjekul (Kyrgyz: Кенжекул) is a village in the Osh Region of Kyrgyzstan. It is part of the Kara-Suu District. Its population was 2,789 in 2021.
