= Alim-Tepe =

Alim-Töbö Kyrgyz: Алим-Тепе
- Location within Kyrgyzstan
- Coordinates: 40°36′36″N 72°45′36″E
- Country: Kyrgyzstan
- Region: Osh
- District: Kara-Suu
- Elevation: 868 m (2,848 ft)

Population (2021)
  - Total: 2,669
- Time zone: UTC+6

Alim-Töbö (Kyrgyz: Алим-Тепе, romanized: Alim-Tepe) is a village in Osh Region of Kyrgyzstan. It is part of the Kara-Suu District. Its population was 2,669 in 2021.
