= Jangy-Kyshtak =

Jangy-Kyshtak Kyrgyz: Жаңы-Кыштак
- Location within Kyrgyzstan
- Coordinates: 40°33′00″N 72°43′50″E
- Country: Kyrgyzstan
- Region: Osh
- District: Kara-Suu

Population (2021)
  - Total: 11,647
- Time zone: UTC+6

Jangy-Kyshtak (Kyrgyz: Жаңы-Кыштак) is a village in Osh Region of Kyrgyzstan. It is part of the Kara-Suu District. Its population was 11,647 in 2021.

== Population ==
Historical population
| Year | Pop. | ±% p.a. |
|---|---|---|
| 2009 | 7,325 | — |
| 2021 | 11,647 | +3.94% |
Note: resident population; Sources:
