= Asanchek =

Asanchek Kyrgyz: Асанчек
- Location within Kyrgyzstan
- Coordinates: 40°33′20″N 72°53′00″E
- Country: Kyrgyzstan
- Region: Osh
- District: Kara-Suu

Population (2021)
  - Total: 6,163
- Time zone: UTC+6

Asanchek (Kyrgyz: Асанчек) is a village in Osh Region of Kyrgyzstan. It is part of the Kara-Suu District. Its population was 6,163 in 2021.

== Population ==
Historical population
Year	Pop.	±% p.a.
2009	5,501	—
2021	6,163	+0.95%
Note: resident population; Sources:
