= Ak-Buura =

River in Kyrgyzstan and Uzbekistan

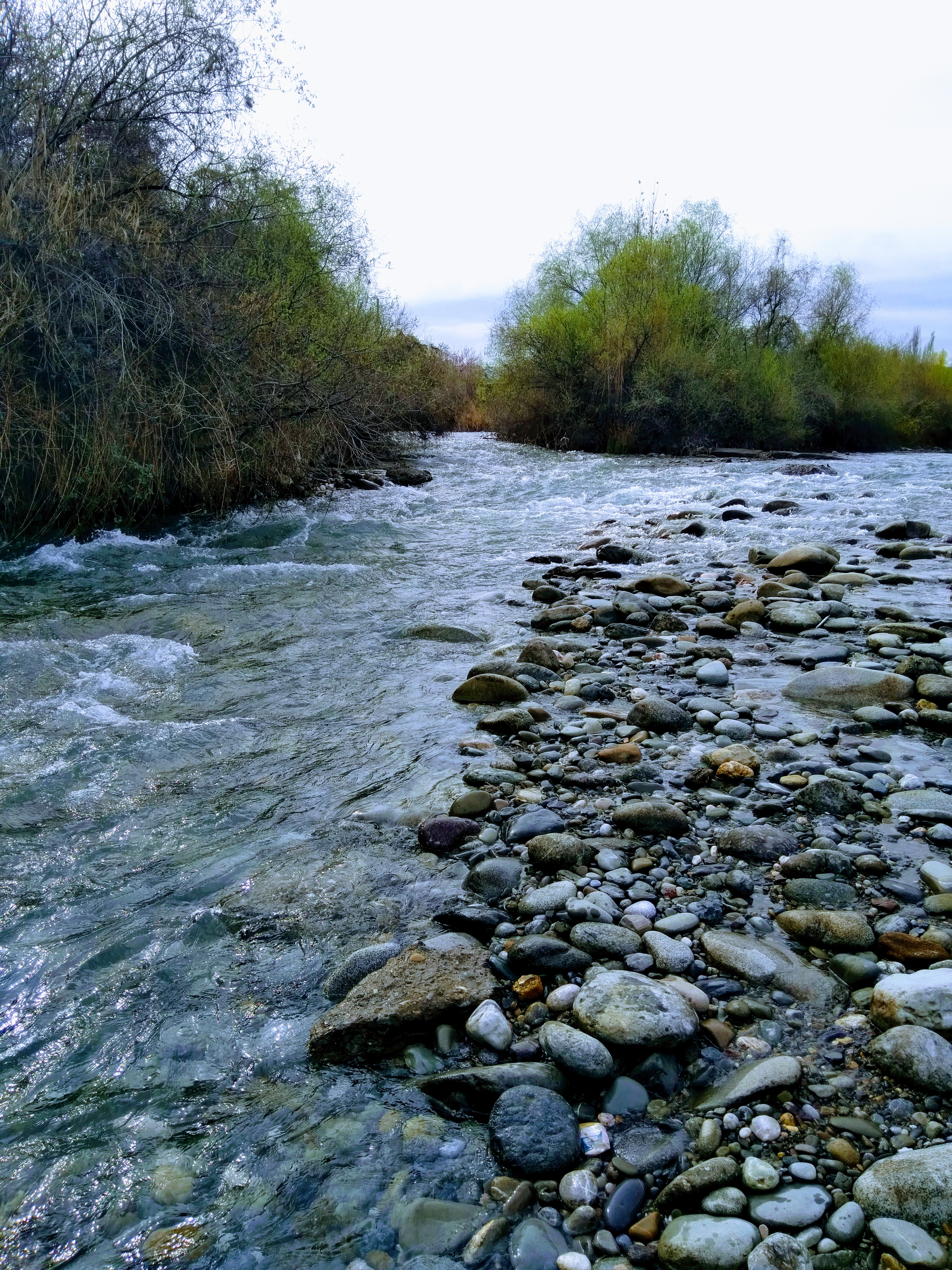
- The Ak-Buura during spring 2018.

Location
- Country: Kyrgyzstan, Uzbekistan

Physical characteristics
- Source: Alai Mountains
- Mouth: Shahrixonsoy
  - coordinates: 40.6717°N 72.6137°E
- Length: approx. 148 km (92 mi)
- Basin size: 2,530 km^{2} (980 sq mi)
- Discharge
  - location: Tölöykön
  - average: 21.4 m^{3}/s (760 cu ft/s)

Basin features
- Progression: Shahrixonsoy→ Great Fergana Canal→ Syr Darya→ North Aral Sea

The Ak-Buura (Kyrgyz: Ак-Буура) is a river in Kyrgyzstan and Uzbekistan. It flows through the city Osh, and discharges into the Shahrixonsoy, one of the canals of the Fergana Valley. The river is formed at the north slopes of Alai Mountains. The river is 148 kilometres (92 mi) long, and the watershed covers 2,530 square kilometres (980 mi^{2}). The long-term average discharge of the river at Tölöykön gauging post (southern boundary of Osh) is 21.4 cubic metres per second (760 cu ft/s), high-water discharge (June–July) ranging from 50 cubic metres per second (1,800 cu ft/s) to 67 cubic metres per second (2,400 cu ft/s) and low-water discharge (January) from 5 cubic metres per second (180 cu ft/s) to 6 cubic metres per second (210 cu ft/s). The main settlements along the river Ak-Buura are the city Osh and the villages Tölöykön, Turuk and Papan.
