= Madaniyat =

- Location within Kyrgyzstan
- Coordinates: 40°35′24″N 72°51′36″E
- Country: Kyrgyzstan
- Region: Osh Region
- District: Kara-Suu District
- Elevation: 918 m (3,012 ft)

Population (2021)
  - Total: 4,599
- Time zone: UTC+6

Madaniyat is a village in the Osh Region of Kyrgyzstan. It is part of the Kara-Suu District. Its population was 4,599 in 2021.
