= Đinh Xuân Tửu =

Vietnamese writer and poet (1925–1996)

Đinh Xuân Tửu (2 February 1925 – 5 November 1996) was a Vietnamese writer and poet (pen-names: Văn Lâm, Kỳ Phong, Thành Lễ, Tô Huyền An). He was born in Hà Tĩnh Province, Vietnam. He was a poet loved by children, one of the founders of the Kim Đồng Publishing House, and a member of the Vietnam Writers' Association (1957).

== Works ==
His first work was the poem "Nhớ tình cũ" published in Tràng An newspaper – Huế city (1940). Following are some works stored in Vietnam National Library, among them most known are: Em vẫn là em; Ông Đồ Nghệ.

1. Làng vui (1955)
2. Em vẽ hình chữ S : NXB Kim Đồng, 1957; 27pg; 24 cm
3. Vợ chồng lửa và nước : Translated; NXB Kim Đồng, 1958; 20pg; 19 cm
4. Tarat Bunba : Translated; NXB Văn hoá, 1959; 160pg; 19 cm
  2nd Edition: NXB Văn học, 1966; 191pg;15 cm;
  3rd Edition: NXB Văn học, 2000; 200pg; 19 cm
5. Kinh nghiệm viết cho các em : NXB Văn học, 1960; 116pg; 19 cm
6. Về thăm quê : NXB Phổ thông, 1957; 21pg; 19 cm
7. Tiếng chuông ngân : NXB Phổ thông, 1960; 20pg; 19 cm
8. Quê hương : Ty văn hoá Hà Tĩnh, 1961; 39pg; 19 cm
9. Dũng sĩ Ec - Quyn : NXB Kim Đồng, 1961; 95pg; 30 cm
10. Thời niên thiếu của bút chì : NXB Kim Đồng, 1961, 35pg; 19 cm
11. Đôi bạn : Ty văn hoá Hà Tĩnh, 1961; 15pg; 19 cm
12. Đội trưởng đội chiếu bóng 59 : NXB Văn hoá nghệ thuật, 1962; 101pg; 19 cm
13. Mác, Ănghen, Lênin và văn học, nghệ thuật : Translated; NXB Sự thật, 1962; 210pg; 19 cm
14. Đứa con : NXB Kim Đồng, 1963; 64pg; 19 cm
15. Chắp cánh cho chim : NXB Kim Đồng, 1965; 44pg; 19 cm
16. Nhân dân với cách mạng : NXB Phổ thông, 1966; 79pg; 19 cm
17. Kể chuyện Bác Hồ (truyện, 1965)
18. Tấm lòng người mẹ : NXB Kim Đồng, 1973; 39pg; 19 cm
19. Nắng thu : Ty văn hoá Thái Bình, 1970
20. Trang sách trung thu: NXB Kim Đồng, 1970; 50pg; 19 cm
21. Văn học và trẻ em : Translated; NXB Kim Đồng, 1982; 102pg; 19 cm
22. Những kỷ niệm đẹp : NXB Nghệ Tĩnh, 1983; 72pg; 19 cm
23. Nhóm năm người và kho vàng trên đảo : Translated from Enid Blyton; NXB Cửu Long, 1986; 198pg; 19 cm
24. Em vẫn là em : NXB Kim Đồng, 1990; 28pg; 19 cm
25. Nghệ thuật yêu thương: Translated, 1994
26. Anh chàng Tây Ban Nha : Translated; NXB Văn học, 1994; 485pg; 19 cm
27. Ông đồ Nghệ : NXB. Hội nhà văn, 1997; 123pg; 19 cm
28. Thơ văn Xuân Tửu: NXB Hội nhà văn, 2006, 720 pg, 20,5 cm
