= Mady, Kyrgyzstan =

Mady Kyrgyz: Мады
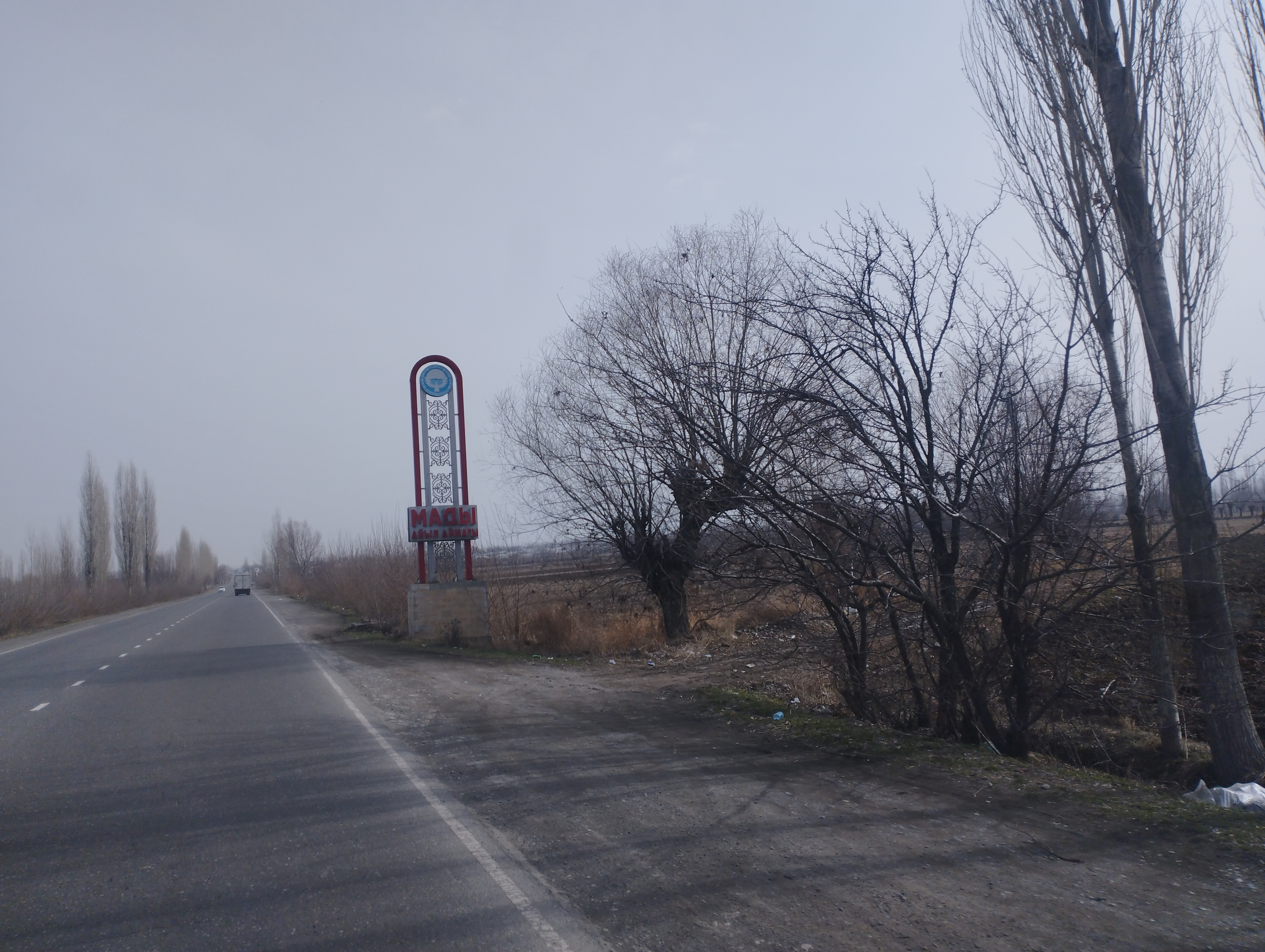
- Mady, Kyrgyzstan

- Location within Kyrgyzstan
- Coordinates: 40°32′20″N 72°56′40″E
- Country: Kyrgyzstan
- Region: Osh Region
- District: Kara-Suu District
- Elevation: 1,005 m (3,297 ft)

Population (2021)
  - Total: 2,876
- Time zone: UTC+6

Mady (Kyrgyz: Мады) is a village in Osh Region of Kyrgyzstan. It is part of the Kara-Suu District. Its population was 2,876 in 2021. It was here that Qurmancan Datqa died - one of the famous political figures in Kyrgyz history.
