= ONE 160 =

Combat sport events in 2022

ONE 160: Ok vs. Lee 2
- The poster for ONE 160: Ok vs. Lee 2
- Promotion: ONE Championship
- Date: August 26, 2022
- Venue: Singapore Indoor Stadium
- City: Kallang, Singapore

Event chronology
ONE 159: de Ridder vs. Bigdash	ONE 160: Ok vs. Lee 2	ONE on Prime Video 1: Moraes vs. Johnson 2

ONE 160: Ok vs. Lee 2 was a Combat sport event produced by ONE Championship that took place on August 26, 2022, at the Singapore Indoor Stadium in Kallang, Singapore.

== Background ==
A ONE Lightweight World Championship rematch between current champion Ok Rae-yoon and former champion (also 2019 ONE Lightweight World Grand Prix Champion) Christian Lee headlined the event. The pairing previously met at ONE: Revolution in September 2021 where Ok defeated Lee by unanimous decision.

A ONE Featherweight World Championship bout between current champion Thanh Le and Tang Kai at the co-main event.

The event featured a semi-final of the ONE Flyweight Muay Thai World Grand Prix Tournament between Superlek Kiatmoo9 and former ONE Flyweight Muay Thai World Championship challenger Walter Goncalves. The winner will advance to the World Grand Prix Tournament final. However, the bout was pushed back to ONE on Prime Video: Moraes vs. Johnson 2 for to compete together in tournaments.

A Welterweight bout between former ONE Welterweight World Champion Zebaztian Kadestam and former ONE Lightweight World Championship challenger Iuri Lapicus was expected to take place at the event. However, on August 10, it was announced that the bout will be moved to ONE on Prime Video 1: Moraes vs. Johnson 2.

A lightweight submission grappling bout between Valdir Rodrigues and Renato Canuto was expected to take place at the event. However, Rodrigues withdraw due to undisclosed reason and was replaced by Tommy Langaker.

== Results ==
Main card (YouTube / Watch ONE)
Weight class				Method	Round	Time	Notes
Lightweight	Christian Lee	def.	Ok Rae-yoon (c)	TKO (knees)	2	1:00	(Note: For the ONE Lightweight World Championship)
Featherweight	Tang Kai	def.	Thanh Le (c)	Decision (unanimous)	5	5:00	(Note: For the ONE Featherweight World Championship)
Bantamweight Muay Thai	Saemapetch Fairtex	def.	Rittewada Petchyindee	KO (punch)	2	1:35
Featherweight	Keanu Subba	def.	Amir Khan	KO (punches)	1	3:29
Heavyweight	Martin Batur	vs.	Paul Elliott	No Contest (overturned)	1	3:38	(Note: Originally a TKO (punches and elbows) win for Batur; later changed to no contest after Batur tested positive for an Anabolic steroid, which is a banned substance according to the World Anti-Doping Agency (WADA).)
Lightweight Submission Grappling	Tommy Langaker	def.	Renato Canuto	Decision (unanimous)	1	10:00
Bantamweight	Kantharaj Agasa	def.	Thales Nakassu	TKO (punches)	1	2:55

== Bonus awards ==
The following fighters received $50,000 bonuses.

- Performance of the Night: Christian Lee, Saemapetch Fairtex, Martin Batur and Tommy Langaker

== Aftermath ==
On September 27, 2022, it was announced that Martin Batur's technical knockout against Paul Elliott was overturned by International Doping Tests & Management (IDTM) after Batur has tested positive for a performance-enhancing drug (PED) and he tested positive for an Anabolic steroid, which is a banned substance according to the World Anti-Doping Agency (WADA). He has been banned by ONE Championship for a year.

== See also ==
- 2022 in ONE Championship
- List of ONE Championship events
- List of current ONE fighters
