= Börü, Kyrgyzstan =

Börü Kyrgyz: Бөрү
- Location within Kyrgyzstan
- Coordinates: 40°19′48″N 72°58′12″E
- Country: Kyrgyzstan
- Region: Osh Region
- District: Kara-Suu District
- Elevation: 1,317 m (4,321 ft)

Population (2021)
  - Total: 2,237
- Time zone: UTC+6

Börü (Kyrgyz: Бөрү, romanized: Börü) is a village in Osh Region of Kyrgyzstan. It is part of the Kara-Suu District. Its population was 2,237 in 2021. The town of Papan is 4.5 kilometres (2.8 miles) to the south.
