= Hushyar Cheleh =

Hushyar Chelleh هوشيارچله
- Village
- Location within Iran
- Coordinates: 34°03′46″N 46°04′41″E
- Country: Iran
- Province: Kermanshah
- County: Gilan-e Gharb
- Bakhsh: Central
- Rural District: Cheleh

Population (2006)
  - Total: 447
- Time zone: UTC+3:30 (IRST)
  - Summer (DST): UTC+4:30 (IRDT)

Hushyar Chelleh (Persian: هوشيارچله, also Romanized as Hūshyār Cheleh and Hūshyār Chelleh; also known as Cheleh-ye ‘Alīshāh and Cheshmeh-Ye-Alīshāh) is a village in Cheleh Rural District, in the Central District of Gilan-e Gharb County, Kermanshah Province, Iran. At the 2006 census, its population was 447, in 92 families.
