= Telman, Osh =

Telman Тельман
- Location within Kyrgyzstan
- Coordinates: 40°41′10″N 72°51′40″E
- Country: Kyrgyzstan
- Region: Osh
- District: Kara-Suu

Population (2021)
  - Total: 5,693
- Time zone: UTC+6

Telman (Kyrgyz: Тельман) is a village in Osh Region of Kyrgyzstan. It is part of the Kara-Suu District. Its population was 5,693 in 2021.

== Population ==
Historical population
Year	Pop.	±% p.a.
2009	3,923	—
2021	5,693	+3.15%
Note: resident population; Sources:
