= Çayoba =

- Municipality
- Location within Azerbaijan
- Coordinates: 38°38′04″N 48°48′48″E
- Country: Azerbaijan
- Rayon: Astara

Population
  - Total: 1,224
- Time zone: UTC+4 (AZT)
  - Summer (DST): UTC+5 (AZT)

Çayoba (known as Telman until 2015) is a village and municipality in the Astara Rayon of Azerbaijan. It has a population of 1,224.
