= Laglan =

Laglan Kyrgyz: Лаглан
- Location within Kyrgyzstan
- Coordinates: 40°16′50″N 73°5′50″E
- Country: Kyrgyzstan
- Region: Osh Region
- District: Kara-Suu District

Population (2021)
  - Total: 1,393
- Time zone: UTC+6

Laglan (Kyrgyz: Лаглан) is a village in Osh Region of Kyrgyzstan. It is part of the Kara-Suu District. Its population was 1,393 in 2021.
