= ONE Fight Night 12 =

Combat sport events in 2023

ONE Fight Night 12: Superlek vs. Khalilov
- The poster for ONE Fight Night 12: Superlek vs. Khalilov
- Promotion: ONE Championship
- Date: July 15, 2023
- Venue: Lumpinee Boxing Stadium
- City: Bangkok, Thailand

Event chronology
ONE Friday Fights 25: Nakrob vs. Phetputhai	ONE Fight Night 12: Superlek vs. Khalilov	ONE Friday Fights 26: Kulabdam vs. Bohic

ONE Fight Night 12: Superlek vs. Khalilov was a combat sports event produced by ONE Championship that took place on July 15, 2023, at Lumpinee Boxing Stadium in Bangkok, Thailand.

== Background ==
A ONE Heavyweight World Championship unification bout between current champion Arjan Bhullar and interim champion Anatoly Malykhin was scheduled to headline the event. The pair were previously scheduled to square off at ONE 161 and then ONE Fight Night 8, but were moved to this event due to a change in broadcast commitments. However, on May 19, 2023, it was announced that the fight was moved to ONE Friday Fights 22.

A rematch for the ONE Featherweight World Championship between current champion Tang Kai and former champion Thanh Le was scheduled to headline the event. However, Tang withdrew from the fight due to a knee injury and the fight was cancelled.

A ONE Light Heavyweight Kickboxing World Championship bout between current champion Roman Kryklia and Françesko Xhaja was expected to headline the event. However, Xhaja withdraw from the bout due to injury. As a result, a flyweight muay thai bout between current ONE Flyweight Kickboxing Champion Superlek Kiatmuu9 and Tagir Khalilov promoted to main event status. Khalilov who scheduled to fight Elias Mahmoudi at this event.

A featherweight bout between former ONE Featherweight title challenger and #2 ranked Garry Tonon and #5 ranked Shamil Gasanov served as the co-main event.

A women's atomweight muay thai bout between former WMC (-45 kg) World champion Phetjeeja Lukjaoporongtom and the reigning ISKA Oriental rules World Super Featherweight (−59 kg) champion Lara Fernandez took place at the event.

At the weigh-ins, Superlek Kiatmuu9, Walter Goncalves and Yuya Wakamatsu missed weight. Superlek weighed in at 135.25 lbs, 0.25 pounds over the limit, Goncalves weighed in at 135.75 pounds, 0.75 pounds over the limit, and Wakamatsu weighed in at 135.5 pounds, 0.5 pounds over the limit. All the bouts proceeded at catchweight with each being fined their purse of his purse, which went to their opponents Tagir Khalilov, Banma Duoji and Xie Wei respectively.

== Results ==
Main card (Amazon Prime Video)
Weight class				Method	Round	Time	Notes
Catchweight (135.25 lb) Muay Thai	Superlek Kiatmuu9	def.	Tagir Khalilov	TKO (punch and elbow)	2	1:42	(Note: Superlek missed weight (135.25 lb).)
Featherweight	Garry Tonon	def.	Shamil Gasanov	Submission (kneebar)	2	2:26
Heavyweight	Amir Aliakbari	def.	Dustin Joynson	TKO (submission to punches)	1	1:48
Catchweight (135.5 lb)	Yuya Wakamatsu	def.	Xie Wei	TKO (punches)	1	2:03	(Note: Wakamatsu missed weight (135.5 lb).)
Featherweight	Akbar Abdullaev	def.	Aaron Cañarte	TKO (spinning back kick and punches)	1	0:41
Women's Atomweight Muay Thai	Phetjeeja Lukjaoporongtom	def.	Lara Fernandez	TKO (punches)	1	0:26
Catchweight (135.75 lb)	Banma Duoji	def.	Walter Goncalves	Decision (unanimous)	3	5:00	(Note: Goncalves missed weight (135.75 lb).)
Women's Strawweight Submission Grappling	Tammi Musumeci	def.	Amanda Alequin	Decision (unanimous)	1	10:00
Lightweight Kickboxing	Bogdan Shumarov	def.	Constantin Rusu	TKO (head kick)	3	1:33

== Bonus awards ==
The following fighters received $50,000 bonuses.

- Performance of the Night: Garry Tonon, Amir Aliakbari, Akbar Abdullaev, Phetjeeja Lukjaoporongtom and Bogdan Shumarov

== See also ==
- 2023 in ONE Championship
- List of ONE Championship events
- List of current ONE fighters
