= Regions of Uzbekistan =

Independent city, autonomous republic, and regions of Uzbekistan
- Category: Unitary state
- Location: Uzbekistan
- Number: 12 regions 1 autonomous republic 1 independent city
- Populations: 942,630 (Sirdaryo) – 4,396,800 (Samarqand)
- Areas: Regions only: 4,200 km^{2} (1,621 sq mi) (Andijan) – 110,800 km^{2} (42,780 sq mi) (Navoiy)
- Government: Regional governments, autonomous government, national government
- Subdivisions: Tuman

Uzbekistan is divided into 12 regions (viloyatlar, singular – viloyat, viloyati in compound, e.g. Toshkent viloyati), 1 autonomous republic (respublika, respublikasi in compound, e.g. Qaraqalpaqstan Avtonom Respublikasi), and 1 independent city (shahar or shahri in compounds, e.g. Toshkent shahri).

== List ==
Names are given below in the Uzbek language, although numerous variations of the transliterations of each name exist. The regions in turn are divided into 175 districts (tumanlar, singular tuman).

| Key | Name | Capital city | Area (km^{2}) | Population (2026) | Population density |
|---|---|---|---|---|---|
| 1 | Tashkent | — | 327 | 3,195,900 | 9,773 |
| 2 | Andijan Region | Andijan | 4,303 | 3,533,900 | 821 |
| 3 | Bukhara Region | Bukhara | 41,937 | 2,112,200 | 50 |
| 4 | Fergana Region | Fergana | 7,005 | 4,239,400 | 605 |
| 5 | Jizzakh Region | Jizzakh | 21,179 | 1,559,883 | 74 |
| 6 | Namangan Region | Namangan | 7,181 | 3,202,700 | 446 |
| 7 | Navoiy Region | Navoiy | 109,375 | 1,118,595 | 10 |
| 8 | Qashqadaryo Region | Qarshi | 28,568 | 3,731,800 | 131 |
| 9 | Samarqand Region | Samarkand | 16,773 | 4,396,800 | 262 |
| 10 | Sirdaryo Region | Guliston | 4,276 | 942,630 | 220 |
| 11 | Surxondaryo Region | Termez | 20,099 | 3,024,900 | 151 |
| 12 | Tashkent Region | Nurafshon | 15,258 | 3,174,600 | 208 |
| 13 | Xorazm Region | Urgench | 6,464 | 2,075,000 | 321 |
| 14 | Republic of Karakalpakstan | Nukus | 161,358 | 2,046,890 | 13 |

A clickable map of Uzbekistan exhibiting its regions.

== Enclaves and exclaves ==
There are four Uzbek exclaves, all of them surrounded by Kyrgyz territory in the Fergana Valley region where Kyrgyzstan, Tajikistan and Uzbekistan meet. Two of them are the towns of Sokh, area of 325 km^{2} (125 sq mi) with a population of 42,800 in 1993 (with some estimates as high as 70,000, of which 99% are Tajiks and the remainder Uzbeks) and Shohimardon, area of 90 km^{2} (35 sq mi) with a population of 5,100 in 1993 (91% are Uzbeks and the remainder Kyrgyz). The other two are the tiny territories of Chon-Qora (or Qalacha), roughly 3 km (1.9 mi) long and 1 km (0.62 mi) wide, and Jangail, a dot of land barely 3 km (1.9 mi) across. Chon-Qora is on the Sokh river, between the Uzbek border and the Sokh exclave. Chong-Qora and Jangail are now part of Kirghizistan.

Uzbekistan has a Tajikistan enclave, the village of Sarvan, which includes a narrow, long strip of land about 15 km (9.3 mi) long and 1 km (0.62 mi) wide, along the road from Angren to Kokand.

The Kyrgyz village of Barak (population 627) lies 15 km north of Osh. In August 1999, the area around Barak was occupied by Uzbekistan, cutting it off from Kyrgyz territory. Uzbek forces dug up and blockaded the road to Ak-Tash while also allegedly seizing large areas of Kyrgyz land that had been loaned in the Soviet era but never returned. They entrenched themselves within much of Kyrgyz border territory and refused to leave. Barak became a de facto enclave only 1.5 km from the shifted main border. (Map) In August 2018 Kyrgyz and Uzbek authorities agreed to a land swap that would eliminate the exclave. The exchange process may take up to two years.

== See also ==
- ISO 3166-2:UZ
