= Börü, Azerbaijan =

Börü Հայ Պարիս • Hay Paris
- Municipality
- Location within Azerbaijan
- Coordinates: 40°27′02″N 46°33′17″E
- Country: Azerbaijan
- District: Goranboy

Population
  - Total: 74
- Time zone: UTC+4 (AZT)

Börü (formerly known as Armyanskiye Borisi, Azerbaijani: Erməni Borisi; Armenian: Հայ Պարիս, romanized: Hay Paris) is a village and the least populous municipality in the Goranboy District of Azerbaijan. The village had an Armenian majority prior to the First Nagorno-Karabakh War and Operation Ring.
