= Tölöykön, Kara-Suu =

Tölöykön Төлөйкөн
- Location within Kyrgyzstan
- Coordinates: 40°28′50″N 72°49′20″E
- Country: Kyrgyzstan
- Region: Osh Region
- District: Kara-Suu District
- Elevation: 901 m (2,956 ft)

Population (2021)
  - Total: 5,673
- Time zone: UTC+6

Tölöykön is a village in southern Kyrgyzstan, a southern suburb of the city Osh. It is partly in the Kara-Suu District (population 2,295 in 2021), and partly in the city of Osh (population 3,378 in 2021).
