= Kara-Suu =

Town in Osh Region, Kyrgyzstan

Kara-Suu Kyrgyz: Кара-Суу
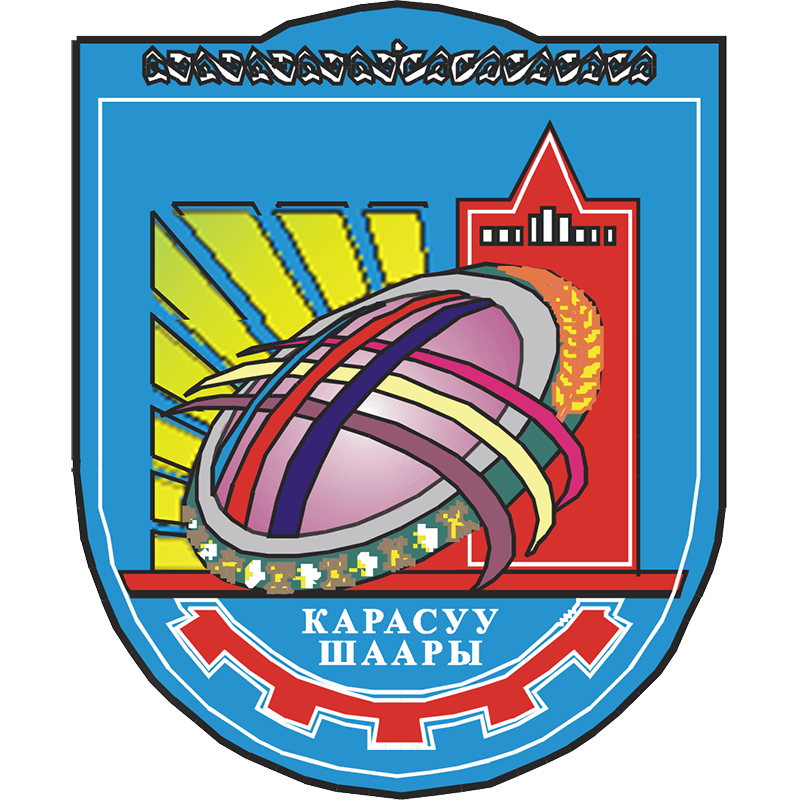
- Seal

- Location in Kyrgyzstan
- Coordinates: 40°42′N 72°53′E
- Country: Kyrgyzstan
- Region: Osh Region
- Elevation: 744 m (2,442 ft)

Population (2021)
  - Total: 26,609
- Time zone: UTC+6
- Website: karasuu.kg

Kara-Suu (Kyrgyz: Кара-Суу, lit. 'Black Water') is a town in Osh Region, Kyrgyzstan, in the Fergana Valley. The town is 23 km northeast of Osh and is the capital of Kara-Suu District. Its population was 26,609 in 2021. It is a major industrial and trade center, on the border with Uzbekistan. On the other side of the border is the town Qorasuv.

== History ==
During World War II, in 1942, the Artillery Training Centre of the Polish Anders' Army was based in Kara-Suu. Polish soldiers trained there before fighting Nazi Germany.

After the dissolution of the Soviet Union, the Uzbek authorities destroyed the main bridge across the river, but cross-border trade continued via improvised ropeways that ferried goods and people across.

Kara-Suu gained international prominence following the May 2005 unrest in Uzbekistan and massacre in nearby Andijan, after which refugees streamed across the border into Kyrgyzstan.

== Climate ==
Climate data for Kara-Suu (1991–2020)
Month	Jan	Feb	Mar	Apr	May	Jun	Jul	Aug	Sep	Oct	Nov	Dec	Year
Daily mean °C (°F)	−1.3 (29.7)	1.1 (34.0)	7.9 (46.2)	14.3 (57.7)	18.9 (66.0)	23.5 (74.3)	25.6 (78.1)	24.1 (75.4)	19.5 (67.1)	12.8 (55.0)	6.0 (42.8)	0.5 (32.9)	12.7 (54.9)
Source: NOAA

== Economy ==
The Karasuu Bazaar in the Kyrgyz town of Kara-Suu is a highly important center of import of Chinese consumer goods into Southern Kyrgyzstan, Uzbekistan and Tajikistan, comparable with Dordoy Bazaar in Bishkek (which targets Northern Kyrgyzstan, Kazakh and Russian markets).

== Demographics ==
The permanent population of Kara-Suu, according to the Population and Housing Census of 2009, was 20,862. The average age was 26.5 years.

Historical populations in Kara-Suu
Year	Pop.	±%
1970	16,168	—
1979	18,586	+15.0%
1989	18,914	+1.8%
1999	19,143	+1.2%
2009	20,862	+9.0%
2021	26,609	+27.5%
Note: resident population; Source:

== Sports ==
- Abdygany Radzhapov Central Stadium
- Myktybek Orolbai
