= Jangail =

Jangail Таш-Төбө Tash-Tobo
- Village
- Interactive map of Jangail
- Location within Kyrgyzstan Location within Asia
- Coordinates: 40°12′03″N 71°40′10″E
- Country: Kyrgyzstan
- Region: Batken Region
- Transfer to Kyrgyzstan announced: 23 June 2026

Area
  - Total: 1 km^{2} (0.39 sq mi)
- Time zone: UTC+6 (KGT)

Jangail (Russian: Джангайл, romanized: Dzhangayl) was a small exclave of Uzbekistan (Fergana Region), which was fully surrounded by Kyrgyz territory (Batken Region. As part of the demarcation agreements of the state border between Kyrgyz Republic and Uzbekistan, the enclave was officially transferred to Kyrgyzstan on 23 June 2026. It lies adjacent to the village Jangy-Ayyl.

== Geography ==
It was about 60 kilometres east of Batken and within 1 kilometer of the Uzbek main border. It measures only 2 to 3 kilometres across. The estimate terrain elevation above the sea level is 873 metres. The area of the exclave was less than 1 square kilometer.
