= Papan =

Papan Kyrgyz: Папан
- Location within Kyrgyzstan
- Coordinates: 40°18′0″N 72°58′48″E
- Country: Kyrgyzstan
- Region: Osh Region
- District: Kara-Suu District
- Elevation: 1,355 m (4,446 ft)

Population (2021)
  - Total: 448
- Time zone: UTC+6

Papan (Kyrgyz: Папан, romanized: Papan) is a village in Osh Region of Kyrgyzstan. It is part of the Kara-Suu District. Its population was 448 in 2021.
