= Kara-Suu District =

Coordinates: 40°42′N 72°53′E

Kara-Suu Kyrgyz: Кара-Суу району
- District
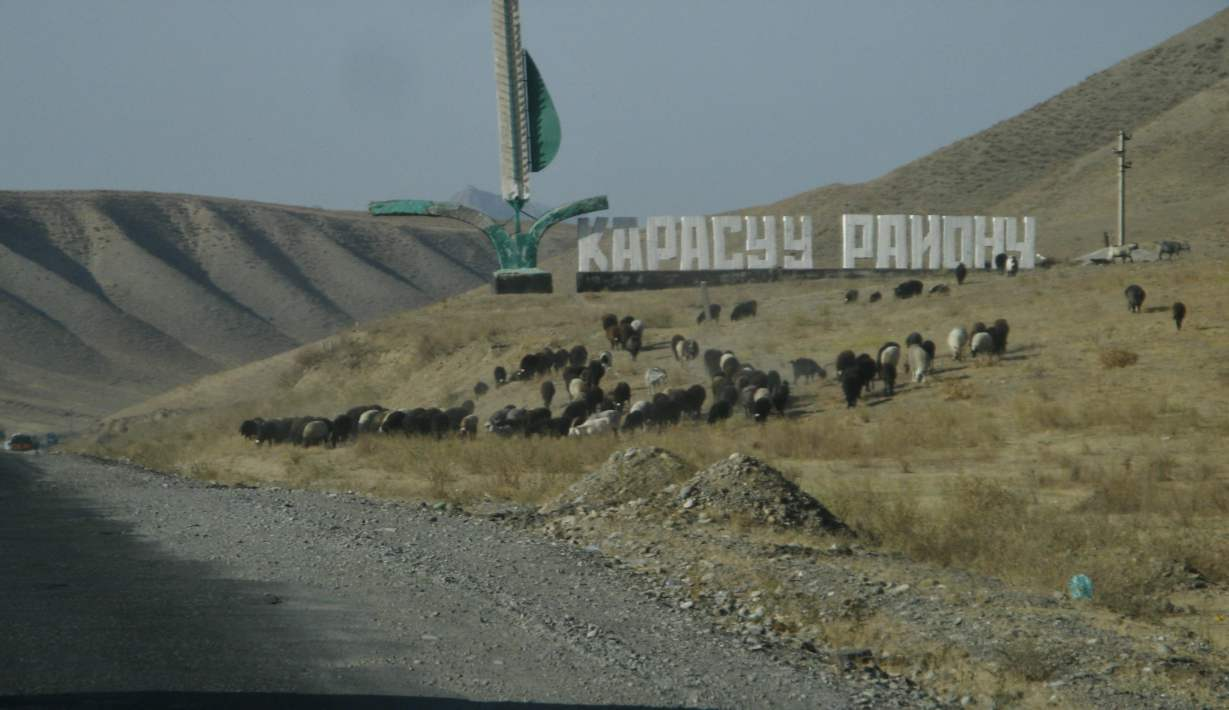

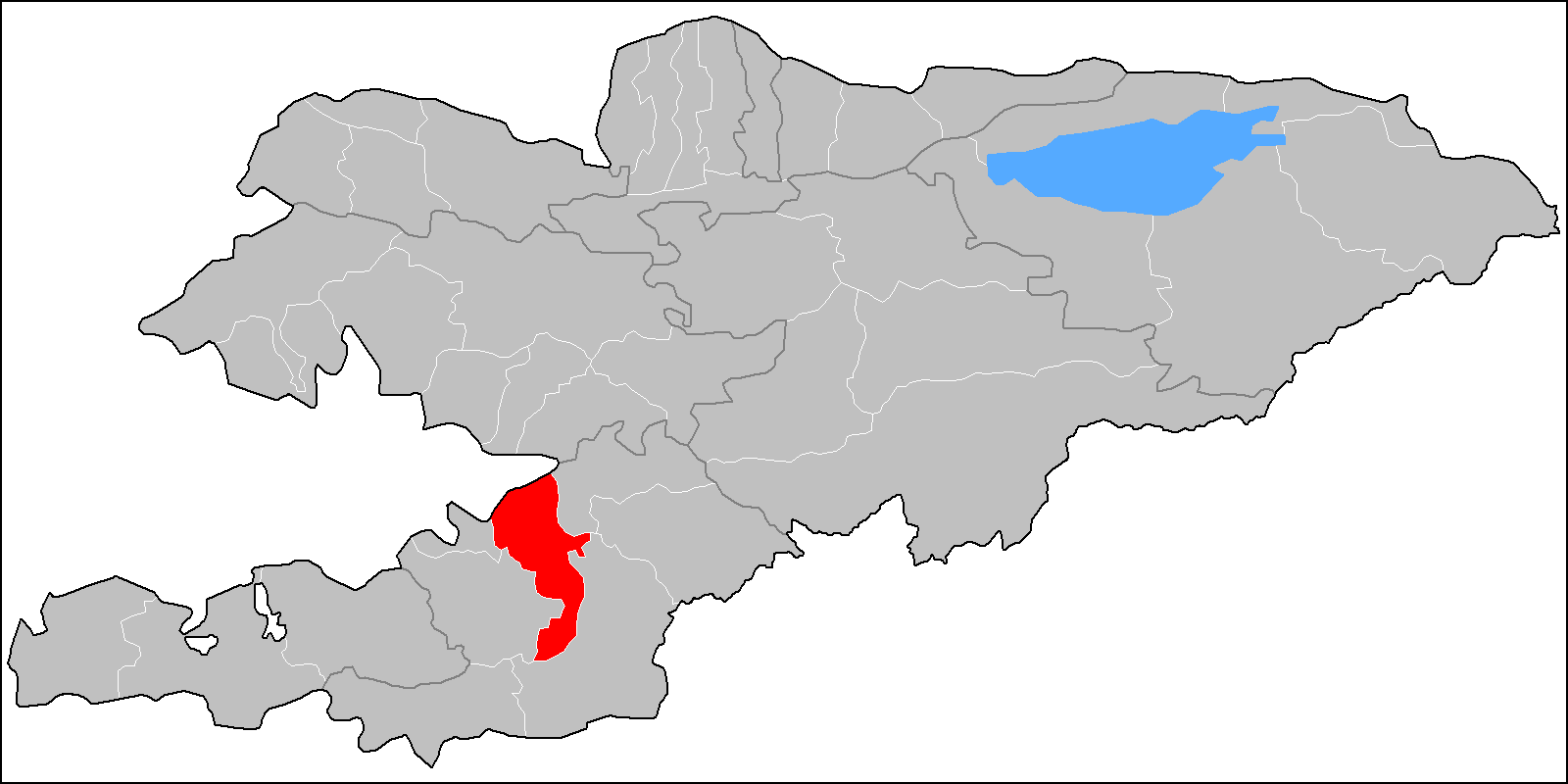
- Country: Kyrgyzstan
- Region: Osh Region

Area
  - Total: 3,616 km^{2} (1,396 sq mi)

Population (2021)
  - Total: 448,608
  - Density: 124.1/km^{2} (321.3/sq mi)
- Time zone: UTC+6

Kara-Suu (Kyrgyz: Кара-Суу району, romanized: Kara-Suu rayonu) is a district of Osh Region in south-western Kyrgyzstan. Its area is 3,616 square kilometres (1,396 sq mi), and its resident population was 448,608 in 2021. The administrative seat lies at the city Kara-Suu.

== Population ==
The district has a sizeable Uzbek minority (38.5% in 2009).

Historical population
Year	Pop.	±% p.a.
1970	134,832	—
1979	172,752	+2.79%
1989	217,575	+2.33%
1999	294,043	+3.06%
2009	348,645	+1.72%
2021	448,608	+2.12%
Note: resident population; Sources:

== Towns, rural communities and villages ==
In total, Kara-Suu District include 1 city and 137 settlements in 16 rural communities (ayyl aymagy). Each rural community can consist of one or several villages. The rural communities and settlements in the Kara-Suu District are:

1. town Kara-Suu
2. Ak-Tash (seat: Ak-Tash; incl. Jylkeldi and Barak)
3. Jangy-Aryk (seat: Jangy-Aryk; incl. Ak-Terek, Pravda and Tash-Aryk)
4. Joosh (seat: Bolshevik; incl. Agartuu, Gayrat, Zarbalyk, Kalinin, Kommunizm, Kyzyl-Koshchu, Kyzyl-Saray, Madaniyat, Mamajan and Pitomnik)
5. Kashgar-Kyshtak (seat: Kashgar-Kyshtak; incl. Alga-Bas, Anjyyan-Maala, Bek-Jar, Jar-Ooz, Kenjekul, Tajik-Maala and Monok)
6. Katta-Taldyk (seat: Bash-Bulak; incl. Jangy-Turmush, Kara-Sögöt, Taldyk, Kichik, Kyzyl-Ordo, Sadyrbay, Eshme, Achy and Torgoy-Bulak)
7. Kyzyl-Kyshtak (seat: Kyzyl-Kyshtak; incl. Anjyyan, Bel-Kyshtak, Jangy-Kyshtak, Karl Marks, Kommunist and Kyzyl-Bayrak)
8. Kyzyl-Suu (seat: Chaychy; incl. Ak-Jar, Korgon, Miyaly, Alpordo, Talaa and Uchkun)
9. Mady (seat: Kyrgyz-Chek; incl. Asanchek, Joosh, Kaarman, Laglan, Mady, Oktyabr, Sotsializm, Teeke, Uchkun and Chagyr)
10. Nariman (seat: Nariman; incl. Alim-Tepe, Besh-Moynok, VLKSM, Jangy-Maala, Jiydalik, Karatay, Osmon, Kurankol, Kyzyl-Mekhnat, Langar, Nurdar, Jim and Tajikabad)
11. Otuz-Adyr (seat: Otuz-Adyr; incl. Kara-Döbö, Kyzyl-Abad, Kysh-Abad, Savay-Aryk, Furkhat, Yntymak, Jangy-Kyzyl-Suu and Tynchtyk)
12. Papan (seat: Papan; incl. Ak-Terek, Alchaly, Ata-Merek, Börü, Karagur, Kojo-Keleng, Kyzyl-Tuu, Toguz-Bulak, Ak-Buura-1, Ak-Buura-2, Ak-Buura-3, Ak-Buura-4, Kamyr-Suu, Jar-Bashy, Chychkan-Kol, Andagul and Jany-Turmush)
13. Sary-Kolot (seat: Sary-Kolot; incl. Ak-Kolot, Kurban-Kara, Sheraly, Prisavay and Tynchtyk)
14. Saray (seat: Kirov; incl. Erkin, Prisavay, Kongurat, Telman and Ak-Orgoo)
15. Savay (seat: Kyzyl-Shark; incl. Keng-Say, Köchkön-Jar, Kurban-Kara, Kydyrsha, Oktyabr, Yntymak, Savay and Sultan-Abad)
16. Shark (seat: Shark; incl. Tashtak, Imam-Ata, Madaniyat, Top-Terek, Furkat and Medrese)
17. Tölöykön (seat: Dyykan-Kyshtak; incl. Kyrgyzstan, Özgür, Tölöykön, Uchar, Bodur-Tash and Japalak)
Settlements of the Kara-Suu District
