= 2024 in ONE Championship =

Mixed martial arts events

Information
- First date: January 13, 2024
- Last date: December 20, 2024

Events
- Total events: 60
- ONE Fight Night: 9
- ONE Friday Fights: 46

Fights
- Total fights: 682
- Title fights: 25

The year 2024 was the 14th year in the history of the ONE Championship, a mixed martial arts, kickboxing, Muay Thai and submission grappling promotion based in Cayman Islands.

== Events list ==
=== Past events ===
#	Event	Date	Venue	City	Country	Performance of the Night		Bonus	Ref.
311	ONE Friday Fights 92: Sitthichai vs. Shadow	December 20, 2024	Lumpinee Boxing Stadium	Bangkok	Thailand	Suakim Sor.Jor.Tongprajin	—N/a	$20,000	
311	ONE Friday Fights 92: Sitthichai vs. Shadow	December 20, 2024	Lumpinee Boxing Stadium	Bangkok	Thailand	Songchainoi Kiatsongrit	Egor Bikrev	$10,000	
311	ONE Friday Fights 92: Sitthichai vs. Shadow	December 20, 2024	Lumpinee Boxing Stadium	Bangkok	Thailand	Rak Erawan	Watcharapon P.K.Saenchai	$10,000	
311	ONE Friday Fights 92: Sitthichai vs. Shadow	December 20, 2024	Lumpinee Boxing Stadium	Bangkok	Thailand	Shimon Yoshinari	—N/a	$10,000	
310	ONE Friday Fights 91: Komawut vs. Balyko	December 13, 2024	Lumpinee Boxing Stadium	Bangkok	Thailand	Freddie Haggerty	Padejsuk N.F.Looksuan	$10,000	
310	ONE Friday Fights 91: Komawut vs. Balyko	December 13, 2024	Lumpinee Boxing Stadium	Bangkok	Thailand	Lee Seung-chul	—N/a	$10,000	
309	ONE Fight Night 26: Lee vs. Rasulov	December 7, 2024	Lumpinee Boxing Stadium	Bangkok	Thailand	Cole Abate	Dante Leon	$50,000	
309	ONE Fight Night 26: Lee vs. Rasulov	December 7, 2024	Lumpinee Boxing Stadium	Bangkok	Thailand	Thongpoon P.K.Saenchai	—N/a	$50,000	
308	ONE Friday Fights 90: Kongklai vs. Kacem	December 6, 2024	Lumpinee Boxing Stadium	Bangkok	Thailand	Antar Kacem	Asadula Imangazaliev	$10,000	
308	ONE Friday Fights 90: Kongklai vs. Kacem	December 6, 2024	Lumpinee Boxing Stadium	Bangkok	Thailand	Xavier Gonzalez	Alessio Malatesta	$10,000	
308	ONE Friday Fights 90: Kongklai vs. Kacem	December 6, 2024	Lumpinee Boxing Stadium	Bangkok	Thailand	Ubaid Hussain	—N/a	$10,000	
307	ONE Friday Fights 89: Yod-IQ vs. Khomutov	November 29, 2024	Lumpinee Boxing Stadium	Bangkok	Thailand	Tonglampoon FA.Group	Mungkorn Boomdeksean	$10,000	
307	ONE Friday Fights 89: Yod-IQ vs. Khomutov	November 29, 2024	Lumpinee Boxing Stadium	Bangkok	Thailand	Dionatha Santos Tobias	Lothong Kruaynaimuanggym	$10,000	
307	ONE Friday Fights 89: Yod-IQ vs. Khomutov	November 29, 2024	Lumpinee Boxing Stadium	Bangkok	Thailand	Pol Pascual	Rustam Yunusov	$10,000	
307	ONE Friday Fights 89: Yod-IQ vs. Khomutov	November 29, 2024	Lumpinee Boxing Stadium	Bangkok	Thailand	Marwin Quirante	—N/a	$10,000	
306	ONE Friday Fights 88: Pompet vs. Ortikov	November 22, 2024	Lumpinee Boxing Stadium	Bangkok	Thailand	Raksaensuk Sor.Tor.Hiewbangsaen	Abdelali Zahidi	$10,000	
306	ONE Friday Fights 88: Pompet vs. Ortikov	November 22, 2024	Lumpinee Boxing Stadium	Bangkok	Thailand	Hiroki Naruo	Harlysson Nunes	$10,000	
305	ONE Friday Fights 87: Kongchai vs. Chokpreecha	November 15, 2024	Lumpinee Boxing Stadium	Bangkok	Thailand	Kongchai Chanaidonmuang	Chokpreecha P.K.Saenchai	$10,000	
305	ONE Friday Fights 87: Kongchai vs. Chokpreecha	November 15, 2024	Lumpinee Boxing Stadium	Bangkok	Thailand	Singdomthong Nokjeanladkrabang	Payaksurin Sit. JP	$10,000	
305	ONE Friday Fights 87: Kongchai vs. Chokpreecha	November 15, 2024	Lumpinee Boxing Stadium	Bangkok	Thailand	Marwin Dittrich	—N/a	$10,000	
304	ONE 169: Malykhin vs. Reug Reug	November 9, 2024	Lumpinee Boxing Stadium	Bangkok	Thailand	Kade Ruotolo	Marcus Buchecha	$50,000	
304	ONE 169: Malykhin vs. Reug Reug	November 9, 2024	Lumpinee Boxing Stadium	Bangkok	Thailand	Ayaka Miura	—N/a	$50,000	
303	ONE Friday Fights 86: Kompetch vs. Chartpayak	November 8, 2024	Lumpinee Boxing Stadium	Bangkok	Thailand	Chatpichit Sor.Sor.Toipadriew		$20,000	
303	ONE Friday Fights 86: Kompetch vs. Chartpayak	November 8, 2024	Lumpinee Boxing Stadium	Bangkok	Thailand	Egor Bikrev	Mahesuan Aekmuangnon	$10,000	
303	ONE Friday Fights 86: Kompetch vs. Chartpayak	November 8, 2024	Lumpinee Boxing Stadium	Bangkok	Thailand	Nonthachai Jitmuangnon	—N/a	$10,000	
302	ONE Friday Fights 85: Yodlekpet vs. Puengluang	November 1, 2024	Lumpinee Boxing Stadium	Bangkok	Thailand	Yodlekpet Or.Atchariya	Akif Guluzada	$10,000	
302	ONE Friday Fights 85: Yodlekpet vs. Puengluang	November 1, 2024	Lumpinee Boxing Stadium	Bangkok	Thailand	Toyota EagleMuayThai	Detchanan Wor.Wiangsa	$10,000	
302	ONE Friday Fights 85: Yodlekpet vs. Puengluang	November 1, 2024	Lumpinee Boxing Stadium	Bangkok	Thailand	Lekkla BS.MuayThai	George Jarvis	$10,000	
301	ONE Friday Fights 84: Kongsuk vs. Muangthai	October 25, 2024	Lumpinee Boxing Stadium	Bangkok	Thailand	Muangthai P.K.Saenchai	Banluelok Sitwatcharachai	$10,000	
301	ONE Friday Fights 84: Kongsuk vs. Muangthai	October 25, 2024	Lumpinee Boxing Stadium	Bangkok	Thailand	Kochasit Tasaeyasat	Parham Gheirati	$10,000	
300	ONE Friday Fights 83: Panrit vs. Superball	October 18, 2024	Lumpinee Boxing Stadium	Bangkok	Thailand	Panrit Lukjaomaesaiwaree	Mungkorn Boomdeksean	$10,000	
300	ONE Friday Fights 83: Panrit vs. Superball	October 18, 2024	Lumpinee Boxing Stadium	Bangkok	Thailand	Hern N.F.Looksuan	—N/a	$10,000	
299	ONE Fight Night 25: Nicholas vs. Eersel 2	October 5, 2024	Lumpinee Boxing Stadium	Bangkok	Thailand	John Lineker	Johan Estupiñan	$50,000	
298	ONE Friday Fights 82: Yod-IQ vs. Dayakaev	October 4, 2024	Lumpinee Boxing Stadium	Bangkok	Thailand	Denkriangkrai Singha Mawynn	Alessio Malatesta	$10,000	
298	ONE Friday Fights 82: Yod-IQ vs. Dayakaev	October 4, 2024	Lumpinee Boxing Stadium	Bangkok	Thailand	Lucas Gabriel	—N/a	$10,000	
297	ONE Friday Fights 81: Superbon vs. Nattawut	September 27, 2024	Lumpinee Boxing Stadium	Bangkok	Thailand	Superbon Singha Mawynn		$50,000	
297	ONE Friday Fights 81: Superbon vs. Nattawut	September 27, 2024	Lumpinee Boxing Stadium	Bangkok	Thailand	Sam-A Gaiyanghadao	Kulabdam Sor.Jor.Piek-U-Thai	$10,000	
296	ONE Friday Fights 80: Rak vs. Yodnumchai	September 20, 2024	Lumpinee Boxing Stadium	Bangkok	Thailand	Chartpayak Saksatoon	Teeyai Wankhongohm MBK	$10,000	
296	ONE Friday Fights 80: Rak vs. Yodnumchai	September 20, 2024	Lumpinee Boxing Stadium	Bangkok	Thailand	Lamnamkhong BS.MuayThai	Petninmungkorn Dr.RatNamkangIceland	$10,000	
295	ONE Friday Fights 79: Kongchai vs. Abdulmuslimov	September 13, 2024	Lumpinee Boxing Stadium	Bangkok	Thailand	Maemmot Sor.Salacheep	Isannuea Tor.Tanjaroen	$10,000	
295	ONE Friday Fights 79: Kongchai vs. Abdulmuslimov	September 13, 2024	Lumpinee Boxing Stadium	Bangkok	Thailand	Asadula Imangazaliev	Dzhabir Dzhabrailov	$10,000	
294	ONE 168: Denver	September 6, 2024	Ball Arena	Denver, Colorado	United States	Superlek Kiatmuu9	Saeksan Or. Kwanmuang	$50,000	
294	ONE 168: Denver	September 6, 2024	Ball Arena	Denver, Colorado	United States	John Lineker	Adrian Lee	$50,000	
294	ONE 168: Denver	September 6, 2024	Ball Arena	Denver, Colorado	United States	Johan Ghazali	Johan Estupiñan	$50,000	
293	ONE Friday Fights 78: Pakorn vs. Reis	September 6, 2024	Lumpinee Boxing Stadium	Bangkok	Thailand	Fabio Reis	Tonglampoon F.A.Group	$10,000	
293	ONE Friday Fights 78: Pakorn vs. Reis	September 6, 2024	Lumpinee Boxing Stadium	Bangkok	Thailand	Yodkitti FiatPathum	Aslamjon Ortikov	$10,000	
293	ONE Friday Fights 78: Pakorn vs. Reis	September 6, 2024	Lumpinee Boxing Stadium	Bangkok	Thailand	Yota Shigemori	—N/a	$10,000	
292	ONE Friday Fights 77: Yodlekpet vs. Kongsuk	August 30, 2024	Lumpinee Boxing Stadium	Bangkok	Thailand	Rambong Sor.Therapat	Khundet P.K.Saenchai	$10,000	
292	ONE Friday Fights 77: Yodlekpet vs. Kongsuk	August 30, 2024	Lumpinee Boxing Stadium	Bangkok	Thailand	Teeyai Wankhongohm MBK	Nehramit AnnyMuayThai	$10,000	
292	ONE Friday Fights 77: Yodlekpet vs. Kongsuk	August 30, 2024	Lumpinee Boxing Stadium	Bangkok	Thailand	Omar Kinteh	—N/a	$10,000	
291	ONE Friday Fights 76: Peungluang vs. Samingdam	August 23, 2024	Lumpinee Boxing Stadium	Bangkok	Thailand	Thway Lin Htet	Ganchai Jitmuangnon	$10,000	
291	ONE Friday Fights 76: Peungluang vs. Samingdam	August 23, 2024	Lumpinee Boxing Stadium	Bangkok	Thailand	Petchchakrit T.N.DiamondHome	Masatoshi Hirai	$10,000	
291	ONE Friday Fights 76: Peungluang vs. Samingdam	August 23, 2024	Lumpinee Boxing Stadium	Bangkok	Thailand	Korpai Sor. Yingcharoenkarnchang	—N/a	$10,000	
290	ONE Friday Fights 75: Kompetch vs. El Halabi	August 16, 2024	Lumpinee Boxing Stadium	Bangkok	Thailand	Nuapetch Tded99	Petchnakian Phuyaiyunan	$10,000	
290	ONE Friday Fights 75: Kompetch vs. El Halabi	August 16, 2024	Lumpinee Boxing Stadium	Bangkok	Thailand	Mamuka Usubyan	—N/a	$10,000	
289	ONE Friday Fights 74: Yodphupha vs. Gheirati	August 9, 2024	Lumpinee Boxing Stadium	Bangkok	Thailand	Donking YotharakMuayThai	Sainatee P.K.Saenchai	$10,000	
289	ONE Friday Fights 74: Yodphupha vs. Gheirati	August 9, 2024	Lumpinee Boxing Stadium	Bangkok	Thailand	Kirill Khomutov	Hiroyuki	$10,000	
288	ONE Fight Night 24: Brooks vs. Balart	August 3, 2024	Lumpinee Boxing Stadium	Bangkok	Thailand	Mayssa Bastos	Elias Mahmoudi	$50,000	
288	ONE Fight Night 24: Brooks vs. Balart	August 3, 2024	Lumpinee Boxing Stadium	Bangkok	Thailand	Aliff Sor.Dechapan	—N/a	$50,000	
287	ONE Friday Fights 73: Worapon vs. Panrit	August 2, 2024	Lumpinee Boxing Stadium	Bangkok	Thailand	Xavier Gonzalez	Sanpetch Sor.Salacheep	$10,000	
287	ONE Friday Fights 73: Worapon vs. Panrit	August 2, 2024	Lumpinee Boxing Stadium	Bangkok	Thailand	Watcharapon Singha Mawynn	Toyota EagleMuayThai	$10,000	
287	ONE Friday Fights 73: Worapon vs. Panrit	August 2, 2024	Lumpinee Boxing Stadium	Bangkok	Thailand	Petchmai MC.SuperlekMuayThai	Sonrak Fairtex	$10,000	
287	ONE Friday Fights 73: Worapon vs. Panrit	August 2, 2024	Lumpinee Boxing Stadium	Bangkok	Thailand	Alfie Ponting	Fahjarat Sor.Dechapan	$10,000	
286	ONE Friday Fights 72: Kongsuk vs. Ouraghi	July 26, 2024	Lumpinee Boxing Stadium	Bangkok	Thailand	Petchnamkhong Mongkolpetch	Freddie Haggerty	$10,000	
285	ONE Friday Fights 71: Songchainoi vs. Rak 2	July 19, 2024	Lumpinee Boxing Stadium	Bangkok	Thailand	Petchlamphun Muadablampang	Chartpayak Saksatoon	$10,000	
285	ONE Friday Fights 71: Songchainoi vs. Rak 2	July 19, 2024	Lumpinee Boxing Stadium	Bangkok	Thailand	Yoddoi Kaewsamrit	Rifdean Masdor	$10,000	
285	ONE Friday Fights 71: Songchainoi vs. Rak 2	July 19, 2024	Lumpinee Boxing Stadium	Bangkok	Thailand	Ilyas Musaev	Abdulla Dayakaev	$10,000	
285	ONE Friday Fights 71: Songchainoi vs. Rak 2	July 19, 2024	Lumpinee Boxing Stadium	Bangkok	Thailand	Asadula Imangazaliev	—N/a	$10,000	
284	ONE Friday Fights 70: Focus vs. Irvine	July 12, 2024	Lumpinee Boxing Stadium	Bangkok	Thailand	Stephen Irvine	Apidet FiatPathum	$10,000	
284	ONE Friday Fights 70: Focus vs. Irvine	July 12, 2024	Lumpinee Boxing Stadium	Bangkok	Thailand	Tun Min Aung	Kendu Irving	$10,000	
283	ONE Fight Night 23: Ok vs. Rasulov	July 6, 2024	Lumpinee Boxing Stadium	Bangkok	Thailand	Nico Carrillo	—N/a	$50,000	
282	ONE Friday Fights 69: Kulabdam vs. Anane	July 5, 2024	Lumpinee Boxing Stadium	Bangkok	Thailand	Nabil Anane	Maisangkum Sor. Yingcharoenkarnchang	$10,000	
282	ONE Friday Fights 69: Kulabdam vs. Anane	July 5, 2024	Lumpinee Boxing Stadium	Bangkok	Thailand	Sunday Boomdeksean	Soe Lin Oo	$10,000	
282	ONE Friday Fights 69: Kulabdam vs. Anane	July 5, 2024	Lumpinee Boxing Stadium	Bangkok	Thailand	Ikko Ota	Avazbek Kholmirzaev	$10,000	
282	ONE Friday Fights 69: Kulabdam vs. Anane	July 5, 2024	Lumpinee Boxing Stadium	Bangkok	Thailand	Katsuaki Aoyagi	—N/a	$10,000	
281	ONE Friday Fights 68: Prajanchai vs. Di Bella	June 28, 2024	Lumpinee Boxing Stadium	Bangkok	Thailand	Kiamran Nabati	Pakorn P.K.Saenchai	$10,000	
281	ONE Friday Fights 68: Prajanchai vs. Di Bella	June 28, 2024	Lumpinee Boxing Stadium	Bangkok	Thailand	Suriyanlek Por.Yenying	—N/a	$10,000	
280	ONE Friday Fights 67: Nakrob vs. Khalilov	June 14, 2024	Lumpinee Boxing Stadium	Bangkok	Thailand	Nakrob Fairtex	Samingdam Looksuan	$10,000	
280	ONE Friday Fights 67: Nakrob vs. Khalilov	June 14, 2024	Lumpinee Boxing Stadium	Bangkok	Thailand	Tonglampoon FA.Group	Otis Waghorn	$10,000	
280	ONE Friday Fights 67: Nakrob vs. Khalilov	June 14, 2024	Lumpinee Boxing Stadium	Bangkok	Thailand	Haruyuki Tanitsu	—N/a	$10,000	
279	ONE 167: Tawanchai vs. Nattawut 2	June 8, 2024	Impact Arena	Bangkok	Thailand	Mikey Musumeci	Kade Ruotolo	$10,000	
279	ONE 167: Tawanchai vs. Nattawut 2	June 8, 2024	Impact Arena	Bangkok	Thailand	Adrian Lee	—N/a	$10,000	
278	ONE Friday Fights 66: Kongchai vs. Hamidi	June 7, 2024	Lumpinee Boxing Stadium	Bangkok	Thailand	Akram Hamidi	Kaotaem Fairtex	$10,000	
278	ONE Friday Fights 66: Kongchai vs. Hamidi	June 7, 2024	Lumpinee Boxing Stadium	Bangkok	Thailand	Yod-IQ Or.Pimolsri	Miao Aoqi	$10,000	
277	ONE Friday Fights 65: Jaosuayai vs. Puengluang	May 31, 2024	Lumpinee Boxing Stadium	Bangkok	Thailand	Jaosuayai Mor.Krungthepthonburi	Watcharaphon P.K.Saenchai	$10,000	
277	ONE Friday Fights 65: Jaosuayai vs. Puengluang	May 31, 2024	Lumpinee Boxing Stadium	Bangkok	Thailand	Tahaneak Nayokathasala	Samransing Sitchalongsak	$10,000	
277	ONE Friday Fights 65: Jaosuayai vs. Puengluang	May 31, 2024	Lumpinee Boxing Stadium	Bangkok	Thailand	Carlo Bumina-ang	—N/a	$10,000	
276	ONE Friday Fights 64: Gheirati vs. Godtfredsen	May 24, 2024	Lumpinee Boxing Stadium	Bangkok	Thailand	Parham Gheirati	Petchninmungkorn CaptainKaneBoxing	$10,000	
276	ONE Friday Fights 64: Gheirati vs. Godtfredsen	May 24, 2024	Lumpinee Boxing Stadium	Bangkok	Thailand	Teeyai P.K.Saenchai	Johan Estupiñan	$10,000	
276	ONE Friday Fights 64: Gheirati vs. Godtfredsen	May 24, 2024	Lumpinee Boxing Stadium	Bangkok	Thailand	Satoshi Katashima	Shoya Ishiguro	$10,000	
275	ONE Friday Fights 63: Yodphupha vs. Şen	May 17, 2024	Lumpinee Boxing Stadium	Bangkok	Thailand	Sanpetch Sor.Salacheep	Patakake SinbiMuayThai	$10,000	
275	ONE Friday Fights 63: Yodphupha vs. Şen	May 17, 2024	Lumpinee Boxing Stadium	Bangkok	Thailand	Chartpayak Saksatoon	Gregor Thom	$10,000	
275	ONE Friday Fights 63: Yodphupha vs. Şen	May 17, 2024	Lumpinee Boxing Stadium	Bangkok	Thailand	David Cooke	—N/a	$10,000	
274	ONE Friday Fights 62: Mongkolkaew vs. ET 2	May 10, 2024	Lumpinee Boxing Stadium	Bangkok	Thailand	Chokpreecha P.K.Saenchai	Kongkula Jitmuangon	$10,000	
274	ONE Friday Fights 62: Mongkolkaew vs. ET 2	May 10, 2024	Lumpinee Boxing Stadium	Bangkok	Thailand	Yuki Morioka	—N/a	$10,000	
273	ONE Fight Night 22: Sundell vs. Diachkova	May 4, 2024	Lumpinee Boxing Stadium	Bangkok	Thailand	Akbar Abdullaev	—N/a	$50,000	
272	ONE Friday Fights 61: Phetsukumvit vs. Duangsompong	May 3, 2024	Lumpinee Boxing Stadium	Bangkok	Thailand	Petchpattaya SilkMuayThai	Petchnakian Phuyaiyunan	$10,000	
272	ONE Friday Fights 61: Phetsukumvit vs. Duangsompong	May 3, 2024	Lumpinee Boxing Stadium	Bangkok	Thailand	Muga Seto	—N/a	$10,000	
271	ONE Friday Fights 60: Suriyanlek vs. Rittidet	April 26, 2024	Lumpinee Boxing Stadium	Bangkok	Thailand	Suriyanlek Por.Yenying	Rittidet Sor.Sommai	$10,000	
271	ONE Friday Fights 60: Suriyanlek vs. Rittidet	April 26, 2024	Lumpinee Boxing Stadium	Bangkok	Thailand	Focus Adsanpatong	Kaoklai Chor.Hapayak	$10,000	
271	ONE Friday Fights 60: Suriyanlek vs. Rittidet	April 26, 2024	Lumpinee Boxing Stadium	Bangkok	Thailand	Yodnumchai Fairtex	Detchphupa ChotBangsaen	$10,000	
271	ONE Friday Fights 60: Suriyanlek vs. Rittidet	April 26, 2024	Lumpinee Boxing Stadium	Bangkok	Thailand	Suakim SorJor.Tongprachin	Panmongkol CMA.Academy	$10,000	
270	ONE Friday Fights 59: Yamin vs. Ouraghi	April 19, 2024	Lumpinee Boxing Stadium	Bangkok	Thailand	Yamin P.K.Saenchai	Pettasuea Seeopal	$10,000	
270	ONE Friday Fights 59: Yamin vs. Ouraghi	April 19, 2024	Lumpinee Boxing Stadium	Bangkok	Thailand	Yodkitti FiatPathumThani	Takuma Ota	$10,000	
270	ONE Friday Fights 59: Yamin vs. Ouraghi	April 19, 2024	Lumpinee Boxing Stadium	Bangkok	Thailand	Yuki Kasahara	—N/a	$10,000	
269	ONE Fight Night 21: Eersel vs. Nicolas	April 6, 2024	Lumpinee Boxing Stadium	Bangkok	Thailand	Tye Ruotolo	Ben Tynan	$50,000	
269	ONE Fight Night 21: Eersel vs. Nicolas	April 6, 2024	Lumpinee Boxing Stadium	Bangkok	Thailand	Kade Ruotolo	—N/a	$50,000	
268	ONE Friday Fights 58: Superbon vs. Grigorian 3	April 5, 2024	Lumpinee Boxing Stadium	Bangkok	Thailand	Nakrob Fairtex	Muangthai P.K.Saenchai	$10,000	
268	ONE Friday Fights 58: Superbon vs. Grigorian 3	April 5, 2024	Lumpinee Boxing Stadium	Bangkok	Thailand	Shadow Singmawynn (x2)	—N/a	$10,000	
267	ONE Friday Fights 57: Panrit vs. Balyko	March 29, 2024	Lumpinee Boxing Stadium	Bangkok	Thailand	Sungprab Lukpichit	Parham Gheirati	$10,000	
267	ONE Friday Fights 57: Panrit vs. Balyko	March 29, 2024	Lumpinee Boxing Stadium	Bangkok	Thailand	Moe Htet Aung	Tran Quac Tuan	$10,000	
266	ONE Friday Fights 56: Ferrari vs. Tupiev	March 22, 2024	Lumpinee Boxing Stadium	Bangkok	Thailand	Jelte Blommaert	Tonglampoon FA.Group	$10,000	
266	ONE Friday Fights 56: Ferrari vs. Tupiev	March 22, 2024	Lumpinee Boxing Stadium	Bangkok	Thailand	Prakaipetchlek EminentAir	Furkan Karabağ	$10,000	
266	ONE Friday Fights 56: Ferrari vs. Tupiev	March 22, 2024	Lumpinee Boxing Stadium	Bangkok	Thailand	Rak Erawan	Rifdean Masdor	$10,000	
266	ONE Friday Fights 56: Ferrari vs. Tupiev	March 22, 2024	Lumpinee Boxing Stadium	Bangkok	Thailand	Sonrak Fairtex	Kaenlek Sor.Chokmeechai	$10,000	
265	ONE Friday Fights 55: Avatar vs. Nabati	March 15, 2024	Lumpinee Boxing Stadium	Bangkok	Thailand	Rittidet Sor.Sommai	Bhumjaithai Mor.Tor.1	$10,000	
265	ONE Friday Fights 55: Avatar vs. Nabati	March 15, 2024	Lumpinee Boxing Stadium	Bangkok	Thailand	Chalarmdan Sor.Boonmeerit	Natalia Diachkova	$10,000	
265	ONE Friday Fights 55: Avatar vs. Nabati	March 15, 2024	Lumpinee Boxing Stadium	Bangkok	Thailand	Ryota Koshimizu	—N/a	$10,000	
264	ONE Fight Night 20: Todd vs. Phetjeeja	March 9, 2024	Lumpinee Boxing Stadium	Bangkok	Thailand	—N/a		—N/a	—N/a
263	ONE Friday Fights 54: Ortikov vs. Watcharapon	March 8, 2024	Lumpinee Boxing Stadium	Bangkok	Thailand	Yoddoi Kaewsamrit	Petchlampun Muadablampang	$10,000	
262	ONE 166: Qatar	March 1, 2024	Lusail Sports Arena	Lusail	Qatar	Anatoly Malykhin	Tang Kai	$50,000	
261	ONE Friday Fights 53: Phetsukumvit vs. Kongsuk	February 23, 2024	Lumpinee Boxing Stadium	Bangkok	Thailand	Kongsuk Fairtex	Sunday Boomdeksian	$10,000	
261	ONE Friday Fights 53: Phetsukumvit vs. Kongsuk	February 23, 2024	Lumpinee Boxing Stadium	Bangkok	Thailand	Mahesuan Ekmuangnon	Huo Xiaolong	$10,000	
261	ONE Friday Fights 53: Phetsukumvit vs. Kongsuk	February 23, 2024	Lumpinee Boxing Stadium	Bangkok	Thailand	Deniz Demirkapu	—N/a	$10,000	
260	ONE Fight Night 19: Haggerty vs. Lobo	February 17, 2024	Lumpinee Boxing Stadium	Bangkok	Thailand	Jonathan Haggerty	Saemapetch Fairtex	$50,000	
260	ONE Fight Night 19: Haggerty vs. Lobo	February 17, 2024	Lumpinee Boxing Stadium	Bangkok	Thailand	Martyna Kierczyńska	Thongpoon P.K.Saenchai	$50,000	
259	ONE Friday Fights 52: Kulabdam vs. Lobo	February 16, 2024	Lumpinee Boxing Stadium	Bangkok	Thailand	Kulabdam Sor.Jor.Piek-U-Thai	Chalawan Ngorbangkapi	$10,000	
259	ONE Friday Fights 52: Kulabdam vs. Lobo	February 16, 2024	Lumpinee Boxing Stadium	Bangkok	Thailand	Petchpattaya SilkMuayThai	Jongangsuek Sor.Thepsutin	$10,000	
259	ONE Friday Fights 52: Kulabdam vs. Lobo	February 16, 2024	Lumpinee Boxing Stadium	Bangkok	Thailand	Yodtongthai Sor.Sommai	Thant Zin	$10,000	
259	ONE Friday Fights 52: Kulabdam vs. Lobo	February 16, 2024	Lumpinee Boxing Stadium	Bangkok	Thailand	Soe Lin Oo	Luepong Kaewsamrit	$10,000	
258	ONE Friday Fights 51: Rambolek vs. Şen	February 9, 2024	Lumpinee Boxing Stadium	Bangkok	Thailand	Wanpadet Looksuan	Avatar P.K.Saenchai	$10,000	
257	ONE Friday Fights 50: Yodphupa vs. Komawut	February 2, 2024	Lumpinee Boxing Stadium	Bangkok	Thailand	Panrit Lukjaomaesaiwaree	Petchsaenchai M.U.Den KhonmaiBaowee	$10,000	
257	ONE Friday Fights 50: Yodphupa vs. Komawut	February 2, 2024	Lumpinee Boxing Stadium	Bangkok	Thailand	Win Sitjaynim	Ricardo Bravo	$10,000	
257	ONE Friday Fights 50: Yodphupa vs. Komawut	February 2, 2024	Lumpinee Boxing Stadium	Bangkok	Thailand	Carlo Bumina-ang	—N/a	$10,000	
256	ONE 165: Superlek vs. Takeru	January 28, 2024	Ariake Arena	Tokyo	Japan	Superlek Kiatmuu9	Kade Ruotolo	$50,000	
256	ONE 165: Superlek vs. Takeru	January 28, 2024	Ariake Arena	Tokyo	Japan	Shinya Aoki	Nieky Holzken	$50,000	
256	ONE 165: Superlek vs. Takeru	January 28, 2024	Ariake Arena	Tokyo	Japan	Marat Grigorian	Garry Tonon	$50,000	
255	ONE Friday Fights 49: Nakrob vs. Pettonglor	January 26, 2024	Lumpinee Boxing Stadium	Bangkok	Thailand	Nakrob Fairtex	Abdallah Ondash	$10,000	
255	ONE Friday Fights 49: Nakrob vs. Pettonglor	January 26, 2024	Lumpinee Boxing Stadium	Bangkok	Thailand	Khunponnoi Sor.Sommai	Kaimookkao Wor.Jakrawut	$10,000	
255	ONE Friday Fights 49: Nakrob vs. Pettonglor	January 26, 2024	Lumpinee Boxing Stadium	Bangkok	Thailand	Freddie Haggerty	Ramadan Ondash	$10,000	
254	ONE Friday Fights 48: Kongthoranee vs. Mazoriev	January 19, 2024	Lumpinee Boxing Stadium	Bangkok	Thailand	Kongthoranee Sor.Sommai	Sornsueknoi FA Group	$10,000	
254	ONE Friday Fights 48: Kongthoranee vs. Mazoriev	January 19, 2024	Lumpinee Boxing Stadium	Bangkok	Thailand	Kwanjai KwanjaiMuayThaiGym	Joachim Ouraghi	$10,000	
254	ONE Friday Fights 48: Kongthoranee vs. Mazoriev	January 19, 2024	Lumpinee Boxing Stadium	Bangkok	Thailand	Majid Karimi	—N/a	$10,000	
253	ONE Fight Night 18: Gasanov vs. Oh	January 13, 2024	Lumpinee Boxing Stadium	Bangkok	Thailand	Kwon Won-il	Rungrawee Sitsongpeenong	$50,000	
252	ONE Friday Fights 47: Suakim vs. Balyko	January 12, 2024	Lumpinee Boxing Stadium	Bangkok	Thailand	Alexey Balyko	Kompetch Fairtex	$10,000	
252	ONE Friday Fights 47: Suakim vs. Balyko	January 12, 2024	Lumpinee Boxing Stadium	Bangkok	Thailand	Khunsuk Sor.Dechapan	Numpangna EagleMuayThai	$10,000	
252	ONE Friday Fights 47: Suakim vs. Balyko	January 12, 2024	Lumpinee Boxing Stadium	Bangkok	Thailand	Apiwat Sor.Somnuk	—N/a	$10,000	

== 2024 ONE Championship awards ==
=== 2024 Fighter of the Year ===
#	Fighters	Sports	Ref.
1	(United States) Kade Ruotolo	MMA; Submission Grappling	
1	(Thailand) Superlek Kiatmuu9	Muay Thai; Kickboxing	

=== 2024 Breakout Star of the Year ===
#	Fighters	Sports	Ref.
1	(Senegal) Oumar Kane	MMA	
2	(Algeria) Nabil Anane	Muay Thai	
3	(Colombia) Johan Estupiñan	Muay Thai	
4	(United States) Adrian Lee	MMA	
5	(France) Alexis Nicolas	Kickboxing	

=== 2024 Fight of the Year ===
#				Method	Round	Time	Event	Ref.
1	(Thailand) Superlek Kiatmuu9	def.	(Japan) Takeru Segawa	Decision (unanimous)	5	3:00	ONE 165	
2	(England) Jonathan Haggerty	def.	(Brazil) Felipe Lobo	TKO (punch)	3	0:45	ONE Fight Night 19	
3	(Russia) Anatoly Malykhin	def.	(Netherlands) Reinier de Ridder	TKO (retirement)	3	1:16	ONE 166	
4	(Philippines) Lito Adiwang	def.	(Australia) Danial Williams	Decision (unanimous)	3	5:00	ONE Fight Night 19	
5	(Thailand) Tawanchai P.K.Saenchai	def.	(Thailand) Jo Nattawut	Decision (majority)	5	3:00	ONE 167	

=== 2024 Knockout of the Year ===
#				Method	Round	Time	Event	Ref.
1	(Thailand) Superlek Kiatmuu9	def.	(England) Jonathan Haggerty	KO (elbow)	1	0:49	ONE 168	
2	(Thailand) Superbon Singha Mawynn	def.	(Thailand) Jo Nattawut	KO (elbow)	1	1:43	ONE Friday Fights 81	
3	(China) Tang Kai	def.	(United States) Thanh Le	TKO (punches)	3	4:48	ONE 166	
4	(Scotland) Amy Pirnie	def.	(Hong Kong) Yu Yau Pui	KO (punch)	1	0:49	ONE Fight Night 24	
5	(Kyrgyzstan) Akbar Abdullaev	def.	(Turkey) Halil Amir	KO (punches)	2	2:52	ONE Fight Night 22	

=== 2024 Submission of the Year ===
#				Method	Round	Time	Event	Ref.
1	(United States) Kade Ruotolo	def.	(Brazil) Francisco Lo	Submission (rear-naked choke)	1	4:48	ONE Fight Night 21	
1	(United States) Tye Ruotolo	def.	(Australia) Izaak Michell	Submission (rear-naked choke)	1	4:43	ONE Fight Night 21	
2	(Canada) Dante Leon	def.	(Brazil) Bruno Pucci	Submission (triangle armbar)	1	2:01	ONE Fight Night 26	
3	(Brazil) Victória Souza	def.	(Japan) Itsuki Hirata	Technical Submission (guillotine choke)	1	1:31	ONE 167	
4	(Japan) Ayaka Miura	def.	(Argentina) Macarena Aragon	Submission (scarf hold armlock)	1	2:20	ONE 169	
5	(United States) Cole Abate	def.	(Japan) Shinya Aoki	Submission (heel hook)	1	2:25	ONE Fight Night 26	

== Title fights ==
Mixed Martial Arts
#	Weight Class				Method	Round	Time	Event	Notes
1	Strawweight	Joshua Pacio	def.	Jarred Brooks (c)	DQ (illegal slam)	1	0:56	ONE 166	For the ONE Strawweight World Championship.
2	Featherweight	Tang Kai (c)	def.	Thanh Le (ic)	TKO (punches)	3	4:48	ONE 166	For the ONE Featherweight World Championship.
3	Middleweight	Anatoly Malykhin	def.	Reinier de Ridder (c)	TKO (retirement)	3	1:16	ONE 166	For the ONE Middleweight World Championship.
4	Lightweight	Alibeg Rasulov	def.	Ok Rae-yoon	Decision (unanimous)	5	5:00	ONE Fight Night 23	For the interim ONE Lightweight World Championship. Rasulov failed hydration test and was ineligible for the title.
5	Strawweight	Jarred Brooks	def.	Gustavo Balart	Submission (rear-naked choke)	1	4:39	ONE Fight Night 24	For the interim ONE Strawweight World Championship. Balart missed weight (126 lb) and was ineligible for the title.
7	Heavyweight	Oumar Kane	def.	Anatoly Malykhin (c)	Decision (split)	5	5:00	ONE 169	For the ONE Heavyweight World Championship.
8	Lightweight	Christian Lee (c)	vs.	Alibeg Rasulov	No contest (accidental eye poke)	2	4:57	ONE Fight Night 26	For the ONE Lightweight World Championship. Accidental eye poke rendered Rasulov unable to continue

Kickboxing
#	Weight Class				Method	Round	T.Time	Event	Notes
1	Flyweight	Superlek Kiatmuu9 (c)	def.	Takeru Segawa	Decision (unanimous)	5	3:00	ONE 165	For the ONE Flyweight Kickboxing World Championship.
2	Women's Atomweight	Phetjeeja Lukjaoporongtom (ic)	def.	Janet Todd (c)	Decision (unanimous)	5	3:00	ONE Fight Night 20	For the ONE Women's Atomweight Kickboxing World Championship.
3	Featherweight	Superbon Singha Mawynn	def.	Marat Grigorian	Decision (unanimous)	5	3:00	ONE Friday Fights 58	For the interim ONE Featherweight Kickboxing World Championship.
4	Lightweight	Alexis Nicolas	def.	Regian Eersel (c)	Decision (unanimous)	5	3:00	ONE Fight Night 21	For the ONE Lightweight Kickboxing World Championship.
5	Strawweight	Prajanchai P.K.Saenchai	def.	Jonathan Di Bella	Decision (unanimous)	5	3:00	ONE Friday Fights 68	For the vacant ONE Strawweight Kickboxing World Championship.
6	Lightweight	Regian Eersel	def.	Alexis Nicolas (c)	Decision (unanimous)	5	3:00	ONE Fight Night 25	For the ONE Lightweight Kickboxing World Championship.
7	Women's Strawweight	Jackie Buntan	def.	Anissa Meksen	Decision (unanimous)	5	3:00	ONE 169	For the inaugural ONE Women's Strawweight Kickboxing World Championship.

Muay Thai
#	Weight Class				Method	Round	T.Time	Event	Notes
1	Bantamweight	Jonathan Haggerty (c)	def.	Felipe Lobo	TKO (punch)	3	0:45	ONE Fight Night 19	For the ONE Bantamweight Muay Thai World Championship.
2	Women's Atomweight	Allycia Rodrigues (c)	def.	Cristina Morales	Decision (unanimous)	5	3:00	ONE Fight Night 20	For the ONE Women's Atomweight Muay Thai World Championship.
3	Women's Strawweight	Smilla Sundell	def.	Natalia Diachkova	TKO (punches to the body and knees)	2	2:59	ONE Fight Night 22	For the vacant ONE Women's Strawweight Muay Thai World Championship (as Sundell missed weight and was stripped the title, only Diachkova was eligible).
4	Featherweight	Tawanchai P.K.Saenchai (c)	def.	Jo Nattawut	Decision (majority)	5	3:00	ONE 167	For the ONE Featherweight Muay Thai World Championship.
5	Bantamweight	Superlek Kiatmuu9	def.	Jonathan Haggerty (c)	KO (elbow)	1	0:49	ONE 168	For the ONE Bantamweight Muay Thai World Championship.
6	Flyweight	Rodtang Jitmuangnon	def.	Jacob Smith	Decision (unanimous)	5	3:00	ONE 169	For the vacant ONE Flyweight Muay Thai World Championship. Rodtang missed weight (135.5 lb) and was stripped of the title. Only Smith will be eligible to win title.

Submission Grappling
#	Weight Class				Method	Round	T.Time	Event	Notes
1	Lightweight	Kade Ruotolo (c)	def.	Tommy Langaker	Decision (unanimous)	1	10:00	ONE 165	For the ONE Lightweight Submission Grappling World Championship.
2	Welterweight	Tye Ruotolo (c)	def.	Izaak Michell	Submission (rear-naked choke)	1	4:43	ONE Fight Night 21	For the ONE Welterweight Submission Grappling World Championship.
3	Women's Atomweight	Mayssa Bastos	def.	Danielle Kelly (c)	Decision (unanimous)	1	10:00	ONE Fight Night 24	For the ONE Women's Atomweight Submission Grappling World Championship.
4	Women's Atomweight	Mayssa Bastos (c)	def.	Danielle Kelly	Decision (unanimous)	1	10:00	ONE Fight Night 26	For the ONE Women's Atomweight Submission Grappling World Championship.

== 2024 ONE Featherweight Kickboxing World Grand Prix ==
On April 12, 2024, CEO Chatri Sityodtong has told Thai media that ONE Championship intends to hold another Featherweight Grand Prix tournament this year. The two fighters will be participating in the tournament alongside includes Superbon Singha Mawynn and Chingiz Allazov.

== ONE Friday Fights 47 ==
ONE Friday Fights 47: Suakim vs. Balyko
- Promotion: ONE Championship
- Date: January 12, 2024
- Venue: Lumpinee Boxing Stadium
- City: Bangkok, Thailand

Event chronology
ONE Friday Fights 46: Tawanchai vs. Superbon	ONE Friday Fights 47: Suakim vs. Balyko	ONE Fight Night 18: Gasanov Vs. Oh

ONE Friday Fights 47: Suakim vs. Balyko (also known as ONE Lumpinee 47) was a combat sports event produced by ONE Championship that took place on January 12, 2024, at Lumpinee Boxing Stadium in Bangkok, Thailand.

=== Background ===
A 140-pound catchweight muay thai bout between former three-division Lumpinee Stadium world champion Suakim Sor.Jor.Tongprajin and Alexey Balyko served as the event headliner.

=== Bonus awards ===
The following fighters received $10,000 bonuses.

- Performance of the Night: Alexey Balyko, Kompetch Fairtex, Khunsuk Sor.Dechapan, Numpangna EagleMuayThai and Apiwat Sor.Somnuk

=== Results ===
ONE Friday Fights 47 (YouTube / Facebook)
Weight Class				Method	Round	Time	Notes
Catchweight (140 lbs) Muay Thai	(Russia) Alexey Balyko	def.	(Thailand) Suakim Sor.Jor.Tongprajin	KO (left hook)	3	0:22	
Strawweight Muay Thai	(Thailand) Kompetch Fairtex	def.	(France) Daren Rolland	TKO (punches)	3	2:11	
Flyweight Muay Thai	(Thailand) Puengluang Baanramba	def.	(Brazil) Rhuam Felipe Morais Caldas	Decision (unanimous)	3	3:00	
Catchweight (136 lbs) Muay Thai	(Thailand) Dentungtong Singha Mawynn	def.	(Thailand) Petchsirichai Detpetchsrithong	Decision (split)	3	3:00	
Catchweight (113 lbs) Muay Thai	(Thailand) Khunsuk Sor.Dechapan	def.	(Thailand) Nueapetch Kelasport	KO (punch)	1	0:55	
Catchweight (120 lbs) Muay Thai	(Thailand) Kaenlek Sor.Chokmeechai	def.	(Thailand) Superman Or.AudUdon	TKO (knees)	1	2:27	
Bantamweight Muay Thai	(Thailand) Ferrari Fairtex	def.	(Belarus) Antar Kacem	Decision (unanimous)	3	3:00	
Lightweight Kickboxing	(France) Alexis Nicolas	def.	(Russia) Magomed Magomedov	Decision (unanimous)	3	3:00	
Catchweight (140 lbs) Muay Thai	(Thailand) Numpangna EagleMuayThai	def.	(Japan) Sho Ogawa	KO (elbow)	2	1:52	
Catchweight (130 lbs) Muay Thai	(Thailand) Apiwat Sor.Somnuk	def.	(Belarus) Elyes Kacem	KO (punch)	2	1:23	
Flyweight	(Tajikistan) Khalim Nazruloev	def.	(Kyrgyzstan) Ilimbek Akylbek Uulu	TKO (punches)	2	1:59	
Flyweight	(Australia) Coopar Royal	def..	(Uzbekistan) Komronbek Ortikov	Submission (triangle armbar)	3	3:16	

== ONE Friday Fights 48 ==
ONE Friday Fights 48: Kongthoranee vs. Mazoriev
- Promotion: ONE Championship
- Date: January 19, 2024
- Venue: Lumpinee Boxing Stadium
- City: Bangkok, Thailand

Event chronology
ONE Fight Night 18: Gasanov Vs. Oh	ONE Friday Fights 48: Kongthoranee vs. Mazoriev	ONE Friday Fights 49: Nakrob vs. Pettonglor

ONE Friday Fights 48: Kongthoranee vs. Mazoriev (also known as ONE Lumpinee 48) was a combat sports event produced by ONE Championship that took place on January 19, 2024, at Lumpinee Boxing Stadium in Bangkok, Thailand.

=== Background ===
A flyweight muay thai bout between former two-division Rajadamnern Stadium world champion Kongthoranee Sor.Sommai and Sharif Mazoriev served as the event headliner.

=== Bonus awards ===
The following fighters received $10,000 bonuses.

- Performance of the Night: Kongthoranee Sor.Sommai, Sornsueknoi FA Group, Kwanjai KwanjaiMuayThaiGym, Joachim Ouraghi and Majid Karimi

=== Results ===
ONE Friday Fights 48 (YouTube / Facebook)
Weight Class				Method	Round	Time	Notes
Flyweight Muay Thai	(Thailand) Kongthoranee Sor.Sommai	def.	(Russia) Sharif Mazoriev	Decision (unanimous)	3	3:00	
Catchweight (124 lbs) Muay Thai	(Thailand) Aekkalak Sor.Samarngarment	def.	(Thailand) Petchsaensaeb Sor.Jaruwan	Decision (unanimous)	3	3:00	
Catchweight (138 lbs) Muay Thai	(Thailand) Mardsing KhaolakMuayThai	def.	(Thailand) Sibsan Nokkhao KorMor11	Decision (unanimous)	3	3:00	
Catchweight (128 lbs) Muay Thai	(Thailand) Sornsueknoi FA Group	def.	(Thailand) Ngaopayak Adsanpatong	KO (kick to the body)	1	2:32	
Strawweight Muay Thai	(Laos) Songpaendin Chor.Kaewwiset	def.	(Thailand) Yodsingdam Kiatkamthorn	Decision (unanimous)	3	3:00	
Women's Catchweight (120 lbs) Muay Thai	(Thailand) Kwanjai KwanjaiMuayThaiGym	def.	(Thailand) Petchganya Sor.Puangthong	KO (knee to the body)	2	1:40	
Flyweight Muay Thai	(France) Joachim Ouraghi	def.	(Thailand) Gingsanglek Tor.Laksong	KO (left hook to the body)	2	1:49	Gingsanglek missed weight (142.6 lbs).
Catchweight (122 lbs) Muay Thai	(Thailand) Pitchitchai PK.Saenchai	def.	(Iran) Mehrdad Khanzadeh	Decision (unanimous)	3	3:00	
Strawweight Muay Thai	(Iran) Majid Karimi	def.	(Thailand) Teeyai P.K.Saenchai	KO (head kick and elbows)	2	1:47	
Flyweight Muay Thai	(Malaysia) Kabilan Jalivan	def.	(Myanmar) Sulaiman LooksuanMuayThai	Decision (majority)	3	3:00	
Strawweight	(Russia) Kara-Ool Changy	def.	(Philippines) Arsenio Balisacan	TKO (doctor stoppage)	2	5:00	

== ONE Friday Fights 49 ==
ONE Friday Fights 49: Nakrob vs. Pettonglor
- Promotion: ONE Championship
- Date: January 26, 2024
- Venue: Lumpinee Boxing Stadium
- City: Bangkok, Thailand

Event chronology
ONE Friday Fights 48: Kongthoranee vs. Mazoriev	ONE Friday Fights 49: Nakrob vs. Pettonglor	ONE 165: Superlek vs. Takeru

ONE Friday Fights 49: Nakrob vs. Pettonglor (also known as ONE Lumpinee 49) was a combat sports event produced by ONE Championship that took place on January 26, 2024, at Lumpinee Boxing Stadium in Bangkok, Thailand.

=== Background ===
A flyweight muay thai bout between Nakrob Fairtex and Pettonglor Sitluangpeenumfon served as the event headliner.

=== Bonus awards ===
The following fighters received $10,000 bonuses.

- Performance of the Night: Nakrob Fairtex, Abdallah Ondash, Khunponnoi Sor.Sommai, Kaimookkao Wor.Jakrawut, Freddie Haggerty and Ramadan Ondash

=== Results ===
ONE Friday Fights 49 (YouTube / Facebook)
Weight Class				Method	Round	Time	Notes
Flyweight Muay Thai	(Thailand) Nakrob Fairtex	def.	(Thailand) Pettonglor Sitluangpeenumfon	Decision (unanimous)	3	3:00	
Catchweight (127 lbs) Muay Thai	(Thailand) Kongchai Chanaidonmuang	def.	(Spain) Xavier Gonzalez	Decision (unanimous)	3	3:00	
Strawweight Muay Thai	(Lebanon) Abdallah Ondash	def.	(Thailand) Parnpet SorJor.Lekmuangnon	KO (left hook to the body)	1	1:12	
Catchweight (136 lbs) Muay Thai	(Thailand) Khunponnoi Sor.Sommai	def.	(Azerbaijan) Amil Shahmarzade	KO (left straight)	2	1:44	
Atomweight Muay Thai	(Thailand) Yodnumchai Fairtex	def.	(Thailand) Chokdee Maxjandee	KO (right elbow)	2	2:29	
Catchweight (123 lbs) Muay Thai	(Thailand) Kaimookkao Wor.Jakrawut	def.	(Thailand) Sittichai Sor.Dechapan	TKO (three knockdown rule - flying knee)	2	2:09	
Bantamweight Muay Thai	(Thailand) Yod-IQ Or.Pimolsri	def.	(France) Rafi Bohic	Decision (unanimous)	3	3:00	
Strawweight Muay Thai	(England) Freddie Haggerty	def.	(Thailand) Dankalong Sor.Dechapan	KO (punches)	2	0:14	
Bantamweight Muay Thai	(Russia) Abdollah Dayakaev	def.	(Turkey) Şevket Çerkez	KO (punches)	2	1:39	
Catchweight (120 lbs) Muay Thai	(Lebanon) Ramadan Ondash	def.	(Thailand) Yangdam Jitmuangnon	KO (left hook to the body)	1	1:20	Yangdam missed weight (123.6 lbs).
Welterweight	(Finland) Namo Fazil	def.	(South Korea) Yoon Jae-woong	Decision (unanimous)	3	5:00	
Women's Atomweight	(Pakistan) Anita Karim	def.	(Italy) Adriana Fusini	Submission (keylock)	1	2:20	

== ONE Friday Fights 50 ==
ONE Friday Fights 50: Yodphupa vs. Komawut
- Promotion: ONE Championship
- Date: February 2, 2024
- Venue: Lumpinee Boxing Stadium
- City: Bangkok, Thailand

Event chronology
ONE 165: Superlek vs. Takeru	ONE Friday Fights 50: Yodphupa vs. Komawut	ONE Friday Fights 51: Rambolek vs. Şen

ONE Friday Fights 50: Yodphupa vs. Komawut (also known as ONE Lumpinee 50) is a combat sports event produced by ONE Championship that took place on February 2, 2024, at Lumpinee Boxing Stadium in Bangkok, Thailand.

=== Background ===
A 143-pound catchweight muay thai bout between Road to ONE Thailand Season 1 winner Yodphupa Wimanair and Komawut FA Group served as the event headliner..

=== Bonus awards ===
The following fighters received $10,000 bonuses.

- Performance of the Night: Panrit Lukjaomaesaiwaree, Petchsaenchai M.U.Den KhonmaiBaowee, Win Sitjaynim, Ricardo Bravo and Carlo Bumina-ang

=== Results ===
ONE Friday Fights 50 (YouTube / Facebook)
Weight Class				Method	Round	Time	Notes
Catchweight (143 lbs) Muay Thai	(Thailand) Komawut FA.Group	def.	(Thailand) Yodphupa Wimanair	Decision (split)	3	3:00	Yodphupa missed weight (147.2 lbs).
Catchweight (140 lbs) Muay Thai	(Thailand) Panrit Lukjaomaesaiwaree	def.	(Thailand) Kongklai AnnyMuayThai	TKO (punches and elbows)	3	0:55	
Catchweight (134 lbs) Muay Thai	(Thailand) Petchsaenchai M.U.Den KhonmaiBaowee	def.	(Thailand) Petchdam Petchkiatpetch	KO (left hook)	1	2:31	
Strawweight Muay Thai	(Thailand) Chokpreecha P.K.Saenchai	def.	(Thailand) Suesat ManopGym	Decision (unanimous)	3	3:00	
Catchweight (127 lbs) Muay Thai	(Thailand) Win Sitjaynim	def.	(Thailand) Maoklee Chor.Ajalaboon	KO (punches)	2	1:15	
Catchweight (128 lbs) Muay Thai	(Thailand) Laemsing Sor.Dechapan	def.	(Thailand) Mawin Soonkeelahuaytom	Decision (unanimous)	3	3:00	
Catchweight (161 lbs) Muay Thai	(Argentina) Ricardo Bravo	def.	(Azerbaijan) Kenan Bayramov	KO (left hook)	1	0:30	
Bantamweight Muay Thai	(Iran) Parham Gheirati	def.	(Thailand) Peemai Mor.Rattanabandit	Decision (split)	3	3:00	
Women's Atomweight Muay Thai	(Thailand) Chabakaew Sor.Kaenjanchai	def.	(United States) Rebecca Watford	Decision (unanimous)	3	3:00	
Catchweight (132 lbs) Muay Thai	(Thailand) Petchpalangchai Por.Charoenpaet	def.	(Japan) Shogo Kuriaki	Decision (unanimous)	3	3:00	
Bantamweight	(Philippines) Carlo Bumina-ang	def.	(China) Xie Zhipeng	Technical Submission (arm-triangle choke)	1	1:29	
Flyweight	(Uzbekistan) Avazbek Kholmirzaev	def.	(Portugal) Leandro Gomes	Submission (guillotine choke)	1	4:40	

== ONE Friday Fights 51 ==
ONE Friday Fights 51: Rambolek vs. Şen
- Promotion: ONE Championship
- Date: February 9, 2024
- Venue: Lumpinee Boxing Stadium
- City: Bangkok, Thailand

Event chronology
ONE Friday Fights 50: Yodphupa vs. Komawut	ONE Friday Fights 51: Rambolek vs. Şen	ONE Friday Fights 52: Kulabdam vs. Lobo

ONE Friday Fights 51: Rambolek vs. Şen (also known as ONE Lumpinee 51) is a combat sports event produced by ONE Championship that took place on February 9, 2024, at Lumpinee Boxing Stadium in Bangkok, Thailand.

=== Background ===
A bantamweight muay thai bout between former Super Lightweight (140 lbs) Channel 7 Stadium champion Rambolek Chor.Ajalaboon and Soner Şen served as the event headliner.

The headline international bout, Mavlud Tupiev was expected to face Avatar P.K.Saenchai in a bantamweight muay thai bout, but he withdrew due to illness and was replaced by Antar Kacem.

=== Bonus awards ===
The following fighters received $10,000 bonuses.

- Performance of the Night: Wanpadet Looksuan and Avatar P.K.Saenchai

=== Results ===
ONE Friday Fights 51 (YouTube / Facebook)
Weight Class				Method	Round	Time	Notes
Bantamweight Muay Thai	(Thailand) Rambolek Chor.Ajalaboon	def.	(Turkey) Soner Şen	Decision (unanimous)	3	3:00	
Lightweight Muay Thai	(England) George Jarvis	def.	(Iraq) Mustafa Al Tekreeti	Decision (split)	3	3:00	
Catchweight (129 lbs) Muay Thai	(Thailand) Wanpadet Looksuan	def.	(Thailand) Petchphadaen Jitmuangnon	KO (overhand right)	3	2:59	
Catchweight (122 lbs) Muay Thai	(Iran) Peyman Zolfaghari	def.	(Laos) Petchnamkhong Mongkolpetch	Decision (unanimous)	3	3:00	
Catchweight (124 lbs) Muay Thai	(Thailand) Punmongkol Sor.Mongkolkarnchang	def.	(Thailand) Jomjai NaksuGym	Decision (split)	3	3:00	
Women's Atomweight Muay Thai	(Thailand) Junior Fairtex	def.	(United States) Angela Chang	Decision (unanimous)	3	3:00	
Bantamweight Muay Thai	(Thailand) Avatar P.K.Saenchai	def.	(Belarus) Antar Kacem	KO (knee to the body)	3	1:48	
Featherweight Kickboxing	(Morocco) Mohammed Boutasaa	def.	(Russia) Dmitry Changelia	Decision (split)	3	3:00	
Bantamweight MMA	(Kyrgyzstan) Kazakbai Tilenov	def.	(Russia) Ivan Parshikov	TKO (punches)	3	2:07	Tilenov missed weight (147.6 lbs).
Featherweight MMA	(Kyrgyzstan) Adilet Alimbek Uulu	def.	(South Korea) Cho Gyu-jun	Submission (neck crank)	2	3:55	
Catchweight (138 lbs) Kickboxing	(Russia) Temirlan Bekmurzaev	def.	(Japan) Masahito Okuyama	Decision (unanimous)	3	3:00	
Catchweight (138 lbs) Muay Thai	(Japan) Tomoki Sato	def.	(Thailand) Chusuan ChumaroonFarm	Decision (unanimous)	3	3:00	

== ONE Friday Fights 52 ==
ONE Friday Fights 52: Kulabdam vs. Lobo
- Promotion: ONE Championship
- Date: February 16, 2024
- Venue: Lumpinee Boxing Stadium
- City: Bangkok, Thailand

Event chronology
ONE Friday Fights 51: Rambolek vs. Şen	ONE Friday Fights 52: Kulabdam vs. Lobo	ONE Fight Night 19: Haggerty vs. Lobo

ONE Friday Fights 52: Kulabdam vs. Lobo (also known as ONE Lumpinee 52) is a combat sports event produced by ONE Championship that took place on February 16, 2024, at Lumpinee Boxing Stadium in Bangkok, Thailand.

=== Background ===
A 144-pound catchweight muay thai bout between former two-division Lumpinee Stadium world champion Kulabdam Sor.Jor.Piek-U-Thai and former Welterweight (147 lbs) Omnoi Stadium champion Julio Lobo served as the event headliner.

=== Bonus awards ===
The following fighters received $10,000 bonuses.

- Performance of the Night: Kulabdam Sor.Jor.Piek-U-Thai, Chalawan Ngorbangkapi, Petchpattaya SilkMuayThai, Jongangsuek Sor.Thepsutin, Yodtongthai Sor.Sommai, Thant Zin, Soe Lin Oo and Luepong Kaewsamrit

=== Results ===
ONE Friday Fights 52 (YouTube / Facebook)
Weight Class				Method	Round	Time	Notes
Catchweight (144 lbs) Muay Thai	(Thailand) Kulabdam Sor.Jor.Piek-U-Thai	def.	(Brazil) Julio Lobo	TKO (3 knockdowns rule)	1	2:47	
Catchweight (127 lbs) Muay Thai	(Thailand) Thepthaksin Sor.Sornsing	def.	(Thailand) Singdomthong Nokjeanladkrabang	Decision (split)	3	3:00	
Strawweight Muay Thai	(Thailand) Chalawan Ngorbangkapi	def.	(Thailand) Kaoklai Chor.Hapayak	KO (knees and elbow)	3	0:27	
Catchweight (142 lbs) Muay Thai	(Thailand) Samingnum M.Ekachat	def.	(Thailand) Thanungern FA.Group	TKO (right cross)	2	2:47	Samingnum missed weight (146 lbs).
Catchweight (121 lbs) Muay Thai	(Thailand) Petchpattaya SilkMuayThai	def.	(Thailand) Got Taiphetchaburi	KO (overhand right)	2	0:59	
Catchweight (132 lbs) Muay Thai	(Thailand) Jongangsuek Sor.Thepsutin	def.	(Thailand) Payakmekin JomhodMuayThai	TKO (3 knockdowns rule)	2	1:54	
Featherweight Muay Thai	(Russia) Mamuka Usubyan	def.	(Thailand) Shadow Singmawynn	Decision (unanimous)	3	3:00	
Catchweight (130 lbs) Muay Thai	(Thailand) Yodtongthai Sor.Sommai	def..	(Lebanon) Omar El Halabi	TKO (strikes)	2	1:38	
Catchweight (138 lbs) Muay Thai	(Myanmar) Thant Zin	def.	(Thailand) Jaising Sitnayokpunsak	TKO (left hook)	2	0:40	
Bantamweight MMA	(Belarus) Ilyas Eziev	def.	(Kazakhstan) Asset Anarbayev	Decision (unanimous)	3	5:00	
Heavyweight MMA	(Cameroon) Maxwell Djantou Nana	def.	(New Zealand) Adnan Larry	TKO (retirement)	2	5:00	
Bantamweight Muay Thai	(Myanmar) Soe Lin Oo	def.	(Japan) Masayoshi Tsuhashi	TKO (punches)	3	2:40	
Catchweight (126 lbs) Muay Thai	(Thailand) Luepong Kaewsamrit	def.	(Japan) Makuto Sato	TKO (3 knockdowns rule)	1	1:02	

== ONE Friday Fights 53 ==
ONE Friday Fights 53: Phetsukumvit vs. Kongsuk
- Promotion: ONE Championship
- Date: February 23, 2024
- Venue: Lumpinee Boxing Stadium
- City: Bangkok, Thailand

Event chronology
ONE Fight Night 19: Haggerty vs. Lobo	ONE Friday Fights 53: Phetsukumvit vs. Kongsuk	ONE 166: Qatar

ONE Friday Fights 53: Phetsukumvit vs. Kongsuk (also known as ONE Lumpinee 53) is a combat sports event produced by ONE Championship that took place on February 23, 2024, at Lumpinee Boxing Stadium in Bangkok, Thailand.

=== Background ===
A flyweight muay thai bout between former Rajadamnern Stadium Super Featherweight (130 lb) world champion Phetsukumvit Boybangna and former two-division Lumpinee Stadium world champion Kongsuk Fairtex served as the event headliner.

=== Bonus awards ===
The following fighters received $10,000 bonuses.

- Performance of the Night: Kongsuk Fairtex, Sunday Boomdeksian, Mahesuan Ekmuangnon, Huo Xiaolong and Deniz Demirkapu

=== Results ===
ONE Friday Fights 53 (YouTube / Facebook)
Weight Class				Method	Round	Time	Notes
Flyweight Muay Thai	(Thailand) Kongsuk Fairtex	def.	(Thailand) Phetsukumvit Boybangna	Decision (unanimous)	3	3:00	
Catchweight (130 lbs) Muay Thai	(Thailand) Mongkolkaew Sor.Sommai	def.	(Thailand) Denkriangkrai Singha Mawynn	Decision (unanimous)	3	3:00	
Strawweight Muay Thai	(Thailand) Brazil Ekmuangnon	def.	(Thailand) Chalee Singha Mawynn	Decision (unanimous)	3	3:00	
Catchweight (118 lbs) Muay Thai	(Thailand) Sunday Boomdeksian	def.	(Thailand) Phetchainart SitKamnanneng	KO (punches to the body)	2	0:59	Phetchainart missed weight (120.4 lbs).
Strawweight Muay Thai	(Thailand) Payakkiri Misakawan	def.	(Thailand) Ganchai Jitmuangnon	Decision (split)	3	3:00	
Atomweight Muay Thai	(Thailand) Mahesuan Ekmuangnon	def.	(Thailand) Petch Fairtex	TKO (punches)	3	2:30	
Strawweight Kickboxing	(China) Huo Xiaolong	def.	(Iran) Majid Karimi	KO (right hook)	2	2:30	
Catchweight (138 lbs) Muay Thai	(Turkey) Deniz Demirkapu	def.	(Thailand) Buakhiao Por.Paoin	KO (front kick to the body)	1	0:59	
Flyweight Muay Thai	(Thailand) Samingdam Looksuan	def.	(Thailand) Seksan Fairtex	Decision (unanimous)	3	3:00	
Flyweight MMA	(Russia) Chayan Oorzhak	def.	(Afghanistan) Babar Ali	Decision (unanimous)	3	5:00	
Featherweight MMA	(Russia) Nachin Sat	def.	(Azerbaijan) Tural Askarov	Submission (triangle choke)	1	3:51	
Catchweight (138 lbs) Muay Thai	(Thailand) Worapon Sor.Dechapan	def.	(Japan) Hiroki Kasahara	Decision (unanimous)	3	3:00	
Catchweight (122 lbs) Muay Thai	(Thailand) BM Fairtex	def.	(Japan) Masa Bravely	Decision (unanimous)	3	3:00	

== ONE Friday Fights 54 ==
ONE Friday Fights 54: Ortikov vs. Watcharapon
- Promotion: ONE Championship
- Date: March 8, 2024
- Venue: Lumpinee Boxing Stadium
- City: Bangkok, Thailand

Event chronology
ONE 166: Qatar	ONE Friday Fights 54: Ortikov vs. Watcharapon	ONE Fight Night 20: Todd vs. Phetjeeja

ONE Friday Fights 54: Ortikov vs. Watcharapon (also known as ONE Lumpinee 54) is a combat sports event produced by ONE Championship that took place on March 8, 2024, at Lumpinee Boxing Stadium in Bangkok, Thailand.

=== Background ===
A 129-pound catchweight muay thai bout between undefeated (17–0) Aslamjon Ortikov and Watcharapon Singha Mawynn served as the event headliner.

=== Bonus awards ===
The following fighters received $10,000 bonuses.

- Performance of the Night: Yoddoi Kaewsamrit and Petchlampun Muadablampang

=== Results ===
ONE Friday Fights 54 (YouTube / Facebook)
Weight Class				Method	Round	Time	Notes
Catchweight (129 lbs) Muay Thai	(Uzbekistan) Aslamjon Ortikov	def.	(Thailand) Watcharapon Singha Mawynn	Decision (unanimous)	3	3:00	
Catchweight (132 lbs) Muay Thai	(Thailand) Pompetch P.K.Saenchai	def.	(Thailand) Suriyanlek Por.Yenying	Decision (unanimous)	3	3:00	
Catchweight (112 lbs) Muay Thai	(Thailand) Tubtimthong SorJor.Lekmuangnon	def.	(Thailand) Khunsuk Sor.Dechapan	Decision (unanimous)	3	3:00	
Catchweight (112 lbs) Muay Thai	(Thailand) Petchbanrai Singha Mawynn	def.	(Thailand) Petchrit Nokkhao KorMor11	Decision (unanimous)	3	3:00	
Catchweight (118 lbs) Muay Thai	(Thailand) Maisangkum Sor. Yingcharoenkarnchang	def.	(Thailand) Jaoinsee P.K.Saenchai	Decision (unanimous)	3	3:00	
Catchweight (117 lbs) Muay Thai	(Thailand) Yoddoi Kaewsamrit	def.	(Thailand) Nongchamp Luckybantermg	KO (straight left)	1	2:22	
Bantamweight Muay Thai	(Turkey) Ferzan Çiçek	def.	(England) George Mouzakitis	Decision (unanimous)	3	3:00	
Women's Atomweight Muay Thai	(Chile) Francisca Vera	def.	(Australia) Celest Hansen	Decision (split)	3	3:00	
Flyweight MMA	(Kyrgyzstan) Yryskeldi Duisheev	def.	(Pakistan) Ismail Khan	Submission (rear-naked choke)	1	4:30	
Catchweight (128 lbs) Muay Thai	(Thailand) Petchlampun Muadablampang	def.	(Japan) Hiroto Sameshima	KO (straight right)	2	1:39	
Flyweight Muay Thai	(Russia) Rustam Yunusov	def.	(Japan) Ramu Araya	Decision (unanimous)	3	3:00	
Catchweight (143 lbs) Muay Thai	(Thailand) Nonthakit Tor.Morsi	def.	(Japan) Bazooka Koki	Decision (unanimous)	3	3:00	
Strawweight MMA	(Uzbekistan) Sanzhar Zakirov	def.	(Japan) Ryosuke Honda	TKO (punches)	2	3:55	

== ONE Friday Fights 55 ==
ONE Friday Fights 55: Avatar vs. Nabati
- Promotion: ONE Championship
- Date: March 15, 2024
- Venue: Lumpinee Boxing Stadium
- City: Bangkok, Thailand

Event chronology
ONE Fight Night 20: Todd vs. Phetjeeja	ONE Friday Fights 55: Avatar vs. Nabati	ONE Friday Fights 56: Ferrari vs. Tupiev

ONE Friday Fights 55: Avatar vs. Nabati (also known as ONE Lumpinee 55) is a combat sports event produced by ONE Championship that took place on March 15, 2024, at Lumpinee Boxing Stadium in Bangkok, Thailand.

=== Background ===
A bantamweight muay thai bout between Avatar P.K.Saenchai and undefeated (19–0) Kiamran Nabati served as the event headliner.

=== Bonus awards ===
The following fighters received $10,000 bonuses.

- Performance of the Night: Rittidet Sor.Sommai, Bhumjaithai Mor.Tor.1, Chalarmdan Sor.Boonmeerit, Natalia Diachkova and Ryota Koshimizu

=== Results ===
ONE Friday Fights 55 (YouTube / Facebook)
Weight Class				Method	Round	Time	Notes
Bantamweight Muay Thai	(Russia) Kiamran Nabati	def.	(Thailand) Avatar P.K.Saenchai	Decision (unanimous)	3	3:00	
Catchweight (133 lbs) Muay Thai	(Thailand) Rittidet Sor.Sommai	def.	(Thailand) Tomyamkoong Bhumjaithai	KO (left hook)	2	1:25	
Catchweight (123 lbs) Muay Thai	(Thailand) Bhumjaithai Mor.Tor.1	def.	(Thailand) Parnthep V.K.Khaoyai	TKO (punches to the body)	3	0:16	
Flyweight Muay Thai	(Thailand) Denphuthai SitJackMuayThai	def.	(Brazil) Rhuam Felipe Morais Caldas	Decision (unanimous)	3	3:00	
Strawweight Muay Thai	(Thailand) Chalarmdan Sor.Boonmeerit	def.	(Thailand) Singtanawat Nokjeansladkrabang	TKO (punches)	3	1:57	
Catchweight (122 lbs) Muay Thai	(Thailand) Kaichon Sor.Yingcharoenkarnchang	def.	(Thailand) Jompadej Nupranburi	Decision (unanimous)	3	3:00	
Catchweight (127 lbs) Muay Thai	(Scotland) Stephen Irvine	def.	(Thailand) Longern Paesaisee	Decision (unanimous)	3	3:00	
Women's Strawweight Muay Thai	(Russia) Natalia Diachkova	def.	(Netherlands) Chellina Chirino	KO (right hook)	1	1:44	
Lightweight MMA	(Brazil) Matheus Pereira	def.	(Russia) Khasan Khaliev	Submission (guillotine choke)	3	3:57	
Flyweight Kickboxing	(Japan) Taiki Naito	def.	(Kyrgyzstan) Sherzod Kabutov	Decision (unanimous)	3	3:00	Kabutov missed weight (136.4 lbs).
Catchweight (137 lbs) Muay Thai	(Japan) Ryota Koshimizu	def.	(Thailand) Joker Paesaisee	TKO (punches)	3	0:54	
Bantamweight Submission Grappling	(Japan) Shoya Ishiguro	def.	(Japan) Toshiyasu Sagae	Decision (unanimous)	1	10:00	

== ONE Friday Fights 56 ==
ONE Friday Fights 56: Ferrari vs. Tupiev
- Promotion: ONE Championship
- Date: March 22, 2024
- Venue: Lumpinee Boxing Stadium
- City: Bangkok, Thailand

Event chronology
ONE Friday Fights 55: Avatar vs. Nabati	ONE Friday Fights 56: Ferrari vs. Tupiev	ONE Friday Fights 57: Panrit vs. Balyko

ONE Friday Fights 56: Ferrari vs. Tupiev (also known as ONE Lumpinee 56) is a combat sports event produced by ONE Championship that took place on March 22, 2024, at Lumpinee Boxing Stadium in Bangkok, Thailand.

=== Background ===
A bantamweight muay thai bout between Ferrari Fairtex and Mavlud Tupiev served as the event headliner.

=== Bonus awards ===
The following fighters received $10,000 bonuses.

- Performance of the Night: Jelte Blommaert, Tonglampoon FA.Group, Prakaipetchlek EminentAir, Furkan Karabağ, Rak Erawan, Rifdean Masdor, Sonrak Fairtex and Kaenlek Sor.Chokmeechai

=== Results ===
ONE Friday Fights 56 (YouTube / Facebook)
Weight Class				Method	Round	Time	Notes
Bantamweight Muay Thai	(Thailand) Ferrari Fairtex	def.	(Uzbekistan) Mavlud Tupiev	Decision (unanimous)	3	3:00	
Flyweight Muay Thai	(Thailand) Puengluang Baanramba	def.	(Thailand) Dentungthong Singha Mawynn	Decision (unanimous)	3	3:00	
Catchweight (126 lbs) Muay Thai	(Belgium) Jelte Blommaert	def.	(Thailand) Kritpetch P.K.Saenchai	TKO (3 knockdowns - overhand right)	2	1:26	
Catchweight (130 lbs) Muay Thai	(Thailand) Sanpetch Sor.Salacheep	def.	(Thailand) Yodkritsada Sor.Sommai	Decision (unanimous)	3	3:00	
Catchweight (117 lbs) Muay Thai	(Thailand) Tonglampoon FA.Group	def.	(Thailand) Kongsurin SorJor.Lekmuangnon	KO (left hook)	2	1:10	
Catchweight (124 lbs) Muay Thai	(Thailand) Prakaipetchlek EminentAir	def.	(Thailand) Petchniyom FA.Group	KO (straight right)	1	1:52	
Catchweight (152 lbs) Muay Thai	(Turkey) Furkan Karabağ	def.	(Japan) Hiroyuki Ihara	TKO (3 knockdowns - leg kicks)	1	2:14	
Catchweight (116 lbs) Muay Thai	(Thailand) Rak Erawan	def.	(Japan) Shuto Sato	KO (left hook to the body)	2	1:19	
Strawweight MMA	(Russia) Changy Kara-Ool	def.	(China) Sanlang Gexi	TKO (punches)	2	4:25	
Catchweight (112 lbs) Muay Thai	(Malaysia) Rifdean Masdor	def.	(Thailand) Pichai Lukbanmai	TKO (3 knockdowns - left hook to the body)	1	1:18	
Flyweight Muay Thai	(Myanmar) Sonrak Fairtex	def.	(Japan) Masaya Katsuno	KO (straight left)	2	0:16	
Catchweight (118 lbs) Muay Thai	(Thailand) Kaenlek Sor.Chokmeechai	def.	(Japan) Ryuto Oinuma	KO (punches)	1	2:21	

== ONE Friday Fights 57 ==
ONE Friday Fights 57: Panrit vs. Balyko
- Promotion: ONE Championship
- Date: March 29, 2024
- Venue: Lumpinee Boxing Stadium
- City: Bangkok, Thailand

Event chronology
ONE Friday Fights 56: Ferrari vs. Tupiev	ONE Friday Fights 57: Panrit vs. Balyko	ONE Friday Fights 58: Superbon vs. Grigorian 3

ONE Friday Fights 57: Panrit vs. Balyko (also known as ONE Lumpinee 57) is a combat sports event produced by ONE Championship that took place on March 29, 2024, at Lumpinee Boxing Stadium in Bangkok, Thailand.

=== Background ===
A 140-pounds muay thai bout between Panrit Lukjaomaesaiwaree and Alexey Balyko served as the event headliner.

Thant Zin was expected to face Tai SorJor.Piek-U-Thai in a 136 pounds muay thai bout, but the bout was cancelled due to he illness and have symptoms of Appendicitis.

=== Bonus awards ===
The following fighters received $10,000 bonuses.

- Performance of the Night: Sungprab Lukpichit, Parham Gheirati, Moe Htet Aung and Tuan Tran

=== Results ===
ONE Friday Fights 57 (YouTube / Facebook)
Weight Class				Method	Round	Time	Notes
Catchweight (140 lbs) Muay Thai	(Thailand) Panrit Lukjaomaesaiwaree	def.	(Russia) Alexey Balyko	Decision (unanimous)	3	3:00	
Catchweight (140 lbs) Muay Thai	(Uzbekistan) Shakhriyor Jurayev	def.	(Thailand) Numpangna EagleMuayThai	KO (left elbow)	2	0:23	
Catchweight (132 lbs) Muay Thai	(Thailand) DonKing YotharakMuayThai	def.	(Thailand) Chalongsuek JacksonMuayThai	KO (right uppercut)	2	0:54	
Catchweight (126 lbs) Muay Thai	(Laos) Songpandin Chor.Kaewwiset	def.	(Thailand) Wanchuchai Kaewsamrit	Decision (unanimous)	3	3:00	
Catchweight (112 lbs) Muay Thai	(Thailand) Sungprab Lukpichit	def.	(Thailand) Yodnamnuea N&P BoxingGym	KO (right hook)	1	1:06	
Bantamweight Muay Thai	(Myanmar) Soe Lin Oo	def.	(Portugal) Fabio Reis	KO (straight left)	2	1:42	
Bantamweight Muay Thai	(Iran) Parham Gheirati	def.	(Thailand) Otop Or.Kwanmuang	KO (punches)	1	1:02	
Catchweight (140 lbs) Muay Thai	(Myanmar) Moe Htet Aung	def.	(Japan) Tomoya Maruyama	TKO (straight right)	3	2:50	
Catchweight (152 lbs) Muay Thai	(Vietnam) Tuan Tran	def.	(Japan) Yuya Jonishi	TKO (punches)	3	0:56	
Catchweight (163 lbs) MMA	(Japan) Seiya Matsuda	def.	(Russia) Mikhail Gritsanenko	Decision (split)	3	5:00	
Catchweight (163 lbs) MMA	(Japan) Akari Ogata	def.	(Uzbekistan) Khojinsa Komoldinova	TKO (punches)	3	1:16	

== ONE Friday Fights 58 ==
ONE Friday Fights 58: Superbon vs. Grigorian 3
- Promotion: ONE Championship
- Date: April 5, 2024
- Venue: Lumpinee Boxing Stadium
- City: Bangkok, Thailand

Event chronology
ONE Friday Fights 57: Panrit vs. Balyko	ONE Friday Fights 58: Superbon vs. Grigorian 3	ONE Fight Night 21: Eersel vs. Nicolas

ONE Friday Fights 58: Superbon vs. Grigorian 3 (also known as ONE Lumpinee 58) is a combat sports event produced by ONE Championship that took place on April 5, 2024, at Lumpinee Boxing Stadium in Bangkok, Thailand.

=== Background ===
A trilogy bout for the interim ONE Featherweight Kickboxing World Championship between former champion Superbon Singha Mawynn and former Glory Lightweight champion Marat Grigorian headlined the event. The pairing first met at Kunlun Fight 69 on February 4, 2018, where Grigorian won via knockout in the first-round. Their second meeting took place at ONE: X on March 25, 2022, which ended in a unanimous decision in favor of Superbon.

A ONE Strawweight Kickboxing World Championship bout between reigning champion Jonathan Di Bella and reigning ONE Strawweight Muay Thai World champion Prajanchai P.K.Saenchai was expected to serve as co-main event. However, as Di Bella was unable to reach the required hydration levels at the weigh-ins, the fight was cancelled and Di Bella was stripped of his title.

=== Bonus awards ===
The following fighters received $20,000 bonuses.

- Performance of the Night: Shadow Singmawynn

The following fighters received $10,000 bonuses.

- Performance of the Night: Nakrob Fairtex and Muangthai P.K.Saenchai

=== Results ===
ONE Friday Fights 58 (PPV at Watch ONE)
Weight Class				Method	Round	Time	Notes
Featherweight Kickboxing	(Thailand) Superbon Singha Mawynn	def.	(Armenia) Marat Grigorian	Decision (unanimous)	5	3:00	For the interim ONE Featherweight Kickboxing World Championship.
Bantamweight Muay Thai	(Thailand) Nong-O Hama	def.	(Thailand) Kulabdam Sor.Jor.Piek-U-Thai	Decision (unanimous)	3	3:00	
Catchweight (142 lbs) Muay Thai	(Japan) Yutaro Asahi	def.	(Thailand) Saeksan Or. Kwanmuang	Decision (unanimous)	3	3:00	
Flyweight Muay Thai	(Thailand) Nakrob Fairtex	def.	(Thailand) Muangthai P.K.Saenchai	Decision (split)	3	3:00	
Catchweight (134 lbs) Muay Thai	(Thailand) Kongthoranee Sor.Sommai	def.	(Thailand) Jaosuayai Sor.Dechapan	Decision (unanimous)	3	3:00	
Preliminary card (YouTube / Watch ONE)
Featherweight Muay Thai	(Thailand) Shadow Singmawynn	def.	(Sweden) Erik Hehir	TKO (high kicks)	3	0:53	
Catchweight (126 lbs) Muay Thai	(Thailand) Kompetch Fairtex	def.	(Thailand) Kongchai Chanaidonmuang	Decision (unanimous)	3	3:00	
Bantamweight Muay Thai	(Canada) Jake Peacock	def.	(Japan) Kohei Shinjo	Decision (unanimous)	3	3:00	
Strawweight Kickboxing	(China) Zhang Peimian	def.	(Malaysia) Aliff Sor.Dechapan	Decision (unanimous)	3	3:00	
Catchweight (122 lbs) Muay Thai	(Japan) Jurai Ishii	def.	(Japan) Satoshi Katashima	Decision (unanimous)	3	3:00	

== ONE Friday Fights 59 ==
ONE Friday Fights 59: Yamin vs. Ouraghi
- Promotion: ONE Championship
- Date: April 19, 2024
- Venue: Lumpinee Boxing Stadium
- City: Bangkok, Thailand

Event chronology
ONE Fight Night 21: Eersel vs. Nicolas	ONE Friday Fights 59: Yamin vs. Ouraghi	ONE Friday Fights 60: Suriyanlek vs. Rittidet

ONE Friday Fights 59: Yamin vs. Ouraghi (also known as ONE Lumpinee 59) was a combat sports event produced by ONE Championship that took place on April 19, 2024, at Lumpinee Boxing Stadium in Bangkok, Thailand.

=== Background ===
A flyweight muay thai bout between Yamin P.K.Saenchai and Joachim Ouraghi headlined the event.

=== Bonus awards ===
The following fighters received $10,000 bonuses.

- Performance of the Night: Yamin P.K.Saenchai, Pettasuea Seeopal, Yodkitti FiatPathumThani, Takuma Ota and Yuki Kasahara

=== Results ===
ONE Friday Fights 59 (YouTube / Watch ONE)
Weight Class				Method	Round	Time	Notes
Flyweight Muay Thai	(Thailand) Yamin P.K.Saenchai	def.	(France) Joachim Ouraghi	TKO (finger injury)	1	0:36	
Catchweight (130 lbs) Muay Thai	(Thailand) Yodtongthai Sor.Sommai	def.	(Thailand) Petnamngam P.K.Saenchai	Decision (unanimous)	3	3:00	
Catchweight (128 lbs) Muay Thai	(Thailand) Rambong Sor.Therapat	def.	(Thailand) Petchphupa Ekphujeans	Decision (split)	3	3:00	
Catchweight (121 lbs) Muay Thai	(Thailand) Kaimookkao Tor.Rangmart	def.	(Thailand) Petchparuehat Sitnayoktaweeptapong	Decision (unanimous)	3	3:00	
Catchweight (118 lbs) Muay Thai	(Thailand) Pettasuea Seeopal	def.	(Thailand) Prom Yor.Andaman	KO (head kick)	2	2:28	
Strawweight Muay Thai	(Thailand) Yodkitti FiatPathumThani	def.	(Thailand) Luapong Kaewsamrit	KO (punches to the body)	1	0:25	
Catchweight (140 lbs) Muay Thai	(Thailand) Siwakorn P.K.Saenchai	def.	(Uzbekistan) Shakhriyor Jurayev	Decision (unanimous)	3	3:00	
Catchweight (126 lbs) Muay Thai	(Japan) Takuma Ota	def.	(Thailand) Copter Sor.Sommai	KO (punches and elbow)	2	1:27	
Catchweight (132 lbs) Muay Thai	(Japan) Yuki Kasahara	def.	(Thailand) Petchsimok P.K.Saenchai	KO (punches)	2	1:55	
Catchweight (122 lbs) Muay Thai	(Laos) Petchnamkhong Mongkolpetch	def.	(Japan) Ikko Ota	Decision (unanimous)	3	3:00	
Strawweight MMA	(Uzbekistan) Avazbek Kholmirzaev	def.	(Russia) Zaiundin Suleimanov	TKO (spinning back kick and punches)	3	0:16	
Featherweight MMA	(South Korea) Oh Su-hwan	def.	(Japan) Kazumichi Murai	KO (punches)	1	0:28	

== ONE Friday Fights 60 ==
ONE Friday Fights 60: Suriyanlek vs. Rittidet
- Promotion: ONE Championship
- Date: April 26, 2024
- Venue: Lumpinee Boxing Stadium
- City: Bangkok, Thailand

Event chronology
ONE Friday Fights 59: Yamin vs. Ouraghi	ONE Friday Fights 60: Suriyanlek vs. Rittidet	ONE Friday Fights 61: Phetsukumvit vs. Duangsompong

ONE Friday Fights 60: Suriyanlek vs. Rittidet (also known as ONE Lumpinee 60) was a combat sports event produced by ONE Championship that took place on April 26, 2024, at Lumpinee Boxing Stadium in Bangkok, Thailand.

=== Background ===
A 132-pound muay thai bout between Suriyanlek Por.Yenying and Rittidet Sor.Sommai served as the event headliner.

=== Bonus awards ===
The following fighters received $10,000 bonuses.

- Performance of the Night: Suriyanlek Por.Yenying, Rittidet Sor.Sommai, Focus Adsanpatong, Kaoklai Chor.Hapayak, Yodnumchai Fairtex, Detchphupa ChotBangsaen, Suakim SorJor.Tongprachin and Panmongkol CMA.Academy

=== Results ===
ONE Friday Fights 60 (YouTube / Watch ONE)
Weight Class				Method	Round	Time	Notes
Catchweight (132 lbs) Muay Thai	(Thailand) Suriyanlek Por.Yenying	def.	(Thailand) Rittidet Sor.Sommai	Decision (unanimous)	3	3:00	
Catchweight (130 lbs) Muay Thai	(Thailand) Focus Adsanpatong	def.	(Thailand) Comeback TK.Yuttana	KO (left kick to the body)	1	1:32	
Catchweight (136 lbs) Muay Thai	(Thailand) Songfangkhong FA Group	def.	(Thailand) Khunponnoi Sor.Sommai	TKO (referee stoppage)	2	0:59	
Strawweight Muay Thai	(Thailand) Kaoklai Chor.Hapayak	def.	(Thailand) Suwatlek Tded99	KO (strikes)	1	2:45	
Atomweight Muay Thai	(Thailand) Yodnumchai Fairtex	def.	(Thailand) Mahesuan Ekmuangnon	KO (punches)	1	1:21	
Catchweight (113 lbs) Muay Thai	(Thailand) Detchphupa ChotBangsaen	def.	(Thailand) Saengsakda BoyTarchang	KO (left hook)	1	2:09	
Catchweight (140 lbs) Muay Thai	(Thailand) Suakim SorJor.Tongprachin	def.	(Turkey) Deniz Demirkapu	KO (left hook)	2	1:22	
Flyweight MMA	(Japan) Kaito Oda	def.	(Australia) Coopar Royal	Decision (unanimous)	3	5:00	
Catchweight (132 lbs) Muay Thai	(Japan) Eisaku Ogasawara	def.	(Thailand) Sornsueknoi FA Group	Decision (majority)	3	3:00	
Catchweight (130 lbs) Muay Thai	(Thailand) Panmongkol CMA.Academy	def.	(France) Thomas Van Nijnatten	KO (straight right)	1	1:50	
Women's Atomweight Muay Thai	(Thailand) Junior Fairtex	def.	(Japan) Masami Machida	Decision (unanimous)	3	3:00	
Women's Strawweight Submission Grappling	(Estonia) Liisi Vaht	def.	(Japan) Natsuki Takamoto	Submission (armbar)	1	1;38	

== ONE Friday Fights 61 ==
ONE Friday Fights 61: Phetsukumvit vs. Duangsompong
- Promotion: ONE Championship
- Date: May 3, 2024
- Venue: Lumpinee Boxing Stadium
- City: Bangkok, Thailand

Event chronology
ONE Friday Fights 60: Suriyanlek vs. Rittidet	ONE Friday Fights 61: Phetsukumvit vs. Duangsompong	ONE Fight Night 22: Sundell vs. Diachkova

ONE Friday Fights 61: Phetsukumvit vs. Duangsompong (also known as ONE Lumpinee 61) was a combat sports event produced by ONE Championship that took place on May 3, 2024, at Lumpinee Boxing Stadium in Bangkok, Thailand.

=== Background ===
A flyweight muay thai bout between former Rajadamnern Stadium Super Featherweight (130 lb) world champion Phetsukumvit Boybangna and Duangsompong Jitmuangnon served as the event headliner.

=== Bonus awards ===
The following fighters received $10,000 bonuses.

- Performance of the Night: Petchpattaya SilkMuayThai, Petchnakian Phuyaiyunan and Muga Seto

=== Results ===
ONE Friday Fights 61 (YouTube / Watch ONE)
Weight Class				Method	Round	Time	Notes
Flyweight Muay Thai	(Thailand) Duangsompong Jitmuangnon	def.	(Thailand) Phetsukumvit Boybangna	Decision (unanimous)	3	3:00	
Strawweight Muay Thai	(Lebanon) Abdallah Ondash	def.	(Thailand) Suesat ManopGym	Decision (unanimous)	3	3:00	
Strawweight Muay Thai	(Thailand) Samanchai Sor.Sommai	def.	(Thailand) Brazil M-Eakachat	Decision (unanimous)	3	3:00	
Catchweight (122 lbs) Muay Thai	(Thailand) Petchpattaya SilkMuayThai	def.	(Thailand) Chalawan Ngorbangkapi	KO (left hook)	2	1:48	
Flyweight Muay Thai	(Thailand) Petchsaenchai M.U.Den	def.	(Thailand) Ruayjing Sor.Wisetkit	Decision (split)	3	3:00	
Catchweight (132 lbs) Muay Thai	(Thailand) Petchnakian Phuyaiyunan	def.	(Thailand) SingUbon Or.UdUdon	KO (left hook)	2	1:09	
Catchweight (121 lbs) Muay Thai	(Lebanon) Ramadan Ondash	def.	(Thailand) Pitchitchai PK.Saenchai	Decision (unanimous)	3	3:00	
Catchweight (137 lbs) Muay Thai	(Japan) Muga Seto	def.	(Malaysia) Kabilan Jelevan	KO (right hook)	2	1:29	
Women's Atomweight MMA	(Sweden) Hanna Palmquist	def.	(England) Chloe Cooke	Decision (unanimous)	3	5:00	
Catchweight (119 lbs) Muay Thai	(Japan) Haryuki Tanitsu	def.	(Russia) Anton Salchak	Decision (unanimous)	3	3:00	
Catchweight (143 lbs) Muay Thai	(Myanmar) Min Kyaw Za	def.	(Japan) Ryohei Igado	Decision (unanimous)	3	3:00	
Bantamweight MMA	(Belarus) Ilyas Eziyeu	def.	(Japan) Joji Goto	Submission (rear-naked choke)	3	3:01	

== ONE Friday Fights 62 ==
ONE Friday Fights 62: Mongkolkaew vs. ET 2
- Promotion: ONE Championship
- Date: May 10, 2024
- Venue: Lumpinee Boxing Stadium
- City: Bangkok, Thailand

Event chronology
ONE Fight Night 22: Sundell vs. Diachkova	ONE Friday Fights 62: Mongkolkaew vs. ET 2	ONE Friday Fights 63: Yodphupha vs. Şen

ONE Friday Fights 62: Mongkolkaew vs. ET 2 (also known as ONE Lumpinee 62) will be a combat sports event produced by ONE Championship that took place on May 10, 2024, at Lumpinee Boxing Stadium in Bangkok, Thailand.

=== Background ===
A featherweight muay thai bout between the 2022 RWS welterweight winner Shadow Singha Mawynn and former ONE Featherweight Muay Thai World Championship challenger Jimmy Vienot was expected to headline the event. However, Shadow withdrew due to illness and the bout was scrapped.

A 130-pounds catchweight muay thai bout between Mongkolkaew Sor.Sommai and ET Wankhongohm MBK headlined the event.

Furkan Karabağ was expected to face Mavlonbek Kakhkhorov in a featherweight muay thai bout at headline international card, but he pulled out in a last minute due to illness. The headlined of the international card was promoted a 127-pounds catchweight muay thai between Wei Ziqin vs. Riamu Matsumoto instead.

=== Bonus awards ===
The following fighters received $10,000 bonuses.

- Performance of the Night: Chokpreecha P.K.Saenchai, Kongkula Jitmuangon and Yuki Morioka

=== Results ===
ONE Friday Fights 62 (YouTube / Watch ONE)
Weight Class				Method	Round	Time	Notes
Catchweight (130 lbs) Muay Thai	(Thailand) ET Wankhongohm MBK	def.	(Thailand) Mongkolkaew Sor.Sommai	Decision (unanimous)	3	3:00	
Catchweight (127 lbs) Muay Thai	(Spain) Xavier Gonzalez	def.	(Thailand) Win Sitjaynim	Decision (split)	3	3:00	
Strawweight Muay Thai	(Thailand) Chokpreecha P.K.Saenchai	def.	(Thailand) Pongsiri Sujibamigiew	KO (punch)	1	1:44	
Catchweight (138 lbs) Muay Thai	(Thailand) Kongkula Jitmuangon	def.	(Thailand) Mardsing KhaolakMuayThai	KO (left high kick and punches)	1	2:37	
Women's Catchweight (110 lbs) Muay Thai	(Thailand) Nongam Fairtex	def.	(Hong Kong) Tsz Ching Phoebe Lo	Decision (unanimous)	3	3:00	
Women's Atomweight Muay Thai	(Thailand) Luknam Kor.Klomkiew	def.	(Thailand) Chabakaew Sor.Kaenjanchai	Decision (unanimous)	3	3:00	
Catchweight (127 lbs) Muay Thai	(China) Wei Ziqin	def.	(Japan) Riamu Matsumoto	Decision (unanimous)	3	3:00	
Flyweight Kickboxing	(Japan) Haruto Yasumoto	def.	(Russia) Temirlan Bekmurzaev	Decision (unanimous)	3	3:00	Bekmurzaev was deducted fined 10% in round two due to illegal spinning back elbow.
Catchweight (124 lbs) Muay Thai	(Japan) Yuki Morioka	def.	(Iran) Peyman Zolfaghari	KO (straight right)	1	1:57	
Lightweight MMA	(Brazil) Matheus Pereira	def.	(Russia) Evgenii Morozov	TKO (referee stoppage)	2	5:00	
Bantamweight MMA	(Mongolia) Batochir Batsaikhan	def.	(Japan) Fabio Harada	TKO (punches)	1	4:58	

== ONE Friday Fights 63 ==
ONE Friday Fights 63: Yodphupha vs. Şen
- Promotion: ONE Championship
- Date: May 17, 2024
- Venue: Lumpinee Boxing Stadium
- City: Bangkok, Thailand

Event chronology
ONE Friday Fights 62: Mongkolkaew vs. ET 2	ONE Friday Fights 63: Yodphupha vs. Şen	ONE Friday Fights 64: Gheirati vs. Godtfredsen

ONE Friday Fights 63: Yodphupha vs. Şen (also known as ONE Lumpinee 63) was a combat sports event produced by ONE Championship that took place on May 17, 2024, at Lumpinee Boxing Stadium in Bangkok, Thailand.

=== Background ===
A bantamweight muay thai bout between Road to ONE: Thailand Season 1 featherweight winner Yodphupha Wimanair and Soner Şen headlined the event.

=== Bonus awards ===
The following fighters received $10,000 bonuses.

- Performance of the Night: Sanpetch Sor.Salacheep, Patakake SinbiMuayThai, Chartpayak Saksatoon, Gregor Thom and David Cooke

=== Results ===
ONE Friday Fights 63 (YouTube / Watch ONE)
Weight Class				Method	Round	Time	Notes
Bantamweight Muay Thai	(Thailand) Yodphupha Wimanair	def.	(Turkey) Soner Şen	Decision (majority)	3	3:00	
Catchweight (130 lbs) Muay Thai	(Thailand) Sanpetch Sor.Salacheep	def.	(Thailand) NuengUbon Wankhongohm MBK	KO (punches)	2	2:14	
Catchweight (113 lbs) Muay Thai	(Thailand) Chatpichit SorSor.Toipadriew	def.	(Thailand) Sakaengam Jitmuangnon	Decision (unanimous)	3	3:00	
Catchweight (127 lbs) Muay Thai	(Thailand) Pansak Wor.Wantawee	def.	(Thailand) Pornsanae Sor.Phumipat	Decision (unanimous)	3	3:00	
Catchweight (128 lbs) Muay Thai	(Thailand) Patakake SinbiMuayThai	def.	(Thailand) Tuangsap Sor.Salacheep	KO (punch and elbow)	2	1:11	
Catchweight (126 lbs) Muay Thai	(Thailand) Chartpayak Saksatoon	def.	(Thailand) Mowgli Chor.Ajalaboon	KO (punches)	1	2:04	
Catchweight (116 lbs) Muay Thai	(Thailand) Rak Erawan	def.	(Brazil) Nicolas Leite Silva	Decision (unanimous)	3	3:00	Leite Silva missed weight (117.4 lb).
Flyweight Muay Thai	(Myanmar) Sulaiman Looksuan	def.	(Japan) Tomoki Sato	Decision (unanimous)	3	3:00	
Flyweight Muay Thai	(Japan) Ayumu Kimura	def.	(Romania) Silviu Vitez	Decision (unanimous)	3	3:00	
Catchweight (136 lbs) Muay Thai	(Scotland) Gregor Thom	def.	(Japan) Taku Kondo	KO (punch)	1	2:08	
Featherweight MMA	(England) David Cooke	def.	(Japan) Kohei Takegami	TKO (punches)	1	1:27	

== ONE Friday Fights 64 ==
ONE Friday Fights 64: Gheirati vs. Godtfredsen
- Promotion: ONE Championship
- Date: May 24, 2024
- Venue: Lumpinee Boxing Stadium
- City: Bangkok, Thailand

Event chronology
ONE Friday Fights 63: Yodphupha vs. Şen	ONE Friday Fights 64: Gheirati vs. Godtfredsen	ONE Friday Fights 65: Jawsuayai vs. Puengluang

ONE Friday Fights 64: Gheirati vs. Godtfredsen (also known as ONE Lumpinee 64) was a combat sports event produced by ONE Championship that took place on May 24, 2024, at Lumpinee Boxing Stadium in Bangkok, Thailand.

=== Background ===
A bantamweight muay thai bout between Kulabdam Sor.Jor.Piek-U-Thai and Kiamran Nabati was expected to headline the event. However, Kulabdam withdrew due to finger injury and Nabati was rescheduled to rematch against Suablack Tor.Pran49 at ONE Friday Fights 68. As a results, a bantamweight muay thai bout between Parham Gheirati and Jordan Godtfredsen promoted to main event status.

=== Bonus awards ===
The following fighters received $10,000 bonuses.

- Performance of the Night: Parham Gheirati, Petchninmungkorn CaptainKaneBoxing, Teeyai P.K.Saenchai, Johan Estupiñan, Satoshi Katashima and Shoya Ishiguro

=== Results ===
ONE Friday Fights 64 (YouTube / Watch ONE)
Weight Class				Method	Round	Time	Notes
Bantamweight Muay Thai	(Iran) Parham Gheirati	def.	(Australia) Jordan Godtfredsen	KO (front kick)	2	0:40	
Flyweight Muay Thai	(Thailand) Petchmuangsri Wankhongohm MBK	def.	(Thailand) Denphuthai MC SuperlekMuayThai	TKO (finger injury)	1	1:19	
Catchweight (127 lbs) Muay Thai	(Thailand) Petchmorakot Sitnayoktaweeptaphong	def.	(Thailand) Dieselnoi Liamthanawat	Decision (unanimous)	3	3:00	
Catchweight (126 lbs) Muay Thai	(Thailand) Laemsing Sor.Dechaphan	def.	(Thailand) Dabdam Por.Tor.Tor.Thongtawee	Decision (unanimous)	3	3:00	
Catchweight (120 lbs) Muay Thai	(Thailand) Got Taiphetchaburi	def.	(Thailand) Robocop RadGoldGym	Decision (split)	3	3:00	
Atomweight Muay Thai	(Thailand) Petchninmungkorn CaptainKaneBoxing	def.	(Thailand) Akkaradet Guaybangkorlaem	KO (overhand right)	1	1:37	
Catchweight (120 lbs) Muay Thai	(Thailand) Teeyai P.K.Saenchai	def.	(Japan) Shuto Sato	KO (right hook)	1	0:48	
Catchweight (141 lbs) Muay Thai	(Colombia) Johan Estupiñan	def.	(Japan) Kouta Omori	KO (right high kick & straight left)	1	0:27	
Catchweight (134 lbs) Muay Thai	(Thailand) Noppadet Chor.Hapayak	def.	(Thailand) Nawaaek Sor.Sommai	Decision (split)	3	3:00	
Bantamweight MMA	(Turkey) Isfak Seyid	def.	(Brazil) Felipe Negochadle	Decision (unanimous)	3	5:00	
Catchweight (126 lbs) Muay Thai	(Japan) Satoshi Katashima	def.	(China) Jiang Lumin	KO (punch to the body)	2	0:43	
Catchweight (139 lbs) Submission Grappling	(Japan) Shoya Ishiguro	def.	(Brazil) Bruno Azevedo	Submission (heel hook)	1	9:17	

== ONE Friday Fights 65 ==
ONE Friday Fights 65: Jaosuayai vs. Puengluang
- Promotion: ONE Championship
- Date: May 31, 2024
- Venue: Lumpinee Boxing Stadium
- City: Bangkok, Thailand

Event chronology
ONE Friday Fights 64: Gheirati vs. Godtfredsen	ONE Friday Fights 65: Jaosuayai vs. Puengluang	ONE Friday Fights 66: Kongchai vs. Hamidi

ONE Friday Fights 65: Jaosuayai vs. Puengluang (also known as ONE Lumpinee 65) was a combat sports event produced by ONE Championship that took place on May 31, 2024, at Lumpinee Boxing Stadium in Bangkok, Thailand.

=== Background ===
A flyweight muay thai bout between Jaosuayai Mor.Krungthepthonburi and Puengluang Baanramba headlined the event.

Ilyas Musaev was expected to rematch against Yod-IQ Or.Primonsri at a headlined international card, but he withdrew due to injury and the bout was scrapped. Instead, the promotion was promoted a 147-pounds muay thai between Avatar P.K.Saenchai and Abdulla Dayakaev to new main event international card.

=== Bonus awards ===
The following fighters received $10,000 bonuses.

- Performance of the Night: Jaosuayai Mor.Krungthepthonburi, Watcharaphon P.K.Saenchai, Tahaneak Nayokathasala, Samransing Sitchalongsak and Carlo Bumina-ang

=== Results ===
ONE Friday Fights 65 (YouTube / Watch ONE)
Weight Class				Method	Round	Time	Notes
Flyweight Muay Thai	(Thailand) Jaosuayai Mor.Krungthepthonburi	def.	(Thailand) Puengluang Baanramba	KO (left hook)	1	2:11	
Catchweight (130 lbs) Muay Thai	(Thailand) Petchphupa Aekpujeans	def.	(Thailand) Longern Sor.Sommai	Decision (unanimous)	3	3:00	
Catchweight (119 lbs) Muay Thai	(Thailand) Watcharaphon P.K.Saenchai	def.	(Thailand) Petchnumkhum Phundakrataburi	TKO (3 knockdowns)	1	2:04	
Catchweight (119 lbs) Muay Thai	(Thailand) Tahaneak Nayokathasala	def.	(Thailand) Petchnongnoey Nokkhao KorMor11	KO (left straight)	1	2:17	
Catchweight (132 lbs) Muay Thai	(Thailand) ManU Sitjaenim	def.	(Thailand) Jongangsuek Sor.Theppitak	Decision (unanimous)	3	3:00	
Catchweight (128 lbs) Muay Thai	(Thailand) Samransing Sitchalongsak	def.	(Thailand) Jingreedtong Kelasport	KO (right hook)	2	0:28	
Catchweight (147 lbs) Muay Thai	(Russia) Abdulla Dayakaev	def.	(Thailand) Avatar P.K.Saenchai	Decision (majority)	3	3:00	
Featherweight Muay Thai	(Russia) Dmitriy Kireev	def.	(Myanmar) Tun Min Aung	Decision (unanimous)	3	3:00	
Flyweight Muay Thai	(China) Zhang Jinhu	def.	(Japan) Soichiro Arata	Decision (unanimous)	3	3:00	
Bantamweight MMA	(Philippines) Carlo Bumina-ang	def.	(Mongolia) Chayan Oorzhak	Submission (ninja choke)	2	2:39	
Strawweight MMA	(Japan) Ryosuke Honda	def.	(Japan) Ryosuke Noda	Decision (unanimous)	3	5:00	
Catchweight (118 lbs) Muay Thai	(China) Hao Shuai	def.	(Japan) Shiga Masahiro	Decision (unanimous)	3	3:00	

== ONE Friday Fights 66 ==
ONE Friday Fights 66: Kongchai vs. Hamidi
- Promotion: ONE Championship
- Date: June 7, 2024
- Venue: Lumpinee Boxing Stadium
- City: Bangkok, Thailand

Event chronology
ONE Friday Fights 65: Jaosuayai vs. Puengluang	ONE Friday Fights 66: Kongchai vs. Hamidi	ONE 167: Tawanchai vs. Nattawut 2

ONE Friday Fights 66: Kongchai vs. Hamidi (also known as ONE Lumpinee 66) was a combat sports event produced by ONE Championship that took place on June 7, 2024, at Lumpinee Boxing Stadium in Bangkok, Thailand.

=== Background ===
A strawweight muay thai bout between former Rajadamnern Stadium Super Flyweight (115 lb) world champion Kongchai Chanaidonmuang and Akram Hamidi headlined the event.

=== Bonus awards ===
The following fighters received $10,000 bonuses.

- Performance of the Night: Akram Hamidi; Kaotaem Fairtex, Yod-IQ Or.Primonsri and Miao Aoqi

=== Results ===
ONE Friday Fights 66 (YouTube / Watch ONE)
Weight Class				Method	Round	Time	Notes
Strawweight Muay Thai	(France) Akram Hamidi	def.	(Thailand) Kongchai Chanaidonmuang	TKO (punches)	1	1:41	
Catchweight (128 lbs) Muay Thai	(Thailand) Rambong Sor.Therapat	def.	(Laos) Muanglao Kiattongyot	Decision (unanimous)	3	3:00	
Catchweight (127 lbs) Muay Thai	(Thailand) Kaotaem Fairtex	def.	(Thailand) Wanpadej Looksuan	TKO (punch)	2	1:14	
Catchweight (119 lbs) Muay Thai	(Thailand) Attachai Kelasport	def.	(Thailand) Poye Adsanpatong	Decision (unanimous)	3	3:00	
Catchweight (134 lbs) Muay Thai	(Thailand) Petchuanchom Chor.Hapayak	def.	(Thailand) SingUdon Detpetsithong	Decision (split)	3	3:00	
Catchweight (113 lbs) Muay Thai	(Thailand) Rolex Wor.Panyawai	def.	(Thailand) Sitrak Por.Paidaeng	Decision (unanimous)	3	3:00	
Bantamweight Muay Thai	(Thailand) Yod-IQ Or.Pimolsri	def.	(Uzbekistan) Mavlud Tupiev	KO (punches to the body)	1	1:58	Tupiev missed weight (149.8 lb).
Catchweight (157 lbs) Muay Thai	(Thailand) Khunsuek SuperbonTrainingCamp	def.	(Myanmar) Thway Thit Win Hlaing	Decision (unanimous)	3	3:00	
Flyweight Muay Thai	(Thailand) Seksan Fairtex	def.	(Azerbaijan) Amil Shahmarzade	Decision (unanimous)	3	3:00	
Bantamweight Muay Thai	(China) Miao Aoqi	def.	(Japan) Shingo Shibata	TKO (punches)	2	1:21	
Catchweight (161 lbs) MMA	(Russia) Evgenii Antonov	def.	(Austria) Islam Kukaev	TKO (elbows)	1	4:50	
Strawweight MMA	(Russia) Torepchi Dongak	def.	(Japan) Hiroto Masuda	TKO (knees and punches)	1	4:39	

== ONE Friday Fights 67 ==
ONE Friday Fights 67: Nakrob vs. Khalilov
- Promotion: ONE Championship
- Date: June 14, 2024
- Venue: Lumpinee Boxing Stadium
- City: Bangkok, Thailand

Event chronology
ONE 167: Tawanchai vs. Nattawut 2	ONE Friday Fights 67: Nakrob vs. Khalilov	ONE Friday Fights 68: Prajanchai vs. Di Bella

ONE Friday Fights 67: Nakrob vs. Khalilov (also known as ONE Lumpinee 67) was a combat sports event produced by ONE Championship that took place on June 14, 2024, at Lumpinee Boxing Stadium in Bangkok, Thailand.

=== Background ===
A flyweight muay thai bout between Nakrob Fairtex and Tagir Khalilov headlined the event.

=== Bonus awards ===
The following fighters received $10,000 bonuses.

- Performance of the Night: Nakrob Fairtex, Samingdam Looksuan, Tonglampoon FA.Group, Otis Waghorn and Haruyuki Tanitsu

=== Results ===
ONE Friday Fights 67 (YouTube / Watch ONE)
Weight Class				Method	Round	Time	Notes
Flyweight Muay Thai	(Thailand) Nakrob Fairtex	def.	(Russia) Tagir Khalilov	KO (elbow)	2	2:02	
Flyweight Muay Thai	(Thailand) Samingdam Looksuan	def.	(Thailand) Petchseekiew Kor.Kampanart	KO (right hook)	1	2:43	
Catchweight (118 lbs) Muay Thai	(Thailand) Paeyim Sor.Boonmeerit	def.	(Thailand) Petchpawarit Sor.Sommai	Decision (unanimous)	3	3:00	
Strawweight Muay Thai	(Thailand) Copter Sor.Sommai	def.	(Thailand) Kiriluang Chor.Hapayak	Decision (unanimous)	3	3:00	
Strawweight Muay Thai	(Thailand) Kongsurin SorJor.Lekmuangnon	def.	(Brazil) Nicolas Leite Silva	Decision (unanimous)	3	3:00	
Catchweight (118 lbs) Muay Thai	(Thailand) Tonglampoon FA.Group	def.	(Thailand) Prakaipetchlek EminentAir	KO (knee)	2	2:55	
Catchweight (140 lbs) Muay Thai	(England) Otis Waghorn	def.	(Thailand) Kongklai Sor.Sommai	TKO (three knockdowns)	3	1:34	
Catchweight (141 lbs) Muay Thai	(Myanmar) Moe Htet Aung	def.	(Japan) Kazuki Yamagishi	Decision (split)	3	3:00	
Catchweight (116 lbs) Muay Thai	(Japan) Haruyuki Tanitsu	def.	(Vietnam) Nguyen Van Thanh	TKO (punches to the body)	1	2:49	
Flyweight MMA	(Japan) Kaito Oda	def.	(Vietnam) Tran Ngoc Luong	Decision (unanimous)	3	5:00	
Women's Catchweight (117 lbs) Muay Thai	(Japan) Koko Ohara	def.	(Thailand) Saorattana Sitkrujeab	Decision (unanimous)	3	3:00	

== ONE Friday Fights 68 ==
ONE Friday Fights 68: Prajanchai vs. Di Bella
- Promotion: ONE Championship
- Date: June 28, 2024
- Venue: Lumpinee Boxing Stadium
- City: Bangkok, Thailand

Event chronology
ONE Friday Fights 67: Nakrob vs. Khalilov	ONE Friday Fights 68: Prajanchai vs. Di Bella	ONE Friday Fights 69: Kulabdam vs. Anane

ONE Friday Fights 68: Prajanchai vs. Di Bella (also known as ONE Lumpinee 68) was a combat sports event produced by ONE Championship that took place on June 28, 2024, at Lumpinee Boxing Stadium in Bangkok, Thailand.

=== Background ===
A ONE Strawweight Kickboxing World Championship bout for the vacant title between the ONE Strawweight Muay Thai Champion Prajanchai P.K.Saenchai and former champion Jonathan Di Bella headlined the event. The bout was originally scheduled at ONE Friday Fights 58 on April 5, but the bout was cancelled after Di Bella had not passed his hydration tests and was stripped of the title.

=== Bonus awards ===
The following fighters received $10,000 bonuses.

- Performance of the Night: Kiamran Nabati, Pakorn P.K.Saenchai and Suriyanlek Por.Yenying

=== Results ===
ONE Friday Fights 68 (PPV at Watch ONE)
Weight Class				Method	Round	Time	Notes
Strawweight Kickboxing	(Thailand) Prajanchai P.K.Saenchai	def.	(Canada) Jonathan Di Bella	Decision (unanimous)	5	3:00	For the vacant ONE Strawweight Kickboxing World Championship.
Flyweight Muay Thai	(Thailand) Superlek Kiatmuu9	def.	(Thailand) Kongthoranee Sor.Sommai	Decision (unanimous)	3	3:00	
Bantamweight Muay Thai	(Russia) Kiamran Nabati	def.	(Thailand) Suablack Tor.Pran49	KO (left hook)	1	1:59	
Bantamweight Kickboxing	(Thailand) Petchtanong Petchfergus	def.	(Russia) Alaverdi Ramazanov	TKO (foot injury)	2	1:59	
Featherweight Muay Thai	(Thailand) Shadow Singha Mawynn	def.	(France) Jimmy Vienot	Decision (unanimous)	3	3:00	
Bantamweight Muay Thai	(Thailand) Pakorn P.K.Saenchai	def.	(France) Rafi Bohic	KO (right hook)	1	2:15	
Bantamweight Muay Thai	(Australia) Tyson Harrison	def.	(Thailand) Sibmuen Sitchefboontham	Decision (split)	3	3:00	
Preliminary card (YouTube / Watch ONE)
Catchweight (140 lbs) Muay Thai	(Thailand) Yodlekpet Or.Atchariya	def.	(Thailand) Komawut FA.Group	Decision (unanimous)	3	3:00	
Catchweight (132 lbs) Muay Thai	(Thailand) Suriyanlek Por.Yenying	def.	(Thailand) Pompetch P.K.Saenchai	KO (right hook)	1	2:50	
Catchweight (132 lbs) Kickboxing	(Japan) Kaito Sakaguchi	def.	(China) Lan Shanteng	Decision (unanimous)	3	3:00	
Strawweight MMA	(Japan) Kohei Wakabayashi	def.	(China) Sanlang Gexi	Decision (split)	3	5:00	
Catchweight (143 lbs) Muay Thai	(Japan) Ryota Hashimoto	def.	(Japan) Yuto Ueno	KO (right hook)	1	2:05	

== ONE Friday Fights 69 ==
ONE Friday Fights 69: Kulabdam vs. Anane
- Promotion: ONE Championship
- Date: July 5, 2024
- Venue: Lumpinee Boxing Stadium
- City: Bangkok, Thailand

Event chronology
ONE Friday Fights 68: Prajanchai vs. Di Bella	ONE Friday Fights 69: Kulabdam vs. Anane	ONE Fight Night 23: Ok vs. Rasulov

ONE Friday Fights 69: Kulabdam vs. Anane (also known as ONE Lumpinee 69) was a combat sports event produced by ONE Championship that took place on July 5, 2024, at Lumpinee Boxing Stadium in Bangkok, Thailand.

=== Background ===
A bantamweight muay thai bout between Kulabdam Sor.Jor.Piek-U-Thai and Nabil Anane headlined the event.

=== Bonus awards ===
The following fighters received $10,000 bonuses:

- Performance of the Night: Nabil Anane, Maisangkum Sor. Yingcharoenkarnchang, Sunday Boomdeksean, Soe Lin Oo, Ikko Ota, Avazbek Kholmirzaev and Katsuaki Aoyagi

=== Results ===
ONE Friday Fights 69 (YouTube / Watch ONE)
Weight Class				Method	Round	Time	Notes
Bantamweight Muay Thai	(Algeria) Nabil Anane	def.	(Thailand) Kulabdam Sor.Jor.Piek-U-Thai	KO (elbow and knee)	2	2:54	
Catchweight (150 lbs) Muay Thai	(Thailand) Nontachai Jitmuangnon	def.	(Italy) Alessio Malatesta	Decision (unanimous)	3	3:00	
Catchweight (140 lbs) Muay Thai	(Thailand) Buakhiao Por.Paoin	def.	(Thailand) Raksiam Sor.Boonmeerit	Decision (unanimous)	3	3:00	
Catchweight (120 lbs) Muay Thai	(Thailand) Maisangkum Sor. Yingcharoenkarnchang	def.	(Thailand) Petchsaensuk ChotBangsaen	KO (punches to the body)	1	1:53	
Catchweight (118 lbs) Muay Thai	(Thailand) Sunday Boomdeksean	def.	(Thailand) Chusap Sor.Salacheep	TKO (punches)	2	1:01	
Catchweight (120 lbs) Muay Thai	(Thailand) Mungkorn Boomdeksean	def.	(Thailand) Kaenlek Sor.Chokmeechai	Decision (unanimous)	3	3:00	
Bantamweight Muay Thai	(Myanmar) Soe Lin Oo	def.	(Thailand) Pongsiri P.K.Saenchai	KO (punch)	2	0:49	
Bantamweight Kickboxing	(Russia) Elbrus Osmanov	def.	(China) Miao Aoqi	Decision (unanimous)	3	3:00	
Catchweight (122 lbs) Muay Thai	(Japan) Ikko Ota	def.	(Thailand) BM Fairtex	KO (punch)	2	1:48	
Strawweight MMA	(Uzbekistan) Avazbek Kholmirzaev	def.	(Russia) Changy Kara-Ool	Submission (armbar)	1	3:39	
Women's Atomweight Muay Thai	(Australia) Celest Hansen	def.	(Japan) Masami Machida	Decision (unanimous)	3	3:00	
Featherweight MMA	(Japan) Katsuaki Aoyagi	def.	(South Korea) Jung Jun-hee	TKO (punches)	1	4:47	

== ONE Friday Fights 70 ==
ONE Friday Fights 70: Focus vs. Irvine
- Promotion: ONE Championship
- Date: July 12, 2024
- Venue: Lumpinee Boxing Stadium
- City: Bangkok, Thailand

Event chronology
ONE Friday Fights 69: Kulabdam vs. Anane	ONE Friday Fights 70: Focus vs. Irvine	ONE Friday Fights 71: Songchainoi vs. Rak 2

ONE Friday Fights 70: Focus vs. Irvine (also known as ONE Lumpinee 70) was a combat sports event produced by ONE Championship that took place on July 12, 2024, at Lumpinee Boxing Stadium in Bangkok, Thailand.

=== Background ===
A 130-pounds muay thai bout between Focus P.K.Wor.Apinya and Stephen Irvine headlined the event.

=== Bonus awards ===
The following fighters received $10,000 bonuses:

- Performance of the Night: Stephen Irvine, Apidet FiatPathum, Tun Min Aung and Kendu Irving

=== Results ===
ONE Friday Fights 70 (YouTube / Watch ONE)
Weight Class				Method	Round	Time	Notes
Catchweight (130 lbs) Muay Thai	(Scotland) Stephen Irvine	def.	(Thailand) Focus P.K.Wor.Apinya	KO (punch)	1	1:57	Focus missed weight (132.5 lbs).
Catchweight (130 lbs) Muay Thai	(Thailand) Yodtongthai Sor.Sommai	def.	(Thailand) ET Wankhongohm MBK	TKO (knee injury)	1	2:06	
Catchweight (114 lbs) Muay Thai	(Thailand) Yodnumchai Fairtex	def.	(Thailand) Tubtimthong SorJor.Lekmuangnon	Decision (unanimous)	3	3:00	
Catchweight (122 lbs) Muay Thai	(Thailand) Apidet FiatPathum	def.	(Thailand) Boonchu Sor.Boonmeerit	KO (punches)	2	0:21	
Catchweight (119 lbs) Muay Thai	(Thailand) PayakSurin Or.AudUdon	def.	(Thailand) Tahaneak Nayokatasala	Decision (unanimous)	3	3:00	
Catchweight (123 lbs) Muay Thai	(Thailand) Petchphathai Bumrungsit	def.	(Iran) Sirvan Amini	Decision (unanimous)	3	3:00	
Strawweight Muay Thai	(Thailand) Chokpreecha P.K.Saenchai	def.	(Lebanon) Abdallah Ondash	Decision (majority)	3	3:00	
Featherweight Muay Thai	(Myanmar) Tun Min Aung	def.	(Vietnam) Tuấn Quốc Trần	TKO (eye injury)	3	1:01	
Catchweight (130 lbs) Muay Thai	(Thailand) Petnamngam P.K.Saenchai	def.	(Russia) Amir Abdulmuslimov	Decision (unanimous)	3	3:00	
Lightweight MMA	(Russia) Gadzhimurad Amirzhanov	def.	(Brazil) Matheus Pereira	Decision (unanimous)	3	5:00	
Catchweight (143 lbs) Muay Thai	(United States) Kendu Irving	def.	(Japan) Yuhei Tsuda	KO (elbow)	2	1:37	

== ONE Friday Fights 71 ==
ONE Friday Fights 71: Songchainoi vs. Rak 2
- Promotion: ONE Championship
- Date: July 19, 2024
- Venue: Lumpinee Boxing Stadium
- City: Bangkok, Thailand

Event chronology
ONE Friday Fights 70: Focus vs. Irvine	ONE Friday Fights 71: Songchainoi vs. Rak 2	ONE Friday Fights 72: Kongsuk vs. Ouraghi

ONE Friday Fights 71: Songchainoi vs. Rak 2 (also known as ONE Lumpinee 71) was a combat sports event produced by ONE Championship that took place on July 19, 2024, at Lumpinee Boxing Stadium in Bangkok, Thailand.

=== Background ===
A 116-pounds muay thai rematch between Songchainoi Kiatsongrit and Rak Erawan headlined the event.

=== Bonus awards ===
The following fighters received $10,000 bonuses:

- Performance of the Night: Petchlamphun Muadablampang, Chartpayak Saksatoon, Yoddoi Kaewsamrit, Rifdean Masdor, Ilyas Musaev, Abdulla Dayakaev and Asadula Imangazaliev

=== Results ===
ONE Friday Fights 71 (YouTube / Watch ONE)
Weight Class				Method	Round	Time	Notes
Catchweight (116 lbs) Muay Thai	(Thailand) Songchainoi Kiatsongrit	def.	(Thailand) Rak Erawan	Decision (unanimous)	3	3:00	
Catchweight (128 lbs) Muay Thai	(Thailand) Petchlamphun Muadablampang	def.	(Thailand) Silangern LannaWaterside	TKO (punches)	1	1:27	
Catchweight (130 lbs) Muay Thai	(Thailand) Chartpayak Saksatoon	def.	(Thailand) Pornsanae Sor.Phumipat	KO (flying knee and punches)	1	1:08	
Atomweight Muay Thai	(Thailand) Yoddoi Kaewsamrit	def.	(Thailand) Chokdee Maxjandee	KO (punches)	2	1:10	
Catchweight (126 lbs) Muay Thai	(Thailand) Padejsuk Looksuan	def.	(Thailand) Petchtaweesak Sangmorakot	Decision (unanimous)	3	3:00	
Catchweight (113 lbs) Muay Thai	(Malaysia) Rifdean Masdor	def.	(Thailand) Petchaek Sitbigjasskonrakpathum	KO (elbow)	1	2:49	
Catchweight (142 lbs) Muay Thai	(Russia) Ilyas Musaev	def.	(Thailand) Superball Wankhongohm MBK	KO (punches)	2	0:55	
Bantamweight Muay Thai	(Russia) Abdulla Dayakaev	def.	(Thailand) Ongbak Fairtex	KO (punches)	1	2:34	
Catchweight (133 lbs) Muay Thai	(Russia) Asadula Imangazaliev	def.	(Thailand) Petchmuangsri Wankhongohm MBK	KO (spinning back elbow)	1	1:45	
Catchweight (124 lbs) Muay Thai	(Japan) Issei Yonaha	def.	(Kyrgyzstan) Timur Chuikov	Decision (unanimous)	3	3:00	
Featherweight MMA	(Russia) Ivan Bondarchuk	def.	(Russia) Nachyn Sat	Decision (unanimous)	3	5:00	
Women's Strawweight MMA	(Australia) Faine Mesquita	def.	(Japan) Yuka Okutomi	Technical Submission (rear-naked choke)	1	2:15	

== ONE Friday Fights 72 ==
ONE Friday Fights 72: Kongsuk vs. Ouraghi
- Promotion: ONE Championship
- Date: July 26, 2024
- Venue: Lumpinee Boxing Stadium
- City: Bangkok, Thailand

Event chronology
ONE Friday Fights 71: Songchainoi vs. Rak 2	ONE Friday Fights 72: Kongsuk vs. Ouraghi	ONE Friday Fights 73

ONE Friday Fights 72: Kongsuk vs. Ouraghi (also known as ONE Lumpinee 72) was a combat sports event produced by ONE Championship that took place on July 26, 2024, at Lumpinee Boxing Stadium in Bangkok, Thailand.

=== Background ===
A strawweight muay thai bout between Kongsuk Fairtex and Joachim Ouraghi headlined the event.

=== Bonus awards ===
The following fighters received $10,000 bonuses:

- Performance of the Night: Petchnamkhong Mongkolpetch and Freddie Haggerty

=== Results ===
ONE Friday Fights 72 (YouTube / Watch ONE)
Weight Class				Method	Round	Time	Notes
Flyweight Muay Thai	(Thailand) Kongsuk Fairtex	def.	(France) Joachim Ouraghi	Decision (unanimous)	3	3:00	Kongsuk missed weight (135.4 lb).
Catchweight (126 lbs) Muay Thai	(Thailand) Theptaksin Sor.Sornsing	def.	(Belgium) Jelte Blommaert	Decision (unanimous)	3	3:00	
Catchweight (142 lbs) Muay Thai	(Thailand) Pentor SP.Kansart Paeminburi	def.	(Thailand) Thongsiam Lukjaoporongtom	Decision (split)	3	3:00	
Catchweight (122 lbs) Muay Thai	(Laos) Petchnamkhong Mongkolpetch	def.	(Thailand) Lookkwan Sujeebameekiew	KO (punches)	1	2:48	
Catchweight (128 lbs) Muay Thai	(Laos) Muanglao Kiattongyot	def.	(Laos) Songpaendin Chor.Kaewwiset	Decision (unanimous)	3	3:00	
Light Heavyweight Muay Thai	(Russia) Beybulat Isaev	def.	(Australia) Alex Roberts	TKO (leg injury)	1	0:33	
Strawweight Muay Thai	(England) Freddie Haggerty	def.	(Thailand) Kaichon Sor. Yingcharoenkarnchang	KO (punch)	1	2:59	
Catchweight (122 lbs) Muay Thai	(Thailand) Pataknin SinbiMuayThai	def.	(Iran) Majid Karimi	Decision (unanimous)	3	3:00	
Catchweight (128 lbs) Kickboxing	(Azerbaijan) Akif Guluzada	def.	(Japan) Haruto Yasumoto	Decision (unanimous)	3	3:00	
Lightweight MMA	(India) Sumit Bhyan	def.	(England) Will Drewitt	Decision (split)	3	5:00	
Lightweight Submission Grappling	(England) Craig Hutchison	def.	(Thailand) Banpot Lertthaisong	Submission (armbar)	1	1:57	

== ONE Friday Fights 73 ==
ONE Friday Fights 73: Worapon vs. Panrit
- Promotion: ONE Championship
- Date: August 2, 2024
- Venue: Lumpinee Boxing Stadium
- City: Bangkok, Thailand

Event chronology
ONE Friday Fights 72: Kongsuk vs. Ouraghi	ONE Friday Fights 73: Worapon vs. Panrit	ONE Fight Night 24: Brooks vs. Balart

ONE Friday Fights 73: Worapon vs. Panrit (also known as ONE Lumpinee 73) was a combat sports event produced by ONE Championship that took place on August 2, 2024, at Lumpinee Boxing Stadium in Bangkok, Thailand.

=== Background ===
A 142-pounds muay thai bout between Worapon Sor.Dechaphan and Panrit Lookjaomaesaiwaree headlined the event.

=== Bonus awards ===
The following fighters received $10,000 bonuses:

- Performance of the Night: Xavier Gonzalez, Sanpetch Sor.Salacheep, Watcharapon Singha Mawynn, Toyota EagleMuayThai, Petchmai MC.SuperlekMuayThai, Sonrak Fairtex, Alfie Ponting and Fahjarat Sor.Dechapan

=== Results ===
ONE Friday Fights 73 (YouTube / Watch ONE)
Weight Class				Method	Round	Time	Notes
Catchweight (142 lbs) Muay Thai	(Thailand) Panrit Lookjaomaesaiwaree	def.	(Thailand) Worapon Sor.Dechaphan	Decision (unanimous)	3	3:00	
Catchweight (130 lbs) Muay Thai	(Thailand) Sanpetch Sor.Salacheep	def.	(Thailand) Watcharapon Singha Mawynn	Decision (unanimous)	3	3:00	
Catchweight (128 lbs) Muay Thai	(Spain) Xavier Gonzalez	def.	(Thailand) Win Sitjanim	KO (punch)	2	0:28	
Catchweight (131 lbs) Muay Thai	(Thailand) Sornsueknoi F.A.Group	def.	(Thailand) Jencherng Pumpanmuang	Decision (unanimous)	3	3:00	
Atomweight Muay Thai	(Thailand) Toyota EagleMuayThai	def.	(Thailand) Fino Chor.Ketwina	KO (punch)	1	2:59	
Catchweight (112 lbs) Muay Thai	(Thailand) Petchmai MC.SuperlekMuayThai	def.	(Thailand) Sungprab Lookpichit	KO (body kick)	2	2:05	
Lightweight Kickboxing	(England) George Jarvis	def.	(Argentina) Ricardo Bravo	Decision (unanimous)	3	3:00	
Flyweight Muay Thai	(Myanmar) Sonrak Fairtex	def.	(England) Alfie Ponting	Decision (unanimous)	3	3:00	
Bantamweight Kickboxing	(Russia) Ilashev Dostonbek	def.	(Japan) Tasuku Yonekawa	KO (spinning wheel kick and punch)	3	2:19	
Catchweight (119 lbs) Kickboxing	(Thailand) Fahjarat Sor.Dechapan	def.	(Japan) Kuroda Naoya	KO (punch)	3	0:43	
Flyweight MMA	(Russia) Khalim Nazruloev	def.	(Uzbekistan) Zhamoliddin Rakhmonzhonov	Decision (unanimous)	3	5:00	
Lightweight MMA	(Iran) Mohammad Fahmi	def.	(Bulgaria) Antonio Bushev	Decision (unanimous)	3	5:00	

== ONE Friday Fights 74 ==
ONE Friday Fights 74: Yodphupha vs. Gheirati
- Promotion: ONE Championship
- Date: August 9, 2024
- Venue: Lumpinee Boxing Stadium
- City: Bangkok, Thailand

Event chronology
ONE Friday Fights 73: Worapon vs. Panrit	ONE Friday Fights 74: Yodphupha vs. Gheirati	ONE Friday Fights 75: Kongsuk vs. El Halabi

ONE Friday Fights 74: Yodphupha vs. Gheirati (also known as ONE Lumpinee 74) was a combat sports event produced by ONE Championship that took place on August 9, 2024, at Lumpinee Boxing Stadium in Bangkok, Thailand.

=== Background ===
A bantamweight muay thai bout between Road to ONE Thailand Season 1 featherweight winner Yodphupha Petchkiatpetch and Parham Gheirati headlined the event.

=== Bonus awards ===
The following fighters received $10,000 bonuses:

- Performance of the Night: Donking YotharakMuayThai, Sainatee P.K.Saenchai, Kirill Khomutov and Hiroyuki

=== Results ===
ONE Friday Fights 74 (YouTube / Watch ONE)
Weight Class				Method	Round	Time	Notes
Bantamweight Muay Thai	(Iran) Parham Gheirati	def.	(Thailand) Yodphupha Petchkiatpetch	Decision (unanimous)	3	3:00	
Catchweight (128 lbs) Muay Thai	(Thailand) Denkriangkrai Singha Mawynn	def.	(Thailand) Patakake SinbiMuayThai	Decision (unanimous)	3	3:00	
Catchweight (112 lbs) Muay Thai	(Thailand) Chatpichit SorSor.Toipadriew	def.	(Thailand) Khunsuek Sor.Dechapan	Decision (unanimous)	3	3:00	
Strawweight Muay Thai	(Thailand) Singtanawat Nokjeanladkrabang	def.	(Thailand) Kaoklai Chor.Hapayak	Decision (unanimous)	3	3:00	
Catchweight (136 lbs) Muay Thai	(Thailand) Donking YotharakMuayThai	def.	(Thailand) Panpetch Sor.Naruemon	KO (punch)	1	2:27	
Catchweight (112 lbs) Muay Thai	(Thailand) Sainatee P.K.Saenchai	def.	(Thailand) Nuengthoranee Guaybangkorlaem	KO (punches)	1	2:31	
Bantamweight Muay Thai	(Russia) Kirill Khomutov	def.	(Turkey) Ferzan Çiçek	KO (punches)	2	2:50	
Catchweight (137 lbs) Muay Thai	(Russia) Ibragim Abdulmedzhidov	def.	(Thailand) Yamin P.K.Saenchai	KO (punch)	2	1:12	
Catchweight (122 lbs) Muay Thai	(Japan) Hiroyuki	def.	(Thailand) Singsangpa Lookboonmee	KO (punches)	1	1:28	
Catchweight (126 lbs) Muay Thai	(Japan) Banna Hayashi	def.	(Thailand) Saenchai Nayokwittungsong	KO (punch)	1	2:07	
Flyweight MMA	(Russia) Dzhokhar Eskiev	def.	(Kyrgyzstan) Ilimbek Akylbek Uulu	TKO (punches)	1	0:15	Akylbek Uulu missed weight (135.6 lb).
Strawweight MMA	(South Korea) Lee Seung-chul	def.	(Philippines) Moises Lois Ilogon	TKO (punches)	1	2:49	

== ONE Friday Fights 75 ==
ONE Friday Fights 75: Kompetch vs. El Halabi
- Promotion: ONE Championship
- Date: August 16, 2024
- Venue: Lumpinee Boxing Stadium
- City: Bangkok, Thailand

Event chronology
ONE Friday Fights 74: Yodphupha vs. Gheirati	ONE Friday Fights 75: Kompetch vs. El Halabi	ONE Friday Fights 76: Peungluang vs. Samingdam

ONE Friday Fights 75: Kompetch vs. El Halabi (also known as ONE Lumpinee 75) was a combat sports event produced by ONE Championship that took place on August 16, 2024, at Lumpinee Boxing Stadium in Bangkok, Thailand.

=== Background ===
A 127-pounds muay thai bout between Kompetch Fairtex and Omar El Halabi headlined the event.

=== Bonus awards ===
The following fighters received $10,000 bonuses:

- Performance of the Night: Nuapetch Tded99, Petchnakian Phuyaiyunan and Mamuka Usubyan

=== Results ===
ONE Friday Fights 75 (YouTube / Watch ONE)
Weight Class				Method	Round	Time	Notes
Catchweight (127 lbs) Muay Thai	(Thailand) Kompetch Fairtex	def.	(Lebanon) Omar El Halabi	Decision (unanimous)	3	3:00	
Catchweight (141 lbs) Muay Thai	(Thailand) Buakhiao Por.Paoin	def.	(Thailand) Petchgarfield Jitmuangnon	Decision (unanimous)	3	3:00	
Catchweight (128 lbs) Muay Thai	(Thailand) Nuapetch Tded99	def.	(Thailand) Petchphupha Aekpujean	KO (punch)	3	2:31	
Catchweight (127 lbs) Muay Thai	(Thailand) Pansak Wor.Wantawee	def.	(Thailand) Dieselnoi Liamthanawat	Decision (unanimous)	3	3:00	
Catchweight (130 lbs) Muay Thai	(Thailand) Petchnakian Phuyaiyunan	def.	(Thailand) Magnum Sor.Sommai	KO (punches)	2	0:53	
Catchweight (133 lbs) Muay Thai	(Thailand) Payakmekin SitLuangpeeNamfon	def.	(Thailand) Promrob Looksuan	Decision (split)	3	3:00	
Featherweight Muay Thai	(Russia) Mamuka Usubyan	def.	(Thailand) Khunsuek SuperbonTrainingCamp	KO (punch)	2	2:16	
Lightweight Muay Thai	(Russia) Denis Burmatov	def.	(Thailand) Chanajon P.K.Saenchai	Decision (unanimous)	3	3:00	
Catchweight (126 lbs) Muay Thai	(Thailand) Brazil M.Eakchat	def.	(Japan) Takuma Ota	Decision (split)	3	3:00	
Women's Atomweight Muay Thai	(Israel) Shir Cohen	def.	(Chile) Francisca Vera	Decision (unanimous)	3	3:00	
Strawweight MMA	(Brazil) Robson de Oliveira	def.	(Azerbaijan) Rahil Baghirov	Submission (armbar)	2	1:18	
Strawweight MMA	(Russia) Torepchi Dongak	def.	(Japan) Ryosuke Honda	Decision (unanimous)	3	5:00	

== ONE Friday Fights 76 ==
ONE Friday Fights 76: Peungluang vs. Samingdam
- Promotion: ONE Championship
- Date: August 23, 2024
- Venue: Lumpinee Boxing Stadium
- City: Bangkok, Thailand

Event chronology
ONE Friday Fights 75: Kompetch vs. El Halabi	ONE Friday Fights 76: Peungluang vs. Samingdam	ONE Friday Fights 77: Yodlekpet vs. Kongsuk

ONE Friday Fights 76: Peungluang vs. Samingdam (also known as ONE Lumpinee 76) was a combat sports event produced by ONE Championship that took place on August 23, 2024, at Lumpinee Boxing Stadium in Bangkok, Thailand.

=== Background ===
A flyweight muay thai bout between Peungluang Baanrambaa and Samingdam Looksuan headlined the event.

=== Bonus awards ===
The following fighters received $10,000 bonuses:

- Performance of the Night: Thway Lin Htet, Ganchai Jitmuangnon, Petchchakrit T.N.DiamondHome, Masatoshi Hirai and Korpai Sor. Yingcharoenkarnchang

=== Results ===
ONE Friday Fights 76 (YouTube / Watch ONE)
Weight Class				Method	Round	Time	Notes
Flyweight Muay Thai	(Thailand) Peungluang Baanrambaa	def.	(Thailand) Samingdam Looksuan	Decision (unanimous)	3	3:00	
Catchweight (136 lbs) Muay Thai	(Myanmar) Thant Zin	def.	(Thailand) Tai Sor.Jor.Piek-U-Thai	KO (punches)	1	1:14	
Catchweight (126 lbs) Muay Thai	(Thailand) Kaimookkhao Wankhongohm MBK	def.	(Thailand) Petchkaolan Singha Mawynn	Decision (unanimous)	3	3:00	
Catchweight (122 lbs) Muay Thai	(Thailand) MrKaen BangSaenFightClub	def.	(Thailand) Petchpattaya SilkMuayThai	Decision (unanimous)	3	3:00	
Strawweight Muay Thai	(Myanmar) Thway Lin Htet	def.	(Thailand) Ganchai Jitmuangnon	Decision (majority)	3	3:00	
Catchweight (118 lbs) Muay Thai	(Thailand) Petchchakrit T.N.DiamondHome	def.	(Thailand) Petchtasuea Seeopal	KO (punch)	1	2:44	
Flyweight Muay Thai	(Thailand) Duangsompong Jitmuangnon	def.	(France) Joachim Ouraghi	Decision (split)	3	3:00	
Catchweight (140 lbs) Muay Thai	(Myanmar) Eh Mwi	def.	(Japan) Reito Takazono	KO (punch)	2	2:18	
Catchweight (117 lbs) Muay Thai	(Japan) Masatoshi Hirai	def.	(Myanmar) Sa Soe Thiha	KO (body kick)	2	1:24	
Catchweight (133 lbs) Muay Thai	(Thailand) Korpai Sor. Yingcharoenkarnchang	def.	(Myanmar) Sulaiman Looksuan	KO (punch)	2	0:16	
Catchweight (127 lbs) MMA	(Vietnam) Phạm Văn Nam	def.	(Philippines) Estrada Donga-as	TKO (punches)	2	3:53	
Lightweight Submission Grappling	(Japan) Tomoshige Sera	def.	(Russia) Magomed Matiev	Submission (triangle choke)	1	3:06	

== ONE Friday Fights 77 ==
ONE Friday Fights 77: Yodlekpet vs. Kongsuk
- Promotion: ONE Championship
- Date: August 30, 2024
- Venue: Lumpinee Boxing Stadium
- City: Bangkok, Thailand

ONE Friday Fights 77: Yodlekpet vs. Kongsuk (also known as ONE Lumpinee 77) was a combat sports event produced by ONE Championship that took place on August 30, 2024, at Lumpinee Boxing Stadium in Bangkok, Thailand.

=== Background ===
A 137-pounds muay thai bout between Yodlekpet Or.Atchariya and Kongsuk Fairtex headlined the event.

=== Bonus awards ===
The following fighters received $10,000 bonuses:

- Performance of the Night: Rambong Sor.Therapat, Khundet P.K.Saenchai, Teeyai Wankhongohm MBK, Nehramit AnnyMuayThai and Omar Kinteh

=== Results ===
ONE Friday Fights 77 (YouTube / Watch ONE)
Weight Class				Method	Round	Time	Notes
Catchweight (137 lbs) Muay Thai	(Thailand) Kongsuk Fairtex	def.	(Thailand) Yodlekpet Or.Atchariya	Decision (unanimous)	3	3:00	
Catchweight (128 lbs) Muay Thai	(Thailand) Rambong Sor.Therapat	def.	(Thailand) Longern Sor.Sommai	KO (punch)	1	1:56	
Catchweight (123 lbs) Muay Thai	(Thailand) Face Erawan	def.	(Thailand) Tawanchai V.K.Khaoyai	KO (punches to the body)	1	1:46	
Catchweight (132 lbs) Muay Thai	(Thailand) Khundet P.K.Saenchai	def.	(Thailand) ManU Sitjaenim	TKO (punches)	1	0:46	
Catchweight (116 lbs) Muay Thai	(Thailand) Teeyai Wankhongohm MBK	def.	(Thailand) YodUdon B.S.MuayThai	KO (punches)	1	1:39	
Catchweight (114 lbs) Muay Thai	(Thailand) Nehramit AnnyMuayThai	def.	(Thailand) Petmuangthai Sor.Naruemon	KO (punch)	1	2:25	
Catchweight (122 lbs) Muay Thai	(Thailand) Pichitchai P.K.Saenchai	def.	(Laos) Petchnamkhong Mongkolpetch	Decision (split)	3	3:00	
Flyweight Muay Thai	(Switzerland) Omar Kinteh	def.	(Thailand) Petchsaenchai M.U.Den KhonmaiBaowee	KO (punches)	3	2:29	
Catchweight (121 lbs) Muay Thai	(Spain) Imad Salhi	def.	(Japan) Arashi Sakamoto	KO (punch and head kick)	2	1:40	
Catchweight (143 lbs) Muay Thai	(Thailand) Sutin RinnMuayThai	def.	(Myanmar) Super Yay Chan	Decision (split)	3	3:00	
Flyweight Muay Thai	(Italy) Omar Drissi	def.	(Japan) Soichiro Arata	KO (punch)	3	2:16	
Flyweight MMA	(Russia) Valmir Galiev	def.	(Kazakhstan) Bolat Zamanbekov	TKO (flying knee and punches)	2	0:13	

== ONE Friday Fights 78 ==
ONE Friday Fights 78: Pakorn vs. Reis
- Promotion: ONE Championship
- Date: September 6, 2024
- Venue: Lumpinee Boxing Stadium
- City: Bangkok, Thailand

ONE Friday Fights 78: Pakorn vs. Reis (also known as ONE Lumpinee 78) was a combat sports event produced by ONE Championship that took place on September 6, 2024, at Lumpinee Boxing Stadium in Bangkok, Thailand.

=== Background ===
A bantamweight muay thai bout between Pakorn P.K.Saenchai and Fabio Reis headlined the event.

=== Bonus awards ===
The following fighters received $10,000 bonuses:

- Performance of the Night: Fabio Reis, Tonglampoon F.A.Group, Yodkitti FiatPathum, Aslamjon Ortikov and Yota Shigemori

=== Results ===
ONE Friday Fights 78 (YouTube / Watch ONE)
Weight Class				Method	Round	Time	Notes
Bantamweight Muay Thai	(Portugal) Fabio Reis	def.	(Thailand) Pakorn P.K.Saenchai	KO (punch to the body)	2	2:04	
Catchweight (140 lbs) Muay Thai	(Thailand) Komawut F.A.Group	def.	(Thailand) Siwakorn P.K.Saenchai	Decision (split)	3	3:00	
Flyweight Muay Thai	(Thailand) Khunponnoi Sor.Sommai	def.	(Thailand) Tanachart Por.Patcharawat	Decision (unanimous)	3	3:00	
Catchweight (122 lbs) Muay Thai	(Thailand) Tonglampoon F.A.Group	def.	(Thailand) Topgun Kor.Kanluak	TKO (punches and head kick)	2	1:55	
Catchweight (122 lbs) Muay Thai	(Thailand) Yodkitti FiatPathum	def.	(Thailand) Got Taipetburi	KO (punch)	1	2:38	
Catchweight (112 lbs) Muay Thai	(Thailand) Detphupa ChotBangsaen	def.	(Thailand) Rodbenz P.K.Saenchai	Decision (split)	3	3:00	
Catchweight (130 lbs) Muay Thai	(Uzbekistan) Aslamjon Ortikov	def.	(Thailand) Yodtongthai Sor.Sommai	KO (punches)	3	2:15	
Catchweight (140 lbs) Muay Thai	(Japan) Yota Shigemori	def.	(South Korea) Shin Dong-hyun	KO (punch)	2	2:43	
Women's Atomweight Muay Thai	(Sweden) Moa Carlsson	def.	(Hong Kong) Tsz Ching Phoebe Lo	Decision (unanimous)	3	3:00	
Catchweight (119 lbs) Muay Thai	(Belgium) Gianny De Leu	def.	(Japan) Kuroda Naoya	KO (punches)	3	0:27	
Bantamweight MMA	(Russia) Idris Abdurashidov	def.	(Kyrgyzstan) Kazakbai Tilenov	TKO (punches)	2	0:22	
Flyweight MMA	(Philippines) Jean Claude Saclag	def.	(South Korea) Lee Jun-young	KO (punches)	1	1:34	

== ONE Friday Fights 79 ==
ONE Friday Fights 79: Kongchai vs. Abdulmuslimov
- Promotion: ONE Championship
- Date: September 13, 2024
- Venue: Lumpinee Boxing Stadium
- City: Bangkok, Thailand

ONE Friday Fights 79: Kongchai vs. Abdulmuslimov (also known as ONE Lumpinee 79) was a combat sports event produced by ONE Championship that took place on September 13, 2024, at Lumpinee Boxing Stadium in Bangkok, Thailand.

=== Background ===
A 126-pounds muay thai bout between Kongchai Chanaidonmuang and Amir Abdulmuslimov headlined the event.

=== Bonus awards ===
The following fighters received $10,000 bonuses:

- Performance of the Night: Maemmot Sor.Salacheep, Isannuea Tor.Tanjaroen, Asadula Imangazaliev and Dzhabir Dzhabrailov

=== Results ===
ONE Friday Fights 78 (YouTube / Watch ONE)
Weight Class				Method	Round	Time	Notes
Catchweight (126 lbs) Muay Thai	(Thailand) Kongchai Chanaidonmuang	def.	(Russia) Amir Abdulmuslimov	Decision (unanimous)	3	3:00	
Catchweight (128 lbs) Muay Thai	(Thailand) Singdomthong Nokjeanladkrabang	def.	(Thailand) Petlampun Muadablampang	Decision (split)	3	3:00	
Catchweight (123 lbs) Muay Thai	(Thailand) Watcharaphon P.K.Saenchai	def.	(Russia) Danila Vasilikhin	KO (punch)	1	2:27	
Catchweight (126 lbs) Muay Thai	(Thailand) Maemmot Sor.Salacheep	def.	(Thailand) Copter Sor.Sommai	KO (punch)	1	0:31	
Catchweight (130 lbs) Muay Thai	(Thailand) Isannuea Tor.Tanjaroen	def.	(Thailand) Changthong M.U.Den	KO (elbow and punch to the body)	2	2:03	
Women's Atomweight Muay Thai	(Thailand) Nongfahsai TOP P.K.Saenchai	def.	(Thailand) Kanchanasiri Sitnayokwailampam	TKO (doctor stoppage)	2	1:27	Kanchanasiri missed weight (119.4 lb).
Catchweight (143 lbs) Muay Thai	(Turkey) Şoner Şen	def.	(Thailand) Nonthakit Tor.Mosri	KO (punch)	3	1:54	
Flyweight Muay Thai	(Russia) Asadula Imangazaliev	def.	(Uzbekistan) Bobirjon Isroilov	KO (punch)	1	0:34	
Catchweight (138 lbs) Muay Thai	(Japan) Muga Seto	def.	(Brazil) Alber da Silva	KO (punches)	3	1:20	
Lightweight MMA	(Russia) Dzhabir Dzhabrailov	def.	(Brazil) Eduardo Freitas	KO (punches)	1	0:20	
Featherweight MMA	(South Korea) Oh Su-hwan	def.	(Japan) Ken Maezono	Decision (unanimous)	3	5:00	

== ONE Friday Fights 80 ==
ONE Friday Fights 80: Rak vs. Yodnumchai
- Promotion: ONE Championship
- Date: September 20, 2024
- Venue: Lumpinee Boxing Stadium
- City: Bangkok, Thailand

ONE Friday Fights 80: Rak vs. Yodnumchai (also known as ONE Lumpinee 80) was a combat sports event produced by ONE Championship that took place on September 20, 2024, at Lumpinee Boxing Stadium in Bangkok, Thailand.

=== Background ===
A atomweight muay thai bout between Rak Erawan and Yodnumchai Fairtex headlined the event.

=== Bonus awards ===
The following fighters received $10,000 bonuses:

- Performance of the Night: Chartpayak Saksatoon, Teeyai Wankhongohm MBK, Lamnamkhong BS.MuayThai and Petninmungkorn Dr.RatNamkangIceland

=== Results ===
ONE Friday Fights 80 (YouTube / Watch ONE)
Weight Class				Method	Round	Time	Notes
Atomweight Muay Thai	(Thailand) Yodnumchai Fairtex	def.	(Thailand) Rak Erawan	Decision (unanimous)	3	3:00	
Catchweight (127 lbs) Muay Thai	(Thailand) Chartpayak Saksatoon	def.	(Thailand) Petnamngam P.K.Saenchai	KO (punches)	2	0:28	
Atomweight Muay Thai	(Thailand) Teeyai Wankhongohm MBK	def.	(Thailand) Yoddoi Kaewsamrit	KO (punch)	1	1:00	
Catchweight (140 lbs) Muay Thai	(Laos) Lamnamkhong BS.MuayThai	def.	(Thailand) Anurak Wankhongohm MBK	TKO (punches)	1	1:57	
Catchweight (114 lbs) Muay Thai	(Thailand) Petninmungkorn Dr.RatNamkangIceland	def.	(Thailand) Komkrit JPowerRoofPhuket	KO (punches)	2	0:37	
Catchweight (110 lbs) Muay Thai	(Thailand) Chabakaew Sor.KanJanchai	def.	(Thailand) Nongam Fairtex	Decision (split)	3	3:00	
Catchweight (138 lbs) Muay Thai	(Thailand) Kongklai Sor.Sommai	def.	(Turkey) Deniz Demirkapu	KO (punch)	2	1:45	Kongklai missed weight (142.6 lb).
Featherweight Muay Thai	(Uzbekistan) Mavlonbek Kakhkhorov	def.	(Myanmar) Thway Thit Win Hlaing	Decision (unanimous)	3	3:00	
Catchweight (130 lbs) MMA	(Russia) Bektur Zhenishbek Uulu	def.	(Uzbekistan) Avazbek Kholmirzaev	Decision (unanimous)	3	5:00	
Catchweight (117 lbs) Muay Thai	(Hong Kong) Emily Chong	def.	(Japan) Koko Ohara	Decision (unanimous)	3	3:00	
Lightweight MMA	(South Korea) Jang Seon-gyu	def.	(England) David Cooke	Decision (split)	3	5:00	Cooke missed weight (159.4 lb).
Flyweight Submission Grappling	(Japan) Shoya Ishiguro	def.	(Japan) Hiryu Niwa	Decision (unanimous)	1	10:00	

== ONE Friday Fights 81 ==
ONE Friday Fights 81: Superbon vs. Nattawut
- Promotion: ONE Championship
- Date: September 27, 2024
- Venue: Lumpinee Boxing Stadium
- City: Bangkok, Thailand

ONE Friday Fights 81: Superbon vs. Nattawut (also known as ONE Lumpinee 81) was a combat sports event produced by ONE Championship that took place on September 27, 2024, at Lumpinee Boxing Stadium in Bangkok, Thailand.

=== Background ===
A featherweight muay thai bout between former ONE Featherweight Kickboxing World Champion (also a current interim champion) Superbon Singha Mawynn and Jo Nattawut headlined the event.

In the co-main event was expected a flyweight kickboxing bout between former three-divisions K-1 World Champion Takeru Segawa and Black Panther VenumMuayThai. However, Black Panther withdrew due to injury and was replaced by Thant Zin.

=== Bonus awards ===
The following fighters received bonuses:

- Performance of the Night ($50,000): Superbon Singha Mawynn
- Performance of the Night ($10,000): Kulabdam Sor.Jor.Piek-U-Thai and Sam-A Gaiyanghadao

=== Results ===
ONE Friday Fights 81 (PPV at Watch ONE)
Weight Class				Method	Round	Time	Notes
Featherweight Muay Thai	(Thailand) Superbon Singha Mawynn	def.	(Thailand) Jo Nattawut	KO (elbow)	1	1:43	
Bantamweight Muay Thai	(Russia) Kiamran Nabati	def.	(Thailand) Nong-O Hama	Decision (unanimous)	3	3:00	
Bantamweight Muay Thai	(Algeria) Nabil Anane	def.	(Myanmar) Soe Lin Oo	Decision (unanimous)	3	3:00	
Bantamweight Muay Thai	(Thailand) Kulabdam Sor.Jor.Piek-U-Thai	def.	(Thailand) Suablack Tor.Pran49	KO (punch)	3	0:57	
Strawweight Muay Thai	(Thailand) Sam-A Gaiyanghadao	def.	(Algeria) Akram Hamidi	KO (punch)	1	1:22	
Featherweight Muay Thai	(Thailand) Shadow Singha Mawynn	def.	(Iran) Mohammad Siasarani	Decision (unanimous)	3	3:00	
Preliminary card (YouTube / Watch ONE)
Catchweight (140 lbs) Muay Thai	(Thailand) Suakim Sor.Jor.Tongprajin	def.	(England) Otis Waghorn	Decision (majority)	3	3:00	
Catchweight (133 lbs) Muay Thai	(Thailand) Jaosuayai Mor.Krungthepthonburi	def.	(Thailand) Suriyanlek Por.Yenying	Decision (unanimous)	3	3:00	
Flyweight Kickboxing	(Japan) Takeru Segawa	def.	(Myanmar) Thant Zin	KO (knee and punches)	2	2:47	
Bantamweight Kickboxing	(Netherlands) Ilias Ennahachi	def.	(Japan) Hiroki Akimoto	Decision (unanimous)	3	3:00	
Catchweight (132 lbs) Muay Thai	(Thailand) Rittidet Sor.Sommai	def.	(Japan) Eisaku Ogasawara	Decision (unanimous)	3	3:00	
Flyweight Kickboxing	(Japan) Hyu Iwata	def.	(Algeria) Youcef Esaad	Decision (unanimous)	3	3:00	

== ONE Friday Fights 82 ==
ONE Friday Fights 82: Yod-IQ vs. Dayakaev
- Promotion: ONE Championship
- Date: October 4, 2024
- Venue: Lumpinee Boxing Stadium
- City: Bangkok, Thailand

ONE Friday Fights 82: Yod-IQ vs. Dayakaev (also known as ONE Lumpinee 82) was a combat sports event produced by ONE Championship that took place on October 4, 2024, at Lumpinee Boxing Stadium in Bangkok, Thailand.

=== Background ===
A bantamweight muay thai bout between Yod-IQ Or.Pimolsri and Abdulla Dayakaev headlined the event.

=== Bonus awards ===
The following fighters received $10,000 bonuses:

- Performance of the Night: Denkriangkrai Singha Mawynn, Alessio Malatesta and Lucas Gabriel

=== Results ===
ONE Friday Fights 82 (YouTube / Watch ONE)
Weight Class				Method	Round	Time	Notes
Bantamweight Muay Thai	(Thailand) Yod-IQ Or.Pimolsri	def.	(Russia) Abdulla Dayakaev	Decision (unanimous)	3	3:00	
Catchweight (130 lbs) Muay Thai	(Thailand) Denkriangkrai Singha Mawynn	def.	(Thailand) Sanpet Sor.Salacheep	KO (punch)	1	0:51	
Flyweight Muay Thai	(Thailand) Donking YotharakMuayThai	def.	(Thailand) Seksan Fairtex	Decision (unanimous)	3	3:00	
Catchweight (122 lbs) Muay Thai	(Thailand) Pataknin SinbiMuayThai	def.	(Thailand) Teeyai P.K.Saenchai	Decision (unanimous)	3	3:00	
Catchweight (119 lbs) Muay Thai	(Thailand) Paeyim Sor.Boonmeerit	def.	(Thailand) Apidet FiatPathum	Decision (split)	3	3:00	
Catchweight (147 lbs) Muay Thai	(Thailand) Chama SuperbonTrainingCamp	def.	(Uzbekistan) Uzair Ismoiljonov	Decision (unanimous)	3	3:00	
Catchweight (150 lbs) Muay Thai	(Italy) Alessio Malatesta	def.	(Laos) Wilachon P.K.Saenchai	TKO (punches)	1	2:19	
Lightweight Muay Thai	(Russia) Eduard Saik	def.	(Jordan) Odai Abozraiq	TKO (punch)	1	1:27	
Catchweight (122 lbs) Muay Thai	(Thailand) Prakaypetlek Eminentair	def.	(Japan) Hiroyuki	Decision (unanimous)	3	3:00	
Women's Strawweight Kickboxing	(Austria) Stella Hemetsberger	def.	(Netherlands) Chellina Chirino	Decision (unanimous)	3	3:00	
Lightweight MMA	(Brazil) Lucas Gabriel	def.	(Russia) Gadzhimurad Amirzhanov	Submission (arm-triangle choke)	3	3:54	
Catchweight (122 lbs) Kickboxing	(Japan) Rui Kakizaki	def.	(China) Lu Yifu	Decision (unanimous)	3	3:00	

== ONE Friday Fights 83 ==
ONE Friday Fights 83: Panrit vs. Superball
- Promotion: ONE Championship
- Date: October 18, 2024
- Venue: Lumpinee Boxing Stadium
- City: Bangkok, Thailand

ONE Friday Fights 83: Panrit vs. Superball (also known as ONE Lumpinee 83) was a combat sports event produced by ONE Championship that took place on October 18, 2024, at Lumpinee Boxing Stadium in Bangkok, Thailand.

=== Background ===
A 139-pounds muay thai bout between Panrit Lukjaomaesaiwaree and Superball Wankhongohm MBK headlined the event.

=== Bonus awards ===
The following fighters received $10,000 bonuses:

- Performance of the Night: Panrit Lukjaomaesaiwaree, Mungkorn Boomdeksean and Hern N.F.Looksuan

=== Results ===
ONE Friday Fights 83 (YouTube / Watch ONE)
Weight Class				Method	Round	Time	Notes
Catchweight (139 lbs) Muay Thai	(Thailand) Panrit Lukjaomaesaiwaree	def.	(Thailand) Superball Wankhongohm MBK	KO (punch)	2	0:57	
Catchweight (138 lbs) Muay Thai	(Thailand) Buakhiao Por.Paoin	def.	(Thailand) Petwichit Singha Mawynn	Decision (split)	3	3:00	
Catchweight (140 lbs) Muay Thai	(Thailand) Petseenin Wankhongohm MBK	def.	(Thailand) Songfangkhong FA.Group	Decision (unanimous)	3	3:00	
Catchweight (121 lbs) Muay Thai	(Thailand) Mungkorn Boomdeksean	def.	(Thailand) Poye Adsanpatong	KO (elbows)	1	1:24	
Catchweight (116 lbs) Muay Thai	(Thailand) Thailandlek Sor.Rungsak	def.	(Thailand) Burengnon Lukjaoporongtom	Decision (unanimous)	3	3:00	
Atomweight Muay Thai	(Thailand) Hern N.F.Looksuan	def.	(Thailand) Petthongkao Patcharagym	KO (punches)	2	2:39	
Flyweight Muay Thai	(Thailand) Panpayak Jitmuangnon	def.	(Romania) Silviu Vitez	Decision (unanimous)	3	3:00	
Catchweight (142 lbs) Muay Thai	(Belarus) Antar Kacem	def.	(Thailand) Worapon Sor.Dechapan	Decision (split)	3	3:00	
Strawweight Muay Thai	(Spain) Mikel Fernández	def.	(Thailand) Rungnarai Kiatmuu9	DQ (illegal soccer kick)	1	2:40	An illegal soccer kick to a downed Fernández being knocked unconscious.
Catchweight (128 lbs) Muay Thai	(Thailand) Wanpadej N.F.Looksuan	def.	(China) Tang Qiqin	Decision (unanimous)	3	3:00	
Bantamweight MMA	(Japan) Katsuaki Aoyagi	def.	(South Korea) Lee Jun-hwan	TKO (punches)	1	2:15	
Women's Strawweight MMA	(Japan) Norika Ryu	def.	(Philippines) Mariane Mariano	Decision (unanimous)	3	5:00	

== ONE Friday Fights 84 ==
ONE Friday Fights 84: Kongsuk vs. Muangthai
- Promotion: ONE Championship
- Date: October 25, 2024
- Venue: Lumpinee Boxing Stadium
- City: Bangkok, Thailand

ONE Friday Fights 84: Kongsuk vs. Muangthai (also known as ONE Lumpinee 84) was a combat sports event produced by ONE Championship that took place on October 25, 2024, at Lumpinee Boxing Stadium in Bangkok, Thailand.

=== Background ===
The event was headlined by a 137-pounds muay thai bout between Kongsuk Fairtex and Muangthai P.K.Saenchai.

=== Bonus awards ===
The following fighters received $10,000 bonuses:

- Performance of the Night: Muangthai P.K.Saenchai, Banluelok Sitwatcharachai, Kochasit Tasaeyasat and Parham Gheirati

=== Results ===
ONE Friday Fights 84 (YouTube / Watch ONE)
Weight Class				Method	Round	Time	Notes
Catchweight (137 lbs) Muay Thai	(Thailand) Muangthai P.K.Saenchai	def.	(Thailand) Kongsuk Fairtex	KO (punch)	3	0:14	
Catchweight (129 lbs) Muay Thai	(Thailand) Palangboon Wor.Santai	def.	(Spain) Xavier Gonzalez	Decision (split)	3	3:00	
Catchweight (118 lbs) Muay Thai	(Thailand) Petsaenkom Sor.Sommai	def.	(Thailand) Sunday Boomdeksean	Decision (majority)	3	3:00	
Catchweight (112 lbs) Muay Thai	(Thailand) Banluelok Sitwatcharachai	def.	(Thailand) Tubtimthong Sor.Jor.Lekmuangnon	KO (punches)	3	0:45	
Catchweight (120 lbs) Muay Thai	(Thailand) Singdam Kafefocus	def.	(Ukraine) Andrii Mezentsev	Decision (unanimous)	3	3:00	
Catchweight (112 lbs) Muay Thai	(Thailand) Kochasit Tasaeyasat	def.	(Thailand) Detpichai NaweeAndaman	KO (punches)	1	1:41	
Bantamweight Muay Thai	(Iran) Parham Gheirati	def.	(England) George Mouzakitis	KO (elbow and punches)	3	2:31	
Flyweight Muay Thai	(Switzerland) Omar Kinteh	def.	(Myanmar) Eh Mwi	Decision (unanimous)	3	3:00	
Catchweight (134 lbs) Muay Thai	(Myanmar) Sonrak Fairtex	def.	(Japan) Yuki Kasahara	Decision (unanimous)	3	3:00	
Catchweight (123 lbs) Muay Thai	(Thailand) Yangdam Jitmuangnon	def.	(Laos) Kongpoxay LaoLaneXang	Decision (unanimous)	3	3:00	
Strawweight MMA	(Philippines) Marwin Quirante	def.	(Vietnam) Phan Thanh Tùng	TKO (retirement)	1	5:00	
Lightweight Submission Grappling	(China) Yi Yuan	def.	(Japan) Tomoshige Sera	Decision (split)	1	10:00	

== ONE Friday Fights 85 ==
ONE Friday Fights 85: Yodlekpet vs. Puengluang
- Promotion: ONE Championship
- Date: November 1, 2024
- Venue: Lumpinee Boxing Stadium
- City: Bangkok, Thailand

ONE Friday Fights 85: Yodlekpet vs. Puengluang (also known as ONE Lumpinee 85) was a combat sports event produced by ONE Championship that took place on November 1, 2024, at Lumpinee Boxing Stadium in Bangkok, Thailand.

=== Background ===
A flyweight muay thai bout between Yodlekpet Or.Atchariya and Puengluang Baanrambaa headlined the event.

=== Bonus awards ===
The following fighters received $10,000 bonuses:

- Performance of the Night: Yodlekpet Or.Atchariya, Akif Guluzada, Toyota EagleMuayThai, Detchanan Wor.Wiangsa, Lekkla BS.MuayThai and George Jarvis

=== Results ===
ONE Friday Fights 85 (YouTube / Watch ONE)
Weight Class				Method	Round	Time	Notes
Flyweight Muay Thai	(Thailand) Yodlekpet Or.Atchariya	def.	(Thailand) Puengluang Baanrambaa	KO (punch)	3	0:52	
Flyweight Muay Thai	(Azerbaijan) Akif Guluzada	def.	(Thailand) Samingdam N.F.Looksuan	TKO (knee and punches)	1	2:41	
Strawweight Muay Thai	(Thailand) Brazil M.Eakchat	def.	(Myanmar) Thway Lin Htet	Decision (unanimous)	3	3:00	
Catchweight (132 lbs) Muay Thai	(Thailand) Pethuahin Jitmuangnon	def.	(Thailand) Petsimok P.K.Saenchai	Decision (unanimous)	3	3:00	
Atomweight Muay Thai	(Thailand) Toyota EagleMuayThai	def.	(Thailand) Detchanan Wor.Wiangsa	KO (punch to the body)	3	1:37	
Catchweight (127 lbs) Muay Thai	(Thailand) Lekkla BS.Muaythai	def.	(Thailand) Sueakao Sor.Naruemon	KO (punches)	2	1:47	
Lightweight Muay Thai	(England) George Jarvis	def.	(Thailand) Rungrawee Sitsongpeenong	KO (elbow and punches)	3	1:15	
Catchweight (126 lbs) Muay Thai	(Japan) Takuma Ota	def.	(China) Wei Ziqin	Decision (unanimous)	3	3:00	
Women's Atomweight Muay Thai	(Thailand) Junior Fairtex	def.	(Argentina) Florencia Greco	Decision (unanimous)	3	3:00	Greco missed weight (116.4 lb).
Strawweight MMA	(Brazil) Robson de Oliveira	def.	(Philippines) Jayson Miralpez	Decision (unanimous)	3	5:00	
Featherweight MMA	(Russia) Ivan Bondarchuk	def.	(Azerbaijan) Suleyman Suleymanov	Decision (unanimous)	3	5:00	
Flyweight Muay Thai	(Japan) Tomoki Sato	def.	(Italy) Omar Drissi	KO (punches)	2	1:05	

== ONE Friday Fights 86 ==
ONE Friday Fights 86: Kompetch vs. Chartpayak
- Promotion: ONE Championship
- Date: November 8, 2024
- Venue: Lumpinee Boxing Stadium
- City: Bangkok, Thailand

ONE Friday Fights 86: Kompetch vs. Chartpayak (also known as ONE Lumpinee 86) was a combat sports event produced by ONE Championship that took place on November 8, 2024, at Lumpinee Boxing Stadium in Bangkok, Thailand.

=== Background ===
The event was headlined by a 126-pounds muay thai bout between Kompetch Fairtex and Chartpayak Saksatoon.

=== Bonus awards ===
The following fighters received bonuses:

- Performance of the Night ($20,000): Chatpichit Sor.Sor.Toipadriew
- Performance of the Night ($10,000): Egor Bikrev, Mahesuan Aekmuangnon and Nonthachai Jitmuangnon

=== Results ===
ONE Friday Fights 86 (YouTube / Watch ONE)
Weight Class				Method	Round	Time	Notes
Catchweight (126 lbs) Muay Thai	(Thailand) Chartpayak Saksatoon	def.	(Thailand) Kompetch Fairtex	Decision (majority)	3	3:00	
Catchweight (128 lbs) Muay Thai	(Thailand) Petlamphun Muadablampang	def.	(Thailand) Nuapet Tded99	Decision (unanimous)	3	3:00	
Flyweight Muay Thai	(Russia) Egor Bikrev	def.	(Thailand) Gingsanglek Tor.Laksong	TKO (punch)	1	1:45	
Catchweight (134 lbs) Muay Thai	(Thailand) Yodseksan Rodsuayjajed	def.	(Thailand) Jaipet Soonkelatasao	Decision (split)	3	3:00	
Catchweight (113 lbs) Muay Thai	(Thailand) Chatpichit Sor.Sor.Toipadriew	def.	(Thailand) Nueaphet Kelasport	KO (punches)	3	1:42	
Atomweight Muay Thai	(Thailand) Mahesuan Aekmuangnon	def.	(Thailand) Panlam Sor.Sommai	TKO (punch)	1	2:36	
Catchweight (150 lbs) Muay Thai	(Thailand) Nonthachai Jitmuangnon	def.	(Russia) Dimitrii Kovtun	KO (knee to the body and punch)	2	2:39	
Strawweight Kickboxing	(Japan) Koki Osaki	def.	(China) Huo Xiaolong	Decision (unanimous)	3	3:00	
Catchweight (100 lbs) Muay Thai	(Philippines) Islay Erika Bomogao	def.	(Japan) Fuu Sakata	Decision (unanimous)	3	3:00	
Women's Atomweight Muay Thai	(Sweden) Moa Carlsson	def.	(Australia) Celest Hansen	Decision (unanimous)	3	3:00	
Featherweight MMA	(Philippines) Carlos Neyheban Alvarez	def.	(Turkey) Mirza Aliev	TKO (punches)	2	4:22	
Flyweight MMA	(Philippines) Fritz Biagtan	def.	(Iran) Sayedali Asli	Decision (unanimous)	3	5:00	

== ONE Friday Fights 87 ==
ONE Friday Fights 87: Kongchai vs. Chokpreecha
- Promotion: ONE Championship
- Date: November 15, 2024
- Venue: Lumpinee Boxing Stadium
- City: Bangkok, Thailand

ONE Friday Fights 87: Kongchai vs. Chokpreecha (also known as ONE Lumpinee 87) was a combat sports event produced by ONE Championship that took place on November 15, 2024, at Lumpinee Boxing Stadium in Bangkok, Thailand.

=== Background ===
A strawweight muay thai bout between Kongchai Chanaidonmuang and Chokpreecha P.K.Saenchai headlined the event.

Asadula Imangazaliev was expected to face Road to ONE: Thailand Season 1 flyweight winner Dedduanglek Wankhongohm MBK at this event, but the bout was cancelled due to Imangazaliev illness.

=== Bonus awards ===
The following fighters received $10,000 bonuses:

- Performance of the Night: Kongchai Chanaidonmuang, Chokpreecha P.K.Saenchai, Singdomthong Nokjeanladkrabang, Payaksurin Sit.JP and Marwin Dittrich

=== Results ===
ONE Friday Fights 87 (YouTube / Watch ONE)
Weight Class				Method	Round	Time	Notes
Strawweight Muay Thai	(Thailand) Kongchai Chanaidonmuang	def.	(Thailand) Chokpreecha P.K.Saenchai	Decision (unanimous)	3	3:00	
Catchweight (129 lbs) Muay Thai	(Scotland) Stephen Irvine	def.	(Thailand) Denkriangkrai Singha Mawynn	Decision (unanimous)	3	3:00	
Catchweight (128 lbs) Muay Thai	(Thailand) Singdomthong Nokjeanladkrabang	def.	(Thailand) Watcharapon Singha Mawynn	KO (punch)	1	1:38	
Catchweight (140 lbs) Muay Thai	(Thailand) Kritsana DaodenMuayThai	def.	(Laos) Lamnamkhong BS.MuayThai	Decision (unanimous)	3	3:00	
Catchweight (122 lbs) Muay Thai	(Thailand) Khunpon Or.AudUdon	def.	(Thailand) Petchayut Nupranburi	TKO (punches and knee)	2	2:18	
Catchweight (122 lbs) Muay Thai	(Thailand) Payaksurin Sit. JP	def.	(Thailand) Pettapee Rongrienkelasurat	TKO (punches)	3	1:24	
Bantamweight Muay Thai	(United States) Kendu Irving	def.	(China) Miao Aoqi	Decision (unanimous)	3	3:00	
Atomweight Muay Thai	(Germany) Marwin Dittrich	def.	(Chinese Taipei) Li-Chih Yeh	TKO (punches and elbow)	3	2:59	
Catchweight (120 lbs) Kickboxing	(Japan) Kojiro Shiba	def.	(United States) Jamark Cooper	KO (head kick)	3	2:34	
Strawweight MMA	(Philippines) Eros Baluyot	def.	(Russia) Changy Kara-Ool	Submission (heel hook)	2	1:06	
Featherweight MMA	(Japan) Seiya Matsuda	def.	(Bulgaria) Rusi Hadzhiev	Decision (unanimous)	3	5:00	

== ONE Friday Fights 88 ==
ONE Friday Fights 88: Pompet vs. Ortikov
- Promotion: ONE Championship
- Date: November 22, 2024
- Venue: Lumpinee Boxing Stadium
- City: Bangkok, Thailand

ONE Friday Fights 88: Pompet vs. Ortikov (also known as ONE Lumpinee 88) was a combat sports event produced by ONE Championship that took place on November 22, 2024, at Lumpinee Boxing Stadium in Bangkok, Thailand.

=== Background ===
The event is expected to be headlined by a 130-pounds muay thai bout between Pompet P.K.Saenchai and Aslamjon Ortikov.

=== Bonus awards ===
The following fighters received $10,000 bonuses:

- Performance of the Night: Raksaensuk Sor.Tor.Hiewbangsaen, Abdelali Zahidi, Hiroki Naruo and Harlysson Nunes

=== Results ===
ONE Friday Fights 88 (YouTube / Watch ONE)
Weight Class				Method	Round	Time	Notes
Catchweight (130 lbs) Muay Thai	(Uzbekistan) Aslamjon Ortikov	def.	(Thailand) Pompet P.K.Saenchai	Decision (unanimous)	3	3:00	
Catchweight (131 lbs) Muay Thai	(Thailand) Sornsueknoi FA.Group	def.	(Thailand) Sing Sor.Chokmeechai	Decision (split)	3	3:00	
Catchweight (126 lbs) Muay Thai	(Thailand) Theptaksin Sor.Sornsing	def.	(Russia) Ivan Buldakov	Decision (unanimous)	3	3:00	
Catchweight (131 lbs) Muay Thai	(Thailand) Apiwat Sor.Somnuk	def.	(Thailand) Yodkritsada Sor.Sommai	Decision (majority)	3	3:00	
Catchweight (128 lbs) Muay Thai	(Thailand) Kaotaem Fairtex	def.	(Thailand) Lamsing Sor.Dechapan	Decision (unanimous)	3	3:00	
Catchweight (122 lbs) Muay Thai	(Thailand) Raksaensuk Sor.Tor.Hiewbangsaen	def.	(Thailand) Thapluang Petkiatpet	KO (punches to the body and knee)	3	0:42	
Flyweight Muay Thai	(Russia) Ibragim Abdulmedzhidov	def.	(Thailand) Duangsompong Jitmuangnon	KO (punch)	1	2:23	Abdulmedzhidov missed weight (138.6 lb).
Catchweight (158 lbs) Muay Thai	(Morocco) Abdelali Zahidi	def.	(Myanmar) Tun Min Aung	KO (head kick)	2	2:40	
Flyweight Kickboxing	(Japan) Hiroki Naruo	def.	(China) Zhang Jinhu	TKO (body kick and punches)	3	1:23	
Bantamweight MMA	(Brazil) Harlysson Nunes	def.	(Belarus) Ilyas Eziev	TKO (upkick and punches)	2	2:16	
Lightweight Submission Grappling	(Russia) Vladimir Kuchmistyi	def.	(England) Craig Hutchinson	Decision (unanimous)	1	10:00	

== ONE Friday Fights 89 ==
ONE Friday Fights 89: Yod-IQ vs. Khomutov
- Promotion: ONE Championship
- Date: November 29, 2024
- Venue: Lumpinee Boxing Stadium
- City: Bangkok, Thailand

ONE Friday Fights 89: Yod-IQ vs. Khomutov (also known as ONE Lumpinee 89) was a combat sports event produced by ONE Championship that took place on November 29, 2024, at Lumpinee Boxing Stadium in Bangkok, Thailand.

=== Background ===
A bantamweight Muay Thai bout between Yod-IQ Or.Pimonsri and Kirill Khomutov headlined the event.

=== Bonus awards ===
The following fighters received $10,000 bonuses:

- Performance of the Night: Tonglampoon FA.Group, Mungkorn Boomdeksean, Dionatha Santos Tobias, Lothong Kruaynaimuanggym, Pol Pascual, Rustam Yunusov and Marwin Quirante

=== Results ===
ONE Friday Fights 89 (YouTube / Watch ONE)
Weight Class				Method	Round	Time	Notes
Bantamweight Muay Thai	(Thailand) Yod-IQ Or.Pimolsri	def.	(Russia) Kirill Khomutov	Decision (split)	3	3:00	
Catchweight (122 lbs) Muay Thai	(Thailand) Pataknin SinbiMuayThai	def.	(Laos) Petnamkhong Mongkolpet	Decision (unanimous)	3	3:00	
Catchweight (119 lbs) Muay Thai	(Thailand) Tonglampoon FA.Group	def.	(Thailand) Mungkorn Boomdeksean	Decision (split)	3	3:00	
Catchweight (118 lbs) Muay Thai	(Brazil) Dionatha Santos Tobias	def.	(Thailand) Mahahin Petkiatpet	KO (punch to the body)	2	2:50	
Catchweight (128 lbs) Muay Thai	(Thailand) Lothong Kruaynaimuanggym	def.	(Laos) Songpandin Chor.Kaewwiset	KO (head kick and punch)	2	1:22	
Catchweight (126 lbs) Muay Thai	(Spain) Pol Pascual	def.	(Thailand) Petkiri Pongsevenfarm	TKO (punches)	1	2:55	
Featherweight Muay Thai	(Thailand) Khunsuek SuperbonTrainingCamp	def.	(Iran) Mohammad Siasarani	Decision (unanimous)	3	3:00	
Flyweight Muay Thai	(Russia) Rustam Yunusov	def.	(Morocco) Toufiq Chabibi	KO (elbow and knee)	2	2:58	Chabibi missed weight (138 lb).
Bantamweight Kickboxing	(Uzbekistan) Uzair Ismoiljonov	def.	(Japan) Rikito	Decision (split)	3	3:00	
Women's Atomweight Muay Thai	(Thailand) Tangtang Suansunandhagym	def.	(Japan) Wakana Tsujii	Decision (unanimous)	3	3:00	
Strawweight MMA	(Philippines) Marwin Quirante	def.	(Azerbaijan) Musa Musazade	Submission (rear-naked choke)	2	4:03	

== ONE Friday Fights 90 ==
ONE Friday Fights 90: Kongklai vs. Kacem
- Promotion: ONE Championship
- Date: December 6, 2024
- Venue: Lumpinee Boxing Stadium
- City: Bangkok, Thailand

ONE Friday Fights 90: Kongklai vs. Kacem (also known as ONE Lumpinee 90) was a combat sports event produced by ONE Championship that took place on December 6, 2024, at Lumpinee Boxing Stadium in Bangkok, Thailand.

=== Background ===
The event was headlined by a 142-pounds muay thai bout between Kongklai Sor.Sommai and Antar Kacem.

=== Bonus awards ===
The following fighters received $10,000 bonuses:

- Performance of the Night: Antar Kacem, Asadula Imangazaliev, Xavier Gonzalez, Alessio Malatesta and Ubaid Hussain

=== Results ===
ONE Friday Fights 90 (YouTube / Watch ONE)
Weight Class				Method	Round	Time	Notes
Catchweight (142 lbs) Muay Thai	(Belarus) Antar Kacem	def.	(Thailand) Kongklai Sor.Sommai	KO (punches)	2	0:45	Kongklai missed weight (143.8 lb).
Flyweight Muay Thai	(Russia) Asadula Imangazaliev	def.	(Thailand) Dedduanglek Wankhongohm MBK	KO (spinning backfist)	1	1:00	
Catchweight (130 lbs) Muay Thai	(Thailand) Rambong Sor.Therapat	def.	(Thailand) Patakake SinbiMuayThai	Decision (unanimous)	3	3:00	
Catchweight (142 lbs) Muay Thai	(Turkey) Şoner Şen	def.	(Thailand) Petgarfield Jitmuangnon	TKO (punches)	1	2:47	
Catchweight (130 lbs) Muay Thai	(Spain) Xavier Gonzalez	def.	(Thailand) Petkitti JiabRamintra	KO (punches)	2	2:21	
Catchweight (147 lbs) Muay Thai	(Italy) Alessio Malatesta	def.	(Portugal) Fabio Reis	KO (head kick)	1	2:53	
Catchweight (132 lbs) Muay Thai	(Pakistan) Ubaid Hussain	def.	(Thailand) Petsinchai Kingballroofphuket	KO (knees and punch)	1	2:10	
Catchweight (167 lbs) Muay Thai	(Russia) Denis Burmatov	def.	(Algeria) Ayoub Bahri	Decision (unanimous)	3	3:00	
Catchweight (159 lbs) Muay Thai	(Scotland) Rudy Da Silva	def.	(Japan) Kaisei Sato	Decision (unanimous)	3	3:00	
Lightweight Muay Thai	(England) Joe Welch	def.	(Australia) Meeka Michael	Decision (unanimous)	3	3:00	
Flyweight MMA	(Uzbekistan) Avazbek Kholmirzaev	def.	(Russia) Valmir Galiev	Submission (rear-naked choke)	2	1:32	

== ONE Friday Fights 91 ==
ONE Friday Fights 91: Komawut vs. Balyko
- Promotion: ONE Championship
- Date: December 13, 2024
- Venue: Lumpinee Boxing Stadium
- City: Bangkok, Thailand

ONE Friday Fights 91: Komawut vs. Balyko (also known as ONE Lumpinee 91) was a combat sports event produced by ONE Championship that took place on December 13, 2024, at Lumpinee Boxing Stadium in Bangkok, Thailand.

=== Background ===
The event was headlined by a 140-pounds muay thai bout between Komawut FA.Group and Alexey Balyko.

=== Bonus awards ===
The following fighters received $10,000 bonuses:

- Performance of the Night: Freddie Haggerty, Padejsuk N.F.Looksuan and Lee Seung-Chul

=== Results ===
ONE Friday Fights 91 (YouTube / Watch ONE)
Weight Class				Method	Round	Time	Notes
Catchweight (140 lbs) Muay Thai	(Thailand) Komawut FA.Group	def.	(Russia) Alexey Balyko	Decision (unanimous)	3	3:00	
Catchweight (139 lbs) Muay Thai	(Myanmar) Sonrak Fairtex	def.	(Thailand) Petwichit Singha Mawynn	Decision (unanimous)	3	3:00	
Strawweight Muay Thai	(Thailand) Petsansab Sor.Jaruwan	def.	(Thailand) Dabdam Por.Tor.Tor.Thongtawee	Decision (unanimous)	3	3:00	
Catchweight (140 lbs) Muay Thai	(Thailand) Jaruadsuk Sor.Jor.Wichitpadriew	def.	(Sweden) Amir El Dakkak	Decision (unanimous)	3	3:00	
Catchweight (130 lbs) Muay Thai	(Thailand) Sirichok Sor.Sommai	def.	(Thailand) Tanachart Por.Patcharawat	KO (punches)	1	0:57	
Catchweight (117 lbs) Muay Thai	(Thailand) Yodsinlapa Rodsuayjajed	def.	(Thailand) Tienngam Nakbinalaiyon	KO (punches)	2	0:15	
Strawweight Muay Thai	(England) Freddie Haggerty	def.	(Thailand) Kaoklai Chor.Hapayak	TKO (punches)	3	1:48	
Catchweight (122 lbs) Muay Thai	(Thailand) Padejsuk N.F.Looksuan	def.	(Japan) Hiroyuki	TKO (elbow)	1	2:57	
Strawweight Muay Thai	(Japan) Yugo Kato	def.	(China) Ke Jingjun	KO (punches)	2	1:06	
Catchweight (112 lbs) Muay Thai	(Thailand) Nongfahsai TOP P.K.Saenchai	def.	(Sweden) Moa Carlsson	Decision (unanimous)	3	3:00	
Strawweight MMA	(South Korea) Lee Seung-chul	def.	(Vietnam) Phạm Văn Nam	TKO (punches)	2	3:15	
Women's Strawweight MMA	(Azerbaijan) Zemfira Alieva	def.	(China) Yu Gao	TKO (punches)	2	1:06	

== ONE Friday Fights 92 ==
ONE Friday Fights 92: Sitthichai vs. Shadow
- Promotion: ONE Championship
- Date: December 20, 2024
- Venue: Lumpinee Boxing Stadium
- City: Bangkok, Thailand

ONE Friday Fights 92: Sitthichai vs. Shadow (also known as ONE Lumpinee 92) was a combat sports event produced by ONE Championship that took place on December 20, 2024, at Lumpinee Boxing Stadium in Bangkok, Thailand.

=== Background ===
A featherweight Muay Thai bout between former Glory Lightweight Champion Sitthichai Sitsongpeenong and Shadow Singha Mawynn headlined the event.

=== Bonus awards ===
The following fighters received bonuses:

- Performance of the Night ($20,000): Suakim Sor.Jor.Tongprajin
- Performance of the Night ($10,000): Songchainoi Kiatsongrit, Egor Bikrev, Rak Erawan, Watcharapon P.K.Saenchai and Shimon Yoshinari

=== Results ===
ONE Friday Fights 92 (YouTube / Watch ONE)
Weight Class				Method	Round	Time	Notes
Featherweight Muay Thai	(Thailand) Shadow Singha Mawynn	def.	(Thailand) Sitthichai Sitsongpeenong	Decision (unanimous)	3	3:00	
Catchweight (140 lbs) Muay Thai	(Thailand) Suakim Sor.Jor.Tongprajin	def.	(Thailand) Panrit Lukjaomaesaiwaree	KO (punch)	2	2:57	Panrit missed weight (140.4 lb).
Atomweight Muay Thai	(Thailand) Songchainoi Kiatsongrit	def.	(Thailand) Yodnumchai Fairtex	KO (punches)	2	1:18	
Flyweight Muay Thai	(Russia) Egor Bikrev	def.	(Thailand) Panpayak Jitmuangnon	KO (punch)	2	1:08	
Bantamweight Muay Thai	(Russia) Abdulla Dayakaev	def.	(Thailand) Sibmuen Sitchefboontham	KO (punch)	1	0:35	Dayakaev missed weight (147.2 lb).
Atomweight Muay Thai	(Thailand) Rak Erawan	def.	(Thailand) Koko Sor.Sommai	TKO (retirement)	1	3:00	
Catchweight (159 lbs) Kickboxing	(Armenia) Marat Grigorian	def.	(Morocco) Abdelali Zahidi	KO (punches)	2	2:36	
Catchweight (121 lbs) Muay Thai	(Thailand) Watcharapon P.K.Saenchai	def.	(Thailand) Maisangkum Sor. Yingcharoenkarnchang	KO (punches)	1	2:22	
Featherweight Kickboxing	(China) Liu Mengyang	def.	(Japan) Masaaki Noiri	Decision (unanimous)	3	3:00	
Women's Atomweight Kickboxing	(France) Anissa Meksen	def.	(Japan) Kana Morimoto	Decision (unanimous)	3	3:00	
Catchweight (134 lbs) Muay Thai	(Japan) Shimon Yoshinari	def.	(Thailand) Rittidet Sor.Sommai	TKO (punches and elbows)	2	0:39	
Bantamweight Kickboxing	(Russia) Elbrus Osmanov	def.	(England) Nathan Bendon	Decision (unanimous)	3	3:00	

== See also ==
- List of current ONE fighters
- 2024 in UFC
- 2024 in Bellator MMA
- 2024 in Professional Fighters League
- 2024 in Absolute Championship Akhmat
- 2024 in Konfrontacja Sztuk Walki
- 2024 in Rizin Fighting Federation
- 2024 in LUX Fight League
- 2024 in Oktagon MMA
- 2024 in Brave Combat Federation
- 2024 in UAE Warriors
- 2024 in Legacy Fighting Alliance
- 2024 in Cage Warriors
- 2024 in Glory
- 2024 in K-1
- 2024 in RISE
- 2024 in Romanian kickboxing
- 2024 in Wu Lin Feng
- 2024 in Kunlun Fight
