= 2025 in ONE Championship =

Mixed martial arts events

Information
- First date: January 10, 2025
- Last date: December 19, 2025

Events
- Total events: 60 (1)
- ONE Fight Night: 12
- ONE Friday Fights: 44 (1)

Fights
- Total fights: 674 (12)
- Title fights: 26

The year 2025 was the 15th year in the history of the ONE Championship, a mixed martial arts, kickboxing, Muay Thai and submission grappling promotion based in the Cayman Islands.

== Events list ==
=== Past events ===
#	Event	Date	Venue	City	Country	Performance of the Night		Bonus	Ref.
371	ONE Friday Fights 137: Tawanchai vs. Liu	December 19, 2025	Lumpinee Boxing Stadium	Bangkok	Thailand	Sam-A Gaiyanghadao	Mohammad Siasarani	$10,000	
371	ONE Friday Fights 137: Tawanchai vs. Liu	December 19, 2025	Lumpinee Boxing Stadium	Bangkok	Thailand	Yod-IQ Or.Pimolsri	Gingsanglek Tor.Laksong	$10,000	
371	ONE Friday Fights 137: Tawanchai vs. Liu	December 19, 2025	Lumpinee Boxing Stadium	Bangkok	Thailand	Suriyanlek Por.Yenying	Duangdawnoi Looksaikongdin	$10,000	
370	ONE Friday Fights 136: Petkhaokradong vs. Kelat	December 12, 2025	Lumpinee Boxing Stadium	Bangkok	Thailand	Ali Kelat	Kraithong P.U.Phabai	$10,000	
370	ONE Friday Fights 136: Petkhaokradong vs. Kelat	December 12, 2025	Lumpinee Boxing Stadium	Bangkok	Thailand	Hiroyuki	Lee Seung-chul	$10,000	
369	ONE Fight Night 38: Andrade vs. Baatarkhuu	December 6, 2025	Lumpinee Boxing Stadium	Bangkok	Thailand	Enkh-Orgil Baatarkhuu	—N/a	$50,000	
368	ONE Friday Fights 135: Worapon vs. Lobo	November 28, 2025	Lumpinee Boxing Stadium	Bangkok	Thailand	Tom Keogh	Kojiro Shiba	$10,000	
367	ONE Friday Fights 134: Yodlekpet vs. Mammadov	November 21, 2025	Lumpinee Boxing Stadium	Bangkok	Thailand	Islay Erika Bomogao	Hyuga	$10,000	
366	ONE 173: Superbon vs. Noiri	November 16, 2025	Ariake Arena	Tokyo	Japan	Yuya Wakamatsu	Christian Lee	$50,000	
366	ONE 173: Superbon vs. Noiri	November 16, 2025	Ariake Arena	Tokyo	Japan	Takeru Segawa	Tye Ruotolo	$50,000	
366	ONE 173: Superbon vs. Noiri	November 16, 2025	Ariake Arena	Tokyo	Japan	Suakim Sor.Jor.Tongprajin	—N/a	$50,000	
365	ONE Friday Fights 133: Pompet vs. Thom	November 14, 2025	Lumpinee Boxing Stadium	Bangkok	Thailand	Pompet Panthonggym	Valerii Strungari	$10,000	
365	ONE Friday Fights 133: Pompet vs. Thom	November 14, 2025	Lumpinee Boxing Stadium	Bangkok	Thailand	Payak Saksatoon	—N/a	$10,000	
364	ONE Fight Night 37: Kryklia vs. Agdeve	November 8, 2025	Lumpinee Boxing Stadium	Bangkok	Thailand	—N/a	—N/a		
363	ONE Friday Fights 132: Kompetch vs. Ondash	November 7, 2025	Lumpinee Boxing Stadium	Bangkok	Thailand	Abdallah Ondash	YodUdon BS.Muay Thai	$10,000	
363	ONE Friday Fights 132: Kompetch vs. Ondash	November 7, 2025	Lumpinee Boxing Stadium	Bangkok	Thailand	Pet Suanluangrodyok	Otis Waghorn	$10,000	
363	ONE Friday Fights 132: Kompetch vs. Ondash	November 7, 2025	Lumpinee Boxing Stadium	Bangkok	Thailand	Norika Ryu	—N/a	$10,000	
362	ONE Friday Fights 131: Suriyanlek vs. Decho 2	October 31, 2025	Lumpinee Boxing Stadium	Bangkok	Thailand	Mohamed Taoufyq	Rustam Yunusov	$10,000	
361	ONE Friday Fights 130: Nonthachai vs. Şen	October 24, 2025	Lumpinee Boxing Stadium	Bangkok	Thailand	Thapluang Petkiatpet	Sonrak Fairtex	$10,000	
361	ONE Friday Fights 130: Nonthachai vs. Şen	October 24, 2025	Lumpinee Boxing Stadium	Bangkok	Thailand	Titus Proctor	Shoma Okumura	$10,000	
360	ONE Friday Fights 129: Tengnueng vs. Tun Min Aung	October 17, 2025	Lumpinee Boxing Stadium	Bangkok	Thailand	Ayad Albadr	Brazil Aekmuangnon	$10,000	
360	ONE Friday Fights 129: Tengnueng vs. Tun Min Aung	October 17, 2025	Lumpinee Boxing Stadium	Bangkok	Thailand	Petchakrit Gavingym	Fergus Smith	$10,000	
359	ONE Friday Fights 128: Irvine vs. Rambong	October 10, 2025	Lumpinee Boxing Stadium	Bangkok	Thailand	Stephen Irvine	Anar Mammadov	$10,000	
359	ONE Friday Fights 128: Irvine vs. Rambong	October 10, 2025	Lumpinee Boxing Stadium	Bangkok	Thailand	Theraphon Dangkhaosai	—N/a	$10,000	
358	ONE Fight Night 36: Prajanchai vs. Di Bella 2	October 4, 2025	Lumpinee Boxing Stadium	Bangkok	Thailand	Jonathan Di Bella	Aung La Nsang	$50,000	
358	ONE Fight Night 36: Prajanchai vs. Di Bella 2	October 4, 2025	Lumpinee Boxing Stadium	Bangkok	Thailand	Shozo Isojima	—N/a	$50,000	
357	ONE Friday Fights 127: Worapon vs. Kongkula	October 3, 2025	Lumpinee Boxing Stadium	Bangkok	Thailand	Parham Gheirati	Pichitchai P.K.Saenchai	$10,000	
357	ONE Friday Fights 127: Worapon vs. Kongkula	October 3, 2025	Lumpinee Boxing Stadium	Bangkok	Thailand	Panpadej N.F.Looksuan	Tepkamin Tanapolresort	$10,000	
357	ONE Friday Fights 127: Worapon vs. Kongkula	October 3, 2025	Lumpinee Boxing Stadium	Bangkok	Thailand	Bogdan Shumarov	Lucas Ganin	$10,000	
357	ONE Friday Fights 127: Worapon vs. Kongkula	October 3, 2025	Lumpinee Boxing Stadium	Bangkok	Thailand	Jean Claude Saclag	—N/a	$10,000	
356	ONE Friday Fights 126: Ennahachi vs. Anane	September 26, 2025	Lumpinee Boxing Stadium	Bangkok	Thailand	Antar Kacem	Jurai Ishii	$10,000	
355	ONE Friday Fights 125: Saemapetch vs. Osmanov	September 19, 2025	Lumpinee Boxing Stadium	Bangkok	Thailand	Logan Chan	—N/a	$10,000	
354	ONE Friday Fights 124: Suriyanlek vs. Decho	September 12, 2025	Lumpinee Boxing Stadium	Bangkok	Thailand	Sandro Bosi	YodUdon BS.Muaythai	$10,000	
354	ONE Friday Fights 124: Suriyanlek vs. Decho	September 12, 2025	Lumpinee Boxing Stadium	Bangkok	Thailand	Alaverdi Ramazanov	Zhao Chongyang	$10,000	
353	ONE Fight Night 35: Buntan vs. Hemetsberger	September 6, 2025	Lumpinee Boxing Stadium	Bangkok	Thailand	Shadow Singha Mawynn	Tye Ruotolo	$50,000	
353	ONE Fight Night 35: Buntan vs. Hemetsberger	September 6, 2025	Lumpinee Boxing Stadium	Bangkok	Thailand	Hyu Iwata	—N/a	$50,000	
352	ONE Friday Fights 123: Lobo vs. Kulabdam	September 5, 2025	Lumpinee Boxing Stadium	Bangkok	Thailand	Ayad Albadr	—N/a	$10,000	
351	ONE Friday Fights 122: Panpayak vs. Imangazaliev	August 29, 2025	Lumpinee Boxing Stadium	Bangkok	Thailand	Asadula Imangazaliev	Tonglampoon FA.Group	$10,000	
351	ONE Friday Fights 122: Panpayak vs. Imangazaliev	August 29, 2025	Lumpinee Boxing Stadium	Bangkok	Thailand	Kohtao Petsomnuk	Isannuea Chotbangsaen	$10,000	
350	ONE Friday Fights 121: Tengnueng vs. Bakhtin	August 22, 2025	Lumpinee Boxing Stadium	Bangkok	Thailand	Maksim Bakhtin	Thway Lin Htet	$10,000	
350	ONE Friday Fights 121: Tengnueng vs. Bakhtin	August 22, 2025	Lumpinee Boxing Stadium	Bangkok	Thailand	Petchakrit Gavingym	Shimon Yoshinari	$10,000	
350	ONE Friday Fights 121: Tengnueng vs. Bakhtin	August 22, 2025	Lumpinee Boxing Stadium	Bangkok	Thailand	Ryuya Okuwaki	—N/a	$10,000	
349	ONE Friday Fights 120: Yodlekpet vs. Pompet	August 15, 2025	Lumpinee Boxing Stadium	Bangkok	Thailand	Gingsanglek Tor.Laksong	Wuttikrai Wor.Chakrawut	$10,000	
349	ONE Friday Fights 120: Yodlekpet vs. Pompet	August 15, 2025	Lumpinee Boxing Stadium	Bangkok	Thailand	Jurai Ishii	—N/a	$10,000	
348	ONE Friday Fights 119: Samingdam vs. Sonrak	August 8, 2025	Lumpinee Boxing Stadium	Bangkok	Thailand	Petlampun Muadablampang	Abdessamie Rhenimi	$10,000	
348	ONE Friday Fights 119: Samingdam vs. Sonrak	August 8, 2025	Lumpinee Boxing Stadium	Bangkok	Thailand	Sanit Lookthamsuea	Masahito Okuyama	$10,000	
347	ONE Fight Night 34: Eersel vs. Jarvis	August 2, 2025	Lumpinee Boxing Stadium	Bangkok	Thailand	Regian Eersel	Ryugo Takeuchi	$50,000	
346	ONE Friday Fights 118: Worapon vs. Şen 3	August 1, 2025	Lumpinee Boxing Stadium	Bangkok	Thailand	Zhang Jingtao	—N/a	$10,000	
345	ONE Friday Fights 117: Yod-IQ vs. Malatesta	July 25, 2025	Lumpinee Boxing Stadium	Bangkok	Thailand	Elbrus Osmanov	Teeyai P.K.Saenchai	$10,000	
345	ONE Friday Fights 117: Yod-IQ vs. Malatesta	July 25, 2025	Lumpinee Boxing Stadium	Bangkok	Thailand	Tyson Harrison	—N/a	$10,000	
344	ONE Friday Fights 116: Adam vs. Mohammed 2	July 18, 2025	Lumpinee Boxing Stadium	Bangkok	Thailand	Nahyan Mohammed	Antar Kacem	$10,000	
344	ONE Friday Fights 116: Adam vs. Mohammed 2	July 18, 2025	Lumpinee Boxing Stadium	Bangkok	Thailand	Tomyamkoong Bhumjaithai	Pamor-E-Daeng Chor.Chokamnuaychai	$10,000	
344	ONE Friday Fights 116: Adam vs. Mohammed 2	July 18, 2025	Lumpinee Boxing Stadium	Bangkok	Thailand	Isaac Mohammed	—N/a	$10,000	
343	ONE Fight Night 33: Rodrigues vs. Persson	July 12, 2025	Lumpinee Boxing Stadium	Bangkok	Thailand	Allycia Rodrigues	Abdulla Dayakaev	$50,000	
342	ONE Friday Fights 115: Rambong vs. Suriyanlek	July 4, 2025	Lumpinee Boxing Stadium	Bangkok	Thailand	Suriyanlek Por.Yenying	Gingsanglek Tor.Laksong	$10,000	
342	ONE Friday Fights 115: Rambong vs. Suriyanlek	July 4, 2025	Lumpinee Boxing Stadium	Bangkok	Thailand	Shoya Ishiguro	—N/a	$10,000	
341	ONE Friday Fights 114: Sangarthit vs Suablack	June 27, 2025	Lumpinee Boxing Stadium	Bangkok	Thailand	Muangthai P.K.Saenchai	Saeksan Or. Kwanmuang	$10,000	
341	ONE Friday Fights 114: Sangarthit vs Suablack	June 27, 2025	Lumpinee Boxing Stadium	Bangkok	Thailand	Aslamjon Ortikov	Ramadan Ondash	$10,000	
341	ONE Friday Fights 114: Sangarthit vs Suablack	June 27, 2025	Lumpinee Boxing Stadium	Bangkok	Thailand	Jurai Ishii	—N/a	$10,000	
340	ONE Friday Fights 113: Donking vs. Yodlekpet	June 20, 2025	Lumpinee Boxing Stadium	Bangkok	Thailand	Yodlekpet Or.Atchariya	Numsurin Chor.Ketwina	$10,000	
340	ONE Friday Fights 113: Donking vs. Yodlekpet	June 20, 2025	Lumpinee Boxing Stadium	Bangkok	Thailand	Asadula Imangazaliev	—N/a	$10,000	
339	ONE Friday Fights 112: Singdomthong vs. Ondash	June 13, 2025	Lumpinee Boxing Stadium	Bangkok	Thailand	Thway Lin Htet	Payaksurin JP.Power	$10,000	
339	ONE Friday Fights 112: Singdomthong vs. Ondash	June 13, 2025	Lumpinee Boxing Stadium	Bangkok	Thailand	Samanchai Sor.Sommai	Tahaneak Nayokatasala	$10,000	
339	ONE Friday Fights 112: Singdomthong vs. Ondash	June 13, 2025	Lumpinee Boxing Stadium	Bangkok	Thailand	Hiroki Naruo	—N/a	$10,000	
338	ONE Fight Night 32: Nakrob vs. Jaosuayai	June 7, 2025	Lumpinee Boxing Stadium	Bangkok	Thailand	Jaosuayai Mor. Krungthepthonburi	—N/a	$50,000	
337	ONE Friday Fights 111: Phetsukumvit vs. Vitez	June 6, 2025	Lumpinee Boxing Stadium	Bangkok	Thailand	Pompet Panthonggym	Islay Erika Bomogao	$10,000	
337	ONE Friday Fights 111: Phetsukumvit vs. Vitez	June 6, 2025	Lumpinee Boxing Stadium	Bangkok	Thailand	Michael Baranov	Maksim Bakhtin	$10,000	
336	ONE Friday Fights 110: Worapon vs. Musaev	May 30, 2025	Lumpinee Boxing Stadium	Bangkok	Thailand	Samingdam N.F.Looksuan	Lamsing Sor.Dechapan	$10,000	
336	ONE Friday Fights 110: Worapon vs. Musaev	May 30, 2025	Lumpinee Boxing Stadium	Bangkok	Thailand	Tun Min Aung	YodUdon BS Muaythai	$10,000	
336	ONE Friday Fights 110: Worapon vs. Musaev	May 30, 2025	Lumpinee Boxing Stadium	Bangkok	Thailand	Toyota Eaglemuaythai	—N/a	$10,000	
335	ONE Friday Fights 109: Yod-IQ vs. Delval	May 23, 2025	Lumpinee Boxing Stadium	Bangkok	Thailand	Wuttikrai Wor.Chakrawut	Chama Superbon Training Camp	$10,000	
335	ONE Friday Fights 109: Yod-IQ vs. Delval	May 23, 2025	Lumpinee Boxing Stadium	Bangkok	Thailand	Bernueng Sor.Salacheep	Alessio Malatesta	$10,000	
334	ONE Friday Fights 108: Chokpreecha vs. Kongchai 2	May 16, 2025	Lumpinee Boxing Stadium	Bangkok	Thailand	Kongchai Chanaidonmuang	Aekkalak Sor.Samarngarment	$10,000	
334	ONE Friday Fights 108: Chokpreecha vs. Kongchai 2	May 16, 2025	Lumpinee Boxing Stadium	Bangkok	Thailand	Tengnueng Fairtex	—N/a	$10,000	
333	ONE Friday Fights 107: Ortikov vs. Dedduanglek	May 9, 2025	Lumpinee Boxing Stadium	Bangkok	Thailand	Vero Nika	Isaac Mohammed	$10,000	
333	ONE Friday Fights 107: Ortikov vs. Dedduanglek	May 9, 2025	Lumpinee Boxing Stadium	Bangkok	Thailand	Norika Ryu	—N/a	$10,000	
332	ONE Fight Night 31: Kongthoranee vs. Nong-O 2	May 3, 2025	Lumpinee Boxing Stadium	Bangkok	Thailand	Nong-O Hama	—N/a	$50,000	
331	ONE Friday Fights 106: Panrit vs. Suksawat	May 2, 2025	Lumpinee Boxing Stadium	Bangkok	Thailand	Panrit Lukjaomaesaiwaree	Banluelok Sitwatcharachai	$10,000	
331	ONE Friday Fights 106: Panrit vs. Suksawat	May 2, 2025	Lumpinee Boxing Stadium	Bangkok	Thailand	Rustam Yunusov	—N/a	$10,000	
330	ONE Friday Fights 105: Kongsuk vs. Lamnamoonlek 2	April 18, 2025	Lumpinee Boxing Stadium	Bangkok	Thailand	Kaotaem Fairtex	Jaradchai Maxjandee	$10,000	
330	ONE Friday Fights 105: Kongsuk vs. Lamnamoonlek 2	April 18, 2025	Lumpinee Boxing Stadium	Bangkok	Thailand	Tezuka Shota	—N/a	$10,000	
329	ONE Friday Fights 104: Chartpayak vs. Kompetch 2	April 11, 2025	Lumpinee Boxing Stadium	Bangkok	Thailand	Chartpayak Saksatoon	Pet Suanluangrodyok	$10,000	
329	ONE Friday Fights 104: Chartpayak vs. Kompetch 2	April 11, 2025	Lumpinee Boxing Stadium	Bangkok	Thailand	Petninmungkorn NamkaengIceland	Stella Hemetsberger	$10,000	
329	ONE Friday Fights 104: Chartpayak vs. Kompetch 2	April 11, 2025	Lumpinee Boxing Stadium	Bangkok	Thailand	Hiroki Naruo	—N/a	$10,000	
328	ONE Fight Night 30: Kryklia vs. Knowles	April 5, 2025	Lumpinee Boxing Stadium	Bangkok	Thailand	Roman Kryklia	Nico Carrillo	$50,000	
327	ONE Friday Fights 103: Kulabdam vs. Çiçek	April 4, 2025	Lumpinee Boxing Stadium	Bangkok	Thailand	Kulabdam Sor.Jor.Piek-U-Thai	Watcharapon P.K.Saenchai	$10,000	
327	ONE Friday Fights 103: Kulabdam vs. Çiçek	April 4, 2025	Lumpinee Boxing Stadium	Bangkok	Thailand	Face Erawan	Lucas Ganin	$10,000	
–	ONE Friday Fights 102: Rambong vs. Pompet	March 28, 2025	Lumpinee Boxing Stadium	Bangkok	Thailand	–			Canceled
326	ONE 172: Takeru vs. Rodtang	March 23, 2025	Saitama Super Arena	Saitama	Japan	Rodtang Jitmuangnon	Masaaki Noiri	$50,000	
326	ONE 172: Takeru vs. Rodtang	March 23, 2025	Saitama Super Arena	Saitama	Japan	Yuya Wakamatsu	Adrian Lee	$50,000	
325	ONE Friday Fights 101: Nakrob vs. Puengluang	March 21, 2025	Lumpinee Boxing Stadium	Bangkok	Thailand	Nakrob Fairtex	Chokpreecha P.K.Saenchai	$10,000	
325	ONE Friday Fights 101: Nakrob vs. Puengluang	March 21, 2025	Lumpinee Boxing Stadium	Bangkok	Thailand	Khunsuek Superbon Training Camp	Carlos Alvarez	$10,000	
324	ONE Friday Fights 100: Muangthai vs. Abdulmedzhidov	March 14, 2025	Lumpinee Boxing Stadium	Bangkok	Thailand	Nieky Holzken	—N/a	$50,000	
324	ONE Friday Fights 100: Muangthai vs. Abdulmedzhidov	March 14, 2025	Lumpinee Boxing Stadium	Bangkok	Thailand	Muangthai P.K.Saenchai	Suakim Sor.Jor.Tongprajin	$10,000	
324	ONE Friday Fights 100: Muangthai vs. Abdulmedzhidov	March 14, 2025	Lumpinee Boxing Stadium	Bangkok	Thailand	Jaosuayai Mor.Krungthepthonburi	Shadow Singha Mawynn	$10,000	
324	ONE Friday Fights 100: Muangthai vs. Abdulmedzhidov	March 14, 2025	Lumpinee Boxing Stadium	Bangkok	Thailand	Jang Seong-gyu	—N/a	$10,000	
323	ONE Fight Night 29: Rodrigues vs. McManamon	March 8, 2025	Lumpinee Boxing Stadium	Bangkok	Thailand	Allycia Rodrigues	Rambolek Chor.Ajalaboon	$50,000	
323	ONE Fight Night 29: Rodrigues vs. McManamon	March 8, 2025	Lumpinee Boxing Stadium	Bangkok	Thailand	Shamil Erdogan	—N/a	$50,000	
322	ONE Friday Fights 99: Yod-IQ vs. Morari	March 7, 2025	Lumpinee Boxing Stadium	Bangkok	Thailand	Lamsing Sor.Dechapan	Wuttikrai Wor.Chakrawut	$10,000	
322	ONE Friday Fights 99: Yod-IQ vs. Morari	March 7, 2025	Lumpinee Boxing Stadium	Bangkok	Thailand	Haruyuki Tanitsu	Ivan Gnizditskiy	$10,000	
321	ONE Friday Fights 98: Chartpayak vs. Kongchai	February 28, 2025	Lumpinee Boxing Stadium	Bangkok	Thailand	Chabakaew Sor.Kanjanchai	Nongbia LaoLaneXang	$10,000	
321	ONE Friday Fights 98: Chartpayak vs. Kongchai	February 28, 2025	Lumpinee Boxing Stadium	Bangkok	Thailand	Issei Yonaha	—N/a	$10,000	
320	ONE 171: Qatar	February 20, 2025	Lusail Sports Arena	Lusail	Qatar	Joshua Pacio	Roberto Soldić	$50,000	
320	ONE 171: Qatar	February 20, 2025	Lusail Sports Arena	Lusail	Qatar	Shamil Erdogan	Ayaka Miura	$50,000	
320	ONE 171: Qatar	February 20, 2025	Lusail Sports Arena	Lusail	Qatar	Kade Ruotolo	—N/a	$50,000	
319	ONE Friday Fights 97: Kongsuk vs. Lamnamoonlek	February 14, 2025	Lumpinee Boxing Stadium	Bangkok	Thailand	Francisca Vera	Vero Nika	$10,000	
319	ONE Friday Fights 97: Kongsuk vs. Lamnamoonlek	February 14, 2025	Lumpinee Boxing Stadium	Bangkok	Thailand	Khunponnoi Sor.Sommai	Tomioka Yusei	$10,000	
319	ONE Friday Fights 97: Kongsuk vs. Lamnamoonlek	February 14, 2025	Lumpinee Boxing Stadium	Bangkok	Thailand	Jayson Miralpez	—N/a	$10,000	
318	ONE Fight Night 28: Prajanchai vs. Barboza	February 8, 2025	Lumpinee Boxing Stadium	Bangkok	Thailand	Prajanchai P.K.Saenchai	—N/a	$100,000	
318	ONE Fight Night 28: Prajanchai vs. Barboza	February 8, 2025	Lumpinee Boxing Stadium	Bangkok	Thailand	Zhang Lipeng	—N/a	$50,000	
317	ONE Friday Fights 96: Komawut vs. Panrit 2	February 7, 2025	Lumpinee Boxing Stadium	Bangkok	Thailand	Komawut FA.Group	Donking Yotharakmuaythai	$10,000	
317	ONE Friday Fights 96: Komawut vs. Panrit 2	February 7, 2025	Lumpinee Boxing Stadium	Bangkok	Thailand	Singtanawat Nokjeanladkrabang	Nahyan Mohammed	$10,000	
317	ONE Friday Fights 96: Komawut vs. Panrit 2	February 7, 2025	Lumpinee Boxing Stadium	Bangkok	Thailand	Abdulla Dayakaev	Hyu Iwata	$10,000	
316	ONE Friday Fights 95: Yodlekpet vs. Jaosuayai	January 31, 2025	Lumpinee Boxing Stadium	Bangkok	Thailand	Jaosuayai Mor.Krungthepthonburi	Chalamdam Sor.Boonmeerit	$10,000	
316	ONE Friday Fights 95: Yodlekpet vs. Jaosuayai	January 31, 2025	Lumpinee Boxing Stadium	Bangkok	Thailand	Padejsuk N.F.Looksuan	Jaroenporn TaiKubon	$10,000	
316	ONE Friday Fights 95: Yodlekpet vs. Jaosuayai	January 31, 2025	Lumpinee Boxing Stadium	Bangkok	Thailand	Kiamran Nabati	Eh Mwi	$10,000	
316	ONE Friday Fights 95: Yodlekpet vs. Jaosuayai	January 31, 2025	Lumpinee Boxing Stadium	Bangkok	Thailand	Robson De Oliveira	—N/a	$10,000	
315	ONE 170: Tawanchai vs. Superbon 2	January 24, 2025	Impact Arena	Bangkok	Thailand	Tawanchai P.K.Saenchai	Fabrício Andrade	$50,000	
315	ONE 170: Tawanchai vs. Superbon 2	January 24, 2025	Impact Arena	Bangkok	Thailand	Nabil Anane	Sinsamut Klinmee	$50,000	
314	ONE Friday Fights 94: Puengluang vs. Guluzada	January 17, 2025	Lumpinee Boxing Stadium	Bangkok	Thailand	Akif Guluzada	Kritpet P.K.Saenchai	$10,000	
314	ONE Friday Fights 94: Puengluang vs. Guluzada	January 17, 2025	Lumpinee Boxing Stadium	Bangkok	Thailand	Kunsuek Mor.Krungthepthonburi	Petnaya BangsaenFightclub	$10,000	
314	ONE Friday Fights 94: Puengluang vs. Guluzada	January 17, 2025	Lumpinee Boxing Stadium	Bangkok	Thailand	Pentor SP.KarnsartPaeminburi	—N/a	$10,000	
313	ONE Fight Night 27: Tang vs. Abdullaev	January 11, 2025	Lumpinee Boxing Stadium	Bangkok	Thailand	Denice Zamboanga	Luke Lessei	$50,000	
312	ONE Friday Fights 93: Kongchai vs. Ondash	January 10, 2025	Lumpinee Boxing Stadium	Bangkok	Thailand	Thway Lin Htet	Rocky Wor.Wantawee	$10,000	
312	ONE Friday Fights 93: Kongchai vs. Ondash	January 10, 2025	Lumpinee Boxing Stadium	Bangkok	Thailand	Abdallah Ondash	Haruyuki Tanitsu	$10,000	

== 2025 ONE Championship awards ==
=== 2025 Fighter of the Year ===
#	Fighters	Sports	Ref.
1	(Japan) Nadaka Yoshinari	Muay Thai	
2	(Japan) Yuya Wakamatsu	MMA	
3	(Brazil) Diogo Reis	Submission Grappling	
4	(Italy) Jonathan Di Bella	Kickboxing	

=== 2025 Breakout Star of the Year ===
#	Fighters	Sports	Ref.
1	(Algeria) Nabil Anane	Muay Thai / Kickboxing	
2	(Japan) Yuki Yoza	Kickboxing	
3	(Japan) Nadaka Yoshinari	Muay Thai	
4	(United States) Tye Ruotolo	MMA / Submission Grappling	
5	(Austria) Stella Hemetsberger	Muay Thai / Kickboxing	
5	(Turkey) Samet Agdeve	Kickboxing	

=== 2025 Fight of the Year ===
#				Method	Round	Time	Event	Ref.
1	(Mongolia) Enkh-Orgil Baatarkhuu	def.	(Brazil) Fabrício Andrade	Submission (rear-naked choke)	4	1:33	ONE Fight Night 38	
2	(Italy) Jonathan Di Bella	def.	(Thailand) Prajanchai P.K.Saenchai	Decision (unanimous)	5	3:00	ONE Fight Night 36	
3	(Japan) Yuki Yoza	def.	(Thailand) Superlek Kiatmuu9	Decision (unanimous)	3	3:00	ONE 173	
4	(United States) Tye Ruotolo	def.	(United States) Adrian Lee	Submission (rear-naked choke)	2	4:14	ONE Fight Night 35	
5	(Malaysia) Aliff Sor.Dechapan	def.	(Lebanon) Ramadan Ondash	Decision (unanimous)	3	3:00	ONE Fight Night 38	

=== 2025 Knockout of the Year ===
#				Method	Round	Time	Event	Ref.
1	(Croatia) Roberto Soldić	def.	(Turkey) Saygid Guseyn Arslanaliev	KO (punch)	1	1:55	ONE 171	
2	(Thailand) Gingsanglek Tor.Laksong	def.	(Russia) Alexey Balyko	KO (spinning backfist)	1	0:53	ONE Friday Fights 115	
3	(Thailand) Rodtang Jitmuangnon	def.	(Japan) Takeru Segawa	KO (punch)	1	1:20	ONE 172	
4	(Algeria) Nabil Anane	def.	(Scotland) Nico Carrillo	TKO (punches)	1	2:35	ONE 170	
5	(Iran) Abolfazl Alipourandi	def.	(England) Liam Nolan	KO (head kick)	1	0:59	ONE Fight Night 31	

=== 2025 Submission of the Year ===
#				Method	Round	Time	Event	Ref.
1	(Australia) Lachlan Giles	def.	(Brazil) Marcelo Garcia	Submission (kneebar)	1	7:03	ONE Fight Night 38	
2	(Russia) Mansur Malachiev	def.	(United States) Jarred Brooks	Technical Submission (north-south choke)	2	2:09	ONE Fight Night 36	
3	(United States) Tye Ruotolo	def.	(United States) Adrian Lee	Submission (rear-naked choke)	2	4:14	ONE Fight Night 35	
4	(Mongolia) Enkh-Orgil Baatarkhuu	def.	(Brazil) Fabrício Andrade	Submission (rear-naked choke)	4	1:33	ONE Fight Night 38	
5	(Uzbekistan) Avazbek Kholmirzaev	def.	(South Africa) Willie Van Rooyen	Submission (armbar)	1	3:52	ONE Fight Night 37	

=== 2025 Moments of the Year ===
#				Method	Round	Time	Event	Ref.
1	(Japan) Masaaki Noiri	def.	(Thailand) Tawanchai P.K.Saenchai	TKO (punches)	3	1:55	ONE 172	
2	(Mongolia) Enkh-Orgil Baatarkhuu	def.	(Brazil) Fabrício Andrade	Submission (rear-naked choke)	4	1:33	ONE Fight Night 38	
3	(Thailand) Rodtang Jitmuangnon	def.	(Japan) Takeru Segawa	KO (punch)	1	1:20	ONE 172	
4	(Philippines) Joshua Pacio	def.	(United States) Jarred Brooks	TKO (punches)	2	4:22	ONE 171	
5	(China) Liu Mengyang	def.	(Thailand) Tawanchai P.K.Saenchai	TKO (leg injury)	1	0:52	ONE Friday Fights 137	

== Title fights ==
Title fights in 2025
Weight class				Method	Round	Time	Event	Notes
Women's Atomweight	Denice Zamboanga	def.	Alyona Rassohyna	TKO (elbows and punches)	2	4:47	ONE Fight Night 27	(Note: For the interim ONE Women's Atomweight World Championship.)
Bantamweight	Fabrício Andrade (c)	def.	Kwon Won-il	TKO (punch to the body)	1	0:42	ONE 170	(Note: For the ONE Bantamweight World Championship.)
Bantamweight Muay Thai	Nabil Anane	def.	Nico Carrillo	TKO (punches)	1	2:35	ONE 170	(Note: For the interim ONE Bantamweight Muay Thai World Championship.)
Featherweight Muay Thai	Tawanchai P.K.Saenchai (c)	def.	Superbon Singha Mawynn	TKO (punches)	2	1:10	ONE 170	(Note: For the ONE Featherweight Muay Thai World Championship.)
Strawweight Muay Thai	Prajanchai P.K.Saenchai (c)	def.	Ellis Badr Barboza	TKO (doctor stoppage)	4	1:55	ONE Fight Night 28	(Note: For the ONE Strawweight Muay Thai World Championship.)
Strawweight	Joshua Pacio (c)	def.	Jarred Brooks (ic)	TKO (punches)	2	4:22	ONE 171	(Note: For the ONE Strawweight World Championship.)
Bantamweight Kickboxing	Jonathan Haggerty (c)	def.	Wei Rui	Decision (unanimous)	5	3:00	ONE 171	(Note: For the ONE Bantamweight Kickboxing World Championship.)
Women's Atomweight Muay Thai	Allycia Rodrigues (c)	def.	Marie McManamon	TKO (doctor stoppage)	4	3:00	ONE Fight Night 29	(Note: For the ONE Women's Atomweight Muay Thai World Championship.)
Flyweight	Yuya Wakamatsu	def.	Adriano Moraes	TKO (punches)	1	3:39	ONE 172	(Note: For the vacant ONE Flyweight World Championship.)
Women's Atomweight Kickboxing	Phetjeeja Lukjaoporongtom (c)	def.	Kana Morimoto	Decision (unanimous)	5	3:00	ONE 172	(Note: For the ONE Women's Atomweight Kickboxing World Championship.)
Strawweight Kickboxing	Jonathan Di Bella	def.	Sam-A Gaiyanghadao	Decision (unanimous)	5	3:00	ONE 172	(Note: For the interim ONE Strawweight Kickboxing World Championship.)
Featherweight Kickboxing	Masaaki Noiri	def.	Tawanchai P.K.Saenchai	TKO (punches)	3	1:55	ONE 172	(Note: For the interim ONE Featherweight Kickboxing World Championship.)
Lightweight Kickboxing	Regian Eersel	def.	Alexis Nicolas	Decision (majority)	5	3:00	ONE Fight Night 30	(Note: For the vacant ONE Lightweight Kickboxing World Championship. Eersel missed weight (170.5 lb) and was stripped of the title, and Nicolas was eligible win the title.)
Heavyweight Muay Thai	Roman Kryklia (c)	def.	Lyndon Knowles	KO (punch)	1	2:10	ONE Fight Night 30	(Note: For the ONE Heavyweight Muay Thai World Championship.)
Welterweight Submission Grappling	Tye Ruotolo (c)	def.	Dante Leon	Decision (unanimous)	1	10:00	ONE Fight Night 31	(Note: For the ONE Welterweight Submission Grappling World Championship.)
Women's Atomweight Muay Thai	Allycia Rodrigues (c)	def.	Johanna Persson	KO (punches)	3	0:59	ONE Fight Night 33	(Note: For the ONE Women's Atomweight Muay Thai World Championship.)
Lightweight Muay Thai	Regian Eersel (c)	def.	George Jarvis	KO (punches)	1	1:24	ONE Fight Night 34	(Note: For the ONE Lightweight Muay Thai World Championship.)
Women's Strawweight Muay Thai	Stella Hemetsberger	def.	Jackie Buntan	Decision (unanimous)	5	3:00	ONE Fight Night 35	(Note: For the vacant ONE Women's Strawweight Muay Thai World Championship.)
Strawweight Kickboxing	Jonathan Di Bella (ic)	def.	Prajanchai P.K.Saenchai (c)	Decision (unanimous)	5	3:00	ONE Fight Night 36	(Note: For the ONE Strawweight Kickboxing World Championship)
Heavyweight Kickboxing	Samet Agdeve	def.	Roman Kryklia	Decision (unanimous)	5	3:00	ONE Fight Night 37	(Note: For the inaugural ONE Heavyweight Kickboxing World Championship.)
Featherweight Kickboxing	Superbon Singha Mawynn (c)	def.	Masaaki Noiri (ic)	Decision (unanimous)	5	3:00	ONE 173	(Note: For the ONE Featherweight Kickboxing World Championship.)
Flyweight	Yuya Wakamatsu (c)	def.	Joshua Pacio	TKO (knees)	2	0:54	ONE 173	(Note: For the ONE Flyweight World Championship.)
Lightweight	Christian Lee (c)	def.	Alibeg Rasulov	TKO (knees)	2	2:32	ONE 173	(Note: For the ONE Lightweight World Championship.)
Atomweight Muay Thai	Nadaka Yoshinari	def.	Numsurin Chor.Ketwina	Decision (unanimous)	5	3:00	ONE 173	(Note: For the inaugural ONE Atomweight Muay Thai World Championship.)
Flyweight Submission Grappling	Diogo Reis	def.	Daiki Yonekura	Decision (unanimous)	1	10:00	ONE Fight Night 38	(Note: For the vacant ONE Flyweight Submission Grappling World Championship.)
Bantamweight	Enkh-Orgil Baatarkhuu	def.	Fabrício Andrade (c)	Submission (rear-naked choke)	4	1:33	ONE Fight Night 38	(Note: For the ONE Bantamweight World Championship.)

== ONE Friday Fights 93 ==
ONE Friday Fights 93: Kongchai vs. Ondash
- Promotion: ONE Championship
- Date: January 10, 2025
- Venue: Lumpinee Boxing Stadium
- City: Bangkok, Thailand

ONE Friday Fights 93: Kongchai vs. Ondash (also known as ONE Lumpinee 93) was a combat sports event produced by ONE Championship that took place on January 10, 2025, at Lumpinee Boxing Stadium in Bangkok, Thailand.

=== Background ===
A strawweight Muay Thai bout between Kongchai Chanaidonmuang and Ramadan Ondash was headlined the event.

=== Bonus awards ===
The following fighters received $10,000 bonuses:

- Performance of the Night: Thway Lin Htet, Rocky Wor.Wantawee, Abdallah Ondash and Haruyuki Tanitsu

=== Results ===
ONE Friday Fights 93 (YouTube / Watch ONE)
Weight Class				Method	Round	Time	Notes
Strawweight Muay Thai	(Lebanon) Ramadan Ondash	def.	(Thailand) Kongchai Chanaidonmuang	Decision (unanimous)	3	3:00	
Catchweight (142 lbs) Muay Thai	(Turkey) Şoner Şen	def.	(Thailand) Worapon Sor.Dechapan	Decision (unanimous)	3	3:00	
Catchweight (130 lbs) Muay Thai	(Thailand) Satangthong Chor.Hapayak	def.	(Thailand) Maemmot Sor.Salacheep	Decision (majority)	3	3:00	
Stawweight Muay Thai	(Myanmar) Thway Lin Htet	def.	(Thailand) Yodkitti FiatPathum	KO (punch)	1	2:39	
Catchweight (127 lbs) Muay Thai	(Thailand) Rocky Wor.Wantawee	def.	(Thailand) Chalie Singha Mawynn	KO (punches)	2	0:33	
Atomweight Muay Thai	(Thailand) Petninmungkorn Dr.RatNamkangIceland	def.	(Malaysia) Rifdean Masdor	Decision (majority)	3	3:00	
Catchweight (126 lbs) Muay Thai	(Lebanon) Abdallah Ondash	def.	(Thailand) Petlamphun Muadablampang	KO (punch to the body)	2	1:07	
Catchweight (118 lbs) Muay Thai	(Thailand) Tahaneak Nayokatasala	def.	(Ukraine) Andrii Mezentsev	Decision (split)	3	3:00	
Catchweight (101 lbs) Muay Thai	(Philippines) Islay Erika Bomogao	def.	(China) Ran Longshu	Decision (unanimous)	3	3:00	
Catchweight (120 lbs) Muay Thai	(Japan) Haruyuki Tanitsu	def.	(Thailand) Thailandlek Sor.Rungsak	KO (punch to the body)	1	1:49	
Catchweight (176 lbs) MMA	(Turkey) Dzhabir Dzhabrailov	def.	(Uzbekistan) Khusan Urakov	TKO (slam and punches)	1	0:47	
Featherweight MMA	(Russia) Nachyn Sat	def.	(South Korea) Oh Su-huan	Submission (rear-naked choke)	3	3:42	

== ONE Friday Fights 94 ==
ONE Friday Fights 94: Puengluang vs. Guluzada
- Promotion: ONE Championship
- Date: January 17, 2025
- Venue: Lumpinee Boxing Stadium
- City: Bangkok, Thailand

ONE Friday Fights 94: Puengluang vs. Guluzada (also known as ONE Lumpinee 94) was a combat sports event produced by ONE Championship that took place on January 17, 2025, at Lumpinee Boxing Stadium in Bangkok, Thailand.

=== Background ===
A flyweight Muay Thai bout between Puengluang Banrambaa and Akif Guluzada was headlined the event.

=== Bonus awards ===
The following fighters received $10,000 bonuses:

- Performance of the Night: Akif Guluzada, Kritpet P.K.Saenchai, Kunsuek Mor.Krungthepthonburi, Petnaya BangsaenFightclub and Pentor SP.Kansart Paeminburi

=== Results ===
ONE Friday Fights 94 (YouTube / Watch ONE)
Weight Class				Method	Round	Time	Notes
Flyweight Muay Thai	(Azerbaijan) Akif Guluzada	def.	(Thailand) Puengluang Banrambaa	KO (spinning back elbow)	2	1:17	
Catchweight (122 lbs) Muay Thai	(Thailand) Pichitchai P.K.Saenchai	def.	(Thailand) Petpairin Sor.Jor.Tongprachin	Decision (unanimous)	3	3:00	
Catchweight (126 lbs) Muay Thai	(Thailand) Kritpet P.K.Saenchai	def.	(Thailand) Susuek TC.MuayThai	KO (punch)	1	1:54	
Catchweight (113 lbs) Muay Thai	(Thailand) Kunsuek Mor.Krungthepthonburi	def.	(Thailand) Kongburapha Thiptamai	KO (punches)	3	1:18	
Catchweight (116 lbs) Muay Thai	(Thailand) Petnaya BangsaenFightclub	def.	(Thailand) Yoddoi Kaewsamrit	KO (punch)	1	2:33	
Catchweight (113 lbs) Muay Thai	(Thailand) Hern N.F.Looksuan	def.	(Thailand) Hinlekfai Samchaiwisetsuk	KO (body kick)	1	1:21	
Catchweight (143 lbs) Muay Thai	(Thailand) Pentor SP.Kansart Paeminburi	def.	(England) Otis Waghorn	KO (head kick)	3	2:03	
Women's Strawweight Muay Thai	(Russia) Natalia Diachkova	def.	(Canada) Taylor McClatchie	Decision (unanimous)	3	3:00	
Strawweight Muay Thai	(Iraq) Ayad Albadr	def.	(Japan) Banna Hayashi	Decision (unanimous)	3	3:00	
Featherweight MMA	(Kyrgyzstan) Erzhan Zhanyshbek Uulu	def.	(Russia) Ramazan Karimov	Decision (split)	3	5:00	
Flyweight MMA	(Philippines) Jean Claude Saclag	def.	(Indonesia) Fajar	TKO (punches)	1	3:37	

== ONE Friday Fights 95 ==
ONE Friday Fights 95: Yodlekpet vs. Jaosuayai
- Promotion: ONE Championship
- Date: January 31, 2025
- Venue: Lumpinee Boxing Stadium
- City: Bangkok, Thailand

ONE Friday Fights 95: Yodlekpet vs. Jaosuayai (also known as ONE Lumpinee 95) was an upcoming combat sports event produced by ONE Championship that took place on January 31, 2025, at Lumpinee Boxing Stadium in Bangkok, Thailand.

=== Background ===
A flyweight Muay Thai bout between Yodlekpet Or.Atchariya and Jaosuayai Mor.Krungthepthonburi was headlined the event.

=== Bonus awards ===
The following fighters received $10,000 bonuses:

- Performance of the Night: Jaosuayai Mor.Krungthepthonburi, Chalamdam Sor.boonmeerit, Padejsuk N.F.Looksuan, Jaroenporn TaiKubon, Kiamran Nabati, Eh Mwi and Robson De Oliveira

=== Results ===
ONE Friday Fights 95 (YouTube / Watch ONE)
Weight Class				Method	Round	Time	Notes
Flyweight Muay Thai	(Thailand) Jaosuayai Mor.Krungthepthonburi	def.	(Thailand) Yodlekpet Or.Atchariya	KO (punches)	2	1:35	
Strawweight Muay Thai	(Thailand) Chalamdam Sor.Boonmeerit	def.	(Thailand) Pataknin SinbiMuayThai	TKO (leg kicks)	1	2:24	
Catchweight (137 lbs) Muay Thai	(Thailand) Samingdam N.F.Looksuan	def.	(Myanmar) Moe Htet Aung	Decision (unanimous)	3	3:00	
Catchweight (140 lbs) Muay Thai	(Myanmar) Super Yay Chan	def.	(Thailand) Dunk Lukporphrayasua	KO (punches)	1	2:46	
Catchweight (122 lbs) Muay Thai	(Thailand) Padejsuk N.F.Looksuan	def.	(Russia) Danila Vasilikhin	TKO (knees)	2	2:10	
Catchweight (117 lbs) Muay Thai	(Thailand) Jaroenporn TaiKubon	def.	(Thailand) Fahjarat Sor.Dechapan	KO (punch)	2	1:48	
Bantamweight Muay Thai	(Russia) Kiamran Nabati	vs.	(Thailand) Ferrari Fairtex	NC (overturned)	1	1:56	Originally a KO (punch) win for Nabati; overturned after both fighters tested positive for banned substances.
Lightweight Muay Thai	(Iraq) Mustafa Al-Tekreeti	def.	(Russia) Eduard Saik	Decision (unanimous)	3	3:00	
Catchweight (138 lbs) Muay Thai	(Myanmar) Eh Mwi	def.	(Japan) Muga Seto	KO (punch)	2	0:41	
Women's Atomweight Kickboxing	(Japan) Kana Morimoto	def.	(Sweden) Moa Carlsson	Decision (unanimous)	3	3:00	
Strawweight MMA	(Brazil) Robson de Oliveira	def.	(Japan) Kohei Wakabayashi	Submission (rear-naked choke)	1	3:27	

== ONE Friday Fights 96 ==
ONE Friday Fights 96: Komawut vs. Panrit 2
- Promotion: ONE Championship
- Date: February 7, 2025
- Venue: Lumpinee Boxing Stadium
- City: Bangkok, Thailand

ONE Friday Fights 96: Komawut vs. Panrit 2 (also known as ONE Lumpinee 96) was a combat sports event produced by ONE Championship that took place on February 7, 2025, at Lumpinee Boxing Stadium in Bangkok, Thailand.

=== Background ===
A 142-pounds Muay Thai rematch between Komawut FA.Group and Panrit Lukjaomaesaiwaree was headlined the event. The pairing previously met at ONE Friday Fights 29 in August 2023, which Komawut win by majority decision.

=== Bonus awards ===
The following fighters received $10,000 bonuses:

- Performance of the Night: Komawut FA.Group, Donking Yotharakmuaythai, Singtanawat Nokjeanladkrabang, Nahyan Mohammed, Abdulla Dayakaev and Hyu Iwata

=== Results ===
ONE Friday Fights 96 (YouTube / Watch ONE)
Weight Class				Method	Round	Time	Notes
Catchweight (142 lbs) Muay Thai	(Thailand) Komawut FA.Group	def.	(Thailand) Panrit Lukjaomaesaiwaree	KO (punches)	2	0:46	
Catchweight (128 lbs) Muay Thai	(Thailand) Singdomthong Nokjeanladkrabang	def.	(Thailand) Nuapet Tded99	Decision (unanimous)	3	3:00	
Flyweight Muay Thai	(Thailand) Donking Yotharakmuaythai	def.	(Thailand) Denpayak Detpetsrithong	KO (punches)	1	2:07	
Catchweight (126 lbs) Muay Thai	(Thailand) Singtanawat Nokjeanladkrabang	def.	(Thailand) Brazil M-Eakchat	TKO (punches)	2	1:22	
Catchweight (122 lbs) Muay Thai	(France) Nahyan Mohammed	def.	(Thailand) Petnoppadet Noppadetmuaythai	KO (punches)	1	0:50	
Catchweight (128 lbs) Muay Thai	(Thailand) Tuangsap Sor.Salacheep	def.	(Thailand) Khunkrai P.K.Saenchai	Decision (unanimous)	3	3:00	
Bantamweight Muay Thai	(Russia) Abdulla Dayakaev	def.	(Italy) Alessio Malatesta	KO (punch to the body)	1	2:37	
Catchweight (122 lbs) Muay Thai	(Thailand) Kaenpitak NhongBangsai	def.	(Laos) Petnamkhong Mongkolpet	Decision (split)	3	3:00	
Flyweight Kickboxing	(Japan) Hyu Iwata	def.	(Portugal) Leandro Miranda	TKO (knees and punches)	2	0:42	
Catchweight (127 lbs) Muay Thai	(Democratic Republic of the Congo) Maxime Combes	def.	(France) Enzo Clarisse	Decision (unanimous)	3	3:00	
Catchweight (122 lbs) Kickboxing	(Japan) Ryuki Kawano	def.	(China) Wang Yuhan	Decision (unanimous)	3	3:00	
Lightweight MMA	(Brazil) Jean Carlos Pereira	def.	(Russia) Mansur Gitinov	Technical Submission (armbar)	1	5:00	

== ONE Friday Fights 97 ==
ONE Friday Fights 97: Kongsuk vs. Lamnamoonlek
- Promotion: ONE Championship
- Date: February 14, 2025
- Venue: Lumpinee Boxing Stadium
- City: Bangkok, Thailand

ONE Friday Fights 97: Kongsuk vs. Lamnamoonlek (also known as ONE Lumpinee 97) was a combat sports event produced by ONE Championship that took place on February 14, 2025, at Lumpinee Boxing Stadium in Bangkok, Thailand.

=== Background ===
A 138-pounds Muay Thai bout between Kongsuk Fairtex and Lamnamoonlek Or.Atchariya was headlined the event.

=== Bonus awards ===
The following fighters received $10,000 bonuses:

- Performance of the Night: Francisca Vera, Vero Nika, Khunponnoi Sor.Sommai, Tomioka Yusei and Jayson Miralpez

=== Results ===
ONE Friday Fights 97 (YouTube / Watch ONE)
Weight Class				Method	Round	Time	Notes
Catchweight (138 lbs) Muay Thai	(Thailand) Kongsuk Fairtex	def.	(Thailand) Lamnamoonlek Or.Atchariya	Decision (split)	3	3:00	
Lightweight Muay Thai	(Russia) Dmitry Menshikov	vs.	(Thailand) Tengnueng Fairtex	NC (overturned)	1	2:59	Originally a KO (punches) win for Menshikov; overturned after he tested positive for banned substances.
Catchweight (126 lbs) Muay Thai	(Thailand) Kompetch Fairtex	def.	(Thailand) Theptaksin Sor.Sornsing	Decision (unanimous)	3	3:00	
Catchweight (130 lbs) Muay Thai	(Thailand) Tomyamkoong Bhumjaithai	def.	(Thailand) Denkriangkrai Singha Mawynn	Decision (unanimous)	3	3:00	
Catchweight (119 lbs) Muay Thai	(Thailand) Tonglampoon FA.Group	def.	(Thailand) Mungkorn Boomdeksean	Decision (split)	3	3:00	
Catchweight (113 lbs) Muay Thai	(Thailand) Nittikorn JP.Power	def.	(Thailand) Chatpichit Sor.Sor.Toipadriew	Decision (unanimous)	3	3:00	
Women's Atomweight Muay Thai	(Chile) Francisca Vera	def.	(Myanmar) Vero Nika	Decision (split)	3	3:00	
Flyweight Muay Thai	(Thailand) Khunponnoi Sor.Sommai	def.	(Thailand) Chartmungkorn Chor.Hapayak	KO (punch)	2	0:12	
Women's Atomweight Muay Thai	(Thailand) Junior Fairtex	def.	(Hong Kong) Emily Chong	Decision (unanimous)	3	3:00	
Catchweight (129 lbs) Muay Thai	(Japan) Tomioka Yusei	def.	(Thailand) Grandprixnoi P.K.Saenchai	TKO (punches to the body)	1	1:12	
Strawweight MMA	(Philippines) Jayson Miralpez	def.	(Japan) Ryuya Hatakeyama	KO (punches)	1	3:34	

== ONE Friday Fights 98 ==
ONE Friday Fights 98: Chartpayak vs. Kongchai
- Promotion: ONE Championship
- Date: February 28, 2025
- Venue: Lumpinee Boxing Stadium
- City: Bangkok, Thailand

ONE Friday Fights 98: Chartpayak vs. Kongchai (also known as ONE Lumpinee 98) was a combat sports event produced by ONE Championship that took place on February 28, 2025, at Lumpinee Boxing Stadium in Bangkok, Thailand.

=== Background ===
A strawweight Muay Thai bout between Chartpayak Saksatoon and Kongchai Chanaidonmuang was headlined the event.

=== Bonus awards ===
The following fighters received $10,000 bonuses:

- Performance of the Night: Chabakaew Sor.Kanjanchai, Nongbia LaoLaneXang and Issei Yonaha

=== Results ===
ONE Friday Fights 98 (YouTube / Watch ONE)
Weight Class				Method	Round	Time	Notes
Strawweight Muay Thai	(Thailand) Chartpayak Saksatoon	def.	(Thailand) Kongchai Chanaidonmuang	Decision (unanimous)	3	3:00	
Catchweight (142 lbs) Muay Thai	(Belarus) Antar Kacem	def.	(Thailand) Krisana Daodenmuaythai	Decision (split)	3	3:00	
Flyweight Muay Thai	(Myanmar) Sonrak Fairtex	def.	(France) Joachim Ouraghi	Decision (unanimous)	3	3:00	
Catchweight (119 lbs) Muay Thai	(Thailand) Paeyim Sor.Boonmeerit	def.	(Thailand) Teeyai P.K.Saenchai	Decision (split)	3	3:00	
Catchweight (132 lbs) Muay Thai	(Laos) Nong-Oh LaoLaneXang	def.	(Thailand) Khundet P.K.Saenchai	KO (punch)	2	0:24	
Catchweight (106 lbs) Muay Thai	(Thailand) Chabakaew Sor.Kanjanchai	def.	(Thailand) Gusjung Fairtex	KO (punch)	3	1:07	
Flyweight Muay Thai	(Russia) Asadula Imangazaliev	def.	(Morocco) Mohamed Taoufyq	Decision (unanimous)	3	3:00	
Atomweight Muay Thai	(Laos) Nongbia LaoLaneXang	def.	(Germany) Marvin Dittrich	KO (punch)	1	0:53	
Flyweight Muay Thai	(Thailand) Seksan Fairtex	def.	(China) Zhang Jinhu	Decision (unanimous)	3	3:00	
Catchweight (122 lbs) Muay Thai	(Japan) Issei Yonaha	def.	(China) Lu Yifu	KO (punches)	2	2:41	
Catchweight (128 lbs) MMA	(Uzbekistan) Avazbek Kholmirzaev	def.	(Kazakhstan) Bolat Zamanbekov	Submission (guillotine choke)	1	1:31	
Lightweight MMA	(England) Connor Tymon	def.	(India) Sumit Bhyan	TKO (punches)	2	0:46	

== ONE Friday Fights 99 ==
ONE Friday Fights 99: Yod-IQ vs. Morari
- Promotion: ONE Championship
- Date: March 7, 2025
- Venue: Lumpinee Boxing Stadium
- City: Bangkok, Thailand

ONE Friday Fights 99: Yod-IQ vs. Morari (also known as ONE Lumpinee 99) was a combat sports event produced by ONE Championship that took place on March 7, 2025, at Lumpinee Boxing Stadium in Bangkok, Thailand.

=== Background ===
A bantamweight Muay Thai bout between Yod-IQ Or.Pimonsri and Petru Morari was headlined the event.

=== Bonus awards ===
The following fighters received $10,000 bonuses:

- Performance of the Night: Lamsing Sor.Dechapan, Wuttikrai Wor.Chakrawut, Haruyuki Tanitsu and Ivan Gnizditskiy

=== Results ===
ONE Friday Fights 99 (YouTube / Watch ONE)
Weight Class				Method	Round	Time	Notes
Bantamweight Muay Thai	(Thailand) Yod-IQ Or.Pimolsri	def.	(Moldova) Petru Morari	Decision (unanimous)	3	3:00	
Catchweight (128 lbs) Muay Thai	(Thailand) Lamsing Sor.Dechapan	def.	(Thailand) Ngaopayak Adsanpatong	TKO (punch)	2	1:34	
Catchweight (130 lbs) Muay Thai	(Thailand) Sirichok Sor.Sommai	def.	(Thailand) Lothong Kruaynaimuanggym	Decision (split)	3	3:00	
Flyweight Muay Thai	(Thailand) Wuttikrai Wor.Chakrawut	def.	(Thailand) Changthong M.U.Den	KO (head kick)	3	0:24	
Atomweight Muay Thai	(Thailand) Chathai BangsaenFightclub	def.	(Thailand) Petmuangthai Sor.Naruemon	Decision (split)	3	3:00	
Catchweight (112 lbs) Muay Thai	(Thailand) Tangtang Sor.Dechapan	def.	(Thailand) Nongfahsai TOP P.K.Saenchai	Decision (unanimous)	3	3:00	
Catchweight (142 lbs) Muay Thai	(Thailand) Worapon Sor.Dechapan	def.	(Turkey) Şoner Şen	Decision (unanimous)	3	3:00	
Catchweight (122 lbs) Muay Thai	(Thailand) Petpattaya Silkmuaythai	def.	(Japan) Ikko Ota	Decision (unanimous)	3	3:00	
Catchweight (117 lbs) Muay Thai	(Japan) Haruyuki Tanitsu	def.	(Myanmar) Thet Paing Aung	KO (punches)	2	2:27	
Women's Strawweight Kickboxing	(Austria) Stella Hemetsberger	def.	(Italy) Anna Lia Moretti	Decision (unanimous)	3	3:00	
Middleweight MMA	(Russia) Ivan Gnizditskiy	def.	(United States) Kevin Church	TKO (punches)	1	2:46	
Lightweight MMA	(Sweden) Oliver Axelsson	def.	(Australia) Antonio Mammarella	Decision (unanimous)	3	5:00	

== ONE Friday Fights 100 ==
ONE Friday Fights 100: Muangthai vs. Abdulmedzhidov
- Promotion: ONE Championship
- Date: March 14, 2025
- Venue: Lumpinee Boxing Stadium
- City: Bangkok, Thailand

ONE Friday Fights 100: Muangthai vs. Abdulmedzhidov (also known as ONE Lumpinee 100) was a combat sports event produced by ONE Championship that took place on March 14, 2025, at Lumpinee Boxing Stadium in Bangkok, Thailand.

=== Background ===
A 137-pounds Muay Thai bout between Muangthai P.K.Saenchai and Ibragim Abdulmedzhidov was headlined the event.

=== Bonus awards ===
The following fighters received bonuses:

- Performance of the Night ($50,000): Nieky Holzken
- Performance of the Night ($10,000): Muangthai P.K.Saenchai, Suakim Sor.Jor.Tongprajin, Jaosuayai Mor.Krungthepthonburi, Shadow Singha Mawynn and Jang Seong-gyu

=== Results ===
ONE Friday Fights 100 (YouTube / Watch ONE)
Weight Class				Method	Round	Time	Notes
Catchweight (137 lbs) Muay Thai	(Thailand) Muangthai P.K.Saenchai	def.	(Russia) Ibragim Abdulmedzhidov	TKO (retirement)	3	1:06	
Catchweight (175 lbs) Kickboxing	(Netherlands) Nieky Holzken	def.	(Thailand) Sinsamut Klinmee	KO (punch)	1	1:58	
Catchweight (140 lbs) Muay Thai	(Thailand) Suakim Sor.Jor.Tongprajin	def.	(Thailand) Komawut FA.Group	TKO (elbows)	2	0:30	
Flyweight Muay Thai	(Thailand) Jaosuayai Mor.Krungthepthonburi	def.	(Bosnia and Herzegovina) Denis Purić	KO (body kick)	2	1:37	
Flyweight Muay Thai	(Thailand) Panpayak Jitmuangnon	def.	(Iran) Majid Seydali	TKO (arm injury)	3	2:17	
Featherweight Muay Thai	(Thailand) Shadow Singha Mawynn	def.	(Iran) Hassan Vahdanirad	KO (elbow)	2	2:51	
Catchweight (140 lbs) Kickboxing	(Thailand) Sangarthit Looksaikongdin	def.	(Myanmar) Super Yay Chan	Decision (unanimous)	3	3:00	
Catchweight (130 lbs) Muay Thai	(Scotland) Stephen Irvine	def.	(Thailand) Sornsueknoi FA.Group	Decision (unanimous)	3	3:00	
Catchweight (116 lbs) Muay Thai	(Thailand) Songchainoi Kiatsongrit	def.	(Thailand) Teeyai Wankhongohm MBK	Decision (unanimous)	3	3:00	
Women's Atomweight MMA	(China) Xiong Jing Nan	def.	(China) Meng Bo	Decision (unanimous)	3	5:00	Xiong missed weight (117.6 lb).
Catchweight (140 lbs) Muay Thai	(Turkey) Ali Koyuncu	def.	(Japan) Yota Shigemori	Decision (unanimous)	3	3:00	
Bantamweight MMA	(South Korea) Jang Seong-gyu	def.	(Japan) Katsuaki Aoyagi	KO (punch to the body)	3	1:07	

== ONE Friday Fights 101 ==
ONE Friday Fights 101: Nakrob vs. Puengluang
- Promotion: ONE Championship
- Date: March 21, 2025
- Venue: Lumpinee Boxing Stadium
- City: Bangkok, Thailand

ONE Friday Fights 101: Nakrob vs. Puengluang (also known as ONE Lumpinee 101) was a combat sports event produced by ONE Championship that took place on March 21, 2025, at Lumpinee Boxing Stadium in Bangkok, Thailand.

=== Background ===
A flyweight Muay Thai bout between Nakrob Fairtex and Puengluang Banrambaa was headlined the event.

=== Bonus awards ===
The following fighters received $10,000 bonuses:

- Performance of the Night: Nakrob Fairtex, Chokpreecha P.K.Saenchai, Khunsuek Superbon Training Camp and Carlos Alvarez

=== Results ===
ONE Friday Fights 101 (YouTube / Watch ONE)
Weight Class				Method	Round	Time	Notes
Flyweight Muay Thai	(Thailand) Nakrob Fairtex	def.	(Thailand) Puengluang Banrambaa	KO (punch)	2	1:22	
Strawweight Muay Thai	(Thailand) Chokpreecha P.K.Saenchai	def.	(Thailand) Chalamdam Sor.Boonmeerit	KO (punches)	2	1:23	
Featherweight Muay Thai	(Thailand) Khunsuek Superbon Training Camp	def.	(Uzbekistan) G'Anijonov Muhlisbek	KO (punch)	3	0:21	
Catchweight (140 lbs) Muay Thai	(Thailand) Petwichit Singha Mawynn	def.	(Thailand) Yok Sit.Sorros	Decision (unanimous)	3	3:00	
Catchweight (118 lbs) Muay Thai	(Thailand) Numsurin Chor.Ketwina	def.	(Thailand) Sunday Boomdeksean	Decision (unanimous)	3	3:00	
Strawweight Muay Thai	(Myanmar) Thway Lin Htet	def.	(Thailand) Rocky Wor.Wantawee	Decision (unanimous)	3	3:00	
Flyweight Muay Thai	(Israel) Ahavat Gordon	def.	(Myanmar) Eh Mwi	Decision (unanimous)	3	3:00	
Catchweight (122 lbs) Kickboxing	(France) Enzo Clarisse	def.	(Japan) Rui Kakizaki	Decision (split)	3	3:00	
Catchweight (119 lbs) Muay Thai	(Brazil) Dionatha Santos Tobias	def.	(Laos) Kongpoxay LaoLaneXang	KO (punch to the body)	1	2:34	
Catchweight (120 lbs) Muay Thai	(Turkey) Nefise Delikurt	def.	(Brazil) Gabrielle Moram	Decision (split)	3	3:00	
Featherweight MMA	(Philippines) Carlos Alvarez	def.	(Japan) Seiya Matsuda	Submission (anaconda choke)	1	0:17	
Strawweight MMA	(India) Monjit Yein	def.	(Philippines) Justin Jones Matoto	Decision (unanimous)	3	5:00	

== ONE Friday Fights 102 (Canceled) ==
ONE Friday Fights 102: Rambong vs. Pompet
- Promotion: ONE Championship
- Date: March 28, 2025
- Venue: Lumpinee Boxing Stadium
- City: Bangkok, Thailand

ONE Friday Fights 102: Rambong vs. Pompet (also known as ONE Lumpinee 102) was a planned combat sports event produced by ONE Championship originally planned to take place on March 28, 2025, at Lumpinee Boxing Stadium in Bangkok, Thailand. Due to the 2025 Sagaing earthquake and its effects to Bangkok in afternoon, the event has been canceled on same day before the event started.

=== background ===
A 130-pounds Muay Thai bout between Rambong Sor.Therapat and Pompet Panthonggym was scheduled to headline the event.

=== Bonus awards ===
The following fighters received $10,000 bonuses:

=== Cancelled fight card ===
ONE Friday Fights 102 (YouTube / Watch ONE)
Weight Class				Method	Round	Time	Notes
Catchweight (130 lbs) Muay Thai	(Thailand) Rambong Sor.Therapat	vs.	(Thailand) Pompet Panthonggym				
Flyweight Muay Thai	(Thailand) Dedduanglek Wankhongohm MBK	vs.	(Thailand) Pettonglor Sitluangpeenumfon				
Catchweight (136 lbs) Muay Thai	(Thailand) Korpai Sor. Yingcharoenkarnchang	vs.	(Thailand) Jaopuenyai Kiatkongkreangkrai				
Catchweight (129 lbs) Muay Thai	(Thailand) Rocky Kangaroo Muaythai	vs.	(China) Tang Qiqin				
Atomweight Muay Thai	(Thailand) Nehramit Annymuaythai	vs.	(Thailand) Petpasak Sor.Salacheep				
Catchweight (127 lbs) Muay Thai	(Thailand) Khunpon Or.AudUdon	vs.	(Thailand) Kraithong P.U.Phabai				
Catchweight (103 lbs) Muay Thai	(Philippines) Islay Erika Bomogao	vs.	(Spain) Nerea Rubio				
Catchweight (160 lbs) Muay Thai	(Scotland) Rudy Da Silva	vs.	(Azerbaijan) Kenan Bayramov				
Catchweight (126 lbs) Muay Thai	(Spain) Pol Pascual	vs.	(Japan) Takuma Ota				
Strawweight Kickboxing	(China) Liu Junchao	vs.	(Japan) Akito Nakashima				
Strawweight MMA	(Philippines) Marwin Quirante	vs.	(Russia) Torepchi Dongak				
Flyweight MMA	(Philippines) Jean Claude Saclag	vs.	(Turkmenistan) Shazada Ataev				Ataev missed weight (136.8 lb).

== ONE Friday Fights 103 ==
ONE Friday Fights 103: Kulabdam vs. Çiçek
- Promotion: ONE Championship
- Date: April 4, 2025
- Venue: Lumpinee Boxing Stadium
- City: Bangkok, Thailand

ONE Friday Fights 103: Kulabdam vs. Çiçek (also known as ONE Lumpinee 103) was a combat sports event produced by ONE Championship that took place on April 4, 2025, at Lumpinee Boxing Stadium in Bangkok, Thailand.

=== background ===
A 147-pounds Muay Thai bout between Kulabdam Sor.Jor.Piek-U-Thai and Ferzan Çiçek was headlined the event.

=== Bonus awards ===
The following fighters received $10,000 bonuses:

- Performance of the Night: Kulabdam Sor.Jor.Piek-U-Thai, Watcharapon P.K.Saenchai, Face Erawan and Lucas Ganin

=== Results ===
ONE Friday Fights 103 (YouTube / Watch ONE)
Weight Class				Method	Round	Time	Notes
Catchweight (147 lbs) Muay Thai	(Thailand) Kulabdam Sor.Jor.Piek-U-Thai	def.	(Turkey) Ferzan Çiçek	KO (punch)	1	2:11	
Catchweight (119 lbs) Muay Thai	(Thailand) Watcharapon P.K.Saenchai	def.	(Thailand) Mungkorn Boomdeksean	KO (punch to the body)	2	1:32	
Catchweight (128 lbs) Muay Thai	(Thailand) Pansak Wor.Wantawee	def.	(Thailand) Palangboon Wor.Santai	Decision (split)	3	3:00	
Catchweight (128 lbs) Muay Thai	(Brazil) Walter Goncalves	def.	(Spain) Xavier Gonzalez	Decision (unanimous)	3	3:00	
Catchweight (113 lbs) Muay Thai	(Thailand) Hern N.F.Looksuan	def.	(Thailand) Fahjarat Sor.Dechapan	Decision (unanimous)	3	3:00	
Catchweight (119 lbs) Muay Thai	(Thailand) Suajan Sor.Isarachot	def.	(Thailand) Pettasuea Seeopal	Decision (unanimous)	3	3:00	
Bantamweight Muay Thai	(Thailand) Avatar P.K.Saenchai	def.	(United States) Kendu Irving	Decision (unanimous)	3	3:00	
Catchweight (147 lbs) Muay Thai	(France) Hakim Bah	def.	(Thailand) Boonlert Sor.Boonmeerit	KO (punch)	1	2:45	
Catchweight (123 lbs) Muay Thai	(Thailand) Face Erawan	def.	(Thailand) Yangdam Jitmuangnon	KO (punch to the body)	1	1:18	
Women's Atomweight Kickboxing	(Hong Kong) Tsz Ching Phoebe Lo	def.	(Japan) Fuyuka	Decision (unanimous)	3	3:00	
Bantamweight MMA	(Argentina) Lucas Ganin	def.	(Brazil) Harlysson Nunes	TKO (punches)	1	0:30	
Flyweight MMA	(South Africa) Edson Machavane	def.	(Philippines) Fritz Biagtan	TKO (doctor stoppage)	2	0:35	

== ONE Friday Fights 104 ==
ONE Friday Fights 104: Chartpayak vs. Kompetch 2
- Promotion: ONE Championship
- Date: April 11, 2025
- Venue: Lumpinee Boxing Stadium
- City: Bangkok, Thailand

ONE Friday Fights 104: Chartpayak vs. Kompetch 2 (also known as ONE Lumpinee 104) was a combat sports event produced by ONE Championship that took place on April 11, 2025, at Lumpinee Boxing Stadium in Bangkok, Thailand.

=== background ===
A strawweight Muay Thai rematch between Chartpayak Saksatoon and Kompetch Fairtex was headlined the event. The pairing previously met at ONE Friday Fights 86 in November 2024, which Chartpayak win by majority decision.

=== Bonus awards ===
The following fighters received $10,000 bonuses:

- Performance of the Night: Chartpayak Saksatoon, Pet Suanluangrodyok, Petninmungkorn NamkaengIceland, Stella Hemetsberger and Hiroki Naruo

=== Results ===
ONE Friday Fights 104 (YouTube / Watch ONE)
Weight Class				Method	Round	Time	Notes
Strawweight Muay Thai	(Thailand) Chartpayak Saksatoon	def.	(Thailand) Kompetch Fairtex	KO (punches)	2	0:51	
Catchweight (130 lbs) Muay Thai	(Thailand) Satangthong Chor.Hapayak	def.	(Thailand) Sanpet Sor.Salacheep	Decision (split)	3	3:00	
Catchweight (130 lbs) Muay Thai	(Thailand) Decho Por.Borirak	def.	(Thailand) Isannuea Ranongmuaythai	Decision (split)	3	3:00	
Catchweight (126 lbs) Muay Thai	(Thailand) Kritpet P.K.Saenchai	def.	(Thailand) Petlampun Muadablampang	Decision (unanimous)	3	3:00	
Catchweight (114 lbs) Muay Thai	(Thailand) Pet Suanluangrodyok	def.	(Thailand) Khunsuk Mor.Krungthepthonburi	TKO (punches)	2	2:24	
Atomweight Muay Thai	(Thailand) Petninmungkorn NamkaengIceland	def.	(Thailand) Kochasit Tasaeyasat	KO (punches)	3	0:34	
Flyweight Muay Thai	(Thailand) Khunponnoi Sor.Sommai	def.	(Myanmar) Sonrak Fairtex	Decision (split)	3	3:00	
Women's Strawweight Muay Thai	(Austria) Stella Hemetsberger	def.	(Poland) Vanessa Romanowski	KO (body kick)	1	1:44	
Featherweight Muay Thai	(Argentina) Angel Bauza	def.	(Algeria) Zohir Remidi	TKO (retirement)	1	2:42	Bauza missed weight (156.4 lb).
Catchweight (139 lbs) Kickboxing	(Japan) Hiroki Naruo	def.	(Brazil) Alber Da Silva	TKO (punches)	1	1:54	
Featherweight MMA	(Russia) Ramazan Suleymanov	def.	(Moldova) Konstantin Marareskul	Decision (split)	3	5:00	
Flyweight MMA	(Japan) Tsukasa Mizoguchi	def.	(Philippines) Ezekiel Isidro	KO (punches)	1	4:59	

== ONE Friday Fights 105 ==
ONE Friday Fights 105: Kongsuk vs. Lamnamoonlek 2
- Promotion: ONE Championship
- Date: April 18, 2025
- Venue: Lumpinee Boxing Stadium
- City: Bangkok, Thailand

ONE Friday Fights 105: Kongsuk vs. Lamnamoonlek 2 (also known as ONE Lumpinee 105) was a combat sports event produced by ONE Championship that took place on April 18, 2025, at Lumpinee Boxing Stadium in Bangkok, Thailand.

=== background ===
A 137-pounds Muay Thai rematch between Kongsuk Fairtex and Lamnamoonlek Or.Atchariya was headlined the event. The pairing previously met at ONE Friday Fights 97 in February 2025, which Kongsuk win by split decision.

=== Bonus awards ===
The following fighters received $10,000 bonuses:

- Performance of the Night: Kaotaem Fairtex, Jaradchai Maxjandee and Tezuka Shota

=== Results ===
ONE Friday Fights 105 (YouTube / Watch ONE)
Weight Class				Method	Round	Time	Notes
Catchweight (137 lbs) Muay Thai	(Thailand) Lamnamoonlek Or.Atchariya	def.	(Thailand) Kongsuk Fairtex	Decision (unanimous)	3	3:00	
Catchweight (140 lbs) Muay Thai	(Thailand) Buakhiao Por.Paoin	def.	(Poland) Jakub Poslowski	KO (knee to the body)	2	1:10	
Catchweight (129 lbs) Muay Thai	(Thailand) Kaotaem Fairtex	def.	(Thailand) Tuangthong Paesaisi	TKO (punches)	3	1:49	
Catchweight (132 lbs) Muay Thai	(Pakistan) Ubaid Hussain	def.	(Uzbekistan) Khusen Salomov	Decision (unanimous)	3	3:00	
Flyweight Muay Thai	(Thailand) Jaradchai Maxjandee	def.	(Thailand) Petwanghin Lookpayakraipakdee	KO (body kick)	1	2:01	
Catchweight (113 lbs) Muay Thai	(Thailand) Fahlikit Nayokjoyprajin	def.	(Thailand) Nuengthoranee Por.Homklin	KO (knee to the body)	3	1:57	
Featherweight Kickboxing	(Iran) Mohammad Siasarani	def.	(China) Liu Mengyang	Decision (split)	3	3:00	
Catchweight (137 lbs) Muay Thai	(Japan) Tezuka Shota	def.	(Malaysia) Riedzuan Norsyahmie	KO (punch to the body)	1	2:40	
Catchweight (122 lbs) Muay Thai	(Thailand) Maisangngern Sor.Yingcharoenkarnchang	def.	(Japan) Issei Yonaha	Decision (unanimous)	3	3:00	
Featherweight MMA	(Russia) Ivan Bondarchuk	def.	(Kyrgyzstan) Abdulgadzhi Gaziev	KO (head kick)	2	3:02	
Bantamweight Submission Grappling	(United States) Denny Sisti	def.	(Brazil) Rodrigo Marello	Submission (kneebar)	1	3:02	

== ONE Friday Fights 106 ==
ONE Friday Fights 106: Panrit vs. Suksawat
- Promotion: ONE Championship
- Date: May 2, 2025
- Venue: Lumpinee Boxing Stadium
- City: Bangkok, Thailand

ONE Friday Fights 106: Panrit vs. Suksawat (also known as ONE Lumpinee 106) was a combat sports event produced by ONE Championship that took place on May 2, 2025, at Lumpinee Boxing Stadium in Bangkok, Thailand.

=== background ===
A 140-pounds Muay Thai bout between Panrit Lukjaomaesaiwaree and Suksawat P.K.Saenchai was headlined the event.

=== Bonus awards ===
The following fighters received $10,000 bonuses:

- Performance of the Night: Panrit Lukjaomaesaiwaree, Banluelok Sitwatcharachai and Rustam Yunusov

=== Results ===
ONE Friday Fights 106 (YouTube / Watch ONE)
Weight Class				Method	Round	Time	Notes
Catchweight (140 lbs) Muay Thai	(Thailand) Panrit Lukjaomaesaiwaree	def.	(Thailand) Suksawat P.K.Saenchai	KO (punch to the body)	1	1:55	
Catchweight (113 lbs) Muay Thai	(Thailand) Banluelok Sitwatcharachai	def.	(Thailand) Petbanrai Singha Mawynn	TKO (punch)	1	2:16	
Strawweight Muay Thai	(Thailand) Suesat Manop Gym	def.	(Thailand) Chalamdam Sor.Boonmeerit	KO (leg kicks)	1	1:24	
Catchweight (128 lbs) Muay Thai	(Thailand) Petphupa Aekpujean	def.	(Thailand) Chattawee Nayokjoyprajin	Decision (unanimous)	3	3:00	
Flyweight Muay Thai	(Thailand) Yodseksan Rodsuayjajed	def.	(Myanmar) Sein Lone Chaw	Decision (unanimous)	3	3:00	
Strawweight Muay Thai	(Thailand) Khunpon Or.AudUdon	def.	(Morocco) Abdessamie Rhenimi	Decision (split)	3	3:00	
Flyweight Muay Thai	(Russia) Rustam Yunusov	def.	(England) Alfie Ponting	KO (punch and knee)	1	1:50	
Strawweight Muay Thai	(Uzbekistan) Khasan Salomov	def.	(Thailand) Payakrut Suajantokmuaythai	Decision (unanimous)	3	3:00	
Flyweight Muay Thai	(Romania) Silviu Vitez	def.	(Japan) Tomoki Sato	TKO (doctor stoppage)	2	1:57	
Flyweight MMA	(Russia) Chayan Oorzhak	def.	(Venezuela) Eubert Gomez	TKO (knees and punches)	1	3:20	
Bantamweight MMA	(Russia) Valerii Gusarov	def.	(Kazakhstan) Koshen Akanov	Submission (ninja choke)	1	2:27	
Catchweight (118 lbs) Kickboxing	(Japan) Shuri Sakayori	def.	(China) Sheng Yi Yang	Decision (split)	3	3:00	

== ONE Friday Fights 107 ==
ONE Friday Fights 107: Ortikov vs. Dedduanglek
- Promotion: ONE Championship
- Date: May 9, 2025
- Venue: Lumpinee Boxing Stadium
- City: Bangkok, Thailand

ONE Friday Fights 107: Ortikov vs. Dedduanglek (also known as ONE Lumpinee 107) was a combat sports event produced by ONE Championship that took place on May 9, 2025, at Lumpinee Boxing Stadium in Bangkok, Thailand.

=== background ===
A flyweight Muay Thai bout between Aslamjon Ortikov and Dedduanglek Wankhongohm MBK was headlined the event.

=== Bonus awards ===
The following fighters received $10,000 bonuses:

- Performance of the Night: Vero Nika, Isaac Mohammed and Norika Ryu

=== Results ===
ONE Friday Fight 107 (YouTube / Watch ONE)
Weight Class				Method	Round	Time	Notes
Flyweight Muay Thai	(Uzbekistan) Aslamjon Ortikov	def.	(Thailand) Dedduanglek Wankhongohm MBK	Decision (unanimous)	3	3:00	
Women's Atomweight Muay Thai	(Myanmar) Vero Nika	def.	(Thailand) Junior Fairtex	TKO (punches)	2	1:09	
Catchweight (127 lbs) Muay Thai	(Thailand) Pataknin Sinbimuaythai	def.	(Thailand) Singtanawat Nokjeanladkrabang	Decision (unanimous)	3	3:00	
Catchweight (140 lbs) Muay Thai	(Thailand) Saksri Superlek Muaythai	def.	(Thailand) Kayasit Por.Prachansi	Decision (unanimous)	3	3:00	
Catchweight (116 lbs) Muay Thai	(Thailand) Koko Mor.Rattanabundit	def.	(Thailand) Jaroenporn TKD Muaythai	KO (punch to the body)	2	1:41	
Catchweight (113 lbs) Muay Thai	(Thailand) Kongburapha Thiptamai	def.	(Thailand) Nittikorn JP Power	Decision (unanimous)	3	3:00	
Catchweight (112 lbs) Muay Thai	(Malaysia) Adam Sor.Dechapan	def.	(France) Nahyan Mohammed	Decision (split)	3	3:00	
Catchweight (117 lbs) Muay Thai	(France) Isaac Mohammed	def.	(Italy) Antonio Piana	TKO (punches)	2	1:37	
Catchweight (128 lbs) Muay Thai	(Japan) Hikaru Furumura	def.	(France) Kais Mohammed	KO (punches)	1	1:33	
Atomweight Muay Thai	(Malaysia) Rifdean Masdor	def.	(Laos) Nongbia LaoLaneXang	TKO (punches)	1	0:47	
Catchweight (128 lbs) MMA	(Uzbekistan) Avazbek Kholmirzaev	def.	(Brazil) Robson de Oliveira	TKO (punches)	2	3:44	
Women's Strawweight MMA	(Japan) Norika Ryu	def.	(Azerbaijan) Zemfira Alieva	Submission (triangle choke)	2	4:53	

== ONE Friday Fights 108 ==
ONE Friday Fights 108: Chokpreecha vs. Kongchai 2
- Promotion: ONE Championship
- Date: May 16, 2025
- Venue: Lumpinee Boxing Stadium
- City: Bangkok, Thailand

ONE Friday Fights 108: Chokpreecha vs. Kongchai 2 (also known as ONE Lumpinee 108) was a combat sports event produced by ONE Championship that took place on May 16, 2025, at Lumpinee Boxing Stadium in Bangkok, Thailand.

=== background ===
A strawweight Muay Thai rematch between Chokpreecha P.K.Saenchai and Kongchai Chanaidonmuang was headlined the event. The pairing previously met at ONE Friday Fights 87 in November 2024, which Kongchai win by unanimous decision.

=== Bonus awards ===
The following fighters received $10,000 bonuses:

- Performance of the Night: Kongchai Chanaidonmuang, Aekkalak Sor.Samarngarment and Tengnueng Fairtex

=== Results ===
ONE Friday Fights 108 (YouTube / Watch ONE)
Weight Class				Method	Round	Time	Notes
Strawweight Muay Thai	(Thailand) Kongchai Chanaidonmuang	def.	(Thailand) Chokpreecha P.K.Saenchai	KO (punch)	2	0:26	
Catchweight (127 lbs) Muay Thai	(Thailand) Longern Sor.Sommai	def.	(Thailand) Boonchot Sor.Boonmeerit	Decision (unanimous)	3	3:00	
Catchweight (124 lbs) Muay Thai	(Thailand) Aekkalak Sor.Samarngarment	def.	(Thailand) Songpayak JP.Power	KO (punch)	2	2:28	
Catchweight (126 lbs) Muay Thai	(Thailand) Brazil Aekmuangnon	def.	(Thailand) Lekkla BS Muaythai	Decision (unanimous)	3	3:00	
Atomweight Muay Thai	(Thailand) Petnaya NhongBangsai	def.	(Thailand) Mahesuan Aekmuangnon	Decision (unanimous)	3	3:00	
Catchweight (117 lbs) Muay Thai	(Thailand) Pet Suanluangrodyok	def.	(Thailand) Petnaruang Sor.Rungsak	KO (punches)	2	1:12	
Lightweight Muay Thai	(Thailand) Tengnueng Fairtex	def.	(Guinea) Germain Kpoghomou	KO (punch)	2	1:08	
Catchweight (122 lbs) Muay Thai	(Iran) Majid Karimi	def.	(Thailand) Kaenpitak Nhongbangsai	KO (punch to the body)	2	2:19	
Catchweight (132 lbs) Muay Thai	(Iran) Mohammad Ali	def.	(Laos) Nong-Oh LaoLaneXang	Decision (unanimous)	3	3:00	
Strawweight Kickboxing	(Japan) Akito Nakashima	def.	(China) Liu Junchao	Decision (split)	3	3:00	
Featherweight MMA	(France) Alexandre Khan	def.	(Panama) Yovanis Decroz	Submission (arm triangle choke)	2	3:55	
Welterweight MMA	(Turkey) Ruslan Arslangereev	def.	(Brazil) Bismarck Gomes	Submission (rear-naked choke)	1	0:54	

== ONE Friday Fights 109 ==
ONE Friday Fights 109: Yod-IQ vs. Delval
- Promotion: ONE Championship
- Date: May 23, 2025
- Venue: Lumpinee Boxing Stadium
- City: Bangkok, Thailand

ONE Friday Fights 109: Yod-IQ vs. Delval (also known as ONE Lumpinee 109) was a combat sports event produced by ONE Championship that took place on May 23, 2025, at Lumpinee Boxing Stadium in Bangkok, Thailand.

=== background ===
A bantamweight Muay Thai bout between Yod-IQ Or.Pimonsri and Brice Delval was headlined the event.

=== Bonus awards ===
The following fighters received $10,000 bonuses:

- Performance of the Night: Wuttikrai Wor.Chakrawut, Chama Superbon Training Camp, Bernueng Sor.Salacheep and Alessio Malatesta

=== Results ===
ONE Friday Fights 109 (YouTube / Watch ONE)
Weight Class				Method	Round	Time	Notes
Bantamweight Muay Thai	(Thailand) Yod-IQ Or.Pimolsri	def.	(Algeria) Brice Delval	Decision (unanimous)	3	3:00	
Flyweight Muay Thai	(Thailand) Wuttikrai Wor.Chakrawut	def.	(Myanmar) Eh Mwi	TKO (elbows and knees)	1	2:37	
Catchweight (141 lbs) Muay Thai	(Thailand) Chama Superbon Training Camp	def.	(Thailand) Superjeng Tded99	TKO (punch)	3	1:57	
Catchweight (129 lbs) Muay Thai	(Thailand) Denkriangkrai Singha Mawynn	def.	(Thailand) Yodthongthai Sor.Sommai	Decision (unanimous)	3	3:00	
Atomweight Muay Thai	(Thailand) Bernueng Sor.Salacheep	def.	(Thailand) Chathai BangsaenFightclub	KO (head kick)	1	2:10	
Bantamweight Muay Thai	(Italy) Alessio Malatesta	def.	(Thailand) Kampeetewada Sitthikul	KO (punches)	2	2:28	
Catchweight (132 lbs) Muay Thai	(Thailand) Apiwat Sor.Somnuk	def.	(England) Jacob Thompson	Decision (unanimous)	3	3:00	
Bantamweight Kickboxing	(Japan) Yuki Yoza	def.	(Russia) Elbrus Osmanov	Decision (unanimous)	3	3:00	
Featherweight Kickboxing	(Iran) Mohammad Siasarani	def.	(Japan) Kaito Ono	Decision (unanimous)	3	3:00	
Strawweight MMA	(Russia) Torepchi Dongak	def.	(Philippines) Marwin Quirante	TKO (punches)	1	4:01	
Flyweight MMA	(Turkmenistan) Shazada Ataev	def.	(Philippines) Jean Claude Saclag	Submission (armbar)	2	3:47	

== ONE Friday Fights 110 ==
ONE Friday Fights 110: Worapon vs. Musaev
- Promotion: ONE Championship
- Date: May 30, 2025
- Venue: Lumpinee Boxing Stadium
- City: Bangkok, Thailand

ONE Friday Fights 110: Worapon vs. Musaev (also known as ONE Lumpinee 110) was a combat sports event produced by ONE Championship that took place on May 30, 2025, at Lumpinee Boxing Stadium in Bangkok, Thailand.

=== background ===
A 142-pounds Muay Thai bout between Worapon Lukjaoporongtom and Ilyas Musaev was headlined the event.

=== Bonus awards ===
The following fighters received $10,000 bonuses:

- Performance of the Night: Samingdam N.F.Looksuan, Lamsing Sor.Dechapan, Tun Min Aung, YodUdon BS Muaythai and Toyota Eaglemuaythai

=== Results ===
ONE Friday Fights 110 (YouTube / Watch ONE)
Weight Class				Method	Round	Time	Notes
Catchweight (142 lbs) Muay Thai	(Thailand) Worapon Lukjaoporongtom	def.	(Russia) Ilyas Musaev	Decision (unanimous)	3	3:00	Musaev missed weight (146.4 lb).
Flyweight Muay Thai	(Thailand) Samingdam N.F.Looksuan	def.	(Iran) Amir Naseri	KO (punch)	3	2:17	
Catchweight (128 lbs) Muay Thai	(Thailand) Lamsing Sor.Dechapan	def.	(Thailand) Pansak Wor.Wantawee	KO (punch)	3	1:10	
Catchweight (160 lbs) Muay Thai	(Myanmar) Tun Min Aung	def.	(Thailand) Chatpet Lampang Sports School	TKO (punches)	2	2:49	
Catchweight (136 lbs) Muay Thai	(Morocco) Mohamed Taoufyq	def.	(Thailand) Superchub BangsaenFightclub	KO (elbow and knees)	3	2:25	
Atomweight Muay Thai	(Thailand) Toyota Eaglemuaythai	def.	(Thailand) YodUdon BS.Muaythai	TKO (punches and knee)	3	2:56	
Catchweight (142 lbs) Muay Thai	(Turkey) Şoner Şen	def.	(Thailand) Komawut FA Group	Decision (unanimous)	3	3:00	
Catchweight (163 lbs) Muay Thai	(Iran) Arya Akbari	def.	(Argentina) Fernando Amaya	Decision (unanimous)	3	3:00	
Catchweight (138 lbs) Muay Thai	(Japan) Muga Seto	def.	(Myanmar) Super Yay Chan	Decision (unanimous)	3	3:00	
Strawweight Kickboxing	(Japan) Ryuki Kawano	def.	(China) Hu Ye	Decision (unanimous)	3	3:00	
Middleweight MMA	(Russia) Ivan Gnizditskiy	def.	(Uzbekistan) Khurshidbek Bozarboev	TKO (punches)	1	3:54	
Lightweight MMA	(Republic of Ireland) Sheagh Dobbin	def.	(Portugal) Diogo Calado	TKO (doctor stoppage)	1	2:06	

== ONE Friday Fights 111 ==
ONE Friday Fights 111: Phetsukumvit vs. Vitez
- Promotion: ONE Championship
- Date: June 6, 2025
- Venue: Lumpinee Boxing Stadium
- City: Bangkok, Thailand

ONE Friday Fights 111: Phetsukumvit vs. Vitez (also known as ONE Lumpinee 111) was a combat sports event produced by ONE Championship that took place on June 6, 2025, at Lumpinee Boxing Stadium in Bangkok, Thailand.

=== background ===
A flyweight Muay Thai bout between Phetsukumvit Boybangna and Silviu Vitez was headlined the event.

=== Bonus awards ===
The following fighters received $10,000 bonuses:

- Performance of the Night: Pompet Panthonggym, Islay Erika Bomogao, Michael Baranov and Maksim Bakhtin

=== Results ===
ONE Friday Fights 111 (YouTube / Watch ONE)
Weight Class				Method	Round	Time	Notes
Flyweight Muay Thai	(Thailand) Phetsukumvit Boybangna	def.	(Romania) Silviu Vitez	TKO (punches)	2	1:40	
Flyweight Muay Thai	(Thailand) Pompet Panthonggym	def.	(Thailand) Puengluang Banrambaa	KO (punch)	2	1:47	
Catchweight (137 lbs) Muay Thai	(Myanmar) Sonrak Fairtex	def.	(Thailand) Petwichit Singha Mawynn	Decision (unanimous)	3	3:00	
Catchweight (130 lbs) Muay Thai	(Thailand) Watcharapon Singha Mawynn	def.	(Thailand) Petpayathai Sangmorakot	Decision (unanimous)	3	3:00	
Catchweight (136 lbs) Muay Thai	(Thailand) Korpai Sor. Yingcharoenkarnchang	def.	(Thailand) Jaopuenyai Kiatkongkreangkrai	KO (spinning elbow)	2	1:43	
Catchweight (118 lbs) Muay Thai	(Ukraine) Andrii Mezentsev	def.	(Thailand) Lanyakaew Tor.Silapon	Decision (split)	3	3:00	
Catchweight (103 lbs) Muay Thai	(Philippines) Islay Erika Bomogao	def.	(Spain) Nerea Rubio	KO (punch to the body)	1	1:05	
Featherweight Muay Thai	(Russia) Michael Baranov	def.	(Argentina) Angel Bauza	KO (punch)	2	0:17	
Lightweight Muay Thai	(Russia) Maksim Bakhtin	def.	(Argentina) Javier Aparcio	KO (elbow)	1	1:17	
Catchweight (100 lbs) Kickboxing	(Japan) Misaki	def.	(China) Ran Longshu	Decision (unanimous)	3	3:00	
Flyweight MMA	(Russia) Imran Satiev	def.	(Uzbekistan) Dzhokhar Eskiev	Decision (split)	3	5:00	
Featherweight MMA	(Japan) Seiya Matsuda	def.	(Pakistan) Bilal Hussain	Submission (kimura)	2	1:10	

== ONE Friday Fights 112 ==
ONE Friday Fights 112: Singdomthong vs. Ondash
- Promotion: ONE Championship
- Date: June 13, 2025
- Venue: Lumpinee Boxing Stadium
- City: Bangkok, Thailand

ONE Friday Fights 112: Singdomthong vs. Ondash (also known as ONE Lumpinee 112) was a combat sports event produced by ONE Championship that took place on June 13, 2025, at Lumpinee Boxing Stadium in Bangkok, Thailand.

=== background ===
A 127-pounds Muay Thai bout between Singdomthong Nokjeanladkrabang and Abdallah Ondash was headlined the event.

=== Bonus awards ===
The following fighters received $10,000 bonuses:

- Performance of the Night: Thway Lin Htet, Payaksurin JP.Power, Samanchai Sor.Sommai, Tahaneak Nayokatasala and Hiroki Naruo

=== Results ===
ONE Friday Fights 112 (YouTube / Watch ONE)
Weight Class				Method	Round	Time	Notes
Catchweight (127 lbs) Muay Thai	(Lebanon) Abdallah Ondash	def.	(Thailand) Singdomthong Nokjeanladkrabang	KO (punch)	1	2:03	
Strawweight Muay Thai	(Myanmar) Thway Lin Htet	def.	(Thailand) Kritpet P.K.Saenchai	KO (spinning back elbow)	1	1:43	
Catchweight (124 lbs) Muay Thai	(Thailand) Payaksurin JP.Power	def.	(Thailand) Face Erawan	TKO (punches)	2	0:43	
Strawweight Muay Thai	(Thailand) Samanchai Sor.Sommai	def.	(Thailand) Arsoonnoi Sitjasing	KO (head kick)	2	2:43	
Catchweight (123 lbs) Muay Thai	(Thailand) Tahaneak Nayokatasala	def.	(Thailand) Binladin Sor.Poonsawat	TKO (punches and knee)	3	1:55	
Catchweight (129 lbs) Muay Thai	(Thailand) Khunpon Aekmuangnon	def.	(China) Tang Qiqin	Decision (unanimous)	3	3:00	
Flyweight Muay Thai	(Thailand) Khunponnoi Sor.Sommai	def.	(Myanmar) Moe Htet Aung	Decision (unanimous)	3	3:00	
Strawweight Muay Thai	(France) Enzo Clarisse	def.	(Thailand) Padejsuk N.F.Looksuan	KO (punches)	2	2:01	
Bantamweight Muay Thai	(Myanmar) Saw Min Min	def.	(Australia) Josh Trowbridge	KO (punches)	3	2:53	
Catchweight (139 lbs) Kickboxing	(Japan) Hiroki Naruo	def.	(China) Zhang Haiyang	TKO (punches and body kick)	1	2:07	
Lightweight MMA	(Russia) Kasim Magomedshapiev	def.	(Japan) Hidenari Saijo	TKO (punches)	1	0:33	
Flyweight MMA	(China) Yin Xiangzhao	def.	(Vietnam) Trong Vin Mui	Decision (unanimous)	3	5:00	

== ONE Friday Fights 113 ==
ONE Friday Fights 113: Donking vs. Yodlekpet
- Promotion: ONE Championship
- Date: June 20, 2025
- Venue: Lumpinee Boxing Stadium
- City: Bangkok, Thailand

ONE Friday Fights 113: Donking vs. Yodlekpet (also known as ONE Lumpinee 113) was a combat sports event produced by ONE Championship that took place on June 20, 2025, at Lumpinee Boxing Stadium in Bangkok, Thailand.

=== background ===
A flyweight Muay Thai bout between Donking Yotharakmuaythai and Yodlekpet Or.Atchariya was headlined the event.

=== Bonus awards ===
The following fighters received $10,000 bonuses:

- Performance of the Night: Yodlekpet Or.Atchariya, Numsurin Chor.Ketwina and Asadula Imangazaliev

=== Results ===
ONE Friday Fights 113 (YouTube / Watch ONE)
Weight Class				Method	Round	Time	Notes
Flyweight Muay Thai	(Thailand) Yodlekpet Or.Atchariya	def.	(Thailand) Donking Yotharakmuaythai	KO (punch)	1	2:21	
Catchweight (130 lbs) Muay Thai	(Thailand) Decho Por.Borirak	def.	(Thailand) Isannuea Chotbangsaen	Decision (unanimous)	3	3:00	
Catchweight (117 lbs) Muay Thai	(Thailand) Numsurin Chor.Ketwina	def.	(Thailand) Paeyim Sor.Boonmeerit	KO (punches to the body)	2	2:10	
Catchweight (118 lbs) Muay Thai	(Thailand) Sunday Boomdeksean	def.	(Brazil) Dionatha Santos Tobias	Decision (unanimous)	3	3:00	
Catchweight (130 lbs) Muay Thai	(Thailand) Petwiset Petkiatpet	def.	(Thailand) Rungpet Petcharoen	KO (punch)	2	0:18	
Flyweight Muay Thai	(Russia) Asadula Imangazaliev	def.	(Thailand) Denphuthai MC SuperlekMuayThai	KO (punches)	2	0:52	
Women's Atomweight Muay Thai	(Chile) Francisca Vera	def.	(Thailand) Nongfahsai TOP P.K.Saenchai	Decision (unanimous)	3	3:00	Nongfahsai missed weight (115.2 lb).
Lightweight Muay Thai	(Poland) Maciej Karpinski	def.	(England) Donny Smith	TKO (punch)	2	1:05	
Catchweight (157 lbs) Muay Thai	(Morocco) Ayoub El Khadraoui	def.	(Japan) Kaisei Sato	TKO (knee)	2	0:30	
Strawweight MMA	(Philippines) Jayson Miralpez	def.	(China) Yeerzati Gemingnuer	TKO (elbows)	1	3:23	
Flyweight MMA	(Uzbekistan) Sardor Karimboev	def.	(Kyrgyzstan) Roman Popov	Submission (triangle armbar)	1	1:38	

== ONE Friday Fights 114 ==
ONE Friday Fights 114: Sangarthit vs. Suablack
- Promotion: ONE Championship
- Date: June 27, 2025
- Venue: Lumpinee Boxing Stadium
- City: Bangkok, Thailand

ONE Friday Fights 114: Sangarthit vs. Suablack (also known as ONE Lumpinee 114) was a combat sports event produced by ONE Championship that took place on June 27, 2025, at Lumpinee Boxing Stadium in Bangkok, Thailand.

=== background ===
A bantamweight Muay Thai bout between Felipe Lobo and Kulabdam Sor.Jor.Piek-U-Thai was scheduled to headline the event. On June 24, 2025, it got announced via One Championship's Instagram that Kulabdam has withdrawn from his bantamweight Muay Thai bout against Felipe Lobo due to injury. Therefore, the kickboxing bout between Sangarthit and Suablack headlined the event.

=== Bonus awards ===
The following fighters received $10,000 bonuses:

- Performance of the Night: Muangthai P.K.Saenchai, Saeksan Or.Kwanmuang, Aslamjon Ortikov, Ramadan Ondash and Jurai Ishii

=== Results ===
ONE Friday Fights 114 (YouTube / Watch ONE)
Weight Class				Method	Round	Time	Notes
Catchweight (140 lbs) Kickboxing	(Thailand) Suablack Tor.Pran49	def.	(Thailand) Sangarthit Looksaikongdin	Decision (unanimous)	3	3:00	
Catchweight (140 lbs) Muay Thai	(Thailand) Muangthai P.K.Saenchai	def.	(Thailand) Saeksan Or. Kwanmuang	Decision (unanimous)	3	3:00	
Featherweight Muay Thai	(France) Elies Abdelali	def.	(Thailand) PTT Apichartfarm	Decision (split)	3	3:00	
Flyweight Muay Thai	(Uzbekistan) Aslamjon Ortikov	def.	(Thailand) Phetsukumvit Boybangna	KO (body kick)	3	2:33	
Strawweight Muay Thai	(Thailand) Kompetch Fairtex	def.	(Thailand) Kongchai Chanaidonmuang	Decision (unanimous)	3	3:00	
Strawweight Muay Thai	(Algeria) Yonis Anane	def.	(China) Liu Junchao	Decision (unanimous)	3	3:00	
Strawweight Muay Thai	(Lebanon) Ramadan Ondash	def.	(Thailand) Chartpayak Saksatoon	KO (punch)	2	0:33	
Atomweight Muay Thai	(Japan) Nadaka Yoshinari	def.	(Thailand) Banluelok Sitwatcharachai	Decision (unanimous)	3	3:00	
Catchweight (128 lbs) Muay Thai	(Japan) Asahi Shinagawa	def.	(Thailand) Petphupa Aekpujean	Decision (unanimous)	3	3:00	
Catchweight (120 lbs) Muay Thai	(Japan) Jurai Ishii	def.	(Morocco) Youness Mounine	KO (knee to the body)	2	2:57	
Bantamweight Submission Grappling	(Japan) Takuma Sudo	def.	(Russia) Shamsudin Magomedov	Decision (unanimous)	1	10:00	

== ONE Friday Fights 115 ==
ONE Friday Fights 115: Rambong vs. Suriyanlek
- Promotion: ONE Championship
- Date: July 4, 2025
- Venue: Lumpinee Boxing Stadium
- City: Bangkok, Thailand

ONE Friday Fights 115: Rambong vs. Suriyanlek (also known as ONE Lumpinee 115) was a combat sports event produced by ONE Championship that took place on July 4, 2025, at Lumpinee Boxing Stadium in Bangkok, Thailand.

=== background ===
A 132-pounds Muay Thai bout between Rambong Sor.Therapat and Suriyanlek Por.Yenying was headlined the event.

=== Bonus awards ===
The following fighters received $10,000 bonuses:

- Performance of the Night: Suriyanlek Por.Yenying, Gingsanglek Tor.Laksong and Shoya Ishiguro

=== Results ===
ONE Friday Fights 115 (YouTube / Watch ONE)
Weight Class				Method	Round	Time	Notes
Catchweight (132 lbs) Muay Thai	(Thailand) Suriyanlek Por.Yenying	def.	(Thailand) Rambong Sor.Therapat	KO (punch)	2	2:39	
Flyweight Muay Thai	(Thailand) Gingsanglek Tor.Laksong	def.	(Russia) Alexey Balyko	KO (spinning backfist)	1	0:53	
Catchweight (122 lbs) Muay Thai	(Thailand) Maisangkum Sor. Yingcharoenkarnchang	def.	(Thailand) Petsangwan Sor.Samarngarment	Decision (unanimous)	3	3:00	
Atomweight Muay Thai	(Thailand) Chatpichit Sor.Sor.Toipadriew	def.	(Thailand) Khunsuk Mor.Krungthepthonburi	Decision (unanimous)	3	3:00	Khunsuk missed weight (117 lb)
Catchweight (118 lbs) Muay Thai	(Thailand) Anon Taladkondernmuangpon	def.	(Thailand) Samsiblan Sor.Sasiwat	KO (punch)	2	2:21	
Flyweight Muay Thai	(United States) Ahavat Gordon	def.	(Thailand) Seksan Fairtex	Decision (unanimous)	3	3:00	
Catchweight (112 lbs) Muay Thai	(Thailand) Chabakaew Sor.Kanjanchai	def.	(Sweden) Moa Carlsson	Decision (unanimous)	3	3:00	
Catchweight (130 lbs) Muay Thai	(Pakistan) Ubaid Hussain	def.	(Thailand) Petnakian Sor.Nakian	Decision (unanimous)	3	3:00	
Catchweight (118 lbs) Muay Thai	(Brazil) Gabriele Moram	def.	(France) Lou-Elise Manuel	Decision (unanimous)	3	3:00	
Bantamweight Submission Grappling	(Japan) Shoya Ishiguro	def.	(United States) Denny Sisti	Submission (neck crank)	1	6:20	

== ONE Friday Fights 116 ==
ONE Friday Fights 116: Adam vs. Mohammed 2
- Promotion: ONE Championship
- Date: July 18, 2025
- Venue: Lumpinee Boxing Stadium
- City: Bangkok, Thailand

ONE Friday Fights 116: Adam vs. Mohammed 2 (also known as ONE Lumpinee 116) was a combat sports event produced by ONE Championship that took place on July 18, 2025, at Lumpinee Boxing Stadium in Bangkok, Thailand.

=== background ===
A 112-pounds Muay Thai rematch between Adam Sor.Dechapan and "Petsam" Nahyan Mohammed was headlined the event. The pairing previously met at ONE Friday Fights 107 in May 2025, which Adam win by split decision.

=== Bonus awards ===
The following fighters received $10,000 bonuses:

- Performance of the Night: Nahyan Mohammed, Antar Kacem, Tomyamkoong Bhumjaithai, Pamor-E-Daeng Chor.Chokamnuaychai and Isaac Mohammed

=== Results ===
ONE Friday Fights 116 (YouTube / Watch ONE)
Weight Class				Method	Round	Time	Notes
Catchweight (112 lbs) Muay Thai	(France) Nahyan Mohammed	def.	(Malaysia) Adam Sor.Dechapan	TKO (knees and elbows)	2	1:33	
Catchweight (142 lbs) Muay Thai	(Belarus) Antar Kacem	def.	(Thailand) Panrit Lukjaomaesaiwaree	KO (punch)	2	2:07	
Catchweight (130 lbs) Muay Thai	(Thailand) Tomyamkoong Bhumjaithai	def.	(Thailand) Watcharapon Singha Mawynn	KO (punch)	2	0:34	
Atomweight Muay Thai	(Thailand) Koko Mor.Rattanabundit	def.	(Thailand) Teeyai Tded99	Decision (unanimous)	3	3:00	Teeyai missed weight (118 lb).
Catchweight (130 lbs) Muay Thai	(Thailand) Panpadej N.F.Looksuan	def.	(Thailand) Sirichok Sor.Sommai	Decision (unanimous)	3	3:00	
Catchweight (122 lbs) Muay Thai	(Thailand) Pamor-E-Daeng Chor.Chokamnuaychai	def.	(Thailand) Yodkitti Fiatpathum	KO (head kick)	1	1:06	
Catchweight (138 lbs) Muay Thai	(Thailand) Superball Tded99	def.	(Russia) Ibragim Abdulmedzhidov	TKO (arm injury)	2	3:00	Abdulmedzhidov missed weight (138.2 lb).
Catchweight (117 lbs) Muay Thai	(France) Isaac Mohammed	def.	(Japan) Haruyuki Tanitsu	KO (punches and head kick)	1	2:54	
Bantamweight Kickboxing	(Japan) Yuki Yoza	def.	(Thailand) Petchtanong Petchfergus	Decision (unanimous)	3	3:00	
Catchweight (127 lbs) MMA	(Uzbekistan) Avazbek Kholmirzaev	def.	(Japan) Tatsumitsu Wada	Decision (unanimous)	3	5:00	
Women's Atomweight MMA	(Japan) Ayaka Miura	def.	(Colombia) Juliana Otalora	Submission (scarf hold Americana)	1	3:53	
Strawweight MMA	(South Korea) Lee Seung-chul	def.	(Japan) Hiroba Minowa	Decision (unanimous)	3	5:00	

== ONE Friday Fights 117 ==
ONE Friday Fights 117: Yod-IQ vs. Malatesta
- Promotion: ONE Championship
- Date: July 25, 2025
- Venue: Lumpinee Boxing Stadium
- City: Bangkok, Thailand

ONE Friday Fights 117: Yod-IQ vs. Malatesta (also known as ONE Lumpinee 117) was a combat sports event produced by ONE Championship that took place on July 25, 2025, at Lumpinee Boxing Stadium in Bangkok, Thailand.

=== background ===
A bantamweight Muay Thai bout between Yod-IQ Or.Pimonsri and Alessio Malatesta was headlined the event.

=== Bonus awards ===
The following fighters received $10,000 bonuses:

- Performance of the Night: Elbrus Osmanov, Teeyai P.K.Saenchai and Tyson Harrison

=== Results ===
ONE Friday Fights 117 (YouTube / Watch ONE)
Weight Class				Method	Round	Time	Notes
Bantamweight Muay Thai	(Thailand) Yod-IQ Or.Pimolsri	def.	(Italy) Alessio Malatesta	Decision (unanimous)	3	3:00	
Bantamweight Muay Thai	(Russia) Elbrus Osmanov	def.	(Thailand) Kampeetewada Sitthikul	KO (punch)	1	2:10	
Flyweight Muay Thai	(Thailand) Maemmot Sor.Salacheep	def.	(Thailand) Rittidet Sor.Sommai	KO (punch)	3	0:21	
Catchweight (143 lbs) Muay Thai	(Laos) Lamnamkhong BS.Muaythai	def.	(Thailand) Superjeng Tded99	Decision (unanimous)	3	3:00	
Catchweight (119 lbs) Muay Thai	(Thailand) Teeyai P.K.Saenchai	def.	(Thailand) Yodsila Chor.Hapayak	KO (punch)	3	0:19	
Women's Atomweight Muay Thai	(Thailand) Tangtang Sor.Dechapan	def.	(Thailand) Pinpet Mor.Rajabhatkorat	Decision (unanimous)	3	3:00	
Bantamweight Muay Thai	(Australia) Tyson Harrison	def.	(United States) Kendu Irving	TKO (spinning back elbow and punches)	1	2:12	
Atomweight Muay Thai	(Ecuador) Martín Parra	def.	(Italy) Antonio Piana	Decision (unanimous)	3	3:00	
Bantamweight Kickboxing	(Uzbekistan) Uzair Ismoiljonov	def.	(Japan) Kiyoto Takahashi	TKO (punch)	1	1:24	Ismoiljonov missed weight (148.2 lb).
Bantamweight Kickboxing	(Japan) Ryota Nakano	def.	(France) Arthur Klopp	Decision (split)	3	3:00	
Featherweight MMA	(France) Alexandre Khan	def.	(China) Cao Fujun	Submission (anaconda choke)	2	1:17	

== ONE Friday Fights 118 ==
ONE Friday Fights 118: Worapon vs. Şen 3
- Promotion: ONE Championship
- Date: August 1, 2025
- Venue: Lumpinee Boxing Stadium
- City: Bangkok, Thailand

ONE Friday Fights 118: Worapon vs. Şen 3 (also known as ONE Lumpinee 118) was a combat sports event produced by ONE Championship that took place on August 1, 2025, at Lumpinee Boxing Stadium in Bangkok, Thailand.

=== background ===
A 142-pounds Muay Thai trilogy between Worapon Lukjaoporongtom and Şoner Şen was headlined the event. The pairing previously met at ONE Friday Fights 93 in January 2025, which Şen win by unanimous decision. The second time met at ONE Friday Fights 99 in March 2025, which Worapon win by unanimous decision.

=== Bonus awards ===
The following fighters received $10,000 bonuses:

- Performance of the Night: Zhang Jingtao

=== Results ===
ONE Friday Fights 118 (YouTube / Watch ONE)
Weight Class				Method	Round	Time	Notes
Catchweight (142 lbs) Muay Thai	(Thailand) Worapon Lukjaoporongtom	def.	(Turkey) Şoner Şen	Decision (unanimous)	3	3:00	
Catchweight (141 lbs) Muay Thai	(Thailand) Kongkula Jitmuangnon	def.	(Thailand) Suksawat P.K.Saenchai	Decision (unanimous)	3	3:00	
Catchweight (140 lbs) Muay Thai	(Thailand) Kaokarat Sor.Tienpo	def.	(Thailand) Chatpet Sor.Jor.Tongprajin	Decision (unanimous)	3	3:00	
Catchweight (126 lbs) Muay Thai	(Thailand) Singtanawat Nokjeanladkrabang	def.	(Spain) Pol Pascual	Decision (unanimous)	3	3:00	
Atomweight Muay Thai	(Malaysia) Rifdean Masdor	def.	(Thailand) Bernueng Sor.Salacheep	Decision (majority)	3	3:00	
Atomweight Muay Thai	(Thailand) Pet Suanluangrodyok	def.	(Thailand) Petthanwa Eaglemuaythai	KO (punch to the body)	2	2:56	
Bantamweight Muay Thai	(England) Otis Waghorn	def.	(France) Hakim Bah	Decision (split)	3	3:00	
Catchweight (140 lbs) Muay Thai	(Scotland) Logan Chan	def.	(Thailand) Chama Superbon Training Camp	KO (elbow)	1	2:51	Chama missed weight (140.2 lb).
Catchweight (139 lbs) Kickboxing	(China) Zhang Jingtao	def.	(Japan) Hiroki Naruo	KO (head kick)	2	2:32	
Catchweight (119 lbs) Kickboxing	(Japan) Kojiro Shiba	def.	(Laos) Mon Yoddhaxay	TKO (knee and punches)	2	1:14	
Featherweight MMA	(Mongolia) Nachyn Sat	def.	(Philippines) Carlos Alvarez	TKO (knee to the body)	2	2:51	
Strawweight MMA	(Italy) Gabriele Lionetti	def.	(Philippines) Jan Menard Atole	Submission (armbar)	2	3:23	

== ONE Friday Fights 119 ==
ONE Friday Fights 119: Samingdam vs. Sonrak
- Promotion: ONE Championship
- Date: August 8, 2025
- Venue: Lumpinee Boxing Stadium
- City: Bangkok, Thailand

ONE Friday Fights 119: Samingdam vs. Sonrak (also known as ONE Lumpinee 119) was a combat sports event produced by ONE Championship that took place on August 8, 2025, at Lumpinee Boxing Stadium in Bangkok, Thailand.

=== background ===
A flyweight Muay Thai bout between Gingsanglek Tor.Laksong and Thant Zin was scheduled to headline the event, but the bout was cancelled due Gingsanglek having an illness, and the bout was instead replaced by Samingdam N.F.Looksuan and Sonrak Fairtex.

=== Bonus awards ===
The following fighters received $10,000 bonuses:

- Performance of the Night: Petlampun Muadablampang, Abdessamie Rhenimi, Sanit Lookthamsuea and Masahito Okuyama

=== Results ===
ONE Friday Fights 119 (YouTube / Watch ONE)
Weight Class				Method	Round	Time	Notes
Catchweight (140 lbs) Muay Thai	(Thailand) Samingdam N.F.Looksuan	def.	(Myanmar) Sonrak Fairtex	Decision (unanimous)	3	3:00	
Featherweight Muay Thai	(Thailand) Khunsuek Superbon Training Camp	def.	(Iran) Hassan Vahdanirad	Decision (unanimous)	3	3:00	
Catchweight (126 lbs) Muay Thai	(Thailand) Petlampun Muadablampang	def.	(Thailand) Pataknin Sinbimuaythai	KO (punch)	2	1:50	
Catchweight (133 lbs) Muay Thai	(Thailand) Sanpet Sor.Salacheep	def.	(Thailand) Chattawee Nayokjoyprajin	KO (punch)	1	0:47	
Strawweight Muay Thai	(Morocco) Abdessamie Rhenimi	def.	(Thailand) Petwiset Petkiatpet	TKO (punches)	2	2:30	
Catchweight (130 lbs) Muay Thai	(Thailand) Sanit Lookthamsuea	def.	(Myanmar) Sein Lone Chaw	KO (punch)	2	1:32	
Flyweight Muay Thai	(Thailand) Khunponnoi Sor.Sommai	def.	(Morocco) Walid Sakhraji	Decision (unanimous)	3	3:00	
Catchweight (141 lbs) Muay Thai	(Thailand) Detchawalit Silkmuaythai	def.	(Iran) Majid Seydali	TKO (punches)	1	2:12	
Catchweight (117 lbs) Kickboxing	(Japan) Yumeto Mizuno	def.	(China) Luo Chenghao	Decision (split)	3	3:00	
Bantamweight Kickboxing	(Japan) Masahito Okuyama	def.	(Turkey) Cengiz Lale	TKO (knee and punches)	3	0:30	
Welterweight MMA	(Russia) Mikail Makrushin	def.	(Turkey) Ruslan Arslangereev	TKO (punch)	1	1:32	
Catchweight (128 lbs) Muay Thai	(Canada) Taylor McClatchie	def.	(Lebanon) Yara Saleh	Decision (unanimous)	3	3:00	

== ONE Friday Fights 120 ==
ONE Friday Fights 120: Yodlekpet vs. Pompet
- Promotion: ONE Championship
- Date: August 15, 2025
- Venue: Lumpinee Boxing Stadium
- City: Bangkok, Thailand

ONE Friday Fights 120: Yodlekpet vs. Pompet (also known as ONE Lumpinee 120) was a combat sports event produced by ONE Championship that took place on August 15, 2025, at Lumpinee Boxing Stadium in Bangkok, Thailand.

=== background ===
A flyweight Muay Thai bout between Yodlekpet Or.Atchariya and Pompet Panthonggym was headlined the event.

=== Bonus awards ===
The following fighters received $10,000 bonuses:

- Performance of the Night: Gingsanglek Tor.Laksong, Wuttikrai Wor.Chakrawut and Jurai Ishii

=== Results ===
ONE Friday Fights 120 (YouTube / Watch ONE)
Weight Class				Method	Round	Time	Notes
Flyweight Muay Thai	(Thailand) Yodlekpet Or.Atchariya	def.	(Thailand) Pompet Panthonggym	Decision (split)	3	3:00	
Flyweight Muay Thai	(Thailand) Gingsanglek Tor.Laksong	def.	(Myanmar) Thant Zin	TKO (punch)	1	1:11	
Flyweight Muay Thai	(Thailand) Wuttikrai Wor.Chakrawut	def.	(Morocco) Mohamed Taoufyq	TKO (punches and knee)	1	1:26	
Catchweight (126 lbs) Muay Thai	(Uzbekistan) Khazan Salomov	def.	(Thailand) Brazil Aekmuangnon	Decision (split)	3	3:00	
Catchweight (130 lbs) Muay Thai	(Uzbekistan) Khusen Salomov	def.	(Thailand) Rocky Kangaroo Muaythai	Decision (unanimous)	3	3:00	
Catchweight (120 lbs) Muay Thai	(Thailand) Yodanucha Por.Prajansi	def.	(Thailand) Jaoinsee P.K.Saenchai	Decision (unanimous)	3	3:00	
Catchweight (148 lbs) Muay Thai	(Algeria) Brice Delval	def.	(Turkey) Mert Aslan	TKO (punch)	3	2:09	
Catchweight (128 lbs) Muay Thai	(Lebanon) Omar El Halabi	def.	(Myanmar) Soe Naung Oo	Decision (unanimous)	3	3:00	El Halabi missed weight (132 lb).
Catchweight (120 lbs) Muay Thai	(Japan) Jurai Ishii	def.	(Myanmar) Har Ling Om	KO (head kick)	3	2:16	
Catchweight (138 lbs) Kickboxing	(Japan) Gump	def.	(China) Zhang Haiyang	Decision (unanimous)	3	3:00	
Flyweight MMA	(Uzbekistan) Sardor Karimboev	def.	(South Korea) Jang Seong-gyu	Decision (split)	3	5:00	
Women's Atomweight MMA	(Japan) Itsuki Hirata	def.	(India) Aarti Khatri	Decision (unanimous)	3	5:00	

== ONE Friday Fights 121 ==
ONE Friday Fights 121: Tengnueng vs. Bakhtin
- Promotion: ONE Championship
- Date: August 22, 2025
- Venue: Lumpinee Boxing Stadium
- City: Bangkok, Thailand

ONE Friday Fights 121: Tengnueng vs. Bakhtin (also known as ONE Lumpinee 121) was a combat sports event produced by ONE Championship that took place on August 22, 2025, at Lumpinee Boxing Stadium in Bangkok, Thailand.

=== background ===
A lightweight Muay Thai bout between Tengnueng Fairtex and Maksim Bakhtin was headlined the event.

=== Bonus awards ===
The following fighters received $10,000 bonuses:

- Performance of the Night: Maksim Bakhtin, Thway Lin Htet, Petchakrit Gavingym, Shimon Yoshinari and Ryuya Okuwaki

=== Results ===
ONE Friday Fights 121 (YouTube / Watch ONE)
Weight Class				Method	Round	Time	Notes
Lightweight Muay Thai	(Russia) Maksim Bakhtin	def.	(Thailand) Tengnueng Fairtex	KO (spinning back elbow)	2	0:45	
Strawweight Muay Thai	(Myanmar) Thway Lin Htet	def.	(Thailand) Chokpreecha P.K.Saenchai	TKO (elbow)	2	1:52	
Catchweight (128 lbs) Muay Thai	(Thailand) Denkriangkrai Singha Mawynn	def.	(Thailand) Lamsing Sor.Dechapan	Decision (unanimous)	3	3:00	
Strawweight Muay Thai	(Thailand) Rungruanglek T.N.Muaythai	def.	(Thailand) Payaksurin JP.Power	Decision (majority)	3	3:00	
Catchweight (118 lbs) Muay Thai	(Ukraine) Andrii Mezentsev	def.	(Thailand) Sunday Boomdeksean	Decision (unanimous)	3	3:00	
Catchweight (122 lbs) Muay Thai	(Thailand) Petchakrit Gavingym	def.	(Thailand) Pamor-E-Daeng Chor.Chokamnuaychai	KO (punch)	2	0:39	
Catchweight (130 lbs) Muay Thai	(Pakistan) Ubaid Hussain	def.	(Thailand) Petnakian Sor.Nakian	Decision (unanimous)	3	3:00	
Featherweight Muay Thai	(Turkey) Ali Kelat	def.	(Russia) Michael Baranov	KO (punches)	2	1:35	
Flyweight Muay Thai	(Japan) Shimon Yoshinari	def.	(Thailand) Pettonglor Sitluangpeenumfon	TKO (punches)	2	1:06	
Atomweight Muay Thai	(Japan) Ryuya Okuwaki	def.	(Thailand) Nuaphet Kelasport	KO (head kick)	2	2:22	
Catchweight (132 lbs) Muay Thai	(Thailand) Klarob Nuicafeboran	def.	(Iran) Mohammad Ali	KO (punches)	1	1:39	
Lightweight MMA	(Brazil) Jean Carlos Pereira	def.	(Republic of Ireland) Sheagh Dobbin	KO (punch)	2	0:35	

== ONE Friday Fights 122 ==
ONE Friday Fights 122: Panpayak vs. Imangazaliev
- Promotion: ONE Championship
- Date: August 29, 2025
- Venue: Lumpinee Boxing Stadium
- City: Bangkok, Thailand

ONE Friday Fights 122: Panpayak vs. Imangazaliev (also known as ONE Lumpinee 122) was a combat sports event produced by ONE Championship that took place on August 29, 2025, at Lumpinee Boxing Stadium in Bangkok, Thailand.

=== background ===
A flyweight Muay Thai bout between Panpayak Jitmuangnon and Asadula Imangazaliev was headlined the event.

=== Bonus awards ===
The following fighters received $10,000 bonuses:

- Performance of the Night: Asadula Imangazaliev, Tonglampoon FA.Group, Kohtao Petsomnuk and Isannuea Chotbangsaen

=== Results ===
ONE Friday Fights 122 (YouTube / Watch ONE)
Weight Class				Method	Round	Time	Notes
Flyweight Muay Thai	(Russia) Asadula Imangazaliev	def.	(Thailand) Panpayak Jitmuangnon	KO (head kick)	1	2:07	
Catchweight (117 lbs) Muay Thai	(Thailand) Numsurin Chor.Ketwina	def.	(Thailand) Songchainoi Kiatsongrit	Decision (majority)	3	3:00	
Bantamweight Muay Thai	(Thailand) Kongklai Sor.Sommai	def.	(Thailand) Ferrari Fairtex	KO (punch)	3	2:06	
Catchweight (122 lbs) Muay Thai	(Thailand) Tonglampoon FA.Group	def.	(Thailand) Kohtao Petsomnuk	Decision (majority)	3	3:00	
Catchweight (129 lbs) Muay Thai	(Thailand) Isannuea Chotbangsaen	def.	(Thailand) Focus Nayoksoywiangyonglamphun	KO (punch)	2	1:02	Focus missed weight (130.8 lb).
Catchweight (123 lbs) Muay Thai	(Thailand) Maisangngern Sor.Yingcharoenkarnchang	def.	(Thailand) Suajan Sor.Isarachot	KO (elbow and punch)	2	1:34	
Featherweight Kickboxing	(Iran) Mohammad Siasarani	def.	(Poland) Oskar Siegert	Decision (unanimous)	3	3:00	
Atomweight Muay Thai	(Japan) Nadaka Yoshinari	def.	(Morocco) Hamada Azmani	TKO (knee injury)	3	0:15	
Bantamweight Kickboxing	(Japan) Rikito	def.	(China) Zheng Zhaobin	Decision (split)	3	3:00	
Bantamweight MMA	(Mongolia) Batochir Batsaikhan	def.	(Brazil) Harlysson Nunes	TKO (punches)	3	1:17	
Bantamweight MMA	(Mongolia) Erdenebayar Tsolmon	def.	(Japan) Katsuaki Aoyagi	Decision (unanimous)	3	5:00	

== ONE Friday Fights 123 ==
ONE Friday Fights 123: Lobo vs. Kulabdam
- Promotion: ONE Championship
- Date: September 5, 2025
- Venue: Lumpinee Boxing Stadium
- City: Bangkok, Thailand

ONE Friday Fights 123: Lobo vs. Kulabdam (also known as ONE Lumpinee 123) was a combat sports event produced by ONE Championship that took place on September 5, 2025, at Lumpinee Boxing Stadium in Bangkok, Thailand.

=== background ===
A bantamweight Muay Thai bout between Felipe Lobo and Kulabdam Sor.Jor.Piek-U-Thai was headlined the event. The bout was originally scheduled at ONE Friday Fights 114 on June 27, but was cancelled after Kulabdam had an injury.

=== Bonus awards ===
The following fighters received $10,000 bonuses:

- Performance of the Night: Ayad Albadr

=== Results ===
ONE Friday Fights 123 (YouTube / Watch ONE)
Weight Class				Method	Round	Time	Notes
Bantamweight Muay Thai	(Thailand) Kulabdam Sor.Jor.Piek-U-Thai	def.	(Brazil) Felipe Lobo	Decision (unanimous)	3	3:00	
Catchweight (138 lbs) Muay Thai	(Thailand) Dedduanglek Tded99	def.	(Thailand) Buakhiao Por.Paoin	Decision (split)	3	3:00	
Catchweight (140 lbs) Muay Thai	(Thailand) Krisana Daodenmuaythai	def.	(Thailand) Komawut FA.Group	Decision (unanimous)	3	3:00	
Catchweight (128 lbs) Muay Thai	(Iraq) Ayad Albadr	def.	(Thailand) Nuapet Tded99	KO (punch)	1	2:36	
Catchweight (129 lbs) Muay Thai	(Thailand) Khunpon Aekmuangnon	def.	(France) Edilson Rodrigues	Decision (unanimous)	3	3:00	
Catchweight (110 lbs) Muay Thai	(Thailand) Chabakaew Sor.Kanjanchai	def.	(Thailand) Gusjung Fairtex	Decision (split)	3	3:00	
Flyweight Muay Thai	(Russia) Rustam Yunusov	def.	(Thailand) Donking Yotharakmuaythai	Decision (unanimous)	3	3:00	
Catchweight (140 lbs) Muay Thai	(Japan) Taimu Hisai	def.	(China) Zhang Jingtao	Decision (unanimous)	3	3:00	
Catchweight (131 lbs) Kickboxing	(Japan) Kosei Yoshida	def.	(Indonesia) Tovan Nopian	Decision (unanimous)	3	3:00	
Catchweight (129 lbs) Muay Thai	(Thailand) Sanit Lookthamsuea	def.	(Japan) Eisaku Ogasawara	KO (elbow)	2	0:42	
Bantamweight MMA	(Russia) Denis Andreev	def.	(Kyrgyzstan) Adilet Kalenderov	TKO (punches)	1	4:34	
Strawweight MMA	(Philippines) Moises Lois Ilogon	def.	(China) Bai Linbo	Decision (unanimous)	3	5:00	

== ONE Friday Fights 124 ==
ONE Friday Fights 124: Suriyanlek vs. Decho
- Promotion: ONE Championship
- Date: September 12, 2025
- Venue: Lumpinee Boxing Stadium
- City: Bangkok, Thailand

ONE Friday Fights 124: Suriyanlek vs. Decho (also known as ONE Lumpinee 124) was a combat sports event produced by ONE Championship that took place on September 12, 2025, at Lumpinee Boxing Stadium in Bangkok, Thailand.

=== background ===
A 132-pounds Muay Thai bout between Suriyanlek Por.Yenying and Decho Por.Borirak was headlined the event.

=== Bonus awards ===
The following fighters received $10,000 bonuses:

- Performance of the Night: Sandro Bosi, YodUdon BS.Muaythai, Alaverdi Ramazanov and Zhao Chongyang

=== Results ===
ONE Friday Fights 124 (YouTube / Watch ONE)
Weight Class				Method	Round	Time	Notes
Catchweight (132 lbs) Muay Thai	(Thailand) Suriyanlek Por.Yenying	def.	(Thailand) Decho Por.Borirak	Decision (unanimous)	3	3:00	
Flyweight Muay Thai	(Thailand) Maemmot Sor.Salacheep	def.	(Myanmar) Eh Mwi	Decision (unanimous)	3	3:00	
Atomweight Muay Thai	(France) Sandro Bosi	def.	(Russia) Kirill Chizhik	KO (punch)	1	2:45	
Catchweight (113 lbs) Muay Thai	(Thailand) YodUdon BS.Muaythai	def.	(Thailand) Kongburapha Or.Thepsupa	TKO (elbow and punch)	1	2:55	
Catchweight (123 lbs) Muay Thai	(Thailand) Payakrut Suajantokmuaythai	def.	(Laos) Kongpoxay Laolanexang	Decision (unanimous)	3	3:00	
Catchweight (112 lbs) Muay Thai	(Thailand) Ded Sor.Chokmeechai	def.	(Thailand) Sipalang Sor.Salacheep	Decision (split)	3	3:00	
Featherweight Muay Thai	(Russia) Alaverdi Ramazanov	def.	(Thailand) Dernchon Lukjaomaesaithong	KO (punch)	1	2:59	
Bantamweight Kickboxing	(China) Zhao Chongyang	def.	(Iran) Arman Moradi	KO (head kick)	2	2:57	
Catchweight (112 lbs) Kickboxing	(Thailand) Nongam Fairtex	def.	(Italy) Ester Viola	Decision (unanimous)	3	3:00	
Catchweight (128 lbs) Muay Thai	(Japan) Hikaru Furumura	def.	(Laos) Sonxay Laolanexang	KO (punch)	2	0:57	
Strawweight MMA	(Japan) Ryohei Kurosawa	def.	(Philippines) Jayson Miralpez	Decision (unanimous)	3	5:00	
Featherweight MMA	(Russia) Ivan Bondarchuk	def.	(Turkey) Kamal Guseynov	TKO (elbow and punches)	3	1:57	

== ONE Friday Fights 125 ==
ONE Friday Fights 125: Saemapetch vs. Osmanov
- Promotion: ONE Championship
- Date: September 19, 2025
- Venue: Lumpinee Boxing Stadium
- City: Bangkok, Thailand

ONE Friday Fights 125: Saemapetch vs. Osmanov (also known as ONE Lumpinee 125) was a combat sports event produced by ONE Championship that took place on September 19, 2025, at Lumpinee Boxing Stadium in Bangkok, Thailand.

=== background ===
A bantamweight Muay Thai bout between Saemapetch Fairtex and Elbrus Osmanov was headlined the event.

=== Bonus awards ===
The following fighters received $10,000 bonuses:

- Performance of the Night: Logan Chan

=== Results ===
ONE Friday Fights 125 (YouTube / Watch ONE)
Weight Class				Method	Round	Time	Notes
Bantamweight Muay Thai	(Russia) Elbrus Osmanov	def.	(Thailand) Saemapetch Fairtex	Decision (unanimous)	3	3:00	
Catchweight (138 lbs) Muay Thai	(Scotland) Logan Chan	def.	(Thailand) Saksri Superlekmuaythai	KO (punch to the body)	2	2:19	
Atomweight Muay Thai	(Thailand) Petninmungkorn Namkaengiceland	def.	(Thailand) Petnaya Nhongbangsai	Decision (unanimous)	3	3:00	
Strawweight Muay Thai	(Iran) Mehrdad Khanzadeh	def.	(Thailand) Kritpet P.K.Saenchai	Decision (split)	3	3:00	
Catchweight (118 lbs) Muay Thai	(Thailand) Anon Taladkondernmuangpon	def.	(Belgium) Gianny De Leu	KO (punch to the body)	2	1:50	
Catchweight (113 lbs) Muay Thai	(Thailand) Ikkyusan Sor.Salacheep	def.	(Thailand) Kampanthong Chor.Hapayak	Decision (split)	3	3:00	
Strawweight Muay Thai	(Thailand) Kongchai Chanaidonmuang	def.	(Brazil) Walter Goncalves	Decision (unanimous)	3	3:00	
Bantamweight Muay Thai	(Russia) Dzhamil Osmanov	def.	(Thailand) Guyasit Singha Mawynn	KO (punch)	2	1:36	
Women's Atomweight Muay Thai	(Turkey) Nefise Delikurt	def.	(China) Liu Yuer	Decision (unanimous)	3	3:00	
Catchweight (140 lbs) Muay Thai	(Japan) Muga Seto	def.	(France) Rayan Mekki	Decision (unanimous)	3	3:00	
Catchweight (139 lbs) MMA	(South Korea) Kim Kyung-jung	def.	(Japan) Su Sung Cho Gotoh	TKO (punches)	1	4:57	
Women's Atomweight MMA	(Australia) Kim Tran	def.	(Colombia) Juliana Otalora	TKO (punches)	3	2:03	

== ONE Friday Fights 126 ==
ONE Friday Fights 126: Ennahachi vs. Anane
- Promotion: ONE Championship
- Date: September 26, 2025
- Venue: Lumpinee Boxing Stadium
- City: Bangkok, Thailand

ONE Friday Fights 126: Ennahachi vs. Anane (also known as ONE Lumpinee 126) was a combat sports event produced by ONE Championship that took place on September 26, 2025, at Lumpinee Boxing Stadium in Bangkok, Thailand.

=== background ===
A bantamweight Kickboxing bout between former ONE Flyweight Kickboxing World Champion Ilias Ennahachi and current ONE Bantamweight Muay Thai World Champion Nabil Anane was headlined the event.

=== Bonus awards ===
The following fighters received $10,000 bonuses:

- Performance of the Night: Antar Kacem and Jurai Ishii

=== Results ===
ONE Friday Fights 126 (YouTube / Watch ONE)
Weight Class				Method	Round	Time	Notes
Bantamweight Kickboxing	(Netherlands) Ilias Ennahachi	vs.	(Algeria) Nabil Anane	NC (accidental groin strike)	3	0:23	Accidental groin strike rendered Ennahachi unable to continue
Featherweight Kickboxing	(China) Liu Mengyang	def.	(Thailand) Shadow Singha Mawynn	Decision (unanimous)	3	3:00	
Catchweight (140 lbs) Muay Thai	(Belarus) Antar Kacem	def.	(Thailand) Muangthai P.K.Saenchai	TKO (punches)	3	2:27	
Catchweight (140 lbs) Muay Thai	(Thailand) Suablack Tor.Pran49	def.	(Thailand) Saeksan Or. Kwanmuang	Decision (unanimous)	3	3:00	
Catchweight (147 lbs) Muay Thai	(Thailand) PTT Apichartfarm	def.	(Italy) Alessio Malatesta	Decision (split)	3	3:00	
Flyweight Muay Thai	(Thailand) Pompet Panthonggym	def.	(Thailand) Yodlekpet Or.Atchariya	Decision (split)	3	3:00	
Strawweight Muay Thai	(Thailand) Sam-A Gaiyanghadao	def.	(Myanmar) Thway Lin Htet	Decision (unanimous)	3	3:00	Sam-A missed weight (126.4 lb).
Catchweight (140 lbs) Kickboxing	(Thailand) Sangarthit Looksaikongdin	def.	(Turkey) Ali Koyuncu	Decision (unanimous)	3	3:00	Sangarthit missed weight (144.2 lb).
Strawweight Muay Thai	(Algeria) Yonis Anane	def.	(Vietnam) Huỳnh Hoàng Phi	Decision (unanimous)	3	3:00	
Strawweight Kickboxing	(Portugal) Rui Botelho	def.	(China) Zhang Peimian	Decision (split)	3	3:00	
Atomweight Kickboxing	(Malaysia) Adam Sor.Dechapan	def.	(Japan) Toma Kuroda	Decision (unanimous)	3	3:00	
Catchweight (120 lbs) Muay Thai	(Japan) Jurai Ishii	def.	(France) Enzo Clarisse	TKO (punches)	3	1:27	

== ONE Friday Fights 127 ==
ONE Friday Fights 127: Worapon vs. Kongkula
- Promotion: ONE Championship
- Date: October 3, 2025
- Venue: Lumpinee Boxing Stadium
- City: Bangkok, Thailand

ONE Friday Fights 127: Worapon vs. Kongkula (also known as ONE Lumpinee 127) was a combat sports event produced by ONE Championship that took place on October 3, 2025, at Lumpinee Boxing Stadium in Bangkok, Thailand.

=== background ===
A 142-pounds Muay Thai bout between Worapon Lukjaoporongtom and Kongkula Jitmuangnon was headlined the event.

=== Bonus awards ===
The following fighters received $10,000 bonuses:

- Performance of the Night: Parham Gheirati, Pichitchai P.K.Saenchai, Panpadej N.F.Looksuan, Tepkamin Tanapolresort, Bogdan Shumarov, Lucas Ganin and Jean Claude Saclag

=== Results ===
ONE Friday Fights 127 (YouTube / Watch ONE)
Weight Class				Method	Round	Time	Notes
Catchweight (142 lbs) Muay Thai	(Thailand) Worapon Lukjaoporongtom	def.	(Thailand) Kongkula Jitmuangnon	TKO (punches)	1	2:48	Worapon missed weight (144.6 lb).
Bantamweight Muay Thai	(Iran) Parham Gheirati	def.	(Australia) Tyson Harrison	KO (punches)	2	0:53	
Strawweight Muay Thai	(Thailand) Pichitchai P.K.Saenchai	def.	(Thailand) Singtanawat Nokjeanladkrabang	TKO (punch)	1	2:56	
Catchweight (128 lbs) Muay Thai	(Thailand) Panpadej N.F.Looksuan	def.	(Thailand) Petphupa Aekpujean	KO (punch)	2	1:40	Petphupa missed weight (130 lb).
Atomweight Muay Thai	(Thailand) Fahlikit Nayokjoyprajin	def.	(Indonesia) Mohamad Redho	Decision (unanimous)	3	3:00	
Atomweight Muay Thai	(Thailand) Tepkamin Tanapolresort	def.	(Thailand) Leampet Sor.Dechapan	TKO (punches)	2	1:03	
Lightweight Kickboxing	(Bulgaria) Bogdan Shumarov	def.	(Poland) Maciej Karpinski	KO (punches to the body)	1	2:41	
Catchweight (160 lbs) Muay Thai	(England) Erik Luis	def.	(Azerbaijan) Mammad Amraliyev	Decision (split)	3	3:00	
Women's Atomweight Muay Thai	(Thailand) Tangtang Sor.Dechapan	def.	(Mexico) Cynthia Flores	Decision (unanimous)	3	3:00	
Strawweight Muay Thai	(Thailand) Nongmoss Lookbanmai	def.	(Japan) Naruto	Decision (split)	3	3:00	
Bantamweight MMA	(Argentina) Lucas Ganin	def.	(Japan) Ayumu Yamamoto	Submission (ankle lock)	1	2:03	
Flyweight MMA	(Philippines) Jean Claude Saclag	def.	(Colombia) Juan Trujillo	TKO (spinning body kick and punches)	1	3:05	

== ONE Friday Fights 128 ==
ONE Friday Fights 128: Irvine vs. Rambong
- Promotion: ONE Championship
- Date: October 10, 2025
- Venue: Lumpinee Boxing Stadium
- City: Bangkok, Thailand

ONE Friday Fights 128: Irvine vs. Rambong (also known as ONE Lumpinee 128) was a combat sports event produced by ONE Championship that took place on October 10, 2025, at Lumpinee Boxing Stadium in Bangkok, Thailand.

=== background ===
A 130-pounds Muay Thai bout between Stephen Irvine and Rambong Sor.Therapat was headlined the event.

=== Bonus awards ===
The following fighters received $10,000 bonuses:

- Performance of the Night: Stephen Irvine, Anar Mammadov and Theraphon Dangkhaosai

=== Results ===
ONE Friday Fights 128 (YouTube / Watch ONE)
Weight Class				Method	Round	Time	Notes
Catchweight (130 lbs) Muay Thai	(Scotland) Stephen Irvine	def.	(Thailand) Rambong Sor.Therapat	KO (head kick)	1	2:47	
Catchweight (129 lbs) Muay Thai	(Thailand) Sanit Aekmuangnon	def.	(Thailand) Singdomthong Nokjeanladkrabang	Decision (unanimous)	3	3:00	
Flyweight Muay Thai	(Azerbaijan) Anar Mammadov	def.	(Thailand) Komawut FA.Group	TKO (punches)	2	0:44	
Catchweight (138 lbs) Muay Thai	(Morocco) Ayoub Yassine	def.	(Thailand) Kaokarat Sor.Tienpo	Decision (unanimous)	3	3:00	
Catchweight (118 lbs) Muay Thai	(Thailand) Wanchainoi Sor.Tor.Hiewbangsaen	def.	(Thailand) Koko Mor.Ratanabundit	Decision (unanimous)	3	3:00	
Strawweight Muay Thai	(Thailand) Theraphon Dangkhaosai	def.	(Thailand) Fahsodsai Tor.Morsri	KO (punches)	2	1:36	
Catchweight (107 lbs) Muay Thai	(Thailand) Duangdawnoi Looksaikongdin	def.	(Australia) Kim Townsend	Decision (unanimous)	3	3:00	
Strawweight Muay Thai	(Thailand) Payakrut Suajantokmuaythai	def.	(Morocco) Abdessamie Rhenimi	DQ (illegal soccer kick)	2	0:55	An illegal soccer kick to a downed Payakrut being knocked unconscious.
Flyweight Kickboxing	(Japan) Kazuteru Yamazaki	def.	(Morocco) Abdelhamid Talbi	Decision (unanimous)	3	3:00	
Featherweight MMA	(Russia) Evgenii Antonov	def.	(Azerbaijan) Suleyman Suleymanov	Decision (unanimous)	3	5:00	
Catchweight (139 lbs) Kickboxing	(Japan) Taku Takaiwa	def.	(Afghanistan) Nawid Ullah Saadi	TKO (spinning body kick and punch)	1	0:58	
Flyweight MMA	(England) Jason Seddoh	def.	(India) Vinay Kundu	KO (head kick)	1	3:21	

== ONE Friday Fights 129 ==
ONE Friday Fights 129: Tengnueng vs. Tun Min Aung
- Promotion: ONE Championship
- Date: October 17, 2025
- Venue: Lumpinee Boxing Stadium
- City: Bangkok, Thailand

ONE Friday Fights 129: Tengnueng vs. Tun Min Aung (also known as ONE Lumpinee 129) was a combat sports event produced by ONE Championship that took place on October 17, 2025, at Lumpinee Boxing Stadium in Bangkok, Thailand.

=== background ===
A 165-pounds Muay Thai bout between Tengnueng Fairtex and Tun Min Aung was headlined the event.

=== Bonus awards ===
The following fighters received $10,000 bonuses:

- Performance of the Night: Ayad Albadr, Brazil Aekmuangnon, Petchakrit Gavingym and Fergus Smith

=== Results ===
ONE Friday Fights 129 (YouTube / Watch ONE)
Weight Class				Method	Round	Time	Notes
Catchweight (165 lbs) Muay Thai	(Thailand) Tengnueng Fairtex	def.	(Myanmar) Tun Min Aung	Decision (unanimous)	3	3:00	
Catchweight (126 lbs) Muay Thai	(Iraq) Ayad Albadr	def.	(Thailand) Petlampun Muadablampang	KO (head kick)	1	1:26	
Catchweight (126 lbs) Muay Thai	(Thailand) Lamsing Sor.Dechapan	def.	(Uzbekistan) Khasan Salomov	Decision (split)	3	3:00	
Catchweight (130 lbs) Muay Thai	(Thailand) Brazil Aekmuangnon	def.	(Morocco) Soufiane Mejdoubi	TKO (leg injury)	2	0:27	
Catchweight (122 lbs) Muay Thai	(Thailand) Samanchai Sor.Sommai	def.	(Thailand) Tamnanthai P.K.Lekfirsthouse	Decision (split)	3	3:00	
Catchweight (122 lbs) Muay Thai	(Thailand) Petchakrit Gavingym	def.	(Thailand) Yodanucha Aekpattani	TKO (punch)	1	2:43	Yodanucha missed weight (124.2 lb).
Catchweight (118 lbs) Muay Thai	(England) Fergus Smith	def.	(Yemen) Zahran Al-Wesabi	KO (punches)	1	1:22	
Bantamweight Muay Thai	(Morocco) Hamza Rachid	def.	(Thailand) Kampeetewada Sitthikul	KO (punches)	2	0:47	
Catchweight (160 lbs) Muay Thai	(Iran) Yousef Hemati	def.	(Turkey) Kenan Bayramov	Decision (unanimous)	3	3:00	
Catchweight (117 lbs) Muay Thai	(Myanmar) Har Ling Om	def.	(Japan) Haruyuki Tanitsu	Decision (unanimous)	3	3:00	
Bantamweight MMA	(Australia) Alastair Volders	def.	(Uzbekistan) Asadbek Erkinov	TKO (head kick and punches)	2	0:14	
Catchweight (128 lbs) MMA	(Iran) Ali Afroogh	def.	(Philippines) Mawin Quirante	TKO (punches)	3	2:40	

== ONE Friday Fights 130 ==
ONE Friday Fights 130: Nonthachai vs. Şen
- Promotion: ONE Championship
- Date: October 24, 2025
- Venue: Lumpinee Boxing Stadium
- City: Bangkok, Thailand

ONE Friday Fights 130: Nonthachai vs. Şen (also known as ONE Lumpinee 130) was a combat sports event produced by ONE Championship that took place on October 24, 2025, at Lumpinee Boxing Stadium in Bangkok, Thailand.

=== background ===
A bantamweight Muay Thai bout between Nonthachai Jitmuangnon and Şoner Şen was headlined the event.

=== Bonus awards ===
The following fighters received $10,000 bonuses:

- Performance of the Night: Thapluang Petkiatpet, Sonrak Fairtex, Titus Proctor and Shoma Okumura

=== Results ===
ONE Friday Fights 130 (YouTube / Watch ONE)
Weight Class				Method	Round	Time	Notes
Bantamweight Muay Thai	(Thailand) Nonthachai Jitmuangnon	def.	(Turkey) Şoner Şen	Decision (majority)	3	3:00	
Atomweight Muay Thai	(Thailand) Songchainoi Kiatsongrit	def.	(Myanmar) Salai Htan Khee Shein	Decision (unanimous)	3	3:00	
Bantamweight Muay Thai	(Thailand) Chartmungkorn Chor.Hapayak	def.	(Laos) Lamnamkhong BS.Muaythai	Decision (unanimous)	3	3:00	
Strawweight Muay Thai	(Thailand) Singdam Kafefocus	def.	(Thailand) Teeyai Tded99	Decision (unanimous)	3	3:00	
Atomweight Muay Thai	(Thailand) Khunsuk Mor.Krungthepthonburi	def.	(Thailand) Tubtimthong Sor.Jor.Lekmuangnon	KO (punches)	2	2:42	Khunsuk missed weight (115.6 lb).
Flyweight Muay Thai	(Thailand) Thapluang Petkiatpet	def.	(Thailand) Fahmongkol Sor.Chokmeechai	KO (punches)	2	2:09	
Bantamweight Muay Thai	(Myanmar) Sonrak Fairtex	def.	(Thailand) Yamin P.K.Saenchai	KO (punch)	1	1:23	
Bantamweight Muay Thai	(Thailand) Detchawalit Silkmuaythai	def.	(Uruguay) Ivan Bodeant	KO (head kick)	1	2:32	Detchawalit missed weight (146 lb).
Strawweight Kickboxing	(Thailand) Petchsiam Jor.Pattreya	def.	(Japan) Ryuki Matsuda	Decision (unanimous)	3	3:00	
Bantamweight Muay Thai	(Sweden) Linus Bylander	def.	(Thailand) Saensak Supergirl Jaroonsak	Decision (unanimous)	3	3:00	
Lightweight Muay Thai	(New Zealand) Titus Proctor	def.	(China) Liu Quan	KO (knee and punches)	3	1:23	
Strawweight Kickboxing	(Japan) Shoma Okumura	def.	(England) Alfie Lynch	TKO (knee and punches)	1	2:50	

== ONE Friday Fights 131 ==
ONE Friday Fights 131: Suriyanlek vs. Decho 2
- Promotion: ONE Championship
- Date: October 31, 2025
- Venue: Lumpinee Boxing Stadium
- City: Bangkok, Thailand

ONE Friday Fights 131: Suriyanlek vs. Decho 2 (also known as ONE Lumpinee 131) was a combat sports event produced by ONE Championship that took place on October 31, 2025, at Lumpinee Boxing Stadium in Bangkok, Thailand.

=== background ===
A flyweight Muay Thai rematch between Suriyanlek Por.Yenying and Decho Por.Borirak was headlined the event. The pairing previously met at ONE Friday Fights 124 in September 2025, which Suriyanlek win by unanimous decision.

=== Bonus awards ===
The following fighters received $10,000 bonuses:

- Performance of the Night: Mohamed Taoufyq and Rustam Yunusov

=== Results ===
ONE Friday Fights 131 (YouTube / Watch ONE)
Weight Class				Method	Round	Time	Notes
Flyweight Muay Thai	(Thailand) Decho Por.Borirak	def.	(Thailand) Suriyanlek Por.Yenying	Decision (unanimous)	3	3:00	
Bantamweight Muay Thai	(Thailand) Krisana Daodenmuaythai	def.	(Thailand) Panrit Lukjaomaesaiwaree	Decision (unanimous)	3	3:00	
Bantamweight Muay Thai	(Thailand) Buakhiao Por.Paoin	def.	(Thailand) Maemmot Sor.Salacheep	Decision (split)	3	3:00	
Flyweight Muay Thai	(Morocco) Mohamed Taoufyq	def.	(Thailand) Petmuangnua Tongkawchiangmai	TKO (elbow)	2	1:30	
Women's Atomweight Muay Thai	(Brazil) Gabriele Moram	def.	(Thailand) Nongfahsai TOP P.K.Saenchai	Decision (unanimous)	3	3:00	
Atomweight Muay Thai	(Thailand) Daodaeng Annymuaythai	def.	(Thailand) Ikkyusan Sor.Salacheep	Decision (unanimous)	3	3:00	
Flyweight Muay Thai	(Russia) Rustam Yunusov	def.	(Thailand) Phetsukumvit Boybangna	KO (punch)	1	1:45	
Bantamweight Kickboxing	(France) Arthur Klopp	def.	(China) Zhu Shuai	Decision (split)	3	3:00	
Bantamweight Kickboxing	(Venezuela) Gabriel Pereira	def.	(Japan) Taku	Decision (unanimous)	3	3:00	
Featherweight MMA	(France) Alexandre Khan	vs.	(Japan) Seiya Matsuda	NC (accidental groin strike)	2	2:54	Accidental groin strike rendered Matsuda unable to continue
Women's Atomweight Muay Thai	(Hong Kong) Tsz Ching Phoebe Lo	def.	(France) Madhyson Klatt	Decision (unanimous)	3	3:00	
Flyweight MMA	(Azerbaijan) Mehrab Mammadzada	def.	(Turkmenistan) Shazada Ataev	Submission (rear-naked choke)	3	3:58	

== ONE Friday Fights 132 ==
ONE Friday Fights 132: Kompetch vs. Ondash
- Promotion: ONE Championship
- Date: November 7, 2025
- Venue: Lumpinee Boxing Stadium
- City: Bangkok, Thailand

ONE Friday Fights 132: Kompetch vs. Ondash (also known as ONE Lumpinee 132) was a combat sports event produced by ONE Championship that took place on November 7, 2025, at Lumpinee Boxing Stadium in Bangkok, Thailand.

=== background ===
A flyweight Muay Thai bout between Kompetch Fairtex and Abdallah Ondash was headlined the event.

=== Bonus awards ===
The following fighters received $10,000 bonuses:

- Performance of the Night: Abdallah Ondash, YodUdon BS.Muaythai, Pet Suanluangrodyok, Otis Waghorn and Norika Ryu

=== Results ===
ONE Friday Fights 132 (YouTube / Watch ONE)
Weight Class				Method	Round	Time	Notes
Flyweight Muay Thai	(Lebanon) Abdallah Ondash	def.	(Thailand) Kompetch Fairtex	KO (punch)	3	0:26	
Women's Atomweight Muay Thai	(Myanmar) Vero Nika	def.	(China) Li Mingrui	Decision (split)	3	3:00	
Flyweight Muay Thai	(Thailand) Khunpon Aekmuangnon	def.	(Thailand) Petnakian Sor.Nakian	Decision (unanimous)	3	3:00	
Atomweight Muay Thai	(Thailand) YodUdon BS.Muaythai	def.	(Thailand) Petkriangkrai Jitmuangnon	TKO (punch)	2	2:53	
Atomweight Muay Thai	(Thailand) Pet Suanluangrodyok	def.	(Thailand) Fahlikit Nayokjoyprajin	KO (punch)	2	2:30	
Flyweight Muay Thai	(Thailand) Khunponnoi Sor.Sommai	def.	(Myanmar) Thant Zin	Decision (unanimous)	3	3:00	
Featherweight Muay Thai	(England) Otis Waghorn	def.	(Bulgaria) Rado Popa	TKO (elbows and knees)	1	1:13	
Strawweight Muay Thai	(Myanmar) Soe Naung Oo	def.	(Thailand) Maisangngern Sor.Yingcharoenkarnchang	Decision (unanimous)	3	3:00	
Strawweight Muay Thai	(Morocco) Walid Snoussi	vs.	(Japan) Jurai Ishii	NC (accidental eye poke)	1	3:00	Accidental eye poke rendered Ishii unable to continue.
Lightweight MMA	(Sweden) Oliver Axelsson	def.	(Brazil) Jean Carlos Pereira	Submission (arm triangle choke)	1	1:34	
Women's Strawweight MMA	(Japan) Norika Ryu	def.	(Germany) Adele Niebel	Submission (armbar)	1	2:09	

== ONE Friday Fights 133 ==
ONE Friday Fights 133: Pompet vs. Thom
- Promotion: ONE Championship
- Date: November 14, 2025
- Venue: Lumpinee Boxing Stadium
- City: Bangkok, Thailand

ONE Friday Fights 133: Pompet vs. Thom (also known as ONE Lumpinee 133) was a combat sports event produced by ONE Championship that took place on November 14, 2025, at Lumpinee Boxing Stadium in Bangkok, Thailand.

=== background ===
A flyweight Muay Thai bout between Pompet Panthonggym and Gregor Thom was headlined the event.

=== Bonus awards ===
The following fighters received $10,000 bonuses:

- Performance of the Night: Pompet Panthonggym, Valerii Strungari and Payak Saksatoon

=== Results ===
ONE Friday Fights 133 (YouTube / Watch ONE)
Weight Class				Method	Round	Time	Notes
Flyweight Muay Thai	(Thailand) Pompet Panthonggym	def.	(Scotland) Gregor Thom	TKO (punch)	2	2:24	
Flyweight Muay Thai	(Moldova) Valerii Strungari	def.	(Thailand) Sanit Aekmuangnon	KO (punch)	3	1:39	
Strawweight Muay Thai	(Thailand) Rittidet Lukjaoporongtom	def.	(Iran) Majid Karimi	Decision (unanimous)	3	3:00	
Flyweight Muay Thai	(Thailand) Sanpet Sor.Salacheep	def.	(Thailand) Petmuangsri Tded99	Decision (unanimous)	3	3:00	
Flyweight Muay Thai	(Thailand) Sirichok Sor.Sommai	def.	(Thailand) Klarob Nuikafeboran	Decision (unanimous)	3	3:00	
Atomweight Muay Thai	(Thailand) Payak Saksatoon	def.	(Thailand) Ded Sor.Chokmeechai	KO (punch)	1	1:10	
Strawweight Muay Thai	(Thailand) Chartpayak Saksatoon	def.	(Uzbekistan) Samandar Khasanov	Decision (unanimous)	3	3:00	
Featherweight Muay Thai	(Thailand) Petkhaokradong Lukjaomaesaithong	def.	(Morocco) Ayoub El Khadraoui	KO (punch)	1	0:53	Petkhaokradong missed weight (156.6 lb).
Flyweight Muay Thai	(Mexico) Anuar Cisneros	def.	(Morocco) Walid Sakhraji	Decision (unanimous)	3	3:00	Sakhraji missed weight (138.2 lb).
Atomweight Kickboxing	(Japan) Toma Kuroda	def.	(Russia) Kirill Chizhik	Decision (unanimous)	3	3:00	
Bantamweight MMA	(France) Mathieu Greco	def.	(Mongolia) Erdenebayar Tsolmon	TKO (punches and knees)	1	2:41	
Flyweight MMA	(Vietnam) Viet Anh Do	def.	(Japan) Ryo Hirayama	TKO (punch)	1	2:48	

== ONE Friday Fights 134 ==
ONE Friday Fights 134: Yodlekpet vs. Mammadov
- Promotion: ONE Championship
- Date: November 21, 2025
- Venue: Lumpinee Boxing Stadium
- City: Bangkok, Thailand

ONE Friday Fights 134: Yodlekpet vs. Mammadov (also known as ONE Lumpinee 134) was a combat sports event produced by ONE Championship that took place on November 21, 2025, at Lumpinee Boxing Stadium in Bangkok, Thailand.

=== background ===
A flyweight Muay Thai bout between Yodlekpet Or.Atchariya and Anar Mammadov was headlined the event.

=== Bonus awards ===
The following fighters received $10,000 bonuses:

- Performance of the Night: Islay Erika Bomogao and Hyuga

=== Results ===
ONE Friday Fights 134 (YouTube / Watch ONE)
Weight Class				Method	Round	Time	Notes
Flyweight Muay Thai	(Thailand) Yodlekpet Or.Atchariya	def.	(Azerbaijan) Anar Mammadov	Decision (unanimous)	3	3:00	
Bantamweight Muay Thai	(Thailand) Dedduanglek Tded99	def.	(Thailand) Wuttikrai Wor.Chakrawut	Decision (unanimous)	3	3:00	
Bantamweight Muay Thai	(Italy) Lenny Blasi	def.	(Russia) Ilyas Musaev	Decision (unanimous)	3	3:00	Musaev missed weight (149 lb).
Flyweight Muay Thai	(England) Jacob Thompson	def.	(Thailand) Yodseksan Rodsuayjajed	Decision (unanimous)	3	3:00	
Flyweight Muay Thai	(Thailand) Petnamtan Vwingym	def.	(Thailand) Aomsin Por.Patcharawat	Decision (unanimous)	3	3:00	Petnamtan missed weight (130.6 lb).
Strawweight Muay Thai	(Thailand) Manat Tor.Yaemsuan	def.	(Thailand) Banlangngern Aor.Yuttachai	Decision (split)	3	3:00	
Featherweight Muay Thai	(France) Elies Abdelali	def.	(Russia) Alaverdi Ramazanov	TKO (leg injury)	1	0:29	
Women's Atomweight Muay Thai	(Philippines) Islay Erika Bomogao	def.	(Thailand) Ploychompoo P.U.Phabai	KO (punch to the body)	2	0:48	
Flyweight Muay Thai	(Russia) Tagir Khalilov	vs.	(Japan) Shimon Yoshinari	NC (accidental eye poke)	2	1:22	Accidental eye poke rendered Khalilov unable to continue.
Flyweight Kickboxing	(Japan) Hyuga	def.	(China) Wang Yuhan	KO (knee to the body)	1	1:20	
Strawweight MMA	(Australia) Rory Turner	def.	(Philippines) Noah Cabreros	TKO (punches)	3	4:52	
Women's Atomweight MMA	(Australia) Kim Tran	def.	(Kyrgyzstan) Almagul Zhorobekova	KO (elbow)	2	2:31	

== ONE Friday Fights 135 ==
ONE Friday Fights 135: Worapon vs. Lobo
- Promotion: ONE Championship
- Date: November 28, 2025
- Venue: Lumpinee Boxing Stadium
- City: Bangkok, Thailand

ONE Friday Fights 135: Worapon vs. Lobo (also known as ONE Lumpinee 135) was a combat sports event produced by ONE Championship that took place on November 28, 2025, at Lumpinee Boxing Stadium in Bangkok, Thailand.

=== background ===
A bantamweight Muay Thai bout between Worapon Lukjaoporongtom and Julio Lobo was headlined the event.

=== Bonus awards ===
The following fighters received $10,000 bonuses:

- Performance of the Night: Tom Keogh and Kojiro Shiba

=== Results ===
ONE Friday Fights 135 (YouTube / Watch ONE)
Weight Class				Method	Round	Time	Notes
Bantamweight Muay Thai	(Brazil) Julio Lobo	def.	(Thailand) Worapon Lukjaoporongtom	Decision (unanimous)	3	3:00	
Bantamweight Muay Thai	(Thailand) Kongklai Sor.Sommai	def.	(United States) Kendu Irving	Decision (majority)	3	3:00	
Flyweight Muay Thai	(Thailand) Panpadej N.F.Looksuan	def.	(Thailand) Isannuea Chotbangsaen	Decision (unanimous)	3	3:00	
Atomweight Muay Thai	(Thailand) Nittikorn JP.Power	def.	(France) Nahyan Mohammed	Decision (unanimous)	3	3:00	
Bantamweight Muay Thai	(Thailand) Suksawat P.K.Saenchai	def.	(Thailand) Guyasit Singha Mawynn	Decision (split)	3	3:00	
Women's Atomweight Muay Thai	(Thailand) Nongam Fairtex	def.	(Thailand) Tangtang Sor.Dechapan	Decision (split)	3	3:00	
Bantamweight Kickboxing	(Thailand) Lamnamoonlek Or.Atchariya	def.	(Spain) Javier Galvez	Decision (unanimous)	3	3:00	
Featherweight Muay Thai	(Republic of Ireland) Tom Keogh	def.	(Iran) Mahan Fotouhi	KO (punch to the body)	1	2:11	
Women's Atomweight Muay Thai	(Hong Kong) Wang Tsz Ching	def.	(Poland) Oliwia Dabrowski	Decision (split)	3	3:00	
Strawweight Kickboxing	(Japan) Kojiro Shiba	def.	(Thailand) Silachai Sor.Jor.Danrayong	KO (punch to the body)	1	1:04	
Flyweight MMA	(Russia) Chayan Oorzhak	def.	(Qatar) Imran Satiev	TKO (elbows and punches)	2	3:45	
Strawweight MMA	(India) Nazareth Lalthazuala	def.	(Japan) Masaki Suzuki	KO (punches)	1	0:16	

== ONE Friday Fights 136 ==
ONE Friday Fights 136: Petkhaokradong vs. Kelat
- Promotion: ONE Championship
- Date: December 12, 2025
- Venue: Lumpinee Boxing Stadium
- City: Bangkok, Thailand

ONE Friday Fights 136: Petkhaokradong vs. Kelat (also known as ONE Lumpinee 136) was a combat sports event produced by ONE Championship that took place on December 12, 2025, at Lumpinee Boxing Stadium in Bangkok, Thailand.

=== background ===
A flyweight Kickboxing bout between Panpayak Jitmuangnon and Zhao Chongyang was scheduled to headline the event. but the bout was cancelled due Panpayak having an illness, Therefore, the Muay thai bout between Petkhaokradong Lukjaomaesaithong and Ali Kelat headlined the event.

=== Bonus awards ===
The following fighters received $10,000 bonuses:

- Performance of the Night: Ali Kelat, Kraithong P.U.Phabai, Hiroyuki and Lee Seung-chul

=== Results ===
ONE Friday Fights 136 (YouTube / Watch ONE)
Weight Class				Method	Round	Time	Notes
Lightweight Muay Thai	(Turkey) Ali Kelat	def.	(Thailand) Petkhaokradong Lukjaomaesaithong	KO (punches)	1	1:41	
Strawweight Muay Thai	(Thailand) Suesat Manopgym	def.	(Thailand) Chokpreecha P.K.TomTK.Alaiyont	Decision (unanimous)	3	3:00	
Atomweight Muay Thai	(Thailand) Chatpichit Sor.Sor.Toipadriew	def.	(Myanmar) Har Ling Om	Decision (unanimous)	3	3:00	
Flyweight Muay Thai	(Thailand) Kraithong P.U.Phabai	def.	(Thailand) Thapluang Petkiatpet	KO (punches)	1	2:08	
Women's Strawweight Muay Thai	(Morocco) Ichrak Laroussi	def.	(United States) Sarah Gohier	KO (punch to the body)	1	1:07	
Lightweight Muay Thai	(Russia) Maksim Bakhtin	def.	(Iran) Abolfazl Alipourandi	Decision (split)	3	3:00	
Flyweight Muay Thai	(China) Zhang Jinhu	def.	(Iran) Amir Naseri	Decision (unanimous)	3	3:00	
Flyweight Muay Thai	(Brazil) Israel Dos Santos	def.	(Japan) Takuma Ota	Decision (unanimous)	3	3:00	
Strawweight Muay Thai	(Japan) Hiroyuki	def.	(Thailand) Petdam SitErawan	TKO (punch)	1	2:27	
Strawweight MMA	(South Korea) Lee Seung-chul	def.	(Indonesia) Cueng Naibaho	Submission (rear-naked choke)	1	3:02	
Bantamweight Submission Grappling	(England) Jack Sear	def.	(Japan) Shoya Ishiguro	Decision (unanimous)	1	10:00	

== ONE Friday Fights 137 ==
ONE Friday Fights 137: Tawanchai vs. Liu
- Promotion: ONE Championship
- Date: December 19, 2025
- Venue: Lumpinee Boxing Stadium
- City: Bangkok, Thailand

ONE Friday Fights 137: Tawanchai vs. Liu (also known as ONE Lumpinee 137) was a combat sports event produced by ONE Championship that took place on December 19, 2025, at Lumpinee Boxing Stadium in Bangkok, Thailand.

=== background ===
A featherweight Kickboxing bout between current ONE Featherweight Muay Thai World Champion Tawanchai P.K.Saenchai and Liu Mengyang was headlined the event.

=== Bonus awards ===
The following fighters received $10,000 bonuses:

- Performance of the Night: Sam-A Gaiyanghadao, Mohammad Siasarani, Yod-IQ Or.Pimonsri, Gingsanglek Tor.Laksong, Suriyanlek Por.Yenying and Duangdawnoi Looksaikongdin

=== Results ===
ONE Friday Fights 137 (YouTube / Watch ONE)
Weight Class				Method	Round	Time	Notes
Featherweight Kickboxing	(China) Liu Mengyang	def.	(Thailand) Tawanchai P.K.Saenchai	TKO (leg injury)	1	0:52	
Featherweight Muay Thai	(Thailand) PTT Apichartfarm	def.	(Thailand) Kulabdam Sor.Jor.Piek-U-Thai	Decision (majority)	3	3:00	
Strawweight Muay Thai	(Thailand) Sam-A Gaiyanghadao	def.	(Thailand) Jaosuayai Mor.Krungthepthonburi	Decision (unanimous)	3	3:00	
Bantamweight Muay Thai	(Thailand) Pakorn P.K.Saenchai	def.	(Thailand) Suablack Tor.Pran49	Decision (unanimous)	3	3:00	
Featherweight Muay Thai	(Iran) Mohammad Siasarani	def.	(Thailand) Jo Nattawut	KO (punch)	2	1:39	
Featherweight Muay Thai	(Thailand) Yod-IQ Or.Pimonsri	def.	(Russia) Alexey Balyko	KO (head kick)	1	2:04	
Strawweight Kickboxing	(China) Zhang Peimian	def.	(Thailand) Thongpoon P.K.Saenchai	Decision (unanimous)	3	3:00	
Flyweight Muay Thai	(Thailand) Gingsanglek Tor.Laksong	def.	(Thailand) Suriyanlek Por.Yenying	Decision (unanimous)	3	3:00	
Flyweight Muay Thai	(Japan) Shimon Yoshinari	def.	(Thailand) Dedduanglek Tded99	Decision (unanimous)	3	3:00	
Women's Atomweight Muay Thai	(Thailand) Duangdawnoi Looksaikongdin	def.	(Canada) Regan Gowing	KO (punch)	2	0:36	
Atomweight Muay Thai	(Japan) Ryuya Okuwaki	def.	(Thailand) Pet Suanluangrodyok	Decision (unanimous)	3	3:00	
Strawweight Muay Thai	(Thailand) Denkriangkrai Singha Mawynn	def.	(Japan) Asahi Shinagawa	Decision (unanimous)	3	3:00	

== See also ==
- List of current ONE fighters
- 2025 in UFC
- 2025 in Professional Fighters League
- 2025 in Cage Warriors
- 2025 in Legacy Fighting Alliance
- 2025 in Rizin Fighting Federation
- 2025 in LUX Fight League
- 2025 in Oktagon MMA
- 2025 in Brave Combat Federation
- 2025 in Glory
- 2025 in K-1
- 2025 in RISE
- 2025 in Romanian kickboxing
