= Aslamjon Ortikov =

Uzbek muay thai fighter

- Born: February 16, 2003 (age 23); Uzbekistan
- Other names: Aslam T.C.Muaythai (อัสลาม ที.ซี.มวยไทย)
- Nickname: El Pantera
- Height: 174 cm (5 ft 9 in)
- Weight: 61 kg (134 lb; 9.6 st)
- Style: Muay Thai
- Stance: Orthodox
- Fighting out of: Bangkok, Thailand
- Team: Sport Club Shakhriyor / TC Muaythai
- Trainer: Temur Kurbanov

Kickboxing record
- Total: 26
- Wins: 24
- By knockout: 11
- Losses: 2
- Draws: 0

Aslamjon Ortikov (born February 16, 2003) is an Uzbek Muay thai kickboxer. He currently competes in the Flyweight division of ONE Championship, where he is a one-time ONE Flyweight Muay Thai title challenger. As of September 22, 2026, Ortikov is ranked #1 in ONE's Flyweight Muay Thai rankings.

== Biography and career ==
Ortikov started training in kickboxing and Muay Thai at the age of 8, he followed his brothers to a boxing gym near their home in Uzbekistan. He had his first amateur fight after a month of training and amassed over 200 fights before turning 18. In 2022 Ortikov won the WMF Amateur World Championship and decided to stay in Thailand to pursue his professional career.

On October 20, 2023, Ortikov defeated Pethuahin Jitmuangnon by third round technical knockout at ONE Friday Fights 37.

Ortikov defeated Chatanan Sor.Jor.Joyprajin by first round knockout at ONE Friday Fights 43 on December 1, 2023.

On March 8, 2024, Ortikov defeated Watcharapon SinghaMawynn by unanimous decision at ONE Friday Fights 54.

On November 22, 2024, Ortikov defeated Pompet P.K.Saenchai by unanimous decision at ONE Friday Fights 88.

On May 9, 2024, Ortikov defeated Dedduanglek WankhongohmMBK by unanimous decision at ONE Friday Fights 107.

On October 3, 2025, Ortikov defeated Kongthoranee Sor.Sommai by unanimous decision at ONE Fight Night 36.

On May 16, 2026, Ortikov defeated Jhordan Estupiñan by third round technical knockout at ONE Fight Night 43.

Ortikov was scheduled to face Asadula Imangazaliev for the vacant ONE Flyweight Muay Thai World Championship at ONE Friday Fights 160 on June 26, 2026.

== Titles and accomplishments ==
=== Professional ===
- ONE Championship
  - Performance of the Night (Three times)
    - vs. Chatanan Sor.Jor.Joyprajin, Yodtongthai Sor.Sommai, Phetsukumvit Boybangna

=== Amateur ===
- World Muaythai Federation
  - 2022 W.M.F World Championship -57 kg (gold)

== Fight record ==
Professional Muay Thai and Kickboxing record
24 Wins (11 (T)KOs), 2 Losses, 0 Draw
Date	Result	Opponent	Event	Location	Method	Round	Time
2026-11-20	Loss	(Russia) Asadula Imangazaliev	ONE The Inner Circle 39, Lumpinee Stadium	Bangkok, Thailand	Decision (Split)	5	3:00
2026 ONE Flyweight Muay Thai World Grand Prix Quarterfinal. For the ONE Flyweight Muay Thai World Championship.
2026-06-26	Loss	(Russia) Asadula Imangazaliev	ONE The Inner Circle 20, Lumpinee Stadium	Bangkok, Thailand	Decision (Split)	5	3:00
For the vacant ONE Flyweight Muay Thai World Championship.
2026-05-16	Win	(Colombia) Jhordan Estupiñan	ONE Fight Night 43	Bangkok, Thailand	TKO (3 Knockdowns)	2	2:06
2025-10-03	Win	(Thailand) Kongthoranee Sor.Sommai	ONE Fight Night 36	Bangkok, Thailand	Decision (Unanimous)	3	3:00
2025-06-27	Win	(Thailand) Phetsukumvit Boybangna	ONE Friday Fights 114, Lumpinee Stadium	Bangkok, Thailand	KO (Body kick)	3	2:33
2025-05-09	Win	(Thailand) Dedduanglek Wankhongohm MBK	ONE Friday Fights 107, Lumpinee Stadium	Bangkok, Thailand	Decision (Unanimous)	3	3:00
2024-11-22	Win	(Thailand) Pompet P.K.Saenchai	ONE Friday Fights 88, Lumpinee Stadium	Bangkok, Thailand	Decision (Unanimous)	3	3:00
2024-09-06	Win	(Thailand) Yodtongthai Sor.Sommai	ONE Friday Fights 78, Lumpinee Stadium	Bangkok, Thailand	TKO (Punches)	3	2:15
2024-03-08	Win	(Thailand) Watcharapon Singha Mawynn	ONE Friday Fights 54, Lumpinee Stadium	Bangkok, Thailand	Decision (Unanimous)	3	3:00
2023-12-01	Win	(Thailand) Chatanan Sor.Jor.Joyprajin	ONE Friday Fights 43, Lumpinee Stadium	Bangkok, Thailand	KO (High kick)	1	2:33
2023-10-20	Win	(Thailand) Pethuahin Jitmuangnon	ONE Friday Fights 37, Lumpinee Stadium	Bangkok, Thailand	TKO (Left hook & head kick)	3	0:50
2023-07-14	Win	(Thailand) Kaotaem Fairtex	ONE Friday Fights 25, Lumpinee Stadium	Bangkok, Thailand	Decision (Unanimous)	3	3:00
2023-06-17	Win	(Thailand) Jingreedthong Kilasport	Fairtex Fight Extreme, Lumpinee Stadium	Bangkok, Thailand	KO (Spinning back elbow)	1	1:00
2023-01-07	Win	(Thailand) Yodtanong NoppadejGym	Fairtex Fight Extreme, Lumpinee Stadium	Bangkok, Thailand	Decision (Unanimous)	3	3:00
2022-12-03	Win	(Iran) Soruch Akbari	Fairtex Fight Extreme, Lumpinee Stadium	Bangkok, Thailand	Decision (Unanimous)	3	3:00
2022-11-20	Win	(Uganda) Josiah Lumuny		Pattaya, Thailand	Decision (Unanimous)	3	3:00
2022-06-19	Win	(Uzbekistan) Diyorbek Erkinov	PFC 1	Uzbekistan	TKO (Elbow)	2	2:18
2022-02-22	Win	(Uzbekistan) Sherzod Komiljonov		Uzbekistan	KO (Left cross)	1	
2021-12-29	Win	(Uzbekistan) Faxriddin Hasanov		Uzbekistan	Decision (Unanimous)	3	3:00
2021-11-14	Win	(Tajikistan) Abdurahmon Yunusov	Muay Thai Battle of the Strong 2	Samarkand, Uzbekistan	Decision	3	3:00
2021-09-26	Win	(Uzbekistan) Qobil Hojiev		Shahrisabz, Uzbekistan	KO (High kick)	2	
2021-06-25	Win	(United Kingdom) Joshua Ridgwell	UAM Muaythai Night 6	Abu Dhabi, UAE	Decision (Unanimous)	3	3:00
2021-04-11	Win	(Tajikistan) Muhammad Aabdurakhomonov	Muay Thai Battle of the Strong	Samarkand, Uzbekistan	KO (Spinning back fist)	2	
Legend: Win Loss Draw/No contest Notes

== See also ==
- List of male kickboxers
