= Yodtongthai Sor.Sommai =

American Muay Thai fighter

- Born: Piyawat Bungna; April 19, 1993 (age 33); Bang Kaeo District, Phatthalung Province, Thailand
- Other names: Yodtongthai Por.Telakun (ยอดทองไท ป.เตละกุล); Yodtongthai Kiatjaroenchai; Yodthongthai T.M.B. Gym; Yodthongthai Tor.Mahahin
- Nickname: "The Classic Cat With 9 Lives" (แมวเก้าชีวิตจอมคลาสสิค)
- Height: 173 cm (5 ft 8 in)
- Division: Featherweight; Super featherweight Lightweight; Super Lightweight
- Style: Muay Thai; Muay Fimeu
- Stance: Orthodox
- Fighting out of: Bangkok, Thailand
- Team: Por.Telakun (formerly); Kiatjaroenchai (formerly); T.M.B. Gym (formerly); Sor.Sommai (2020-present)
- Years active: > 25 years

Other information
- Children: Nong Aomsin (daughter)

Piyawat Bungna (Thai: ปิยวัฒน์ บุงนา; born 19 April 1993), also known as Yodtongthai Sor.Sommai (Thai: ยอดทองไท ส.สมหมาย) is a Thai Muay Thai fighter. He currently trains and fights out of Sor.Sommai gym in the Bang Kapi District of Bangkok. As of December 2021, Yodtongthai is ranked 22 at Lightweight by the World Muay Thai Organization (WMO) after over a year out of the ring. He is nicknamed as "The Classic Cat With 9 Lives" since his fighting style is similar to that of past Muay Thai fighters as well as his success after returning from a hiatus in 2016.

== Biography and career ==
Bungna was born in Bang Kaeo District, Phatthalung Province on April 19, 1993. He began his Muay Thai career at around 5–6 years old. He fights under the ring name of Yodthongthai. He won his first prestigious championship in 2007 after beating Thanonchai Thanakorngym for the Rajadamnern junior bantamweight title and won the Rajadamnern flyweight title in 2009. He formerly trained out of and represented the Por.Telakun, T.M.B. Gym, and Kiatjaroenchai Muay Thai camps. He is primarily an orthodox stance fighter.

Yodthongthai cemented his status as a well-known fighter in the Thai Muay Thai circuit in 2014 when he had a successful series of fights against those who were considered star fighters such as Saen Parunchai for a 2 million baht side-bet and Yutthakan Phet.Por.Tor.Or before taking a 14-month hiatus. When he resumed his Muay Thai career in 2016, he was still matched up against other yodmuay (elite fighters) such as Phetmorakot Teeded99 and Thappabut SitUbon and was able to beat them. He was nicknamed by the Thai media as "The Classic Cat With 9 Lives" (แมวเก้าชีวิตจอมคลาสสิค) in reference to his "Muay Classic" fighting style which resembles that of Muay Fimeu fighters from the 1980s to 1990s and also due to his successes after returning from his first hiatus.

In 2018, his performance as a fighter declined, thus he lost four fights in a row and caused audiences to doubt that he could return to his former status as a yodmuay. However, in 2019, Yodthongthai had another successful run against highly regarded opponents including Duamsompong Jitmuangnon, Jompichit Chuwattana, and Kochasan Wor.Wiwattanawanon. He took another hiatus from Muay Thai in mid 2020 due to COVID-19 quarantine protocols in Thailand. He temporarily worked as a fruit vendor behind the Koh Suea Temple in the Hat Yai District where his business was supported by Muay Thai fans. He later began training in and representing the Sor.Sommai gym in Bangkok, becoming teammates with Saeksan Or. Kwanmuang and Kongthoranee Sor.Sommai. After he returned from his second hiatus, he won the Rajadamnern lightweight championship in late 2020.

Yodthongchai is currently a father to Nong Aomsin, his daughter.

He began competing in the Muay Thai division of ONE Championship in late 2023, meaning that he would be fighting under a different scoring system and ruleset as opposed to the traditional Muay Thai style that he competed in for most of his career. After losing to the Lebanese Omar El Halabi in his first ONE Championship fight, he revised his fighting style for their rematch in February 2024. He defended against most of El Halabi's strikes and consistently threw counters, eventually resulting in a TKO victory by way of punches. Yodthongthai was rewarded a ฿350,000 bonus for the win, the largest sum of money he has received in his 25-year-long Muay Thai career. He divided the bonus to his parents, his debts, and his daughter's future scholarship.

He is currently fighting between 128 and 141 pounds (58 and 64 kg).

== Titles and accomplishments ==
Rajadamnern Stadium

- 2009 Rajadamnern Stadium 108 lbs Champion
- 2010 Rajadamnern Stadium 115 lbs Champion
- 2020 Rajadamnern Stadium 130 lbs Champion

Onesongchai

- S1 World 100 lbs Champion

== Fight record ==
Muay Thai Record
Date	Result	Opponent	Event	Location	Method	Round	Time
2025-12-13	Loss	(Thailand) Kiewpayak Jitmuangnon	Rajadamnern World Series	Bangkok, Thailand	Decision (Split)	3	3:00
2025-10-01	Win	(Thailand) Watcharapon Singmawynn	Muay Thai Palangmai, Rajadamnern Stadium	Bangkok, Thailand	KO	3	
2025-08-27	Win	(Thailand) Apiwat Sor.Sommai	Muay Thai Palangmai, Rajadamnern Stadium	Bangkok, Thailand	Decision	5	3:00
2025-07-23	Win	(Thailand) Kaewkangwan V.K. Khaoyai	Muay Thai Palangmai, Rajadamnern Stadium	Bangkok, Thailand	Decision	5	3:00
2025-05-23	Loss	(Thailand) Denkriangkrai Singha Mawynn	ONE Friday Fights 109, Lumpinee Stadium	Bangkok, Thailand	Decision (Unanimous)	3	3:00
2025-03-26	Win	(United States) Jalil Barnes	Muay Thai Palangmai, Rajadamnern Stadium	Bangkok, Thailand	Decision	5	3:00
2024-11-30	Loss	(Thailand) Tomyungkung Pakornpornsurin	JaoMuayThai, Omnoi Stadium	Samut Sakhon, Thailand	KO (Head kick)	2	
2024-09-06	Loss	(Uzbekistan) Aslamjon Ortikov	ONE Friday Fights 78, Lumpinee Stadium	Bangkok, Thailand	TKO (Punches)	3	2:15
2024-07-12	Win	(Thailand) ET Wankhongohm MBK	ONE Friday Fights 70, Lumpinee Stadium	Bangkok, Thailand	TKO (Knee injury)	1	2:06
2024-04-19	Win	(Thailand) Petchnamngam PK.SaenchaiMuayThaiGym	ONE Friday Fights 59, Lumpinee Stadium	Bangkok, Thailand	Decision (Unanimous)	3	3:00
2024-02-16	Win	(Lebanon) Omar El Halabi	ONE Friday Fights 52, Lumpinee Stadium	Bangkok, Thailand	TKO	2	1:35
2023-12-15	Loss	(Lebanon) Omar El Halabi	ONE Friday Fights 45, Lumpinee Stadium	Bangkok, Thailand	Decision (Unanimous)	3	3:00
2023-09-23	Win	(Thailand) Sakchainoi MUden	Takhli Muay Thai Fight Superstar Muay Thai	Nakhon Sawan province, Thailand	TKO	3	
2023-06-14	Win	(Thailand) Petchmanee Sor.Jaruwan	Muay Thai Palangmai, Rajadamnern Stadium	Bangkok, Thailand	Decision	5	3:00
2023-04-05	Win	(Thailand) Chai SorSor.Toipadriew	Muay Thai Palangmai, Rajadamnern Stadium	Bangkok, Thailand	Decision	5	3:00
2023-02-12	Loss	(Thailand) Kaewkangwan Priwayo	Muaydee VitheeThai + Jitmuangnon, Or.Tor.Gor.3 Stadium	Nonthaburi, Thailand	KO (punch and knee)	4	
2022-12-20	Loss	(Thailand) Kaewmongkol Priwayo	Muay Thai Lumpinee Pitaktam, Lumpinee Stadium	Bangkok, Thailand	Decision	5	3:00
2022-11-09	Win	(Thailand) Gingsanglek Tor.Laksong	Muay Thai Palangmai, Rajadamnern Stadium	Bangkok, Thailand	DQ (kick to a downed opponent)	2	
2022-09-17	Win	(Thailand) Ploywittaya Petchsimuen	Hippy Fight	Nakhon Si Thammarat province, Thailand	Decision	5	3:00
2022-08-20	Win	(Thailand) Nungubon Sitchefboontham	SuekJaoMuayThai, Siam Omnoi Stadium	Samut Sakhon, Thailand	Decision	5	3:00
2022-06-25	Win	(Thailand) Detduanglek Tded99	SuekJaoMuayThai, Siam Omnoi Stadium	Samut Sakhon, Thailand	Decision	5	3:00
2022-03-30	Loss	(Thailand) Phetwason Boybangna	Muay Thai Palangmai, Rajadamnern Stadium	Bangkok, Thailand	Decision	5	3:00
2022-01-01	Loss	(Thailand) Phetpangan Mor.Ratanabandit	SuekJaoMuayThai, Omnoi Stadium	Bangkok, Thailand	Decision	5	3:00
2020-12-03	Win	(Thailand) Phetsukumvit Boybangna	Rajadamnern Stadium	Bangkok, Thailand	Decision	5	3:00
Wins the vacant Rajadamnern Stadium 130 lbs title
2020-10-14	Win	(Thailand) Berkban Jonuvo	Rajadamnern Stadium	Bangkok, Thailand	Decision	5	3:00
2020-09-02	Win	(Thailand) Chankrit Or.Pimonsri	Rajadamnern Stadium	Bangkok, Thailand	Decision	5	3:00
2020-03-12	Win	(Thailand) Yodkhuntab Sor.Kor.Sungnaigym	Rajadamnern Stadium	Bangkok, Thailand	Decision	5	3:00
2020-02-05	Loss	(Thailand) Phetmanee Por.Lakboon	Rajadamnern Stadium	Bangkok, Thailand	Decision	5	3:00
2019-12-26	Win	(Thailand) Duangsompong Jitmuangnon	Rajadamnern Stadium	Bangkok, Thailand	Decision	5	3:00
2019-11-20	Loss	(Thailand) Lamnamoonlek Tded99	Rajadamnern Stadium	Bangkok, Thailand	Decision	5	3:00
2019-09-10	Win	(Thailand) Extra SitWorapon	Lumpinee Stadium	Bangkok, Thailand	KO (elbow)	1	
2019-08-16	Loss	(Thailand) Ploywitthaya Nayokwitthungsong	Upcountry	Thailand	Decision	5	3:00
2019-05-30	Win	(Thailand) Theppabut SitUbon	Rajadamnern Stadium	Bangkok, Thailand	Decision	5	3:00
2019-04-25	Win	(Thailand) Moradokphet PhetyindeeAcademy	Rajadamnern Stadium	Bangkok, Thailand	Decision	5	3:00
2019-03-18	Win	(Thailand) Khochasarn Wor.Wiwattananon	Rajadamnern Stadium	Bangkok, Thailand	KO	4	
2019-02-07	Win	(Thailand) Jompichit Chuwattana	Rajadamnern Stadium	Bangkok, Thailand	Decision	5	3:00
2018-07-29	Loss	(Thailand) Sibsaen Tor.Eawcharoentongphuket	Channel 7 Stadium	Bangkok, Thailand	Decision	5	3:00
2018-06-02	Loss	(Thailand) Theppabut SitUbon	Lumpinee Stadium	Bangkok, Thailand	Decision	5	3:00
2018-04-22	Loss	(Thailand) Sakchainoi MU.Den	Channel 7 Stadium	Bangkok, Thailand	Decision	5	3:00
2018-01-26	Loss	(Thailand) Sibsaen Tor.Eawcharoentongphuket	Upcountry	Thailand	Decision	5	3:00
2017-12-19	Win	(Thailand) Theppabut SitUbon	Lumpinee Stadium	Bangkok, Thailand	Decision	5	3:00
2017-08-26	Win	(Thailand) Yutthakan Phet.Por.Tor.Or	Lumpinee Stadium	Bangkok, Thailand	Decision	5	3:00
2016-08-05	Loss	(Thailand) Nuenglanlek Jitmuangnon	Upcountry	Thailand	Decision	5	3:00
2016-06-26	Win	(Thailand) Phetmorakot Teeded99	Jitmuangnon Stadium	Nonthaburi, Thailand	Decision	5	3:00
2016-05-08	Loss	(Thailand) Mongkoldetlek Kesagym	Channel 7 Stadium	Bangkok, Thailand	Decision	5	3:00
2016-03-29	Loss	(Thailand) Deksakda Sitsongpeenong	Lumpinee Stadium	Bangkok, Thailand	Decision	5	3:00
2014-12-09	Win	(Thailand) Pokaew Fonjangchonburi	Lumpinee Stadium	Bangkok, Thailand	KO (elbow)	2	
2014-09-30	Win	(Thailand) Saen Parunchai	Lumpinee Stadium	Bangkok, Thailand	Decision	5	3:00
For a 2 million baht side-bet
2014-08-31	Win	(Thailand) Yutthakan Phet.Por.Tor.Or	Channel 7 Stadium	Bangkok, Thailand	KO (punch)	2	
2013-07-09	Loss	(Thailand) Thanonchai Thanakorngym	Lumpinee Stadium	Bangkok, Thailand	Decision	5	3:00
2012-11-30	Loss	(Thailand) Pettawee Sor Kittichai	Lumpinee Stadium	Bangkok, Thailand	Decision	5	3:00
2012-11-09	Loss	(Thailand) Pettawee Sor Kittichai	Lumpinee Stadium	Bangkok, Thailand	Decision	5	3:00
2012-10-11	Draw	(Thailand) PhetUtong Or.Kwanmuang	Rajadamnern Stadium	Bangkok, Thailand	Decision	5	3:00
2012-06-28	Draw	(Thailand) Superbank Sakchaichote	Rajadamnern Stadium	Bangkok, Thailand	Decision	5	3:00
2012-05-29	Win	(Thailand) Yokwitthaya Phetsimuen	Lumpinee Stadium	Bangkok, Thailand	Decision	5	3:00
2012-04-30	Loss	(Thailand) Nongbeer Chokngamwong	Rajadamnern Stadium	Bangkok, Thailand	Decision	5	3:00
2012-01-27	Loss	(Thailand) Nongbeer Chokngamwong	Lumpinee Stadium	Bangkok, Thailand	Decision	5	3:00
2011-12-06	Loss	(Thailand) Yodwicha Por.Boonsit	Lumpinee Stadium	Bangkok, Thailand	KO (Elbow)	4	
2011-10-20	Win	(Thailand) Phutpadnoi Muangsima	Onesongchai, Rajadamnern Stadium	Bangkok, Thailand	Decision	5	3:00
2011-08-18	Loss	(Thailand) Superbank Sakchaichote	Rajadamnern Stadium	Bangkok, Thailand	Decision	5	3:00
Loses Rajadamnern Stadium 115 lbs title
2010-12-15	Loss	(Thailand) Prajanchai Por.Phetnamtong	Rajadamnern Stadium	Bangkok, Thailand	Decision	5	3:00
2010-09-23	Win	(Thailand) Yodmongkol Muangsima	Rajadamnern Stadium	Bangkok, Thailand	KO	3	
Wins the Rajadamnern Stadium 115 lbs title
2010-08-27	Win	(Thailand) Superbank Sakchaichot	Lumpinee Stadium	Bangkok, Thailand	Decision	5	3:00
2010-	Win	(Thailand) Hanchai Kiatyongyut		Bangkok, Thailand	Decision	5	3:00
2010-04-25	Loss	(Thailand) Norasing Lukbanyai	2010 2nd Muaylok ー Yodmuay Champions Cup, Semi Final	Tokyo, Japan	KO (Left Hook)	3	2:43
2010-02-11	Loss	(Thailand) Prajanchai Por.Phetnamtong	Rajadamnern Stadium	Bangkok, Thailand	Decision	5	3:00
2009-12-10	Win	(Thailand) Prajanchai Por.Phetnamtong	Rajadamnern Stadium	Bangkok, Thailand	Decision	5	3:00
2009-10-08	Loss	(Thailand) Palangpon Piriyanoppachai	Palangnum, Rajadamnern Stadium	Bangkok, Thailand	Decision	5	3:00
2009-09-17	Win	(Thailand) Palangpon Piriyanoppachai	Rajadamnern Stadium	Bangkok, Thailand	Decision	5	3:00
Wins the Rajadamnern Stadium 108 lbs title.
2009-08-15	Win	(Thailand) Ruengsak Sitniwat		Bangkok, Thailand	KO	4	
2009-05-07	Loss	(Thailand) Worachit Wor.Wilaisini	Onesongchai, Rajadamnern Stadium	Bangkok, Thailand	Decision	5	3:00
2008-11-06	Win	(Thailand) Chatsamut Sitbenjama	Onesongchai, Rajadamnern Stadium	Bangkok, Thailand	Decision	5	3:00
2008-05-01	Loss	(Thailand) Fahsawang Tor.Sangtiennoi	Rajadamnern Stadium	Bangkok, Thailand	Decision	5	3:00
2008-04-10	Win	(Thailand) Kaensak Tor.Muangong	Onesongchai, Rajadamnern Stadium	Bangkok, Thailand	Decision	5	3:00
2008-03-20	Win	(Thailand) Saengchainoi Por.Saengprapai	Rajadamnern Stadium	Bangkok, Thailand	Decision	5	3:00

Legend: Win Loss Draw/No contest
