= Mongkolpetch Petchyindee Academy =

Muay Thai fighter

- Born: Somsuk Pansarapoom; July 28, 1995 (age 31); Roi Et province, Thailand
- Other names: Attachai KelaSport; Mongkoldetlek Kesagym (มงคลเดชเล็ก เคซ่ายิม); Mongkoldetlek Wor.Panyawai (มงคลเดชเล็ก ว.ปัญญาไว); Mongkoldetlek Por.Pimorn (มงคลเดชเล็ก พ.พิมพ์อร)
- Height: 167 cm (5 ft 5 1/2 in)
- Weight: 61 kg (134 lb; 10 st)
- Division: Super Bantamweight; Featherweight; Super Featherweight; Lightweight
- Reach: 70 in (178 cm)
- Fighting out of: Bangkok, Thailand

Kickboxing record
- Total: 178
- Wins: 126
- Losses: 51
- Draws: 1

Mongkolpetch Petchyindee Academy (Thai: มงคลเพชร เพชรยินดีอะคาเดมี่) is a Thai Muay Thai fighter. He is a former Lumpinee Stadium Super Featherweight champion.

== Biography and career ==
Mongkolpetch grew up in a family of farmers in Roi Et province. His older brother loved boxing since childhood and he often secretly followed him to practice. At 10 years old he had his first fight and received a purse he gave to his parents to support the family. He started his fighting career under the ring name Mongkoldetlek and represented the Panyawai camp until he was bought by the Kesa Gym camp for 200,000 baht in 2014. Mongkoldetlek had good results which led him to be fighting under the prestigious Kiatpetch promotion at Lumpinee Stadium.

The Kesa Gym camp had to close for financial reasons and Mongkoldetlek was signed by the Petchyindee Academy in 2018, he then changed his ring name to Mongkolpetch Petchyindee Academy.

On March 6, 2018, Mongkolpetch faced Muangthai PKSaenchaimuaythaigym at Lumpinee Stadium. He was defeated by decision.

Mongkolpetch faced Elias Mahmoudi in the main event of ONE Championship: Full Blast 2 on June 11, 2021. He won the fight by majority decision.

Mongkolpetch faced Jonathan Haggerty at ONE: Bad Blood on 11 February 2022. He lost the bout via unanimous decision.

Due to a disagreement between his gym, Petchyindee Academy, and ONE Championship, all Petchyindee fighters were released from the promotion at the request of the gym.

== Titles and accomplishments ==
- Lumpinee Stadium
  - 2017 Lumpinee Stadium 130 lbs Champion
- Channel 7 Boxing Stadium
  - 2017 Channel 7 Stadium Fight of the Year (vs Nawaphol Lookpachrist)
- Hilux Revo Muay Thai Marathon
  - 2018 Toyota Marathon Tournament 140 lbs Champion

== Fight record ==
128 Wins, 51 Losses, 1 Draw
Date	Result	Opponent	Event	Location	Method	Round	Time
2026-10-09	Loss	(Thailand) Dedduanglek Tded99	ONE Friday Fights 174, Lumpinee Stadium	Bangkok, Thailand	KO (punches)	2	1:26
2026-09-04	Win	(Morocco) Yassir Rassafi	ONE The Inner Circle 29, Lumpinee Stadium	Bangkok, Thailand	Decision (Majority)	3	3:00
2026-07-24	Win	(Kyrgyzstan) Utkirzhon Khamidov	ONE Friday Fights 163, Lumpinee Stadium	Bangkok, Thailand	TKO (Knees)	2	2:00
2026-05-29	Win	(Russia) Ruslan Tuktarov	ONE Friday Fights 156, Lumpinee Stadium	Bangkok, Thailand	Decision (Unanimous)	3	3:00
2026-03-15	Win	(Thailand) Petchsamui Lukjaoporongtom	Channel 7 Stadium	Bangkok, Thailand	Decision	5	3:00
2026-01-25	Loss	(Thailand) Rungsangtawan Sor.Pararat	Ton Nam Thai TKO Kiatphet, Rajadamnern Stadium	Bangkok, Thailand	Decision	5	3:00
2025-12-10	Win	(Thailand) Rungsaengtawan Sor.Parat	Or.LingMuangPhuAom Kiatpetch	Kalasin province, Thailand	Decision	5	3:00
2025-11-09	Loss	(Thailand) Rungsangtawan Sor.Pararat	Ton Nam Thai TKO Kiatphet, Rajadamnern Stadium	Bangkok, Thailand	Decision	5	3:00
2025-09-20	Draw	(Thailand) Jack Rachanon	Muay Thai Kiatpetch	Bangkok, Thailand	Decision	5	3:00
2025-08-13	Win	(Thailand) Rungsaengtawan Sor.Parat	Matuphum: Mother Land of Muay Thai	Kamphaeng Phet province, Thailand	Decision	5	3:00
2025-06-21	Loss	(Thailand) Rungsaengtawan Sor.Parat	Matuphum: Mother Land of Muay Thai	Thailand	Decision	5	3:00
2025-03-23	Loss	(Thailand) Phetsukumvit Boybangna	Channel 7 Stadium	Bangkok, Thailand	KO (Elbow)	3	
2025-02-02	Win	(Thailand) Sibsaen Por.Homklin	Channel 7 Stadium	Bangkok, Thailand	Decision	5	3:00
2024-08-25	Loss	(Cambodia) Sok Thy	Ganzberg Super Strike	Phnom Penh, Cambodia	TKO	2	
2024-06-16	Loss	(Cambodia) Thun Eanglai	Kun Khmer Grand Champion	Cambodia	TKO	3	
2024-04-14	Loss	(Cambodia) Khim Bora	Krud Kun Khmer	Cambodia	Decision	5	3:00
2023-06-24	Loss	(China) Zhao Chongyang	Wu Lin Feng 539	Tangshan, China	Decision (Majority)	3	3:00
2023-04-01	Win	(Iran) Mohammed Cyrus Gym	RWS + Sasipapha, Rajadamnern Stadium	Bangkok, Thailand	Decision	3	3:00
2022-12-02	Loss	(Thailand) Paidaeng Pakyok77	Rajadamnern World Series + Petchyindee, Rajadamnern Stadium	Bangkok, Thailand	Decision (Unanimous)	3	3:00
2022-10-30	Loss	(Thailand) Paidaeng Pakyok77	Muaydee Vitheethai + Jitmuangnon, Or.Tor.Gor.3 Stadium	Nonthaburi, Thailand	Decision	5	3:00
2022-09-18	Win	(Thailand) Duangsompong Jitmuangnon	Suek Muay Thai Witee Tin Thai Muang Nam Dam	Kalasin province, Thailand	Decision (Split)	5	3:00
2022-08-18	Win	(Thailand) Petchsinin Chor.Thaiset	Petchyindee, Rajadamnern Stadium	Bangkok, Thailand	Decision	5	3:00
2022-06-12	Loss	(Thailand) Paidaeng Paesaisee	Muaydee VitheeThai + Jitmuangnon, Or.Tor.Gor3 Stadium	Nonthaburi province, Thailand	Decision	5	3:00
2022-05-21	Win	(Thailand) Pato Wor.Wangprom	Banchamek Gym Buakaw Village	Chiang Mai province, Thailand	Decision	5	3:00
2022-02-11	Loss	(United Kingdom) Jonathan Haggerty	ONE: Bad Blood	Singapore	Decision (Unanimous)	3	3:00
2021-11-04	Loss	(Thailand) Flukenoi Kiatfahlikit	Petchyindee + Muay Thai Moradok Kon Thai	Buriram Province, Thailand	Decision	5	3:00
2021-06-11	Win	(Algeria) Elias Mahmoudi	ONE Championship: Full Blast 2	Singapore	Decision (Majority)	3	3:00
2021-04-09	Loss	(Thailand) Chorfah Tor.Sangtiennoi	Petchyindee Road Show	Songkhla, Thailand	Decision	5	3:00
2021-03-13	Win	(Thailand) Kaewkangwan Priwayo	Majujaya Muay Thai, Temporary Outdoors Stadium	Pattani, Thailand	Decision	5	3:00
2020-07-31	Win	(Cambodia) Sok Thy	ONE Championship: No Surrender 3	Bangkok, Thailand	Decision (Unanimous)	3	3:00
2020-02-28	Win	(Thailand) Kaewkangwan Priwayo	Ruamponkonchon Pratan Super Fight	Pathum Thani, Thailand	Decision	5	3:00
2020-01-31	Draw	(Thailand) Superball Tded99	Phuket Super Fight Real Muay Thai	Mueang Phuket District, Thailand	Decision	5	3:00
2019-11-21	Loss	(Thailand) Rungkit Wor.Sanprapai	Rajadamnern Stadium	Bangkok, Thailand	Decision	5	3:00
2019-10-18	Win	(Thailand) Teeradet Chor.Hapayak	Lumpinee Stadium	Bangkok, Thailand	Decision	5	3:00
2019-09-06	Win	(Italy) Joseph Lasiri	ONE Championship: Immortal Triumph	Ho Chi Minh City, Vietnam	Decision (Majority)	3	3:00
2019-07-18	Win	(Thailand) Phet Utong Or. Kwanmuang	Rajadamnern Stadium	Bangkok, Thailand	Decision	5	3:00
2019-04-24	Win	(Thailand) Petchngam Kiatkampon	Rajadamnern Stadium	Bangkok, Thailand	Decision	5	3:00
2019-03-20	Win	(Thailand) Chanasuek Gor.Kampanat	Rajadamnern Stadium	Bangkok, Thailand	KO	3	
2019-01-19	Win	(New Zealand) Alexi Serepisos	ONE Championship: Eternal Glory	Jakarta, Indonesia	Decision (Unanimous)	3	3:00
2018-12-21	Win	(Thailand) Petchsongpak Sitcharoensap	True4U Muaymanwansuk Hilux Revo Marathon	Songkhla, Thailand	Decision	5	3:00
2018-11-22	Loss	(Thailand) Dechsakda Phukongyadsuebudomsuk	Rajadamnern Stadium	Bangkok, Thailand	Decision	5	3:00
2018-10-19	Win	(Thailand) Tawanauek Sit-Or.Boonchob	Toyota Marathon, Final	Hat Yai, Thailand	Decision	3	3:00
Wins the Toyota Marathon Tournament 140 lbs title
2018-10-19	Win	(Iran) Jamel Madani	Toyota Marathon, Semi Finals	Hat Yai, Thailand	Decision	3	3:00
2018-10-19	Win	(Morocco) Badr Elhamss	Toyota Marathon, Quarter Finals	Hat Yai, Thailand	KO	2	
2018-09-13	Loss	(Thailand) Yamin PK.Saenchaimuaythaigym	Rajadamnern Stadium	Bangkok, Thailand	Decision	5	3:00
2018-07-06	Win	(Thailand) Yok Parunchai	RuamponkonSamui	Ko Samui, Thailand	Decision	5	3:00
2018-06-05	Loss	(Thailand) Suakim PK Saenchaimuaythaigym	Lumpinee Stadium	Bangkok, Thailand	Decision	5	
2018-03-06	Loss	(Thailand) Muangthai PKSaenchaimuaythaigym	Lumpineekiatphet, Lumpinee Stadium	Bangkok, Thailand	Decision	5	3:00
2018-01-19	Win	(Thailand) Phetpabut Situbon		Thailand	Decision	5	3:00
2017-12-08	Win	(Thailand) Nawaphol Lookprachrist	Lumpinee Stadium	Bangkok, Thailand	Decision	5	3:00
2017-11-14	Loss	(Thailand) Nawaphol Lookprachrist	Lumpinee Stadium	Bangkok, Thailand	Decision	5	3:00
Lost the Lumpinee Stadium 130 lbs title
2017-09-24	Loss	(Thailand) Nawaphol Lookprachrist		Bangkok, Thailand	Decision	5	3:00
2017-08-20	Win	(Thailand) Yok Parunchai	Channel 7 Boxing Stadium	Bangkok, Thailand	Decision	5	3:00
2017-07-14	Loss	(Thailand) Suakim PK Saenchaimuaythaigym		Koh Samui, Thailand	KO	4	
2017-06-09	Win	(Thailand) Suakim PK Saenchaimuaythaigym	Lumpinee Stadium	Bangkok, Thailand	Decision	5	3:00
Wins the vacant Lumpinee Stadium 130 lbs title
2017-03-05	Win	(Thailand) Nawaphol Lookprachrist	Channel 7 Boxing Stadium	Thailand	Decision	5	3:00
2017-02-07	Win	(Thailand) Sakchainoy MU-Den	Lumpinee Stadium	Bangkok, Thailand	Decision	5	3:00
2017-01-10	Win	(Thailand) Palaphol Sor.Tor Yiaobangsaen	Lumpinee Stadium	Bangkok, Thailand	Decision	5	3:00
2016-12-09	Win	(Thailand) Saen Parunchai	Lumpinee Stadium	Bangkok, Thailand	Decision	5	3:00
2016-10-04	Loss	(Thailand) Phetmorakot Teeded99	Lumpinee Stadium	Bangkok, Thailand	Decision	5	3:00
2016-09-02	Loss	(Thailand) Phetmorakot Teeded99	Lumpinee Stadium	Bangkok, Thailand	Decision	5	3:00
2016-07-12	Win	(Thailand) Sirimongkol PK.SaenchaiMuayThaiGym	Lumpinee Stadium	Bangkok, Thailand	Decision	5	3:00
2016-06-28	Loss	(Thailand) Nawaphol Lookprachrist	Channel 7 Boxing Stadium	Thailand	Decision	5	3:00
2016-06-19	Draw	(Thailand) Nawaphol Lookprachrist	Channel 7 Boxing Stadium	Thailand	Decision	5	3:00
2016-05-08	Win	(Thailand) Yodtongthai Sor.Sommai	Channel 7 Boxing Stadium	Thailand	Decision	5	3:00
2016-03-15	Win	(Thailand) Yuthakan Phet-Por.Tor.Or.	Lumpinee Stadium	Bangkok, Thailand	Decision	5	3:00
2016-02-21	Loss	(Thailand) Yuthakan Phet-Por.Tor.Or.	Rangsit Stadium	Thailand	Decision	5	3:00
2016-01-31	Win	(Thailand) Rungpet Kiatjaroenchai	Rangsit Boxing Stadium	Thailand	KO	1	
2016-01-03	Win	(Thailand) Petchtaksin Sor.Sommai	Channel 7 Boxing Stadium	Thailand	Decision	5	3:00
2015-12-06	Win	(Thailand) Payakdam Extracolefilm	Rajadamnern Stadium	Bangkok, Thailand	Decision	5	3:00
2015-11-25	Win	(Thailand) Phetsusan MU-Den	Rajadamnern Stadium	Bangkok, Thailand	KO	1	
2015-10-25	Win	(Thailand) Densiam Sakvichian	Jitmuangnon Boxing Stadium	Thailand	Decision	5	3:00
2015-09-06	Win	(Thailand) Nongbee Sitsarawatjiraphong	Rajadamnern Stadium	Bangkok, Thailand	Decision	5	3:00
2015-01-31	Loss	(Thailand) Palaphol Sor.Tor Yiaobangsaen	Lumpinee Stadium	Bangkok, Thailand	Decision	5	3:00
2014-11-23	Win	(Thailand) Nongbee Sitsarawatjiraphong	Jitmuangnon Boxing Stadium	Thailand	Decision	5	3:00
2014-09-24	Loss	(Thailand) Phetmuangchon Sudsakorn MuayThaiGym	Lumpinee Stadium	Bangkok, Thailand	TKO	3	
2014-09-19	Win	(Thailand) Kunkrai Parunchai	Lumpinee Stadium	Bangkok, Thailand	TKO	3	
Legend: Win Loss Draw/No contest Notes
