= ONE Friday Fights 3 =

Combat sport events in 2023

ONE Friday Fights 3: Chorfah vs. Phetsukumvit
- Promotion: ONE Championship
- Date: February 3, 2023
- Venue: Lumpinee Boxing Stadium
- City: Bangkok, Thailand

Event chronology
ONE Friday Fights: Sangmanee vs. Kulabdam 2	ONE Friday Fights 3: Chorfah vs. Phetsukumvit	ONE Friday Fights 4: Duangsompong vs. Batman

ONE Friday Fights 3: Chorfah vs. Petsukumvit (also known as ONE Lumpinee 3) was a combat sport event produced by ONE Championship that took place on February 3, 2023, at Lumpinee Boxing Stadium in Bangkok, Thailand.

== Background ==
A flyweight muay thai bout between Chorfah Tor.Sangtiennoi and Phetsukumvit Boybangna served as the event headliner.

== Results ==
Main Card (YouTube / Facebook)
Weight class				Method	Round	Time	Notes
Flyweight Muay Thai	Phetsukumvit Boybangna	def.	Chorfah Tor.Sangtiennoi	Decision (unanimous)	3	3:00
Bantamweight Kickboxing	Elbrus Osmanov	def.	Paedsaenlek P.K.Saenchai	KO (spinning back kick)	1	1:41
Strawweight Muay Thai	Kongchai Chanaidonmuang	def.	Kritpetch P.K.Saenchai	KO (body kick and punches)	1	2:15
Bantamweight Muay Thai	Ilyas Musaev	def.	Phanrith Lookjaomaesaiwaree	KO (punch)	2	1:03
Women's Atomweight Muay Thai	Yu Yau Pui	def.	TheStar SitChor.	KO (punches)	2	1:12
Preliminary card (FanDuel TV)
Lightweight Muay Thai	Rungrawee Sitsongpeenong	def.	Mustafa Al Takreeti	Decision (unanimous)	3	3:00
Featherweight	Shannon Wiratchai	def.	Puriya Golpour	TKO (punches and elbow)	1	4:33
Featherweight Muay Thai	Alexandru Bublea	def.	Alan Yauny	Decision (unanimous)	3	3:00
Lightweight	Alisson Barbosa	def.	Elliot Compton	Submission (arm-triangle choke)	1	2:29
Women's Strawweight Muay Thai	Dokmaipa Fairtex	def.	Barbara Aguiar	Decision (unanimous)	3	3:00
Bantamweight	Ivan Parshikov	def.	Dimitry Babkin	Decision (unanimous)	3	5:00

== Bonus awards ==
The following fighters received $10,000 bonuses.

- Performance of the Night: Elbrus Amirkhanovich, Kongchai Chanaidonmuang, Ilyas Musaev, Yu Yau Pui, Shannon Wiratchai and Alisson Barbosa

== See also ==
- 2023 in ONE Championship
- List of ONE Championship events
- List of current ONE fighters
