= Bogdan Shumarov =

Bulgarian kickboxer

Bogdan Shumarov Богдан Шумаров
- Born: Bogdan Dimitrov Shumarov; October 5, 1996 (age 30); Petrich, Bulgaria
- Height: 179 cm (5 ft 10 in)
- Weight: 77 kg (170 lb; 12.1 st)
- Style: Kickboxing
- Stance: Orthodox
- Fighting out of: Utrecht, Netherlands
- Team: SB Gym
- Trainer: Said el Badaoui; Delyan Slavov (former)
- Years active: 2010–present

Kickboxing record
- Total: 23
- Wins: 19
- By knockout: 7
- Losses: 4
- By knockout: 0

Bogdan Dimitrov Shumarov (born October 5, 1996) is a Bulgarian professional kickboxer, fighting out of Utrecht, Netherlands and currently competing in the Lightweight division of ONE Championship. He also formerly competed in the SUPERKOMBAT and Colosseum Tournament.

As of August 2023, Shumarov is ranked as the first-best welterweight kickboxer in the world by Beyond Kickboxing.

== Kickboxing career ==
=== Early career ===
Shumarov faced Joao Silva for the WAKO-Pro European K-1 Rules Light Middleweight (-71.8 kg) title at Ultimate Pro Fight VII on March 10, 2017. He captured the championship by a fourth-round technical knockout.

Shumarov faced Mădălin Crăciunică at SUPERKOMBAT Expo on July 17, 2017. He won the fight by a third-round technical knockout. The contest was stopped on the advice of the ringside physician, who deemed Crăciunică's nose injury too severe.

Shumarov faced Ivan Timkov at Senshi 1 on February 23, 2019. He won the fight by a third-round knockout. Shumarov made his next SENSHI appearance against Ilyas Boukouya at Senshi 2 on May 22, 2019. He won the fight by unanimous decision.

Shumarov was expected to face Damian Ory in the semifinals of the No Strike No Life lightweight (-71 kg) tournament, held on March 7, 2019. As Ory was unable to fight, Shumarov automatically advanced to the tournament finals, where he faced Furkan Karabag. He won the fight by unanimous decision.

Shumarov faced Daniel Pattvean at Colosseum Tournament 10 on December 14, 2018. He lost the fight by split decision, after an extra fourth round was contested. Shumarov next appeared on the Romanian circuit opposite Andrei Ostrovanu at Colosseum Tournament 11 on March 29, 2019. He lost the fight by split decision.

Shumarov was expected to face Suliman Kosumov at SENSHI 4 on October 26, 2019. He withdrew from the fight on October 21, after sustaining an undisclosed injury in training.

Shumarov faced Maikel Astur for the vacant WAKO-Pro European K-1 Rules Middleweight (-75 kg) title at Senshi 5 on May 22, 2020. He won the fight by unanimous decision.

Shumarov faced Miloš Bajović at Senshi 6 on August 12, 2020. He won the fight by unanimous decision. Shumarov next faced Mitch Kupers at World Fight League on May 16, 2021. He won the fight by unanimous decision.

=== ONE Championship ===
On February 22, 2023, it was revealed that Shumarov had signed a six-fight deal with ONE Championship and would make his promotional debut against Marwen Houli at ONE Friday Fights 6 on February 24, 2023. He won the fight by a first-round knockout.

Shumarov faced Constantin Rusu at ONE Fight Night 12 on July 14, 2023. He won the fight by a third-round technical knockout, flooring Rusu with a head kick midway through the round.

Shumarov faced Rungrawee Sitsongpeenong on May 4, 2024, at ONE Fight Night 22. He lost the fight by split decision.

== Championships and accomplishments ==
=== Professional ===
- World Association of Kickboxing Organizations
  - 2017 WAKO-Pro European K-1 Rules Light Middleweight (-71.8 kg) Championship
  - 2020 WAKO-Pro European K-1 Rules Middleweight (-75 kg) Championship

=== Amateur ===
- World Muaythai Federation
  - 2015 WMF World Championship -71 kg (silver)
- World Association of Kickboxing Organizations
  - 2016 WAKO European Championship K-1 -71 kg (gold)
  - 2017 WAKO World Championship K-1 -71 kg (silver)
- World Games
  - 2017 World Games Kickboxing Light Middleweight (-71 kg) (silver)

== Fight record ==
Kickboxing record
19 Wins (7 (T)KO's), 4 Losses, 0 Draws, 0 No Contests
Date	Result	Opponent	Event	Location	Method	Round	Time
2026-11-07	Win	(Azerbaijan) Gasham Mammadov	ONE Fight Night 49	Bangkok, Thailand	Decision (Unanimous)	3	3:00
2025-10-03	Win	(Poland) Maciej Karpiński	ONE Friday Fights 127, Lumpinee Stadium	Bangkok, Thailand	KO (Left hooks to the body)	1	2:41
2024-12-14	Win	(Guinea-Bissau) Bassó Pires	UAM K-1 Pro Night	Abu Dhabi, United Arab Emirates	Decision (Unanimous)	3	3:00
2024-05-04	Loss	(Thailand) Rungrawee Sitsongpeenong	ONE Fight Night 22	Bangkok, Thailand	Decision (Split)	3	3:00
2023-07-14	Win	(Moldova) Constantin Rusu	ONE Fight Night 12	Bangkok, Thailand	TKO (Head kick)	3	1:33
2023-02-24	Win	(Tunisia) Marwen Houli	ONE Friday Fights 6, Lumpinee Stadium	Bangkok, Thailand	KO (punch)	1	1:15
2021-05-16	Win	(Netherlands) Mitch Kuijpers	World Fight League	Netherlands	Decision (Unanimous)	3	3:00
2020-08-12	Win	(Serbia) Miloš Bajović	Senshi 6	Varna, Bulgaria	Decision (Unanimous)	3	3:00
2020-05-22	Win	(Estonia) Maikel Astur	Senshi 5	Varna, Bulgaria	Decision (Unanimous)	5	3:00
Wins the vacant WAKO-Pro European K-1 Rules Middleweight (-75 kg) title.
2019-08-24	Win	(Georgia (country)) Levan Guruli	Muaythai Grand Prix Bulgaria	Varna, Bulgaria	Decision (Unanimous)	3	3:00
2019-05-22	Win	(Netherlands) Ilyas Boukouya	Senshi 2	Varna, Bulgaria	Decision (Unanimous)	3	3:00
2019-03-29	Loss	(Romania) Andrei Ostrovanu	Colosseum Tournament 11	Bucharest, Romania	Decision (Split)	3	3:00
2019-03-07	Win	(Turkey) Furkan Karabag	No Strike No Life, Tournament Final	Dijon, France	Decision (Unanimous)	3	3:00
2019-02-23	Win	(Ukraine) Ivan Timkov	Senshi 1	Varna, Bulgaria	KO (Right straight)	3	
2018-12-14	Loss	(Romania) Daniel Pattvean	Colosseum Tournament 10	Bucharest, Romania	Ext. R. Decision (Split)	4	3:00
2018-08-02	Win	(Moldova) Alexandru Bejenaru	Max Fight Championship 41	Sveti Vlas, Bulgaria	TKO (Spinning back fist)	2	1:34
2017-07-17	Win	(Romania) Mădălin Crăciunică	SUPERKOMBAT Expo	Varna, Bulgaria	TKO (doctor stoppage/cut)	3	1:56
2017-03-10	Win	(Portugal) Gil Silva	Ultimate Pro Fight VII	Varna, Bulgaria	TKO (Injury/Broken nose)	4	
Wins the WAKO-Pro European K-1 Rules Light Middleweight (-71.8 kg) title.
2016-08-02	Win	(Bulgaria) Svetozar Kyuchukov	Max Fight 39	Sveti Vlas, Bulgaria	Decision (Unanimous)	3	3:00
2015-12-18	Win	(Bulgaria) Kiril Ivanov	Ultimate Pro Fight IV	Varna, Bulgaria	Decision	3	3:00
2016-07-28	Win	(Bulgaria) Mako Kezhedjian	Max Fight 34	Sveti Vlas, Bulgaria	Decision (Unanimous)	3	3:00
2015-02-26	Loss	(Bulgaria) Atanas Bozhilov	Ultimate Pro Fight II	Varna, Bulgaria	Decision (Unanimous)	3	3:00
Legend: Win Loss Draw/No contest Notes

Amateur Kickboxing Record
Date	Result	Opponent	Event	Location	Method	Round	Time
2017-11-	Loss	(Poland) Adam Gielata	2017 WAKO World Championship, Final	Budapest, Hungary	Decision (3:0)	3	2:00
Wins 2017 WAKO World Championship K-1 -71kg Silver Medal.
2017-11-	Win	(Turkey) Yildirim Oguz	2017 WAKO World Championship, Semifinals	Budapest, Hungary	Decision (2:1)	3	2:00
2017-11-	Win	(Kazakhstan) Beryk Kalykov	2017 WAKO World Championship, Quarterfinals	Budapest, Hungary	Decision (2:1)	3	2:00
2017-11-	Win	(Moldova) Denis Telesman	2017 WAKO World Championship, Second Round	Budapest, Hungary	Decision (3:0)	3	2:00
2017-11-	Win	(Ukraine) Vitalii Dubina	2017 WAKO World Championship, First Round	Budapest, Hungary	Decision (2:1)	3	2:00
2017-10-27	Loss	(Ukraine) Vitalii Dubina	2017 World Games, Final	Wrocław, Poland	Decision (Unanimous)	3	2:00
Wins 2017 World Games Kickboxing -71kg Silver Medal.
2017-10-26	Win	(Brazil) Bruno Gazani	2017 World Games, Semifinals	Wrocław, Poland	Decision (Unanimous)	3	2:00
2017-10-25	Win	(Slovakia) Miroslav Smolar	2017 World Games, Quarterfinals	Wrocław, Poland	Decision (Unanimous)	3	2:00
2016-10-	Win	(Ukraine) Vitalii Dubina	2016 WAKO European Championship, Final	Maribor, Slovenia	Decision (2:0)	3	2:00
Wins 2016 WAKO European Championship K-1 -71kg Gold Medal.
2016-10-	Win	(Russia) Ilya Usachev	2016 WAKO European Championship, Semifinals	Maribor, Slovenia	Decision (2:1)	3	2:00
2016-10-	Win	(Poland) Marcin Kret	2016 WAKO European Championship, Quarterfinals	Maribor, Slovenia	Decision (3:0)	3	2:00
2016-10-	Win	(Belarus) Aliaksei Shaucneka	2016 WAKO European Championship, Second Round	Maribor, Slovenia	Decision (3:0)	3	2:00
2015-08-	Loss	(Belarus) Nikitsin Uladzislau	2015 WAKO Junior European Championship, Semifinals	San Sebastián, Spain	Decision (3:0)	3	2:00
Wins 2015 WAKO Junior European Championship K-1 -75kg Bronze Medal.
2015-03-	Loss	(France) Ahmed Haroun	2015 WMF World Championship, Final	Bangkok, Thailand	Decision		
Wins 2015 WMF World Championship -71kg Silver Medal.
Legend: Win Loss Draw/No contest Notes

== See also ==
- List of male kickboxers
