= ONE Friday Fights 6 =

Combat sport events in 2023

ONE Friday Fights 6: Gingsanglek vs. Kongthoranee
- Promotion: ONE Championship
- Date: February 24, 2023
- Venue: Lumpinee Boxing Stadium
- City: Bangkok, Thailand

Event chronology
ONE Friday Fights 5: Kongklai vs. Superball	ONE Friday Fights 6: Gingsanglek vs. Kongthoranee	ONE Fight Night 7: Lineker vs. Andrade

ONE Friday Fights 6: Gingsanglek vs. Kongthoranee (also known as ONE Lumpinee 6) was a combat sport event produced by ONE Championship that took place on February 24, 2023, at Lumpinee Boxing Stadium in Bangkok, Thailand.

== Background ==
The preliminary card event live on FanDuel TV, prelim headlined by a bantamweight kickboxing bout between former ONE Flyweight Kickboxing World Champion Ilias Ennahachi and Aliasghar Ghodratisaraskan, main card live on YouTube and Facebook: ONE Championship, headlined by a flyweight muay thai bout between Gingsanglek Tor.Laksong and former Rajadamnern Stadium Super bantamweight and Lightweight champion Kongthoranee Sor.Sommai. The pairing first met at SuekJaoMuayThai in Omnoi Stadium on April 24, 2021, which Gingsanglek won by unanimous decision. Their second meeting took place at Amarin Super Fight: Chang Muay Thai Kiatpetch in Rajadamnern Stadium on March 20, 2022, which Kongthoranee won by TKO (doctor stoppage) in the round five.

A featherweight bout between Anzor Chakaev and Leonardo Casotti was scheduled for this event. However, Casotti stepped in to face Martin Nguyen at ONE Fight Night 7 on February 25 and the bout was cancelled.

== Results ==
Main card (YouTube / Facebook)
Weight class				Method	Round	Time	Notes
Flyweight Muay Thai	Kongthoranee Sor.Sommai	def.	Gingsanglek Tor.Laksong	KO (punch)	2	1:02
Catchweight (141 lbs) Muay Thai	Khunharnlek Singha Mawynn	def.	Petchmanee Sor.Jaruwan	Decision (unanimous)	3	3:00
Atomweight Muay Thai	Khunsueklek Boomdeksian	def.	Koko Sor.Sommai	Decision (split)	3	3:00
Catchweight (143 lbs) Muay Thai	Petsaenkom Yaicheyseafood	def.	Yodprabsuk Sor.Ninthai	Decision (unanimous)	3	3:00
Flyweight Muay Thai	Johan Ghazali	def.	Padetsuek Fairtex	KO (punch)	1	0:16
Atomweight Muay Thai	Chokdee Maxjandee	def.	Yoddoi Kaewsamrit	Decision (unanimous)	3	3:00
Preliminary card (FanDuel TV)
Bantamweight Kickboxing	Ilias Ennahachi	def.	Aliasghar Ghodratisaraskan	KO (punch)	2	1:20
Lightweight Kickboxing	Bogdan Shumarov	def.	Marwen Houli	KO (punch)	1	1:15
Bantamweight	Brogan Stewart-Ng	def.	Riccardo Cantindig-Stagg	Decision (unanimous)	3	3:00
Bantamweight Muay Thai	Hercules Wor.Chakrawut	def.	Shingo Shibata	Decision (unanimous)	3	3:00
Catchweight (118 lbs) Muay Thai	Celest Hansen	def.	Kalaked Por.Muangpetch	TKO (punches)	3	2:36

== Bonus awards ==
The following fighters received $10,000 bonuses.

- Performance of the Night: Kongthoranee Sor.Sommai, Johan Ghazali, Bogdan Shumarov and Celest Hansen

== See also ==
- 2023 in ONE Championship
- List of ONE Championship events
- List of current ONE fighters
