= Phetmorakot Teeded99 =

Muay Thai fighter

- Born: 1992 (age 33–34); Maha Sarakham, Thailand
- Other names: Petchmorakot Mor.Rattanabandit; Petchmorakot Nongbangsai; Petchmorakot ChonburiArtMuaythai (เพชรมรกต ชลบุรีอาร์ตมวยไทย); Petchmorakot Superbongym
- Nationality: Thai
- Height: 169 cm (5 ft 6 1/2 in)
- Weight: 61 kg (134 lb; 9.6 st)
- Stance: Southpaw
- Fighting out of: Bangkok, Thailand

Kickboxing record
- Total: 216
- Wins: 181
- Losses: 32
- Draws: 3

Phetmorakot Teeded99 (Thai: เพชรมรกต ทีเด็ด99; born 1992) is a Muay Thai fighter.

== Titles and accomplishments ==
- Lumpinee Stadium
  - 2010 Lumpinee Stadium 105 lbs Champion
  - 2012 Lumpinee Stadium 118 lbs Champion
  - 2014 Lumpinee Stadium 126 lbs Champion
  - 2016 Lumpinee Stadium 130 lbs Champion
- Channel 7 Stadium
  - 2013 Channel 7 Boxing Stadium 118 lbs Champion
  - 2016 Channel 7 Boxing Stadium 130 lbs Champion
- Professional Boxing Association of Thailand (PAT)
  - 2011 Thailand 108 lbs Champion
  - 2016 Thailand 130 lbs Champion
- Omnoi Stadium
  - 2019 Siam Omnoi Boxing Stadium 135 lbs Champion

== Fight record ==
Muay Thai record
179 Wins, 32 Losses, 3 Draws
Date	Result	Opponent	Event	Location	Method	Round	Time
2024-08-17	Loss	(Japan) Yuki Kasahara	SHOOT BOXING 2024 act.4	Tokyo, Japan	KO (Knee to the body)	1	2:27
2024-02-07	Loss	(Thailand) Denphuthai YokkaoSaenchaiMuayThai	Muay Thai Palangmai, Rajadamnern Stadium	Bangkok, Thailand	Decision	5	3:00
2024-01-03	Win	(United States) Jalil Barnes	Muay Thai Palangmai, Rajadamnern Stadium	Bangkok, Thailand	Decision	5	3:00
2023-10-07	Loss	(Thailand) Ploywittaya Chor.Wimonsin	TOPNEWS SuekJitmuangnon, Or.Tor.Gor.3 Stadium	Nonthaburi province, Thailand	Decision	5	3:00
2023-08-23	Win	(Serbia) Ognjen Topic	Muay Thai Palangmai, Rajadamnern Stadium	Bangkok, Thailand	Decision	5	3:00
2021-03-31	Loss	(Thailand) Jompichit Chuwattana	Chef Boontham, Rangsit Stadium	Rangsit, Thailand	Decision	5	3:00
2020-09-26	Loss	(Thailand) Gingsanglek Tor.Laksong	Siam Omnoi Boxing Stadium	Thailand	TKO (Low Kicks)	2	
Lost Siam omnoi Boxing Stadium 135 lbs title.
2020-08-19	Loss	(Thailand) Ploywittaya SorTor.RotSurat	Rajadamnern Stadium	Bangkok, Thailand	Decision	5	3:00
2020-01-28	Win	(Thailand) Petchngam Kiatkampon	Rajadamnern Stadium	Bangkok, Thailand	Decision	5	3:00
2019-12-25	Loss	(Thailand) Dechsakda SorJor.TongPrachin	Rajadamnern Stadium	Bangkok, Thailand	Decision	5	3:00
2019-11-12	Win	(Thailand) Taladkaek Prasertratchapan	Lumpinee Stadium	Bangkok, Thailand	Decision	5	3:00
2019-08-16	Loss	(Thailand) Denkriangkrai Singmawin	Lumpinee Stadium	Bangkok, Thailand	KO	2	
2019-05-25	Win	(Thailand) Chalamsuk Nitisamui	Siam Omnoi Boxing Stadium	Thailand	Decision	5	3:00
Wins Siam omnoi Boxing Stadium 135 lbs title.
2019-04-02	Win	(Thailand) Muangfahlek Por.Petchsiri	Lumpinee Stadium	Bangkok, Thailand	Decision	5	3:00
2019-01-08	Loss	(Thailand) Tuanpe Sor.Sommai	RuamJaiMutitaKruAriyaChat at Wat Saeng Kaeo Phothiyan	Chiang Rai, Thailand	KO	2	
2018-11-11	Loss	(Thailand) Taksila Chor.Hapayak	Blue Arena	Samut Prakan, Thailand	Decision	5	3:00
2018-01-12	Loss	(Thailand) Aphiwat Sor.Somnuek		Thailand	KO	1	
2017-06-11	Loss	(Thailand) Thepabut Sit-Aubon	Channel 7 Boxing Stadium	Bangkok, Thailand	Decision	5	3:00
2017-04-04	Loss	(Thailand) Suakim PK Saenchaimuaythaigym	Lumpinee Stadium	Bangkok, Thailand	KO	4	
Lost Lumpinee Stadium 130lbs title
2017-03-07	Win	(Thailand) Nuenglanlek Jitmuangnon	Rajadamnern Stadium	Bangkok, Thailand	KO (High Kick)		
2017-01-22	Win	(Thailand) Thepabut Sit-Aubon	Channel 7 Boxing Stadium	Bangkok, Thailand	Decision	5	3:00
2016-12-09	Win	(Thailand) Nuenglanlek Jitmuangnon	Lumpinee Stadium	Bangkok, Thailand	Decision	5	3:00
Wins Lumpinee Stadium 130lbs title
2016-10-04	Win	(Thailand) Mongkolpetch Petchyindee	Lumpinee Stadium	Bangkok, Thailand	Decision	5	3:00
2016-09-02	Win	(Thailand) Mongkolpetch Petchyindee	Lumpinee Stadium	Bangkok, Thailand	Decision	5	3:00
2016-07-24	Win	(Thailand) Nawapol Lookpachrist	Kom Chad Luek Boxing Stadium	Thailand	Decision	5	3:00
2016-06-26	Loss	(Thailand) Yodtongthai Sor.Sommai	Kom Chad Luek Boxing Stadium	Thailand	Decision	5	3:00
2016-05-27	Win	(Thailand) Phetsaifah Sor.Jor.Vichitpadriew	Channel 7 Boxing Stadium	Bangkok, Thailand	Decision	5	3:00
2016-03-20	Loss	(Thailand) Phetsuriya M.U.Den	Rangsit Boxing Stadium	Pathum Thani, Thailand	Decision	5	3:00
2016-02-20	Win	(Thailand) Decide Rachanont	Lumpinee Stadium	Bangkok, Thailand	Decision	5	3:00
2015-12-13	Win	(Thailand) Palaphon Sor.Tor. Hieowbangsaen	Jitmuagnon Boxing Stadium	Thailand	Decision	5	3:00
2015-08-06	Loss	(Thailand) Jamsak Sakburirum	Rajadamnern Stadium	Bangkok, Thailand	KO	3	
2015-07-02	Loss	(Thailand) Kaonar P.K.SaenchaiMuaythaiGym	Rajadamnern Stadium	Bangkok, Thailand	Decision	5	3:00
2015-05-30	Win	(Thailand) Phetsamrong Sitphuyainirun	Rangsit Boxing Stadium	Pathum Thani, Thailand	Decision	5	3:00
2015-04-25	Win	(Thailand) Rungphet Kiatjaroenchai	Channel 7 Boxing Stadium	Bangkok, Thailand	Decision	5	3:00
2015-01-09	Win	(Thailand) Yuthakan Phet-Por.Tor.Or.	Lumpinee Stadium	Bangkok, Thailand	Decision	5	3:00
2014-12-15	Win	(Thailand) Phetpanlan P.K.SaenchaiMuayThaiGym	Rajadamnern Stadium	Bangkok, Thailand	Decision	5	3:00
2014-10-27	Loss	(Thailand) Kumsub Eaglemuaythai	Rajadamnern Stadium	Bangkok, Thailand	KO	3	
2014-09-11	Loss	(Thailand) Sangmanee Sor Tienpo	Rajadamnern Stadium	Bangkok, Thailand	Decision	5	3:00
2014-08-13	Win	(Thailand) Rungpetch Kaiyanghadao	Rajadamnern Stadium	Bangkok, Thailand	Decision	5	3:00
2014-07-16	Win	(Thailand) Jompichit Sitchefboontham	Rajadamnern Stadium	Bangkok, Thailand	Decision	5	3:00
2014-04-28	Win	(Thailand) Lomesan Sitsoraueng	Lumpinee Stadium	Bangkok, Thailand	Decision	5	3:00
2014-04-03	Win	(Thailand) Dawtrung Chor Na-Patalung	Rajadamnern Stadium	Bangkok, Thailand	Decision	5	3:00
2014-03-13	Win	(Thailand) Thewa Sitkunma	Rajadamnern Stadium	Bangkok, Thailand	Decision	5	3:00
2012-08-18	Loss	(Thailand) Saksuriya Gaiyanghadao	Ldaprao Stadium	Thailand	Decision	5	3:00
2012-06-08	Win	(Thailand) Nutchai Pran26	Lumpinee Stadium	Bangkok, Thailand	Decision	5	3:00
Wins the vacant Lumpinee Stadium 118 lbs title.
2012-04-20	Win	(Thailand) Satarnfah Eminentair	Lumpinee Stadium	Bangkok, Thailand	KO (Straight Left)		
2012-03-18	Loss	(Thailand) Satarnfah Eminentair	Channel 7 Boxing Stadium	Bangkok, Thailand	Decision	5	3:00
For the Channel 7 Boxing Stadium 118 lbs title.
2012-02-25	Win	(Thailand) Wisanlek Seatrandiscovery	Ladprao Stadium	Thailand	Decision	5	3:00
2012-01-08	Win	(Thailand) Chaylek Sor. Permsiri	Channel 7 Boxing Stadium	Bangkok, Thailand	Decision	5	3:00
2011-10-04	Win	(Thailand) Wisanlek Seatrandiscovery	Lumpinee Stadium	Bangkok, Thailand	Decision	5	3:00
2011-06-23	Loss	(Thailand) Kaewkla Kaewsamrit	Rajadamnern Stadium	Bangkok, Thailand	KO (Uppercut)		
2011-05-22	Win	(Thailand) Lukman Fonjangchonburi	Channel 7 Stadium	Bangkok, Thailand	Decision	5	3:00
2009-06-05	Loss	(Thailand) Norasing Lukbanyai	Lumpinee Stadium	Bangkok, Thailand	TKO	1	
For the Lumpinee Stadium Flyweight title.
2009-05-01	Win	(Thailand) Wanheng Menayothin	Lumpinee Stadium	Bangkok, Thailand	Decision	5	3:00
2009-01-06	Win	(Thailand) Thanupetch Luknongphai	Lumpinee Stadium	Bangkok, Thailand	Decision	5	3:00
2008-09-04	Win	(Thailand) Moo4 Sit Tor.	Daorungprabat, Rajadamnern Stadium	Bangkok, Thailand	Decision	5	3:00
?	Loss	(Thailand) Wangchannoi Sithubon		Bangkok, Thailand	Decision	5	3:00
?	Win	(Thailand) Lookman Phonjanfchonburi		Bangkok, Thailand	Decision	5	3:00
?	Win	(Thailand) Apidet Sor.Sommai		Bangkok, Thailand	Decision	5	3:00
?	Win	(Thailand) Kanusilek	Lumpinee Stadium	Bangkok, Thailand	Decision	5	3:00
?	Loss	(Thailand) Chatchai Sor.Talaytong	Lumpinee Stadium	Bangkok, Thailand	Decision	5	3:00
?	Loss	(Thailand) Chatchai Sor.Talaytong	Lumpinee Stadium	Bangkok, Thailand	Decision	5	3:00
Legend: Win Loss Draw/No contest Notes
