= Asadula Imangazaliev =

Russian muay thai fighter

- Born: Asadula Gadzhimuradovich Imangazaliev; July 31, 2003 (age 23); Kuanib, Shamilskiy, Dagestan, Russia
- Native name: Асадула Имангазалиев
- Nickname: The Dagestan Ninja
- Height: 1.80 m (5 ft 11 in)
- Weight: 61 kg (134 lb; 9.6 st)
- Style: Muay Thai
- Stance: Orthodox
- Fighting out of: Makhachkala, Dagestan, Russia
- Team: Team Chingiz Allazov; Team Mehdi Zatout
- Trainer: Mehdi Zatout / Chris Forster; Abdulnasyr Medzhidov

Kickboxing record
- Total: 14
- Wins: 14
- By knockout: 8
- Losses: 0

Asadula Gadzhimuradovich Imangazaliev (ru: Асадула Гаджимурадович Имангазалиев; born July 31, 2003) is a Russian Muay Thai fighter currently signed to ONE Championship.

== Career ==
Imangazaliev faced Mohamed Taoufyq at ONE Friday Fights 98 on February 28, 2025. He won the fight by unanimous decision.

On June 20, 2025, Imangazaliev faced Denphuthai MC SuperlekMuayThai at ONE Friday Fights 113. He won the fight by second-round knockout.

Imangazaliev faced three time Muay Thai Fighter of the Year Panpayak Jitmuangnon on August 29, 2025, at ONE Friday Fights 122. He won by first round high kick knockout. This victory earned him both a performance bonus and a multiple fight contract worth $100,000 with the ONE Championship promotion. As of October 2025, the WMO ranked Imangazaliev as the #1 Muay Thai fighter in the world in the 135 lbs division.

Imangazaliev made his debut on a major ONE Championship card at ONE Fight Night 39 where he faced Kongthoranee Sor.Sommai. He won the fight by second-round knockout with body punches. After the victory he called for a title fight.

Imangazaliev faced Nong-O Hama on March 20, 2026, for the vacant ONE Flyweight Muay Thai World Championship at ONE Friday Fights 147.Imangazaliev won by knockout in the second round but was ineligible for the title due to missing weight.

== Doping suspension ==
In May 2023, Imangazaliev participated to the IFMA World championships where he would end up winning the gold medal in the -60 kg division. In January 2025, IFMA announced that Imangazaliev tested positive for a banned substance, meldonium, during in-competition testing on May 12, 2023, and would subsequently be stripped of his medal as well as imposed a period of ineligibility of four years effective from 19 June 2023 to 18 June 2027.

== Championships and accomplishments ==
=== Professional ===
- ONE Championship
  - 2026 ONE Flyweight Muay Thai World Championship
    - One successful title defense

=== Amateur ===
- International Federation of Muaythai Associations
  - 2x Russian Muay Thai Championships −60 kg (gold) (2022, 2023)
  - 2023 IFMA World Championships −60 kg (gold) (revoked)

== Fight record ==
Professional Muay Thai record
14 Wins (8 (T)KO's), 0 Loss, 0 Draw
Date	Result	Opponent	Event	Location	Method	Round	Time
2027-		(United Kingdom) Ubaid Hussain	ONE Friday Fights, Lumpinee Stadium	Bangkok, Thailand			
2026 ONE Flyweight Muay Thai World Grand Prix Semifinal. Defending the ONE Flyweight Muay Thai World Championship.
2026-11-20	Win	(Uzbekistan) Aslamjon Ortikov	ONE The Inner Circle 39, Lumpinee Stadium	Bangkok, Thailand	Decision (Split)	5	3:00
2026 ONE Flyweight Muay Thai World Grand Prix Quarterfinal. Defended the ONE Flyweight Muay Thai World Championship.
2026-06-26	Win	(Uzbekistan) Aslamjon Ortikov	ONE The Inner Circle 20, Lumpinee Stadium	Bangkok, Thailand	Decision (Split)	5	3:00
Wins the vacant ONE Flyweight Muay Thai World Championship.
2026-03-20	Win	(Thailand) Nong-O Hama	ONE Friday Fights 147, Lumpinee Stadium	Bangkok, Thailand	KO (Left hook)	2	0:44
For the vacant ONE Flyweight Muay Thai World Championship. Imangazaliev missed weight, only Nong-O was eligible to win the title
2026-01-23	Win	(Thailand) Kongthoranee Sor.Sommai	ONE Fight Night 39	Bangkok, Thailand	KO (Left hook to the body)	2	1:06
2025-08-29	Win	(Thailand) Panpayak Jitmuangnon	ONE Friday Fights 122, Lumpinee Stadium	Bangkok, Thailand	KO (High kick)	1	2:07
2025-06-20	Win	(Thailand) Denphuthai MC SuperlekMuayThai	ONE Friday Fights 113, Lumpinee Stadium	Bangkok, Thailand	KO (Punches)	2	0:52
2025-02-28	Win	(Morocco) Mohamed Taoufyq	ONE Friday Fights 98, Lumpinee Stadium	Bangkok, Thailand	Decision (Unanimous)	3	3:00
2024-12-06	Win	(Thailand) Dedduanglek TDed99	ONE Friday Fights 90, Lumpinee Stadium	Bangkok, Thailand	KO (Spinning backfist)	1	0:34
2024-09-13	Win	(Uzbekistan) Bobirjon Isroilov	ONE Friday Fights 79, Lumpinee Stadium	Bangkok, Thailand	KO (Punch)	1	0:34
2024-07-19	Win	(Thailand) Petchmuangsri Wankhongohm MBK	ONE Friday Fights 71, Lumpinee Stadium	Bangkok, Thailand	KO (Spinning back elbow)	1	1:45
2024-01-27	Win	(France) Lucas Poma	Rajadamnern World Series, Rajadamnern Stadium	Bangkok, Thailand	KO (High knee)	1	1:03
2022-02-05	Win	(Russia) Vladimir Shilnov	Muay Thai Factory 4	Kemerovo, Russia	Decision (Unanimous)	5	3:00
2021-11-12	Win	(Russia) Egor Mazin	Muay Thai Factory	Kemerovo, Russia	Decision (Majority)	3	3:00
Legend: Win Loss Draw/No contest Notes

Amateur Muay Thai Record
Date	Result	Opponent	Event	Location	Method	Round	Time
2023-05-12	NC	(Thailand) Phongsathorn Rueangnoi	2023 IFMA Senior World Championships, Final	Bangkok, Thailand	Decision (29:28)	3	3:00
Originally a decision win for Imangazaliev later overturned following a positive PED test.
2023-05-10	NC	(Palestine) Abed Al Hafez Mustapha	2023 IFMA Senior World Championships, Semi Final	Bangkok, Thailand	TKO	1	
2023-05-08	NC	(Iran) Sadra Mohammadi	2023 IFMA Senior World Championships, Quarter Final	Bangkok, Thailand	TKO	2	
2023-05-06	NC	(Jordan) Saif Zakzook	2023 IFMA Senior World Championships, First Round	Bangkok, Thailand	Decision (30:27)	3	3:00
Legend: Win Loss Draw/No contest Notes

== See also ==
- List of male kickboxers
