= Phetpangan Mor.Ratanabandit =

Thai Muay Thai fighter

- Born: August 26, 1998 (age 28); Krabi, Thailand
- Other names: Phetpangan Tded99; Petchpangnan Sor.Sooksom
- Nationality: Thai
- Height: 170 cm (5 ft 7 in)
- Weight: 59 kg (130 lb; 9.3 st)
- Stance: Orthodox
- Fighting out of: Singapore; Bangkok, Thailand
- Team: Kaoklai Studio; Tded99

Kickboxing record
- Total: 160
- Wins: 126
- By knockout: 12
- Losses: 32
- Draws: 2

Phetpangan Mor.Ratanabandit (Thai: เพชรพะงัน ม.รัตนบัณฑิต) is a Thai Muay Thai fighter.

Phetphangan Mor Ratanabandit also known as Phet Phangan Tded99 was born on August 26, 1998 in Pattani Thailand. He began Muay Thai training at the age of 7 and after just two months he won his first fight. Through discipline and dedication he quickly rose through the ranks under skilled trainers.

At 16 he made his professional debut and by 18 he moved to Bangkok for university balancing his studies with his fighting career. Phet Phangan was known for his technical skill, discipline, and determination. His ability to balance both education and professional fighting demonstrated his strong work ethic.

Phet Pangan is currently an instructor of Muay Thai at Kaoklai Studio in Singapore.

== Titles and accomplishments ==
- Rajadamnern Stadium
  - 2019 Rajadamnern Stadium Featherweight (126 lbs) Champion
- World Muaythai Council
  - 2022 WMC World Super Featherweight (130 lbs) Champion

== Fight record ==
Muay Thai Record
126 Wins (12 (T)KO's), 32 Losses, 2 Draws
Date	Result	Opponent	Event	Location	Method	Round	Time
2022-08-24	Win	(Thailand) Chatmungkorn Chor.Hapayak	Muay Thai Palangmai, Rajadamnern Stadium	Bangkok, Thailand	Decision	5	3:00
2022-06-11	Win	(Italy) Alex Avogadro	Golden Fight Night	Valenza, Italy	Decision	5	3:00
Wins the vacant WMC World 130 lbs title.
2022-04-16	Loss	(Thailand) Phetsukumvit Boybangna	Sor.Sommai + Pitaktham	Phayao province, Thailand	KO (Knee to the body)	3	
2022-03-11	Win	(Thailand) Saksri Kiatmoo9	Muaymanwansuk, Rangsit Stadium	Rangsit, Thailand	KO (Low kick)	2	
2022-01-01	Win	(Thailand) Yodtongthai Sor.Sommai	Suekjao Muaythai, Omnoi Stadium	Bangkok, Thailand	Decision	5	3:00
2021-10-30	Loss	(Thailand) Buakiew Por.Paoin	Suekjao Muaythai	Bangkok, Thailand	Decision	5	3:00
2021-09-15	Loss	(Thailand) Ploywittaya NayokwitThungSong	Chefboontham, Lumpinee Studio	Bangkok, Thailand	Decision	5	3:00
2020-12-07	NC	(Thailand) Wanchana Nor.Narissorn	Road to ONE 5: WSS	Bangkok, Thailand	No contest (low blow)	3	
2020-11-12	Win	(Thailand) Wanchana Nor.Narissorn	Rajadamnern Stadium	Bangkok, Thailand	Decision	5	3:00
2020-07-23	Loss	(Thailand) Berkban JoeNuvo	Rajadamnern Stadium	Bangkok, Thailand	Decision	5	3:00
2020-03-12	Win	(Thailand) Yodkitsada Yuthachonburi	Rajadamnern Stadium	Bangkok, Thailand	Decision	5	3:00
2020-02-06	Loss	(Thailand) Prajanban SorJor.Vichitpadriew	Rajadamnern Stadium	Bangkok, Thailand	Decision	5	3:00
2019-12-26	Win	(Thailand) Kongthoranee Sor.Sommai	Rajadamnern Stadium	Bangkok, Thailand	Decision	5	3:00
2019-10-21	Win	(Thailand) Thanupetch Wor.Sangprapai	Rajadamnern Stadium	Bangkok, Thailand	Decision	5	3:00
2019-09-02	Win	(Thailand) Kongthoranee Sor.Sommai	Rajadamnern Stadium	Bangkok, Thailand	Decision	5	3:00
2019-08-01	Win	(Thailand) Yodkitsada Yuthachonburi	Rajadamnern Stadium	Bangkok, Thailand	Decision	5	3:00
Wins Rajadamnern Stadium 126 lbs title.
2019-06-30	Loss	(Japan) Masashi Kumura	K-1 World GP 2019: Super Bantamweight World Tournament, Quarter Finals	Saitama, Japan	TKO (2 Knockowns/punches)	1	2:28
2019-04-25	Loss	(Thailand) Kongthoranee Sor.Sommai	Rajadamnern Stadium	Bangkok, Thailand	Decision	5	3:00
2019-02-22	Win	(Thailand) Berkban Aunsukhumvit	Rajadamnern Stadium	Bangkok, Thailand	Decision	5	3:00
2019-01-28	Loss	(Thailand) Surachai Sor.Sommai	Rajadamnern Stadium	Bangkok, Thailand	Decision	5	3:00
2019-01-03	Draw	(Thailand) Surachai Sor.Sommai	Rajadamnern Stadium	Bangkok, Thailand	Decision	5	3:00
2018-11-28	Win	(Thailand) Petchthaksin Sor.Sommai	Rajadamnern Stadium	Bangkok, Thailand	Decision	5	3:00
2018-10-15	Win	(Thailand) Jompikat Chuwattana	Rajadamnern Stadium	Bangkok, Thailand	Decision	5	3:00
2018-08-29	Win	(Thailand) Flukenoi Muayded789	Rajadamnern Stadium	Bangkok, Thailand	Decision	5	3:00
2018-07-16	Loss	(Thailand) Yodkitsada Yuthachonburi	Rajadamnern Stadium	Bangkok, Thailand	Decision	5	3:00
2018-06-21	Win	(Thailand) Gingsanglek Tor.Laksong	Rajadamnern Stadium	Bangkok, Thailand	Decision	5	3:00
2018-05-23	Win	(Thailand) Yodbuadaeng Theglaffpattaya	Rajadamnern Stadium	Bangkok, Thailand	Decision	5	3:00
2018-04-01	Loss	(Thailand) Prakayphet Nitisamui	Blue Arena	Samut Prakan, Thailand	Decision	5	3:00
For the Blue Arena Super Bantamweight title.
2018-02-14	Win	(Thailand) Roichueng Singmawin	Rajadamnern Stadium	Bangkok, Thailand	Decision	5	3:00
2018-01-12	Win	(Thailand) Oley Tor.Laksong	Lumpinee Stadium	Bangkok, Thailand	Decision	5	3:00
2017-12-14	Win	(Thailand) Sanpetch Sitnayokgaipaedriw	Rajadamnern Stadium	Bangkok, Thailand	Decision	5	3:00
2017-09-21	Win	(Thailand) Pichitman Sitnansrinon	Rajadamnern Stadium	Bangkok, Thailand	KO	4	
2017-08-16	Loss	(Thailand) Roichueng Singmawin	Rajadamnern Stadium	Bangkok, Thailand	Decision	5	3:00
2017-06-15	Loss	(Thailand) Sanpetch Sitnayokgaipaedriw	Rajadamnern Stadium	Bangkok, Thailand	Decision	5	3:00
2017-05-01	Loss	(Thailand) Fameeta Taembangsai	Rajadamnern Stadium	Bangkok, Thailand	Decision	5	3:00
2017-01-19	Loss	(Thailand) Prajanban Sor.Jor.Wichitbaetriw	Rajadamnern Stadium	Bangkok, Thailand	Decision	5	3:00
2016-12-15	Win	(Thailand) Petchgiangkrai R-Airline	Rajadamnern Stadium	Bangkok, Thailand	Decision	5	3:00
2016-09-17	Loss	(Thailand) Phetniyom F.A.Group	Montri Studio	Bangkok, Thailand	Decision	5	3:00
2016-07-21	Loss	(Thailand) Kongkrabi STD Transport	Rajadamnern Stadium	Bangkok, Thailand	Decision	5	3:00
2016-06-22	Win	(Thailand) Phetsuphan Por.Daorungruang	Rajadamnern Stadium	Bangkok, Thailand	Decision	5	3:00
2016-05-26	Win	(Thailand) Phetsakon Tor.Laksong	Rajadamnern Stadium	Bangkok, Thailand	KO	4	
2016-05-04	Loss	(Thailand) Seryai Chor.Hapayak	Rajadamnern Stadium	Bangkok, Thailand	Decision	5	3:00
2016-04-09	Loss	(Thailand) Sayanlek Sayangym	Rajadamnern Stadium	Bangkok, Thailand	Decision	5	3:00
2016-02-13	Win	(Thailand) Fahlan Por.Phetkhaikaew	Montri Studio	Bangkok, Thailand	Decision	5	3:00
2016-01-09	Loss	(Thailand) Cherry Duangjaiphor	Montri Studio	Bangkok, Thailand	KO	3	
2015-12-01	Win	(Thailand) Yodsiam FighterMuaythai	Lumpinee Stadium	Bangkok, Thailand	Decision	5	3:00
2015-11-06	Win	(Thailand) Phayakmongkol Teeded99	Lumpinee Stadium	Bangkok, Thailand	KO	3	
2015-10-15	Loss	(Thailand) Diesellek PetchyindeeAcademy	Rajadamnern Stadium	Bangkok, Thailand	Decision	5	3:00
2015-07-10	Loss	(Thailand) Kiewpayak Jitmuangnon	Lumpinee Stadium	Bangkok, Thailand	Decision	5	3:00
2015-05-13	Win	(Thailand) Chaiyo PetchyindeeAcademy	Rajadamnern Stadium	Bangkok, Thailand	Decision	5	3:00
2015-03-29	Win	(Thailand) Sakchainoi Sit Sor Tor Lek	Rangsit Stadium	Thailand	Decision	5	3:00
2015-02-06	Win	(Thailand) Neuamek Sitjaymeaw	Lumpinee Stadium	Bangkok, Thailand	Decision	5	3:00
2015-01-11	Win	(Thailand) Numtrangnoi Singpomprab	Rangsit Stadium	Thailand	Decision	5	3:00
Legend: Win Loss Draw/No contest Notes
