= Gingsanglek Tor.Laksong =

Muay Thai fighter

- Born: 6 September 2000 (age 26); Buriram Province, Thailand
- Other names: Gingsanglek P.K.Saenchaimuaythaigym; Kingsanglek Sor Panomtong (กิ่งซางเล็ก ส.พนมทอง); Gingsanglek Sitnonglek; Gingsanglek Wor Kumchamnarn
- Height: 168 cm (5 ft 6 in)
- Weight: 61 kg (134 lb; 9.6 st)
- Stance: Southpaw
- Fighting out of: Bangkok, Thailand
- Team: P.K.Saenchai Muay Thai Gym; Phor.Pinnapat Gym (former)

Gingsanglek Tor.Laksong (Thai: กิ่งซางเล็ก ต.หลักสอง) is a Muay Thai fighter. His experience level spans a decade competing at Bangkok's stadiums. Gingsanglek challenged Kongthoranee for his Rajadamnern lightweight title but in the last round was stopped late.

== Titles and accomplishments ==
- Omnoi Stadium
  - 2020 Siam Omnoi Stadium 135 lbs Champion (one defense)
- ONE Championship
  - Performance of the Night (One time) vs. (Chorfah Tor.Sangtiennoi)

Awards

- 2015 Siam Kela Young Fighter of the Year

== Fight record ==
Muay Thai record
Date	Result	Opponent	Event	Location	Method	Round	Time
2026-08-14	Win	(United States) Dmitri Ramos	ONE Friday Fights 166, Lumpinee Stadium	Bangkok, Thailand	KO (Punches and elbow)	2	1:13
2026-03-20	Loss	(Thailand) Yodlekpet Or.Atchariya	ONE Friday Fights 147, Lumpinee Stadium	Bangkok, Thailand	KO (Right hook)	3	1:25
2025-12-19	Win	(Thailand) Suriyanlek Por.Yenying	ONE Friday Fights 137, Lumpinee Stadium	Bangkok, Thailand	Decision (Unanimous)	3	3:00
2025-08-15	Win	(Myanmar) Thant Zin	ONE Friday Fights 120, Lumpinee Stadium	Bangkok, Thailand	TKO (3 Knockdowns)	1	1:11
2025-07-04	Win	(Russia) Alexey Balyko	ONE Friday Fights 115, Lumpinee Stadium	Bangkok, Thailand	KO (Spinning backfist)	1	0:53
2025-03-05	Win	(Thailand) Petchbangsaen Sor.Boonyiem	Muay Thai Palangmai, Rajadamnern Stadium	Bangkok, Thailand	KO (Elbow)	3	
2024-11-08	Loss	(Russia) Egor Bikrev	ONE Friday Fights 89, Lumpinee Stadium	Bangkok, Thailand	TKO (Right cross)	1	1:45
2024-01-19	Loss	(Algeria) Joachim Ouraghi	ONE Friday Fights 48, Lumpinee Stadium	Bangkok, Thailand	KO (Left hook to the body)	2	1:49
2023-06-23	Loss	(Thailand) Kongthoranee Sor.Sommai	ONE Friday Fights 22, Lumpinee Stadium	Bangkok, Thailand	KO (Left hook)	2	0:28
2023-04-28	Win	(Thailand) Chorfah Tor.Sangtiennoi	ONE Friday Fights 14, Lumpinee Stadium	Bangkok, Thailand	KO (Left high kick)	2	0:14
2023-02-24	Loss	(Thailand) Kongthoranee Sor.Sommai	ONE Friday Fights 6, Lumpinee Stadium	Bangkok, Thailand	KO (Left hook)	2	1:02
2022-12-09	Win	(Thailand) Yodkitsada Yuthachonburi	Rajadamnern World Series	Bangkok, Thailand	TKO (Doctor stoppage)	2	
2022-11-09	Loss	(Thailand) Yodtongthai Sor.Sommai	Muay Thai Palangmai, Rajadamnern Stadium	Bangkok, Thailand	DQ (kick to a downed opponent)	2	
2022-09-23	Win	(Uganda) Josiah ChokdeeGym	Rajadamnern World Series	Bangkok, Thailand	TKO (Elbows)	2	0:54
2022-08-19	Win	(Uzbekistan) Nur VenumMuayThai	Rajadamnern World Series	Bangkok, Thailand	Decision	3	3:00
2022-03-20	Loss	(Thailand) Kongthoranee Sor.Sommai	Chang Muaythai Kiatphet, Rajadamnern Stadium	Bangkok, Thailand	TKO (Doctor stoppage)	5	
For the vacant Rajadamnern Stadium Lightweight (135 lbs) title.
2022-02-13	Win	(Thailand) Songkom Bangkokalaiyon	Chang MuayThai Kiatpetch Amarin Super Fight, Rajadamnern Stadium	Bangkok, Thailand	KO (low kick)	3	
2021-12-23	Loss	(Thailand) Yok Parunchai	Ruamponkon Songkhla	Songkhla, Thailand	Decision	5	3:00
2021-11-14	Loss	(Thailand) Nakrob Fairtex	Channel 7 Stadium	Bangkok, Thailand	TKO	5	
2021-04-24	Win	(Thailand) Kongthoranee Sor.Sommai	Omnoi Boxing Stadium	Samut Sakhon, Thailand	Decision	5	3:00
Defends Omnoi Boxing Stadium 135 lbs title.
2020-11-17	Win	(Thailand) Yodkitsada Yuthachonburi	Sor.Sommai	Nakhon Ratchasima, Thailand	Decision	5	3:00
2020-09-26	Win	(Thailand) Phetmorakot Teeded99	Omnoi Boxing Stadium	Samut Sakhon, Thailand	TKO (Low Kicks)	2	
Wins Omnoi Boxing Stadium 135 lbs title.
2020-02-24	Win	(Thailand) Luknimit Singklongsi	Rajadamnern Stadium	Bangkok, Thailand	Decision	5	3:00
2020-01-08	Loss	(Thailand) Thanonchai Thanakorngym	Rajadamnern Stadium	Bangkok, Thailand	KO (Left Straight)	3	
2019-10-17	Win	(Thailand) Salatan ToyotaRayong	Rajadamnern Stadium	Bangkok, Thailand	KO	4	
2019-08-07	Win	(Thailand) Suriyanlek Aor.Bor.Tor.Kampee	Rajadamnern Stadium	Bangkok, Thailand	Decision	5	3:00
2019-06-06	Loss	(Thailand) Apiwat Sor.Somnuek	Rajadamnern Stadium	Bangkok, Thailand	Decision	5	3:00
2019-04-11	Win	(Thailand) Phetkriangkrai Tor.Silachai	Rajadamnern Stadium	Bangkok, Thailand	KO (High Kick)	5	
2019-03-31	Loss	(Cambodia) Lorn Panha	Wurkz Boxing	Phnom Penh, Cambodia	Decision	5	3:00
2018-06-21	Loss	(Thailand) Phetpangan Mor.Ratanabandit	Rajadamnern Stadium	Bangkok, Thailand	Decision	5	3:00
2018-02-17	Win	(Thailand) Samernai WorPor.AngThong	Omnoi stadium	Samut Sakhon, Thailand	KO	2	
2017-11-02	Loss	(Thailand) Chocknamchai Gor.Suwantat	Rajadamnern Stadium	Bangkok, Thailand	Decision	5	3:00
2017-09-06	Loss	(Thailand) Pichitchai P.K.Saenchai	Rajadamnern Stadium	Bangkok, Thailand	KO	4	
2017-07-13	Win	(Thailand) Phayakmongkol Teeded99	Rajadamnern Stadium	Bangkok, Thailand	KO	5	
2017-06-07	Loss	(Thailand) Kumandoi Petcharoenvit	Rajadamnern Stadium	Bangkok, Thailand	Decision	5	3:00
2017-05-03	Win	(Thailand) Roicheng Singmawin	Rajadamnern Stadium	Bangkok, Thailand	Decision	5	3:00
2017-03-30	Loss	(Thailand) Saoek Sitchefboontham	Rajadamnern Stadium	Bangkok, Thailand	Decision	5	3:00
2017-02-09	Loss	(Thailand) Saoek Sitchefboontham	Rajadamnern Stadium	Bangkok, Thailand	Decision	5	3:00
2016-12-21	Loss	(Thailand) Puenkon Tor.Surat	Rajadamnern Stadium	Bangkok, Thailand	KO (Left Knee to the Body)	4	
For the Rajadamnern Stadium 115 lbs title.
2016-11-30	Win	(Thailand) Phetsuphan Por.Daorungruang	Rajadamnern Stadium	Bangkok, Thailand	TKO (Referee Stoppage)	4	
2016-10-13	Loss	(Thailand) Puenkon Tor.Surat	Rajadamnern Stadium	Bangkok, Thailand	Decision	5	3:00
2016-09-14	Win	(Thailand) Phetmuangchon Por.Suantong	Rajadamnern Stadium	Bangkok, Thailand	Decision	5	3:00
2016-08-24	Win	(Thailand) Witthayalek Musaphanmai	Rajadamnern Stadium	Bangkok, Thailand	Decision	5	3:00
2016-08-04	Loss	(Thailand) Phetmuangchon Por.Suantong	Rajadamnern Stadium	Bangkok, Thailand	Decision	5	3:00
2016-07-05	Loss	(Thailand) Priewpak Sor.Jor.Vichitpedriw	Lumpinee Stadium	Bangkok, Thailand	Decision	5	3:00
2016-06-09	Draw	(Thailand) Phetmuangnon Jitmuangon	Lumpinee Stadium	Bangkok, Thailand	Decision	5	3:00
2016-06-09	Loss	(Thailand) Saiyanlek P.k.Saenchai	Rajadamnern Stadium	Bangkok, Thailand	Decision	5	3:00
2016-02-24	Win	(Thailand) Witthayalek Musaphanmai	Rajadamnern Stadium	Bangkok, Thailand	KO (Left Elbow)	2	
2015-12-19	Win	(Thailand) Detrir Por.Telakun	Rajadamnern Stadium	Bangkok, Thailand	Decision	5	3:00
2015-11-19	Win	(Thailand) Suayai Chor.Hapayak	Rajadamnern Stadium	Bangkok, Thailand	KO (Left Elbow)	3	
2015-10-07	Win	(Thailand) Chaiyo Petchyindee Academy	Rajadamnern Stadium	Bangkok, Thailand	Decision	5	3:00
2015-09-04	Win	(Thailand) Rakhangtong Mor.Chombueng Rajabhat	Rajadamnern Stadium	Bangkok, Thailand	KO (Left Elbow)	3	
2015-07-29	Loss	(Thailand) Ruangsaknoi Sitniwat	Rajadamnern Stadium	Bangkok, Thailand	Disqualification		
2015-06-24	Win	(Thailand) Denkraingkrai Kiatphontip	Rajadamnern Stadium	Bangkok, Thailand	Decision	5	3:00
2015-04-30	Win	(Thailand) Chatpichit Sor.Jor.Vichitpedriw	Onesongchai, Rajadamnern Stadium	Bangkok, Thailand	KO	4	
2015-03-02	Win	(Thailand) Jatukam Petchrungruang	Rajadamnern Stadium	Bangkok, Thailand	Decision	5	3:00
Wins the 1 million baht side-bet.
2015-01-28	Win	(Thailand) Bonpukbow Mor.Rattanabandit	Rajadamnern Stadium	Bangkok, Thailand	Decision	5	3:00
2014-12-31	Win	(Thailand) Kaodeng Sujibamikiew	Rajadamnern Stadium	Bangkok, Thailand	KO	2	
2014-12-01	Win	(Thailand) Denkraingkrai Kiatphontip	Rajadamnern Stadium	Bangkok, Thailand	Decision	5	3:00
2014-10-23	Win	(Thailand) Denkraingkrai Kiatphontip	Rajadamnern Stadium	Bangkok, Thailand	Decision	5	3:00
2014-06-02	Loss	(Thailand) Ruangsaknoi Sitniwat	Rajadamnern Stadium	Bangkok, Thailand	Decision	5	3:00
2014-05-07	Win	(Thailand) Suvarnabhumi STD Transport	Rajadamnern Stadium	Bangkok, Thailand	Decision	5	3:00
2014-03-14	Win	(Thailand) Ruangsaknoi Sitniwat	Lumpinee Stadium	Bangkok, Thailand	Decision	5	3:00
Legend: Win Loss Draw/No contest Notes
