= Phetsukumvit Boybangna =

Thai Muay Thai fighter

- Born: June 20, 1998 (age 28); Nakhon Si Thammarat province, Thailand
- Other names: Petsukumvit Boi Bangna; Phetsukumwit Or.Daokrajai (เพชรสุขุมวิท อ.ดาวกระจาย); Reya Por.Onnut (เรยา ป.อ่อนนุช)
- Nationality: Thai
- Height: 169 cm (5 ft 7 in)
- Weight: 61 kg (134 lb; 9.6 st)
- Fighting out of: Bangkok, Thailand
- Team: An Sukhumvit

Phetsukumvit Boybangna (Thai: เพชรสุขุมวิท บอยบางนา) is a Thai Muay Thai fighter.

== Career ==
=== Rajadamnern champion ===
Phetsukhumvit was scheduled to face Yodtongthai Sor.Sommai for the vacant Rajadamnern Stadium 130lbs title on December 3, 2020. He lost the fight by decision.

On March 13, 2022, Phetsukhumvit faced Yodwittaya SirilakMuaythai for the vacant Rajadamnern Stadium 130 lbs title. He won the fight by knockout in the third round.

On August 13, 2022, Phetsukhumvit faced Chalam Parunchai in Ko Samui. He lost the fight by decision.

On September 11, 2022, Phetsukhumvit travelled to Kazakhstan as part of a diplomatic mission to participate in an event celebrating the thirty years of the Thai-Kazakh relations. He faced Yodkitsada Yuthachonburi in the main event and won by decision. As of December 2022 Phetsukhumvit was ranked #3 in the world at 130 lbs by the World Muaythai Organization.

=== ONE Championship ===
On February 3, 2023, Phetsukhumvit defeated Chorfah Tor.Sangtiennoi by unanimous decision at ONE Friday Fights 3. For his second fight on ONE Lumpinee Phetsukhumvit knocked out Petchmuangsri Tded99 in the second round with punches at ONE Friday Fights 8 on March 10, 2023. He received a 350,000 baht performance bonus for this victory. As of March 2023 Phetsukhumvit was the #1 ranked 130 lbs muay thai fighter in the world according to the WBC Muay Thai.
Phetsukhumvit won his third fight in a row with ONE Championship when he defeated Kongthoranee Sor.Sommai by unanimous decision on April 7, 2023, at ONE Friday Fights 12.

== Titles and accomplishments ==
- Rajadamnern Stadium
  - 2022 Rajadamnern Stadium 130 lbs Champion

== Fight record ==
Muay Thai Record
Date	Result	Opponent	Event	Location	Method	Round	Time
2025-10-31	Loss	(Russia) Rustam Yunusov	ONE Friday Fights 131, Lumpinee Stadium	Bangkok, Thailand	KO (Punches)	1	1:45
2025-06-27	Loss	(Uzbekistan) Aslamjon Ortikov	ONE Friday Fights 114, Lumpinee Stadium	Bangkok, Thailand	KO (Body kick)	3	2:33
2025-06-06	Win	(Romania) Silviu Vitez	ONE Friday Fights 111, Lumpinee Stadium	Bangkok, Thailand	TKO (Punches)	2	1:40
2025-03-23	Win	(Thailand) Mongkoldetlek Por.Pimorn	Channel 7 Stadium	Bangkok, Thailand	KO (Elbow)	3	
2024-05-03	Loss	(Thailand) Duangsompong Jitmuangnon	ONE Friday Fights 61, Lumpinee Stadium	Bangkok, Thailand	Decision (Unanimous)	3	3:00
2024-02-23	Loss	(Thailand) Kongsuk Fairtex	ONE Friday Fights 53, Lumpinee Stadium	Bangkok, Thailand	Decision (Unanimous)	3	3:00
2023-12-22	Loss	(Thailand) Jawsuayai Sor.Dechaphan	ONE Friday Fights 46, Lumpinee Stadium	Bangkok, Thailand	Decision (Majority)	3	3:00
2023-06-09	Loss	(Thailand) Jawsuayai Sor.Dechaphan	ONE Friday Fights 20, Lumpinee Stadium	Bangkok, Thailand	KO (Right cross)	1	2:30
2023-04-07	Win	(Thailand) Kongthoranee Sor.Sommai	ONE Friday Fights 12, Lumpinee Stadium	Bangkok, Thailand	Decision (Unanimous)	3	3:00
2023-03-10	Win	(Thailand) Petchmuangsri Tded99	ONE Friday Fights 8, Lumpinee Stadium	Bangkok, Thailand	KO (Punches)	2	2:36
2023-02-03	Win	(Thailand) Chorfah Tor.Sangtiennoi	ONE Friday Fights 3, Lumpinee Stadium	Bangkok, Thailand	Decision (Unanimous)	3	3:00
2022-11-18	Loss	(Thailand) Kompatak SinbiMuayThai	Ruamponkon + Prachin	Prachinburi province, Thailand	Decision	5	3:00
2022-10-09	Win	(Thailand) Kongkiat Tor.Pran49	Kiatpetch, Rajadamnern Stadium	Bangkok, Thailand	Decision	5	3:00
2022-09-11	Win	(Thailand) Yodkitsada Yuthachonburi	30 Years of the Thai-Kazakh diplomatic mission	Kazakhstan	Decision	5	3:00
2022-08-13	Loss	(Thailand) Chalam Parunchai	Ruamponkon Samui, Petchbuncha Stadium	Ko Samui, Thailand	Decision	5	3:00
2022-06-05	Win	(Thailand) Yodwittaya SirilakMuaythai	Kiatpetch, Rajadamnern Stadium	Bangkok, Thailand	Decision	5	3:00
2022-04-16	Win	(Thailand) Phetpangan Mor.Ratanabandit	Sor.Sommai + Pitaktham	Phayao province, Thailand	KO (Knee to the body)	3	
2022-03-13	Win	(Thailand) Yodwittaya SirilakMuaythai	Kiatpetch, Rajadamnern Stadium	Bangkok, Thailand	KO (Punches + knee to the body)	3	
Wins the vacant Rajadamnern Stadium 130 lbs title.
2022-02-06	Win	(Thailand) Wanchana Or.Boonchuay	Kiatpetch, Rajadamnern Stadium	Bangkok, Thailand	KO (Elbow)	4	
2021-12-20	Win	(Thailand) Jom Parunchai	Singmawin, Rajadamnern Stadium	Bangkok, Thailand	Decision	5	3:00
2021-10-10	Loss	(Thailand) Songkom BangkokAlaiyon	Muaythai 7 see, Channel 7 Stadium	Bangkok, Thailand	Decision	5	3:00
2021-03-20	Win	(Thailand) Chankrit Or.Pimonsri	Muay Thai Lumpinee SuperFight, Lumpinee Stadium	Bangkok, Thailand	Decision	5	3:00
2020-12-03	Loss	(Thailand) Yodtongthai Sor.Sommai	Rajadamnern Stadium	Bangkok, Thailand	Decision	5	3:00
For the vacant Rajadamnern Stadium 130 lbs title
2021-09-24	Win	(Thailand) Pakkahlek Tor.Laksong	Palangmai, Rajadamnern Stadium	Bangkok, Thailand	KO (Low kicks)	4	
2020-08-04	Win	(Thailand) Rittidet Sitchefboontham	Chef Boontham, Thanakorn Stadium	Nakhon Pathom, Thailand	KO (Elbows)	3	
2020-01-08	Win	(Thailand) Rittidet Sitchefboontham	Sor.Sommai	Thailand	Decision	5	3:00
2019-11-27	Loss	(Thailand) Supablack Sor.Jor.ToiPaedRiew	Palangmai, Rajadamnern Stadium	Bangkok, Thailand	Decision	5	3:00
2019-10-21	Win	(Thailand) Numpongnoi Sor.Sommai	Sor.Sommai, Rajadamnern Stadium	Bangkok, Thailand	KO (Right hook)	4	
2019-09-02	Win	(Thailand) Kongkiat Sor.Salacheep	Sor.Sommai, Rajadamnern Stadium	Bangkok, Thailand	Decision	5	3:00
2019-08-01	Win	(Thailand) Numpongnoi Sor.Sommai	Sor.Sommai, Rajadamnern Stadium	Bangkok, Thailand	Decision	5	3:00
2019-07-04	Loss	(Thailand) Yodkitsada Yuthachonburi	Sor.Sommai, Rajadamnern Stadium	Bangkok, Thailand	Decision	5	3:00
2019-05-16	Loss	(Thailand) Jompichit Sitchefboontham	Chef Boontham, Rajadamnern Stadium	Bangkok, Thailand	Decision	5	3:00
2019-04-18	Win	(Thailand) Detfangkong Sirilakmuaythai	Jitmuangnon, Rajadamnern Stadium	Bangkok, Thailand	Decision	5	3:00
2019-01-21	Loss	(Thailand) Petchtaksin Sor.Sommai	Sor.Sommai, Rajadamnern Stadium	Bangkok, Thailand	Decision	5	3:00
2018-12-19	Win	(Thailand) Chaichan Sitkaewprapon	Sor.Sommai, Rajadamnern Stadium	Bangkok, Thailand	KO	3	
2018-09-30	Win	(Thailand) Yodphetek MuaythaiFghterGym	Muaydee Withithai, Blue Arena	Thailand	Decision	5	3:00
2018-08-02	Loss	(Thailand) Jompikart Sitchefboontham	Chef Boontham, Rajadamnern Stadium	Bangkok, Thailand	Decision	5	3:00
2018-07-01	Win	(Thailand) Nikhom Changnunsisaket	Muaydee Withithai, Rangsit Stadium	Pathum Thani, Thailand	Decision	5	3:00
2018-05-20	Win	(Thailand) Phetsiam Jitmuangnon	Muaydee Withithai, Blue Arena	Thailand	Decision	5	3:00
2018-01-08	Loss	(Thailand) Samingdam Chor.Ajalaboon	Jitmuangnon, Rajadamnern Stadium	Bangkok, Thailand	Decision	5	3:00
2017-11-13	Loss	(Thailand) Rambong Lisorkanka	Chujaroen, Rajadamnern Stadium	Bangkok, Thailand	KO (Left hook)	3	
2017-09-03	Loss	(Thailand) Petchsuntree Jitmuangnon	Muaydee Withithai, Rangsit Stadium	Pathum Thani, Thailand	KO	3	
2017-08-05	Loss	(Thailand) Toto Tor.Tawad	Omnoi Stadium	Samut Sakhon, Thailand	Decision	5	3:00
2017-04-16	Loss	(Thailand) Prakaypetch Nitisamui	Channel 5, Rangsit Stadium	Pathum Thani, Thailand	Decision	5	3:00
2017-03-27	Win	(Thailand) Chebkiat Por.Pongsawang	Ruamponkon Paedriew, Lumpinee Stadium	Bangkok, Thailand	Decision	5	3:00
2017-02-28	Win	(Thailand) Chebkiat Por.Pongsawang	Ruamponkon Paedriew, Lumpinee Stadium	Bangkok, Thailand	Decision	5	3:00
2017-01-27	Loss	(Thailand) Chebkiat Por.Pongsawang	Pumpanmuang, Lumpinee Stadium	Bangkok, Thailand	Decision	5	3:00
2017-01-01	Win	(Thailand) Dekban Sor.Sommai	Muaydee Withithai, Rangsit Stadium	Pathum Thani, Thailand	KO	4	
2016-12-08	Win	(Thailand) Kaewmai Sor.Sommai	Sor.Sommai, Rajadamnern Stadium	Bangkok, Thailand	Decision	5	3:00
2016-10-03	Win	(Thailand) Jaksiam Maekchandi	Sor.Sommai, Rajadamnern Stadium	Bangkok, Thailand	Decision	5	3:00
Legend: Win Loss Draw/No contest Notes
