= ONE Fight Night 36 =

Combat sport events in 2025

ONE Fight Night 36: Prajanchai vs. Di Bella 2
- Promotion: ONE Championship
- Date: October 4, 2025
- Venue: Lumpinee Boxing Stadium
- City: Bangkok, Thailand

Event chronology
ONE Fight Night 35: Buntan vs. Hemetsberger	ONE Fight Night 36: Prajanchai vs. Di Bella 2	ONE Fight Night 37: Kryklia vs. Agdeve

ONE Fight Night 36: Prajanchai vs. Di Bella 2 was a combat sports event produced by ONE Championship that took place on October 4, 2025, at Lumpinee Boxing Stadium in Bangkok, Thailand.

== Background ==
A rematch of ONE Strawweight Kickboxing World Championship unification bout between current champion (also a current ONE Strawweight Muay Thai World Champion) Prajanchai P.K.Saenchai and interim champion Jonathan Di Bella headlined the event. The pairing previously met at ONE Friday Fights 68 in June 2024, when Prajanchai captured the vacant title by unanimous decision.

At the weigh-ins, one fighter failed to hydration test and missed weight for their respective fights:

- Fabricio Andrey weighed in at 157.6 pounds, 2.6 pounds over the featherweight limit and he was fined 30 percent of his purse which went to Eduardo Granzotto.

== Results ==
Fight card (Amazon Prime Video)
Weight class				Method	Round	Time	Notes
Strawweight Kickboxing	Jonathan Di Bella (ic)	def.	Prajanchai P.K.Saenchai (c)	Decision (unanimous)	5	3:00	(Note: For the ONE Strawweight Kickboxing World Championship.)
Middleweight	Aung La Nsang	def.	Zebaztian Kadestam	TKO (knee and punches)	2	2:21
Flyweight Muay Thai	Aslamjon Ortikov	def.	Kongthoranee Sor.Sommai	Decision (unanimous)	3	3:00
Flyweight	Mansur Malachiev	def.	Jarred Brooks	Technical Submission (north-south choke)	2	2:09
Flyweight	Sanzhar Zakirov	def.	Hu Yong	Decision (unanimous)	3	5:00
Flyweight Muay Thai	Akif Guluzada	def.	Jaosuayai Mor. Krungthepthonburi	Decision (unanimous)	3	3:00
Featherweight Submission Grappling	Fabricio Andrey	def.	Eduardo Granzotto	Decision (unanimous)	1	10:00	(Note: Andrey missed weight (157.6 lb).)
Women's Atomweight Muay Thai	Selina Flores	def.	Marie McManamon	Decision (unanimous)	3	3:00
Lightweight	Shozo Isojima	def.	Nicolas Vigna	TKO (elbows and punches)	2	4:19

== Bonus awards ==
The following fighters received $50,000 bonuses:

- Performance of the Night: Jonathan Di Bella, Aung La Nsang and Shozo Isojima

== See also ==
- 2025 in ONE Championship
- List of ONE Championship events
- List of current ONE fighters
- ONE Championship Rankings
