= Kongthoranee Sor.Sommai =

Thai Muay Thai fighter

- Born: Ratchanon Meekan; November 16, 1996 (age 29); Chon Daen, Phetchabun, Thailand
- Height: 170 cm (5 ft 7 in)
- Division: Super Bantamweight; Lightweight
- Style: Muay Thai (Muay Femur)
- Stance: Southpaw
- Fighting out of: Bangkok, Thailand
- Team: Sor.Sommai

Ratchanon Meekan (born November 16, 1996), known professionally as Kongthoranee Sor.Sommai (Thai: ก้องธรณี ส.สมหมาย), is a Thai Muay Thai fighter. He is a former two-division Rajadamnern Stadium champion.

== Titles and accomplishments ==
- Professional Boxing Association of Thailand (PAT)
  - 2021 Thailand Lightweight (135 lbs) Champion
- Rajadamnern Stadium
  - 2018 Rajadamnern Stadium Super Bantamweight (122 lbs) Champion (1 defense)
  - 2022 Rajadamnern Stadium Lightweight (135 lbs) Champion

== Fight record ==
Muay Thai Record
Date	Result	Opponent	Event	Location	Method	Round	Time
2026-11-07	Loss	(Japan) Taiki Naito	ONE Fight Night 49	Bangkok, Thailand	Decision (Unanimous)	3	3:00
2026-09-25	Win	(China) Yuan Pengjie	ONE The Inner Circle 32, Lumpinee Stadium	Bangkok, Thailand	Decision (Unanimous)	3	3:00
2026-06-26	Loss	(Thailand) Nong-O Hama	ONE The Inner Circle 22, Lumpinee Stadium	Bangkok, Thailand	Decision (Unanimous)	3	3:00
2026-01-23	Loss	(Russia) Asadula Imangazaliev	ONE Fight Night 39	Bangkok, Thailand	KO (Left hook to the body)	2	1:06
2025-10-03	Loss	(Uzbekistan) Aslamjon Ortikov	ONE Fight Night 36	Bangkok, Thailand	Decision (Unanimous)	3	3:00
2025-05-03	Loss	(Thailand) Nong-O Hama	ONE Fight Night 31	Bangkok, Thailand	Decision (Unanimous)	3	3:00
2025-02-28	Win	(Thailand) Nong-O Hama	ONE Fight Night 28	Bangkok, Thailand	Decision (Split)	3	3:00
2024-12-07	Win	(Thailand) Nakrob Fairtex	ONE Fight Night 26	Bangkok, Thailand	Decision (Unanimous)	3	3:00
2024-11-09	Win	(Russia) Tagir Khalilov	ONE 169	Bangkok, Thailand	Decision (Unanimous)	3	3:00
2024-06-28	Loss	(Thailand) Superlek Kiatmuu9	ONE Friday Fights 68, Lumpinee Stadium	Bangkok, Thailand	Decision (Unanimous)	3	3:00
2024-04-05	Win	(Thailand) Jawsuayai Sor.Dechaphan	ONE Friday Fights 58, Lumpinee Stadium	Bangkok, Thailand	Decision (Unanimous)	3	3:00
2024-01-19	Win	(Russia) Sharif Mazoriev	ONE Friday Fights 48, Lumpinee Stadium	Bangkok, Thailand	Decision (Unanimous)	3	3:00
2023-12-01	Win	(Iran) Parsa Aminipour	ONE Friday Fights 43, Lumpinee Stadium	Bangkok, Thailand	KO (Elbow)	3	1:07
2023-10-20	Win	(Japan) Taiki Naito	ONE Friday Fights 37, Lumpinee Stadium	Bangkok, Thailand	Decision (Unanimous)	3	3:00
2023-09-01	Win	(Kyrgyzstan) Sherzod Kabutov	ONE Friday Fights 31, Lumpinee Stadium	Bangkok, Thailand	Decision (Unanimous)	3	3:00
2023-06-23	Win	(Thailand) Gingsanglek Tor.Laksong	ONE Friday Fights 22, Lumpinee Stadium	Bangkok, Thailand	KO (Left hook)	2	0:28
2023-05-12	Win	(Thailand) ET Tded99	ONE Friday Fights 16, Lumpinee Stadium	Bangkok, Thailand	Decision (Majority)	3	3:00
2023-04-07	Loss	(Thailand) Phetsukumvit Boybangna	ONE Friday Fights 12, Lumpinee Stadium	Bangkok, Thailand	Decision (Unanimous)	3	3:00
2023-02-24	Win	(Thailand) Gingsanglek Tor.Laksong	ONE Friday Fights 6, Lumpinee Stadium	Bangkok, Thailand	KO (Left hook)	2	1:02
2023-01-09	Win	(Thailand) Petchthonglor JoeNuvo	Muay Thai Pantamit	Chiang Rai, Thailand	Decision	5	3:00
2022-12-17	Win	(Thailand) Petchseenin Tded99	Omnoi Stadium	Samut Sakhon, Thailand	KO (Elbow)	4	
2022-11-20	Loss	(Thailand) Jom Parunchai	Channel 7 Stadium	Bangkok, Thailand	Decision	5	3:00
2022-08-31	Win	(Thailand) Prajanban SorJor.VichitMuangPadriew	Muay Thai Palangmai, Rajadamnern Stadium	Bangkok, Thailand	Decision	5	3:00
2022-08-02	Loss	(Thailand) Kompatak SinbiMuayThai	Birthday Pitaktham Super Fight	Songkhla province, Thailand	Decision	5	3:00
2022-06-26	Loss	(Thailand) Jom Parunchai	Chang Muaythai Kiatphet, Rajadamnern Stadium	Bangkok, Thailand	Decision	5	3:00
Loses the Rajadamnern Stadium Lightweight (135 lbs) title.
2022-04-16	Loss	(Thailand) Kompatak FighterMuayThai	Sor.Sommai + Pitaktham	Phayao province, Thailand	Decision	5	3:00
2022-03-20	Win	(Thailand) Gingsanglek Tor.Laksong	Chang Muaythai Kiatphet, Rajadamnern Stadium	Bangkok, Thailand	TKO (Doctor stoppage)	5	
Wins the vacant Rajadamnern Stadium Lightweight (135 lbs) title.
2022-02-27	Win	(Thailand) Kampitewada Nayok-Ek Anglim	Muaydee Vithithai+Jitmuangnont, Nontaburi Stadium	Bangkok, Thailand	Decision	5	3:00
2021-12-04	Win	(Thailand) Buakiew Por.Paoin	Omnoi Stadium	Samut Sakhon, Thailand	Decision	5	3:00
2021-11-13	Win	(Thailand) Chatpayak Chor.Hapayak	Suekjao Muaythai, Omnoi Stadium	Samut Sakhon, Thailand	KO (Left Cross)	1	
Wins the Thailand Lightweight (135 lbs) title.
2021-04-24	Loss	(Thailand) Gingsanglek Tor.Laksong	Omnoi Stadium	Samut Sakhon, Thailand	Decision	5	3:00
For the Omnoi Stadium Lightweight (135 lbs) title.
2021-03-15	Win	(Thailand) Chatpayak Chor.Hapayak	Rajadamnern Stadium	Bangkok, Thailand	Decision	5	3:00
2020-12-12	Loss	(Thailand) Petchmanee Por.Lakboon	Isuzu Cup, Omnoi Stadium	Samut Sakhon, Thailand	Decision	5	3:00
2020-11-07	Win	(Thailand) Teeradet Chor.Hapayak	Isuzu Cup, Omnoi Stadium	Samut Sakhon, Thailand	KO (Elbow)	4	
2020-10-10	Loss	(Thailand) Extra Rongsamak-OrBorJor.Udon	Isuzu Cup, Omnoi Stadium	Samut Sakhon, Thailand	Decision	5	3:00
2020-08-14	Loss	(Thailand) Dechsakda SorJor.TongPrachin	Muaymanwansuk, Rangsit Stadium	Rangsit, Thailand	Decision	5	3:00
2019-12-26	Loss	(Thailand) Phetpangan Mor.Ratanabandit	Rajadamnern Stadium	Bangkok, Thailand	Decision	5	3:00
2019-12-04	Loss	(Thailand) Kiewpayak Jitmuangnon	Rajadamnern Stadium	Bangkok, Thailand	Decision (Unanimous)	5	3:00
2019-10-29	Win	(Thailand) Kompatak SinbiMuayThai	Lumpinee Stadium	Bangkok, Thailand	Decision	5	3:00
2019-09-02	Loss	(Thailand) Phetpangan Mor.Ratanabandit	Rajadamnern Stadium	Bangkok, Thailand	Decision	5	3:00
2019-07-09	Win	(Thailand) Sing Parunchai	Lumpinee Stadium	Bangkok, Thailand	KO (Left high kick)	2	
2019-04-25	Win	(Thailand) Phetpangan Mor.Ratanabandit	Rajadamnern Stadium	Bangkok, Thailand	Decision	5	3:00
2019-03-14	Win	(Thailand) Padetsuk Kor.Kampanath	Rajadamnern Stadium	Bangkok, Thailand	Decision	5	3:00
Defends the Rajadamnern Stadium Super Bantamweight (122 lbs) title.
2019-02-14	Loss	(Thailand) Yodkhunsuk Mor.Chombueng Rajabhat	Rajadamnern Stadium	Bangkok, Thailand	Decision	5	3:00
2018-10-18	Draw	(Thailand) Prajanban Sor.Jor.Vichitpadriew	Rajadamnern Stadium	Bangkok, Thailand	Decision	5	3:00
2018-08-23	Win	(Thailand) Puenkon Diamond98	Rajadamnern Stadium	Bangkok, Thailand	KO (left high kick)	4	2:00
2018-06-28	Win	(Thailand) Yodkhunsuk Mor.Chombueng Rajabhat	Rajadamnern Stadium	Bangkok, Thailand	Decision	5	3:00
Wins the Rajadamnern Stadium Super Bantamweight (122 lbs) title.
2018-05-17	Win	(Thailand) Phetrung Sitnayokkaipadriew	Rajadamnern Stadium	Bangkok, Thailand	Decision	5	3:00
2018-03-12	Win	(Thailand) Boonlong Klongsuanpluresort	Rajadamnern Stadium	Bangkok, Thailand	Decision	5	3:00
2018-01-31	Win	(Thailand) Somraknoi Muayded 789	Rajadamnern Stadium	Bangkok, Thailand	Decision	5	3:00
2017-12-30	Win	(Thailand) Kaokarat Jitmuangnon	Omnoi Stadium	Thailand	KO (Left cross)	4	
2017-11-15	Loss	(Thailand) Teptaksin Sor.Sonsing	Rajadamnern Stadium	Bangkok, Thailand	Decision	5	3:00
2017-08-31	Win	(Thailand) Saoek Kesagym	Rajadamnern Stadium	Bangkok, Thailand	KO (left elbow)	4	
2017-07-10	Loss	(Thailand) Chamuakphet Lukpabath	Rajadamnern Stadium	Bangkok, Thailand	Decision	5	3:00
2017-04-06	Win	(Thailand) Yodbuadaeng The glaff Pattaya	Rajadamnern Stadium	Bangkok, Thailand	Decision	5	3:00
2017-03-09	Win	(Thailand) Saotho Kesagym	Rajadamnern Stadium	Bangkok, Thailand	Decision	5	3:00
2017-02-09	Win	(Thailand) Phetrungroth Ror.Keracorath	Rajadamnern Stadium	Bangkok, Thailand	Decision	5	3:00
2017-01-04	Win	(Thailand) Rit Jitmuangnon	Rajadamnern Stadium	Bangkok, Thailand	Decision	5	3:00
2016-11-23	Win	(Thailand) Saeng-Ada Petchtepha-Farm	Rajadamnern Stadium	Bangkok, Thailand	KO	4	
2016-08-31	Win	(Thailand) Phetsiwa Sor.Kittichai	Rajadamnern Stadium	Bangkok, Thailand	Decision	5	3:00
2016-06-26	Win	(Thailand) Nontachai Sor.Kanjana	Rajadamnern Stadium	Bangkok, Thailand	KO	4	
2016-05-12	Loss	(Thailand) Chatploy Sor.Poonsawat	Rajadamnern Stadium	Bangkok, Thailand	KO	5	
2016-03-24	Loss	(Thailand) Saoek Kesagym	Rajadamnern Stadium	Bangkok, Thailand	Decision	5	3:00
2016-02-25	Win	(Thailand) Kiewpilin Sor.Kittichai	Rajadamnern Stadium	Bangkok, Thailand	KO	2	
2016-01-18	Loss	(Thailand) Saoek Kesagym	Rajadamnern Stadium	Bangkok, Thailand	Decision	5	3:00
2015-12-24	Win	(Thailand) Phetsakon F.A.Group	Rajadamnern Stadium	Bangkok, Thailand	KO	5	
2015-10-19	Loss	(Thailand) ToTo Tor.Thawat	Rajadamnern Stadium	Bangkok, Thailand	Decision	5	3:00
2015-09-07	Loss	(Thailand) Cherry Duangjaiphor	Rajadamnern Stadium	Bangkok, Thailand	Decision	5	3:00
2015-08-05	Win	(Thailand) Den Sor.PhetUdon	Rajadamnern Stadium	Bangkok, Thailand	Decision	5	3:00
2015-02-09	Loss	(Thailand) Sayanlek Sayangym	Rajadamnern Stadium	Bangkok, Thailand	Decision	5	3:00
2015-01-07	Loss	(Thailand) Chatploy Sor.Poonsawat	Rajadamnern Stadium	Bangkok, Thailand	Decision	5	3:00
2014-11-20	Loss	(Thailand) Mongkonngoen Tor.Morsi	Rajadamnern Stadium	Bangkok, Thailand	Decision	5	3:00
2014-09-11	Win	(Thailand) Kiewpayak Jitmuangnon	Rajadamnern Stadium	Bangkok, Thailand	Decision	5	3:00
2014-06-26	Win	(Thailand) Kiewpayak Jitmuangnon	Rajadamnern Stadium	Bangkok, Thailand	Decision	5	3:00
2014-04-21	Win	(Thailand) Narongdej A.Wanchet	Rajadamnern Stadium	Bangkok, Thailand	Decision	5	3:00
Legend: Win Loss Draw/No contest Notes

1. Kongthoranee Sor.Sommai
