= Nadaka Yoshinari =

Japanese professional Muay Thai fighter

- Born: Yoshinari Nadaka; January 8, 2001 (age 25); Yokosuka, Kanagawa, Japan
- Native name: 吉成 名高
- Other names: Nadaka Eiwa Sports Gym (นาดากะ เอวะสปอร์ตยิม)
- Height: 165 cm (5 ft 5 in)
- Division: Pinweight; Mini Flyweight; Light Flyweight; Flyweight; Super Flyweight
- Style: Muay Thai
- Stance: Southpaw
- Fighting out of: Yokosuka, Kanagawa, Japan
- Team: Succeed Gym; Chewting Muaythai Gym; Eiwa Sports Gym (present)
- Trainer: Khundong Por.Tawachai
- Years active: 2015 - present

Kickboxing record
- Total: 79
- Wins: 72
- By knockout: 45
- Losses: 6
- By knockout: 0
- Draws: 1
- No contests: 0

Other information
- Occupation: Muay Thai instructor
- Notable relatives: Shimon Yoshinari (cousin)
- Notable school: Renaissance High School/Uraga Junior High School
- Website: http://www.nadaka-eiwa.com/

Nadaka Yoshinari (吉成 名高, Yoshinari Nadaka; born January 8, 2001) is a Japanese professional Muay Thai fighter and kickboxer and the current inaugural ONE Championship Atomweight Muay Thai world champion. He is a five division champion and has formerly held Lumpinee, Rajadamnern, Thailand (PAT), WMC, WPMF, WBC, and IBF titles.

Known in Thailand as Nadaka Eiwa Sports Gym (Thai: นาดากะ เอวะสปอร์ตยิม) he made his professional debut aged 14 at Lumpinee Stadium. Nadaka is the only foreign fighter in history to become a three division Rajadamnern champion and just the second foreigner after Youssef Boughanem to win a title at both Lumpinee Stadium and Rajadamnern Stadium.

== Biography ==
=== Amateur career ===
On December 12, 2015, Nadaka fought against Hidenojo Shimizu (40 kg class #2) for the vacant title of SMASHERS 40 kg class championship, and won by unanimous decision. He was rated #1 at 40 kg class and won 16th belt in his career.

=== Professional career ===
In 2015 Nadaka had his first bout at 14 in Lumpinee Stadium defeating Phansaeng Sakwarun by decision.

On April 3, 2016, Nadaka fought against Riichi Hoshino, and won by majority decision after 3R.

On May 6, Nadaka challenged for Isan Area (North-East area in Thailand) 42 kg class title in Buriram Province, Thailand, but lost by decision after 5R.

=== Winning WMC, WBC and IBF titles ===
On November 13, 2016, Nadaka challenged Shushap Tor Ittiporn for his WMC Pinweight World title, but he lost by unanimous decision.

On April 9, 2017, Nadaka fought against Yaksaed Siriluck Muaythai for the vacant WMC World Pinweight title, and won by KO.

=== Winning Lumpinee and Rajadamnern Stadium titles ===
On December 9, 2018, Nadaka fought against Hercules Phetsimean, the Rajadamnern & Lumpinee unified Mini flyweight champion, for his Rajadamnern titile, and he won by unanimous decision after 5R.

On February 7, 2019, Nadaka fought against Bakjo Auddonmuang at Lumpinee in Bangkok, Thailand as a non-title 106 lbs bout and won by TKO with a left cross at 3R. Originally, he was going to fight against Olaylek Sor.Kaenjai.

On February 24, 2019, Nadaka fought against Bigone Sor.Sirilux for the vacant title of Lumpinee Stadium of Japan (LPNJ) Mini flyweight championship, and this bout was also for Nadaka's test match for challenging Lumpinee Stadium title. He knocked out Bigone by KO with left body hook at 1R 2:29.

On April 14, 2019, Nadako fought against Singdum Kafaefogus for the vacant title of Lumpinee Mini flyweight championship which had been returned by Hercules Phetsimean, and he won by unanimous decision after 5R. Nadaka became the current champion of 3 titles of Lumpinee, Rajadamnern, and International Boxing Federation Muaythai.

Yoshinari fought Kengkla Numponthep for the vacant Muay Thai Naikhanomtom Association (MNA) Light Flyweight title, in June 2019. He won the fight by unanimous decision.

In his next fight, on July 18, 2019, Yoshinari fought Isantai Sitchefboontham for the IBF Muay Thai World Light Flyweight title. Sitchefboontham won the fight by decision.

=== BoM Flyweight champion ===
In December 2019, Yoshinari participated in the Battle of Muay Thai Flyweight tournament, to crown the new BoM Flyweight champion. In the semifinals, he knocked Lee Ji Sung out midway through the first round. In the finals, Yoshinari knocked Chi Yeung Fung out, with a head kick in the first round.

In 2020, Yoshinari fought three times: he won a unanimous decision against Takuto Wor.Wanchai at BOM WAVE 01, a second round TKO of Yuushin at Rizin 22, and a second round knockout of Hidetora Abe at BOM WAVE 02. In his last fight of the year, Yoshinari was scheduled to fight Phetmalai Phetjaroenvit at Rizin 26. He knocked Phetmalai out in the first round.

Yoshinari was scheduled to fight Ibuki Bravely at BOM WAVE 04. He won the fight by a first-round left elbow knockout.

Yoshinari faced Chiakai, under kickboxing rules, at Rizin 29 – Osaka. He won the fight by a first-round technical knockout, after the ringside doctor stopped the fight in between the rounds.

Yoshinari faced Hitoshi Sato at BOM – ouroboros 2021 – on September 26, 2021. He won the fight by a first-round knockout.

Yoshinari faced Naoki Ishikawa at Rizin 31 - Yokohama on October 24, 2021. He won the bout via TKO after knocking down his opponent three times in the first round.

Yoshinari faced Khun NamIsan Shobukai for the WBC Muay Thai Super Bantamweight Nai Khanom Tom Challenge title at BOM WAVE 07 – Get Over The COVID-19 on December 5, 2021. He won the fight by unanimous decision.

Yoshinari was booked to face Yusei Shirahata at Rizin Landmark 2 on March 6, 2022. He won the fight by a second-round knockout.

Yoshinari was scheduled to face Phetnipon Sak.ChorRorBor for the Thailand flyweight (50.8 kg) championship at BOM WAVE 08 on April 24, 2022. Due to covid restrictions Phetnipon was replaced on short notice by Keito Naito. The bout would be competed at 55 kg, the heaviest weight in career for Nadaka. Nadaka won the fight by technical knockout in the second round when Naito's corner threw the towel after their fighter was knocked down for the third time.

Yoshinari was rescheduled to face Phetnipon Sak.ChorRorBor for the Thailand flyweight (50.8 kg) championship at BOM 36 on July 3, 2022. On June 22, it was revealed that the vacant WPMF Flyweight title would be on the line as well. Yoshinari won the fight by second round knockout with a left elbow strike.

Yoshinari faced Bandasak So Trakunpet at Super Rizin on September 25, 2022. He won the fight by a first-round technical knockout.

Yoshinari faced Chaichana Wor.WisetGym at JKA "KICK Insist 14" on November 20, 2022. He won the fight by a second-round knockout.

=== ONE Championship ===
On January 31, 2025, it was announced that Yoshinari signed with ONE Championship and he made his debut against Rak Erawan on March 23, 2025, at ONE 172. He won the fight via knockout in round three.

== Championships and accomplishments ==
=== Amateur ===
- 2012 Bigbang Amateur -28 kg Champion
- 2013 Bigbang Amateur -31 kg Champion
- 2014 All Japan SMASHERS Tournament -35 kg Winner
- 2014 Muay Thai Windy Sports -35 kg Champion
- 2014 Battle Of Muaythai (BOM) -32.5 kg Champion
- 2014 Battle Of Muaythai (BOM) -35 kg tournament winner
- 2015 MAJKF Kick Jr -37 kg Champion
- 2015 Dragon Boxing Stadium (DBS) Kids -35 kg tournament winner
- 2015 WBC Muaythai All Japan Jr League -37 kg tournament winner
- 2015 Suk Wan Kingtong Real Champion Tournament -38 kg Winner
- 2015 SMASHERS -40 kg champion

=== Professional ===
- ONE Championship
  - ONE Atomweight Muay Thai World Championship (Current, inaugural)
    - Two successful title defenses
  - 2025 ONE Championship Muay Thai Fighter of the Year
- World Muaythai Council
  - 2017 WMC World Pinweight champion
- World Boxing Council Muaythai
  - 2018 WBC Muaythai World Mini flyweight Champion
  - 2021 WBC Muaythai Nai Khanom Tom Super Bantamweight Champion
  - 2024 WBC Muaythai Diamond Super Flyweight Champion
- International Boxing Federation
  - 2018 IBF Muaythai World Mini flyweight Champion
- Rajadamnern Stadium
  - 2018 Rajadamnern Stadium Mini Flyweight (105 lbs) Champion
  - 2023 Rajadamnern Stadium Flyweight (112 lbs) Champion
    - One successful title defense
  - 2023 Interim Rajadamnern Stadium Super Flyweight (115 lbs) Champion
  - 2024 Rajadamnern Stadium Super Flyweight (115 lbs) Champion
    - Two successful title defenses
- Lumpinee Stadium
  - 2019 Lumpinee Stadium Mini Flyweight (105 lbs) Champion
- Muaythai Nai Khanom Tom Association
  - 2019 MNA Light Flyweight (108 lbs) Champion
- The Battle of Muaythai
  - 2019 BoM Flyweight (112 lbs) Champion
- Professional Boxing Association of Thailand (PAT)
  - 2022 Thailand Flyweight (112 lbs) Champion
- World Professional Muaythai Federation
  - 2022 WPMF World Flyweight (112 lbs) Champion

Awards

- eFight.jp
  - 4x Fighter of the Month (December 2018, April 2019, July 2022, February 2024)
- World Muaythai Organization
  - 2024 WMO Fighter of the Year
  - 2025 WMO Fighter of the Year

== Fight record ==
Professional Muay Thai record
72 Wins (45 (T)KO's), 6 Losses, 1 Draw
Date	Result	Opponent	Event	Location	Method	Round	Time
2026-10-17	Win	(Malaysia) Rifdean Masdor	ONE Samurai 4	Tokyo, Japan	KO (High kick)	2	0:58
Defended the ONE Atomweight Muay Thai World Championship. Rifdean missed weight (118.6 lb) and was ineligible for the title.
2026-09-12	Win	(Myanmar) Har Ling Om	ONE Samurai 3	Yokohama, Japan	Decision (unanimous)	3	5:00
2026-04-29	Win	(Thailand) Songchainoi Kiatsongrit	ONE Samurai 1	Tokyo, Japan	Decision (unanimous)	5	5:00
Defended the ONE Atomweight Muay Thai World Championship.
2025-11-16	Win	(Thailand) Numsurin Chor.Ketwina	ONE 173	Tokyo, Japan	Decision (unanimous)	5	5:00
Won the inaugural ONE Atomweight Muay Thai World Championship.
2025-08-29	Win	(Morocco) Hamada Azmani	ONE Friday Fights 122, Lumpinee Stadium	Bangkok, Thailand	TKO (leg injury)	3	0:15
2025-06-27	Win	(Thailand) Banluelok Sitwatcharachai	ONE Friday Fights 114, Lumpinee Stadium	Bangkok, Thailand	Decision (Unanimous)	3	3:00
2025-05-11	Win	(Thailand) Chokdee Phetsaengthong	BOM x Space One Japan	Tokyo, Japan	KO (Straight to the body)	1	1:59
2025-03-23	Win	(Thailand) Rak Erawan	ONE 172	Saitama, Japan	KO (Left cross)	3	2:40
2024-12-26	Win	(Thailand) Bakjo Sikunna	SHOOTBOXING GROUND ZERO TOKYO 2024	Tokyo, Japan	KO (Flying knee)	1	2:57
2024-12-01	Win	(France) Isaac Mohamed	Rajadamnern World Series Japan	Yokohama, Japan	Decision (Unanimous)	5	3:00
Defended the Rajadamnern Stadium Super Flyweight (115 lbs) title.
2024-10-13	Win	(Cambodia) Born Ponlek	BOM 49	Tokyo, Japan	TKO (3 Knockdowns)	3	2:13
2024-09-01	Win	(Thailand) Petchanuwat Nor.Anuwatgym	BOM 47	Yokohama, Japan	KO (Left cross)	2	2:42
Won the vacant WBC Muay Thai Diamond Super Flyweight (115 lbs) title.
2024-07-14	Win	(Thailand) Jomhod AutoMuayThai	Rajadamnern World Series Japan	Tokyo, Japan	Decision (Unanimous)	5	3:00
Defended the Rajadamnern Stadium Super Flyweight (115 lbs) title.
2024-04-14	Win	(Spain) Kevin Martinez	Rajadamnern World Series Japan	Chiba, Japan	Decision (Unanimous)	3	3:00
2024-02-12	Win	(Thailand) Praewprao PetchyindeeAcademy	Rajadamnern World Series Japan	Tokyo, Japan	Decision (Unanimous)	5	3:00
Won the Rajadamnern Stadium Super Flyweight (115 lbs) title.
2024-01-21	Win	(Thailand) Jaokhunthong Sor.Petchtawan	TOP BRIGHTS 1	Tokyo, Japan	KO (Left cross)	1	1:28
2023-12-23	Win	(Thailand) Chusap Sor.Salacheep	Rajadamnern World Series	Bangkok, Thailand	KO (Left cross)	2	2:10
Won the Interim Rajadamnern Stadium Super Flyweight (115 lbs) title.
2023-11-26	Win	(Thailand) Rungsaknoi Sitniwat	JKA "KICK Insist 17"	Tokyo, Japan	KO (High kick)	2	0:21
2023-10-01	Win	(Thailand) Chondaen Sitdaman	BOM 44	Yokosuka, Japan	TKO (Left middle kick)	1	0:48
2023-09-09	Win	(Laos) Soulixay Singsavath	Rajadamnern World Series	Bangkok, Thailand	KO (Elbow)	1	1:25
2023-08-12	Win	(Thailand) Rungwittaya Lookchaomaesaitong	Rajadamnern World Series	Bangkok, Thailand	TKO (Referee stoppage)	4	2:15
Defended the Rajadamnern Stadium Flyweight (112 lbs) title.
2023-07-09	Win	(Thailand) Waewwaw Wor.Klinpathum	BOM 41	Tokyo, Japan	Decision (Unanimous)	5	3:00
Won the Rajadamnern Stadium Flyweight (112 lbs) title.
2023-05-14	Win	(Thailand) Phetnakorn Sor.Pettawan	HOOST CUP - Kickboxing World Cup in Japan	Tokyo, Japan	KO (Knee to the body)	1	2:35
2023-04-09	Win	(Thailand) Songchainoi Kiatsongrit	BOM Ouroboros 2023	Tokyo, Japan	TKO (3 knockdowns)	3	1:47
2023-02-25	Win	(Thailand) Patakhin SinbiMuayThai	RWS + Palangmai, Rajadamnern Stadium	Bangkok, Thailand	KO (High kick)	3	2:02
2022-12-11	Win	(Japan) Kuryu	BOM 37	Yokohama, Japan	Decision (Unanimous)	5	3:00
2022-11-20	Win	(Thailand) Chaichana Wor.WisetGym	JKA "KICK Insist 14"	Tokyo, Japan	KO (Left hook to the body)	2	0:46
2022-09-25	Win	(Thailand) Bandasak Sor.Trakunpet	Super Rizin	Saitama, Japan	TKO (Ref stop./Knee to the body)	1	2:24
2022-07-03	Win	(Thailand) Phetnipon Sak.ChorRorBor	BOM 36	Yokohama, Japan	KO (Left elbow)	2	2:22
Won the Thailand and vacant WPMF World Flyweight (112 lbs) titles.
2022-04-24	Win	(Japan) Keito Naito	BOM WAVE 08	Beppu, Japan	TKO (Corner stoppage)	2	2:34
2022-03-06	Win	(Japan) Yusei Shirahata	Rizin Landmark 2	Tokyo, Japan	KO (Left cross)	2	1:02
2021-12-05	Win	(Thailand) Khun NamIsan Shobukai	BOM WAVE 07 The 1st – Get Over The COVID-19 –	Tokyo, Japan	Decision (Unanimous)	5	3:00
Won WBC Muay Thai Super Bantamweight Nai Khanom Tom Challenge belt.
2021-10-24	Win	(Japan) Naoki Ishikawa	Rizin 31 - Yokohama	Yokohama, Japan	TKO (3 knockdowns)	1	2:30
2021-09-26	Win	(Japan) Hitoshi Sato	The Battle of MuayThai – Ouroboros 2021 –	Tokyo, Japan	KO (Knee to the Body)	1	1:23
2021-06-27	Win	(Japan) Chikai	Rizin 29 – Osaka	Osaka, Japan	TKO (Doctor stoppage)	1	3:00
2021-04-11	Win	(Japan) Ibuki Bravely	BOM WAVE 04 pt.1 ~ Get Over The COVID-19 ~	Yokohama, Japan	KO (Left elbow)	1	2:24
2020-12-31	Win	(Thailand) Phetmalai Phetjaroenvit	Rizin 26	Saitama, Japan	KO (3 Knockdowns)	1	2:19
2020-10-04	Win	(Japan) Hidetora Abe	BOM WAVE 02 ~ Get Over The COVID-19 ~	Yokohama, Japan	KO (Elbow)	2	2:39
2020-08-09	Win	(Japan) Yuushin	Rizin 22 – Yokohama	Yokohama, Japan	TKO (Knees + elbows)	2	3:08
2020-06-28	Win	(Japan) Takuto Wor.Wanchai	BOM WAVE 01 ~ Get Over The COVID-19 ~	Tokyo, Japan	Decision (Unanimous)	5	3:00
2019-12-08	Win	(Hong Kong) Chi Yeung Fung	The Battle Of Muaythai BOM2-6 Part II, Flyweight Tournament Final	Tokyo, Japan	KO (Left high kick)	1	2:45
Won the inaugural Battle of Muay Thai Flyweight (112 lbs) title.
2019-12-08	Win	(Korea) Lee Ji Sung	The Battle Of Muaythai BOM2-6 Part II, Flyweight Tournament Semi Final	Tokyo, Japan	KO (Liver kick)	1	1:36
2019-10-31	Win	(Thailand) Ekmuangkhon Mor.KrungthepThonburi	Rajadamnern Stadium "Chujaroen Muay Thai" (114 lbs bout)	Bangkok, Thailand	Decision	5	3:00
2019-09-10	Draw	(Thailand) Isantai Sitchefboontham	Siriluckmuaythai + Ud Udon + Bes Chiang Mai, Lumpinee Stadium	Bangkok, Thailand	Decision	5	3:00
For the WMC World Light Flyweight title and a side-bet of 400,000 baht.
2019-07-18	Loss	(Thailand) Isantai Sitchefboontham	Sidchefboontham, Rajadamnern Stadium	Bangkok, Thailand	Decision	5	3:00
For the IBF Muay Thai World Light Flyweight (108 lbs) title.
2019-06-01	Win	(Thailand) Kengkla Numponthep	"BOM2-2 - The Battle Of Muay Thai Season II vol.2 -"	Yokohama, Japan	Decision (unanimous)	5	3:00
Won the vacant Muay Thai Naikhanomtom Association (MNA) Light Flyweight title.
2019-04-14	Win	(Thailand) Singdam Kafaefocus	The Battle Of Muaythai SEASON 2 vol.1	Yokohama, Japan	Decision (unanimous)	5	3:00
Won the vacant Lumpinee Stadium Mini flyweight (105lbs/47.63kg) title.
2019-02-24	Win	(Thailand) Bigone Sor.Sirilux	Saenchai Muaythai Gym "MuayThaiOpen 44"	Tokyo, Japan	KO (left body hook)	1	2:29
Won the vacant Lumpinee Stadium of Japan (LPNJ) Mini flyweight (105 lbs) title.
2019-02-07	Win	(Thailand) Bakjo Auddonmuang	Rajadamnern Stadium "Muaythai Rajadamnern+Chefboonthum" (106 lbs)	Bangkok, Thailand	TKO (left cross)	3	
2018-12-09	Win	(Thailand) Hercules Phetsimean	"BOM XX The Battle Of Muay Thai 20"	Yokohama, Japan	Decision (unanimous)	5	3:00
Won the Rajadamnern Stadium Mini Flyweight (105 lbs) title.
2018-09-26	Win	(Thailand) Roma Uddonmuang	Rajadamnern Stadium "Chefboonthum"	Bangkok, Thailand	TKO (ref. stop./Left body cross)	1	
Won the vacant IBF Muaythai World Mini flyweight (105lbs/47.63kg) title.
2018-07-01	Win	(Thailand) Bikwan Rasanon	"BOM XVIII The Battle Of Muay Thai 18" (WMC Mini flyweight)	Yokohama, Japan	KO (Left bodyshot)	2	2:29
2018-06-18	Win	(Thailand) Jong Or.Chefboonthum	Omnoi Stadium "TV match" (105 lbs)	Samut Sakhon, Thailand	Decision (unanimous)	5	3:00
2018-05-16	Loss	(Thailand) Phetmorakot Aooddonmuang	Rajadamnern Stadium "Chujaroen Muaythai" (105 lbs)	Bangkok, Thailand	Decision	5	3:00
2018-04-08	Win	(Thailand) Tuantong Singmanee	"BOM XVII The Battle Of Muay Thai 17"	Koto, Tokyo, Japan	Decision (unanimous)	5	3:00
Won the vacant WBC Muaythai world Mini-flyweight (105lbs/47.63kg) title. The scoring was 50-45/49-46/50-44.
2018-02-19	Win	(Thailand) Mong Sitpanumtong	Rajadamnern Stadium "Suek Chefboonthum" (104 lbs)	Bangkok, Thailand	KO (Left body cross)	4	
2017-12-20	Win	(Thailand) Jomwo Aooddonmuang	Rajadamnern Stadium "Suek Chefboonthum" (46.5 kg)	Bangkok, Thailand	KO (Left cross)	2	
2017-10-21	Win	(Thailand) Segai Latanon	Coral Z "Inoki Ism.2 - Inoki Living Funeral -"	Sumida, Tokyo, Japan	Decision (unanimous)	3	3:00
2017-08-24	Win	(Thailand) Phetjing Lukbanyai	Rajadamnern Stadium "Suek Chefboonthum" (45 kg)	Bangkok, Thailand	Decision	5	3:00
2017-07-17	Win	(Thailand) Rifle Sor.Saksiam	Rajadamnern Stadium "Chefboonthum Fight" (45 kg)	Bangkok, Thailand	TKO	5	1:00
2017-04-09	Win	(Thailand) Yaksaed Siriluck Muaythai	"BOM XIV The Battle Of Muay Thai 14"	Tokyo, Japan	KO (Left elbow)	3	1:52
Won the vacant WMC World Pinweight (100lbs/45.45kg) title.
2017-03-09	Win	(Thailand) Bigborn Sojoytoypelyu	Rajadamnern Stadium	Bangkok, Thailand	KO	3	
2017-01-26	Win	(Thailand) Petchbunchoon Talinga Muaythai	Rajadamnern Stadium	Bangkok, Thailand	Decision	5	
2016-12-25	Win	(Thailand) Srinakhon Lukmamped	WORLD-CLASS MUAYTHAI	Japan	Decision	3	
2016-12-04	Win	(Japan) Yū Hiramatsu	"BOM XIII The Battle Of Muay Thai 13" (100 lbs bout.))	Yokohama, Japan	KO	3	2:52
2016-11-13	Loss	(Thailand) Chusap Tor Ittipon	Shomukai "Muay Lok 2016 4th"	Tokyo, Japan	Decision (unanimous)	5	3:00
For the WMC world Pinweight (100lbs/45.45kg) title. The scoring was 50-47/50-47/50-47.
2016-09-30	Win	(Thailand) Chaiyai Chor.Sanpeenong	Max Muay Thai Stadium "MUAY THAI WORLD BATTLE" (43 kg.)	Pattaya, Chonburi, Thailand	KO (Left knee body shot)	1	
2016-09-22	Win	(Thailand) Ekarin Sor.Jor.Toypadriw	Rajadamnern Stadium "Suek Jarumuang + Sor.Sommai" (93 lbs.)	Bangkok, Thailand	KO	4	?
2016-09-04	Win	(Thailand) Dennongpok Phodaogym	Shomukai "Muay Lok 2016 3rd" (43 kg.)	Tokyo, Japan	KO (Left knee shot)	2	2:57
2016-08-13	Win	(Thailand) Deckdoi Sit Sawadakeo	Rangsit Stadium (44 kg non-title bout.)	Pathum Thani Province, Thailand	TKO (corner stoppage)	2	3:00
2016-08-10	Win	(Thailand) Noknoi Sor Reunrom	Asiatique: Muay Thai Live (46 kg non-title bout)	Bangkok, Thailand	Decision (unanimous)	3	3:00
2016-07-03	Loss	(Thailand) Kaen Esan Sit Eakubom	"BOM 12 -The Battle Of Muay Thai 12-" (44 kg)	Kōtō, Tokyo, Japan	Decision (unanimous)	5	3:00
2016-05-06	Loss	(Thailand) Maheswan		Buriram Province, Thailand	Decision	5	3:00
For the Isan Area (North-East Thailand) 42kg title.
2016-04-03	Win	(Japan) Riichi Hoshino	"BOM 11 -The Battle Of Muay Thai 11-" (45 kg)	Tokyo, Japan	Decision (majority)	3	3:00
2016-03-10	Win	(Thailand) Sergit Sor.Malaitong	Rajadamnern Stadium "Jarumuang Fight" (90 lbs.)	Bangkok, Thailand	Decision (unanimous)	5	2:00
2016-01-08	Win	(China) Shaochu Youran	Worldwide MMA Alliance Championship Opening match (40 kg)	Kōtō, Tokyo, Japan	Decision	3	3:00
2015-11-29	Win	(Thailand) Oley Phor.Homklin	Rajadamnern Stadium "Chujaroenmuaythai Fight" (38 kg bout)	Bangkok, Thailand	KO	2	
2015-08-15	Loss	(Thailand) Sudlo Phetbanpa	Lumpinee Stadium "Krirkkrai"	Bangkok, Thailand	Decision	5	2:00
2015-06-20	Win	(Thailand) Phansaeng Sakwarun	Lumpinee Stadium "Krirkkrai"	Bangkok, Thailand	Decision	5	2:00
Legend: Win Loss Draw/No contest Notes

=== Amateur record ===
Amateur Kickboxing record (incomplete)
about 80 Wins, 13 Losses several Draws
Date	Result	Opponent	Event	Location	Method	Round	Time
2015-12-20	Win	(Japan) Yuuga Kurosawa	Suk Wan Kingthong, Real Champion Tournament 38 kg Final	Tokyo, Japan	Decision		
2015-12-20	Win	(Japan) Ruku Kondo	Suk Wan Kingthong, Real Champion Tournament 38 kg Semi Final	Tokyo, Japan	KO	1	
2015-12-12	Win	(Japan) Hidenojō Shimizu	JAKF "SMASHERS Champion's Carnival 2015"	Kōtō, Tokyo, Japan	Decision (unanimous)	2	1:30
Wins the vacant title of SMASHERS 40kg class championship.
2015-12-06	Win	(Japan) Hyūga Satō	BOM promotion "BOM 10 -The Battle Of Muay Thai 10-" (37 kg class non-title match)	Yokohama, Japan	Decision (unanimous)	5	2:00
2015-08-30	Win	(Japan) Shunpei Kitano	1st WBC Muay Thai Junior League U-15 National Championship, Final	Kōtō, Tokyo, Japan			
Wins Junior high school students category, -37kg class tournament.
2015-08-30	Win	(Japan) Shō Iwao	1st WBC Muay Thai Junior League U-15 National Championship, Semi-final	Kōtō, Tokyo, Japan			
2015-08-02	Win	(Japan) Ryusei Kumagai	MTSF "Amateur Competition Suk Wan Kingthong", Final	Ōta, Tokyo, Japan	TKO (referee stoppage)	2	0:39
Wins the Muay Thai Super Fight Suk Wan Kingthong -38kg class Real Champion Tournament.
2015-08-02	Win	(Japan) Aito Sakurai	MTSF "Amateur Competition Suk Wan Kingthong", Semi-final	Ōta, Tokyo, Japan	KO (Referee stop/body shot)	1	1:30
2015-07-26	Win	(Japan) Shōta Noda	Dragon Gym "A-League 31 Deluxe", Final	Sendai, Miyagi, Japan	KO	2	1:05
Wins Dragon Boxing Stadium (DBS) Kids 35kg class tournament, and also wins Special Award.
2015-07-26	Win	(Japan) Shūto Eba	Dragon Gym "A-League 31 Deluxe", Semi-final	Sendai, Miyagi, Japan	KO	1	0:18
2015-06-15	Win	(Japan) Konomu Sugita	174th JAKF authorization SMASHERS -40 kg class match.	Ōta, Tokyo, Japan	Decision (unanimous)		
2015-04-29	Win	(Japan) Kippei Niina	"-The Battle Of Muay Thai 8-"	Yokohama, Japan	Decision (unanimous)	5	2:00
2015-03-29	Win	(Japan) Yushin Noguchi	MuayThaiPhoon vol.1	Nagoya, Japan	Decision (Unanimous)	2	2:00
2015-03-08	Win	(Japan) Ryuya Okuwaki	MA Nihon Kick TRADITION 2～STAIRWAY TO DREAM	Tokyo, Japan	Decision	3	2:00
Wins MA Kick Jr -37kg title.
2014-12-21	Win	(Japan) Kippei Niina	WINDY SPORTS	Tokyo, Japan	Decision	5	
Wins inaugural WINDY SPORTS -35kg title.
2014-12-14	Win	(Japan) Shōgo Komiyama	8th BOM Amateur Competition	Yokohama, Japan		2	2:00
2014-12-13	Win	(Japan) Taiga Hori	JAKF SMASHERS Tournament, Final	Tokyo, Japan	Decision		
2014-12-13	Win	(Japan)	JAKF SMASHERS Tournament, Semi Final	Tokyo, Japan	Decision		
2014-10-19	Win	(Japan) Asahi Shinagawa	WPMF BOM Amateur competition, Final	Yokohama, Japan		2	2:00
Wins BOM Junior tournament.
2014-10-19	Win	(Japan) Chihiro Sugiyama	WPMF BOM Amateur competition, Semi-final	Yokohama, Japan		2	2:00
2014-10-19	Win	(Japan) Shōgo Nakajima	WPMF BOM Amateur competition, Quarter-final	Yokohama, Japan		2	2:00
2014-10-13	Win	(Japan) Shiyū Aoyama	Muaythai WINDY Super Fight vol.18 in Kyoto	Kameoka, Kyoto, Japan	KO	2	
2014-08-17	Win	(Japan) Kippei Niina	MUAYTHAI WINDY SUPER FIGHT vol.17	Tokyo, Japan	Decision (Unanimous)	3	2:00
2014-06-29	Win	(Japan) Ryuya Okuwaki	Muay Thai WINDY Super Fight vol.16, Final	Tokyo, Japan	Decision (Unanimous)	5	1:00
Wins Windy Super Fight -35kg title.
2014-06-29	Win	(Japan) Kojiro Vonhoose	Muay Thai WINDY Super Fight vol.16, Semi Final	Tokyo, Japan	KO	1	
2014-06-29	Win	(Japan) Issei Koizumi	Muay Thai WINDY Super Fight vol.16, Quarter Final	Tokyo, Japan			
2014-06-29	Win	(Japan) Yuto Ideguchi	Muay Thai WINDY Super Fight vol.16, First Round	Tokyo, Japan			
2014-05-06	Win	(Japan) Reito Komiyama	BOM Amateur 6	Tokyo, Japan	Decision	3	2:00
Wins Battle of Muaythai (BOM) -32.5kg title.
2014-04-13	Win	(Japan) Asahi Shinagawa	BOM Amateur 5	Yokohama, Japan	Decision		
2014-03-23	Win	(Japan) Arashi Kajiwara	HoostCup Legend -Densetsu Kourin-	Nagoya, Aichi, Japan	Decision (unanimous)	3	2:00
2014-01-19	Win	(Japan) Michiharu Nara	4th BOM Amateur Competition, Final	Yokohama, Japan		2	2:00
Wins Battle of Muaythai (BOM) -35kg class tournament.
2014-01-19	Win	(Japan) Shota Okudaira	4th BOM Amateur Competition, Semi-final	Yokohama, Japan		2	2:00
2014-01-19	Win	(Japan) Haruki Ohno	4th BOM Amateur Competition, Quarter-final	Yokohama, Japan		2	2:00
2013-12-01	Win	(Japan) Asahi Shinagawa	3rd BOM Amateur Competition, Final	Yokohama, Kanagawa, Japan		2	2:00
Wins Battle of Muaythai (BOM) -32.5kg class tournament.
2013-12-01	Win	(Japan) Hyuga Umemoto	3rd BOM Amateur Competition, Semi-final	Yokohama, Japan		2	2:00
2013	Draw	(Japan) Toki Tamaru	TNT Amateur YZD Gym	Tokyo, Japan	Decision	2	2:00
2013-09-08	Loss	(Japan) Shōgo Nakajima	2nd BOM Amateur Competition, Quarter-final	Yokohama, Japan		2	2:00
2013-08-12	Win	(Thailand)	Queen's Birthday	Bangkok, Thailand	Decision	5	2:00
2013-07-14	Win	(Japan) Jukiya Itō	15th Bigban Amateur Kickboxing Competition	Ōta, Tokyo, Japan		3	2:00
Retains his title of Bigbang Junior -31kg class championship.
2013-04-14	Draw	(Japan) Ryū Kanno	BOM promotion "BOM 1 -The Battle Of Muay Thai 1- Part.1"	Yokohama, Japan	Decision (Split)	2	2:00
2013-03-10	Win	(Japan) Tōma Sugihara	Bigbang the future VI		Decision	3	2:00
Wins the vacant title of Bigbang Junior -31kg class championship.
2012-12-23	Win	(Japan) Kento Itō	1st Japan Amateur Muaythai Championship and 2013 WMF Qualification tournament, Final	Kōtō, Tokyo, Japan			
Wins -28kg class tournament.
2012-11-11	Win	(Japan) Ikkō Ōta	Jawin presents Bigbang the future V	Ōta, Tokyo, Japan			
Wins 1st vacant title of Bigbang Junior -28kg class championship.
2012-08-05	Win	(Japan) Ikkō Ōta	Muay Yoko 19 – 29 kg non-title bout	Yokohama, Japan	Decision (Majority)	2	1:30
2012-06-24	Loss	(Japan) Ryuya Okuwaki	Muay Yoko 18 – 29 kg non-title bout	Ōta, Tokyo, Japan	Decision (Unanimous)	Ex1	1:30
2012-06-24	Win	(Japan) Tokimitsu Fujita	Muay Yoko 18 – 29 kg non-title bout	Ōta, Tokyo, Japan	Decision (Majority)	2	1:30
2012-04-15	Win	(Japan) Nene Machiya	5th Bigbang Amateur Competition	Ōta, Tokyo, Japan	KO		
2012-03-25	Win	(Japan) Hibiki Arai	APKF Amateur Kickboxing Competition	Ōta, Tokyo, Japan	Decision	2	1:30
2011-08-07	Loss	(Japan) Ryuya Okuwaki	Muay Yoko 16 -	Yokohama, Japan	Decision (unanimous)	Ex.1	1:30
2011-06-05	Win	(Japan) Sera Sugihara	Muay Yoko 15, Kids 26 kg class tournament Quarter-final	Ōta, Tokyo, Japan	TKO	1	1:30
Yoshinari could not take part in the semi-final match because he felt under the weather. Okuwaki advanced to the final of Kids 26kg class tournament without fighting.
2010-08-08	Win	(Japan) Taiyō Satō	Muay Yoko 13 - 22–24 kg class non-title bout	Yokohama, Japan	Decision (majority)	2	1:30
2010-04-25	Win	(Japan) Hyūga Umemoto	Muay Yoko 12 - 0–22 kg class non-title bout	Yokohama, Japan	Decision (unanimous)	2	1:30
Legend: Win Loss Draw/No contest Notes

== See also ==
- List of male kickboxers
- List of IBF Muaythai world champions
- List of WBC Muaythai world champions

Awards and achievements
New championship	1st IBF Muaythai World Mini flyweight Champion; September 26, 2018 – Present	Vacant Title next held by Incumbent
Vacant Title last held by Nichaoew Suwitgym	3rd WBC Muaythai World Mini flyweight Champion; April 8, 2018 – ? (Returned)	Vacant Title next held by Incumbent
Vacant Title last held by Shushap Tor Ittiporn	WMC World Pinweight Champion; April 9, 2017 – ? (Returned)	Succeeded by Ryūya Okuwaki
New championship	1st LPNJ Mini flyweight Champion; February 24, 2019 – Present	Vacant Title next held by Incumbent
Preceded by Hercules Phetsimean	Rajadamnern Boxing Stadium Mini flyweight Champion; December 9, 2018 – Present	Incumbent
Vacant Title last held by Hercules Phetsimean	Lumpinee Boxing Stadium Mini flyweight Champion; April 14, 2019 – Present	Incumbent
