= Ryuya Okuwaki =

Japanese Muay Thai fighter

- Born: August 26, 2000 (age 26); Yokohama, Japan
- Native name: 奥脇 竜哉
- Other names: Ryuya Eiwasportsgym (เรียวยะ เอวะสปอร์ตยิม); Ryuya Hamakkonumponthep
- Height: 1.63 m (5 ft 4 in)
- Weight: 51 kg (112 lb; 8.0 st)
- Division: Mini flyweight
- Style: Muay Thai,
- Stance: Orthodox
- Fighting out of: Yokohama, Japan
- Team: Eiwa Sports Gym
- Years active: 2016 - present

Kickboxing record
- Total: 53
- Wins: 42
- By knockout: 20
- Losses: 9
- By knockout: 0
- Draws: 2

Ryuya Okuwaki (born 26 August 2000), also known as Ryuya Eiwasportsgym in Thailand, is a Japanese Muay Thai fighter. He is the former Rajadamnern, WPMF and IBF Muaythai World mini flyweight champion.

He is the former WMC World Pinweight champion.

== Career ==
Okuwaki made his professional debut against Hanuman Sor. Walitar in June 2016, winning the fight by unanimous decision. He would win four of his next six fights, with his 7-2 record earning him a chance to fight Newjorwan Pumpanmuang for the WMC World Pinweight title. Okuwaki defeated Newjorwan by unanimous decision.

Okuwaki lost his next fight against Phetdeet Wor. Sanprapai by decision, but would rebounded with a two fight win streak. In April 2019, he fought a rematch with Newjorwan Pumpanmuang, for the Muay Siam Isan 105 lbs title. Okuwaki once again defeated Newjorwan, this time with a second round head kick knockout. Two months later, Okuwaki fought Petchdet Wor.Sangprapai for the vacant WBC Muaythai World 105 lbs title, losing the fight by unanimous decision.

In September 2019, Okuwaki was scheduled to fight Mungkornyok AnnyMuayThai for the Rajadamnern Stadium 105 lbs title. He defeated Mungkornyok by unanimous decision.

Okuwaki fought Phetsila MTM Academy for the WPMF World Mini Flyweight title at BOM 2-6. He lost the fight by majority decision. He was once again scheduled to fight for the fight same title two months later, against Udonnoi Bestbet 9955. Okuwaki won the fight by a fourth round knockout.

On July 28, 2021 Okuwaki faced Riku Kazushima at RISE 151. The fight was declared a majority draw despite Kazushima scoring a knockdown in the first round. The fight did not go to an extension round as Kazushima accepted the bout on short notice.

Okuwaki faced Ryuto Oinuma at Rizin 31 - Yokohama on October 24, 2021. He won the bout via majority decision.

Okuwaki challenged Jigsaw NayoksoywiangyongLamphun for his Rajadamnern Stadium Flyweight title on February 15, 2025, on a Rajadamnern World Series event. He lost the fight by unanimous decision.

Okuwaki fought Thanupit on April 20, 2025. He won in the 2nd round via Technical Knockout.

On October 5, 2025 Okuwaki defended his belt against Waewwaow Wor.Wangprom. He won after 5 rounds via unanimous decision.

== Championships and accomplishments ==
=== Amateur ===
- 2015 Suk Wan Kingtong Real Champion Tournament -42 kg Winner
- 2015 WBC Muay Thai Jr. League All Japan -40 kg Champion
- 2015 SMASHERS -40 kg Champion
- 2015 Bigbang Amateur -37 kg
- 2014 All Japan SMASHERS Tournament -40 kg Winner
- 2014 MA Kick Jr -32 kg Champion
- 2013 NJKF Junior Kick -30 kg
- 2012 MA Kick Jr -28 kg Champion
- 2011 MA Kick Jr -25 kg Champion
- 2010 NJKF Junior Kick -25 kg Champion

=== Professional ===
- World Boxing Council Muay Thai
  - 2024 WBC Muay Thai World Flyweight (112 lbs) Champion
    - Two successful title defenses
- Professional Boxing Association of Thailand (PAT)
  - 2023 Thailand 112 lbs Champion
- World Professional Muaythai Federation
  - 2020 WPMF World Mini Flyweight Champion
- Rajadamnern Stadium
  - 2019 Rajadamnern Stadium 105 lbs Champion
- International Boxing Federation
  - 2019 IBF Muay Thai Mini-Flyweight World Champion
- Muay Siam
  - 2019 Muay Siam Isan 105 lbs Champion
- World Muay Thai Organization
  - 2018 WMO World Light Flyweight Champion
- World Muay Thai Council
  - 2018 WMC World Pinweight Champion

Awards

- eFight.jp
  - Fighter of the Month (September 2019)

== Fight record ==
Professional Muay Thai & Kickboxing record
42 Wins (20 (T)KO's), 7 Losses, 2 Draws
Date	Result	Opponent	Event	Location	Method	Round	Time
2026-12-02		(Thailand) Thongpoon P.K.Saenchai	ONE Samurai 6	Yokohama, Japan			
2026-09-12	Win	(Thailand) Chokdee Maxjandee	ONE Samurai 3	Tokyo, Japan	KO (Left hook to the body)	2	1:29
2026-06-26	Win	(Thailand) Hern N.F.Looksuan	ONE Friday Fights 160, Lumpinee Stadium	Bangkok, Thailand	TKO (Body punches)	2	1:14
2026-04-05	Win	(Thailand) Detchpichai Navyandaman	BOM 50	Yokohama, Japan	Decision (Split)	5	3:00
Defends the WBC Muay Thai World Flyweight (112 lbs) title.
2025-12-19	Win	(Thailand) Pet Suanluangrodyok	ONE Friday Fights 137, Lumpinee Stadium	Bangkok, Thailand	Decision (Unanimous)	3	3:00
2025-10-05	Win	(Thailand) Waewwaow Wor.Wangprom	BOM OUROBOROS 2025	Yokosuka, Japan	Decision (Unanimous)	5	3:00
Defends the WBC Muay Thai World Flyweight (112 lbs) title.
2025-08-22	Win	(Thailand) Nuaphet Kelasport	ONE Friday Fights 121, Lumpinee Stadium	Bangkok, Thailand	KO (High kick)	2	2:22
2025-06-15	Win	(Thailand) Huakaewhuawaen JackyGym	Road to RWS Japan	Tokyo, Japan	KO (Punches)	2	1:40
2025-05-11	Win	(Thailand) Kaenubon Por.Lakboon	BOM x Space One Japan	Tokyo, Japan	Decision (Unanimous)	3	3:00
2025-04-20	Win	(Thailand) Thanupit SiriluckMuaythai	Road to Rajadamnern	Tokyo, Japan	KO (Left hook to the body)	2	2:46
2025-02-15	Loss	(Thailand) Jigsaw NayoksoywiangyongLamphun	Rajadamnern World Series	Bangkok, Thailand	Decision (Unanimous)	5	3:00
For the Rajadamnern Stadium Flyweight (112 lbs) title.
2024-12-01	Win	(Thailand) Kampanthong Chor.Hapayak	Rajadamnern World Series Japan	Yokohama, Japan	Decision (Unanimous)	3	3:00
2024-10-13	Win	(Cambodia) Proeung Sochet	BOM 49	Tokyo, Japan	TKO (3 Knockdowns)	1	1:36
2024-09-04	Win	(Thailand) Sivarat Wor.Rinthida	BOM 47	Yokohama, Japan	KO (Punches)	1	2:44
Wins the vacant WBC Muay Thai World Flyweight (112 lbs) title.
2024-07-14	Win	(Thailand) Kaewnaka OrBorJor.NakhonPhanom	Rajadamnern World Series Japan	Chiba, Japan	Decision (Unanimous)	3	3:00
2024-06-22	Win	(Thailand) Klaijaenglek Sit Klaijaeng	Rajadamnern World Series	Bangkok, Thailand	KO (Left hook to the body)	1	2:25
2024-04-14	Win	(Thailand) Kotchasit Tasayasat	Rajadamnern World Series Japan	Chiba, Japan	Decision (Unanimous)	3	3:00
2024-03-02	Loss	(Thailand) Kotchasit Tasayasat	Rajadamnern World Series	Bangkok, Thailand	Decision (Unanimous)	3	3:00
2023-12-23	Win	(Iran) Peyman Zofaghari	Rajadamnern World Series	Bangkok, Thailand	TKO (Referee stoppage)	3	2:43
2023-10-28	Loss	(Thailand) Detchpichai NavyAndaman	Rajadamnern World Series	Bangkok, Thailand	Decision (Unanimous)	3	3:00
2023-08-14	Win	(Thailand) Superchamp WoodyChonburiPraleasing	Muay Thai Pantamit, Thupatemi Stadium	Pathum Thani, Thailand	Decision (Unanimous)	5	3:00
Wins the vacant Thailand Flyweight (112 lbs) title.
2023-07-09	Draw	(Thailand) Harn Sor.Sakarin	BOM 41	Tokyo, Japan	Decision (Split)	5	3:00
2023-06-21	Win	(Malaysia) Rifdean ChaoraiOy	Muay Thai Palangmai, Rajadamnern Stadium	Bangkok, Thailand	TKO (Knees)	2	
2023-04-09	Win	(Thailand) Sunday UFA Boomdeksien	BOM Ouroboros 2023	Tokyo, Japan	KO (Left hook to the body)	3	2:39
2022-12-11	Win	Newang KofightThailand	BOM 37	Yokohama, Japan	KO (Low kicks)	1	0:42
2021-12-12	Win	(Japan) Yuzuki Sakai	RISE 153	Tokyo, Japan	Decision (Unanimous)	3	3:00
2021-11-14	Win	(Japan) Koichi Sakamoto	Super Bigbang 2021	Yokohama, Japan	KO (Flying Knee)	1	2:14
2021-10-24	Win	(Japan) Ryuto Oinuma	Rizin 31 - Yokohama	Yokohama, Japan	Decision (Majority)	3	3:00
2021-09-26	Win	(Japan) Tomo	BOM – ouroboros 2021 –	Tokyo, Japan	Decision (Unanimous)	3	3:00
2021-07-28	Draw	(Japan) Riku Kazushima	RISE 151	Tokyo, Japan	Decision (Majority)	3	3:00
2021-04-11	Win	(Japan) Masa Bravely	BOM WAVE 04 – Get Over The COVID-19	Yokohama, Japan	Decision (Unanimous)	5	3:00
2021-02-28	Win	(Japan) Shinichi Watanabe	RISE Eldorado 2021	Yokohama, Japan	Decision (Unanimous)	3	3:00
2020-12-06	Win	(Japan) Hidetora Abe	The Battle Of Muay Thai WAVE 03 - Get over the COVID-19	Yokohama, Japan	TKO	1	1:40
2020-10-04	Win	(Japan) Ryunosuke Wor.Wanchai	The Battle Of Muay Thai Wave 02 Get over the COVID-19	Yokohama, Japan	Decision (Unanimous)	5	3:00
2020-02-09	Win	(Thailand) Udonnoi Bestbet 9955	The Battle Of Muay Thai SEASON II vol.7	Tokyo, Japan	KO (Right Hook)	4	0:57
Wins the vacant WPMF World Mini Flyweight (105 lbs) title
2019-12-08	Loss	(Thailand) Petchsila MTM Academy	BOM 2-6～THE Battle Of Muaythai SEASON II vol.6	Tokyo, Japan	Decision (Majority)	5	3:00
For the vacant WPMF World Mini Flyweight (105 lbs) title.
2019-10-31	Win	(Thailand) Sangarthit Sitchefboontham	Chujaroen Muay Thai, Rajadamnern Stadium	Bangkok, Thailand	Decision	5	3:00
2019-09-09	Win	(Thailand) Mungkornyok AnnyMuayThai	Chujaroen Muay Thai, Rajadamnern Stadium	Bangkok, Thailand	Decision (Unanimous)	5	3:00
Wins the vacant Rajadamnern Stadium 105 lbs title.
2019-07-18	Win	(Thailand) Boonlai Sidchefboontham	Chef Boontham, Rajadamnern Stadium	Bangkok, Thailand	Decision	5	3:00
Wins the vacant IBF Muay Thai World 105 lbs title.
2019-06-01	Loss	(Thailand) Petchdet Wor.Sangprapai	BOM -The Battle Of Muay Thai- season II vol.2	Yokohama, Japan	Decision (Unanimous)	5	3:00
For the vacant WBC Muay Thai World 105 lbs title
2019-04-14	Win	(Thailand) Newjorwan Pumpanmuang	BOM2-1 - The Battle Of Muay Thai Season II vol.1 -	Yokohama, Japan	KO (Left High Kick)	2	1:45
Wins the Muay Siam Isan 105 lbs title.
2019-03-16	Win	(Thailand) Yodchingchai TalingngamMuaythai	Suek Jao Muay Thai, Siam Omnoi Stadium	Samut Sakhon, Thailand	Decision (Unanimous)	5	3:00
2019-02-07	Loss	(Thailand) Kaotam Sitchefboontham	Chef Boontham, Rajadamnern Stadium	Bangkok, Thailand	Decision	5	3:00
2018-12-09	Win	(Thailand) Joker Phetsimean	The Battle Of Muaythai 20	Yokohama, Japan	Decision (Unanimous)	5	3:00
2018-08-29	Loss	(Thailand) Petchdet Wor.Sangprapai	Suk Wan Kinthong Muay Thai Super Fight	Tokyo, Japan	Decision	5	3:00
2018-05-30	Win	(Thailand) Petchsiri Chomkaw Gym	MBK Fight Night	Bangkok, Thailand	KO (Punch)	2	1:33
Wins WMO World Light Flyweight title.
2018-04-08	Win	(Thailand) Newjorwan Pumpanmuang	Battle Of Muaythai 17	Yokohama, Japan	Decision (Unanimous)	5	3:00
Wins WMC World Pinweight title.
2017-11-29	Win	(Thailand) Chalamkaw Sunkilathasao	Petchyindee, Rajadamnern Stadium	Bangkok, Thailand	Decision	5	3:00
2017-08-28	Loss	(Thailand) Chokpreecha Fukenoodle	Petchyindee, Rajadamnern Stadium	Bangkok, Thailand	Decision	5	3:00
2017-07-26	Win	(Thailand) Chokpreecha Fukenoodle	Petchyindee, Rajadamnern Stadium	Bangkok, Thailand	Decision	5	3:00
2017-05-14	Win	(Thailand) Maimongkon Phutiananbangna	Petchyindee, Rajadamnern Stadium	Bangkok, Thailand	KO	3	
2017-01-22	Win	(Thailand) Nawee Aor.Electric	Rajadamnern Stadium	Bangkok, Thailand	Decision	5	3:00
2016-10-09	Loss	(Thailand) Sonlam 13LianResort	Suk Wanchai MuayThai Super Fight	Tokyo, Japan	Decision (Unanimous)	3	3:00
2016-06-19	Win	(Thailand) Hanuman Sor. Walitar	Wanchai+Kingthong MuayThai Super Fight	Tokyo, Japan	Decision (Unanimous)	3	3:00
2016-04-16	Loss	(Thailand) Phetsuthat Paesaisee	Suek Jao Muaythai, Siam Omnoi Stadium	Samut Sakhon, Thailand	Decision	5	3:00
Legend: Win Loss Draw/No contest Notes

=== Amateur record ===
Amateur Kickboxing & Muay Thai record (incomplete)
Date	Result	Opponent	Event	Location	Method	Round	Time
2016-02-21	Loss	(Japan) Asahi Shinagawa	Bigbang Amateur 32	Tokyo, Japan	Decision	3	1:30
For the Bigabng -45kg title.
2016-02-07	Win	(Japan) Ayato Kosaka	NJKF EXPLOSION 4	Tokyo, Japan	Decision	2	1:30
2015-12-20	Win	(Japan) Asahi Shinagawa	Suk Wan Kingthong, Real Champion Tournament 42 kg Final	Tokyo, Japan	Decision		
2015-12-20	Win	(Japan) Yushin Noguchi	Suk Wan Kingthong, Real Champion Tournament 42 kg Semi Final	Tokyo, Japan	Decision		
2015-12-12	Win	(Japan) Yuuta Kitamura	JAKF AUTHORIZATION SMASHERS Champion's Carnival 2015	Tokyo, Japan	Decision	2	2:00
2015-11-29	Win	(Japan) Sho MAX	TENKAICHI 78	Okinawa, Japan	KO	2	
2015-08-30	Win	(Japan) Kanta Motoyama	1st WBC Muay Thai Jr League, All Japan Tournament Final	Tokyo, Japan	Decision		
Wins 2015 WBC Muay Thai Jr League All Japan -40kg title.
2015-08-30	Win	(Japan) Naoki Ōmura	1st WBC Muay Thai Jr League, All Japan Tournament Semi Final	Tokyo, Japan	Decision		
2015-07-05	Win	(Japan) Naoki Ōmura	NJKF EXPLOSION	Tokyo, Japan	Decision	2	1:30
2015-06-14	Win	(Japan) Suki Sugita	JAKF SMASHERS	Tokyo, Japan	KO	1	
Defends SMASHERS -40kg title.
2015-06-07	Win	(Japan) Shogo Nakano	Bigbang Amateur 29	Tokyo, Japan			
2015-04-29	Win	(Japan) Shinnosuke Yamada	NJKF EXPLOSION 1	Tokyo, Japan	Decision	2	1:30
2015-03-22	Win	(Japan) Yu Hiramatsu	JAKF SMASHERS 170	Tokyo, Japan	Decision	2	1:30
Defends SMASHERS -40kg title.
2015-03-08	Loss	(Japan) Nadaka Yoshinari	MA Nihon Kick TRADITION 2～STAIRWAY TO DREAM	Tokyo, Japan	Decision	3	2:00
For the MA Kick Jr -37kg title.
2015-02-15	Win	(Japan) Iori Maeda	Bigbang Amateur 26	Tokyo, Japan	KO	1	
Wins Bigbang Amateur -37kg title.
2014-12-23	Loss	(Japan) Jukiya Ito	Amateur REBELS BLOW-CUP.34, Final	Tokyo, Japan	Decision (Split)		
2014-12-23	Win	(Japan) Yudai Kitamura	Amateur REBELS BLOW-CUP.34, Semi Final	Tokyo, Japan	Decision (Unanimous)		
2014-12-13	Win	(Japan) Shinnosuke Yamada	INNOVATION SMASHERS Tournament, Final	Tokyo, Japan			
2014-12-13	Win	(Japan)	INNOVATION SMASHERS Tournament, Semi Final	Tokyo, Japan			
2014-12-13	Win	(Japan)	INNOVATION SMASHERS Tournament, Quarter Final	Tokyo, Japan			
2014-09-21	Win	(Japan) Shogo Nakajima	JAKF SMASHERS 167	Tokyo, Japan	Decision (Unanimous)	2	1:30
2014-09-07	Win	(Japan) Shota Torigoe	Bigbang Amateur 23	Tokyo, Japan	KO (Knees)		
2014-06-29	Loss	(Japan) Nadaka Yoshinari	Muay Thai WINDY Super Fight vol.16, Final	Tokyo, Japan	Decision (Unanimous)	5	1:00
For the Windy Super Fight -35kg title.
2014-06-29	Win	(Japan) Shogo Nakajima	Muay Thai WINDY Super Fight vol.16, Semi Final	Tokyo, Japan	Decision		
2014-06-29	Win	(Japan) Asahi Shinagawa	Muay Thai WINDY Super Fight vol.16, Quarter Final	Tokyo, Japan			
2014-06-29	Win	(Japan) Yuki Ide	Muay Thai WINDY Super Fight vol.16, First Round	Tokyo, Japan			
2014-04-13	Win	(Japan) Kippei Niina	MA Nihon Kick DRAGON.5 ～THE ONE AND ONLY～	Kanagawa, Japan	Decision (Unanimous)	3	2:00
Wins MA Kick Jr -32kg title.
2014-03-16	Win	(Japan) Shimizu Hori	REBELS.25	Tokyo, Japan	Decision	3	2:00
2014-02-23	Win	(Japan) Taison Suzuki	Bigbang Amateur 19	Tokyo, Japan	Decision		
2014-01-12	Win	(Japan) Yushin Noguchi	Muay Thai WINDY Super Fight - Muaythaiphoon	Nagoya, Japan	Decision	2	2:00
2013-12-01	Loss	(Japan) Asahi Shinagawa	Battle of Muay Thai	Yokohama, Japan	Decision	2	2:00
2013-07-14	Draw	(Japan) Asahi Shinagawa	Bigbang Amateur 15	Tokyo, Japan	Decision	2	1:30
2013-07-14	Draw	(Japan) Issei Koizumi	Bigbang Amateur 15	Tokyo, Japan	Decision	2	1:30
2013-06-30	Win	(Japan) Tōma Sugihara	Muay Thai Open 23	Tokyo, Japan	Decision (Unanimous)	3	2:00
2013-04-21	Win	(Japan) Tōma Sugihara	NJKF Muay Thai-Samklen 2	Tokyo, Japan	Decision	2	3:00
Wins NJKF Amateur -30kg title.
2013-03-03	Loss	(Japan) Ikko Ōta	Muay Thai WINDY Super Fight vol.13	Yokohama, Japan	Decision	5	1:30
For the Windy Super Fight -30kg title.
2013-02-24	Loss	(Japan) Ikko Ōta	Muay Thai open 23	Tokyo, Japan	Decision		
For the NJKF Amateur -30kg title.
2012-08-26	Loss	(Japan) Toki Tamaru	MA Japan Kickboxing Break 28	Tokyo, Japan	Decision	3	1:30
Lost the MA Kick Jr. -28kg title.
2012-08-05	Loss	(Japan) Haruto Yasumoto	Muay Yoko 19	Tokyo, Japan	Decision	2	2:00
2012-06-24	Win	(Japan) Nadaka Yoshinari	Muay Yoko 18	Ōta, Tokyo, Japan	Ex.R Decision	3	1:30
2012-06-24	Win	(Japan) Nobutaka Honda	Muay Yoko 18	Ōta, Tokyo, Japan	Decision	2	1:30
2012-05-06	Win	(Japan) Asahi Saitō	MA Japan Kick BREAK-25 - CANNONBALL	Tokyo, Japan	Decision	2	1:30
Wins the MA Kick Jr. -28kg title.
2012-04-15	Loss	(Japan) Ikkō Ōta	Bigbang Amateur 5	Tokyo, Japan	Decision	2	1:30
2011-08-07	Win	(Japan) Nadaka Yoshinari	Muay Yoko 16	Yokohama, Japan	Ex.R Decision	3	1:30
2011-07-18	Win	(Japan) Kyōsuke Higashihara	MA Japan Kick BREAK-16 - GRASP	Tokyo, Japan	Decision (Split)	3	1:30
Wins the MA Kick Jr. -28kg title.
2011-07-03	Win	(Japan) Kanta Emori	Muay Thai WINDY Super Fight in NAGOYA ～Muay Typhoon!～	Nagoya, Japan	Decision		
2011-06-05	Loss	(Japan) Naito Harada	Muay Yoko 15, Final	Nagoya, Japan	Decision	3	2:00
2011-04-29	Loss	(Japan) Takito Tamaru	Muay Thai WINDY Super Fight vol.6, Final	Tokyo, Japan	Decision	1	2:00
For the Windy Super Fight -25kg title.
2011-04-29	Win	(Japan) Kanta Emori	Muay Thai WINDY Super Fight vol.6, Semi Final	Tokyo, Japan	Decision	1	2:00
2011-04-29	Win	(Japan) Ryoga Matsudo	Muay Thai WINDY Super Fight vol.6, Quarter Final	Tokyo, Japan	Decision	1	2:00
2011-04-24	Win	(Japan) Kanta Emori	MA Japan Kick BREAK-12 -It starts-	Tokyo, Japan	Decision	3	1:30
Defends the MA Kick Jr. -25kg title.
2011-04-17	Win	(Japan) Kyōsuke Higashihara	MA kick Amateur 135	Tokyo, Japan	Ex.R Decision (Split)	4	1:30
Legend: Win Loss Draw/No contest Notes

== See also ==
- List of male kickboxers
