= Asahi Shinagawa =

Japanese Muay Thai fighter

- Born: October 14, 2001 (age 25); Yokohama, Japan
- Native name: 品川 朝陽
- Other names: Asahi P.K.Saenchaimuaythaigym (朝陽・PKセンチャイムエタイジム)
- Height: 1.68 m (5 ft 6 in)
- Weight: 55 kg (121 lb; 8.7 st)
- Division: Flyweight
- Style: Muay Thai
- Stance: Orthodox
- Fighting out of: Yokohama, Japan
- Team: Eiwa Sports Gym / P.K.Saenchaimuaythaigym
- Years active: 2016 - present

Kickboxing record
- Total: 47
- Wins: 35
- By knockout: 27
- Losses: 12
- By knockout: 5

Asahi Shinagawa is a Japanese Muay Thai fighter, also known as Asahi P.K.Saenchaimuaythaigym in Thailand. He is a former WBC Muaythai Super Bantamweight champion.

== Muay thai career ==
Shinagawa won his first major title in May 2020, when he defeated Yuzuki Sakai to capture the MA Japan Kick Flyweight title.

He was scheduled to fight Naki Sirilakmuaythai for the Muay Siam Isan Bantamweight title. Shinagawa won the fight by a second-round TKO. Asahi fought for the Lumpinee Stadium Japan Super Bantamweight title in June 2019, and won by a second round left hook KO.

Shinagawa made his ONE Championship debut during the ONE Japan Series: Road to Century event, against Satsuma Sazanami. He knocked Sazanami out in the first round.

He challenged Petchawalit Sor.Chitpattana for the IBF & WBC Muay Thai World Bantamweight titles. Petchawalit won the fight by unanimous decision.

In February 2020, Asahi fought Sing-Udon Aor.Aood-Udon for the WBC Muay Thai World Super Bantamweight title. He won the fight by a second-round low kick KO.

Shinagawa fought for ONE Championship for the second time during Road to One 3: Tokyo Fight Night, when he was scheduled to fight KING Kyosuke. He defeated Kyosuke by unanimous decision.

Shinagawa fought Jomrawee Refinas Gym for the IMC Featherweight title at BOM WAVE 03. He won the fight by unanimous decision.

Shinagawa was scheduled to fight Pon-chan BraveGym at BOM WAVE 04.

On February 2, 2021, it was announced that Shinagawa had signed with ONE Championship. He faced Joseph Lasiri at ONE: Winter Warriors II on December 17, 2021. He lost the bout via knockout in the first round.

Shinagawa faced Rui Botelho on November 19, 2022, at ONE 163. At the weigh-ins, Shinagawa weighed in at 126 pounds, 1 pounds over the strawweight limit and Shinagawa was fined 20% of his purse, which will go to his opponent Botelho. He won the fight via split decision.

== Championships and accomplishments ==
=== Amateur ===
- 2013 BigBang -31 kg Champion
- 2014 Windy Sports -40 kg Champion
- 2014 BOM -40 kg Champion
- 2015 DBS Kids Tournament -40 kg Winner
- 2015 MA Kick Jr -42 kg Champion
- 2016 Muay Thai Open -45 kg Champion
- 2016 Bigbang -45 kg Champion
- 2016 MuayThaiOpen -50 kg Champion
- 2016 UKF Junior -50 kg Champion
- 2016 BOM -50 kg Champion

=== Professional ===
- Martial Arts Japan Kickboxing Federation
  - 2018 MAJKF Flyweight Champion
- Muay Siam Isan
  - 2019 Muay Siam Isan Bantamweight Champion
- Lumpinee Stadium of Japan
  - 2019 LPNJ Super Bantamweight Champion
- World Boxing Council Muaythai
  - 2020 WBC Muay Thai World Super Bantamweight Champion
- international MuayThai Council
  - 2020 IMC International Featherweight Champion
- International Professional Combat Council
  - 2022 IPCC World Featherweight Champion
- World Muaythai Council
  - 2023 WMC Asia Featherweight Champion
- Battle of Muaythai
  - 2025 BOM Open Finger Gloves Featherweight Champion
- Professional Boxing Association of Thailand (PAT)
  - 2026 Thailand Featherweight Champion

== Fight record ==
Professional Muay Thai record
35 Wins (26 (T)KOs), 12 Losses, 1 Draw
Date	Result	Opponent	Event	Location	Method	Round	Time
2026-09-12		(Thailand) Tuakiao Wor.Wanchai	ONE Samurai 3	Tokyo, Japan			
2026-07-31	Win	(Mexico) Salvador Velazquez Villarello	ONE The Inner Circle 24, Lumpinee Stadium	Bangkok, Thailand	TKO (3 Knockdowns)	2	2:26
2026-04-05	Win	(Thailand) Petchaophraya Sitkamnanneng	BOM 50	Yokohama, Japan	KO (Left hook to the body)	1	2:09
Wins the vacant Thailand Featherweight title.
2025-12-19	Loss	(Thailand) Denkriangkrai Singha Mawynn	ONE Friday Fights 137, Lumpinee Stadium	Bangkok, Thailand	Decision (Unanimous)	3	3:00
2025-10-05	Win	(Thailand) Saiphet Sor.Wisanupon	BOM OUROBOROS 2025	Yokosuka, Japan	KO (Left hook to the body)	1	1:15
Wins the inaugural BOM Open Finger Gloves Featherweight title.
2025-06-27	Win	(Thailand) Petphupa Aekpujean	ONE Friday Fights 114, Lumpinee Stadium	Bangkok, Thailand	Decision (Unanimous)	3	3:00
2025-05-11	Win	(Thailand) Palangphet Chor.Champion	BOM x Space ONE Japan	Tokyo, Japan	TKO (4 Knockdowns)	3	2:17
2025-02-22	Loss	(Uzbekistan) Samandar Khasanov	Rajadamnern World Series	Bangkok, Thailand	Decision (Unanimous)	3	3:00
2024-12-01	Win	(Brazil) Nicolas Leite Silva	Rajadamnern World Series Japan	Yokohama, Japan	KO (Left hook to the body)	1	1:45
2024-10-13	Draw	(Cambodia) Thun Phanit	BOM 49	Tokyo, Japan	Decision (Unanimous)	5	3:00
2024-07-14	Win	(Thailand) Chaiyakorn Por.Lakboon	Rajadamnern World Series Japan	Chiba, Japan	KO (Left hook to the body)	1	1:53
2024-06-15	Win	(Uzbekistan) Nur Mohammad	Rajadamnern World Series	Bangkok, Thailand	Decision (Unanimous)	3	3:00
2024-03-23	Win	(Thailand) Petchwaewwow Kiatchatchai	Rajadamnern World Series	Bangkok, Thailand	KO (Left hook to the body)	1	1:05
2024-01-21	Win	(Thailand) Surasak KrudamGym	TOP BRIGHTS 1	Tokyo, Japan	KO (Low kick)	2	2:04
2023-12-22	Win	(Thailand) Superman Banchamek	Amazing Muay Thai: Road to Rajadamnern, Rajadamnern Stadium	Bangkok, Thailand	KO (Left hook)	2	1:37
Wins the vacant WMC Asia Featherweight title.
2023-11-26	Win	(Thailand) Narit Sor.Somnuk	BOM 45	Yokohama, Japan	KO (Low kick)	2	2:45
2023-10-01	Win	(Thailand) Lukbon LB MuayThai	BOM 44	Yokosuka, Japan	KO (Left hook)	1	1:14
2023-08-06	Win	(Thailand) Muangphet Rachanon	BOM 43	Yokohama, Japan	KO (Left hook to the body)	1	2:30
2022-11-19	Win	(Portugal) Rui Botelho	ONE 163	Kallang, Singapore	Decision (Split)	3	3:00
2022-09-23	Win	(Thailand) Peym Baraikankendon	The Battle of Muay Thai "OUROBOROS"	Tokyo, Japan	KO (Left hook)	4	1:36
Wins the vacant IPCC World Featherweight title.
2021-12-03	Loss	(Italy) Joseph Lasiri	ONE: Winter Warriors II	Kallang, Singapore	KO (Punch + Knee)	1	2:05
2021-07-04	Win	(Japan) Motoaki Takahashi	The Battle Of Muay Thai WAVE 05 - Get over the COVID-19	Yokohama, Japan	Decision (Unanimous)	3	3:00
2021-04-11	Win	(Thailand) Pon-chan BraveGym	The Battle Of Muay Thai WAVE 04 - Get over the COVID-19	Yokohama, Japan	Decision (Unanimous)	5	3:00
2020-12-06	Win	(Thailand) Jomrawee Refinas Gym	The Battle Of Muay Thai WAVE 03 - Get over the COVID-19	Yokohama, Japan	Decision (Unanimous)	5	3:00
Wins the IMC Featherweight title.
2020-09-10	Win	(Japan) KING Kyosuke	Road to One 3: Tokyo Fight Night	Tokyo, Japan	Decision (Unanimous)	3	3:00
2020-02-09	Win	(Thailand) Sing-Udon Aor.Aood-Udon	The Battle Of Muay Thai SEASON II vol.7	Tokyo, Japan	KO (Low kick)	2	1:44
Wins the WBC Muay Thai World Super Bantamweight title.
2019-12-08	Loss	(Thailand) Petchawarit Sor.Jitpattana	The Battle Of Muay Thai SEASON II vol.6 pt.2	Tokyo, Japan	Decision (Unanimous)	5	3:00
For the IBF & WBC Muay Thai World Bantamweight title.
2019-09-01	Win	(Japan) Satsuma Sazanami	ONE Japan Series: Road to Century	Tokyo, Japan	KO (Left hook)	1	1:37
2019-06-01	Win	(Thailand) Samsien Sirilakmuaythai	The Battle Of MuayThai SEASON II vol.2	Yokohama, Japan	KO (Left hook)	2	1:20
Wins Lumpinee Stadium Japan Super Bantamweight title.
2019-04-14	Win	(Thailand) Naki Sirilakmuaythai	The Battle Of MuayThai SEASON II vol.1	Yokohama, Japan	TKO (Left hooks)	2	2:20
Wins Muay Siam Isan Bantamweight title.
2019-02-10	Loss	(Thailand) Yodmeechai Kiatjamrun	OrTorGor.3 stadium	Nonthaburi, Thailand	TKO (Left body kick)	3	
2018-12-09	Win	(Thailand) Maoklee Phetsimuean	BOMXX -The Battle Of MuaytThai 20-	Yokohama, Japan	TKO (Left hook to the body)	2	
2018-08-10	Loss	(Thailand) Singpayak Sitpanon	Lumpinee Stadium	Bangkok, Thailand	TKO (Low blow)	2	
2018-06-30	Win	(Thailand) Panomtuan Rongrienkratiemwittaya	Lumpinee Stadium	Bangkok, Thailand	KO (Left hook to the body)	2	
2018-05-20	Win	(Japan) Yuzuki Sakai	MAJKF FIGHT FOR PEACE 9	Tokyo, Japan	Decision (Majority)	3	3:00
Wins MAJKF Flyweight title.
2018-03-30	Loss	(Thailand) Yothin Kiatyothin	Lumpinee Stadium	Bangkok, Thailand	KO	3	
2018-02-18	Win	(Thailand) Payakdum Singmawin	Nonthaburi Stadium	Nonthaburi, Thailand	KO (Left hooks)	2	
2017-12-19	Win	(Thailand) Tonbai Peminburi	Lumpinee Stadium	Bangkok, Thailand	KO (Left hook to the body)	1	
2017-09-05	Win	(Thailand) Lekboran	Lumpinee Stadium	Bangkok, Thailand	KO (Left hook to the body)	2	
2017-08-06	Win	(Japan) Shotaro Maeda	The Battle Of Muaythai XV	Tokyo, Japan	Decision (Unanimous)	3	3:00
2017-07-21	Loss	(Thailand) Attaphon Sor.Kongdetch	Lumpinee Stadium	Bangkok, Thailand	KO	3	
2017-06-18	Win	(Thailand) Rachasi NornaksingTokyo	Muay Lok 2017 2nd	Tokyo, Japan	KO (Left hook to the body)	2	
2017-04-09	Win	(Japan) Shinta	BOM14 - The Battle Of Muay Thai 14 -	Tokyo, Japan	KO (Left hook)	2	1:49
2017-03-05	Win	(Japan) Riichi Hoshino	Muay Lok 2017 1st	Tokyo, Japan	KO (Right Hook)	1	0:46
2016-09-30	Loss	(Thailand) Petchseekew Chor.Sampeenong	MAX Muay Thai	Bangkok, Thailand	Decision	3	3:00
2016-06-26	Loss	(Japan) Kaito Gibu	K-SPIRIT 14	Okinawa, Japan	Decision (Unanimous)	5	3:00
2016-03-06	Win	(Thailand) Sontichip Londiemsamkor	Rajadamnern Stadium	Bangkok, Thailand	KO (Punches)	4	
2015-08-15	Loss	(Thailand) Kwayna Nathakinpla	Lumpinee Stadium "Krirkkrai"	Bangkok, Thailand	Decision	5	2:00
2015-06-20	Loss	(Thailand) Satanfaa Sakdiwarun	Lumpinee Stadium "Krirkkrai"	Bangkok, Thailand	Decision	5	2:00
Legend: Win Loss Draw/No contest Notes

=== Amateur record ===
Amateur Muay Thai Record
Date	Result	Opponent	Event	Location	Method	Round	Time
2016-12-25	Win	(Japan) Kyosuke Takarabe	MuayThaiOpen37	Tokyo, Japan	Decision	3	2:00
Wins MuayThaiOpen -50kg title.
2016-11-06	Win	(Japan) Tokimasa Yamaguchi	BOM Amateur 17	Tokyo, Japan	Decision	3	2:00
Wins BOM -50kg title.
2016-10-09	Win	(Japan) Kyosuke Zaibe	Muay Thai Super Fight Suk Wan Kingthong, vol.6	Tokyo, Japan	Decision (Unanimous)	2	2:00
2016-10-09	Win	(Japan) Raito Tamagawa	Muay Thai Super Fight Suk Wan Kingthong, vol.6	Tokyo, Japan	Decision (Unanimous)	2	2:00
2016-07-17	Win	(Japan) Ryuto Terasaki	MuayThaiOpen35 & LumpineeBoxingStadium of Japan	Tokyo, Japan	Decision		
2016-07-17	Win	(Japan) Kyosuke Zaibe	MuayThaiOpen35 & LumpineeBoxingStadium of Japan	Tokyo, Japan	Decision		
2016-07-10	Win	(Japan) Koumei Nakamura	Bigbang Amateur 35	Tokyo, Japan	KO	1	
2016-07-10	Win	(Japan) Koki Okutomi	Bigbang Amateur 35	Tokyo, Japan	KO	2	
2016-05-01	Win	(Japan) KONOMU	World Martial Arts League 2016 UKF Championship	Tokyo, Japan	Decision (Unanimous)	3	2:00
Wins UKF Junior -50kg title.
2016-04-29	Win	(Japan) Uta Ishida	SMASHERS 179	Tokyo, Japan	Decision (Unanimous)		
2016-03-27	Win	(Japan) Kohei Ohashi	Shizuoka Kick	Shizuoka, Japan	TKO	2	
2016-02-21	Win	(Japan) Ryuya Okuwaki	Bigbang Amateur 32	Tokyo, Japan	Decision	3	1:30
Wins Bigbang -45kg title.
2016-02-07	Win	(Japan) Kikuchi	MuayThaiOpen 34	Tokyo, Japan	Decision	3	2:00
Wins MuayThaiOpen -45kg title.
2015-12-20	Loss	(Japan) Ryuya Okuwaki	Suk Wan Kingthong, Real Champion Tournament 42 kg Final	Tokyo, Japan	Decision		
2015-12-20	Win	(Japan) Ryuta Nishimura	Suk Wan Kingthong, Real Champion Tournament 42 kg Semi Final	Tokyo, Japan	Decision		
2015-12-06	Win	(Japan) Yushin Noguchi	BOM 10 ～The 10th anniversary tournament～	Yokohama, Japan	Decision	5	2:00
2015-08-02	Loss	(Japan) Hyuga Umemoto	Muay Thai Super Fight Suk Wan Kingthong, Real Champion Tournament 42 kg Final	Tokyo, Japan	Decision (Unanimous)	2	1:30
For the Suk Wan Kingthong 42kg title.
2015-08-02	Win	(Japan) Sōta Amano	Muay Thai Super Fight Suk Wan Kingthong, Real Champion Tournament 42 kg Semi Final	Tokyo, Japan	TKO	2	
2015-07-26	Win	(Japan) Ren Hiromatsu	A-LEAGUE 31 DELUXE, 40 kg Tournament Final	Sendai, Japan	Decision (Unanimous)		
2015-07-26	Win	(Japan) Akito Suwa	A-LEAGUE 31 DELUXE, 40 kg Tournament Semi Final	Sendai, Japan	Decision (Unanimous)		
2015-06-14	Draw	(Japan) Haruki Ohno	JAKF SMASHERS 6	Japan	Decision	2	2:00
2015-04-29	Win	(Japan) Shinnosuke Hatsuda	The Battle Of Muay Thai 8	Yokohama, Japan	Decision (Unanimous)	5	2:00
2015-03-29	Draw	(Japan) Yuga Ishibe	MuayThaiPhoon vol.1	Nagoya, Japan	Decision	2	2:00
2015-03-08	Win	(Japan) Raito Tamagawa	MA Nihon Kick TRADITION 2～STAIRWAY TO DREAM	Tokyo, Japan	Decision (Unanimous)	3	2:00
Wins MA Kick Jr -42kg title.
2015-02-08	Win	(Japan) Haruki Ohno	BOM Amateur 9	Yokohama, Japan	Decision	3	2:00
2014-12-21	Win	(Japan) Kazuki Miburo	WINDY SPORTS	Tokyo, Japan	Decision	5	
Wins inaugural WINDY SPORTS Muay Thai -40kg title.
2014-12-14	Win	(Japan) Shogo Nakajima	BOM Amateur 8	Yokohama, Japan	Decision	3	2:00
Wins BOM -40kg title.
2014-10-19	Loss	(Japan) Nadaka Yoshinari	WPMF BOM Amateur, Final	Yokohama, Japan	Decision	2	2:00
For the BOM Junior tournament title.
2014-10-19	Win	(Japan) Tadashi P.K	WPMF BOM Amateur, Semi Final	Yokohama, Japan	Decision	2	2:00
2014-10-13	Win	(Japan) Ren Shibata	MUAYTHAI WINDY SUPER FIGHT vol.18 in Kyoto	Kyoto, Japan	Decision (Majority)	2	2:00
2014-10-06	Win	(Japan) Ren Shibata	MUAY THAI WINDY SUPER FIGHT vol.18 IN KYOTO	Kyoto, Japan	Decision (Majority)	2	2:00
2014-07-06	Loss	(Japan) Haruki Ohno	The Battle of Muay Thai Amateur 7	Tokyo, Japan	Decision	2	2:00
2014-07-06	Win	(Japan) Shogo Nakajima	The Battle of Muay Thai Amateur 7	Tokyo, Japan	Decision	2	2:00
2014-06-29	Loss	(Japan) Ryuya Okuwaki	Muay Thai WINDY Super Fight vol.16, Quarter Final	Tokyo, Japan			
2014-06-29	Win	(Japan) Shoma Ideguchi	Muay Thai WINDY Super Fight vol.16, First Round	Tokyo, Japan			
2014-05-06	Loss	(Japan) Shogo Nakajima	The Battle of Muay Thai Amateur 6	Yokohama, Japan	Decision	3	2:00
For the BOM and WPMF -35kg title
2014-04-13	Loss	(Japan) Nadaka Yoshinari	BOM Amateur 5	Yokohama, Japan	Decision	2	2:00
2014-01-19	Loss	(Japan) Rento Komiyama	BOM Amateur 4	Yokohama, Japan	Decision	2	2:00
2013-12-01	Loss	(Japan) Nadaka Yoshinari	3rd BOM Amateur Competition, Final	Yokohama, Japan	Decision	2	2:00
For the Battle of Muaythai (BOM) -32.5kg class tournament.
2013-12-01	Win	(Japan) Ryuya Okuwaki	Battle of Muay Thai	Yokohama, Japan	Decision	2	2:00
2013-09-01	Win	(Japan) Issei Koizumi	Bigbang Amateur 16	Tokyo, Japan	Decision	3	2:00
Wins Bigbang Amateur -31kg title.
2013-08-10	Loss	(Japan) Ryusei Kumagai	MAJKF KICK GUTS 2013	Tokyo, Japan	Decision (Unanimous)	2	2:00
2013-07-14	Draw	(Japan) Ryuya Okuwaki	Bigbang Amateur 15	Tokyo, Japan	Decision	2	1:30
2013-07-14	Win	(Japan) Issei Koizumi	Bigbang Amateur 15	Tokyo, Japan	Decision (Split)	2	1:30
2013-05-12	Loss	(Japan) Toki Tamaru	BOM Battle of Muay Thai Amateur, Final	Tokyo, Japan	Decision	2	2:00
2013-05-05	Win	(Japan) Ryuto Tsukano	BigBang Amateur 13	Tokyo, Japan	KO		
2013-04-14	Win	(Japan) Chiharu Nara	BOM I～The Battle of Muaythai～ Part.1	Kanagawa, Japan	Decision (Split)	2	2:00
Legend: Win Loss Draw/No contest Notes

== See also ==
- List of male kickboxers
- List of WBC Muaythai world champions
