= Songchainoi Kiatsongrit =

Thai Muay Thai fighter

Songchainoi
- Born: August 27, 2000 (age 26); Samut Prakan, Thailand
- Other names: Palangphon Lukpaknam (พลังพล ลูกปากน้ำ)
- Height: 156 cm (5 ft 1 in)
- Weight: 52 kg (115 lb; 8.2 st)
- Style: Muay Thai (Muay Matt)
- Stance: Orthodox
- Fighting out of: Bangkok, Thailand
- Team: Kiatsongrit

Kickboxing record
- Total: 21
- Wins
- By knockout: 60
- Losses: 21

Songchainoi Kiatsongrit (Thai: ทรงชัยน้อย เกียรติทรงฤทธิ์) is a Thai Muay Thai fighter.

== Career ==
Songchainoi was scheduled to face Phetsuphan Por.Daorungruang for the vacant S-1 Super Flyweight title on May 1, 2022. He won the fight by decision.

In 2021, after a competition pause due to the covid-19 pandemic, Songchainoi went on a six fights winning culmainating on July 9, 2022, in a decision win against Yoknungdej Phetsithong at the Omnoi Stadium.

On September 25, 2022, Songchainoi travelled to Japan to face Momu Tsukamoto at NJKF West 4th - 1st Stage. He won the fight by a first-round technical knockout, as he was twice knocked down with a right cross before the referee stopped the bout.

=== ONE Championship ===
Songchainoi made his ONE Championship debut at ONE Friday Fights 2 against Yoddoi Kaewsamrit on January 23, 2023. He won the fight by unanimous decision but suffered broken fingers during the bout which required surgery.

Songchainoi returned to Japan on April 9, 2023, to faced Nadaka Yoshinari at BOM Ouroboros 2023. He lost the fight by third technical knockout after three knockdowns.

Songchainoi's third fight in Japan happened on July 9, 2023, when he faced Jurai Ishii at BOM 41. He won the fight by majority decision.

On September 22, 2023, Songchainoi faced Jomhod Eminentair at ONE Friday Fights 34. He won the fight by second round technical knockout. After this result Songchainoi was ranked as the #1 muay fighter in the world at 115 lbs by the WBC Muay Thai.

On April 6, 2024, Songchainoi faced Nicolas Leite Silva at ONE Fight Night 21. He won the fight by unanimous decision.

On December 20, 2024, Songchainoi faced Yodnumchai Fairtex at ONE Friday Fights 92,. He won the fight by second knockout. He received a 350,000 baht bonus for his performance.

On March 14, 2025, Songchainoi faced Teeyai P.K.Saenchai at ONE Friday Fights 100. He won the fight by unanimous decision.

Songchainoi was scheduled to face Numsurin Chor.Ketwina at ONE Friday Fights 122 on August 29, 2025. Before the bout he was on a 9 fight winning streak inside the promotion. He lost the fight by majority decision after receiving an eight count.

Songchainoi faced Salai Htan Khee Shein at ONE Friday Fights 130 on October 24, 2025. He won the fight by unanimous decision.

Songchainoi was scheduled to challenge Nadaka Yoshinari for his ONE Atomweight Muay Thai World Championship at ONE Samurai 1 on April 29, 2026. He lost the fight by unanimous decision.

== Titles and accomplishments ==
- Onesongchai
  - 2022 S-1 Super Flyweight (115 lbs) Champion

== Muay Thai record ==
Muay Thai record
60 Wins, 22 Losses
Date	Result	Opponent	Event	Location	Method	Round	Time
2026-12-04		(Malaysia) Rifdean Masdor	ONE The Inner Circle 41, Lumpinee Stadium	Bangkok, Thailand			
2026-08-21	Loss	(Thailand) Banluelok Sitwatcharachai	ONE The Inner Circle 27, Lumpinee Stadium	Bangkok, Thailand	Decision (Unanimous)	3	3:00
2026-06-26	Loss	(Thailand) Numsurin Chor.Ketwina	ONE Friday Fights 160, Lumpinee Stadium	Bangkok, Thailand	Decision (Unanimous)	3	3:00
2026-04-29	Loss	(Japan) Nadaka Yoshinari	ONE Samurai 1	Tokyo, Japan	Decision (Unanimous)	5	3:00
For the ONE Atomweight Muay Thai World Championship.
2025-10-24	Win	(Myanmar) Salai Htan Khee Shein	ONE Friday Fights 130, Lumpinee Stadium	Bangkok, Thailand	Decision (Unanimous)	3	3:00
2025-08-29	Loss	(Thailand) Numsurin Chor.Ketwina	ONE Friday Fights 122	Bangkok, Thailand	Decision (Majority)	3	3:00
2025-03-14	Win	(Thailand) Teeyai P.K.Saenchai	ONE Friday Fights 100, Lumpinee Stadium	Bangkok, Thailand	Decision (Unanimous)	3	3:00
2024-12-20	Win	(Thailand) Yodnumchai Fairtex	ONE Friday Fights 92, Lumpinee Stadium	Bangkok, Thailand	KO (Punches)	2	1:18
2024-07-19	Win	(Thailand) Rak Erawan	ONE Friday Fights 71, Lumpinee Stadium	Bangkok, Thailand	Decision (Unanimous)	3	3:00
2024-04-06	Win	(Brazil) Nicolas Leite Silva	ONE Fight Night 21	Bangkok, Thailand	Decision (Unanimous)	3	3:00
2023-11-17	Win	(Thailand) Rak Erawan	ONE Friday Fights 41, Lumpinee Stadium	Bangkok, Thailand	Decision (Unanimous)	3	3:00
2023-09-22	Win	(Thailand) Jomhod Eminentair	ONE Friday Fights 34, Lumpinee Stadium	Bangkok, Thailand	TKO (3 knockdowns)	2	0:54
2023-08-25	Win	(Thailand) Chokdee Maxjandee	ONE Friday Fights 30, Lumpinee Stadium	Bangkok, Thailand	KO (Punches to the body)	2	1:45
2023-07-09	Win	(Japan) Jurai Ishii	BOM 41	Tokyo, Japan	Decision (Majority)	5	3:00
2023-06-30	Win	(Thailand) Mungkorn Boomdeksian	ONE Friday Fights 23, Lumpinee Stadium	Bangkok, Thailand	KO (Flying knee)	3	1:52
2023-04-09	Loss	(Japan) Nadaka Yoshinari	BOM Ouroboros 2023	Tokyo, Japan	TKO (3 knockdowns)	3	1:47
2023-01-27	Win	(Thailand) Yoddoi Kaewsamrit	ONE Friday Fights 2, Lumpinee Stadium	Bangkok, Thailand	Decision (Unanimous)	3	3:00
2022-12-24	Loss	(Thailand) Khunsueknoi Boomdeksian	Palangmai	Ratchaburi province, Thailand	Decision	5	3:00
2022-11-30	Loss	(Thailand) Petchrung Sitkrunote	Punch it Fight Night, Phetchbuncha Stadium	Ko Samui	Decision	5	3:00
2022-09-25	Win	(Japan) Momu Tsukamoto	NJKF West 4th - 1st Stage	Osaka, Japan	TKO (Right cross)	1	1:36
2022-08-11	Loss	(Thailand) Detchpet Wor.Sangprapai	Petchyindee, Rajadamnern Stadium	Bangkok, Thailand	Decision	5	3:00
2022-07-09	Win	(Thailand) Yoknungdej Phetsithong	Jao MuayThai, Omnoi Stadium	Samut Sakhon, Thailand	Decision	5	3:00
2022-06-11	Win	(Thailand) Petchsingkom Or.Kittikasem	Jitmuangnon	Nonthaburi, Thailand	Decision	5	3:00
2022-05-01	Win	(Thailand) Phetsuphan Por.Daorungruang	SuekMahachon Onesongchai	Kamphaeng Phet, Thailand	Decision	5	3:00
Wins the vacant S-1 Super Flyweight title.
2022-01-22	Win	(Thailand) Chatpichit SorSor Toipadriew	MuayDee WIthiThai, Jitmuangnon Stadium	Nonthaburi, Thailand	Decision	5	3:00
2021-12-11	Win	(Thailand) Jomdet Kiatpaepae	Lumpini Muay Thai TKO, Lumpinee Stadium	Bangkok, Thailand	Decision	5	3:00
2021-11-21	Win	(Thailand) Chen Jitmuangnon	Jitmuangnon Stadium	Nonthaburi, Thailand	KO	3	
2021-03-24	Win	(Thailand) Phetbuengkan Lookchaomaesaithong	Chef Boontham	Nonthaburi, Thailand	Decision	5	3:00
Legend: Win Loss Draw/No contest Notes
