= Rak Erawan =

Thai Muay Thai fighter

- Born: Suparak Somchit; April 26, 2001 (age 25); Pattani province, Thailand
- Other names: Rak Sor.Somchit (รักษ์ ส.สมจิต)
- Height: 164 cm (5 ft 5 in)
- Weight: 52 kg (115 lb; 8.2 st)
- Stance: Orthodox
- Fighting out of: Yala, Thailand
- Team: Erawan

Rak Erawan (Thai: รักษ์ เอราวัณ) is a Thai Muay Thai fighter.

== Career ==
Rak started training in Muay Thai at the age of 10, fighting out of the Wor Watchawit gym. He joined the Erawan camp in Yala in 2016.

On October 14, 2018, Rak challenged Rongod Sarakham for the Channel 7 Stadium pinweight title. He lost the fight by decision.

On June 29, 2019, Rak defeated Komkrit Kritifuengfu by decision on the Ruamponkon Samui promotion in the Surat Thani province.

Rak suffered his only knockout loss on the Bangkok circuit when he faced Pon Parunchai at Lumpinee Stadium for the Kiatpetch promotion on September 3, 2019. He was sent down twice with punches before the referee stopped the fight.

Rak became a stadium champion for the first time on December 6, 2019, when he defeated Singhalek Sor.Chokmeechai by decision for the Lumpinee Stadium 108 lbs title. After this win he was ranked the #4 muay thai fighter in the world at 108 lbs by the WMO.

On March 5, 2020, Rak captured the Thailand 108 lbs title when he knocked out Domethong Lookchaoporongtom with elbows in the third round at Lumpinee Stadium.

In March 2021, Rak defeated Petchongrak FighterMuaythai by decision in a Muaywitthitai road show in the Pattani province.

On July 17, 2022, Rak challenged Jomhod Eminentair for his Channel 7 Stadium 115 lbs title. He won the fight by decision. Rak successfully defended his title against Ratchadet TNMuaythai on September 25, 2022, pushing his winning streak to nine in a row. Following this victory Rak was ranked as the #2 115 lbs muay thai fighter in the world by the WMO and #3 by the WBC Muay Thai.

On March 24, 2023, Rak defeated Chusap Sor.Salacheep by first-round knockout at ONE Friday Fights 10. He received a 350,000 baht bonus for his performance. As of April 2023 he was ranked #3 in the world at 115 lbs by Combat Press.

For his second apparition for ONE Championship Rak knocked out Mahasamut Nayokgungmuangpet in the second round at ONE Friday Fights 17 on May 19, 2023.

== Titles and accomplishments ==
- Professional Boxing Association of Thailand (PAT)
  - 2020 Thailand 108 lbs Champion
- Lumpinee Stadium
  - 2019 Lumpinee Stadium 108 lbs Champion
- Channel 7 Boxing Stadium
  - 2022 Channel 7 Stadium 115 lbs Champion (one defense)

== Fight record ==
Muay Thai Record
Date	Result	Opponent	Event	Location	Method	Round	Time
2026-11-20	Loss	(Myanmar) Salai Htan Khee Shein	ONE The Inner Circle 39, Lumpinee Stadium	Bangkok, Thailand	KO (punches)	2	
2026-09-04	Win	(Thailand) Hern NF.Looksuan	ONE The Inner Circle 29, Lumpinee Stadium	Bangkok, Thailand	TKO (3 Knockdowns)	1	
2026-06-05	Loss	(Thailand) Banluelok Sitwatcharachai	ONE Friday Fights 157, Lumpinee Stadium	Bangkok, Thailand	KO (Punch)	3	1:21
2025-03-23	Loss	(Japan) Nadaka Yoshinari	ONE 172	Saitama, Japan	KO (Left cross)	3	2:40
2024-12-20	Win	(Thailand) Koko Sor.Sommai	ONE Friday Fights 92, Lumpinee Stadium	Bangkok, Thailand	TKO (retirement)	1	3:00
2024-09-20	Loss	(Thailand) Yodnumchai Fairtex	ONE Friday Fights 80, Lumpinee Stadium	Bangkok, Thailand	Decision (Unanimous)	3	3:00
2024-07-19	Loss	(Thailand) Songchainoi Kiatsongrit	ONE Friday Fights 71, Lumpinee Stadium	Bangkok, Thailand	Decision (Unanimous)	3	3:00
2024-05-17	Win	(Brazil) Nicolas Leite Silva	ONE Friday Fights 63, Lumpinee Stadium	Bangkok, Thailand	Decision (Unanimous)	3	3:00
2023-03-22	Win	(Japan) Shuto Sato	ONE Friday Fights 56, Lumpinee Stadium	Bangkok, Thailand	KO (Body punches)	2	1:19
2023-11-17	Loss	(Thailand) Songchainoi Kiatsongrit	ONE Friday Fights 41, Lumpinee Stadium	Bangkok, Thailand	Decision (Unanimous)	3	3:00
2023-05-19	Win	(Thailand) Mahasamut Nayokgungmuangpet	ONE Friday Fights 17, Lumpinee Stadium	Bangkok, Thailand	KO (Body punches)	2	1:35
2023-03-24	Win	(Thailand) Chusap Sor.Salacheep	ONE Friday Fights 10, Lumpinee Stadium	Bangkok, Thailand	TKO (Punches)	1	1:12
2022-09-25	Win	(Thailand) Ratchadet TNmuaythai	MuayThai 7see, Channel 7 Stadium	Bangkok, Thailand	Decision	5	3:00
Defends the Channel 7 Stadium 115 lbs title.
2022-07-17	Win	(Thailand) Jomhod Eminentair	MuayThai 7see, Channel 7 Stadium	Bangkok, Thailand	Decision (Unanimous)	5	3:00
Wins the Channel 7 Stadium 115 lbs title.
2022-05-29	Win	(Thailand) Den Sor.PhetUdon	MuayThai 7see, Channel 7 Stadium	Bangkok, Thailand	Decision	5	3:00
2022-04-10	Win	(Thailand) Mahasamut Nayokgungmuangpet	MuayThai 7see, Channel 7 Stadium	Bangkok, Thailand	Decision	5	3:00
2022-02-27	Win	(Thailand) Thongpoon Sit Phananchoeng	Kiatpetch, Rajadamnern Stadium	Bangkok, Thailand	Decision	5	3:00
2022-01-09	Win	(Thailand) Ninmangkon UFA Boomdeksien	MuayThai 7see, Channel 7 Stadium	Bangkok, Thailand	Decision	5	3:00
2021-10-23	Win	(Thailand) Yokkiri TNMuaythai	TKO Kiatpetch	Buriram province, Thailand	Decision	5	3:00
2021-03-13	Win	(Thailand) Petchjongrak Wor.Sangprapai	Muay Witthitai	Pattani province, Thailand	Decision	5	3:00
2020-11-15	Win	(Thailand) Pon Parunchai	Kiatpetch, Jitmuangnon Stadium	Nonthaburi, Thailand	Decision	5	3:00
2020-08-13	Loss	(Thailand) Petchbanrai Singmawynn	Singmawynn, Rajadamnern Stadium	Bangkok, Thailand	Decision	5	3:00
2020-03-06	Win	(Thailand) Domethong Lookchaoporongtom	Lumpinee Champion Krikkrai, Lumpinee Stadium	Bangkok, Thailand	TKO (Elbows)	3	
Wins the Thailand 108 lbs title.
2020-01-19	Win	(Thailand) Domethong Lookchaoporongtom	MuayThai 7see, Channel 7 Stadium	Bangkok, Thailand	Decision	5	3:00
2019-12-06	Win	(Thailand) Singhalek Sor.Chokmeechai	Kiatpetch, Lumpinee Stadium	Bangkok, Thailand	Decision	5	3:00
Wins the Lumpinee Stadium 108 lbs title.
2019-11-05	Win	(Thailand) Phet-Ek Kiatjamrun	Kiatpetch, Lumpinee Stadium	Bangkok, Thailand	Decision	5	3:00
2019-09-03	Loss	(Thailand) Pon Parunchai	Kiatpetch, Lumpinee Stadium	Bangkok, Thailand	KO (Punches)	2	1:55
2019-06-29	Win	(Thailand) Komkrit Kritifuengfu	Ruamponkon Samui	Surat Thani province, Thailand	Decision	5	3:00
2018-10-14	Loss	(Thailand) Ployrungphet Tded99	MuayThai 7see, Channel 7 Stadium	Bangkok, Thailand	Decision	5	3:00
For the Channel 7 Stadium 100 lbs title.
2018-09-07	Win	(Thailand) Phetnamchok Sor.Jor.Tongprachin	Kiatpetch, Lumpinee Stadium	Bangkok, Thailand	KO (Middle kick/arm injury)	5	
2018-06-22	Win	(Thailand) Singdam Kafaefocus	Phetnumnoi, Lumpinee Stadium	Bangkok, Thailand	Decision	5	3:00
2018-05-22	Win	(Thailand) Sakklek Phetcharoenwit	Phetnumnoi + Phoenix 8, Lumpinee Stadium	Bangkok, Thailand	Decision	5	3:00
2018-02-04	Loss	(Thailand) Yodnakrob Chor.Hapayak	MuayThai 7see, Channel 7 Stadium	Bangkok, Thailand	Decision	5	3:00
2018-01-09	Win	(Thailand) Faenchan PakornphonSurin	Kiatpetch, Lumpinee Stadium	Bangkok, Thailand	KO	2	
2017-12-12	Win	(Thailand) Kumanthong SantiUbon	Kiatpetch, Lumpinee Stadium	Bangkok, Thailand	Decision	5	3:00
2017-11-14	Win	(Thailand) Phet-Ubon T.K.P. Gym	P.K.Saenchai, Lumpinee Stadium	Bangkok, Thailand	KO	2	
2017-07-04	Win	(Thailand) Jaiphet Tasowsport	Kiatpetch, Lumpinee Stadium	Bangkok, Thailand	Decision	5	3:00
2017-04-29	Win	(Thailand) Giant Singpomprap	Kiatpetch, Lumpinee Stadium	Bangkok, Thailand	Decision	5	3:00
2017-04-01	Win	(Thailand) Phetangkarn Sitkamnanprasert	Kiatpetch, Lumpinee Stadium	Bangkok, Thailand	KO	3	
2017-02-12	Win	(Thailand) Krungthai TDed99	MuayThai 7see, Channel 7 Stadium	Bangkok, Thailand	KO	4	
Legend: Win Loss Draw/No contest Notes
