= ONE Friday Fights 10 =

Combat sport events in 2023

ONE Friday Fights 10: Yodkrisada vs. Thepthaksin
- Promotion: ONE Championship
- Date: March 24, 2023
- Venue: Lumpinee Boxing Stadium
- City: Bangkok, Thailand

Event chronology
ONE Friday Fights 9: Eersel vs. Sinsamut 2	ONE Friday Fights 10: Yodkrisada vs. Thepthaksin	ONE Fight Night 8: Superlek vs. Williams

ONE Friday Fights 10: Yodkrisada vs. Thepthaksin (also known as ONE Lumpinee 10) was a combat sports event produced by ONE Championship that took place on March 24, 2023, at Lumpinee Boxing Stadium in Bangkok, Thailand.

== Background ==
The event set for two headlined, first headlined by a flyweight muay thai bout between Chorfah Tor.Sangtiennoi vs. Sherzod Kabutov, second headlined by a flyweight muay thai bout between Yodkrisada Sor.Sommai vs. Thepthaksin Sor.Sornsing.

At the weigh-ins, Sherzod Kabutov weighed in at 136.6 pounds, 1.6 pounds over the flyweight limit. The bout proceeded at catchweight with Kabutov was fined their purse of his purse, which went to his opponent Chorfah Tor.Sangtiennoi.

== Results ==
Main card (YouTube / Facebook)
Weight class				Method	Round	Time	Notes
Catchweight (132 lbs) Muay Thai	Thepthaksin Sor.Sornsing	def.	Yodkrisada Sor.Sommai	Decision (unanimous)	3	3:00
Bantamweight Muay Thai	Panrit Lookjaomaesaiwaree	def.	Paedsanlek P.K.Saenchai	Decision (unanimous)	3	3:00
Catchweight (116 lbs) Muay Thai	Rak Erawan	def.	Chusap Sor.Salacheep	TKO (punches)	1	1:12
Strawweight Muay Thai	Teeyai P.K.Saenchai	def.	Manolis Kallistis	Decision (unanimous)	3	3:00
Flyweight Muay Thai	Superlek Jitmuangnon	def.	Sonrak Sit Por.Jor.Wor.	Decision (unanimous)	3	3:00
Catchweight (118 lbs) Muay Thai	Thongpoon P.K.Saenchai	def.	Tomorrow Kiatsongrit	TKO (punches)	1	0:24
Preliminary card (FanDuel TV)
Catchweight (136.6 lbs) Muay Thai	Chorfah Tor.Sangtiennoi	def.	Sherzod Kabutov	Decision (split)	3	3:00	(Note: Originally a flyweight bout; Kabutov missed weight (136.6 lbs).)
Bantamweight Muay Thai	Yod-IQ P.K.Saenchai	def.	Samuel Bielen	TKO (elbow)	2	0:38
Bantamweight	Ivan Parshikov	def.	Yu Karino	Submission (kneebar)	1	0:50
Catchweight (160 lbs) Muay Thai	Anton Petrov	def.	Luca Lombardo	TKO (cut)	1	2:23
Bantamweight Muay Thai	Shingo Shibata	def.	Petklangna Sitphuyainiran	Decision (split)	3	3:00

== Bonus awards ==
The following fighters received $10,000 bonuses.

- Performance of the Night: Thepthaksin Sor.Sornsing, Rak Erawan, Thongpoon P.K.Saenchai and Yod-IQ P.K.Saenchai

== See also ==
- 2023 in ONE Championship
- List of ONE Championship events
- List of current ONE fighters
