= Lamnamoonlek Or.Atchariya =

Thai Muay Thai fighter and amateur boxer

Lamnamoonlek Tded99
- Born: Nattapon Saenkla; April 13, 1998 (age 28)
- Other names: Lamnamoonlek Or.Achariya (ลำน้ำมูลเล็ก อ.อัจฉริยะ); Lamnamoonlek Nuikafeboran (ลำน้ำมูลเล็ก หนุ่ยกาแฟโบราณ); Lamnamoonlek Sakchaichot (ลำน้ำมูลเล็ก ศักดิ์ชัยโชติ)
- Height: 169 cm (5 ft 7 in)
- Division: Super Featherweight; Lightweight
- Style: Muay Thai (Muay Femur)
- Stance: Southpaw
- Fighting out of: Bangkok, Thailand
- Team: Tded99 วันของโอมMBK
- Years active: c. 2005-present

Kickboxing record
- Total: 140
- Wins: 107
- Losses: 31
- Draws: 2

Nattapon Saenkla (born April 13, 1998), known professionally as Lamnamoonlek Tded99 (Thai: ลำน้ำมูลเล็ก ทีเด็ด99), is a Thai professional Muay Thai fighter and amateur boxer. He is a two-time Rajadamnern World Series Lightweight Tournament Champion which he won in 2022 and 2023. He was the 2021 Sports Authority of Thailand Fighter of the Year.

As of October 2024, he is ranked #1 and #7 at Lightweight in Muay Thai by the WMO and Combat Press, respectively.

== Biography and career ==
Lamnamoonlek started Muay Thai at the age of seven inspired by his older brothers Lamnamoon Sakchaichot and Lamnamkhong Sakchaichot. He trained at the Sakchaichot camp for eight years before moving to Teeded99.

On September 28, 2019 Lamnamoonlek faced Chorfah Tor.Sangtiennoi for the OneSongchai S-1 Super Featherweight title. Lamnamoonlek won by decision.

On September 16, 2020 he defeated Extra Sit.Worapat by decision at Rajadamnern Stadium. This fight would be the beginning of an extensive winning streak. On October 22, 2020 Lamanamoonlek faced for the fifth time the most recent Sports Authority of Thailand Fighter of the Year Kiewpayak Jitmuangnon at Rajadamnern Stadium. He won by third round knockout.

On February 28, 2021 Lamanamoonlek faced the reigning 126 lbs Thailand champion Phetphuthai Sitsarawatseua at the channel 7 stadium and defeated him by decision.

On September 22, 2021 at Lumpinee Stadium, Lamnamoonlek faced Duangsompong Jitmuangnon who was on a three fights win streak and just defeated Petchdam PetchyindeeAcademy. Lamnamoonlek won by decision.

On November 26, 2021 Lamanamoonlek faced Mathias Gallo Cassarino in a weight handicap fight at Lumpinee stadium. Lamnamoonlek won by unanimous decision.

As of October 2021 he was ranked the #1 Lightweight contender in the world by the World Boxing Council Muaythai.

For his results during the year 2021 Lamnamoonlek was elected Fighter of the Year by the Sports Authority of Thailand.

On February 27, 2022 Lamanamoonlek had his first international fighting experience when he faced Gusein Tagirovich Aliev at MuayThai Night in Dubai for the vacant WMC World Lightweight title. Lamnamoonlek won the fight by unanimous decision.

== Titles and accomplishments ==
=== Muay Thai ===
- Onesongchai
  - 2019 S-1 Super Featherweight (130 lbs) Champion
- World Muay Thai Council
  - 2022 WMC World Lightweight (135 lbs) Champion
- Rajadamnern Stadium
  - 2022 Rajadamnern World Series Lightweight (135 lbs) Tournament Winner
  - 2023 Rajadamnern World Series Lightweight (135 lbs) Tournament Winner
  - 2023 Rajadamnern Stadium Fighter of the Year

Awards

- 2021 Sports Authority of Thailand Fighter of the Year

=== Amateur boxing ===
- 2024 Thailand National Championship Welterweight (gold)

== Fight record ==
Muay Thai Record
107 Wins (7 (T)KOs), 31 Losses, 2 Draws
Date	Result	Opponent	Event	Location	Method	Round	Time
2026-12-04		(Thailand) Panpayak Jitmuangnon	ONE The Inner Circle 41, Lumpinee Stadium	Bangkok, Thailand			
2026-09-25	Win	(Thailand) Panpayak Jitmuangnon	ONE The Inner Circle 32, Lumpinee Stadium	Bangkok, Thailand	Decision (Split)	3	3:00
2026-03-27	Loss	(China) Yuan Pengjie	ONE Friday Fights 148, Lumpinee Stadium	Bangkok, Thailand	Decision (Unanimous)	3	3:00
2026-02-06	Win	(Spain) Daniel Puertas	ONE Friday Fights 141, Lumpinee Stadium	Bangkok, Thailand	Decision (Unanimous)	3	3:00
2025-11-28	Win	(Spain) Javier Gálvez	ONE Friday Fights 135, Lumpinee Stadium	Bangkok, Thailand	Decision (Unanimous)	3	3:00
2025-04-18	Win	(Thailand) Kongsuk Fairtex	ONE Friday Fights 105, Lumpinee Stadium	Bangkok, Thailand	Decision (Unanimous)	3	3:00
2025-02-14	Loss	(Thailand) Kongsuk Fairtex	ONE Friday Fights 97, Lumpinee Stadium	Bangkok, Thailand	Decision (Split)	3	3:00
2024-11-26	Win	(Thailand) Flukenoi Kiatfahlikit	Petchyindee x PRYDE TV, Rangsit Stadium	Bangkok, Thailand	Decision	5	3:00
2024-10-10	Win	(Thailand) Samingdet Nor.Anuwatgym	Petchyindee x PRYDE TV, Rajadamnern Stadium	Bangkok, Thailand	Decision	5	3:00
2024-05-12	Loss	(Cambodia) Lorn Panha	Krud Kun Khmer	Cambodia	Decision (split)	5	3:00
2024-02-12	Win	(Japan) Renta Wor.Wanchai	Rajadamnern World Series Japan	Tokyo, Japan	Decision (Unanimous)	3	3:00
2023-12-23	Win	(Myanmar) Saw Ae Shee Sor.Jitnongchart	Rajadamnern World Series	Bangkok, Thailand	Decision (Unanimous)	3	3:00
2023-09-30	Win	(Thailand) Samingdet Nor.Anuwatgym	Rajadamnern World Series - Final	Bangkok, Thailand	Decision (Unanimous)	5	3:00
Wins the 2023 Rajadamnern World Series Lightweight (135 lbs) tournament title.
2023-08-26	Win	(Thailand) Buakhiao Por.Paoin	Rajadamnern World Series - Final 4	Bangkok, Thailand	Decision (Unanimous)	3	3:00
2023-07-22	Win	(Japan) Renta Wor.Wanchai	Rajadamnern World Series - Group Stage	Bangkok, Thailand	Decision (Unanimous)	3	3:00
2023-06-17	Win	(Thailand) Samingdet Nor.Anuwatgym	Rajadamnern World Series - Group Stage	Bangkok, Thailand	Decision (Unanimous)	3	3:00
2023-05-13	Win	(Morocco) Diae Bezhad Warrior Academy	Rajadamnern World Series - Group Stage	Bangkok, Thailand	Decision (Unanimous)	3	3:00
2023-03-25	Win	(Iran) Sobie FamilyMuayThai	RWS + Palangmai, Rajadamnern Stadium	Bangkok, Thailand	KO (Low kicks)	1	1:32
2023-02-12	Loss	(Japan) Hiroki Kasahara	SHOOT BOXING 2023 act.1	Tokyo, Japan	3rd Ext.R Decision (Unanimous)	6	3:00
2022-12-23	Win	(Thailand) Mongkolkaew Sor.Sommai	Rajadamnern World Series - Final	Bangkok, Thailand	Decision (Unanimous)	5	3:00
Wins the 2022 Rajadamnern World Series Lightweight (135 lbs) tournament title.
2022-11-25	Win	(Thailand) Extra Rongsamuk Or.Bor.JorUdon	Rajadamnern World Series - Semi Final	Bangkok, Thailand	Decision (Unanimous)	3	3:00
2022-10-21	Win	(Morocco) Hicham Boulahri	Rajadamnern World Series - Group Stage	Bangkok, Thailand	KO	1	
2022-09-16	Win	(Thailand) Buakiew Por.Paoin	Rajadamnern World Series - Group Stage	Bangkok, Thailand	Decision (Unanimous)	3	3:00
2022-06-20	Loss	(Thailand) Flukenoi Kiatfahlikit	U-Muay RuamJaiKonRakMuayThai + Palangmai, Rajadamnern Stadium	Bangkok, Thailand	Decision	5	3:00
2022-04-16	Draw	(Thailand) Sangmanee Sor.KafaeMuayThai	Pitaktham + Sor.Sommai	Phayao province, Thailand	Decision	5	3:00
2022-02-27	Win	(Russia) Gusein Aliev	Muaythai Night	Dubai, UAE	Decision (Unanimous)	5	3:00
Wins the vacant WMC World Lightweight (135 lbs) title.
2021-12-30	Win	(Thailand) Duangsompong Jitmuangnon	Muay Thai SAT Super Fight WiteetinThai	Phuket, Thailand	Decision	5	3:00
2021-11-26	Win	(Italy) Mathias Gallo Cassarino	GoSport + Kiatpetch, Lumpinee Stadium	Bangkok, Thailand	Decision (Unanimous)	5	3:00
2021-09-22	Win	(Thailand) Duangsompong Jitmuangnon	Chef Boontham, Lumpinee Stadium	Bangkok, Thailand	Decision	5	3:00
2021-02-28	Win	(Thailand) Phetphuthai Sitsarawatseua	Channel 7 Stadium	Bangkok, Thailand	Decision (Majority)	5	3:00
2020-10-22	Win	(Thailand) Kiewpayak Jitmuangnon	Petchpatchara, Rajadamnern Stadium	Bangkok, Thailand	KO (Left Cross)	3	
2020-09-16	Win	(Thailand) Extra Sit.Worapat	Petchchaopraya, Rajadamnern Stadium	Bangkok, Thailand	Decision	5	3:00
2020-08-01	Loss	(Thailand) Kiewpayak Jitmuangnon	SuekJaoMuayThai, Siam Omnoi Stadium	Bangkok, Thailand	Decision (Split)	5	3:00
2020-02-28	Win	(Thailand) Kiewpayak Jitmuangnon	Ruamponkonchon Pratan Super Fight	Pathum Thani, Thailand	Decision	5	3:00
2019-12-23	Loss	(Thailand) Mongkolkaew Sor.Sommai	Chef Boontham, Lumpinee Stadium	Bangkok, Thailand	Decision	5	3:00
2019-11-20	Win	(Thailand) Yodtongthai Sor.Sommai	Petchchaopraya, Rajadamnern Stadium	Bangkok, Thailand	Decision	5	3:00
2019-09-28	Win	(Thailand) Chorfah Tor.Sangtiennoi	Yodmuay Onesongchai, Royal Thai Air Force Sports Stadium	Pathum Thani, Thailand	Decision	5	3:00
Wins the S-1 Super Featherweight title.
2019-08-22	Win	(Thailand) Mongkolkaew Sor.Sommai	Sor.Sommai, Rajadamnern Stadium	Bangkok, Thailand	Decision	5	3:00
2019-07-09	Win	(Thailand) Mongkolkaew Sor.Sommai	Por Pattara + Tded99, Lumpinee Stadium	Bangkok, Thailand	Decision	5	3:00
2019-05-29	Loss	(Thailand) Kiewpayak Jitmuangnon	Rajadamnern Stadium	Bangkok, Thailand	Decision	5	3:00
2019-04-25	Win	(Thailand) Yodkitsada Yuthachonburi	Sor.Sommai, Rajadamnern Stadium	Bangkok, Thailand	Decision	5	3:00
2019-03-14	Loss	(Thailand) Mongkolkaew Sor.Sommai	Sor.Sommai, Rajadamnern Stadium	Bangkok, Thailand	Decision	5	3:00
2019-01-10	Win	(Thailand) Mongkolchai Kwaitonggym	Sor.Sommai, Rajadamnern Stadium	Bangkok, Thailand	Decision	5	3:00
2018-12-12	Win	(Thailand) Chanasuk Kor.Kampanat	Petchchaopraya, Rajadamnern Stadium	Bangkok, Thailand	Decision	5	3:00
2018-09-27	Loss	(Thailand) Chankrit Or.Pimonsri	Sor.Sommai Rajadamnern Stadium	Bangkok, Thailand	Decision	5	3:00
2018-07-19	Win	(Thailand) Dechsakda Sitsongpeenong	Sor.Sommai, Rajadamnern Stadium	Bangkok, Thailand	Decision	5	3:00
2018-06-28	Win	(Thailand) Chanasuk Kor.Kampanat	Sor.Sommai, Rajadamnern Stadium	Bangkok, Thailand	Decision	5	3:00
2018-05-17	Win	(Thailand) Dechsakda Sitsongpeenong	Sor.Sommai, Rajadamnern Stadium	Bangkok, Thailand	Decision	5	3:00
2018-04-13	Win	(Thailand) Chanasuk Kor.Kampanat		Thailand	Decision	5	3:00
2018-02-22	Loss	(Thailand) Kiewpayak Jitmuangnon	Rajadamnern Stadium	Bangkok, Thailand	Decision	5	3:00
2018-01-12	Win	(Thailand) Chorfah Tor.Sangtiennoi	Lumpinee Stadium	Bangkok, Thailand	Decision	5	3:00
2017-11-27	Win	(Thailand) Yodkitsada Yuthachonburi	Petchchaopraya, Rajadamnern Stadium	Bangkok, Thailand	Decision	5	3:00
2017-09-13	Win	(Thailand) Komkiat Sor.Salachip	Sor.Sommai, Rajadamnern Stadium	Bangkok, Thailand	Decision	5	3:00
2017-07-27	Win	(Thailand) Yodkhunsuk Mor.RajahbatChombung	Sor.Sommai, Rajadamnern Stadium	Bangkok, Thailand	Decision	5	3:00
2017-07-03	Win	(Thailand) Yodkitsada Yuthachonburi	Bangrachan, Rajadamnern Stadium	Bangkok, Thailand	Decision	5	3:00
2017-06-12	Loss	(Thailand) Chankrit Or.Pimonsri	Bangrachan, Rajadamnern Stadium	Bangkok, Thailand	Decision	5	3:00
2017-05-18	Win	(Thailand) Yardfah R.Airline	Bangrachan, Rajadamnern Stadium	Bangkok, Thailand	Decision	5	3:00
2017-02-22	Loss	(Thailand) Metee Sor.Jor.Toipaedriew	Tor.Chaiwat, Rajadamnern Stadium	Bangkok, Thailand	Decision	5	3:00
2017-01-15	Loss	(Thailand) Sprinter Pangkongprab	Rangsit Stadium	Rangsit, Thailand	Decision	5	3:00
2016-12-17	Win	(Thailand) Sanphet Numsaengkorsang	Thanakorn Stadium	Thailand	Decision	5	3:00
2016-09-21	Win	(Thailand) Phadetsuk Kor.Kampanat	Petchwittaya, Rajadamnern Stadium	Bangkok, Thailand	Decision	5	3:00
2016-04-30	Win	(Thailand) Phetkriangkrai Tor.Silachai	Yod Muay Thairath TV, Thanakorn Stadium	Thailand	Decision	5	3:00
2016-03-03	Loss	(Thailand) Phadetsuk Kor.Kampanat	OneSongchai, Rajadamnern Stadium	Bangkok, Thailand	Decision	5	3:00
2016-02-06	Win	(Thailand) Phadetsuk Kor.Kampanat	Yod Muay Thairath TV, Thanakorn Stadium	Thailand	Decision	5	3:00
2016-01-16	Win	(Thailand) Phadetsuk Kor.Kampanat	Yod Muay Thairath TV, Thanakorn Stadium	Thailand	Decision	5	3:00
2015-11-27	Loss	(Thailand) Petcharat Wor.Wiwattananon	Bangrachan, Rajadamnern Stadium	Bangkok, Thailand	Decision	5	3:00
2015-11-19	Loss	(Thailand) Pichitchai P.K.Saenchaimuaythaigym	Bangrachan, Rajadamnern Stadium	Bangkok, Thailand	Decision	5	3:00
2015-10-17	Win	(Thailand) Fonpad Chuwattana	Yod Muay Thairath TV, Thanakorn Stadium	Thailand	Decision	5	3:00
2015-09-23	Draw	(Thailand) Fonpad Chuwattana	Rajadamnern Stadium	Bangkok, Thailand	Decision	5	3:00
2015-08-23	Win	(Thailand) Thanai-K Lukkaokwang	OneSongchai, Rajadamnern Stadium	Bangkok, Thailand	Decision	5	3:00
2015-07-10	Win	(Thailand) Kundiew Payabkhamphan	Lumpinee Stadium	Bangkok, Thailand	Decision	5	3:00
2015-05-15	Win	(Thailand) Nongbeer PhayakMuangChon	Lumpinee Stadium	Bangkok, Thailand	Decision	5	3:00
2015-04-06	Loss	(Thailand) Pichitchai P.K.Saenchaimuaythaigym	Rajadamnern Stadium	Bangkok, Thailand	KO	3	
2015-02-25	Loss	(Thailand) Nichao SuwitGym	Rajadamnern Stadium	Bangkok, Thailand	Decision	5	3:00
2015-01-23	Win	(Thailand) Chuponglek Or.KamPhi	Lumpinee Stadium	Bangkok, Thailand	Decision	5	3:00
2014-09-20	Loss	(Thailand) Puenkon Tor.Surat	Omnoi Stadium	Bangkok, Thailand	Decision	5	3:00
2014-07-24	Win	(Thailand) Roicheing Choinathawi	Chaopraya, Rajadamnern Stadium	Bangkok, Thailand	Decision	5	3:00
Legend: Win Loss Draw/No contest Notes
