= Kiewpayak Jitmuangnon =

Thai professional Muay Thai fighter

- Born: July 8, 1998 (age 28)
- Height: 173 cm (5 ft 8 in)
- Division: Flyweight; Super Flyweight; Bantamweight; Super Bantamweight; Featherweight; Super Featherweight
- Style: Muay Thai (Muay Femur)
- Stance: Orthodox
- Fighting out of: Bangkok, Thailand
- Team: Jitmuangnon

Kickboxing record
- Total: 142
- Wins: 117
- Losses: 25

Other information
- Occupation: Muay Thai trainer
- Notable relatives: Panpayak Jitmuangnon (brother)

Kiewpayak Jitmuangnon (Thai: เขี้ยวพยัคฆ์ จิตรเมืองนนท์) is a Thai professional Muay Thai fighter.

He has a right-handed (orthodox) fighting style.

== Titles and accomplishments ==
- Lumpinee Stadium
  - 2016 Lumpinee Stadium Flyweight (112 lbs) Champion
- Awards
  - 2019 Sports Authority of Thailand Fighter of the Year

== Fight record ==
Muay Thai Record
119 Wins, 25 Losses
Date	Result	Opponent	Event	Location	Method	Round	Time
2026-10-17	Loss	(Thailand) Samingdet Nor.Anuwatgym	Rajadamnern World Series, Rajadamnern Stadium	Bangkok, Thailand	Decision (Split)	5	3:00
For the interim Rajadamnern Stadium Lightweight (135 lbs) title.
2026-07-04	Win	(China) Jiang Ronglong	Rajadamnern World Series	Bangkok, Thailand	KO (Knee to the body)	2	2:04
2025-12-13	Win	(Thailand) Yodtongthai Sor.Sommai	Rajadamnern World Series	Bangkok, Thailand	Decision (Split)	3	3:00
2025-06-14	Win	(Thailand) Thongnoi Lukbanyai	Rajadamnern World Series	Bangkok, Thailand	Decision (Unanimous)	3	3:00
2025-01-03	Win	(Italy) Luca Santini	Rajadamnern World Series	Bangkok, Thailand	Decision (Unanimous)	3	3:00
2024-12-28	Win	(Egypt) Ali Kinanah	Rajadamnern World Series, Rajadamnern Stadium	Bangkok, Thailand	Decision (Unanimous)	3	3:00
2024-10-12	Loss	(Thailand) Yodpt Petchrungruang	WBC Amazing Muay Thai Fight Night	Verona, Italy	KO (Left hook)	4	0:16
For the vacant WBC MuayThai World Super Featherweight (130 lbs) title.
2022-02-13	Loss	(Thailand) Kanongsuek Gor.Kampanat	Muaydee VitheeThai + Jitmuangnon, Or.Tor.Gor.3 Stadium	Nonthaburi province, Thailand	Decision	5	3:00
2021-12-10	Win	(Thailand) Nabil VenumMuayThai	Muaymanwsuk, Rangsit Stadium	Rangsit, Thailand	Decision	5	3:00
2021-10-14	Win	(Thailand) Kompatak SinbiMuayThai	Petchyindee + Muay Thai Moradok Kon Thai	Buriram Province, Thailand	Decision	5	3:00
2021-04-09	Loss	(Thailand) Kompatak SinbiMuayThai	Muaymanwansuk Road Show	Songkhla, Thailand	Decision	5	3:00
2020-12-05	Win	(Thailand) Kanongsuk Gor.Kampanat	Jitmuangnon + Sor.CafeMuayThai, Or.Tor.Gor3 Stadium	Nonthaburi province, Thailand	Decision	5	3:00
2020-10-22	Loss	(Thailand) Lamnamoonlek Or.Atchariya	Petchpatchara, Rajadamnern Stadium	Bangkok, Thailand	KO (Left Cross)	3	
2020-09-03	Loss	(Thailand) Chorfah Tor.Sangtiennoi	Rajadamnern Stadium	Bangkok, Thailand	KO (Right cross)	3	
2020-08-01	Win	(Thailand) Lamnamoonlek Or.Atchariya	SuekJaoMuayThai, Siam Omnoi Stadium	Bangkok, Thailand	Decision (Split)	5	3:00
2020-02-28	Loss	(Thailand) Lamnamoonlek Or.Atchariya	Ruamponkonchon Pratan Super Fight	Pathum Thani, Thailand	Decision	5	3:00
2019-12-04	Win	(Thailand) Kongthoranee Sor.Sommai	Rajadamnern Stadium	Bangkok, Thailand	Decision (Unanimous)	5	3:00
2019-10-05	Win	(Thailand) Chalam Parunchai	Suek Muay Thai Vithee Isaan Tai	Buriram, Thailand	Decision	5	3:00
2019-09-12	NC	(Thailand) Chanasuek Kor.Kompanat	Rajadamnern Stadium	Bangkok, Thailand		2	
2019-08-07	Win	(Thailand) Kompatak SinbiMuayThai	Rajadamnern Stadium	Bangkok, Thailand	Decision	5	3:00
2019-06-26	Win	(Thailand) Chalam Parunchai	RuamponkonSamui + Kiatpetch Super Fight	Surat Thani Province, Thailand	KO (Left elbow)	3	
2019-05-29	Win	(Thailand) Lamnamoonlek Or.Atchariya	Rajadamnern Stadium	Bangkok, Thailand	Decision	5	3:00
2019-02-28	Win	(Thailand) Kompatak SinbiMuayThai	Rajadamnern Stadium	Bangkok, Thailand	Decision	5	3:00
2019-01-31	Win	(Thailand) Suriyanlek Aor.Bor.Tor. Kampee	Rajadamnern Stadium	Bangkok, Thailand	Decision	5	3:00
2018-12-06	Loss	(Thailand) Chorfah Tor.Sangtiennoi	Rajadamnern Stadium	Bangkok, Thailand	KO (Right cross)	3	
2018-11-01	Win	(Thailand) Yothin FA Group	Rajadamnern Stadium	Bangkok, Thailand	Decision	5	3:00
2018-09-20	Win	(Thailand) Luknimit Singklongsi	Rajadamnern Stadium	Bangkok, Thailand	Decision	5	3:00
2018-05-30	Win	(Thailand) Morakot Petchsimuen	Rajadamnern Stadium	Bangkok, Thailand	Decision	5	3:00
2018-04-09	Win	(Thailand) Yothin FA Group	Rajadamnern Stadium	Bangkok, Thailand	Decision	5	3:00
2018-02-22	Win	(Thailand) Lamnamoonlek Or.Atchariya	Rajadamnern Stadium	Bangkok, Thailand	Decision	5	3:00
2018-01-31	Loss	(Thailand) Rungkit Wor.Sanprapai	Rajadamnern Stadium	Bangkok, Thailand	Decision	5	3:00
2017-12-27	Win	(Thailand) Somraknoi Muay789	Rajadamnern Stadium	Bangkok, Thailand	Decision	5	3:00
2017-11-01	Win	(Thailand) Somraknoi Muay789	Rajadamnern Stadium	Bangkok, Thailand	Decision	5	3:00
2017-08-03	Loss	(Thailand) Prajanchai P.K.Saenchaimuaythaigym	Rajadamnern Stadium	Bangkok, Thailand	Decision	5	3:00
2017-06-11	Win	(Thailand) Prajanban Sor.Jor.Vichitpadriew	Rangsit Stadium	Rangsit, Thailand	Decision	5	3:00
2017-05-04	Win	(Thailand) Yothin FA Group	Rajadamnern Stadium	Bangkok, Thailand	Decision	5	3:00
2017-03-15	Loss	(Thailand) Yothin FA Group	Rajadamnern Stadium	Bangkok, Thailand	Decision	5	3:00
2017-02-07	Loss	(Thailand) Yothin FA Group	Lumpinee Stadium	Bangkok, Thailand	Decision	5	3:00
2016-12-12	Win	(Thailand) Palangpon PetchyindeeAcademy	Rajadamnern Stadium	Bangkok, Thailand	Decision	5	3:00
2016-11-14	Loss	(Thailand) Palangpon PetchyindeeAcademy	Rajadamnern Stadium	Bangkok, Thailand	Decision	5	3:00
2016-09-28	Win	(Thailand) Watcharaphon P.K.Senchai	Rajadamnern Stadium	Bangkok, Thailand	Decision	5	3:00
2016-09-02	Win	(Thailand) Ronachai Tor.Ramintra	Lumpinee Stadium	Bangkok, Thailand	Decision	5	3:00
Wins the Lumpinee Stadium Flyweight (112 lbs) title.
2016-08-02	Draw	(Thailand) Petchrung Sitnayokkaipadriew	Lumpinee Stadium	Bangkok, Thailand	Decision	5	3:00
2016-07-06	Win	(Thailand) Wanchai Kiatmuu9	Rajadamnern Stadium	Bangkok, Thailand	Decision	5	3:00
2016-05-26	Loss	(Thailand) Phetmuangchon Por.Suantong	Rajadamnern Stadium	Bangkok, Thailand	Decision	5	3:00
2016-05-02	Loss	(Thailand) Ronachai Tor.Ramintra	Rajadamnern Stadium	Bangkok, Thailand	Decision	5	3:00
2016-03-29	Loss	(Thailand) Ronachai Tor.Ramintra	Lumpinee Stadium	Bangkok, Thailand	Decision	5	3:00
2016-03-02	Win	(Thailand) Ronachai Tor.Ramintra	Rajadamnern Stadium	Bangkok, Thailand	Decision	5	3:00
2016-01-26	Win	(Thailand) Banlangngoen Sawansrangmunja	Lumpinee Stadium	Bangkok, Thailand	Decision	5	3:00
2015-12-22	Loss	(Thailand) Banlangngoen Sawansrangmunja	Lumpinee Stadium	Bangkok, Thailand	Decision	5	3:00
2015-11-03	Win	(Thailand) Petchrung Sitnayokkaipadriew	Lumpinee Stadium	Bangkok, Thailand	Decision	5	3:00
2015-09-11	Win	(Thailand) KoKo Paemeanburi	Lumpinee Stadium	Bangkok, Thailand	Decision	5	3:00
2015-08-03	Loss	(Thailand) Chaiyo PetchyindeeAcademy	Rajadamnern Stadium	Bangkok, Thailand	Decision	5	3:00
2015-07-10	Win	(Thailand) Phetpangan Mor.Ratanabandit	Lumpinee Stadium	Bangkok, Thailand	Decision	5	3:00
2015-05-20	Win	(Thailand) Nengern Lukjaomaesaivari	Rajadamnern Stadium	Bangkok, Thailand	Decision	5	3:00
2015-04-07	Loss	(Thailand) Chaiyo PetchyindeeAcademy	Lumpinee Stadium	Bangkok, Thailand	Decision	5	3:00
2015-03-06	Win	(Thailand) Chaiyo PetchyindeeAcademy	Lumpinee Stadium	Bangkok, Thailand	Decision	5	3:00
2015-01-15	Win	(Thailand) Raktukkon RajahbatUniversity	Rajadamnern Stadium	Bangkok, Thailand	Decision	5	3:00
2014-11-24	Win	(Thailand) Phetpanang Sor.Suradet	Rajadamnern Stadium	Bangkok, Thailand	Decision	5	3:00
2014-09-11	Loss	(Thailand) Kongthoranee Sor.Sommai	Rajadamnern Stadium	Bangkok, Thailand	Decision	5	3:00
2014-06-26	Loss	(Thailand) Kongthoranee Sor.Sommai	Rajadamnern Stadium	Bangkok, Thailand	Decision	5	3:00
Legend: Win Loss Draw/No contest Notes
