= Phetphuthai Sitsarawatseua =

Thai Muay Thai fighter

- Born: Ittipon Porgket; June 14, 2002 (age 24); Bang Na, Bangkok, Thailand
- Other names: Petchphuthai OrBorJor.NakhonPhanom
- Height: 177 cm (5 ft 10 in)
- Weight: 63.5 kg (140 lb; 10.00 st)
- Stance: Orthodox
- Team: Kiatpetch Gym

Kickboxing record
- Total: 177
- Wins: 140
- Losses: 36
- Draws: 1

Phetphutai Sitsarawatseua (เพชรภูไท ศิษย์สารวัตรเสือ) is a Thai Muay Thai fighter. He currently trains out of Petchkiatpetch Gym alongside View Petchkoson. He formerly trained at Sitsarawatseua gym in Samut Prakan alongside Kompetch, Wanchainoi, and Kongsuk Sitsarawatseua.

== Biography ==
Phetphuthai's parents are ethnic Phu Thai from Nakhon Phanom, though Phetphutai himself was born and raised in the Bang Na District of Bangkok.

He started boxing in kindergarten, inspired by his father who was a former boxer, and who would be Phetphuthai's first trainer. As life was very tough for his family, he would help his parents sell grilled squid everyday after practice.

His first fight was when he was still in kindergarten, Phetphuthai was knocked out. At 13 years old, while still under his father's guidance, he won his first fight at the famed Rajadamnern Stadium by decision (84 lbs).

In 2016, when he was 14 years old, Petphuthai was contacted by Sia Phairot Punpho of Sitsarawatseua gym, and he has been training there under Kru Gai ever since. In that same year, he had his tonsils removed due to the breathing difficulties they caused. This would stop him from eating normally for a month, which in turn made his return-to-form very long.

At only 18 years old, Phetphuthai won the Lumpinee Stadium, Channel 7 Stadium, and Thailand titles in three different weight classes.

In 2023, as his camp-mates Kompetch, Wanchainoi, and Krobsut's contracts were bought by Fairtex Gym in Pattaya, Phetphuthai bought out his own contract and joined Kiatpetch Gym so that he could stay close to his family.

== Titles and accomplishments ==
- Rajadamnern Stadium
  - 2024 interim Rajadamnern Stadium Super Lightweight (140 lbs) Champion
- Professional Boxing Association of Thailand (PAT)
  - 2020 Thailand 126 lbs Champion
- Channel 7 Stadium
  - 2019 Channel 7 Stadium 122 lbs Champion
- Lumpinee Stadium
  - 2017 Lumpinee Stadium 108 lbs Champion

== Fight record ==
Muay Thai Record
140 Wins , 38 Losses , 2 Draws
Date	Result	Opponent	Event	Location	Method	Round	Time
2025-08-02	Loss	(United Kingdom) Anthony Deary	MTGP 97 Fight Night Liverpool	Liverpool, England	KO (Elbow)	1	
For the vacant WBC Muay Thai World Super Lightweight (140 lbs) title
2025-06-08	Draw	(Italy) Alessandro Sara	Channel 7 Stadium	Bangkok, Thailand	Decision	5	3:00
2025-03-15	Loss	(Thailand) Dam Parunchai	Rajadamnern World Series, Rajadamnern Stadium	Bangkok, Thailand	KO (Elbow)	3	
For the undisputed Rajadamnern Stadium Super Lightweight (140 lbs) title.
2025-01-04	Win	(Thailand) Rungkit Bor.Rungrot	Rajadamnern World Series, Rajadamnern Stadium	Bangkok, Thailand	KO (Elbow)	2	
Defends the interim Rajadamnern Stadium Super Lightweight (140 lbs) title.
2024-11-23	Win	(Thailand) Moradokpetch Muayded789	Rajadamnern World Series, Rajadamnern Stadium	Bangkok, Thailand	Decision (Unanimous)	5	3:00
Wins the interim Rajadamnern Stadium Super Lightweight (140 lbs) title.
2024-10-13	Win	(Thailand) Flukenoi Kiatfahlikit	Channel 7 Stadium	Bangkok, Thailand	Decision	5	3:00
2024-08-25	Win	(Thailand) YodET PorTorTor.Thongtawee	Channel 7 Stadium	Bangkok, Thailand	Decision	5	3:00
2023-07-14	Loss	(Thailand) Nakrob Fairtex	ONE Friday Fights 25, Lumpinee Stadium	Bangkok, Thailand	KO (right elbow)	2	1:28
2023-03-18	Win	(Iran) Abdollah Venummuaythai	Rajadamnern World Series, Rajadamnern Stadium	Bangkok, Thailand	Decision (Unanimous)	3	3:00
2023-02-18	Win	(Thailand) Sakulchailek Pangkongpap	Suk Rom Pon Khon Samui	Samui, Thailand	KO	4	
2022-12-19	Win	(Thailand) Rungsaengtawan Sor.Parat	Nakhon Phanom Super Fight + Chang Muay Thai Kiatpetch	Nakhon Phanom province, Thailand	Decision	5	3:00
2021-02-28	Loss	(Thailand) Lamnamoonlek Tded99	Channel 7 Stadium	Bangkok, Thailand	Decision (majority)	5	3:00
2020-09-20	Win	(Thailand) Phetrung Sitnayokkaipradiew	Or.Tor.Gor.3 Stadium	Nonthaburi, Thailand	KO (right elbow)	3	
Wins vacant Thailand 126 lbs title
2020-08-23	Win	(Thailand) Messi Pangkongprab	Or.Tor.Gor.3 Stadium	Nonthaburi, Thailand	KO (right elbow)	4	
2020-03-06	Win	(Thailand) Worawut MU.Den	Lumpinee Stadium	Bangkok, Thailand	KO (left elbow)	3	
2020-02-04	Win	(Thailand) Dieselnoi Sor.Damnern	Lumpinee Stadium	Bangkok, Thailand	Decision	5	3:00
2019-12-06	Win	(Thailand) Phetrung Sitnayokkaipradiew	Lumpinee Stadium	Bangkok, Thailand	Decision	5	3:00
2019-09-26	Loss	(Thailand) Khunsuknoi SItkaewprapon	Rajadamnern Stadium	Bangkok, Thailand	Decision	5	3:00
2019-08-04	Loss	(Thailand) Dieselnoi Sor.Damnern	Or.Tor.Gor.3 Stadium	Nonthaburi, Thailand	Decision	5	3:00
2019-03-23	Win	(Thailand) Phet Sawansangmancha	Channel 7 Stadium	Bangkok, Thailand	Decision	5	3:00
Wins Channel 7 Stadium 122 lbs title
2019-02-17	Win	(Thailand) Kongsak Sor.Satta	Lumpinee Stadium	Bangkok, Thailand	Decision	5	3:00
2018-12-07	Win	(Thailand) Saifon Ratanaphu	Lumpinee Stadium	Bangkok, Thailand	Decision	5	3:00
2018-11-09	Loss	(Thailand) Pompetch Sitnumnoi	Lumpinee Stadium	Bangkok, Thailand	Decision	5	3:00
2018-10-02	Win	(Thailand) Peemai Erawan	Lumpinee Stadium	Bangkok, Thailand	Decision	5	3:00
2018-09-04	Draw	(Thailand) Rungnarai Kiatmuu9	Lumpinee Stadium	Bangkok, Thailand	Decision	5	3:00
2018-08-07	Win	(Thailand) Phetpailin Sitnumnoi	Lumpinee Stadium	Bangkok, Thailand	Decision	5	3:00
2018-06-05	Win	(Thailand) Patakphet Sinbeemuaythai	Lumpinee Stadium	Bangkok, Thailand	Decision	5	3:00
2018-02-06	Win	(Thailand) Nengern P.K.Saenchaimuaythaigym	Rajadamnern Stadium	Bangkok, Thailand	Decision	5	3:00
2017-12-26	Loss	(Thailand) Peemai Erawan	Lumpinee Stadium	Bangkok, Thailand	Decision	5	3:00
2017-11-07	Win	(Thailand) Phettareua Cedakobwatsaduphan	Lumpinee Stadium	Bangkok, Thailand	Decision	5	3:00
Wins Lumpinee Stadium 108 lbs title
2017-09-05	Win	(Thailand) Saknarin Pangkongprab	Lumpinee Stadium	Bangkok, Thailand	Decision	5	3:00
2017-08-04	Win	(Thailand) Branthai Kelasport	Lumpinee Stadium	Bangkok, Thailand	Decision	5	3:00
2017-07-04	Win	(Thailand) Thai Parunchai	Lumpinee Stadium	Bangkok, Thailand	Decision	5	3:00
2017-03-28	Win	(Thailand) Saenchainoi Thanaimichel	Lumpinee Stadium	Bangkok, Thailand	Decision	5	3:00
2017-01-21	Win	(Thailand) Pataktong Sinbeemuaythai	Lumpinee Stadium	Bangkok, Thailand	Decision	5	3:00
2016-10-01	Win	(Thailand) Yodchai YOKKAOSaenchaigym	Lumpinee Stadium	Bangkok, Thailand	Decision	5	3:00
2016-08-20	Win	(Thailand) Somjitlek Sor.Charoenpaet	Lumpinee Stadium	Bangkok, Thailand	Decision	5	3:00
2016-07-06	Win	(Thailand) Phadetsuk Sor.Sakcharoen	Lumpinee Stadium	Bangkok, Thailand	Decision	5	3:00
2015-12-28	Win	(Thailand) Chalongchai Sitnayoksamran	Rajadamnern Stadium	Bangkok, Thailand	Decision	5	3:00
Legend: Win Loss Draw/No contest Notes
