= Chalam Parunchai =

Thai professional Muay Thai fighter

- Born: Jakkrit Kongtook; July 10, 1995 (age 31); Nakhon Si Thammarat, Thailand
- Native name: จักรกฤษณ์ คงสุข
- Other names: Chalarm Paranchai
- Nickname: Shark Bite (ฉลามงาบ)
- Height: 174 cm (5 ft 9 in)
- Division: Super Bantamweight; Featherweight; Super Featherweight
- Style: Muay Thai (Muay Femur)
- Stance: Orthodox
- Fighting out of: Thung Song, Thailand

Kickboxing record
- Total: 84
- Wins: 65
- Losses: 17
- Draws: 2

Jakkrit Kongtook (Thai: จักรกฤษณ์ คงสุข; born July 10, 1995), known professionally as Chalam Parunchai (Thai: ฉลาม พรัญชัย) is a Thai professional Muay Thai fighter. He is the current Rajadamnern Super Featherweight Champion, former two-time Lumpinee Stadium Featherweight Champion, former Channel 7 Stadium Bantamweight Champion, and former Channel 7 Stadium Super Featherweight Champion

As of October 2024, he is currently ranked as the #1 Super Featherweight by the WMO and Combat Press.

== Titles and accomplishments ==
=== Muay Thai ===
- Channel 7 Stadium
  - 2015 Channel 7 Stadium Super Bantamweight (122 lbs) Champion
  - 2021 Channel 7 Stadium Super Featherweight (130 lbs) Champion
- Lumpinee Stadium
  - 2017 Lumpinee Stadium Featherweight (126 lbs) Champion
    - One successful title defense
  - 2020 Lumpinee Stadium Featherweight (126 lbs) Champion
- Rajadamnern Stadium
  - 2024 Rajadamnern Stadium Super Featherweight (130 lbs) Champion
    - Three successful title defenses

=== Kickboxing ===
- World Association of Kickboxing Organizations
  - 2024 WAKO Asian Kickboxing Championship K-1 -63.5 kg (silver)
- SEA Games
  - 2025 SEA Games Kickboxing K-1 -60 kg (silver)

== Fight record ==
Muay Thai Record
65 Wins, 17 Losses, 2 Draws
Date	Result	Opponent	Event	Location	Method	Round	Time
2026-07-25	Loss	(Thailand) Yodkatanyu Jitmuangnon	Rajadamnern World Series	Bangkok, Thailand	Decision (Unanimous)	5	3:00
Loses the Rajadamnern Stadium Super Featherweight (130 lbs) title.
2026-04-04	Win	(Thailand) Kiwthong TKD MuaythaiGym	Rajadamnern World Series, Rajadamnern Stadium	Bangkok, Thailand	Decision (Unanimous)	5	3:00
Defends the Rajadamnern Stadium Super Featherweight (130 lbs) title.
2026-01-31	Win	(Thailand) Kaipa Por.WisetGym	Rajadamnern World Series	Bangkok, Thailand	Decision (Unanimous)	5	3:00
Defends the Rajadamnern Stadium Super Featherweight (130 lbs) title.
2025-05-17	Loss	(Thailand) Sangmanee Sor Tienpo	Rajadamnern World Series	Bangkok, Thailand	Decision (Split)	5	3:00
For the Rajadamnern Stadium Lightweight (135 lbs) title.
2025-01-11	Win	(Thailand) Thongnoi Wor.Sangprapai	Rajadamnern World Series	Bangkok, Thailand	Decision (Unanimous)	5	3:00
Defends the Rajadamnern Stadium Super Featherweight (130 lbs) title.
2024-06-08	Win	(Thailand) Kompatak SinbiMuayThai	Rajadamnern World Series	Bangkok, Thailand	Decision (Unanimous)	5	3:00
Wins the Rajadamnern Stadium Super Featherweight (130 lbs) title.
2024-04-20	Win	(Iran) Amirhossein Esmaeili	Rajadamnern World Series	Bangkok, Thailand	KO (Right cross)	3	0:25
2023-12-27	Draw	(Thailand) Samingdet Nor.Anuwatgym	Rajadamnern Stadium 78th Birthday Show	Bangkok, Thailand	Decision	5	3:00
2023-05-28	Win	(Iran) Mohammad Sadeghi	ONE Friday Fights 14, Lumpinee Stadium	Bangkok, Thailand	Decision (Majority)	3	3:00
2023-01-28	Win	(Thailand) Petchdam Petchyindee Academy	Suek Muay Mahakuson Samakom Chao Paktai	Bangkok, Thailand	Decision	5	3:00
2022-11-18	Win	(Thailand) Flukenoi Kiatfahlikit	Ruamponkon + Prachin	Prachinburi province, Thailand	Decision	5	3:00
2022-08-13	Win	(Thailand) Phetsukumvit Boybangna	Ruamponkon Samui, Petchbuncha Stadium	Ko Samui, Thailand	Decision	5	3:00
2021-12-13	Win	(Thailand) Phetwason Boybangna	Kanla Krang Neung, Rajadamnern Stadium	Bangkok, Thailand	Decision	5	3:00
2021-04-11	Win	(Thailand) ET Tded99	Channel 7 Stadium	Bangkok, Thailand	Decision	5	3:00
Wins the Channel 7 Stadium Super Featherweight (130 lbs) title.
2020-09-13	Win	(Thailand) View Petchkoson	Channel 7 Stadium	Bangkok, Thailand	Decision	5	3:00
2020-03-06	Win	(Thailand) View Petchkoson	Lumpinee Stadium	Bangkok, Thailand	Decision	5	3:00
Wins the vacant Lumpinee Stadium Featherweight (126 lbs) title.
2020-01-31	Win	(Thailand) Chorfah Tor.Sangtiennoi	Phuket Super Fight Real MuayThai	Phuket Province, Thailand	Decision	5	3:00
2019-11-14	Win	(Thailand) Mongkolchai Kwaitonggym	Rajadamnern Stadium	Bangkok, Thailand	Decision	5	3:00
2019-10-05	Loss	(Thailand) Kiewpayak Jitmuangnon	Suek Muay Thai Vithee Isaan Tai	Buriram, Thailand	Decision	5	3:00
2019-08-18	Draw	(Thailand) Messi Pangkongprab	Rajadamnern Stadium	Bangkok, Thailand	Decision	5	3:00
2019-06-26	Loss	(Thailand) Kiewpayak Jitmuangnon	RuamponkonSamui + Kiatpetch Super Fight	Surat Thani Province, Thailand	KO (Left elbow)	3	
2019-05-29	Win	(Thailand) Detsakda PhuKongYatSuepUdomSuk	Rajadamnern Stadium	Bangkok, Thailand	KO (Left elbow)	3	
2019-02-12	Win	(Thailand) Messi Pangkongprab	Lumpinee Stadium	Bangkok, Thailand	Decision	5	3:00
2018-12-11	Win	(Thailand) Siwakon Kiatjaroenchai	Lumpinee Stadium	Bangkok, Thailand	Decision	5	3:00
Defends the Lumpinee Stadium Featherweight (126 lbs) title.
2018-09-12	Loss	(Thailand) Chanasuk Kor.Kampanath	Rajadamnern Stadium	Bangkok, Thailand	Decision	5	3:00
2018-08-02	Win	(Thailand) Chanasuk Kor.Kampanath	Rajadamnern Stadium	Bangkok, Thailand	Decision	5	3:00
2018-06-25	Loss	(Thailand) Mongkolchai Kwaitonggym	Birthday Nayok-A-Thasala + Kiatpetch	Nakhon Si Thammarat, Thailand	Decision	5	3:00
2018-03-28	Win	(Thailand) Prajanchai P.K.Saenchaimuaythaigym	WanParunchai + Poonseua Sanjorn	Nakhon Si Thammarat, Thailand	Decision	5	3:00
2017-12-08	Loss	(Thailand) Ronachai Tor.Ramintra	Lumpinee Stadium	Bangkok, Thailand	Decision	5	3:00
2017-11-07	Win	(Thailand) Messi Pangkongprab	Lumpinee Stadium	Bangkok, Thailand	Decision	5	3:00
Wins the Lumpinee Stadium Featherweight (126 lbs) title.
2017-07-14	Win	(Thailand) Sprinter Pangkongprab		Ko Samui, Thailand	Decision	5	3:00
2017-06-09	Loss	(Thailand) Tawanchai PK Saenchaimuaythaigym	Lumpinee Stadium	Bangkok, Thailand	Decision	5	3:00
2016-09-30	Loss	(Thailand) Suakim PK Saenchaimuaythaigym	Lumpinee Stadium	Bangkok, Thailand	Decision	5	3:00
For Thailand Super Bantamweight (122 lbs) title.
2016-08-24	Win	(Thailand) Phet Sawansangmanja	Rajadamnern Stadium	Bangkok, Thailand	Decision	5	3:00
2016-07-08	Loss	(Thailand) Panpayak Jitmuangnon	Lumpinee Stadium	Bangkok, Thailand	TKO (High kick)	2	
2016-06-09	Win	(Thailand) Yodmungkol Muangsima	Rajadamnern Stadium	Bangkok, Thailand	Decision	5	3:00
2016-04-29	Win	(Thailand) Prajanchai P.K.Saenchaimuaythaigym	Lumpinee Stadium	Bangkok, Thailand	Decision	5	3:00
2016-04-05	Win	(Thailand) Yardfa R-Airlines	Lumpinee Stadium	Bangkok, Thailand	Decision	5	3:00
2016-03-04	Win	(Thailand) Prajanchai P.K.Saenchaimuaythaigym	Lumpinee Stadium	Bangkok, Thailand	Decision	5	3:00
2015-12-13	Win	(Thailand) Phet or.Pimonsri	Channel 7 Stadium	Bangkok, Thailand	KO (Knees)	3	
Wins the Channel 7 Stadium Super Bantamweight (122 lbs) title.
2015-11-10	Win	(Thailand) Sprinter Pangkongprab	Lumpinee Stadium	Bangkok, Thailand	Decision	5	3:00
2015-10-11	Win	(Thailand) Satanfah Eminentair	Channel 7 Stadium	Bangkok, Thailand	Decision	5	3:00
2015-08-29	Win	(Thailand) Chalongchai Kaitcharoenchai	Phunpanmuang	Bangkok, Thailand	Decision	5	3:00
2015-07-29	Loss	(Thailand) Jakdao Witsanukonkan		Songkhla, Thailand	Decision	5	3:00
2015-07-13	Win	(Thailand) Phetlukyod Sor WichitPadRiew	Channel 7 Satdium	Bangkok, Thailand	Decision	5	3:00
Legend: Win Loss Draw/No contest Notes

Amateur Kickboxing record
Date	Result	Opponent	Event	Location	Method	Round	Time
2025-12-16	Loss	(Indonesia) Riyan Jefri Hamonongan	2025 SEA Games, Final	Samut Prakan, Thailand	Decision	3	2:00
Wins 2025 SEA Games K-1 -60 kg Silver medal.
2025-12-15	Loss	(Vietnam) Hong Gia Dai	2025 SEA Games, Semifinals	Samut Prakan, Thailand	Decision (3:0)	3	2:00
2025-12-14	Loss	(Myanmar) Tun Min Naing	2025 SEA Games, Quarterfinals	Samut Prakan, Thailand	Decision (3:0)	3	2:00
2025-08-13	Loss	(Ukraine) Hlib Mazur	2025 World Games - K-1 Tournament, Semifinals	Chengdu, China	Decision (2:1)	3	2:00
2025-08-12	Win	(Moldova) Stanislav Renita	2025 World Games - K-1 Tournament, Quarterfinals	Chengdu, China	KO	1	
2024-10-	Loss	(Uzbekistan) Asilbek Sodikov	2024 WAKO Asian Kickboxing Championship, Final	Phnom Penh, Cambodia	Decision (3:0)	3	2:00
Wins 2024 WAKO Asian Championship K-1 -63.5 kg Silver medal.
2024-10-	Win	(China) Fu Yunjie	2024 WAKO Asian Kickboxing Championship, Semifinals	Phnom Penh, Cambodia	Decision (3:0)	3	2:00
2024-10-	Win	(Saudi Arabia) Nadheer Mujtab	2024 WAKO Asian Kickboxing Championship, Quarterfinals	Phnom Penh, Cambodia	Decision (3:0)	3	2:00
2024-09-	Loss	(Algeria) Dhia Eddine Nekaa	2024 WAKO Uzbekistan Kickboxing World Cup, Semifinals	Tashkent, Uzbekistan	Decision (2:1)	3	2:00
2024-09-	Win	(Kyrgyzstan) Adilet Ulan Uulu	2024 WAKO Uzbekistan Kickboxing World Cup, Quarterfinals	Tashkent, Uzbekistan	Decision (2:1)	3	2:00
Legend: Win Loss Draw/No contest Notes
