= Chorfah Tor.Sangtiennoi =

Thai professional Muay Thai fighter

- Born: Suwat Tingnangrong; October 26, 1993 (age 32); Lahan Sai, Buriram, Thailand
- Other names: Tiankhao Tor.Sagntiennoi (เทียนขาว ท.แสงเทียนน้อย)
- Height: 170 cm (5 ft 7 in)
- Division: Mini Flyweight; Bantamweight; Super Featherweight; Lightweight
- Style: Muay Thai (Muay Khao)
- Stance: Orthodox
- Fighting out of: Pathum Thani, Thailand
- Team: Tor.Sangtiennoi
- Trainer: Sangtiennoi Sor.Rungroj

Suwat Tingnangrong (Thai: ???; born October 26, 1993), known professionally as Chorfah Tor.Sangtiennoi (Thai: ช่อฟ้า ท.แสงเทียนน้อย) is a Thai professional Muay Thai fighter.

== Titles and accomplishments ==
- Rajadamnern Stadium
  - 2018 Rajadamnern Stadium Fight of the Year (vs Rodtang Jitmuangnon)
  - 2022 Rajadamnern Stadium Fight of the Year (vs Petchdam Petchyindee Academy)
- Muay Thai Nai Khanomtom Association
  - 2021 Muay Thai Nai Khanomtom Lightweight (135 lbs) Champion

== Fight record ==
Muay Thai Record
Date	Result	Opponent	Event	Location	Method	Round	Time
2023-12-22	Win	(Japan) Eisaku Ogasawara	ONE Friday Fights 46, Lumpinee Stadium	Bangkok, Thailand	KO (Right cross)	2	0:57
2023-10-27	Win	(Thailand) Pompet PK Saenchai	ONE Friday Fights 38, Lumpinee Stadium	Bangkok, Thailand	Decision (Unanimous)	3	3:00
2023-09-09	Win	(Thailand) Mongkolkaew Sor.Sommai	ONE Friday Fights 31, Lumpinee Stadium	Bangkok, Thailand	KO (Left hook)	2	0:31
2023-05-28	Loss	(Thailand) Gingsanglek Tor.Laksong	ONE Friday Fights 14, Lumpinee Stadium	Bangkok, Thailand	KO (High kick)	2	
2023-03-24	Win	(Kyrgyzstan) Sherzod Kabutov	ONE Friday Fights 10, Lumpinee Stadium	Bangkok, Thailand	Decision (Split)	3	3:00
2023-02-03	Loss	(Thailand) Phetsukumvit Boybangna	ONE Friday Fights 3, Lumpinee Stadium	Bangkok, Thailand	Decision (Unanimous)	3	3:00
2022-12-03	Loss	(Russia) Tagir Khalilov	ONE 164: Pacio vs. Brooks	Manila, Philippines	TKO (Uppercut)	1	2:30
2022-09-18	Win	(Thailand) Kompatak Or.Atchariya	Suek Muay Thai Witee Tin Thai Muang Nam Dam	Kalasin province, Thailand	Decision (Split)	5	3:00
2022-08-25	Draw	(Thailand) Petchdam Petchyindee Academy	Petchyindee, Rajadamnern Stadium	Bangkok, Thailand	Decision	5	3:00
2022-06-12	Loss	(Thailand) Nabil VenumMuayThai	Muaydee VitheeThai + Jitmuangnon, Or.Tor.Gor3 Stadium	Nonthaburi province, Thailand	Decision	5	3:00
2022-05-12	Win	(Thailand) Samingdet Nor.Anuwatgym	Petchyindee, Rajadamnern Stadium	Bangkok, Thailand	Decision	5	3:00
2022-03-25	Loss	(Thailand) Kompatak Or.Atchariya	Muaymanwansuk, Rangsit Stadium	Bangkok, Thailand	Decision	5	3:00
2022-02-17	Win	(Thailand) Nabil VenumMuayThai	Petchyindee, Rajadamnern Stadium	Bangkok, Thailand	Decision	5	3:00
2021-12-23	Win	(Thailand) Fonpanlan SorJor.OleyYasothon	Petchyindee + Nai Khanomtom International Championship	Ayutthaya Province, Thailand	Decision	5	3:00
Wins the Muay Thai Nai Khanomtom Association Lightweight (135 lbs) title.
2021-11-26	Loss	(Thailand) Kompatak SinbiMuayThai	Muay Thai Moradok Kon Thai + Rajadamnern Super Fight	Buriram, Thailand	Decision	5	3:00
2021-10-16	Loss	(Thailand) Duangsompong Jitmuangnon	Muaydee VitheeThai, OrTorGor.3 Stadium	Nonthaburi Province, Thailand	Decision	5	3:00
2021-04-09	Win	(Thailand) Mongkolpetch Petchyindee Academy	Petchyindee Road Show	Songkhla, Thailand	Decision	5	3:00
2021-02-28	Win	(Thailand) Prajanban SorJor.Vichitmuangpadriew	Muaydee VitheeThai, Blue Arena	Samut Prakan, Thailand	KO (Knees)	4	
2020-11-07	Win	(Thailand) Luknimit Singklongsi	SAT Heroes Series, World Siam Stadium	Bangkok, Thailand	KO (Elbow)	3	
2020-09-26	Loss	(Thailand) Yodkhuntap SorGor.SuNgaigym	Onesongchai, Thanakorn Stadium	Nakhon Pathom, Thailand	Decision	5	3:00
For the S-1 Lightweight (135 lbs) title.
2020-09-03	Win	(Thailand) Kiewpayak Jitmuangnon	Rajadamnern Stadium	Bangkok, Thailand	KO (Right cross)	3	
2020-08-12	Win	(Thailand) Duangsompong Jitmuangnon	Rajadamnern Stadium	Bangkok, Thailand	TKO (Referee Stoppage)	4	
2020-02-27	Win	(Thailand) Prajanban SorJor.Vichitmuangpadriew	Rajadamnern Stadium	Bangkok, Thailand	KO (Right elbow)	4	
2020-01-31	Loss	(Thailand) Chalam Parunchai	Phuket Super Fight Real MuayThai	Phuket Province, Thailand	Decision	5	3:00
2020-01-08	Loss	(Thailand) Ployvitaya Moosaphanmai	Rajadamnern Stadium	Bangkok, Thailand	Decision	5	3:00
2019-09-28	Loss	(Thailand) Lamnamoonlek Tded99	Yodmuay Onesongchai, Royal Thai Air Force Sports Stadium	Pathum Thani, Thailand	Decision	5	3:00
For the S-1 Super Featherweight (130 lbs) title.
2019-08-29	Win	(Thailand) Yodkhuntap SorGor.SuNgaigym	Rajadamnern Stadium	Bangkok, Thailand	TKO (Low kick)	4	
2019-07-01	Win	(Thailand) Apiwat Sor.Somnuek	Rajadamnern Stadium	Bangkok, Thailand	Decision	5	3:00
2019-05-11	Loss	(Thailand) Yodkhuntap SorGor.SuNgaigym	Rajadamnern Stadium	Bangkok, Thailand	Decision	5	3:00
2019-03-28	Win	(Thailand) Yodkhuntap SorGor.SuNgaigym	Rajadamnern Stadium	Bangkok, Thailand	Decision	5	3:00
2019-03-07	Loss	(Thailand) Rodtang Jitmuangnon	Rajadamnern Stadium	Bangkok, Thailand	Decision	5	3:00
2019-01-24	Win	(Thailand) Dechsakda Phukongyadsuebudomsuk	Rajadamnern Stadium	Bangkok, Thailand	Decision	5	3:00
2018-12-06	Win	(Thailand) Kiewpayak Jitmuangnon	Rajadamnern Stadium	Bangkok, Thailand	KO (Right cross)	3	
2018-10-12	Win	(France) Arthur Meyer	All Star Muay Thai	Aubervilliers, France	Decision	5	3:00
2018-08-30	Loss	(Thailand) Rodtang Jitmuangnon	Rajadamnern Stadium	Bangkok, Thailand	Decision	5	3:00
2018-08-06	Win	(Thailand) Luknimit Singklongsi	Rajadamnern Stadium	Bangkok, Thailand	Decision	5	3:00
2018-05-03	Win	(France) Yassine Hamlaoui	MFC 7	France	KO	2	
2018-04-02	Win	(Thailand) Luknimit Singklongsi	Rajadamnern Stadium	Bangkok, Thailand	Decision	5	3:00
2018-03-08	Win	(Thailand) Morakot Konsaimai	Rajadamnern Stadium	Bangkok, Thailand	KO	3	
2018-02-14	Draw	(Thailand) Luknimit Singklongsi	Rajadamnern Stadium	Bangkok, Thailand	Decision	5	3:00
2018-01-12	Loss	(Thailand) Lamnamoonlek Tded99	Lumpinee Stadium	Bangkok, Thailand	Decision	5	3:00
2017-11-02	Win	(Thailand) Ployvitaya Moosaphanmai	Rajadamnern Stadium	Bangkok, Thailand	Decision	5	3:00
2017-09-09	Loss	(Thailand) Ployvitaya Moosaphanmai	Samui Fight	Ko Samui, Thailand	Decision	5	3:00
2017-08-11	Loss	(Thailand) Yamin PK.Saenchaimuaythaigym	Lumpinee Stadium	Bangkok, Thailand	Decision	5	3:00
2017-06-26	Draw	(Thailand) Kongdanai Sor.Sommai	Rajadamnern Stadium	Bangkok, Thailand	Decision	5	3:00
2017-06-01	Loss	(Thailand) Chai Sor.Jor.Toypedriew	Rajadamnern Stadium	Bangkok, Thailand	Decision	5	3:00
2017-05-03	Loss	(Thailand) Khanongsuk Kor.Kampanat	Rajadamnern Stadium	Bangkok, Thailand	Decision	5	3:00
2017-03-30	Win	(Thailand) Luknimit Singklongsi	Rajadamnern Stadium	Bangkok, Thailand	Decision	5	3:00
2017-01-12	Win	(Thailand) Luknimit Singklongsi	Rajadamnern Stadium	Bangkok, Thailand	Decision	5	3:00
2016-06-11	Win	(Thailand) Chalamsuk Nitisamui	Montri Studio	Bangkok, Thailand	Decision	5	3:00
2016-01-30	Loss	(Thailand) Pakkalek Tor.Laksong	Montri Studio	Bangkok, Thailand	Decision	5	3:00
2015-12-23	Loss	(Thailand) Phetlamsin Chor.Hapayak	Rajadamnern Stadium	Bangkok, Thailand	Decision	5	3:00
2015-11-19	Win	(Thailand) Pakkalek Tor.Laksong	Rajadamnern Stadium	Bangkok, Thailand	Decision	5	3:00
2015-11-07	Loss	(Thailand) Senwongchai JSP	OneSongchai, Rajadamnern Stadium	Bangkok, Thailand	Decision	5	3:00
2015-10-14	Win	(Thailand) Luknimit Singklongsi	OneSongchai, Rajadamnern Stadium	Bangkok, Thailand	Decision	5	3:00
2015-09-12	Loss	(Thailand) Phetlamsin Chor.Hapayak	Montri Studio	Bangkok, Thailand	Decision	5	3:00
2015-08-10	Win	(Thailand) Khunsuek Aikbangsai	Rajadamnern Stadium	Bangkok, Thailand	KO	3	
2015-07-09	Win	(Thailand) Khanongsuk Kor.Kampanat	Rajadamnern Stadium	Bangkok, Thailand	Decision	5	3:00
2015-05-28	Loss	(Thailand) Prajanchai P.K.Saenchaimuaythaigym	Rajadamnern Stadium	Bangkok, Thailand	Decision	5	3:00
2015-05-07	Loss	(Thailand) Senwongchai JSP	Rajadamnern Stadium	Bangkok, Thailand	Decision	5	3:00
2015-03-30	Draw	(Thailand) Prajanchai P.K.Saenchaimuaythaigym	Rajadamnern Stadium	Bangkok, Thailand	Decision	5	3:00
2015-02-02	Win	(Thailand) Fonpad Chuwattana	Rajadamnern Stadium	Bangkok, Thailand	KO	3	
2015-01-08	Win	(Thailand) Chatchainoi Sitbenjama	Onesongchai, Rajadamnern Stadium	Bangkok, Thailand	Decision	5	3:00
2014-09-24	Loss	(Thailand) Phetlamsin Chor.Hapayak	Rajadamnern Stadium	Bangkok, Thailand	Decision	5	3:00
2014-08-14	Loss	(Thailand) Prajanchai P.K.Saenchaimuaythaigym	Rajadamnern Stadium	Bangkok, Thailand	Decision	5	3:00
2014-07-16	Loss	(Thailand) Luknimit Singklongsi	Rajadamnern Stadium	Bangkok, Thailand	Decision	5	3:00
2014-06-25	Draw	(Thailand) Luknimit Singklongsi	Rajadamnern Stadium	Bangkok, Thailand	Decision	5	3:00
2014-03-05	Win	(Thailand) Naka Kaewsamrit	OneSongChai	Nakhon Ratchasima, Thailand	TKO (Doctor Stop)	2	
2014-01-24	Win	(Thailand) Wanchana Or Boonchuay	Lumpinee Stadium	Bangkok, Thailand	Decision	5	3:00
2014-01-03	Draw	(Thailand) Wanchana Or Boonchuay	Lumpinee Stadium	Bangkok, Thailand	Decision	5	3:00
2013-11-18	Draw	(Thailand) Wanchana Or Boonchuay	Lumpinee Stadium	Bangkok, Thailand	Decision	5	3:00
2013-10-24	Win	(Thailand) Chatchainoi Sitbenjama	Onesongchai, Rajadamnern Stadium	Bangkok, Thailand	Decision	5	3:00
2013-08-05	Loss	(Thailand) Suakim Sit Sor.Tor.Taew	Lumpinee Stadium	Bangkok, Thailand	KO (Right Elbow)	4	
2013-06-03	Win	(Thailand) Lamnampong Noomjeantawana	Rajadamnern Stadium	Bangkok, Thailand	Decision	5	3:00
2013-04-25	Loss	(Thailand) Chankrit Ekbangsai	Rajadamnern Stadium	Bangkok, Thailand	Decision	5	3:00
2013-02-21	Win	(Thailand) Kaewkla Kaewsamrit	Rajadamnern Stadium	Bangkok, Thailand	Decision	5	3:00
2013-01-04	Win	(Thailand) Petlukyod Sor Sitichai	Rajadamnern Stadium	Bangkok, Thailand	KO (Knees)	3	
2010-07-15	Loss	(Thailand) Prajanchai Por.Phetnamtong	Rajadamnern Stadium	Bangkok, Thailand	Decision	5	3:00
2010-06-10	Loss	(Thailand) Prajanchai Por.Phetnamtong	Rajadamnern Stadium	Bangkok, Thailand	Decision	5	3:00
For the vacant Rajadamnern Stadium Mini Flyweight (105 lbs) title.
Legend: Win Loss Draw/No contest Notes
