= Petchyindee Academy =

Muay Thai gym in Bangkok

Petchyindee Academy is a Muay Thai gym located in Bangkok. It is owned by Nuttadaj Vachirarattanawong. It is the only Muay Thai gym in Thailand to apply Sport Science to improve their fighters' potential.

== Notable fighters ==
- Ruengsak Porntawee
- Petchdam Petchyindee Academy
- Phetmorakot Petchyindee Academy
- Praewprao PetchyindeeAcademy
- Capitan Petchyindee Academy
- Sorgraw Petchyindee Academy
- Mongkolpetch Petchyindee Academy
- Rittewada Petchyindee Academy
- Savvas Michael
