= Yothin FA Group =

Thai Muay Thai fighter

Yothin F.A.Group
- Born: Yothin Hamuthai; February 22, 1992 (age 34); Udon Thani, Thailand
- Native name: โยธิน เหมุทัย
- Other names: Yothin Sakaethongresort
- Height: 168 cm (5 ft 6 in)
- Division: Bantamweight; Featherweight
- Style: Muay Thai (Muay Khao)
- Stance: Orthodox
- Fighting out of: Bangkok, Thailand
- Team: F.A.Group Gym
- Trainer: Kru Diesel
- Years active: c. 1997-present

Kickboxing record
- Total: 364
- Wins: 335
- Losses: 27
- Draws: 2

Other information
- Occupation: Muay Thai fighter

Yothin Hamuthai (Thai: โยธิน เหมุทัย; born February 22, 1992), known professionally as Yothin F.A.Group (Thai: โยธิน เอฟ.เอ.กรุ๊ป), the “King of Muay Khao”, is a Thai Muay Thai fighter. He is the current Rajadamnern Stadium Featherweight Champion.

== Biography and career ==
Yothin started fighting at 5 years old and was training in his hometown before joining the Sakaethongresort gym in the Isan region until he was scouted by FA Group gym.

Yothin has modeled his career on that of a knee fighter from the same gym Petchboonchu FA Group under the same teacher Kru Diesel.

From March 2016 to March 2017 Yothin had 8 victories and only 1 defeat which led him to be on the shortlist for the Thailand Sports Writers Fighter of the Year Award. This extended winning streak in the Rajadamnern Stadium got Yothin to be ranked #1 in the stadium rankings in his division.

After becoming the 2024 WBC Muay Thai International Featherweight (126 lbs) Champion, Yothin became the 2024 Rajadamnern Stadium Featherweight (126 lbs) Champion. He successfully defended his Rajadamnern title in May 2025.

== Titles and accomplishments ==
- World Muay Thai Council
  - 2016 WMC World Bantamweight (118 lbs) Champion
- True4U Muaymanwansuk
  - 2016 True4U Bantamweight (118 lbs) Champion
- Professional Boxing Association of Thailand (PAT)
  - 2021 Thailand Featherweight (126 lbs) Champion
  - 2023 Thailand Featherweight (126 lbs) Champion
- International Federation of Muaythai Associations
  - 2022 IFMA World Championships -57 kg (bronze)
- Rajadamnern Stadium
  - 2022 Rajadamnern World Series Featherweight (126 lbs) Winner
  - 2024 Rajadamnern Stadium Featherweight (126 lbs) Champion
    - One successful title defense
- World Boxing Council Muay Thai
  - 2024 WBC Muay Thai International Featherweight (126 lbs) Champion

== Fight record ==
Muay Thai Record
106 Wins, 28 Losses, 2 Draws
Date	Result	Opponent	Event	Location	Method	Round	Time
2026-08-22	Win	(Thailand) Fairang Chor.Hapayak	Rajadamnern World Series	Bangkok, Thailand	Decision (Split)	3	3:00
2026-03-28	Loss	(Thailand) Chiebkhad Por.Pongsawang	Rajadamnern World Series	Bangkok, Thailand	Decision (Unanimous)	5	3:00
Loses the Rajadamnern Stadium Featherweight (126 lbs) title.
2025-05-10	Win	(Thailand) Chaila Por.Lakboon	Rajadamnern World Series	Bangkok, Thailand	Decision (Unanimous)	5	3:00
Defends the Rajadamnern Stadium Featherweight (126 lbs) title.
2025-02-15	Win	(Russia) Aslanbek Zikreev	Rajadamnern World Series	Bangkok, Thailand	Decision (Unanimous)	3	3:00
2024-07-13	Win	(Spain) Andres Unzue	Rajadamnern World Series	Bangkok, Thailand	KO (Elbow)	1	
2024-04-27	Win	(Thailand) Chaila Por.Lakboon	Rajadamnern World Series	Bangkok, Thailand	Decision (Split)	5	3:00
Wins the Rajadamnern Stadium Featherweight (126 lbs) title.
2024-02-17	Win	(Cambodia) Bird Songkherm	1774 Muaythai Series	Yagoona, Australia	TKO (Doctor stoppage)	1	3:00
Wins the WBC Muay Thai International Featherweight (126 lbs) title.
2023-12-27	Loss	(Thailand) View Petchkoson	Rajadamnern Stadium 78th Birthday Show	Bangkok, Thailand	Decision (Unanimous)	5	3:00
2023-11-04	Win	(Thailand) Surasak KruDamGym	Rajadamnern World Series	Bangkok, Thailand	Decision (Unanimous)	3	3:00
2023-09-11	Win	(Thailand) Ronachai Tor.Ramintra	Sor.Sommai Birthday, Thupatemi Stadium	Pathum Thani province, Thailand	Decision (Unanimous)	5	3:00
Wins the vacant Thailand Featherweight (126 lbs) title.
2023-05-25	Loss	(Thailand) Chaila Por.Lakboon	Petchyindee, Rajadamnern Stadium	Bangkok, Thailand	Decision	5	3:00
2023-04-29	Win	(Thailand) Petchchatchai ChaoraiOai	Rajadamnern World Series	Bangkok, Thailand	TKO (Elbow)	2	2:06
2022-12-16	Win	(Thailand) Petchrungruang Sor.Jor.Tongprajin	Rajadamnern World Series - Final	Bangkok, Thailand	Decision (Unanimous)	5	3:00
Wins the 2022 Rajadamnern World Series Featherweight (126 lbs) title.
2022-11-11	Win	(Iraq) Ayad Albadr	Rajadamnern World Series - Semi Final	Bangkok, Thailand	Decision (Unanimous)	3	3:00
2022-10-07	Win	(Thailand) Petchrungruang Sor.Jor.Tongprajin	Rajadamnern World Series - Group Stage	Bangkok, Thailand	Decision (Unanimous)	3	3:00
2022-09-02	Win	(England) John Shink	Rajadamnern World Series - Group Stage	Bangkok, Thailand	Decision (Unanimous)	3	3:00
2022-07-29	Win	(Egypt) Ayad Albadr	Rajadamnern World Series - Group Stage	Bangkok, Thailand	Decision (Unanimous)	3	3:00
2022-06-20	Loss	(Thailand) Ronachai Tor.Ramintra	U-Muay RuamJaiKonRakMuayThai + Palangmai, Rajadamnern Stadium	Bangkok, Thailand	Decision	5	3:00
2022-05-04	Win	(Thailand) Samingdam Chor.Ajalaboon	Muay Thai Palangmai, Rajadamnern Stadium	Bangkok, Thailand	Decision	5	3:00
2022-02-26	Loss	(Kyrgyzstan) Sherzod Kabutov	Muay Thai Fighter X	Hua Hin, Thailand	Decision	5	3:00
2022-01-08	Loss	(Thailand) Samingdam Chor.Ajalaboon	Suk Jao Muay Thai, Siam Omnoi Stadium	Samut Sakhon, Thailand	Decision (Unanimous)	5	3:00
For the vacant IMC Featherweight (126 lbs) title.
2021-11-20	Win	(Thailand) Chaila Por.Lakboon	Suk Jao Muay Thai, Siam Omnoi Stadium	Samut Sakhon, Thailand	Decision	5	3:00
Wins the vacant Thailand Featherweight (126 lbs) title.
2021-10-10	Win	(Thailand) Nawaek Sitchefboontham	Suk Jao Muay Thai, Siam Omnoi Stadium	Samut Sakhon, Thailand	Decision	5	3:00
2020-11-14	Draw	(Brazil) Felype Morais	Muay Hardcore	Bangkok, Thailand	Decision	3	3:00
2020-09-04	Win	(Thailand) Pompetch SorSor.Toipadriew	True4U Muaymanwansuk, Rangsit Stadium	Rangsit, Thailand	Decision	5	3:00
2020-07-24	Loss	(Thailand) Tongnoi Lukbanyai	True4U Muaymanwansuk, Rangsit Stadium	Rangsit, Thailand	Decision	5	3:00
2020-02-09	Win	(Thailand) Petchsuntri Jitmuangnon	Rajadamnern Stadium	Bangkok, Thailand	Decision	5	3:00
2019-11-21	Loss	(Thailand) Samingdet Nor.Anuwatgym	Rajadamnern Stadium	Bangkok, Thailand	Decision	5	3:00
2019-10-03	Win	(Thailand) Samingdet Nor.Anuwatgym	Rajadamnern Stadium	Bangkok, Thailand	Decision	5	3:00
2019-08-09	Draw	(Thailand) Samingdet Nor.Anuwatgym	Petchyindee True4U Lumpinee Stadium	Bangkok, Thailand	Decision	5	3:00
For The 118lbs True4U Muaymumwansuek title.
2019-07-05	Win	(Thailand) Rungnarai Kiatmuu9	Muaymanwansuk + Petchpiya Lumpinee Stadium	Bangkok, Thailand	KO (Right elbow)	3	
2019-05-09	Loss	(Thailand) Kompatak SinbiMuayThai	Rajadamnern Stadium	Bangkok, Thailand	Decision	5	3:00
2019-03-21	Win	(Thailand) Detchaiya PetchyindeeAcademy	Rajadamnern Stadium	Bangkok, Thailand	Decision	5	3:00
2019-02-01	Loss	(Thailand) Kompatak SinbiMuayThai	Lumpinee Stadium	Bangkok, Thailand	Decision	5	3:00
2018-11-22	Win	(Thailand) Somraknoi Muayded789	Rajadamnern Stadium	Bangkok, Thailand	Decision	5	3:00
2018-11-01	Loss	(Thailand) Kiewpayak Jitmuangnon	Rajadamnern Stadium	Bangkok, Thailand	Decision	5	3:00
2018-09-10	Win	(Thailand) Saksit Tor.Paopiemsabpedrew	Rajadamnern Stadium	Bangkok, Thailand	Decision	5	3:00
2018-07-26	Win	(Thailand) Puenkon Tor.Surat	Rajadamnern Stadium	Bangkok, Thailand	Decision	5	3:00
2018-05-26	Win	(Myanmar) Petch Cho Hae	Topking World Series	Bangkok, Thailand	KO	2	
2018-04-09	Loss	(Thailand) Kiewpayak Jitmuangnon	Rajadamnern Stadium	Bangkok, Thailand	Decision	5	3:00
2018-03-07	Win	(Thailand) Palangpon PetchyindeeAcademy	Rajadamnern Stadium	Bangkok, Thailand	Decision	5	3:00
2018-02-08	Win	(Thailand) Phetrung Sitnayokkaipadriew	Rajadamnern Stadium	Bangkok, Thailand	Decision	5	3:00
2017-11-09	Win	(Thailand) Saknarinnoi Aor Auansuwan	Rajadamnern Stadium	Bangkok, Thailand	Decision	5	3:00
2017-09-04	Win	(Thailand) Kriangkrai PetchyindeeAcademy	Rajadamnern Stadium	Bangkok, Thailand	Decision	5	3:00
2017-07-06	Win	(Thailand) Somraknoi Muayded789	Rajadamnern Stadium	Bangkok, Thailand	Decision	5	3:00
2017-06-05	Loss	(Thailand) Somraknoi Muayded789	Rajadamnern Stadium	Bangkok, Thailand	Decision	5	3:00
2017-05-04	Loss	(Thailand) Kiewpayak Jitmuangnon	Rajadamnern Stadium	Bangkok, Thailand	Decision	5	3:00
2017-04-06	Win	(Thailand) Kengkaj Por.Pekko	Rajadamnern Stadium	Bangkok, Thailand	Decision	5	3:00
2017-03-15	Win	(Thailand) Kiewpayak Jitmuangnon	Rajadamnern Stadium	Bangkok, Thailand	Decision	5	3:00
2017-02-07	Win	(Thailand) Kiewpayak Jitmuangnon	Lumpinee Stadium	Bangkok, Thailand	Decision	5	3:00
2016-12-23	Win	(Thailand) Kumandoi Petcharoenvit	Rangsit Boxing Stadium	Rangsit, Thailand	Decision	5	3:00
Wins the 118 lbs True4U Muaymumwansuek title.
2016-11-14	Win	(Thailand) Achanai PetchyindeeAcademy	Rajadamnern Stadium	Bangkok, Thailand	Decision	5	3:00
2016-09-30	Win	(Thailand) Wanchalong PK.Saenchai	Lumpinee Stadium	Bangkok, Thailand	Decision	5	3:00
2016-09-05	Win	(Thailand) Kompatak SinbiMuayThai	Rajadamnern Stadium	Bangkok, Thailand	Decision	5	3:00
Wins the WMC World Bantamweight (118 lbs) title.
2016-08-08	Win	(Thailand) Jomhod Eminentair	Rajadamnern Stadium	Bangkok, Thailand	Decision	5	3:00
2016-07-06	Win	(Thailand) Yokmorakot Wor.Sungprapai	Rajadamnern Stadium	Bangkok, Thailand	Decision	5	3:00
2016-05-09	Loss	(Thailand) Achanai PetchyindeeAcademy	Rajadamnern Stadium	Bangkok, Thailand	Decision	5	3:00
2016-04-07	Win	(Thailand) Palangpon PetchyindeeAcademy	Rajadamnern Stadium	Bangkok, Thailand	Decision	5	3:00
2016-03-05	Loss	(Thailand) Kompatak SinbiMuayThai	Rangsit Boxing Stadium	Rangsit, Thailand	KO	4	
2016-01-30	Loss	(Thailand) Kongthoranee Sor.Boongium		Thailand	KO	2	
2015-11-26	Win	(Thailand) Phetprab Mahanakhonortogrup	Rajadamnern Stadium	Bangkok, Thailand	KO	4	
2015-11-02	Win	(Thailand) Achanai PetchyindeeAcademy	Rajadamnern Stadium	Bangkok, Thailand	Decision	5	3:00
2015-10-07	Loss	(Thailand) Achanai PetchyindeeAcademy	Rajadamnern Stadium	Bangkok, Thailand	Decision	5	3:00
2015-09-15	Loss	(Thailand) Morakot Petchsimuen	Lumpinee Stadium	Bangkok, Thailand	Decision	5	3:00
2015-08-11	Win	(Thailand) Palangpon PetchyindeeAcademy	Lumpinee Stadium	Bangkok, Thailand	Decision	5	3:00
2015-07-20	Win	(Thailand) Wanchai Kiatmuu9		Thailand	Decision	5	3:00
2015-06-11	Loss	(Thailand) Morakot Petchsimuen	Rajadamnern Stadium	Bangkok, Thailand	Decision	5	3:00
2015-05-13	Loss	(Thailand) Morakot Petchsimuen	Rajadamnern Stadium	Bangkok, Thailand	Decision	5	3:00
2015-04-08	Win	(Thailand) Fahmai Sor.Sommmai	Rajadamnern Stadium	Bangkok, Thailand	Decision	5	3:00
2015-03-01	Win	(Thailand) Kunhan Chor.Hapayak	Rangsit Boxing Stadium	Rangsit, Thailand	Decision	5	3:00
2015-02-06	Win	(Thailand) Phetwason Or.Daokrajai	Lumpinee Stadium	Bangkok, Thailand	Decision	5	3:00
2014-12-22	Loss	(Thailand) Morakot Petchsimuen	Rajadamnern Stadium	Bangkok, Thailand	Decision	5	3:00
2014-09-10	Loss	(Thailand) Fasitong Sor.Jor.Piek-U-Thai	Rajadamnern Stadium	Bangkok, Thailand	Decision	5	3:00
2014-07-07	Win	(Thailand) Ole Sitniwat	Lumpinee Stadium	Bangkok, Thailand	Decision	5	3:00
2013-04-05	Loss	(Thailand) Panpayak Jitmuangnon	Lumpinee Stadium	Bangkok, Thailand	KO	2	
2013-03-05	Loss	(Thailand) Pragaipet Sagami	Lumpinee Stadium	Bangkok, Thailand	Decision	5	3:00
2013-01-15	Win	(Thailand) Sarawut Pitakparpadaeng	Lumpinee Stadium	Bangkok, Thailand	Decision	5	3:00
2012-12-14	Win	(Thailand) Apisit Fonjangchonburi	Lumpinee Stadium	Bangkok, Thailand	Decision	5	3:00
Legend: Win Loss Draw/No contest Notes

Amateur Muay Thai Record
Date	Result	Opponent	Event	Location	Method	Round	Time
2022-06-02	Loss	(France) Daren Rolland	IFMA Senior World Championships 2022, Semi Finals	Abu Dhabi, United Arab Emirates	Decision (Unanimous)	3	3:00
Wins the 2022 IFMA World Championships -57kg Bronze Medal.
2022-05-31	Win	(India) Anakkayi Fahad	IFMA Senior World Championships 2022, Quarter Finals	Abu Dhabi, United Arab Emirates	TKO (Body shots)	1	
2022-05-29	Win	(Morocco) Saadi Abdellah	IFMA Senior World Championships 2022, Second Round	Abu Dhabi, United Arab Emirates	Decision (Unanimous)	3	3:00
Legend: Win Loss Draw/No contest Notes
