= Kompatak SinbiMuayThai =

Thai Muay Thai fighter

- Born: Phongsathorn Rueangnoi; October 10, 1998 (age 28); Songkhla, Thailand
- Other names: Kompatak PetchyindeeAcademy; Lemkom Mubansirilak (แหลมคม หมู่บ้านศิริลักษณ์); Kompatak Pakbangkakaw; Kompatak FighterMuayThai
- Height: 173 cm (5 ft 8 in)
- Division: Bantamweight; Super Featherweight
- Style: Muay Thai
- Stance: Orthodox
- Fighting out of: Bangkok, Thailand

Kickboxing record
- Total: 127
- Wins: 101
- Losses: 24
- Draws: 2

Phongsathorn Rueangnoi (born October 10, 1998), known professionally as Kompatak SinbiMuayThai (Thai: คมปฏัก ซินบีมวยไทย), is a Thai Muay Thai fighter. He is a former Rajadamnern Stadium Super Featherweight Champion

He was also in the shortlist for the 2018-2019 Sports Writers of Thailand Fighter of the Year award.

== Titles and accomplishments ==
- Rajadamnern Stadium
  - 2024 Rajadamnern Stadium Super Featherweight (130 lbs) Champion
- True4U Petchyindee
  - 2016 CP Million Tournament Bantamweight (118 lbs) Winner
  - 2022 True4U Super Featherweight (130 lbs) Champion (1 defense)
- International Federation of Muaythai Associations
  - 2022 IFMA World Championships −60 kg (gold)
  - 2023 IFMA World Championships −60 kg (silver)
  - 2023 IFMA World Championships −60 kg (gold) (reallocated)

Awards

- Sports Authority of Thailand (SAT)
  - 2017 Preservation of Outstanding Muay Thai Technique Award

== Fight record ==
Muay Thai Record
101 Wins, 26 Losses, 3 Draws
Date	Result	Opponent	Event	Location	Method	Round	Time
2025-06-10	Loss	(Thailand) Yodtong KiatNavy	Muaymansananmuang	Chonburi, Thailand	Decision	5	3:00
Loses the True4U/PRYDE TV 130 lbs title.
2025-05-03	Loss	(Thailand) Somraknoi Muayded 789	Mother Land of Muay Thai, Muang Chaiyaphum Stadium	Chaiyaphum province, Thailand	Decision	5	3:00
2025-03-06	Win	(Thailand) Tongnoi Wor.Sangprapai	Pryde TV + Petchyindee, Rajadamnern Stadium	Bangkok, Thailand	Decision	5	3:00
2024-12-26	Loss	(Thailand) Decho Por.Borirak	Petchyindee + Pryde TV, Rajadamnern Stadium	Bangkok, Thailand	Decision	5	3:00
2024-08-23	Win	(Thailand) Somraknoi Muayded 789	Konkraeng Muay Thai Muang Chakangraw + Muaymanwansuk, Kamphaengphet Stadium	Kamphaeng Phet province, Thailand	Decision	5	3:00
2024-07-13	Loss	(Thailand) Tongnoi Wor.Sangprapai	Pitaktam Super Fight + Sor.Sommai + Petchyindee	Songkhla province, Thailand	Decision	5	3:00
2024-06-08	Loss	(Thailand) Chalam Parunchai	Rajadamnern World Series	Bangkok, Thailand	Decision (Unanimous)	5	3:00
Loses the Rajadamnern Stadium Super Featherweight (130 lbs) title.
2024-04-13	Win	(Thailand) Somraknoi Muayded 789	Rajadamnern World Series	Bangkok, Thailand	Decision (Unanimous)	5	3:00
Wins the vacant Rajadamnern Stadium Super Featherweight (130 lbs) title.
2024-02-13	Win	(Thailand) Tongnoi Wor.Sangprapai	Muaymansananmuang Mahasarakham	Maha Sarakham province, Thailand	Decision	5	3:00
2023-12-29	Win	(Thailand) Thanupetch Wor.Sangprapai	Matuphum Muay Thai + Petchyindee	Songkhla Province, Thailand	Decision	5	3:00
2023-11-21	Win	(Thailand) Thanupetch Wor.Sangprapai	Muaymansananmuang, Rangsit Stadium	Pathum Thani, Thailand	Decision	5	3:00
Defends True4U 130 lbs title.
2023-09-28	Loss	(Thailand) Thanupetch Wor.Sangprapai	Wan Ittipon Mahasakun, Rajadamnern Stadium	Bangkok, Thailand	Decision	5	3:00
2023-08-25	Draw	(Thailand) ET Tded99	Rakya Suwitee Tin Thai Nai Din Daen Muang Kwan Phayao + Muaymanwansuk + Petchyindee	Kwan Phayao, Thailand	Decision	5	3:00
2023-07-06	Win	(Thailand) Somraknoi Muayded789	Petchyindee, Rajadamnern Stadium	Bangkok, Thailand	Decision	5	3:00
2023-04-11	Win	(Thailand) Samingdet Nor.Anuwatgym	Muaymansananmuang Mahasarakham	Maha Sarakham province, Thailand	Decision	5	3:00
2023-03-11	Loss	(Thailand) Petchdam Petchyindee Academy	RWS + Petchyindee, Rajadamnern Stadium	Bangkok, Thailand	Decision (Split)	3	3:00
2023-01-28	Win	(Thailand) Tongnoi Wor.Sangprapai	Suek Muay Mahakuson Samakom Chao Paktai	Bangkok, Thailand	Decision	5	3:00
2022-11-18	Win	(Thailand) Phetsukumvit Boybangna	Ruamponkon + Prachin	Prachinburi province, Thailand	Decision	5	3:00
2022-10-20	Loss	(Thailand) Tongnoi Wor.Sangprapai	Petchyindee, Rajadamnern Stadium	Bangkok, Thailand	Decision	5	3:00
2022-09-18	Loss	(Thailand) Chorfah Tor.Sangtiennoi	Suek Muay Thai Witee Tin Thai Muang Nam Dam	Kalasin province, Thailand	Decision (Split)	5	3:00
2022-08-02	Win	(Thailand) Kongthoranee Sor.Sommai	Birthday Pitaktham Super Fight	Songkhla province, Thailand	Decision	5	3:00
2022-07-01	Win	(Thailand) Samingdet Nor.Anuwatgym	True4U Muaymanwansuk, Rangsit Stadium	Pathum Thani, Thailand	Decision	5	3:00
Wins True4U 130 lbs title.
2022-04-16	Win	(Thailand) Kongthoranee Sor.Sommai	Sor.Sommai + Pitaktham	Phayao province, Thailand	Decision	5	3:00
2022-03-25	Win	(Thailand) Chorfah Tor.Sangtiennoi	Muaymanwansuk, Rangsit Stadium	Bangkok, Thailand	Decision	5	3:00
2022-02-11	Loss	(Thailand) Samingdet Nor.Anuwatgym	True4U Muaymanwansuk, Rangsit Stadium	Pathum Thani, Thailand	Decision	5	3:00
For the vacant True4U 130 lbs title.
2021-11-26	Win	(Thailand) Chorfah Tor.Sangtiennoi	Muay Thai Moradok Kon Thai + Rajadamnern Super Fight	Buriram, Thailand	Decision	5	3:00
2021-10-14	Loss	(Thailand) Kiewpayak Jitmuangnon	Petchyindee + Muay Thai Moradok Kon Thai	Buriram Province, Thailand	Decision	5	3:00
2021-04-09	Win	(Thailand) Kiewpayak Jitmuangnon	Muaymanwansuk Road Show	Songkhla, Thailand	Decision	5	3:00
2021-03-11	Win	(Thailand) Samingdet Nor.Anuwatgym	True4U Muaymanwansuk, Rangsit Stadium	Pathum Thani, Thailand	Decision	5	3:00
2020-12-18	Loss	(Thailand) ET Tded99	Singmawynn + MahaVajiravudh	Songkhla province, Thailand	KO (Flying knee)	3	
2020-11-22	Loss	(Thailand) ET Tded99	Channel 7 Stadium	Bangkok, Thailand	Decision	5	3:00
For the Channel 7 Stadium 130 lbs title.
2020-07-26	Loss	(Thailand) View Petchkoson	Channel 7 Stadium	Bangkok, Thailand	Decision	5	3:00
2020-01-31	Win	(Thailand) Worawut MUden	Phuket Super Fight Real Muay Thai	Mueang Phuket District, Thailand	Decision	5	3:00
2019-12-19	Win	(Thailand) Petchsoontri Jitmuangnon	Jitmuangnon, Rajadamnern Stadium	Bangkok, Thailand	Decision	5	3:00
2019-10-29	Loss	(Thailand) Kongthoranee Sor.Sommai	Sangmorakot, Lumpinee Stadium	Bangkok, Thailand	Decision	5	3:00
2019-09-24	Win	(Thailand) Pompetch Sitnumnoi	Petchnumnoi + Prestige Fight, Lumpinee Stadium	Bangkok, Thailand	Decision	5	3:00
2019-08-07	Loss	(Thailand) Kiewpayak Jitmuangnon	Jitmuangnon, Rajadamnern Stadium	Bangkok, Thailand	Decision	5	3:00
2019-06-06	Win	(Thailand) Suriyanlek Por.Yenying	OneSongchai, Rajadamnern Stadium	Bangkok, Thailand	Decision	5	3:00
2019-05-09	Win	(Thailand) Yothin FA Group	Petchyindee, Rajadamnern Stadium	Bangkok, Thailand	Decision	5	3:00
2019-03-28	Win	(Thailand) Petchrung Sitnayokgaipadriew	Onesongchai, Rajadamnern Stadium	Bangkok, Thailand	Decision	5	3:00
2019-02-28	Loss	(Thailand) Kiewpayak Jitmuangnon	PetchChaoPhraya, Rajadamnern Stadium	Bangkok, Thailand	Decision	5	3:00
2019-02-01	Win	(Thailand) Yothin FA Group	True4U Muaymanwansuk + Petchpiya, Lumpinee Stadium	Bangkok, Thailand	Decision	5	3:00
2018-12-26	Win	(Thailand) Somraknoi Muayded789	Petchyindee + One Championship, Rajadamnern Stadium 73rd Anniversary	Bangkok, Thailand	Decision	5	3:00
2018-11-21	Loss	(Thailand) Petchrung Sitnayokgaipadriew	Onesongchai, Rajadamnern Stadium	Bangkok, Thailand	Decision	5	3:00
2018-09-20	Win	(Thailand) Morakot Petchseemuen	Onesongchai, Rajadamnern Stadium	Bangkok, Thailand	Decision	5	3:00
2018-08-30	Win	(Thailand) Petchrung Sitnayokgaipadriew	Onesongchai, Rajadamnern Stadium	Bangkok, Thailand	Decision	5	3:00
2018-07-26	Win	(Thailand) Pichitchai PKsaenchaimuaythaigym	Onesongchai, Rajadamnern Stadium	Bangkok, Thailand	Decision	5	3:00
2018-06-06	Win	(Thailand) Prajanban SorJor.Vichitpaedriw	Onesongchai, Rajadamnern Stadium	Bangkok, Thailand	Decision	5	3:00
2018-05-03	Loss	(Thailand) Prajanban SorJor.Vichitpaedriw	Onesongchai, Rajadamnern Stadium	Bangkok, Thailand	Decision	5	3:00
2018-04-02	Win	(Thailand) Hanpon Gor.Suwantat	Onesongchai, Rajadamnern Stadium	Bangkok, Thailand	Decision	5	3:00
2018-03-05	Loss	(Thailand) Petchrung Sitnayokgaipadriew	Onesongchai, Rajadamnern Stadium	Bangkok, Thailand	Decision	5	3:00
2017-11-28	Win	(Thailand) Puenkon Tor.Surat	Onesongchai, Lumpinee Stadium	Bangkok, Thailand	KO (High Kick)	1	
2017-11-02	Win	(Thailand) Kumandoi Petcharoenvit	Onesongchai, Rajadamnern Stadium	Bangkok, Thailand	KO (High Kick)	3	
2017-07-13	Loss	(Thailand) Padetseuk Gor.Gampanat	Onesongchai, Rajadamnern Stadium	Bangkok, Thailand	Decision	5	3:00
2017-06-15	Win	(Thailand) Yodkhuntap Sor.Gor.Sue-NgaiGym	Onesongchai, Rajadamnern Stadium	Bangkok, Thailand	Decision	5	3:00
2017-03-19	Win	(Thailand) Masuklek Ror.Kelacorath	Rangsit Stadium	Rangsit, Thailand	Decision	5	3:00
2017-02-05	Win	(Thailand) Roichoeng Singmawin	Rangsit Stadium	Rangsit, Thailand	Decision	5	3:00
2016-12-10	Loss	(Thailand) Suriyanlek Or.Bor.Tor.Kampee	Montri Studio	Bangkok, Thailand	KO	3	
2016-10-13	Win	(Thailand) Phetsoontri Jitmuangnon	Rajadamnern Stadium	Bangkok, Thailand	Decision	5	3:00
2016-09-05	Loss	(Thailand) Yothin FA Group	Rajadamnern Stadium	Bangkok, Thailand	Decision	5	3:00
For the WMC World 118 lbs title.
2016-08-05	Win	(Thailand) Thepwarit RawaiMuayThai	True4U, Rangsit Stadium	Rangsit, Thailand	Decision	5	3:00
Wins CP Million Tournament 118 lbs title.
2016-06-20	Win	(Thailand) Achanai PetchyindeeAcademy	Rajadamnern Stadium	Bangkok, Thailand	Decision	5	3:00
2016-05-14	Win	(Thailand) Rungkit Wor.Sanprapai	True4U, Rangsit Stadium	Rangsit, Thailand	Decision	5	3:00
2016-03-05	Win	(Thailand) Yothin FA Group	True4U, Rangsit Stadium	Rangsit, Thailand	KO	4	
2016-02-13	Win	(Thailand) Thepwarit RawaiMuayThai		Phetchaburi Province, Thailand	Decision	5	3:00
2016-01-16	Win	(Thailand) Khongfak Sitpuphandom		Phetchaburi Province, Thailand	Decision	5	3:00
2015-12-13	Win	(Thailand) Khongfak Sitpuphandom	Ladprao Stadium	Thailand	Decision	5	3:00
2015-10-11	Loss	(Thailand) Veeraponlek Wor.Wanchai	Ladprao Stadium	Thailand	Decision	5	3:00
2015-09-20	Loss	(Thailand) Yod ET Teded99	Ladprao Stadium	Thailand	Decision	5	3:00
2015-08-21	Loss	(Thailand) Nongyot Sitjekan	Lumpinee Stadium	Bangkok, Thailand	Decision	5	3:00
2015-07-08	Loss	(Thailand) Phetwason Or.Daokrajai	Rajadamnern Stadium	Bangkok, Thailand	Decision	5	3:00
2015-06-03	Loss	(Thailand) Nongyot Sitjekan	Rajadamnern Stadium	Bangkok, Thailand	Decision	5	3:00
2015-03-25	Win	(Thailand) Achanai PetchyindeeAcademy	Rajadamnern Stadium	Bangkok, Thailand	Decision	5	3:00
2015-02-18	Win	(Thailand) Sendet Muangnongbua	Rajadamnern Stadium	Bangkok, Thailand	Decision	5	3:00
2015-01-25	Win	(Thailand) Phetchiangkwan Nayoksomdet	Rajadamnern Stadium	Bangkok, Thailand	Decision	5	3:00
Legend: Win Loss Draw/No contest Notes

Amateur Muay Thai Record
Date	Result	Opponent	Event	Location	Method	Round	Time
2023-05-12	NC	(Russia) Asadula Imangazaliev	IFMA Senior World Championships 2023, Final	Bangkok, Thailand	Decision (29:28)	3	3:00
Originally a decision win for Imangazaliev later overturned following a positive PED test by Imangazaliev. Kompatak wins 2023 IFMA World Championships -60kg Gold medal
2023-05-10	Win	(France) Florent Louis Joseph	IFMA Senior World Championships 2023, Semi Final	Bangkok, Thailand	Decision (30:27)	3	3:00
2023-05-08	Win	(Belarus) Daniil Yermolenka	IFMA Senior World Championships 2023, Quarter Final	Bangkok, Thailand	Decision (30:27)	3	3:00
2023-05-06	Win	(Afghanistan) Ahmad Shuja Jamal	IFMA Senior World Championships 2023, Second Round	Bangkok, Thailand	Decision (30:27)	3	3:00
2022-06-04	Win	(Kazakhstan) Yernat Smagulov	IFMA Senior World Championships 2022, Final	Abu Dhabi, United Arab Emirates	Decision (Unanimous)	3	3:00
Wins 2022 IFMA World Championships -60kg Gold Medal.
2022-06-02	Win	(Turkey) Serkan Koc	IFMA Senior World Championships 2022, Semi Finals	Abu Dhabi, United Arab Emirates	Decision (Unanimous)	3	3:00
2022-05-31	Win	(Germany) Aldo Leone	IFMA Senior World Championships 2022, Quarter Finals	Abu Dhabi, United Arab Emirates	TKO (Body shot)	2	
2022-05-30	Win	(Libya) Mohamed Almihdawi	IFMA Senior World Championships 2022, Second Round	Abu Dhabi, United Arab Emirates	KO		
2022-05-28	Win	(Slovakia) Tomas Tadlanek	IFMA Senior World Championships 2022, First Round	Abu Dhabi, United Arab Emirates	Decision (Unanimous)	3	3:00
Legend: Win Loss Draw/No contest Notes
