= Flukenoi Kiatfahlikit =

Thai Muay Thai fighter

Flukenoi
- Born: 2001 (age 24–25); Prakhon Chai district, Buriram province, Thailand
- Other names: Flukenoi Flukbamigiew (ฟลุ๊คน้อย ฟลุ๊คบะหมี่เกี๊ยว); Fluknoi Muayded789 (ฟลุ๊คน้อย มวยเด็ด 789); Fluknoi Musapanmai (ฟลุ๊คน้อย หมูสะพานใหม่); Flukenoi Sor.Jor.Piek-U-Thai
- Height: 172 cm (5 ft 8 in)
- Weight: 61 kg (134 lb; 9.6 st)
- Fighting out of: Bangkok, Thailand
- Team: Kiatfahlikit

Flukenoi Kiatfahlikit (ฟลุ๊คน้อย เกียรติฟ้าลิขิต) is a Thai Muay Thai fighter.

== Muay Thai career ==
Flukenoi started training in Muay Thai at a camp owned by his father, the Kiatfahlikit gym.

On March 19, 2021 Flukenoi faced Dechsakda Sor.Jor Tongprachin at Rangsit Stadium for the True4U Muaymanwansuk promotion. Flukenoi won the fight by decision.

Flukenoi was scheduled to fight Mongkolpetch Petchyindee Academy on a major card in the Buriram province on November 4, 2021. He won the fight by decision.

On February 17, 2022 Flukenoi challenged Petchdam Petchyindee Academy for his True4u 135 lbs title at Rajadamnern Stadium for the Petchyindee promotion. Flukenoi won the fight by decision.

On March 22, 2022 Flukenoi made the first defense of his True4U 135 lbs title against Rungkit Wor.Sanprapai at Rajadamnern Stadium. Flukenoi won the fight by decision.

On May 22, 2022 Flukenoi faced Kimluay SorJor.TongPrachin for the fourth time in three years at Rajadamnern Stadium. Flukenoi was knocked down by an elbow strike in the second round but scored a comeback knockout win in round 4 with a high kick, successfully defending his True4U 135 lbs title for the second time.

On June 20, 2022 Flukenoi extended his undefeated streak to 10 when he was awarded a decision win over the 2021 Sports Authority of Thailand Fighter of the Year Lamnamoonlek Or.Atchariya during a U-Muay and Palangmai co-promoted event at Rajadamnern Stadium.

On December 12, 2023, Flukenoi faced Dam Parunchai for the vacant Channel 7 Stadium 140 lbs title. He lost the fight by technical knockout in the fourth round.

== Titles and accomplishments ==
- Rajadamnern Stadium
  - 2022 Rajadamnern Stadium Fighter of the Year
  - 2025 interim Rajadamnern Stadium Super Lightweight (140 lbs) Champion
- Petchyindee True4U
  - 2022 True4U 135 lbs Champion
    - Two successful title defenses
  - 2024 True4U 140 lbs Champion
- World Muay Thai Council
  - 2016 WMC World 108 lbs Champion

== Fight record ==
Muay Thai Record
Date	Result	Opponent	Event	Location	Method	Round	Time
2026-11-14		(Thailand) Thanupetch Wor.Sangprapai	Rajadamnern World Series	Bangkok, Thailand			
2026-07-17	Win	(Thailand) Chatmungkorn Chor.Hapayak	Palangmai, Rajadamnern Stadium	Bangkok, Thailand	Decision	5	3:00
2026-06-06	Loss	(Thailand) Samingdet Nor.Anuwatgym	Rajadamnern World Series, Rajadamnern Stadium	Bangkok, Thailand	Decision (Unanimous)	5	3:00
For the interim Rajadamnern Stadium Lightweight (135 lbs) title.
2026-05-07	Win	(Thailand) Thanupetch Wor.Sangprapai	Petchyindee, Rajadamnern Stadium	Bangkok, Thailand	Decision	5	3:00
2026-03-14	Win	(Thailand) Moradokpetch PetchyindeeAcademy	Rajadamnern World Series, Rajadamnern Stadium	Bangkok, Thailand	TKO (injury)	3	0:45
2025-11-28	Loss	(Thailand) Rangkhao Wor.Sangprapai	Rajadamnern World Series, Rajadamnern Stadium	Bangkok, Thailand	Decision (Unanimous)	5	3:00
For the interim Rajadamnern Stadium Super Lightweight (140 lbs) title.
2025-09-06	Loss	(Thailand) Dam Parunchai	Rajadamnern World Series, Rajadamnern Stadium	Bangkok, Thailand	Decision (Majority)	5	3:00
For the Rajadamnern Stadium Super Lightweight (140 lbs) title.
2025-06-14	Win	(Thailand) Samingdet Nor.Anuwatgym	Rajadamnern World Series, Rajadamnern Stadium	Bangkok, Thailand	Decision (Unanimous)	5	3:00
Wins the interim Rajadamnern Stadium Super Lightweight (140 lbs) title.
2025-03-16	Win	(Thailand) Jarowadsuk Kiatnavy	Muaydee VitheeThai, Thupatemi Stadium	Pathum Thani, Thailand	KO (Elbow)	2	
2024-12-26	Loss	(Thailand) Thanupetch Wor.Sangprapai	CPF Muaymansananlok + Petchyindee, Rajadamnern Stadium	Bangkok, Thailand	Decision	5	3:00
2024-11-26	Loss	(Thailand) Lamnamoonlek Tded99	Petchyindee x PRYDE TV, Rangsit Stadium	Pathum Thani, Thailand	Decision	5	3:00
2024-10-13	Loss	(Thailand) Phetphuthai Sitsarawatseua	Channel 7 Stadium	Bangkok, Thailand	Decision	5	3:00
2024-09-05	Win	(Thailand) Noppakao PetchyindeeAcademy	Petchyindee, Rajadamnern Stadium	Bangkok, Thailand	Decision	5	3:00
2024-08-06	Win	(Thailand) Kampeetewada Sitthikul	Muaymansananmuang, Rangsit Stadium	Pathum Thani, Thailand	Decision	5	3:00
2024-07-13	Loss	(Thailand) Moradokpetch Muayded789	Pitaktam Super Fight + Sor.Sommai + Petchyindee	Songkhla province, Thailand	Decision	5	3:00
2024-06-11	Win	(Thailand) Moradokpetch Muayded789	Muaymansananmuang, Rangsit Stadium	Pathum Thani, Thailand	Decision	5	3:00
Wins the vacant True4U 140 lbs title
2024-04-25	Win	(Thailand) Chatpet SorJor.Tongprachin	Petchyindee, Rajadamnern Stadium	Bangkok, Thailand	KO (elbow)	3	
2024-02-29	Win	(Thailand) Kampeetewada Sithikul	Petchyindee, Rajadamnern Stadium	Bangkok, Thailand	Decision	5	3:00
2024-02-01	Draw	(Thailand) Kampeetewada Sithikul	Muaymanwansuk, Rangsit Stadium	Pathum Thani, Thailand	Decision (split)	5	3:00
2023-12-10	Loss	(Thailand) Dam Parunchai	Kiatpetch, Channel 7 Stadium	Bangkok, Thailand	TKO	4	
For the vacant Channel 7 Stadium 140 lbs title
2023-10-28	Win	(Thailand) Yok Parunchai	Muay Thai Vithee TinThai + Kiatpetch	Buriram Province, Thailand	Decision	5	3:00
2023-09-07	Win	(Thailand) Moradokpetch Muayded789	Petchyindee, Rajadamnern Stadium	Bangkok, Thailand	Decision	5	3:00
2023-07-30	Win	(Thailand) PetchThongLor Sitluangpinamfon	TorNamThai Kiatpetch TKO, Rajadamnern Stadium	Bangkok, Thailand	Decision	5	3:00
2023-07-02	Win	(Thailand) BigOne TongKubon	Muay Thai Rakya Su Withee Tin Thai	Hat Yai, Thailand	TKO	4	
2023-06-01	Loss	(Thailand) Moradokpetch Muayded789	Petchyindee, Rajadamnern Stadium	Bangkok, Thailand	Decision	5	3:00
2023-04-11	Loss	(Thailand) Extra Rongsamak-OrBorJor.Udon	Muaymansananmuang Mahasarakham	Maha Sarakham province, Thailand	Decision	5	3:00
2023-03-09	Loss	(Thailand) Tongnoi Wor.Sangprapai	Petchyindee, Rajadamnern Stadium	Bangkok, Thailand	Decision	5	3:00
2023-02-16	Loss	(Thailand) Samingdet Nor.Anuwatgym	Petchyindee, Rajadamnern Stadium	Bangkok, Thailand	Decision	5	3:00
2022-12-28	Loss	(Thailand) Petchdam Petchyindee Academy	Muay Thai Rakya Soosakon + SAT Super Fight Withee Tin Thai + Petchyindee	Bangkok, Thailand	Decision (Unanimous)	5	3:00
2022-11-18	Loss	(Thailand) Chalam Parunchai	Ruamponkon + Prachin	Prachinburi province, Thailand	Decision	5	3:00
2022-08-12	Loss	(Italy) Mathias Gallo Cassarino	Rajadamnern World Series	Bangkok, Thailand	Decision (Split)	3	3:00
2022-06-20	Win	(Thailand) Lamnamoonlek Or.Atchariya	U-Muay RuamJaiKonRakMuayThai + Palangmai, Rajadamnern Stadium	Bangkok, Thailand	Decision	5	3:00
2022-05-19	Win	(Thailand) Kimluay SorJor.TongPrachin	Petchyindee, Rajadamnern Stadium	Bangkok, Thailand	TKO (High kick)	4	
Defends the True4U 135 lbs title
2022-03-25	Win	(Thailand) Rungkit Wor.Sanprapai	Muaymanwansuk, Rajadamnern Stadium	Bangkok, Thailand	Decision	5	3:00
Defends the True4U 135 lbs title
2022-02-17	Win	(Thailand) Petchdam Petchyindee Academy	Petchyindee, Rajadamnern Stadium	Bangkok, Thailand	Decision	5	3:00
Wins the True4U 135 lbs title
2022-01-13	Win	(Thailand) Kimluay Sor.Jor Tongprachin	Petchyindee, Rangsit Stadium	Rangsit, Thailand	Decision	5	3:00
2021-12-16	Draw	(Thailand) Samingdet Nor.Anuwatgym	Petchyindee, Rangsit Stadium	Rangsit, Thailand	Decision	5	3:00
2021-11-04	Win	(Thailand) Mongkolpetch Petchyindee Academy	Petchyindee + Muay Thai Moradok Kon Thai	Buriram Province, Thailand	Decision	5	3:00
2021-10-17	Win	(Thailand) Moradokpetch Muayded789	Petchyindee, Rangsit Stadium	Rangsit, Thailand	Decision	5	3:00
2021-03-19	Win	(Thailand) Dechsakda Sor.Jor Tongprachin	True4U Muaymanwansuk, Rangsit Stadium	Rangsit, Thailand	Decision	5	3:00
2020-12-18	Win	(Thailand) Denputhai Kiatmoo9	Muaymanwansuk, Rangsit Stadium	Rangsit, Thailand	Decision	5	3:00
2020-10-30	Loss	(Thailand) Saksit Tor.Paopiamsapraedriew	Muaymanwansuk, Rangsit Stadium	Rangsit, Thailand	Decision	5	3:00
2020-09-22	Loss	(Thailand) Rittidet Sitchefboontham	ChefBoontham, Thanakorn Stadium	Thailand	Decision	5	3:00
2020-08-21	Win	(Thailand) Nawaek Sitchefboontham	Muaymanwansuk, Rangsit Stadium	Rangsit, Thailand	Decision	5	3:00
2020-07-24	Win	(Thailand) Kimluay Santi-Ubon	Muaymanwansuk, Rangsit Stadium	Rangsit, Thailand	KO	3	
2020-03-09	Win	(Thailand) Surachai Nayyoksanya	Palangmai, Rajadamnern Stadium	Bangkok, Thailand	Decision	5	3:00
2020-02-14	Win	(Thailand) Soodlow Petchbanpar	True4U Muaymanwansuk + Petchnumnoi, Lumpinee Stadium	Bangkok, Thailand	TKO (Knees + elbow)	2	
2019-10-24	Loss	(Thailand) Samingdet Nor.Anuwatgym	Wan Kingthong, Rajadamnern Stadium	Bangkok, Thailand	KO (Left elbow)	4	
2019-09-11	Win	(Thailand) Saksit Tor.Paopiamsapraedriew	Wan Kingthong, Rajadamnern Stadium	Bangkok, Thailand	Decision	5	3:00
2019-08-05	Loss	(Thailand) Tongnoi Lukbanyai	Petchyindee, Rajadamnern Stadium	Bangkok, Thailand	Decision	5	3:00
2019-07-05	Win	(Thailand) Denputhai Kiatmoo9	Petchypiya, Lumpinee Stadium	Bangkok, Thailand	KO (Elbow)	3	
2019-06-07	Win	(Thailand) Dansiam Kudramgym	Petchypiya, Lumpinee Stadium	Bangkok, Thailand	Decision	5	3:00
2019-04-05	Win	(Thailand) Dodo Mor.Rachapatmunbanchombung	Petchypiya, Lumpinee Stadium	Bangkok, Thailand	Decision	5	3:00
2019-03-01	Draw	(Thailand) Tongnoi Lukbanyai	Petchpiya, Lumpinee Stadium	Bangkok, Thailand	Decision	5	3:00
2019-01-04	Loss	(Thailand) Kimluay Santi-Ubon	Petchpiya, Lumpinee Stadium	Bangkok, Thailand	Decision	5	3:00
2018-11-26	Loss	(Thailand) Padejsuk Kor.Kampanat	Wanmeechai, Rajadamnern Stadium	Bangkok, Thailand	Decision	5	3:00
2018-08-29	Loss	(Thailand) Phetpangan Mor.Ratanabandit	Petchaopraya, Rajadamnern Stadium	Bangkok, Thailand	Decision	5	3:00
2018-07-30	Win	(Thailand) Denputhai Kiatmoo9	Petchyindee, Rajadamnern Stadium	Bangkok, Thailand	KO (Right cross)	2	
2018-07-13	Win	(Thailand) Klassik Sitkrusawan	Muaymanwansuk, Rangsit Stadium	Rangsit, Thailand	KO (Right elbow)	3	
2018-04-30	Loss	(Thailand) Padejsuk Kor.Kampanat	Petchyindee, Rajadamnern Stadium	Bangkok, Thailand	Decision	5	3:00
2018-03-19	Win	(Thailand) Detchaiya Petchyindee	Wan Kingthong, Rajadamnern Stadium	Bangkok, Thailand	KO	3	
2018-02-16	Win	(Thailand) Kempetch Phunphanmuang	Muaymanwansuk, Rangsit Stadium	Rangsit, Thailand	TKO (Referee stoppage)	4	
2017-11-10	Loss	(Thailand) Yimsiam Nakhonmuangdej	Muaymanwansuk, Rangsit Stadium	Rangsit, Thailand	Decision	5	3:00
2017-09-29	Win	(Thailand) Ekthoranin Mor.Krungtepthonburi	Muaymanwansuk, Rangsit Stadium	Rangsit, Thailand	Decision	5	3:00
2017-09-01	Win	(Thailand) Bigboom Bemdeside	Muaymanwansuk, Rangsit Stadium	Rangsit, Thailand	Decision	5	3:00
2017-08-11	Win	(Thailand) Weeraponlek Wor Wanchai	Muaymanwansuk, Rangsit Stadium	Rangsit, Thailand	Decision	5	3:00
2017-06-23	Loss	(Thailand) Bigboom Bemdeside	Muaymanwansuk, Rangsit Stadium	Rangsit, Thailand	Decision	5	3:00
2017-05-11	Win	(Thailand) Akemongkon Nor.Anuwatgym	Wanmeechai, Rajadamnern Stadium	Bangkok, Thailand	Decision	5	3:00
2017-04-12	Loss	(Thailand) Weeraponlek Wor Wanchai	Wan Kingthong, Rajadamnern Stadium	Bangkok, Thailand	Decision	5	3:00
2017-02-24	Loss	(Thailand) Boonlong Petchyindee	Muaymanwansuk, Rangsit Stadium	Rangsit, Thailand	Decision	5	3:00
2017-01-18	Win	(Thailand) Akemongkon Nor.Anuwatgym	Wan Kingthong, Rajadamnern Stadium	Bangkok, Thailand	Decision	5	3:00
2016-12-05	Win	(Thailand) Sinprathai Priewwayo	Wan Kingthong, Rajadamnern Stadium	Bangkok, Thailand	Decision	5	3:00
2016-11-14	Win	(Japan) Kaito Wor.Wanchai	Wan Kingthong + Phetwiset, Rajadamnern Stadium	Bangkok, Thailand	Decision	5	3:00
2016-10-05	Loss	(Thailand) Sinprathai Priewwayo	Wan Kingthong, Rajadamnern Stadium	Bangkok, Thailand	Decision	5	3:00
2016-08-26	Win	(Thailand) Wattana MTM Academy	Muaymanwansuk, Rangsit Stadium	Rangsit, Thailand	Decision	5	3:00
2016-06-10	Win	(Thailand) Numtrungnoi Singpomprab	Weerapol, Lumpinee Stadium	Bangkok, Thailand	Decision	5	3:00
Wins WMC World 108 lbs title
2016-05-13	Win	(Thailand) Nuathoranee Jitmuangnon	Phiranan, Lumpinee Stadium	Bangkok, Thailand	Decision	5	3:00
2016-04-19	Win	(Thailand) Rattanaphon Sitthongpon	Weerapol, Lumpinee Stadium	Bangkok, Thailand	Decision	5	3:00
2016-03-18	Win	(Thailand) Dodo Mor.Rachapatmubanchombung	Lumpinee Stadium	Bangkok, Thailand	Decision	5	3:00
2015-09-20	Win	(Thailand) Sungfah Nor.Anuwatgym	Muay Dee Vithithai, Rangsit Stadium	Rangsit, Thailand	Decision	5	3:00
2015-08-17	Win	(Thailand) Fahsanchai Thanasuranakorn	Petchyindee, Lumpinee Stadium	Bangkok, Thailand	TKO (Knees to the body)	4	
2015-07-24	Win	(Thailand) Mongkolsap Wongklasuek	Petchyindee, Lumpinee Stadium	Bangkok, Thailand	KO	2	
Legend: Win Loss Draw/No contest Notes
