= Samingdet Nor.Anuwatgym =

Thai Muay Thai fighter

- Born: Sirichai Chaiyaporn; June 9, 1999 (age 27); Udon Thani, Thailand
- Native name: ศิริชัย ชัยยาภรณ์
- Other names: Samingdet Sor.Chaikon; Samingdet Bangmadklongtan
- Height: 173 cm (5 ft 8 in)
- Division: Mini Flyweight; Bantamweight; Super Featherweight; Lightweight
- Style: Muay Thai (Muay Femur)
- Stance: Southpaw
- Fighting out of: Bangkok, Thailand
- Team: Nor.Anuwat Gym
- Years active: 2015 - present

Kickboxing record
- Total: 134
- Wins: 85
- Losses: 44
- Draws: 5

Sirichai Chaiyaporn (Thai: ศิริชัย ชัยยาภรณ์; born June 9, 1999), known professionally as Samingdet Nor.Anuwatgym (Thai: สมิงเดช น.อนุวัฒน์ยิม, is a Thai Muay Thai fighter. He is the current Rajadamnern Stadium Lightweight Champion, former Rajadamnern Stadium Super Featherweight Champion, and former WBC Muay Thai World Super Featherweight Champion.

As of October 2024, he is ranked #2 and #5 at Lightweight in Muay Thai according to the World Muaythai Organization (WMO) and Combat Press respectively.

== Muay Thai career ==
In April 2019, he took on the #6 ranked Lumpini bantamweight Detchaiya Petchyindee at the Rajadamnern Stadium. Samingdet won the fight by a third round TKO.

Samingdet fought for the 118lbs True4u Muaymumwansuek title against Yothin FA Group in August 2019. The fight ended in a decision draw.

Samingdet was scheduled to fight Dechsakda Sor-Jor Tongprajin in the Rangsit Stadium for the vacant WBC Muaythai World Super Featherweight title in July 2020. The fight was cancelled as Dechsakda had complications cutting weight, and had to be transported to the hospital. The fight was rescheduled for September 2020. He put in a dominating performance, winning the first two rounds 10-9 on the judges' scorecards, before knocking Dechsakda out in the third round with a left elbow.

== Titles and accomplishments ==
- World Boxing Council Muay Thai
  - 2020 WBC Muay Thai World Featherweight (130 lbs) Champion
- Rajadamnern Stadium
  - 2020 Rajadamnern Stadium Super Featherweight (130 lbs) Champion
  - 2023 Rajadamnern World Series Lightweight (135 lbs) Runner-up
  - 2024 Rajadamnern Stadium Lightweight (135 lbs) Champion
    - Three successful title defenses
  - 2026 interim Rajadamnern Stadium Lightweight (135 lbs) Champion
    - Two successful title defenses
- True4U Petchyindee
  - 2022 True4U Super Featherweight (130 lbs) Champion
- Channel 7 Stadium
  - 2026 Channel 7 Stadium Lightweight (135 lbs) Champion
- International Federation of Muaythai Associations
  - 2021 IFMA World Championships U-23 −63.5 kg (bronze)

== Fight record ==
Muay Thai Record
Date	Result	Opponent	Event	Location	Method	Round	Time
2026-12-05		(Japan) Kan Nakamura	Rajadamnern World Series	Bangkok, Thailand			
For the Rajadamnern Stadium Lightweight (135 lbs) title.
2026-10-17	Win	(Thailand) Kiewpayak Jitmuangnon	Rajadamnern World Series, Rajadamnern Stadium	Bangkok, Thailand	Decision (Split)	5	3:00
Defends the interim Rajadamnern Stadium Lightweight (135 lbs) title.
2026-08-15	Win	(Thailand) Duangsompong Jitmuangnon	Rajadamnern World Series, Rajadamnern Stadium	Bangkok, Thailand	Decision (Unanimous)	5	3:00
Defends the interim Rajadamnern Stadium Lightweight (135 lbs) title.
2026-06-06	Win	(Thailand) Flukenoi Kiatfahlikit	Rajadamnern World Series, Rajadamnern Stadium	Bangkok, Thailand	Decision (Unanimous)	5	3:00
Wins the interim Rajadamnern Stadium Lightweight (135 lbs) title.
2026-03-21	Win	(China) Qin Zhenjie	Rajadamnern World Series	Bangkok, Thailand	KO (High kick)	1	1:14
2026-02-07	Win	(Thailand) Superlek Jitmuangnon	Channel 7 Stadium	Bangkok, Thailand	Decision	5	3:00
Wins the Channel 7 Stadium Lightweight (135 lbs) title.
2025-12-14	Draw	(Thailand) Superlek Jitmuangnon	Channel 7 Stadium	Bangkok, Thailand	Decision	5	3:00
For the Channel 7 Stadium Lightweight (135 lbs) title.
2025-11-02	Win	(Thailand) NongBew Jitmuangnon	Channel 7 Stadium	Bangkok, Thailand	KO	2	
2025-08-30	Loss	(Thailand) Duangsompong Jitmuangnon	Rajadamnern World Series, Rajadamnern Stadium	Bangkok, Thailand	Decision (Unanimous)	3	3:00
2025-06-14	Loss	(Thailand) Flukenoi Kiatfahlikit	Rajadamnern World Series, Rajadamnern Stadium	Bangkok, Thailand	Decision (Unanimous)	5	3:00
For the interim Rajadamnern Stadium Super Lightweight (140 lbs) title.
2025-05-03	Win	(Spain) Juan David Rios	Rajadamnern World Series	Bangkok, Thailand	KO (Elbow)	2	0:30
2024-11-30	Win	(Cyprus) Savvas Michael	Rajadamnern World Series	Bangkok, Thailand	Decision (Split)	5	3:00
Defends the Rajadamnern Stadium Lightweight (135 lbs) title.
2024-10-10	Loss	(Thailand) Lamnamoonlek Tded99	Petchyindee, Rajadamnern Stadium	Bangkok, Thailand	Decision	5	3:00
2024-08-11	Win	(Thailand) Jaruadsuek SorJor.VichitPadriew	Muaydee VitheeThai, Thupatemi Stadium	Pathum Thani, Thailand	Decision	5	3:00
2024-07-13	Win	(Cyprus) Savvas Michael	Rajadamnern World Series	Bangkok, Thailand	Decision (Unanimous)	5	3:00
Defends the Rajadamnern Stadium Lightweight (135 lbs) title.
2024-05-25	Win	(Thailand) Thongnoi Wor.Sangprapai	Rajadamnern World Series	Bangkok, Thailand	Decision (Unanimous)	5	3:00
Defends the Rajadamnern Stadium Lightweight (135 lbs) title.
2024-04-18	Win	(Thailand) Thanupetch Wor.Sangprapai	Petchyindee, Rajadamnern Stadium	Bangkok, Thailand	Decision	5	3:00
2024-03-23	Win	(Thailand) Jom Parunchai	Rajadamnern World Series	Bangkok, Thailand	Decision (Unanimous)	5	3:00
Wins the Rajadamnern Stadium Lightweight (135 lbs) title.
2024-02-12	Win	(Japan) Yota Shigemori	Rajadamnern World Series Japan	Tokyo, Japan	Decision (Unanimous)	3	3:00
2023-12-27	Draw	(Thailand) Chalam Parunchai	Rajadamnern Stadium 78th Birthday Show	Bangkok, Thailand	Decision	5	3:00
2023-09-30	Loss	(Thailand) Lamnamoonlek Tded99	Rajadamnern World Series - Final	Bangkok, Thailand	Decision (Unanimous)	5	3:00
For the 2023 Rajadamnern World Series 135 lbs title.
2023-08-26	Win	(Thailand) Petchdam Petchyindee Academy	Rajadamnern World Series - Final 4	Bangkok, Thailand	Decision (Unanimous)	3	3:00
2023-07-22	Win	(Morocco) Diae Bezhad Warrior Academy	Rajadamnern World Series - Group Stage	Bangkok, Thailand	Decision (Unanimous)	3	3:00
2023-06-17	Loss	(Thailand) Lamnamoonlek Or.Atchariya	Rajadamnern World Series - Group Stage	Bangkok, Thailand	Decision (Unanimous)	3	3:00
2023-05-13	Win	(Japan) Renta Wor.Wanchai	Rajadamnern World Series - Group Stage	Bangkok, Thailand	Decision (Unanimous)	3	3:00
2023-04-11	Loss	(Thailand) Kompatak SinbiMuayThai	Muaymansananmuang Mahasarakham	Maha Sarakham province, Thailand	Decision	5	3:00
2023-02-27	Win	(Cambodia) Khim Bora	Kun Khmer All Star	Phnom Penh, Cambodia	Decision	3	3:00
2023-02-16	Win	(Thailand) Flukenoi Kiatfahlikit	Petchyindee, Rajadamnern Stadium	Bangkok, Thailand	Decision	5	3:00
2022-11-12	Loss	(Thailand) Thongnoi Wor.Sangprapai	Muay Thai Vithee Tin Thai + Petchyindee Sanjorn	Chiang Rai province, Thailand	KO	5	
2022-10-21	Win	(Thailand) NuengUbon Or.Atchariya	Muaymanwansuk, Rangsit Stadium	Pathum Thani, Thailand	KO (Elbows)	3	
2022-09-17	Win	(Thailand) Songkom Bangkokalaiyon	Muay Thai Witee Tin Thai Muang Nam Dam	Kalasin Province, Thailand	KO (Left Elbow)	3	
2022-07-01	Loss	(Thailand) Kompatak Or.Atchariya	True4U Muaymanwansuk, Rangsit Stadium	Pathum Thani, Thailand	Decision	5	3:00
Loses True4U 130 lbs title.
2022-05-12	Loss	(Thailand) Chorfah Tor.Sangtiennoi	Petchyindee, Rajadamnern Stadium	Bangkok, Thailand	Decision	5	3:00
2022-03-24	Loss	(France) Nabil VenumMuayThai	Petchyindee, Rajadamnern Stadium	Bangkok, Thailand	Decision	5	3:00
2022-02-11	Win	(Thailand) Kompatak Or.Atchariya	True4U Muaymanwansuk, Rangsit Stadium	Pathum Thani, Thailand	Decision	5	3:00
Wins the vacant True4U 130 lbs title.
2021-12-16	Draw	(Thailand) Flukenoi Kiatfahlikit	Petchyindee, Rangsit Stadium	Rangsit, Thailand	Decision	5	3:00
2021-03-11	Loss	(Thailand) Kompatak SinbiMuayThai	True4U Muaymanwansuk, Rangsit Stadium	Pathum Thani, Thailand	Decision	5	3:00
2020-10-23	Loss	(Thailand) Rangkhao Wor.Sangprapai	True4U Muaymanwansuk, Rangsit Stadium	Pathum Thani, Thailand	Decision	5	3:00
2020-09-18	Win	(Thailand) Dechsakda Sor-Jor Tongprajin	Petchyindee, Rangsit Stadium	Pathum Thani, Thailand	KO (Left Elbow)	3	
Wins WBC Muay Thai World 130 lbs title.
2020-07-10	Win	(Thailand) Thanapetch Wor.Sangprapai	True4U Muaymanwansuk, Rangsit Stadium	Pathum Thani, Thailand	Decision	5	3:00
2020-01-31	Loss	(Thailand) Pompetch Sor.Samakphong	Phuket Super Fight Real Muay Thai	Mueang Phuket District, Thailand	Decision	5	3:00
2020-01-02	Win	(Thailand) Thanapetch Wor.Sangprapai	Rajadamnern Stadium	Bangkok, Thailand	KO (Left Elbow)	3	
Wins Rajadamnern Stadium 130 lbs title.
2019-11-21	Win	(Thailand) Yothin FA Group	Rajadamnern Stadium	Bangkok, Thailand	Decision	5	3:00
2019-10-24	Win	(Thailand) Flukenoi Muayded789	Rajadamnern Stadium	Bangkok, Thailand	KO (Left Elbow)	4	
2019-10-03	Loss	(Thailand) Yothin FA Group	Rajadamnern Stadium	Bangkok, Thailand	Decision	5	3:00
2019-08-09	Draw	(Thailand) Yothin FA Group	Petchyindee True4U Lumpinee Stadium	Bangkok, Thailand	Decision	5	3:00
For The 118lbs True4u Muaymumwansuek title.
2019-06-13	Win	(Thailand) Detchaiya PetchyindeeAcademy	Rajadamnern Stadium	Bangkok, Thailand	TKO (Right Elbow)	3	
2019-04-04	Win	(Thailand) Puenkol Diamond98	Rajadamnern Stadium	Bangkok, Thailand	Decision	5	3:00
Wins the 3 Million baht side-bet.
2019-03-01	Loss	(Thailand) Boonlong PetchyindeeAcademy	Lumpinee Stadium	Bangkok, Thailand	Decision	5	3:00
2019-01-30	Draw	(Thailand) Kimluay Santi-Ubon	Lumpinee Stadium	Bangkok, Thailand	Decision	5	3:00
2018-12-26	Win	(Thailand) Boonlong PetchyindeeAcademy	Rajadamnern Stadium	Bangkok, Thailand	Decision	5	3:00
2018-11-26	Win	(Thailand) Thongnoi Lukbanyai	Rajadamnern Stadium	Bangkok, Thailand	KO (Left High Kick)	4	
2018-10-10	Win	(Thailand) Thongnoi Lukbanyai	Rajadamnern Stadium	Bangkok, Thailand	KO (Left Elbow)	3	
2018-09-13	Win	(Thailand) Kimluay Santi-Ubon	Rajadamnern Stadium	Bangkok, Thailand	Decision	5	3:00
2018-08-17	Win	(Thailand) Yodwitthaya Sor.Sirilak	Rajadamnern Stadium	Bangkok, Thailand	Decision	5	3:00
2018-07-06	Win	(Thailand) Kaemphet Pumphanmuang	Rajadamnern Stadium	Bangkok, Thailand	Decision	5	3:00
2018-04-09	Loss	(Thailand) Saenson Erawan	Rajadamnern Stadium	Bangkok, Thailand	KO (Knees to the thigh)	4	
2018-01-10	Loss	(Thailand) Thongnoi Lukbanyai	Rajadamnern Stadium	Bangkok, Thailand	Decision	5	3:00
2017-12-01	Loss	(Thailand) Yokmorakot Wor.Sangpapai	Rajadamnern Stadium	Bangkok, Thailand	TKO (Doctor Stoppage)	4	
2017-11-10	Win	(Thailand) Thongnoi Lukbanyai	True4u Rangsit Stadium	Rangsit, Thailand	Decision	5	3:00
2017-09-22	Win	(Thailand) Numthai Phetnongki	True4u Rangsit Stadium	Rangsit, Thailand	TKO (Referee Stoppage)	4	
2017-08-25	Win	(Thailand) Yodsiam FighterMuaythai	True4u Rangsit Stadium	Rangsit, Thailand	Decision	5	3:00
2017-07-06	Loss	(Thailand) Khemphet Poomphanmuang	Rajadamnern Stadium	Bangkok, Thailand	KO	3	
2017-05-29	Loss	(Thailand) Dodoh Lookkhokrak	Rajadamnern Stadium	Bangkok, Thailand	KO	3	
2017-04-14	Win	(Thailand) Yodsiam FighterMuaythai	True4u Rangsit Stadium	Pathum Thani, Thailand	KO	2	
2017-02-03	Win	(Thailand) Jaroenphon Popthirathum	True4u Rangsit Stadium	Pathum Thani, Thailand	KO (Left Elbow)	4	
2017-01-06	Loss	(Thailand) Saenson Erawan	True4u Rangsit Stadium	Pathum Thani, Thailand	Decision	5	3:00
2016-11-25	Loss	(Thailand) Praewprao PetchyindeeAcademy	True4u Rangsit Stadium	Pathum Thani, Thailand	KO	2	
For the True4U Mini Flyweight title.
2016-10-05	Win	(Thailand) Rit Sor.Visetkit	Rajadamnern Stadium	Bangkok, Thailand	Decision	5	3:00
2016-08-29	Loss	(Thailand) Thongrob Lukbanyai	Rajadamnern Stadium	Bangkok, Thailand	KO	4	
2016-08-01	Win	(Thailand) Rit Sor.Visetkit	Rajadamnern Stadium	Bangkok, Thailand	KO	4	
2016-05-18	Win	(Thailand) Robert Fightermuaythai	Rajadamnern Stadium	Bangkok, Thailand	KO	4	
2016-04-25	Win	(Thailand) Pepsi Or.Prasert	Rajadamnern Stadium	Bangkok, Thailand	Decision	5	3:00
2016-03-07	Win	(Thailand) Prabphairi PookongyadsubDomsuk	Rajadamnern Stadium	Bangkok, Thailand	KO	2	
2016-02-17	Win	(Thailand) Phetsakol Sitballsakol99	Rajadamnern Stadium	Bangkok, Thailand	KO	3	
2016-01-09	Loss	(Thailand) Sangfah Nor.Anuwatgym	Lumpinee Stadium	Bangkok, Thailand	Decision	5	3:00
2015-11-30	Loss	(Thailand) Sangfah Nor.Anuwatgym	Rajadamnern Stadium	Bangkok, Thailand	Decision	5	3:00
2015-10-27	Win	(Thailand) Sangsakda Teemuangloei	Lumpinee Stadium	Bangkok, Thailand	Decision	5	3:00
2015-08-03	Win	(Thailand) Paingern Singnawa-Awute	Rajadamnern Stadium	Bangkok, Thailand	Decision	5	3:00
2015-07-03	Win	(Thailand) Paingern Singnawa-Awute	Lumpinee Stadium	Bangkok, Thailand	Decision	5	3:00
Legend: Win Loss Draw/No contest Notes

Amateur Muay Thai Record
Date	Result	Opponent	Event	Location	Method	Round	Time
2021-12-10	Loss	(United States) Jalil Barnes	2021 IFMA World Championships U-23, Semi Finals	Bangkok, Thailand	Decision (29:28)	3	3:00
Wins the 2021 IFMA World Championships U-23 -63.5kg Bronze Medal.
2021-12-09	Win	(Hungary) Márk Rehák	2021 IFMA World Championships U-23, Quarter Finals	Bangkok, Thailand	TKO	2	
2021-12-08	Win	(United Kingdom) David Sinclair	2021 IFMA World Championships U-23, Round 2	Bangkok, Thailand	TKO	2	
Legend: Win Loss Draw/No contest Notes

== See also ==
- List of male kickboxers
