= Petchdam Petchyindee Academy =

Thai Muay Thai fighter (born 1998)

- Born: Waiwit Wongkhan; May 25, 1998 (age 28); Ubon Ratchathani, Thailand
- Other names: Petdam Gaiyanghadao; Black Diamond; The Baby Shark
- Height: 171 cm (5 ft 7 1/2 in)
- Weight: 62.5 kg (138 lb; 9.84 st)
- Reach: 71.2 in (181 cm)
- Style: Muay Thai, Kickboxing
- Stance: Southpaw
- Fighting out of: Bangkok, Thailand
- Team: Petchyindee Academy

Kickboxing record
- Total: 142
- Wins: 108
- Losses: 26
- Draws: 8

Other information
- Boxing record from BoxRec

Petchdam Petchyindee Academy (Thai: เพชรดำ เพชรยินดีอะคาเดมี; born May 25, 1998), is a professional Muay Thai fighter and kickboxer from Thailand. Petchdam is the current WMO Super Lightweight World Champion and a former ONE Flyweight Kickboxing World Champion. He is also a former Lumpinee Stadium bantamweight champion, Thailand bantamweight champion, Toyota Marathon featherweight champion, and WBC Muaythai world featherweight champion.

== Career ==
=== ONE Championship ===
Petchdam Petchyindee Academy made his ONE Super Series debut on July 18, 2018 at ONE Championship: Pursuit of Power, where he knocked out Australian Josh Tonna in the 2nd round. His next appearance on ONE Championship was in his home country of Thailand at ONE Championship: Kingdom of Heroes on October 6, 2018, where he scored a 1st-round knockout over Kenny Tse. Petchdam would continue his run of dominance in ONE Super Series in 2019 when he faced Masahide Kudo at ONE Championship: Call to Greatness on February 22. He knocked out Kudo in 35 seconds of the 2nd round.

In what would be his biggest test in ONE Championship, Petchdam Petchyindee Academy faced Algerian Elias Mahmoudi for the inaugural ONE Flyweight Kickboxing World Championship at ONE Championship: Warriors of Light. Despite a slow start to the fight, having to fight under kickboxing rules, Petchdam would slowly find his rhythm. An accidental low kick from Petchdam in the fourth round would render Mahmoudi unable to continue. Petchdam would win the title via technical decision.

In his first title defense at ONE Championship: Dreams of Gold on August 16, 2019, Petchdam Petchyindee Academy would face Dutch-Moroccan kickboxer Ilias Ennahachi. Being overwhelmed by Ennahachi's punching combinations, Petchdam was knocked down in the second round. In the third round, a left hook from Ennahachi sent him down for a second time and Petchdam ultimately lost the fight and the title via 3rd-round knockout. This would also mark his first loss in ONE Championship.

In his first fight since losing the ONE Kickboxing Flyweight World Title, Petchdam will face Kohei "Momotaro" Kodera at ONE Championship: Fire & Fury on January 31, 2020. After a slow start in the first round, he would defeat Momotaro by majority decision.

On July 31, 2020, Petchdam faced Rodtang Jitmuangnon in a trilogy fight for the ONE Flyweight Muay Thai World Championship at ONE Championship: No Surrender. Despite Rodtang injuring his hand early in the fight, Petchdam was unable to overcome his opponent's pressure and lost the fight by majority decision.

Petchdam faced Taiki Naito at ONE Championship: Revolution on September 24, 2021. He lost the close bout via split decision.

Due to a disagreement between his gym, Petchyindee Academy, and ONE Championship, all Petchyindee fighters were released from the promotion at the request of the gym.

== Titles and accomplishments ==
- Lumpinee Stadium
  - 2015 Lumpinee Bantamweight 118 lbs Champion
- Professional Boxing Association of Thailand (PAT)
  - 2015 Thailand Bantamweight 118 lbs Champion
- Toyota Marathon
  - 2017 Toyota Marathon 126 lbs Champion
- WBC Muaythai
  - 2018 WBC Muaythai World Featherweight (126 lbs) Champion
- ONE Championship
  - 2019 ONE Flyweight Kickboxing World Champion
- True4U Petchyindee
  - 2020 True4U Lightweight Champion
- World Muaythai Organization
  - 2025 WMO World Super Lightweight (140 lbs) Champion

Awards

- 2022 Rajadamnern Stadium Fight of the Year (vs. Chorfah Tor.Sangtiennoi)

== Fight record ==
Muay Thai record
109 Wins, 26 Losses, 9 Draws
Date	Result	Opponent	Event	Location	Method	Round	Time
2026-11-22		(Japan) Muga Seto	JKA KICK Insist 29	Tokyo, Japan			
Defending the WMO World Super Lightweight (140 lbs) title.
2026-09-19	Loss	(Thailand) Nongbiw Jitmuangnon	Rajadamnern World Series	Bangkok, Thailand	Decision (Unanimous)	3	3:00
2026-08-15	Win	(Thailand) Mardsing Khaolakmuaythai	Muay Thai to the World x Rebellion	Melbourne, Australia	Decision (Split)	3	3:00
2026-05-02	Loss	(Thailand) Petchchonlatharn Kor.Adisak	Rajadamnern World Series	Bangkok, Thailand	Decision (Unanimous)	3	3:00
2026-03-07	Win	(Lebanon) Rawad Saab	Rajadamnern World Series	Bangkok, Thailand	TKO (3 Knockdowns)	1	2:38
2025-11-23	Win	(Japan) Muga Seto	JKA KICK Insist 25	Tokyo, Japan	Decision (Unanimous)	5	3:00
Wins the vacant WMO World Super Lightweight (140 lbs) title.
2025-09-26	Win	(Iran) Mehrzad Mehdipour	Road to Rajadamnern	Bangkok, Thailand	KO (Left hook)	1	2:31
2025-07-25	Win	(Morocco) Zouhair Abou Elfdal	Rajadamnern Knockout	Bangkok, Thailand	Decision (Unanimous)	3	3:00
2025-06-14	Win	(Argentina) Tomás Aguirre	Rajadamnern World Series	Bangkok, Thailand	Decision (Split)	3	3:00
2024-12-21	Loss	(China) Ji Zhize	Wu Lin Feng 551 - 63 kg Qualifier Tournament, Semifinals	Tangshan, China	Decision (Unanimous)	3	3:00
2024-09-29	Loss	(Japan) Yuki Yoza	K-1 World MAX 2024	Tokyo, Japan	KO (Low kicks)	3	1:12
2024-08-28	Win	(Brazil) Veto FamilyMuaythai	Petchyindee x Phetchbuncha	Phuket, Thailand	KO (Low kick)	2	1:05
2024-01-27	Loss	(China) Zhang Lanpei	Wu Lin Feng 2024: 12th Global Kung Fu Festival	Tangshan, China	Decision (Unanimous)	3	3:00
2023-08-26	Loss	(Thailand) Samingdet Nor.Anuwatgym	Rajadamnern World Series - Final 4	Bangkok, Thailand	Decision (Unanimous)	3	3:00
2023-07-22	Win	(Thailand) Buakhiao Por-Paoin	Rajadamnern World Series - Group Stage	Bangkok, Thailand	Decision (Unanimous)	3	3:00
2023-05-13	Win	(Thailand) Thongnoi Lukbanyai	Rajadamnern World Series - Group Stage	Bangkok, Thailand	Decision (Unanimous)	3	3:00
2023-03-11	Win	(Thailand) Kompatak SinbiMuayThai	RWS + Petchyindee, Rajadamnern Stadium	Bangkok, Thailand	Decision (Split)	3	3:00
2023-01-28	Loss	(Thailand) Chalam Parunchai	Suek Muay Mahakuson Samakom Chao Paktai	Bangkok, Thailand	Decision	5	3:00
2022-12-28	Win	(Thailand) Flukenoi Kiatfahlikit	Muay Thai Rakya Soosakon + SAT Super Fight Withee Tin Thai + Petchyindee	Bangkok, Thailand	Decision (Unanimous)	5	3:00
2022-10-29	Draw	(Thailand) Duangsompong Jitmuangnon	9Muaydee VitheeThai, Or.Tor.Gor.3 Stadium	Nonthaburi province, Thailand	Decision	5	3:00
2022-08-25	Draw	(Thailand) Chorfah Tor.Sangtiennoi	Petchyindee, Rajadamnern Stadium	Bangkok, Thailand	Decision	5	3:00
2022-07-15	Win	(Thailand) Kimluay SorJor.TongPrachin	Muaymanwansuk, Rangsit Stadium	Rangsit, Thailand	Decision	5	3:00
2022-05-05	Win	(Thailand) Kanongsuek Gor.Kampanat	Petchyindee, Rajadamnern Stadium	Bangkok, Thailand	TKO	3	1:10
2022-02-17	Loss	(Thailand) Flukenoi Kiatfahlikit	Petchyindee, Rajadamnern Stadium	Bangkok, Thailand	Decision	5	3:00
Loses the True4U Lightweight Title.
2021-11-26	Win	(Thailand) Nuathoranee Samchaivisetsuk	Muay Thai Moradok Kon Thai + Rajadamnern Super Fight	Buriram, Thailand	Decision	5	3:00
2021-09-24	Loss	(Japan) Taiki Naito	ONE Championship: Revolution	Kallang, Singapore	Decision (Split)	3	3:00
2021-04-08	Loss	(Thailand) Duangsompong Jitmuangnon	SuekMahakamMuayRuamPonKon Chana + Petchyindee	Songkhla Province, Thailand	Decision	5	3:00
2021-03-05	Win	(Thailand) Ploywittiya Petsimuen	Muaymanwansuk, Rangsit Stadium	Rangsit, Thailand	Decision	5	3:00
2020-10-16	Win	(Thailand) Chatpayak Chor.Hapayak	Muaymanwansuk, Rangsit Stadium	Rangsit, Thailand	TKO	5	
Wins the True4U Lightweight Title.
2020-07-31	Loss	(Thailand) Rodtang Jitmuangnon	ONE Championship: No Surrender	Bangkok, Thailand	Decision (Majority)	5	3:00
For the ONE Flyweight Muay Thai World Championship.
2020-01-31	Win	(Japan) Kohei "Momotaro" Kodera	ONE Championship: Fire & Fury	Pasay, Philippines	Decision (Majority)	3	3:00
2019-12-22	Win	(Italy) Michael Garraffo	Rajadamnern Stadium	Bangkok, Thailand	KO	2	
2019-08-16	Loss	(Netherlands) Ilias Ennahachi	ONE Championship: Dreams of Gold	Bangkok, Thailand	KO (Left hook)	3	1:00
Lost the ONE Flyweight Kickboxing World Championship.
2019-05-10	Win	(Algeria) Elias Mahmoudi	ONE Championship: Warriors Of Light	Bangkok, Thailand	Technical Decision	5	0:29
Won the inaugural ONE Flyweight Kickboxing World Championship. Accidental kick to the groin rendered Mahmoudi unable to continue.
2019-02-22	Win	(Japan) Masahide Kudo	ONE Championship: Call to Greatness	Kallang, Singapore	KO (Left Cross)	2	0:35
2018-12-26	Loss	(Thailand) Detsakda Sitsongpeenong	Rajadamnern Stadium	Bangkok, Thailand	Decision	5	3:00
2018-11-22	Loss	(Thailand) Rungkit Wor.Sanprapai	Rajadamnern Stadium	Bangkok, Thailand	Decision	5	3:00
2018-10-06	Win	(Australia) Kenny Tse	ONE Championship: Kingdom of Heroes	Bangkok, Thailand	KO (High Kick)	1	1:26
2018-08-09	Draw	(Thailand) Mongkolchai Kwaitonggym	Rajadamnern Stadium	Bangkok, Thailand	Decision	5	3:00
2018-07-13	Win	(Australia) Josh Tonna	ONE Championship: Pursuit of Power	Kuala Lumpur, Malaysia	KO (High Kick)	2	1:11
2018-06-07	Loss	(Thailand) Rungkit Wor.Sanprapai	Rajadamnern Stadium	Bangkok, Thailand	Decision	5	3:00
2018-05-09	Win	(Thailand) Rungkit Wor.Sanprapai	Rajadamnern Stadium	Bangkok, Thailand	Decision	5	3:00
Wins WBC Muaythai World 126lbs title
2018-03-17	Win	(Norway) Markus Kalberg	Topking World Series	Thailand	Decision	3	3:00
2018-02-08	Loss	(Thailand) Rodtang Jitmuangnon	Rajadamnern Stadium	Bangkok, Thailand	Decision	5	3:00
2018-01-18	Loss	(Thailand) Chanasuek Kor.Kampanat	Rajadamnern Stadium	Bangkok, Thailand	Decision	5	3:00
2017-11-24	Win	(Thailand) VIP FighterMuayTha	Toyota Marathon Tournament	Bangkok, Thailand	Decision	5	3:00
Wins 126lbs Toyota Marathon Tournament title
2017-11-24	Win	(Thailand) Petchsongkom Sitjaroensub	Toyota Marathon Tournament	Bangkok, Thailand	Decision	5	3:00
2017-11-01	Loss	(Thailand) Suakim PK Saenchaimuaythaigym	Rajadamnern Stadium	Bangkok, Thailand	Decision	5	3:00
2017-09-04	Win	(Thailand) Klasuek Phetjinda	Rajadamnern Stadium	Bangkok, Thailand	Decision	5	3:00
2017-05-31	Win	(Thailand) Petchtaksin Sor Sommai	Rajadamnern Stadium	Bangkok, Thailand	Decision	5	3:00
2017-05-04	Win	(Thailand) Rodtang Jitmuangnon	Rajadamnern Stadium	Bangkok, Thailand	Decision	5	3:00
2017-03-02	Loss	(Thailand) Phetwason Ansukumvit	Rajadamnern Stadium	Bangkok, Thailand	Decision	5	3:00
2017-02-20	Win	(Thailand) Kundiew Payapkumpan	Rangsit Boxing Stadium	Rangsit, Thailand	Decision	5	3:00
2017-02-02	Loss	(Thailand) Suakim PK Saenchaimuaythaigym	Rajadamnern Stadium	Bangkok, Thailand	Decision	5	3:00
2016-12-09	Win	(Thailand) Sing Parunchai	Lumpinee Stadium	Bangkok, Thailand	KO	4	
2016-11-14	Win	(Thailand) Sing Parunchai	Rajadamnern Stadium	Bangkok, Thailand	Decision	5	3:00
2016-09-29	Loss	(Thailand) Phetnamngam Or Kwanmuang	Rajadamnern Stadium	Bangkok, Thailand	Decision	5	3:00
2016-09-04	Win	(Thailand) Manasak Pinsinchai	Rajadamnern Stadium	Bangkok, Thailand	Decision	5	3:00
2016-07-14	Win	(Thailand) Petsila Chor.Sampinong	Rajadamnern Stadium	Bangkok, Thailand	Decision	5	3:00
2016-05-28	Loss	(Thailand) Kwanphet Sor.Suwanpakdee	Rangsit Stadium	Bangkok, Thailand	Decision	5	3:00
2016-04-30	Win	(Thailand) Tomas Sor.Chaijarern	Rangsit Stadium	Rangsit, Thailand	Decision	5	3:00
2016-03-26	Loss	(Thailand) Phetsila Chor.Sampinong	Rangsit Stadium	Rangsit, Thailand	Decision	5	3:00
2016-01-06	Win	(Thailand) Saksit Tor.Paopiumsub	Rajadamnern Stadium	Bangkok, Thailand	Decision	5	3:00
2015-12-08	Win	(Thailand) Khunhan Sitthongsak	Lumpinee Stadium	Bangkok, Thailand	TKO	5	
Wins Thailand and Lumpinee 118 lbs titles.
2015-11-06	Win	(Thailand) Morakot Komsaimai	Lumpinee Stadium	Bangkok, Thailand	TKO		
2015-10-15	Win	(Thailand) Revo Bangkok-Alaiyont	Rajadamnern Stadium	Thailand	KO	1	
2015-09-08	Win	(Thailand) Yodasawin SinbiMuayThai	Lumpinee Stadium	Thailand	Decision	5	3:00
2015-08-11	Loss	(Thailand) Morakot Petchsimuen	Lumpinee Stadium	Thailand	KO	4	
2015-07-08	Win	(Thailand) Kongpop Thor.Pran49	Rajadamnern Stadium	Thailand	KO	4	
2015-05-23	Win	(Thailand) Weraphonlek Wor.Wanchai	Siam Omnoi Boxing Stadium	Thailand	Decision	5	3:00
2015-03-29	Win	(Thailand) Denputhai Kiatmoo9	Rajadamnern Stadium	Bangkok, Thailand	TKO	4	
2014-12-14	Win	(Thailand) Denputhai Kiatmoo9	Rangsit Stadium	Rangsit, Thailand	Decision	5	3:00
2014-09-17	Win	(Thailand) Nampon Phuket Top Team	Rajadamnern Stadium	Bangkok, Thailand	Decision	5	3:00
Legend: Win Loss Draw/No contest Notes
