= Sing Parunchai =

Thai Muay Thai fighter

Sing
- Born: 1995 (age 30–31); Thailand
- Nationality: Thai
- Height: 164 cm (5 ft 5 in)
- Weight: 55.0 kg (121.3 lb; 8.66 st)
- Style: Muay Thai
- Fighting out of: Thung Song, Thailand

Other information
- Occupation: Policeman
- Notable relatives: Saen Parunchai (brother)

Sing Parunchai (สิงห์ พรัญชัย) is a retired Thai Muay Thai fighter.

== Biography ==
Sing became notable on the Muay Thai scene in 2014 when he won the 112 lbs Channel 7 Stadium belt. Next year Sing's winning streak at Channel 7 reached the symbolic number of 7 which saw him granted the coveted Channel 7 jacket. He was also awarded the title of Fighter of the Year.

Sing retired from competition in 2019 and is serving as a police officer.

== Titles and accomplishments ==
- Professional Boxing Association of Thailand (PAT)
  - 2017 Thailand Featherweight Champion (1 defense)
- Channel 7 Stadium
  - 2014 Channel 7 Stadium 112 lbs Champion
  - 2015 Channel 7 Stadium Fighter of the Year

== Fight record ==
Muay Thai record
Date	Result	Opponent	Event	Location	Method	Round	Time
2019-07-09	Loss	(Thailand) Kongthoranee Sor.Sommai	Lumpinee Stadium	Bangkok, Thailand	KO (Left high kick)	2	
2019-05-29	Loss	(Thailand) Klasuk Phetjinda	Rajadamnern Stadium	Bangkok, Thailand	TKO (Doctor Stoppage)	3	
2019-03-31	Loss	(Thailand) Dechsakda Phukongyadsuebudomsuk	Channel 7 Stadium	Bangkok, Thailand	KO (Elbows)	3	
2018-12-07	Loss	(Thailand) Messi Pangkongprap	Lumpinee Stadium 62nd Birthday	Bangkok, Thailand	KO (3 Knockdowns/Elbow)	2	
Lost Thailand Featherweight title.
2018-10-28	Win	(Thailand) Wayunoi SuperMuay	Channel 7 Stadium	Bangkok, Thailand	KO	1	
2018-09-07	Win	(Thailand) Samsing Por.Peenapat	Lumpinee Stadium	Bangkok, Thailand	Decision	5	3:00
Defends Thailand Featherweight title.
2018-03-28	Loss	(Thailand) Mongkolchai Kwaitonggym	WanParunchai + Poonseua Sanjorn	Nakhon Si Thammarat, Thailand	Decision	5	3:00
2018-02-10	Win	(United States) Christian Hyatt	Topking World Series 17	Guang'an, China	KO (Knee)	3	
2017-12-19	Win	(Thailand) Sprinter Pangkongprap	Lumpinee Stadium	Bangkok, Thailand	Decision	5	3:00
Wins vacant Thailand Featherweight title.
2017-11-04	Win	(Thailand) Sakunchailek VeronaFarm	Lumpinee Stadium	Bangkok, Thailand	KO	1	
2017-09-10	Loss	(Thailand) Sakunchailek VeronaFarm	Samui Fight 2017 + Kiatpetch	Ko Samui, Thailand	Decision	5	3:00
2017-08-08	Loss	(Thailand) Sprinter Pangkongprap	Lumpinee Stadium	Bangkok, Thailand	Decision	5	3:00
2017-05-05	Win	(Thailand) Khunsuknoi Sitkaewprapol	Lumpinee Stadium	Bangkok, Thailand	TKO (Knees)	4	
2016-12-09	Loss	(Thailand) Petchdam Petchyindee Academy	Lumpinee Stadium	Bangkok, Thailand	KO (Left elbow)	4	
2016-11-14	Loss	(Thailand) Petchdam Petchyindee Academy	Rajadamnern Stadium	Bangkok, Thailand	Decision	5	3:00
2016-09-30	Win	(Thailand) Prajanchai P.K.Saenchaimuaythaigym	Lumpinee Stadium	Bangkok, Thailand	Decision	5	3:00
2016-08-30	Win	(Thailand) Yodmongkol Muangseema	Lumpinee Stadium	Bangkok, Thailand	Decision	5	3:00
2016-07-21	Loss	(Thailand) Prajanchai P.K.Saenchaimuaythaigym	Rajadamnern Stadium	Bangkok, Thailand	Decision	5	3:00
2016-05-10	Win	(Thailand) Methee Sor.Jor.ToiPaedriew	Lumpinee Stadium	Bangkok, Thailand	Decision	5	3:00
2016-03-28	Win	(Thailand) Petch Sawansrangmunja		Nakhon Si Thammarat, Thailand	Decision	5	3:00
2016-03-04	Win	(Thailand) Sprinter Pangkongprap	Lumpinee Stadium	Bangkok, Thailand	Decision	5	3:00
2016-01-23	Win	(Thailand) Kaokarat Jitmuangonon		Bangkok, Thailand	KO	4	
2015-09-11	Win	(Thailand) Sprinter Pangkongprap	Lumpinee Stadium	Bangkok, Thailand	Decision	5	3:00
2015-08-09	Win	(Thailand) Kaokarat Jitmuangnon	Channel 7 Stadium	Bangkok, Thailand	KO	3	
2015-07-12	Win	(Thailand) Superjeng Por.Phinabhat	Channel 7 Stadium	Bangkok, Thailand	KO (Punches)	3	
2015-05-31	Win	(Thailand) Fahmai Sor.Sommai	Channel 7 Stadium	Bangkok, Thailand	KO (Punches)	3	
2015-04-12	Win	(Thailand) Chokprecha Sitnayoktaweep	Channel 7 Stadium	Bangkok, Thailand	KO (Right high kick)	3	
2015-02-03	Win	(Thailand) Kaokarat Jitmuangnon	Lumpinee Stadium	Bangkok, Thailand	Decision	5	3:00
2014-12-28	Win	(Thailand) Phetprayakrai PK.SaenchaiMuayThaiGym	Channel 7 Stadium	Bangkok, Thailand	Decision	5	3:00
2014-11-02	Win	(Thailand) Chamuakphet Jitmuangnon	Channel 7 Stadium	Bangkok, Thailand	Decision	5	3:00
2014-07-20	Win	(Thailand) Kumason Lukhaonanai	Channel 7 Stadium	Bangkok, Thailand	KO	2	
Wins Channel 7 Stadium 112 lbs title.
2014-04-06	Win	(Thailand) Keng Jitmuangnon	Channel 7 Stadium	Bangkok, Thailand	Decision	5	3:00
Legend: Win Loss Draw/No contest Notes
