= Superlek Kiatmuu9 =

Thai Muay Thai fighter and kickboxer

- Born: Manachai Yamsiri; 6 November 1995 (age 31); Prakhon Chai, Buriram, Thailand
- Native name: มนัสชัย เอี่ยมศิริ
- Other names: Superlek Mor.Rattanabundit; Superlek Santisurin (ซุปเปอร์เล็ก สันติสุรินทร์)
- Nickname: The Kicking Machine (เครื่องเตะมนุษย์); Paib; The Elbow Machine
- Height: 171 cm (5 ft 7 in)
- Division: Super Flyweight; Bantamweight; Super Bantamweight; Featherweight; Super Featherweight; Lightweight; Super Lightweight
- Reach: 180 cm (71 in)
- Style: Muay Thai (Muay Tae); Kickboxing
- Stance: Orthodox
- Fighting out of: Bangkok, Thailand
- Team: Kiatmuu9 Gym; Yokkao Fight Team; Superlek Muay Thaï Gym
- Years active: c. 1996–present

Kickboxing record
- Total: 175
- Wins: 139
- Losses: 32
- Draws: 4

Other information
- Notable relatives: Singdam Kiatmuu9 (uncle); Petpanomrung Kiatmuu9 (cousin); Panomroonglek Kratingdaenggym (cousin); Sam-A Gaiyanghadao (brother-in-law)

Manachai Yamsiri (Thai: มนัสชัย เอี่ยมศิริ; born 6 November 1995), known professionally as Superlek Kiatmuu9 (Thai: ซุปเปอร์เล็ก เกียรติหมู่9), is a Thai professional Muay Thai fighter and kickboxer. Nicknamed 'The Kicking Machine', he is regarded as one of the greatest Muay Thai fighters of his generation.

In 2011, he won the Thailand Mini-Flyweight (105 lbs) title. The following year, he won the vacant Thailand Flyweight (112 lbs) title and the vacant Lumpinee Stadium Super Flyweight (115 lbs) title. In 2013, he won the Lumpinee Stadium Bantamweight (118 lbs) title and the Thailand Featherweight (126 lbs) title. In 2016, he won the WBC MuayThai Super Featherweight World title. In 2022, he won the vacant True4U Super Lightweight (140 lbs) title and made his ONE Championship debut. In 2023, he won the vacant ONE Flyweight (135 lbs) Kickboxing World title when he beat Spanish fighter Daniel Puertas Gallardo. In 2024, he won the ONE Bantamweight (145 lbs) Muay Thai World title when he beat Jonathan Haggerty of Britain by knockout in the first round.

A technical Muay Fimeu stylist, Yamsiri is known for his striking skills which is characterised by fast kicks and knees. In 2012, he was awarded Sports Authority of Thailand Muay Thai Fighter of the Year. As of October 2024, he is #1 in Combat Press' men's pound-for-pound rankings for Muay Thai and #6 in Beyond Kick's men's pound-for-pound rankings for kickboxing.

== Muay Thai career ==
=== ONE Championship ===
On 16 February 2019, Superlek made his ONE Championship debut against Lao Chetra at ONE Championship: Clash of Legends. By unanimous decision, Superlek Kiatmoo9 defeated Lao Chetra .

Superlek returned to ONE Championship on 10 May 2019 at ONE Championship: Warriors of Light. Facing Rui Botelho, Superlek won the fight by unanimous decision.

On 31 July 2020, Superlek faced Panpayak Jitmuangnon at ONE Championship: No Surrender for a seventh time. He won the fight by a unanimous decision to improve to 2–4–1 against Panpayak all-time.

Superlek was scheduled to fight Fahdi Khaled during ONE Championship: A New Breed 2 on 21 August 2020. He defeated Khaled by a unanimous decision.

Superlek is scheduled to challenge Ilias Ennahachi for the ONE Flyweight Kickboxing World Championship at ONE Championship: Fists Of Fury on 26 February 2021. He lost by a controversial unanimous decision.

Due to the highly controversial nature of the decision, ONE CEO Chatri Sityodtong announced an immediate title rematch between Superlek and Ennahachi.

Superlek was booked to face Tagir Khalilov at ONE: Lights Out on 11 March 2022. However, the bout was scrapped.

==== ONE Muay Thai Flyweight Grand Prix ====
Superlek was scheduled to face former Shoot boxing and RISE champion Taiki Naito in the ONE Muay Thai Flyweight Grand Prix quarterfinal at ONE 157 on 20 May 2022. He won by unanimous decision.

Superlek faced Walter Goncalves in the quarterfinals of the ONE Muay Thai Flyweight Grand Prix at ONE on Prime Video 1 on 27 August 2022. He won after knocking out Goncalves with an elbow in the first round.

Superlek was scheduled to face Panpayak Jitmuangnon in the ONE Flyweight Muay Thai World Grand Prix Tournament final bout on 22 October 2022, at ONE on Prime Video 3. However, Superlek withdrawn from the event due to training injuries. The pair was rescheduled to meet at ONE 164 on 3 December 2022. At weigh-ins, the pair failed to make weight in the flyweight division and disqualified from the tournament, agreed to compete in the 138 lbs catchweight. He won the fight by split decision.

==== ONE Flyweight Kickboxing World Champion ====
The rematch between Superlek and Ilias Ennahachi was scheduled on 14 January 2022, at ONE on Prime Video 6. However, Ennahachi pulled out due to his inability to make the flyweight limit of 135 pounds while hydrated, and he vacated the title. Therefore, Superlek instead faced Daniel Puertas for the vacant championship. He won the fight via unanimous decision, which earned him the title.

Superlek was scheduled to make his first ONE Flyweight Kickboxing World Championship against the ONE Flyweight Muay Thai World champion Rodtang Jitmuangnon at ONE Fight Night 8 on 25 March 2023. However, Rodtang withdraw from the bout due to injury and was replaced by Danial Williams. He won the bout via knockout in the third round.

Superlek faced the two-division WBC Muaythai champion Nabil Anane at ONE Friday Fights 22 on 23 June 2023. He won the bout in the first round, defeating Anane via body punch KO.

Superlek faced Tagir Khalilov in the main event of ONE Fight Night 12 on 15 July 2023. At the weigh-ins, Superlek missed weight, weighing in at 135.25 lbs, 0.25 pounds over the limit. The bout proceeded at catchweight with Superlek being fined a portion of his purse, which went to Tagir Khalilov. He won the fight by second-round technical knockout.

On 22 September 2023, Superlek won a decision over ONE Flyweight Muay Thai World champion Rodtang Jitmuangnon, which had been a scheduled title defense for Rodtang, but Superlek again missed weight so Rodtang's title was not on the line

Superlek was scheduled to defend the ONE Flyweight Kickboxing World Championship against Elias Mahmoudi at ONE Fight Night 18 on 13 January 2024. However, Mahmoudi withdrew from the bout due to rib injury. Superlek was instead to face Takeru Segawa, who was originally set to face Rodtang Jitmuangnon, at ONE 165 on 28 January 2024. He won the fight by unanimous decision.

==== ONE Bantamweight Muay Thai World Champion ====
Superlek challenged Jonathan Haggerty for the ONE Bantamweight Muay Thai World Championship at ONE 168 on 6 September 2024. He knocked Haggerty out with an elbow just 49 seconds into the fight, becoming the new champion. Superlek was awarded Performance of the Night honors for this victory.

In the first title defense a bantamweight title, Superlek was scheduled to face Nico Carrillo on 24 January 2025, at ONE 170. However, Superlek withdrew from the bout and was replaced by Nabil Anane for the interim championship.

The rematch between Superlek and Anane in a unification of ONE Bantamweight Muay Thai World Championship took place at ONE 172 on 23 March 2025. At the weigh-ins, Superlek failed the hydration test and came in at 146.25 pounds, 1.25 pounds over the bantamweight limit. As a results, Superlek was stripped of the title and the bout was switched to three-round non-title bout. He lost the fight via unanimous decision.

Superlek faced Yuki Yoza at ONE 173 on November 16, 2025.

== Personal life ==
Yamsiri is the nephew of Singdam Kiatmuu9, a former four-time Lumpinee Stadium champion, and also grew up with the current Glory Featherweight Champion, Petpanomrung Kiatmuu9.

== Titles and accomplishments ==
- ONE Championship
  - 2023 ONE Flyweight (135 lbs) Kickboxing World Champion (Current; 2 defenses)
  - 2024 ONE Bantamweight (145 lbs) Muay Thai World Champion (Current)
  - Performance of the Night (Five times) vs. Danial Williams, Walter Goncalves, Nabil Anane, Takeru Segawa and Jonathan Haggerty
  - Longest current win streak in ONE Championship (9)
  - 2024: Fighter of the Year (Tied with Kade Ruotolo)
  - 2024: Fight of the Year vs. Takeru Segawa
  - 2024: Knockout of the Year vs. Jonathan Haggerty
- Petchyindee True4U
  - 2022 True4U Light Welterweight (140 lbs) Champion
- Muay Thai Nai Khanom Tom Association
  - 2018 Nai Khanom Tom Champion
- World Boxing Council Muaythai
  - 2016 WBC Super Featherweight (130lbs) World Champion
- Professional Boxing Association of Thailand (PAT)
  - 2013 Thailand Featherweight (126 lbs) Champion
  - 2012 Thailand Flyweight (112 lbs) Champion
  - 2011 Thailand Mini Flyweight (105 lbs) Champion
- Lumpinee Stadium
  - 2013 Lumpinee Stadium Bantamweight (118 lbs) Champion
  - 2012 Lumpinee Stadium Super Flyweight (115 lbs) Champion(1 defense)
- Awards
  - 2012 Sports Authority of Thailand Muay Thai Fighter of the Year
  - 2024 Combat Press Fighter of the Year

== Fight record ==
Muay Thai Record
139 Wins, 32 Losses, 4 Draws
Date	Result	Opponent	Event	Location	Method	Round	Time
2026-08-07	Loss	(Russia) Abdulla Dayakaev	ONE: The Inner Circle 25	Bangkok, Thailand	TKO (knee injury)	2	0:39
2026-05-15	Loss	(Russia) Abdulla Dayakaev	ONE Friday Fights 154, Lumpinee Stadium	Bangkok, Thailand	Decision (split)	3	5:00
2025-11-16	Loss	(Japan) Yuki Yoza	ONE 173	Tokyo, Japan	Decision (Unanimous)	3	3:00
2025-03-23	Loss	(Thailand) Nabil Anane	ONE 172	Saitama, Japan	Decision (Unanimous)	3	3:00
Superlek missed weight (146.25 lb) and was stripped of the ONE Bantamweight Muay Thai World Championship. The bout became a three-round non-title fight.
2024-09-06	Win	(United Kingdom) Jonathan Haggerty	ONE 168	Denver, United States	KO (Elbow)	1	0:49
Wins the ONE Bantamweight Muay Thai World Championship.
2024-06-28	Win	(Thailand) Kongthoranee Sor.Sommai	ONE Friday Fights 68, Lumpinee Stadium	Bangkok, Thailand	Decision (Unanimous)	3	3:00
2024-01-28	Win	(Japan) Takeru	ONE 165	Tokyo, Japan	Decision (Unanimous)	5	3:00
Defends the ONE Flyweight Kickboxing World Championship.
2023-09-22	Win	(Thailand) Rodtang Jitmuangnon	ONE Friday Fights 34	Bangkok, Thailand	Decision (Unanimous)	3	3:00
2023-07-15	Win	(Russia) Tagir Khalilov	ONE Fight Night 12	Bangkok, Thailand	TKO (Referee stoppage)	2	1:42
2023-06-23	Win	(Thailand) Nabil Anane	ONE Friday Fights 22	Bangkok, Thailand	KO (Straight to the body)	1	2:03
2023-03-25	Win	(Australia) Danial Williams	ONE Fight Night 8	Kallang, Singapore	KO (Punches)	3	1:55
Defends the ONE Flyweight (135 lbs) Kickboxing World title.
2023-01-14	Win	(Spain) Daniel Puertas Gallardo	ONE Fight Night 6	Bangkok, Thailand	Decision (Unanimous)	5	3:00
Wins the vacant ONE Flyweight (135 lbs) Kickboxing World title.
2022-12-03	Win	(Thailand) Panpayak Jitmuangnon	ONE 164	Manila, Philippines	Decision (Split)	3	3:00
2022-08-27	Win	(Brazil) Walter Goncalves	ONE on Prime Video 1	Kallang, Singapore	KO (Elbow)	1	1:35
ONE Flyweight (135 lbs) Muay Thai World Grand Prix Tournament Semi-Final.
2022-05-20	Win	(Japan) Taiki Naito	ONE 157	Kallang, Singapore	Decision (Unanimous)	3	3:00
ONE Flyweight (135 lbs) Muay Thai World Grand Prix Tournament Quarter-Final.
2022-04-07	Win	(Thailand) Superball Tded99	Petchyindee, Rajadamnern Stadium	Bangkok, Thailand	Decision (Unanimous)	5	3:00
Wins the vacant True4U Super Lightweight (140 lbs) title.
2021-04-08	Win	(Thailand) Rungkit Wor.Sanprapai	Mahakam MuayRuamPonKon Chana + Petchyindee	Songkhla Province, Thailand	Decision	5	3:00
2021-02-26	Loss	(Morocco) Ilias Ennahachi	ONE Championship: Fists Of Fury	Kallang, Singapore	Decision (Unanimous)	5	3:00
For the ONE Flyweight (135 lbs) Kickboxing World title.
2020-09-11	Win	(Tunisia) Fahdi Khaled	ONE Championship: A New Breed 2	Bangkok, Thailand	Decision (Unanimous)	3	3:00
2020-07-31	Win	(Thailand) Panpayak Jitmuangnon	ONE Championship: No Surrender	Bangkok, Thailand	Decision (Unanimous)	3	3:00
2019-12-23	Win	(Thailand) Superball Tded99	Rajadamnern Stadium 74th Anniversary	Bangkok, Thailand	Decision (Unanimous)	5	3:00
2019-11-07	Win	(Thailand) Suakim PK Saenchaimuaythaigym	Ruamponkon Prachin	Prachinburi, Thailand	Decision	5	3:00
2019-10-05	Draw	(Thailand) Kaonar P.K.SaenchaiMuaythaiGym	Yod Muay Thai Naikhanomton	Buriram, Thailand	Decision	5	3:00
2019-09-05	Win	(Thailand) Rungkit Wor.Sanprapai	Rajadamnern Stadium	Bangkok, Thailand	Decision	5	3:00
2019-08-08	Win	(Thailand) Rangkhao Wor.Sangprapai	Rajadamnern Stadium	Bangkok, Thailand	Decision	5	3:00
2019-07-11	Loss	(Thailand) Rangkhao Wor.Sangprapai	Rajadamnern Stadium	Bangkok, Thailand	Decision	5	3:00
For the vacant Rajadamnern Stadium Super Featherweight (130 lbs) title.
2019-05-10	Win	(Portugal) Rui Botelho	ONE Championship: Warriors Of Light	Bangkok, Thailand	Decision (Unanimous)	3	3:00
2019-04-04	Win	(Thailand) Rungkit Morbeskamala	Rajadamnern Stadium	Bangkok, Thailand	Decision	5	3:00
2019-02-16	Win	(Cambodia) Lao Chetra	ONE Championship: Clash of Legends	Thailand	Decision (Unanimous)	3	3:00
2018-12-26	Loss	(Thailand) Kaonar P.K.SaenchaiMuaythaiGym	Rajadamnern Stadium	Bangkok, Thailand	Decision	5	3:00
2018-10-29	Win	(Spain) Cristian Opazos	Yokkao 33 & 34	Hong Kong	KO (Right Elbow)	1	1:42
2018-10-13	Win	(United Kingdom) Jonathan Haggerty	Yokkao 31 & 32	United Kingdom	TKO (Doctor Stoppage/Cut)	2	3:00
2018-10-05	Win	(Thailand) Muangthai PKSaenchaimuaythaigym	Muaythai Expo	Buriram, Thailand	Decision	5	3:00
2018-08-17	Loss	(Thailand) Panpayak Jitmuangnon	Rajadamnern Stadium	Bangkok, Thailand	Decision	5	3:00
2018-06-14	Draw	(Thailand) Phet Utong Or. Kwanmuang	Rajadamnern Stadium	Bangkok, Thailand	Decision	5	3:00
2018-01-25	Win	(Thailand) Phet Utong Or. Kwanmuang	Rajadamnern Stadium	Bangkok, Thailand	Decision	5	3:00
2017-12-30	Loss	(Thailand) Panpayak Jitmuangnon	Phetchbuncha Stadium	Ko Samui, Thailand	Decision	5	3:00
2017-12-08	Draw	(Thailand) Muangthai PKSaenchaimuaythaigym	Lumpinee Stadium	Bangkok, Thailand	Decision	5	3:00
2017-10-15	Win	(Scotland) Christopher Shaw	Yokkao 27	England	Decision (Unanimous)	5	3:00
2017-09-08	Win	(Thailand) Muangthai PKSaenchaimuaythaigym	Lumpinee Stadium	Bangkok, Thailand	Decision	5	3:00
2017-08-06	Win	(Japan) Sho Ogawa	Suk Wanchai MuayThai Super Fight	Nagoya, Japan	TKO (Doctor Stoppage/Elbow)	3	2:05
2017-06-05	Win	(Thailand) Kaimukkao Por.Thairongruangkamai	Rajadamnern Stadium	Bangkok, Thailand	KO (Right Upper Elbow)	2	
2017-05-04	Loss	(Thailand) Panpayak Jitmuangnon	Rajadamnern Stadium	Bangkok, Thailand	Decision	5	3:00
2017-04-06	Win	(Thailand) Sangmanee Sor Tienpo	Rajadamnern Stadium	Bangkok, Thailand	Decision	5	3:00
2017-02-02	Win	(Thailand) Panpayak Jitmuangnon	Rajadamnern Stadium	Bangkok, Thailand	Decision	5	3:00
2016-12-22	Loss	(Thailand) Phet Utong Or. Kwanmuang	Rajadamnern Stadium	Bangkok, Thailand	Decision	5	3:00
2016-11-14	Win	(Thailand) Saeksan Or. Kwanmuang	Rajadamnern Stadium	Bangkok, Thailand	Decision	5	3:00
2016-10-09	Win	(Japan) Yasuyuki	Suk Wanchai	Japan	KO (Right High Kick)	2	2:15
2016-09-23	Win	(Thailand) Saeksan Or. Kwanmuang	Lumpinee Stadium	Bangkok, Thailand	Decision	5	3:00
Wins the WBC MuayThai Super Featherweight World title.
2016-07-27	Win	(Thailand) Petngam Kiatkamphon	Rajadamnern Stadium	Bangkok, Thailand	Decision	5	3:00
2016-06-20	Win	(Thailand) Kaewkangwan Priewwayo	Rajadamnern Stadium	Bangkok, Thailand	Decision	5	3:00
2016-05-09	Win	(Thailand) Bangpleenoi 96Penang	Rajadamnern Stadium	Bangkok, Thailand	KO (Right Up Elbow)	2	1:15
2016-04-07	Win	(Thailand) Superball Tded99	Rajadamnern Stadium	Bangkok, Thailand	TKO (Right Low Kicks)	3	1:40
2016-03-07	Loss	(Thailand) Kaewkangwan Priewwayo	Rajadamnern Stadium	Bangkok, Thailand	Decision	5	3:00
2015-12-08	Loss	(Thailand) Kaewkangwan Priewwayo	Rajadamnern Stadium	Bangkok, Thailand	Decision	5	3:00
For the Lumpinee Stadium and Thailand Super Featherweight (130 lbs) title.
2015-11-09	Win	(Thailand) Bangpleenoi 96Penang	Rajadamnern Stadium	Bangkok, Thailand	Decision	5	3:00
2015-10-07	Loss	(Thailand) Panpayak Jitmuangnon	Rajadamnern Stadium	Bangkok, Thailand	Decision	5	3:00
2015-09-09	Draw	(Thailand) Panpayak Jitmuangnon	Rajadamnern Stadium	Bangkok, Thailand	Decision	5	3:00
2015-08-11	Loss	(Thailand) Kaonar P.K.SaenchaiMuaythaiGym	Lumpinee Stadium	Bangkok, Thailand	Decision	5	3:00
2015-07-15	Loss	(Thailand) Phet Utong Or. Kwanmuang	Rajadamnern Stadium	Bangkok, Thailand	Decision	5	3:00
2015-05-08	Loss	(Thailand) Saen Parunchai	Lumpinee Stadium	Bangkok, Thailand	Decision	5	3:00
2015-04-08	Win	(Thailand) Bangpleenoi 96Penang	Rajadamnern Stadium	Bangkok, Thailand	Decision	5	3:00
2015-01-26	Win	(Thailand) Sangthongnoi Tanasuranakhon	Rajadamnern Stadium	Bangkok, Thailand	Decision	5	3:00
2014-12-24	Win	(Thailand) Jompichit Sitchefboontam	Rajadamnern Stadium	Bangkok, Thailand	Decision	5	3:00
2014-10-28	Loss	(Thailand) Phet Utong Or. Kwanmuang	Lumpinee Stadium	Bangkok, Thailand	TKO (Doctor Stoppage/Cut)	4	1:49
2014-10-09	Win	(Thailand) Kaimukkao Por.Thairongruangkamai	Rajadamnern Stadium	Bangkok, Thailand	KO (Right High Kick)	3	2:49
2014-09-10	Win	(Thailand) Pornsanae Sitmonchai	Rajadamnern Stadium	Bangkok, Thailand	KO (Right High Kick)	1	2:38
2014-08-14	Win	(Thailand) Thanonchai Thanakorngym	Rajadamnern Stadium	Bangkok, Thailand	Decision	5	3:00
2014-07-15	Loss	(Thailand) Thaksinlek Kiatniwat	Lumpinee Stadium	Bangkok, Thailand	Decision	5	3:00
2014-06-11	Win	(Thailand) Palangtip Nor Sripueng	Rajadamnern Stadium	Bangkok, Thailand	TKO (Doctor Stoppage/Broken Jaw)	3	3:00
2014-05-06	Loss	(Thailand) Superbank Sakchaichode	Lumpinee Stadium	Bangkok, Thailand	Decision	5	3:00
For the Lumpinee Stadium Featherweight (126 lbs) title.
2014-03-30	Win	(Thailand) Superbank Sakchaichode	Songkla	Southern Thailand	Decision	5	3:00
2014-02-28	Loss	(Thailand) Sangmanee Sor Tienpo	Lumpinee King Fighter 4 Man Tournament Semi Finals, Lumpinee Stadium	Bangkok, Thailand	Decision	3	3:00
2014-01-14	Win	(Thailand) Rungpet Gaiyanghadao	Omnoi Stadium	Bangkok, Thailand	Decision	5	3:00
2013-12-03	Win	(Thailand) Thanonchai Thanakorngym	Lumpinee Stadium	Bangkok, Thailand	Decision	5	3:00
Wins the Thailand Featherweight (126 lbs) title.
2013-11-04	Win	(Thailand) Tong Puideenaidee	Rajadamnern Stadium	Bangkok, Thailand	Decision	5	3:00
2013-10-11	Loss	(Thailand) Rungpet Gaiyanghadao	Lumpinee Stadium	Bangkok, Thailand	Decision	5	3:00
2013-09-04	Loss	(Thailand) Sam-A Kaiyanghadaogym	Rajadamnern Stadium	Bangkok, Thailand	Decision	5	3:00
2013-07-12	Loss	(Thailand) Sam-A Kaiyanghadaogym	Lumpinee Stadium	Bangkok, Thailand	Decision	5	3:00
For the Thailand Super Bantamweight (122 lbs) title.
2013-06-07	Win	(Thailand) Mondam Sor.Weerapon	Lumpinee Stadium	Bangkok, Thailand	KO (Right Elbow)	3	1:22
Wins the Lumpinee Stadium Bantamweight (118 lbs) title.
2013-05-17	Win	(Thailand) Fonluang Sitboonmee	Lumpinee Stadium	Bangkok, Thailand	Decision	5	3:00
2013-04-16	Win	(Thailand) Rungpet Gaiyanghadao	Lumpinee Stadium	Bangkok, Thailand	KO (Right Up Elbow)	3	1:37
2013-03-08	Loss	(Thailand) Choknamchai Sitjakung	Lumpinee Stadium	Bangkok, Thailand	Decision	5	3:00
For the Thailand Bantamweight (118 lbs) title.
2013-02-15	Loss	(Thailand) Mondam Sor.Weerapon	Lumpinee Stadium	Bangkok, Thailand	Decision	5	3:00
2013-01-04	Loss	(Thailand) Wanchalong Sitsornong	Lumpinee Stadium	Bangkok, Thailand	Decision	5	3:00
2012-12-07	Win	(Thailand) Sangmanee Sor Tienpo	Lumpinee Stadium	Bangkok, Thailand	Decision	5	3:00
Defends the Lumpinee Stadium Super Flyweight (115 lbs) title.
2012-11-02	Win	(Thailand) Mondam Sor.Weerapon	Lumpinee Stadium	Bangkok, Thailand	Decision	5	3:00
2012-10-09	Win	(Thailand) Muangthai PKSaenchaimuaythaigym	Lumpinee Stadium	Bangkok, Thailand	Decision	5	3:00
2012-09-07	Win	(Thailand) Muangthai PKSaenchaimuaythaigym	Lumpinee Stadium	Bangkok, Thailand	Decision	5	3:00
Wins the vacant Lumpinee Stadium Super Flyweight (115 lbs) title.
2012-08-17	Win	(Thailand) Hongtonglek Chorfahpiansi	Lumpinee Stadium	Bangkok, Thailand	Decision	5	3:00
2012-07-12	Loss	(Thailand) Mondam Sor.Weerapon	Wanmeechai, Rajadamnern Stadium	Bangkok, Thailand	Decision	5	3:00
2012-06-08	Win	(Thailand) Palangpon WatcharachaiGym	Lumpinee Stadium	Bangkok, Thailand	Decision	5	3:00
Wins the vacant Thailand Flyweight (112 lbs) title.
2012-05-04	Loss	(Thailand) Choknumchai Sitjakong	Lumpinee Stadium	Bangkok, Thailand	Decision	5	3:00
2012-03-27	Win	(Thailand) Palangpon WatcharachaiGym	Lumpinee Stadium	Bangkok, Thailand	Decision	5	3:00
2012-03-02	Win	(Thailand) Wanchai Rambo-Esarn	Lumpinee Stadium	Bangkok, Thailand	Decision	5	3:00
2012-02-03	Loss	(Thailand) Wanchai Rambo-Esarn	Lumpinee Stadium	Bangkok, Thailand	Decision	5	3:00
2012-01-03	Win	(Thailand) Sarawuth Pithakpabhadiang	Lumpinee Stadium	Bangkok, Thailand	Decision	5	3:00
2011-11-25	Win	(Thailand) Petsakon F.A.Group	Petchyindee, Lumpinee Stadium	Bangkok, Thailand	Decision	5	3:00
Wins the Thailand Mini-Flyweight (105 lbs) title.
2011-10-18	Win	(Thailand) Design Rajanont	Lumpinee Stadium	Bangkok, Thailand	Decision	5	3:00
2011-04-26	Loss	(Thailand) ET Phetsomnuak	Petchpiya, Lumpinee Stadium	Bangkok, Thailand	Decision	5	3:00
2010-12-29	Loss	(Thailand) Rittewada Sitthikul	Lumpinee Stadium	Bangkok, Thailand	Decision	5	3:00
2010-11-26	Win	(Thailand) Chokmongkol Sitnoi	Petchyindee, Lumpinee Stadium	Bangkok, Thailand	Decision	5	3:00
2010-01-15	Loss	(Thailand) Sangmanee Sor Tienpo	Phetsuphan, Lumpinee Stadium	Bangkok, Thailand	Decision	5	3:00
2009-09-01	Loss	(Thailand) Bangpleenoi 96Penang	Petchyindee, Lumpinee Stadium	Bangkok, Thailand	KO		
Legend: Win Loss Draw/No contest Notes

== See also ==
- List of male kickboxers
- List of multi-sport athletes
- List of multi-sport champions
