= Panpayak Jitmuangnon =

Thai professional Muay Thai fighter

- Born: Taewan Seangngen; January 7, 1996 (age 30); Samut Prakarn, Thailand
- Native name: เทวัญ แสงเงิน
- Other names: Panpayak Payabkumphan
- Nickname: The Three-Time Fighter of the Year (ยอดมวย 3 พ.ศ.); The Angel Warrior (???)
- Height: 174 cm (5 ft 9 in)
- Division: Mini Flyweight; Light Flyweight; Flyweight; Super Flyweight; Bantamweight; Super Bantamweight; Featherweight; Super Featherweight; Lightweight
- Reach: 175 cm (69 in)
- Style: Muay Thai (Muay Femur)
- Stance: Southpaw
- Fighting out of: Bangkok, Thailand
- Team: Jitmuangnon Gym; Phuket Fight Club
- Years active: c. 2009–present

Kickboxing record
- Total: 297
- Wins: 251
- By knockout: 35
- Losses: 43
- Draws: 3

Other information
- Occupation: Muay Thai fighter
- Notable relatives: Kiewpayak Jitmuangnon (younger brother)

Taewan Seangngen (Thai: เทวัญ แสงเงิน; born January 7, 1996), known professionally as Panpayak Jitmuangnon (Thai: พันธุ์พยัคฆ์ จิตรเมืองนนท์), is a Thai professional Muay Thai fighter currently signed to One Championship. He is a former four-time Lumpinee Stadium champion and two-time Rajadamnern Stadium champion across four divisions. He also was the 2013, 2014, and 2015 Sports Writers Association of Thailand Fighter of the Year, the only Muay Thai fighter ever to win the award three times in a row.

== Muay Thai career ==
The Sportswriters Association of Thailand voted him their 2013 "Fighter of the Year". Panpayak was undefeated in 2013.

In May 2014, Panpayak fought Ponakrit Sorjor Wichitpidriew at the Lumpini Stadium. He won the fight by a unanimous decision.

Panpayak was scheduled to fight Wanchalong PK.Saenchai in June 2014 at the Lumpini Stadium. He won the fight by a fifth round TKO.

He won the Lumpini Stadium Bantamweight title in August 2018, through a decision win over Suakim Sit Sor Thor Taew.

Panpayak was scheduled to fight Prajanchai P.K.Saenchaimuaythaigym for the Lumpini Stadium Bantamweight title. He had three months previously lost the title to Prajanchai. Panpayak regained the title by a unanimous decision.

Panpayak made his ONE Championship debut in September 2019, when he was scheduled to fight Masahide Kudo. He won the fight by a unanimous decision.

He fought Superlek Kiatmuu9, for the seventh time, during ONE Championship: No Surrender. Superlek won the fight by a unanimous decision.

Panpayak faced Savvas Michael in the quarterfinals of the ONE Muay Thai Flyweight Grand Prix at ONE on Prime Video 1 on August 27, 2022. He won after knocking out Michael with a head kick in the second round.

Panpayak was scheduled to face Superlek Kiatmuu9 in the ONE Flyweight Muay Thai World Grand Prix Tournament final bout on October 22, 2022, at ONE on Prime Video 3. However, Superlek withdrawn from the event due to training injuries. The pair was rescheduled to meet at ONE 164 on December 3, 2022. At weigh-ins, the pair failed to make weight in the flyweight division and disqualified from the tournament, agreed to compete in the 138 lbs catchweight. He lost the fight by split decision.

== Titles and accomplishments ==
=== Titles ===
- Lumpinee Stadium
  - 2015 2x Lumpinee Stadium Featherweight (126 lbs) Champion
  - 2014 2x Lumpinee Stadium Bantamweight (118 lbs) Champion
- Rajadamnern Stadium
  - 2013 Rajadamnern Stadium Light Flyweight (108 lbs) Champion
  - 2012 Rajadamnern Stadium Mini Flyweight (105 lbs) Champion (1 defense)

=== Awards ===
- ONE Championship
  - Performance of the Night (One time) vs. Savvas Michael
  - 2022 Muay Thai Knockout of the Year vs. Savvas Michael at ONE on Prime Video 1
- Sports Writers Association of Thailand
  - 2015 Sports Writers Association of Thailand Fighter of the Year
  - 2014 Sports Writers Association of Thailand Fighter of the Year
  - 2013 Sports Writers Association of Thailand Fighter of the Year

== Fight record ==
Muay Thai and Kickboxing Record
251 Wins, 44 Losses, 3 Draws
Date	Result	Opponent	Event	Location	Method	Round	Time
2026-12-04		(Thailand) Lamnamoonlek Or.Atchariya	ONE The Inner Circle 41, Lumpinee Stadium	Bangkok, Thailand			
2026-09-25	Loss	(Thailand) Lamnamoonlek Or.Atchariya	ONE The Inner Circle 32, Lumpinee Stadium	Bangkok, Thailand	Decision (Split)	3	3:00
2026-07-24	Win	(Mexico) Anuar Cisneros	ONE The Inner Circle 23, Lumpinee Stadium	Bangkok, Thailand	Decision (Unanimous)	3	3:00
2026-05-22	Win	(Morocco) Othman Rhouni	ONE Friday Fights 155, Lumpinee Stadium	Bangkok, Thailand	Decision (Split)	3	3:00
2025-08-29	Loss	(Russia) Asadula Imangazaliev	ONE Friday Fights 122, Lumpinee Stadium	Bangkok, Thailand	KO (High kick)	1	2:07
2025-03-14	Win	(Iran) Majid Seydali	ONE Friday Fights 100, Lumpinee Stadium	Bangkok, Thailand	TKO (Referee stoppage)	3	2:16
2024-12-20	Loss	(Russia) Egor Bikrev	ONE Friday Fights 92, Lumpinee Stadium	Bangkok, Thailand	KO (Punch)	2	1:08
2024-10-18	Win	(Romania) Silviu Vitez	ONE Friday Fights 83, Lumpinee Stadium	Bangkok, Thailand	Decision (Unanimous)	3	3:00
2022-12-03	Loss	(Thailand) Superlek Kiatmuu9	ONE 164: Pacio vs. Brooks	Manila, Philippines	Decision (Split)	3	3:00
2022-08-27	Win	(Cyprus) Savvas Michael	ONE on Prime Video 1	Kallang, Singapore	KO (Head kick)	2	0:10
ONE Muay Thai Flyweight Grand Prix Semi-Final.
2021-10-29	Win	(Spain) Daniel Puertas	ONE Championship: NextGen III	Kallang, Singapore	Decision (Unanimous)	3	3:00
2021-04-08	Win	(Thailand) Chamuaktong Fightermuaythai	Mahakam Muay RuamPonKon Chana + Petchyindee	Songkhla Province, Thailand	Decision	5	3:00
2020-07-31	Loss	(Thailand) Superlek Kiatmuu9	ONE Championship: No Surrender	Bangkok, Thailand	Decision (Unanimous)	3	3:00
2019-11-28	Win	(Thailand) Panpayak Sitchefboontham	Rajadamnern Stadium	Bangkok, Thailand	Decision	5	3:00
2019-09-06	Win	(Japan) Masahide Kudo	ONE Championship: Immortal Triumph	Ho Chi Minh City, Vietnam	Decision (Unanimous)	3	3:00
2019-08-16	Win	(Thailand) Kaonar P.K.SaenchaiMuaythaiGym	Supit + Sor. Sommai Birthday	Songkla, Thailand	Decision	5	3:00
2019-07-18	Win	(Thailand) Yamin P.K.Saenchaimuaythaigym	Rajadamnern Stadium	Bangkok, Thailand	Decision	5	3:00
2019-01-31	Loss	(Thailand) Muangthai PKSaenchaimuaythaigym	Rajadamnern Stadium	Bangkok, Thailand	KO (Left elbow)	3	
2018-12-07	Win	(Portugal) Rui Botelho	ONE Championship: Destiny of Champions	Kuala Lumpur, Malaysia	Decision (Unanimous)	3	3:00
2018-10-27	Win	(Iran) Ehsan Khorshidvand	Thai Fight	Thailand	Decision (Unanimous)	3	3:00
2018-08-16	Win	(Thailand) Superlek Kiatmuu9	Rajadamnern Stadium	Bangkok, Thailand	Decision	5	3:00
2018-07-07	Win	(Brazil) Davisson Paixao	Thai Fight	Thailand	Decision (Unanimous)	3	3:00
2018-05-12	Loss	(Brazil) Henrique Muller	Thai Fight Samui	Thailand	KO (Left Hook)	1	1:05
2018-02-20	Loss	(Thailand) Yodlekpet Or. Pitisak	Onesongchai, Lumpinee Stadium	Bangkok, Thailand	Decision	5	3:00
2017-12-30	Win	(Thailand) Superlek Kiatmuu9	Petch Buncha, 13th Anniversary	Ko Samui, Thailand	Decision	5	3:00
2017-11-06	Draw	(Thailand) Sangmanee Sor Tienpo	Rajadamnern Stadium	Bangkok, Thailand	Decision	5	3:00
2017-09-09	Win	(Thailand) Sangmanee Sor Tienpo	Samui Fight	Koh Samet, Thailand	Decision	5	3:00
2017-05-31	Win	(Thailand) Saeksan Or. Kwanmuang	Sor. Sommai, Rajadamnern Stadium	Bangkok, Thailand	Decision	5	3:00
2017-05-04	Win	(Thailand) Superlek Kiatmuu9	Petchyindee, Rajadamnern Stadium	Bangkok, Thailand	Decision	5	3:00
2017-04-06	Win	(Thailand) Phet Utong Or. Kwanmuang	Jitmuangnon, Rajadamnern Stadium	Bangkok, Thailand	Decision	5	3:00
2017-03-02	Loss	(Thailand) Phet Utong Or. Kwanmuang	Rajadamnern Stadium	Bangkok, Thailand	KO (Right hook)	1	
2017-02-02	Loss	(Thailand) Superlek Kiatmuu9	Petchyindee, Rajadamnern Stadium	Bangkok, Thailand	Decision	5	3:00
2016-12-09	Win	(Thailand) Rodlek Jaotalaytong	Lumpinee Stadium	Bangkok, Thailand	Decision	5	3:00
2016-11-15	Win	(Thailand) Kaonar P.K.SaenchaiMuaythaiGym	Rajadamnern Stadium	Bangkok, Thailand	Decision	5	3:00
2016-09-14	Win	(Thailand) Superbank Mor Ratanabandit	Rajadamnern Stadium	Bangkok, Thailand	Decision	5	3:00
2016-07-08	Win	(Thailand) Chalam Parunchai	Lumpinee Stadium	Bangkok, Thailand	TKO (High kick)	2	
2016-06-09	Win	(Thailand) Kaonar P.K.SaenchaiMuaythaiGym	Onesongchai, Rajadamnern Stadium	Bangkok, Thailand	Decision	5	3:00
2016-05-02	Loss	(Thailand) Sangmanee Sor Tienpo	Jitmuangnon, Rajadamnern Stadium	Bangkok, Thailand	Decision	5	3:00
2016-03-04	Win	(Thailand) Kaonar P.K.SaenchaiMuaythaiGym	Kriekkrai, Lumpinee Stadium	Bangkok, Thailand	Decision	5	3:00
2016-01-28	Loss	(Thailand) Saen Parunchai	Petwithaya, Rajadamnern Stadium	Bangkok, Thailand	Decision	5	3:00
2015-12-22	Win	(Thailand) Kaonar P.K.SaenchaiMuaythaiGym	Kiatphet, Lumpinee Stadium	Bangkok, Thailand	Decision	5	3:00
Wins the vacant Lumpinee Stadium Featherweight (126 lbs) title.
2015-10-07	Win	(Thailand) Superlek Kiatmuu9	Rajadamnern Stadium	Bangkok, Thailand	Decision	5	3:00
2015-09-09	Draw	(Thailand) Superlek Kiatmuu9	Rajadamnern Stadium	Bangkok, Thailand	Decision	5	3:00
2015-07-02	Win	(Thailand) Parkalek Tor.Laksong	Rajadamnern Stadium	Bangkok, Thailand	Decision	5	3:00
2015-06-05	Loss	(Thailand) Saen Parunchai	Lumpinee Stadium	Bangkok, Thailand	Decision	5	3:00
Lost the Lumpinee Stadium Featherweight (126 lbs) title.
2015-04-29	Win	(Thailand) Sam-A Kaiyanghadaogym	Rajadamnern Stadium	Bangkok, Thailand	KO(Left high kick)	1	1:20
2015-03-06	Win	(Thailand) Sam-A Kaiyanghadaogym	Lumpinee Stadium	Bangkok, Thailand	Decision	5	3:00
Won the vacant Lumpinee Stadium Featherweight (126 lbs) title.
2015-01-08	Win	(Thailand) Luknimit Singklongsi	Rajadamnern Stadium	Bangkok, Thailand	Decision	5	3:00
2014-12-09	Win	(Thailand) Prajanchai P.K.Saenchaimuaythaigym	Lumpinee Stadium	Bangkok, Thailand	Decision	5	3:00
Won the Lumpinee Stadium Bantamweight (118 lbs) title.
2014-10-31	Win	(Thailand) Suakim Sit Sor Thor Taew	Lumpinee Stadium	Bangkok, Thailand	Decision	5	3:00
2014-10-06	Win	(Thailand) Denchingkwan Lamtongkampet	Rajadamnern Stadium	Bangkok, Thailand	KO (head kick)	4	
2014-09-05	Loss	(Thailand) Prajanchai P.K.Saenchaimuaythaigym	Lumpinee Stadium	Bangkok, Thailand	Decision	5	3:00
Lost the Lumpinee Stadium Bantamweight (118 lbs) title.
2014-08-08	Win	(Thailand) Suakim Sit Sor Thor Taew	Lumpinee Stadium	Bangkok, Thailand	Decision	5	3:00
Won the Lumpinee Stadium Bantamweight (118 lbs) title.
2014-07-17	Win	(Thailand) Phet Or.Pimonsri	Rajadamnern Stadium	Bangkok, Thailand	Decision	5	3:00
2014-06-06	Win	(Thailand) Wanchalong PK.Saenchai	Lumpinee Stadium	Bangkok, Thailand	TKO (elbow/ref stoppage)	5	3:00
2014-05-02	Win	(Thailand) Ponakrit Sorjor Wichitpidriew	Lumpinee Stadium	Bangkok, Thailand	Decision	5	3:00
2014-04-08	Loss	(Thailand) Wanchalong PK.Saenchai	Lumpinee Stadium	Bangkok, Thailand	Decision	5	3:00
For the Lumpinee Stadium Flyweight (112 lbs) title.
2014-01-10	Win	(Thailand) Chankrit Ekbangsai	Lumpinee Stadium	Bangkok, Thailand	Decision	5	3:00
2013-11-04	Win	(Thailand) Ekmongkol Kaiyanghadaogym	Rajadamnern Stadium	Bangkok, Thailand	Decision	5	3:00
2013-10-03	Win	(Thailand) Jomhod Eminentair	Rajadamnern Stadium	Bangkok, Thailand	Decision	5	3:00
2013-09-11	Win	(Thailand) Trakunpet Sor Sommai	Rajadamnern Stadium	Bangkok, Thailand	KO (head kick)	1	
2013-08-05	Win	(Thailand) Ruengsak Sitniwat	Rajadamnern Stadium	Bangkok, Thailand	Decision	5	3:00
2013-06-04	Win	(Thailand) Sarawut Pitakpaapardaeng	Lumpinee Stadium	Bangkok, Thailand	Decision	5	3:00
2013-05-02	Win	(Thailand) Ruengsak Sitniwat	Rajadamnern Stadium	Bangkok, Thailand	Decision	5	3:00
Won the Rajadamnern Stadium Light Flyweight (108 lbs) title.
2013-04-05	Win	(Thailand) Yothin Sakaethongresort	Lumpinee Stadium	Bangkok, Thailand	KO	2	
2013-02-21	Draw	(Thailand) Senkeng Nuicoffeeboran	Rajadamnern Stadium	Bangkok, Thailand	Decision	5	3:00
2013-01-23	Loss	(Thailand) Yuthasak Sakburiram		Buriram, Thailand	Decision	5	3:00
2013-01-17	Win	(Thailand) Yodmanoot Petpotong	Rajadamnern Stadium	Bangkok, Thailand	Decision	5	3:00
Defends the Rajadamnern Stadium Mini Flyweight (105 lbs) title.
2012-11-28	Win	(Thailand) Nikomlek Tor.Tawat	Rajadamnern Stadium	Bangkok, Thailand	Decision	5	3:00
2012-10-11	Loss	(Thailand) Phet Or.Pimonsri	Rajadamnern Stadium	Bangkok, Thailand	Decision	5	3:00
2012-09-20	Win	(Thailand) Detkart Por Pongsawang	Rajadamnern Stadium	Bangkok, Thailand	Decision	5	3:00
Won the Rajadamnern Stadium Mini Flyweight (105 lbs) title.
2012-06-28	Win	(Thailand) Dokmaidang JSP	Rajadamnern Stadium	Bangkok, Thailand	Decision	5	3:00
2012-04-19	Win	(Thailand) Petlamsin Kiatphontip	Rajadamnern Stadium	Bangkok, Thailand	Decision	5	3:00
2012-03-15	Win	(Thailand) Dungriang Sitkriangkrai	Rajadamnern Stadium	Bangkok, Thailand	Decision	5	3:00
2012-02-13	Win	(Thailand) Petdam Petnopakao	Rajadamnern Stadium	Bangkok, Thailand	Decision	5	3:00
2012-01-18	Win	(Thailand) Dej Sor.Ploenjit	Rajadamnern Stadium	Bangkok, Thailand	Decision	5	3:00
2011-12-08	Win	(Thailand) Raktemroi Visootjaroenyon	Rajadamnern Stadium	Bangkok, Thailand	KO	5	
2011-11-14	Win	(Thailand) Ongri Barnpeeumruangpeetong	Rajadamnern Stadium	Bangkok, Thailand	Decision	5	3:00
2011-10-20	Win	(Thailand) Pudpadnoi Sujibamikiew	Onesongchai, Rajadamnern Stadium	Bangkok, Thailand	Decision	5	3:00
2011-08-18	Loss	(Thailand) Dej Sor.Ploenjit	Rajadamnern Stadium	Bangkok, Thailand	Decision	5	3:00
2011-06-27	Win	(Thailand) Puenkon Tor.Surat	Rajadamnern Stadium	Bangkok, Thailand	Decision	5	3:00
2011-04-25	Win	(Thailand) Ongri Barnpeeumruangpeetong	Rajadamnern Stadium	Bangkok, Thailand	Decision	5	3:00
2011-02-21	Win	(Thailand) Puenkon Tor.Surat	Rajadamnern Stadium	Bangkok, Thailand	Decision	5	3:00
Legend: Win Loss Draw/No contest Notes

== See also ==
- List of male kickboxers
