= Saen Parunchai =

Thai professional Muay Thai fighter

- Born: December 27, 1991 (age 34); Nakhon Si Thammarat, Thailand
- Other names: Kangkenlek SBP Car Network (กางเขนเหล็ก เอส.บี.พี.คาร์เนตเวิร์ค); Kangkenlek Sor.Tawarung (กางเขนเหล็ก ส.ตะวันรุ่ง)
- Height: 175 cm (5 ft 9 in)
- Division: Featherweight; Super Featherweight
- Style: Muay Thai (Muay Khao)
- Stance: Orthodox

Other information
- Notable relatives: Sing Parunchai (brother)

Saen Parunchai (Thai: แสน พรัญชัย) is a Thai former professional Muay Thai fighter. He is a former Lumpinee Stadium Featherweight Champion.

== Titles and accomplishments ==
- Lumpinee Stadium
  - 2015 Lumpinee Stadium Featherweight (126 lbs) Champion

== Fight record ==
Muay Thai Record (incomplete)
Date	Result	Opponent	Event	Location	Method	Round	Time
2018-09-27	Loss	(Thailand) Sibsaen Tor.Iewjaroentongpuket		Bangkok, Thailand	Decision	5	3:00
2018-09-01	Loss	(Thailand) Sibsaen Tor.Iewjaroentongpuket	Lumpinee Stadium	Bangkok, Thailand	Decision	5	3:00
2016-12-09	Loss	(Thailand) Mongkolpetch Petchyindee	Lumpinee Stadium	Bangkok, Thailand	Decision	5	3:00
2016-06-24	Win	(Thailand) Nuenglanlek Jitmuangnon	Central Stadium	Songkhla, Thailand	Decision	5	3:00
2016-04-29	Loss	(Thailand) Phet Utong Or. Kwanmuang	Lumpinee Stadium	Bangkok, Thailand	KO (Right Uppercut)	3	
2016-03-28	Loss	(Thailand) Muangthai PKSaenchaimuaythaigym	Southern Thailand	Thailand	KO (Left Upper Elbow)	4	0:13
2016-03-04	Loss	(Thailand) Muangthai PKSaenchaimuaythaigym	Kriekkrai Fights, Lumpinee Stadium	Bangkok, Thailand	Decision	5	3:00
2016-01-28	Win	(Thailand) Panpayak Jitmuangnon	Petwithaya Fights, Rajadamnern Stadium	Bangkok, Thailand	Decision	5	3:00
2015-11-10	Loss	(Thailand) Kaonar P.K.SaenchaiMuaythaiGym	Lumpinee Stadium	Bangkok, Thailand	Decision	5	3:00
2015-09-11	Win	(Thailand) Songkom Nayoksanya	Lumpinee Stadium	Bangkok, Thailand	Decision	5	3:00
2015-07-02	Loss	(Thailand) Sangmanee Sor Tienpo	Tor.Chaiwat Fight, Rajadamnern Stadium	Bangkok, Thailand	Decision	5	3:00
2015-06-05	Win	(Thailand) Panpayak Jitmuangnon	Lumpinee Stadium	Bangkok, Thailand	Decision	5	3:00
Wins the Lumpinee Stadium Featherweight (126 lbs) title.
2015-05-08	Win	(Thailand) Superlek Kiatmuu9	Lumpinee Stadium	Bangkok, Thailand	Decision	5	3:00
2015-04-05	Draw	(Thailand) GrandPrixnoi Phetkiatphet	Channel 7 Stadium	Bangkok, Thailand	Decision	5	3:00
2015-01-04	Loss	(Thailand) Nawapon Lookpachrist	Channel 7 Stadium	Bangkok, Thailand	KO	2	
2014-11-04	Win	(Thailand) Daotrang Sakniranrat	Lumpinee Stadium	Bangkok, Thailand	KO	3	
2014-09-30	Loss	(Thailand) Yodtongthai Sor.Sommai	Lumpinee Stadium	Bangkok, Thailand	Decision	5	3:00
For a 2 million baht side-bet.
2014-08-05	Win	(Thailand) Monkao Chor Janmanee	Lumpinee Stadium	Bangkok, Thailand	Decision	5	3:00
2014-01-04	Loss	(France) Rafi Bohic	Patong Boxing Stadium Sainamyen	Phuket, Thailand	KO (Left hook to the body)	2	
2013-06-28	Draw	(Thailand) Monkao Chor Janmanee		Thailand	Decision	5	3:00
2013-01-08	Win	(Thailand) Kwankhao Mor.Ratanabandit	Lumpinee Stadium	Bangkok, Thailand	Decision	5	3:00
2012-11-20	Win	(Thailand) Poonsawan Lookprabaht	Lumpinee Stadium	Bangkok, Thailand	Decision	5	3:00
2012-10-23	Win	(Thailand) Chalongsuk Kiatcharunchai	Lumpinee Stadium	Bangkok, Thailand	TKO (Knees)	4	
2012-08-10	Win	(Thailand) Monkaw Chor.Chonmanee	Lumpinee Stadium	Bangkok, Thailand	Decision	5	3:00
2012-06-10	Win	(Thailand) Rungphet Wor.Rungniran	Channel 7 Stadium	Bangkok, Thailand	Decision	5	3:00
2011-12-07	Win	(Thailand) Krangpreenoi Pitakpaphadaeng		Trang province, Thailand	KO	5	
2011-10-24	Win	(Thailand) Denchiangkwan Laemthongkanpad	Rajadamnern Stadium	Bangkok, Thailand	Decision	5	3:00
2011-09-13	Loss	(Thailand) Rittidet Wor.Wannathavee	Kiatpetch, Lumpinee Stadium	Bangkok, Thailand	Decision	5	3:00
2011-04-24	Win	(Thailand) Sayannoi 91Rungroj	Channel 7 Stadium	Bangkok, Thailand	Decision	5	3:00
2010-09-18	Loss	(Thailand) Khaimookdam Chuwattana	Omnoi Stadium	Samut Sakhon, Thailand	TKO	4	
2008-	Win	(Thailand) Nuenghtep EminentAir	Lumpinee Stadium	Thailand	KO	2	
2008-	Loss	(Thailand) Rungphet Wor Rungniran	Lumpinee Stadium	Thailand	TKO	4	
2008-03-25	Win	(Thailand) Amnuaydet Tded99	Lumpinee Stadium	Bangkok, Thailand	Decision	5	3:00
2008-	Win	(Thailand) Jockylek Kiatprapat	Rajadamnern Stadium	Bangkok, Thailand	Decision	5	3:00
2007-11-30	Loss	(Thailand) Kitti Kiatpraphat	Lumpinee Stadium	Bangkok, Thailand	Decision	5	3:00
2007-	Win	(Thailand) Worawut Sor	Rajadamnern Stadium	Bangkok, Thailand	Decision	5	3:00
Legend: Win Loss Draw/No contest Notes
