= Muangthai P.K. Saenchaimuaythaigym =

Thai Muay Thai fighter

- Born: Thanousin Jaroendee; 27 March 1994 (age 32); Nong Ki, Buriam, Thailand
- Native name: ธนูศิลป์ เจริญดี
- Other names: Muangthai Sor.Boonyiam
- Nickname: The Elbow Zombie (ขุนศอกผีดิบ); The Elbow King (???)
- Height: 172 cm (5 ft 8 in)
- Division: Light Flyweight; Super Flyweight; Super Featherweight; Lightweight
- Style: Muay Thai (Muay Sok)
- Stance: Southpaw
- Fighting out of: Bangkok, Thailand
- Team: PKSaenchaimuaythaigym

Kickboxing record
- Total: 256
- Wins: 207
- Losses: 47
- Draws: 2

Other information
- Occupation: Muay Thai fighter

Thanousin Jaroendee (Thai: ธนูศิลป์ เจริญดี; born 27 March 1994), known professionally as Muangthai P.K. Saenchaimuaythaigym (Thai: เมืองไทย พี.เค.แสนชัยมวยไทยยิม), is a Thai professional Muay Thai fighter currently signed to ONE Championship. He is a former Lumpinee Stadium Light Flyweight Champion who is known for his relentless pressure and vicious elbows.

== Muay Thai career ==
Muangthai has fought against such highly rated Muay Thai champions as Petpanomrung Kiatmuu9, Saeksan Or. Kwanmuang, Sangmanee Sor Tienpo, Pokaew Fonjangchonburi, Penek Sitnumnoi, Thanonchai Thor. Sangtiannoi, Superbank Mor Ratanabandit, Saen Parunchai and Superlek Kiatmuu9

Since 2014, Muangthai trains at P.K. Saenchai Muay Thai Gym, the same training camp of the legendary Muay Thai champion Saenchai Sor Kingstar, Kongsak Saenchaimuaythaigym, Wanchalong and Kaonar and other Muay Thai champions.

In July 2016, Muangthai was the #2 Super-feather weight ranked on Lumpinee Stadium by muaythai2000.com, also ranked #2 Super-Feather weight on Rajadamnern Stadium by muaythai2000.com.

On 27 September 2016, Muangthai was also ranked #1 Super-Feather weight in Thailand by muaythai2000.com.

== Titles and accomplishments ==
- Lumpinee Stadium
  - 2012 Lumpinee Stadium Light Flyweight (108 lbs) Champion
  - 2016 Lumpinee Stadium Fighter of the Year
  - 2017 Lumpinee Stadium Fighter of the Year
  - 2018 Lumpinee Stadium Fight of the Year (5 June vs Kulabdam Sor.Jor.Piek-U-Thai)
- Professional Boxing Association of Thailand (PAT)
  - 2017 Thailand Lightweight (135 lbs) Champion
- Channel 7 Boxing Stadium
  - 2014 Channel 7 Stadium Super Featherweight (130 lbs) Champion

== Fight record ==
Muay Thai record
207 wins, 46 losses, 2 draws
Date	Result	Opponent	Event	Location	Method	Round	Time
2026-09-11	Win	(Thailand) Saeksan Or. Kwanmuang	ONE The Inner Circle 30, Lumpinee Stadium	Bangkok, Thailand	TKO	3	
2026-06-26	Loss	(Thailand) Panrit Lukjaomaesaiwaree	ONE The Inner Circle 22, Lumpinee Stadium	Bangkok, Thailand	Decision (split)	3	3:00
2025-09-26	Loss	(Belarus) Antar Kacem	ONE Friday Fights 126, Lumpinee Stadium	Bangkok, Thailand	TKO (3 knockdowns)	3	2:27
2025-06-27	Win	(Thailand) Saeksan Or. Kwanmuang	ONE Friday Fights 114, Lumpinee Stadium	Bangkok, Thailand	Decision (unanimous)	3	3:00
2025-03-14	Win	(Russia) Ibragim Abdulmedzhidov	ONE Friday Fights 100, Lumpinee Stadium	Bangkok, Thailand	TKO (retirement)	3	1:06
2024-10-25	Win	(Thailand) Kongsuk Fairtex	ONE Friday Fights 84, Lumpinee Stadium	Bangkok, Thailand	TKO (left cross)	3	0:14
2024-04-05	Loss	(Thailand) Nakrob Fairtex	ONE Friday Fights 58, Lumpinee Stadium	Bangkok, Thailand	Decision (split)	3	3:00
2023-12-22	Loss	(Thailand) Nabil Anane	ONE Friday Fights 46, Lumpinee Stadium	Bangkok, Thailand	Decision (unanimous)	3	3:00
2023-09-22	Win	(Thailand) Yodlekpet Or. Pitisak	ONE Friday Fights 34, Lumpinee Stadium	Bangkok, Thailand	Decision (unanimous)	3	3:00
2023-06-23	Loss	(Scotland) Nico Carrillo	ONE Friday Fights 22, Lumpinee Stadium	Bangkok, Thailand	TKO (3 knockdowns)	2	1:23
2023-03-17	Win	(Thailand) Kulabdam Sor.Jor.Piek-U-Thai	ONE Friday Fights 9, Lumpinee Stadium	Bangkok, Thailand	KO (elbow)	3	1:37
2023-01-20	Win	(Uzbekistan) Mavlud Tupiev	ONE Friday Fights 1, Lumpinee Stadium	Bangkok, Thailand	Decision (unanimous)	3	3:00
2022-07-22	Win	(Russia) Vladimir Kuzmin	ONE 159	Kallang, Singapore	Decision (split)	3	3:00
2022-04-22	Loss	(England) Liam Harrison	ONE 156	Kallang, Singapore	TKO (3 knockdowns)	1	2:16
2020-02-09	Loss	(Thailand) Ferrari Jakrayanmuaythai	Srithammaracha + Kiatpetch Super Fight	Nakhon Si Thammarat, Thailand	Decision	5	3:00
2020-01-10	Win	(France) Brice Delval	ONE Championship: A New Tomorrow	Bangkok, Thailand	Decision (split)	3	3:00
2019-11-07	Loss	(Thailand) Nuenglanlek Jitmuangnon	Ruamponkon Prachin	Prachinburi, Thailand	KO (elbow)	4	
2019-10-05	Win	(Thailand) Ferrari Jakrayanmuaythai	Suek Muay Thai Vithee	Buriram, Thailand	Decision	5	3:00
2019-08-16	Win	(Japan) Kenta	ONE Championship: Dreams of Gold	Bangkok, Thailand	Decision (unanimous)	3	3:00
2019-05-23	Loss	(Thailand) Yodpanomrung Jitmuangnon	Rajadamnern Stadium	Bangkok, Thailand	Decision	5	3:00
2019-03-27	Loss	(Thailand) Nuenglanlek Jitmuangnon	Parunchai Birthday	Thung Song, Thailand	KO (elbow)	2	
2019-01-31	Win	(Thailand) Panpayak Jitmuangnon	Rajadamnern Stadium	Bangkok, Thailand	KO (left elbow)	3	
2018-12-21	Win	(Thailand) Panpayak Sitchefboontham	Rajadamnern Stadium	Bangkok, Thailand	Decision	5	
2018-11-09	Win	(Cyprus) Panicos Yusuf	ONE Championship: Heart of the Lion	Kallang, Singapore	Decision (unanimous)	3	3:00
2018-10-05	Loss	(Thailand) Superlek Kiatmuu9	Muaythai Expo	Buriram, Thailand	Decision	5	3:00
2018-09-04	Loss	(Thailand) Saeksan Or. Kwanmuang	Lumpineekiatphet, Lumpinee Stadium	Bangkok, Thailand	Decision	5	3:00
2018-07-06	Loss	(Thailand) Kulabdam Sor.Jor.Piek-U-Thai	Samui Super Fight	Koh Samui, Thailand	TKO (punches)	3	1:15
2018-06-05	Draw	(Thailand) Kulabdam Sor.Jor.Piek-U-Thai	Krikkrai Promotion, Lumpinee Stadium	Bangkok, Thailand	Decision	5	3:00
2018-03-06	Win	(Thailand) Mongkolpetch Petchyindee	Lumpineekiatphet, Lumpinee Stadium	Bangkok, Thailand	Decision	5	3:00
2018-01-26	Loss	(Thailand) Rambo Pet.Por.Tor.Or	Channel 7 Boxing Stadium	Bangkok, Thailand	Decision	5	3:00
2017-12-08	Draw	(Thailand) Superlek Kiatmuu9	61st Anniversary Of Lumpinee Stadium	Bangkok, Thailand	Decision	5	3:00
2017-11-07	Win	(Thailand) Kulabdam Sor.Jor.Piek-U-Thai	Petchkiatpetch Fight, Lumpinee Stadium	Bangkok, Thailand	Decision	5	3:00
2017-09-08	Loss	(Thailand) Superlek Kiatmuu9	Lumpinee Stadium	Bangkok, Thailand	Decision	5	3:00
2017-08-05	Win	(China) Han Zihao	Topking World Series	Thailand	Decision	3	3:00
2017-07-14	Loss	(Thailand) Saeksan Or. Kwanmuang		Koh Samui, Thailand	Decision	5	3:00
2017-05-05	Win	(Thailand) Yodlekpet Or. Pitisak	Kiatpetch Fight, Lumpinee Stadium	Bangkok, Thailand	Decision	5	3:00
2017-03-07	Win	(Thailand) Rambo Pet.Por.Tor.Or	Onesongchai Fight, Lumpinee Stadium	Bangkok, Thailand	Decision	5	3:00
Wins the Thailand Lightweight (135 lbs) title.
2017-02-11	Loss	(Thailand) Rambo Pet.Por.Tor.Or		Thailand	Decision	5	3:00
2017-01-24	Loss	(Thailand) Rambo Pet.Por.Tor.Or	Petchkiatpetch Fight, Lumpinee Stadium	Bangkok, Thailand	Decision	5	3:00
2016-12-09	Loss	(Thailand) Yodpanomrung Jitmuangnon	Lumpinee Stadium	Bangkok, Thailand	Decision	5	3:00
For the Thailand Lightweight (135 lbs) title.
2016-11-14	Win	(Thailand) Kaimukkao Por.Thairongruangkamai	Rajadamnern Stadium	Bangkok, Thailand	KO (left elbow)	3	1:00
2016-09-30	Win	(Thailand) Petpanomrung Kiatmuu9	Lumpinee Stadium	Bangkok, Thailand	KO (elbow)	2	1:22
2016-09-02	Win	(Thailand) Yodlekpet Or. Pitisak	Lumpinee Stadium	Bangkok, Thailand	Decision	5	3:00
2016-07-21	Win	(Thailand) Thaksinlek Kiatniwat	Rajadamnern Stadium	Bangkok, Thailand	KO (left elbow)	3	2:03
2016-06-09	Loss	(Thailand) Sangmanee Sor Tienpo	Rajadamnern Stadium	Bangkok, Thailand	TKO (referee stoppage)	4	
2016-03-28	Win	(Thailand) Saen Parunchai	Southern Thailand	Thailand	KO (left elbow)	4	0:13
2016-03-04	Win	(Thailand) Saen Parunchai	Kriekkrai Fights, Lumpinee Stadium	Bangkok, Thailand	Decision	5	3:00
2016-01-24	Win	(Thailand) Sangmanee Sor Tienpo	Samui Festival	Koh Samui, Thailand	Decision	5	3:00
2015-12-23	Win	(Thailand) Thaksinlek Kiatniwat	Rajadamnern Birthday Show, Rajadamnern Stadium	Bangkok, Thailand	KO (left elbow)	3	1:10
2015-11-10	Loss	(Thailand) Saeksan Or. Kwanmuang	Petkiatpet Fights, Lumpinee Stadium	Bangkok, Thailand	Decision	5	3:00
2015-10-14	Win	(Thailand) Phet Utong Or. Kwanmuang	Onesongchai Anniversary Show, Rajadamnern Stadium	Bangkok, Thailand	KO (right elbow)	3	2:18
2015-09-04	Loss	(Thailand) Sangmanee Sor Tienpo	Lumpinee Champion Krikkrai, Lumpinee Stadium	Bangkok, Thailand	Decision	5	3:00
2015-08-11	Loss	(Thailand) Kwankhao Mor.Ratanabandit	Petchyindee, Lumpinee Stadium	Bangkok, Thailand	Decision	5	3:00
2015-07-02	Win	(Thailand) Thanonchai Thanakorngym	Tor.Chaiwat , Rajadamnern Stadium	Bangkok, Thailand	Decision	5	3:00
2015-05-10	Loss	(Japan) Genji Umeno	Wanchai+PK MuayThai Super	Nagoya, Japan	TKO (punches)	4	1:09
2015-05-01	Loss	(Thailand) Saeksan Or. Kwanmuang	Southern Thailand	Thailand	Decision	5	3:00
2015-03-17	Win	(Thailand) Panphet Kiatjaroenchai	Lumpinee Stadium	Bangkok, Thailand	KO (right upper elbow)	4	1:36
2015-02-03	Win	(Thailand) Panphet Kiatjaroenchai	Lumpinee Stadium	Bangkok, Thailand	Decision	5	3:00
2015-01-08	Loss	(Thailand) Superbank Mor Ratanabandit	Onesongchai, Rajadamnern Stadium	Bangkok, Thailand	Decision	5	3:00
2014-12-09	Win	(Thailand) Penake Sitnumnoi	Lumpinee Stadium	Bangkok, Thailand	Decision	5	3:00
2014-10-31	Win	(Thailand) Tuanpae TheBestUdon	Lumpinee Stadium	Bangkok, Thailand	KO (left elbow + right high kick)	4	2:13
2014-09-30	Win	(Thailand) Yokwittaya Petchsimuan	Lumpinee Stadium	Bangkok, Thailand	Decision	5	3:00
2014-08-29	Win	(Thailand) Pokaew Fonjangchonburi	Lumpinee Stadium	Bangkok, Thailand	KO (left elbow)	2	1:45
2014-08-05	Loss	(Thailand) Pokaew Fonjangchonburi	Lumpinee Stadium	Bangkok, Thailand	Decision	5	3:00
2014-06-28	Loss	(Thailand) Yokwittaya Petchsimuan		Thailand	Decision	5	3:00
2014-06-01	Win	(Thailand) Chalamtong Sitpanont	Channel 7 Boxing Stadium	Bangkok, Thailand	Decision	5	3:00
Wins the Channel 7 Boxing Stadium Super Featherweight (130 lbs) title.
2014-05-02	Win	(Thailand) Grandprixnoi Pitakparpadaeng	Lumpinee Stadium	Bangkok, Thailand	KO (right elbow)	3	2:31
2014-	Loss	(Thailand) Tuanpae TheBestUdon	Channel 7 Boxing Stadium	Bangkok, Thailand	Decision	5	3:00
2014-01-12	Win	(Thailand) Saksuriya Kaiyanghadao	Channel 7 Boxing Stadium	Bangkok, Thailand	Decision	5	3:00
2013-11-10	Win	(Thailand) Tsunami Jor Chaiwat	Channel 7 Boxing Stadium	Bangkok, Thailand	KO (left elbow)		
2013-10-18	Loss	(Thailand) Jomphichit Chuwatana	Lumpinee Stadium	Bangkok, Thailand	Decision	5	3:00
2013-09-26	Loss	(Thailand) Jomphichit Chuwatana	Rajadamnern Stadium	Bangkok, Thailand	Decision	5	3:00
2013-08-30	Win	(Thailand) Monkaw Chor.Janmanee	Lumpinee Stadium	Bangkok, Thailand	Decision	5	3:00
2013-08-05	Loss	(Thailand) Thanonchai Thanakorngym	Rajadamnern Stadium	Bangkok, Thailand	Decision	5	3:00
2013-05	Win	(Thailand) Chaylek Kwaitonggym	Channel 7 Boxing Stadium	Bangkok, Thailand	KO		
2013-04-18	Loss	(Thailand) Lamnampong Noomjeantawana	Rajadamnern Stadium	Bangkok, Thailand	Decision	5	3:00
2013-03-22	Win	(Thailand) Ongbak Sitsarawatsua	Lumpinee Stadium	Bangkok, Thailand	Decision	5	3:00
2013-02-05	Loss	(Thailand) Suakim Sit Sor Tor Taew	Lumpinee Stadium	Bangkok, Thailand	TKO (referee stop./broken teeth)	3	0:38
2013-01-13	Loss	(Thailand) Ponkrit Chor.Chernkamon	Channel 7 Boxing Stadium	Bangkok, Thailand	Decision	5	3:00
2012-11-27	Win	(Thailand) Kengkart Sor Chokkitchai	Lumpinee Stadium	Bangkok, Thailand	KO (left elbow)	2	1:45
2012-11-06	Loss	(Thailand) Kengkla Por.Pekko	Lumpinee Stadium	Bangkok, Thailand	Decision	5	3:00
2012-10-09	Loss	(Thailand) Superlek Kiatmuu9	Lumpinee Stadium	Bangkok, Thailand	Decision	5	3:00
For the vacant Lumpinee Stadium Super Flyweight (115 lbs) title.
2012-09-07	Loss	(Thailand) Superlek Kiatmuu9	Lumpinee Stadium	Bangkok, Thailand	Decision	5	3:00
2012-08-10	Win	(Thailand) Ponkrit Chor.Chernkamon	Lumpinee Stadium	Bangkok, Thailand	Decision	5	3:00
2012-07-03	Win	(Thailand) Karn Kor.Kumpanart	Lumpinee Stadium	Bangkok, Thailand	Decision	5	3:00
2012-06-05	Win	(Thailand) Karn Kor.Kumpanart	Lumpinee Stadium	Bangkok, Thailand	Decision	5	3:00
2012-05-15	Win	(Thailand) Kengkla Por.Pekko	Lumpinee Stadium	Bangkok, Thailand	KO (right elbow)	3	
2012-04-20	Win	(Thailand) Jingreedtong Por.Worasing	Lumpinee Stadium	Bangkok, Thailand	TKO	3	
2012-03-09	Win	(Thailand) Kongburee Wor.Sungprapai	Lumpinee Stadium	Bangkok, Thailand	Decision	5	3:00
Wins the Lumpinee Stadium Light Flyweight (108 lbs) title.
2012-02-10	Win	(Thailand) Yodpaytai Chor.Patcharaphon	Lumpinee Stadium	Bangkok, Thailand	Decision	5	3:00
2012-01-17	Win	(Thailand) Yodpaytai Chor.Patcharaphon	Lumpinee Stadium	Bangkok, Thailand	Decision	5	3:00
2011-11-22	Loss	(Thailand) Sarawuth Pithakpabhadiang	Lumpinee Stadium	Bangkok, Thailand	Decision	5	3:00
2011-11-01	Win	(Thailand) Phetkarat Jitmuangnont	Lumpinee Stadium	Bangkok, Thailand	TKO	4	
2011-10-11	Win	(Thailand) Suakim Sitjaetaew	Lumpinee Stadium	Bangkok, Thailand	Decision	5	3:00
2011-09-06	Win	(Thailand) Suakim Sitjaetaew	Lumpinee Stadium	Bangkok, Thailand	KO (left elbow)	2	1:45
2011-07-22	Draw	(Thailand) Suakim Sitjaetaew	Lumpinee Stadium	Bangkok, Thailand	Decision	5	3:00
2011-06-28	Win	(Thailand) Suakim Sitjaetaew	Lumpinee Stadium	Bangkok, Thailand	Decision	5	3:00
2011-05-27	Win	(Thailand) Kanongsuek Sor.Sritong	Lumpinee Stadium	Bangkok, Thailand	Decision	5	3:00
2011-02-06	Win	(Thailand) Amata Por Tongboran	Channel 7 Boxing Stadium	Bangkok, Thailand	Decision	5	3:00
2010-10-26	Win	(Thailand) Chockchai Phetpracha	Lumpinee Stadium	Bangkok, Thailand	TKO	3	
2010-09-03	Loss	(Thailand) Kataphet Sor.Suradet	Lumpinee Stadium	Bangkok, Thailand	TKO	5	
2010-04-23	Win	(Thailand) Phetsiam Sakburirum	Lumpinee Stadium	Bangkok, Thailand	TKO	4	
Legend: Win Loss Draw/no contest Notes
