= Sangmanee Sor Tienpo =

Thai Muay Thai fighter

Sangmanee Sor.Tienpo
- Born: Pongsakon Sittidech; March 20, 1997 (age 29); Mancha Khiri, Khon Kaen Province, Thailand
- Native name: พงศกร สิทธิเดช
- Other names: Sangmanee Nor.Pummarint; Sangmanee Sathian Muay Thai Gym; Sangmanee SorCafeMuayThai; Sangmanee Klongsuanplu Resort; Sangmanee Sookdainailao
- Nickname: Million Dollar Baby (ทารกเงินล้าน)
- Height: 170 cm (5 ft 7 in)
- Division: Mini Flyweight; Light Flyweight; Flyweight; Super Flyweight; Lightweight; Super Lightweight
- Style: Muay Thai (Muay Femur)
- Stance: Southpaw
- Team: PK Saenchai Muay Thai Gym; Sathian Muay Thai Gym; Sangmanee Gym; 13 Coins Gym
- Years active: 2003–present

Kickboxing record
- Total: 260
- Wins: 201
- By knockout: 31
- Losses: 54
- Draws: 5

Pongsakon Sittidech (Thai: พงศกร สิทธิเดช; born March 20, 1997), known professionally as Sangmanee Sor.Tienpo (Thai: แสงมณี ส.เทียนโพธิ์) is a Thai professional Muay Thai fighter. He is a one-time Lumpinee Stadium champion and four-time Rajadamnern Stadium champion across five divisions. Nicknamed the "Million Dollar Baby", he was the 2012 Sports Writers Association of Thailand Fighter of the Year at the record young age of 15 years old.

Sangmanee currently fights out of the PK Saenchai Muay Thai Gym. He has previously trained with the Sathian and 13 Coins Gym.

== Biography ==
Sangmanee started to train on the age of 6, influenced by his father, a former Muay Thai fighter who discovered the talent his son possessed and began training Sangmanee at home.

At the age of 15, Sangmanee moved to 13 Coins Gym in Bangkok, a Muay Thai camp who had trained several champions, including the legendary Saenchai PKSaenchaimuaythaigym, where Sangmanee became the main star of the gym since Saenchai left 13 Coins and created his own gym.

On April 6, 2012, Sangmanee won his first major title when he defeated Phet Lukmakhamwan to capture the Lumpinee Stadium 105lbs title at 15 years old.

Not long after, on June 6, 2012, he defeated Dedkad Por Pongsawan to win the Rajadamnern Stadium 108lbs title.

On October 11, 2012, Sangmanee added another Muay Thai title to his résumé by defeating Kudsakornnoi Sor Junlasen for the S1 110lbs World Championship.

The following month, on November 9, 2012, he outscored Prajanchai P.K.SaenchaiMuaythaiGym for the Rajadamnern Stadium 112lbs title.

On December 7, 2012, he attempted to challenge Superlek Kiatmuu9 for the Lumpinee Stadium 115lbs title but lost by decision.

In 2012, Sangmanee had won a total of four Muay Thai titles, three of which were coveted stadium titles, in a span of less than 10 months and at only 15 years of age.

On February 21, 2013, he started the year by defeating Inseekao Rachanon for the Rajadamnern Stadium 115lbs title.

On February 28, 2014, Sangmanee took part in the Lumpinee King Fighter 4 Man Tournament featuring himself, Sam-A, Superlek and Superbank. He outpointed Superlek Kiatmuu9 to advance to the final where he beat Superbank Mor Ratanabandit later that night to win the tournament.

On December 1, 2014, Sangmanee nearly lost his life when he was poisoned before his match against Thanonchai Thor Sangtiennoi.

=== Top King World Series ===
Following his rise to prominence in Thai stadium scene, Sangmanee found more success competing in the Top King World Series tournaments. Overall, while competing in the Top King World Series, Sangmanee went 10–0–1.

He made his Top King World Series debut at TK3 in Hong Kong on December 20, 2014, where he defeated Man Kwok by unanimous decision.

Sangmanee later returned to compete at the Top King World Series on a long-term basis in 2017. On January 14, 2017, at TK12, he fought to a draw with future ONE Muay Thai bantamweight title contender Han Zihao.

=== ONE Championship ===
On September 16, 2019, Sangmanee signed a multi-fight contract with the Singapore-based organization ONE Championship to compete in the all-striking ONE Super Series format.

Sangmanee made his ONE debut on November 8, 2019, at ONE Championship: Masters of Fate. His opponent at the event was Azize Hlali, whom he went on to defeat by unanimous decision.

Sangmanee returned to fighting in Bangkok with ONE Championship for the first time at ONE Championship: A New Tomorrow January 10, 2020. In his first fight in Thailand since signing with ONE, Sangmanee defeated Kenta Yamada by unanimous decision, dominating the fight with a high volume of left kicks.

Sangmanee faced Kulabdam Sor.Jor.Piek-U-Thai in the semi-finals of the ONE Bantamweight Muay Thai Tournament at ONE Championship: No Surrender 3. He lost by first-round knockout.

Sangmanee faced Zhang Chenglong at ONE 161 on September 29, 2022. He won the close bout via split decision.

Sangmanee faced Kulabdam Sor.Jor.Piek-U-Thai in a rematch on January 27, 2023, at ONE Lumpinee 2. He lost the fight via unanimous decision.

=== RWS Championship ===
In 2025, Sangmanee won the 135lb title with RWS. Giving him his fifth recognised title. Upon, winning the title he challenged the 130lb champion to a superfight at 130lb, with the goal of becoming a concurrent dual champion.

Negotiations, saw the superfight take place, however at 135lb, with Sangmanee’s championship on the line.

On 31 May 2025, a RWS Superfight took place. Sangmanee was victorious and retained his title via split decision (46-48, 48-47; & 48-47).

== Titles and accomplishments ==
- True4U Muay Thai
  - 2017 True4U Lightweight (135 lbs) Champion
- Lumpinee Stadium
  - 2014 Lumpinee Stadium King Fighter 4 Man Tournament 124lbs Champion
  - 2012 Lumpinee Stadium Fighter of the Year
  - 2012 Lumpinee Stadium Mini Flyweight (105 lbs) Champion
- Rajadamnern Stadium
  - 2025 Rajadamnern Stadium Lightweight (135 lbs) Champion
    - Two successful title defenses
  - 2016 Rajadamnern Stadium Fight of the Year (vs Thanonchai Thanakorngym)
  - 2013 Rajadamnern Stadium Super Flyweight (115 lbs) Champion
  - 2012 Rajadamnern Stadium Fighter of the Year
  - 2012 Rajadamnern Stadium Flyweight (112lbs) Champion
  - 2012 Rajadamnern Stadium Light Flyweight (108 lbs) Champion
- Onesongchai Promotion
  - 2012 S1 World Championship 110lbs Champion
- Sports Writers of Thailand
  - 2012 Sports Writers of Thailand Fighter of the Year (shared with Yodwicha Por.Boonsit)

== Muay Thai record ==
Muay Thai record
201 Wins, 54 Losses, 5 Draws
| Date | Result | Opponent | Event | Location | Method | Round | Time |
| 2026-10-23 | Loss | (Japan) Yota Shigemori | Knock Out 69 | Tokyo, Japan | Decision (Unanimous) | 3 | 3:00 |
| 2026-09-12 | Loss | (United Kingdom) Anthony Deary | Hitman Fight League x YOKKAO 52 | Manchester, England | KO (Elbow) | 3 | |
For the vacant YOKKAO Super Lightweight (140 lbs) title.
| 2026-04-11 | Loss | (Russia) Egor Bikrev | Rajadamnern World Series, Rajadamnern Stadium | Bangkok, Thailand | KO (Body kick) | 1 | 0:48 |
Loses the Rajadamnern Stadium Lightweight (135 lbs) title.
| 2025-12-27 | Win | (Thailand) Somraknoi Muayded789 | Rajadamnern World Series, Rajadamnern Stadium 80th Anniversary | Bangkok, Thailand | Decision (Unanimous) | 5 | 3:00 |
Defends the Rajadamnern Stadium Lightweight (135 lbs) title.
| 2025-05-17 | Win | (Thailand) Chalam Parunchai | Rajadamnern World Series | Bangkok, Thailand | Decision (Split) | 5 | 3:00 |
Defends the Rajadamnern Stadium Lightweight (135 lbs) title.
| 2025-03-29 | Win | (Thailand) Thanupetch Wor.Sangprapai | Rajadamnern World Series | Bangkok, Thailand | Decision (Unanimous) | 5 | 3:00 |
For the vacant Rajadamnern Stadium Lightweight (135 lbs) title.
| 2024-12-28 | Win | (Iran) Mahdi Shirzad | Rajadamnern World Series, Rajadamnern Stadium | Bangkok, Thailand | Decision (Unanimous) | 3 | 3:00 |
| 2024-11-28 | Loss | (Thailand) Thanupetch Wor.Sangprapai | Petchyindee, Rajadamnern Stadium | Bangkok, Thailand | Decision | 5 | 3:00 |
| 2024-10-26 | Win | (Azerbaijan) Turach Novruzov | Rajadamnern World Series | Bangkok, Thailand | Decision (Unanimous) | 3 | 3:00 |
| 2024-09-14 | Win | (Australia) Jaga Chan | Rajadamnern World Series - Group Stage | Bangkok, Thailand | Decision (Unanimous) | 3 | 3:00 |
| 2024-08-10 | Loss | (England) Alfie Pearse | Rajadamnern World Series - Group Stage | Bangkok, Thailand | Decision (Unanimous) | 3 | 3:00 |
| 2023-05-05 | Loss | (Portugal) Fabio Reis | ONE Friday Fights 15, Lumpinee Stadium | Bangkok, Thailand | KO (Left hook) | 1 | 2:36 |
| 2023-01-27 | Loss | (Thailand) Kulabdam Sor.Jor.Piek-U-Thai | ONE Friday Fights 2, Lumpinee Stadium | Bangkok, Thailand | Decision (Unanimous) | 3 | 3:00 |
| 2022-09-29 | Win | (China) Zhang Chenglong | ONE 161 | Kallang, Singapore | Decision (Split) | 3 | 3:00 |
| 2022-08-02 | Loss | (Thailand) Yodlekphet Orr.Atchariya | Birthday Pitaktham Super Fight | Songkhla province, Thailand | Decision | 5 | 3:00 |
| 2022-06-20 | Win | (Thailand) Petchmanee Por.Lakboon | U-Muay RuamJaiKonRakMuayThai + Palangmai, Rajadamnern Stadium | Bangkok, Thailand | KO (Left Elbow) | 4 | |
| 2022-04-16 | Draw | (Thailand) Lamnamoonlek Tded99 | Sor.Sommai + Pitaktham | Phayao province, Thailand | Decision | 5 | 3:00 |
| 2022-03-11 | Win | (Thailand) Kongklai AnnyMuayThai | Pitaktham + Sor.Sommai + Palangmai | Songkhla province, Thailand | Decision | 5 | 3:00 |
| 2022-01-09 | Loss | (Thailand) Ferrari Fairtex | Channel 7 Stadium | Bangkok, Thailand | Decision | 5 | 3:00 |
| 2021-11-26 | Loss | (Thailand) Tapaokaew Singmawynn | Muay Thai Moradok Kon Thai + Rajadamnern Super Fight | Buriram, Thailand | Decision | 5 | 3:00 |
| 2021-03-12 | Loss | (Thailand) Rungkit Wor.Sanprapai | True4U Muaymanwansuk, Rangsit Stadium | Rangsit, Thailand | Decision | 5 | 3:00 |
| 2020-12-11 | Loss | (Thailand) Capitan PetchyindeeAcademy | True4U Muaymanwansuk, Rangsit Stadium | Rangsit, Thailand | Decision | 5 | 3:00 |
For the vacant True4U Light Welterweight (140lbs) title.
| 2020-11-05 | Win | (Thailand) Rungkit Wor.Sanprapai | True4U Muaymanwansuk, Rangsit Stadium | Rangsit, Thailand | Decision | 5 | 3:00 |
| 2020-09-26 | Loss | (Thailand) Tawanchai PK Saenchaimuaythaigym | Rueso Fight + Kiatpetch | Narathiwat Province, Thailand | Decision | 5 | 3:00 |
| 2020-07-31 | Loss | (Thailand) Kulabdam Sor.Jor.Piek-U-Thai | ONE Championship: No Surrender 3 | Bangkok, Thailand | KO (Left Cross) | 1 | 2:45 |
| 2020-02-28 | Loss | (Thailand) Thananchai Rachanon | Ruamponkonchon Pratan Super Fight | Pathum Thani, Thailand | Decision | 5 | 3:00 |
| 2020-01-10 | Win | (Japan) Kenta | ONE Championship: A New Tomorrow | Bangkok, Thailand | Decision (Unanimous) | 3 | 3:00 |
| 2019-11-08 | Win | (France) Azize Hlali | ONE Championship: Masters of Fate | Manila, Philippines | Decision (Unanimous) | 3 | 3:00 |
| 2019-10-05 | Win | (France) Rafi Bohic | Yod Muay Thai Naikhanomton | Buriram, Thailand | Decision | 5 | 3:00 |
| 2019-09-12 | Win | (Thailand) Yodpanomrung Jitmuangnon | Rajadamnern Stadium | Bangkok, Thailand | Decision | 5 | 3:00 |
| 2019-08-16 | Win | (Thailand) Yodlekpet Or. Pitisak | | Songkla, Thailand | Decision | 5 | 3:00 |
| 2019-06-26 | Win | (Thailand) Tawanchai PKSaenchaimuaythaigym | RuamponkonSamui + Kiatpetch Super Fight | Surat Thani, Thailand | Decision | 5 | 3:00 |
| 2019-05-10 | Win | (Thailand) Chujaroen Dabransarakarm | Lumpinee Stadium | Bangkok, Thailand | Decision | 5 | 3:00 |
| 2019-03-26 | Loss | (Thailand) Tawanchai PKSaenchaimuaythaigym | Parunchai Birthday | Thung Song, Thailand | TKO (High Kick) | 4 | |
| 2019-02-23 | Win | (Spain) Victor Conesa | Top King World Series - TK28 | Surat Thani Province, Thailand | TKO (referee Stoppage) | | |
| 2018-12-31 | Win | (Republic of Ireland) Martin Avery | Top King World Series - TK27 | Pattaya, Thailand | TKO | 2 | |
| 2018-11-29 | Loss | (Thailand) Yodlekpet Or. Pitisak | Rajadamnern Stadium | Bangkok, Thailand | Decision | 5 | 3:00 |
| 2018-11-08 | Win | (Thailand) Nuenglanlek Jitmuangnon | Rajadamnern Stadium | Bangkok, Thailand | Decision | 5 | 3:00 |
| 2018-09-22 | Win | (Brazil) Marlon Santos | Top King World Series - TK22 | Ko Samui, Thailand | TKO (Referee Stoppage/Left Kicks) | 3 | |
| 2018-08-07 | Loss | (Thailand) Yodpanomrung Jitmuangnon | | Songkhla, Thailand | Decision | 5 | 3:00 |
| 2018-06-28 | Loss | (Thailand) Yodlekpet Or. Pitisak | Rajadamnern Stadium | Bangkok, Thailand | Decision | 5 | 3:00 |
| 2018-05-26 | Win | (Kyrgyzstan) Timur Mamatisakov | Top King World Series - TK20 | Bangkok, Thailand | TKO (Doctor Stoppage/ Cut) | 2 | |
| 2018-04-28 | Win | (South Korea) Kim Dong Hwan | Top King World Series - TK19 | Mahasarakham, Thailand | TKO (Left Low Kick) | 2 | |
| 2018-03-17 | Win | (France) Awos Manso | Top King World Series - TK18 | Ayutthaya, Thailand | TKO (Referee Stoppage/Left Kicks) | 3 | |
| 2018-02-10 | Win | (Russia) Kirill Smirnov | Top King World Series - TK17 | Guangan, China | TKO (Referee Stoppage/Left High Kicks) | 3 | |
| 2018-01-18 | Loss | (Thailand) Yodlekpet Or. Pitisak | Rajadamnern Stadium | Bangkok, Thailand | Decision | 5 | 3:00 |
| 2017-11-06 | Draw | (Thailand) Panpayak Jitmuangnon | Rajadamnern Stadium | Bangkok, Thailand | Draw | 5 | 3:00 |
| 2017-09-30 | Win | (China) Han Zihao | Top King World Series - TK16 | Fuzhou, China | Decision | 3 | 3:00 |
| 2017-09-09 | Loss | (Thailand) Panpayak Jitmuangnon | Samui Fight | Koh Samet, Thailand | Decision | 5 | 3:00 |
| 2017-08-04 | Win | (Thailand) Kaimukkao Por.Thairongruangkamai | True4U MuaymanWansuk, Rangsit Stadium | Bangkok, Thailand | KO | 3 | |
Wins the True4U Lightweight (135 lbs) title.
| 2017-07-09 | Win | (Iran) Reza Momani | Top King World Series - TK14 | Chongqing, China | KO | 2 | |
| 2017-05-27 | Win | (South Africa) Ncedo Gomba | Top King World Series - TK13 | Chengdu, China | Decision | 3 | 3:00 |
| 2017-05-04 | Win | (Thailand) Kaimukkao Por.Thairongruangkamai | Rajadamnern Stadium | Bangkok, Thailand | Decision | 5 | 3:00 |
| 2017-04-06 | Loss | (Thailand) Superlek Kiatmuu9 | Rajadamnern Stadium | Bangkok, Thailand | Decision | 5 | 3:00 |
| 2017-01-14 | Draw | (China) Han Zihao | Top King World Series - TK12 Hohhot | Hohhot, China | Draw | 3 | 3:00 |
| 2016-12-21 | Win | (Thailand) Kongsak Saenchaimuaythaigym | Rajadamnern Stadium | Bangkok, Thailand | Decision | 5 | 3:00 |
| 2016-11-30 | Win | (Thailand) Changsuek Kiatsongrit | Rajadamnern Stadium | Bangkok, Thailand | TKO (knees) | 3 | |
| 2016-09-14 | Draw | (Thailand) Thanonchai Thanakorngym | Rajadamnern Stadium | Bangkok, Thailand | Draw | 5 | 3:00 |
| 2016-07-21 | Loss | (Thailand) Thanonchai Thanakorngym | Rajadamnern Stadium | Bangkok, Thailand | Decision | 5 | 3:00 |
| 2016-06-09 | Win | (Thailand) Muangthai PKSaenchaimuaythaigym | Onesongchai Fights, Rajadamnern Stadium | Bangkok, Thailand | TKO | 4 | |
| 2016-05-02 | Win | (Thailand) Panpayak Jitmuangnon | Jitmuangnon Fights, Rajadamnern Stadium | Bangkok, Thailand | Decision | 5 | 3:00 |
| 2016-03-31 | Win | (Thailand) Thanonchai Thanakorngym | Onesongchai Fights, Rajadamnern Stadium | Bangkok, Thailand | Decision | 5 | 3:00 |
| 2016-02-24 | Loss | (Thailand) Thanonchai Thanakorngym | Onesongchai Fights, Rajadamnern Stadium | Bangkok, Thailand | Decision | 5 | 3:00 |
| 2016-01-24 | Loss | (Thailand) Muangthai PKSaenchaimuaythaigym | Samui Festival | Koh Samui, Thailand | Decision | 5 | 3:00 |
| 2015-12-23 | Win | (Thailand) Saeksan Or. Kwanmuang | Rajadamnern Birthday Show, Rajadamnern Stadium | Bangkok, Thailand | Decision | 5 | 3:00 |
| 2015-11-19 | Loss | (Thailand) Thaksinlek Kiatniwat | Onesongchai Fights, Rajadamnern Stadium | Bangkok, Thailand | Decision | 5 | 3:00 |
| 2015-10-14 | Win | (Thailand) Thanonchai Thanakorngym | Onesongchai Anniversary Show, Rajadamnern Stadium | Bangkok, Thailand | Decision | 5 | 3:00 |
| 2015-09-04 | Win | (Thailand) Muangthai Por Lakboon | Kriekkrai Fights, Lumpinee Stadium | Bangkok, Thailand | Decision | 5 | 3:00 |
| 2015-08-07 | Win | (France) Ayoub El Khaidar | West Coast Fighting | Lacanau, France | Decision (Unanimous) | 5 | 3:00 |
| 2015-07-02 | Win | (Thailand) Saen Parunchai | Tor.Chaiwat Fight, Rajadamnern Stadium | Bangkok, Thailand | Decision | 5 | 3:00 |
| 2015-06-04 | Win | (Thailand) Phet Utong Or. Kwanmuang | Rajadamnern Stadium | Bangkok, Thailand | Decision | 5 | 3:00 |
| 2015-05-07 | Win | (Thailand) Jompichit Chuwattana | Rajadamnern Stadium | Bangkok, Thailand | Decision | 5 | 3:00 |
| 2015-03-30 | Win | (Thailand) Phet Utong Or. Kwanmuang | Rajadamnern Stadium | Bangkok, Thailand | Decision | 5 | 3:00 |
| 2014-12-20 | Win | (Hong Kong) Man Kwok | Topking World Series - TK3 Hong Kong | Hong Kong, China | Decision (Unanimous) | 3 | 3:00 |
| 2014-12-01 | Loss | (Thailand) Thanonchai Thor Sangtiennoi | Rajadamnern Stadium | Bangkok, Thailand | Decision | 5 | 3:00 |
| 2014-11-10 | Draw | (Thailand) Thanonchai Thor Sangtiennoi | Rajadamnern Stadium | Bangkok, Thailand | Draw | 5 | 3:00 |
| 2014-09-11 | Win | (Thailand) Phetmorakot Teeded99 | Rajadamnern Stadium | Bangkok, Thailand | Decision | 5 | 3:00 |
| 2014-08-14 | Loss | (Thailand) Luknimit Singklongsi | Rajadamnern Stadium | Bangkok, Thailand | Decision | 5 | 3:00 |
| 2014-06-25 | Loss | (Thailand) Thanonchai Thor Sangtiennoi | Rajadamnern Stadium | Bangkok, Thailand | Decision | 5 | 3:00 |
| 2014-06-02 | Loss | (Thailand) Thaksinlek Kiatniwat | Rajadamnern Stadium | Bangkok, Thailand | Decision | 5 | 3:00 |
| 2014-05-07 | Loss | (Thailand) Thaksinlek Kiatniwat | Rajadamnern Stadium | Bangkok, Thailand | Decision | 5 | 3:00 |
| 2014-03-30 | Loss | (Thailand) Sam-A Kaiyanghadaogym | Charity Event for School | Thailand | Decision | 5 | 3:00 |
| 2014-02-28 | Win | (Thailand) Superbank Mor Ratanabandit | Lumpinee Stadium King Fighter 4 man tournament, Final | Bangkok, Thailand | Decision | 3 | 3:00 |
Won the 124lbs. King Fighter New Lumpinee Stadium Inauguration 4-Man Tournament .
| 2014-02-28 | Win | (Thailand) Superlek Kiatmuu9 | Lumpinee Stadium King Fighter 4 man tournament, Semi Finals | Bangkok, Thailand | Decision | 3 | 3:00 |
| 2013-11-06 | Loss | (Thailand) Superbank Mor Ratanabandit | Rajadamnern Stadium | Bangkok, Thailand | Decision | 5 | 3:00 |
| 2013-09-11 | Win | (Thailand) Lamnammoon Sakchaichote | Rajadamnern Stadium | Bangkok, Thailand | Decision | 5 | 3:00 |
| 2013-08-05 | Win | (Thailand) Lamnammoon Sakchaichote | Rajadamnern Stadium | Bangkok, Thailand | Decision | 5 | 3:00 |
| 2013-07-09 | Win | (Thailand) Mongkolchai Kwaitonggym | Lumpinee Stadium | Bangkok, Thailand | KO (Left Body Knee) | 4 | 3:00 |
| 2013-06-03 | Win | (Thailand) Chatchainoi Sor.Jor.ToiPaetriew | Rajadamnern Stadium | Bangkok, Thailand | Decision | 5 | 3:00 |
| 2013-05-10 | Win | (Thailand) Wanchana Or Boonchuay | Lumpinee Stadium | Bangkok, Thailand | Decision | 5 | 3:00 |
| 2013-04-05 | Win | (Thailand) Prajanchai P.K.Saenchaimuaythaigym | Lumpinee Stadium | Bangkok, Thailand | Decision | 5 | 3:00 |
| 2013-02-21 | Win | (Thailand) Inseekao Rachanon | Rajadamnern Stadium | Bangkok, Thailand | Decision | 5 | 3:00 |
Won the Rajadamnern Stadium Super Flyweight (115 lbs) title.
| 2012-12-07 | Loss | (Thailand) Superlek Kiatmuu9 | Lumpinee Stadium | Bangkok, Thailand | Decision | 5 | 3:00 |
For the Lumpinee Stadium Super Flyweight (115 lbs) title.
| 2012-11-09 | Win | (Thailand) Prajanchai P.K.Saenchaimuaythaigym | Lumpinee Stadium | Bangkok, Thailand | Decision | 5 | 3:00 |
Won the Rajadamnern Stadium Flyweight (112 lbs) title.
| 2012-10-11 | Win | (Thailand) Kudsakornnoi Sor Junlasen | Rajadamnern Stadium | Bangkok, Thailand | Decision | 5 | 3:00 |
Won the S1 World Champion 110lbs title.
| 2012-09-17 | Win | (Thailand) Ruengsak Sitniwat | Rajadamnern Stadium | Bangkok, Thailand | KO | 3 | 3:00 |
| 2012-08-24 | Win | (Thailand) Phet Aikbangzai | Lumpinee Stadium | Bangkok, Thailand | Decision | 5 | 3:00 |
| 2012-07-26 | Win | (Thailand) Nikhomlek Tor Tawat | Rajadamnern Stadium | Bangkok, Thailand | Decision | 5 | 3:00 |
| 2012-06-28 | Win | (Thailand) Dedkart Por Pongsawang | Rajadamnern Stadium | Bangkok, Thailand | Decision | 5 | 3:00 |
| 2012-06-06 | Win | (Thailand) Dedkart Por Pongsawang | Wansongchai Fights, Rajadamnern Stadium | Bangkok, Thailand | Decision | 5 | 3:00 |
Won the Rajadamnern Stadium Light Flyweight (108 lbs) title.
| 2012-04-30 | Win | (Thailand) Kanongsuek Sor Sritong | Rajadamnern Stadium | Bangkok, Thailand | Decision | 5 | 3:00 |
| 2012-04-06 | Win | (Thailand) Phet Lukmakhamwan | Lumpinee Stadium | Bangkok, Thailand | Decision | 5 | 3:00 |
Won the vacant Lumpinee Stadium Mini Flyweight (105 lbs) title.
| 2012-03-08 | Loss | (Thailand) Nikhomlek Tor Tawat | Omnoi Stadium | Bangkok, Thailand | Decision | 5 | 3:00 |
| 2012-02-11 | Win | (Thailand) Phet Lukmakhamwan | Omnoi Stadium | Bangkok, Thailand | Decision | 5 | 3:00 |
| 2012-01-18 | Loss | (Thailand) Phet Lukmakhamwan | Rajadamnern Stadium | Bangkok, Thailand | Decision | 5 | 3:00 |
| 2011-04-29 | Win | (Thailand) Phanpichit Popbangkruay | Lumpinee Stadium | Bangkok, Thailand | Decision | 5 | 3:00 |
| 2011-03-15 | Win | (Thailand) Cherry Sitdarpauan | Lumpinee Stadium | Bangkok, Thailand | Decision | 5 | 3:00 |
| 2011-01-20 | Win | (Thailand) Dej Sor.Ploenjit | Rajadamnern Stadium | Bangkok, Thailand | Decision | 5 | 3:00 |
| 2010-12-24 | Loss | (Thailand) Klasiam Sor.Jor.Montree | Rajadamnern Stadium | Bangkok, Thailand | Decision | 5 | 3:00 |
| 2010-10-22 | Win | (Thailand) Banlantong Ror.Kilacorath | Lumpinee Stadium | Bangkok, Thailand | Decision | 5 | 3:00 |
| 2010-09-15 | Draw | (Thailand) Dej Sor.Ploenjit | Rajadamnern Stadium | Bangkok, Thailand | Decision | 5 | 3:00 |
| 2010-01-15 | Win | (Thailand) Superlek Santisurin | Phetsuphan, Lumpinee Stadium | Bangkok, Thailand | Decision | 5 | 3:00 |
Legend: Win Loss Draw/No contest Notes
