= Saeksan Or. Kwanmuang =

Thai Muay Thai fighter and professional kickboxer

Saeksan Or.Kwanmuang
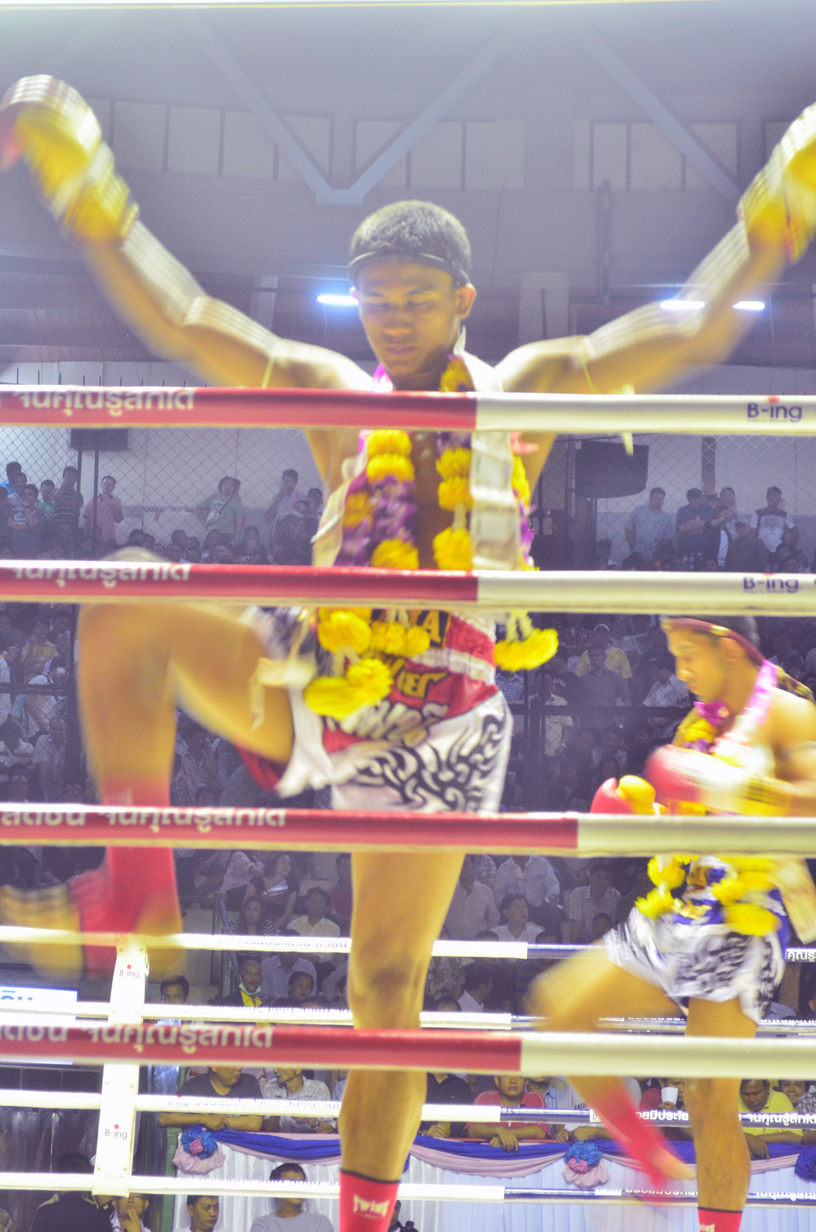
- Born: Wasan Isalam; 20 January 1989 (age 37); Nakhon Si Thammarat, Thailand
- Native name: วสันต์ อิสลาม
- Nickname: The Man Who Yields to No One (คนไม่ยอมคน); Nightmare of the Opponent (ฝันร้ายของคู่ชก); Robocop (โรโบคอป)
- Height: 170 cm (5 ft 7 in)
- Division: Flyweight; Super Bantamweight; Super Featherweight; Lightweight; Light Welterweight
- Style: Muay Thai (Muay Bouk)
- Stance: Orthodox
- Fighting out of: Bangkok, Thailand
- Team: Sor.Sommai Gym

Kickboxing record
- Total: 288
- Wins: 203
- Losses: 79
- Draws: 6

Wasan Isalam (Thai: วสันต์ อิสลาม; born 20 January 1989), known professionally as Saeksan Or. Kwanmuang (Thai: เสกสรร อ.ขวัญเมือง) is a retired Thai Muay Thai fighter and professional kickboxer. He is a former Rajadamnern Stadium champion. In 2015, he won the 'Fighter of the Year' award from the Sports Authority of Thailand. He was ranked a top 10 pound-for-pound Muay Thai fighter by The Nation in 2020.

== Biography and career ==
Saeksan started to train Muay Thai in a camp near of his home at the age of 9. He was introduced to the sport by his father and his older brother, who was also a fighter.

Saeksan is known as a Muay Bouk fighter (a fighter who blitzes with aggressive punching and elbow combinations); this fighting style helped turn him into a well-known fighter on the sporting circuit, receiving the nickname of Kon Mai Yom Kon (The Man Who Yields to No One)

In July 2016, Saeksan Or. Kwanmuang was ranked the #7 Super-feather weight ranked on Rajadamnern Stadium by muaythai2000.com, also ranked #7 Super Feather weight on Channel 7 Stadium by muaythai2000.com

In September 2016, Saeksan Or. Kwanmuang was ranked the #4 Super-feather weight in the world by wbcmuaythai.com.

On 15 November 2018, Saeksan Or. Kwanmuang won the Rajadamnern lightweight title (135 lbs.) against Panpayak Sitchefboontham. On 29 May 2019, Saeksan defended the Rajadamnern lightweight title (135 lbs.) against Kaonar Sor.Jor.Tongprajin.

On 16 August 2019; he was scheduled to fight Rodtang Jitmuangnon in Songkla. The bout was set at 134 lbs.

As of August 2020, he is ranked the #8 bantamweight kickboxer in the world by Combat Press. In December 2020, The Nation ranked him in their top 10 pound-for-pound fighter list in Muay Thai placing him 9th on the list.

In August 2023, he made Fight Record's ONE Power Rankings top 10 where he was tied for 9th place.

Saeksan faced Soe Lin Oo on 24 January 2025, at ONE 170. On 2 December, it was announced that Soe injuries sustained in a car accident and the fight was initially cancelled. Soe has been medically cleared for competition and the bout stepped back into the original pairing. At the weigh-ins, Soe weighed in at 142.5 pounds, 0.5 pounds over the 142 pounds limit and he was fined 20 percent his purse which went to Saeksan. He won the fight via unanimous decision.

Saeksan faced Asa Ten Pow on 5 April 2025, at ONE Fight Night 30. He lost the fight via technical knockout in round three.

== Titles and accomplishments ==
- Sports Authority of Thailand
  - 2015 Sports Authority of Thailand Fighter of the Year
- Rajadamnern Stadium
  - 2011 Rajadamnern Stadium Fight of the Year (vs. Kaimukkao Por.Thairongruangkamai)
  - 2012 Rajadamnern Stadium Fight of the Year (22 Dec vs. Singtongnoi Por.Telakun)
  - 2015 Rajadamnern Stadium Fight of the Year (12 Feb vs. Thanonchai Thanakorngym)
  - 2015 Rajadamnern Stadium Fighter of the Year
  - 2018 Rajadamnern Stadium Lightweight Champion (135 lbs)
  - 2019 Rajadamnern Stadium Fight of the Year (12 Sep vs. Rodtang Jitmuangnon)
  - 2020 Rajadamnern Stadium Lightweight Champion (135 lbs)
- Siam Omnoi Stadium
  - 2020 Omnoi Stadium 140 lbs Champion
- WBC Muaythai
  - 2018 WBC Muaythai Super-Lightweight World Championship (140 lbs)
  - 2018 WBC Muay Thai Fight of the Year (26 February vs. Panpayak Sitchefboontham)
  - 2017 IBF Muaythai Lightweight World Championship (135 lbs)
- Kunlun Fight
  - 2017 Kunlun Fight 61.5kg 8 Man Tournament Champion
- Muay Thai Warriors
  - 2012 Muay Thai Warriors Featherweight Champion (Two Title Defenses)
- Channel 7 Boxing Stadium
  - 2010 Channel 7 Super-Bantamweight Champion (122 lbs)
- ONE Championship
  - Performance of the Night (Four times) vs. Nathan Bendon, Sean Clancy, Silviu Vitez, Tyson Harrison
  - Most Wins in ONE Championship over a calendar year (8)
  - 2nd Longest active win streak in ONE Championship (8)

== Fight record ==
Kickboxing record
203 Wins, 79 Losses, 8 Draws
Date	Result	Opponent	Event	Location	Method	Round	Time
2026-09-11	Loss	(Thailand) Muangthai P.K. Saenchaimuaythaigym	ONE The Inner Circle 30, Lumpinee Stadium	Bangkok, Thailand	TKO	3	
2026-03-20	Loss	(Thailand) Pakorn P.K. Saenchai Muaythaigym	ONE Friday Fights 147, Lumpinee Stadium	Bangkok, Thailand	TKO (3 Knockdowns)	1	0:59
2025-09-26	Loss	(Thailand) Suablack Tor.Pran49	ONE Friday Fights 126, Lumpinee Stadium	Bangkok, Thailand	Decision (Unanimous)	3	3:00
2025-06-27	Loss	(Thailand) Muangthai P.K. Saenchaimuaythaigym	ONE Friday Fights 114, Lumpinee Stadium	Bangkok, Thailand	Decision (Unanimous)	3	3:00
2025-03-05	Loss	(United States) Asa Ten Pow	ONE Fight Night 30	Bangkok, Thailand	TKO (Punches)	3	0:37
2025-01-24	Win	(Myanmar) Soe Lin Oo	ONE 170	Bangkok, Thailand	Decision (Unanimous)	3	3:00
2024-09-06	Win	(United Kingdom) Liam Harrison	ONE 168	Denver, United States	TKO (3 Knockdowns)	2	
2024-04-05	Loss	(Japan) Yutaro Asahi	ONE Friday Fights 58, Lumpinee Stadium	Bangkok, Thailand	Decision (Unanimous)	3	3:00
2023-12-22	Win	(Australia) River Daz	ONE Friday Fights 46, Lumpinee Stadium	Bangkok, Thailand	Decision (Split)	3	3:00
2023-11-04	Win	(Algeria) Karim Bennoui	ONE Fight Night 16, Lumpinee Stadium	Bangkok, Thailand	Decision (Unanimous)	3	3:00
2023-09-22	Win	(Iran) Amir Naseri	ONE Friday Fights 34, Lumpinee Stadium	Bangkok, Thailand	Decision (Unanimous)	3	3:00
2023-08-18	Win	(Spain) Isaac Araya	ONE Friday Fights 29, Lumpinee Stadium	Bangkok, Thailand	TKO (Right cross)	2	0:46
2023-06-23	Win	(England) Nathan Bendon	ONE Friday Fights 22, Lumpinee Stadium	Bangkok, Thailand	Decision (Unanimous)	3	3:00
2023-04-28	Win	(Republic of Ireland) Sean Clancy	ONE Friday Fights 14, Lumpinee Stadium	Bangkok, Thailand	TKO (Doctor stoppage/cut)	2	
2023-03-17	Win	(Romania) Silviu Vitez	ONE Friday Fights 9, Lumpinee Stadium	Bangkok, Thailand	Decision (Unanimous)	3	3:00
2023-01-20	Win	(Australia) Tyson Harrison	ONE Friday Fights 1, Lumpinee Stadium	Bangkok, Thailand	Decision (Split)	3	3:00
2022-12-06	Win	(Thailand) Khunhanlek Kiatcharoenchai	Muay Thai Lumpinee Pitaktam, Lumpinee Stadium	Bangkok, Thailand	Decision	5	3:00
2022-11-06	Draw	(Cambodia) Lao Chetra	Kun Khmer All Star	Phnom Penh, Cambodia	Decision	3	3:00
2022-09-22	Win	(Thailand) Prabsuk Siopol		Surat Thani province, Thailand	Decision	5	3:00
2022-08-02	Win	(Thailand) Petchmuangsri Tded99	Birthday Pitaktham Super Fight	Songkhla province, Thailand	Decision	5	3:00
2022-06-15	Win	(Italy) Mathias Gallo Cassarino	Palangmai, Rajadamnern Stadium	Bangkok, Thailand	Decision	5	3:00
2022-05-21	Draw	(Cambodia) Lao Chetra		Pahang, Malaysia	Decision	5	3:00
2022-04-23	Loss	(Scotland) Nico Carrillo	Siam Warriors	Cork City, Ireland	Decision (Unanimous)	5	3:00
2022-03-11	Win	(Thailand) Petchmahachon Jitmuangnon	Pitaktham + Sor.Sommai + Palangmai	Songkhla province, Thailand	Decision	5	3:00
2021-12-30	Loss	(Thailand) Patakthep Pakbangkakaw	Muay Thai SAT Super Fight WiteetinThai	Phuket, Thailand	Decision	5	3:00
2021-11-26	Loss	(Thailand) Thanonchai Fairtex	Muay Thai Moradok Kon Thai + Rajadamnern Super Fight	Buriram, Thailand	Decision	5	3:00
2021-10-03	Loss	(Thailand) Kulabdam Sor.Jor.Piek-U-Thai	Channel 7 Stadium	Bangkok, Thailand	Decision	5	3:00
2021-04-02	Loss	(Thailand) Petchmahachon Jitmuangnon	Pitaktam, Lumpinee Stadium	Bangkok, Thailand	Decision	5	3:00
2020-11-17	Loss	(Thailand) Yodlekpet Or. Pitisak	Sor.Sommai, CentralPlaza Nakhon Ratchasima	Nakhon Ratchasima, Thailand	Decision	5	3:00
2020-10-10	Loss	(Thailand) Kongklai AnnyMuayThai	Siam Omnoi Stadium	Bangkok, Thailand	Decision (Unanimous)	5	3:00
Lost Siam Omnoi Stadium 140lbs title.
2020-09-10	Loss	(Thailand) Kongklai AnnyMuayThai	Sor.Sommai Birthday, Rajadamnern Stadium	Bangkok, Thailand	KO (Right Cross)	4	
2020-07-18	Win	(Thailand) Thanonchai Thanakorngym	Siam Omnoi Stadium	Bangkok, Thailand	Decision	5	3:00
Wins the vacant Siam Omnoi Stadium 140lbs title.
2020-03-05	Win	(Thailand) Thanonchai Thanakorngym	Rajadamnern Stadium	Bangkok, Thailand	KO (Right Elbow)	3	
Wins the vacant Rajadamnern Stadium 135lbs title.
2020-01-31	Win	(Thailand) Thanonchai Thanakorngym	Phuket Super Fight Real Muay Thai	Mueang Phuket District, Thailand	Decision	5	3:00
2019-12-23	Loss	(Thailand) Rungkit Wor.Sanprapai	Rajadamnern Stadium	Bangkok, Thailand	Decision (Unanimous)	5	3:00
2019-11-07	Loss	(Thailand) Kaonar P.K.SaenchaiMuaythaiGym	Ruamponkon Prachin	Prachinburi, Thailand	Decision	5	3:00
2019-09-12	Loss	(Thailand) Rodtang Jitmuangnon	Rajadamnern Stadium	Bangkok, Thailand	Decision (Unanimous)	5	3:00
2019-08-16	Loss	(Thailand) Rodtang Jitmuangnon	Supit + Sor. Sommai Birthday Fights	Songkhla, Thailand	Decision	5	3:00
2019-07-21	Loss	(Japan) Taiju Shiratori	Rise World Series 2019 Semi Finals	Osaka, Japan	Decision (Unanimous)	3	3:00
2019-05-29	Win	(Thailand) Kaonar P.K.SaenchaiMuaythaiGym	Rajadamnern Stadium	Bangkok, Thailand	Decision	5	3:00
Defends the Rajadamnern Stadium 135lbs title.
2019-03-10	Win	(Japan) Taiga	Rise World Series 2019 First Round	Tokyo, Japan	Decision (Unanimous)	3	3:00
2018-12-20	Win	(Thailand) Yodlekpet Or. Pitisak	Rajadamnern Stadium	Bangkok, Thailand	Decision	5	3:00
2018-11-15	Win	(Thailand) Panpayak Sitchefboontham	Rajadamnern Stadium	Bangkok, Thailand	Decision	5	3:00
Wins the vacant Rajadamnern Stadium Lightweight Champion (135 lbs).
2018-09-27	Loss	(Thailand) Kaonar P.K.SaenchaiMuaythaiGym	Rajadamnern Stadium	Bangkok, Thailand	Decision	5	3:00
2018-09-04	Win	(Thailand) Muangthai PKSaenchaimuaythaigym	Lumpinee Stadium	Bangkok, Thailand	Decision	5	3:00
2018-07-25	Loss	(Thailand) Kaonar P.K.SaenchaiMuaythaiGym	Rajadamnern Stadium	Bangkok, Thailand	Decision	5	3:00
2018-06-28	Draw	(Thailand) Kaonar P.K.SaenchaiMuaythaiGym	Rajadamnern Stadium	Bangkok, Thailand	Decision	5	3:00
2018-05-13	Loss	(China) Zhao Chongyang	Kunlun Fight 74 - 61.5kg 8 Man Tournament, Quarter Finals	Jinan, China	Decision (Majority)	3	3:00
2018-04-28	Win	(Thailand) Rodlek PKSaenchaimuaythaigym	Phoenix 7 Phuket, Patong Boxing Stadium	Phuket, Thailand	Decision	5	3:00
Wins the WBC Muaythai Super-Lightweight World Championship.
2018-03-22	Win	(Thailand) Panpayak Sitchefboontham	Rajadamnern Stadium	Bangkok, Thailand	Decision	5	3:00
2018-02-26	Loss	(Thailand) Panpayak Sitchefboontham	Rajadamnern Stadium	Bangkok, Thailand	Decision	5	3:00
Fight Was For the WBC Muaythai Lightweight World Championship and Phoenix Fighting Lightweight Championship.
2017-12-21	Win	(Thailand) Panpayak Sitchefboontham	Rajadamnern Stadium	Bangkok, Thailand	Decision	5	3:00
Wins the IBF Muaythai Lightweight World Championship.
2017-11-05	Win	(China) Wang Wenfeng	Kunlun Fight 66 - 61.5 kg 8 Man Tournament, Final	Wuhan, China	Decision (Majority)	3	3:00
Wins the Kunlun Fight 61.5kg 8 Man Tournament Champion.
2017-11-05	Win	(China) Jiao Daobo	Kunlun Fight 66 - 61.5 kg 8 Man Tournament, Semi Finals	Wuhan, China	Decision (Unanimous)	3	3:00
2017-11-05	Win	(China) Yang Guang	Kunlun Fight 66 - 61.5 kg 8 Man Tournament, Quarter Finals	Wuhan, China	Decision (Unanimous)	3	3:00
2017-09-10	Win	(Thailand) Rodlek Jaotalaytong	Phetchbuncha Stadium	Ko Samui, Thailand	Decision	5	3:00
2017-08-07	Loss	(Australia) Chadd Collins	Rajadamnern Stadium	Bangkok, Thailand	Decision	5	3:00
2017-07-14	Win	(Thailand) Muangthai PKSaenchaimuaythaigym		Ko Samui, Thailand	Decision	5	3:00
2017-05-31	Loss	(Thailand) Panpayak Jitmuangnon	Rajadamnern Stadium	Bangkok, Thailand	Decision	5	3:00
2017-05-03	Win	(Thailand) Superbank Mor Ratanabandit	Rajadamnern Stadium	Bangkok, Thailand	Decision	5	3:00
2017-02-22	Loss	(Thailand) Rodlek Jaotalaytong	Rajadamnern Stadium	Bangkok, Thailand	Decision	5	3:00
2017-01-26	Draw	(Thailand) Superbank Mor Ratanabandit	Rajadamnern Stadium	Bangkok, Thailand	Decision	5	3:00
2016-12-22	Win	(Thailand) Yodlekpet Or. Pitisak	Rajadamnern Stadium	Bangkok, Thailand	Decision	5	3:00
2016-11-14	Loss	(Thailand) Superlek Kiatmuu9	Rajadamnern Stadium	Bangkok, Thailand	Decision	5	3:00
2016-09-23	Loss	(Thailand) Superlek Kiatmuu9	Lumpinee Stadium	Bangkok, Thailand	Decision	5	3:00
Fight Was For WBC Muaythai Super-Featherweight World Championship. .
2016-08-05	Win	(Thailand) Rodlek Jaotalaytong	Kiatpetch Show	Hat Yai, Thailand	Decision	5	3:00
2016-07-03	Win	(Sweden) Sammon Decker	MAX Muay Thai Stadium	Pattaya, Thailand	Decision	5	3:00
2016-06-03	Loss	(Thailand) Rodlek Jaotalaytong	Lumpinee Stadium	Bangkok, Thailand	Decision	5	3:00
2016-02-24	Win	(Thailand) Thaksinlek Kiatniwat	Rajadamnern Stadium	Bangkok, Thailand	Decision	5	3:00
2016-01-24	Loss	(Thailand) Thanonchai Thanakorngym	Samui Festival	Koh Samui, Thailand	Decision	5	3:00
2015-12-23	Loss	(Thailand) Sangmanee Sor Tienpo	Rajadamnern Stadium	Bangkok, Thailand	Decision	5	3:00
2015-11-10	Win	(Thailand) Muangthai PKSaenchaimuaythaigym	Lumpinee Stadium	Bangkok, Thailand	Decision	5	3:00
2015-09-10	Win	(Japan) Genji Umeno	Rajadamnern Stadium	Bangkok, Thailand	Decision	5	3:00
2015-08-13	Win	(Thailand) Songkom Nayoksanya	Rajadamnern Stadium	Bangkok, Thailand	Decision	5	3:00
2015-07-01	Win	(Belarus) Andrei Zayats	T-One Muay Thai	Beijing, China	TKO (Left Body Knee)	3	0:20
2015-06-04	Draw	(Thailand) Thanonchai Thanakorngym	Rajadamnern Stadium	Bangkok, Thailand	Decision	5	3:00
2015-05-01	Win	(Thailand) Muangthai PKSaenchaimuaythaigym		Thailand	Decision	5	3:00
2015-02-12	Loss	(Thailand) Thanonchai Thanakorngym	Rajadamnern Stadium	Bangkok, Thailand	Decision	5	3:00
2014-12-24	Win	(Thailand) Songkom Nayoksanya	Rajadamnern Stadium	Bangkok, Thailand	Decision	5	3:00
2014-11-25	Loss	(Thailand) Phetmorakot Wor Sangprapai	Lumpinee Stadium	Bangkok, Thailand	Decision	5	3:00
2014-09-11	Win	(Thailand) Kongsak Saenchaimuaythaigym	Rajadamnern Stadium	Bangkok, Thailand	Decision	5	3:00
2014-08-13	Win	(Thailand) Phetmorakot Wor Sangprapai	Rajadamnern Stadium	Bangkok, Thailand	Decision	5	3:00
2014-06-12	Draw	(Thailand) Superbank Mor Ratanabandit	Rajadamnern Stadium	Bangkok, Thailand	Decision	5	3:00
2014-05-02	Loss	(Thailand) Pakorn PKSaenchaimuaythaigym	Lumpinee Stadium	Bangkok, Thailand	Decision	5	3:00
2014-04-04	Win	(Thailand) Pakorn PKSaenchaimuaythaigym	Petyindee and Onesongchai Promotions	Songkla, Thailand	Decision	5	3:00
2013-11-08	Win	(Thailand) Penake Sitnumnoi	Lumpinee Stadium	Bangkok, Thailand	KO (Overhand Right)	2	1:40
2013-10-11	Win	(Thailand) Kaimukkao Por.Thairongruangkamai	Lumpinee Stadium	Bangkok, Thailand	KO (Left Elbow)	1	3:00
2013-07-26	Win	(China) Kuan Shunping	Muay Thai Warriors	Bangkok, Thailand	KO (Jumping Knee to the Body)	1	2:20
Defends the Muay Thai Warriors 136lbs. belt.
2013-05-31	Win	(Thailand) Detnarong Wor Sangprapai	Petyindee and Onesongchai Promotions	Koh Samui, Thailand	Decision	5	3:00
2013-05-10	Loss	(Thailand) Petpanomrung Kiatmuu9	Lumpinee Stadium	Bangkok, Thailand	Decision	5	3:00
2013-04-05	Win	(Republic of Ireland) Stephen Meleady	Muay Thai Warriors	China	KO (Spinning Back Elbow)	4	0:52
Defends the Muay Thai Warriors 136lbs. belt.
2013-02-21	Win	(Thailand) Singtongnoi Por.Telakun	Rajadamnern Stadium	Bangkok, Thailand	Decision	5	3:00
2012-12-24	Draw	(Thailand) Pettawee Sor Kittichai	Rajadamnern Stadium	Bangkok, Thailand	Decision	5	3:00
2012-11-30	Loss	(Thailand) Singtongnoi Por.Telakun	Lumpinee Stadium	Bangkok, Thailand	Decision	5	3:00
2012-11-09	Win	(Thailand) Singtongnoi Por.Telakun	Lumpinee Stadium	Bangkok, Thailand	Decision	5	3:00
2012-09-12	Loss	(Thailand) Kongsak Saenchaimuaythaigym	Rajadamnern Stadium	Bangkok, Thailand	Decision	5	3:00
2012-08-19	Win	(Suriname) Sergio Wielzen	Muay Thai Warriors	China	KO (Right elbow)	3	
Wins The Vacant Muay Thai Warriors 136lbs. belt.
2012-05-17	Win	(Thailand) Yodwicha Por Boonsit	Rajadamnern Stadium	Bangkok, Thailand	Decision	5	3:00
2012-04-03	Win	(Thailand) Thongchai Sitsongpeenong	Lumpinee Stadium	Bangkok, Thailand	Decision	5	3:00
2012-03-09	Win	(Thailand) Thongchai Sitsongpeenong	Lumpinee Stadium	Bangkok, Thailand	Decision	5	3:00
2012-01-17	Loss	(Thailand) Penake Sitnumnoi	Lumpinee Stadium	Bangkok, Thailand	Decision	5	3:00
2011-12-22	Loss	(Thailand) Singtongnoi Por.Telakun	Rajadamnern Stadium	Bangkok, Thailand	Decision	5	3:00
2011-09-01	Win	(Thailand) Kaimukkao Por.Thairongruangkamai	Rajadamnern Stadium	Bangkok, Thailand	KO (Straight Right)	2	1:10
2011-04-28	Loss	(Thailand) Tapaotong Eminentair	Rajadamnern Stadium	Bangkok, Thailand	Decision	5	3:00
2011-03-31	Loss	(Thailand) Rungruanglek Lukprabat	Rajadamnern Stadium	Bangkok, Thailand	Decision	5	3:00
2010-12-23	Win	(Thailand) Farsung Sor.Tawanrong	Rajadamnern Stadium Birthday event	Bangkok, Thailand	TKO	2	
2010-09-03	Win	(Thailand) Ritidet Wor. Wanthavee	Lumpinee Stadium	Bangkok, Thailand	Decision	5	3:00
2010-06-27	Draw	(Thailand) Ritidet Wor. Wanthavee	Channel 7 Stadium	Bangkok, Thailand	Decision	5	3:00
2010-04-25	Loss	(Thailand) Kaodaeng SuraphitFarm	Channel 7 Stadium	Bangkok, Thailand	Decision	5	3:00
2010-03-07	Win	(Thailand) Metawee Wor.Sangprapai	Channel 7 Stadium	Bangkok, Thailand	Decision	5	3:00
Wins Channel 7 Stadium 122 lbs. belt.
2009-11-23	Loss	(Thailand) Tomas Sor. Chaijaroen	Rajadamnern Stadium	Bangkok, Thailand	Decision	5	3:00
2009-10-12	Win	(Thailand) Lookton Aikbangzai	Rajadamnern Stadium	Bangkok, Thailand	Decision	5	3:00
2009-08-31	Win	(Thailand) Rungrat Tor.Pitakkonkan	Rajadamnern Stadium	Bangkok, Thailand	Decision	5	3:00
2009-05-25	Win	(Thailand) Tomas Sor. Chaijaroen	Rajadamnern Stadium	Bangkok, Thailand	Decision	5	3:00
2009-05-01	Win	(Thailand) Nongbeer Choknamwong	Lumpinee Stadium	Bangkok, Thailand	Decision	5	3:00
2009-02-02	Win	(Thailand) Jampatong Mueangsima	Rajadamnern Stadium	Bangkok, Thailand	Decision	5	3:00
2008-12-10	Win	(Thailand) Doungpichid Or. Siripon	Rajadamnern Stadium	Bangkok, Thailand	Decision	5	3:00
2008-09-19	Win	(Thailand) Kongsak Sitboonmee	Lumpinee Stadium	Bangkok, Thailand	Decision	5	3:00
2008-07-29	Win	(Thailand) Natthapon Por Puanruamsang	Phetyindee Fights, Lumpinee Stadium	Bangkok, Thailand	Decision	5	3:00
2008-05-02	Win	(Thailand) Liemphet Sitboonmee	Lumpinee Stadium	Bangkok, Thailand	Decision	5	3:00
2008-03-11	Win	(Thailand) Kaotam Lookprabaht	Wanboonya Fights, Lumpinee Stadium	Bangkok, Thailand	Decision	5	3:00
2008-02-13	Loss	(Thailand) Sitthichai Sitsongpeenong	Sor Sommay Fights, Rajadamnern Stadium	Bangkok, Thailand	Decision	5	3:00
2007-12-14	Loss	(Thailand) Chanasuk Sitpalangnum	Phetsupapan, Lumpinee Stadium	Bangkok, Thailand	Decision	5	3:00
2007-09-28	Loss	(Thailand) Pongsiri Por.Siripong	Lumpinee Stadium	Bangkok, Thailand	Decision	5	3:00
For the Thailand 112 lbs title.
2007-07-23	Win	(Thailand) Silarit Sor.Suradeth	Rajadamnern Stadium	Bangkok, Thailand	Decision	5	3:00
2007-06-22	Win	(Thailand) Pongsiri Por.Siripong	Phetsupapan, Lumpinee Stadium	Bangkok, Thailand	Decision	5	3:00
2007-04-23	Win	(Thailand) Pongsiri Por.Siripong	Rajadamnern Stadium	Bangkok, Thailand	Decision	5	3:00
2007-03-23	Win	(Thailand) Mungkornkhao Sor.Saksan	Lumpinee Stadium	Bangkok, Thailand	Decision	5	3:00
2006-12-08	Win	(Thailand) Tawanchay Sakhiranchai	Lumpinee Stadium	Bangkok, Thailand	Decision	5	3:00
2006-10-13	Win	(Thailand) Sanganan Lookbanyai	Lumpinee Stadium	Bangkok, Thailand	Decision	5	3:00
2006-08-28	Win	(Thailand) Wanchailak Kiatphukham	Lumpinee Stadium	Bangkok, Thailand	Decision	5	3:00
2006-04-07	Win	(Thailand) Wanchailak Kiatphukham	Lumpinee Stadium	Bangkok, Thailand	Decision	5	3:00
2006-03-17	Win	(Thailand) Wanchailak Kiatphukham	Lumpinee Stadium	Bangkok, Thailand	Decision	5	3:00
2006-02-21	Loss	(Thailand) Sripattanalak Kiat Por.Chaideat	Lumpinee Stadium	Bangkok, Thailand	Decision	5	3:00
2005-12-23	Win	(Thailand) Artapon Por.Khumpai	Lumpinee Stadium	Bangkok, Thailand	Decision	5	3:00
Legend: Win Loss Draw/No contest Notes
