= Suakim Sor.Jor.Tongprajin =

Muay Thai fighter (b. 1995)

Suakim PK Saenchaimuaythaigym
- Born: Chanon Meechai; August 15, 1995 (age 31); Chanthaburi Province, Thailand
- Other names: Suakim Sit Sor Tor Taew; Serkim Sit Sor Thor Taew; Suakim Sitjaetaew (เสือคิม ศิษย์เจ๊แต๋ว)
- Height: 172 cm (5 ft 7 1/2 in)
- Weight: 65 kg (143 lb; 10.2 st)
- Division: Super Flyweight; Bantamweight; Super Bantamweight; Featherweight; Super Featherweight; Lightweight; Super Lightweight; Welterweight
- Style: Muay Thai
- Fighting out of: Bangkok, Thailand
- Team: PK Saenchaimuaythaigym

Kickboxing record
- Total: 139
- Wins: 111
- Losses: 25
- Draws: 3

Suakim (เสือคิม) is a Thai Muay Thai fighter. He currently competes in the Bantamweight division of ONE Championship. He is a former 3-division Lumpinee Stadium champion, having won titles at bantamweight, super bantamweight, and super featherweight. As of September 22, 2026, he is ranked #2 in the ONE Bantamweight Muay Thai rankings.

Aside from the Thai stadium circuit, Suakim has also fought in Japan's RISE World Series in 2019.

== Titles and accomplishments ==
- The Battle Of Muaythai (BOM)
  - 2019 BOM Super Lightweight 63 kg Champion
- Lumpinee Stadium
  - 2018 Lumpinee Stadium 130 lbs Champion
  - 2014 Lumpinee Stadium 122 lbs Champion
  - 2013 Lumpinee Stadium 118 lbs Champion
- Professional Boxing Association of Thailand (PAT)
  - 2016 Thailand 122 lbs Champion
- Channel 7 Boxing Stadium
  - 2014 Channel 7 Stadium 122 lbs Champion

== Fight record ==
Muay Thai and Kickboxing record
111 Wins, 25 Losses, 3 Draws
Date	Result	Opponent	Event	Location	Method	Round	Time
2026-08-07	Win	(Thailand) Nabil Anane	ONE: The Inner Circle 25	Bangkok, Thailand	Decision (Split)	3	3:00
2026-04-11	Win	(Russia) Vladimir Kuzmin	ONE Fight Night 42	Bangkok, Thailand	Decision (Unanimous)	3	3:00
2025-11-16	Win	(Canada) Jake Peacock	ONE 173	Tokyo, Japan	TKO (Punch)	3	0:26
2025-08-02	Win	(Turkey) Zafer Sayik	ONE Fight Night 34	Bangkok, Thailand	Decision (Unanimous)	3	3:00
2025-03-14	Win	(Thailand) Komawut FA Group	ONE Friday Fights 100, Lumpinee Stadium	Bangkok, Thailand	TKO (Elbows)	2	0:30
2024-12-07	Win	(Thailand) Panrit Lukjaomaesaiwaree	ONE Friday Fights 92, Lumpinee Stadium	Bangkok, Thailand	KO (Left hook)	2	2:57
2024-09-27	Win	(England) Otis Wanghorn	ONE Friday Fights 81, Lumpinee Stadium	Bangkok, Thailand	Decision (Majority)	3	3:00
2024-04-26	Win	(Turkey) Deniz Demirkapu	ONE Friday Fights 60, Lumpinee Stadium	Bangkok, Thailand	KO (Left hook)	2	1:22
2024-01-12	Loss	(Russia) Alexey Balyko	ONE Friday Fights 47, Lumpinee Stadium	Bangkok, Thailand	KO (Left hook)	3	0:22
2023-09-22	Win	(Iran) Saman Ashouri	ONE Friday Fights 34, Lumpinee Stadium	Bangkok, Thailand	TKO (Elbow + punches)	1	2:15
2023-07-21	Loss	(Russia) Kirill Khomutov	ONE Friday Fights 26, Lumpinee Stadium	Bangkok, Thailand	KO (Left hook)	2	0:58
2019-12-08	Win	(South Korea) Chan Hyung Lee	BOM 2-6～THE Battle Of Muaythai SEASON II vol.6	Tokyo, Japan	TKO (retirement)	3	3:00
Wins BOM Super Lightweight title
2019-11-07	Loss	(Thailand) Superlek Kiatmuu9	Ruamponkon Prachin	Prachinburi, Thailand	Decision	5	3:00
2019-10-05	Win	(Thailand) Rungkit Wor.Sanprapai	Yod Muay Thai Naikhanomton	Buriram, Thailand	Decision	5	3:00
2019-09-16	Win	(Ukraine) Nikita Sapun	Rise World Series 2019 Final Round	Tokyo, Japan	KO (Left middle Kick)	1	
2019-07-21	Loss	(Japan) Tenshin Nasukawa	Rise World Series 2019 Semi Finals, -58 kg Tournament Semi Final	Tokyo, Japan	TKO (Doctor stop./Cut)	3	1:25
2019-06-01	Win	(Japan) Shota SaenchaiGym	The Battle Of Muay Thai Season II vol.2	Tokyo, Japan	KO (Right Cross)	2	0:22
2019-04-30	Loss	(Thailand) Phet Utong Or. Kwanmuang	Lumpinee Stadium	Bangkok, Thailand	Decision	5	3:00
2019-03-10	Win	(Brazil) Thalisson Gomes Ferreira	Rise World Series 2019 First Round, -58 kg Tournament Quarter Final	Tokyo, Japan	KO (Front kick to the body)	3	1:30
2019-02-01	Loss	(Thailand) Rungkit Morbeskamala	Lumpinee Stadium	Bangkok, Thailand	Decision	5	3:00
2018-12-26	Win	(Thailand) Rungkit Morbeskamala	Rajadamnern Stadium	Bangkok, Thailand	Decision	5	3:00
2018-11-17	Win	(Argentina) Ignacio Capllonch	RISE 129	Tokyo, Japan	Decision (Unanimous)	3	3:00
2018-11-09	Win	(Thailand) Yok Parunchai	Lumpinee Stadium	Bangkok, Thailand	KO (Punches)	3	
2018-09-07	Win	(Thailand) Teppabut Phetkiatphet	Lumpinee Stadium	Bangkok, Thailand	Decision	5	
Wins 130lbs Lumpinee title
2018-07-10	Win	(Thailand) Pataktep Sinbeemuaythai	Lumpinee Stadium	Bangkok, Thailand	KO (Punches)	5	
2018-06-05	Win	(Thailand) Mongkolpetch Petchyindee	Lumpinee Stadium	Bangkok, Thailand	Decision	5	
2018-03-28	Loss	(Thailand) Rodtang Jitmuangnon	WanParunchai + Poonseua Sanjorn	Nakhon Si Thammarat, Thailand	Decision	5	
2018-02-12	Loss	(Japan) Tenshin Nasukawa	KNOCK OUT First Impact	Tokyo, Japan	Decision	5	3:00
2018-01-09	Win	(Thailand) Nawapon Lukpakrit	Lumpinee Stadium	Bangkok, Thailand	KO (Left Elbow)	4	
2017-11-01	Win	(Thailand) Petchdam PetchyindeeAcademy	Rajadamnern Stadium	Bangkok, Thailand	Decision	5	3:00
2017-07-14	Win	(Thailand) Mongkolpetch Petchyindee	Ruamponkonsamui + Kiatpetch	Koh Samui, Thailand	KO (Left Hook)	4	
2017-06-09	Loss	(Thailand) Mongkolpetch Petchyindee	Lumpinee Stadium	Bangkok, Thailand	Decision	5	3:00
For the 130lbs Lumpinee title
2017-04-04	Win	(Thailand) Phetmorakot Teeded99	Lumpinee Stadium	Bangkok, Thailand	KO (Punches & elbow)	4	
Wins the 130lbs Lumpinee title
2016-09-30	Win	(Thailand) Chalam Parunchai	Lumpinee Stadium	Bangkok, Thailand	Decision	5	3:00
Wins Thailand 122lbs title
2016-07-08	Loss	(Thailand) Luknimit Singklongsi	Lumpinee Stadium	Bangkok, Thailand	Decision	5	3:00
2016-06-12	Win	(Thailand) Luknimit Singklongsi	Channel 7 Boxing Stadium	Bangkok, Thailand	Decision	5	3:00
2016-04-05	Win	(Thailand) Tingtong Kiatjaroenchai	Lumpinee Stadium	Bangkok, Thailand	Decision	5	3:00
2016-01-09	Loss	(Thailand) Jemsak Sakburiram	Lumpinee Stadium	Bangkok, Thailand	Decision	5	3:00
2015-11-21	Win	(Thailand) Sakulchai Veronafarm		Uthai Thani, Thailand	Decision	5	3:00
2015-10-30	Win	(Thailand) Mongkolchai Kwaitonggym	Lumpinee Stadium	Bangkok, Thailand	KO (Punches)	3	
2015-08-07	Win	(Thailand) Sakulchailek Por.Lakboon	Lumpinee Stadium	Bangkok, Thailand	Decision	5	3:00
2015-06-28	Loss	(Thailand) Mongkolchai Kwaitonggym	Channel 7 Boxing Stadium	Bangkok, Thailand	Decision	5	3:00
Loses Channel 7 Boxing Stadium 122lbs title
2015-05-12	Win	(Thailand) Kaotam Lookprabaht	Lumpinee Stadium	Bangkok, Thailand	Decision	5	3:00
2015-02-08	Win	(Thailand) Kongkiat Tor Pran 49	Channel 7 Boxing Stadium	Bangkok, Thailand	Decision	5	3:00
2014-12-21	Win	(Thailand) Choknumchai Sitjakong	Channel 7 Boxing Stadium	Bangkok, Thailand	Decision	5	3:00
Wins Channel 7 Boxing Stadium 122lbs title
2014-10-31	Loss	(Thailand) Panpayak Jitmuangnon	Lumpinee Stadium	Bangkok, Thailand	Decision	5	3:00
2014-10-07	Win	(Thailand) Chalongchai Sor.Rajabuth	Lumpinee Stadium	Bangkok, Thailand	Decision	5	3:00
2014-09-07	Win	(Thailand) Taladkek Sagsamrit	Channel 7 Boxing Stadium	Bangkok, Thailand	KO	4	
2014-08-08	Loss	(Thailand) Panpayak Jitmuangnon	Lumpinee Stadium	Bangkok, Thailand	Decision	5	3:00
Lost Lumpinee Stadium 118lbs title
2014-06-06	Win	(Thailand) Chalongchai Kiatcharoenchai	Lumpinee Stadium	Bangkok, Thailand	Decision	5	3:00
2014-05-02	Win	(Thailand) Chalamkao Kiatchalermpop	Lumpinee Stadium	Bangkok, Thailand	KO	3	
2014-04-08	Loss	(Thailand) Chalongchai Kiatcharoenchai	Lumpinee Stadium	Bangkok, Thailand	Decision	5	3:00
2013-11-08	Win	(Thailand) Sankeng Kelasport	Lumpinee Stadium	Bangkok, Thailand	Decision	5	3:00
2013-09-06	Win	(Thailand) Mondam Sor.Weerapon	Lumpinee Stadium	Bangkok, Thailand	Decision	5	3:00
Wins the vacant Lumpinee Stadium 118 lbs title
2013-08-05	Win	(Thailand) Chorfah Tor.Sangtiennoi	Lumpinee Stadium	Bangkok, Thailand	KO (Right Elbow)	4	
2013-07-09	Loss	(Thailand) Lamnampong Noomjeantawana	Lumpinee Stadium	Bangkok, Thailand	Decision	5	3:00
2013-06-04	Loss	(Thailand) Mongkolchai Kwaitonggym	Lumpinee Stadium	Bangkok, Thailand	Decision	5	3:00
2013-05-07	Win	(Thailand) Chokpreecha Kor.Sakuncha	Lumpinee Stadium	Bangkok, Thailand	Decision	5	3:00
2013-03-22	Win	(Thailand) Satanfah Eminentair	Lumpinee Stadium	Bangkok, Thailand	Decision	5	3:00
2013-02-05	Win	(Thailand) Muangthai PKSaenchaimuaythaigym	Lumpinee Stadium	Bangkok, Thailand	TKO (Punches)	3	
2012-11-04	Win	(Thailand) Kongkrai Kiatjaroenchai	Channel 7 Boxing Stadium	Bangkok, Thailand	Decision	5	3:00
2012-10-07	Win	(Thailand) Khaosanit Sor.Yingcharoenkarnchang	Channel 7 Boxing Stadium	Bangkok, Thailand	Decision	5	3:00
2012-08-25	Loss	(Thailand) Chingridthong Por.Worasing	Omnoi Boxing Stadium	Bangkok, Thailand	Decision	5	3:00
2012-07-15	Loss	(Thailand) Talatkhaek Saksamrit	Channel 7 Stadium	Bangkok, Thailand	Decision	5	3:00
2012-06-05	Win	(Thailand) Yothin SakaethongResort	Lumpinee Stadium	Bangkok, Thailand	Decision	5	3:00
2012-03-18	Loss	(Thailand) Jingridtong Por.Worasing	Channel 7 Stadium	Bangkok, Thailand	Decision	5	3:00
2011-10-11	Loss	(Thailand) Muangthai PKSaenchaimuaythaigym	Lumpinee Stadium	Bangkok, Thailand	Decision	5	3:00
2011-09-06	Loss	(Thailand) Muangthai PKSaenchaimuaythaigym	Lumpinee Stadium	Bangkok, Thailand	Decision	5	3:00
2011-07-22	Draw	(Thailand) Muangthai PKSaenchaimuaythaigym	Lumpinee Stadium	Bangkok, Thailand	Decision	5	3:00
2011-06-28	Loss	(Thailand) Muangthai PKSaenchaimuaythaigym	Lumpinee Stadium	Bangkok, Thailand	Decision	5	3:00
Legend: Win Loss Draw/No contest Notes

1. Suakim Sor.Jor.Tongprajin
