= Nattaphon Nacheukvittayakom =

Thai former professional Muay Thai fighter

- Born: Thailand
- Division: Super Bantamweight
- Style: Muay Thai (Muay Femur)
- Stance: Orthodox

Nattaphon Nacheukvittayakom (Thai: ณัฐพล นาเชือกวิทยาคม) is a Thai former professional Muay Thai fighter. He is a former Lumpinee Stadium Super Bantamweight Champion.

== Titles and accomplishments ==
- Lumpinee Stadium
  - 2014 Lumpinee Stadium Super Bantamweight (122 lbs) Champion
    - Five successful title defenses

== Fight record ==
Muay Thai Record
Date	Result	Opponent	Event	Location	Method	Round	Time
2018-08-10	Win	(Thailand) Kongfak Sitphuphadom		Thailand	Decision	5	3:00
2018-06-15	Loss	(Thailand) Tomas Sor.Chaijaroen		Thailand	Decision	5	3:00
2018-01-26	Loss	(Thailand) Saksit Tor.PaoPiamSapradriew	Rangsit Stadium	Rangsit, Thailand	Decision	5	3:00
2017-12-15	Win	(Thailand) Manasak Pinsinchai	Rangsit Stadium	Rangsit, Thailand	Decision	5	3:00
2017-09-08	Loss	(Thailand) Manasak Pinsinchai	Rangsit Stadium	Rangsit, Thailand	Decision	5	3:00
2017-08-09	Win	(Thailand) Praramkao 13 Leanresort	Sofia Hotel	Prachinburi Province, Thailand	Decision	5	3:00
2017-06-16	Win	(Thailand) Thepwalit RawaiMuaythai	Rangsit Stadium	Rangsit, Thailand	Decision	5	3:00
2017-03-24	Loss	(Thailand) Yod ET TEDED99	Rangsit Stadium	Rangsit, Thailand	Decision	5	3:00
2017-02-10	Win	(Thailand) Mahakan Sitpupandom	Rangsit Stadium	Rangsit, Thailand	Decision	5	3:00
2016-12-17	Win	(Thailand) Kwanphet Sor.Suwanpakdee		Thailand	Decision	5	3:00
2016-11-18	Loss	(Thailand) Yod ET TEDED99	Rangsit Stadium	Rangsit, Thailand	TKO	4	
2016-09-23	Win	(Thailand) Yodsenchai Sor.Sopit	Rangsit Stadium	Rangsit, Thailand	Decision	5	3:00
2016-08-26	Win	(Thailand) Thepwalit RawaiMuaythai	Rangsit Stadium	Rangsit, Thailand	Decision	5	3:00
2016-06-19	Loss	(Thailand) Saksit Tor.PaoPiamSapradriew	Rangsit Stadium	Rangsit, Thailand	Decision	5	3:00
2016-04-16	Win	(Thailand) Rungkit Wor.Sanprapai	Rangsit Stadium	Rangsit, Thailand	Decision	5	3:00
2016-03-20	Win	(Thailand) Thepnimit Sitmonchai	Rajadamnern Stadium	Bangkok, Thailand	Decision	5	3:00
2016-01-21	Loss	(Thailand) Khundiew Payabkhamphan	Rajadamnern Stadium	Bangkok, Thailand	Decision	5	3:00
2015-12-27	Win	(Japan) Itto Nakatake	BRAVE CORE	Hyōgo Prefecture, Japan	Decision	5	3:00
Defends the Lumpinee Stadium Super Bantamweight (122 lbs) title.
2015-10-06	Loss	(Thailand) Morakot Phetsimuen	Lumpinee Stadium	Bangkok, Thailand	Decision	5	3:00
2015-09-09	Win	(Thailand) Fasitong Sor.Jor.Piek-Uthai	Rajadamnern Stadium	Bangkok, Thailand	Decision	5	3:00
2015-08-12	Win	(Thailand) Kwanphet Sor.Suwanpakdee	Rajadamnern Stadium	Bangkok, Thailand	Decision	5	3:00
2015-07-19	Win	(Japan) Itto Nakatake	BRAVE CORE	Hyōgo Prefecture, Japan	Decision	5	3:00
Defends the Lumpinee Stadium Super Bantamweight (122 lbs) title.
2015-06-03	Win	(Thailand) Thelek Wor.Sangprapai	Rajadamnern Stadium	Bangkok, Thailand	Decision	5	3:00
2015-04-19	Win	(Japan) Sota Ichinohe	WPMF JAPAN×REBELS.35	Tokyo, Japan	Decision (Unanimous)	5	3:00
Defends the Lumpinee Stadium Super Bantamweight (122 lbs) title.
2015-01-22	Loss	(Thailand) Kwanphet Sor.Suwanpakdee	Rajadamnern Stadium	Bangkok, Thailand	Decision	5	3:00
2014-12-28	Win	(Japan) Itto Nakatake	BRAVE CORE	Hyōgo Prefecture, Japan	Decision (Unanimous)	5	3:00
Defends the Lumpinee Stadium Super Bantamweight (122 lbs) title.
2014-11-13	Win	(Thailand) Kongpop Thor.Pran49	Rajadamnern Stadium	Bangkok, Thailand	Decision	5	3:00
2014-10-12	Win	(Japan) Arashi Fujihara	Shuken 22	Tokyo, Japan	Decision (Unanimous)	5	3:00
Defends the Lumpinee Stadium Super Bantamweight (122 lbs) title.
2014-05-11	Win	(Japan) Itto Nakatake	BRAVE CORE	Hyōgo Prefecture, Japan	Decision (Unanimous)	5	3:00
Wins the vacant Lumpinee Stadium Super Bantamweight (122 lbs) title.
2013-12-22	Loss	(Japan) Itto Nakatake	BRAVE CORE	Hyōgo Prefecture, Japan	Decision (Unanimous)	5	3:00
2013-09-20	Win	(Thailand) Thepnimit Sitmonchai	Lumpinee Stadium	Bangkok, Thailand	Decision	5	3:00
2013-04-13	Loss	(Thailand) Jaosurenoi Pehtsuphaphan	Omnoi Stadium	Thailand	Decision	5	3:00
2010-11-14	Loss	(Thailand) Norasing Lukbanyai		Phimai District, Thailand	KO	1	
Legend: Win Loss Draw/No contest Notes
