= Thaksinlek Kiatniwat =

Muay Thai fighter

Taksinlek 168 Muay Thai
- Born: Thaksin Nadee; 17 June 1995 (age 31); Prachinburi province, Thailand
- Other names: Thaksinlek Sitprakayfa (ทักษิณเล็ก ศิษย์ประกายฟ้า); Thaksinlek SitAnoThai; Thaksinlek D.N.Muaythai; Thaksinlek Petchyindee; Thaksinlek Sor.Jor.Tongprachin; Taksinlek 168 Muay Thai
- Height: 175 cm (5 ft 9 in)
- Weight: 63 kg (139 lb; 9.9 st)
- Stance: Southpaw
- Fighting out of: Bangkok, Thailand

Thaksinlek Kiatniwat (ทักษิณเล็ก เกียรตินิวัฒน์) is a Muay Thai fighter and the former WMO Super Lightweight World Champion.

== Muay thai career ==
On 9 June 2017, Thaksinlek faced the former WMC and Channel 7 welterweight champion Littewada Sitthikul. Littewada won the fight by a third-round knockout.

Thaksinlek was scheduled to face Thanonchai Thanakorngym on 1 November 2020. He won the fight by decision.

Thansinlek was booked to face the former Channel 7 Boxing Stadium super lightweight champion Ferrari Fairtex on 13 December 2020. He lost the fight by decision.

On 21 March 2021, it was announced that Thaksinlek has signed with Petchyindee, as his previous camp was unable to arrange fights at his preferred weight.

Thaksinlek faced Kaonar P.K. Saenchai Muaythaigym at SuekMahakamMuayRuamPonKon Chana + Petchyindee on 8 April 2021, in his first fight after having signed with Petchyindee. He won the fight by decision.

Thaksinlek faced Rungkao Wor.Sanprapai at Muaymanwansuk on 22 October 2021. He won the fight by decision.

Thaksinlek faced the former Rajadamnern Stadium lightweight champion Rungkit Wor.Sanprapai at Muaymanwansuk on 12 November 2021. He lost the fight by decision.

Thaksinlek faced Rungkao Wor.Sanprapai for the vacant WMO World Lightweight title on 30 December 2021. He won the fight by decision.

Thaksinlek fought a rematch with Rungkit Wor.Sanprapai at the 17 February 2022 Petchyindee event. He won the fight by decision.

== Titles and accomplishments ==
- World Muay Thai Organization
  - 2021 WMO World Super Lightweight Champion
- Onesongchai
  - 2012 S-1 118 lbs Champion
- True4U Petchyindee
  - 2022 True4U 140 lbs Champion

== Fight record ==
Muay Thai record
Date	Result	Opponent	Event	Location	Method	Round	Time
2026-03-07	Win	(Australia) Reece Corrigan	Muay Thai Super Series	Perth, Australia	Decision (Unanimous)	3	3:00
2025-11-15	Win	(France) Damien Alamos	Road to Rajadamnern	Melbourne, Australia	KO (Left elbow)	1	2:52
2025-08-02	Win	(New Zealand) Ben Spears	Warriors Way 27	Melbourne, Australia	Decision (Unanimous)	3	3:00
2025-03-22	Win	(Cambodia) Sun Kun Khmer	Rebellion Muay Thai 33	Melbourne, Australia	KO (Head kick)	1	0:24
2023-07-02	Loss	(Thailand) PetchChaimet SorJor.TongPrachin	Muay Thai Rakya Su Withee Tin Thai	Hat Yai, Thailand	KO (Left cross)	3	0:16
2023-05-12	Loss	(Thailand) Kongklai AnnyMuayThai	Muay Thai Lumpinee Pitaktam	Songkhla province, Thailand	Decision	5	3:00
2023-04-08	Win	(Thailand) Rangkhao Wor.Sangprapai	Petchyindee + Rajadamnern World Series	Bangkok, Thailand	Decision (Unanimous)	3	3:00
2023-03-01	Win	(Thailand) Petchchaimek Sor.Jor.Tongprajin	CPF Muaymansananlok	Nakhon Sawan, Thailand	Decision (unanimous)	5	3:00
Defended the True4U Super Lightweight title.
2022-12-28	Loss	(Thailand) Capitan Petchyindee Academy	Muay Thai Rakya Soosakon + SAT Super Fight Withee Tin Thai + Petchyindee	Bangkok, Thailand	KO (Straight to the body)	3	1:18
2022-11-25	Win	(Thailand) Rungkit Wor.Sanprapai	Muaymanwansuk, Rangsit Stadium	Pathum Thani, Thailand	Decision	5	3:00
Wins the True4U 140 lbs title.
2022-09-06	Win	(Thailand) Ratchasing PetchyindeeAcademy	Muaymansananmuang, Rangsit Stadium	Pathum Thani, Thailand	Decision	5	3:00
2022-08-11	Loss	(Thailand) Rungkit Wor.Sanprapai	Petchyindee, Rajadamnern Stadium	Bangkok, Thailand	Decision	5	3:00
2022-05-13	Loss	(Thailand) Rangkhao Wor.Sangprapai	Muaymanwansuk, Rangsit Stadium	Pathum Thani, Thailand	KO (Elbow)	3	
2022-03-27	Draw	(Thailand) Rangkhao Wor.Sangprapai	MAX Muay Thai	Pattaya, Thailand	Decision	3	3:00
2022-02-17	Win	(Thailand) Rungkit Wor.Sanprapai	Petchyindee, Rajadamnern Stadium	Bangkok, Thailand	Decision	5	3:00
2021-12-30	Win	(Thailand) Rangkhao Wor.Sangprapai	Rangsit Stadium	Pathum Thani, Thailand	Decision	5	3:00
Wins the vacant WMO Super Lightweight World title
2021-11-12	Loss	(Thailand) Rungkit Wor.Sanprapai	Muaymanwansuk	Thailand	Decision	5	3:00
2021-10-22	Win	(Thailand) Rangkhao Wor.Sangprapai	Muaymanwansuk	Buriram province, Thailand	Decision	5	3:00
2021-04-08	Win	(Thailand) Kaonar P.K. Saenchai Muaythaigym	SuekMahakamMuayRuamPonKon Chana + Petchyindee	Songkhla province, Thailand	Decision	5	3:00
2020-12-13	Loss	(Thailand) Ferrari Fairtex	Channel 7 Stadium	Bangkok, Thailand	Decision	5	3:00
2020-11-01	Win	(Thailand) Thanonchai Thanakorngym	Channel 7 Stadium	Bangkok, Thailand	Decision	5	3:00
2020-07-22	Win	(Thailand) Siwakorn Kiatjaroenchai	Rajadamnern Stadium	Bangkok, Thailand	Decision	5	3:00
2020-01-10	Loss	(Thailand) Ferrari Jakrayanmuaythai	Rajadamnern Stadium	Bangkok, Thailand	Decision	5	3:00
2019-10-17	Loss	(Thailand) Thanonchai Thanakorngym	Rajadamnern Stadium	Bangkok, Thailand	KO (Left Straight)	4	
2019-05-16	Loss	(Thailand) Panpayak Sitchefboontham	Rajadamnern Stadium	Bangkok, Thailand	KO (Left Elbow)	4	
2019-04-11	Loss	(Thailand) Yodpanomrung Jitmuangnon	Rajadamnern Stadium	Bangkok, Thailand	Decision	5	3:00
2019-03-07	Loss	(Thailand) Yodpanomrung Jitmuangnon	Rajadamnern Stadium	Bangkok, Thailand	Decision	5	3:00
2019-01-02	Loss	(China) Lu Jun	Wu Lin Feng, -65 kg Tournament Quarter Finals	Hengqin, China	Decision	3	3:00
2018-12-06	Win	(Thailand) Komawut FA.Group	Rajadamnern Stadium	Bangkok, Thailand	KO	3	
2018-10-22	Loss	(Thailand) Panpayak Sitchefboontham	Rajadamnern Stadium	Bangkok, Thailand	KO (Left Elbow)	3	
2018-08-30	Win	(Thailand) Ratchasing Ror.Kelacorach	Rajadamnern Stadium	Bangkok, Thailand	Decision	5	3:00
2017-06-09	Loss	(Thailand) Littewada Sitthikul	Lumpinee Stadium	Bangkok, Thailand	KO	3	
2017-05-03	Win	(Thailand) Yodpanomrung Jitmuangnon	Rajadamnern Stadium	Bangkok, Thailand	Decision	5	3:00
2017-01-12	Win	(Thailand) Grandprixnoi Phetkiatphet	Rajadamnern Stadium	Bangkok, Thailand	Decision	5	3:00
2016-12-24	Win	(Thailand) Petpanomrung Kiatmuu9	Yodmuay Thairath TV	Bangkok, Thailand	Decision	5	3:00
2016-12-03	Win	(Thailand) Chalamphet Tor.Laksong		Thailand	Decision	5	3:00
2016-08-24	Win	(Thailand) Yok Parunchai	Rajadamnern Stadium	Thailand	Decision	5	3:00
2016-07-21	Loss	(Thailand) Muangthai PKSaenchaimuaythaigym	Rajadamnern Stadium	Bangkok, Thailand	KO (Left Elbow)	3	2:03
2016-05-22	Loss	(Thailand) Superbank Mor Ratanabandit	Rajadamnern Stadium	Bangkok, Thailand	Decision	5	3:00
2016-02-24	Loss	(Thailand) Saeksan Or. Kwanmuang	Rajadamnern Stadium	Bangkok, Thailand	Decision	5	3:00
2016-01-28	Win	(Thailand) Yokvittaya Phetsimean	Rajadamnern Stadium	Bangkok, Thailand	Decision	5	3:00
2015-12-23	Loss	(Thailand) Muangthai PKSaenchaimuaythaigym	Rajadamnern Birthday Show, Rajadamnern Stadium	Bangkok, Thailand	KO (Left Elbow)	3	1:10
2015-11-19	Win	(Thailand) Sangmanee Sor Tienpo	Onesongchai Fights, Rajadamnern Stadium	Bangkok, Thailand	Decision	5	3:00
2015-10-14	Win	(Thailand) Grandprixnoi Phithakpabhadang	Onesongchai Fights, Rajadamnern Stadium	Bangkok, Thailand	Decision	5	3:00
2015-09-19	Win	(Thailand) Phetboonchu Sor.Sommai		Thailand	KO	3	
2015-07-29	Loss	(Thailand) Rodlek Jaotalaytong	Rajadamnern Stadium	Bangkok, Thailand	Decision	5	3:00
2015-05-07	Loss	(Thailand) Phet Utong Or. Kwanmuang	Rajadamnern Stadium	Bangkok, Thailand	Decision	5	3:00
2015-03-30	Loss	(Thailand) Thanonchai Thanakorngym	Rajadamnern Stadium	Bangkok, Thailand	Decision	5	3:00
2015-02-12	Loss	(Thailand) Phet Utong Or. Kwanmuang	Rajadamnern Stadium	Bangkok, Thailand	KO (Left Hook)	4	
2015-01-08	Loss	(Thailand) Thanonchai Thanakorngym	Rajadamnern Stadium	Bangkok, Thailand	Decision	5	3:00
2014-12-09	Loss	(Thailand) Superbank Mor Ratanabandit	Lumpinee Stadium	Bangkok, Thailand	Decision	5	3:00
For 126 lbs Lumpinee title
2014-11-10	Draw	(Thailand) Superbank Mor Ratanabandit	Lumpinee Stadium	Bangkok, Thailand	Decision	5	3:00
2014-10-08	Loss	(Thailand) Superbank Mor Ratanabandit	Lumpinee Stadium	Bangkok, Thailand	Decision	5	3:00
2014-09-05	Loss	(Thailand) Superbank Mor Ratanabandit	Lumpinee Stadium	Bangkok, Thailand	Decision	5	3:00
For 126 lbs Lumpinee title
2014-08-14	Win	(Thailand) Sam-A Gaiyanghadao	Rajadamnern Stadium	Bangkok, Thailand	KO (head kick)	2	
2014-07-15	Win	(Thailand) Superlek Kiatmuu9	Lumpinee Stadium	Bangkok, Thailand	Decision	5	3:00
2014-06-02	Win	(Thailand) Sangmanee Sor Tienpo	Rajadamnern Stadium	Bangkok, Thailand	Decision	5	3:00
2014-05-07	Win	(Thailand) Sangmanee Sor Tienpo	Rajadamnern Stadium	Bangkok, Thailand	Decision	5	3:00
2014-01-14	Win	(Thailand) Denchiangkwan Lamtongkampat	Siam Omnoi Boxing Stadium	Bangkok, Thailand	Decision	5	3:00
2013-12-02	Loss	(Thailand) Luknimit Singklongsi	Lumpinee Stadium	Bangkok, Thailand	Decision	5	3:00
2013-11-06	Win	(Thailand) Naka Kaewsamrit	Rajadamnern Stadium	Bangkok, Thailand	Decision	5	3:00
2013-10-08	Loss	(Thailand) Lamnamoon Sakchaichote	Lumpinee Stadium	Bangkok, Thailand	Decision	5	3:00
2013-07-16	Loss	(Thailand) Saenkeng KILA-Sport	Lumpinee Stadium	Bangkok, Thailand	Decision	5	3:00
2012-11-05	Loss	(Thailand) Chankrit Ekbangzai	Rajadamnern Stadium	Bangkok, Thailand	Decision	5	3:00
2012-09-06	Win	(Thailand) Chokdee Por Telakul		Bangkok, Thailand	Decision	5	3:00
2012-07-02	Win	(Thailand) Tee-us Kor.Rachada	Rajadamnern Stadium	Bangkok, Thailand	Decision	5	3:00
2012-06-06	Loss	(Thailand) Pichitchai Or.Bor.Tor.Kampi	Rajadamnern Stadium	Bangkok, Thailand	Decision	5	3:00
2011-05-24	Win	(Thailand) Morakot Kor.Saphaothong	Petchpiya, Lumpinee Stadium	Bangkok, Thailand	KO	4	
2011-04-26	Win	(Thailand) Petsila Sor.Tumrungsi	Lumpinee Stadium	Bangkok, Thailand	Decision	5	3:00
2009-09-11	Win	(Thailand) Rittewada Sitthikul	Petchyindee, Lumpinee Stadium	Bangkok, Thailand	Decision	5	3:00
2009-05-12	Loss	(Thailand) Bangpleenoi 96 Peenang	Praianan, Lumpinee Stadium	Bangkok, Thailand	Decision	5	3:00
Legend: Win Loss Draw/No contest Notes
