= Phet-Utong Or.Kwanmuang =

Thai Muay Thai fighter

Phet Utong Or. Kwanmuang
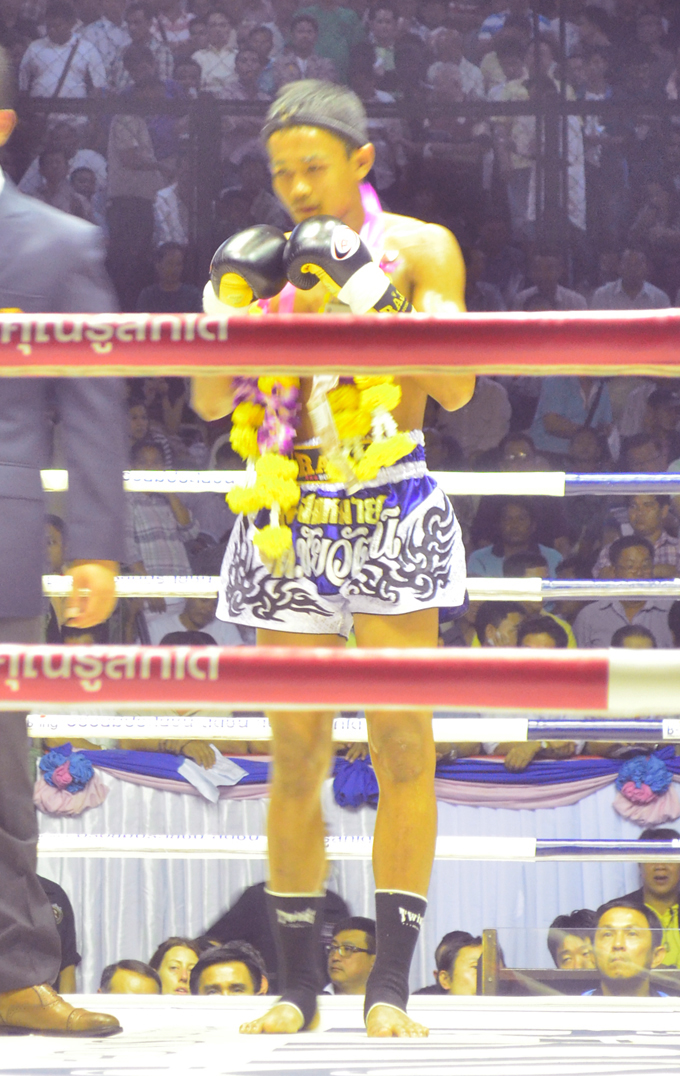
- Phet in 2012
- Born: Nattapon Nuankaew; 11 February 1995 (age 31); Buriram, Thailand
- Nickname: The Young Man from Buriram (Kwanmuang Jomclasik Buriram)
- Height: 172 cm (5 ft 8 in)
- Division: Super Featherweight; Lightweight; Welterweight
- Style: Muay Thai (Muay Femur)
- Stance: Orthodox
- Fighting out of: Bangkok, Thailand
- Team: Sor.Sommai Gym
- Years active: c. 2001-present

Kickboxing record
- Total: 242
- Wins: 160
- By knockout: 32
- Losses: 71
- Draws: 11

Other information
- Notable relatives: Fahsuchon Sit-O (uncle)

Nattapon Nuankaew (Thai: ณัฐพล นวลแก้ว; born 11 February 1995), known professionally as Phet Utong Or. Kwanmuang (Thai: เพชรอู่ทอง อ. ขวัญเมือง), is a Thai Muay Thai fighter. He is a former two-time Rajadamnern Stadium Super Featherweight Champion and the 2016 Sports Writers Association of Thailand Fighter of the Year.

== Biography and career ==
Phet Utong started training Muay Thai at the age of 6 at the Sor.Thaveekit camp owned by his father. He moved to Bangkok at the age of 14 and joined the Sor.Sommai Gym.

Phet Utong is a two-time Rajadamnern Stadium Super Featherweight champion, winning the first title against Superlek Kiatmuu9 in 2016 and the second time in 2017 against Kaonar P.K.SaenchaiMuaythaiGym.

In November 2018, Phet Utong Or. Kwanmuang was ranked the #9 Super-feather weight ranked on Rajadamnern Stadium by muaythai2000.com.

In December 2018, Phet Utong was ranked the #10 Super-feather weight on Lumpinee Stadium by muaythai2000.com.

In October 2019, Phet Utong was ranked the #8 Super-feather weight in Rajadamnern Stadium by muaythai2000.com. He was also ranked the #4 Super-feather weight in Lumpinee Stadium by muaythai2000.com.

== Titles and accomplishments ==
- Rajadamnern Stadium
  - 2016 Rajadamnern Stadium Super Featherweight (130 lbs) Champion
  - 2017 Rajadamnern Stadium Super Featherweight (130 lbs) Champion

Awards

- 2016 Sports Writers Association of Thailand Fighter of the Year

== Fight record ==
Muay Thai record
160 Wins, 75 Losses, 11 Draws
Date	Result	Opponent	Event	Location	Method	Round	Time
2024-02-26	Win	(Thailand) Petchklangna Sitphuyainiran		Sisaket province, Thailand	Decision	5	3:00
2023-10-04	Loss	(Thailand) Kanongsuek Gor.Kampanat	Muay Thai Palangmai, Rajadamnern Stadium	Bangkok, Thailand	KO (Low kicks)	2	
2023-09-01	Loss	(Uganda) Award Kazimba	Chaiyapahuyut Muaydee VitheeThai	Surat Thani province, Thailand	KO (Elbow)	1	
2023-07-30	Loss	(Thailand) Jaruadsuk Kiatnavy	Muaydee Vitheethai + Jitmuangnon, Or.Tor.Gor.3 Stadium	Nonthaburi, Thailand	Decision	5	3:00
2023-05-06	Win	(Turkey) Soner Sen	Rajadamnern World Series - Group Stage	Bangkok, Thailand	Decision (Unanimous)	3	3:00
2023-01-09	Loss	(Thailand) Superball Tded99	Muay Thai Pantamit	Chiang Rai province, Thailand	KO (Low kicks)	3	
2022-11-23	Win	(Thailand) Taksila Chor.Hapayak	Muay Thai Palangmai, Rajadamnern Stadium	Bangkok, Thailand	KO	3	
2022-09-23	Loss	(Brazil) Lobo PhuketFightClub	Muay Thai Lumpinee Pitaktam, Lumpinee Stadium	Bangkok, Thailand	KO (Elbow)	2	
2022-08-10	Loss	(Thailand) Sakunchailek ThePangkongprab	Muaythai Palangmai, Rajadamnern Stadium	Bangkok, Thailand	Decision	5	3:00
2022-07-06	Loss	(Thailand) Ferrari Fairtex	Muaythai Palangmai, Rajadamnern Stadium	Bangkok, Thailand	TKO (Referee stoppage)	4	
2022-06-01	Win	(Thailand) Patakthep Parkbangkhakhaw	Muay Thai Palangmai, Rajadamnern Stadium	Bangkok, Thailand	Decision	5	3:00
2022-05-04	Win	(Thailand) Prabsuek Siopol	Muay Thai Palangmai, Siam Omnoi Stadium	Samut Sakhon, Thailand	Decision	5	3:00
2022-03-11	Loss	(Thailand) Siwakorn Kiatcharoenchai	Pitaktham + Sor.Sommai + Palangmai	Songkhla province, Thailand	Decision	5	3:00
2022-01-23	Win	(Thailand) Rambolek Tor.Yotha	Channel 7 Stadium	Bangkok, Thailand	Decision	5	3:00
2021-11-06	Loss	(Thailand) Siwakorn Kiatcharoenchai	Omnoi Stadium	Samut Sakhon, Thailand	Decision	5	3:00
For the vacant Thailand Welterweight (147 lbs) title.
2021-09-25	Win	(Thailand) Thanonchai Fairtex	Kiatpetch, Lumpinee GoSport Studio	Bangkok, Thailand	Decision	5	3:00
2020-10-03	Loss	(Thailand) Superball Tded99	Omnoi Stadium	Samut Sakhon, Thailand	Decision	5	3:00
2020-02-28	Win	(Thailand) Rungkit Wor.Sanprapai	Ruamponkonchon Pratan Super Fight	Pathum Thani, Thailand	Decision	5	3:00
2019-12-23	Win	(Thailand) Panpayak Sitchefboontham	Rajadamnern Stadium	Bangkok, Thailand	Decision	5	3:00
2019-10-10	Win	(Thailand) Rangkhao Wor.Sangprapai	Rajadamnern Stadium	Bangkok, Thailand	Decision	5	3:00
2019-07-18	Loss	(Thailand) Mongkolpetch Petchyindee	Rajadamnern Stadium	Bangkok, Thailand	Decision	5	3:00
2019-05-29	Loss	(Thailand) Rungkit Wor.Sanprapai	Rajadamnern Stadium	Bangkok, Thailand	TKO (Low Kick)	3	
2019-04-30	Win	(Thailand) Suakim PK Saenchaimuaythaigym	Lumpinee Stadium	Bangkok, Thailand	Decision	5	3:00
2019-02-07	Loss	(Thailand) Superball Tded99	Rajadamnern Stadium	Bangkok, Thailand	Decision	5	3:00
2019-01-10	Loss	(Thailand) Jamsak Supermuay	Rajadamnern Stadium	Bangkok, Thailand	Decision	5	3:00
2018-12-21	Loss	(Thailand) Superball Tded99	Rajadamnern Stadium	Bangkok, Thailand	Decision	5	3:00
2018-11-29	Loss	(Thailand) Superball Tded99	Rajadamnern Stadium	Bangkok, Thailand	Decision	5	3:00
2018-11-09	Win	(France) Arthur Meyer	Best of Siam 14	France	Decision	3	3:00
2018-07-25	Win	(Thailand) Yamin P.K.SaenchaiMuaythaiGym	Rajadamnern Stadium	Bangkok, Thailand	KO (Right High Kick)	4	
2018-06-14	Draw	(Thailand) Superlek Kiatmuu9	Rajadamnern Stadium	Bangkok, Thailand	Decision	5	3:00
2018-03-22	Win	(Thailand) Extra Sitworrapat	Rajadamnern Stadium	Bangkok, Thailand	TKO (Referee Stop./Arm Injury)	4	
2018-02-20	Win	(Thailand) Phetwason Or.Daokrajai	Lumpinee Stadium	Bangkok, Thailand	Decision	5	3:00
2018-01-25	Loss	(Thailand) Superlek Kiatmuu9	Rajadamnern Stadium	Bangkok, Thailand	Decision	5	3:00
2017-12-21	Win	(Thailand) Kaonar P.K.SaenchaiMuaythaiGym	Rajadamnern Stadium	Bangkok, Thailand	Decision	5	3:00
Wins the vacant Rajadamnern Stadium Super Featherweight (130 lbs) title.
2017-09-09	Win	(Thailand) Nuenglanlek Jitmuangnon		Thailand	TKO	4	
2017-08-07	Win	(Thailand) Theppabuth Sit-Au-Ubon	Rajadamnern Stadium	Bangkok, Thailand	Decision	5	3:00
2017-06-28	Loss	(Thailand) Kaonar P.K.SaenchaiMuaythaiGym	Rajadamnern Stadium	Bangkok, Thailand	Decision	5	3:00
2017-05-25	Loss	(Thailand) Panpayak Sitjatik	Rajadamnern Stadium	Bangkok, Thailand	KO (Left Elbow)	3	
2017-04-06	Loss	(Thailand) Panpayak Jitmuangnon	Rajadamnern Stadium	Bangkok, Thailand	Decision	5	3:00
2017-03-02	Win	(Thailand) Panpayak Jitmuangnon	Rajadamnern Stadium	Bangkok, Thailand	TKO (Referee Stoppage/Right Hook)	1	
2017-02-02	Win	(Thailand) Kaimukkao Por.Thairongruangkamai	Rajadamnern Stadium	Bangkok, Thailand	KO ( Right Elbow)	2	
2016-12-22	Win	(Thailand) Superlek Kiatmuu9	Rajadamnern Stadium	Bangkok, Thailand	Decision	5	3:00
Wins the Rajadamnern Stadium Super Featherweight (130 lbs) title.
2016-09-29	Win	(Thailand) Kaewkungwan Piwwayo	Rajadamnern Stadium	Bangkok, Thailand	Decision	5	3:00
2016-07-18	Win	(Thailand) Bangpleenoi 96Penang	Rajadamnern Stadium	Bangkok, Thailand	Decision	5	3:00
2016-04-29	Win	(Thailand) Saen Parunchai	Lumpinee Stadium	Bangkok, Thailand	KO (Right Uppercut)	3	
2016-03-10	Win	(Thailand) Panpayak Sitjatik	Rajadamnern Stadium	Bangkok, Thailand	Decision	5	3:00
2016-01-29	Loss	(Thailand) Panpayak Sitjatik	Rajadamnern Stadium	Bangkok, Thailand	Decision	5	3:00
2015-11-19	Loss	(Thailand) Thanonchai Thanakorngym	Rajadamnern Stadium	Bangkok, Thailand	KO (Left Cross)	3	
2015-10-14	Loss	(Thailand) Muangthai PKSaenchaimuaythaigym	Onesongchai Anniversary Show, Rajadamnern Stadium	Bangkok, Thailand	KO (Right Upper Elbow)	3	2:18
2015-09-10	Loss	(Thailand) Thanonchai Thanakorngym	Rajadamnern Stadium	Bangkok, Thailand	Decision	5	3:00
2015-07-15	Win	(Thailand) Superlek Kiatmuu9	Rajadamnern Stadium	Bangkok, Thailand	Decision	5	3:00
2015-06-04	Loss	(Thailand) Sangmanee Sor Tienpo	Rajadamnern Stadium	Bangkok, Thailand	Decision	5	3:00
2015-05-07	Win	(Thailand) Thaksinlek Kiatniwat	Rajadamnern Stadium	Bangkok, Thailand	Decision	5	3:00
2015-03-30	Loss	(Thailand) Sangmanee Sor Tienpo	Rajadamnern Stadium	Bangkok, Thailand	Decision	5	3:00
2015-02-12	Win	(Thailand) Thaksinlek Kiatniwat	Rajadamnern Stadium	Bangkok, Thailand	KO (Left Hook)	4	
2014-12-24	Win	(Thailand) Yokwithaya Petchsimuan	Rajadamnern Stadium	Bangkok, Thailand	Decision	5	3:00
2014-11-25	Loss	(Thailand) Kwankhao Mor.Ratanabandit	Lumpinee Stadium	Bangkok, Thailand	Decision	5	3:00
2014-10-28	Win	(Thailand) Superlek Kiatmuu9	Lumpinee Stadium	Bangkok, Thailand	TKO (Doctor Stoppage/Cut)	4	1:49
2014-10-08	Win	(Thailand) Singtongnoi Por.Telakun	Rajadamnern Stadium	Bangkok, Thailand	TKO	3	
2014-05-02	Loss	(Thailand) Songkom Sakhomsin	Lumpinee Stadium	Bangkok, Thailand	Decision	5	3:00
2013-10-29	Loss	(Thailand) Phetmorakot Petchyindee Academy	Lumpinee Stadium	Bangkok, Thailand	Decision	5	3:00
2013-09-11	Win	(Thailand) Superbank Mor Ratanabandit	Rajadamnern Stadium	Bangkok, Thailand	Decision	5	3:00
2013-08-15	Win	(Thailand) Nongbeer Chokngamwong	Lumpinee Stadium	Bangkok, Thailand	Decision	5	3:00
2013-07-12	Win	(Thailand) Nongbeer Chokngamwong	Lumpinee Stadium	Bangkok, Thailand	Decision	5	3:00
2013-06-07	Loss	(Thailand) Sam-A Kaiyanghadaogym	Lumpinee Stadium	Bangkok, Thailand	TKO (Low kick)	2	
2013-05-17	Win	(Thailand) Nongbeer Chokngamwong	Lumpinee Stadium	Bangkok, Thailand	Decision	5	3:00
2013-04-09	Loss	(Thailand) Sam-A Kaiyanghadaogym	Lumpinee Stadium	Bangkok, Thailand	Decision	5	3:00
2013-03-07	Win	(Thailand) Phetmorakot Petchyindee Academy	Rajadamnern Stadium	Bangkok, Thailand	Decision	5	3:00
2013-02-05	Win	(Thailand) Mongkolchai Kwaitonggym	Lumpinee Stadium	Bangkok, Thailand	Decision	5	3:00
2012-12-24	Loss	(Thailand) Kaotam Lookprabaht	Lumpinee Stadium	Bangkok, Thailand	Decision	5	3:00
2012-10-11	Draw	(Thailand) Yodtongthai Por.Telakoon	Rajadamnern Stadium	Bangkok, Thailand	Decision	5	3:00
2012-09-18	Win	(Thailand) Luknimit Singklongsi	Lumpinee Stadium	Bangkok, Thailand	Decision	5	3:00
2012-08-08	Win	(Thailand) Auisiewpor Sujibamikiew	Rajadamnern Stadium	Bangkok, Thailand	Decision	5	3:00
2012-07-17	Win	(Thailand) Tiankhao Tor.Sangtiennoi	Lumpinee Stadium	Bangkok, Thailand	Decision	5	3:00
2012-05-17	Loss	(Thailand) Dang Sor.Ploenjit	Rajadamnern Stadium	Bangkok, Thailand	Decision	5	3:00
2011-11-08	Loss	(Thailand) Dang Sor.Ploenjit	Khunsuk Trakunyang, Lumpinee Stadium	Bangkok, Thailand	Decision	5	3:00
Legend: Win Loss Draw/No contest Notes
