= Superbank Mor Ratanabandit =

Thai former professional Muay Thai fighter

Superbank Mor.Ratanabandit
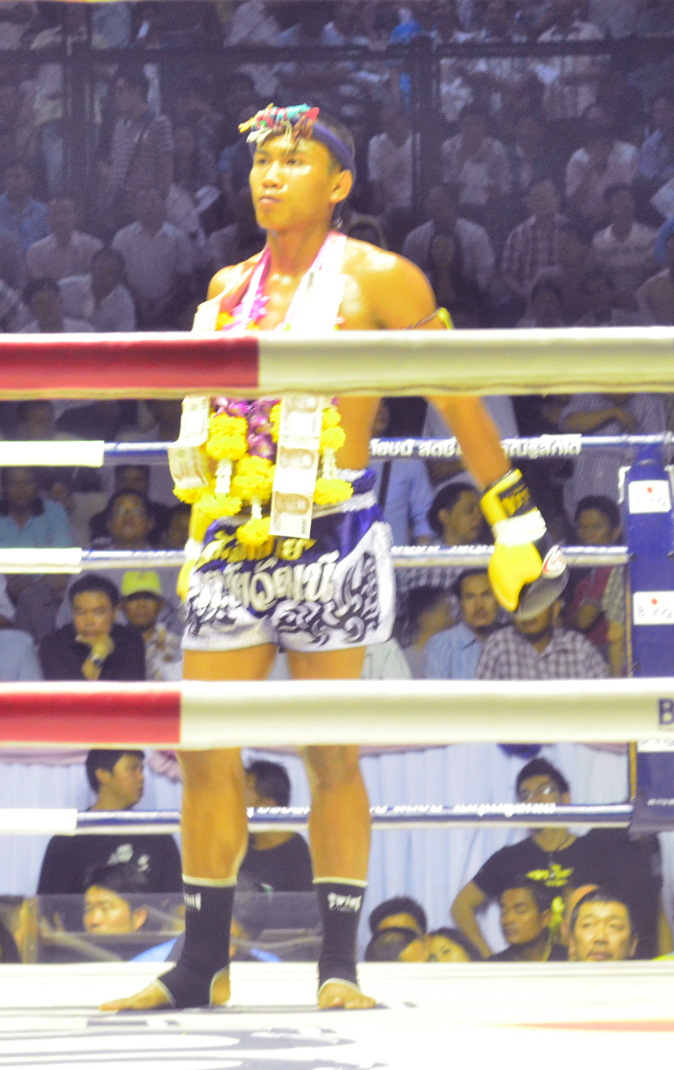
- Superbank in 2012
- Born: Padchaya Nongchin; August 20, 1994 (age 32); Bangkok, Thailand
- Native name: ปชัญญะ หลงชิน
- Other names: Superbank Sakchaichote
- Height: 168 cm (5 ft 6 in)
- Division: Mini Flyweight; Super Flyweight; Featherweight; Lightweight
- Style: Muay Thai (Muay Femur)
- Stance: Southpaw
- Years active: c. 2003–2020

Kickboxing record
- Total: 179
- Wins: 126
- By knockout: 20
- Losses: 46
- Draws: 7

Other information
- Occupation: Muay Thai fighter (retired)

Padchaya Nongchin (Thai: ปชัญญะ หลงชิน; born August 20, 1994), known professionally as Superbank Mor.Ratanabandit (Thai: ซุปเปอร์แบงค์ ม.รัตนบัณฑิต), is a Thai former professional Muay Thai fighter. He is a former one-time Lumpinee Stadium champion and a two-time Rajadamnern Stadium champion across three divisions.

== Biography ==
Superbank started training in Muay Thai at the age of 9 with his father.

== Titles and accomplishments ==
- Rajadamnern Stadium
  - 2010 Rajadamnern Stadium Mini Flyweight (105 lbs) Champion
  - 2010 Rajadamnern Stadium Rising Fighter of the Year
  - 2011 Rajadamnern Stadium Super Flyweight (115 lbs) Champion
  - 2014 Rajadamnern Stadium Fighter of the Year
- Lumpinee Stadium
  - 2013 Lumpinee Stadium Featherweight (126 lbs) Champion
    - Four successful title defenses
  - 2014 Lumpinee Stadium Fighter of the Year

Awards

- 2013 Sports Authority of Thailand Fighter of the Year Runner-up
- 2014 Sports Authority of Thailand Fighter of the Year
- 2014 Siam Sport Fighter of the Year

== Fight record ==
Muay Thai record
| Date | Result | Opponent | Event | Location | Method | Round | Time |
|---|---|---|---|---|---|---|---|
| 2020-02-18 | Loss | (Thailand) Fonpanlan PKsaenchaimuaythaigym | Lumpinee Stadium | Bangkok, Thailand | Decision | 5 | 3:00 |
| 2019-11-30 | Loss | (Thailand) Khumsap SuwitGym | MTGP32 | Perth, Australia | Decision | 5 | 3:00 |
For the ISKA Muay Thai Lightweight (135 lbs) World title.
| 2019-05-25 | Win | (Australia) Zac Einersen | Yokkao 40 | Sydney, Australia | Decision | 5 | 3:00 |
| 2019-03-29 | Win | (United Kingdom) Paul Karpowicz | Yokkao 37 & 38 | United Kingdom | Decision | 5 | 3:00 |
| 2019-03-09 | Win | (Ukraine) Igor Liubchenko | All Star Fight | Bangkok, Thailand | Decision | 5 | 3:00 |
| 2019-02-14 | Loss | (Thailand) Mongkolkaew Sor.Sommai | Rajadamnern Stadium | Bangkok, Thailand | Decision | 5 | 3:00 |
| 2018-10-18 | Draw | (Thailand) Phetwason Or.Daokrajai | Rajadamnern Stadium | Bangkok, Thailand | Decision | 5 | 3:00 |
| 2018-09-06 | Win | (Thailand) Sirimongkol PKSaenchai | Rajadamnern Stadium | Bangkok, Thailand | Decision | 5 | 3:00 |
| 2018-08-07 | Loss | (Thailand) Rodtang Jitmuangnon | | Songkhla, Thailand | Decision | 5 | 3:00 |
| 2018-05-24 | Win | (Thailand) Mongkolkaew Sor Sommai | Rajadamnern Stadium | Bangkok, Thailand | Decision | 5 | 3:00 |
| 2018-05-03 | Win | (France) Brandon Vieira | MFC 7 | France | Decision | 5 | 3:00 |
| 2018-02-26 | Loss | (Thailand) Kaonar P.K.SaenchaiMuaythaiGym | Phoenix 5 Bangkok | Bangkok, Thailand | Decision | 5 | 3:00 |
| 2018-01-25 | Win | (Thailand) Mongkolkaew Sor.Sommai | Rajadamnern Stadium | Bangkok, Thailand | Decision | 5 | 3:00 |
| 2018-01-06 | Win | (France) Arthur Meyer | Rajadamnern Stadium | Paris, France | Decision | 5 | 3:00 |
| 2017-11-15 | Loss | (Thailand) Phetwason Or.Daokrajai | Rajadamnern Stadium | Bangkok, Thailand | Decision | 5 | 3:00 |
| 2017-09-11 | Loss | (Thailand) Kaonar P.K.SaenchaiMuaythaiGym | Rajadamnern Stadium | Bangkok, Thailand | Decision | 5 | 3:00 |
| 2017-07-27 | Draw | (Thailand) Kaonar P.K.SaenchaiMuaythaiGym | Rajadamnern Stadium | Bangkok, Thailand | Decision | 5 | 3:00 |
| 2017-05-03 | Loss | (Thailand) Saeksan Or. Kwanmuang | Rajadamnern Stadium | Bangkok, Thailand | Decision | 5 | 3:00 |
| 2017-02-22 | Win | (Thailand) Petnamngam Or.Kwanmuang | Rajadamnern Stadium | Bangkok, Thailand | Decision | 5 | 3:00 |
| 2017-01-26 | Draw | (Thailand) Saeksan Or. Kwanmuang | Rajadamnern Stadium | Bangkok, Thailand | Decision | 5 | 3:00 |
| 2016-12-21 | Win | (Thailand) Petlamsin Sor.Kor.Sungaigym | Rajadamnern Stadium | Bangkok, Thailand | Decision | 5 | 3:00 |
| 2016-09-14 | Loss | (Thailand) Panpayak Jitmuangnon | Rajadamnern Stadium | Bangkok, Thailand | Decision | 5 | 3:00 |
| 2016-08-03 | Win | (Thailand) Fonluang Sitboonmee | Rajadamnern Stadium | Bangkok, Thailand | Decision | 5 | 3:00 |
| 2016-05-22 | Win | (Thailand) Thaksinlek Kiatniwat | Rajadamnern Stadium | Bangkok, Thailand | Decision | 5 | 3:00 |
| 2015-01-08 | Win | (Thailand) Muangthai PKSaenchaimuaythaigym | Lumpinee Stadium | Bangkok, Thailand | Decision | 5 | 3:00 |
| 2014-12-09 | Win | (Thailand) Thaksinlek Kiatniwat | Lumpinee Stadium | Bangkok, Thailand | Decision | 5 | 3:00 |
Defends the Lumpinee Stadium Featherweight (126 lbs) title.
| 2014-11-10 | Draw | (Thailand) Thaksinlek Kiatniwat | Lumpinee Stadium | Bangkok, Thailand | Decision | 5 | 3:00 |
| 2014-10-08 | Win | (Thailand) Thaksinlek Kiatniwat | Lumpinee Stadium | Bangkok, Thailand | Decision | 5 | 3:00 |
| 2014-09-05 | Win | (Thailand) Thaksinlek Kiatniwat | Lumpinee Stadium | Bangkok, Thailand | Decision | 5 | 3:00 |
| 2014-08-14 | Win | (Thailand) Pettawee Sor Kittichai | Rajadamnern Stadium | Bangkok, Thailand | Decision | 5 | 3:00 |
| 2014-07-16 | Win | (Thailand) Pettawee Sor Kittichai | Rajadamnern Stadium | Bangkok, Thailand | Decision | 5 | 3:00 |
| 2014-06-12 | Draw | (Thailand) Saeksan Or. Kwanmuang | Rajadamnern Stadium | Bangkok, Thailand | Decision | 5 | 3:00 |
| 2014-05-06 | Win | (Thailand) Superlek Kiatmuu9 | Lumpinee Stadium | Bangkok, Thailand | Decision | 5 | 3:00 |
Defends the Lumpinee Stadium Featherweight (126 lbs) title.
| 2014-03-30 | Loss | (Thailand) Superlek Kiatmuu9 | | Songkla, Thailand | Decision | 5 | 3:00 |
| 2014-02-28 | Loss | (Thailand) Sangmanee Sor Tienpo | Lumpinee Stadium | Bangkok, Thailand | Decision | 5 | 3:00 |
| 2014-02-28 | Win | (Thailand) Sam-A Gaiyanghadao | Lumpinee Stadium | Bangkok, Thailand | Decision | 5 | 3:00 |
| 2013-12-03 | Win | (Thailand) Sam-A Gaiyanghadao | Lumpinee Stadium | Bangkok, Thailand | Decision | 5 | 3:00 |
Defends the Lumpinee Stadium Featherweight (126 lbs) title.
| 2013-11-06 | Win | (Thailand) Sangmanee Sor Tienpo | Rajadamnern Stadium | Bangkok, Thailand | Decision | 5 | 3:00 |
| 2013-10-08 | Win | (Thailand) Thanonchai Thanakorngym | Lumpinee Stadium | Bangkok, Thailand | Decision | 5 | 3:00 |
Defends the Lumpinee Stadium Featherweight (126 lbs) title.
| 2013-09-11 | Loss | (Thailand) Phet Utong Or. Kwanmuang | Rajadamnern Stadium | Bangkok, Thailand | Decision | 5 | 3:00 |
| 2013-08-05 | Draw | (Thailand) Singtongnoi Por.Telakun | Rajadamnern Stadium | Bangkok, Thailand | Decision | 5 | 3:00 |
| 2013-07-09 | Win | (Thailand) Penake Sitnumnoi | Lumpinee Stadium | Bangkok, Thailand | Decision | 5 | 3:00 |
Wins the Lumpinee Stadium Featherweight (126 lbs) title.
| 2013-06-03 | Win | (Thailand) Singtongnoi Por.Telakun | Lumpinee Stadium | Bangkok, Thailand | Decision | 5 | 3:00 |
| 2013-04-05 | Win | (Thailand) Rittidej Wor.Wanthavi | Lumpinee Stadium | Bangkok, Thailand | Decision | 5 | 3:00 |
| 2012-12-24 | Win | (Thailand) Rittidej Wor.Wanthavi | Rajadamnern Stadium | Bangkok, Thailand | Decision | 5 | 3:00 |
| 2012-11-09 | Loss | (Thailand) Nongbeer Chokngamwong | Lumpinee Stadium | Bangkok, Thailand | KO | 1 | |
| 2012-09-28 | Win | (Thailand) Newwangjan Pagonponsurin | Lumpinee Stadium | Bangkok, Thailand | KO | 2 | |
| 2012-06-28 | Draw | (Thailand) Yodthongthai Por Telakun | Rajadamnern Stadium | Bangkok, Thailand | Decision | 5 | 3:00 |
| 2012-06-06 | Win | (Thailand) Nongbeer Chokngamwong | Rajadamnern Stadium | Bangkok, Thailand | Decision | 5 | 3:00 |
| 2012-05-01 | Win | (Thailand) Kaotam Lookprabaht | | Bangkok, Thailand | Decision | 5 | 3:00 |
| 2012-01-20 | Win | (Thailand) Rungrat Tor.Pitakgollakan | Lumpinee Stadium | Bangkok, Thailand | Decision | 5 | 3:00 |
| 2011-10-20 | Loss | (Thailand) Farsawang Tor Sangtiennoi | Rajadamnern Stadium | Bangkok, Thailand | Decision | 5 | 3:00 |
| 2011-08-18 | Win | (Thailand) Yodthongthai Por Telakun | Rajadamnern Stadium | Bangkok, Thailand | Decision | 5 | 3:00 |
Wins the Rajadamnern Stadium Super Flyweight (115 lbs) title.
| 2011-03-15 | Loss | (Thailand) Luknimit Singklongsi | Lumpinee Stadium | Bangkok, Thailand | Decision | 5 | 3:00 |
| 2011-02-10 | Win | (Thailand) Thaveesak Singklongsi | | Bangkok, Thailand | Decision | 5 | 3:00 |
| 2011-01-20 | Win | (Thailand) Tiankao Tor.Sangtiennoi | | Bangkok, Thailand | Decision | 5 | 3:00 |
| 2010-12-23 | Win | (Thailand) Tawanrung Ersampan | | Bangkok, Thailand | Decision | 5 | 3:00 |
| 2010-10-21 | Win | (Thailand) Prajanchai Por.Phetnamtong | Rajadamnern Stadium | Bangkok, Thailand | Decision | 5 | 3:00 |
Wins side-bet of 800,000 baht.
| 2010-09-15 | Win | (Thailand) Prajanchai Por.Phetnamtong | Rajadamnern Stadium | Bangkok, Thailand | Decision | 5 | 3:00 |
Wins the Rajadamnern Stadium Mini Flyweight (105 lbs) title.
| 2010-08-27 | Loss | (Thailand) Yodtongthai Por.Telakun | Lumpinee Stadium | Bangkok, Thailand | Decision | 5 | 3:00 |
| 2010-05-13 | Win | (Thailand) Excindicongym | Rajadamnern Stadium | Bangkok, Thailand | Decision | 5 | 3:00 |
| 2010-03-25 | Win | (Thailand) Prabpram Tor.Chuchip | Rajadamnern Stadium | Bangkok, Thailand | Decision | 5 | 3:00 |
| 2010-01-14 | Loss | (Thailand) Prajanchai Por.Phetnamtong | Rajadamnern Stadium | Bangkok, Thailand | Decision | 5 | 3:00 |
| 2009-10-14 | Win | (Thailand) Dang Sor.Ploenjit | Rajadamnern Stadium | Bangkok, Thailand | Decision | 5 | 3:00 |
| 2009-09-10 | Win | (Thailand) Kan Nampatahoimook | Rajadamnern Stadium | Bangkok, Thailand | Decision | 5 | 3:00 |
| 2009-08-06 | Loss | (Thailand) Dung Sor.Ploenjit | Rajadamnern Stadium | Thailand | Decision | 5 | 3:00 |
| 2009-05-01 | Win | (Thailand) Meknoi Sor.Danchai | Rajadamnern Stadium | Thailand | Decision | 5 | 3:00 |
| 2008-10-13 | Win | (Thailand) Tongsak Jarernkasem | Rajadamnern Stadium | Bangkok, Thailand | Decision | 5 | 3:00 |
| 2008-07-14 | Loss | (Thailand) Decha Kiatpatpan | Rajadamnern Stadium | Bangkok, Thailand | Decision | 5 | 3:00 |
Legend: Win Loss Draw/No contest Notes
