= Thanonchai Thanakorngym =

Muay Thai fighter

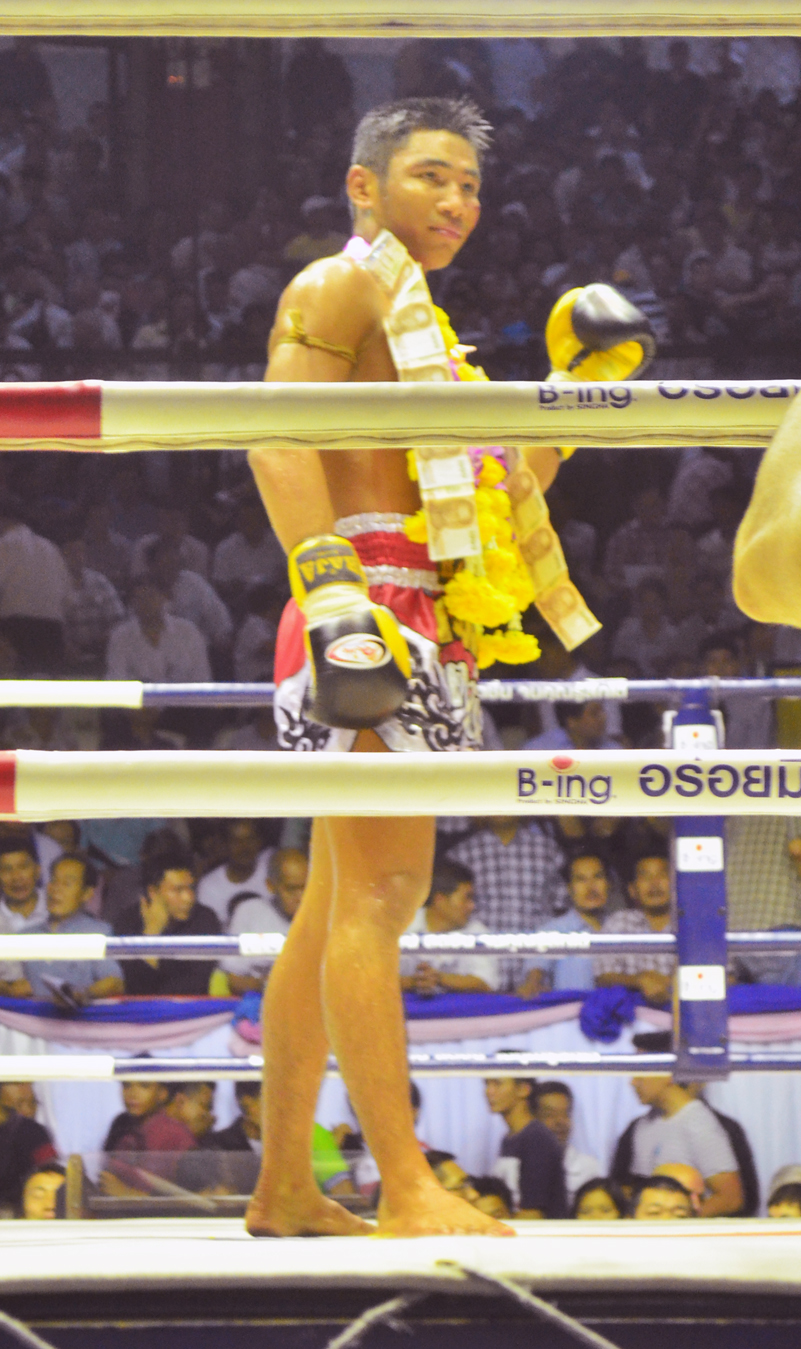
- Thanonchai Tor Sangtiennoi
- Born: Jomnong Jampatong; July 2, 1993 (age 33); Satuek District, Thailand
- Other names: Thanonchai Fairtex (ธนญชัย แฟร์เท็กซ์); Thanonchai Tor Sangtiennoi (ธนญชัย ท.แสงเทียนน้อย); Thanonchai Somwanggaiyang; Hong Thanonchai
- Height: 170 cm (5 ft 7 in)
- Weight: 61 kg (134 lb; 9.6 st)
- Style: Muay Thai (Muay Maat)
- Stance: Southpaw
- Fighting out of: Bangkok, Thailand

Kickboxing record
- Total: 155
- Wins: 99
- Losses: 48
- Draws: 8

Thanonchai Thanakorngym (ธนญชัย ธนกรยิมส์) is a retired Thai Muay Thai fighter.

== Biography ==
Thanonchai started training in Muay Thai with his father at 12 years old. He then went to train with the legend Sangtiennoi Sor Rungroj at his gym and fought under the name Thanonchai Tor.Sangtiennoi.

In 2015 Thanonchai changed gym to go train with Samart Payakaroon and fought under the name Thanonchai Thanakorngym.

Thanonchai is a fan favorite of the stadiums because of his aggressive style and relentless pressure, which he displayed 9 times against his rival Sangmanee Sor Tienpo. Some of these fights have been noted being particularly brutal and are considered the best of their year.

His fights against Saeksan Or. Kwanmuang are also remembered by fans as highlights of the year in Muay Thai.

As of February 2016, he was ranked #1 in Rajadamnern Stadium at Super Featherweight according to Muaythai2000.

In late 2016 Thanonchai underwent knee surgery and spent 8 months in rehabilitation. He made his comeback on the international scene fighting under kickboxing rules mainly in China.

Thanonchai made his return to Muay thai in March 2019 after signing with a new sponsor, now fighting under the name Thanonchai Somwanggaiyang. In France at the Emperor Chok Dee event he won his fight by decision.

He also became a boxing trainer during his time outside Muay Thai competition in Hong Kong, and announced that he would come back to muay thai in Thailand in 2019.

== Titles and accomplishments ==
- Rajadamnern Stadium
  - 2015 Rajadamnern Stadium Fight of the Year (vs Saeksan Or. Kwanmuang on February 12)
  - 2016 Rajadamnern Stadium Fight of the Year (vs Sangmanee Sor Tienpo)
- Awards
  - 2015 Siam Sport Fighter of the Year

== Fight record ==
Kickboxing record
100 Wins, 52 Losses, 8 Draws
Date	Result	Opponent	Event	Location	Method	Round	Time
2025-05-14	Loss	(Thailand) Simanut	Golden Dragon Fight Night, Petchbuncha Stadium	Koh Samui, Thailand	KO (Elbow)	2	
2024-11-16	Loss	(France) Bryan Lang	Ultimate 7	Strasbourg, France	Decision	3	3:00
2024-10-12	Win	(France) Yassine Hamlaoui	Lion Belt 2024	Belfort, France	KO (Left cross)	3	1:42
2022-09-17	Loss	(Thailand) Batman Or.Atchariya	Ruamponkon Samui + Kiatpetch Samui Fight, Petchbuncha Stadium	Koh Samui, Thailand	TKO (Doctor stoppage)	4	
2022-08-27	Win	(Thailand) Darky NokKhao GorMor11	Ruamponkon Samui + Kiatpetch Samui Fight, Petchbuncha Stadium	Koh Samui, Thailand	Decision	5	3:00
2022-05-21	Win	(Australia) Albert Xavier	Fairtex Fight, Lumpinee Stadium	Bangkok, Thailand	KO	1	
2022-04-17	Loss	(Thailand) Yok Parunchai	Channel 7 Stadium	Bangkok, Thailand	Decision	5	3:00
2022-03-13	Loss	(Thailand) Rambolek Tor.Yotha	Channel 7 Stadium	Bangkok, Thailand	Decision	5	3:00
2021-11-26	Win	(Thailand) Saeksan Or. Kwanmuang	Muay Thai Moradok Kon Thai + Rajadamnern Super Fight	Buriram, Thailand	Decision	5	3:00
2021-09-25	Loss	(Thailand) PhetUtong Or.Kwanmuang	Kiatpetch, Lumpinee GoSport Studio	Bangkok, Thailand	Decision	5	3:00
2021-03-07	Loss	(Thailand) Nuathoranee Samchaivisetsuk	Channel 7 Stadium	Bangkok, Thailand	Decision	5	3:00
For the vacant Channel 7 Stadium 135lbs title.
2020-12-08	Loss	(Thailand) Siwakorn kiatjaroenchai	Lumpinee Birthday Show, Lumpinee Stadium	Bangkok, Thailand	Decision	5	3:00
2020-11-01	Loss	(Thailand) Thaksinlek Kiatniwat	Channel 7 Stadium	Bangkok, Thailand	Decision	5	3:00
2020-07-18	Loss	(Thailand) Saeksan Or. Kwanmuang	Siam Omnoi Stadium	Samut Sakhon, Thailand	Decision	5	3:00
For the vacant Siam Omnoi Stadium 140lbs title.
2020-03-05	Loss	(Thailand) Saeksan Or. Kwanmuang	Rajadamnern Stadium	Bangkok, Thailand	KO (Right Elbow)	3	
For the vacant Rajadamnern Stadium 135lbs title.
2020-01-31	Loss	(Thailand) Saeksan Or. Kwanmuang	Phuket Super Fight Real Muay Thai	Mueang Phuket District, Thailand	Decision	5	3:00
2020-01-08	Win	(Thailand) Gingsanglek Tor.Laksong	Rajadamnern Stadium	Bangkok, Thailand	KO (Left Straight)	3	
2019-12-12	Win	(Thailand) Apiwat Sor.Somnuek	Rajadamnern Stadium	Bangkok, Thailand	Decision	5	3:00
2019-10-17	Win	(Thailand) Thaksinlek Kiatniwat	Rajadamnern Stadium	Bangkok, Thailand	KO (Left Straight)	4	
2019-09-15	Win	(China) Liu Moudon	Muay Thai Super Champ	Bangkok, Thailand	KO (Left Elbow)	2	
2019-07-22	Win	(Cambodia) Ly Phea	Muay Thai Super Champ	Bangkok, Thailand	Decision	3	3:00
2019-06-17	Win	(Iran) Mostafa Tabtaghzade	Muay Thai Super Champ	Bangkok, Thailand	Decision	3	3:00
2019-03-16	Win	(France) Yassine Hamlaoui	Emperor Chok Dee	France	Decision	5	3:00
2017-09-23	Loss	(China) Wei Rui	Glory of Heroes: Luoyang - GOH 63 kg Championship Tournament, Semi-Finals	Luoyang, Henan	Decision (Unanimous)	3	3:00
2017-08-05	Win	(China) Jin Ying	Wu Lin Feng 2017: China VS Thailand	Zhengzhou, China	Decision	3	3:00
2016-11-27	Win	(France) Celestin Mendes	Warriors Night	France	TKO (Left Elbow)	3	
2016-10-01	Win	(China) Kong Long	Glory of Heroes 5	Zhengzhou, China	Decision	3	3:00
2016-09-14	Draw	(Thailand) Sangmanee Sor Tienpo	Rajadamnern Stadium	Bangkok, Thailand	Draw	5	3:00
2016-07-21	Win	(Thailand) Sangmanee Sor Tienpo	Rajadamnern Stadium	Bangkok, Thailand	Decision	5	3:00
2016-03-31	Loss	(Thailand) Sangmanee Sor Tienpo	Onesongchai Fights, Rajadamnern Stadium	Bangkok, Thailand	Decision	5	3:00
2016-03-05	Win	(China) Shou Rong	Wu Lin Feng : China vs Thailand	China	Decision	3	3:00
2016-02-24	Win	(Thailand) Sangmanee Sor Tienpo	Onesongchai Fights, Rajadamnern Stadium	Bangkok, Thailand	Decision	5	3:00
2016-01-24	Win	(Thailand) Saeksan Or. Kwanmuang	Samui Festival	Koh Samui, Thailand	Decision	5	3:00
2015-12-23	Win	(Thailand) Panpayak Sitjatik	Rajadamnern Stadium	Bangkok, Thailand	KO (Straight Left)	3	
2015-11-19	Win	(Thailand) Phet Utong Or. Kwanmuang	Rajadamnern Stadium	Bangkok, Thailand	KO (Left Cross)	3	
2015-10-14	Loss	(Thailand) Sangmanee Sor Tienpo	Onesongchai Anniversary Show, Rajadamnern Stadium	Bangkok, Thailand	Decision	5	3:00
2015-09-10	Win	(Thailand) Phet Utong Or. Kwanmuang	Rajadamnern Stadium	Bangkok, Thailand	Decision	5	3:00
2015-07-02	Loss	(Thailand) Muangthai PKSaenchaimuaythaigym	Tor.Chaiwat Fight, Rajadamnern Stadium	Bangkok, Thailand	Decision	5	3:00
2015-06-04	Draw	(Thailand) Saeksan Or. Kwanmuang	Rajadamnern Stadium	Bangkok, Thailand	Decision	5	3:00
2015-03-30	Win	(Thailand) Thaksinlek Kiatniwat	Rajadamnern Stadium	Bangkok, Thailand	Decision	5	3:00
2015-02-12	Win	(Thailand) Saeksan Or. Kwanmuang	Rajadamnern Stadium	Bangkok, Thailand	Decision	5	3:00
2015-01-08	Win	(Thailand) Thaksinlek Kiatniwat	Rajadamnern Stadium	Bangkok, Thailand	Decision	5	3:00
2014-12-01	Win	(Thailand) Sangmanee Sor Tienpo	Rajadamnern Stadium	Bangkok, Thailand	Decision	5	3:00
2014-11-10	Draw	(Thailand) Sangmanee Sor Tienpo	Rajadamnern Stadium	Bangkok, Thailand	Draw	5	3:00
2014-10-08	Win	(Thailand) Sangmanee Sor Tienpo	Rajadamnern Stadium	Bangkok, Thailand	Decision	5	3:00
2014-08-14	Loss	(Thailand) Superlek Kiatmuu9	Rajadamnern Stadium	Bangkok, Thailand	Decision	5	3:00
2014-06-25	Win	(Thailand) Sangmanee Sor Tienpo	Rajadamnern Stadium	Bangkok, Thailand	Decision	5	3:00
2014-05-07	Loss	(Thailand) Singtongnoi Por.Telakun	Rajadamnern Stadium	Bangkok, Thailand	Decision	5	3:00
2014-02-28	Loss	(Thailand) Rungphet Kaiyanghadao	Lumpinee Stadium	Bangkok, Thailand	Decision	5	3:00
For the 126lbs Thailand title.
2014-01-17	Win	(Thailand) Sirimongkol P.K.Muaythai	Lumpinee Stadium	Bangkok, Thailand	Decision	5	3:00
2013-12-03	Loss	(Thailand) Superlek Kiatmuu9	Lumpinee Stadium	Bangkok, Thailand	Decision	5	3:00
For the 126lbs Thailand title.
2013-11-06	Win	(Thailand) Lamnammoon Sakchaichote	Rajadamnern Stadium	Bangkok, Thailand	Decision	5	3:00
2013-10-08	Loss	(Thailand) Superbank Mor Ratanabandit	Lumpinee Stadium	Bangkok, Thailand	Decision	5	3:00
For the Lumpinee Stadium Featherweight (126 lbs) title
2013-09-11	Win	(Thailand) Pettawee Sor Kittichai	Lumpinee Stadium	Bangkok, Thailand	Decision	5	3:00
2013-08-05	Win	(Thailand) Muangthai PKSaenchaimuaythaigym	Rajadamnern Stadium	Bangkok, Thailand	TKO (Ref.stop./Broken teeth)	3	0:38
2013-07-09	Win	(Thailand) Yodtongthai Por.Telakun	Lumpinee Stadium	Bangkok, Thailand	Decision	5	3:00
2013-06-03	Draw	(Thailand) Pettawee Sor Kittichai	Rajadamnern Stadium	Bangkok, Thailand	Decision	5	3:00
2013-05-07	Loss	(Thailand) Pokaew Fonjangchonburi	Lumpinee Stadium	Bangkok, Thailand	Decision	5	3:00
2013-04-05	Win	(Thailand) Pettawee Sor Kittichai	Lumpinee Stadium	Bangkok, Thailand	KO (punch)	3	
2013-02-21	Win	(Thailand) Wisanupon Sujeebameekeow	Rajadamnern Stadium	Bangkok, Thailand	Decision	5	3:00
2012-12-24	Win	(Thailand) Rungrat Naratrikul	Rajadamnern Stadium	Bangkok, Thailand	Decision	5	3:00
2012-11-22	Win	(Thailand) Fonluang Sitboonmee	Rajadamnern Stadium	Bangkok, Thailand	Decision	5	3:00
2012-10-29	Win	(Thailand) Luknimit Singklongsi	Rajadamnern Stadium	Bangkok, Thailand	Decision	5	3:00
2012-10-08	Win	(Thailand) Sayannoi Tor Laksong	Rajadamnern Stadium	Bangkok, Thailand	KO	3	
2012-09-03	Win	(Thailand) Lomtalay Sitzoraueng	Sor.Sommai Rajadamnern Stadium	Bangkok, Thailand	Decision	5	3:00
2012-08-08	Win	(Thailand) Khunsueklek Or Kwanmuang	Sor.Sommai Rajadamnern Stadium	Bangkok, Thailand	Decision	5	3:00
2012-05-31	Win	(Thailand) Naka Kaewsamrit	Sor.Sommai Rajadamnern Stadium	Bangkok, Thailand	Decision	5	3:00
2012-05-03	Win	(Thailand) Theeva Tor.Surat	Lumpinee Stadium	Bangkok, Thailand	Decision	5	3:00
2011-08-08	Win	(Thailand) Yodmongkon Muangsima	Rajadamnern Stadium	Bangkok, Thailand	Decision	5	3:00
2011-03-15	Loss	(Thailand) Theeva Tor.Surat	Lumpinee Stadium	Bangkok, Thailand	Decision	5	3:00
2011-02-21	Loss	(Thailand) Singsuriya Alloysrinakorn	Rajadamnern Stadium	Thailand	Decision	5	3:00
2011-01-21	Loss	(Thailand) Luknimit Singklongsi	Lumpinee Stadium	Bangkok, Thailand	Decision	5	3:00
2010-12-16	Win	(Thailand) Yodmongkon Muangsima	Rajadamnern Stadium	Bangkok, Thailand	Decision	5	3:00
2010-11-11	Win	(Thailand) Theeva Tor.Surat	Rajadamnern Stadium	Bangkok, Thailand	Decision	5	3:00
2010-09-15	Win	(Thailand) Thaveesak	Rajadamnern Stadium	Bangkok, Thailand	Decision	5	3:00
2009-07-09	Loss	(Thailand) Anuwatlek Por Telakun	Rajadamnern Stadium	Bangkok, Thailand	Decision	5	3:00
2009-06-08	Loss	(Thailand) Anuwatlek Por Telakun	Rajadamnern Stadium	Bangkok, Thailand	Decision	5	3:00
2009-03-12	Win	(Thailand) Kaensak Tor.Muangong	Onesongchai, Rajadamnern Stadium	Bangkok, Thailand	KO	2	
Legend: Win Loss Draw/No contest Notes
