= Rangkhao Wor.Sangprapai =

Muay Thai fighter

- Born: Songkhla Province, Thailand
- Other names: Rungkao Jaroenkittikon
- Height: 183 cm (6 ft 0 in)
- Weight: 61 kg (134 lb; 9.6 st)
- Stance: Orthodox
- Fighting out of: Bangkok, Thailand

Rangkhao Wor.Sangprapai (Thai: หรั่งขาว ว.สังข์ประไพ) is a Muay Thai fighter.

== Titles and accomplishments ==
- Professional Boxing Association of Thailand (PAT)
  - 2016 Thailand 126 lbs Champion (1 defense)
- True4U
  - 2016 True4u 126 lbs Champion (1 defense)
  - 2017 CP-Meiji Tournament Winner
- Rajadamnern Stadium
  - 2019 Rajadamnern Stadium 130 lbs Champion
  - 2025 interim Rajadamnern Stadium Super Lightweight (140 lbs) Champion

== Fight record ==
Date	Result	Opponent	Event	Location	Method	Round	Time
2026-02-14	Loss	(Thailand) Dam Parunchai	Rajadamnern World Series, Rajadamnern Stadium	Bangkok, Thailand	Decision (Unanimous)	5	3:00
For the Rajadamnern Stadium Super Lightweight (140 lbs) title.
2025-11-28	Win	(Thailand) Flukenoi Kiatfahlikit	Rajadamnern World Series, Rajadamnern Stadium	Bangkok, Thailand	Decision (Unanimous)	5	3:00
Wins the interim Rajadamnern Stadium Super Lightweight (140 lbs) title.
2025-09-20	Win	(Iran) Parsa Aminipour	Rajadamnern World Series	Bangkok, Thailand	Decision (Unanimous)	3	3:00
2025-07-05	Win	(Iran) Ramtin Hanafi	Rajadamnern World Series	Bangkok, Thailand	Decision (Unanimous)	3	3:00
2024-05-11	Win	(Iran) Vahid Nikkah	Rajadamnern World Series	Bangkok, Thailand	KO (Knees)	2	1:22
2024-02-13	Loss	(Thailand) Nuenglanlek Jitmuangnon	Muaymansananmuang Mahasarakham	Maha Sarakham province, Thailand	KO (Low kicks)	1	2:30
2023-12-26	Win	(Thailand) Khunhanlek Kiatcharoenchai	Ruamponkon Surat + Chang Muay Thai Kiatpetch Sanjorn	Surat Thani province, Thailand	Decision	5	3:00
2023-11-09	Loss	(Thailand) Chujaroen Dabransarakarm	Petchyindee, Rajadamnern Stadium	Bangkok, Thailand	Decision	5	3:00
2023-07-05	Loss	(Thailand) Khunhanlek Kiatcharoenchai	Satun Super Fight 2 + Kiatpetch, Kiatcharoenchai Stadium	Satun province, Thailand	Decision	5	3:00
2023-05-12	Win	(Thailand) Superball Tded99	Muay Thai Lumpinee Pitaktam	Songkhla province, Thailand	KO (Elbows)	3	
2023-04-08	Loss	(Thailand) Thaksinlek D.N.Muaythai	Petchyindee + Rajadamnern World Series	Bangkok, Thailand	Decision (Unanimous)	3	3:00
2022-12-28	Loss	(Thailand) Chujaroen Dabransarakarm	Muay Thai Rakya Soosakon + SAT Super Fight Withee Tin Thai + Petchyindee	Bangkok, Thailand	Decision	5	3:00
2022-11-18	Win	(Thailand) Hercules Phetsimean	Ruamponkon + Prachin	Prachinburi province, Thailand	KO (Elbows)	2	
2022-08-19	Win	(Iraq) Sajjad Zubaidi	Rajadamnern World Series	Bangkok, Thailand	Decision	3	3:00
2022-05-13	Win	(Thailand) Thaksinlek D.N.Muaythai	Muaymanwansuk, Rangsit Stadium	Rangsit, Thailand	KO (Elbow)	3	
2022-03-27	Draw	(Thailand) Thaksinlek D.N.Muaythai	MAX Muay Thai	Pattaya, Thailand	Decision	3	3:00
2021-12-30	Loss	(Thailand) Thaksinlek D.N.Muaythai	Petchyindee, Rangsit Stadium	Rangsit, Thailand	Decision	5	3:00
For the vacant WMO World Lightweight title
2021-11-26	Win	(Thailand) Kaonar P.K. Saenchai Muaythaigym	Muaymanwansuk, Rangsit Stadium	Rangsit, Thailand	Decision	5	3:00
2021-10-22	Loss	(Thailand) Thaksinlek D.N.Muaythai	Muaymanwansuk	Buriram province, Thailand	Decision	5	3:00
2021-03-13	Loss	(Thailand) Superball Tded99	Majujaya Muay Thai, Temporary Outdoors Stadium	Pattani, Thailand	KO (left hook)	4	
2020-11-27	Win	(Thailand) Dechsakda SorJor.TongPrachin	Muaymanwansuk, Rangsit Stadium	Pathum Thani, Thailand	KO (knee to the head)	4	
2020-10-23	Win	(Thailand) Samingdet Nor.Anuwatgym	Muaymanwansuk, Rangsit Stadium	Pathum Thani, Thailand	Decision	5	3:00
2020-01-22	Win	(Thailand) Panpayak Sitchefboontham	Rajadamnern Stadium	Bangkok, Thailand	Decision	5	3:00
2019-10-10	Loss	(Thailand) Phet Utong Or. Kwanmuang	Rajadamnern Stadium	Bangkok, Thailand	Decision	5	3:00
2019-08-08	Loss	(Thailand) Superlek Kiatmuu9	Rajadamnern Stadium	Bangkok, Thailand	Decision	5	3:00
2019-07-11	Win	(Thailand) Superlek Kiatmuu9	Rajadamnern Stadium	Bangkok, Thailand	Decision	5	3:00
Wins the vacant Rajadamnern Stadium 130 lbs title.
2019-05-24	Win	(Thailand) Dennapoh Sor.Thanyalak	Lumpinee Stadium	Bangkok, Thailand	KO (Left Knee to the body)	3	
2019-01-17	Win	(Thailand) Extra Sitworaphat	Rajadamnern Stadium	Bangkok, Thailand	Decision	5	3:00
2018-10-10	Loss	(Thailand) Detsakda Phukongyatsuepudomsuk	Rajadamnern Stadium	Bangkok, Thailand	Decision	5	3:00
2018-08-09	Loss	(Thailand) Rungkit Wor.Sanprapai	Rajadamnern Stadium	Bangkok, Thailand	Decision	5	3:00
2018-07-05	Loss	(Thailand) Rungkit Wor.Sanprapai	Rajadamnern Stadium	Bangkok, Thailand	Decision	5	3:00
2018-05-09	Win	(Thailand) Petchsongphak SitJaroensap	Rajadamnern Stadium	Bangkok, Thailand	KO	4	
2018-04-09	Win	(Thailand) Petchsongphak SitJaroensap	Rajadamnern Stadium	Bangkok, Thailand	Decision	5	3:00
2018-02-27	Win	(France) Elias Mahmoudi	Best Of Siam XII Lumpinee Stadium	Bangkok, Thailand	Decision	5	3:00
2017-12-27	Loss	(Thailand) Yamin P.K.SaenchaiMuayThaiGym	Rajadamnern Stadium	Bangkok, Thailand	KO (High Kick)	2	
2017-11-24	Win	(Thailand) Surachai Sor.Sommai	Rajadamnern Stadium	Bangkok, Thailand	Decision	5	3:00
2017-09-04	Loss	(Thailand) Detsakda Phukongyatsuepudomsuk	Rajadamnern Stadium	Bangkok, Thailand	KO (Punches)	3	
2017-07-10	Loss	(Thailand) Phetwason Or.Daokrajai	Rajadamnern Stadium	Bangkok, Thailand	Decision	5	3:00
For a 1.8 million baht side-bet.
2017-04-07	Win	(Thailand) Klasuek Petjinda	Rangsit Stadium	Pathum Thani, Thailand	Decision	5	3:00
Wins CP-Meiji Tournament 126 lbs title.
2017-03-10	Win	(Thailand) Detsakda Phukongyatsuepudomsuk	Rangsit Stadium	Pathum Thani, Thailand	Decision	5	3:00
2017-01-20	Win	(Thailand) Kundiew Payapkumpan	Rangsit Stadium	Thailand	Decision	5	3:00
Defends the True4u 126 lbs title.
2016-12-16	Win	(Thailand) Klasuek Petjinda	Rangsit Stadium	Pathum Thani, Thailand	Decision	5	3:00
2016-11-18	Win	(Thailand) Dennapoh Sor.Thanyalak	Rangsit Stadium	Pathum Thani, Thailand	KO	4	
2016-10-06	Draw	(Thailand) Kundiew Payapkumpan	Rajadamnern Stadium	Bangkok, Thailand	Decision	5	3:00
2016-08-11	Loss	(Thailand) Petnamngam Or.Kwanmuang	Rajadamnern Stadium	Bangkok, Thailand	Decision	5	3:00
2016-06-10	Win	(Thailand) Klasuek Petjinda	Lumpinee Stadium	Bangkok, Thailand	Decision	5	3:00
Defends Thailand 126 lbs title.
2016-04-16	Loss	(Thailand) Phetsongkom Sitjaroensap	Omnoi Boxing Stadium	Thailand	Decision	5	3:00
For the Omnoi Boxing Stadium 130 lbs title.
2016-03-18	Win	(Thailand) Tomas Sor.Chaijaroen	Lumpinee Stadium	Bangkok, Thailand	KO (Right Elbow)	2	
Wins Thailand 126 lbs title.
2016-02-26	Win	(Thailand) Tomas Sor.Chaijaroen	Lumpinee Stadium	Bangkok, Thailand	Decision	5	3:00
2016-01-22	Win	(Thailand) Hunyont Sitjaroensup	Lumpinee Stadium	Bangkok, Thailand	KO	3	
2015-12-25	Win	(Thailand) Classic Sitkunwason	Lumpinee Stadium	Bangkok, Thailand	Decision	5	3:00
2015-10-24	Win	(Thailand) Kotchasan	Rajadamnern Stadium	Bangkok, Thailand	KO	3	
2015-09-19	Loss	(Thailand) Supernay Teeded 99	Lumpinee Stadium	Bangkok, Thailand	Decision	5	3:00
2015-08-15	Win	(Thailand) Longern Dabrunsarakam	Rajadamnern Stadium	Bangkok, Thailand	KO	2	
2015-05-25	Win	(Thailand) Yimsiam Nakhonmuangdet	Rajadamnern Stadium	Bangkok, Thailand	KO	4	
Legend: Win Loss Draw/No contest Notes
