= Rungkit Wor.Sanprapai =

Thai Muay Thai fighter (born 2002)

- Born: Tidwat Inton; January 20, 2002 (age 24); Ranong, Thailand
- Other names: Rungkit Morbeskamala; Rungkit Kiatnadee; Rungkit Rawaimuaythai; Rungkit Bor.Rungrot (รุ่งกิจ บ.รุ่งโรจน์); Cyber Sor.Tienpo
- Height: 172 cm (5 ft 7 1/2 in)
- Weight: 63 kg (139 lb; 9.9 st)
- Style: Muay Fimeu
- Fighting out of: Bangkok, Thailand

Kickboxing record
- Total: 102
- Wins: 68
- Losses: 34

Rungkit Wor.Sanprapai (Thai: รุ่งกิจ ว.สังข์ประไพ; born January 20, 2002) is a Thai Muay Thai fighter.

== Biography ==
Rungkit started training in Muay Thai at the age of 7 after seeing others kids training near his hometown of Ranong. He quickly gained recognition and began fighting in the Bangkok stadiums at age 12.

In 2018, Rungkit had a high number of victories at Rajadamnern Stadium and was granted a title shot for the vacant 130 lbs belt, in which he won against Rodtang Jitmuangnon at only 16 years old. As a result of his remarkable victories during that year, Rungkit was the runner-up for the Sports Authority of Thailand Fighter of the year Award.

In 2019, he took part in the Rise World Series kickboxing tournament.

On March 10, 2019, he defeated Fred Cordeiro by unanimous decision in the First Round of the Rise World Series.

On July 21, 2019, Rungkit was eliminated by Shiro in the semi-finals after a very close fight which went to an extra round and saw Rungkit lose by split decision.

Rungkit vacated his 130lbs Rajadamnern title shortly before his Rise World series semi final stating that he wouldn't be able to make that weight in a near future.

== Titles and accomplishments ==
- Professional Boxing Association of Thailand (PAT)
  - 2016 Thailand 118 lbs Champion
- True4U Petchyindee
  - 2017 CP Muaymanwansuk Tournament 120lbs Champion
  - 2017 True4U 120 lbs Champion
  - 2022 True4U 140 lbs Champion
- Rajadamnern Stadium
  - 2018 Rajadamnern Stadium 130 lbs Champion
  - 2018 Rajadamnern Stadium Fighter of the Year

== Fight record ==
Muay Thai record
70 Wins, 34 Losses, 2 Draws
Date	Result	Opponent	Event	Location	Method	Round	Time
2026-05-08	Loss	(Thailand) Dedduanglek Torfunfarm	ONE Friday Fights 153, Lumpinee Stadium	Bangkok, Thailand	Decision (Unanimous)	3	3:00
2025-12-28	Loss	(Italy) Alessandro Sara	Channel 7 Stadium	Bangkok, Thailand	Decision	5	3:00
2025-06-21	Win	(Thailand) Kongsuk Sitsarawatsuer	Matuphum: Mother Land of Muay Thai	Sa Kaeo Province, Thailand	Decision	5	3:00
2025-01-04	Loss	(Thailand) Phetphuthai Sitsarawatseua	Rajadamnern World Series, Rajadamnern Stadium	Bangkok, Thailand	KO (Elbow)	2	
For the interim Rajadamnern Stadium Super Lightweight (140 lbs) title.
2024-11-05	Win	(Thailand) Pornpitak Tor.Tanthai	Muaymansananmuang, Rangsit Stadium	Pathum Thani, Thailand	Decision	5	3:00
2024-09-21	Win	(Thailand) Petchchaimet Tor.Tanthai	Hero Fight Muay Thai Nai Tamnan + Petchyindee	Khon Kaen Province, Thailand	Decision	5	3:00
2024-06-29	Loss	(Australia) Chadd Collins	War on the Shore	Gold Coast, Australia	KO	2	
For the vacant WMO World Super Lightweight (-63.5kg) title.
2024-05-18	Loss	(Thailand) Nuenglanlek Jitmuangnon	Rajadamnern World Series	Bangkok, Thailand	KO (Elbow)	1	3:00
2024-03-10	Loss	(Thailand) Khunhanlek Kiatcharoenchai	Channel 7 Stadium	Bangkok, Thailand	Decision	5	3:00
For the vacant Channel 7 Stadium Welterweight (147 lbs) title.
2023-12-29	Win	(Thailand) PetchChaimet PetchyindeeAcademy	Matuphum Muay Thai + Petchyindee	Songkhla Province, Thailand	Decision	5	3:00
2023-12-09	Win	(Azerbaijan) Yusuf Memmadov	Rajadamnern World Series	Bangkok, Thailand	Decision	3	3:00
2023-10-28	Loss	(Thailand) Khunhanlek Singmawynn	Muay Thai Vithee TinThai + Kiatpetch	Buriram Province, Thailand	Decision	5	3:00
2023-09-28	Win	(Thailand) Siwakorn Kiatjaroenchai	Wan Ittipon Mahasakun, Rajadamnern Stadium	Bangkok, Thailand	Decision	5	3:00
2023-08-25	Win	(Thailand) Petchchaimet SorJor.TongPrachin	Rakya Suwitee Tin Thai Nai Din Daen Muang Kwan Phayao + Muaymanwansuk + Petchyindee	Kwan Phayao, Thailand	Decision	5	3:00
2023-07-05	Draw	(Thailand) Siwakorn PK.Saenchaimuaythaigym	Satun Super Fight 2 + Kiatpetch, Kiatcharoenchai Stadium	Satun province, Thailand	Decision	5	3:00
2023-05-12	Win	(Thailand) Otop AnnyMuayThai	Muay Thai Lumpinee Pitaktam	Songkhla province, Thailand	TKO (Punches + elbows)	4	
2023-03-31	Loss	(Thailand) PetchChaimet SorJor.TongPrachin	Muaymanwansuk, Rangsit Stadium	Pathum Thani, Thailand	Decision	5	3:00
2022-12-17	Loss	(Thailand) Yodlekphet Or.Atchariya	Sinbi Stadium	Phuket, Thailand	KO (Low kicks)	3	
2022-11-25	Loss	(Thailand) Thaksinlek D.N.Muaythai	Muaymanwansuk, Rangsit Stadium	Pathum Thani, Thailand	Decision	5	3:00
Loses the True4U 140 lbs title.
2022-10-28	Loss	(Thailand) Yodlekphet Or.Atchariya	Rajadamnern World Series	Bangkok, Thailand	Decision (Unanimous)	3	3:00
2022-09-21	Loss	(Thailand) Chujaroen Dabransarakarm	Sinbi Muay Thai Birthday show + 789Tiger, Bangla Stadium	Phuket, Thailand	Decision	5	3:00
2022-08-11	Win	(Thailand) Thaksinlek D.N.Muaythai	Petchyindee, Rajadamnern Stadium	Bangkok, Thailand	Decision	5	3:00
2022-07-05	Win	(Thailand) Chatpetch SorJor.TongPrachin	Muaymansananmuang, Rangsit Stadium	Rangsit, Thailand	KO (Right hook)	3	
Wins the vacant True4U 140 lbs title
2022-05-12	Loss	(Thailand) Superball Tded99	Petchyindee, Rajadamnern Stadium	Bangkok, Thailand	Decision	5	3:00
2022-03-25	Loss	(Thailand) Flukenoi Kiatfahlikit	Muaymanwansuk, Rajadamnern Stadium	Bangkok, Thailand	Decision	5	3:00
For the True4U 135 lbs title
2022-02-17	Loss	(Thailand) Thaksinlek D.N.Muaythai	Petchyindee, Rajadamnern Stadium	Bangkok, Thailand	Decision	5	3:00
2021-12-30	Loss	(Thailand) Superball Teeded99	Muay Thai SAT Super Fight WiteetinThai	Phuket, Thailand	Decision	5	3:00
2021-11-12	Win	(Thailand) Thaksinlek Kiatniwat	Muaymanwansuk	Thailand	Decision	5	3:00
2021-04-08	Loss	(Thailand) Superlek Kiatmuu9	SuekMahakamMuayRuamPonKon Chana + Petchyindee	Songkhla province, Thailand	Decision	5	3:00
2021-03-12	Win	(Thailand) Sangmanee Sor Tienpo	True4U Muaymanwansuk, Rangsit Stadium	Rangsit, Thailand	Decision	5	3:00
2020-12-04	Draw	(Thailand) Chujaroen Dabransarakarm	Muaymanwansuk, Rangsit Stadium	Rangsit, Thailand	Decision	5	3:00
2020-11-05	Loss	(Thailand) Sangmanee Sor Tienpo	True4U Muaymanwansuk, Rangsit Stadium	Rangsit, Thailand	Decision	5	3:00
2020-09-10	Win	(Thailand) Yodlekpet Or. Pitisak	Sor.Sommai Birthday, Rajadamnern Stadium	Bangkok, Thailand	Decision	5	3:00
2020-07-17	Win	(Thailand) Kaewkangwan Priwayo	True4U Muaymanwansuk, Rangsit Stadium	Rangsit, Thailand	Decision	5	3:00
2020-02-28	Loss	(Thailand) Phet Utong Or. Kwanmuang	Ruamponkonchon Pratan Super Fight	Pathum Thani, Thailand	Decision	5	3:00
2019-12-23	Win	(Thailand) Saeksan Or. Kwanmuang	Rajadamnern Stadium	Bangkok, Thailand	Decision (Unanimous)	5	3:00
2019-11-21	Win	(Thailand) Mongkolpetch Petchyindee	Rajadamnern Stadium	Bangkok, Thailand	Decision	5	3:00
2019-10-05	Loss	(Thailand) Suakim PK Saenchaimuaythaigym	Yod Muay Thai Naikhanomton	Buriram, Thailand	Decision	5	3:00
2019-09-05	Loss	(Thailand) Superlek Kiatmuu9	Rajadamnern Stadium	Bangkok, Thailand	Decision	5	3:00
2019-07-21	Loss	(Japan) Shiro	Rise World Series 2019 Semi Finals	Osaka, Japan	Ex.R Decision (Split)	4	3:00
2019-05-29	Win	(Thailand) Phet Utong Or. Kwanmuang	Rajadamnern Stadium	Bangkok, Thailand	KO (Low Kick)	3	
2019-04-04	Loss	(Thailand) Superlek Kiatmuu9	Rajadamnern Stadium	Bangkok, Thailand	Decision	5	3:00
2019-03-10	Win	(Portugal) Frederico Cordeiro	Rise World Series 2019 First Round	Tokyo, Japan	Decision (Unanimous)	3	3:00
2019-02-01	Win	(Thailand) Suakim PK Saenchaimuaythaigym	Lumpinee Stadium	Bangkok, Thailand	Decision	5	3:00
2018-12-26	Loss	(Thailand) Suakim PK Saenchaimuaythaigym	Rajadamnern Stadium	Bangkok, Thailand	Decision	5	3:00
2018-11-22	Win	(Thailand) Petchdam Petchyindee Academy	Rajadamnern Stadium	Bangkok, Thailand	Decision	5	3:00
2018-10-25	Win	(Thailand) Rodtang Jitmuangnon	Rajadamnern Stadium	Bangkok, Thailand	Decision	5	3:00
Wins vacant 130lbs Rajadamnern title
2018-09-13	Win	(Thailand) Mongkolchai Kwaitonggym	Rajadamnern Stadium	Bangkok, Thailand	TKO	3	2:55
2018-08-09	Win	(Thailand) Rangkhao Wor.Sangprapai	Rajadamnern Stadium	Bangkok, Thailand	Decision	5	3:00
2018-07-05	Win	(Thailand) Rangkhao Wor.Sangprapai	Rajadamnern Stadium	Bangkok, Thailand	Decision	5	3:00
2018-06-07	Win	(Thailand) Petchdam Petchyindee Academy	Rajadamnern Stadium	Bangkok, Thailand	Decision	5	3:00
2018-05-09	Loss	(Thailand) Petchdam Petchyindee Academy	Rajadamnern Stadium	Bangkok, Thailand	Decision	5	3:00
For WBC Muaythai 126lbs World title
2018-03-15	Win	(Thailand) Chanasuek Kor Kampanath	Rajadamnern Stadium	Bangkok, Thailand	Decision	5	3:00
2018-01-31	Win	(Thailand) Kiewpayak Jitmuangnon	Rajadamnern Stadium	Bangkok, Thailand	Decision	5	3:00
2017-12-27	Win	(Thailand) Krasuk Phetjinda	Rajadamnern Stadium	Bangkok, Thailand	Decision	5	3:00
2017-11-01	Win	(Thailand) Kengkla Por.Pekko	Rajadamnern Stadium	Bangkok, Thailand	Decision	5	3:00
2017	Win	(Argentina) Cristian Pastore		Thailand	Decision	3	3:00
2017-08-04	Loss	(Thailand) Krasuk Phetjinda	True4U, Rangsit Stadium	Rangsit, Thailand	Decision	5	3:00
For the 130 lbs True4U Muaymunwansuk title.
2017-06-05	Win	(Thailand) Kriangkrai PetchyindeeAcademy	Rajadamnern Stadium	Bangkok, Thailand	Decision	5	3:00
2017-05-04	Win	(Thailand) Kengkart Por.Pekko	Wachirarattanawong Promotion	Thailand	Decision	5	3:00
2017-03-22	Win	(Thailand) PhetBankhaek So.Sommai	Rajadamnern Stadium	Thailand	Decision	5	3:00
2017-02-10	Win	(Thailand) Phetkeng Or.Boonchuay	True4U, Rangsit Stadium	Rangsit, Thailand	Decision	5	3:00
2017-01-13	Win	(Thailand) Yodsenchai Sor.Sopit	True4U, Rangsit Stadium	Rangsit, Thailand	Decision	5	3:00
Wins CP Muaymumwansuek Tournament and 120lbs True4U title
2016-12-09	Win	(Thailand) YodET Tede99	Rangsit Stadium	Rangsit, Thailand	KO	4	
2016-09-30	Win	(Thailand) Phetnakin Worsangprapai	Rangsit Stadium	Rangsit, Thailand	Decision	5	3:00
2016-09-02	Win	(Thailand) Thanupetch Witsanukollakan	Rangsit Stadium	Rangsit, Thailand	Decision	5	3:00
2016-08-05	Loss	(Thailand) Pone Muanglavo	True4U, Rangsit Stadium	Rangsit, Thailand	Decision	5	3:00
2016-06-20	Win	(Thailand) Teptaksin Sor.Sonsing	Rajadamnern Stadium	Bangkok, Thailand	Decision	5	3:00
2016-05-14	Loss	(Thailand) Kompatak SinbiMuayThai	Rangsit Stadium	Rangsit, Thailand	Decision	5	3:00
2016-04-16	Loss	(Thailand) Nattaphon Nacheukvittayakom		Rangsit, Thailand	Decision	5	3:00
2016-02-27	Win	(Thailand) Kongtoranee Sor.Boongium		Kalasin Province, Thailand	Decision	5	3:00
2016-02-19	Win	(Thailand) Phetchiangkwan Nayoksomdet	Rajadamnern Stadium	Bangkok, Thailand	Decision	5	3:00
2016-02-06	Win	(Thailand) Khunhan Sitthongsak	Ransgsit Stadium	Thailand	Decision	5	3:00
Wins Thailand 118 lbs title
2016-01-02	Win	(Thailand) Pawarit Somjitgym		Krabi, Thailand	Decision	5	3:00
2015-12-03	Loss	(Thailand) Jaroenpon Popthirathum	Rajadamnern Stadium	Bangkok, Thailand	Decision	5	3:00
2015-11-09	Loss	(Thailand) Nongyot Sitjekan	Rajadamnern Stadium	Bangkok, Thailand	Decision	5	3:00
2015-10-02	Win	(Thailand) Yokmorakot Wor.Sangpapai	Lumpinee Stadium	Bangkok, Thailand	Decision	5	3:00
2015-09-09	Win	(Thailand) Yokmorakot Wor.Sangpapai	Rajadamnern Stadium	Bangkok, Thailand	Decision	5	3:00
2015-08-11	Loss	(Thailand) Wanchai Kiatmuu9	Lumpinee Stadium	Bangkok, Thailand	Decision	5	3:00
2015-07-14	Loss	(Thailand) Thanadet Thor.Pan 49	Lumpinee Stadium	Bangkok, Thailand	Decision	5	3:00
2015-05-21	Loss	(Thailand) Achanai PetchyindeeAcademy	Rajadamnern Stadium	Bangkok, Thailand	Decision	5	3:00
2015-03-25	Win	(Thailand) YodET Tede99	Rajadamnern Stadium	Bangkok, Thailand	Decision	5	3:00
2014-12-26	Win	(Thailand) Phanmongkol Sor.Thaviwat	Lumpinee Stadium	Bangkok, Thailand	Decision	5	3:00
2013-12-15	Win	(Thailand) Geng Kor Glomgliew	Aswindam Stadium	Bangkok, Thailand	Decision	5	3:00
2012-12-15	Win	(Thailand) Kongkriengkrai KoMapraoMuayThai		Phuket, Thailand	Decision	5	3:00
Wins Southern Thailand 80 lbs title
Legend: Win Loss Draw/No contest Notes
