= Kaonar P.K. Saenchai Muaythaigym =

Thai professional Muay Thai fighter

- Born: Udomsak Onkaew; May 22, 1990 (age 36); Nakhon Si Thammarat, Thailand
- Other names: Kaonar Or.Pimonsri; Kaonar Sor.Jor.Tongprajin; Nongbeer Choknamwong (น้องเบียร์ โชคงามวงศ์); Gaonar PK.Saenchai Muaythaigym
- Height: 170 cm (5 ft 7 in)
- Style: Muay Thai (Muay Femur)
- Stance: Southpaw
- Fighting out of: Bangkok, Thailand
- Team: P.K.Saenchai Muaythai Gym

Kickboxing record
- Total: 190
- Wins: 141
- Losses: 42
- Draws: 7

Udomsak Onkaew (Thai: ???; born May 22, 1990), known professionally as Kaonar P.K. Saenchai Muaythaigym (Thai: ก้าวหน้า พี.เค.แสนชัยมวยไทยยิม) is a Thai professional Muay Thai fighter. He is a former Lumpinee Stadium Light Flyweight Champion.

He was one of ten fighters on the shortlist of candidates for Sports Writers of Thailand 'Fighter of the Year' award for the period of May 7, 2018 to July 3, 2019.

In 2020, The Nation ranked him as number 8 on their top 10 pound-for-pound best Muay Thai fighter list. He was a former Phoenix FC Super Featherweight champion. He has defeated some of the biggest names including wins over Rodtang Jitmuangnon, Saeksan Or. Kwanmuang, Superbank Mor Ratanabandit and Superlek Kiatmoo9.

== Career ==
He had a rematch with Rodtang Jitmuangnon in October 2020. The event took place at Siam Stadium in Bangkok and was for raising money for charity. Rodtang got the decision win.

At One Friday Nights 30, Kaonar was stopped by Saemapetch Fairtex. This was Kaonar's second time fighting in smaller gloves. Both exchanged body kicks until a jab from Saemapetch put Kaonar in his tracks.

== Titles and accomplishments ==
- Phoenix Fighting Championship
  - 2018 Phoenix FC Super Featherweight (130 lbs) Champion
- Lumpinee Stadium
  - 2007 Lumpinee Stadium Light Flyweight (108 lbs) Champion

== Fight record ==
Kickboxing record
143 Wins, 43 Losses, 7 Draws
Date	Result	Opponent	Event	Location	Method	Round	Time
2026-05-09	Loss	(United Kingdom) Jack Kennedy	Victory 16	Newcastle, England	Decision (Unanimous)	5	3:00
2026-01-31	Loss	(Iran) Sajad Sattari	Venum Fight 3	Doha, Qatar	KO (Elbow)	2	1:26
For the WBC Welterweight Muay Thai Diamond Title.
2025-10-25	Win	(China) Wang Jinbiao	Rajadamnern World Series	Bangkok, Thailand	Decision (Unanimous)	3	3:00
2025-07-19	Win	(Iran) Mohsen Fartotfard	Rajadamnern World Series	Bangkok, Thailand	Decision (Unanimous)	3	3:00
2025-02-12	Loss	(Thailand) Capitan Petchyindee Academy	WMC Samui, Phetchbuncha Stadium	Koh Samui, Thailand	Decision	5	3:00
2025-01-15	Win	(Thailand) Rotpuang TOD Muay Thai	WMC Samui	Koh Samui, Thailand	Decision	5	3:00
2023-11-24	Loss	(Brazil) Julio Lobo	ONE Friday Fights 42, Lumpinee Stadium	Bangkok, Thailand	KO (Punches)	3	0:46
2023-08-25	Loss	(Thailand) Saemapetch Fairtex	ONE Friday Fights 30, Lumpinee Stadium	Bangkok, Thailand	KO (Punches)	1	2:09
2023-06-02	Loss	(Russia) Elbrus Osmanov	ONE Friday Fights 19, Lumpinee Stadium	Bangkok, Thailand	Decision (Unanimous)	3	3:00
2023-03-11	Win	(Cambodia) Sot Kevin	Suek Muay Thai Yuen Tin	Surat Thani, Thailand	Decision	5	3:00
2023-02-27	Draw	(Cambodia) Moeun Sokhuch	Kun Khmer All Star	Phnom Penh, Cambodia	Decision	3	3:00
2023-02-04	Win	(Cambodia) Long Samnang	LWC Super Champ, Lumpinee Stadium	Bangkok, Thailand	Decision	3	3:00
2022-06-29	Win	(Thailand) Yodlekpet Or.Atchariya	Muaythai Palangmai, Rajadamnern Stadium	Bangkok, Thailand	Decision	5	3:00
2022-04-16	Win	(Thailand) Yodlekpet Or.Atchariya	Pitaktham + Sor.Sommai	Phayao province, Thailand	Referee stoppage	4	
2022-03-11	Draw	(Thailand) Yodlekpet Or.Atchariya	Pitaktham + Sor.Sommai + Palangmai	Songkhla province, Thailand	Decision	5	3:00
2021-12-30	Win	(Thailand) Yodlekpet Or.Atchariya	Muay Thai SAT Super Fight WiteetinThai	Phuket, Thailand	Decision	5	3:00
2021-11-26	Loss	(Thailand) Rangkhao Wor.Sangprapai	Muaymanwansuk, Rangsit Stadium	Rangsit, Thailand	Decision	5	3:00
2021-04-08	Loss	(Thailand) Thaksinlek DN.MuayThaiGym	SuekMahakamMuayRuamPonKon Chana + Petchyindee	Songkhla province, Thailand	Decision	5	3:00
2020-11-07	Loss	(Thailand) Superball Tded99	SAT HERO SERIES, World Siam Stadium	Bangkok, Thailand	Decision	5	3:00
2020-10-05	Loss	(Thailand) Rodtang Jitmuangnon	R1 UFA, World Siam Stadium	Bangkok, Thailand	Decision	5	3:00
2020-09-13	Win	(United States) Henry Lee	Muay Thai Super Champ	Bangkok, Thailand	Decision	3	3:00
2020-07-15	Win	(Thailand) Yodlekpet Or. Pitisak	Rajadamnern Stadium	Bangkok, Thailand	Decision	5	3:00
2020-02-27	Win	(Thailand) Rodtang Jitmuangnon	Rajadamnern Stadium	Bangkok, Thailand	Decision	5	3:00
2019-12-08	Win	(Thailand) Phlaychumphon Sor. Srisomphong	BOM 2-6～THE Battle Of Muaythai SEASON II vol.6	Tokyo, Japan	Decision (Unanimous)	5	3:00
2019-11-07	Win	(Thailand) Saeksan Or. Kwanmuang	Ruamponkon Prachin	Prachinburi, Thailand	Decision	5	3:00
2019-10-05	Draw	(Thailand) Superlek Kiatmuu9	Yod Muay Thai Naikhanomton	Buriram, Thailand	Decision	5	3:00
2019-08-16	Loss	(Thailand) Panpayak Jitmuangnon	Supit + Sor. Sommai Birthday Fights	Songkla, Thailand	Decision	5	3:00
2019-05-29	Loss	(Thailand) Saeksan Or. Kwanmuang	Rajadamnern Stadium	Bangkok, Thailand	Decision	5	3:00
For the Rajadamnern Stadium Lightweight (135 lbs) title.
2019-04-25	Win	(Thailand) Superball Tded99	Rajadamnern Stadium	Bangkok, Thailand	Decision	5	3:00
2018-12-26	Win	(Thailand) Superlek Kiatmuu9	Rajadamnern Stadium	Bangkok, Thailand	Decision	5	3:00
2018-12-09	Win	(Japan) Nobu Bravely	BOMXX - The Battle Of MuayThai 20-	Yokohama, Japan	TKO (Referee Stoppage)	2	
2018-11-07	Win	(Thailand) Superball Tded99	Rajadamnern Stadium	Bangkok, Thailand	Decision	5	3:00
2018-09-27	Win	(Thailand) Saeksan Or. Kwanmuang	Rajadamnern Stadium	Bangkok, Thailand	Decision	5	3:00
2018-07-25	Win	(Thailand) Saeksan Or. Kwanmuang	Rajadamnern Stadium	Bangkok, Thailand	Decision	5	3:00
2018-06-28	Draw	(Thailand) Saeksan Or. Kwanmuang	Rajadamnern Stadium	Bangkok, Thailand	Decision	5	3:00
2018-04-28	Win	(Thailand) Phetwason Or.Daokrajai	Phoenix 7 Phuket	Phuket, Thailand	Decision	5	3:00
Wins the Phoenix FC Super Featherweight (130 lbs) title.
2018-02-26	Win	(Thailand) Superbank Mor Ratanabandit	Phoenix 5 Bangkok	Bangkok, Thailand	Decision	5	3:00
2018-01-25	Loss	(Thailand) Phetwason Or.Daokrajai	Rajadamnern Stadium	Bangkok, Thailand	Decision	5	3:00
2017-12-21	Loss	(Thailand) Phet Utong Or. Kwanmuang	Rajadamnern Stadium	Bangkok, Thailand	Decision	5	3:00
For the vacant Rajadamnern Stadium Super Featherweight (130 lbs) title.
2017-11-13	Loss	(Thailand) Mongkolkaew Sor.Sommai	Rajadamnern Stadium	Bangkok, Thailand	Decision	5	3:00
2017-09-11	Win	(Thailand) Superbank Mor Ratanabandit	Rajadamnern Stadium	Bangkok, Thailand	Decision	5	3:00
2017-07-27	Draw	(Thailand) Superbank Mor Ratanabandit	Rajadamnern Stadium	Bangkok, Thailand	Decision	5	3:00
2017-06-28	Win	(Thailand) Phet Utong Or. Kwanmuang	Rajadamnern Stadium	Bangkok, Thailand	Decision	5	3:00
2016-11-15	Loss	(Thailand) Panpayak Jitmuangnon	Rajadamnern Stadium	Bangkok, Thailand	Decision	5	3:00
2016-10-04	Win	(Thailand) Nuenglanlek Jitmuangnon	Lumpinee Stadium	Bangkok, Thailand	Decision	5	3:00
2016-07-21	Win	(Thailand) Tuan Kor.Kumpanart	Rajadamnern Stadium	Bangkok, Thailand	Decision	5	3:00
2016-06-09	Loss	(Thailand) Panpayak Jitmuangnon	Onesongchai Fights, Rajadamnern Stadium	Bangkok, Thailand	Decision	5	3:00
2016-03-04	Loss	(Thailand) Panpayak Jitmuangnon	Kriekkrai Fights, Lumpinee Stadium	Bangkok, Thailand	Decision	5	3:00
For the Lumpinee Stadium Featherweight (126 lbs) title.
2016-02-12	Win	(Thailand) Jamesak Sakburiram	Lumpinee Stadium	Bangkok, Thailand	TKO	3	
2015-12-22	Loss	(Thailand) Panpayak Jitmuangnon	Kiatphet Fights, Lumpinee Stadium	Bangkok, Thailand	Decision	5	3:00
For the vacant Lumpinee Stadium Featherweight (126 lbs) title.
2015-11-10	Win	(Thailand) Saen Parunchai	Lumpinee Stadium	Bangkok, Thailand	Decision	5	3:00
2015-08-11	Win	(Thailand) Superlek Kiatmuu9	Lumpinee Stadium	Bangkok, Thailand	Decision	5	3:00
2015-07-02	Win	(Thailand) Phetmorakot Teeded99	Rajadamnern Stadium	Bangkok, Thailand	Decision	5	3:00
2015-04-29	Loss	(Thailand) Yuthakan Phet-Por.Tor.Or	Rajadamnern Stadium	Bangkok, Thailand	Decision	5	3:00
2015-03-07	Loss	(Thailand) Panpayak Sitjatik	Siam Omnoi Boxing Stadium	Thailand	Decision	5	3:00
2015-01-24	Win	(Thailand) Kaewkangwan Sitlekphet	Siam Omnoi Boxing Stadium	Thailand	Decision	5	3:00
2014-11-08	Win	(Thailand) Denkongkae JSP	Channel 7 Boxing Stadium	Thailand	KO	2	
2014-09-20	Loss	(Thailand) Panpayak Sitjatik	Siam Omnoi Boxing Stadium	Thailand	KO	3	
2014-07-16	Win	(Thailand) Songkom Srisuriyanyotin	Rajadamnern Stadium	Bangkok, Thailand	Decision	5	3:00
2014-02-07	Draw	(Thailand) Fonluang Sitboonmee	Lumpinee Stadium	Bangkok, Thailand	Decision	5	3:00
2014-01-07	Loss	(Thailand) Sam-A Gaiyanghadao	Lumpinee Stadium	Bangkok, Thailand	Decision	5	3:00
2013-10-08	Win	(Thailand) Wisanupon Sujeebameekeow	Lumpinee Stadium	Bangkok, Thailand	Decision	5	3:00
2013-08-15	Loss	(Thailand) Phet Utong Or. Kwanmuang	Lumpinee Stadium	Bangkok, Thailand	Decision	5	3:00
2013-07-12	Loss	(Thailand) Phet Utong Or. Kwanmuang	Lumpinee Stadium	Bangkok, Thailand	Decision	5	3:00
2013-05-17	Loss	(Thailand) Phet Utong Or. Kwanmuang	Lumpinee Stadium	Bangkok, Thailand	Decision	5	3:00
2013-03-15	Win	(Thailand) Palangtip Nor Sripung	Lumpinee Stadium	Bangkok, Thailand	Decision	5	3:00
2013-02-07	Loss	(Thailand) Tingtong Chor KoiyuhaIsuzu	Lumpinee Stadium	Bangkok, Thailand	Decision	5	3:00
2012-12-07	Loss	(Thailand) Tingtong Chor KoiyuhaIsuzu	Lumpinee Stadium	Bangkok, Thailand	Decision	5	3:00
For the vacant Lumpinee Stadium Super Bantamweight (122 lbs) title.
2012-11-09	Loss	(Thailand) Superbank Mor Ratanabandit	Lumpinee Stadium	Bangkok, Thailand	KO	1	
2012-09-12	Loss	(Thailand) Pettawee Sor Kittichai	Rajadamnern Stadium	Bangkok, Thailand	KO	5	
2012-07-20	Win	(Thailand) Luknimit Singklongsi	Rajadamnern Stadium	Bangkok, Thailand	KO	3	
2012-06-06	Loss	(Thailand) Superbank Mor Ratanabandit	Rajadamnern Stadium	Bangkok, Thailand	Decision	5	3:00
2012-04-30	Win	(Thailand) Yodtongthai Por.Telakun	Rajadamnern Stadium	Bangkok, Thailand	Decision	5	3:00
2012-02-28	Win	(Thailand) Pornsawan Lookprabath	Lumpinee Stadium	Bangkok, Thailand	Decision	5	3:00
2012-01-27	Win	(Thailand) Yodtongthai Por.Telakun	Lumpinee Stadium	Bangkok, Thailand	Decision	5	3:00
2011-12-03	Draw	(Thailand) Wuttichai Saksubin	Lumpinee Stadium	Bangkok, Thailand	Decision	5	3:00
2011-10-28	Loss	(Thailand) Yodwicha Banchamek	Lumpinee Stadium	Bangkok, Thailand	Decision	5	3:00
2011-08-30	Loss	(Thailand) Kaotam Lookprabaht	Rajadamnern Stadium	Bangkok, Thailand	Decision	5	3:00
2011-07-07	Draw	(Thailand) Kaotam Lookprabaht	Rajadamnern Stadium	Bangkok, Thailand	Decision	5	3:00
2011-06-03	Win	(Thailand) Pornsawan Lookprabath	Lumpinee Stadium	Bangkok, Thailand	Decision	5	3:00
2011-04-29	Win	(Thailand) Petpanomrung Kiatmuu9	Phetsupaphan, Lumpinee Stadium	Bangkok, Thailand	Decision	5	3:00
2011-03-15	Win	(Thailand) Chatchainoi Sitbenjama	Phetsupaphan, Lumpinee Stadium	Bangkok, Thailand	Decision	5	3:00
2011-01-22	Win	(Thailand) Wanchai Kiatphukam	Siam Omnoi Stadium	Samut Sakhon, Thailand	Decision	5	3:00
2010-04-16	Loss	(Thailand) Kaotam Lookprabaht	Lumpinee Stadium	Bangkok, Thailand	Decision	5	3:00
2010-03-02	Loss	(Thailand) Luknimit Singklongsi	Lumpinee Stadium	Bangkok, Thailand	Decision	5	3:00
2010-01-30	Loss	(Thailand) Denchiangkwan Lamtongkarnpat	Siam Omnoi Boxing Stadium	Samut Sakhon, Thailand	Decision	5	3:00
2009-12-12	Loss	(Thailand) Phetdam Sitbunmee	Omnoi Stadium	Samut Sakhon, Thailand	Decision	5	3:00
2009-10-31	Win	(Thailand) Awutlek W.Sunthonnon	Omnoi Stadium	Samut Sakhon, Thailand	Decision	5	3:00
2009-08-11	Loss	(Thailand) Kaotam Lookprabaht	Lumpinee Stadium	Bangkok, Thailand	Decision	5	3:00
2009-05-01	Loss	(Thailand) Saeksan Or. Kwanmuang	Lumpinee Stadium	Bangkok, Thailand	Decision	5	3:00
2009-04-03	Loss	(Thailand) Rungpet Wor.Sanprapai	Lumpinee Stadium	Bangkok, Thailand	Decision	5	3:00
2009-01-27	Loss	(Thailand) Rungruanglek Lukprabat	Lumpinee Stadium	Bangkok, Thailand	Decision	5	3:00
2008-12-02	Win	(Thailand) Rungphet Wor.Sangprapai	Lumpinee Stadium	Bangkok, Thailand	Decision	5	3:00
2008-11-07	Win	(Thailand) Kangwanlek Petchyindee	Lumpinee Stadium	Bangkok, Thailand	Decision	5	3:00
2008-09-19	Loss	(Thailand) Panomroonglek Kiatmuu9	Lumpinee Stadium	Bangkok, Thailand	Decision	5	3:00
2008-07-11	Loss	(Thailand) Khomphichai RiflonierSauna	Lumpinee Stadium	Bangkok, Thailand	Decision	5	3:00
2008-03-21	Loss	(Thailand) Rungpet Wor.Sanprapai	Lumpinee Stadium	Bangkok, Thailand	Decision	5	3:00
For the Lumpinee Stadium Flyweight (112 lbs) title.
2008-02-29	Loss	(Thailand) Rungpet Wor.Sanprapai	Lumpinee Stadium	Bangkok, Thailand	Decision	5	3:00
For the Lumpinee Stadium Flyweight (112 lbs) title.
2007-11-23	Win	(Thailand) Khomphichai RiflonierSauna	Lumpinee Stadium	Bangkok, Thailand	Decision	5	3:00
2007-09-14	Loss	(Thailand) Chatchai Sor.Thanayrong	Lumpinee Stadium	Bangkok, Thailand	Decision	5	3:00
For the Lumpinee Stadium Flyweight (112 lbs) title.
2007-06-08	Win	(Thailand) Silarit Sor.Suradej	Lumpinee Stadium	Bangkok, Thailand	Decision	5	3:00
Wins the Lumpinee Stadium Light Flyweight (108 lbs) title.
2007-05-01	Win	(Thailand) Wanchailek Kiatphukham	Lumpinee Stadium	Bangkok, Thailand	Decision	5	3:00
Legend: Win Loss Draw/No contest Notes
