= Phetwason Or.Daokrajai =

Thai Muay Thai fighter

Phetwason
- Born: Wasorn Srithana; 25 November 1997 (age 28); Yasothon Province, Thailand
- Other names: Phetwason Ansukhumvit (เพชรวสรณ์ อั๋นสุขุมวิท); Petchwasorn Boybangna (เพชรวสรณ์ บอยบางนา); Phetwason Por.Onnut (เพชรวสรณ์ ป.อ่อนนุชน)
- Nationality: Thai
- Height: 170 cm (5 ft 7 in)
- Weight: 60 kg (130 lb; 9.4 st)
- Stance: Orthodox
- Fighting out of: Bangkok, Thailand

Phetwason Or.Daokrajai (Thai: เพชรวสรณ์ อ.ดาวกระจาย) is a Thai Muay Thai fighter.

== Titles and accomplishments ==
- Rajadamnern Stadium
  - 2015 Rajadamnern Stadium 118 lbs Champion
  - 2017 Rajadamnern Stadium Fighter of the Year

== Fight record ==
Muay Thai Record
Date	Result	Opponent	Event	Location	Method	Round	Time
2022-03-30	Win	(Thailand) Yodtongthai Sor.Sommai	Palangmai, Rajadamnern Stadium	Bangkok, Thailand	Decision	5	3:00
2021-12-13	Loss	(Thailand) Chalam Parunchai	Kanla Krang Neung, Rajadamnern Stadium	Bangkok, Thailand	Decision	5	3:00
2021-10-02	Win	(Thailand) Theppabut Petchkiatpetch	Lumpinee GoSport Kiatpetch Fight, Lumpinee Stadium	Bangkok, Thailand	Decision	5	3:00
2021-04-03	Win	(Thailand) Songkom Bangkokalaiyon	Lumpinee TKO, Lumpinee Stadium	Bangkok, Thailand	TKO (Jumping knee)	3	
2019-07-24	Loss	(Thailand) Extra Rongsamak-OrBorJor.UdonThani	Petch Chao Phraya, Rajadamnern Stadium	Bangkok, Thailand	Decision	5	3:00
2019-06-20	Loss	(Thailand) Extra Rongsamak-OrBorJor.UdonThani	Sor.Sommai, Rajadamnern Stadium	Bangkok, Thailand	Decision	5	3:00
2019-05-16	Loss	(Thailand) Extra Sor.Siriluck	Chefboontham, Rajadamnern Stadium	Bangkok, Thailand	Decision	5	3:00
2019-01-28	Loss	(Thailand) Yamin PK.Saenchaimuaythaigym	Tor.Chaiwat, Rajadamnern Stadium	Bangkok, Thailand	Decision	5	3:00
2018-11-15	Win	(Thailand) Chanasuek Gor.Kampanat	Chefboontham, Rajadamnern Stadium	Bangkok, Thailand	Decision	5	3:00
2018-10-18	Draw	(Thailand) Superbank Mor Ratanabandit	Sor.Sommai, Rajadamnern Stadium	Bangkok, Thailand	Decision	5	3:00
2018-04-28	Loss	(Thailand) Kaonar P.K. Saenchai Muaythaigym	Phoenix 7 Phuket	Phuket, Thailand	Decision	5	3:00
For the Phoenix FC 130lbs title.
2018-02-20	Loss	(Thailand) Phet Utong Or. Kwanmuang	Lumpinee Stadium	Bangkok, Thailand	Decision	5	3:00
2018-01-25	Win	(Thailand) Kaonar P.K. Saenchai Muaythaigym	Rajadamnern Stadium	Bangkok, Thailand	Decision	5	3:00
2017-12-21	Win	(Thailand) Petchnamngam Or.Kwanmuang	Rajadamnern Stadium 72nd Anniversary Sor.Sommai + Chefboontham	Bangkok, Thailand	Decision	5	3:00
2017-11-15	Win	(Thailand) Superbank Mor Ratanabandit	Tor.Chaiwat, Rajadamnern Stadium	Bangkok, Thailand	Decision	5	3:00
2017-09-11	Win	(Thailand) Thepabut SitUudom	Sor.Sommai, Rajadamnern Stadium	Bangkok, Thailand	Decision	5	3:00
2017-08-10	Win	(Thailand) Petchthaksin Sor.Sommai	Bangrajan, Rajadamnern Stadium	Bangkok, Thailand	KO (Knees)	4	
2017-07-10	Win	(Thailand) Rangkhao Wor.Sangprapai	Rajadamnern Stadium	Bangkok, Thailand	Decision	5	3:00
Wins 1.8 million baht side-bet.
2017-04-27	Draw	(Thailand) Tawanchai P.K. Saenchai Muaythaigym	Lumpinee Stadium	Bangkok, Thailand	Decision	5	3:00
2017-03-02	Win	(Thailand) Petchdam Petchyindee Academy	Rajadamnern Stadium	Bangkok, Thailand	Decision	5	3:00
2017-01-26	Win	(Thailand) Mongkolchai Kwaitonggym	Rajadamnern Stadium	Bangkok, Thailand	Decision	5	3:00
2016-11-17	Win	(Thailand) Prakyphet Nitisamui	Rajadamnern Stadium	Bangkok, Thailand	KO (Punches)	2	
2016-09-22	Win	(Thailand) Weerachai Wor.Wiwattananon	Rajadamnern Stadium	Bangkok, Thailand	Decision	5	3:00
2016-07-18	Win	(Thailand) Weerachai Wor.Wiwattananon	Rajadamnern Stadium	Bangkok, Thailand	Decision	5	3:00
2016-06-24	Win	(Thailand) Sengdaw Phetsimuen	Lumpinee Stadium	Bangkok, Thailand	Decision	5	3:00
2016-05-30	Win	(Thailand) Sengdaw Phetsimuen	Rajadamnern Stadium	Bangkok, Thailand	Decision	5	3:00
2016-04-18	Loss	(Thailand) Sonnarai Sor.Sommai	Rajadamnern Stadium	Bangkok, Thailand	Decision	5	3:00
2016-03-23	Loss	(Thailand) Methee Sor.Jor.Toipaedriew	Rajadamnern Stadium	Bangkok, Thailand	Decision	5	3:00
2016-02-18	Win	(Thailand) Morakot Komsaimai	Rajadamnern Stadium	Bangkok, Thailand	Decision	5	3:00
2016-01-24	Win	(Thailand) Puenkon Diamond98	Rangsit Stadium	Rangsit, Thailand	Decision	5	3:00
2015-11-18	Win	(Thailand) Fonpet Chuwattana	Rajadamnern Stadium	Bangkok, Thailand	Decision	5	3:00
Wins Rajadamnern Stadium 118 lbs title.
2015-10-24	Win	(Thailand) Thanai-K Lukkaokwang	Montree Studio	Bangkok, Thailand	Decision	5	3:00
2015-09-28	Win	(Thailand) Nichao Suvitgym	Rajadamnern Stadium	Bangkok, Thailand	Decision	5	3:00
2015-08-27	Loss	(Thailand) Nichao Suvitgym	Rajadamnern Stadium	Bangkok, Thailand	Decision	5	3:00
2015-08-05	Win	(Thailand) Nongbeer Sor.Jor.Vichitpaedriew	Rajadamnern Stadium	Bangkok, Thailand	Decision	5	3:00
2015-07-08	Win	(Thailand) Kompatak SinbiMuayThai	Rajadamnern Stadium	Bangkok, Thailand	Decision	5	3:00
2015-06-15	Win	(Thailand) Pakorn Sor.Kingrat	Rajadamnern Stadium	Bangkok, Thailand	KO	4	
2015-04-08	Win	(Thailand) Yokmorakot Wor.Sangprapai	Rajadamnern Stadium	Bangkok, Thailand	Decision	5	3:00
2015-02-06	Loss	(Thailand) Yothin FA Group	Lumpinee Stadium	Bangkok, Thailand	Decision	5	3:00
2015-01-11	Loss	(Thailand) Kunhan Chor.Hapayak	Rangsit Stadium	Rangsit, Thailand	Decision	5	3:00
Legend: Win Loss Draw/No contest Notes
