= Singtongnoi Por.Telakun =

Thai Muay Thai fighter

Singtongnoi Por. Telakun
- Born: Bancha Fonkratok; June 5, 1980 (age 46); Nakhon Ratchasima, Thailand
- Other names: Singthongnoi Sitsaengaroon (สิงห์ทองน้อย ศิษย์แสงอรุณ)
- Height: 168 cm (5 ft 6 in)
- Division: Featherweight; Super Featherweight
- Style: Muay Thai (???)
- Stance: Orthodox
- Team: Evolve MMA
- Years active: c. 1990–2019

Professional boxing record
- Total: 1
- Losses: 1

Kickboxing record
- Total: 304
- Wins: 222
- Losses: 82

Other information
- Boxing record from BoxRec

Bancha Fonkratok (Thai: ???; born June 5, 1980), known professionally as Singtongnoi Por. Telakun (Thai: สิงห์ทองน้อย ป.เตละกุล) is a Thai retired Muay Thai fighter. He is a former Lumpinee Stadium champion and WMC champion.

== Biography and career ==
Singtongnoi started training in Muay Thai at 10 years old with his dad, who was a fighter himself. He quickly went on to fight for a few hundred baht to help his family out of poverty.

In 2015, after a long career which saw him win a Lumpinee title, Singtongnoi retired following an injury sustained in his last fight. He went back to live in the countryside and quickly accepted an offer from Evolve to teach Muay Thai in Singapore alongside former Muay Thai champions Nong-O Gaiyanghadao, Dejdamrong Sor Amnuaysirichoke, and Sagetdao Petpayathai.

In August 2016 doctors diagnosed him with cancer. Singtongnoi overcame the disease and saw it as a new start in his life, prompting him to come out of retirement and start fighting again, this time in the ONE Championship organization in 2018. In his comeback, Singtongnoi faced Joseph Lasiri at ONE Championship: Unstoppable Dreams in a ONE Super Series Muay Thai match. He won the fight by TKO. Next, he faced Masahide Kudo under ONE Super Series kickboxing rules at ONE Championship: Kingdom of Heroes in Bangkok on October 6, 2018. He would go on to win by unanimous decision.

Singtongnoi began 2019 on a two-fight losing streak, first losing to Savvas Michael at ONE Championship: Warriors of Light on May 10, 2019 by unanimous decision. Then, at ONE Championship: Immortal Triumph on September 6, 2019, he lost to Kohei "Momotaro" Kodera by KO in just 41 seconds of the first round, marking the fastest knockout in ONE Super Series history. This record was later shattered by Capitan Petchyindee Academy, who knocked out Petchtanong Banchamek in just 6 seconds at ONE Championship: A New Breed 3 on September 18, 2020.

== Titles and accomplishments ==
- Lumpinee Stadium
  - 2010 Lumpinee Stadium Featherweight (126 lbs) Champion
- World Muay Thai Council
  - 2010 WMC Muay Thai World Featherweight (126 lbs) Champion
- Rajadamnern Stadium
  - 2010 Rajadamnern Stadium Fighter of the Year
  - 2012 Rajadamnern Stadium Fight of the Year (on December 22, 2011 vs Saeksan Or. Kwanmuang)

== Fight record ==
222 Wins , 82 Losses
Date	Result	Opponent	Event	Location	Method	Round	Time
2019-09-06	Loss	(Japan) Kohei "Momotaro" Kodera	ONE Championship: Immortal Triumph	Ho Chi Minh City, Vietnam	KO (Punches and Elbows)	1	0:41
2019-05-10	Loss	(Cyprus) Savvas Michael	ONE Championship: Warriors Of Light	Bangkok, Thailand	Decision (Unanimous)	3	3:00
2018-10-06	Win	(Japan) Masahide Kudo	ONE Championship: Kingdom of Heroes	Bangkok, Thailand	Decision (Unanimous)	3	3:00
2018-05-18	Win	(Italy) Joseph Lasiri	ONE Championship: Unstoppable Dreams	Kallang, Singapore	TKO (Doctor Stoppage)	2	2:36
2015-03-22	Win	(Japan) Yosuke Morii	WPMF JAPAN×REBELS SUK WEERASAKRECK FAIRTEX	Tokyo, Japan	KO (High Kick)	5	2:40
2015-01-25	Loss	(Thailand) Yokwittaya Paranchai	Chalong Boxing Stadium	Phuket, Thailand	TKO (Knee)	4	
2014-10-08	Loss	(Thailand) Phet Utong Or. Kwanmuang	Rajadamnern Stadium	Bangkok, Thailand	TKO	3	
2014-09-21	Draw	(Japan) Genji Umeno	M-FIGHT Suk WEERASAKRECK VII	Tokyo, Japan	Decision	5	3:00
2014-07-24	Loss	(Thailand) Yokwittaya Petchsimuen	Chaopraya, Rajadamnern Stadium	Bangkok, Thailand	Decision	5	3:00
2014-06-15	Win	(Japan) Taison Maeguchi	M-FIGHT Suk WEERASAKRECK VI	Tokyo, Japan	KO	2	2:27
2014-05-07	Win	(Thailand) Thanonchai Thanakorngym	Rajadamnern Stadium	Bangkok, Thailand	Decision	5	3:00
2014-02-28	Loss	(Thailand) Petpanomrung Kiatmuu9	Lumpinee Champion Krikkrai, Lumpinee Stadium	Bangkok, Thailand	Decision	5	3:00
For the Thailand (PAT) Super Featherweight (130 lbs) title.
2014-02-07	Win	(Thailand) Phetmorakot Petchyindee Academy	Lumpinee Stadium	Bangkok, Thailand	Decision	5	3:00
2013-11-06	Loss	(Thailand) Auisiewpor Sujibhamikiao	Rajadamnern Stadium	Bangkok, Thailand	Decision	5	3:00
2013-10-08	Draw	(Thailand) Auisiewpor Sujibhamikiao	Lumpinee Stadium	Bangkok, Thailand	Decision	5	3:00
2013-08-05	Draw	(Thailand) Superbank Mor Ratanabandit	Rajadamnern Stadium	Bangkok, Thailand	Decision	5	3:00
2013-06-03	Loss	(Thailand) Superbank Mor Ratanabandit	Lumpinee Stadium	Bangkok, Thailand	Decision	5	3:00
2013-02-21	Loss	(Thailand) Saeksan Or. Kwanmuang	Rajadamnern Stadium	Bangkok, Thailand	Decision	5	3:00
2012-12-24	Loss	(Thailand) Kongsak Saenchaimuaythaigym	Rajadamnern Stadium	Bangkok, Thailand	Decision	5	3:00
2012-11-30	Win	(Thailand) Saeksan Or. Kwanmuang	Lumpinee Stadium	Bangkok, Thailand	Decision	5	3:00
2012-11-09	Loss	(Thailand) Saeksan Or. Kwanmuang	Lumpinee Stadium	Bangkok, Thailand	Decision	5	3:00
2012-10-11	Win	(Thailand) Yokvitaya Phetsimean	Rajadamnern Stadium	Bangkok, Thailand	Decision	5	3:00
2012-09-12	Win	(Thailand) Kaimukkao Por.Thairongruangkamai	Lumpinee Stadium	Bangkok, Thailand	TKO (Elbow)	3	
2012-06-26	Draw	(Thailand) Yodwicha Por Boonsit	Lumpinee Stadium	Bangkok, Thailand	Draw	5	3:00
2012-02-28	Loss	(Thailand) Mongkolchai Kwaitonggym	Lumpinee Stadium	Bangkok, Thailand	TKO (Doctor Stoppage)		
2012-01-26	Loss	(Thailand) Jomthong Chuwattana	Wansongchai, Rajadamnern Stadium	Bangkok, Thailand	Decision	5	3:00
2011-12-22	Win	(Thailand) Saeksan Or. Kwanmuang	Rajadamnern Stadium	Bangkok, Thailand	Decision	5	3:00
2011-08-18	Win	(Thailand) Wanchalerm Chor.Chunkamon	Rajadamnern Stadium	Bangkok, Thailand	Decision	5	3:00
2011-06-02	Win	(Thailand) Noppakrit Namplatahoimouk	Rajadamnern Stadium	Bangkok, Thailand	Decision	5	3:00
2011-03-15	Loss	(Thailand) Phetek Kiatyongyut	Lumpinee Stadium	Bangkok, Thailand	Decision	5	3:00
2011-02-21	Loss	(Thailand) Kongsak Saenchaimuaythaigym	Rajadamnern Stadium	Bangkok, Thailand	Decision	5	3:00
2011-01-20	Loss	(Thailand) Pakorn PKSaenchaimuaythaigym	Rajadamnern Stadium	Bangkok, Thailand	TKO (Punches)	2	
2010-12-16	Win	(Thailand) Kongnakornban Sor. Kitrungrot	Rajadamnern Stadium	Bangkok, Thailand	Decision	5	3:00
2010-11-02	Win	(Thailand) Sam-A Gaiyanghadao	Lumpinee Stadium	Bangkok, Thailand	Decision	5	3:00
2010-10-05	Win	(Thailand) Pornsanae Sitmonchai	Lumpinee Stadium	Bangkok, Thailand	Decision	5	3:00
Wins the Lumpinee Stadium Featherweight (126 lbs) title and the vacant WMC World 126 lbs title.
2010-09-07	Win	(Thailand) Jomthong Chuwattana	Petsupapan, Lumpinee Stadium	Bangkok, Thailand	Decision	5	3:00
2010-08-04	Loss	(Thailand) Fahmai Skindewgym	Sor.Sommai Rajadamnern Stadium	Bangkok, Thailand	Decision	5	3:00
2010-06-10	Win	(Thailand) Jomthong Chuwattana	Onesongchai, Rajadamnern Stadium	Bangkok, Thailand	Decision	5	3:00
2010-02-11	Win	(Thailand) Jomthong Chuwattana	Petthongkam, Rajadamnern Stadium	Bangkok, Thailand	Decision	5	3:00
2010-01-13	Win	(Thailand) Manasak Sitniwat	Onesongchai NBT, Rajadamnern Stadium	Bangkok, Thailand	KO	3	
2009-11-26	Loss	(Thailand) Pettawee Sor Kittichai	One Songchai	Bangkok, Thailand	Decision	5	3:00
2009-10-08	Win	(Thailand) Manasak Sitniwat	Palangnum, Rajadamnern Stadium	Bangkok, Thailand	Decision	5	3:00
2009-08-06	Loss	(Thailand) Sittisak Petpayathai	Rajadamnern vs Lumpinee Rajadamnern Stadium	Bangkok, Thailand	Decision	5	3:00
2009-07-03	Loss	(Thailand) Nong-O Kaiyanghadaogym	Lumpinee vs Rajadamnern Special	Bangkok, Thailand	Decision	5	3:00
2009-06-08	Win	(Thailand) Pakorn PKSaenchaimuaythaigym	One Songchai, Rajadamnern Stadium	Bangkok, Thailand	Decision	5	3:00
2009-05-09	Win	(Thailand) Phet-Ek Sitjaopho	One Songchai	Yasothon Province, Thailand	Decision	5	3:00
2009-03-12	Win	(Thailand) Petchtho Sitjaopho	OneSongchai, Rajadamnern Stadium	Bangkok, Thailand	Decision	5	3:00
2009-03-06	Loss	(Thailand) Pettawee Sor Kittichai	One Songchai	Maha Sarakham Province, Thailand	Decision	5	3:00
2009-01-14	Win	(Thailand) Pettawee Sor Kittichai	One Songchai Rajadamnern Stadium	Bangkok, Thailand	Decision	5	3:00
2008-12-18	Win	(Thailand) Nongwax Petchrachat	Onesongchai, Rajadamnern Stadium	Bangkok, Thailand	Decision	5	3:00
2008-11-23	Draw	(Thailand) Sittisak Petpayathai	Channel 7 Stadium	Bangkok, Thailand	Decision	5	3:00
2008-10-13	Draw	(Thailand) Nong-O Kaiyanghadaogym	Sor Sommai, Rajadamnern Stadium	Bangkok, Thailand	Decision draw	5	3:00
2008-08-28	Loss	(Thailand) Bovy Sor Udomson	Onesongchai, Rajadamnern Stadium	Bangkok, Thailand	TKO	3	
2008-07-21	Win	(Thailand) Phet-Ek Sitjaopho	Phettongkam, Rajadamnern Stadium	Bangkok, Thailand	Decision	5	3:00
2008-05-01	Loss	(Thailand) Phetto Sitjaopho	Daorungchujarern, Rajadamnern Stadium	Bangkok, Thailand	Decision	5	3:00
2008-04-10	Win	(Thailand) Petchsongwan Sitniwat	Onesongchai, Rajadamnern Stadium	Bangkok, Thailand	Decision	5	3:00
2008-03-08	Win	(Thailand) Phet-Ek Sitjaopho	Onesongchai	Sakon Nakhon Province, Thailand	Decision	5	3:00
2008-01-21	Win	(Thailand) Phet-Ek Sitjaopho	Rajadamnern Stadium	Bangkok, Thailand	Decision	5	3:00
2007-12-19	Win	(Thailand) Phetsanguan Sitniwat	Rajadamnern Stadium	Bangkok, Thailand	Decision	5	3:00
2007-11-24	Win	(Thailand) Thongsuk Sor.Damrongrit	One Songchai	Thailand	KO	3	
2007-07-16	Loss	(Thailand) Pettawee Sor Kittichai	OneSongchai, Rajadamnern Stadium	Bangkok, Thailand	Decision	5	3:00
2007-06-25	Loss	(Thailand) Pettawee Sor Kittichai	OneSongchai, Rajadamnern Stadium	Bangkok, Thailand	Decision	5	3:00
2007-03-08	Loss	(Thailand) Anuwat Kaewsamrit	Onesongchai, Rajadamnern Stadium	Bangkok, Thailand	Decision	5	3:00
2007-02-05	Win	(Thailand) Puja Sor.Suwanee	Onesongchai, Rajadamnern Stadium	Bangkok, Thailand	Decision	5	3:00
2006-12-28	Loss	(Thailand) Ronnachai Naratreekul	Rajadamnern Stadium	Bangkok, Thailand	Decision	5	3:00
2006-10-19	Loss	(Thailand) Anuwat Kaewsamrit	Onesongchai, Rajadamnern Stadium	Bangkok, Thailand	TKO	3	
For the 126lbs WBC Muay Thai World title.
2006-09-04	Draw	(Thailand) Anuwat Kaewsamrit	Daorungchujaroen, Rajadamnern Stadium	Bangkok, Thailand	Decision draw	5	3:00
For the vacant Rajadamnern Stadium Featherweight (126 lbs) title.
2006-07-28	Win	(Thailand) Rittidej Naratrikul	Khunsuk Trakunyang, Lumpinee Stadium	Bangkok, Thailand	Decision	5	3:00
2006-06-16	Win	(Thailand) Petchthaksin Sor.Thammaphet	Lumpinee Stadium	Bangkok, Thailand	Decision	5	3:00
2006-05-08	Loss	(Thailand) Bovy Sor Udomson	Wansongchai, Rajadamnern Stadium	Bangkok, Thailand	Decision	5	3:00
2006-04-06	Win	(Thailand) Bovy Sor Udomson	Wansongchai, Rajadamnern Stadium	Bangkok, Thailand	Decision	5	3:00
2006-03-06	Loss	(Thailand) Jomthong Chuwattana	Wansongchai, Rajadamnern Stadium	Bangkok, Thailand	Decision	5	3:00
2005-11-17	Win	(Thailand) Lerdsila Chumpairtour	Daorungchujarean, Rajadamnern Stadium	Bangkok, Thailand	Decision	5	3:00
2005-10-	Win	(Thailand) Dejsak Sor.Thammaphet	Rajadamnern Stadium	Bangkok, Thailand	Decision	5	3:00
2005-09-29	Win	(Thailand) Saengarthit SasiprapaGym	Rajadamnern Stadium	Bangkok, Thailand	Decision	5	3:00
2005-09-05	Win	(Thailand) Watcharachai Kaewsamrit	Rajadamnern Stadium	Bangkok, Thailand	Decision	5	3:00
2005-08-04	Loss	(Thailand) Jomthong Chuwattana	Daorungchujarean, Rajadamnern Stadium	Bangkok, Thailand	Decision	5	3:00
2005-	Win	(Thailand) Luktong Sor.Ploenchit		Sanam Luang, Thailand	Decision	5	3:00
2005-	Win	(Thailand) Surasing Nongkeepahuyuth	Rajadamnern Stadium	Bangkok, Thailand	Decision	5	3:00
2005-	Win	(Thailand) Jomthong Chuwattana	Rajadamnern Stadium	Bangkok, Thailand	Decision	5	3:00
2005-	Loss	(Thailand) Sansak Tor.Silachai	Omnoi Stadium	Samut Sakhon, Thailand	Decision	5	3:00
2005-	Loss	(Thailand) Sittisak Sit.Or	Omnoi Stadium	Samut Sakhon, Thailand	Decision	5	3:00
2003-08-17	Loss	(Thailand) Tuanthong Chatchatree	Lumpinee Stadium	Bangkok, Thailand	Decision	5	3:00
2003-07-27	Win	(Thailand) Petchsinil Sor.Sakulphan	Rajadamnern Stadium	Bangkok, Thailand	Decision	5	3:00
2003-05-05	Win	(Thailand) Singphayak Ketrangsri	Lumpinee Stadium	Bangkok, Thailand	Decision	5	3:00
2003-04-17	Win	(Thailand) Chaoyangyai Sor.Chaicharoen	Lumpinee Stadium	Bangkok, Thailand	Decision	5	3:00
2002-05-20	Loss	(Thailand) Panomtuanlek Sor.Siripong		Bangkok, Thailand	Decision	5	3:00
2000-07-09	Loss	(Thailand) Rattanasak Kratingdek	Samrong Stadium	Thailand	Decision	5	3:00
2000-04-29	Loss	(Thailand) Jaroensap Don Golf Service	Lumpinee Stadium	Bangkok, Thailand	Decision	5	3:00
1999-08-07	Win	(Thailand) Jaroensap Don Golf Service	Lumpinee Stadium	Bangkok, Thailand	Decision	5	3:00
Legend: Win Loss Draw/No contest Notes
