= Pentai Singpatong =

Thai Muay Thai fighter

Pentai
- Born: October 7, 1989 (age 37); Ko Lanta district, Krabi province, Thailand
- Other names: Shocker Saengsaengpanpla (ช๊อคเกอร์ แสงสว่างพันธุ์ปลา); Penthai Sitnumnoi (เป็นไท ศิษย์หนุ่มน้อย); Pentai Revolution
- Height: 161 cm (5 ft 3 in)
- Weight: 51 kg (112 lb; 8.0 st)
- Fighting out of: Phuket, Thailand
- Team: Singpatong; Revolution Phuket Gym

Other information
- Occupation: Muay Thai trainer

Pentai Singpatong (Thai: เป็นไท สิงห์ป่าตอง) is a Thai Muay Thai fighter.

== Career ==
Starting on April 24, 2014, Pentai went on a three fights losing streak, during which he lost his Lumpinee Stadium 112 lbs title against Saknarinnoi Or.Aunsuwan. Pentai broke the losing streak when he faced Sarawut Phithakpabhadang on September 28, 2014, at the Channel 7 Stadium for the 112 lbs belt and a 100,000 baht side-bet. Pentai won the fight by decision.

Penthai became a trainer in 2014, working at Evolve MMA in Singapore and later at Revolution Phuket Gym in Thailand. He came out of retirement for multiple fights including a WBC Muay Thai World title fight. On May 13, 2023, he faced Corey Nicholson for the vacant Bantamweight World title. He lost the fight by knockout in the fourth round.

== Titles and accomplishments ==
- Channel 7 Boxing Stadium
  - 2011 Channel 7 Stadium Light Flyweight (108 lbs) Champion
  - 2014 Channel 7 Stadium Flyweight (112 lbs) Champion
- Lumpinee Stadium
  - 2012 Lumpinee Stadium Fight of the Year (vs Wanchalong Sitsornong)
  - 2013 Lumpinee Stadium Flyweight (112 lbs) Champion
- World Boxing Council Muay Thai
  - 2022 WBC Muay Thai International Bantamweight (53.5 kg) Champion

== Fight record ==
Muay Thai Record
| Date | Result | Opponent | Event | Location | Method | Round | Time |
|---|---|---|---|---|---|---|---|
| 2023-05-13 | Loss | (Australia) Corey Nicholson | Muay Thai League 7 | Australia | KO (Left cross) | 4 | |
For the vacant WBC Muay Thai World Bantamweight (53.5kg) title.
| 2022-05-28 | Win | (United Kingdom) Ellis Barboza | Muay Thai League 4 | Australia | Decision (Unanimous) | 5 | 3:00 |
Wins the vacant WBC Muay Thai International Bantamweight (53.5kg) title.
| 2021-04-04 | Loss | (Brazil) Dionatha Tobias | Muay Thai Superchamp | Bangkok, Thailand | Decision | 3 | 3:00 |
| 2017-12-10 | Win | (Russia) Egor Ishuk | | Russia | Decision (Unanimous) | 5 | 3:00 |
Wins GPRO Muay Thai title.
| 2014-12-12 | Loss | (Thailand) Puenkonlek Nakhonsi | Lumpinee Stadium | Bangkok, Thailand | Decision | 5 | 3:00 |
| 2014-09-28 | Win | (Thailand) Sarawut Phithakpabhadang | Channel 7 Stadium | Bangkok, Thailand | Decision | 5 | 3:00 |
Wins the Channel 7 Stadium 112 lbs title
| 2014-08-11 | Loss | (Thailand) Sarawut Phithakpabhadang | Jitmuangnon, Rajadamnern Stadium | Bangkok, Thailand | Decision | 5 | 3:00 |
| 2014-06-06 | Loss | (Thailand) Saknarinnoi Or.Aunsuwan | Kiatpetch Krikkrai, Lumpinee Stadium | Bangkok, Thailand | Decision | 5 | 3:00 |
Loses the Lumpinee Stadium 112 lbs title
| 2014-04-24 | Loss | (Thailand) Chaisiri Sakniranrat | Jitmuangnon, Rajadamnern Stadium | Bangkok, Thailand | Decision | 5 | 3:00 |
| 2014-03-14 | Win | (Thailand) Talayhod TigerMuayThai | Klong Dao stadium | Ko Lanta Yai, Thailand | Decision | 5 | 3:00 |
| 2013-11-19 | Loss | (Thailand) Jomhod Eminentair | Lumpinee Stadium | Bangkok, Thailand | Decision | 5 | 3:00 |
| 2013-10-18 | Loss | (Thailand) Yangthon Sitpanon | Kiatpetch, Lumpinee Stadium | Bangkok, Thailand | Decision | 5 | 3:00 |
| 2013-09-06 | Win | (Thailand) Yangthon Sitpanon | Lumpinee Champion Krikkrai, Lumpinee Stadium | Bangkok, Thailand | KO (Left hook) | 4 | |
Wins the vacant Lumpinee Stadium 112 lbs title
| 2013-07-07 | Loss | (Thailand) Ruengsak Sitniwat | Channel 7 Stadium | Bangkok, Thailand | KO | 3 | |
| 2013-04-28 | Loss | (Thailand) Jomhod Eminentair | Bangla Stadium | Phuket, Thailand | Decision | 5 | 3:00 |
| 2013-02-05 | Loss | (Thailand) Jomhod Eminentair | Lumpinee Stadium | Bangkok, Thailand | Decision | 5 | 3:00 |
| 2012-11-06 | Loss | (Thailand) Wanchalong Sitsornong | Lumpinee Stadium | Bangkok, Thailand | KO | 4 | |
| 2012-10-05 | Win | (Thailand) Jomhod Eminentair | Kiatpetch, Lumpinee Stadium | Bangkok, Thailand | Decision | 5 | 3:00 |
| 2012-08-11 | Win | (Thailand) Jomhod Eminentair | | Thailand | Decision | 5 | 3:00 |
| 2012-03-09 | Win | (Thailand) Mondam Sor.Weerapon | Lumpinee Champion Krikkrai, Lumpinee Stadium | Bangkok, Thailand | TKO | 2 | |
Wins the vacant Lumpinee Stadium 112 lbs title
| 2012-02-10 | Loss | (Thailand) Karn Kor.Kumpanart | Kiatpetch, Lumpinee Stadium | Bangkok, Thailand | Decision | 5 | 3:00 |
| 2011-09-27 | Win | (Thailand) Saengmorakot Teemuangloei | Petchyindee, Lumpinee Stadium | Bangkok, Thailand | KO | 2 | |
| 2011-08-09 | Win | (Thailand) Kusakomnoi Sitphet-Ubon | Kiatpetch, Lumpinee Stadium | Bangkok, Thailand | TKO | 3 | |
| 2011-05-30 | Loss | (Thailand) Palangpol Chuwattana | Rajadamnern Stadium | Bangkok, Thailand | KO (Elbow) | | |
| 2011-05-05 | Win | (Thailand) Khunsuk P.N.Gym | Daorungchujaroen, Rajadamnern Stadium | Bangkok, Thailand | TKO | 3 | |
| 2011-01-09 | Win | (Thailand) Kengkla Por.Pekko | Channel 7 Boxing Stadium | Bangkok, Thailand | Decision | 5 | 3:00 |
Wins the Channel 7 Stadium 108 lbs title
| 2010-12-12 | Loss | (Thailand) Kengkla Por.Pekko | Channel 7 Boxing Stadium | Bangkok, Thailand | Decision | 5 | 3:00 |
| 2010-11-10 | Win | (Thailand) Methee Kiatpratoom | Rajadamnern Stadium | Bangkok, Thailand | KO (Left cross) | 2 | |
| 2010-08-27 | Win | (Thailand) Kusakornnoi Sit Phet-Ubon | Khunsuktrakunyang, Lumpinee Stadium | Bangkok, Thailand | KO | 3 | |
| 2010-07-28 | Win | (Thailand) Montreelek Aor.Watcharapong | Wanpadet, Rajadamnern Stadium | Bangkok, Thailand | KO | 2 | |
| 2010-03-21 | Win | (Thailand) Sirimongkol Wor.Sunthonnon | Channel 7 Stadium | Bangkok, Thailand | KO | 4 | |
| 2010-02-21 | Win | (Thailand) Sirimongkol Wor.Sunthonnon | Channel 7 Stadium | Bangkok, Thailand | TKO (Referee stoppage) | 3 | |
| 2009-08-31 | Win | (Thailand) Saksit Sritevet | Sor.Sommai, Rajadamnern Stadium | Bangkok, Thailand | Decision | 5 | 3:00 |
| 2009-01-30 | Win | (Thailand) Nongbert Aewtamsang | Saengmorakot, Lumpinee Stadium | Bangkok, Thailand | KO | 4 | |
Legend: Win Loss Draw/No contest Notes
