= Wanchalong PK.Saenchai =

Thai Muay Thai fighter

- Born: Thaworn Sudchanhan; November 11, 1986 (age 39); Kalasin, Thailand
- Other names: Wanchalong Sitsornong (วันฉลอง ศิษย์ซ้อน้อง)
- Nationality: Thai
- Height: 160 cm (5 ft 3 in)
- Weight: 53.5 kg (118 lb; 8.42 st)
- Style: Muay Tae
- Stance: Southpaw
- Fighting out of: Bangkok, Thailand

Wanchalong (วันฉลอง) is a Thai Muay Thai fighter.

== Biography and career ==
Wanchalong started boxing at 8 years old in small camp near his village. He later moved to the Sitsornong camp situated in Chachoengsao. Wanchalong stayed at this camp for most of his career before moving to the Bangkok gym PK.Saenchai in 2014.

== Titles and accomplishments ==
- Lumpinee Stadium
  - 2009 Lumpinee Stadium 108 lbs Champion
  - 2011 Lumpinee Stadium 115 lbs Champion (defended once)
  - 2013 Lumpinee Stadium 115 lbs Champion (defended once)
  - 2016 Lumpinee Stadium 115 lbs Champion
  - 2012 Lumpinee Stadium Fight of the Year (vs Pentai Singpatong)
  - 2013 Lumpinee Stadium Fight of the Year (vs Yokphet Sompongmataput on Feb 5)
  - 2014 Lumpinee Stadium Fight of the Year (vs Chaisiri Sakniranrat)
  - 2015 Lumpinee Stadium Fight of the Year (vs Jomhod Eminentair)
- Channel 7 Stadium
  - 2010 Channel 7 Boxing Stadium 112 lbs Champion
  - 2013 Channel 7 Boxing Stadium 115 lbs Champion
  - 2015 Channel 7 Boxing Stadium 115 lbs Champion (defended once)
  - 2019 Channel 7 Stadium 118 lbs Champion

== Fight record ==
Muay Thai Record
Date	Result	Opponent	Event	Location	Method	Round	Time
2022-07-01	Draw	(United States) K.J FA Group	Muay Thai Fighter X	Bangkok, Thailand	Decision	5	3:00
2021-03-14	Loss	(Thailand) Seeoui Singmawynn	Channel 7 Boxing Stadium	Bangkok, Thailand	Decision	5	3:00
2020-10-26	Loss	(Thailand) PetchAmnat Sawansangmanja	Hatyai International Boxing Stadium	Songkhla province, Thailand	Decision	5	3:00
2020-07-12	Loss	(Thailand) Suesat Paeminburi	Channel 7 Boxing Stadium	Bangkok, Thailand	KO	4	
Loses the Channel 7 Boxing Stadium 118 lbs title
2020-02-09	Loss	(Thailand) Petchrapa Sor.Sopit	Srithammaracha + Kiatpetch Super Fight	Nakhon Si Thammarat, Thailand	Decision	5	3:00
2019-10-05	Loss	(Thailand) Petphusang KelaSport	Suek Muay Thai Vithee Isaan Tai	Buriram, Thailand	Decision	5	3:00
2019-07-21	Win	(Thailand) Petphusang KelaSport	Channel 7 Boxing Stadium	Bangkok, Thailand	Decision	5	3:00
Wins vacant Channel 7 Boxing Stadium 118 lbs title
2019-05-29	Win	(Thailand) Puenkon Tor.Surat	Singmawin Rajadamnern Stadium	Bangkok, Thailand	KO (Left high kick)	4	
2019-02-24	Loss	(Thailand) Petphusang KelaSport	Channel 7 Boxing Stadium	Bangkok, Thailand	Decision	5	3:00
2018-12-26	Loss	(Thailand) Diesellek Wor.Wanchai	Rajadamnern Stadium	Bangkok, Thailand	Decision	5	3:00
2018-10-14	Win	(Thailand) Petphusang KelaSport	Channel 7 Boxing Stadium	Bangkok, Thailand	Decision	5	3:00
2018-09-09	Loss	(France) Arthur Meyer	Super Champ	Bangkok, Thailand	Decision	5	3:00
2018-07-06	Win	(Thailand) Jakdao Witsanugonlagan	Samui Super Fight	Koh Samui, Thailand	Decision	5	3:00
2018-05-27	Loss	(Thailand) Jomhod Eminentair	Channel 7 Boxing Stadium	Bangkok, Thailand	TKO	2	
Loses Channel 7 Boxing Stadium 115 lbs title
2018-04-10	Loss	(Thailand) Sprinter Pangkongprab	Kiatpetch Super Fight Roadshow + Sawansangmanja	Khon Kaen, Thailand	Decision	5	3:00
2018-02-13	Loss	(Thailand) Jakdao Witsanugonlagan	Lumpinee Stadium	Thailand	Decision	5	3:00
2017-12-27	Loss	(Thailand) Boonlung Khongsuanpu Resort	Rajadamnern Stadium	Bangkok, Thailand	Decision	5	3:00
2017-11-09	Win	(Thailand) Boonlung Khongsuanpu Resort	Rajadamnern Stadium	Bangkok, Thailand	Decision	5	3:00
2017-09-03	Loss	(Thailand) Saknarinnoi Or Uansuwan	Channel 7 Boxing Stadium	Bangkok, Thailand	Decision	5	3:00
2017-06-17	Loss	(Japan) Eisaku Ogasawara	KNOCK OUT vol.3	Tokyo, Japan	TKO (Corner Stoppage)	5	1:10
2017-06-07	Win	(Thailand) Puenkon Tor.Surat	Rajadamnern Stadium	Bangkok, Thailand	Decision	5	3:00
2017-03-28	Win	(Thailand) Ronachai Tor.Ramintra	Lumpinee Stadium	Bangkok, Thailand	Decision	5	3:00
2017-02-19	Win	(Thailand) Ronachai Tor.Ramintra	Channel 7 Boxing Stadium	Bangkok, Thailand	Decision	5	3:00
Defends Channel 7 Boxing Stadium 115 lbs title
2017-01-24	Win	(Thailand) Achanai Petchyindee	Lumpinee Stadium	Bangkok, Thailand	Decision	5	3:00
2016-12-05	Loss	(Japan) Tenshin Nasukawa	Knock Out Vol. 0	Tokyo, Japan	KO (spinning back kick)	1	0:38
2016-11-15	Win	(Thailand) Sprinter Pangkongpap	Lumpinee Stadium	Bangkok, Thailand	Decision	5	3:00
2016-09-30	Loss	(Thailand) Yothin FA Group	Lumpinee Stadium	Bangkok, Thailand	Decision	5	3:00
2016-08-05	Win	(Thailand) Kengkla Por.Pekko		Hat Yai, Thailand	Decision	5	3:00
2016-07-01	Loss	(Thailand) Jomhod Eminentair	80th Anniversary Commemoration Stadium	Nakhon Ratchasima, Thailand	Decision	5	3:00
2016-06-03	Win	(Thailand) Kengkla Por.Pekko	Lumpinee Stadium	Bangkok, Thailand	Decision	5	3:00
Wins Lumpinee 115 lbs title
2016-05-02	Win	(Thailand) Kaokarat Jitmuangnon	Rajadamnern Stadium	Bangkok, Thailand	Decision	5	3:00
2016-04-08	Loss	(Thailand) Jomhod Eminentair		Khon Kaen, Thailand	Decision	5	3:00
2016-03-16	Loss	(Thailand) Kengkla Por.Pekko		Phra Nakhon Si Ayutthaya, Thailand	Decision	5	3:00
For Thailand 115 lbs title
2016-02-23	Win	(Thailand) Kaokarat Jitmuangnon	Lumpinee Stadium	Bangkok, Thailand	Decision	5	3:00
2016-01-29	Win	(Thailand) Fahseetong Sor.Jor Piek-U-Thai	Lumpinee Stadium	Bangkok, Thailand	KO	4	
2015-11-29	Win	(Thailand) Jomhod Eminentair	Lumpinee Stadium	Bangkok, Thailand	Decision	5	3:00
Wins Channel 7 Boxing Stadium 115 lbs title
2015-10-13	Loss	(Thailand) Jomhod Eminentair	Lumpinee Stadium	Bangkok, Thailand	Decision	5	3:00
2015-09-19	Win	(Japan) Yu Wor.Wanchai	GRACHAN19×BOM IX.5	Tokyo, Japan	KO (Left Middle Kick)	2	1:29
2015-08-07	Win	(Thailand) Saknarinnoi Or Uansuwan	Lumpinee Stadium	Bangkok, Thailand	Decision	5	3:00
2015-07-02	Win	(Thailand) Sprinter Petsiri Gym	Rajadamnern Stadium	Bangkok, Thailand	KO	2	
2015-04-29	Loss	(Thailand) Kengkla Por.Pekko	Rajadamnern Stadium	Bangkok, Thailand	KO	3	
2015-03-17	Win	(Thailand) Peankon Leknakhonsi	Lumpinee Stadium	Bangkok, Thailand	Decision	5	3:00
2015-02-03	Draw	(Thailand) Jomhod Eminentair	Lumpinee Stadium	Bangkok, Thailand	Decision	5	3:00
2014-12-09	Loss	(Thailand) Kengkla Por.Pekko	Lumpinee Stadium	Bangkok, Thailand	Decision	5	3:00
Loses Lumpinee 115 lbs title
2014-11-09	Loss	(Thailand) Jomhod Eminentair	Channel 7 Boxing Stadium	Bangkok, Thailand	Decision	5	3:00
Loses Channel 7 Boxing Stadium 115 lbs title
2014-09-30	Win	(Thailand) Kengkla Por.Pekko	Lumpinee Stadium	Thailand	Decision	5	3:00
2014-09-05	Win	(Thailand) Chaisiri Sakniranrat	Lumpinee Stadium	Thailand	KO	4	
2014-07-17	loss	(Thailand) Kengkla Por.Pekko		Thailand	Decision	5	3:00
2014-06-06	Loss	(Thailand) Panpayak Jitmuangnon	Lumpinee Stadium	Bangkok, Thailand	TKO (elbow/ref stoppage)	5	3:00
2014-04-08	Win	(Thailand) Panpayak Jitmuangnon	Lumpinee Stadium	Bangkok, Thailand	Decision	5	3:00
Defends Lumpinee Stadium 115 lbs title
2014-02-11	loss	(Thailand) Phetpimai Or.Phimonsri	Lumpinee Stadium	Bangkok, Thailand	Decision	5	3:00
2013-12-20	Win	(Thailand) Visanlek Seatrandiscovery	Lumpinee Stadium	Bangkok, Thailand	KO (Spinning back fist)	5	
2013-11-15	Win	(Thailand) Ponkrit Chor Churnkamol	Lumpinee Stadium	Bangkok, Thailand	Decision	5	3:00
2013-10-03	Win	(Thailand) Ponkrit Chor Churnkamol	Rajadamnern Stadium	Bangkok, Thailand	Decision	5	3:00
2013-09-06	Win	(Thailand) Yokphet Sompongmabtaput	Lumpinee Stadium	Bangkok, Thailand	Decision	5	3:00
Wins Lumpinee Stadium 115 lbs title
2013-08-02	Win	(Thailand) Kusagonnoi Sor Joonsen	Lumpinee Stadium	Bangkok, Thailand	Decision	5	3:00
2013-07-09	Loss	(Thailand) Prajanchai Por.Phetnamtong	Lumpinee Stadium	Bangkok, Thailand	Decision	5	3:00
2013-06-09	Win	(Thailand) Kengkla Por.Pekko	Channel 7 Boxing Stadium	Bangkok, Thailand	Decision	5	3:00
Wins Channel 7 Boxing Stadium 115 lbs title
2013-05-07	Loss	(Thailand) Kengkla Por.Pekko	Channel 7 Boxing Stadium	Bangkok, Thailand	Decision	5	3:00
2013-03-08	Loss	(Thailand) Yokphet Sompongmataput	Lumpinee Stadium	Bangkok, Thailand	Decision	5	3:00
2013-02-05	Loss	(Thailand) Yokphet Sompongmataput	Lumpinee Stadium	Bangkok, Thailand	Decision	5	3:00
For the Lumpinee Stadium 115 lbs title
2013-01-04	Win	(Thailand) Superlek Kiatmuu9	Lumpinee Stadium	Bangkok, Thailand	Decision	5	3:00
2012-12-06	Win	(Thailand) Petbaankek Sor.Sommai	Rajadamnern Stadium	Bangkok, Thailand	Decision	5	3:00
2012-11-06	Win	(Thailand) Pentai Singpatong	Lumpinee Stadium	Bangkok, Thailand	KO	4	
2012-10-12	Loss	(Thailand) Yokphet Sompongmataput	Lumpinee Stadium	Bangkok, Thailand	Decision	5	3:00
2012-09-07	Loss	(Thailand) Chokprecha Kor.Sakuncha	Lumpinee Stadium	Bangkok, Thailand	Decision	5	3:00
2012-07-27	Win	(Thailand) Chokprecha Kor.Sakuncha	Channel 7 Boxing Stadium	Bangkok, Thailand	KO (Left high kick)	5	
2012-06-08	Win	(Thailand) Choknumchai Sitjakong	Lumpinee Stadium	Bangkok, Thailand	Decision	5	3:00
Defends Lumpinee Stadium 115 lbs title
2012-05-15	Win	(Thailand) Nuangthep EminentAir	Lumpinee Stadium	Bangkok, Thailand	Decision	5	3:00
2012-01-29	Loss	(Thailand) Phunkrit Kor.Kampanat	Channel 7 Boxing Stadium	Bangkok, Thailand	Decision	5	3:00
2012-01-29	Loss	(Thailand) Mongkolchai Kwaitonggym	Channel 7 Boxing Stadium	Bangkok, Thailand	Decision	5	3:00
2011-12-22	Win	(Thailand) Rataket Teeded99	Birthday Celebrations Of Rajadamnern Stadium	Bangkok, Thailand	Decision	5	3:00
2011-11-22	Loss	(Thailand) Satanfah EminentAir		Bangkok, Thailand	Decision	5	3:00
2011-10-04	Win	(Thailand) Nuangthep EminentAir	Lumpinee Stadium	Bangkok, Thailand	KO (uppercuts)	1	2:53
2011-09-06	Win	(Thailand) Chokprecha Kor.Sakuncha	Lumpinee Stadium	Bangkok, Thailand	Decision	5	3:00
Wins Lumpinee Stadium 115 lbs title
2011-06-28	Win	(Thailand) Chokprecha Kor.Sakuncha		Bangkok, Thailand	Decision	5	3:00
2011-03-08	Loss	(Thailand) Nuangthep EminentAir	Lumpinee Stadium	Bangkok, Thailand	Decision	5	3:00
2011-01-02	Win	(Thailand) Kingsang Kor.Saklamphun	Channel 7 Boxing Stadium	Bangkok, Thailand	KO	3	
2010-10-19	Loss	(Thailand) Khunsuk P.N.Gym	Lumpinee Stadium	Bangkok, Thailand	KO	3	
2010-09-24	Loss	(Thailand) Mongkolchai Kwaitonggym	Lumpinee Stadium	Bangkok, Thailand	Decision	5	3:00
Lost Lumpinee Stadium 108 lbs title
2010-07-20	Loss	(Thailand) Mongkolchai Kwaitonggym	Lumpinee Stadium	Bangkok, Thailand	Decision	5	3:00
2010-05-23	Win	(Thailand) Supernoi Chor Patcharapon	Channel 7 Boxing Stadium	Bangkok, Thailand	Decision	5	3:00
Wins Channel 7 Boxing Stadium 112 lbs title
2010-02-26	Win	(Thailand) Mongkolchai Kwaitonggym	Lumpinee Stadium	Bangkok, Thailand	TKO	2	
2009-12-08	Win	(Thailand) Khunsuk P.N.Gym	Lumpinee Stadium	Bangkok, Thailand	Decision	5	3:00
Wins the Lumpinee Stadium 108 lbs title and a side-bet of 1 million baht.
2009-10-13	Loss	(Thailand) Khunsuk P.N.Gym	Lumpinee Stadium	Bangkok, Thailand	Decision	5	3:00
2009-08-31	Win	(Thailand) Thanusueklek Or.Kwanmuang	Rajadamnern Stadium	Bangkok, Thailand	Decision	5	3:00
2009-04-23	Win	(Thailand) Nampetch Sor.Thanthip	Rajadamnern Stadium	Bangkok, Thailand	Decision	5	3:00
Legend: Win Loss Draw/No contest Notes
