= Jomhod Eminentair =

Thai Muay Thai fighter

- Born: Larawun Phanonyoung; July 10, 1988 (age 38); Ubon Ratchathani, Thailand
- Other names: Jomhod Moopingaroijungboie; Jomhod Sagami; Jomhod Auto MuayThai; Jomhod Gor.Suwantat
- Nationality: Thai
- Height: 165 cm (5 ft 5 in)
- Weight: 52 kg (115 lb; 8.2 st)
- Fighting out of: Bangkok, Thailand

Kickboxing record
- Total: 149
- Wins: 108
- Losses: 40
- Draws: 1

Other information
- Boxing record from BoxRec

Jomhod Eminentair (จอมโหด อีมิเน้นท์แอร์) is a Thai Muay Thai fighter.

== Titles and accomplishments ==
- Regional
  - Isan Region 55 lbs Champion
- OneSongchai
  - 2006 S1 World 105 lbs Champion
- Channel 7 Boxing Stadium
  - 2008 Channel 7 Stadium 108 lbs Champion
  - 2014 Channel 7 Stadium 115 lbs Champion (defended twice)
  - 2018 Channel 7 Stadium 115 lbs Champion (defended three times)
  - 2022 Channel 7 Stadium 115 lbs Champion
- World Boxing Council Muay Thai
  - 2013 WBC Muay Thai World 122 lbs Champion
- Rajadamnern Stadium
  - 2015 Rajadamnern Stadium 115 lbs Champion

== Fight record ==
Muay Thai Record
Date	Result	Opponent	Event	Location	Method	Round	Time
2025-08-16	Loss	(Thailand) Pangtor Por.Lakboon	Rajadamnern World Series	Bangkok, Thailand	KO (Elbow)	4	1:00
For the vacant Rajadamnern Stadium Super Flyweight (115 lbs) title.
2025-05-17	Win	(Thailand) Lookkrokpetch Por.Lakboon	Rajadamnern World Series	Bangkok, Thailand	TKO (injury)	1	1:17
2025-03-08	Win	(Japan) Issei Ishii	Rajadamnern World Series	Bangkok, Thailand	Decision (Unanimous)	3	3:00
2024-11-23	Loss	(Thailand) Kumandoi Petchyindee Academy	Rajdamnern World Series, Rajadamnern Stadium	Bangkok, Thailand	Decision (Unanimous)	3	3:00
2024-07-14	Loss	(Japan) Nadaka Yoshinari	Rajadamnern World Series Japan	Tokyo, Japan	Decision (Unanimous)	5	3:00
For the Rajadamnern Stadium Super Flyweight (115 lbs) title.
2024-06-01	Win	(Iran) Sayed Mahdi	Rajadamnern World Series, Rajadamnern Stadium	Bangkok, Thailand	Decision (Unanimous)	3	3:00
2024-03-23	Win	(Spain) Albert Campos	Rajadamnern World Series, Rajadamnern Stadium	Bangkok, Thailand	Decision (Unanimous)	3	3:00
2023-09-22	Loss	(Thailand) Songchainoi Kiatsongrit	ONE Friday Fights 34, Lumpinee Stadium	Bangkok, Thailand	TKO (3 knockdowns)	2	0:54
2023-06-23	Loss	(Algeria) Akram Hamidi	ONE Friday Fights 22, Lumpinee Stadium	Bangkok, Thailand	TKO (Left hook to the body)	2	0:36
2023-03-10	Win	(Sweden) Daniel Gyllenberg	ONE Friday Fights 8, Lumpinee Stadium	Bangkok, Thailand	TKO (punches + elbows)	2	1:05
2022-07-17	Loss	(Thailand) Rak Erawan	Channel 7 Boxing Stadium	Bangkok, Thailand	Decision	5	3:00
Loses Channel 7 Boxing Stadium 115 lbs title
2022-04-23	Loss	(Republic of Ireland) Ryan Sheehan	Siam Warriors	Cork City, Ireland	Decision (Split)	5	3:00
For the vacant ISKA Muay Thai World Bantamweight and the WBC Muay Thai World Super Bantamweight titles.
2022-03-06	Win	(Thailand) Chusap Sor.Salacheep	Channel 7 Boxing Stadium	Bangkok, Thailand	Decision	5	3:00
Wins the vacant Channel 7 Boxing Stadium 115 lbs title
2021-12-19	Win	(Thailand) SingUdon Gor.Soytan	Kiatpetch Amarin Super Fight, Rajadamnern Stadium	Bangkok, Thailand	KO	2	
2021-04-24	Loss	(Thailand) Chokpanlan Por.Lakboon	Channel 7 Boxing Stadium	Bangkok, Thailand	Decision	5	3:00
Loses Channel 7 Boxing Stadium 115 lbs title
2021-03-06	Win	(Laos) Theut Powerhouse	Muay Hardcore	Bangkok, Thailand	KO (right uppercut)	2	2:08
2020-12-10	Win	(Thailand) Phetsommai Sor.Sommai	Rajadamnern Stadium	Bangkok, Thailand	Decision	5	3:00
2020-09-06	Win	(Thailand) Kiew Parunchai	Muay Jet Si, Channel 7 Boxing Stadium	Bangkok, Thailand	Decision	5	3:00
Defends Channel 7 Boxing Stadium 115 lbs title
2020-02-09	Loss	(Thailand) Kiew Parunchai	Srithammaracha + Kiatpetch Super Fight	Nakhon Si Thammarat, Thailand	Decision	5	3:00
2019-12-18	Win	(Thailand) Seeoui Singmawin	Rajadamnern Stadium	Bangkok, Thailand	KO	1	
2019-09-15	Win	(Thailand) Watcharapon PkSaenchaigym	Samui Festival + Kiatpetch	Koh Samui, Thailand	Decision	5	3:00
2019-08-11	Win	(Thailand) Kiew Parunchai	Nonthaburi Stadium	Nonthaburi, Thailand	Decision	5	3:00
2019-06-23	Win	(Thailand) Ongree Sor Dechapan	Channel 7 Boxing Stadium	Bangkok, Thailand	Decision	5	3:00
Defends Channel 7 Boxing Stadium 115 lbs title
2019-05-12	Win	(Thailand) Superjeng Sor.SamarnGarment	Channel 7 Boxing Stadium	Bangkok, Thailand	Decision	5	3:00
2019-04-14	Loss	(Thailand) Superjeng Sor.SamarnGarment	Chang MuayThai Kiatpetch Super Fight	Si Sa Ket, Thailand	Decision	5	3:00
2019-02-12	Loss	(Thailand) Kompetch Sitsarawatsuer	Lumpinee Stadium	Bangkok, Thailand	Decision	5	3:00
2018-12-07	Loss	(Thailand) Rungnarai Kiatmuu9	Lumpinee Stadium	Bangkok, Thailand	Decision	5	3:00
For the vacant Lumpinee Stadium 115 lbs title.
2018-11-11	Win	(Mongolia) Borkhuu Mega	Muay Thai Super Champ	Bangkok, Thailand	Decision	3	3:00
2018-09-09	Win	(Thailand) Watcharapon PkSaenchaigym	Channel 7 Boxing Stadium	Bangkok, Thailand	Decision	5	3:00
Defends Channel 7 Boxing Stadium 115 lbs title
2018-05-27	Win	(Thailand) Wanchalong PK.Saenchai	Channel 7 Boxing Stadium	Bangkok, Thailand	TKO	2	
Wins Channel 7 Boxing Stadium 115 lbs title
2018-05-01	Loss	(Thailand) Watcharapon PkSaenchaigym	Lumpinee Stadium	Bangkok, Thailand	Decision	5	3:00
2018-04-04	Win	(Thailand) Palangpon PechyindeeAcademy	Rajadamnern Stadium	Bangkok, Thailand	Decision	5	3:00
2018-01-28	Win	(Thailand) Watcharapon PkSaenchaigym	Channel 7 Boxing Stadium	Bangkok, Thailand	Decision	5	3:00
2017-11-25	Loss	(Thailand) Petchphusang KeelaSport	Kriatpetch Super Fight	Bangkok, Thailand	KO	5	
2017-09-10	Loss	(Thailand) Jakdao Petkiatpetch	Channel 7 Boxing Stadium	Bangkok, Thailand	Decision	5	3:00
2017-06-17	Win	(Thailand) Petchphusang KeelaSport		Laos	KO	4	
2017-05-13	Loss	(Thailand) Petchphusang KeelaSport	Lumpinee Stadium	Bangkok, Thailand	Decision	5	3:00
2017-03-21	Win	(Thailand) Watcharapon PkSaenchaigym	Lumpinee Stadium	Bangkok, Thailand	Decision	5	3:00
2017-02-10	Loss	(Thailand) Watcharapon PkSaenchaigym	Lumpinee Stadium	Bangkok, Thailand	Decision	5	3:00
2017-01-14	Win	(Thailand) Aikwayu Mor.Krungthepthonburi	Lumpinee Stadium	Bangkok, Thailand	Decision	5	3:00
2016-12-16	Draw	(Thailand) Aikwayu Mor.Krungthepthonburi	Lumpinee Stadium	Bangkok, Thailand	Decision	5	3:00
2016-11-19	Loss	(Thailand) Yokmorakot Wor.Sanprapai	Lumpinee Stadium	Bangkok, Thailand	Decision	5	3:00
2016-08-08	Loss	(Thailand) Yothin FA Group	Rajadamnern Stadium	Bangkok, Thailand	Decision	5	3:00
2016-07-29	Win	(Thailand) Kengkla Por.Pekko	Lumpinee Stadium	Bangkok, Thailand	KO	2	
2016-07-01	Win	(Thailand) Wanchalong PK.Saenchai	80th Anniversary Commemoration Stadium	Nakhon Ratchasima, Thailand	Decision	5	3:00
2016-05-29	Win	(Thailand) Phonkit Tor.Ieowjaroentong	Jitmuangnon Stadium	Bangkok, Thailand	Decision	5	3:00
2016-04-08	Win	(Thailand) Wanchalong PK.Saenchai		Khon Kaen, Thailand	Decision	5	3:00
2016-02-14	Loss	(Thailand) Kengkla Por.Pekko	Channel 7 Boxing Stadium	Bangkok, Thailand	Decision	5	3:00
2015-11-29	Loss	(Thailand) Wanchalong PK.Saenchai	Channel 7 Boxing Stadium	Bangkok, Thailand	Decision	5	3:00
lost Channel 7 Boxing Stadium 115 lbs title
2015-10-13	Win	(Thailand) Wanchalong PK.Saenchai	Lumpinee Stadium	Bangkok, Thailand	Decision	5	3:00
2015-09-04	Win	(Thailand) Saknarinnoi Or.Auansuwan	Lumpinee Stadium	Bangkok, Thailand	KO	3	
2015-08-06	Win	(Thailand) Chaisiri Saknirunrath	Rajadamnern Stadium	Bangkok, Thailand	Decision	5	3:00
Wins Rajadamnern Stadium 115 lbs title
2015-06-05	Loss	(Thailand) Kengkla Por.Pekko	Lumpinee Stadium	Bangkok, Thailand	Decision	5	3:00
For the Lumpinee Stadium 115 lbs title
2015-05-03	Win	(Thailand) Saknarinnoi Or.Auansuwan	Channel 7 Boxing Stadium	Bangkok, Thailand	Decision	5	3:00
Defends Channel 7 Boxing Stadium 115 lbs title
2015-03-08	Win	(Thailand) Splinter Pangkongprab	Channel 7 Boxing Stadium	Bangkok, Thailand	Decision	5	3:00
Defends Channel 7 Boxing Stadium 115 lbs title
2015-02-03	Draw	(Thailand) Wanchalong PK.Saenchai	Lumpinee Stadium	Bangkok, Thailand	Decision	5	3:00
2014-11-09	Win	(Thailand) Wanchalong PK.Saenchai	Channel 7 Boxing Stadium	Bangkok, Thailand	Decision	5	3:00
Wins Channel 7 Boxing Stadium 115 lbs title
2014-10-07	Win	(Thailand) Chaisiri Saknirunrath	Lumpinee Stadium	Bangkok, Thailand	Decision	5	3:00
2014-09-05	Win	(Thailand) Pichitchai PKSaenchaigym	Lumpinee Stadium	Bangkok, Thailand	Decision	5	3:00
2014-08-08	Loss	(Thailand) Kengkla Por.Pekko	Lumpinee Stadium	Bangkok, Thailand	Decision	5	3:00
2014-07	Win	(Thailand) Chaykhom Sitjakhan	Channel 7 Boxing Stadium	Bangkok, Thailand	Decision	5	3:00
2014-04-18	Win	(Thailand) Serbin Kiatjaroenchai	Lumpinee Stadium	Bangkok, Thailand	KO	2	
2014-02-11	Loss	(Thailand) Yokpet Yodasawintransport	Lumpinee Stadium	Bangkok, Thailand	Decision	5	3:00
2013-11-19	Win	(Thailand) Pentai Sitnumnoi	Lumpinee Stadium	Bangkok, Thailand	Decision	5	3:00
2013-10-25	Win	(Thailand) Talatkek Saksamrit	Lumpinee Stadium	Bangkok, Thailand	KO (Left Straight)	3	
2013-10-03	Loss	(Thailand) Panpayak Jitmuangnon	Rajadamnern Stadium	Bangkok, Thailand	Decision	5	3:00
2013-09-12	Win	(Thailand) Pet Or Pimonsee	Rajadamnern Stadium	Bangkok, Thailand	KO (Left Hook)	2	
2013-07-29	Loss	(Thailand) Trakunpet Sor Sommai	Rajadamnern Stadium	Bangkok, Thailand	Decision	5	3:00
2013-05-16	Win	(United States) Romie Adanza	M-One: Reborn	Highland, California, United States	TKO (cut)	1	1:21
Wins the WBC Muaythai World Super Flyweight (122 lbs) title.
2013-04-28	Win	(Thailand) Pentai Sitnumnoi	Bangla Stadium	Phuket, Thailand	Decision	5	3:00
2013-04-05	Win	(Thailand) Kusagonnoi Sor.Joonsen	Lumpinee Stadium	Bangkok, Thailand	KO	3	
2013-02-05	Win	(Thailand) Pentai Sitnumnoi	Lumpinee Stadium	Bangkok, Thailand	Decision	5	3:00
2012-10-05	Loss	(Thailand) Pentai Sitnumnoi	Lumpinee Stadium	Thailand	Decision	5	3:00
2012-08-11	Loss	(Thailand) Pentai Sitnumnoi		Thailand	Decision	5	3:00
2008-12-09	Loss	(Thailand) Wanheng Menayothin	Lumpinee Stadium	Bangkok, Thailand	Decision	5	3:00
2008	Win	(Thailand) Namphet Sor Tarntip	Channel 7 Boxing Stadium	Bangkok, Thailand	Decision	5	3:00
Wins the Channel 7 Boxing Stadium 108 lbs title
2007-03-22	Win	(Thailand) Namphet Sor Tarntip		Bangkok, Thailand	TKO	2	
2006-09-22	Loss	(Thailand) Wanheng Menayothin	Lumpinee Stadium	Bangkok, Thailand	Decision	5	3:00
For the Lumpinee Stadium 105 lbs title
2006-10-28	Loss	(Thailand) Palangpon Piriyanopachai	Onesongchai	Bangkok, Thailand	KO	2	
2006-08-31	Win	(Thailand) Palangpon Piriyanopachai		Bangkok, Thailand	Decision	5	3:00
2006-08-14	Win	(Thailand) Sipatanalak Kiat Por Chaideat	Rajadamnern Stadium	Bangkok, Thailand	Decision	5	3:00
2006-07-05	Win	(Thailand) Sudpatapee Deatrat	Rajadamnern Stadium	Bangkok, Thailand	Decision	5	3:00
Wins the vacant S-1 World 105 lbs title
2006-03-27	Draw	(Thailand) Thepnakorn Aor.Kwanmuang	Onesongchai, Rajadamnern Stadium	Bangkok, Thailand	Decision	5	3:00
2005-12-22	Win	(Thailand) Werachai P.Muangtungsong	Rajadamnern Stadium	Bangkok, Thailand	TKO	2	
2005-08-19	Win	(Thailand) Nongbew Sor.Sinchai		Bangkok, Thailand	Decision	5	3:00
2005-07-28	Win	(Thailand) Tawanchai Sakhirunchai	Lumpinee Stadium	Bangkok, Thailand	KO	2	
2005-06-27	Win	(Thailand) Weerachai Por.Muangtungsong	Lumpinee Stadium	Bangkok, Thailand	KO	4	
2005-06-06	Win	(Thailand) Lukhai Sor.Panajerphet	Lumpinee Stadium	Bangkok, Thailand	Decision	5	3:00
2005-	Win	(Thailand) Petchchanchai Sor.Mongkolket		Nonthaburi province, Thailand	TKO	3	
2005-	Win	(Thailand) Petchchanchai Sor.Mongkolket		Khlong Toei district, Thailand	TKO	2	
2005-	Draw	(Thailand) Sripatanalek Kiat Por Chaidet		Thailand	Decision	5	3:00
2004-11-11	Win	(Thailand) Tewarath Kiatyongyut	Onesongchai, Rajadamnern Stadium	Bangkok, Thailand	Decision	5	3:00
2004-05-20	Loss	(Thailand) Petchsanguan Sitniwat		Bangkok, Thailand	Decision	5	3:00
Legend: Win Loss Draw/No contest Notes
