= Ko Ngai =

Island in Thailand

Native name: เกาะไหง
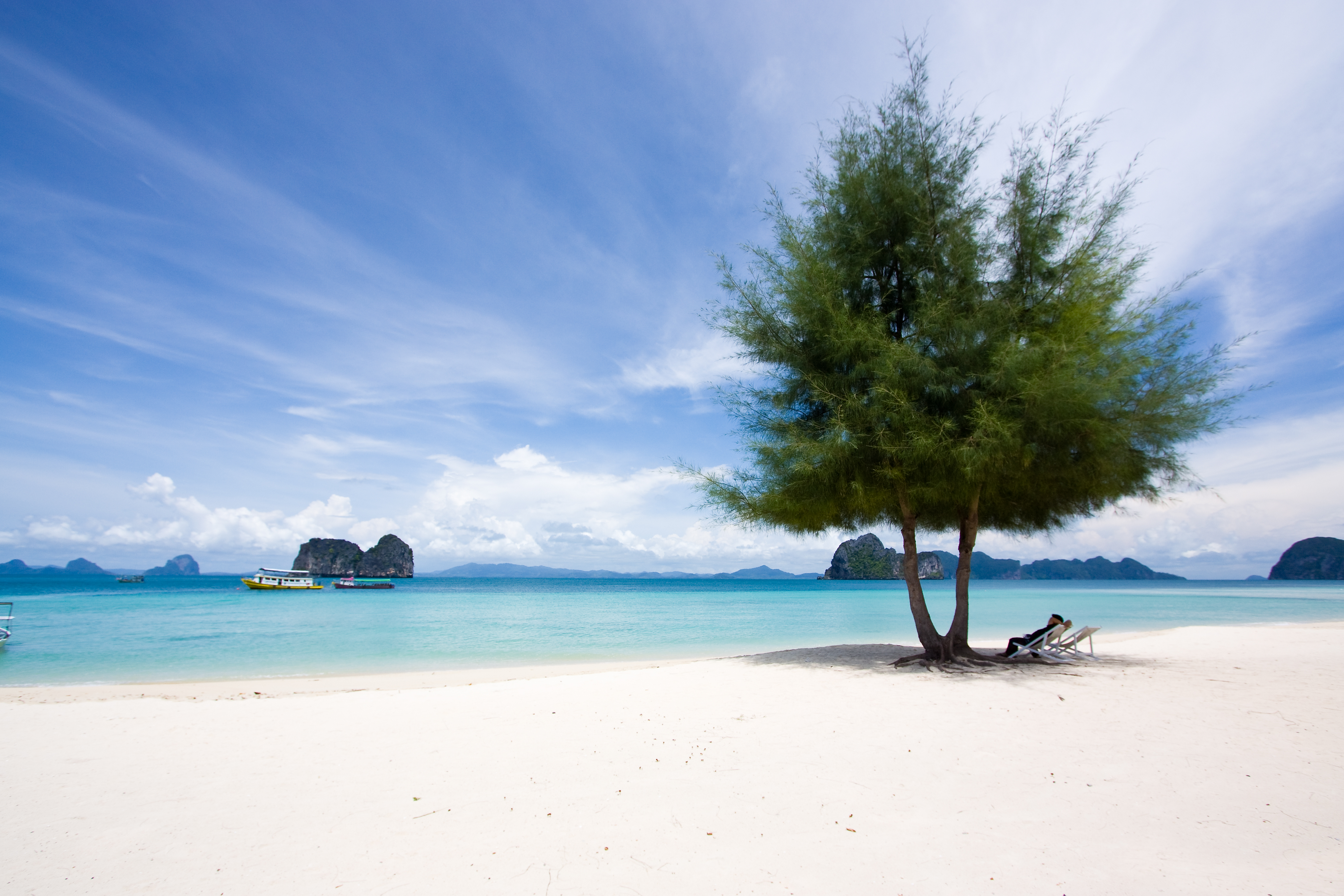
- Ko Ngai Beach
- Interactive map of Ko Ngai

Geography
- Location: Strait of Malacca
- Coordinates: 7.414811°N 99.204858°E
- Archipelago: Lanta Islands
- Area: 3.59 km^{2} (1.39 sq mi)

Administration
- Thailand
- Province: Krabi
- District: Ko Lanta
- Tambon: Ko Lanta Yai

Demographics
- Languages: Thai, Southern Thai

Additional information
- Time zone: ICT (UTC+7)
- Postal code: 81150

Ko Ngai (เกาะไหง) is an island in Krabi Province, but can better be reached via Trang Province on the southern Andaman Coast. Like many other coastal destinations in southern Thailand, it is known for its diving and long white beaches.

== Gallery ==
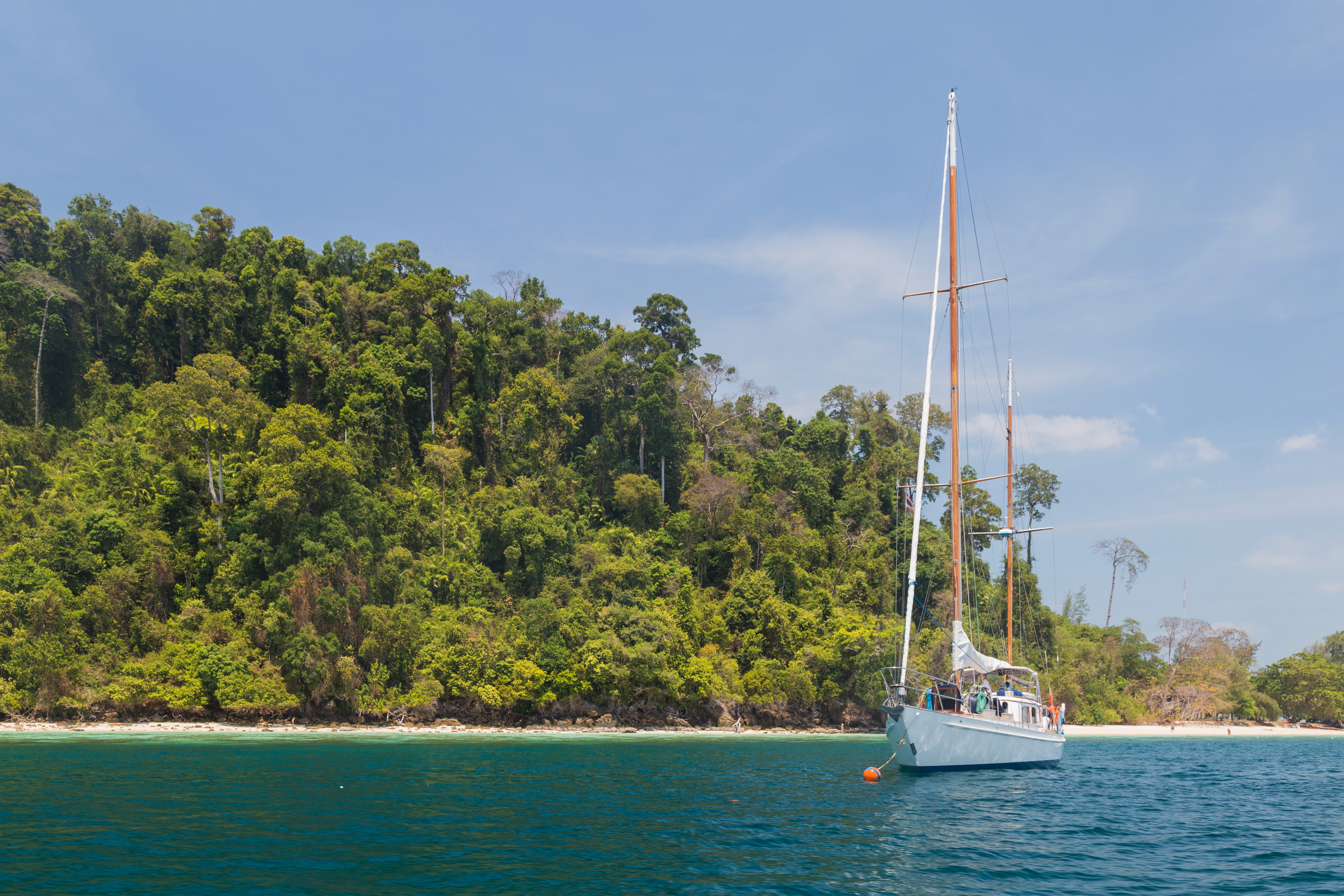

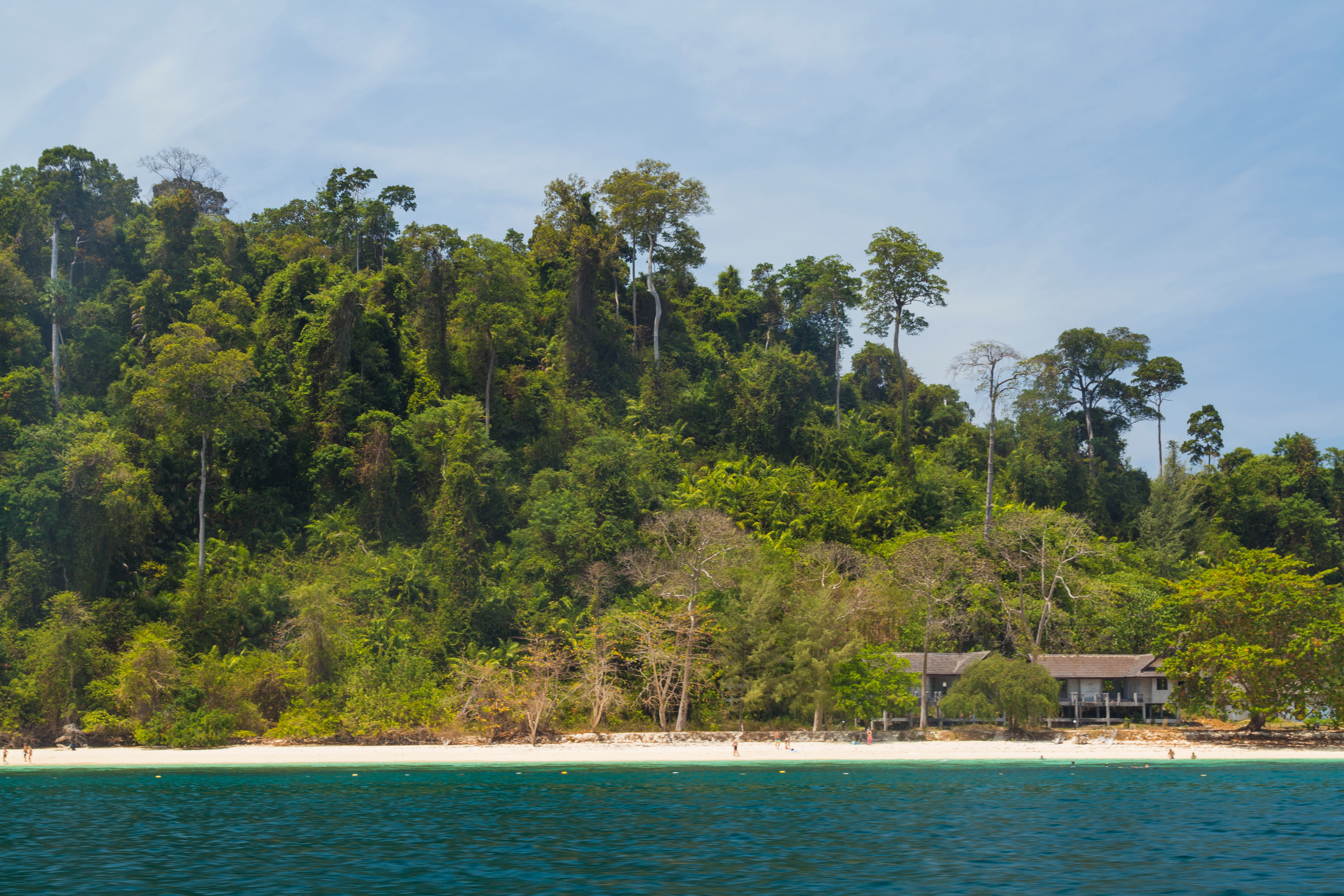

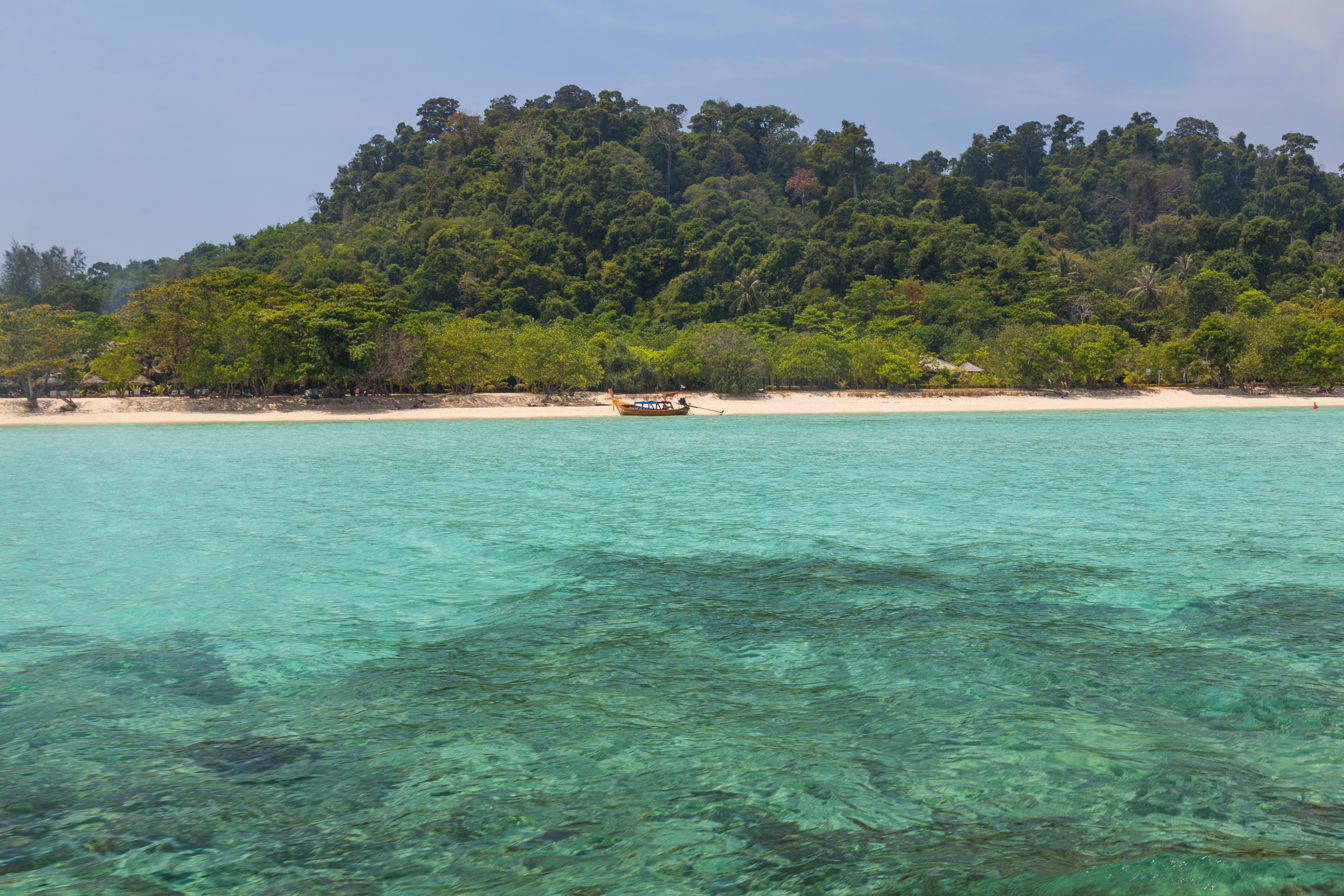

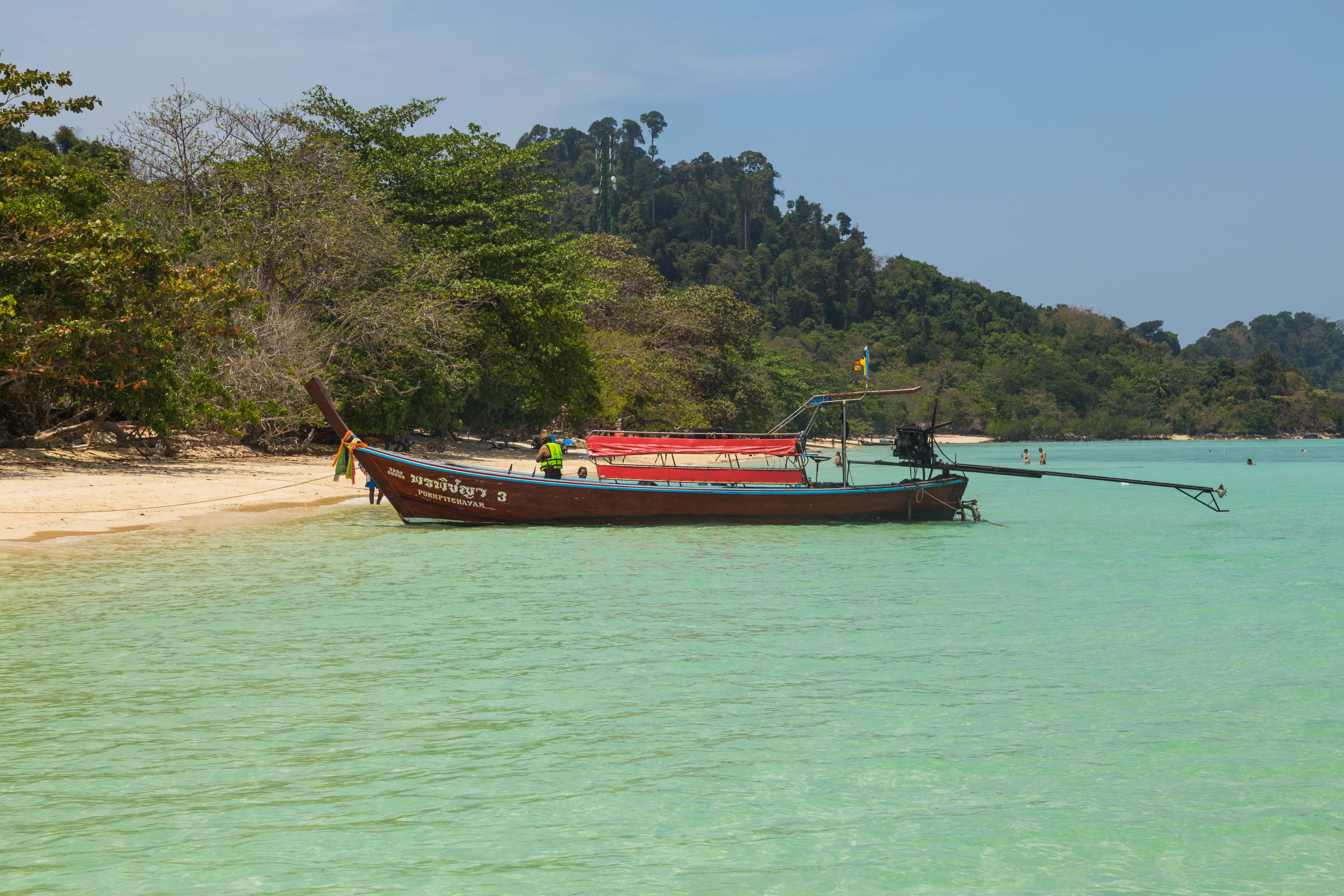
