= Ko Lanta district =

Ko Lanta เกาะลันตา
- District
- District location in Krabi province
- Coordinates: 7°39′20″N 99°2′31″E
- Country: Thailand
- Province: Krabi
- Seat: Saladan

Area
  - Total: 339.843 km^{2} (131.214 sq mi)

Population (2012)
  - Total: 30,500
  - Density: 81.4/km^{2} (211/sq mi)
- Time zone: UTC+7 (ICT)
- Postal code: 81150
- Geocode: 8103

Ko Lanta (Thai: เกาะลันตา, pronounced [kɔ̀ʔ lān.tāː]) is a district (amphoe) in Krabi province, Thailand.

== History ==
The district was established in December 1901. It consists of four island groups: Mu Ko Lanta (170 km^{2}), Mu Ko Klang (162 km^{2}), Mu Ko Rok (3.5 km^{2}), and Mu Ko Ngai (3.6 km^{2}). Other island groups are smaller, like Mu Ko Haa.

The origin of the name is unclear, but it may originate from the Javanese word lantas, meaning a type of grill for fish. The name of the island was officially changed to Lanta in 1917.

It is believed that the area was one of the oldest communities in Thailand, dating back to the prehistoric period. It is believed that this province may have taken its name after the meaning of Krabi, which means 'sword'. This may have stemmed from a legend that an ancient sword was unearthed prior to the city's founding.

== Geography ==
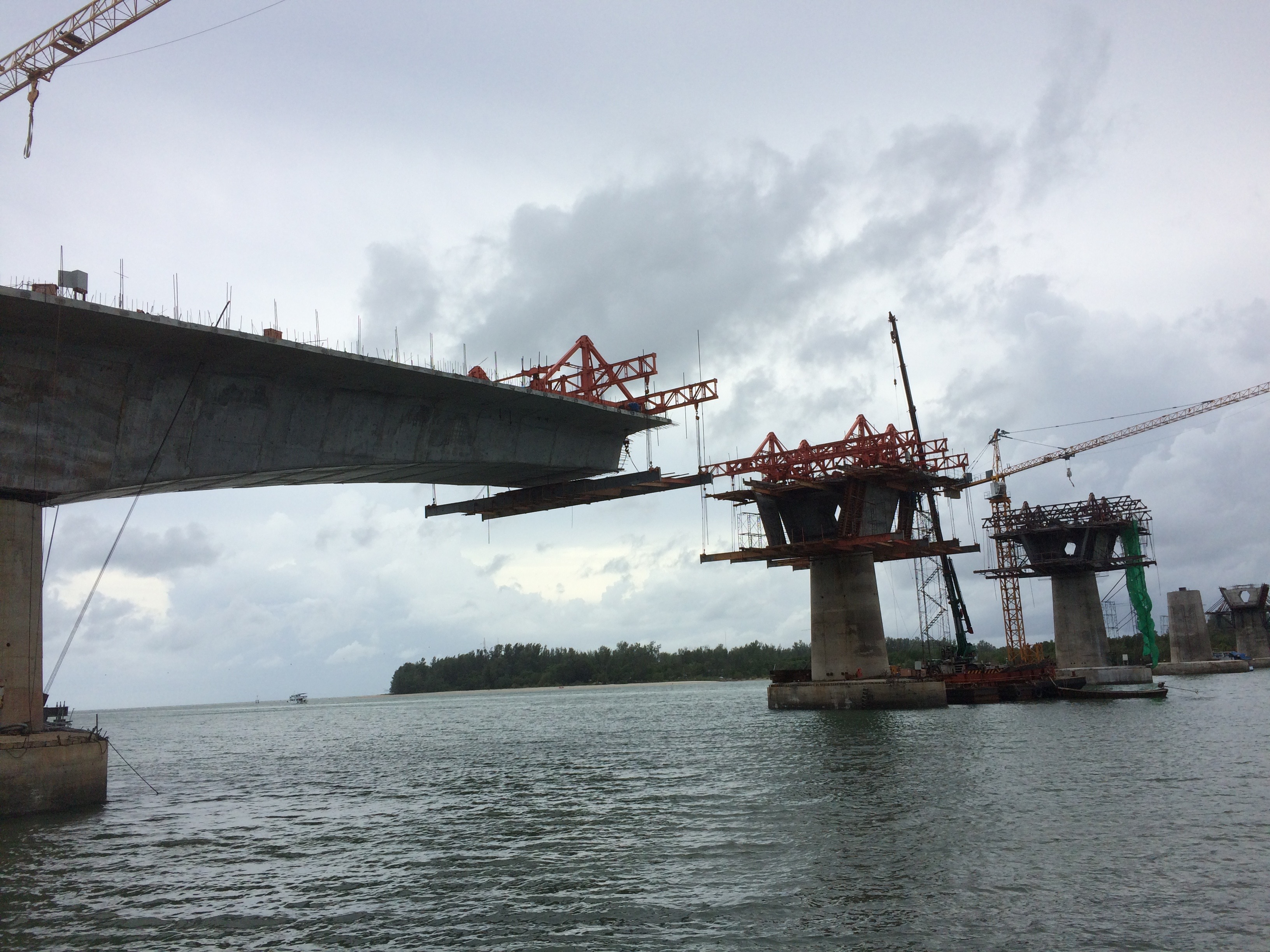
Bridge construction between Ko Lanta Noi and Ko Lanta Yai, August 2015

The district, approximately 70 km from Krabi town, consists of three major islands. The first, Ko Klang, is separated from the mainland by a small river (klong) and road bridge, and is often mistakenly thought of as part of mainland Krabi province. Of the two remaining larger islands, the larger, more populated Ko Lanta Yai (commonly known as simply "Ko Lanta") and the smaller Ko Lanta Noi, together with 50 other smaller islands make up the 52 island Mu Ko Lanta National Park. The largest island (Ko Lanta Yai) has nine beaches running down the entire west coast, forests, and tropical jungle. The geography of the island is typically mangroves, coral rimmed beaches, and tree-covered hills. A popular tourist destination, the islands are known for their long, sandy beaches and scuba diving. Ko Lanta Yai and Ko Lanta Noi are connected by the Siri Lanta Bridge opened in 2016.

Neighboring districts are Nuea Khlong to the northwest and Khlong Thom to the northeast and east.

Mu Ko Lanta National Park, established in 1990 as the 62nd national park of Thailand, occupies 134 km^{2} of the district.

== Climate ==
Climate data for Ko Lanta (1991–2020, extremes 1981-present)
Month	Jan	Feb	Mar	Apr	May	Jun	Jul	Aug	Sep	Oct	Nov	Dec	Year
Record high °C (°F)	35.9 (96.6)	37.2 (99.0)	38.0 (100.4)	38.5 (101.3)	38.0 (100.4)	35.0 (95.0)	35.0 (95.0)	34.5 (94.1)	34.0 (93.2)	35.7 (96.3)	34.7 (94.5)	35.0 (95.0)	38.5 (101.3)
Mean daily maximum °C (°F)	32.6 (90.7)	33.5 (92.3)	33.9 (93.0)	33.8 (92.8)	32.6 (90.7)	31.9 (89.4)	31.6 (88.9)	31.2 (88.2)	30.9 (87.6)	31.0 (87.8)	31.3 (88.3)	31.4 (88.5)	32.1 (89.8)
Daily mean °C (°F)	27.7 (81.9)	28.3 (82.9)	28.8 (83.8)	29.0 (84.2)	28.9 (84.0)	28.5 (83.3)	28.2 (82.8)	28.2 (82.8)	27.8 (82.0)	27.4 (81.3)	27.2 (81.0)	27.1 (80.8)	28.1 (82.6)
Mean daily minimum °C (°F)	24.1 (75.4)	24.4 (75.9)	24.7 (76.5)	25.1 (77.2)	25.4 (77.7)	25.3 (77.5)	25.1 (77.2)	25.2 (77.4)	24.8 (76.6)	24.5 (76.1)	24.3 (75.7)	23.9 (75.0)	24.7 (76.5)
Record low °C (°F)	19.0 (66.2)	18.9 (66.0)	20.0 (68.0)	21.5 (70.7)	22.4 (72.3)	22.0 (71.6)	21.7 (71.1)	20.5 (68.9)	21.7 (71.1)	21.2 (70.2)	21.0 (69.8)	19.5 (67.1)	18.9 (66.0)
Average precipitation mm (inches)	31.0 (1.22)	24.1 (0.95)	69.0 (2.72)	121.6 (4.79)	227.5 (8.96)	285.9 (11.26)	288.5 (11.36)	342.0 (13.46)	319.4 (12.57)	297.5 (11.71)	148.4 (5.84)	64.6 (2.54)	2,219.5 (87.38)
Average precipitation days (≥ 1.0 mm)	2.6	1.8	4.8	9.0	14.2	15.1	14.9	14.8	17.0	17.9	12.3	7.8	132.2
Average relative humidity (%)	76.0	74.2	76.7	79.8	82.5	83.4	83.2	83.3	85.0	85.7	84.0	80.4	81.2
Average dew point °C (°F)	22.9 (73.2)	22.9 (73.2)	24.0 (75.2)	25.0 (77.0)	25.5 (77.9)	25.3 (77.5)	25.0 (77.0)	25.0 (77.0)	24.9 (76.8)	24.7 (76.5)	24.2 (75.6)	23.3 (73.9)	24.4 (75.9)
Mean monthly sunshine hours	198.4	183.6	186.0	147.0	114.7	111.0	114.7	114.7	108.0	111.6	105.0	179.8	1,674.5
Mean daily sunshine hours	6.4	6.5	6.0	4.9	3.7	3.7	3.7	3.7	3.6	3.6	3.5	5.8	4.6
Source 1: World Meteorological Organization
Source 2: Office of Water Management and Hydrology, Royal Irrigation Department (sun 1981–2010)(extremes)

== Administration ==
The district is divided into five subdistricts (tambons), which are further subdivided into 37 villages (mubans). Ko Lanta Yai has township (thesaban tambon) status and includes part of tambon Ko Lanta Yai.

No.	Name	Thai name	Villages	Pop.
1.	Ko Lanta Yai	เกาะลันตาใหญ่	8	6,720
2.	Ko Lanta Noi	เกาะลันตาน้อย	8	5,360
3.	Ko Klang	เกาะกลาง	10	7,835
4.	Khlong Yang	คลองยาง	6	5,860
5.	Sala Dan	ศาลาด่าน	5	4,725

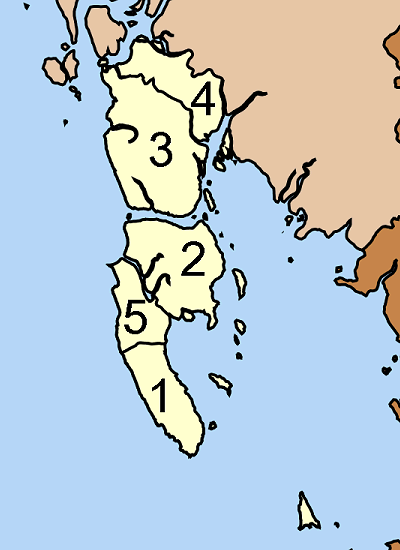

== Islands ==
Nr	Island	Capital	Settlements	Area (km²)	Population (Note: Island's area and population retrieved from the 2012 census)
1	Ko Bu Bu	Had Na Koh	Southern Beach, Northern Beach	0.123	5
2	Ko Ngai (Lanta)	Ban Ko Hai	Laem Lanang, Ao Tapang, Laem Baewa, Ao Muang, Ao Ko Tong, Laem Daeng, Laem Laya, Ao Nako	3.586	100
3	Ko Klang	Huahin (Lanta)	Pak Khlong, Khlong Yang, Tha Klong	165	13,700
4	Ko Lanta Noi	Ban Lanta Noi	Langsod, Klong Mak, Tha Rai, Hua Laem Ngu, Klong Tanod, Thung, Ro Yai, Laem Palm	75	5,350
5	Ko Lanta Yai	Saladan	Thung Yee Pheng, Ban Lanta Yai, Hua Laem, Sung Gau, Ao Tanod, Pra-Ae, Klong Kwang	80.82	10,830
6	Ko Mai Ngam			1.95	0
7	Ko Pleo	Ko Pleo		0.16	10
8	Ko Por	Ko Por	Ao Tha Kang, Ao Nai Ban	1.6	500
9	Ko Rapule			1	0
10	Ko Talabeng	Ao Kua Koh	Ao Talay Waek, Ao Bon	2.04	2
11	Ko Waen			0.17	0
12	Ko Wan Tia			1.44	0
13	Mu Ko Rok	Laem Thong	Ao San Chao, Hat Thalu, Ao Man Sai, Hat Tarua, Laem Sayam	3.48	5
14	Mu Ko Haa	Ko Haa Sam Lagoon	The Chimney Point, Whip Coral Point, Ko Haa Yai coral beach, The Cathedral	0.16	0
15	Mu Ko Maa	Ko Maa		0.1	0
16	More Islands	Ko Raputang, Ko Kam Yai, Ko Kam Noi, Ko Klaueng		2	0
	Ko Lanta district	Ban Saladan		339.7	30,500

== Transport ==
The nearest airports are at Krabi, Trang, and Phuket. Krabi Airport, the most popular one for travel to Ko Lanta, is approximately 10 km from the provincial town and operates international flights to several foreign destinations.

The nearest train station is in Trang Province just south of Krabi. From there, there are trains to and from Bangkok.

There are regular, daily ferry boats operating between Ko Lanta and Krabi, Phuket, and Ko Phi Phi. A ferry run by Phetpaily departs daily from Klongdao Pier on Ko Lanta to Ko Ngai and Ko Mook.

There are only two main roads on Ko Lanta, one in the northeast and another in the southwest, which runs parallel to the beach. On Ko Lanta Noi there is just one main road in the east and a smaller one that links to the ferry pier. On the mainland, Highway 4206 connects with Khlong Thom District, passing Khlong Yang and Koh Klang sub-districts to a public car ferry at Baan Hua Hin. To get from the mainland of Thailand to Ko Lanta Yai, one public car ferry must be taken, then the bridge between Lanta Noi and Lanta Yai. A bridge connecting Ko Lanta to the mainland is currently under construction.

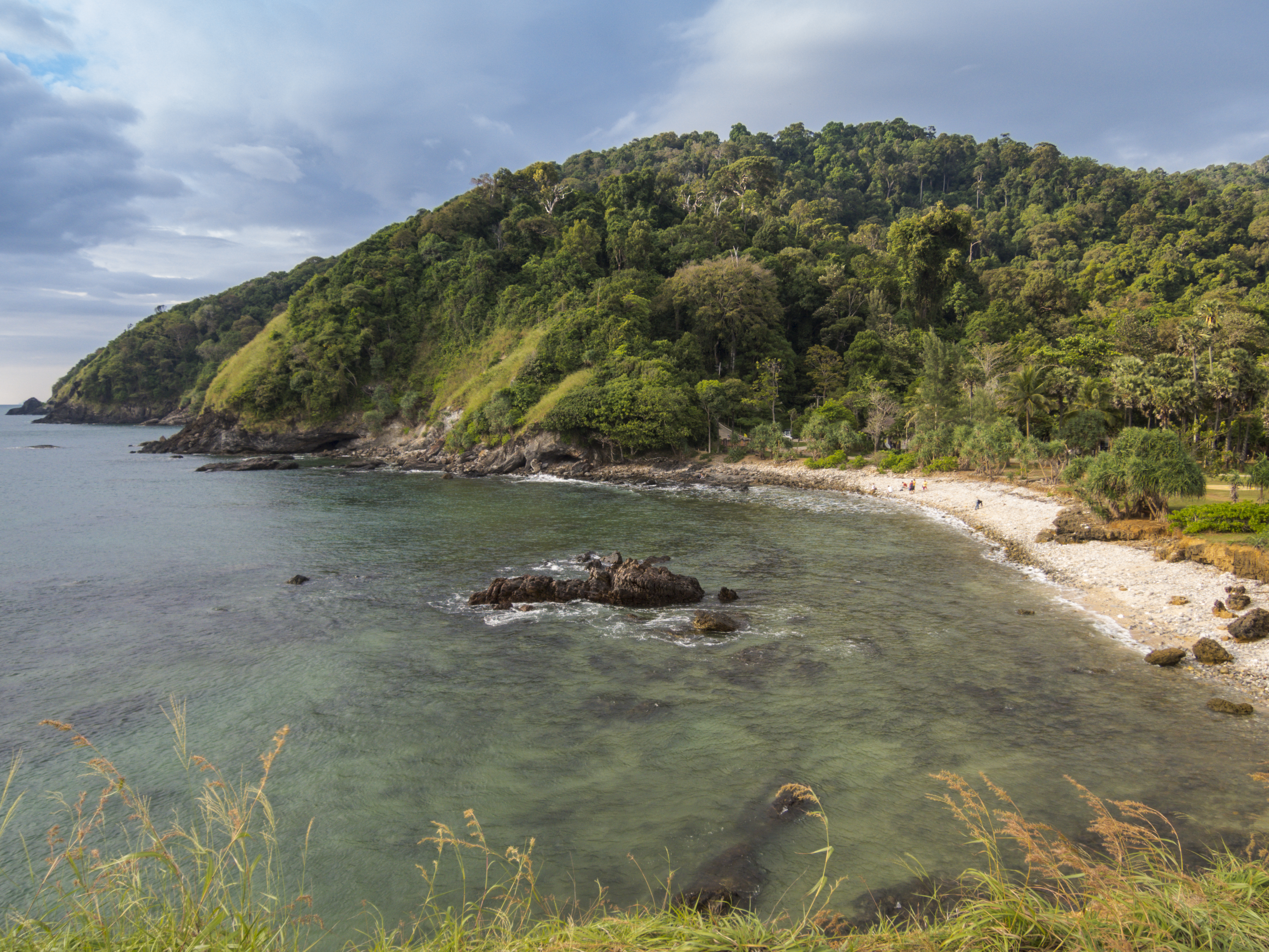
Ko Lanta National Park

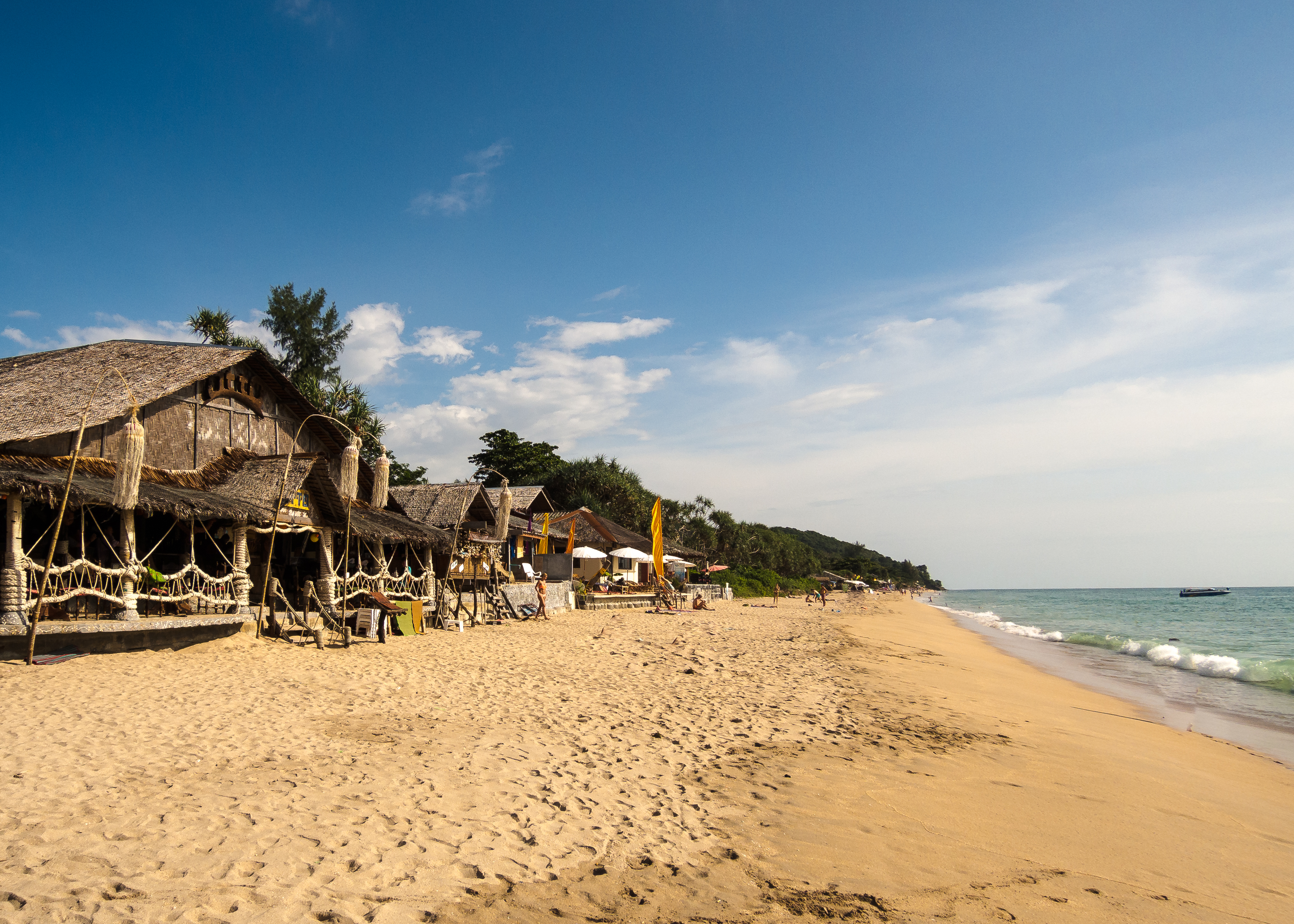
Beach in Ko Lanta

== Culture ==
Krabi and Ko Lanta incorporate a mix of Buddhists, Thai-Chinese, Muslims, and sea gypsies. The majority of the population in rural areas is Muslim. The area, however, has no apparent religious tension. Most of them speak with a thick Southern dialect that is difficult for even other Thais to understand. Given this multiculturalism, Krabi is always celebrating something, be it Thai Buddhist, Thai-Chinese, or Thai-Islamic tradition. Chao-le (sea gypsies) inhabit Ko Lanta and follow a lifestyle that has been relatively unaffected by the islands' tourism.

The French TV show Koh-Lanta took place on Ko Lanta and took its name from there.

== Gallery ==
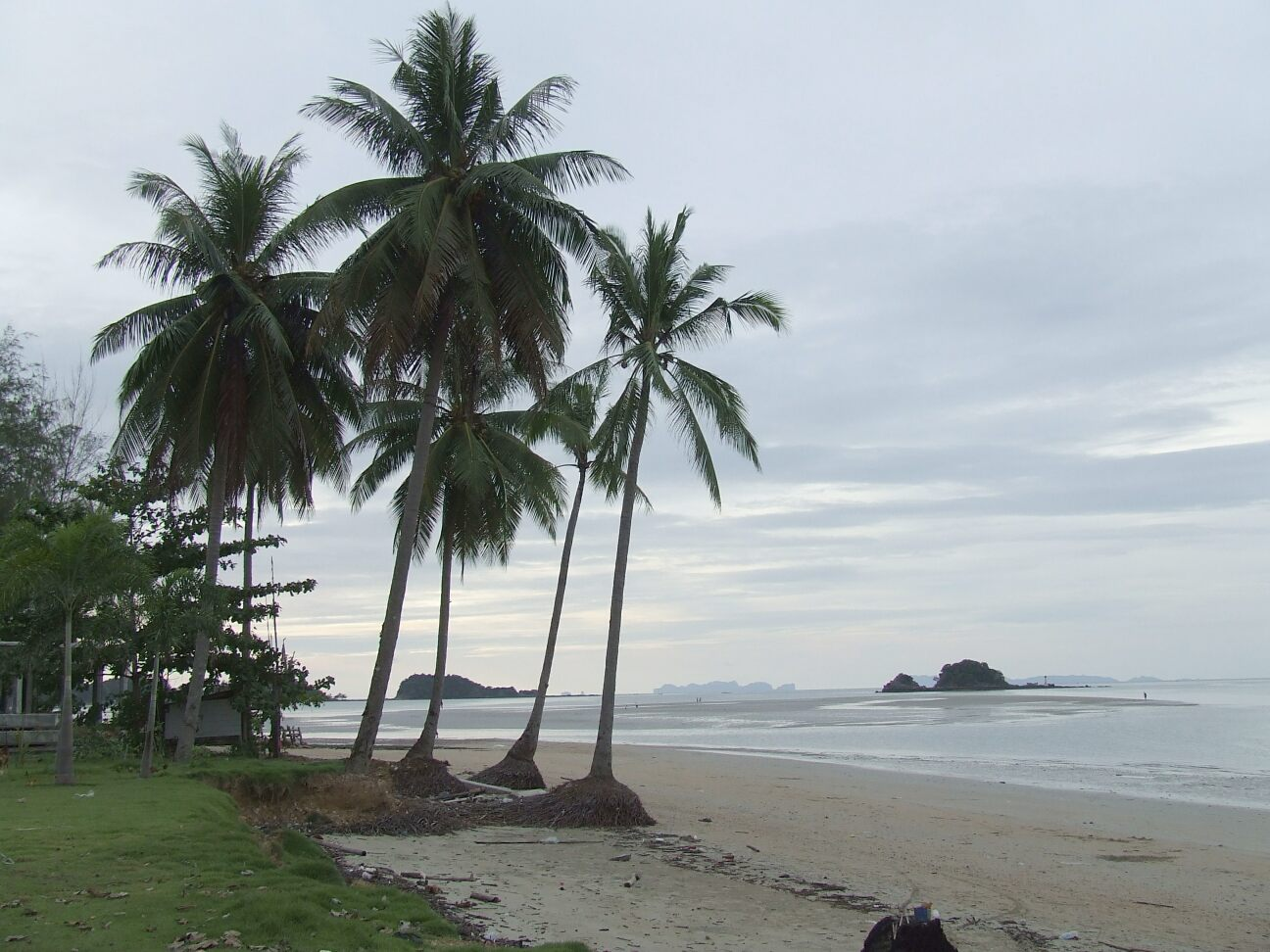
Ko Lanta Beach

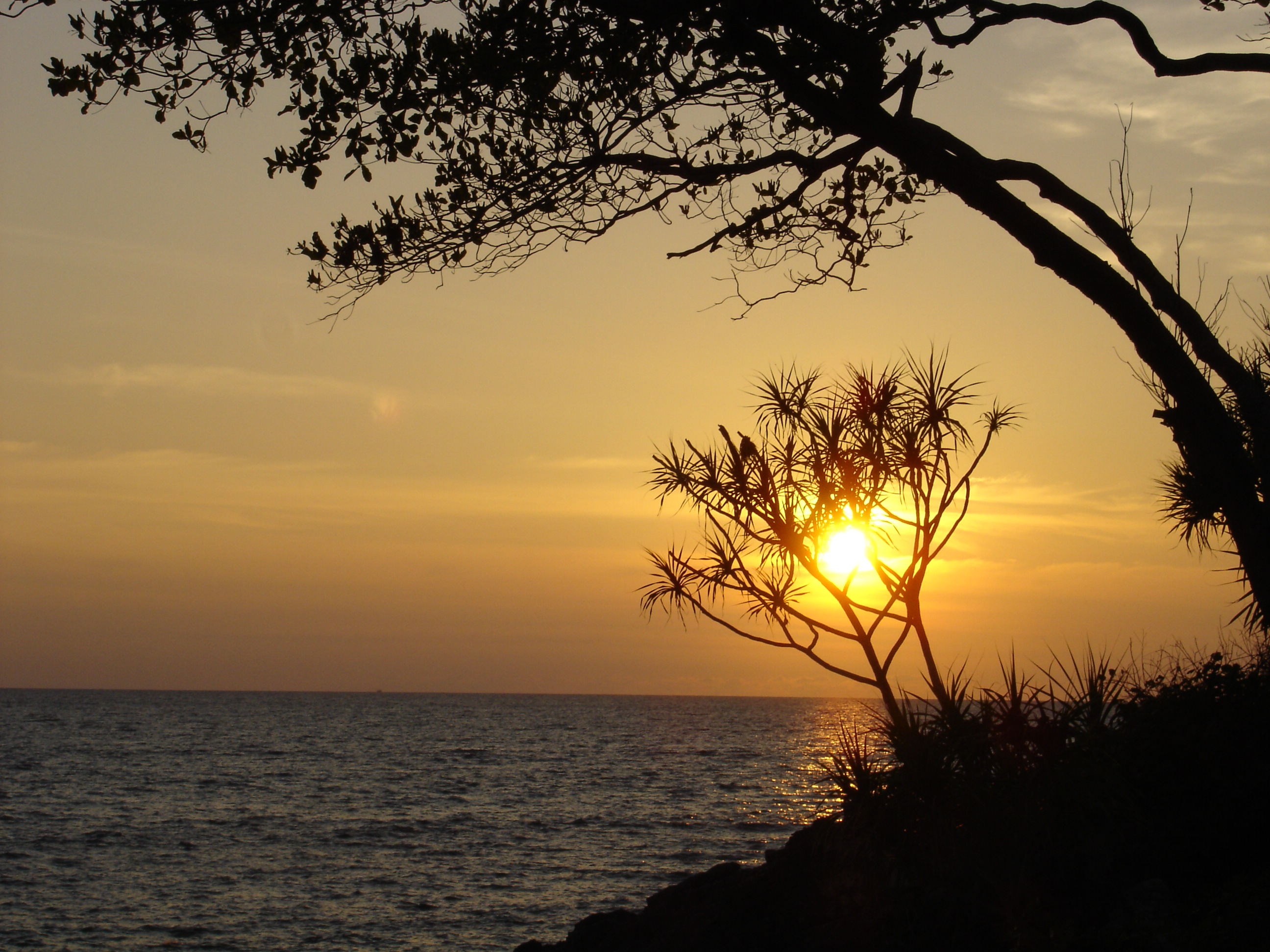
Ko Lanta

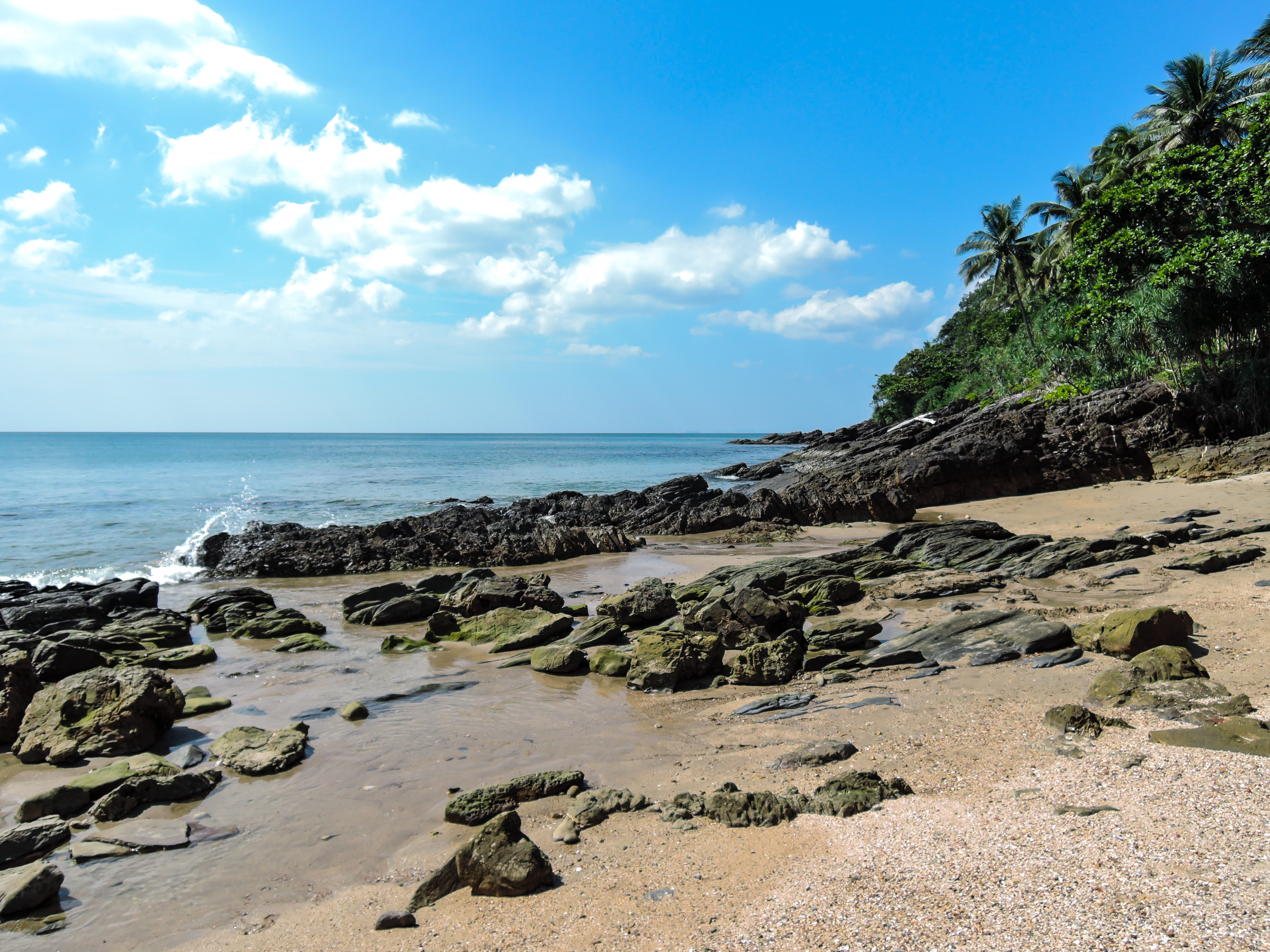
Ko Lanta

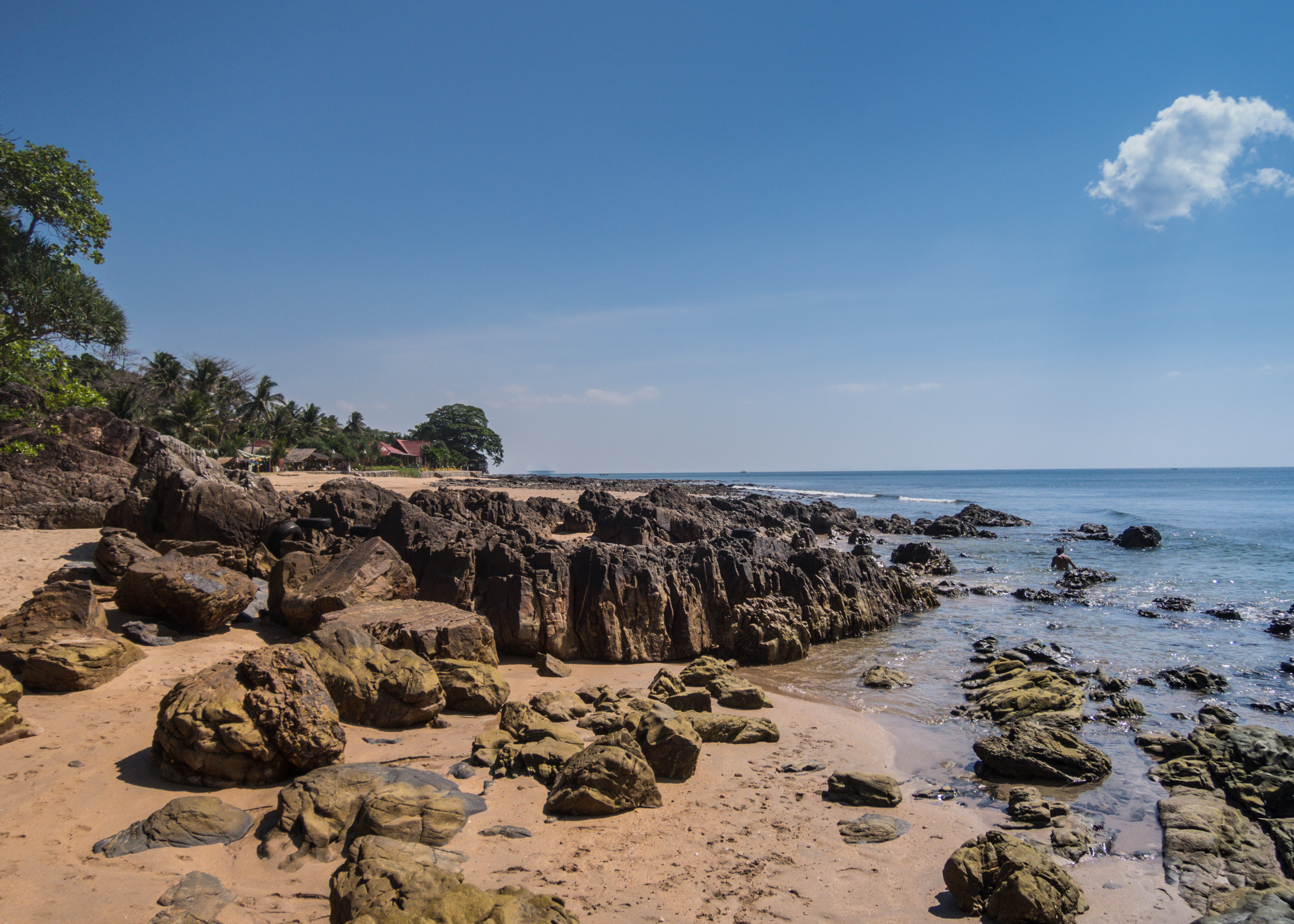
Ko Lanta

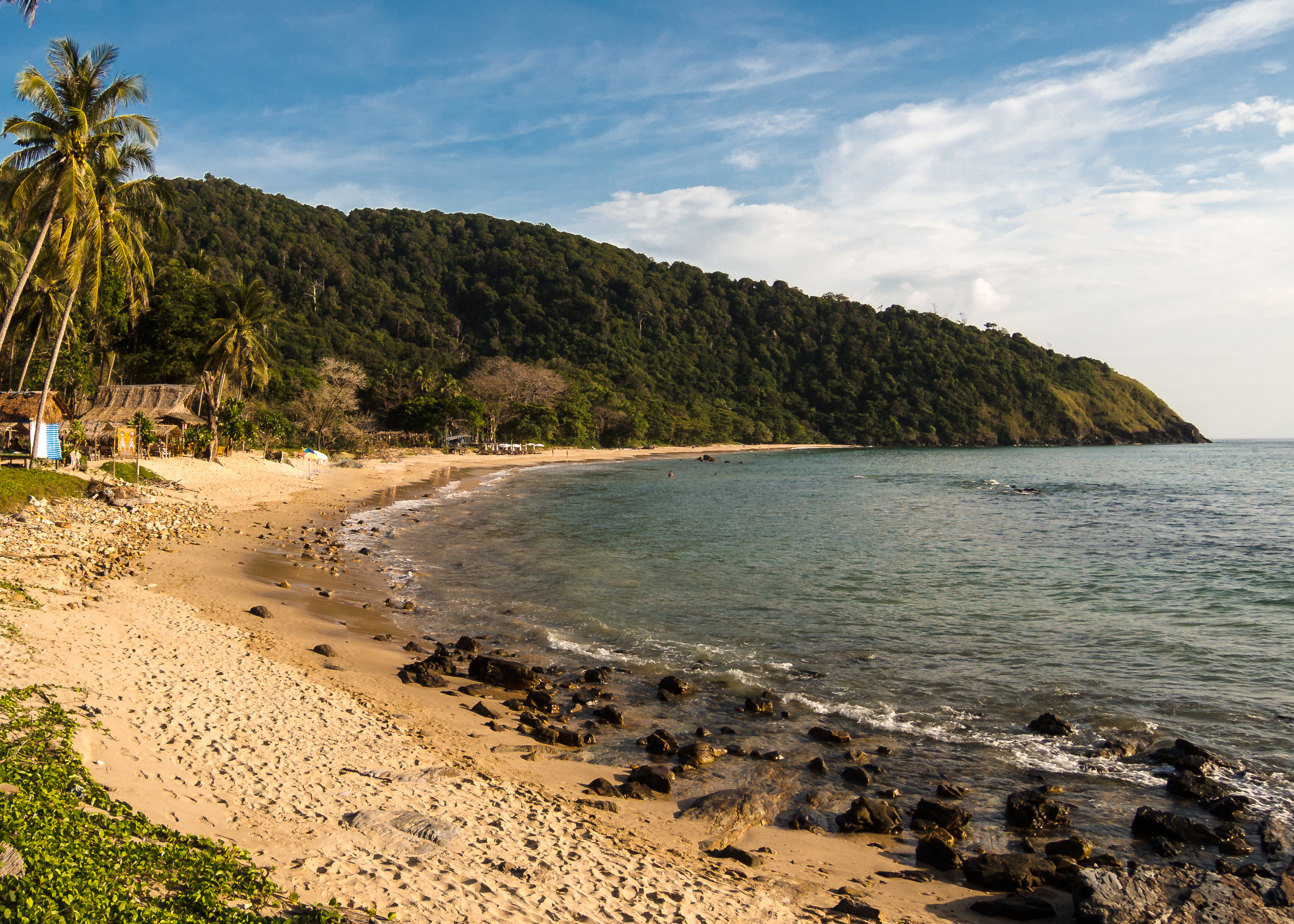
Ko Lanta

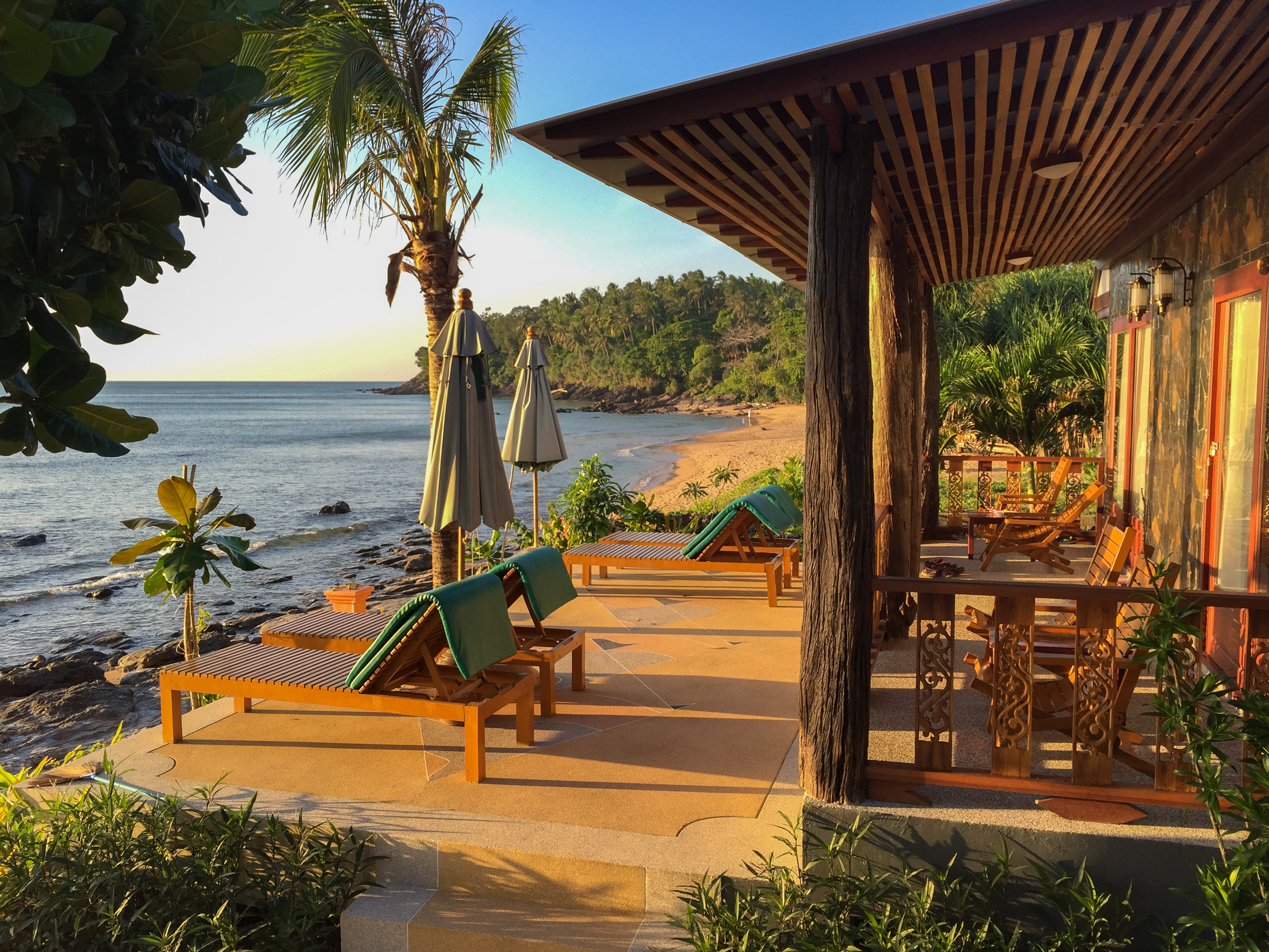
Beach house, Ko Lanta
