= Kengkla Por.Pekko =

Thai Muay Thai fighter

- Born: April 13, 1993 (age 33); Chumphon, Thailand
- Nationality: Thai
- Height: 165 cm (5 ft 5 in)
- Weight: 53 kg (117 lb; 8.3 st)
- Fighting out of: Bangkok, Thailand
- Team: Sor.Chokkitchai / Jitmuangnon

Kengkla Por.Pekko (Thai: เก่งกล้า ป.เป็กโก้) is a Thai Muay Thai fighter.

== Titles and accomplishments ==
- Lumpinee Stadium
  - Lumpinee Stadium 112 lbs Champion
  - 2014 Lumpinee Stadium 115 lbs Champion (three defenses)
- Channel 7 Stadium
  - Channel 7 Boxing Stadium 112 lbs Champion
- Professional Boxing Association of Thailand (PAT)
  - 2016 Thailand 115 lbs Champion

== Fight record ==
Muay Thai Record
Date	Result	Opponent	Event	Location	Method	Round	Time
2018-05-30	Loss	(Thailand) Phetchinaraj Sor.Sommai		Thailand	Decision	5	3:00
2018-03-31	Loss	(Thailand) Yodkrisada Yutchonburi	Omnoi Stadium	Thailand	KO	4	
2018-02-26	Win	(Thailand) Jompikart Chuwattana	Phoenix 5 Bangkok	Thailand	Decision	5	3:00
2018-01-08	Win	(Thailand) Reualuang Naveeandaman	Rajadamnern Stadium	Bangkok, Thailand	Decision	5	3:00
2017-12-16	Loss	(Thailand) Rithidet Sitchefboontham	Omnoi Boxing Stadium	Thailand	Decision	5	3:00
2017-11-01	Loss	(Thailand) Rungkit Wor.Sanprapai	Rajadamnern Stadium	Bangkok, Thailand	Decision	5	3:00
2017-08-21	Loss	(Thailand) Saksit Tor.Paopiamsapraedriew	Rajadamnern Stadium	Bangkok, Thailand	Decision	5	3:00
2017-07-23	Win	(Thailand) Panomroonglek Kratingdaenggym	Rangsit Boxing Stadium	Pathum Thani, Thailand	Decision	5	3:00
2017-05-26	Loss	(Thailand) Prakayphet Nitisamuy	Lumpinee Stadium	Bangkok, Thailand	Decision	5	3:00
2017-04-07	Loss	(Thailand) Manasak Pisinchai	Lumpinee Stadium	Bangkok, Thailand	Decision	5	3:00
2017-03-08	Loss	(Thailand) Manasak Pisinchai	Rajadamnern Stadium	Bangkok, Thailand	Decision	5	3:00
2016-12-17	Loss	(Thailand) Sprinter Pangkongprab	Lumpinee Stadium	Bangkok, Thailand	Decision	5	3:00
2016-09-17	Loss	(Thailand) Prakayphet Nitisamuy	Lumpinee Stadium	Bangkok, Thailand	KO	4	
2016-08-05	Loss	(Thailand) Wanchalong PK.Saenchai		Hat Yai, Thailand	Decision	5	3:00
2016-07-29	Loss	(Thailand) Jomhod Eminentair	Lumpinee Stadium	Bangkok, Thailand	KO	2	
2016-06-27	Win	(Thailand) Jakdao Tepkaseam	Lumpinee Stadium	Bangkok, Thailand	Decision	5	3:00
2016-06-03	Loss	(Thailand) Wanchalong PK.Saenchai	Lumpinee Stadium	Bangkok, Thailand	Decision	5	3:00
Lost Lumpinee 115 lbs title
2016-05-02	Win	(Thailand) Pichitchai PK.Saenchai	Rajadamnern Stadium	Bangkok, Thailand	Decision	5	3:00
2016-04-06	Loss	(Thailand) Kumandoi Petcharoenvit	Rajadamnern Stadium	Bangkok, Thailand	Decision	5	3:00
2016-03-16	Win	(Thailand) Wanchalong PK.Saenchai		Phra Nakhon Si Ayutthaya, Thailand	Decision	5	3:00
Wins Thailand 115 lbs title
2016-02-14	Loss	(Thailand) Fasitong Sor.Jor.Piek-Uthai	Channel 7 Boxing Stadium	Bangkok, Thailand	Decision	5	3:00
2015-12-20	Win	(Thailand) Jomhod Eminentair	Channel 7 Boxing Stadium	Bangkok, Thailand	Decision	5	3:00
2015-09-04	Win	(Thailand) Puenkol Diamond98	Lumpinee Stadium	Bangkok, Thailand	Decision	5	3:00
Defends Lumpinee Stadium 115 lbs title
2015-08-06	Win	(Thailand) Pichitchai PK.Saenchai	Rajadamnern Stadium	Bangkok, Thailand	Decision	5	3:00
2015-07-02	Loss	(Thailand) Prajanchai P.K.Saenchaimuaythaigym	Rajadamnern Stadium	Bangkok, Thailand	Decision	5	3:00
2015-06-05	Win	(Thailand) Jomhod Eminentair	Lumpinee Stadium	Bangkok, Thailand	Decision	5	3:00
Defends Lumpinee Stadium 115 lbs title
2015-04-29	Win	(Thailand) Wanchalong PK.Saenchai	Rajadamnern Stadium	Bangkok, Thailand	KO	3	
2015-04-05	Win	(Japan) Arashi Fujihara	Shuken 25	Tokyo, Japan	Decision	5	3:00
Defends Lumpinee Stadium 115 lbs title
2015-03-09	Win	(Thailand) Rungubon Eminent Air	Rajadamnern Stadium	Bangkok, Thailand	Decision	5	3:00
2015-01-15	Loss	(Thailand) Sprinter Pangkongprab	Rajadamnern Stadium	Bangkok, Thailand	Decision (Split)	5	3:00
For the vacant Rajadamnern Stadium 115 lbs title
2014-12-09	Win	(Thailand) Wanchalong PK.Saenchai	Lumpinee Stadium	Bangkok, Thailand	Decision	5	3:00
Wins Lumpinee Stadium 115 lbs title
2014-10-31	Win	(Thailand) Dapplaypun Petch.Por.Tor.Aor		Bangkok, Thailand	Decision	5	3:00
2014-09-30	Loss	(Thailand) Wanchalong PK.Saenchai	Lumpinee Stadium	Thailand	Decision	5	3:00
2014-09-09	Win	(Thailand) Dapplaypun Petch.Por.Tor.Aor	Lumpinee Stadium	Bangkok, Thailand	Decision	5	3:00
2014-08-08	Win	(Thailand) Jomhod Eminentair	Lumpinee Stadium	Bangkok, Thailand	Decision	5	3:00
2014-07-17	Win	(Thailand) Wanchalong PK.Saenchai		Thailand	Decision	5	3:00
2014-06-06	Win	(Thailand) Gusagonnoi Sor.Joonsen	Lumpinee Stadium	Bangkok, Thailand	Decision	5	3:00
2014-03-18	Win	(Thailand) Phet Aor.Phimonsri	Lumpinee Stadium	Bangkok, Thailand	Decision	5	3:00
2014-02-25	Win	(Thailand) Visanlek Seatrandiscovery	Lumpinee Stadium	Bangkok, Thailand	Decision	5	3:00
2014-01-28	Loss	(Thailand) Prakayphet Nitisamuy	Lumpinee Stadium	Bangkok, Thailand	Decision	5	3:00
2013-12-27	Draw	(Thailand) Phet Aor.Phimonsri	Lumpinee Stadium	Bangkok, Thailand	Decision	5	3:00
2013-11-15	Loss	(Thailand) Nuengthep Sagami	Lumpinee Stadium	Bangkok, Thailand	Decision	5	3:00
2013-07-16	Win	(Thailand) Phet Aor.Phimonsri	Lumpinee Stadium	Bangkok, Thailand	Decision	5	3:00
2013-06-09	Loss	(Thailand) Wanchalong PK.Saenchai	Channel 7 Boxing Stadium	Bangkok, Thailand	Decision	5	3:00
For the Channel 7 Boxing Stadium 115 lbs title
2013-05-07	Win	(Thailand) Wanchalong PK.Saenchai	Lumpinee Stadium	Bangkok, Thailand	Decision	5	3:00
2013-04-09	Loss	(Thailand) Wanchana Or Boonchay	Lumpinee Stadium	Bangkok, Thailand	Decision	5	3:00
2012-11-27	Loss	(Thailand) Pongrit Chor Churngamon	Lumpinee Stadium	Bangkok, Thailand	Decision	5	3:00
2012-11-06	Win	(Thailand) Muangthai PKSaenchaimuaythaigym	Lumpinee Stadium	Bangkok, Thailand	Decision	5	3:00
2012-08-14	Win	(Thailand) Cheabkom Sitjaagun	Lumpinee Stadium	Bangkok, Thailand	Decision	5	3:00
2012-05-15	Loss	(Thailand) Muangthai PKSaenchaimuaythaigym	Lumpinee Stadium	Bangkok, Thailand	TKO	3	
2012-03-27	Win	(Thailand) Songkom Sakhomsin	Lumpinee Stadium	Bangkok, Thailand	TKO (High Kick)	3	
2012-03-06	Win	(Thailand) Kan Kor.Kampanat	Lumpinee Stadium	Bangkok, Thailand	Decision	5	3:00
2012-01-13	Loss	(Thailand) Kan Kor.Kampanat	Lumpinee Stadium	Bangkok, Thailand	Decision	5	3:00
2011-11-11	Draw	(Thailand) Prakaipet EminentAir	Lumpinee Stadium	Bangkok, Thailand	Decision	5	3:00
2011-06-19	Loss	(Thailand) Kusakornnoi Sitphetubon	Channel 7 Boxing Stadium	Bangkok, Thailand	Decision	5	3:00
2011-01-09	Loss	(Thailand) Pentai Singpatong	Channel 7 Boxing Stadium	Bangkok, Thailand	Decision	5	3:00
For the Channel 7 Boxing Stadium 108 lbs title
2010-08-27	Win	(Thailand) Chucharoen Wiriyafarm	Lumpinee Stadium	Bangkok, Thailand	Decision	5	3:00
2009-09-22	Win	(Thailand) Monkhao Sitjaphan	Lumpinee Stadium	Bangkok, Thailand	Decision	5	3:00
Legend: Win Loss Draw/No contest Notes
