= Mongkolchai Kwaitonggym =

Thai Muay Thai fighter

- Born: 1992 (age 33–34); Roi Et province, Thailand
- Other names: Mongkolchai Diamond98; Mongkolchai Skindewgym (มงคลชัย สกินเดียวยิม)
- Nationality: Thai
- Height: 168 cm (5 ft 6 in)
- Weight: 57.0 kg (125.7 lb; 8.98 st)
- Style: Muay Thai
- Fighting out of: Bangkok, Thailand
- Team: Kiatpetch Gym

Mongkolchai Kwaitonggym (มงคลชัย ควายทองยิม) is a retired Thai Muay Thai fighter.

== Titles and accomplishments ==
- 2009 Channel 7 Boxing Stadium 108 lbs Champion
- 2010 Lumpinee Stadium 108 lbs Champion
- 2018 Channel 7 Stadium 126 lbs Champion
- 2019 Samui Festival Featherweight Champion

== Fight record ==
Kickboxing record
Date	Result	Opponent	Event	Location	Method	Round	Time
2020-12-20	Loss	(Thailand) Dieselnoi Sor.Damnern	Channel 7 Boxing Stadium	Bangkok, Thailand	Decision	5	3:00
2020-09-19	Win	(Thailand) Dieselnoi Sor.Damnern	SorJor.Lekmuangnon + Sor.Chokmeechai, Or.Tor.Gor 3 Stadium	Nonthaburi, Thailand	Decision	5	3:00
2019-11-14	Loss	(Thailand) Chalam Parunchai	Rajadamnern Stadium	Bangkok, Thailand	Decision	5	3:00
2019-09-13	Win	(Thailand) Klasuek Phetjinda	Samui Festival	Ko Samui, Thailand	Decision	5	3:00
Wins Samui Festival Featherweight title
2019-04-07	Loss	(Thailand) Klasuek Phetjinda	Channel 7 Boxing Stadium	Bangkok, Thailand	KO	4	
Lost Channel 7 Boxing Stadium 126lbs title
2019-01-10	Loss	(Thailand) Lamnamoonlek Or.Atchariya	Rajadamnern Stadium	Bangkok, Thailand	Decision	5	3:00
2018-09-13	Loss	(Thailand) Rungkit Wor.Sanprapai	Rajadamnern Stadium	Bangkok, Thailand	TKO	3	2:55
2018-08-09	Draw	(Thailand) Petchdam Petchyindee Academy	Rajadamnern Stadium	Bangkok, Thailand	Decision	5	3:00
2018-06-25	Win	(Thailand) Chalam Parunchai	Birthday Nayok-A-Thasala + Kiatpetch	Nakhon Si Thammarat Province, Thailand	Decision	5	3:00
2018-05-11	Win	(Thailand) Siwagon Kiatjaroenchai	Kiatpetch Super Fight + Sor.Dechapan	Satun Province, Thailand	Decision	5	3:00
2018-03-28	Win	(Thailand) Sing Parunchai	WanParunchai + Poonseua Sanjorn	Nakhon Si Thammarat Province, Thailand	Decision	5	3:00
2018-02-04	Win	(Thailand) Siwagon Kiatjaroenchai	Channel 7 Boxing Stadium	Bangkok, Thailand	Decision	5	3:00
Wins Channel 7 Boxing Stadium 126lbs title
2017-09-09	Loss	(Thailand) Tawanchai PK Saenchaimuaythaigym	Lumpinee Stadium	Bangkok, Thailand	Decision	5	3:00
2017-08-06	Win	(Thailand) Tawanchai PK Saenchaimuaythaigym	Channel 7 Boxing Stadium	Bangkok, Thailand	Decision	5	3:00
2017-07-01	Win	(Thailand) Senkeng Kelasport	Lumpinee Stadium	Bangkok, Thailand	Decision	5	3:00
2017-01-26	Loss	(Thailand) Phetwason Or.Daokrajai	Rajadamnern Stadium	Bangkok, Thailand	Decision	5	3:00
2016-08-07	Win	(Thailand) Prakaipetch Nitisamui	Komchadluek Stadium	Nonthaburi, Thailand	Decision	5	3:00
2015-10-30	Loss	(Thailand) Suakim PK Saenchaimuaythaigym	Lumpinee Stadium	Bangkok, Thailand	KO	3	
2015-06-28	Win	(Thailand) Suakim PK Saenchaimuaythaigym	Channel 7 Boxing Stadium	Bangkok, Thailand	Decision	5	3:00
Wins Channel 7 Boxing Stadium 122lbs title
2015-05-10	Win	(Thailand) Kongkiat Thor.Pran49	Channel 7 Boxing Stadium	Bangkok, Thailand	Decision	5	3:00
2013-07-09	Loss	(Thailand) Sangmanee Sor Tienpo	Lumpinee Stadium	Bangkok, Thailand	KO (Left Body Knee)	4	3:00
2013-06-04	Win	(Thailand) Suakim PK Saenchaimuaythaigym	Lumpinee Stadium	Bangkok, Thailand	Decision	5	3:00
2013-02-07	Loss	(Thailand) Nong-O Gaiyanghadao	Rajadamnern Stadium	Bangkok, Thailand	TKO	5	
2013-02-05	Loss	(Thailand) Phet Utong Or. Kwanmuang	Lumpinee Stadium	Bangkok, Thailand	Decision	5	3:00
2012-12-14	Win	(Thailand) Tuan Kor Kumpanart	Lumpinee Stadium	Bangkok, Thailand	Decision	5	3:00
2012-12-07	Loss	(Thailand) Sagetdao Petpayathai	Lumpinee Stadium	Bangkok, Thailand	Decision	5	3:00
2012-09-12	Win	(Thailand) Parnphet Chor.NaPatalung	Rajadamnern Stadium	Bangkok, Thailand	Decision	5	3:00
2012-08-14	Loss	(Thailand) Kaotam Lookprabaht	Lumpinee Stadium	Bangkok, Thailand	TKO (Low Kick)		
2012-06-22	Loss	(Thailand) Kaotam Lookprabaht	Lumpinee Stadium	Bangkok, Thailand	Decision	5	3:00
2012-05-17	Loss	(Thailand) Pakorn PKSaenchaimuaythaigym	Rajadamnern Stadium	Bangkok, Thailand	Decision	5	3:00
2012-03-30	Win	(Thailand) Phetmorakot Petchyindee Academy	Lumpinee Stadium	Bangkok, Thailand	Decision	5	3:00
2012-02-28	Win	(Thailand) Singtongnoi Por.Telakun	Lumpinee Stadium	Bangkok, Thailand	TKO (Doctor Stoppage)		
2012-01-29	Win	(Thailand) Wanchalong PK.Saenchai	Channel 7 Boxing Stadium	Bangkok, Thailand	Decision	5	3:00
2011-12-09	Win	(Thailand) Phetmorakot Petchyindee Academy	Lumpinee Stadium	Bangkok, Thailand	Decision	5	3:00
2011-08-04	Loss	(Thailand) Nong-O Gaiyanghadao	Toyota Vigo Marathon, Channel 7 Boxing Stadium	Bangkok, Thailand	Decision	3	3:00
2011-06-19	Win	(Thailand) Mankao Chor.Chanmanee	Channel 7 Boxing Stadium	Bangkok, Thailand	Decision	5	3:00
2011-03-17	Win	(Thailand) Palangpol Chuwattana	Rajadamnern Stadium	Bangkok, Thailand	Decision	5	3:00
2010-11-12	Loss	(Thailand) Wirachai Wor.Wiwattananon	Lumpinee Stadium	Bangkok, Thailand	KO	1	
2010-09-24	Win	(Thailand) Wanchalong PK.Saenchai	Lumpinee Stadium	Bangkok, Thailand	Decision	5	3:00
Wins Lumpinee Stadium 108lbs title
2010-07-20	Win	(Thailand) Wanchalong PK.Saenchai	Lumpinee Stadium	Bangkok, Thailand	Decision	5	3:00
2010-06-10	Loss	(Thailand) Manasak Sitniwat	Rajadamnern Stadium	Bangkok, Thailand	TKO	3	
2010-05-07	Loss	(Thailand) Jomthong Chuwattana	Suek Petchpiya, Lumpinee Stadium	Bangkok, Thailand	KO (Punch)	4	
2010-02-26	Loss	(Thailand) Wanchalong PK.Saenchai	Lumpinee Stadium	Bangkok, Thailand	TKO	2	
2010-01-03	Win	(Thailand) Monchailek Sor. Sommai	Channel 7 Boxing Stadium	Bangkok, Thailand	KO (Left Elbow)	3	
2009	Win	(Thailand) Weerachai	Lumpinee Stadium	Bangkok, Thailand	KO	4	
2009-07-03	Win	(Thailand) Pettawee Sor Kittichai	Lumpinee Stadium	Bangkok, Thailand	Decision	5	3:00
2009	Win	(Thailand) Kusagonnoi Sitpetchubon	Channel 7 Boxing Stadium	Bangkok, Thailand	Decision	5	3:00
Wins Channel 7 Boxing Stadium 108lbs title
Legend: Win Loss Draw/No contest Notes
