= Ko Klang, Mueang Krabi =

Island in Krabi Province, Thailand

Ko Klang
Native name: เกาะกลาง
- Interactive map of Ko Klang

Geography
- Location: Strait of Malacca
- Coordinates: 8.040640°N 98.937093°E
- Area: 14.1 km^{2} (5.4 sq mi)

Administration
- Thailand
- Province: Krabi
- District: Mueang Krabi
- Tambon: Khlong Prasong

Demographics
- Population: 5,000 (2017)
- Languages: Thai, Southern Thai

Additional information
- Time zone: ICT (UTC+7)
- Postal code: 81000

Ko Klang (Thai: เกาะกลาง) is an island in southern Thailand. It is located in the tambon of Khlong Prasong, Mueang Krabi District, Krabi Province, Thailand. The residents are primarily Thai Muslims.

== Geography ==
Ko Klang is located at the mouth of the Krabi River and near the town of Krabi. The island is accessible via long tail boat rides through the Mangrove forests of the area. The island is transected by multiple waterways, and many of the local residences are constructed on decks or piers along the waterfront.

== Demographics ==
As of 2017, population of the island was approximately 5,000 individuals and 915 families, 70% of who are native to the island. 90% of the residents are Muslims, with the remaining 10% identifying as Buddhists or other religions.

== Economy ==
Ko Klang's economy includes marine transportation and rice farming. There is also a local handicraft industry which among other things includes handmade Batik textiles. Many of these crafts are sold to tourists.

== Environment ==
80% of Ko Klang is covered with mangrove forests which are home to many local animal species. The island also contains swampland which is home to aquatic creatures.

== Climate ==
The annual precipitation in Ko Klang is 1454.4 mm. The hottest and coldest months are June and January, respectively; the wettest month is November; and the windiest month is February.
