= Ko Lanta Yai =

Thai island

Native name: เกาะลันตาใหญ่
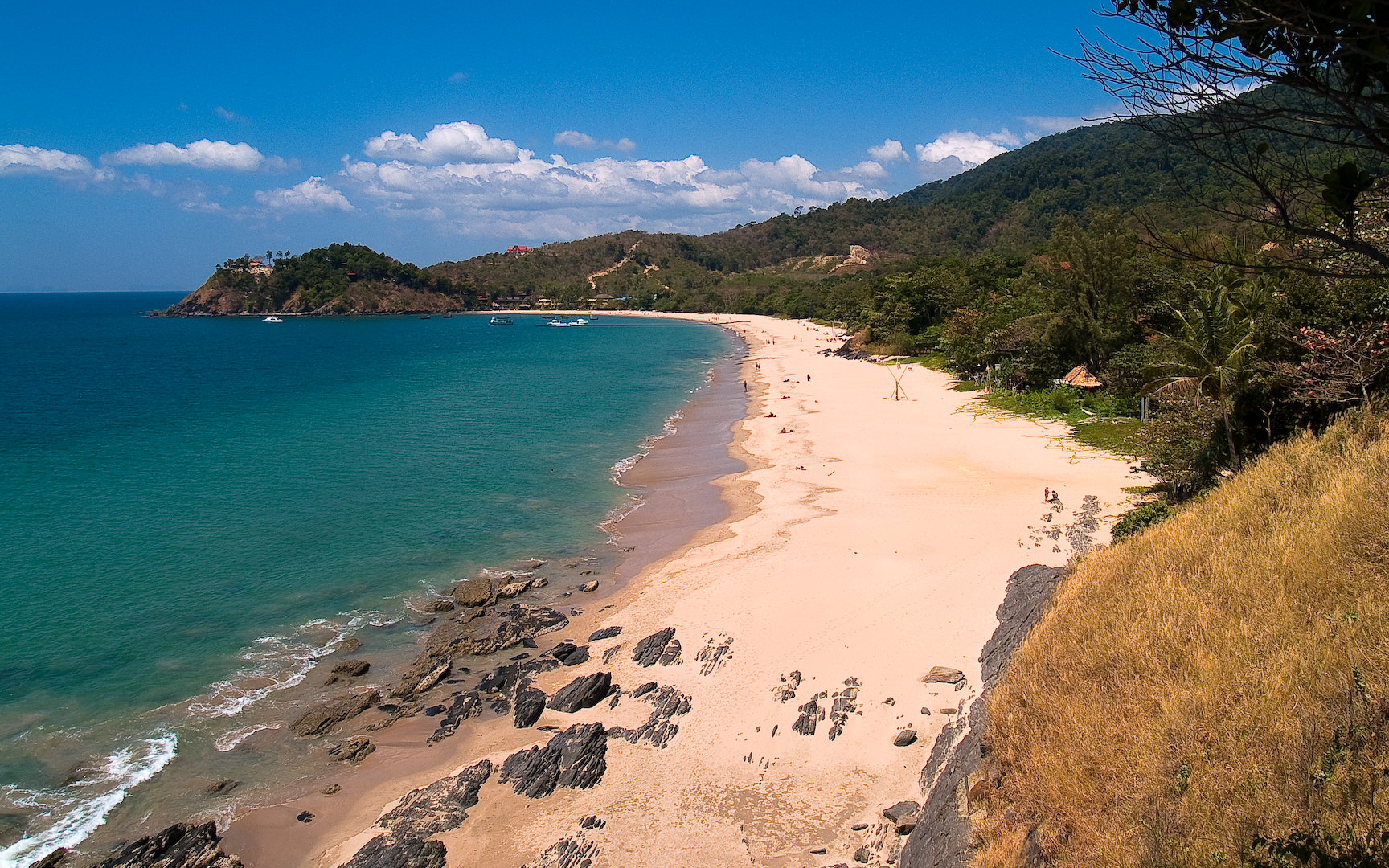
- Kantiang Bay in southern Ko Lanta Yai
- Interactive map of Ko Lanta Yai

Geography
- Location: Strait of Malacca
- Coordinates: 7°35′0″N 99°03′0″E
- Archipelago: Lanta Islands
- Area: 81 km^{2} (31 sq mi)

Administration
- Thailand
- Province: Krabi
- District: Ko Lanta
- Tambon: Saladan (North); Ko Lanta Yai (South)

Demographics
- Population: 10,830 (2012)
- Languages: Thai, Southern Thai

Additional information
- Time zone: ICT (UTC+7)
- Postal code: 81150

Ko Lanta Yai (Thai: เกาะลันตาใหญ่, lit. 'Big Lanta Island') is an island in the Strait of Malacca off the west coast of Thailand, between the Phi Phi Islands and the mainland. It is administratively part of Krabi Province, most of which is on the mainland. Together with neighboring Ko Lanta Noi (Small Lanta Island), which forms the Ko Lanta archipelago, and several other islands, it forms the amphoe of Ko Lanta District.

== Toponymy ==
Ko Lanta was once known by its Malay name, "Pulao Satak", which means "Long Beach Island". Later, many Thais, both Buddhist and Muslim, moved to the island making the island known as the island of "a million eyes" ("lan ta" in Thai). The name may also be derived from the Javanese "lan-tas", or fish grill (built of wood with a square grill on top where the fish are placed in a circle).

== Geography ==
The island is 25 km (16 mi) long and 6 km (3.7 mi) wide, with an area of 81 km^{2} (31 mi^{2}), and a small portion of it belongs to the Mu Ko Lanta National Park. The area was designated as the 62nd national park of Thailand in 1990. The island is relatively less developed, with most of the accommodation available being basic bamboo huts. In 2015, a bridge replaced the ferry crossing to the island of Ko Lanta Noi, though as of 2024 the ferry that in turn connects Lanta Noi to the mainland remains. There are few paved roads on the island, mostly in the north, and they deteriorate gradually in the southern half of the island.

Ban Saladan, the main town and port, is at the northern tip of the island and is served by ferries to Koh Ngai and Phi Phi. The main beaches are on the western shores of the island, the largest being Klong Dao, Pra-Ae (Long Beach), and Klong Khong Beach. There are other, much less accessible, beaches at the southern end. The administrative center as well as home to most Moken or Chao Ley ("Sea people") is Old Town, located roughly 2/3rds down the much-less developed east coast.

Lanta escaped the worst of the 2004 Indian Ocean earthquake. Although there was widespread devastation along the west coast, significantly fewer injuries and fatalities were reported in comparison to the Phi Phi Islands. It is reported that 11 people lost their lives. Assisted by tourists, most businesses were up and running within a few days.

The French television show Koh-Lanta is named after the island, where its first season was filmed.
