= 2023 in ONE Championship =

Mixed martial arts events

Information
- First date: January 14, 2023
- Last date: December 22, 2023

Events
- Total events: 58
- ONE Fight Night: 12
- ONE Friday Fights: 46

Fights
- Total fights: 550
- Title fights: 30

The year 2023 was the 13th year in the history of the ONE Championship, a mixed martial arts, kickboxing, Muay Thai and submission grappling promotion based in Cayman Islands.

== Events list ==
=== Past events ===
#	Event	Date	Venue	City	Country	Ref.	Performance of the Night		Bonus	Ref.
281	ONE Friday Fights 46: Tawanchai vs. Superbon	December 22, 2023	Lumpinee Boxing Stadium	Bangkok	Thailand		Prajanchai P.K.Saenchai	—N/a	$50,000	
281	ONE Friday Fights 46: Tawanchai vs. Superbon	December 22, 2023	Lumpinee Boxing Stadium	Bangkok	Thailand		Kulabdam Sor.Jor.Piek-U-Thai	Jaosuayai Sor.Dechapan	$10,000	
281	ONE Friday Fights 46: Tawanchai vs. Superbon	December 22, 2023	Lumpinee Boxing Stadium	Bangkok	Thailand		Phetsukumvit Boybangna	Suablack Tor.Pran49	$10,000	
281	ONE Friday Fights 46: Tawanchai vs. Superbon	December 22, 2023	Lumpinee Boxing Stadium	Bangkok	Thailand		Chorfah Tor.Sangtiennoi	Suriyanlek Por.Yenying	$10,000	
280	ONE Friday Fights 45: Otop vs. Şen	December 15, 2023	Lumpinee Boxing Stadium	Bangkok	Thailand		Soner Şen	Chartpayak Saksatun	$10,000	
280	ONE Friday Fights 45: Otop vs. Şen	December 15, 2023	Lumpinee Boxing Stadium	Bangkok	Thailand		Pettasuea Seeopal	Charlie Singha Mawynn	$10,000	
280	ONE Friday Fights 45: Otop vs. Şen	December 15, 2023	Lumpinee Boxing Stadium	Bangkok	Thailand		Furkan Karabağ	—N/a	$10,000	
279	ONE Fight Night 17: Kryklia vs. Roberts	December 9, 2023	Lumpinee Boxing Stadium	Bangkok	Thailand		Roman Kryklia	Dmitry Menshikov	$50,000	
279	ONE Fight Night 17: Kryklia vs. Roberts	December 9, 2023	Lumpinee Boxing Stadium	Bangkok	Thailand		Jacob Smith	—N/a	$50,000	
278	ONE Friday Fights 44: Yod-IQ vs. Musaev	December 8, 2023	Lumpinee Boxing Stadium	Bangkok	Thailand		Pompetch P.K.Saenchai	Maisangkum Sor. Yingcharoenkarnchang	$10,000	
278	ONE Friday Fights 44: Yod-IQ vs. Musaev	December 8, 2023	Lumpinee Boxing Stadium	Bangkok	Thailand		Ganchai Jitmuangnon	Sungprab Lookpichit	$10,000	
277	ONE Friday Fights 43: Kongsuk vs. Pettonglor	December 1, 2023	Lumpinee Boxing Stadium	Bangkok	Thailand		Kongthoranee Sor.Sommai	Petchnamkhong Mongkolpetch	$10,000	
277	ONE Friday Fights 43: Kongsuk vs. Pettonglor	December 1, 2023	Lumpinee Boxing Stadium	Bangkok	Thailand		Aslamjon Ortikov	Mustafa Al Tekreeti	$10,000	
276	ONE Friday Fights 42: Kaonar vs. Lobo	November 24, 2023	Lumpinee Boxing Stadium	Bangkok	Thailand		Khunponnoi Sor.Sommai	Sornsueknoi FA Group	$10,000	
276	ONE Friday Fights 42: Kaonar vs. Lobo	November 24, 2023	Lumpinee Boxing Stadium	Bangkok	Thailand		Kongkairop FiatPathum	Yu Yau Pui	$10,000	
275	ONE Friday Fights 41: Dedduanglek vs. Nakrob	November 17, 2023	Lumpinee Boxing Stadium	Bangkok	Thailand		Nakrob Fairtex	Songchainoi Kiatsongrit	$10,000	
275	ONE Friday Fights 41: Dedduanglek vs. Nakrob	November 17, 2023	Lumpinee Boxing Stadium	Bangkok	Thailand		Suriyanlek Por.Yenying	Parnpet Sor.Jor.Lekmuangnon	$10,000	
275	ONE Friday Fights 41: Dedduanglek vs. Nakrob	November 17, 2023	Lumpinee Boxing Stadium	Bangkok	Thailand		Yodnumchai Fairtex	—N/a	$10,000	
274	ONE Friday Fights 40: Jaosuayai vs. Paidang	November 10, 2023	Lumpinee Boxing Stadium	Bangkok	Thailand		Jaosuayai Sor.Dechapan	Aliff Sor.Dechapan	$10,000	
274	ONE Friday Fights 40: Jaosuayai vs. Paidang	November 10, 2023	Lumpinee Boxing Stadium	Bangkok	Thailand		Khunsuk Sor.Dechapan	Ricardo Bravo	$10,000	
274	ONE Friday Fights 40: Jaosuayai vs. Paidang	November 10, 2023	Lumpinee Boxing Stadium	Bangkok	Thailand		Parham Gheiratimarkeye	—N/a	$10,000	
273	ONE Fight Night 16: Haggerty vs. Andrade	November 4, 2023	Lumpinee Boxing Stadium	Bangkok	Thailand		Jonathan Haggerty	—N/a	$100,000	
273	ONE Fight Night 16: Haggerty vs. Andrade	November 4, 2023	Lumpinee Boxing Stadium	Bangkok	Thailand		Tye Ruotolo	Ben Tynan	$50,000	
273	ONE Fight Night 16: Haggerty vs. Andrade	November 4, 2023	Lumpinee Boxing Stadium	Bangkok	Thailand		Cristina Morales	—N/a	$50,000	
272	ONE Friday Fights 39: Kongklai vs. Şen	November 3, 2023	Lumpinee Boxing Stadium	Bangkok	Thailand		Soner Şen	ET Tded99	$10,000	
272	ONE Friday Fights 39: Kongklai vs. Şen	November 3, 2023	Lumpinee Boxing Stadium	Bangkok	Thailand		Jack Jackmuaythai Gym	Nongchamp Luckybantermg	$10,000	
272	ONE Friday Fights 39: Kongklai vs. Şen	November 3, 2023	Lumpinee Boxing Stadium	Bangkok	Thailand		Amnuaydet Wor.Wantawee	Longern Paesaisee	$10,000	
271	ONE Friday Fights 38: Otop vs. Musaev	October 27, 2023	Lumpinee Boxing Stadium	Bangkok	Thailand		Ilyas Musaev	Puengluang Baanramba	$10,000	
271	ONE Friday Fights 38: Otop vs. Musaev	October 27, 2023	Lumpinee Boxing Stadium	Bangkok	Thailand		Petchgarfield Jitmuangnon	Numpangna EagleMuayThai	$10,000	
271	ONE Friday Fights 38: Otop vs. Musaev	October 27, 2023	Lumpinee Boxing Stadium	Bangkok	Thailand		Yodsingdam Kiatkamthorn	Lenny Blasi	$10,000	
271	ONE Friday Fights 38: Otop vs. Musaev	October 27, 2023	Lumpinee Boxing Stadium	Bangkok	Thailand		Fritz Aldin Biagtan	—N/a	$10,000	
270	ONE Friday Fights 37: Bohic vs. Kacem	October 20, 2023	Lumpinee Boxing Stadium	Bangkok	Thailand		Rittidet Sor.Sommai	Lamnamkhong BS.MuayThai	$10,000	
270	ONE Friday Fights 37: Bohic vs. Kacem	October 20, 2023	Lumpinee Boxing Stadium	Bangkok	Thailand		Kaoklai Chor.Hapayak	Elyes Kacem	$10,000	
269	ONE Fight Night 15: Le vs. Freymanov	October 7, 2023	Lumpinee Boxing Stadium	Bangkok	Thailand		Thanh Le	Mikey Musumeci	$50,000	
269	ONE Fight Night 15: Le vs. Freymanov	October 7, 2023	Lumpinee Boxing Stadium	Bangkok	Thailand		Zhang Lipeng	—N/a	$50,000	
268	ONE Friday Fights 36: Superball vs. Lobo	October 6, 2023	Lumpinee Boxing Stadium	Bangkok	Thailand		Rambong Sor.Therapat	Petchdam Petchkiatpetch	$10,000	
268	ONE Friday Fights 36: Superball vs. Lobo	October 6, 2023	Lumpinee Boxing Stadium	Bangkok	Thailand		Petchsaenchai MUden-Khonmaibawwee	Johan Ghazali	$10,000	
268	ONE Friday Fights 36: Superball vs. Lobo	October 6, 2023	Lumpinee Boxing Stadium	Bangkok	Thailand		Kirill Khomutov	—N/a	$10,000	
267	ONE Fight Night 14: Stamp vs. Ham	September 30, 2023	Singapore Indoor Stadium	Kallang	Singapore		Stamp Fairtex	Smilla Sundell	$50,000	
267	ONE Fight Night 14: Stamp vs. Ham	September 30, 2023	Singapore Indoor Stadium	Kallang	Singapore		Asa Ten Pow	—N/a	$50,000	
266	ONE Friday Fights 35: Kongsuk vs. Dedduanglek	September 29, 2023	Lumpinee Boxing Stadium	Bangkok	Thailand		Black Panther	Suriyanlek Por.Yenying	$10,000	
266	ONE Friday Fights 35: Kongsuk vs. Dedduanglek	September 29, 2023	Lumpinee Boxing Stadium	Bangkok	Thailand		Batman Or.Atchariya	Sakaengam Jitmuangnon	$10,000	
266	ONE Friday Fights 35: Kongsuk vs. Dedduanglek	September 29, 2023	Lumpinee Boxing Stadium	Bangkok	Thailand		Phetchumpae Highland Gym	—N/a	$10,000	
265	ONE Friday Fights 34: Rodtang vs. Superlek	September 22, 2023	Lumpinee Boxing Stadium	Bangkok	Thailand		Suakim Sor.Jor.Tongprajin	—N/a	$20,000	
265	ONE Friday Fights 34: Rodtang vs. Superlek	September 22, 2023	Lumpinee Boxing Stadium	Bangkok	Thailand		Muangthai P.K.Saenchai	Yodlekpet Or. Atchariya	$10,000	
265	ONE Friday Fights 34: Rodtang vs. Superlek	September 22, 2023	Lumpinee Boxing Stadium	Bangkok	Thailand		Miguel Trindade	Songchainoi Kiatsongrit	$10,000	
264	ONE Friday Fights 33: Yod-IQ vs. Balyko	September 15, 2023	Lumpinee Boxing Stadium	Bangkok	Thailand		Tubtimthong Sor.Jor.Lekmuangnon	Yodnumchai Fairtex	$10,000	
264	ONE Friday Fights 33: Yod-IQ vs. Balyko	September 15, 2023	Lumpinee Boxing Stadium	Bangkok	Thailand		Otop Or.Kwanmuang	Yamin P.K.Saenchai	$10,000	
263	ONE Friday Fights 32: Kompetch vs. Kongchai	September 8, 2023	Lumpinee Boxing Stadium	Bangkok	Thailand		Nabil Anane	Suablack Tor.Pran49	$10,000	
263	ONE Friday Fights 32: Kompetch vs. Kongchai	September 8, 2023	Lumpinee Boxing Stadium	Bangkok	Thailand		Rhuam Felipe Morais Caldas	—N/a	$10,000	
262	ONE Friday Fights 31: Kongthoranee vs. Kabutov	September 1, 2023	Lumpinee Boxing Stadium	Bangkok	Thailand		Chorfah Tor.Sangtiennoi	Sibsan Nokkhao KorMor11	$10,000	
262	ONE Friday Fights 31: Kongthoranee vs. Kabutov	September 1, 2023	Lumpinee Boxing Stadium	Bangkok	Thailand		Sornsueknoi FA Group	Alaverdi Ramazanov	$10,000	
261	ONE Friday Fights 30: Saemapetch vs. Kaonar	August 25, 2023	Lumpinee Boxing Stadium	Bangkok	Thailand		Worapon Paidong	Kongklai AnnyMuayThai	$20,000	
261	ONE Friday Fights 30: Saemapetch vs. Kaonar	August 25, 2023	Lumpinee Boxing Stadium	Bangkok	Thailand		Saemapetch Fairtex	Aliff Sor.Dechapan	$10,000	
261	ONE Friday Fights 30: Saemapetch vs. Kaonar	August 25, 2023	Lumpinee Boxing Stadium	Bangkok	Thailand		Songchainoi Kiatsongrit	Chatanan Sor.Jor.Joyprajin	$10,000	
261	ONE Friday Fights 30: Saemapetch vs. Kaonar	August 25, 2023	Lumpinee Boxing Stadium	Bangkok	Thailand		Chalawan Ngorbangkapi	Kaoklai Chor.Hapayak	$10,000	
261	ONE Friday Fights 30: Saemapetch vs. Kaonar	August 25, 2023	Lumpinee Boxing Stadium	Bangkok	Thailand		Eisaku Ogasawara	Ricardo Bravo	$10,000	
261	ONE Friday Fights 30: Saemapetch vs. Kaonar	August 25, 2023	Lumpinee Boxing Stadium	Bangkok	Thailand		Petchgarfield Jitmuangnon	Sho Ogawa	$10,000	
261	ONE Friday Fights 30: Saemapetch vs. Kaonar	August 25, 2023	Lumpinee Boxing Stadium	Bangkok	Thailand		Gadzhimurad Amirzhanov	—N/a	$10,000	
260	ONE Friday Fights 29: Saeksan vs. Araya	August 18, 2023	Lumpinee Boxing Stadium	Bangkok	Thailand		Saeksan Or. Kwanmuang	Rambong Sor.Therapat	$10,000	
259	ONE Friday Fights 28: Kongsuk vs. Jaosuayai	August 11, 2023	Lumpinee Boxing Stadium	Bangkok	Thailand		Suriyanlek Por.Yenying	Antar Kacem	$10,000	
259	ONE Friday Fights 28: Kongsuk vs. Jaosuayai	August 11, 2023	Lumpinee Boxing Stadium	Bangkok	Thailand		Chanajon PK.Saenchai	Suablack Tor.Pran49	$10,000	
258	ONE Fight Night 13: Allazov vs. Grigorian	August 5, 2023	Lumpinee Boxing Stadium	Bangkok	Thailand		Mikey Musumeci	Tawanchai P.K.Saenchai	$50,000	
258	ONE Fight Night 13: Allazov vs. Grigorian	August 5, 2023	Lumpinee Boxing Stadium	Bangkok	Thailand		Oumar Kane	Tye Ruotolo	$50,000	
258	ONE Fight Night 13: Allazov vs. Grigorian	August 5, 2023	Lumpinee Boxing Stadium	Bangkok	Thailand		Enkh-Orgil Baatarkhuu	—N/a	$50,000	
257	ONE Friday Fights 27: Tapaokaew vs. Harrison	August 4, 2023	Lumpinee Boxing Stadium	Bangkok	Thailand		Tyson Harrison	Chai SorSor.Toipadriew	$10,000	
257	ONE Friday Fights 27: Tapaokaew vs. Harrison	August 4, 2023	Lumpinee Boxing Stadium	Bangkok	Thailand		Prajanban Sor.Jor.Wichitpadriew	Khunsuk Sor.Dechapan	$10,000	
257	ONE Friday Fights 27: Tapaokaew vs. Harrison	August 4, 2023	Lumpinee Boxing Stadium	Bangkok	Thailand		Zhang Jinhu	Abdallah Ondash	$10,000	
256	ONE Friday Fights 26: Kulabdam vs. Bohic	July 21, 2023	Lumpinee Boxing Stadium	Bangkok	Thailand		Kirill Khomutov	Puengluang Baanramba	$10,000	
256	ONE Friday Fights 26: Kulabdam vs. Bohic	July 21, 2023	Lumpinee Boxing Stadium	Bangkok	Thailand		Petchdam Petchkiatpetch	Mohammad Siasarani	$10,000	
255	ONE Fight Night 12: Superlek vs. Khalilov	July 15, 2023	Lumpinee Boxing Stadium	Bangkok	Thailand		Garry Tonon	Amir Aliakbari	$50,000	
255	ONE Fight Night 12: Superlek vs. Khalilov	July 15, 2023	Lumpinee Boxing Stadium	Bangkok	Thailand		Akbar Abdullaev	Phetjeeja Lukjaoporongtom	$50,000	
255	ONE Fight Night 12: Superlek vs. Khalilov	July 15, 2023	Lumpinee Boxing Stadium	Bangkok	Thailand		Bogdan Shumarov	—N/a	$50,000	
254	ONE Friday Fights 25: Nakrob vs. Phetphuthai	July 14, 2023	Lumpinee Boxing Stadium	Bangkok	Thailand		Nakrob Fairtex	Watcharapon Singha Mawynn	$10,000	
254	ONE Friday Fights 25: Nakrob vs. Phetphuthai	July 14, 2023	Lumpinee Boxing Stadium	Bangkok	Thailand		Suriyanlek Por.Yenying	Kaoklai Chor.Hapayak	$10,000	
254	ONE Friday Fights 25: Nakrob vs. Phetphuthai	July 14, 2023	Lumpinee Boxing Stadium	Bangkok	Thailand		Kabilan Jalivan	—N/a	$10,000	
253	ONE Friday Fights 24: Reis vs. Pongsiri 2	July 7, 2023	Lumpinee Boxing Stadium	Bangkok	Thailand		Aliff Sor.Dechapan	Sinsamut Klinmee	$10,000	
253	ONE Friday Fights 24: Reis vs. Pongsiri 2	July 7, 2023	Lumpinee Boxing Stadium	Bangkok	Thailand		Amir Abdulmuslimov	Nongam Fairtex	$10,000	
252	ONE Friday Fights 23: Paedsanlek vs. Kongklai	June 30, 2023	Lumpinee Boxing Stadium	Bangkok	Thailand		Kongklai AnnyMuayThai	Stephen Irvine	$10,000	
252	ONE Friday Fights 23: Paedsanlek vs. Kongklai	June 30, 2023	Lumpinee Boxing Stadium	Bangkok	Thailand		Songchainoi Kiatsongrit	Chayan Oorzhak	$10,000	
251	ONE Friday Fights 22: Prajanchai vs. Sam-A 2	June 23, 2023	Lumpinee Boxing Stadium	Bangkok	Thailand		Prajanchai P.K.Saenchai	Superlek Kiatmuu9	$50,000	
251	ONE Friday Fights 22: Prajanchai vs. Sam-A 2	June 23, 2023	Lumpinee Boxing Stadium	Bangkok	Thailand		Anatoly Malykhin	—N/a	$50,000	
251	ONE Friday Fights 22: Prajanchai vs. Sam-A 2	June 23, 2023	Lumpinee Boxing Stadium	Bangkok	Thailand		Saeksan Or. Kwanmuang	—N/a	$20,000	
251	ONE Friday Fights 22: Prajanchai vs. Sam-A 2	June 23, 2023	Lumpinee Boxing Stadium	Bangkok	Thailand		Nico Carrillo	Kongthoranee Sor.Sommai	$10,000	
251	ONE Friday Fights 22: Prajanchai vs. Sam-A 2	June 23, 2023	Lumpinee Boxing Stadium	Bangkok	Thailand		Akram Hamidi	Thongpoon P.K.Saenchai	$10,000	
251	ONE Friday Fights 22: Prajanchai vs. Sam-A 2	June 23, 2023	Lumpinee Boxing Stadium	Bangkok	Thailand		Yangdam Sor.Tor.Hiewbangsaen	—N/a	$10,000	
250	ONE Friday Fights 21: Paidang vs. Kongsuk	June 16, 2023	Lumpinee Boxing Stadium	Bangkok	Thailand		Mongkolkaew Sor.Sommai	Jack Apichat MuayThai	$10,000	
250	ONE Friday Fights 21: Paidang vs. Kongsuk	June 16, 2023	Lumpinee Boxing Stadium	Bangkok	Thailand		Seksan Fairtex	Dabdam Por.Tor.Tor.Thongtawee	$10,000	
250	ONE Friday Fights 21: Paidang vs. Kongsuk	June 16, 2023	Lumpinee Boxing Stadium	Bangkok	Thailand		Xavier Gonzalez	—N/a	$10,000	
249	ONE Fight Night 11: Eersel vs. Menshikov	June 10, 2023	Lumpinee Boxing Stadium	Bangkok	Thailand		Regian Eersel	Ilya Freymanov	$50,000	
249	ONE Fight Night 11: Eersel vs. Menshikov	June 10, 2023	Lumpinee Boxing Stadium	Bangkok	Thailand		Superbon Singha Mawynn	Kwon Won Il	$50,000	
248	ONE Friday Fights 20: Phetsukumvit vs. Jaosuayai	June 9, 2023	Lumpinee Boxing Stadium	Bangkok	Thailand		Jaosuayai Sor.Dechapan	Suablack Tor.Pran49	$10,000	
248	ONE Friday Fights 20: Phetsukumvit vs. Jaosuayai	June 9, 2023	Lumpinee Boxing Stadium	Bangkok	Thailand		Rambong Sor.Terapat	Jaising Sitnayokpunsak	$10,000	
248	ONE Friday Fights 20: Phetsukumvit vs. Jaosuayai	June 9, 2023	Lumpinee Boxing Stadium	Bangkok	Thailand		Torepchi Dongak	—N/a	$10,000	
247	ONE Friday Fights 19: Kulabdam vs. Musaev	June 2, 2023	Lumpinee Boxing Stadium	Bangkok	Thailand		Rittidet Sor.Sommai	KohTao Petsomnuk	$10,000	
247	ONE Friday Fights 19: Kulabdam vs. Musaev	June 2, 2023	Lumpinee Boxing Stadium	Bangkok	Thailand		Ferzan Çiçek	—N/a	$10,000	
246	ONE Friday Fights 18: Harrison vs. Pongsiri	May 26, 2023	Lumpinee Boxing Stadium	Bangkok	Thailand		Teeyai P.K.Saenchai	—N/a	$20,000	
246	ONE Friday Fights 18: Harrison vs. Pongsiri	May 26, 2023	Lumpinee Boxing Stadium	Bangkok	Thailand		Pongsiri P.K.Saenchai	Tyson Harrison	$10,000	
246	ONE Friday Fights 18: Harrison vs. Pongsiri	May 26, 2023	Lumpinee Boxing Stadium	Bangkok	Thailand		Rit Kaewsamrit	ChatAnan Sor.Jor.JoyPrajin	$10,000	
246	ONE Friday Fights 18: Harrison vs. Pongsiri	May 26, 2023	Lumpinee Boxing Stadium	Bangkok	Thailand		Petnumkhum Phundakrataburi	Johan Ghazali	$10,000	
245	ONE Friday Fights 17: Pompetch vs. Duangsompong	May 19, 2023	Lumpinee Boxing Stadium	Bangkok	Thailand		Pompetch P.K.Saenchai	Avatar P.K.Saenchai	$10,000	
245	ONE Friday Fights 17: Pompetch vs. Duangsompong	May 19, 2023	Lumpinee Boxing Stadium	Bangkok	Thailand		Rak Erawan	Rachan Sor.Somnuk	$10,000	
245	ONE Friday Fights 17: Pompetch vs. Duangsompong	May 19, 2023	Lumpinee Boxing Stadium	Bangkok	Thailand		Maisangkum Sor.Yingcharoenkarnchang	Yodlekpet Or. Atchariya	$10,000	
245	ONE Friday Fights 17: Pompetch vs. Duangsompong	May 19, 2023	Lumpinee Boxing Stadium	Bangkok	Thailand		Jelte Blommaert	Ivan Parshikov	$10,000	
245	ONE Friday Fights 17: Pompetch vs. Duangsompong	May 19, 2023	Lumpinee Boxing Stadium	Bangkok	Thailand		Enkh-Orgil Baatarkhuu	—N/a	$10,000	
244	ONE Friday Fights 16: ET vs. Kongthoranee	May 12, 2023	Lumpinee Boxing Stadium	Bangkok	Thailand		Phetjeeja Lukjaoporongtom	Samurai Seeopal	$10,000	
244	ONE Friday Fights 16: ET vs. Kongthoranee	May 12, 2023	Lumpinee Boxing Stadium	Bangkok	Thailand		Sulaiman LooksuanAutoMuaythai	Yodphupa Wimanair	$10,000	
244	ONE Friday Fights 16: ET vs. Kongthoranee	May 12, 2023	Lumpinee Boxing Stadium	Bangkok	Thailand		Huo Xiaolong	Numpangna EagleMuayThai	$10,000	
243	ONE Fight Night 10: Johnson vs. Moraes 3	May 5, 2023	1stBank Center	Broomfield, Colorado	United States		Rodtang Jitmuangnon	—N/a	$100,000	
243	ONE Fight Night 10: Johnson vs. Moraes 3	May 5, 2023	1stBank Center	Broomfield, Colorado	United States		Mikey Musumeci	Stamp Fairtex	$50,000	
243	ONE Fight Night 10: Johnson vs. Moraes 3	May 5, 2023	1stBank Center	Broomfield, Colorado	United States		Zebaztian Kadestam	Sage Northcutt	$50,000	
242	ONE Friday Fights 15: Nakrob vs. Ploywitthaya	May 5, 2023	Lumpinee Boxing Stadium	Bangkok	Thailand		Chokdee Maxjandee	Jaising Sitnayokpunsak	$10,000	
242	ONE Friday Fights 15: Nakrob vs. Ploywitthaya	May 5, 2023	Lumpinee Boxing Stadium	Bangkok	Thailand		Fabio Reis	—N/a	$10,000	
241	ONE Friday Fights 14: Gingsanglek vs. Chorfah	April 28, 2023	Lumpinee Boxing Stadium	Bangkok	Thailand		Gingsanglek Tor.Laksong	Kongchai Chanaidonmuang	$10,000	
241	ONE Friday Fights 14: Gingsanglek vs. Chorfah	April 28, 2023	Lumpinee Boxing Stadium	Bangkok	Thailand		Xavier Gonzalez	Chatpichit SorSor.Toipadriew	$10,000	
241	ONE Friday Fights 14: Gingsanglek vs. Chorfah	April 28, 2023	Lumpinee Boxing Stadium	Bangkok	Thailand		Sakaengam Jitmuangnon	Saeksan Or. Kwanmuang	$10,000	
240	ONE Fight Night 9: Nong-O vs. Haggerty	April 21, 2023	Lumpinee Boxing Stadium	Bangkok	Thailand		Jonathan Haggerty	Felipe Lobo	$50,000	
240	ONE Fight Night 9: Nong-O vs. Haggerty	April 21, 2023	Lumpinee Boxing Stadium	Bangkok	Thailand		Isi Fitikefu	Jhanlo Mark Sangiao	$50,000	
239	ONE Friday Fights 13: Batman vs. Paidang	April 21, 2023	Lumpinee Boxing Stadium	Bangkok	Thailand		Thongpoon P.K.Saenchai	Natalia Diachkova	$10,000	
239	ONE Friday Fights 13: Batman vs. Paidang	April 21, 2023	Lumpinee Boxing Stadium	Bangkok	Thailand		Aliff Sor.Dechapan	Nico Carrillo	$10,000	
238	ONE Friday Fights 12: Petsukumvit vs. Kongthoranee	April 7, 2023	Lumpinee Boxing Stadium	Bangkok	Thailand		Dentungtong Singha Mawynn	Tubtimthong Sor.Jor.Lekmuangnon	$10,000	
238	ONE Friday Fights 12: Petsukumvit vs. Kongthoranee	April 7, 2023	Lumpinee Boxing Stadium	Bangkok	Thailand		Zeta Chor.Chokamnuay	Samingdam Looksuan	$10,000	
237	ONE Friday Fights 11: Superball vs. Kongklai 2	March 31, 2023	Lumpinee Boxing Stadium	Bangkok	Thailand		ET Tded99	Pongsiri Sor.Jor.Wichitpadriew	$10,000	
237	ONE Friday Fights 11: Superball vs. Kongklai 2	March 31, 2023	Lumpinee Boxing Stadium	Bangkok	Thailand		Tyson Harrison	Rambo Mor.Rattanabandit	$10,000	
236	ONE Fight Night 8: Superlek vs. Williams	March 25, 2023	Singapore Indoor Stadium	Kallang	Singapore		Superlek Kiatmuu9	Akbar Abdullaev	$50,000	
236	ONE Fight Night 8: Superlek vs. Williams	March 25, 2023	Singapore Indoor Stadium	Kallang	Singapore		Zhang Peimian	—N/a	$50,000	
235	ONE Friday Fights 10: Yodkitsada vs. Theptaksin	March 24, 2023	Lumpinee Boxing Stadium	Bangkok	Thailand		Thepthaksin Sor.Sornsing	Rak Erawan	$10,000	
235	ONE Friday Fights 10: Yodkitsada vs. Theptaksin	March 24, 2023	Lumpinee Boxing Stadium	Bangkok	Thailand		Thongpoon P.K.Saenchai	Yod-IQ Or.Pimolsri	$10,000	
234	ONE Friday Fights 9: Eersel vs. Sinsamut 2	March 17, 2023	Lumpinee Boxing Stadium	Bangkok	Thailand		Regian Eersel	—N/a	$50,000	
234	ONE Friday Fights 9: Eersel vs. Sinsamut 2	March 17, 2023	Lumpinee Boxing Stadium	Bangkok	Thailand		Muangthai P.K.Saenchai	Sam-A Gaiyanghadao	$10,000	
234	ONE Friday Fights 9: Eersel vs. Sinsamut 2	March 17, 2023	Lumpinee Boxing Stadium	Bangkok	Thailand		Sulaiman LooksuanAutMuaythai	Saeksan Or. Kwanmuang	$10,000	
234	ONE Friday Fights 9: Eersel vs. Sinsamut 2	March 17, 2023	Lumpinee Boxing Stadium	Bangkok	Thailand		Silviu Vitez	Yodlekpet Or. Pitisak	$10,000	
234	ONE Friday Fights 9: Eersel vs. Sinsamut 2	March 17, 2023	Lumpinee Boxing Stadium	Bangkok	Thailand		Tagir Khalilov	—N/a	$10,000	
233	ONE Friday Fights 8: Petsukumvit vs. Petchmuangsri	March 10, 2023	Lumpinee Boxing Stadium	Bangkok	Thailand		Phetsukumvit Boybangna	Petlampun Muadablampang	$10,000	
233	ONE Friday Fights 8: Petsukumvit vs. Petchmuangsri	March 10, 2023	Lumpinee Boxing Stadium	Bangkok	Thailand		Numsurin Chor.Ketwina	Banluerit Or.Atchariya	$10,000	
233	ONE Friday Fights 8: Petsukumvit vs. Petchmuangsri	March 10, 2023	Lumpinee Boxing Stadium	Bangkok	Thailand		Maisangkum Sor. Yingcharoenkarnchang	Jomhod AutoMuayThai	$10,000	
232	ONE Friday Fights 7: Rambolek vs. Theeradet	March 3, 2023	Lumpinee Boxing Stadium	Bangkok	Thailand		Rambolek Chor.Ajalaboon	Samingdam Chor.Ajalaboon	$10,000	
232	ONE Friday Fights 7: Rambolek vs. Theeradet	March 3, 2023	Lumpinee Boxing Stadium	Bangkok	Thailand		Lisa Brierley	—N/a	$10,000	
231	ONE Fight Night 7: Lineker vs. Andrade 2	February 25, 2023	Lumpinee Boxing Stadium	Bangkok	Thailand		Tawanchai P.K.Saenchai	Tommy Langaker	$50,000	
230	ONE Friday Fights 6: Gingsanglek vs. Kongthoranee	February 24, 2023	Lumpinee Boxing Stadium	Bangkok	Thailand		Kongthoranee Sor.Sommai	Johan Ghazali	$10,000	
230	ONE Friday Fights 6: Gingsanglek vs. Kongthoranee	February 24, 2023	Lumpinee Boxing Stadium	Bangkok	Thailand		Bogdan Shumarov	Celest Hansen	$10,000	
229	ONE Friday Fights 5: Kongklai vs. Superball	February 17, 2023	Lumpinee Boxing Stadium	Bangkok	Thailand		Superball Tded99	Kongklai AnnyMuayThai	$10,000	
229	ONE Friday Fights 5: Kongklai vs. Superball	February 17, 2023	Lumpinee Boxing Stadium	Bangkok	Thailand		Namphongnoi Sor.Sommai	Teeyai P.K.Saenchai	$10,000	
229	ONE Friday Fights 5: Kongklai vs. Superball	February 17, 2023	Lumpinee Boxing Stadium	Bangkok	Thailand		Khunsuk Sor.Dechapan	Furkan Karabağ	$10,000	
228	ONE Friday Fights 4: Duangsompong vs. Batman	February 10, 2023	Lumpinee Boxing Stadium	Bangkok	Thailand		Erdem Taha Dincer	Francisca Vera	$10,000	
228	ONE Friday Fights 4: Duangsompong vs. Batman	February 10, 2023	Lumpinee Boxing Stadium	Bangkok	Thailand		Chaongoh Jitmuangnon	Fabio Reis	$10,000	
227	ONE Friday Fights 3: Chorfah vs. Petsukumvit	February 3, 2023	Lumpinee Boxing Stadium	Bangkok	Thailand		Elbrus Amirkhanovich	Kongchai Chanaidonmuang	$10,000	
227	ONE Friday Fights 3: Chorfah vs. Petsukumvit	February 3, 2023	Lumpinee Boxing Stadium	Bangkok	Thailand		Ilyas Musaev	Yu Yau Pui	$10,000	
227	ONE Friday Fights 3: Chorfah vs. Petsukumvit	February 3, 2023	Lumpinee Boxing Stadium	Bangkok	Thailand		Shannon Wiratchai	Alisson Barbosa	$10,000	
226	ONE Friday Fights 2: Sangmanee vs. Kulabdam 2	January 27, 2023	Lumpinee Boxing Stadium	Bangkok	Thailand		Yodlekpet Or. Pitisak	—N/a	$10,000	
225	ONE Friday Fights 1: Nong-O vs. Ramazanov	January 20, 2023	Lumpinee Boxing Stadium	Bangkok	Thailand		Nong-O Gaiyanghadao	Saeksan Or. Kwanmuang	$50,000	
225	ONE Friday Fights 1: Nong-O vs. Ramazanov	January 20, 2023	Lumpinee Boxing Stadium	Bangkok	Thailand		Sakaengam Jitmuangnon	Muangthai P.K.Saenchai	$10,000	
224	ONE Fight Night 6: Superbon vs. Allazov	January 14, 2023	Impact Arena	Bangkok	Thailand		Chingiz Allazov	Aung La Nsang	$50,000	
224	ONE Fight Night 6: Superbon vs. Allazov	January 14, 2023	Impact Arena	Bangkok	Thailand		Stamp Fairtex	Anna Jaroonsak	$50,000	

== Title fights ==
Mixed Martial Arts
#	Weight Class				Method	Round	Time	Event	Notes
1	Bantamweight	Fabrício Andrade	def.	John Lineker	TKO (corner stoppage)	4	5:00	ONE Fight Night 7	For the vacant ONE Bantamweight World Championship.
2	Flyweight	Demetrious Johnson (c)	def.	Adriano Moraes	Decision (unanimous)	5	5:00	ONE Fight Night 10	For the ONE Flyweight World Championship.
3	Heavyweight	Anatoly Malykhin (ic)	def.	Arjan Bhullar (c)	TKO (punches)	3	2:42	ONE Friday Fights 22	For the ONE Heavyweight World Championship.
4	Women's Atomweight	Stamp Fairtex	def.	Ham Seo-hee	TKO (punches to the body)	3	1:04	ONE Fight Night 14	For the vacant ONE Women's Atomweight World Championship.
5	Featherweight	Thanh Le	def.	Ilya Freymanov	Submission (heel hook)	1	1:02	ONE Fight Night 15	For the interim ONE Featherweight World Championship.

Kickboxing
#	Weight Class				Method	Round	T.Time	Event	Notes
1	Flyweight Kickboxing	Superlek Kiatmuu9	def.	Daniel Puertas	Decision (unanimous)	5	3:00	ONE Fight Night 6	For the vacant ONE Flyweight Kickboxing World Championship.
2	Featherweight Kickboxing	Chingiz Allazov	def.	Superbon Singha Mawynn (c)	KO (punches)	2	1:03	ONE Fight Night 6	For the ONE Featherweight Kickboxing World Championship.
3	Flyweight Kickboxing	Superlek Kiatmuu9 (c)	def.	Danial Williams	KO (punches)	3	1:55	ONE Fight Night 8	For the ONE Flyweight Kickboxing World Championship.
4	Featherweight Kickboxing	Chingiz Allazov (c)	def.	Marat Grigorian	Decision (unanimous)	5	3:00	ONE Fight Night 13	For the ONE Featherweight Kickboxing World Championship.
5	Strawweight Kickboxing	Jonathan Di Bella (c)	def.	Danial Williams	Decision (unanimous)	5	3:00	ONE Fight Night 15	For the ONE Strawweight Kickboxing World Championship.
6	Bantamweight Kickboxing	Jonathan Haggerty	def.	Fabrício Andrade	KO (punches)	2	1:57	ONE Fight Night 16	For the vacant ONE Bantamweight Kickboxing World Championship.
7	Women's Atomweight Kickboxing	Phetjeeja Lukjaoporongtom	def.	Anissa Meksen	Decision (unanimous)	5	3:00	ONE Friday Fights 46	For the interim ONE Women's Atomweight Kickboxing World Championship.

Muay Thai
#	Weight Class				Method	Round	T.Time	Event	Notes
1	Bantamweight Muay Thai	Nong-O Gaiyanghadao (c)	def.	Alaverdi Ramazanov	KO (punches)	3	2:14	ONE Friday Fights 1	For the ONE Bantamweight Muay Thai World Championship.
2	Featherweight Muay Thai	Tawanchai P.K.Saenchai (c)	def.	Jamal Yusupov	KO (leg kick)	1	0:49	ONE Fight Night 7	For the ONE Featherweight Muay Thai World Championship.
3	Lightweight Muay Thai	Regian Eersel (c)	def.	Sinsamut Klinmee	KO (punch to the body)	4	1:17	ONE Friday Fights 9	For the ONE Lightweight Muay Thai World Championship.
4	Women's Atomweight Muay Thai	Allycia Rodrigues (c)	def.	Janet Todd (ic)	Decision (unanimous)	5	3:00	ONE Fight Night 8	For the ONE Women's Atomweight Muay Thai World Championship.
5	Bantamweight Muay Thai	Jonathan Haggerty	def.	Nong-O Gaiyanghadao (c)	KO (punches)	1	2:40	ONE Fight Night 9	For the ONE Bantamweight Muay Thai World Championship.
6	Flyweight Muay Thai	Rodtang Jitmuangnon (c)	def.	Edgar Tabares	KO (elbow)	2	1:34	ONE Fight Night 10	For the ONE Flyweight Muay Thai World Championship.
7	Lightweight Muay Thai	Regian Eersel (c)	def.	Dmitry Menshikov	KO (punch)	1	0:46	ONE Fight Night 11	For the ONE Lightweight Muay Thai World Championship.
8	Strawweight Muay Thai	Prajanchai P.K.Saenchai	def.	Sam-A Gaiyanghadao	KO (elbow)	2	2:10	ONE Friday Fights 22	For the interim ONE Strawweight Muay Thai World Championship.
9	Women's Strawweight Muay Thai	Smilla Sundell (c)	def.	Allycia Rodrigues	TKO (punches and elbows)	3	2:58	ONE Fight Night 14	For the ONE Women's Strawweight Muay thai World Championship.
10	Heavyweight Muay Thai	Roman Kryklia	def.	Alex Roberts	KO (punch)	2	0:25	ONE Fight Night 17	For the inaugural ONE Heavyweight Muay Thai World Championship.
11	Featherweight Muay Thai	Tawanchai P.K.Saenchai (c)	def.	Superbon Singha Mawynn	Decision (majority)	5	3:00	ONE Friday Fights 46	For the ONE Featherweight Muay Thai World Championship.Originally a unanimous decision win for Tawanchai; the scorecard was updated.
12	Strawweight Muay Thai	Prajanchai P.K.Saenchai (ic)	def.	Joseph Lasiri (c)	KO (elbow)	1	1:28	ONE Friday Fights 46	For the ONE Strawweight Muay Thai World Championship.

Submission Grappling
#	Weight Class				Method	Round	T.Time	Event	Notes
1	Flyweight Submission Grappling	Mikey Musumeci (c)	def.	Gantumur Bayanduuren	Decision (unanimous)	1	10:00	ONE Fight Night 6	For the ONE Flyweight Submission Grappling World Championship.
2	Flyweight Submission Grappling	Mikey Musumeci (c)	def.	Osamah Almarwai	Submission (rear-naked choke)	1	8:03	ONE Fight Night 10	For the ONE Flyweight Submission Grappling World Championship.
3	Lightweight Submission Grappling	Kade Ruotolo (c)	def.	Tommy Langaker	Decision (unanimous)	1	10:00	ONE Fight Night 11	For the ONE Lightweight Submission Grappling World Championship.
4	Flyweight Submission Grappling	Mikey Musumeci (c)	def.	Jarred Brooks	Submission (triangle armbar)	1	7:30	ONE Fight Night 13	For the ONE Flyweight Submission Grappling World Championship.
5	Women's Atomweight Submission Grappling	Danielle Kelly	def.	Jessa Khan	Decision (unanimous)	1	10:00	ONE Fight Night 14	For the inaugural ONE Women's Atomweight Submission Grappling World Championship.
6	Welterweight Submission Grappling	Tye Ruotolo	def.	Magomed Abdulkadirov	Decision (unanimous)	1	10:00	ONE Fight Night 16	For the inaugural ONE Welterweight Submission Grappling World Championship.

== ONE Friday Fights 8 ==
ONE Friday Fights 8: Petsukumvit vs. Petchmuangsri
- Promotion: ONE Championship
- Date: March 10, 2023
- Venue: Lumpinee Boxing Stadium
- City: Bangkok, Thailand

Event chronology
ONE Friday Fights 7: Rambolek vs. Theeradet	ONE Friday Fights 8: Petsukumvit vs. Petchmuangsri	ONE Friday Fights 9: Eersel vs. Sinsamut 2

ONE Friday Fights 8: Petsukumvit vs. Petchmuangsri (also known as ONE Lumpinee 8) was a combat sports event produced by ONE Championship that took place on March 10, 2023, at Lumpinee Boxing Stadium in Bangkok, Thailand.

=== Background ===
A flyweight muay thai bout between Phetsukumvit Boybangna and Petchmuangsri Aodtukdaeng served as the event headliner.

=== Bonus awards ===
The following fighters received $10,000 bonuses.

- Performance of the Night: Petsukumvit Boibangna, Petlampun Muadablampang, Numsurin Chor.Ketwina, Banluerit Or.Atchariya, Maisangkum Sor. Yingcharoenkarnchang and Jomhod AutoMuayThai

=== Results ===
ONE Friday Fights 8 (YouTube / Facebook)
Weight Class				Method	Round	Time	Notes
Flyweight Muay Thai	(Thailand) Phetsukumvit Boybangna	def.	(Thailand) Petchmuangsri Tded99	KO (punches)	2	2:36	
Catchweight (128 lbs) Muay Thai	(Thailand) Petlampun Muadablampang	def.	(Thailand) Rambong Sor.Terapat	KO (punch)	3	1:14	
Catchweight (116 lbs) Muay Thai	(Thailand) NumSurin Chor.Ketweena	def.	(Thailand) Khunsuknoi Boomdeksian	KO (punches)	1	2:38	
Catchweight (113 lbs) Muay Thai	(Thailand) Banluerit Sitwatcharachai	def.	(Thailand) Nuatoranee Jitmuangnon	KO (punches)	1	2:38	
W.Atomweight Muay Thai	(Thailand) Junior Fairtex	def.	(Thailand) Pancake Kiattongyot	Decision (split)	3	3:00	
Catchweight (116 lbs) Muay Thai	(Thailand) Maisangkam Sor Yingcharoenkarnchang	def.	(Cambodia) Jomhot Charoenmuang	KO (left hook)	3	0:42	
Bantamweight Muay Thai	(Uzbekistan) Mavlud Tupiev	def.	(Russia) Alaverdi Ramazanov	Decision (unanimous)	3	3:00	
Lightweight	(Russia) Vladimir Kanunnikov	def.	(France) Jason Ponet	Decision (unanimous)	3	5:00	
Catchweight (128 lb) Kickboxing	(China) Huo Xiaolong	def.	(Iran) Seyed Mahdi Zadeh	Decision (unanimous)	3	3:00	
Catchweight (118 lb) Muay Thai	(Thailand) Jomhod AutoMuayThai	def.	(Sweden) Daniel Gyllenberg	TKO (punches and elbows)	2	1:05	
Welterweight	(Kyrgyzstan) Salamat Orozakulov	def.	(Pakistan) Furqan Cheema	Decision (unanimous)	3	5:00	
Flyweight Muay Thai	(Iran) Mohammad Sadeghi	def.	(Malaysia) Elias Ghazali	Decision (unanimous)	3	3:00	

== ONE Friday Fights 11 ==
ONE Friday Fights 11: Superball vs. Kongklai 2
- Promotion: ONE Championship
- Date: March 31, 2023
- Venue: Lumpinee Boxing Stadium
- City: Bangkok, Thailand

Event chronology
ONE Fight Night 8: Superlek vs. Williams	ONE Friday Fights 11: Superball vs. Kongklai 2	ONE Friday Fights 12: Petsukumvit vs. Kongthoranee

ONE Friday Fights 11: Superball vs. Kongklai 2 (also known as ONE Lumpinee 11) was a combat sports event produced by ONE Championship that took place on March 31, 2023, at Lumpinee Boxing Stadium in Bangkok, Thailand.

=== Background ===
A 130 pounds catchweight muay thai bout between Superball Tded99 and Kongklai AnnyMuayThai served as the event headliner.

=== Bonus awards ===
The following fighters received $10,000 bonuses.

- Performance of the Night: Pongsiri Sor.Jor.Wichitpadriew, ET Tded99, Tyson Harrison and Rambo Mor.Rattanabandit

=== Results ===
ONE Friday Fights 11 (YouTube / Watch ONE)
Weight Class				Method	Round	Time	Notes
Catchweight (138 lbs) Muay Thai	(Thailand) Superball Tded99	def.	(Thailand) Kongklai AnnyMuayThai	Decision (unanimous)	3	3:00	
Catchweight (130 lbs) Muay Thai	(Thailand) ET Tded99	def.	(Thailand) Apiwat Sor.Somnuk	KO (flying knee)	1	0:37	
Bantamweight Muay Thai	(Thailand) Komawut F.A.Group	def.	(Thailand) Avatar P.K.Saenchai	Decision (split)	3	3:00	
Strawweight Muay Thai	(Thailand) Pongsiri Sor.Jor.Wichitpadriew	def.	(Thailand) Pettong Kiatsongrit	KO (left hook)	1	1:57	
Catchweight (120 lbs) Muay Thai	(Thailand) Olaylek Chor.Hapayak	def	(Thailand) Phetsommai Sor.Sommai	Decision (split)	3	3:00	
Catchweight (132 lbs) Muay Thai	(Thailand) Namphongnoi Sor.Sommai	def.	(Thailand) Songfangkhong F.A.Group	Decision (majority)	3	3:00	
Bantamweight Muay Thai	(Australia) Tyson Harrison	def.	(Thailand) Rambo Mor.Rattanabandit	KO (right straight)	3	3:00	
Flyweight Muay Thai	(Thailand) Yodkaikaew Fairtex	def.	(Greece) Angelos Giakoumis	Decision (unanimous)	3	3:00	
W.Atomweight Muay Thai	(Hong Kong) Yu Yau Pui	def.	(Australia) Devina Martin	TKO (left hook)	3	0:24	
Bantamweight	(Japan) Tatsuya Ando	def.	(Iran) Ali Motamed	TKO (punches)	2	1:38	
Lightweight	(Kazakhstan) Ali Kabdulla	def.	(Brazil) Alisson Barbosa	TKO (elbows)	3	2:22	
W.Strawweight	(Kyrgyzstan) Anelya Toktogonova	def.	(Russia) Aleksandra Savicheva	submission (neck crank)	1	2:13	

== ONE Friday Fights 12 ==
ONE Friday Fights 12: Petsukumvit vs. Kongthoranee
- Promotion: ONE Championship
- Date: April 7, 2023
- Venue: Lumpinee Boxing Stadium
- City: Bangkok, Thailand

Event chronology
ONE Friday Fights 11: Superball vs. Kongklai 2	ONE Friday Fights 12: Petsukumvit vs. Kongthoranee	ONE Friday Fights 13: Rambolek vs. Zhang

ONE Friday Fights 12: Petsukumvit vs. Kongthoranee (also known as ONE Lumpinee 12) was a combat sports event produced by ONE Championship that took place on April 7, 2023, at Lumpinee Boxing Stadium in Bangkok, Thailand.

=== Background ===
A flyweight muay thai bout between Phetsukumvit Boybangna and Kongthoranee Sor.Sommai served as the event headliner.

=== Bonus awards ===
The following fighters received $10,000 bonuses.

- Performance of the Night: Dentungtong Singha Mawynn, Tubtimthong Sor.Jor.Lekmuangnon, Zeta Chor.Chokamnuay and Samingdam Looksuan

=== Results ===
ONE Friday Fights 12 (YouTube / Watch ONE)
Weight Class				Method	Round	Time	Notes
Flyweight Muay Thai	(Thailand) Phetsukumvit Boybangna	def.	(Thailand) Kongthoranee Sor.Sommai	Decision (unanimous)	3	3:00	
Catchweight (130 lbs) Muay Thai	(Thailand) Petlampun Muadablampang	def.	(Thailand) Sunvo Tded99	Decision (unanimous)	3	3:00	
Flyweight Muay Thai	(Thailand) Dentungtong Singha Mawynn	def.	(Thailand) Mohawk Ngorbangkapi	KO (punches)	2	1:56	
Atomweight Muay Thai	(Thailand) Khunsuk Sor.Dechapan	def.	(Thailand) Kohtao Petsomnuk	Decision (unanimous)	3	3:00	
Catchweight (112 lbs) Muay Thai	(Thailand) Tubtimthong Sor.Jor.Lekmuangnon	def.	(Thailand) Petchnumchai Sor.Jor.Tongprachin	KO (punches)	1	1:50	
Catchweight (124 lbs) Muay Thai	(Thailand) Zeta Chor.Chokamnuay	def.	(Thailand) Chalawan Ngorbangkapi	KO (punch and head kick)	1	1:55	
Bantamweight Muay Thai	(France) Rafi Bohic	def.	(Thailand) Tapaokaew Singha Mawynn	Decision (split)	3	3:00	
Bantamweight Muay Thai	(Thailand) Yodphupa Wimanair	def.	(Italy) Samuel Toscano	TKO (doctor stoppage)	1	2:20	
Flyweight Muay Thai	(Thailand) Samingdam Looksuan	def.	(Iran) Javad Bigdeli	TKO (flying knee)	3	1:33	
Catchweight (110 lbs) Muay Thai	(Thailand) Nongam Fairtex	def.	(Hong Kong) Chu Nga Sze	KO (punch)	3	0:23	
Featherweight	(Kyrgyzstan) Nurzaman Eshbaev	def.	(Malaysia) Keanu Subba	Decision (unanimous)	3	5:00	
Featherweight	(South Korea) Do Gyeom Lee	def.	(Brazil) Guilherme Antunes	TKO (punches)	2	3:23	

== ONE Friday Fights 13 ==
ONE Friday Fights 13: Batman vs. Paidang
- Promotion: ONE Championship
- Date: April 21, 2023
- Venue: Lumpinee Boxing Stadium
- City: Bangkok, Thailand

Event chronology
ONE Friday Fights 12: Petsukumvit vs. Kongthoranee	ONE Friday Fights 13: Batman vs. Paidang	ONE Fight Night 9: Nong-O vs. Haggerty

ONE Friday Fights 13: Batman vs. Paidang (also known as ONE Lumpinee 13) was a combat sports event produced by ONE Championship that took place on April 21, 2023, at Lumpinee Boxing Stadium in Bangkok, Thailand.

=== Background ===
A flyweight muay thai bout between Batman Or.Atchariya and Paidang Kiatsongrit served as the event headliner.

=== Bonus awards ===
The following fighters received $10,000 bonuses.

- Performance of the Night: Thongpoon P.K.Saenchai, Natalia Diachkova, Aliff Sor Dechapan, Rambolek Chor.Ajalaboon and Nico Carrillo

=== Results ===
ONE Friday Fights 13 (YouTube / Facebook)
Weight Class				Method	Round	Time	Notes
Flyweight Muay Thai	(Thailand) Paidang Kiatsongrit	def.	(Thailand) Batman Or.Atchariya	Decision (unanimous)	3	3:00	
Catchweight (126 lbs) Muay Thai	(Brazil) Noelison Silva	def.	(Thailand) Surachai Sor Sommai	Decision (unanimous)	3	3:00	
Catchweight (118 lbs) Muay Thai	(Thailand) Thongpoon P.K.Saenchai	def.	(Thailand) Petmongkol Soonkelahuaitom	KO (punch)	1	0:20	
Catchweight (132 lbs) Muay Thai	(Thailand) Petsaenkom Yaicheyseafood	def.	(Thailand) Thuanthong Sor Sommai	Decision (unanimous)	3	3:00	
W.Strawweight Muay Thai	(Russia) Natalia Diachkova	def.	(Thailand) Dokmaipa Fairtex	KO (punches)	1	1:41	
Catchweight (119 lbs) Muay Thai	(Malaysia) Aliff Sor.Dechapan	def.	(Thailand) Rittidet Kiatsongrit	TKO (spinning elbow)	2	0:46	
Bantamweight Muay Thai	(Thailand) Rambolek Chor.Ajalaboon	def.	(China) Zhang Chenglong	KO (punches)	2	1:33	
Featherweight Muay Thai	(Scotland) Nico Carrillo	def.	(Turkey) Furkan Karabağ	TKO (punches)	3	2:30	
Bantamweight Muay Thai	(Thailand) Hercules Wor Chakrawut	def.	(Russia) Aslanbek Zikreev	Decision (split)	3	3:00	
Flyweight Muay Thai	(Thailand) Dedduanglek Tded99	def.	(Uzbekistan) Shakhriyor Jurayev	Decision (unanimous)	3	3:00	
Bantamweight	(Mongolia) Enkh-Orgil Baatarkhuu	def.	(Philippines) Adonis Sevillino	Decision (unanimous)	3	5:00	
Featherweight	(Philippines) Carlos Alvarez	def.	(Iran) Reza Abasi	TKO (strikes)	2	3:50	

== ONE Friday Fights 14 ==
ONE Friday Fights 14: Gingsanglek vs. Chorfah
- Promotion: ONE Championship
- Date: April 28, 2023
- Venue: Lumpinee Boxing Stadium
- City: Bangkok, Thailand

Event chronology
ONE Fight Night 9: Nong-O vs. Haggerty	ONE Friday Fights 14: Gingsanglek vs. Chorfah	ONE Friday Fights 15: Nakrob vs. Ploywitthaya

ONE Friday Fights 14: Gingsanglek vs. Chorfah (also known as ONE Lumpinee 14) was a combat sports event produced by ONE Championship that took place on April 28, 2023, at Lumpinee Boxing Stadium in Bangkok, Thailand.

=== Background ===
A 132 pounds catchweight muay thai bout between Gingsanglek Tor.Laksong and Chorfah Tor.Sangtiennoi served as the event headliner.

=== Bonus awards ===
The following fighters received $10,000 bonuses.

- Performance of the Night: Gingsanglek Tor.Laksong, Kongchai Chanaidonmuang, Xavier Gonzalez, Chatpichit SorSor.Toipadriew, Sakaengam Jitmuangnon and Saeksan Or. Kwanmuang

=== Results ===
ONE Friday Fights 14 (YouTube / Facebook)
Weight Class				Method	Round	Time	Notes
Catchweight (132 lbs) Muay Thai	(Thailand) Gingsanglek Tor.Laksong	def.	(Thailand) Chorfah Tor.Sangtiennoi	KO (head kick)	2	0:13	
Atomweight Muay Thai	(Thailand) Khunsueklek Boomdeksian	def.	(Thailand) Koko Sor.Sommai	Decision (unanimous)	3	3:00	
Strawweight Muay Thai	(Thailand) Kongchai Chanaidonmuang	def.	(Spain) Xavier Gonzalez	Decision (majority)	3	3:00	
Catchweight (147 lbs) Muay Thai	(Thailand) Saenphon Sor.Sommai	def.	(Thailand) Yodkompatak Sinbimuaythai	Decision (unanimous)	3	3:00	
Catchweight (118 lbs) Muay Thai	(Thailand) NumSurin Chor.Ketweena	def.	(Thailand) Yodsila Chor.Hapayak	Decision (unanimous)	3	3:00	
Catchweight (113 lbs) Muay Thai	(Thailand) Chatpichit SorSor.Toipadriew	def.	(Thailand) Sakaengam Jitmuangnon	Decision (unanimous)	3	3:00	
Catchweight (142 lbs) Muay Thai	(Thailand) Saeksan Or. Kwanmuang	def.	(Republic of Ireland) Sean Clancy	TKO (doctor stoppage)	2	2:22	
Catchweight (149 lbs) Muay Thai	(Iran) Fariyar Aminipour	def.	(Thailand) Ferrari Fairtex	Decision (unanimous)	3	3:00	
Catchweight (136 lbs) Muay Thai	(Thailand) Chalam Parunchai	def.	(Iran) Mohammad Sadeghi	Decision (majority)	3	3:00	
W.Catchweight (112 lbs) Muay Thai	(England) Lisa Brierley	def.	(Chile) Francisca Vera	Decision (unanimous)	3	3:00	
Strawweight	(Philippines) Dave Bangguigui	def.	(Brazil) Marcus Paulo Amaral	Decision (unanimous)	3	5:00	
Flyweight Muay Thai	(United States) Jalill Barnes	def.	(Thailand) Doraemon	Decision (unanimous)	3	3:00	

== ONE Friday Fights 15 ==
ONE Friday Fights 15: Nakrob vs. Ploywitthaya
- Promotion: ONE Championship
- Date: May 5, 2023
- Venue: Lumpinee Boxing Stadium
- City: Bangkok, Thailand

Event chronology
ONE Friday Fights 14: Gingsanglek vs. Chorfah	ONE Friday Fights 15: Nakrob vs. Ploywitthaya	ONE Fight Night 10: Johnson vs. Moraes 3

ONE Friday Fights 15: Nakrob vs. Ploywitthaya (also known as ONE Lumpinee 15) was a combat sports event produced by ONE Championship that took place on May 5, 2023, at Lumpinee Boxing Stadium in Bangkok, Thailand.

=== Background ===
A flyweight muay thai bout between Nakrob Faitrex and Ploywitthaya Chor.Wimolsin served as the event headliner.

=== Bonus awards ===
The following fighters received $10,000 bonuses.

- Performance of the Night: Chokdee Maxjandee, Jaising Sitnayokpunsak and Fabio Reis

=== Results ===
ONE Friday Fights 15 (YouTube / Facebook)
Weight Class				Method	Round	Time	Notes
Flyweight Muay Thai	(Thailand) Nakrob Faitrex	def.	(Thailand) Ploywitthaya Chor.Wimolsin	Decision (unanimous)	3	3:00	
Catchweight (143 lbs) Muay Thai	(Thailand) Siwakorn P.K.Saenchai	def.	(Thailand) Theeradet Chor.Hapayak	Decision (unanimous)	3	3:00	
Catchweight (137 lbs) Muay Thai	(Thailand) Baramee Sujeebameekiew	def.	(Thailand) Muangsap Kiatsongrit	Decision (majority)	3	3:00	
Catchweight (137 lbs) Muay Thai	(Thailand) Sibsan Nokkhao KorMor11	def.	(Thailand) Worlaphon Kiatchatchanun	Decision (split)	3	3:00	
Catchweight (116 lbs) Muay Thai	(Thailand) Chokdee Maxjandee	def.	(Thailand) Dinneurthong Muadphong191	TKO (punches)	3	2:48	
Flyweight Muay Thai	(Thailand) Jaising Sitnayokpunsak	def.	(Thailand) Denpayak Detpetchsrithong	KO (right cross)	3	1:37	
Bantamweight Muay Thai	(Portugal) Fabio Reis	def.	(Thailand) Sangmanee P.K.Saenchai	KO (left hook)	1	2:36	
Lightweight Muay Thai	(Thailand) Rungrawee Sitsongpeenong	def.	(Russia) Vladimir Gabov	Decision (unanimous)	3	3:00	
Catchweight (157 lbs) Muay Thai	(United Kingdom) Josh Hill (kickboxer)	def.	(Thailand) Satanfah Sitsongpeenong	Decision (unanimous)	3	3:00	
W.Strawweight Muay Thai	(Brazil) Yuly Alves	def.	(Thailand) Kwankhao Por Muangpetch	Decision (unanimous)	3	3:00	
Bantamweight	(New Zealand) Mark Abelardo	def.	(Armenia) Taron Grigorian	TKO (knees)	2	2:56	
Lightweight	(Brazil) Lucas Gabriel	def.	(Uzbekistan) Ibragim Shaymanov	Decision (unanimous)	3	5:00	

== ONE Friday Fights 16 ==
ONE Friday Fights 16: ET vs. Kongthoranee
- Promotion: ONE Championship
- Date: May 12, 2023
- Venue: Lumpinee Boxing Stadium
- City: Bangkok, Thailand

Event chronology
ONE Fight Night 10: Johnson vs. Moraes 3	ONE Friday Fights 16: ET vs. Kongthoranee	ONE Friday Fights 17: Pompetch vs. Duangsompong

ONE Friday Fights 16: ET vs. Kongthoranee (also known as ONE Lumpinee 16) was a combat sports event produced by ONE Championship that took place on May 12, 2023, at Lumpinee Boxing Stadium in Bangkok, Thailand.

=== Background ===
A 132 pounds catchweight muay thai bout between ET Tded99 and Kongthoranee Sor.Sommai served as the event headliner.

=== Bonus awards ===
The following fighters received $10,000 bonuses.

- Performance of the Night: Phetjeeja Lukjaoporongtom, Samurai Seeopal, Sulaiman Looksuanmuaythai, Yodphupa Wimanair, Huo Xiaolong and Numpangna EagleMuayThai

=== Results ===
ONE Friday Fights 16 (YouTube / Facebook)
Weight Class				Method	Round	Time	Notes
Catchweight (132 lbs) Muay Thai	(Thailand) Kongthoranee Sor.Sommai	def.	(Thailand) ET Tded99	Decision (majority)	3	3:00	
Flyweight Muay Thai	(Thailand) Yodduangjai SorJor.Montree	def.	(Thailand) Dentungtong Singha Mawynn	Decision (unanimous)	3	3:00	
W.Atomweight Muay Thai	(Thailand) Phetjeeja Lukjaoporongtom	def.	(France) Inès Pilutti	TKO (punches)	1	2:50	
Catchweight (139 lbs) Muay Thai	(Thailand) Paruehatnoi TBM Gym	def.	(Myanmar) Sonrak Sit Por.Jor.Wor.	Decision (unanimous)	3	3:00	
Catchweight (133 lbs) Muay Thai	(Thailand) Samurai Seeopal	def.	(Thailand) Petkuntung Yaicheyseafood	KO (punch)	1	1:34	
Flyweight Muay Thai	(Myanmar) Sulaiman LooksuanMuayThai	def.	(Thailand) Petake Sor.Thepparat	TKO (punches)	2	0:20	
Catchweight (147 lbs) Muay Thai	(Thailand) Yodphupa Wimanair	def.	(Russia) Andrey Khromov	KO (punches)	2	1:30	
Strawweight Kickboxing	(China) Huo Xiaolong	def.	(Kazakhstan) Ali Serik	KO (body kick)	1	1:04	
Catchweight (140 lbs) Muay Thai	(Thailand) Numpangna EagleMuayThai	def.	(Kyrgyzstan) Ali-Khan Ergeshov	TKO (leg kicks)	3	1:23	
Flyweight Kickboxing	(Russia) Temirlan Bekmurzaev	def.	(Vietnam) Lương Thành Phúc	TKO (body kick)	2	2:25	
Middleweight	(Russia) Magomedmurad Khasaev	def.	(Iran) Arash Mardani	KO (head kick)	1	4:25	
Flyweight	(Armenia) Moris Boleyan	def.	(Brazil) Felipe Silva	Submission (rear-naked choke)	1	4:25	

== ONE Friday Fights 17 ==
ONE Friday Fights 17: Pompetch vs. Duangsompong
- Promotion: ONE Championship
- Date: May 19, 2023
- Venue: Lumpinee Boxing Stadium
- City: Bangkok, Thailand

Event chronology
ONE Friday Fights 16: ET vs. Kongthoranee	ONE Friday Fights 17: Pompetch vs. Duangsompong	ONE Friday Fights 18: Harrison vs. Pongsiri

ONE Friday Fights 17: Pompetch vs. Duangsompong (also known as ONE Lumpinee 17) was a combat sports event produced by ONE Championship that took place on May 19, 2023, at Lumpinee Boxing Stadium in Bangkok, Thailand.

=== Background ===
A 133 pounds catchweight muay thai bout between Pompetch P.K.Saenchai and Duangsompong Jitmuangnon served as the event headliner.

=== Bonus awards ===
The following fighters received $10,000 bonuses.

- Performance of the Night: Pompetch P.K.Saenchai, Avatar P.K.Saenchai, Rak Erawan, Rachan Sor.Somnuk, Maisangkum Sor.Yingcharoenkarnchang, Yodlekpet Or. Atchariya, Jelte Blommaert, Ivan Parshikov and Enkh-Orgil Baatarkhuu

=== Results ===
ONE Friday Fights 17 (YouTube / Facebook)
Weight Class				Method	Round	Time	Notes
Catchweight (133 lbs) Muay Thai	(Thailand) Pompetch P.K.Saenchai	def.	(Thailand) Duangsompong Jitmuangnon	KO (left hook)	1	1:15	
Bantamweight Muay Thai	(Thailand) Avatar P.K.Saenchai	def.	(Thailand) Komawut F.A.Group	Decision (unanimous)	3	3:00	
Catchweight (128 lbs) Muay Thai	(Thailand) Denkriangkrai Singha Mawynn	def.	(Thailand) Apiwat Sor.Somnuk	Decision (split)	3	3:00	
Catchweight (116 lbs) Muay Thai	(Thailand) Rak Erawan	def.	(Thailand) Mahasamut Nayokgungmuangpet	KO (punches)	2	1:35	
Catchweight (112 lbs) Muay Thai	(Thailand) Rachan Sor.Somnuk	def.	(Thailand) Khunsuk Sor.Dechapan	TKO (punches)	3	1:53	
Catchweight (120 lbs) Muay Thai	(Thailand) Maisangkum Sor.Yingcharoenkarnchang	def.	(Brazil) Dionatha Santos Tobias	KO (punches)	1	1:25	
Catchweight (138 lbs) Muay Thai	(Thailand) Yodlekpet Or. Atchariya	def.	(Canada) Denis Purić	TKO (three knockdowns)	3	2:07	
Strawweight Muay Thai	(Belgium) Jelte Blommaert	def.	(China) Li Guozhen	KO (knee)	2	1:49	
W.Atomweight Muay Thai	(Australia) Celest Hansen	def.	(England) Dani Fall	Decision (split)	3	3:00	
Bantamweight	(Russia) Ivan Parshikov	def.	(China) Lianyang Xia	TKO (elbows and punches)	1	4:15	
Bantamweight	(Mongolia) Enkh-Orgil Baatarkhuu	def.	(Philippines) Rockie Bactol	TKO (punches and elbows)	1	4:59	

== ONE Friday Fights 18 ==
ONE Friday Fights 18: Harrison vs. Pongsiri
- Promotion: ONE Championship
- Date: May 26, 2023
- Venue: Lumpinee Boxing Stadium
- City: Bangkok, Thailand

Event chronology
ONE Friday Fights 17: Pompetch vs. Duangsompong	ONE Friday Fights 18: Harrison vs. Pongsiri	ONE Friday Fights 19: Kulabdam vs. Musaev

ONE Friday Fights 18: Harrison vs. Pongsiri (also known as ONE Lumpinee 18) was a combat sports event produced by ONE Championship that took place on May 26, 2023, at Lumpinee Boxing Stadium in Bangkok, Thailand.

=== Background ===
A bantamweight muay thai bout between Tyson Harrison and Pongsiri P.K.Saenchai served as the event headliner.

=== Bonus awards ===
The following fighters received $20,000 bonuses.

- Performance of the Night: Teeyai P.K.Saenchai

The following fighters received $10,000 bonuses.

- Performance of the Night: Pongsiri P.K.Saenchai, Tyson Harrison, Rit Kaewsamrit, ChatAnan Sor.Jor.JoyPrajin, Petnumkhum Phundakrataburi and Johan Ghazali

=== Results ===
ONE Friday Fights 18 (YouTube / Facebook)
Weight Class				Method	Round	Time	Notes
Catchweight (147.6 lbs) Muay Thai	(Thailand) Pongsiri P.K.Saenchai	def.	(Australia) Tyson Harrison	Decision (unanimous)	3	3:00	Originally a bantamweight bout; Pongsiri missed weight (147.6 lbs)
Catchweight (132 lbs) Muay Thai	(Thailand) Samingdam Chor.Ajalaboon	def.	(Thailand) Mahamongkol MoveOnChiangmai	Decision (unanimous)	3	3:00	
Strawweight Muay Thai	(Thailand) Teeyai P.K.Saenchai	def.	(Thailand) Saklek Kiatsongrit	KO (flying knee)	2	0:58	
Bantamweight Muay Thai	(Thailand) Rit Kaewsamrit	def.	(Thailand) Sansiri P.K.Saenchai	KO (left hook)	2	0:33	
Catchweight (129 lbs) Muay Thai	(Thailand) ChatAnan Sor.Jor.JoyPrajin	def.	(Thailand) Suphachailek Nengsubyai	TKO (referee stoppage)	2	2:41	
Catchweight (116.2 lbs) Muay Thai	(Thailand) Petnumkhum Phundakrataburi	def.	(Thailand) Petkritsada CMA Academy	KO (right hook)	1	0:46	Originally a 116 pounds bout; Petkritsada missed weight (116.2 lbs)
Featherweight Kickboxing	(Iran) Mohammad Siasarani	def.	(Morocco) Mohammed Boutasaa	Decision (unanimous)	3	3:00	
Lightweight Muay Thai	(Thailand) Chanajon PK.Saenchai	def.	(Brazil) Victor Hugo	Decision (unanimous)	3	3:00	
W.Catchweight (128 lbs) Kickboxing	(Sweden) Smilla Sundell	def.	(Serbia) Milana Bjelogrlić	Decision (unanimous)	3	3:00	
Flyweight Muay Thai	(Malaysia) Johan Ghazali	def.	(Thailand) Tai Sor.Jor. Piek-U-Thai	KO (punch)	3	1:37	
Flyweight	(Russia) Andrey Chelbaev	def.	(India) Manthan Rane	Decision (unanimous)	3	5:00	
Lightweight	(Kazakhstan) Ali Kabdulla	def.	(Brazil) Richard Godoy	TKO (knee and elbow)	3	1:38	

== ONE Friday Fights 19 ==
ONE Friday Fights 19: Kulabdam vs. Musaev
- Promotion: ONE Championship
- Date: June 2, 2023
- Venue: Lumpinee Boxing Stadium
- City: Bangkok, Thailand

Event chronology
ONE Friday Fights 18: Harrison vs. Pongsiri	ONE Friday Fights 19: Kulabdam vs. Musaev	ONE Friday Fights 20: Phetsukumvit vs. Jaosuayai

ONE Friday Fights 19: Kulabdam vs. Musaev (also known as ONE Lumpinee 19) was a combat sports event produced by ONE Championship that took place on June 2, 2023, at Lumpinee Boxing Stadium in Bangkok, Thailand.

=== Background ===
A bantamweight muay thai bout between Kulabdam Sor.Jor.Piek-U-Thai and Ilyas Musaev served as the event headliner.

=== Bonus awards ===
The following fighters received $10,000 bonuses.

- Performance of the Night: Rittidet Sor.Sommai, KohTao Petsomnuk and Ferzan Çiçek

=== Results ===
ONE Friday Fights 19 (YouTube / Facebook)
Weight Class				Method	Round	Time	Notes
Bantamweight Muay Thai	(Thailand) Kulabdam Sor.Jor.Piek-U-Thai	def.	(Russia) Ilyas Musaev	Decision (unanimous)	3	3:00	
Catchweight (124 lbs) Muay Thai	(Thailand) Ronachai Tor.Ramintra	def.	(Thailand) Aekkalak Sor.Samarngarment	Decision (unanimous)	3	3:00	
Catchweight (133 lbs) Muay Thai	(Thailand) Rittidet Sor.Sommai	def.	(United States) Jalill Barnes	KO (left hook)	3	0:20	
Catchweight (122 lbs) Muay Thai	(Thailand) Petrapha Sor.Sophit	def.	(Thailand) Den Sitnayoktaweeptaphong	Decision (split)	3	3:00	
Catchweight (116 lbs) Muay Thai	(Thailand) KohTao Petsomnuk	def.	(Thailand) Amnartdet Sitnayokmot	TKO (punches)	3	2:54	
Catchweight (126 lbs) Muay Thai	(Iran) Soroush Akbari	def.	(Thailand) Parnpet Sor.Jor.Lekmuangnon	Decision (split)	3	3:00	
Bantamweight Kickboxing	(Russia) Elbrus Osmanov	def.	(Thailand) Kaonar Sor.Jor.Tongprajin	Decision (unanimous)	3	3:00	
Bantamweight Muay Thai	(Turkey) Ferzan Çiçek	def.	(Thailand) Panrit Lookjaomaesaiwaree	KO (left hook)	3	0:26	
Catchweight (129 lbs) Muay Thai	(Thailand) Pongsiri Sor.Jor.Wichitpadriew	def.	(Brazil) Noelison Silva	Decision (unanimous)	3	3:00	
W.Strawweight Muay Thai	(Russia) Natalia Diachkova	def.	(Italy) Lena Nocker	TKO (punches)	1	1:58	
Bantamweight	(China) Chen Rui	def.	(Philippines) Drex Zamboanga	Decision (split)	3	5:00	
Lightweight	(Russia) Murad Umachiev	def.	(Uzbekistan) Ibragim Shaymanov	Decision (unanimous)	3	5:00	

== ONE Friday Fights 20 ==
ONE Friday Fights 20: Phetsukumvit vs. Jaosuayai
- Promotion: ONE Championship
- Date: June 9, 2023
- Venue: Lumpinee Boxing Stadium
- City: Bangkok, Thailand

Event chronology
ONE Friday Fights 19: Kulabdam vs. Musaev	ONE Friday Fights 20: Phetsukumvit vs. Jaosuayai	ONE Fight Night 11: Eersel vs. Menshikov

ONE Friday Fights 20: Phetsukumvit vs. Jaosuayai (also known as ONE Lumpinee 20) was a combat sports event produced by ONE Championship that took place on June 9, 2023, at Lumpinee Boxing Stadium in Bangkok, Thailand.

=== Background ===
A flyweight muay thai bout between Phetsukumvit Boybangna and Jaosuayai Sor.Dechapan served as the event headliner.

=== Bonus awards ===
The following fighters received $10,000 bonuses.

- Performance of the Night: Jaosuayai Sor.Dechaphan, Suablack Tor.Pran49, Rambong Sor.Terapat, Jaising Sitnayokpunsak and Torepchi Dongak

=== Results ===
ONE Friday Fights 20 (YouTube / Facebook)
Weight Class				Method	Round	Time	Notes
Flyweight Muay Thai	(Thailand) Jaosuayai Sor.Dechapan	def.	(Thailand) Phetsukumvit Boybangna	KO (right hook)	1	2:30	
Catchweight (132 lbs) Muay Thai	(Thailand) Theptaksin Sor.Sornsing	def.	(Thailand) Yodkrisada Sor.Sommai	Decision (split)	3	3:00	
Catchweight (142 lbs) Muay Thai	(Thailand) Suablack Tor.Pran49	def.	(Thailand) Thanungern F.A.Group	KO (punch)	2	2:14	
Catchweight (136 lbs) Muay Thai	(Thailand) Puengluang Baanramba	def.	(Thailand) Jomhod Chor.Ketweena	KO (punch)	3	2:30	
Catchweight (128 lbs) Muay Thai	(Thailand) Rambong Sor.Terapat	def.	(Thailand) Petchsuwan Boomdeksian	KO (left hook)	1	0:15	
W.Catchweight (110 lbs) Muay Thai	(Thailand) Gusjung Fairtex	vs.	(Thailand) Nongnook Mor.Kor.Chor.Chaiyaphum	No Contest (accidental eye poke)	1		Gusjung unable to continue.
Bantamweight Muay Thai	(Thailand) Yod-IQ Or.Pimolsri	def.	(Uzbekistan) Mavlud Tupiev	Decision (unanimous)	3	3:00	
Catchweight (162 lbs) Muay Thai	(Brazil) Victor Texeira	def.	(Thailand) Kongthailand Kiatnavy	KO (right hook)	2	2:46	Teixeira missed weight (162 lbs).
Flyweight Muay Thai	(Thailand) Jaising Sitnayokpunsak	def.	(China) Zhang Jinhu	KO (left head kick)	1	0:34	
Catchweight (147 lbs) Muay Thai	(Thailand) Saenphon Sor.Sommai	def.	(Turkey) Gökhan Boran	Decision (unanimous)	3	3:00	
Featherweight	(Moldova) Constantin Mărărescu	vs.	(Poland) Bartosz Skrok	No Contest (illegal knee)	2	3:06	
Flyweight	(Russia) Torepchi Dongak	def.	(Russia) Ivan Orekhov	TKO (corner stoppage)	2	3:16	

== ONE Friday Fights 21 ==
ONE Friday Fights 21: Paidang vs. Kongsuk
- Promotion: ONE Championship
- Date: June 16, 2023
- Venue: Lumpinee Boxing Stadium
- City: Bangkok, Thailand

Event chronology
ONE Fight Night 11: Eersel vs. Menshikov	ONE Friday Fights 21: Paidang vs. Kongsuk	ONE Friday Fights 22: Prajanchai vs. Sam-A 2

ONE Friday Fights 21: Paidang vs. Kongsuk (also known as ONE Lumpinee 21) was a combat sports event produced by ONE Championship that took place on June 16, 2023, at Lumpinee Boxing Stadium in Bangkok, Thailand.

=== Background ===
A flyweight muay thai bout between Paidang Kiatsongrit and Kongsuk Fairtex served as the event headliner.

=== Bonus awards ===
The following fighters received $10,000 bonuses.

- Performance of the Night: Mongkolkaew Sor.Sommai, Jack Apichat MuayThai, Seksan Fairtex, Dabdam Por.Tor.Tor.Thongtawee and Xavier Gonzalez

=== Results ===
ONE Friday Fights 21 (YouTube / Facebook)
Weight Class				Method	Round	Time	Notes
Flyweight Muay Thai	(Thailand) Kongsuk Fairtex	def.	(Thailand) Paidang Kiatsongrit	Decision (unanimous)	3	3:00	
Flyweight Muay Thai	(Thailand) Mongkolkaew Sor.Sommai	def.	(Myanmar) Sonrak Sit Por.Jor.Wor.	KO (knees)	3	1:40	
Catchweight (136 lbs) Muay Thai	(Thailand) Pettonglor Sitluangpeenumfon	def.	(Thailand) Rungsangtawan Sor.Parrat	Decision (unanimous)	3	3:00	
Catchweight (142 lbs) Muay Thai	(Thailand) Jack Apichat MuayThai	def.	(Thailand) Mardanglek Nakatawan	KO (right straight)	1	1:22	
Flyweight Muay Thai	(Thailand) Seksan Fairtex	def.	(Thailand) Dokmaipa P.K.Saenchai	KO (punches)	1	2:50	
Catchweight (124 lbs) Muay Thai	(Thailand) Panthep V.K.Khaoyai	def.	(Thailand) Yodkumarn Maxjandee	Decision (unanimous)	3	3:00	
Bantamweight Muay Thai	(Thailand) Yodphupa Wimanair	def.	(Belarus) Antar Kacem	Decision (split)	3	3:00	
Flyweight Muay Thai	(Malaysia) Elias Ghazali	def.	(Iran) Javad Bigdeli	Decision (unanimous)	3	3:00	
Catchweight (126 lbs) Muay Thai	(Thailand) Dabdam Por.Tor.Tor.Thongtawee	def.	(Spain) Xavier Gonzalez	Decision (split)	3	3:00	
Catchweight (140 lbs) Muay Thai	(Thailand) Thongsiam Kiatsongrit	def.	(Japan) Sho Ogawa	Decision (unanimous)	3	3:00	
Featherweight	(Kyrgyzstan) Adilet Nurmatov	def.	(Brazil) Leonardo Casotti	TKO (elbows and punches)	3	0:35	
Flyweight	(Kyrgyzstan) Yryskeldi Duisheev	def.	(Uzbekistan) Magomed Magomedov	TKO (punches)	3	3:19	

== ONE Friday Fights 23 ==
ONE Friday Fights 23: Paedsanlek vs. Kongklai
- Promotion: ONE Championship
- Date: June 30, 2023
- Venue: Lumpinee Boxing Stadium
- City: Bangkok, Thailand

Event chronology
ONE Friday Fights 22: Prajanchai vs. Sam-A 2	ONE Friday Fights 23: Paedsanlek vs. Kongklai	ONE Friday Fights 24: Reis vs. Pongsiri 2

ONE Friday Fights 23: Paedsanlek vs. Kongklai (also known as ONE Lumpinee 23) was a combat sports event produced by ONE Championship that took place on June 30, 2023, at Lumpinee Boxing Stadium in Bangkok, Thailand.

=== Background ===
A 140 pounds catchweight muay thai bout between Paedsanlek P.K.Saenchai and Kongklai AnnyMuayThai served as the event headliner.

=== Bonus awards ===
The following fighters received $10,000 bonuses.

- Performance of the Night: Kongklai AnnyMuayThai, Stephen Irvine, Songchainoi Kiatsongrit and Chayan Oorzhak

=== Results ===
ONE Friday Fights 23 (YouTube / Facebook)
Weight Class				Method	Round	Time	Notes
Catchweight (140 lbs) Muay Thai	(Thailand) Kongklai AnnyMuayThai	def.	(Thailand) Paedsanlek P.K.Saenchai	TKO (Three knockdowns)	3	3:00	
Catchweight (160 lbs) Muay Thai	(Thailand) Beckham BigWinChampion Gym	def.	(Bulgaria) Anton Petrov	Decision (Unanimous)	3	3:00	
Strawweight Muay Thai	(Scotland) Stephen Irvine	def.	(Thailand) Pettong Kiatsongrit	TKO (Three knockdowns)	2	2:36	
Catchweight (128 lbs) Muay Thai	(Thailand) Petlampun Muadablampang	def.	(Thailand) Patakake SinbiMuayThai	Decision (Unanimous)	3	3:00	
Catchweight (116 lbs) Muay Thai	(Thailand) NumSurin Chor.Ketweena	def.	(Thailand) Chokdee Maxjandee	Decision (Unanimous)	3	3:00	
Catchweight (119 lbs) Muay Thai	(Thailand) Songchainoi Kiatsongrit	def.	(Thailand) Mungkorn Boomdeksian	KO (Flying knee)	3	1:52	Originally 116 lbs, Mungkorn missed weight.
Lead Card
Strawweight Kickboxing	(Thailand) Kompetch Sitsarawatsuer	def.	(China) Huo Xiaolong	Decision (Unanimous)	3	3:00	
Catchweight (140 lbs) Muay Thai	(Romania) Silviu Vitez	def.	(Australia) River Daz	Decision (Unanimous)	3	3:00	
Featherweight Muay Thai	(Russia) Alexandr Skvortsov	def.	(Spain) Jose Manuel Hita	Decision (Majority)	3	3:00	
W.Atomweight Muay Thai	(Hong Kong) Yu Yau Pui	def.	(Estonia) Marie Ruumet	Decision (Unanimous)	3	3:00	
Heavyweight	(United States) Lawrence Philips	def.	(Iran) Dalir Moradian	TKO (Punches & elbows)	1	3:47	
Bantamweight	(Mongolia) Chayan Oorzhak	def.	(Uzbekistan) Avliyohon Hamidov	TKO (Retirement)	1	3:18	

== ONE Friday Fights 24 ==
ONE Friday Fights 24: Reis vs. Pongsiri 2
- Promotion: ONE Championship
- Date: July 7, 2023
- Venue: Lumpinee Boxing Stadium
- City: Bangkok, Thailand

Event chronology
ONE Friday Fights 23: Paedsanlek vs. Kongklai	ONE Friday Fights 24: Reis vs. Pongsiri 2	ONE Friday Fights 25: Nakrob vs. Phetputhai

ONE Friday Fights 24: Reis vs. Pongsiri 2 (also known as ONE Lumpinee 24) was a combat sports event produced by ONE Championship that took place on July 7, 2023, at Lumpinee Boxing Stadium in Bangkok, Thailand.

=== Background ===
A bantamweight muay thai bout between Fabio Reis and Pongsiri P.K.Saenchai served as the event headliner.

=== Bonus awards ===
The following fighters received $10,000 bonuses.

- Performance of the Night: Aliff Sor.Dechapan, Sinsamut Klinmee, Amir Abdulmuslimov and Nongam Fairtex

=== Results ===
ONE Friday Fights 24 (YouTube / Facebook)
Weight Class				Method	Round	Time	Notes
Bantamweight Muay Thai	(Thailand) Pongsiri P.K.Saenchai	def.	(Portugal) Fabio Reis	Decision (majority)	3	3:00	
Catchweight (137 lbs) Muay Thai	(Thailand) Sibsan Nokkhao KorMor11	def.	(Thailand) Muangsap Kiatsongrit	Decision (split)	3	3:00	
Catchweight (127 lbs) Muay Thai	(Thailand) Singdomthong Nokjeanladkrabang	def.	(Thailand) Rambong Sor.Terapat	Decision (unanimous)	3	3:00	
Catchweight (134 lbs) Muay Thai	(Thailand) Songfangkhong F.A.Group	def.	(Thailand) Denpayak Detpetchsrithong	Decision (unanimous)	3	3:00	
Catchweight (117 lbs) Muay Thai	(Thailand) Mahahin Nakbinalaiyon	def.	(Thailand) Rachan Sor.Somnuk	Decision (split)	3	3:00	
Catchweight (119 lbs) Muay Thai	(Malaysia) Aliff Sor.Dechapan	def.	(Thailand) Ratchadej Sor.Petjumrat	KO (left hook)	1	0:50	
Lightweight Muay Thai	(Thailand) Sinsamut Klinmee	def.	(Brazil) Victor Texeira	TKO (doctor stoppage)	2	1:35	
Flyweight Muay Thai	(Thailand) Black Panther	def.	(Iran) Mohammad Sadeghi	Decision (split)	3	3:00	
Flyweight Muay Thai	(Russia) Amir Abdulmuslimov	def.	(Thailand) Jaising Sitnayokpunsak	KO (left hook to the body & right hook)	3	2:28	
W.Catchweight (110 lbs) Muay Thai	(Thailand) Nongam Fairtex	def.	(England) Lisa Brierley	KO (right straight)	1	1:28	
Featherweight	(Russia) Georgy Shahruramazanov	def.	(Brazil) Isaque Moura	Decision (unanimous)	3	5:00	
Featherweight	(Uzbekistan) Asliddin Eshankulov	def.	(Russia) Nadyr Aliev	Submission (rear-naked choke)	2	0:50	

== ONE Friday Fights 25 ==
ONE Friday Fights 25: Nakrob vs. Phetphuthai
- Promotion: ONE Championship
- Date: July 14, 2023
- Venue: Lumpinee Boxing Stadium
- City: Bangkok, Thailand

Event chronology
ONE Friday Fights 24: Reis vs. Pongsiri 2	ONE Friday Fights 25: Nakrob vs. Phetphuthai	ONE Fight Night 12: Superlek vs. Khalilov

ONE Friday Fights 25: Nakrob vs. Phetphuthai (also known as ONE Lumpinee 25) was a combat sports event produced by ONE Championship that took place on July 14, 2023, at Lumpinee Boxing Stadium in Bangkok, Thailand.

=== Background ===
A flyweight muay thai bout between Nakrob Fairtex and Phetphuthai OrBorJor.Nakhonphanom served as the event headliner.

=== Bonus awards ===
The following fighters received $10,000 bonuses.

- Performance of the Night: Nakrob Fairtex, Watcharapon Singha Mawynn, Suriyanlek Por.Yenying, Kaoklai Chor.Hapayak and Kabilan Jelevan

=== Results ===
ONE Friday Fights 25 (YouTube / Facebook)
Weight Class				Method	Round	Time	Notes
Flyweight Muay Thai	(Thailand) Nakrob Fairtex	def.	(Thailand) Phetphuthai OrBorJor.Nakhonphanom	KO (elbow)	2	1:28	
Bantamweight Muay Thai	(Thailand) Avatar P.K.Saenchai	def.	(Turkey) Ferzan Çiçek	Decision (split)	3	3:00	
Catchweight (128 lbs) Muay Thai	(Thailand) Watcharapon Singha Mawynn	def.	(Thailand) Songchana Tor.Brucelee	KO (right hook)	1	2:31	
Catchweight (132 lbs) Muay Thai	(Thailand) Suriyanlek Por.Yenying	def.	(Thailand) Yodduangjai SorJor.Montree	KO (punches)	1	0:50	
Strawweight Muay Thai	(Thailand) Kaoklai Chor.Hapayak	def.	(Thailand) Yodanucha ChotBangsaen	TKO (right hook to the body & punches)	1	2:40	
Catchweight (113 lbs) Muay Thai	(Thailand) Sakolpat ChotBangsaen	def.	(Thailand) Chatpichit SorSor.Toipadriew	Decision (unanimous)	3	3:00	
Catchweight (142 lbs) Muay Thai	(Thailand) Yodlekpet Or. Atchariya	def.	(Australia) Jordan Godtfredsen	Decision (split)	3	3:00	
Flyweight Muay Thai	(Malaysia) Johan Ghazali	def.	(Thailand) Samurai Seeopal	Decision (unanimous)	3	3:00	
Catchweight (128 lbs) Muay Thai	(Uzbekistan) Aslamjon Ortikov	def.	(Thailand) Kaotaem Fairtex	Decision (unanimous)	3	3:00	
Flyweight Muay Thai	(Malaysia) Kabilan Jelevan	def.	(Myanmar) Sulaiman LooksuanMuayThai	TKO (right hook)	1	2:51	
Lightweight	(Ukraine) Daniel Donchenko	def.	(Brazil) Gabriel Souza	KO (punches)	1	1:24	
Featherweight	(Philippines) Carlos Alvarez	def.	(Iran) Sadegh Ghasemi	Submission (d'arce choke)	2	1:23	

== ONE Friday Fights 26 ==
ONE Friday Fights 26: Kulabdam vs. Bohic
- Promotion: ONE Championship
- Date: July 21, 2023
- Venue: Lumpinee Boxing Stadium
- City: Bangkok, Thailand

Event chronology
ONE Fight Night 12: Superlek vs. Khalilov	ONE Friday Fights 26: Kulabdam vs. Bohic	ONE Friday Fights 27

ONE Friday Fights 26: Kulabdam vs. Bohic (also known as ONE Lumpinee 26) was a combat sports event produced by ONE Championship that took place on July 21, 2023, at Lumpinee Boxing Stadium in Bangkok, Thailand.

=== Background ===
A bantamweight muay thai bout between former two-division Lumpinee Stadium world champion Kulabdam Sor.Jor.Piek-U-Thai and former Lumpinee Stadium Welterweight (-147 lbs) world champion Rafi Bohic served as the event headliner.

=== Bonus awards ===
The following fighters received $10,000 bonuses.

- Performance of the Night: Kirill Khomutov, Puengluang Baanramba, Petchdam Petchkiatpetch and Mohammad Siasarani

=== Results ===
ONE Friday Fights 26 (YouTube / Facebook)
Weight Class				Method	Round	Time	Notes
Bantamweight Muay Thai	(Thailand) Kulabdam Sor.Jor.Piek-U-Thai	vs.	(France) Rafi Bohic	No Contest (accidental eye poke)	1		Accidental eye poke rendered Kulabdam unable to continue.
Bantamweight Muay Thai	(Russia) Kirill Khomutov	def.	(Thailand) Suakim Sor.Jor.Tongprajin	KO (left hook)	2	0:58	
Catchweight (128 lbs) Muay Thai	(Thailand) Apiwat Sor.Somnuk	def.	(Thailand) Denkriangkrai Singha Mawynn	Decision (unanimous)	3	3:00	
Catchweight (137 lbs) Muay Thai	(Thailand) Puengluang Baanramba	def.	(Thailand) Khunponnoi Sor.Sommai	KO (punches)	1	1:59	
Catchweight (134 lbs) Muay Thai	(Thailand) Petchdam Petchkiatpetch	def.	(Thailand) Sakchainoi M U Den	KO (right hook)	2	2:04	
W.Atomweight Muay Thai	(Thailand) Junior Fairtex	def.	(China) Wang Yue	Decision (unanimous)	3	3:00	
Flyweight Muay Thai	(Thailand) Dedduanglek Tded99	def.	(Japan) Taiki Naito	Decision (unanimous)	3	3:00	
Featherweight Muay Thai	(Iran) Mohammad Siasarani	def.	(Thailand) Satanfah Sitsongpeenong	KO (punches)	1	2:26	
Bantamweight Muay Thai	(Uzbekistan) Mavlud Tupiev	def.	(Thailand) Rambo Mor.Rattanabandit	Decision (unanimous)	3	3:00	
Catchweight (126 lbs) Muay Thai	(Thailand) Kongchai Chanaidonmuang	def.	(Belgium) Jelte Blommaert	Decision (unanimous)	3	3:00	
Women's Strawweight	(Australia) Lisa Kyriacou	def.	(Thailand) Nat "Wondergirl" Jaroonsak	Decision (unanimous)	3	5:00	
Lightweight	(United States) Brett Pastore	def.	(Turkey) Emran Hafızoğlu	Decision (unanimous)	3	5:00	

== ONE Friday Fights 27 ==
ONE Friday Fights 27: Tapaokaew vs. Harrison
- Promotion: ONE Championship
- Date: August 4, 2023
- Venue: Lumpinee Boxing Stadium
- City: Bangkok, Thailand

Event chronology
ONE Friday Fights 26: Kulabdam vs. Bohic	ONE Friday Fights 27: Tapaokaew vs. Harrison	ONE Fight Night 13: Allazov vs. Grigorian

ONE Friday Fights 27: Tapaokaew vs. Harrison (also known as ONE Lumpinee 27) was a combat sports event produced by ONE Championship that took place on August 4, 2023, at Lumpinee Boxing Stadium in Bangkok, Thailand.

=== Background ===
A bantamweight muay thai bout between Tapaokaew Singha Mawynn and Tyson Harrison served as the event headliner.

=== Bonus awards ===
The following fighters received $10,000 bonuses.

- Performance of the Night: Tyson Harrison, Chai SorSor.Toipadriew, Prajanban Sor.Jor.Wichitpadriew, Khunsuk Sor.Dechapan, Zhang Jinhu and Abdallah Ondash

=== Results ===
ONE Friday Fights 27 (YouTube / Facebook)
Weight Class				Method	Round	Time	Notes
Bantamweight Muay Thai	(Australia) Tyson Harrison	def.	(Thailand) Tapaokaew Singha Mawynn	KO (right uppercut & left hook)	1	2:20	
Catchweight (132 lbs) Muay Thai	(Thailand) Pompetch P.K.Saenchai	def.	(Thailand) Theptaksin Sor.Sornsing	Decision (unanimous)	3	3:00	
Catchweight (130 lbs) Muay Thai	(Thailand) Chai SorSor.Toipadriew	def.	(Thailand) Magnum Sor.Sommai	KO (punches)	2	1:25	
Flyweight Muay Thai	(Thailand) Prajanban Sor.Jor.Wichitpadriew	def.	(Thailand) Tuan Kor.Kampanat	KO (right elbow)	2	1:00	
Catchweight (112 lbs) Muay Thai	(Thailand) Khunsuk Sor.Dechapan	def.	(Thailand) Rachan Sor.Somnuk	KO (right straight)	3	0:42	
Catchweight (117 lbs) Muay Thai	(Thailand) Ratchamongkol Maethongbairecycle	def.	(Thailand) Petnumkhum Phundakrataburi	Decision (unanimous)	3	3:00	
Bantamweight Muay Thai	(Thailand) Ferrari Fairtex	def.	(Russia) Ilyas Musaev	Decision (unanimous)	3	3:00	
Strawweight Muay Thai	(Scotland) Stephen Irvine	def.	(Thailand) Panthep V.K.Khaoyai	TKO (three knockdowns)	2	1:27	
Flyweight Muay Thai	(China) Zhang Jinhu	def.	(Thailand) Haroon Bangmad Klongton	TKO (three knockdowns)	1	1:05	
Strawweight Muay Thai	(Lebanon) Abdallah Ondash	def.	(Thailand) Parnpet Sor.Jor.Lekmuangnon	KO (punches)	3	2:59	
Heavyweight	(Russia) Roman Lukashevich	def.	(United States) Lawrence Philips	Submission (kneebar)	3	4:07	
Bantamweight	(Philippines) Carlo Bumina-ang	def.	(Iran) Reza Saedi	TKO (punches & knees)	1	0:52	

== ONE Friday Fights 28 ==
ONE Friday Fights 28: Kongsuk vs. Jaosuayai
- Promotion: ONE Championship
- Date: August 11, 2023
- Venue: Lumpinee Boxing Stadium
- City: Bangkok, Thailand

Event chronology
ONE Fight Night 13: Allazov vs. Grigorian	ONE Friday Fights 28: Kongsuk vs. Jaosuayai	ONE Friday Fights 29: Saeksan vs. Araya

ONE Friday Fights 28: Kongsuk vs. Jaosuayai (also known as ONE Lumpinee 28) was a combat sports event produced by ONE Championship that took place on August 11, 2023, at Lumpinee Boxing Stadium in Bangkok, Thailand.

=== Background ===
A flyweight muay thai bout between two-division Lumpinee Stadium world champion Kongsuk Fairtex and Jaosuayai Sor.Dechapan served as the event headliner.

=== Bonus awards ===
The following fighters received $10,000 bonuses.

- Performance of the Night: Suriyanlek Por.Yenying, Antar Kacem, Chanajon PK.Saenchai and Suablack Tor.Pran49

=== Results ===
ONE Friday Fights 28 (YouTube / Facebook)
Weight Class				Method	Round	Time	Notes
Flyweight Muay Thai	(Thailand) Kongsuk Fairtex	def.	(Thailand) Jaosuayai Sor.Dechapan	Decision (unanimous)	3	3:00	
Catchweight (134 lbs) Muay Thai	(Thailand) Suriyanlek Por.Yenying	def.	(Thailand) Songfangkhong FA Group	KO (left hook)	2	1:46	
Catchweight (140 lbs) Muay Thai	(Thailand) Pentor SP Kansard Paeminburi	def.	(Thailand) Jack Apichat MuayThai	Decision (unanimous)	3	3:00	
Catchweight (118 lbs) Muay Thai	(Thailand) Mahahin Nakbinalaiyon	def.	(Thailand) Petchsangwan Sor.Samarngarment	Decision (unanimous)	3	3:00	
Catchweight (118 lbs) Muay Thai	(Thailand) Petchsaensuk ChotBangsaen	def.	(Thailand) Kohtao Petsomnuk	Decision (unanimous)	3	3:00	
Catchweight (119 lbs) Muay Thai	(Thailand) Robocop Radgoldgym	def.	(Thailand) Yoddoi Kaewsamrit	Decision (unanimous)	3	3:00	
Bantamweight Muay Thai	(Belarus) Antar Kacem	def.	(Thailand) Yodphupa Wimanair	KO (right hook)	2	2:36	
Lightweight Muay Thai	(Thailand) Chanajon PK.Saenchai	def.	(France) Mohamed Hanoun	KO (right cross)	2	0:28	
Catchweight (126 lbs) Muay Thai	(Spain) Xavier Gonzalez	def.	(Thailand) Dabdam Por.Tor.Tor.Thongtawee	Decision (unanimous)	3	3:00	
Bantamweight Muay Thai	(Thailand) Suablack Tor.Pran49	def.	(Italy) Lenny Blasi	TKO (referee stoppage)	3	1:26	
Strawweight	(Uzbekistan) Sanzhar Zakirov	def.	(Philippines) Dave Bangguigui	TKO (punches)	3	4:11	
Women's Atomweight	(South Korea) Kim So-yul	def.	(France) Noelle Grandjean	Submission (triangle choke)	2	3:57	

== ONE Friday Fights 29 ==
ONE Friday Fights 29: Saeksan vs. Araya
- Promotion: ONE Championship
- Date: August 18, 2023
- Venue: Lumpinee Boxing Stadium
- City: Bangkok, Thailand

Event chronology
ONE Friday Fights 28: Kongsuk vs. Jaosuayai	ONE Friday Fights 29: Saeksan vs. Araya	ONE Friday Fights 30: Saemapetch vs. Kaonar

ONE Friday Fights 29: Saeksan vs. Araya (also known as ONE Lumpinee 29) was a combat sports event produced by ONE Championship that took place on August 18, 2023, at Lumpinee Boxing Stadium in Bangkok, Thailand.

=== Background ===
A 140 pounds catchweight muay thai bout between Saeksan Or. Kwanmuang and Isaac Araya served as the event headliner.

=== Bonus awards ===
The following fighters received $10,000 bonuses.

- Performance of the Night: Saeksan Or. Kwanmuang and Rambong Sor.Therapat

=== Results ===
ONE Friday Fights 29 (YouTube / Facebook)
Weight Class				Method	Round	Time	Notes
Catchweight (140 lbs) Muay Thai	(Thailand) Saeksan Or. Kwanmuang	def.	(Spain) Isaac Araya	TKO (right cross)	2	0:46	
Flyweight Muay Thai	(Thailand) Duangsompong Jitmuangnon	def.	(Thailand) Paidang Kiatsongrit	Decision (unanimous)	3	3:00	
Catchweight (143 lbs) Muay Thai	(Thailand) Komawut FA Group	def.	(Thailand) Panrit Lookjaomaesaiwaree	Decision (majority)	3	3:00	
Catchweight (128 lbs) Muay Thai	(Thailand) Pethuahin Jitmuangnon	def.	(Thailand) Pongsiri Sor.Jor.Wichitpadriew	Decision (unanimous)	3	3:00	
Catchweight (126 lbs) Muay Thai	(Thailand) Singdomthong Nokjeanladkrabang	def.	(Thailand) Surachai Sor.Sommai	Decision (unanimous)	3	3:00	
Catchweight (122 lbs) Muay Thai	(Thailand) Face Erawan	def.	(Thailand) Petrapha Sor.Sopit	Decision (majority)	3	3:00	
Bantamweight Muay Thai	(Iran) Fariyar Aminipour	def.	(Thailand) Pongsiri P.K.Saenchai	Decision (unanimous)	3	3:00	
Bantamweight Kickboxing	(Russia) Elbrus Osmanov	def.	(Netherlands) Wail Karroumi	Decision (unanimous)	3	3:00	
Catchweight (128 lbs) Muay Thai	(Thailand) Rambong Sor.Therapat	def.	(Brazil) Noelison Silva	TKO (corner stoppage)	2	3:00	
Women's Atomweight Muay Thai	(Hong Kong) Yu Yau Pui	def.	(Australia) Celest Hansen	Decision (unanimous)	3	3:00	
Welterweight	(Malaysia) Agilan Thani	def.	(Russia) Magomedmurad Khasaev	Submission (rear-naked choke)	2	3:14	
Flyweight	(Mongolia) Chayan Oorzhak	def.	(Russia) Andrey Chelbaev	TKO (retirement)	2	5:00	

== ONE Friday Fights 30 ==
ONE Friday Fights 30: Saemapetch vs. Kaonar
- Promotion: ONE Championship
- Date: August 25, 2023
- Venue: Lumpinee Boxing Stadium
- City: Bangkok, Thailand

Event chronology
ONE Friday Fights 29: Saeksan vs. Araya	ONE Friday Fights 30: Saemapetch vs. Kaonar	ONE Friday Fights 31: Kongthoranee vs. Kabutov

ONE Friday Fights 30: Saemapetch vs. Kaonar (also known as ONE Lumpinee 30) was a combat sports event produced by ONE Championship that took place on August 25, 2023, at Lumpinee Boxing Stadium in Bangkok, Thailand.

=== Background ===
A bantamweight muay thai bout between former title challenger Saemapetch Fairtex and Lumpinee Stadium world champion Kaonar Sor.Jor.Tongprajin served as the event headliner.

=== Bonus awards ===
The following fighters received $20,000 bonuses.

- Performance of the Night: Worapon Paidong and Kongklai AnnyMuayThai

The following fighters received $10,000 bonuses.

- Performance of the Night: Saemapetch Fairtex, Aliff Sor.Dechapan, Songchainoi Kiatsongrit, Chatanan Sor.Jor.Joyprajin, Chalawan Ngorbangkapi, Kaoklai Chor.Hapayak, Eisaku Ogasawara, Ricardo Bravo, Petchgarfield Jitmuangnon, Sho Ogawa and Gadzhimurad Amirzhanov

=== Results ===
ONE Friday Fights 30 (YouTube / Facebook)
Weight Class				Method	Round	Time	Notes
Bantamweight Muay Thai	(Thailand) Saemapetch Fairtex	def.	(Thailand) Kaonar Sor.Jor.Tongprajin	KO (punches)	1	2:09	
Catchweight (122 lbs) Muay Thai	(Malaysia) Aliff Sor.Dechapan	def.	(Thailand) Yangdam Sor.Tor.Hiewbangsaen	Decision (unanimous)	3	3:00	Originally 119 lbs, Yangdam missed weight.
Catchweight (140 lbs) Muay Thai	(Thailand) Worapon Paidong	def.	(Thailand) Salatan Jitmuangnon	KO (head kick)	2	1:47	
Catchweight (116 lbs) Muay Thai	(Thailand) Songchainoi Kiatsongrit	def.	(Thailand) Chokdee Maxjandee	KO (punches to the body)	2	1:45	
Catchweight (129 lbs) Muay Thai	(Thailand) Chatanan Sor.Jor.Joyprajin	def.	(Thailand) Haodong Jitmuangnon	KO (left hook)	2	2:39	
Strawweight Muay Thai	(Thailand) Chalawan Ngorbangkapi	def.	(Thailand) Kaoklai Chor.Hapayak	KO (punches)	2	1:24	
Catchweight (139 lbs) Muay Thai	(Thailand) Kongklai AnnyMuayThai	def.	(Romania) Silviu Vitez	TKO (knees)	2	2:42	
Catchweight (132 lbs) Muay Thai	(Japan) Eisaku Ogasawara	def.	(Thailand) Yodwittaya Petchompoo	KO (right hook)	1	0:31	
Catchweight (165 lbs) Muay Thai	(Argentina) Ricardo Bravo	def.	(Thailand) Denpanom Pran26	KO (left hook)	2	1:48	
Catchweight (138 lbs) Muay Thai	(Thailand) Petchgarfield Jitmuangnon	def.	(Japan) Sho Ogawa	Decision (unanimous)	3	3:00	
Welterweight	(Russia) Gadzhimurad Amirzhanov	def.	(Iran) Mehraban Farhadi	Submission (anaconda choke)	1	1:27	
Catchweight (163 lbs)	(Uzbekistan) Mukhammadumar Abdurakhmonov	def.	(South Korea) Lim Gwan-woo	Decision (unanimous)	3	5:00	

== ONE Friday Fights 31 ==
ONE Friday Fights 31: Kongthoranee vs. Kabutov
- Promotion: ONE Championship
- Date: September 1, 2023
- Venue: Lumpinee Boxing Stadium
- City: Bangkok, Thailand

Event chronology
ONE Friday Fights 30: Saemapetch vs. Kaonar	ONE Friday Fights 31: Kongthoranee vs. Kabutov	ONE Friday Fights 32: Kompetch vs. Kongchai

ONE Friday Fights 31: Kongthoranee vs. Kabutov (also known as ONE Lumpinee 31) was a combat sports event produced by ONE Championship that took place on September 1, 2023, at Lumpinee Boxing Stadium in Bangkok, Thailand.

=== Background ===
A flyweight muay thai bout between two-division Rajadamnern Stadium world champion Kongthoranee Sor.Sommai and Sherzod Kabutov served as the event headliner.

=== Bonus awards ===
The following fighters received $10,000 bonuses.

- Performance of the Night: Chorfah Tor.Sangtiennoi, Sibsan Nokkhao KorMor11, Sornsueknoi FA Group and Alaverdi Ramazanov

=== Results ===
ONE Friday Fights 31 (YouTube / Facebook)
Weight Class				Method	Round	Time	Notes
Flyweight Muay Thai	(Thailand) Kongthoranee Sor.Sommai	def.	(Kyrgyzstan) Sherzod Kabutov	Decision (unanimous)	3	3:00	
Catchweight (132 lbs) Muay Thai	(Thailand) Chorfah Tor.Sangtiennoi	def.	(Thailand) Mongkolkaew Sor.Sommai	KO (left hook)	2	0:31	
Catchweight (138 lbs) Muay Thai	(Thailand) Sibsan Nokkhao KorMor11	def.	(Thailand) Baramee Sujeebameekiew	KO (elbow)	2	0:30	
Flyweight Muay Thai	(Thailand) Puengluang Baanramba	def.	(Thailand) Seksan Fairtex	Decision (unanimous)	3	3:00	
Catchweight (128 lbs) Muay Thai	(Thailand) Sornsueknoi FA Group	def.	(Thailand) Udomlek Nupranburi	TKO (leg kick)	1	2:09	
Catchweight (117 lbs) Muay Thai	(Thailand) Tonglampoon Maimornforest	def.	(Thailand) Apidet Namduemmee77	Decision (unanimous)	3	3:00	
Bantamweight Muay Thai	(Russia) Alaverdi Ramazanov	def.	(Italy) Alessandro Sara	KO (elbow)	1	1:39	
Strawweight Kickboxing	(Italy) Luca Cecchetti	def.	(China) Huo Xiaolong	Decision (unanimous)	3	3:00	
Bantamweight Muay Thai	(Australia) River Daz	def.	(Thailand) Nontakit Tor.Morsi	Decision (unanimous)	3	3:00	
Women's Catchweight (112 lbs) Muay Thai	(Thailand) Nongam Fairtex	def.	(Chile) Francisca Vera	Decision (majority)	3	3:00	
Catchweight (139 lbs)	(Kyrgyzstan) Ilimbek Akylbek Uulu	def.	(Russia) Gadzhimurad Gasanguseinov	Decision (unanimous)	3	5:00	

== ONE Friday Fights 32 ==
ONE Friday Fights 32: Kompetch vs. Kongchai
- Promotion: ONE Championship
- Date: September 8, 2023
- Venue: Lumpinee Boxing Stadium
- City: Bangkok, Thailand

Event chronology
ONE Friday Fights 31: Kongthoranee vs. Kabutov	ONE Friday Fights 32: Kompetch vs. Kongchai	ONE Friday Fights 33

ONE Friday Fights 32: Kompetch vs. Kongchai (also known as ONE Lumpinee 32) was a combat sports event produced by ONE Championship that took place on September 8, 2023, at Lumpinee Boxing Stadium in Bangkok, Thailand.

=== Background ===
A strawweight muay thai bout between former two-division Lumpinee Stadium world champion Kompetch Fairtex and former Rajadamnern Stadium world champion Kongchai Chanaidonmuang served as the event headliner.

=== Bonus awards ===
The following fighters received $10,000 bonuses.

- Performance of the Night: Nabil Anane, Suablack Tor.Pran49 and Rhuam Felipe Morais Caldas

=== Results ===
ONE Friday Fights 32 (YouTube / Facebook)
Weight Class				Method	Round	Time	Notes
Strawweight Muay Thai	(Thailand) Kompetch Fairtex	def.	(Thailand) Kongchai Chanaidonmuang	Decision (unanimous)	3	3:00	
Featherweight Muay Thai	(Iran) Mohammad Siasarani	def.	(Thailand) Sitthichai Sitsongpeenong	Decision (unanimous)	3	3:00	
Flyweight Muay Thai	(Algeria) Nabil Anane	def.	(Thailand) Nakrob Fairtex	KO (right straight)	2	1:08	
Catchweight (132 lbs) Muay Thai	(Thailand) Dentungtong Singha Mawynn	def.	(Thailand) Denpayak Detpetchsrithong	Decision (unanimous)	3	3:00	
Catchweight (124 lbs) Muay Thai	(Thailand) Petchpailin Sor.Jor.Tongprajin	def.	(Thailand) Kritpetch P.K.Saenchai	Decision (unanimous)	3	3:00	
Bantamweight Muay Thai	(Thailand) Suablack Tor.Pran49	def.	(Japan) Shinji Suzuki	KO (left uppercut)	2	1:35	
Catchweight (126 lbs) Muay Thai	(Japan) Takuma Ota	def.	(Belgium) Jelte Blommaert	Decision (unanimous)	3	3:00	
Flyweight Muay Thai	(Brazil) Rhuam Felipe Morais Caldas	def.	(Malaysia) Kabilan Jalivan	TKO (punches)	2	1:41	
Women's Strawweight Muay Thai	(Russia) Natalia Diachkova	def.	(England) Hannah Brady	Decision (unanimous)	3	3:00	
Lightweight	(Russia) Ivan Podrugin	def.	(United States) Brett Pastore	Submission (guillotine choke)	2	1:53	
Bantamweight	(Turkey) Işfak Seyid	def.	(Moldova) Konstantin Marareskul	Decision (unanimous)	3	5:00	

== ONE Friday Fights 33 ==
ONE Friday Fights 33: Yod-IQ vs. Balyko
- Promotion: ONE Championship
- Date: September 15, 2023
- Venue: Lumpinee Boxing Stadium
- City: Bangkok, Thailand

Event chronology
ONE Friday Fights 32: Kompetch vs. Kongchai	ONE Friday Fights 33: Yod-IQ vs. Balyko	ONE Friday Fights 34: Rodtang vs. Superlek

ONE Friday Fights 33: Yod-IQ vs. Balyko (also known as ONE Lumpinee 33) was a combat sports event produced by ONE Championship that took place on September 15, 2023, at Lumpinee Boxing Stadium in Bangkok, Thailand.

=== Background ===
A 150 pounds catchweight muay thai bout between Yod-IQ P.K.Saenchai and Alexey Balyko served as the event headliner.

=== Bonus awards ===
The following fighters received $10,000 bonuses.

- Performance of the Night: Tubtimthong Sor.Jor.Lekmuangnon, Yodnumchai Fairtex, Otop Or.Kwanmuang and Yamin P.K.Saenchai

=== Results ===
ONE Friday Fights 33 (YouTube / Facebook)
Weight Class				Method	Round	Time	Notes
Catchweight (150 lbs) Muay Thai	(Russia) Alexey Balyko	def.	(Thailand) Yod-IQ Or.Pimolsri	Decision (unanimous)	3	3:00	
Catchweight (129 lbs) Muay Thai	(Thailand) Watcharapon Singha Mawynn	def.	(Thailand) Apiwat Sor.Somnuk	Decision (unanimous)	3	3:00	
Catchweight (124 lbs) Muay Thai	(Thailand) Panthep V.K.Khaoyai	def.	(Thailand) Chalamkhao P.K.Saenchai	Decision (unanimous)	3	3:00	
Catchweight (112 lbs) Muay Thai	(Thailand) Tubtimthong Sor.Jor.Lekmuangnon	def.	(Thailand) Sakolpat ChotBangsaen	KO (right uppercut & left hook)	1	1:38	
Catchweight (126 lbs) Muay Thai	(Lebanon) Abdallah Ondash	def.	(Thailand) Palangboon Wor.Sangtai	Decision (split)	3	3:00	
Catchweight (127 lbs) Muay Thai	(Thailand) Sing Sor.Chokmeechai	def.	(Thailand) Win Sitjaenim	Decision (unanimous)	3	3:00	
Catchweight (116 lbs) Muay Thai	(Thailand) Yodnumchai Fairtex	def.	(Thailand) Chalamkhao Jitmuangnon	TKO (left straight)	2	0:48	
Catchweight (143 lbs) Muay Thai	(Thailand) Otop Or.Kwanmuang	def.	(Japan) Shingo Shibata	TKO (three knockdowns / punches)	1	0:59	
Flyweight Muay Thai	(Thailand) Yamin P.K.Saenchai	def.	(China) Zhang Jinhu	KO (left elbow)	3	0:23	
Catchweight (129 lbs) Muay Thai	(Thailand) Teeyai P.K.Saenchai	def.	(Egypt) Ayad Albadr	Decision (unanimous)	3	3:00	
Women's Atomweight Muay Thai	(Thailand) Junior Fairtex	def.	(Turkey) Zehra Doğan	TKO (right straight to the body)	2	2:36	
Flyweight	(Pakistan) Ismail Khan	def.	(South Korea) Cho Joon-gun	Submission (rear-naked choke)	3	1:10	
Flyweight	(Nepal) Rabindra Dhant	def.	(Russia) Torepchi Dongak	TKO (punches)	3	1:55	

== ONE Friday Fights 34 ==
ONE Friday Fights 34: Rodtang vs. Superlek
- Promotion: ONE Championship
- Date: September 22, 2023
- Venue: Lumpinee Boxing Stadium
- City: Bangkok, Thailand

Event chronology
ONE Friday Fights 33: Yod-IQ vs. Balyko	ONE Friday Fights 34: Rodtang vs. Superlek	ONE Friday Fights 35: Kongsuk vs. Dedduanglek

ONE Friday Fights 34: Rodtang vs. Superlek (also known as ONE Lumpinee 34) was a combat sports event produced by ONE Championship that took place on September 22, 2023, at Lumpinee Boxing Stadium in Bangkok, Thailand.

=== Background ===
A ONE Flyweight Muay Thai World Championship bout between current champion Rodtang Jitmuangnon and current ONE Flyweight Kickboxing champion Superlek Kiatmuu9 was expected to headline the event. However, Superlek missed the title weight limit by five pounds and the fight was changed to a non-title bout.

=== Bonus awards ===
The following fighters received $20,000 bonuses.

- Performance of the Night: Suakim Sor.Jor.Tongprajin

The following fighters received $10,000 bonuses.

- Performance of the Night: Muangthai P.K.Saenchai, Yodlekpet Or. Atchariya, Miguel Trindade and Songchainoi Kiatsongrit

=== Results ===
ONE Friday Fights 34 (YouTube / Facebook)
Weight Class				Method	Round	Time	Notes
Catchweight (140 lbs) Muay Thai Super Fight	(Thailand) Superlek Kiatmuu9	def.	(Thailand) Rodtang Jitmuangnon (c)	Decision (unanimous) (29–27, 29–27, 29–27)	3	3:00	Non-title bout; Superlek missed weight (140 lbs).
Catchweight (140 lbs) Muay Thai	(Thailand) Saeksan Or. Kwanmuang	def.	(Iran) Amir Naseri	Decision (unanimous)	3	3:00	
Catchweight (138 lbs) Muay Thai	(Thailand) Muangthai P.K.Saenchai	def.	(Thailand) Yodlekpet Or. Atchariya	Decision (unanimous)	3	3:00	
Bantamweight Muay Thai	(Thailand) Kulabdam Sor.Jor.Piek-U-Thai	def.	(Australia) Tyson Harrison	TKO (doctor stoppage)	1	3:00	
Strawweight Kickboxing	(Thailand) Prajanchai P.K.Saenchai	def.	(France) Akram Hamidi	Decision (unanimous)	3	3:00	
Catchweight (147 lbs) Muay Thai	(Portugal) Miguel Trindade	def.	(Thailand) Sibmuen Sitchefboontham	KO (lef hook to the body)	1	2:14	
Catchweight (140 lbs) Muay Thai	(Thailand) Suakim Sor.Jor.Tongprajin	def.	(Iran) Saman Ashouri	KO (right elbow & left straight)	1	2:15	
Catchweight (116 lbs) Muay Thai	(Thailand) Songchainoi Kiatsongrit	def.	(Thailand) Jomhod AutoMuayThai	TKO (three knockdowns / punches)	2	0:54	
Catchweight (127 lbs) Muay Thai	(China) Wei Ziqin	def.	(Thailand) Phetchartchai FightGeekMuayThai	Decision (unanimous)	3	3:00	
Bantamweight	(Mongolia) Shinechagtga Zoltsetseg	def.	(China) Chen Rui	Decision (split)	3	5:00	
Strawweight	(Philippines) Lito Adiwang	def.	(Indonesia) Adrian Mattheis	TKO (punches)	1	0:23	

== ONE Friday Fights 35 ==
ONE Friday Fights 35: Kongsuk vs. Dedduanglek
- Promotion: ONE Championship
- Date: September 29, 2023
- Venue: Lumpinee Boxing Stadium
- City: Bangkok, Thailand

Event chronology
ONE Friday Fights 34: Rodtang vs. Superlek	ONE Friday Fights 35: Kongsuk vs. Dedduanglek	ONE Fight Night 14: Stamp vs. Ham

ONE Friday Fights 35: Kongsuk vs. Dedduanglek (also known as ONE Lumpinee 35) was a combat sports event produced by ONE Championship that took place on September 29, 2023, at Lumpinee Boxing Stadium in Bangkok, Thailand.

=== Background ===
A flyweight muay thai bout between former two-division Lumpinee Stadium world champion Kongsuk Fairtex and Road to ONE Thailand winner Dedduanglek Tded99 served as the event headliner.

=== Bonus awards ===
The following fighters received $10,000 bonuses.

- Performance of the Night: Black Panther, Suriyanlek Por.Yenying, Batman Or.Atchariya, Sakaengam Jitmuangnon and Phetchumpae Highland Gym

=== Results ===
ONE Friday Fights 35 (YouTube / Facebook)
Weight Class				Method	Round	Time	Notes
Flyweight Muay Thai	(Thailand) Dedduanglek Tded99	def.	(Thailand) Kongsuk Fairtex	Decision (unanimous)	3	3:00	
Flyweight Muay Thai	(Thailand) Black Panther	def.	(Thailand) Suriyanlek Por.Yenying	Decision (unanimous)	3	3:00	
Catchweight (136 lbs) Muay Thai	(Thailand) Batman Or.Atchariya	def.	(Thailand) Rungsangtawan Sor.Parrat	KO (left uppercut)	1	1:37	
Catchweight (112 lbs) Muay Thai	(Thailand) Sakaengam Jitmuangnon	def.	(Thailand) Ploykaw VK.Khao Yai	TKO (referee stoppage)	3	0:45	
Catchweight (120 lbs) Muay Thai	(Thailand) Jomhod VK.Khao Yai	def.	(Thailand) Petchparuhat Sitnayoktaweeptapong	Decision (unanimous)	3	3:00	
Bantamweight Muay Thai	(Thailand) Patakaek Theppakin	def.	(Thailand) Prikthaidam Jitmuangnon	Decision (unanimous)	3	3:00	
Catchweight (145,4 lbs) Muay Thai	(Russia) Kiamran Nabati	def.	(Thailand) Pongsiri P.K.Saenchai	Decision (unanimous)	3	3:00	Originally 145 lbs, Pongsiri missed weight.
Bantamweight Muay Thai	(Iran) Sajad Sattari	def.	(Thailand) Rambo Mor.Rattanabandit	Decision (unanimous)	3	3:00	
Featherweight Kickboxing	(Morocco) Mohammed Boutasaa	def.	(Turkey) Furkan Karabağ	Decision (unanimous)	3	3:00	
Lightweight Muay Thai	(Thailand) Chanajon PK.Saenchai	def.	(England) George Jarvis	Decision (split)	3	3:00	
Women's Catchweight (112 lbs) Muay Thai	(Thailand) Phetchumpae Highland Gym	def.	(England) Lisa Brierley	KO (right straight)	1	1:30	
Women's Catchweight (120,8 lbs)	(Malaysia) Jihin Radzuan	def.	(Philippines) Jenelyn Olsim	Submission (armbar)	3	1:34	

== ONE Friday Fights 36 ==
ONE Friday Fights 36: Superball vs. Lobo
- Promotion: ONE Championship
- Date: October 6, 2023
- Venue: Lumpinee Boxing Stadium
- City: Bangkok, Thailand

Event chronology
ONE Fight Night 14: Stamp vs. Ham	ONE Friday Fights 36: Superball vs. Lobo	ONE Fight Night 15: Le vs. Freymanov

ONE Friday Fights 36: Superball vs. Lobo (also known as ONE Lumpinee 36) was a combat sports event produced by ONE Championship that took place on October 6, 2023, at Lumpinee Boxing Stadium in Bangkok, Thailand.

=== Background ===
A 140 pounds catchweight muay thai bout between Superball Tded99 and Welterweight Omnoi Stadium (147 lbs) champion Julio Lobo served as the event headliner.

=== Bonus awards ===
The following fighters received $10,000 bonuses.

- Performance of the Night: Rambong Sor.Therapat, Petchdam Petchkiatpetch, Petchsaenchai MUden-Khonmaibawwee, Johan Ghazali and Kirill Khomutov

=== Results ===
ONE Friday Fights 36 (YouTube / Facebook)
Weight Class				Method	Round	Time	Notes
Catchweight (140 lbs) Muay Thai	(Thailand) Superball Tded99	def.	(Brazil) Julio Lobo	Decision (unanimous)	3	3:00	
Flyweight Muay Thai	(Thailand) Pettonglor Sitluangpeenumfon	def.	(Thailand) Duangsompong Jitmuangnon	Decision (unanimous)	3	3:00	
Catchweight (128 lbs) Muay Thai	(Thailand) Rambong Sor.Therapat	def.	(Thailand) Pansak Wor.Wantawee	KO (punch)	2	1:13	
Catchweight (134 lbs) Muay Thai	(Thailand) Petchdam Petchkiatpetch	def.	(Thailand) Petchpalangchai Por.Jaroenpat	KO (right hook)	1	1:49	
Catchweight (118 lbs) Muay Thai	(Thailand) Maisangkum Sor. Yingcharoenkarnchang	def.	(Thailand) Mungkorn Boomdeksian	Decision (unanimous)	3	3:00	
Catchweight (130 lbs) Muay Thai	(Thailand) Petchsaenchai MUden-Khonmaibawwee	def.	(Thailand) Ngaopayak Adsanpatong	KO (right knee to the body)	2	1:38	
Flyweight Muay Thai	(Malaysia) Johan Ghazali	def.	(Russia) Temirlan Bekmurzaev	KO (left hook to the body)	2	2:43	
Bantamweight Muay Thai	(Russia) Kirill Khomutov	def.	(Thailand) Pornsiri PK.Saenchai	KO (left hook & knee)	1	1:57	
Strawweight Muay Thai	(Spain) Antonio Orden	def.	(Thailand) Pongsiri Sor.Jor.Wichitpadriew	Decision (split)	3	3:00	
Lightweight Muay Thai	(Ghana) Elad Danji Suman	def.	(Russia) Vladimir Gabov	Decision (unanimous)	3	3:00	
Flyweight	(Russia) Zaiundin Suleimanov	def.	(Kyrgyzstan) Adilet Mamytov	TKO (punches)	2	2:46	
Featherweight	(Philippines) Carlos Alvarez	def.	(France) Title Chai	Submission (anaconda choke)	1	0:57	

== ONE Friday Fights 37 ==
ONE Friday Fights 37: Bohic vs. Kacem
- Promotion: ONE Championship
- Date: October 20, 2023
- Venue: Lumpinee Boxing Stadium
- City: Bangkok, Thailand

Event chronology
ONE Fight Night 15: Le vs. Freymanov	ONE Friday Fights 37: Bohic vs. Kacem	ONE Friday Fights 38: Otop vs. Musaev

ONE Friday Fights 37: Bohic vs. Kacem (also known as ONE Lumpinee 37) was a combat sports event produced by ONE Championship that took place on October 20, 2023, at Lumpinee Boxing Stadium in Bangkok, Thailand.

=== Background ===
A bantamweight muay thai bout between former Lumpinee Stadium Welterweight (147 lbs) world champion Rafi Bohic and Antar Kacem served as the event headliner.

=== Bonus awards ===
The following fighters received $10,000 bonuses.

- Performance of the Night: Rittidet Sor.Sommai, Lamnamkhong BS.MuayThai, Kaoklai Chor.Hapayak and Elyes Kacem

=== Results ===
ONE Friday Fights 37 (YouTube / Facebook)
Weight Class				Method	Round	Time	Notes
Bantamweight Muay Thai	(Belarus) Antar Kacem	def.	(France) Rafi Bohic	Decision (unanimous)	3	3:00	
Catchweight (132 lbs) Muay Thai	(Thailand) Rittidet Sor.Sommai	def.	(Thailand) Thepthaksin Sor.Sornsing	KO (right hook)	2	1:59	
Flyweight Muay Thai	(Laos) Lamnamkhong BS.MuayThai	def.	(Thailand) Samoynoi Tor.Phusuwan	KO (punches)	1	2:30	
Catchweight (133 lbs) Muay Thai	(Thailand) Petchsirichai Detpetchsrithong	def.	(Thailand) Songfangkhong FA Group	Decision (split)	3	3:00	
Catchweight (124 lbs) Muay Thai	(Thailand) Kaoklai Chor.Hapayak	def.	(Thailand) Punmongkol Sor.Mongkolkarnchang	KO (punches)	2	1:29	
Catchweight (118 lbs) Muay Thai	(Thailand) Tahaneak Nayokatasala	def.	(Thailand) Mahahin Nakbinalaiyon	Decision (split)	3	3:00	
Flyweight Muay Thai	(Thailand) Kongthoranee Sor.Sommai	def.	(Japan) Taiki Naito	Decision (unanimous)	3	3:00	
Catchweight (128 lbs) Muay Thai	(Uzbekistan) Aslamjon Ortikov	def.	(Thailand) Pethuahin Jitmuangnon	TKO (left hook & head kick)	3	0:50	
Catchweight (130 lbs) Muay Thai	(Belarus) Elyes Kacem	def.	(Thailand) Chai SorSor.Toipadriew	KO (head kick)	2	2:43	
Flyweight	(Armenia) Moris Boleyan	def.	(Mongolia) Gantogtokh Baatarchuluun	Submission (guillotine choke)	1	2:23	
Bantamweight	(Philippines) Carlo Bumina-ang	def.	(Russia) Denis Andreev	Decision (split)	3	5:00	
Catchweight (130 lbs)	(Uzbekistan) Komronbek Ortikov	def.	(Kenya) Percival Oumo Mwambi	Decision (unanimous)	3	5:00	

== ONE Friday Fights 38 ==
ONE Friday Fights 38: Otop vs. Musaev
- Promotion: ONE Championship
- Date: October 27, 2023
- Venue: Lumpinee Boxing Stadium
- City: Bangkok, Thailand

Event chronology
ONE Friday Fights 37: Bohic vs. Kacem	ONE Friday Fights 38: Otop vs. Musaev	ONE Friday Fights 39: Kongklai vs. Şen

ONE Friday Fights 38: Otop vs. Musaev (also known as ONE Lumpinee 38) was a combat sports event produced by ONE Championship that took place on October 27, 2023, at Lumpinee Boxing Stadium in Bangkok, Thailand.

=== Background ===
A bantamweight muay thai bout between Otop Or.Kwanmuang and Ilyas Musaev served as the event headliner.

=== Bonus awards ===
The following fighters received $10,000 bonuses.

- Performance of the Night: Ilyas Musaev, Puengluang Baanramba, Petchgarfield Jitmuangnon, Numpangna EagleMuayThai, Yodsingdam Kiatkamthorn, Lenny Blasi and Fritz Aldin Biagtan

=== Results ===
ONE Friday Fights 38 (YouTube / Facebook)
Weight Class				Method	Round	Time	Notes
Bantamweight Muay Thai	(Russia) Ilyas Musaev	def.	(Thailand) Otop Or.Kwanmuang	KO (right hook)	1	2:59	
Catchweight (132 lbs) Muay Thai	(Thailand) Chorfah Tor.Sangtiennoi	def.	(Thailand) Pompetch P.K.Saenchai	Decision (unanimous)	3	3:00	
Catchweight (127 lbs) Muay Thai	(Thailand) Singdomthong Nokjeanladkrabang	def.	(Scotland) Stephen Irvine	Decision (majority)	3	3:00	
Flyweight Muay Thai	(Thailand) Puengluang Baanramba	def.	(Myanmar) Sonrak Fairtex	KO (right hook)	2	0:16	
Catchweight (140 lbs) Muay Thai	(Thailand) Petchgarfield Jitmuangnon	def.	(Thailand) Numpangna EagleMuayThai	Decision (unanimous)	3	3:00	
Strawweight Muay Thai	(Thailand) Yodsingdam Kiatkamthorn	def.	(Thailand) Chalawan Ngorbangkapi	TKO (three knockdowns)	1	1:45	
Bantamweight Muay Thai	(Uzbekistan) Mavlud Tupiev	def.	(Thailand) Yodphupa Wimanair	Decision (majority)	3	3:00	
Featherweight Muay Thai	(Japan) Katsuki Kitano	def.	(Turkey) Halil Kütükçü	Decision (unanimous)	3	3:00	
Bantamweight Muay Thai	(Italy) Lenny Blasi	def.	(Thailand) Nonthakit Tor.Morsi	KO (left hook to the body)	3	0:55	
Catchweight (146.8 lbs)	(New Zealand) Mark Abelardo	def.	(Russia) Georgy Shakhruramazanov	TKO (punches)	2	4:43	Originally Bantamweight bout; Shakhruramazanov missed weight (146.8 lb).
Flyweight	(Philippines) Fritz Aldin Biagtan	def.	(India) Deepak Bhardwaj	TKO (knees to the body and punches)	1	1:13	

== ONE Friday Fights 39 ==
ONE Friday Fights 39: Kongklai vs. Şen
- Promotion: ONE Championship
- Date: November 3, 2023
- Venue: Lumpinee Boxing Stadium
- City: Bangkok, Thailand

Event chronology
ONE Friday Fights 38: Otop vs. Musaev	ONE Friday Fights 39: Kongklai vs. Şen	ONE Fight Night 16: Haggerty vs. Andrade

ONE Friday Fights 39: Kongklai vs. Şen (also known as ONE Lumpinee 39) was a combat sports event produced by ONE Championship that took place on November 3, 2023, at Lumpinee Boxing Stadium in Bangkok, Thailand.

=== Background ===
A 142-pounds catchweight muay thai bout between former Super Lightweight Omnoi Stadium (140 lbs) champion Kongklai AnnyMuayThai and Soner Şen served as the event headliner.

=== Bonus awards ===
The following fighters received $10,000 bonuses.

- Performance of the Night: Soner Şen, ET Tded99, Jack Jackmuaythai Gym, Nongchamp Luckybantermg, Amnuaydet Wor.Wantawee and Longern Paesaisee

=== Results ===
ONE Friday Fights 39 (YouTube / Facebook)
Weight Class				Method	Round	Time	Notes
Catchweight (142 lbs) Muay Thai	(Turkey) Soner Şen	def.	(Thailand) Kongklai AnnyMuayThai	KO (punches)	1	2:35	
Catchweight (130 lbs) Muay Thai	(Thailand) ET Tded99	def.	(Thailand) Mongkolkaew Sor.Sommai	TKO (left elbow)	3	1:02	
Catchweight (129 lbs) Muay Thai	(Thailand) Samingdam Chor.Ajalaboon	def.	(Thailand) Denkriangkrai Singha Mawynn	Decision (unanimous)	3	3:00	
Catchweight (138 lbs) Muay Thai	(Thailand) Jack Jackmuaythai Gym	def.	(Thailand) Darkie Nokkhao KorMor.11	KO (left kick to the body)	1	0:45	
Catchweight (112 lbs) Muay Thai	(Thailand) Nongchamp Luckybantermg	def.	(Thailand) Petake Kiatjamroon	KO (left hook to the body)	2	1:39	
Catchweight (120 lbs) Muay Thai	(Thailand) Amnuaydet Wor.Wantawee	def.	(Thailand) Petchleela M.U. Den	KO (left elbow)	1	2:39	
Catchweight (146 lbs) Muay Thai	(Russia) Vladimir Kuzmin	def.	(Portugal) Fabio Reis	Decision (unanimous)	3	3:00	
Bantamweight Muay Thai	(Russia) Abdollah Dayakaev	def.	(Thailand) Detrit LooksuanAutomuaythai	Decision (majority)	3	3:00	
Catchweight (127 lbs) Muay Thai	(Thailand) Longern Paesaisee	def.	(France) Karim Dahou	TKO (left high kick)	1	2:32	
Catchweight (143 lbs) Muay Thai	(Hungary) Patrick Szana	def.	(Thailand) Mardsing Khaolakmuaythai	Decision (unanimous)	3	3:00	
Lightweight	(Brazil) Lucas Gabriel	def.	(Russia) Kurbanali Isabekov	Decision (unanimous)	3	5:00	
Strawweight	(Philippines) Moises Lois Ilogon	def.	(South Korea) Cho Joon-gun	TKO (punches)	3	2:17	

== ONE Friday Fights 40 ==
ONE Friday Fights 40: Jaosuayai vs. Paidang
- Promotion: ONE Championship
- Date: November 10, 2023
- Venue: Lumpinee Boxing Stadium
- City: Bangkok, Thailand

Event chronology
ONE Fight Night 16: Haggerty vs. Andrade	ONE Friday Fights 40: Jaosuayai vs. Paidang	ONE Friday Fights 41: Dedduanglek vs. Nakrob

ONE Friday Fights 40: Jaosuayai vs. Paidang (also known as ONE Lumpinee 40) was a combat sports event produced by ONE Championship that took place on November 10, 2023, at Lumpinee Boxing Stadium in Bangkok, Thailand.

=== Background ===
A flyweight muay thai bout between Jaosuayai Sor.Dechapan and Paidang Kiatsongrit served as the event headliner.

=== Bonus awards ===
The following fighters received $10,000 bonuses.

- Performance of the Night: Jaosuayai Sor.Dechapan, Aliff Sor.Dechapan, Khunsuk Sor.Dechapan, Ricardo Bravo and Parham Gheiratimarkeye

=== Results ===
ONE Friday Fights 40 (YouTube / Facebook)
Weight Class				Method	Round	Time	Notes
Flyweight Muay Thai	(Thailand) Jaosuayai Sor.Dechapan	def.	(Thailand) Paidang Kiatsongrit	KO (left hook)	2	2:21	
Catchweight (120 lbs) Muay Thai	(Malaysia) Aliff Sor.Dechapan	def.	(Iran) Peyman Zolfaghari	KO (three knockdowns / left hook)	1	1:44	
Catchweight (123 lbs) Muay Thai	(Thailand) Petchpailin Sor.Jor.Tongprajin	def.	(Thailand) Bhumjaithai Mor.Tor.1	Decision (unanimous)	3	3:00	
Catchweight (113 lbs) Muay Thai	(Thailand) Khunsuk Sor.Dechapan	def.	(Thailand) Detchphupa ChotBangsaen	KO (punches to the body)	2	1:39	
Catchweight (122 lbs) Muay Thai	(Iran) Merhdad Khanzadeh	def.	(Thailand) Yangdam Sor.Tor.Hiewbangsaen	Decision (unanimous)	3	3:00	
Women's Catchweight (110 lbs) Muay Thai	(Thailand) Nongam Fairtex	def.	(Thailand) Phetchumpae Highland Gym	Decision (unanimous)	3	3:00	
Catchweight (165 lbs) Muay Thai	(Argentina) Ricardo Bravo	def.	(Norway) Oliver Hansen	KO (three knockdowns / punches)	3	2:59	
Catchweight (126 lbs) Muay Thai	(Spain) Xavier Gonzalez	def.	(Lebanon) Omar El Halabi	Decision (unanimous)	3	3:00	
Flyweight Muay Thai	(Brazil) Rhuam Felipe Morais Caldas	def.	(Thailand) Samingdam LooksuanAutomuaythai	Decision (split)	3	3:00	
Bantamweight Muay Thai	(Iran) Parham Gheiratimarkeye	def.	(Thailand) Samingnum M Ekachart	KO (right elbow)	2	2:39	
Bantamweight	(England) Ben Royle	def.	(Russia) Ivan Parshikov	Decision (unanimous)	3	5:00	
Flyweight	(Australia) Coopar Royal	def.	(Philippines) Ely Malinis Fernandez	Submission (rear-naked choke)	1	1:38	

== ONE Friday Fights 41 ==
ONE Friday Fights 41: Dedduanglek vs. Nakrob
- Promotion: ONE Championship
- Date: November 17, 2023
- Venue: Lumpinee Boxing Stadium
- City: Bangkok, Thailand

Event chronology
ONE Friday Fights 40: Jaosuayai vs. Paidang	ONE Friday Fights 41: Dedduanglek vs. Nakrob	ONE Friday Fights 42: Anane vs. Yamin

ONE Friday Fights 41: Dedduanglek vs. Nakrob (also known as ONE Lumpinee 41) was a combat sports event produced by ONE Championship that took place on November 17, 2023, at Lumpinee Boxing Stadium in Bangkok, Thailand.

=== Background ===
A flyweight muay thai bout between Road to ONE Thailand Season 1 winner Dedduanglek Tded99 and Nakrob Fairtex served as the event headliner.

=== Bonus awards ===
The following fighters received $10,000 bonuses.

- Performance of the Night: Nakrob Fairtex, Songchainoi Kiatsongrit, Suriyanlek Por.Yenying, Parnpet Sor.Jor.Lekmuangnon and Yodnumchai Fairtex

=== Results ===
ONE Friday Fights 41 (YouTube / Facebook)
Weight Class				Method	Round	Time	Notes
Flyweight Muay Thai	(Thailand) Nakrob Fairtex	def.	(Thailand) Dedduanglek Tded99	TKO (right straight to the body)	3	0:51	
Catchweight (116 lbs) Muay Thai	(Thailand) Songchainoi Kiatsongrit	def.	(Thailand) Rak Erawan	Decision (unanimous)	3	3:00	
Catchweight (132 lbs) Muay Thai	(Thailand) Suriyanlek Por.Yenying	def.	(Thailand) Tomyamkoong Bhumjaithai	KO (punches)	3	2:47	
Catchweight (138 lbs) Muay Thai	(Thailand) Buakhiao Por.Paoin	def.	(Thailand) Paruehatnoi TBM Gym	Decision (unanimous)	3	3:00	
Catchweight (126 lbs) Muay Thai	(Thailand) Parnpet Sor.Jor.Lekmuangnon	def.	(Iran) Meysam Adelniya	TKO (left hook)	2	0:30	
Catchweight (114 lbs) Muay Thai	(Thailand) Yodnumchai Fairtex	def.	(Thailand) Champagnarm Por.Pramuk	KO (three knockdowns / left elbow)	1	2:21	
Catchweight (136 lbs) Muay Thai	(Russia) Tagir Khalilov	def.	(Thailand) Yodlekpet Or. Atchariya	Decision (split)	3	3:00	
Catchweight (126 lbs) Kickboxing	(Thailand) View Petchkoson	def.	(Russia) Aslanbek Zikreev	Decision (unanimous)	3	3:00	
Flyweight Muay Thai	(Myanmar) Sulaiman LooksuanMuayThai	def.	(United States) Kijani Aytch	Decision (unanimous)	3	3:00	
Flyweight	(Russia) Ruslan Satiev	def.	(Azerbaijan) Farid Alibabazade	Decision (split)	3	5:00	
Welterweight	(Russia) Gadzhimurad Amirzhanov	def.	(Iran) Morteza Noroozi	TKO (elbows)	2	3:25	

== ONE Friday Fights 42 ==
ONE Friday Fights 42: Kaonar vs. Lobo
- Promotion: ONE Championship
- Date: November 24, 2023
- Venue: Lumpinee Boxing Stadium
- City: Bangkok, Thailand

Event chronology
ONE Friday Fights 41: Dedduanglek vs. Nakrob	ONE Friday Fights 42: Kaonar vs. Lobo	ONE Friday Fights 43: Kongsuk vs. Pettonglor

ONE Friday Fights 42: Kaonar vs. Lobo (also known as ONE Lumpinee 42) was a combat sports event produced by ONE Championship that took place on November 24, 2023, at Lumpinee Boxing Stadium in Bangkok, Thailand.

=== Background ===
A flyweight muay thai bout between Nabil Anane and Yamin Or.Primonsri was expected to headline the event. However, Yamin withdrew due to illness. As a results, a 141 pounds catchweight muay thai bout between Kaonar Sor.Jor.Tongprajin and Julio Lobo promoted to main event status.

=== Bonus awards ===
The following fighters received $10,000 bonuses.

- Performance of the Night: Khunponnoi Sor.Sommai, Sornsueknoi FA Group, Kongkairop FiatPathum and Yu Yau Pui

=== Results ===
ONE Friday Fights 42 (YouTube / Facebook)
Weight Class				Method	Round	Time	Notes
Catchweight (141 lbs) Muay Thai	(Brazil) Julio Lobo	def.	(Thailand) Kaonar Sor.Jor.Tongprajin	KO (punches)	3	0:46	Lobo missed weight (141.4 lbs).
Bantamweight Muay Thai	(Thailand) Ferrari Fairtex	def.	(Russia) Kirill Khomutov	Decision (unanimous)	3	3:00	
Catchweight (136 lbs) Muay Thai	(Thailand) Khunponnoi Sor.Sommai	def.	(Laos) Lamnamkhong BS.MuayThai	KO (right hook to the body)	2	2:00	
Catchweight (128 lbs) Muay Thai	(Thailand) Sornsueknoi FA Group	def.	(Thailand) Petchkhaowang Sor.Jor.Lekmuangnon	TKO (punches and left elbows)	2	1:16	
Catchweight (112 lbs) Muay Thai	(Thailand) Kongkairop FiatPathum	def.	(Thailand) Rachan Sor.Somnuk	KO (left elbow)	3	1:28	
Catchweight (112 lbs) Muay Thai	(Thailand) Ploykhao Or.AudUdon	def.	(Thailand) Fahlan Por.Petchkaikaew	Decision (unanimous)	3	3:00	
Bantamweight Kickboxing	(Russia) Elbrus Osmanov	def.	(China) Zhang Chenglong	Decision (unanimous)	3	3:00	
Flyweight Muay Thai	(Thailand) Seksan Fairtex	def.	(Thailand) Joker Paesaisee	Decision (majority)	3	3:00	
Women's Atomweight Muay Thai	(Hong Kong) Yu Yau Pui	def.	(Turkey) Zehra Doğan	TKO (punches to the body)	2	1:28	
Strawweight	(Uzbekistan) Sanzhar Zakirov	def.	(Russia) Zaiundin Suleimanov	Decision (unanimous)	3	5:00	
Lightweight	(Brazil) Matheus Pereira	def.	(India) Sumit Bhyan	TKO (punches)	1	1:08	
Welterweight	(Brazil) Bismarck Gomes	def.	(Kyrgyzstan) Asylbek Almasbekov	Submission (rear-naked choke)	1	2:23	

== ONE Friday Fights 43 ==
ONE Friday Fights 43: Kongsuk vs. Pettonglor
- Promotion: ONE Championship
- Date: December 1, 2023
- Venue: Lumpinee Boxing Stadium
- City: Bangkok, Thailand

Event chronology
ONE Friday Fights 42: Kaonar vs. Lobo	ONE Friday Fights 43: Kongsuk vs. Pettonglor	ONE Friday Fights 44: Yod-IQ vs. Musaev

ONE Friday Fights 43: Kongsuk vs. Pettonglor (also known as ONE Lumpinee 43) was a combat sports event produced by ONE Championship that took place on December 1, 2023, at Lumpinee Boxing Stadium in Bangkok, Thailand.

=== Background ===
A flyweight muay thai bout between Kongsuk Fairtex and Pettonglor Sitluangpeenumfon headlined the event.

=== Bonus awards ===
The following fighters received $10,000 bonuses.

- Performance of the Night: Kongthoranee Sor.Sommai, Petchnamkhong Mongkolpetch, Aslamjon Ortikov and Mustafa Al Tekreeti

=== Results ===
ONE Friday Fights 43 (YouTube / Facebook)
Weight Class				Method	Round	Time	Notes
Flyweight Muay Thai	(Thailand) Pettonglor Sitluangpeenumfon	def.	(Thailand) Kongsuk Fairtex	Decision (split)	3	3:00	
Flyweight Muay Thai	(Thailand) Kongthoranee Sor.Sommai	def.	(Iran) Parsa Aminipour	KO (left elbow)	3	1:07	
Catchweight (139 lbs) Muay Thai	(Thailand) Sibsan Nokkhao KorMor11	def.	(Uganda) Award Kazimba	Decision (unanimous)	3	3:00	
Atomweight Muay Thai	(Thailand) Chokdee Maxjandee	def.	(Iraq) Yousif Kadir	KO (punches)	2	0:48	
Catchweight (124 lbs) Muay Thai	(Thailand) Jomjai NaksuGym	def.	(Thailand) Kaoklai Chor.Hapayak	Decision (unanimous)	3	3:00	
Catchweight (122 lbs) Muay Thai	(Laos) Petchnamkhong Mongkolpetch	def.	(Thailand) BM Fairtex	KO (right uppercut)	3	1:45	
Catchweight (129 lbs) Muay Thai	(Uzbekistan) Aslamjon Ortikov	def.	(Thailand) Chatanan Sor.Jor.Joyprajin	KO (head kick)	1	2:33	
Lightweight Muay Thai	(Iraq) Mustafa Al Tekreeti	def.	(Thailand) Chanajon PK.Saenchai	KO (right uppercut)	2	1:43	
Catchweight (126 lbs) Muay Thai	(Thailand) Rambong Sor.Therapat	def.	(China) Jiduo Yibu	Decision (unanimous)	3	3:00	
Featherweight	(Mongolia) Nachin Sat	def.	(Philippines) Carlos Alvarez	TKO (punches)	2	4:27	
Strawweight	(Japan) Ryosuke Honda	def.	(Philippines) Dave Bangguigui	Decision (unanimous)	3	5:00	
Women's Strawweight	(Australia) Faine Mesquita	def.	(Kyrgyzstan) Baktygul Kurmanbekova	Decision (unanimous)	3	5:00	

== ONE Friday Fights 44 ==
ONE Friday Fights 44: Yod-IQ vs. Musaev
- Promotion: ONE Championship
- Date: December 8, 2023
- Venue: Lumpinee Boxing Stadium
- City: Bangkok, Thailand

Event chronology
ONE Friday Fights 43: Kongsuk vs. Pettonglor	ONE Friday Fights 44: Yod-IQ vs. Musaev	ONE Fight Night 17: Kryklia vs. Roberts

ONE Friday Fights 44: Yod-IQ vs. Musaev (also known as ONE Lumpinee 44) was a combat sports event produced by ONE Championship that took place on December 8, 2023, at Lumpinee Boxing Stadium in Bangkok, Thailand.

=== Background ===
A bantamweight muay thai bout between Yod-IQ Or.Pimonsri and Ilyas Musaev served as the event headliner.

=== Bonus awards ===
The following fighters received $10,000 bonuses.

- Performance of the Night: Pompetch P.K.Saenchai, Maisangkum Sor. Yingcharoenkarnchang, Ganchai Jitmuangnon and Sungprab Lookpichit

=== Results ===
ONE Friday Fights 44 (YouTube / Facebook)
Weight Class				Method	Round	Time	Notes
Bantamweight Muay Thai	(Thailand) Yod-IQ Or.Pimolsri	def.	(Russia) Ilyas Musaev	Decision (split)	3	3:00	
Catchweight (132 lbs) Muay Thai	(Thailand) Pompetch P.K.Saenchai	def.	(Thailand) Rittidet Sor.Sommai	TKO (punches)	3	1:56	
Catchweight (119 lbs) Muay Thai	(Thailand) Maisangkum Sor. Yingcharoenkarnchang	def.	(Thailand) Chalamdam Nayokathasala	KO (left hook to the body)	1	2:54	
Bantamweight Muay Thai	(Thailand) Peemai Por.Kobkua	def.	(Thailand) Thanungern FA Group	Decision (unanimous)	3	3:00	
Catchweight (124 lbs) Muay Thai	(Thailand) Ganchai Jitmuangnon	def.	(Thailand) Binladin Sangmorakot	KO (head kick)	1	2:24	
Catchweight (112 lbs) Muay Thai	(Thailand) Sungprab Lookpichit	def.	(Thailand) Petchmuangthai TBM Gym	KO (right hook)	2	2:12	
Bantamweight Muay Thai	(Thailand) Avatar P.K.Saenchai	def.	(China) Wang Kaifeng	Decision (unanimous)	3	3:00	
Bantamweight Muay Thai	(Turkey) Ferzan Çiçek	def.	(Italy) Lenny Blasi	Decision (unanimous)	3	3:00	
Women's Strawweight Muay Thai	(Brazil) Yuly Alves	def.	(Netherlands) Chellina Chirino	Decision (split)	3	3:00	
Flyweight	(Afghanistan) Babar Ali	def.	(Philippines) Fritz Biagtan	Decision (unanimous)	3	5:00	
Bantamweight	(Philippines) Carlo Bumina-ang	def.	(Turkey) Ilyas Dursun	KO (punch)	1	0:23	
Flyweight	(Portugal) Leandro Gomes	def.	(Iran) Milad Hosseini	TKO (punches)	3	2:47	

== ONE Friday Fights 45 ==
ONE Friday Fights 45: Otop vs. Şen
- Promotion: ONE Championship
- Date: December 15, 2023
- Venue: Lumpinee Boxing Stadium
- City: Bangkok, Thailand

Event chronology
ONE Fight Night 17: Kryklia vs. Roberts	ONE Friday Fights 45: Otop vs. Şen	ONE Friday Fights 46: Tawanchai vs. Superbon

ONE Friday Fights 45: Otop vs. Şen (also known as ONE Lumpinee 45) was a combat sports event produced by ONE Championship that took place on December 15, 2023, at Lumpinee Boxing Stadium in Bangkok, Thailand.

=== Background ===
A bantamweight muay thai bout between Otop Or.Kwanmuang and Soner Şen served as the event headliner.

=== Bonus awards ===
The following fighters received $10,000 bonuses.

- Performance of the Night: Soner Şen, Chartpayak Saksatun, Pettasuea Seeopal, Charlie Singha Mawynn and Furkan Karabağ

=== Results ===
ONE Friday Fights 45 (YouTube / Facebook)
Weight Class				Method	Round	Time	Notes
Bantamweight Muay Thai	(Turkey) Soner Şen	def.	(Thailand) Otop Or.Kwanmuang	KO (punch)	1	1:47	
Catchweight (126 lbs) Muay Thai	(Thailand) Chartpayak Saksatun	def.	(Thailand) Dabdam Por.Tor.Tor.Thongtawee	KO (punch)	1	1:00	
Catchweight (120 lbs) Muay Thai	(Thailand) Pettasuea Seeopal	def.	(Thailand) Singmanee Surasakmontri	KO (left hook)	1	1:14	
Catchweight (126 lbs) Muay Thai	(Thailand) Charlie Singha Mawynn	def.	(Thailand) Silapetch Por.Petchkaikaew	KO (punches)	2	2:28	
Catchweight (118 lbs) Muay Thai	(Thailand) Jaoinsee P.K.Saenchai	def.	(Thailand) Ratchamongkol Maethongbairecycle	Decision (unanimous)	3	3:00	
Catchweight (140 lbs) Muay Thai	(Thailand) Apisit Fairtex	def.	(Hungary) Patrick Szana	Decision (unanimous)	3	3:00	
Catchweight (130 lbs) Muay Thai	(Lebanon) Omar El Halabi	def.	(Thailand) Yodtongthai Sor.Sommai	Decision (majority)	3	3:00	
Flyweight Muay Thai	(Thailand) Jaruadsuk Sor.Jor.Wichitpadriew	def.	(Kyrgyzstan) Sherzod Kabutov	Decision (split)	3	3:00	
Featherweight Muay Thai	(Turkey) Furkan Karabağ	def.	(Italy) Lorenzo Di Vara	TKO (three knockdowns / uppercut)	2	2:00	
Featherweight	(Azerbaijan) Suleyman Suleymanov	def.	(Kyrgyzstan) Nursultan Toktorov	Submission (guillotine choke)	2	0:12	
Flyweight	(Pakistan) Ismail Khan	def.	(Nepal) Rabindra Dhant	Decision (unanimous)	3	5:00	

== See also ==
- List of current ONE fighters
- 2023 in UFC
- 2023 in Bellator MMA
- 2023 in Professional Fighters League
- 2023 in Absolute Championship Akhmat
- 2023 in Konfrontacja Sztuk Walki
- 2023 in Rizin Fighting Federation
- 2023 in LUX Fight League
- 2023 in Brave Combat Federation
- 2023 in Legacy Fighting Alliance
- 2023 in Road FC
- 2023 in Glory
- 2023 in K-1
- 2023 in RISE
- 2023 in Romanian kickboxing
- 2023 in Wu Lin Feng
