= Joseph Lasiri =

Moroccan-Italian Muay Thai fighter

- Born: 19 July 1991 (age 35); Monza, Italy
- Other names: The Hurricane
- Nationality: Italian; Moroccan
- Height: 170 cm (5 ft 7 in)
- Weight: 56.7 kg (125 lb; 8.93 st)
- Division: Strawweight (ONE); Flyweight (ONE); Super bantamweight Bantamweight
- Reach: 70 in (178 cm)
- Style: Muay Thai
- Fighting out of: Milan, Italy
- Team: Team Lasiri; Kick And Punch Milano

Kickboxing record
- Total: 56
- Wins: 43
- By knockout: 20
- Losses: 13

Other information
- Occupation: Instructor/Athlete

Joseph Lasiri (born July 19, 1991) is an Italian-Moroccan Muay Thai fighter. He is currently signed to ONE Championship, where he is the former ONE Strawweight Muay Thai World Champion.

Lasiri is a WBC Muay Thai World Bantamweight Champion and a 5-times World Muay Thai Organization Pro-Am Champion.

== Titles and Accomplishments ==
=== Amateur ===
- International Federation of Muaythai Associations
  - 2012 IFMA European -54 kg / 118 lb C bronze
- World Muaythai Federation
  - 2012 WMF European Champion 51 kg /gold Bulgaria
  - 2013 WMF World pro-am -51 kg Champion
- World Muaythai Organization
  - 2014 WMO World Champion/pro-am/54 kg
  - 2015 WMO World Champion/pro-am/54 kg
  - 2016 WMO World Champion/pro-am/54 kg
  - 2017 WMO World Champion/pro-am/54 kg

=== Professional ===
- ONE Championship
  - ONE Strawweight Muay Thai World Championship (One time, former)
  - Performance of the Night (One time) vs. Prajanchai P.K.Saenchai
- World Fighters Council
  - 2012 WFC European 56 kg champion
  - 2013 WFC European -56 kg Champion
- World Boxing Council Muaythai
  - 2017 WBC Muay Thai World Bantamweight -53.5 kg / 118 lb Champion

== Muay Thai record ==
Professional Muay Thai Record
43 Wins (20 (T)KO's), 14 Losses, 0 Draws
Date	Result	Opponent	Event	Location	Method	Round	Time
2023-12-22	Loss	(Thailand) Prajanchai P.K.Saenchaimuaythaigym	ONE Friday Fights 46	Bangkok, Thailand	KO (elbow)	1	1:28
Unifying the ONE Strawweight Muay Thai World Championship.
2022-11-19	Loss	(Thailand) Rodtang Jitmuangnon	ONE on Prime Video 4	Kallang, Singapore	Decision (unanimous)	5	3:00
For the ONE Flyweight Muay Thai World Championship.
2022-05-20	Win	(Thailand) Prajanchai P.K.Saenchaimuaythaigym	ONE 157	Kallang, Singapore	TKO (retirement)	3	3:00
Wins the ONE Strawweight Muay Thai World Championship.
2021-12-03	Win	(Japan) Asahi Shinagawa	ONE: Winter Warriors II	Kallang, Singapore	KO (Punch & knee)	1	2:06
2021-04-02	Loss	(Thailand) Panpetch Or.Pitisak	Muaymanwansuk, Rangsit Stadium	Rangsit, Thailand	Decision	5	3:00
2020-11-20	Win	(Australia) Rocky Ogden	ONE Championship: Inside the Matrix 4	Kallang, Singapore	Decision (Split)	3	3:00
2019-09-06	Loss	(Thailand) Mongkolpetch Petchyindee	ONE Championship: Immortal Triumph	Ho Chi Minh City, Vietnam	Decision (Majority)	3	3:00
2019-03-31	Win	(Japan) Hiroki Akimoto	ONE Championship: A New Era	Tokyo, Japan	Decision (Majority)	3	3:00
2019-01-18	Loss	(England) Jonathan Haggerty	ONE Championship: Eternal Glory	Jakarta, Indonesia	Decision (Unanimous)	3	3:00
2018-11-23	Loss	(Australia) Josh Tonna	ONE Championship: Pursuit of Greatness	Yangon, Myanmar	Decision (Unanimous)	3	3:00
2018-05-18	Loss	(Thailand) Singtongnoi Por.Telakun	ONE Championship: Unstoppable Dreams	Kallang, Singapore	TKO (Doctor Stoppage)	2	2:36
2018-01-26	Loss	(Thailand) Sam-A Gaiyanghadao	ONE Championship: Global Superheroes	Manila, Philippines	KO (Straight Left)	2	2:30
2017-04-15	Win	(France) Tristan Caetano	Divonne Challenge 3	France	Decision	3	3:00
2017-02-18	Win	(France) Mohamed Bouchareb	Ring War	Monza, Italy	Decision	5	3:00
Wins WBC Muay Thai World Bantamweight -53.5kg title.
2016-10-02	Loss	(Thailand) Yodkowklai Fairtex	MAX Muay Thai	Thailand	KO	1	
2015-12-12	Win	(France) Tristan Caetano	The Night of Kick and Punch 2015	Italy	KO (Punches and Knee)	2	
2015-10-24	Loss	(Algeria) Islem Hamech	La Nuit Des Challenges 14	France	Decision	3	3:00
2015-04-26	Win	(United Kingdom) Andy Howson		United Kingdom	TKO	2	
2014-10-19	Win	(United Kingdom) Reece Thomson		London, England	Decision	5	3:00
2014-04-12	Win	(France) Antar Kacem	Championnat du Monde de Boxe Thai	France	Decision	5	3:00
2014-04-12	Win	(Italy) Daniel Saporito	Ring War	Italy	Decision	3	3:00
2013-11-09	Win	(Switzerland) Pascal Kessler		Switzerland	TKO (Knees)		
Wins the WFC European -53kg title.
2013-05-18	Win	(Italy) Matteo Fossati	The Night of Kick and Punch III	Italy	TKO (Corner Stoppage)	1	3:00
2012-02-09	Loss	(Serbia) Boban Marinkovic		Jagodina, Serbia	Decision (Unanimous)	5	3:00
For the WAKO Pro Low Kick World -57kg title.
2011-10-30	Loss	(United Kingdom) Dean James	Night Of Champions	United Kingdom	TKO (Knee)	2	
2011-09-25	Win	(Italy) Christian Lusabio		Milan, Italy	Decision	3	3:00
Legend: Win Loss Draw/No contest Notes
