= ONE Friday Fights 1 =

Combat sport events in 2023

ONE Friday Fights: Nong-O vs. Ramazanov
- The poster for ONE Friday Fights: Nong-O vs. Ramazanov
- Promotion: ONE Championship
- Date: January 20, 2023
- Venue: Lumpinee Boxing Stadium
- City: Bangkok, Thailand

Event chronology
| ONE Fight Night 6: Superbon vs. Allazov | ONE Friday Fights: Nong-O vs. Ramazanov | ONE Friday Fights: Sangmanee vs. Kulabdam 2 |

ONE Friday Fights: Nong-O vs. Ramazanov (also known as ONE Lumpinee 1) was a combat sport event produced by ONE Championship that took place on January 20, 2023, at Lumpinee Boxing Stadium in Bangkok, Thailand.

== Background ==
The event marked the promotion's first venue in Lumpinee Boxing Stadium which is a standard Muay Thai stadium in Thailand. In this the ONE Lumpinee event will be broadcast live on Channel 7 HD in Friday at 20:30PM (UTC+07:00).

A ONE Bantamweight Muay Thai World Championship bout between current champion Nong-O Gaiyanghadao and former ONE Bantamweight Kickboxing Champion Alaverdi Ramazanov was originally to take place at ONE on Prime Video 6 but the bout announced moved to headline this event. The pairing was previously scheduled at ONE: X, but Ramazanov pull out from the card due to the 2022 Russian invasion of Ukraine, all Russian athletes were removed from the card as a result of the Singaporean government banning them from entering the country.

At the weigh-ins, Saensiri Petch Por.Tor.Or, Mavlud Tupiev and Keivan Soleimani all failed hydration test and were forced to take catchweights. Saensiri weighed in at 151 pounds, 6 pounds over the limit, Tupiev came in at 147 pounds, 2 pounds over the bantamweight limit, Soleimani weighed in at 177 pounds, 7 pounds over the lightweight limit. Both bouts proceeded at catchweight. Saensiri, Tupiev and Soleimani was fined their purse, which went to their opponent Khomarwut F.A.Group, Muangthai P.K.Saenchai and Josh Hill.

== Results ==
Main card (YouTube / Watch ONE)
| Weight class | | | | Method | Round | Time | Notes |
|---|---|---|---|---|---|---|---|
| Bantamweight Muay Thai | Nong-O Gaiyanghadao (c) | def. | Alaverdi Ramazanov | KO (punches) | 3 | 2:14 | (Note: For the ONE Bantamweight Muay Thai World Championship.) |
| Strawweight Muay Thai | Prajanchai P.K.Saenchai | def. | Kompetch Sitsarawatsuer | Decision (unanimous) | 3 | 5:00 |
| Atomweight Muay Thai | Khunsueklek Boomdeksian | def. | Petchbanrai Singha Mawynn | Decision (unanimous) | 3 | 3:00 |
| Catchweight (151 lbs) Muay Thai | Khomarwut F.A.Group | def. | Saensiri Petch Por.Tor.Or | Decision (unanimous) | 3 | 3:00 | (Note: Saensiri missed weight (151 lbs). Originally scorecard as a unanimous draw (28–28, 28–28, 28–28) but the organization doesn't draw and Khomarwut won due to Saensiri knockdown in Round 1.) |
| Flyweight Muay Thai | Sonrak Fairtex | def. | Tai Sor.Jor. Piek-U-Thai | Decision (majority) | 3 | 3:00 |
| Catchweight (112 lbs) Muay Thai | Sakaengam Jitmuangnon | def. | Suayai Chor.Hapayak | KO (punch) | 1 | 2:47 |
Preliminary card (FanDuel TV)
| Catchweight (140 lbs) Muay Thai | Saeksan Or. Kwanmuang | def. | Tyson Harrison | Decision (split) | 3 | 3:00 |
| Lightweight | Richard Godoy | def. | Alexy Lyapunov | Decision (split) | 3 | 5:00 |
| Catchweight (147 lbs) Muay Thai | Muangthai P.K.Saenchai | def. | Mavlud Tupiev | Decision (unanimous) | 3 | 3:00 | (Note: Tupiev missed weight (147 lbs).) |
| Catchweight (177 lbs) Muay Thai | Josh Hill (kickboxer) | def. | Keivan Soleimani | Decision (unanimous) | 3 | 3:00 | (Note: Soleimani missed weight (177 lbs).) |
| Flyweight | Colton Kielbasa | def. | Akihiro Fujisawa | Submission (rear-naked choke) | 1 | 0:57 |
| Flyweight Muay Thai | Muhammed Sadeghi | def. | Angelos Giakoumis | Decision (unanimous) | 3 | 3:00 |

== Bonus awards ==
The following fighters were awarded bonuses.

- Performance of the Night ($50,000): Nong-O Gaiyanghadao and Saeksan Or. Kwanmuang
- Performance of the Night ($10,000): Sakaengam Jitmuangnon and Muangthai P.K.Saenchai

== See also ==
- 2023 in ONE Championship
- List of ONE Championship events
- List of current ONE fighters
