= View Petchkoson =

Thai professional Muay Thai fighter

- Born: Thanaphaiboon Kosol; October 19, 1999 (age 26); Chanthaburi province, Thailand
- Other names: Nongview Petchkosol (น้องวิว เพชรโกศล); Nongview Sor.Plubplanarai (น้องวิว ส.พลับพลานารายณ์)
- Nickname: The Wonder Kid (???)
- Height: 171 cm (5 ft 7 in)
- Weight: 57 kg (126 lb; 9 st 0 lb)
- Division: Featherweight
- Style: Muay Thai (Muay Femur)
- Stance: Orthodox
- Fighting out of: Bangkok, Thailand
- Team: Kiatpetch Boxing Training Camp (2021-Present); Petchkoson Sathian Gym

Thanaphaiboon Kosol (born October 19, 1999), known professionally as View Petchkoson (Thai: วิว เพชรโกศล), is a Thai professional Muay Thai fighter and amateur boxer.

== Career ==
On April 3, 2018, Nongview defeated Chatchai P. K. Saenchaimuaythaigym by decision at the Lumpinee Stadium.

On August 7, 2018, View defeated Worawut BaoweeyGym by decision at the Lumpinee Stadium.

On October 2, 2018 View lost by decision to Messi Pangkongprab at the Lumpinee Stadium.

On April 9, 2019 View defeated Saknarinnoi Or.Unsuwan at the Lumpinee Stadium.

On June 29, 2019 View defeated Phet Sawansrangmunja by decision at the Lumpinee Stadium.

On July 30, 2019 View knocked out Pomphet Sitnumnoi in the second round at the Lumpinee Stadium.

On January 1, 2020, View challenged Klasuk Phetjinda for his Channel 7 Stadium 126 lbs title. He won the fight by decision.

On March 6, 2020, View faced Chalam Parunchai for the vacant Lumpinee Stadium 126 lbs title. He lost by decision

On September 13, 2020, View rematched Chalam Parunchai at the Channel 7 Stadium. He once again was defeated by decision. Following this loss View stopped training for 5 months due to covid restrictions and his studies in college. ↵ was invited by his promotor Chun Kiatpetch to join his camp for better training conditions.

For his first fight after joining the Kiatpetch training camp View defeated Dieselnoi Sor Damnoen by decision on March 21, 2021 at the Channel 7 Stadium.

View participated to the 2021 Thailand amateur boxing championship in August and won the gold medal in the Featherweight division. He joined the national training team with the ambition of qualifying for the 2024 Olympics. On September 28, 2021 View defeated Kompetch Sitsarawatsuer by decision at a Charity Event for Muay Thai in Chonburi.

View was scheduled to make the first defense of his Channel 7 Stadium 126 lbs title against Kompetch Sitsarawatsuer on May 22, 2022. He won the fight by decision. As of June 2022, he was the #1 ranked 126 lbs Muay Thai fighter in the world by the WMO.

View faced the reigning K-1 Featherweight champion Taito Gunji at K-1 World GP 2023: K'Festa 6 on March 12, 2023. He lost the fight by majority decision.

View successfully defended his Channel 7 Stadium title against Comeback TK.Yuttana on May 21, 2023, defeating him by decision.

== Titles and accomplishments ==
=== Muay Thai ===
- Siam Omnoi Stadium
  - 2016 Omnoi Stadium Super Flyweight (115 lbs) Champion
- Professional Boxing Association of Thailand (PAT)
  - 2016 Thailand Super Flyweight (115 lbs) Champion
- Channel 7 Stadium
  - 2020 Channel 7 Stadium Featherweight (126 lbs) Champion (2 defenses)

=== Amateur boxing ===
- 2x Thailand National Championship Featherweight (gold) (2021, 2022)

== Fight record ==
Muay Thai Record
Date	Result	Opponent	Event	Location	Method	Round	Time
2025-07-27	Loss	(Thailand) Ronachai Tor.Ramintra	Kiatpetch, Channel 7 Stadium	Bangkok, Thailand	Decision (Unanimous)	5	3:00
Loses the Channel 7 Stadium Featherweight (126 lbs) title.
2025-04-12	Loss	(Thailand) Ronachai Tor.Ramintra	Rajadamnern World Series	Bangkok, Thailand	Decision (Unanimous)	3	3:00
2025-02-15	Win	(Thailand) Arrow RisingMuaythai	Rajadamnern World Series	Bangkok, Thailand	Decision (Unanimous)	3	3:00
2024-11-02	Loss	(Israel) Ruach Gordon	Rajadamnern World Series - Final 4	Bangkok, Thailand	Decision (Unanimous)	3	3:00
2024-09-21	Win	(Thailand) Yodkhunsuek Mor.Ratchapatjombung	Rajadamnern World Series - Group Stage	Bangkok, Thailand	Decision (Unanimous)	3	3:00
2024-08-17	Win	(Thailand) Surasak KrudamGym	Rajadamnern World Series - Group Stage	Bangkok, Thailand	Decision (Unanimous)	3	3:00
2024-07-06	Win	(Thailand) Chaila Por.Lakboon	Rajadamnern World Series - Group Stage	Bangkok, Thailand	Decision (Unanimous)	3	3:00
2024-02-10	Loss	(Thailand) Chaila Por.Lakboon	Rajadamnern World Series	Bangkok, Thailand	Decision (Split)	5	3:00
For the Rajadamnern Stadium Featherweight (126 lbs) title.
2023-12-27	Win	(Thailand) Yothin FA Group	Rajadamnern Stadium 78th Birthday Show	Bangkok, Thailand	Decision (Unanimous)	5	3:00
2023-11-17	Win	(Russia) Aslanbek Zikreev	ONE Friday Fights 41, Lumpinee Stadium	Bangkok, Thailand	Decision (Unanimous)	3	3:00
2023-09-28	Draw	(Thailand) Chaila Por.Lakboon	Wan Ittipon Mahasakun, Rajadamnern Stadium	Bangkok, Thailand	Decision	5	3:00
2023-07-17	Loss	(Japan) Toma	K-1 World GP 2023	Tokyo, Japan	TKO (Ref.stop/punches)	3	2:52
2023-05-21	Win	(Thailand) Comeback TK.Yuttana	Kiatpetch, Channel 7 Stadium	Bangkok, Thailand	Decision	5	3:00
Defends the Channel 7 Stadium Featherweight (126 lbs) title.
2023-03-12	Loss	(Japan) Taito Gunji	K-1 World GP 2023: K'Festa 6	Tokyo, Japan	Decision (Majority)	3	3:00
For the K-1 Featherweight (126 lbs) title.
2022-11-13	Loss	(Thailand) Ronachai Tor.Ramintra	Amarin Super Fight, Rajadamnern Stadium	Bangkok, Thailand	Decision	5	3:00
2022-10-08	Win	(Thailand) Kompetch Sitsarawatsuer	TorNamThai TKO Kiatpetch + Muay Thai Kiatpetch, World Siam Stadium	Bangkok, Thailand	Decision	5	3:00
2022-08-13	Loss	(Thailand) Kompetch Sitsarawatsuer	Ruamponkon Samui, Petchbuncha Stadium	Ko Samui, Thailand	Decision	5	3:00
2022-07-03	Win	(Thailand) Magnum Kiatchatchanan	Kiatpetch, Channel 7 Stadium	Bangkok, Thailand	Decision	5	3:00
2022-05-22	Win	(Thailand) Kompetch Sitsarawatsuer	Kiatpetch, Channel 7 Stadium	Bangkok, Thailand	Decision	5	3:00
Defends the Channel 7 Stadium Featherweight (126 lbs) title.
2021-09-28	Win	(Thailand) Kompetch Sitsarawatsuer	VAR Muay Charity Event for Muay Thai, Fonjangchonburi Stadium	Chonburi, Thailand	Decision	5	3:00
2021-03-21	Win	(Thailand) Dieselnoi Sor Damnoen	Kiatpetch, Channel 7 Stadium	Bangkok, Thailand	Decision	5	3:00
2020-09-13	Loss	(Thailand) Chalam Parunchai	Kiatpetch, Channel 7 Stadium	Bangkok, Thailand	Decision	5	3:00
2020-07-26	Win	(Thailand) Kompatak SinbiMuayThai	Channel 7 Stadium	Bangkok, Thailand	Decision	5	3:00
2020-03-06	Loss	(Thailand) Chalam Parunchai	Lumpinee Champion Kiatpetch, Lumpinee Stadium	Bangkok, Thailand	Decision	5	3:00
For the vacant Lumpinee Stadium Featherweight (126 lbs) title.
2020-01-26	Win	(Thailand) Klasuk Phetjinda	Channel 7 Stadium	Bangkok, Thailand	Decision (Unanimous)	5	3:00
Wins the Channel 7 Stadium Featherweight (126 lbs) title.
2019-11-07	Win	(Thailand) Phetrung Sitnayokpaedriew		Thailand	Decision	5	3:00
2019-10-08	Win	(Thailand) Kongsuk Sitsarawatsuer	Lumpinee Stadium	Bangkok, Thailand	Decision	5	3:00
2019-07-30	Win	(Thailand) Pomphet Sitnumnoi	Phat Phat + PK. Saenchai, Lumpinee Stadium	Bangkok, Thailand	KO (Right hook)	2	
2019-06-29	Win	(Thailand) Phet Sawansrangmunja	PK.Saenchai, Lumpinee Stadium	Bangkok, Thailand	Decision	5	3:00
2019-05-19	Win	(Thailand) Fahpenueng Por.Lakboon	Channel 7 Stadium	Bangkok, Thailand	Decision	5	3:00
2019-04-09	Win	(Thailand) Saknarinnoi Or.Unsuwan	Kiatpetch, Lumpinee Stadium	Bangkok, Thailand	Decision	5	3:00
2019-02-12	Loss	(Thailand) Kongsuk Sitsarawatsuer	Lumpinee Stadium	Bangkok, Thailand	Decision	5	3:00
2019-01-06	Win	(Thailand) Khunsuknnoi Sitkaewpraphon	Kiatpetch, Jitmuangnon Stadium	Nonthaburi province, Thailand	Decision	5	3:00
2018-11-09	Loss	(Thailand) Fahpenueng Por.Lakboon	Kiatpetch, Lumpinee Stadium	Bangkok, Thailand	Decision	5	3:00
2018-10-02	Loss	(Thailand) Messi Pangkongprab	Kiatpetch, Lumpinee Stadium	Bangkok, Thailand	Decision	5	3:00
2018-09-07	Loss	(Thailand) Worawut BaoweeyGym	Kiatpetch, Lumpinee Stadium	Bangkok, Thailand	Decision	5	3:00
2018-08-07	Win	(Thailand) Worawut BaoweeyGym	Kiatpetch, Lumpinee Stadium	Bangkok, Thailand	Decision	5	3:00
2018-07-10	Win	(Thailand) Messi Pangkongprab	P.K. Saenchai, Lumpinee Stadium	Bangkok, Thailand	Decision	5	3:00
2018-04-03	Win	(Thailand) Chatchai P.K. Saenchaimuaythaigym	Kiatpetch, Lumpinee Stadium	Bangkok, Thailand	Decision	5	3:00
2018-03-06	Win	(Thailand) Saknarinnoi Or.Unsuwan	Kiatpetch, Lumpinee Stadium	Bangkok, Thailand	Decision	5	3:00
2018-01-23	Win	(Thailand) Pomphet Sor.Jor.Tongprachin		Thailand	Decision	5	3:00
2017-12-08	Loss	(Thailand) Chaila Por.Lakboon	Lumpinee Champion Krikkrai, Lumpinee Stadium	Bangkok, Thailand	Decision	5	3:00
2017-09-30	Win	(Thailand) Pomphet Sitnumnoi	Muay Thai Lumpinee Super Fight, Lumpinee Stadium	Bangkok, Thailand	Decision	5	3:00
2017-08-29	Win	(Thailand) Pomphet Sitnumnoi	Petchnumnoi, Lumpinee Stadium	Bangkok, Thailand	Decision	5	3:00
2017-07-18	Win	(Thailand) Watcharapon P.K. Saenchaimuaythaigym	Petchnumnoi, Lumpinee Stadium	Bangkok, Thailand	Decision	5	3:00
2017-06-13	Loss	(Thailand) Saknarinnoi Or.Unsuwan	Eminentair, Lumpinee Stadium	Bangkok, Thailand	Decision	5	3:00
2017-05-05	Loss	(Thailand) Pomphet Sitnumnoi	P.K.Saenchai, Lumpinee Stadium	Bangkok, Thailand	Decision	5	3:00
2017-04-01	Win	(Thailand) Boonchana Nayokthasala		Thailand	Decision	5	3:00
2017-03-03	Win	(Thailand) Kangkawdaeng Huarongnamkeng	Phetkiatpetch, Lumpinee Stadium	Bangkok, Thailand	Decision	5	3:00
2016-12-09	Win	(Thailand) Boonchana Nayokthasala	Lumpinee Krikkrai, Lumpinee Stadium	Bangkok, Thailand	Decision	5	3:00
Wins the Thailand Super Flyweight (115 lbs) title.
2016-09-25	Loss	(Thailand) Boonpha Wor.Wangprom	Channel 7 Stadium	Bangkok, Thailand	Decision	5	3:00
2016-08-16	Loss	(Thailand) Boonpha Wor.Wangprom	Jitmuangnon, Rajadamnern Stadium	Bangkok, Thailand	Decision	5	3:00
2016-07-02	Win	(Thailand) Kangkawdaeng Huarongnamkeng	Siam Omnoi Stadium	Samut Sakhon, Thailand	Decision	5	3:00
Wins the Omnoi Stadium Super Flyweight (115 lbs) title.
2016-05-28	Win	(Thailand) Numnoi Sitjemiao	Lumpinee Stadium	Bangkok, Thailand	Decision	5	3:00
2016-05-03	Win	(Thailand) Tawanchai P.K. Saenchaimuaythaigym	Kiatpetch, Lumpinee Stadium	Bangkok, Thailand	Decision	5	3:00
2016-03-29	Loss	(Thailand) Pomphet Sitnumnoi	Kiatpetch, Lumpinee Stadium	Bangkok, Thailand	Decision	5	3:00
2016-03-05	Win	(Thailand) Numnoi Sitjemiao	Lumpinee Stadium	Bangkok, Thailand	Decision	5	3:00
2016-01-24	Win	(Thailand) Pomphet Sitnumnoi	Phetkiatpetch, Lumpinee Stadium	Bangkok, Thailand	Decision	5	3:00
Legend: Win Loss Draw/No contest Notes
