= Chaila Por.Lakboon =

Thai Muay Thai fighter

- Born: June 24, 1997 (age 29); Loei, Thailand
- Other names: Chailar Teemuangloei (ชายหลัา ตี๋เมืองเลย)
- Nickname: The Isan Ghost (ผีตาโขน)
- Height: 166 cm (5 ft 5 in)
- Division: Bantamweight; Super Bantamweight; Featherweight; Super Featherweight
- Reach: 164 cm (65 in)
- Style: Muay Thai (Muay Femur)
- Stance: Southpaw
- Fighting out of: Bangkok, Thailand
- Team: P.K.Saenchai Muaythai Gym; Por.Lakboon Gym

Kickboxing record
- Total: 80
- Wins: 64
- Losses: 15
- Draws: 1

Other information
- Occupation: Police officer

Chaila Por.Lakboon (Thai: ชายหลัา ภ.หลักบุญ) is a Thai professional Muay Thai fighter. He is a former Rajadamnern Stadium Featherweight Champion.

== Career ==
On May 28, 2017, Chaila faced Detrit Sor.Penrapha at the Channel 7 stadium. He was knocked out in the third round from a right cross that left him slumped in the corner. Chaila lost his next fight by decision on July 15, 2017, against Phetniran Dabransarakam on a Kiatpetch promotion event at the Lumpinee Stadium. Chaila renewed with victory on August 19, 2017, when he defeated Phetmueangphrae AyongGym by decision at the Lumpinee Stadium.

On December 8, 2017, Chaila defeated View Petchkoson by decision at the Lumpinee stadium.

On February 11, 2018, Chaila defeated Satanfah EminentAir by decision at the Channel 7 stadium.

On February 3, 2019, Chaila faced Yardfah R Airlines at the Channel 7 Stadium. He won the fight by decision.

Chaila faced Kongsuk Sitsarawatsuer at the Channel 7 Stadium on May 26, 2019. He won the fight by unanimous decision.

On June 29, 2019, Chaila lost to Fahmai Sor.Sommai by decision on a P.K.Saenchai promotion event at Lumpinee Stadium.

On November 3, 2019, Chaila lost by decision to Worawut BaoweeGym at the Channel 7 Stadium.

On February 11, 2020, Chaila defeated Ronachai Tor.Ramintra at the Lumpinee stadium. He then defeated Petchsamarn Sor.Samarngarment on March 6, before losing by decision a rematch against Ronachai Tor.Ramintra on August 30, 2020, at the Channel 7 stadium.

Chail left the ring for a year between 2020 and 2021 due to the COVID-19 pandemic. During this time he became a police officer.

On November 20, 2021, Chaila vied for the vacant Thailand 126 lbs title at the Omnoi stadium. He lost the fight by decision.

On February 21, 2023, Chaila faced Somraknoi Muayded789 for the vacant True4U 126 lbs title on a Muaymansananmuang promoted event at the Rangsit Stadium. He won the fight by decision.

On April 6, 2023, Chaila faced Narak SorJor.Tongprachin for the vacant Rajadamnern Stadium 126 lbs title on a Petchyindee promotion event. He won the fight by decision and captured the title.

Chaila was scheduled to rematch on May 25, 2023, for the Petchyindee promotion at Rajadamnern stadium. He beat the odds and defeated Yothin by unanimous decision after scoring a knockdown with an elbow strike. As of June 2023 Chaila was ranked as the second best 126 lbs Muay Thai fighter in the world by the WMO and as the fifth best by Combat Press.

== Titles and accomplishments ==
- Rajadamnern Stadium
  - 2023 Rajadamnern Stadium Featherweight (126 lbs) Champion
    - One successful title defense
  - 2024 Rajadamnern World Series Featherweight (126 lbs) Tournament Winner
  - 2026 Rajadamnern Stadium Super Featherweight (130 lbs) Champion
- Petchyindee True4U/PRYDE TV
  - 2023 True4U Featherweight (126 lbs) Champion
  - 2025 PRYDE TV Super Featherweight (130 lbs) Champion

== Fight record ==
Muay Thai Record
Date	Result	Opponent	Event	Location	Method	Round	Time
2026-11-07	Win	(Thailand) Wukong Sor.Prembut	Rajadamnern World Series	Bangkok, Thailand	KO (High kick)	3	
Wins the vacant Rajadamnern Stadium Super Featherweight (130 lbs) title.
2026-07-23	Win	(Thailand) Yodtong KiatNavy	Petchyindee, Rajadamnern Stadium	Bangkok, Thailand	KO	2	
2026-03-10	Loss	(Thailand) Wukong Sor.Prembut	Muaymansananmuang, M Arena	Patong, Thailand	Decision	5	3:00
Loses the PRYDE TV Super Featherweight (130 lbs) title.
2025-12-02	Win	(Australia) Josh McCulloch	Amazing MuayThai Fight Night 2	Bangkok, Thailand	Decision (Unanimous)	5	3:00
For the WBC Muay Thai World Super Featherweight (130 lbs) title.
2025-08-14	Win	(Thailand) Yodtong KiatNavy	Petchyindee, Rajadamnern Stadium	Bangkok, Thailand	Decision (Unanimous)	5	3:00
Wins the PRYDE TV Super Featherweight (130 lbs) title.
2025-05-10	Loss	(Thailand) Yothin FA Group	Rajadamnern World Series	Bangkok, Thailand	Decision (Unanimous)	5	3:00
For the Rajadamnern Stadium Featherweight (126 lbs) title.
2024-12-14	Win	(Israel) Ruach Gordon	Rajadamnern World Series - Final	Bangkok, Thailand	Decision (Unanimous)	5	3:00
Wins the 2024 Rajadamnern World Series Featherweight (126 lbs) title.
2024-11-02	Win	(Thailand) Ronachai Tor.Ramintra	Rajadamnern World Series - Final 4	Bangkok, Thailand	Decision (Split)	3	3:00
2024-09-21	Win	(Thailand) Surasak KrudamGym	Rajadamnern World Series - Group Stage	Bangkok, Thailand	Decision (Unanimous)	3	3:00
2024-08-17	Win	(Thailand) Yodkhunsuek Mor.Ratchapatjombung	Rajadamnern World Series - Group Stage	Bangkok, Thailand	Decision (Unanimous)	3	3:00
2024-07-06	Loss	(Thailand) View Petchkoson	Rajadamnern World Series - Group Stage	Bangkok, Thailand	Decision (Unanimous)	3	3:00
2024-04-27	Loss	(Thailand) Yothin FA Group	Rajadamnern World Series	Bangkok, Thailand	Decision (Split)	5	3:00
Loses the Rajadamnern Stadium 126 lbs title.
2024-02-10	Win	(Thailand) View Petchkoson	Rajadamnern World Series	Bangkok, Thailand	Decision (Split)	5	3:00
Defends the Rajadamnern Stadium 126 lbs title.
2023-12-27	Loss	(Thailand) Comeback T.K.Yuttana	Rajadamnern Stadium 78th Birthday Show	Bangkok, Thailand	KO (High kick)	2	
2023-09-28	Draw	(Thailand) View Petchkoson	Wan Ittipon Mahasakun, Rajadamnern Stadium	Bangkok, Thailand	Decision	5	3:00
2023-08-09	Win	(Thailand) Focus Adsanpatong	Rajadamnern Ruamjai Puan Faen Muay, Rajadamnern Stadium	Bangkok, Thailand	Decision	5	3:00
2023-05-25	Win	(Thailand) Yothin FA Group	Petchyindee, Rajadamnern Stadium	Bangkok, Thailand	Decision	5	3:00
2023-04-05	Win	(Thailand) Narak SorJor.TongPrachin	Petchyindee, Rajadamnern Stadium	Bangkok, Thailand	Decision	5	3:00
Wins the vacant Rajadamnern Stadium 126 lbs title.
2023-02-21	Win	(Thailand) Somraknoi Muayded789	Muaymansananmuang, Rangsit Stadium	Pathum Thani, Thailand	Decision	5	3:00
Wins the vacant True4U Featherweight (126 lbs) title.
2022-10-01	Win	(Thailand) TomYamGoong SorSor.Pakorn	Muay Thai Vithee TinThai + Kiatpetch	Buriram province, Thailand	Decision	5	3:00
2022-06-05	Win	(Thailand) Petchrung SitNayokGaiPadriew	Channel 7 Stadium	Bangkok, Thailand	TKO (Punches)	1	
2022-05-01	Loss	(Thailand) Petchrungruang SorJor.TongPrachin	Kiatpetch Amarin SUper Fight, Rajadamnern Stadium	Bangkok, Thailand	Decision	5	3:00
2021-11-20	Loss	(Thailand) Yothin FA Group	Suk Jao Muay Thai, Siam Omnoi Stadium	Samut Sakhon, Thailand	Decision	5	3:00
For the vacant Thailand Featherweight (126 lbs) title.
2021-10-07	Win	(Thailand) Surachai SitNayoksanya		Lampang province, Thailand	Decision	5	3:00
2020-08-30	Loss	(Thailand) Ronachai Tor.Ramintra	MuayThai 7see, Channel 7 Stadium	Bangkok, Thailand	Decision	5	3:00
2020-03-06	Win	(Thailand) Petchsamarn Sor.Samarngarment	Kiatpetch, Lumpinee Stadium	Bangkok, Thailand	Decision	5	3:00
2020-02-11	Win	(Thailand) Ronachai Tor.Ramintra	P.K.Saenchai, Lumpinee Stadium	Bangkok, Thailand	Decision	5	3:00
2019-12-23	Win	(Thailand) Thepthaksin Sor.Sornsing	Chef Boontham, Rajadamnern Stadium	Bangkok, Thailand	Decision	5	3:00
2019-11-03	Loss	(Thailand) Worawut BaoweeGym	MuayThai 7see, Channel 7 Stadium	Bangkok, Thailand	Decision	5	3:00
2019-08-04	Loss	(Thailand) Petchrung SitNayokGaiPadriew	MuayThai 7see, Channel 7 Stadium	Bangkok, Thailand	Decision	5	3:00
2019-05-26	Win	(Thailand) Kongsuk Sitsarawatsuer	MuayThai 7see, Channel 7 Boxing Stadium	Bangkok, Thailand	Decision	5	3:00
2019-02-03	Win	(Thailand) Yardfah R Airlines	MuayThai 7see, Channel 7 Boxing Stadium	Bangkok, Thailand	Decision	5	3:00
2018-12-11	Loss	(Thailand) Worawut BaoweeGym	P.K.Saenchai, Lumpinee Stadium	Bangkok, Thailand	Decision	5	3:00
2018-10-02	Win	(Thailand) Sprinter Pangkongprab	Kiatpetch, Lumpinee Stadium	Bangkok, Thailand	Decision	5	3:00
2018-08-19	Win	(Thailand) Nuengpichit Petchphachara Academy	Kiatpetch, Jitmuangnon Stadium	Bangkok, Thailand	KO (Body kick)	3	
2018-06-29	Loss	(Thailand) Fahmai Sor.Sommai	P.K.Saenchai, Lumpinee Stadium	Bangkok, Thailand	Decision	5	3:00
2018-05-15	Loss	(Thailand) Yardfah R Airlines	P.K.Saenchai, Lumpinee Stadium	Bangkok, Thailand	Decision	5	3:00
2018-02-11	Win	(Thailand) Satanfah EminentAir	MuayThai 7see, Channel 7 Boxing Stadium	Bangkok, Thailand	Decision	5	3:00
2017-12-08	Win	(Thailand) View Petchkoson	Lumpinee Champion Krikkrai, Lumpinee Stadium	Bangkok, Thailand	Decision	5	3:00
2017-10-08	Win	(Thailand) Phetpusang Kilasport	MuayThai 7see, Channel 7 Boxing Stadium	Bangkok, Thailand	Decision	5	3:00
2017-08-19	Win	(Thailand) Phetmueangphrae AyongGym	Kiatpetch, Lumpinee Stadium	Bangkok, Thailand	Decision	5	3:00
2017-07-15	Loss	(Thailand) Phetniran Dabransarakam	Kiatpetch, Lumpinee Stadium	Bangkok, Thailand	Decision	5	3:00
2017-05-28	Loss	(Thailand) Detrit Sor.Penprapha	MuayThai 7see, Channel 7 Boxing Stadium	Bangkok, Thailand	KO (Right cross)	3	
2017-03-12	Win	(Thailand) Wuttichai Kiatchamrunarit	MuayThai 7see, Channel 7 Boxing Stadium	Bangkok, Thailand	TKO	5	
2016-09-28	Win	(Thailand) Wanmeechok Phuhongthong	Jitmuangnon, Rajadamnern Stadium	Bangkok, Thailand	Ref stop (Wanmeechok dismissed)	5	
2016-08-28	Loss	(Thailand) Boonchana Nayok-A-Thasala	MuayThai 7see, Channel 7 Boxing Stadium	Bangkok, Thailand	Decision	5	3:00
2016-07-17	Loss	(Thailand) Tawanchai P.K. Saenchaimuaythaigym	Channel 7 Boxing Stadium	Bangkok, Thailand	KO	4	
2016-06-21	Win	(Thailand) Pomphet Sitnumnoi	Phetkiatpetch, Lumpinee Stadium	Bangkok, Thailand	Decision	5	3:00
2016-05-31	Win	(Thailand) Wanmeechok Phuhongthong	Phetkiatpetch, Lumpinee Stadium	Bangkok, Thailand	Decision	5	3:00
2016-04-29	Win	(Thailand) Prajanban Wichipaedriew	Paderiew, Lumpinee Stadium	Bangkok, Thailand	Decision	5	3:00
2016-04-03	Win	(Thailand) Nongbeer Sor.WichitPaedRiew	MuayDeeWithithai, Rangsit Stadium	Pathum Thani, Thailand	Decision	5	3:00
2016-03-01	Loss	(Thailand) Phetsamila Kiatcharoenchai	Phumpanmuang, Lumpinee Stadium	Bangkok, Thailand	Decision	5	3:00
2016-01-17	Win	(Thailand) Nongdom Chayutkongsub	MuayDeeWithithai, Rangsit Stadium	Pathum Thani, Thailand	Decision	5	3:00
2015-12-22	Win	(Thailand) Numnoi SitJaemiao	Kiatpetch, Lumpinee Stadium	Bangkok, Thailand	Decision	5	3:00
2015-10-05	Win	(Thailand) Phetkhaowang Aesaphansung	Jitmuangnon, Rajadamnern Stadium	Bangkok, Thailand	Decision	5	3:00
2015-09-14	Loss	(Thailand) Singtongnoi Kiatkittipun	Jitmuangnon, Rajadamnern Stadium	Bangkok, Thailand	Decision	5	3:00
2015-05-08	Win	(Thailand) Dabthong Chor.Chanathip	Kiatpetch, Lumpinee Stadium	Bangkok, Thailand	Decision	5	3:00
2015-04-03	Win	(Thailand) Fahkriangkrai Sor.Yaowala	Kiatpetch, Lumpinee Stadium	Bangkok, Thailand	Decision	5	3:00
2015-03-03	Win	(Thailand) Phetnsinin Sathisidi	Kiatpetch, Lumpinee Stadium	Bangkok, Thailand	Decision	5	3:00
2014-12-21	Win	(Thailand) Saenpon Lukbanyai	MuayThai 7see, Channel 7 Boxing Stadium	Bangkok, Thailand	TKO	3	
2014-10-31	Loss	(Thailand) Kiew Parunchai	Kiatpetch, Lumpinee Stadium	Bangkok, Thailand	Decision	5	3:00
2014-09-30	Win	(Thailand) Pinyok NithipatThanaykwam	Kiatpetch, Lumpinee Stadium	Bangkok, Thailand	Decision	5	3:00
2014-09-07	Win	(Thailand) Buriram SasiprapaGym	Muaymansananmuang, Jitmuangnon Stadium	Bangkok, Thailand	Decision	5	3:00
Legend: Win Loss Draw/No contest Notes
