= Kongsuk Sitsarawatsuer =

Thai professional Muay Thai fighter

- Born: Sittichok Kaewsanga; June 22, 2000 (age 26); Nakhon Ratchasima, Thailand
- Native name: ก้องศึก แฟร์เท็กซ์
- Other names: Kongsuk Suanluangrotyok; Kongsuek Wutshipping; Kongsuk Fairtex
- Height: 170 cm (5 ft 7 in)
- Division: Super Flyweight; Bantamweight; Super Bantamweight
- Style: Muay Thai (Muay Femur)
- Stance: Southpaw
- Fighting out of: Bangkok, Thailand
- Team: Fairtex Training Center

Sittichok Kaewsanga (Thai: สิทธิโชค แก้วสง่า; born June 22, 2000), known professionally as Kongsuk Sitsarawatsuer (Thai: ก้องศึก ศิษย์สารวัตรเสือ) is a Thai professional Muay Thai fighter. He is a former two-division Lumpinee Stadium champion, two-division Thailand champion, and one-division Channel 7 Stadium champion.

== Titles and accomplishments ==
- Lumpinee Stadium
  - 2018 Lumpinee Stadium Bantamweight (118 lbs) Champion
  - 2019 Lumpinee Stadium Super Bantamweight (122 lbs) Champion
  - 2018 Lumpinee Stadium Young Fighter of the Year
- Professional Boxing Association of Thailand (PAT)
  - 2017 Thailand Super Flyweight (115 lbs) Champion
  - 2018 Thailand Bantamweight (118 lbs) Champion
- Channel 7 Stadium
  - 2022 Channel 7 Stadium Lightweight (135 lbs) Champion (1 defense)

== Fight record ==
Muay Thai Record
Date	Result	Opponent	Event	Location	Method	Round	Time
2026-10-09	Win	(Russia) Ruslan Tuktarov	ONE The Inner Circle 34, Lumpinee Stadium	Bangkok, Thailand	Decision (Split)	3	3:00
2026-08-21	Win	(Thailand) Dedduanglek Torfunfarm	ONE Friday Fights 167, Lumpinee Stadium	Bangkok, Thailand	Decision (Split)	3	3:00
2026-05-29	Win	(Uzbekistan) Khakimov Anisjon	ONE Friday Fights 156, Lumpinee Stadium	Bangkok, Thailand	TKO (body punches)	3	2:17
2026-03-13	Win	(Iran) Babak Solouki	ONE Friday Fights 146, Lumpinee Stadium	Bangkok, Thailand	TKO (body kick and punches)	3	2:27
2025-11-16	Loss	(Italy) Alessandro Sara	Channel 7 Stadium	Bangkok, Thailand	Decision	5	3:00
2025-06-21	Loss	(Thailand) Cyber Sor.Tienpo	Matuphum: Mother Land of Muay Thai	Sa Kaeo Province, Thailand	Decision	5	3:00
2025-04-18	Loss	(Thailand) Lamnamoonlek Or.Atchariya	ONE Friday Fights 105, Lumpinee Stadium	Bangkok, Thailand	Decision (Unanimous)	3	3:00
2025-02-14	Win	(Thailand) Lamnamoonlek Or.Atchariya	ONE Friday Fights 97, Lumpinee Stadium	Bangkok, Thailand	Decision (Split)	3	3:00
2024-10-25	Loss	(Thailand) Muangthai P.K. Saenchaimuaythaigym	ONE Friday Fights 84, Lumpinee Stadium	Bangkok, Thailand	TKO (Left cross)	3	0:14
2024-08-30	Win	(Thailand) Yodlekpet Or. Pitisak	ONE Friday Fights 77, Lumpinee Stadium	Bangkok, Thailand	Decision (Unanimous)	3	3:00
2024-07-26	Win	(Algeria) Joachim Ouraghi	ONE Friday Fights 72, Lumpinee Stadium	Bangkok, Thailand	Decision (Unanimous)	3	3:00
2024-02-23	Win	(Thailand) Phetsukumvit Boybangna	ONE Friday Fights 53, Lumpinee Stadium	Bangkok, Thailand	Decision (Unanimous)	3	3:00
2023-12-01	Loss	(Thailand) Pettonglor Sitluangpeenumfon	ONE Friday Fights 43, Lumpinee Stadium	Bangkok, Thailand	Decision (Split)	3	3:00
2023-09-29	Loss	(Thailand) Dedduanglek Tded99	ONE Friday Fights 35, Lumpinee Stadium	Bangkok, Thailand	Decision (Unanimous)	3	3:00
2023-08-11	Win	(Thailand) Jawsuayai Sor.Dechaphan	ONE Friday Fights 28, Lumpinee Stadium	Bangkok, Thailand	Decision (Unanimous)	3	3:00
2023-06-16	Win	(Thailand) Paidaeng Kiatsongrit	ONE Friday Fights 21, Lumpinee Stadium	Bangkok, Thailand	Decision (Unanimous)	3	3:00
2023-04-16	Win	(Thailand) Jom Parunchai	Kiatpetch, Channel 7 Stadium	Bangkok, Thailand	Decision	5	3:00
Defends the Channel 7 Stadium Lightweight (135 lbs) title.
2023-02-18	Win	(Turkey) Erdal VenumMuayThai	Rajadamnern World Series	Bangkok, Thailand	TKO (Doctor stoppage)	3	2:28
2022-12-17	Win	(Thailand) Batman Or.Atchariya	Samui Super Fight: Ruamponkon Samui, Phetchbuncha Stadium	Koh Samui, Thailand	Decision	5	3:00
2022-11-06	Win	(Thailand) Batman Or.Atchariya	Kiatpetch, Channel 7 Stadium	Bangkok, Thailand	Decision	5	3:00
Wins the Channel 7 Stadium Lightweight (135 lbs) title.
2022-09-24	Win	(Thailand) Worapon Kiatchachanan	Ruamponkon Samui + Kiatpetch Samui Fight, Petchbuncha Stadium	Koh Samui, Thailand	Decision	5	3:00
2022-09-03	Win	(Thailand) Yok Parunchai	Ruamponkon Samui + Kiatpetch Samui Fight, Petchbuncha Stadium	Koh Samui, Thailand	Decision	5	3:00
2022-07-03	Win	(Thailand) PetchSamui Lukjaoporongtom	Chang MuayThai Kiatpetch Amarin Super Fight, Rajadamnern Stadium	Bangkok, Thailand	Decision	5	3:00
2022-06-11	Win	(Thailand) Darky NokKhao-GorMor.11	Fairtex Fight, Lumpinee Stadium	Bangkok, Thailand	Decision	5	3:00
2022-05-14	Loss	(Thailand) PheuThai Por.Panomporn	TorNamThai TKO Kiatpetch, Sor.Salacheep Stadium	Lopburi province, Thailand	Decision	5	3:00
2022-04-04	Win	(Thailand) Rungnapa Pinsinchai	Suek Muaydee 4 Pak, Thupatemi Stadium	Pathum Thani, Thailand	TKO	5	
2021-11-13	Win	(Thailand) Fahnamchai Por.Mongkolpsap	Go Sport, Lumpinee Stadium	Bangkok, Thailand	Decision	5	3:00
2019-10-08	Loss	(Thailand) View Petchkoson	Lumpinee Stadium	Bangkok, Thailand	Decision	5	3:00
2019-09-06	Loss	(Thailand) Worawut MUden-BawvyJeans	Lumpinee Stadium	Bangkok, Thailand	Decision	5	3:00
2019-05-26	Loss	(Thailand) Chaila Por.Lakboon	Channel 7 Boxing Stadium	Bangkok, Thailand	Decision	5	3:00
2019-03-19	Win	(Thailand) Worawut Boveejean	Lumpinee Stadium	Bangkok, Thailand	Decision	5	3:00
Wins the Lumpinee Stadium Super Bantamweight (122 lbs) title.
2019-02-12	Win	(Thailand) View Petchkoson	Lumpinee Stadium	Bangkok, Thailand	Decision	5	3:00
2018-12-07	Win	(Thailand) Jakdao Wissanukollakan	Lumpinee Stadium	Bangkok, Thailand	Decision	5	3:00
Wins the Lumpinee Stadium Bantamweight (118 lbs) title.
2018-11-13	Win	(Thailand) Wanmechok Sitnayoktaweepong	Lumpinee Stadium	Bangkok, Thailand	Decision	5	3:00
2018-09-25	Win	(Thailand) Pompetch Sitnumnoi	Lumpinee Stadium	Bangkok, Thailand	Decision	5	3:00
Wins the 1 million baht side-bet.
2018-09-04	Win	(Thailand) Peemai Erawan	Lumpinee Stadium	Bangkok, Thailand	Decision	5	3:00
Wins the Thailand Bantamweight (118 lbs) title.
2018-06-05	Win	(Thailand) Banlangngoen Sawansrangmunja	Lumpinee Stadium	Bangkok, Thailand	Decision	5	3:00
2018-04-03	Win	(Thailand) Phetsaitong Sor.Jor.Lekmuangnon	Lumpinee Stadium	Bangkok, Thailand	KO	2	
2018-03-06	Win	(Thailand) Boonchana Nayokatasala	Lumpinee Stadium	Bangkok, Thailand	Decision	5	3:00
Wins the Thailand Super Flyweight (115 lbs) title.
2018-02-06	Win	(Thailand) Donkings Morbestkamala	Lumpinee Stadium	Bangkok, Thailand	Decision	5	3:00
2017-12-01	Loss	(Thailand) Phetnarin Sitnumnoi	Lumpinee Stadium	Bangkok, Thailand	Decision	5	3:00
2017-11-10	Win	(Thailand) Ekkachai Sor.Jor.Lekmuangnon	Lumpinee Stadium	Bangkok, Thailand	Decision	5	3:00
2017-08-15	Win	(Thailand) Chokprecha Sitnayokthaweb	Lumpinee Stadium	Bangkok, Thailand	Decision	5	3:00
2017-07-18	Win	(Thailand) Sensak Sor.Boongium	Lumpinee Stadium	Bangkok, Thailand	Decision	5	3:00
2017-06-20	Win	(Thailand) Patakphet Sinbeemuaythai	Lumpinee Stadium	Bangkok, Thailand	Decision	5	3:00
2017-05-21	Win	(Thailand) Dechkhonchon Pangkongprab	Channel 7 Boxing Stadium	Bangkok, Thailand	Decision	5	3:00
2017-03-21	Win	(Thailand) Donkings Morbestkamala	Lumpinee Stadium	Bangkok, Thailand	Decision	5	3:00
2017-02-19	Win	(Thailand) Brandthai Kelasport		Nonthaburi, Thailand	Decision	5	3:00
2017-01-15	Loss	(Thailand) Sangdaw Erawan		Thailand	KO	4	
2016-12-16	Win	(Thailand) Brandthai Kelasport	Lumpinee Stadium	Bangkok, Thailand	Decision	5	3:00
2016-09-25	Win	(Thailand) Chalawan Sor.Thanaphet	Channel 7 Boxing Stadium	Bangkok, Thailand	Decision	5	3:00
2016-07-23	Win	(Thailand) Wisanuchai Jitmuangnon	Lumpinee Stadium	Bangkok, Thailand	Decision	5	3:00
2016-04-05	Loss	(Thailand) Tongpoon Sitpanancherng	Siam Boxing Omnoi	Bangkok, Thailand	KO	4	
2016-03-15	Win	(Thailand) Panphetlek Kiatjaroenchai	Lumpinee Stadium	Bangkok, Thailand	Decision	5	3:00
2016-02-05	Win	(Thailand) Petchbangsaen Sor.Jor.Lekmueangnon	Lumpinee Stadium	Bangkok, Thailand	Decision	5	3:00
2015-08-25	Loss	(Thailand) Phetsaifon Erawan	Lumpinee Stadium	Bangkok, Thailand	Decision	5	3:00
2015-07-07	Loss	(Thailand) Dao Parunchai	Lumpinee Stadium	Bangkok, Thailand	Decision	5	3:00
2015-06-12	Win	(Thailand) Suddankrai Phetjinda	Lumpinee Stadium	Bangkok, Thailand	Decision	5	3:00
Legend: Win Loss Draw/No contest Notes
