= Kompetch Sitsarawatsuer =

Thai Muay Thai fighter

- Born: Aphan Phonphonsri; April 7, 2000 (age 26); Nakhon Ratchasima, Thailand
- Other names: Komphet Or.Atchariya; Kompetch ChotBangsaen; Komphet Sor Yingchareonkarnchang (คมเพชร ส.ยิ่งเจริญการช่าง); Kompetch Fairtex
- Height: 165 cm (5 ft 5 in)
- Weight: 57 kg (126 lb; 9.0 st)
- Style: Muay Fimeu
- Stance: Orthodox
- Fighting out of: Bangkok, Thailand
- Team: Fairtex (2023–present); Sitsarawatser (2015–2023)

Kickboxing record
- Total: 124
- Wins: 94
- By knockout: 13
- Losses: 26
- Draws: 4

Kompetch Sitsarawatsuer (คมเพชร ศิษย์สารวัตรเสือ) is a Thai professional Muay Thai fighter.

== Titles and accomplishments ==
- Lumpinee Stadium
  - 2017 Lumpinee Stadium Young Fighter of the Year
  - 2018 Lumpinee Stadium 112 lbs Champion
  - 2019 Lumpinee Stadium 118 lbs Champion
- Professional Boxing Association of Thailand (PAT)
  - 2017 Thailand 108 lbs Champion
- Channel 7 Boxing Stadium
  - 2017 Channel 7 Stadium 108 lbs Champion
  - 2018 Channel 7 Stadium 112 lbs Champion
  - 2021 Channel 7 Stadium 126 lbs Champion

Awards

- 2018 Sports Authority of Thailand Young Fighter of the Year

== Fight record ==
Fight Record
94 Wins (13 (T)KOs), 26 Losses, 5 Draws
Date	Result	Opponent	Event	Location	Method	Round	Time
2026-11-22		(Thailand) TamnanThai PK.LekFirstHouse	TorNamThai Kiatpetch TKO + Deer Kiatpetch Birthday, Rajadamnern Stadium	Bangkok, Thailand			
2026-10-08	Win	(Thailand) Diesellek PetchyindeeAcademy	Petchyindee, Rajadamnern Stadium	Bangkok, Thailand	Decision	5	3:00
2026-09-13	Win	(Thailand) Kohtao GolitaMuayThai	Channel 7 Stadium	Bangkok, Thailand	Decision	5	3:00
2026-07-05	Win	(Thailand) Kongtoranee SantiUbon	Channel 7 Stadium	Bangkok, Thailand	Decision	5	3:00
2026-04-10	Loss	(Thailand) Attachai Kelasport	ONE Friday Fights 150, Lumpinee Stadium	Bangkok, Thailand	Decision (Unanimous)	3	3:00
2026-02-28	Loss	(Thailand) Petchsiam Jor.Pattreya	Muay Thai Witee Tin Thai	Buriram province, Thailand	Decision	5	3:00
2026-02-03	Loss	(Thailand) Dokmaipa SantiUbon	Muay Thai Moradok Chat Muang Phayao Suek Nong Leng Sai Super Fight	Phayao province, Thailand	Decision	5	3:00
2026-01-02	Draw	(Thailand) Peemai Erawan	Ruamponkonrak Khlong Khian + Kiatpetch Sanjorn	Uthai Thani province, Thailand	Decision	5	3:00
2025-11-07	Loss	(Lebanon) Abdallah Ondash	ONE Friday Fights 132, Lumpinee Stadium	Bangkok, Thailand	KO (Left hook)	3	0:25
2025-09-07	Win	(Thailand) Dokmaipa SantiUbon	Channel 7 Stadium	Bangkok, Thailand	Decision	5	3:00
2025-08-03	Loss	(Thailand) Petchsamarn Sor.Samarngarment	Channel 7 Stadium	Bangkok, Thailand	Decision	5	3:00
2025-06-27	Win	(Thailand) Kongchai Chanaidonmuang	ONE Friday Fights 114, Lumpinee Stadium	Bangkok, Thailand	Decision (Unanimous)	3	3:00
2025-04-11	Loss	(Thailand) Chartpayak Saksatun	ONE Friday Fights 104, Lumpinee Stadium	Bangkok, Thailand	KO (Punches)	2	0:51
2025-02-14	Win	(Thailand) Theptaksin Sor.Sornsing	ONE Friday Fights 97, Lumpinee Stadium	Bangkok, Thailand	Decision (Unanimous)	3	3:00
2024-11-08	Loss	(Thailand) Chartpayak Saksatun	ONE Friday Fights 86, Lumpinee Stadium	Bangkok, Thailand	Decision (Majority)	3	3:00
2024-08-16	Win	(Lebanon) Omar El Halabi	ONE Friday Fights 75, Lumpinee Stadium	Bangkok, Thailand	Decision (Unanimous)	3	3:00
2024-04-05	Win	(Thailand) Kongchai Chanaidonmuang	ONE Friday Fights 58, Lumpinee Stadium	Bangkok, Thailand	Decision (Unanimous)	3	3:00
2024-01-12	Win	(France) Daren Rolland	ONE Friday Fights 47, Lumpinee Stadium	Bangkok, Thailand	TKO (3 Knockdowns)	3	2:11
2023-10-28	Draw	(Thailand) Comeback TK.Yuttana	Muay Thai Vithee TinThai + Kiatpetch	Buriram Province, Thailand	Decision	5	3:00
For the Muang Yama Muay Thai Featherweight title.
2023-09-08	Win	(Thailand) Kongchai Chanaidonmuang	ONE Friday Fights 32, Lumpinee Stadium	Bangkok, Thailand	Decision (Unanimous)	3	3:00
2023-06-30	Win	(China) Huo Xiaolong	ONE Friday Fights 23, Lumpinee Stadium	Bangkok, Thailand	Decision (Unanimous)	3	3:00
2023-03-12	Loss	(Japan) Akihiro Kaneko	K-1 World GP 2023: K'Festa 6	Tokyo, Japan	Decision (Majority)	3	3:00
For the K-1 Super Bantamweight Championship.
2023-01-20	Loss	(Thailand) Prajanchai P.K.Saenchaimuaythaigym	ONE Friday Fights 1, Lumpinee Stadium	Bangkok, Thailand	Decision (Unanimous)	3	3:00
2022-12-11	Win	(Thailand) Focus Adsanpatong	Chang MuayThai Kiatpetch Amarin Super Fight, Rajadamnern Stadium	Bangkok, Thailand	Decision	5	3:00
2022-11-05	Win	(Thailand) Comeback TK.Yuttana	TorNamThai Kiatpetch TKO, World Siam Stadium	Bangkok, Thailand	Decision	5	3:00
2022-10-08	Loss	(Thailand) View Petchkoson	TorNamThai TKO Kiatpetch + Muay Thai Kiatpetch, World Siam Stadium	Bangkok, Thailand	Decision	5	3:00
2022-09-11	Win	(Japan) Masashi Kumura	K-1 World GP 2022 Yokohamatsuri	Yokohama, Japan	Decision (Split)	3	3:00
2022-08-13	Win	(Thailand) View Petchkoson	Ruamponkon Samui, Petchbuncha Stadium	Ko Samui, Thailand	Decision	5	3:00
2022-06-20	Win	(Thailand) Tongnoi Lukbanyai	U-Muay RuamJaiKonRakMuayThai + Palangmai, Rajadamnern Stadium	Bangkok, Thailand	Decision	5	3:00
2022-05-22	Loss	(Thailand) View Petchkoson	Channel 7 Stadium	Bangkok, Thailand	Decision	5	3:00
Loses the Channel 7 Boxing Stadium 126 lbs title.
2022-04-03	Win	(Thailand) Ronachai Tor.Ramintra	Channel 7 Stadium	Bangkok, Thailand	Decision	5	3:00
2022-02-27	Win	(Thailand) Samingdam Chor.Ajalaboon	Channel 7 Stadium	Bangkok, Thailand	Decision	5	3:00
Defends Channel 7 Boxing Stadium 126 lbs title.
2022-01-09	Loss	(Thailand) Ronachai Tor.Ramintra	Chang MuayThai Kiatpetch Amarin, Rajadamnern Stadium	Thailand	Decision	5	3:00
2021-12-05	Win	(Thailand) Petchrungruang Por.Lakboon	Channel 7 Boxing Stadium	Bangkok, Thailand	Decision (Unanimous)	5	3:00
Wins the vacant Channel 7 Boxing Stadium 126 lbs Title.
2021-11-07	Loss	(Thailand) Petchrungruang Por.Lakboon	Channel 7 Boxing Stadium	Bangkok, Thailand	Decision (Split)	5	3:00
2021-09-28	Loss	(Thailand) View Petchkoson	VAR Muay Charity Event for Muay Thai, Fonjangchonburi Stadium	Chonburi, Thailand	Decision	5	3:00
2021-03-27	Win	(Thailand) Petch Or.Pimonsri	TKO Kiatpetch, Lumpinee Stadium	Bangkok, Thailand	KO (Low Kicks)	2	
2020-12-08	Loss	(Thailand) Prajanchai P.K.Saenchaimuaythaigym	Lumpinee Stadium Birthday Show	Bangkok, Thailand	Decision	5	3:00
2020-10-05	Win	(Thailand) Prajanchai P.K.Saenchaimuaythaigym	R1 UFA, World Siam Stadium	Bangkok, Thailand	Decision	5	3:00
2020-08-29	Win	(Thailand) Petchsamarn Sor.Samarngarment	OrTorGor.3 Stadium	Nonthaburi, Thailand	Decision	5	3:00
2020-07-19	Loss	(Thailand) Ronachai Tor.Ramintra	Channel 7 Boxing Stadium	Bangkok, Thailand	Decision	5	3:00
2020-02-17	Win	(Thailand) Fahpennueng Por.Lakboon	Rajadamnern Stadium	Bangkok, Thailand	KO	5	
2019-12-06	Loss	(Thailand) Puenkon Diamond98	Lumpinee Stadium	Bangkok, Thailand	KO (Left High Kick)	2	
For Thailand 122 lbs Title.
2019-10-08	Loss	(Thailand) Petchsamarn Sor.Samarngarment	Lumpinee Stadium	Bangkok, Thailand	Decision	5	3:00
2019-09-06	Loss	(Thailand) Ronachai Tor.Ramintra	Lumpinee Stadium	Bangkok, Thailand	Decision	5	3:00
2019-07-02	Draw	(Thailand) Ronachai Tor.Ramintra	Lumpinee Stadium	Bangkok, Thailand	Decision	5	3:00
2019-05-10	Win	(Thailand) Chokdee PK.Saenchaimuaythaigym	Lumpinee Stadium	Bangkok, Thailand	Decision	5	3:00
Wins vacant Lumpinee Stadium 118 lbs Title.
2019-03-19	Win	(Thailand) Watcharaphon P.K.Senchai	Lumpinee Stadium	Bangkok, Thailand	Decision	5	3:00
2019-02-12	Win	(Thailand) Jomhod Eminentair	Lumpinee Stadium	Bangkok, Thailand	Decision	5	3:00
2019-12-25	Win	(Thailand) Petchpailin Sitnumnoi	Lumpinee Stadium	Bangkok, Thailand	Decision	5	3:00
2018-11-13	Draw	(Thailand) Phetsommai Sor.Sommai	Lumpinee Stadium	Bangkok, Thailand	Decision	5	3:00
2018-10-14	Win	(Thailand) Donkings Morbeskamala	Lumpinee Stadium	Bangkok, Thailand	Decision	5	3:00
2018-09-07	Loss	(Thailand) Phetsommai Sor.Sommai	Lumpinee Stadium	Bangkok, Thailand	Decision	5	3:00
2018-06-24	Win	(Thailand) Ongree Sor Dechaphan	Channel 7 Boxing Stadium	Bangkok, Thailand	Decision	5	3:00
Wins Channel 7 Boxing Stadium 112 lbs Title.
2018-05-01	Loss	(Thailand) Kiew Parunchai	Lumpinee Stadium	Bangkok, Thailand	Decision (Split)	5	3:00
Lost the Lumpinee Stadium 112 lbs title and failed to capture the Thailand 112 lbs title.
2018-04-03	Win	(Thailand) Ongree Sor Dechaphan	Lumpinee Stadium	Bangkok, Thailand	Decision	5	3:00
Wins the Lumpinee Stadium 112 lbs Title.
2018-02-13	Win	(Thailand) KoKo Paemeanburi	Lumpinee Stadium	Bangkok, Thailand	Decision	5	3:00
2017-12-08	Win	(Thailand) KoKo Paemeanburi	Lumpinee Stadium	Bangkok, Thailand	Decision	5	3:00
Wins the Thailand 108 lbs Title.
2017-11-05	Win	(Thailand) Nengern Lukjaomaesaivari	Channel 7 Boxing Stadium	Bangkok, Thailand	Decision	5	3:00
Wins Channel 7 Boxing Stadium 108 lbs Title.
2017-09-08	Win	(Thailand) Phetphanrit Por.Lakboon	Lumpinee Stadium	Bangkok, Thailand	Decision	5	3:00
2017-07-26	Win	(Thailand) Chaiyo PetchyindeeAcademy	Lumpinee Stadium	Bangkok, Thailand	Decision	5	3:00
2017-06-20	Win	(Thailand) Domthong Lukjaoporrongtom	Lumpinee Stadium	Bangkok, Thailand	Decision	5	3:00
2017-05-05	Win	(Thailand) Yodpayak Sor.Jor.Lekmuangnont	Lumpinee Stadium	Bangkok, Thailand	Decision	5	3:00
2017-03-03	Win	(Thailand) Panphetlek Kiatjaroenchai	Lumpinee Stadium	Bangkok, Thailand	Decision	5	3:00
2016-12-09	Win	(Thailand) Saksri Kiatmoo9	Lumpinee Stadium	Bangkok, Thailand	KO	4	
2016-11-15	Win	(Thailand) Kaduklek Kor.Glomgieow	Lumpinee Stadium	Bangkok, Thailand	Decision	5	3:00
2016-09-09	Win	(Thailand) Kompai Sor.Jullasen	Lumpinee Stadium	Bangkok, Thailand	Decision	5	3:00
2016-08-02	Win	(Thailand) Kompai Sor.Jullasen	Lumpinee Stadium	Bangkok, Thailand	Decision	5	3:00
2016-06-28	Loss	(Thailand) Kampanath Por.Lakboon	Lumpinee Stadium	Bangkok, Thailand	Decision	5	3:00
2016-05-31	Win	(Thailand) Kaduklek Kor.Glomgieow	Lumpinee Stadium	Bangkok, Thailand	Decision	5	3:00
2016-04-22	Draw	(Thailand) Kaduklek Kor.Glomgieow	Lumpinee Stadium	Bangkok, Thailand	Decision	5	3:00
2016-03-29	Loss	(Thailand) Kaduklek Kor.Glomgieow	Lumpinee Stadium	Bangkok, Thailand	Decision	5	3:00
2016-01-24	Win	(Thailand) Bangklanoi Mor.Ratanabandit	Lumpinee Stadium	Bangkok, Thailand	Decision	5	3:00
2015-11-14	Loss	(Thailand) Superod Nopparat	Lumpinee Stadium	Bangkok, Thailand	KO	4	
2015-04-14	Loss	(Thailand) Padetsuk Chor.Patcharaphon	Lumpinee Stadium	Bangkok, Thailand	Decision	5	3:00
2015-03-03	Win	(Thailand) Phetnara Sor.Dechaphan	Lumpinee Stadium	Bangkok, Thailand	Decision	5	3:00
2015-01-30	Win	(Thailand) Yangdam Soonkilahuafai	Lumpinee Stadium	Bangkok, Thailand	KO	4	
2014-12-30	Win	(Thailand) Taleyngern Poraortaleybangsalay	Lumpinee Stadium	Bangkok, Thailand	Decision	5	3:00
2014-10-14	Loss	(Thailand) Wuttichai Sitnumnoi	Lumpinee Stadium	Bangkok, Thailand	Decision	5	3:00
Legend: Win Loss Draw/No contest Notes
