= Kiew Parunchai =

Thai Muay Thai fighter

- Born: Thongchai Huanak; May 31, 1997 (age 29); Chumphon, Thailand
- Height: 165 cm (5 ft 5 in)
- Weight: 53 kg (117 lb; 8.3 st)
- Stance: Orthodox
- Fighting out of: Thung Song, Thailand
- Team: Parunchai
- Trainer: Oley Kiatoneway

Kiew Parunchai (Thai: เขี้ยว พรัญชัย; born May 31, 1997) is a Thai Muay Thai fighter.

== Titles and accomplishments ==
=== Muay Thai ===
- Professional Boxing Association of Thailand (PAT)
  - 2015 Thailand 108 lbs Champion
  - 2017 Thailand 112 lbs Champion
- Lumpinee Stadium
  - 2017 Lumpinee Stadium 112 lbs Champion
  - 2018 Lumpinee Stadium 112 lbs Champion
  - 2018 Lumpinee Stadium 115 lbs Champion
  - 2017 Lumpinee Fight of the Year (July 11 vs Ongree Sor Dechaphan)
- Channel 7 Boxing Stadium
  - 2014 Channel 7 Stadium 105 lbs Champion
- Southeast Asian Games
  - 2025 SEA Games Muaythai -54 kg (silver)
- International Federation of Muaythai Associations
  - 2025 IFMA CISM Military Muaythai Challenge (gold)

=== Wushu ===
- Southeast Asian Games
  - 2021 Southeast Asian Games Men's Sanda 56 kg (bronze)

=== Kickboxing ===
- World Association of Kickboxing Organizations
  - 2024 WAKO Uzbekistan Kickboxing World Cup Low Kick -54 kg (gold)
  - 2024 WAKO Asia Kickboxing Championship Low Kick -54 kg (bronze)
  - 2025 WAKO Thailand 1st Kickboxing World Cup Low Kick -54 kg (silver)

== Fight record ==
Muay Thai Record
Date	Result	Opponent	Event	Location	Method	Round	Time
2024-06-12	Win	(Thailand) Methee Sor.Tor.Toipadriew	Rajadamnern Stadium	Bangkok, Thailand	Decision	5	3:00
2023-01-29	Win	(Thailand) Jakdao Phetkiapetch	Channel 7 Stadium	Bangkok, Thailand	Decision	5	3:00
2022-01-30	Win	(Thailand) Petchpailin SorJor.TongPrachin	Channel 7 Stadium	Bangkok, Thailand	Decision	5	3:00
2020-12-18	Draw	(Thailand) Parnthep V.K.Khaoyai	Suk Singmawin	Songkhla, Thailand	Decision	5	3:00
2020-10-25	Win	(Thailand) Petchpailin SorJor.TongPrachin	Channel 7 Stadium	Bangkok, Thailand	Decision	5	3:00
2020-09-06	Loss	(Thailand) Jomhod Eminentair	Channel 7 Stadium	Bangkok, Thailand	Decision	5	3:00
For the Channel 7 Stadium 115 lbs title
2020-02-09	Win	(Thailand) Jomhod Eminentair	Srithammaracha + Kiatpetch Super Fight	Nakhon Si Thammarat, Thailand	Decision	5	3:00
2020-01-18	Win	(Thailand) TeeYai Teeded99	Lumpinee Stadium	Bangkok, Thailand	Decision	5	3:00
2019-12-06	Loss	(Thailand) Petchrungruang Odtuekdaeng	Lumpinee Stadium	Bangkok, Thailand	Decision	5	3:00
2019-11-14	Loss	(Thailand) Petchpailin Sitnumnoi	Rajadamnern Stadium	Bangkok, Thailand	Decision	5	3:00
2019-08-11	Loss	(Thailand) Jomhod Eminentair	Nonthaburi Stadium	Nonthaburi, Thailand	Decision	5	3:00
2019-07-02	Loss	(Thailand) Watcharapol P.K.Senchai	Lumpinee Stadium	Bangkok, Thailand	Decision	5	3:00
2019-05-10	Win	(Thailand) Petchamnat Sawansangmanja	Lumpinee Stadium	Bangkok, Thailand	KO (Right High Kick)	3	
2019-03-19	Win	(Thailand) Petchpailin Sitnumnoi	Lumpinee Stadium	Bangkok, Thailand	Decision	5	3:00
2018-08-07	Loss	(Thailand) Rungnarai Kiatmuu9	Lumpinee Stadium	Bangkok, Thailand	Decision	5	3:00
2018-07-10	Loss	(Thailand) Watcharapol P.K.Senchai	Lumpinee Stadium	Bangkok, Thailand	Decision	5	3:00
2018-06-15	Win	(Japan) Kazuki Osaki	Lumpinee Stadium	Bangkok, Thailand	Decision	5	3:00
Defends Lumpinee Stadium 112 lbs Title.
2018-05-01	Win	(Thailand) Kompetch Sitsarawatsuer	Lumpinee Stadium	Bangkok, Thailand	Decision (Split)	5	3:00
Wins the Lumpinee Stadium 112 lbs and defends Thailand 112 lbs Title.
2018-03-06	Win	(Thailand) Watcharapol P.K.Senchai	Lumpinee Stadium	Bangkok, Thailand	Decision	5	3:00
Wins the Lumpinee Stadium 115 lbs Title.
2018-01-23	Win	(Thailand) Ongree Sor Dechaphan	Lumpinee Stadium	Bangkok, Thailand	Decision	5	3:00
2017-07-11	Loss	(Thailand) Ongree Sor Dechaphan	Lumpinee Stadium	Bangkok, Thailand	Decision	5	3:00
2017-06-09	Loss	(Thailand) Ongree Sor Dechaphan	Lumpinee Stadium	Bangkok, Thailand	Decision	5	3:00
Lost the Lumpinee Stadium 112 lbs Title.
2017-05-05	Loss	(Thailand) Saoek Kesagym	Lumpinee Stadium	Bangkok, Thailand	Decision	5	3:00
2017-03-07	Win	(Thailand) Banlungngoen Sawansangmanja	Lumpinee Stadium	Bangkok, Thailand	Decision	5	3:00
Wins vacant Lumpinee Stadium 112 lbs Title.
2016-12-09	Win	(Thailand) Petchpailin Sitnumnoi	Lumpinee Stadium	Bangkok, Thailand	Decision	5	3:00
Defends the Thailand 112 lbs Title.
2016-11-15	Win	(Thailand) Ongree Sor Dechaphan	Lumpinee Stadium	Bangkok, Thailand	Decision	5	3:00
2016-09-23	Win	(Thailand) Rit Jitmuangnon		Pa Tong, Thailand	Decision	5	3:00
Wins the Thailand 112 lbs Title.
2016-08-05	Win	(Thailand) Peemai Erewan		Songkhla, Thailand	Decision	5	3:00
2016-06-26	Loss	(Thailand) Ongree Sor Dechaphan	Lumpinee Stadium	Songkhla, Thailand	Decision	5	3:00
2016-04-24	Win	(Thailand) Detchaiya PetchyindeeAcademy	Rajadamnern Stadium	Bangkok, Thailand	KO	4	
2016-03-28	Draw	(Thailand) Detchaiya PetchyindeeAcademy		Nakhon Si Thammarat, Thailand	Decision	5	3:00
2016-02-01	Win	(Thailand) Priewpark Sor.Jor.Vichitpedriew	Rajadamnern Stadium	Bangkok, Thailand	Decision	5	3:00
2015-12-04	Loss	(Thailand) Virachat Boonrasi	Lumpinee Stadium	Bangkok, Thailand	Decision	5	3:00
2015-11-03	Loss	(Thailand) Rit Jitmuangnon	Lumpinee Stadium	Bangkok, Thailand	Decision	5	3:00
2015-09-11	Win	(Thailand) Den Sor.Ploenchit	Lumpinee Stadium	Bangkok, Thailand	Decision	5	3:00
2015-06-05	Loss	(Thailand) Singhaudorn Audaudorn	Lumpinee Stadium	Bangkok, Thailand	KO	4	
2015-05-30	Win	(Thailand) Petchwichit Sor.Jor.Vichitpedriew	Rangsit Stadium	Thailand	Decision	5	3:00
2015-04-29	Loss	(Thailand) Rit Jitmuangnon	Lumpinee Stadium	Bangkok, Thailand	Decision	5	3:00
2015-04-03	Win	(Thailand) Koko Paeminburi	Lumpinee Stadium	Bangkok, Thailand	Decision	5	3:00
2014-12-28	Win	(Thailand) Priewpark Yodaswintransport	Channel 7 Stadium	Bangkok, Thailand	Decision	5	3:00
Wins the Channel 7 Stadium 105 lbs Title.
2014-11-21	Win	(Thailand) Saisueb Pangnakhonban	Lumpinee Stadium	Bangkok, Thailand	Decision	5	3:00
2014-10-31	Win	(Thailand) Chaila Por.Lakboon	Lumpinee Stadium	Bangkok, Thailand	Decision	5	3:00
2014-10-06	Win	(Thailand) Chatchai P.K.Saenchai	Lumpinee Stadium	Bangkok, Thailand	Decision	5	3:00
2014-09-07	Loss	(Thailand) Den Sor.Ploenchit	Channel 7 Stadium	Bangkok, Thailand	Decision	5	3:00
Legend: Win Loss Draw/No contest Notes

Amateur Kickboxing and Muay Thai Record
Date	Result	Opponent	Event	Location	Method	Round	Time
2025-07-12	Win	(Bahrain) Abdulla Jamal Isa	2025 CISM Military Muaythai Challenge, Final	Chonburi, Thailand	TKO (Low kicks)		
Wins the 2025 IFMA CISM Military Muaythai Challenge Gold Medal.
2025-04-12	Loss	(France) Lorenzo Navarro	1st Thailand Kickboxing World Cup 2025, Final	Bangkok, Thailand	Decision	3	2:00
Wins the 1st Thailand Kickboxing World Cup 2025 Low Kick -54kg Silver Medal.
2025-04-11	Win	(Philippines) Mikko Camingawan	1st Thailand Kickboxing World Cup 2025, Semifinals	Bangkok, Thailand	Decision (split)	3	2:00
2024-10-	Loss	(Cambodia) Koemieng Him	2024 WAKO Asian Kickboxing Championship, Semifinals	Phnom Penh, Cambodia	Decision (split)	3	2:00
Wins the 2024 WAKO Asian Kickboxing Championship Low Kick -54kg Bronze Medal.
2024-09-29	Win	(Mauritius) Jean Christopher Warren Robertson	2024 WAKO Uzbekistan World Cup, Final	Tashkent, Uzbekistan			
Wins the 2024 WAKO Uzbekistan World Cup Low Kick -54kg Gold Medal.
2024-09-28	Win	(Uzbekistan) Nazarbek Mahmudov	2024 WAKO Uzbekistan World Cup, Semifinals	Tashkent, Uzbekistan	Decision (unanimous)	3	2:00
2024-09-27	Win	(Kyrgyzstan) Ulanbek Kasymbekov	2024 WAKO Uzbekistan World Cup, Quarterfinals	Tashkent, Uzbekistan	Decision (unanimous)	3	2:00
Legend: Win Loss Draw/No contest Notes
