= Ronachai Tor.Ramintra =

Thai professional Muay Thai fighter

Ronachai
- Born: November 19, 1997 (age 28); Ubon Ratchathani, Thailand
- Other names: Ronachai Santi-Ubon; Ronachai Kaewlok2; Ronachai Por.Petchsiri; Ronachai Aunsukhumvit; Ronachai Wor.Yijeen
- Height: 171 cm (5 ft 7 in)
- Division: Mini Flyweight; Flyweight; Super Flyweight; Bantamweight; Featherweight
- Fighting out of: Bangkok, Thailand
- Team: Paeminburi; Santi Ubon

Ronachai Tor.Ramintra (Thai: รณชัย ต.รามอินทรา), is a Thai professional Muay Thai fighter. He is former three-division Lumpinee Stadium champion.

He currently trains out of Pangkongprab-Paeminburi camp alongside Suesat Paeminburi and Kaka Paeminburi (Sok Thy).

== Titles and accomplishments ==
- Lumpinee Stadium
  - 2014 Lumpinee Stadium Mini Flyweight (105 lbs) title
  - 2015 Lumpinee Stadium Fighter of the Year
  - 2016 Lumpinee Stadium Flyweight (112 lbs) title
  - 2017 Lumpinee Stadium Bantamweight (118 lbs) title
- Channel 7 Boxing Stadium
  - 2025 Channel 7 Stadium Featherweight (126 lbs) Champion
- Awards
  - 2022 Sports Authority of Thailand Fighter of the Year

== Muay Thai record ==
Professional Muay Thai record
| Date | Result | Opponent | Event | Location | Method | Round | Time |
|---|---|---|---|---|---|---|---|
| 2026-11-26 | | (Thailand) Chujai ChujaiMuayThai | Kiatpetch, Channel 7 Stadium | Bangkok, Thailand | | | |
For the Channel 7 Stadium Featherweight (126 lbs) title.
| 2026-11-01 | Win | (Thailand) PetchApichat ApichatMuayThaiGym | Channel 7 Stadium | Bangkok, Thailand | Decision | 5 | 3:00 |
| 2026-09-08 | Win | (Thailand) Pornsanae Sor.Phumipat | Siam Real Combat, World Siam Stadium | Bangkok, Thailand | Decision | 5 | 3:00 |
| 2026-08-02 | Win | (Thailand) PetchApichat ApichatMuayThaiGym | Channel 7 Stadium | Bangkok, Thailand | Decision | 5 | 3:00 |
| 2026-06-07 | Loss | (Thailand) Chujai ChujaiMuayThai | Kiatpetch, Channel 7 Stadium | Bangkok, Thailand | Decision | 5 | 3:00 |
Loses the Channel 7 Stadium Featherweight (126 lbs) title.
| 2026-04-12 | Loss | (Thailand) Pornsanae Sor.Phumipat | Channel 7 Stadium | Bangkok, Thailand | Decision | 5 | 3:00 |
| 2025-12-06 | Loss | (Thailand) Chiebkhad Por.Pongsawang | Rajadamnern World Series | Bangkok, Thailand | Decision (Majority) | 5 | 3:00 |
For the interim Rajadamnern Stadium Featherweight (126 lbs) title.
| 2025-07-27 | Win | (Thailand) View Petchkoson | Kiatpetch, Channel 7 Stadium | Bangkok, Thailand | Decision (Unanimous) | 5 | 3:00 |
Wins the Channel 7 Stadium Featherweight (126 lbs) title.
| 2025-04-12 | Win | (Thailand) View Petchkoson | Rajadamnern World Series | Bangkok, Thailand | Decision (Unanimous) | 3 | 3:00 |
| 2024-11-02 | Loss | (Thailand) Chaila Por.Lakboon | Rajadamnern World Series - Final 4 | Bangkok, Thailand | Decision (Split) | 3 | 3:00 |
| 2024-09-28 | Win | (Uzbekistan) Samandar Khasanov | Rajadamnern World Series - Group Stage | Bangkok, Thailand | TKO (Body punches) | 3 | 1:43 |
| 2024-08-24 | Win | (Thailand) Samingdaeng Wor.Jakrawut | Rajadamnern World Series - Group Stage | Bangkok, Thailand | Decision (Unanimous) | 3 | 3:00 |
| 2024-07-13 | Win | (Israel) Ruach Gordon | Rajadamnern World Series - Group Stage | Bangkok, Thailand | Decision (Unanimous) | 3 | 3:00 |
| 2024-05-04 | Win | (Iran) Milad Tavakoli | Rajadamnern World Series | Bangkok, Thailand | Decision (Unanimous) | 3 | 3:00 |
| 2023-09-11 | Loss | (Thailand) Yothin FA Group | Sor.Sommai Birthday, Thupatemi Stadium | Pathum Thani province, Thailand | Decision (Unanimous) | 5 | 3:00 |
For the vacant Thailand Featherweight (126 lbs) title.
| 2023-06-02 | Win | (Thailand) Ekkalak Sor.SamarnGarment | ONE Friday Fights 19, Lumpinee Stadium | Bangkok, Thailand | Decision (Unanimous) | 3 | 3:00 |
| 2023-03-05 | Loss | (Japan) Eisaku Ogasawara | KNOCK OUT 2023 SUPER BOUT BLAZE | Tokyo, Japan | Decision (Unanimous) | 3 | 3:00 |
| 2023-01-29 | Win | (Thailand) Samingdam Chor.Ajalaboon | TorNamThai Kiatpetch TKO, Rajadamnern Stadium | Bangkok, Thailand | Decision | 5 | 3:00 |
| 2022-11-13 | Win | (Thailand) View Petchkoson | Amarin Super Fight, Rajadamnern Stadium | Bangkok, Thailand | Decision | 5 | 3:00 |
| 2022-09-03 | Win | (Thailand) Focus Adsanpatong | TorNamThai TKO Kiatpetch, World Siam Stadium | Bangkok, Thailand | Decision | 5 | 3:00 |
| 2022-06-20 | Win | (Thailand) Yothin FA Group | U-Muay RuamJaiKonRakMuayThai + Palangmai, Rajadamnern Stadium | Bangkok, Thailand | Decision | 5 | 3:00 |
| 2022-05-28 | Win | (Thailand) Petchrungruang SorJor.TongPrachin | TorNamThai TKO Kiatpetch, Sor.Salacheep Stadium | Lopburi province, Thailand | Decision | 5 | 3:00 |
| 2022-04-03 | Loss | (Thailand) Kompetch Or.Atchariya | Channel 7 Stadium | Bangkok, Thailand | Decision | 5 | 3:00 |
| 2022-01-09 | Win | (Thailand) Kompetch Or.Atchariya | Chang MuayThai Kiatpetch Amarin, Rajadamnern Stadium | Thailand | Decision | 5 | 3:00 |
| 2021-10-24 | Loss | (Thailand) Samingdam Chor.Ajalaboon | Channel 7 Stadium | Bangkok, Thailand | Decision | 5 | 3:00 |
| 2021-03-28 | Loss | (Thailand) Prajanchai P.K.Saenchaimuaythaigym | Channel 7 Stadium | Bangkok, Thailand | Decision (Unanimous) | 5 | 3:00 |
| 2020-12-08 | Win | (Thailand) Fahpennueng Por.Lakboon | Lumpinee Stadium Birthday Show | Bangkok, Thailand | Decision | 5 | 3:00 |
| 2020-10-05 | Win | (Thailand) Saoek Sitchefboontham | R1 UFA, World Siam Stadium | Bangkok, Thailand | Decision | 5 | 3:00 |
| 2020-08-30 | Win | (Thailand) Chaila Por.Lakboon | Channel 7 Stadium | Bangkok, Thailand | Decision | 5 | 3:00 |
| 2020-07-19 | Win | (Thailand) Kompetch Sitsarawatsuer | Channel 7 Stadium | Bangkok, Thailand | Decision | 5 | 3:00 |
| 2020-02-11 | Loss | (Thailand) Chaila Por.Lakboon | Lumpinee Stadium | Bangkok, Thailand | Decision | 5 | 3:00 |
| 2020-01-14 | Win | (Thailand) Petch Sawansangmanja | Lumpinee Stadium | Bangkok, Thailand | Decision | 5 | 3:00 |
| 2019-12-06 | Win | (Thailand) Petchmuangsri Odtuekdaeng | Lumpinee Stadium | Bangkok, Thailand | Decision | 5 | 3:00 |
| 2019-11-05 | Loss | (Thailand) Petchsamarn Sor.Samarngarment | Lumpinee Stadium | Bangkok, Thailand | Decision | 5 | 3:00 |
| 2019-09-06 | Win | (Thailand) Kompetch Sitsarawatsuer | Lumpinee Stadium | Bangkok, Thailand | Decision | 5 | 3:00 |
| 2019-07-02 | Draw | (Thailand) Kompetch Sitsarawatsuer | Lumpinee Stadium | Bangkok, Thailand | Decision | 5 | 3:00 |
| 2019-05-28 | Loss | (Thailand) Petch Sawansangmanja | Lumpinee Stadium | Bangkok, Thailand | Decision | 5 | 3:00 |
| 2019-04-21 | Draw | (Thailand) Petch Sawansangmanja | Channel 7 Stadium | Bangkok, Thailand | Decision | 5 | 3:00 |
| 2018-12-07 | Loss | (Thailand) Khunsueknoi Sitkaewprapon | Lumpinee Stadium | Bangkok, Thailand | Decision | 5 | 3:00 |
| 2018-11-09 | Loss | (Thailand) Khunsueknoi Sitkaewprapon | Lumpinee Stadium | Bangkok, Thailand | Decision | 5 | 3:00 |
| 2018-03-06 | Loss | (Thailand) Worawut Bowygym | Lumpinee Stadium | Bangkok, Thailand | Decision | 5 | 3:00 |
For the vacant Lumpinee Stadium (122 lbs) title.
| 2018-02-06 | Draw | (Thailand) Fahmai Por.Ruangram | Lumpinee Stadium | Bangkok, Thailand | Decision | 5 | 3:00 |
| 2017-12-08 | Win | (Thailand) Chalam Parunchai | Lumpinee Stadium | Bangkok, Thailand | Decision | 5 | 3:00 |
| 2017-11-14 | Win | (Thailand) Chatchai PK.SaenchaiMuayThaiGym | Lumpinee Stadium | Bangkok, Thailand | Decision | 5 | 3:00 |
| 2017-09-05 | Loss | (Thailand) Prajanchai P.K.Saenchaimuaythaigym | Lumpinee Stadium | Bangkok, Thailand | Decision | 5 | 3:00 |
| 2017-08-08 | Loss | (Thailand) Chatchai PK.SaenchaiMuayThaiGym | Lumpinee Stadium | Bangkok, Thailand | Decision | 5 | 3:00 |
| 2017-06-09 | Win | (Thailand) Kengkart Por.Pekko | Lumpinee Stadium | Bangkok, Thailand | Decision | 5 | 3:00 |
Wins the vacant Lumpinee Stadium Bantamweight (118 lbs) title.
| 2017-04-28 | Win | (Thailand) Watcharapon PK.SaenchaiMuayThaiGym | Lumpinee Stadium | Bangkok, Thailand | Decision | 5 | 3:00 |
| 2017-03-28 | Loss | (Thailand) Wanchalong PK.Saenchai | Lumpinee Stadium | Bangkok, Thailand | Decision | 5 | 3:00 |
| 2017-02-19 | Loss | (Thailand) Wanchalong PK.Saenchai | Channel 7 Boxing Stadium | Bangkok, Thailand | Decision | 5 | 3:00 |
For the Channel 7 Stadium Super Flyweight (115 lbs) title
| 2017-01-15 | Win | (Thailand) Kumandoi Petcharoenvit | Rangsit Stadium | Rangsit, Thailand | Decision | 5 | 3:00 |
| 2016-11-22 | Draw | (Thailand) Watcharapon PK.SaenchaiMuayThaiGym | Lumpinee Stadium | Bangkok, Thailand | Decision | 5 | 3:00 |
| 2016-10-09 | Win | (Thailand) Boonchana Nayokatasala | Channel 7 Stadium | Bangkok, Thailand | Decision | 5 | 3:00 |
| 2016-09-02 | Loss | (Thailand) Kiewpayak Jitmuangnon | Lumpinee Stadium | Bangkok, Thailand | Decision | 5 | 3:00 |
Loses the Lumpinee Stadium Flyweight (112 lbs) title.
| 2016-06-28 | Loss | (Thailand) Watcharapon PK.SaenchaiMuayThaiGym | Lumpinee Stadium | Bangkok, Thailand | Decision | 5 | 3:00 |
| 2016-06-03 | Win | (Thailand) Sarawut Sor.Jor.Vichitpadriw | Lumpinee Stadium | Bangkok, Thailand | Decision | 5 | 3:00 |
Wins the Lumpinee Stadium Flyweight (112 lbs) title.
| 2016-05-02 | Win | (Thailand) Kiewpayak Jitmuangnon | Rajadamnern Stadium | Bangkok, Thailand | Decision | 5 | 3:00 |
| 2016-03-29 | Win | (Thailand) Kiewpayak Jitmuangnon | Lumpinee Stadium | Bangkok, Thailand | Decision | 5 | 3:00 |
| 2016-03-02 | Loss | (Thailand) Kiewpayak Jitmuangnon | Rajadamnern Stadium | Bangkok, Thailand | Decision | 5 | 3:00 |
| 2016-01-31 | Loss | (Thailand) Watcharapon PK.SaenchaiMuayThaiGym | Channel 7 Stadium | Bangkok, Thailand | Decision | 5 | 3:00 |
| 2015-11-17 | Win | (Thailand) Banlangngeon Por Peenapat | | Ubon Ratchathani, Thailand | Decision | 5 | 3:00 |
| 2015-10-09 | Win | (Thailand) Rungnarai Kiatmuu9 | Lumpinee Stadium | Bangkok, Thailand | Decision | 5 | 3:00 |
| 2015-09-04 | Win | (Thailand) Phetrung Nayokkaipedriew | Lumpinee Stadium | Bangkok, Thailand | Decision | 5 | 3:00 |
| 2015-07-28 | Win | (Thailand) Raktemroi Visutjaroenyont | Lumpinee Stadium | Bangkok, Thailand | Decision | 5 | 3:00 |
| 2015-06-29 | Win | (Thailand) Sam-D PetchyindeeAcademy | | Udon Thani, Thailand | Decision | 5 | 3:00 |
| 2015-05-01 | Draw | (Thailand) Ongree Sor.Dechaphan | | Koh Samui, Thailand | Decision | 5 | 3:00 |
| 2015-04-03 | Win | (Thailand) Phetrung Nayokkaipedriew | Lumpinee Stadium | Bangkok, Thailand | Decision | 5 | 3:00 |
| 2015-03-03 | Win | (Thailand) Banlangngeon Por Peenapat | Lumpinee Stadium | Bangkok, Thailand | Decision | 5 | 3:00 |
| 2015-01-15 | Win | (Thailand) Ongree Sor.Dechaphan | Rajadamnern Stadium | Bangkok, Thailand | Decision | 5 | 3:00 |
| 2014-12-06 | Win | (Thailand) Senpayak Phor.Jaroenpeth | Lumpinee Stadium | Bangkok, Thailand | Decision | 5 | 3:00 |
Wins the Lumpinee Stadium Mini Flyweight (105 lbs) title.
| 2014-10-31 | Win | (Thailand) Phetmuangnon Jitmuangnon | Lumpinee Stadium | Bangkok, Thailand | Decision | 5 | 3:00 |
| 2014-09-30 | Win | (Thailand) Rit Jitmuangnon | Lumpinee Stadium | Bangkok, Thailand | Decision | 5 | 3:00 |
| 2014-09-09 | Win | (Thailand) Anuwat Numjeantawanna | Lumpinee Stadium | Bangkok, Thailand | Decision | 5 | 3:00 |
| 2014-07-04 | Loss | (Thailand) Banlangngeon Por Peenapat | Lumpinee Stadium | Bangkok, Thailand | Decision | 5 | 3:00 |
| 2014-01-10 | Win | (Thailand) Petchjetse Sor Tienpo | Lumpinee Stadium | Bangkok, Thailand | Decision | 5 | 3:00 |
| 2013-12-06 | Win | (Thailand) Ne-ngeon Lukjaomaesaiwaree | Lumpinee Stadium | Bangkok, Thailand | Decision | 5 | 3:00 |
Legend: Win Loss Draw/No contest Notes

== See also ==
- List of male kickboxers
