= Saoek Sitchefboontham =

Thai Muay Thai fighter

- Born: Ammarin Fuklin; August 16, 1997 (age 29); Thailand
- Other names: Saoek Or.Atchariya (เสาเอก อ.อัจฉริยะ); Saoek Kesagym (เสาเอก เคซ่ายิม); SaoEk Sorsanglui; SaoEk BT.Deporte
- Height: 165 cm (5 ft 5 in)
- Weight: 55 kg (121 lb; 8.7 st)
- Fighting out of: Bangkok, Thailand

Other information
- Notable relatives: Saotho Sitchefboontham (twin brother)

Saoek Sitchefboontham (Thai: เสาเอก ศิษย์เชฟบุญธรรม) is a Thai Muay Thai fighter.

== Muay thai career ==
On November 1, 2019, Saoek fought Eisaku Ogasawara at KNOCK OUT 2019 Breaking Dawn in his first fight outside of Thailand. He won the bout by a second round head kick.

On February 13, 2020, Saoek won his first major muay thai title, as he captured the Rajadamnern Stadium super bantamweight title with a decision win against Thepthaksin Sor.Sornsing.

On October 28, 2021, it was announced that Saoek and his brother Saotho had their contracts bought out by Petchyindee.

On March 30, 2023, Saoek was announced among the three fighters shortlisted for the 2022 Sports Writers Association of Thailand Fighter of the Year award.

On April 27, 2023 Saoek lost by decision to Diesellek BuildJC. The next day he admitted to have been paid to lose the fight, he received a lifetime ban from his gym owner and from the Petchyindee promotion. Saoek would not give the identity of the person he took the 200,000 baht bribe from, he also revealed his gambling and kratom drug addiction.

== Titles and accomplishments ==
- Rajadamnern Stadium
  - 2016 Rajadamnern Stadium 112 lbs Champion
  - 2016 SAT Rajadamnern Stadium Young Fighter of the Year
  - 2020 Rajadamnern Stadium 122 lbs Champion
- Petchyindee True4U
  - 2022 True4U 118 lbs Champion
- World Boxing Council Muaythai
  - 2025 WBC Muaythai World Super Bantamweight (122 lbs) Champion

== Fight record ==
Muay Thai Record
140 Wins (24 (T)KO's), 35 Losses, 5 Draws
Date	Result	Opponent	Event	Location	Method	Round	Time
2026-11-19	Win	PetchThailand Or.Kitkasem	Petchyindee, Rajadamnern Stadium	Bangkok, Thailand	Decision	5	3:00
2026-10-15	Win	(Thailand) Puenyai Por.Lakboon	Petchyindee, Rajadamnern Stadium	Bangkok, Thailand	Decision	5	3:00
2026-08-27	Win	(Thailand) Nueng Erawan	Petchyindee, Rajadamnern Stadium	Bangkok, Thailand	Decision	5	3:00
2026-06-25	Loss	(Thailand) Puenyai Por.Lakboon	Petchyindee, Rajadamnern Stadium	Bangkok, Thailand	Decision	5	3:00
2026-05-21	Win	(Thailand) Petchsithong Sor.Saknarin	Petchyindee, Rajadamnern Stadium	Bangkok, Thailand	KO	3	
2026-03-01	Loss	(Thailand) Chanyuth Tded99	Muaydee VitheeThai	Thailand	Decision	5	3:00
2026-01-16	Win	(Thailand) Petchsongley RawaiMuayThai	Jitmuangnon, Jitmuangnon Stadium	Nonthaburi province, Thailand	Decision	5	3:00
2025-12-02	Win	(Thailand) Yokmorakot Wor.Sangprapai	Amazing MuayThai Fight Night 2	Bangkok, Thailand	Decision (Unanimous)	5	3:00
Wins the vacant WBC Muay Thai World Super Bantamweight (122 lbs) title.
2025-03-17	Win	(Thailand) Yokmorakot Wor.Sangprapai	Samui Super Fight, Phetchbuncha Stadium	Phuket, Thailand	Decision	5	3:00
2024-11-10	Win	(Cambodia) Kong Hov	Ganzberg Kun Khmer	Pursat province, Cambodia	Decision	3	3:00
2023-04-27	Loss	(Thailand) Diesellek BuildJC	Petchyindee, Rajadamnern Stadium	Bangkok, Thailand	Decision	5	3:00
2023-02-23	Win	(Thailand) Yokmorakot Wor.Sangprapai	Petchyindee, Rajadamnern Stadium	Bangkok, Thailand	Decision	5	3:00
2022-11-18	Win	(Thailand) Petchpailin SorJor.Tongprachin	Ruamponkon + Prachin	Prachinburi province, Thailand	TKO (Doctor stoppage)	4	
2022-10-20	Draw	(Thailand) Diesellek BuildJC	Petchyindee, Rajadamnern Stadium	Bangkok, Thailand	Decision	5	3:00
2022-09-09	Win	(Thailand) Longern Dabransarakham	Muaymanwasuk, Rajadamnern Stadium	Bangkok, Thailand	Decision	5	3:00
2022-07-05	Win	(Thailand) Kumandoi PetchyindeeAcademy	Muaymansananmuang, Rangsit Stadium	Bangkok, Thailand	Decision	5	3:00
Defended the True4U 118 lbs title.
2022-05-12	Win	(Thailand) Petchsila Wor.Auracha	Petchyindee, Rajadamnern Stadium	Bangkok, Thailand	Decision (Unanimous)	5	3:00
Won the vacant True4U 118 lbs title.
2022-03-17	Loss	(Thailand) Diesellek PetchyindeeAcademy	Petchyindee, Rajadamnern Stadium	Bangkok, Thailand	Decision	5	3:00
For the True4U 122 lbs title.
2021-12-03	Win	(Thailand) Petchpailin Sor.Jor.Tongprachin	Muaymanwansuk	Buriram Province, Thailand	Decision	5	3:00
2021-11-05	Win	(Thailand) Kumandoi PetchyindeeAcademy	Muaymanwansuk	Buriram Province, Thailand	Decision	5	3:00
2021-04-08	Win	(Thailand) Puenkon Tor.Surat	Mahakam Muay Ruam PonKon Chana + Petchyindee	Songkhla province, Thailand	Decision	5	3:00
2021-03-15	Draw	(Thailand) Kumandoi Petcharoenvit	Chef Boontham, Rangsit Stadium	Rangsit, Thailand	Decision	5	3:00
2020-11-07	Win	(Thailand) Kumandoi Petcharoenvit	SAT HERO SERIES, World Siam Stadium	Bangkok, Thailand	TKO (Doctor Stop/Cut)	4	
2020-10-05	Loss	(Thailand) Ronachai Tor.Ramintra	R1 UFA, World Siam Stadium	Bangkok, Thailand	Decision	5	3:00
2020-09-01	Win	(Thailand) Kumandoi Petcharoenvit	ChefBoontham, Thanakorn Stadium	Nakhon Pathom Province, Thailand	Decision	5	3:00
2020-07-27	Win	(Thailand) Petchsamarn Sor.Samarngarment	ChefBoontham, Thanakorn Stadium	Nakhon Pathom province, Thailand	Decision	5	3:00
2020-02-13	Win	(Thailand) Thepthaksin Sor.Sornsing	ChefBoontham, Rajadamnern Stadium	Bangkok, Thailand	Decision	5	3:00
Wins the vacant Rajadamnern Stadium 122 lbs title.
2019-12-23	Win	(Thailand) Diesellek Wor.Wanchai	ChefBoontham + Rajadamnern Stadium Anniversary	Bangkok, Thailand	Decision	5	3:00
2019-11-01	Win	(Japan) Eisaku Ogasawara	KNOCK OUT 2019 BREAKING DAWN	Tokyo, Japan	KO (High Kick)	2	2:29
2019-09-09	Win	(Thailand) Saensak Sor.Boonyiem	Chujaroen Muay Thai, Rajadamnern Stadium	Bangkok, Thailand	KO	4	
2019-07-29	Loss	(Thailand) Samingdam MiamiCondoBangpu	Sor.Sommai, Rajadamnern Stadium	Bangkok, Thailand	Decision	5	3:00
2019-04-25	Loss	(Thailand) Petchbankaek Sor.Sommai	Sor.Sommai, Rajadamnern Stadium	Bangkok, Thailand	Decision	5	3:00
2019-03-15	Win	(Thailand) Phetboonsung Phetjinda	Rajadamnern Stadium	Bangkok, Thailand	Decision	5	3:00
2019-01-23	Win	(Thailand) Petchtamaew Sor.Satra	Chujaroen Muay Thai, Rajadamnern Stadium	Bangkok, Thailand	Decision	5	3:00
2018-12-24	Loss	(Thailand) Petchbankaek Sor.Sommai	Bangrachan, Rajadamnern Stadium	Bangkok, Thailand	Decision	5	3:00
2018-11-29	Loss	(Thailand) Berkban Ansukhumvit	Sor.Sommai, Rajadamnern Stadium	Bangkok, Thailand	Decision	5	3:00
2018-10-11	Loss	(Thailand) Padetsuek Gor.Kampanat	Sitchefboontham, Rajadamnern Stadium	Bangkok, Thailand	Decision	5	3:00
2018-09-06	Loss	(Thailand) Padetsuek Gor.Kampanat	Sitchefboontham, Rajadamnern Stadium	Bangkok, Thailand	Decision	5	3:00
2018-08-02	Win	(Thailand) Padetsuek Gor.Kampanat	Sitchefboontham, Rajadamnern Stadium	Bangkok, Thailand	Decision	5	3:00
2018-05-14	Win	(Thailand) Prakaipetch Nitisamui	Tor.Chaiwat, Rajadamnern Stadium	Bangkok, Thailand	Decision	5	3:00
2018-04-05	Loss	(Thailand) Metee Sor.Jor.Toipaedriw	Sor.Sommai, Rajadamnern Stadium	Bangkok, Thailand	Decision	5	3:00
2018-03-14	Win	(Thailand) Samingdam MiamiCondoBangpu	Tor.Chaiwat, Rajadamnern Stadium	Bangkok, Thailand	Decision	5	3:00
2018-01-25	Loss	(Thailand) Padetsuek Gor.Kampanat	Tor.Chaiwat, Rajadamnern Stadium	Bangkok, Thailand	Decision	5	3:00
2017-12-21	Win	(Thailand) Rambong Leesawgarnka	Sor.Sommai + Chefboontham, Rajadamnern Stadium	Bangkok, Thailand	Decision	5	3:00
2017-08-31	Loss	(Thailand) Kongthoranee Sor.Sommai	Petchaophraya, Rajadamnern Stadium	Bangkok, Thailand	KO (left elbow)	4	
2017-07-31	Loss	(Thailand) Phetrung Nayokkaipedriew	Rajadamnern Stadium	Bangkok, Thailand	Decision	5	3:00
2017-06-05	Loss	(Thailand) Rungnarai Kiatmuu9	Rajadamnern Stadium	Bangkok, Thailand	Decision	5	3:00
2017-05-05	Win	(Thailand) Kiew Parunchai	Lumpinee Stadium	Bangkok, Thailand	Decision	5	3:00
2017-03-30	Win	(Thailand) Gingsanglek Tor.Laksong	Rajadamnern Stadium	Bangkok, Thailand	Decision	5	3:00
2017-02-09	Win	(Thailand) Gingsanglek Tor.Laksong	Rajadamnern Stadium	Bangkok, Thailand	Decision	5	3:00
2016-12-22	Win	(Thailand) Oley Tor.Laksong	Rajadamnern Stadium	Bangkok, Thailand	Decision	5	3:00
2016-11-16	Win	(Thailand) Kongsak Sor.Satra		Bangkok, Thailand	KO	5	
2016-09-15	Win	(Thailand) Thanadej Tor.Phran49	Rajadamnern Stadium	Bangkok, Thailand	Decision	5	3:00
2016-08-10	Win	(Thailand) Detchaiya Petchyindee	Rajadamnern Stadium	Bangkok, Thailand	Decision	5	3:00
2016-07-04	Win	(Thailand) Chatploy Sor.Phulusawat	Rajadamnern Stadium	Bangkok, Thailand	Decision	5	3:00
2016-05-12	Win	(Thailand) Dokmaidaeng JSP	Rajadamnern Stadium	Bangkok, Thailand	Decision	5	3:00
Wins the Rajadamnern Stadium 112 lbs title.
2016-04-21	Win	(Thailand) Phetchiangkwan Nayoksomdet	Rajadamnern Stadium	Bangkok, Thailand	Decision	5	3:00
2016-03-24	Win	(Thailand) Kongthoranee Sor.Sommai	Rajadamnern Stadium	Bangkok, Thailand	Decision	5	3:00
2016-02-25	Win	(Thailand) Banchachai Por.Petchsiri	Rajadamnern Stadium	Bangkok, Thailand	Decision	5	3:00
2016-01-18	Win	(Thailand) Kongthoranee Sor.Sommai	Rajadamnern Stadium	Bangkok, Thailand	Decision	5	3:00
2015-12-27	Loss	(Thailand) Den Sor.PhetUdon	Ladprao Stadium	Thailand	Decision	5	3:00
2015-11-16	Win	(Thailand) Chartser Or.Bor.Tor.Lamphongtami	Rajadamnern Stadium	Bangkok, Thailand	Decision	5	3:00
Legend: Win Loss Draw/No contest Notes

Amateur Muay Thai Record
Date	Result	Opponent	Event	Location	Method	Round	Time
2022-05-31	Loss	(Iraq) Ali Kinanah	IFMA Senior World Championships 2022, Quarter Finals	Abu Dhabi, United Arab Emirates	Decision (Split)	3	3:00
Legend: Win Loss Draw/No contest Notes
