= Petchsamarn Sor.Samarngarment =

Thai professional Muay Thai fighter

- Born: September 9, 1998 (age 28); Samrong Thap, Surin, Thailand
- Other names: Newsaenchai Pakornphonsurin (นิวแสนชัย ปกรณ์พรสุรินทร์)
- Height: 170 cm (5 ft 7 in)
- Division: Super Bantamweight
- Style: Muay Thai (Muay Femur)
- Stance: Southpaw
- Fighting out of: Bangkok, Thailand
- Team: Por Pinnapat Gym

Kickboxing record
- Total: 91
- Wins: 67
- Losses: 24
- Draws: 0

Petchsamarn Sor.Samarngarment (Thai: เพชรสมาน ส.สมานการ์เม้นท์) is a Thai professional Muay Thai fighter. He is a former Rajadamnern Stadium Super Bantamweight Champion and former Channel 7 Super Bantamweight Champion.

== Career ==
Petchsamarn debuted his career in Bangkok under the name Newsaenchai Pakornphonsurin. At the end of 2017, following a series of losses he went back to compete in the provinces, at this occasion he changed his ring name to Petchsamarn Sor.Samarngarment. He went on an extended win streak throughout 2018 that led him to be picked up by the Kiatpetch promotion back in Bangkok.

On July 17, 2019, Petchsamarn stopped Chokdee PK.Saenchaimuaythaigym on cuts at Lumpinee Stadium.

On October 8, 2019, Petchsamarn defeated two weight Lumpinee Stadium champion Kompetch Sitsarawatsuer by decision. The following month he defeated three weight Lumpinee Stadium Champion Ronachai Tor.Ramintra by decision, taking his win streak to nineteen in a row and cementing his position as an elite fighter in the 122 lbs division.

Petchsamarn's undefeated streak came to an end when he was defeated by decision in a fight against Prajanchai P.K.Saenchaimuaythaigym on December 6, 2019 They rematched with the vacant Lumpinee Stadium 122 lbs title at stake. Petchsamarn lost the fight by decision again.

Following his title fight defeat Petchsamarn lost five fights in a row. He was defeated by decision against Chaila Por.Lakboon, Kompetch Sitsarawatsuer and Saoek Sitchefboontham. His losing streak reached its lowest point when he was stopped by Boonlong Petchyindee in the second round on October 9, 2020, at Rangsit Stadium for the Muaymanwansuk promotion.

Back to competition after a nine-month break due to the COVID-19 pandemic, Petchsamarn faced Petchmaeprik Fordpayakdaennua for the vacant Channel 7 Stadium 122 lbs title on December 12, 2021. He won the fight by decision. Petchsamarn failed to protect his title on May 22, 2022, when he was defeated by Parnthep V.K.Khaoyai. They rematched in a non-title fight on January 7, 2023, at the World Siam Stadium. Petchsamarn won the bout by decision.

On March 12, 2023 Petchsamarn faced Decho Por.Borirak at the Channel 7 Stadium. He won the fight by unanimous decision.

== Titles and accomplishments ==
- Rajadamnern Stadium
  - 2024 Rajadamnern Stadium Super Bantamweight (122 lbs) Champion
    - Four successful title defenses
- Channel 7 Boxing Stadium
  - 2021 Channel 7 Super Bantamweight (122 lbs) Champion

== Fight record ==
Muay Thai record
Date	Result	Opponent	Event	Location	Method	Round	Time
2026-10-17	Loss	(Thailand) Khunsueklek Boomdeksian	Rajadamnern World Series	Bangkok, Thailand	Decision (Unanimous)	3	3:00
2026-08-01	Win	(Thailand) Kaensak Jitmuangnon	Rajadamnern World Series, Rajadamnern Stadium	Bangkok, Thailand	Decision (Unanimous)	3	3:00
2026-04-25	Loss	(Thailand) Petchsila Wor.Auracha	Rajadamnern World Series	Bangkok, Thailand	KO (Knee)	2	1:04
For the vacant Rajadamnern Stadium Super Bantamweight (122 lbs) title.
2026-01-24	Win	(Thailand) Seeoui Singhmawynn	Rajadamnern World Series, Rajadamnern Stadium	Bangkok, Thailand	Decision (Unanimous)	5	3:00
2025-11-08	Win	(Canada) Aramiss Gadito	Rajadamnern World Series	Bangkok, Thailand	Decision (Unanimous)	3	3:00
2025-09-13	Loss	(Thailand) Petchsila Wor.Auracha	Rajadamnern World Series	Bangkok, Thailand	KO (Left hook)	2	2:59
Loses the Rajadamnern Stadium Super Bantamweight (122 lbs) title.
2025-08-03	Win	(Thailand) Kompetch Fairtex	Channel 7 Stadium	Bangkok, Thailand	Decision	5	3:00
2025-06-07	Win	(Thailand) Khunsueknoi Boomdeksian	Rajadamnern World Series	Bangkok, Thailand	Decision (Unanimous)	5	3:00
Defends the Rajadamnern Stadium Super Bantamweight (122 lbs) title.
2025-04-26	Win	(Thailand) Yodkatanyu Jitmuangnon	Rajadamnern World Series	Bangkok, Thailand	Decision (Unanimous)	5	3:00
Defends the Rajadamnern Stadium Super Bantamweight (122 lbs) title.
2025-01-25	Win	(Thailand) Petchsila Wor.Auracha	Rajadamnern World Series	Bangkok, Thailand	Decision (Unanimous)	5	3:00
Defends the Rajadamnern Stadium Super Bantamweight (122 lbs) title.
2024-12-07	Win	(Thailand) Rittidet Lookjaoporrongtom	Rajadamnern World Series	Bangkok, Thailand	Decision (Unanimous)	5	3:00
Defends the Rajadamnern Stadium Super Bantamweight (122 lbs) title.
2024-10-26	Loss	(Thailand) Yodkatanyu Jitmuangnon	Muay Thai Vithee TinThai + Kiatpetch, Chang International Circuit	Buriram province, Thailand	Decision	5	3:00
2024-06-15	Win	(Thailand) Petchpailin SorJor.Tongprachin	Rajadamnern World Series	Bangkok, Thailand	Decision (Unanimous)	5	3:00
Defends the Rajadamnern Stadium Super Bantamweight (122 lbs) title.
2024-05-18	Win	(Thailand) Parnthep V.K.Khaoyai	Rajadamnern World Series	Bangkok, Thailand	Decision (Unanimous)	5	3:00
Wins the vacant Rajadamnern Stadium Super Bantamweight (122 lbs) title.
2023-12-27	Win	(Thailand) Diesellek BuildJC	Rajadamnern Stadium 78th Birthday Show	Bangkok, Thailand	Decision	5	3:00
2023-09-03	Win	(Thailand) Diesellek BuildJC	Channel 7 Stadium	Bangkok, Thailand	Decision	5	3:00
2023-03-12	Win	(Thailand) Decho Por.Borirak	Channel 7 Stadium	Bangkok, Thailand	Decision	5	3:00
2023-01-07	Win	(Thailand) Parnthep V.K.Khaoyai	Chang MuayThai Kiatpetch Amarin Super Fight, World Siam Stadium	Bangkok, Thailand	Decision	5	3:00
2022-11-19	Win	(Thailand) Petchsansaeb Sor.Jor Tongprachin	Lumpinee Muay Thai TKO, Tawanna Bangkapi	Bangkok, Thailand	Decision	5	3:00
2022-05-08	Loss	(Thailand) Parnthep V.K.Khaoyai	Channel 7 Stadium	Bangkok, Thailand	Decision	5	3:00
Loses Channel 7 Stadium Super Bantamweight (122 lbs) title.
2022-02-15	Win	(Thailand) Phet Sawansangmanja	Lumpinee Stadium	Bangkok, Thailand	Decision	5	3:00
2021-12-12	Win	(Thailand) Petchmaeprik Fordpayakdaennua	Channel 7 Stadium	Bangkok, Thailand	Decision	5	3:00
Wins the vacant Channel 7 Stadium Super Bantamweight (122 lbs) title.
2021-03-14	Win	(Thailand) Ekwayu Mor.Krungthepthonburi	Chang Muay Thai Kiatpetch, Jitmuangnon Stadium	Nonthaburi, Thailand	Decision	5	3:00
2020-11-24	Loss	(Thailand) Phet Sawansangmanja	Kiatpetch, Lumpinee Stadium	Bangkok, Thailand	Decision	5	3:00
2020-10-09	Loss	(Thailand) Boonlong Petchyindee	Muaymanwansuk, Rangsit Stadium	Bangkok, Thailand	TKO (middle kick/arm injury)	2	
2020-08-29	Loss	(Thailand) Kompetch Sitsarawatsuer	Kiatpetch, OrTorGor.3 Stadium	Nonthaburi, Thailand	Decision	5	3:00
2020-07-27	Loss	(Thailand) Saoek Sitchefboontham	ChefBoontham, Thanakorn Stadium	Nakhon Pathom province, Thailand	Decision	5	3:00
2020-03-06	Loss	(Thailand) Chaila Por.Lakboon	Kiatpetch, Lumpinee Stadium	Bangkok, Thailand	Decision	5	3:00
2020-02-11	Loss	(Thailand) Prajanchai P.K.Saenchaimuaythaigym	P.K.Saenchai, Lumpinee Stadium	Bangkok, Thailand	Decision	5	3:00
For the vacant Lumpinee Stadium 122 lbs title
2020-01-14	Win	(Thailand) Puenkon Diamond98	Kiatpetch, Lumpinee Stadium	Bangkok, Thailand	Decision	5	3:00
2019-12-06	Loss	(Thailand) Prajanchai P.K.Saenchaimuaythaigym	Kiatpetch, Lumpinee Stadium	Bangkok, Thailand	Decision	5	3:00
2019-11-05	Win	(Thailand) Ronachai Tor.Ramintra	Kiatpetch, Lumpinee Stadium	Bangkok, Thailand	Decision	5	3:00
2019-10-08	Win	(Thailand) Kompetch Sitsarawatsuer	Kiatpetch, Lumpinee Stadium	Bangkok, Thailand	Decision	5	3:00
2019-09-06	Win	(Thailand) Chayakorn Por Lakboon	Kiatpetch, Rajadamnern Stadium	Bangkok, Thailand	Decision	5	3:00
2019-07-19	Win	(Thailand) Chokdee PK.Saenchaimuaythaigym	Muaymanwansuk + Kiatpetch, Lumpinee Stadium	Bangkok, Thailand	TKO (Doctor Stop/Cut)	3	
2019-06-16	Win	(Thailand) Ekwayu Mor.Krungthepthonburi	Chang Muay Thai Kiatpetch, Jitmuangnon Stadium	Nonthaburi, Thailand	Decision	5	3:00
2019-05-25	Win	(Thailand) Kangkawdaeng Huarongnakaeng	Lumpinee Muay Thai TKO, Lumpinee Stadium	Bangkok, Thailand	Decision	5	3:00
2019-03-16	Win	(Thailand) Saifon Rattanapanu	Lumpinee Muay Thai TKO, Lumpinee Stadium	Bangkok, Thailand	Decision	5	3:00
2019-02-10	Win	(Thailand) Sri-Uthai Sor.Jor.Piek-U-Thai	Chang Muay Thai Kiatpetch, Jitmuangnon Stadium	Nonthaburi, Thailand	TKO	4	
2018-08-25	Win	(Thailand) Saenpetch Kiathongyot	MAX MUAY THAI	Pattaya, Thailand	Decision	3	3:00
2017-12-11	Win	(Thailand) Yodphet Pangkonkrab		Surin province, Thailand	Decision	5	3:00
2017-11-17	Win	(Thailand) Mumum Or.Chanachai		Thailand	Decision	5	3:00
2017-08-18	Loss	(Thailand) Yimsiam Nakhonmueangdet	Muaymanwansuk, Rangsit Stadium	Pathum Thani, Thailand	Decision	5	3:00
2017-07-14	Loss	(Thailand) Ektoranin Mor.Krungthepthonburi	Muaymanwansuk, Rangsit Stadium	Pathum Thani, Thailand	KO	3	
2017-06-16	Win	(Thailand) Eakmongkol Nor.Anuwatgym	Muaymanwansuk, Rangsit Stadium	Pathum Thani, Thailand	Decision	5	3:00
2017-05-26	Win	(Thailand) Chatpayak Saksatun	Muaymanwansuk, Rangsit Stadium	Pathum Thani, Thailand	Decision	5	3:00
2017-04-07	Win	(Thailand) Saensak Sor.Boonyiam		Thailand	Decision	5	3:00
2017-03-10	Loss	(Thailand) Weeraponlek Wor.wanchai	Muaymanwansuk, Rangsit Stadium	Pathum Thani, Thailand	KO	2	
2017-02-07	Win	(Thailand) Yodsuwit Wor.Pairanan		Thailand	KO	4	
2017-01-18	Win	(Thailand) Fahmai Sor.Monpichit	Wan Kingthong, Rajadamnern Stadium	Bangkok, Thailand	KO	3	
2016-12-25	Loss	(Thailand) Petchnakin Wor.Sungpraphai	Rajadamnern Stadium	Bangkok, Thailand	Decision	5	3:00
2016-11-16	Loss	(Thailand) Khun Tor.Silapon		Thailand	KO	4	
2016-09-16	Win	(Thailand) Khawim Sor.Sommai	Muaymanwansuk, Rangsit Stadium	Pathum Thani, Thailand	Decision	5	3:00
2016-06-11	Win	(Thailand) Sita S.K.P.Muay Thai	Muaymanwansuk, Rangsit Stadium	Pathum Thani, Thailand	Decision	5	3:00
2016-04-13	Win	(Thailand) Pitchaya Big M Gym	Wanmeechai, Rajadamnern Stadium	Bangkok, Thailand	Decision	5	3:00
Legend: Win Loss Draw/No contest Notes
