= Prajanchai P.K.Saenchaimuaythaigym =

Thai Muay Thai professional fighter, kickboxer, and former boxer (born 1994)

Prajanchai P.K.Saenchai Muaythaigym
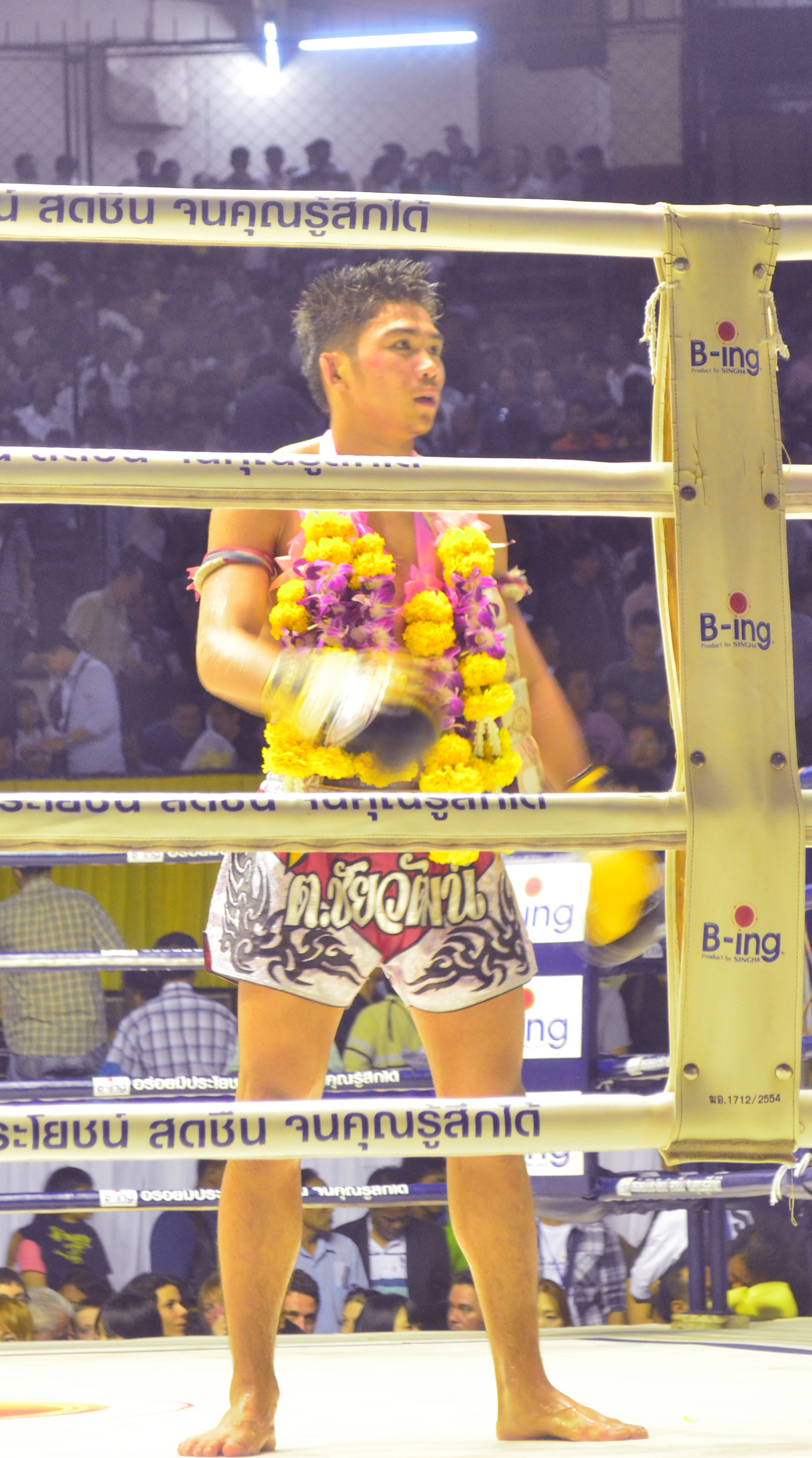
- Born: Nonthasit Phetnamthong; 16 October 1994 (age 32); Bangkok, Thailand
- Native name: นนทสิทธิ์ เพชรน้ำทอง
- Other names: Prajanchai Por.Phetnamtong; Prajanchai Klongsuanpluresort
- Height: 165 cm (5 ft 5 in)
- Division: Mini Flyweight; Light Flyweight; Flyweight; Bantamweight; Super Bantamweight
- Reach: 168 cm (66 in)
- Style: Muay Thai (Muay Femur); Boxing
- Stance: Orthodox
- Fighting out of: Bangkok, Thailand
- Team: P.K.Saenchai Muay Thai Gym
- Years active: c. 1999-present

Professional boxing record
- Total: 3
- Wins: 3

Kickboxing record
- Total: 397
- Wins: 340
- Losses: 54
- Draws: 3

Other information
- Boxing record from BoxRec

Nonthasit Phetnamthong (Thai: นนทสิทธิ์ เพชรน้ำทอง; born 16 October 1994), known professionally as Prajanchai P.K.Saenchai Muaythaigym (Thai: พระจันทร์ฉาย พี.เค.แสนชัยมวยไทยยิม) is a Thai professional Muay Thai fighter, kickboxer, and former boxer currently signed to ONE Championship. He is the reigning ONE Strawweight Muay Thai World Champion and former ONE Strawweight Kickboxing World Champion as well as a two-time Lumpinee Stadium champion and three-time Rajadamnern Stadium champion across four divisions.

Prajanchai also won a WBA Asia South Featherweight title. As of August 2024, he is the #8 ranked Bantamweight kickboxer by Beyond Kickboxing, the #7 ranked Flyweight kickboxer by Combat Press, and the #9 ranked P4P and #2 ranked Super Featherweight Muay Thai fighter by Combat Press.

== Boxing career ==
Prajanchai made his boxing debut on 29 August 2020, when he was scheduled to challenge the reigning WBA Asia South featherweight champion Arnon Yupang. Prajanchai won the fight by split decision, with scores of 96–94, 97–93 and 94–96.

In his second professional boxing bout, held on 31 October 2020, Prajanchai faced the former WBC Light Flyweight champion Kompayak Porpramook. He won the fight by unanimous decision, with all three judges awarding him all ten rounds of the bout.

Prajanchai was scheduled to face Suradech Ruhasiri on 24 April 2021. He won the fight by unanimous decision, once again taking all ten rounds on all the judges' scorecards.

== Titles and accomplishments ==
Muay Thai

- OneSongchai
  - 2012 S-1 Flyweight (112 lbs) Champion
- Rajadamnern Stadium
  - 2010 Rajadamnern Stadium Minimumweight (105 lbs) Champion
  - 2011 Rajadamnern Stadium Minimumweight (105 lbs) Champion
  - 2012 Rajadamnern Stadium Flyweight (112 lbs) Champion
- Lumpinee Stadium
  - 2014 Lumpinee Stadium Bantamweight (118 lbs) Champion
  - 2020 Lumpinee Stadium Super Bantamweight (122 lbs) Champion
- ONE Championship
  - ONE Strawweight Muay Thai World Champion (current)
    - One successful title defense (second reign)
  - 2023 interim ONE Strawweight Muay Thai World Champion
  - Performance of the Night (One-time) vs. Sam-A Gaiyanghadao
  - ONE Strawweight Kickboxing World Champion
    - (One time)

Boxing

- World Boxing Association
  - 2020 WBA Asia South Featherweight (126 lbs) Champion

== Professional boxing record ==
3 fights	3 wins	0 losses
By decision	3	0

No.	Result	Record	Opponent	Method	Round, time	Date	Location	Notes
3	Win	3–0	(Thailand) Suradech Ruhasiri	UD	10	24 April 2021	(Thailand) Suanlum Night Bazaar, Ratchadaphisek, Bangkok	
2	Win	2–0	(Thailand) Kompayak Porpramook	UD	10	31 October 2020	(Thailand) Suanlum Night Bazaar, Ratchadaphisek, Bangkok	
1	Win	1–0	(Thailand) Arnon Yupang	SD	10	29 August 2020	(Thailand) Suanlum Night Bazaar, Ratchadaphisek, Bangkok	Won WBA Asia South featherweight title

== Muay Thai and Kickboxing record ==
Muay Thai Record
Date	Result	Opponent	Event	Location	Method	Round	Time
2026-12-18		(Malaysia) Aliff Sor.Dechapan	ONE The Inner Circle 43	Bangkok, Thailand			
Defending the ONE Strawweight Muay Thai World Championship.
2026-10-16	Loss	(China) Wang Junguang	ONE The Inner Circle 35, Lumpinee Stadium	Bangkok, Thailand	Decision (split)	3	3:00
2025-10-03	Loss	(Canada) Jonathan Di Bella	ONE Fight Night 36	Bangkok, Thailand	Decision (Unanimous)	5	3:00
Loses the ONE Strawweight Kickboxing World Championship.
2025-02-08	Win	(United Kingdom) Ellis Barboza	ONE Fight Night 28	Bangkok, Thailand	TKO (doctor stoppage)	4	1:55
Defends the ONE Strawweight Muay Thai World Championship.
2024-06-28	Win	(Canada) Jonathan Di Bella	ONE Friday Fights 68	Bangkok, Thailand	Decision (Unanimous)	5	3:00
Wins the ONE Strawweight Kickboxing World Championship.
2023-12-22	Win	(Italy) Joseph Lasiri	ONE Friday Fights 46	Bangkok, Thailand	KO (elbow)	1	1:28
Won and unified the ONE Strawweight Muay Thai World Championship.
2023-09-22	Win	(Algeria) Akram Hamidi	ONE Friday Fights 34, Lumpinee Stadium	Bangkok, Thailand	Decision (Unanimous)	3	3:00
2023-06-23	Win	(Thailand) Sam-A Gaiyanghadao	ONE Friday Fights 22, Lumpinee Stadium	Bangkok, Thailand	KO (Right elbow)	2	2:10
Wins the interim ONE Strawweight Muay Thai World Championship.
2023-01-20	Win	(Thailand) Kompetch Sitsarawatsuer	ONE Friday Fights 1, Lumpinee Stadium	Bangkok, Thailand	Decision (Unanimous)	3	5:00
2022-05-20	Loss	(Italy) Joseph Lasiri	ONE 157	Kallang, Singapore	TKO (Retirement)	3	3:00
Lost the ONE Strawweight Muay Thai World Championship.
2021-07-30	Win	(Thailand) Sam-A Gaiyanghadao	ONE Championship: Battleground	Kallang, Singapore	Decision (Majority)	5	3:00
Wins the ONE Strawweight Muay Thai World Championship.
2021-03-28	Win	(Thailand) Ronachai Tor.Ramintra	Channel 7 Stadium	Bangkok, Thailand	Decision (Unanimous)	5	3:00
2020-12-08	Win	(Thailand) Kompetch Sitsarawatsuer	Lumpinee Birthday Show, Lumpinee Stadium	Bangkok, Thailand	Decision	5	3:00
2020-10-05	Loss	(Thailand) Kompetch Sitsarawatsuer	R1 UFA, World Siam Stadium	Bangkok, Thailand	Decision	5	3:00
2020-02-11	Win	(Thailand) Petchsamarn Sor.Samarngarment	Lumpinee Stadium	Bangkok, Thailand	Decision	5	3:00
Wins the vacant Lumpinee Stadium Super Bantamweight (122 lbs) title.
2019-12-06	Win	(Thailand) Petchsamarn Sor.Samarngarment	Lumpinee Stadium	Bangkok, Thailand	Decision	5	3:00
2019-11-02	Draw	(Thailand) Sprinter Pangkongprab	Maximum Muay Thai Fight	Brazil, São Paulo	Decision	5	3:00
2018-05-15	Win	(Thailand) Worawute Baovigym	Lumpinee Stadium	Bangkok, Thailand	KO (Elbow)	3	
2018-03-28	Loss	(Thailand) Chalam Parunchai	WanParunchai + Poonseua Sanjorn	Nakhon Si Thammarat, Thailand	Decision	5	3:00
2018-01-24	Win	(Thailand) Morakot Phetsimuen	Rajadamnern Stadium	Bangkok, Thailand	Decision	5	3:00
2017-12-15	Win	(Thailand) Morakot Phetsimuen	Lumpinee Stadium	Bangkok, Thailand	Decision	5	3:00
2017-11-14	Win	(Thailand) Sprinter Pangkongprab	Lumpinee Stadium	Bangkok, Thailand	Decision	5	3:00
2017-09-05	Win	(Thailand) Ronachai Tor.Ramintra	Lumpinee Stadium	Bangkok, Thailand	Decision	5	3:00
2017-08-03	Win	(Thailand) Kiewpayak Jitmuangnon	Rajadamnern Stadium	Bangkok, Thailand	Decision	5	3:00
2017-06-07	Loss	(Thailand) Morakot Phetsimuen	Rajadamnern Stadium	Bangkok, Thailand	Decision	5	3:00
2017-03-30	Win	(Thailand) Puenkon Tor.Surat	Rajadamnern Stadium	Bangkok, Thailand	Decision	5	3:00
2017-02-08	Loss	(Thailand) Puenkon Tor.Surat	Rajadamnern Stadium	Bangkok, Thailand	Decision	5	3:00
2017-01-12	Win	(Thailand) Yodmungkol Muangsima	Rajadamnern Stadium	Bangkok, Thailand	Decision	5	3:00
2016-09-30	Loss	(Thailand) Sing Parunchai	Lumpinee Stadium	Bangkok, Thailand	Decision	5	3:00
2016-07-21	Win	(Thailand) Sing Parunchai	Rajadamnern Stadium	Bangkok, Thailand	Decision	5	3:00
2016-05-22	Loss	(Thailand) Luknimit Singklongsi	Rajadamnern Stadium	Bangkok, Thailand	Decision	5	3:00
2016-04-29	Loss	(Thailand) Chalam Parunchai	Lumpinee Stadium	Bangkok, Thailand	Decision	5	3:00
2016-03-31	Loss	(Thailand) Luknimit Singklongsi	Rajadamnern Stadium	Bangkok, Thailand	Decision	5	3:00
2016-03-04	Loss	(Thailand) Chalam Parunchai	Lumpinee Stadium	Bangkok, Thailand	Decision	5	3:00
2015-12-23	Win	(Thailand) Phetnamngam Aor.Kwanmuang	Rajadamnern Stadium	Bangkok, Thailand	Decision	5	3:00
2015-12-06	Win	(Japan) Toma	The Battle of Muaythai 10～ The 10th anniversary	Yokohama, Japan	Decision (Unanimous)	5	3:00
2015-10-14	Win	(Thailand) Yodmongkol Tor.Laksong	Rajadamnern Stadium	Bangkok, Thailand	Decision	5	3:00
2015-09-05	Win	(Thailand) Yardfar R-Airline	Montri Studio	Thailand	Decision	5	3:00
2015-08-07	Win	(Thailand) Phet Sawansangmanja	Lumpinee Stadium	Bangkok, Thailand	Decision	5	3:00
2015-07-02	Win	(Thailand) Kengkla Por.Pekko	Rajadamnern Stadium	Bangkok, Thailand	Decision	5	3:00
2015-05-28	Win	(Thailand) Chorfah Tor.Sangtiennoi	Rajadamnern Stadium	Bangkok, Thailand	Decision	5	3:00
2015-05-07	Loss	(Thailand) Yodmungkol Muangsima	Rajadamnern Stadium	Bangkok, Thailand	Decision	5	3:00
2015-03-30	Draw	(Thailand) Chorfah Tor.Sangtiennoi	Rajadamnern Stadium	Bangkok, Thailand	Decision	5	3:00
2015-02-12	Win	(Thailand) Luknimit Singklongsi	Rajadamnern Stadium	Bangkok, Thailand	Decision	5	3:00
2015-01-08	Win	(Thailand) Lamnapong Yuthachonburi	Rajadamnern Stadium	Bangkok, Thailand	KO	4	
2014-12-09	Loss	(Thailand) Panpayak Jitmuangnon	Lumpinee Stadium	Bangkok, Thailand	Decision	5	3:00
Lost the Lumpinee Stadium Bantamweight (118 lbs) title.
2014-10-08	Loss	(Thailand) Luknimit Singklongsi	Rajadamnern Stadium	Bangkok, Thailand	Decision	5	3:00
2014-09-05	Win	(Thailand) Panpayak Jitmuangnon	Lumpinee Stadium	Bangkok, Thailand	Decision	5	3:00
Wins the Lumpinee Stadium Bantamweight (118 lbs) title.
2014-08-14	Win	(Thailand) Chorfah Tor.Sangtiennoi	Rajadamnern Stadium	Bangkok, Thailand	Decision	5	3:00
2014-07-16	Win	(Thailand) Maethee Sorjortoipadriw	Rajadamnern Stadium	Bangkok, Thailand	Decision	5	3:00
2014-05-07	Win	(Thailand) Pichitchai P.K.Saenchaimuaythaigym	Rajadamnern Stadium	Bangkok, Thailand	Decision	5	3:00
2014-02-28	Loss	(Thailand) Mondam Sor.Weerapon	Lumpinee Stadium	Bangkok, Thailand	Decision	5	3:00
2014-01-07	Win	(Thailand) Mondam Sor.Weerapon	Lumpinee Stadium	Bangkok, Thailand	Decision	5	3:00
2013-12-03	Win	(Thailand) Eakmongkol Kaiyanghadaogym	Lumpinee Stadium	Bangkok, Thailand	Decision	5	3:00
2013-11-06	Win	(Thailand) Yodmongkon Muangseema	Rajadamnern Stadium	Bangkok, Thailand	Decision	5	3:00
2013-07-09	Win	(Thailand) Wanchalong PK.Saenchai	Lumpinee Stadium	Bangkok, Thailand	Decision	5	3:00
2013-06-03	Loss	(Thailand) Yokpet Sompongmataput	Lumpinee Stadium	Bangkok, Thailand	Decision	5	3:00
2013-04-05	Loss	(Thailand) Sangmanee Sor Tienpo	Lumpinee Stadium	Bangkok, Thailand	Decision	5	3:00
2013-02-21	Win	(Thailand) Dang Sor.Ploenchit	Rajadamnern Stadium	Bangkok, Thailand	Decision	5	3:00
2012-12-24	Win	(Thailand) Lamnampong Noomjeantawana	Rajadamnern Stadium	Bangkok, Thailand	Decision	5	3:00
2012-11-09	Loss	(Thailand) Sangmanee Sor Tienpo	Lumpinee Stadium	Bangkok, Thailand	Decision	5	3:00
Lost the Rajadamnern Stadium Flyweight (112 lbs) title.
2012-10-11	Win	(Thailand) Densiam Aikbangzai	Rajadamnern Stadium	Bangkok, Thailand	Decision	5	3:00
Wins the S-1 World Flyweight (112 lbs) title.
2012-09-12	Win	(Thailand) Palangpon WatcharachaiGym	Rajadamnern Stadium	Bangkok, Thailand	Decision	5	3:00
2012-06-26	Win	(Thailand) Pampun Kiatchongkao	Lumpinee Stadium	Bangkok, Thailand	Decision	5	3:00
2012-05-17	Win	(Thailand) Meethee Kiatpratoom	Rajadamnern Stadium	Bangkok, Thailand	Decision	5	3:00
Wins the vacant Rajadamnern Stadium Flyweight (112 lbs) title.
2012-04-19	Win	(Thailand) Meethee Kiatpratoom	Rajadamnern Stadium	Bangkok, Thailand	Decision	5	3:00
2012-03-15	Win	(Thailand) Yardfar R-Airline	Rajadamnern Stadium	Bangkok, Thailand	Decision	5	3:00
2012-01-26	Win	(Thailand) Nguern Jitmuangnon	Rajadamnern Stadium	Bangkok, Thailand	Decision	5	3:00
2011-12-08	Loss	(Thailand) Meethee Kiatpratoom	Rajadamnern Stadium	Bangkok, Thailand	Decision	5	3:00
2011-09-08	Win	(Thailand) Tuan Kor.Kampanart	Rajadamnern Stadium	Bangkok, Thailand	Decision	5	3:00
2011-08-18	Loss	(Thailand) Detkart Por.Pongsawang	Rajadamnern Stadium	Bangkok, Thailand	Decision	5	3:00
For the Rajadamnern Stadium Light Flyweight (108 lbs) title.
2011-07-21	Win	(Thailand) Lomtalay Sitsoung	Rajadamnern Stadium	Bangkok, Thailand	Decision	5	3:00
2011-06-02	Win	(Thailand) Detkart Por.Pongsawang	Rajadamnern Stadium	Bangkok, Thailand	Decision	5	3:00
2011-04-25	Loss	(Thailand) Detkart Por.Pongsawang	Rajadamnern Stadium	Bangkok, Thailand	Decision	5	3:00
Loses the Rajadamnern Stadium Mini Flyweight (105 lbs) title.
2011-02-21	Win	(Thailand) Tee-Us Kor.Rachada	Rajadamnern Stadium	Bangkok, Thailand	Decision	5	3:00
Wins the vacant Rajadamnern Stadium Mini Flyweight (105 lbs) title.
2011-01-20	Loss	(Thailand) Tee-Us Kor.Rachada	Rajadamnern Stadium	Bangkok, Thailand	Decision	5	3:00
2010-12-15	Win	(Thailand) Yodthongthai Tor.Mahahin	Rajadamnern Stadium	Bangkok, Thailand	Decision	5	3:00
2010-11-18	Win	(Thailand) Sanchai Sitsarawat-G	Rajadamnern Stadium	Bangkok, Thailand	Decision	5	3:00
2010-10-21	Loss	(Thailand) Superbank Mor Ratanabandit	Rajadamnern Stadium	Bangkok, Thailand	Decision	5	3:00
For a side-bet of 800,000 baht.
2010-09-15	Loss	(Thailand) Superbank Mor Ratanabandit	Rajadamnern Stadium	Bangkok, Thailand	Decision	5	3:00
Loses the Rajadamnern Stadium Mini Flyweight (105 lbs) title.
2010-08-19	Win	(Thailand) Daolookai Kiatpratoom	Rajadamnern Stadium	Bangkok, Thailand	Decision	5	3:00
2010-07-15	Win	(Thailand) Tiankao Tor.Sangtiennoi	Rajadamnern Stadium	Bangkok, Thailand	Decision	5	3:00
2010-06-10	Win	(Thailand) Tiankao Tor.Sangtiennoi	Rajadamnern Stadium	Bangkok, Thailand	Decision	5	3:00
Wins the vacant Rajadamnern Stadium Light Flyweight (105 lbs) title.
2010-05-13	Win	(Thailand) Mondam Sor.Weerapon	Lumpinee Stadium	Bangkok, Thailand	Decision	5	3:00
2010-04-06	Loss	(Thailand) Petpanomrung Kiatmuu9	Petchyindee Fights, Lumpinee Stadium	Bangkok, Thailand	Decision	5	3:00
2010-03-11	Loss	(Thailand) Chaidet Sor.Suriya	Lumpinee Stadium	Bangkok, Thailand	Decision	5	3:00
2010-02-11	Win	(Thailand) Yodthongthai Tor.Mahahin	Rajadamnern Stadium	Bangkok, Thailand	Decision	5	3:00
2010-01-14	Win	(Thailand) Superbank Mor Ratanabandit	Rajadamnern Stadium	Bangkok, Thailand	Decision	5	3:00
2009-12-10	Loss	(Thailand) Yodthongthai Tor.Mahahin	Rajadamnern Stadium	Bangkok, Thailand	Decision	5	3:00
2009-11-05	Win	(Thailand) Anuwatlek Por.Telakun	Rajadamnern Stadium	Bangkok, Thailand	Decision	5	3:00
2009-10-08	Draw	(Thailand) Anuwatlek Por.Telakun	Rajadamnern Stadium	Bangkok, Thailand	Decision	5	3:00
2009-09-17	Win	(Thailand) Jomyuthjiew Wor.Rungtavee	Rajadamnern Stadium	Bangkok, Thailand	Decision	5	3:00
2009-08-27	Win	(Thailand) Daolookai Kiatpratoom	Rajadamnern Stadium	Bangkok, Thailand	Decision	5	3:00
2009-08-06	Win	(Thailand) Petrajan FA.Group	Rajadamnern Stadium	Bangkok, Thailand	Decision	5	3:00
2009-06-18	Win	(Thailand) Petdam Petnoppakao	Rajadamnern Stadium	Bangkok, Thailand	Decision	5	3:00
2009-05-28	Win	(Thailand) Tiankao Tor.Sangtiennoi	Rajadamnern Stadium	Bangkok, Thailand	Decision	5	3:00
2009-05-07	Loss	(Thailand) Tiankao Tor.Sangtiennoi	Rajadamnern Stadium	Bangkok, Thailand	Decision	5	3:00
2009-04-09	Win	(Thailand) Fahsai Sitsangluanglek	Rajadamnern Stadium	Bangkok, Thailand	Decision	5	3:00
2009-02-26	Win	(Thailand) Fahsai Sitsangluanglek	Rajadamnern Stadium	Bangkok, Thailand	Decision	5	3:00
2009-02-05	Win	(Thailand) Wanmechai Sor.Kongkaderd	Rajadamnern Stadium	Bangkok, Thailand	Decision	5	3:00
2009-01-08	Loss	(Thailand) Wanmechai Sor.Kongkaderd	Rajadamnern Stadium	Bangkok, Thailand	Decision	5	3:00
2008-12-18	Win	(Thailand) Petanun Chor.Tiangtum	Rajadamnern Stadium	Bangkok, Thailand	Decision	5	3:00
Legend: Win Loss Draw/No contest Notes
