= Yodsila Chor.Hapayak =

Thai Muay Thai fighter

Yodsila
- Born: Teerawat Chanklang; April 1, 2001 (age 25); Nakhon Ratchasima province, Thailand
- Other names: Yodsila Por.Boonsit (ยอดศิลา ภ.บุญสิทธิ์); Yodnakrob Por.Boonsit (ยอดนักรบ ภ.บุญสิทธิ์); Yossila Chor.Hapayak (ヨーシラー・チョー.ハーパヤック)
- Height: 169 cm (5 ft 7 in)
- Weight: 53 kg (117 lb; 8.3 st)
- Style: Muay Tae
- Stance: Southpaw
- Fighting out of: Bangkok, Thailand
- Team: Chor.Hapayak
- Trainer: Ruenpae Sor.Thamarangsri

Yodsila Chor.Hapayak (ยอดศิลา ช.ห้าพยัคฆ์) is a Thai Muay Thai fighter.

As of April 2023 he was the #6 ranked -53 kg kickboxer in the world by Beyond Kick.

== Career ==
Yodsila took part in the 9th annual Maabin Tournament throughout 2021. He reached the final where he was scheduled to face Kanchai Jitmuangnon on December 25, 2021. He won the fight by knockout in the fourth round and took home the 600,000 baht cash prize.

On May 15, 2022, Yodsila faced Chokdee PK.Saenchaimuaythaigym at Rajadamnern stadium, he won by decision. An immediate rematch was scheduled for the next month by the Palangmai promotion. Yodsila won once again by decision.

On July 25, 2022, Yodsila avenged his only loss of the two previous years when he defeated Aithipon Singmawynn by decision at the Don Muang Royal Thai Air Force Base for the Palangmai promotion. On September, 24 2022 Yodsila pushed his winning streak to 12 in a row when he defeated Mahasamut Moopingaroijunbei by decision.

Yodsila was part of the 2022 K-1 Bantamweight World Grand Prix for the inaugural K-1 -53 kg title. He was booked to face Toma Kuroda in the quarterfinals of the tournament, which was held at K-1 World GP 2022 in Osaka on December 3, 2022. The fight was ruled a split decision draw after the first three rounds. Yodsila lost by unanimous decision following the extra fourth round.

Yodsila scored his best win yet when he defeated Phetsommai Sor.Sommai by decision on January 23, 2023, at Thupatemi Stadium. Following this success Yodsila entered the top 5 in the 118 lbs division according to the WMO.

Yodsila faced Issei Ishii at K-1 World GP 2023: K'Festa 6 on March 12, 2023. Originally a unanimous decision win for Yodsila, the bout was changed to a technical draw after. The second round knockdown Yodsila scored being considered against the rules as it followed an illegal kick catch. The bout was rejudged without taking consideration of the second round and was declared a majority draw.

== Titles and accomplishments ==
- Siam Omnoi Stadium
  - 2021 Maabin Tournament Winner

== Fight record ==
Muay Thai and Kickboxing Record
65 Wins (14 (T)KOs), 24 Losses, 4 Draws
Date	Result	Opponent	Event	Location	Method	Round	Time
2026-06-03	Loss	(Thailand) Yokkiri T.N Muaythai	Palangmai, Rajadamnern Stadium	Bangkok, Thailand	Decision	5	3:00
2026-05-06	Loss	(Thailand) Chusap Sor.Salacheep	Palangmai, Rajadamnern Stadium	Bangkok, Thailand	Decision	5	3:00
2025-08-30	Loss	(Thailand) Chusap Sor.Salacheep	Omnoi Stadium	Samut Sakhon, Thailand	Decision	5	3:00
2025-07-25	Loss	(Thailand) Teeyai PK Saenchai	ONE Friday Fights 117, Lumpinee Stadium	Bangkok, Thailand	KO (Right cross)	3	0:19
2025-04-16	Win	(Thailand) Petchchaophraya Sit KamnanNeng	Palangmai, Rajadamnern Stadium	Bangkok, Thailand	TKO (injury)	2	
2024-08-19	Win	(Thailand) Paeyim Sor.Boonmeerit	Muay Thai Pantamit, Thupatemi Stadium	Pathum Thani, Thailand	Decision	5	3:00
2024-07-24	Win	(Thailand) Jao-insee Kiatcharoenchai	Palangmai, Rajadamnern Stadium	Bangkok, Thailand	Decision	5	3:00
2023-09-28	Loss	(Thailand) Rittidet Chor.Wimonsin	Wan Ittipon Mahasakun, Rajadamnern Stadium	Bangkok, Thailand	Decision	5	3:00
2023-08-07	Loss	(Thailand) Rittidet Chor.Wimonsin	Muay Thai Pantamit, Thupatemi Stadium	Pathum Thani province, Thailand	Decision	5	3:00
2023-05-28	Loss	(Thailand) Numsurin Chor.Ketwina	ONE Friday Fights 14, Lumpinee Stadium	Bangkok, Thailand	Decision (Unanimous)	3	3:00
2023-03-12	Draw	(Japan) Issei Ishii	K-1 World GP 2023: K'Festa 6	Tokyo, Japan	Technical draw (Majority)	3	3:00
2023-01-23	Win	(Thailand) Phetsommai Sor.Sommai	Muay Thai Pantamit, Thupatemi Stadium	Pathum Thani, Thailand	Decision	5	3:00
2022-12-03	Loss	(Japan) Toma Kuroda	K-1 World GP 2022 in Osaka Bantamweight World Grand Prix, Quarter Final	Osaka, Japan	Ext.R Decision (Unanimous)	4	3:00
2022-10-22	Loss	(Thailand) Seeoui Singmawynn	Lumpinee Champion Krikkrai	Thailand	Decision	5	3:00
2022-09-24	Win	(Thailand) Mahasamut Moopingaroijunbei	Lumpinee Muay Thai TKO, Tawanna Bangkapi	Bangkok, Thailand	KO (Punches)	2	
2022-07-25	Win	(Thailand) Aithipon Singmawynn	Palangmai, Don Muang Royal Thai Air Force Base	Bangkok, Thailand	Decision	5	3:00
2022-06-22	Win	(Thailand) Chokdee PK.Saenchaimuaythaigym	Muay Thai Palangmai, Rajadamnern Stadium	Bangkok, Thailand	Decision	5	3:00
2022-05-18	Win	(Thailand) Chokdee PK.Saenchaimuaythaigym	Muay Thai Palangmai, Rajadamnern Stadium	Bangkok, Thailand	Decision	5	3:00
2022-04-06	Win	(Thailand) Pataksiam SinbiMuayThai	Sor.Sommai, Rajadamnern Stadium	Bangkok, Thailand	Decision	5	3:00
2022-02-12	Win	(Thailand) Pangtor Por.Lakboon	Suek Jao Muay Thai, Omnoi Stadium	Samut Prakan, Thailand	Decision	5	3:00
2021-12-25	Win	(Thailand) Kanchai Jitmuangnon	Suek Jao Muay Thai, Omnoi Stadium - Maabin Tournament Final	Samut Prakan, Thailand	KO (Knee to the body)	4	
Wins the 9th Maabin Tournament and the ฿600,000 Grand Prize
2021-11-13	Win	(Thailand) Kongfah Sor.Aumaporn	Suek Jao Muay Thai, Omnoi Stadium - Maabin Tournament Semi Final	Samut Prakan, Thailand	Decision	5	3:00
2021-09-18	Win	(Thailand) Inseedam Suanaharnpeekmai	Suek Jao Muay Thai, Omnoi Stadium	Samut Prakan, Thailand	Decision	5	3:00
2021-04-10	Win	(Thailand) Chalamdam SunKilaNamaiphai	Suek Jao Muay Thai, Omnoi Stadium	Samut Prakan, Thailand	Decision	5	3:00
2021-03-17	Win	(Thailand) Phetnumchai Mor.MuangKhonDee	Sor.Sommai, Rajadamnern Stadium	Bangkok, Thailand	Decision	5	3:00
2020-11-09	Win	(Thailand) Numsurin Chor Ketweena	Chef Boontham, Rangsit Stadium	Pathum Thani, Thailand	Decision	5	3:00
2020-10-01	Loss	(Thailand) Aithipon Singmawynn	Singmawynn, Rajadamnern Stadium	Bangkok, Thailand	Decision	5	3:00
2020-09-02	Win	(Thailand) Petchsaenkhom TheBestMuayThai	Palangmai, Rajadamnern Stadium	Bangkok, Thailand	Decision	5	3:00
2020-07-30	Loss	(Thailand) Petchmuangpan Bamrungsit	Sor.Thanapol, Rajadamnern Stadium	Bangkok, Thailand	KO	4	
2020-03-14	Win	(Thailand) Dinnuathong Muatpong191	OneSongchai, Thanakorn Stadium	Nakhon Pathom, Thailand	Decision	5	3:00
2020-01-23	Win	(Thailand) SaenEk NumBangkradee	Chef Boontham, Rajadamnern Stadium	Bangkok, Thailand	Decision	5	3:00
2019-12-03	Win	(Thailand) Chaimongkol Mor.RajabahtMubanchomBueng	Phetsupan, Lumpinee Stadium	Bangkok, Thailand	KO (Body kicks)	3	
2019-10-17	Loss	(Thailand) Sakaengam Jitmuangnon	Rajadamnern Stadium	Bangkok, Thailand	Decision	5	3:00
2019-08-18	Loss	(Thailand) Petchmueang Nuisimummuang	Muay Dee Withithai, Blue Arena	Samut Prakan, Thailand	Decision	5	3:00
2019-05-21	Loss	(Thailand) Aitirit Sitkruchaidej	Lumpinee Stadium	Bangkok, Thailand	Decision	5	3:00
2019-04-07	Loss	(Thailand) Sakaengam Jitmuangnon	Muay Dee Withithai, Blue Arena	Samut Prakan, Thailand	Decision	5	3:00
2019-03-07	Win	(Thailand) Orono Chor.Phetmueangkhon	Jitmuangnon, Rajadamnern Stadium	Bangkok, Thailand	KO	3	
2018-12-23	Loss	(Thailand) Sornparam Nor.Narisorn	Muay Dee Withithai, Blue Arena	Samut Prakan, Thailand	Decision	5	3:00
2018-12-02	Draw	(Thailand) Yodmalay Phetjaroenvit	Muay Dee Withithai, Blue Arena	Samut Prakan, Thailand	Decision	5	3:00
2018-10-04	Win	(Thailand) Yodmalay Phetjaroenvit	Jitmuangnon, Rajadamnern Stadium	Bangkok, Thailand	Decision	5	3:00
2018-09-02	Win	(Thailand) Padejsuk Jor.Nopparat	Muay Dee Withithai, Blue Arena	Samut Prakan, Thailand	Decision	5	3:00
2018-06-10	Loss	(Thailand) Ployrungphet Tded99	Channel 7 Stadium	Bangkok, Thailand	Decision	5	3:00
2018-04-27	Win	(Thailand) Robert Sor.Tanabawon	Kiatpetch, Lumpinee Stadium	Bangkok, Thailand	Decision	5	3:00
2018-02-04	Win	(Thailand) Rak Erawan	Kiatpetch, Lumpinee Stadium	Bangkok, Thailand	Decision	5	3:00
Legend: Win Loss Draw/No contest Notes
