= Petchthailand Moopingaroijung =

Japanese kickboxer and Muay Thai fighter

Petchthailand
- Born: Kiartbandit Peunbon; August 15, 2001 (age 25); Surin province, Thailand
- Other names: Petchthailand Mor.RajabhatSurin (เพชรไทยแลนด์ ม.ราชภัฎสุรินทร์); Petchthailand Yodmuayphonrat (เพชรไทยแลนด์ ยอดมวยพลรัตน์); PetchThailand Or.Kitkasem
- Height: 1.68 m (5 ft 6 in)
- Weight: 56 kg (123 lb; 8.8 st)
- Division: Mini Flyweight; Light Flyweight; Flyweight; Super Flyweight; Bantamweight; Super Bantamweight; Featherweight
- Style: Muay Thai
- Stance: Orthodox
- Fighting out of: Surin province, Thailand
- Team: Mor.Rajabath Surin

Petchthailand (เพชรไทยแลนด์) is a Thai Muay Thai fighter and current WMO Featherweight World Champion.

For the November 2024 rankings, Combat Press ranked him the number 4 Muay Thai featherweight(126 pounds, 58 kilograms).

== Championships and accomplishments ==
- World Muaythai Organization
  - 2024 WMO World Featherweight (126 lbs) Champion
- True4U/Pryde TV
  - 2025 Pryde TV Super Bantamweight (122 lbs) Champion
  - 2020 True4U Bantamweight (118 lbs) Champion
  - 2018 True4U Mini Flyweight (105 lbs) Champion
- World Boxing Council Muaythai
  - 2019 WBC Muay Thai World Super Flyweight Champion
- International Boxing Federation
  - 2019 IBF Muay Thai World Super Flyweight Champion

== Fight record ==
Muay Thai record
Date	Result	Opponent	Event	Location	Method	Round	Time
2026-11-19	Loss	(Thailand) Saoek Or.Atchariya	Petchyindee, Rajadamnern Stadium	Bangkok, Thailand	Decision	5	3:00
2026-08-02	Win	(Thailand) Peemai Erawan	TorNamThai Kiatpetch TKO, Rajadamnern Stadium	Bangkok, Thailand	KO	2	
2026-06-11	Loss	(Thailand) Teerapong Dabthitbangrak	Petchyindee, Rajadamnern Stadium	Bangkok, Thailand	KO	2	
Loses the Pryde TV Super Bantamweight title.
2026-05-04	Win	(Thailand) Petchsongley Bor.Rungrot	Muaymansananmuang	Chonburi province, Thailand	Decision	5	3:00
2026-02-26	Loss	(Thailand) Teerapong Dabthitbangrak	Petchyindee, Rajadamnern Stadium	Bangkok, Thailand	Decision	5	3:00
2026-01-15	Win	(Thailand) Detpetch PetchyindeeAcademy	Petchyindee, Rajadamnern Stadium	Bangkok, Thailand	KO	2	
Wins the vacant Pryde TV Super Bantamweight title.
2025-10-30	Win	(Thailand) Chaitone Wor.Auracha	Petchyindee, Rajadamnern Stadium	Bangkok, Thailand	Decision	5	3:00
2025-10-02	Win	(Thailand) Saotho Or.Atchariya	Petchyindee, Rajadamnern Stadium	Bangkok, Thailand	Decision	5	3:00
2025-09-04	Win	(Thailand) Jaguar PetchyindeeAcademy	Petchyindee, Rajadamnern Stadium	Bangkok, Thailand	Decision	5	3:00
2025-07-24	Loss	(Thailand) Detchaiya PetchyindeeAcademy	Petchyindee, Rajadamnern Stadium	Bangkok, Thailand	Decision	5	3:00
2025-04-10	Loss	(Thailand) Seeoui Singmawynn	Petchyindee, Rajadamnern Stadium	Bangkok, Thailand	Decision	5	3:00
2025-03-02	Win	(Thailand) Pongsiri Sujibameekeaw	Muaydeewithithai, Thupatemi stadium	Pathum Thani, Thailand	Decision	5	3:00
2024-12-17	Loss	(Thailand) Dechaiya PetchyindeeAcademy	Petchyindee, Rajadamnern Stadium	Bangkok, Thailand	Decision	5	3:00
2024-11-28	Win	(Thailand) Nueng Erawan	Petchyindee, Rajadamnern Stadium - Hadao Ngernlan tournament	Bangkok, Thailand	Decision	5	3:00
2024-09-26	Win	(Thailand) Boonlong KlongsuanpluResort	Petchyindee, Rajadamnern Stadium	Bangkok, Thailand	Decision	5	3:00
2024-08-22	Loss	(Thailand) Diesellek PetchyindeeAcademy	Petchyindee, Rajadamnern Stadium	Bangkok, Thailand	Decision	5	3:00
2024-07-28	Win	(Japan) Hirohito Takizawa	JKA "Kick Insist 19"	Tokyo, Japan	Decision (Split)	5	3:00
Wins the vacant WMO World Featherweight title.
2024-07-11	Win	(Thailand) Petchnamchok Sor.Jaruwan	Petchyindee, Rajadamnern Stadium	Bangkok, Thailand	TKO (Kicks)	4	
2024-05-19	Win	(Thailand) Lukkwan Sujibamigiew	Muaydee VitheeThai, Jitmuangnon Stadium	Nonthaburi province, Thailand	Decision	5	3:00
2024-04-19	Win	(Thailand) Lukkwan Sujibamigiew	Muaymanwansuk, Rangsit Stadium	Pathum Thani, Thailand	Decision	5	3:00
2024-02-13	Loss	(Thailand) Boonlong KlongsuanpluResort	Muaymansananmuang Mahasarakham	Maha Sarakham province, Thailand	Decision	5	3:00
2023-12-31	Loss	(Thailand) Chartpayak Saksatun	Channel 7 Muay Thai	Bangkok, Thailand	Decision	5	3:00
2023-11-26	Win	(Japan) Hirohito Takizawa	JKA "Kick Insist 17"	Tokyo, Japan	Decision (Majority)	3	3:00
2023-11-05	Win	(Thailand) Ratchadet Sor.Petchjarat	TorNamThai RuamponkonSamui Kiatpetch, Rajadamnern Stadium	Bangkok, Thailand	Decision	5	3:00
2023-09-26	Loss	(Thailand) Petchsansaeb SorJor.Tongprachin	Muaymansananmuang, Rangsit Stadium	Pathum Thani, Thailand	Decision	5	3:00
2023-09-01	Win	(Thailand) Petchnamnueng Tor.Surat	Muaymanwansuk, Rangsit Stadium	Pathum Thani, Thailand	Decision	5	3:00
2023-05-23	Win	(Thailand) Pirapat Muayded789	Muaymansananmuang, Rangsit Stadium	Pathum Thani, Thailand	Decision	5	3:00
2023-05-02	Win	(Thailand) Petchsithong Sor.Saknarin	Muaymansananmuang, Rangsit Stadium	Pathum Thani, Thailand	Decision	5	3:00
2023-02-28	Win	(Thailand) PetchMuangSuang SitplaiNgam	Muaymansananmuang, Rangsit Stadium	Pathum Thani, Thailand	Decision	5	3:00
2023-01-21	Win	(Thailand) PetchMuangSuang SitplaiNgam	Suek Muayded Sangwienduad, Or.Tor.Gor3 Stadium	Nonthaburi province, Thailand	Decision	5	3:00
2023-01-12	Loss	(Thailand) Somraknoi Muayded789	Petchyindee, Rajadamnern Stadium	Bangkok, Thailand	Decision	5	3:00
2022-11-06	Loss	(Cambodia) Sangkhim Bheut	KAS	Phnom Penh, Cambodia	Decision	3	3:00
2022-10-22	Win	(Thailand) Yokmorakot Wor.Sangprapai	Ruamponkon Meepuen	Samut Sakhon province, Thailand	Decision	5	3:00
2022-08-26	Win	(Thailand) Yokmorakot Wor.Sangprapai	Muaymanwansuk, Rangsit Stadium	Pathum Thani, Thailand	Decision	5	3:00
2022-06-16	Loss	(Thailand) Pirapat Muayded789	Petchyindee, Rajadamnern Stadium	Bangkok, Thailand	Decision	5	3:00
2022-05-26	Win	(Thailand) Puenkon Tor.Surat	Petchyindee, Rajadamnern Stadium	Bangkok, Thailand	Decision	5	3:00
2022-04-22	Win	(Thailand) Fahpratan SingAchawin	Muaymanwusk, Rangsit Stadium	Rangsit, Thailand	Decision	5	3:00
2022-02-10	Loss	(Thailand) Petchwanchai Wor.Sangprapai	Petchyindee, Rajadamnern Stadium	Bangkok, Thailand	Decision	5	3:00
2021-12-03	Loss	(Thailand) Pirapat Muayded789	Petchyindee + Muaymanwansuk, Rangsit Stadium	Rangsit, Thailand	Decision	5	3:00
Loses True4U Muaymanwansuk Bantamweight title.
2021-10-29	Loss	(Thailand) Yokmorakot Wor.Sangprapai	Muaymanwansuk	Buriram province, Thailand	Decision	5	3:00
2021-09-30	Win	(Thailand) Pirapat Muayded789	Petchyindee Road Show	Buriram province, Thailand	Decision	5	3:00
2020-12-11	Win	(Thailand) Yodthong Sor.Jor.Tongprajin	True4U Muaymanwansuk, Rangsit Stadium	Rangsit, Thailand	Decision	5	3:00
Wins the True4U Muaymanwansuk Bantamweight title.
2020-11-20	Win	(Thailand) Yodpot Nor.AnuwatGym	True4U Muaymanwansuk, Rangsit Stadium	Rangsit, Thailand	Decision	5	3:00
2020-10-09	Loss	(Thailand) Yodthong Sor.Jor.Tongprajin	True4U Muaymanwansuk, Rangsit Stadium	Rangsit, Thailand	Decision	5	3:00
For the True4U Muaymanwansuk Bantamweight title.
2020-09-11	Win	(Thailand) Yodthong Sor.Jor.Tongprajin	True4U Muaymanwansuk, Rangsit Stadium	Rangsit, Thailand	Decision	5	3:00
2020-08-07	Loss	(Thailand) Satanmuanglek Petchyindee	True4U Muaymanwansuk, Rangsit Stadium	Rangsit, Thailand	KO (Elbow)	3	
2020-02-26	Win	(Thailand) Kwanmongkol Sathianpongmongkolmuay	Wanmitchai, Rajadamnern Stadium	Bangkok, Thailand	KO (Knees to the body)	3	
2019-11-13	Win	(Japan) Kojima Nor.Naksin	Suk Wan Kingthong "Go to Raja"	Tokyo, Japan	Decision (Unanimous)	5	3:00
Wins the IBF Muay Thai World Super Flyweight title.
2019-10-14	Win	(Thailand) PetchAnuwat Nor.AnuwatGym	Wanmitchai, Rajadamnern Stadium	Bangkok, Thailand	Decision	5	3:00
2019-08-09	Win	(Japan) Issei Ishii	True4u, Lumpinee Stadium	Bangkok, Thailand	Decision	5	3:00
Wins the vacant WBC Muay Thai World Super Flyweight title and 1 million baht side-bet.
2019-07-15	Win	(Thailand) Rit Sor.Visetkit	Wanmitchai, Rajadamnern Stadium	Bangkok, Thailand	KO (Low kick)	2	
2019-06-12	Loss	(Japan) Issei Ishii	Suk Wan Kingthong	Tokyo, Japan	KO (Spinning Back Kick)	3	3:00
For the vacant IBF Muay Thai World Flyweight title.
2019-04-10	Win	(Thailand) Rungpitak Nuisimoommuang	Wanmitchai, Rajadamnern Stadium	Bangkok, Thailand	Decision	5	3:00
2019-02-13	Win	(Thailand) Sangfah Nor.AnuwatGym	WanGingThong, Rajadamnern Stadium	Bangkok, Thailand	Decision	5	3:00
2019-01-17	Loss	(Thailand) Tayat Or.Prasert	Petchyindee, Rajadamnern Stadium	Bangkok, Thailand	Decision	5	3:00
2018-08-27	Win	(Thailand) Fourwheel Sitcharoensap	Wanmitchai, Rajadamnern Stadium	Bangkok, Thailand	KO (Knees to the body)	4	
2018-06-29	Loss	(Thailand) Petchanuwat Nor.AnuwatGym	True4U Muaymanwansuk, Rangsit Stadium	Rangsit, Thailand	Decision	5	3:00
2018-05-25	Win	(Thailand) Petchanuwat Nor.AnuwatGym	True4U Muaymanwansuk, Rangsit Stadium	Rangsit, Thailand	Decision	5	3:00
Wins the True4U Muaymanwansuk Mini Flyweight title.
2018-03-30	Win	(Thailand) Petchwanchai Wor.Sangprapai	True4U Muaymanwansuk, Rangsit Stadium	Rangsit, Thailand	Decision	5	3:00
2018-02-23	Win	(Thailand) Petchjongrak Wor.Sangprapai	True4U Muaymanwansuk, Rangsit Stadium	Rangsit, Thailand	Decision	5	3:00
2018-01-04	Win	(Thailand) Petchjongrak Wor.Sangprapai	Petchyindee, Rajadamnern Stadium	Bangkok, Thailand	Decision	5	3:00
2017-11-17	Win	(Thailand) Kombang Kiatnadee	True4U Muaymanwansuk, Rangsit Stadium	Rangsit, Thailand	KO	3	
2017-09-29	Loss	(Thailand) Petchanuwat Nor.AnuwatGym	Rangsit Stadium	Rangsit, Thailand	Decision	5	3:00
2017-07-26	Loss	(Thailand) Petchwanchai Gor.Attisak	Petchyindee, Rajadamnern Stadium	Bangkok, Thailand	TKO	4	
2017-06-23	Win	(Thailand) Mangkonyok TNMuaythai		Kalasin Province, Thailand	Decision	5	3:00
2017-05-22	Loss	(Thailand) Santos Sor.Saranpat	Wangingthong, Rajadamnern Stadium	Bangkok, Thailand	Decision	5	3:00
2017-04-12	Loss	(Thailand) Petchwanchai Gor.Attisak	Wangingthong, Rajadamnern Stadium	Bangkok, Thailand	Decision	5	3:00
2017-02-02	Win	(Thailand) IQ Erawan	Petchyindee, Rajadamnern Stadium	Bangkok, Thailand	Decision	5	3:00
2016-11-14	Draw	(Thailand) Seeoi Singmawin	Wan Kingtong + Petchwiset, Rajadamnern Stadium	Bangkok, Thailand	Decision	5	3:00
2016-10-10	Win	(Thailand) Buakawlek Sit.Boonchob		Thailand	KO	2	
2016-05-18	Win	(Thailand) Petchdet Sakwichian	Wanmeechai, Rajadamnern Stadium	Bangkok, Thailand	Decision	5	3:00
Legend: Win Loss Draw/No contest Notes

Amateur Muay Thai record
Date	Result	Opponent	Event	Location	Method	Round	Time
2023-10-02	Loss	(France) Ismail Staub	IFMA Youth World Championship, U23 Tournament Quarterfinals	Antalya, Turkey	Forfeit (injury)	1	
2023-10-01	Win	(Turkey) DoĞukan Sermİklİ	IFMA Youth World Championship, U23 Tournament First Round	Antalya, Turkey	TKO	2	
Legend: Win Loss Draw/No contest Notes
