= List of sport venues in Bangkok =

The following is a list of stadiums in Bangkok, Thailand. They are ordered by their seating capacity, that is the maximum number of spectators that the stadium can accommodate in seated areas. The list includes stadiums in the Bangkok Metropolitan Region including the provinces of Nakhon Pathom, Pathum Thani, Nonthaburi, Samut Prakan, and Samut Sakhon.

Bangkok is home to a number of stadiums and sport clubs. The largest stadia are typically for football clubs however there are also a number of venues for other sports which have been constructed for events such as the 1998 Asian Games and 2012 FIFA Futsal World Cup.

Stadium	Seating capacity	Sport	Home team(s)
Rajamangala Stadium	49,749	Football, Athletics	Thailand national football team
Chulalongkorn University Stadium	25,000	Football	Chamchuri United F.C.
Thai Army Sports Stadium	20,000	Football	Army United F.C. Royal Thai Army F.C,
Thammasat Stadium #	20,000	Football	Thammasat F.C.
Thupatemi Stadium #	20,000	Football	Air Force Central F.C.
Suphachalasai Stadium (National Stadium complex)	19,793	Football	Thailand national football team
Leo Stadium #	16,014	Football	Bangkok Glass F.C.
Indoor Stadium Huamark	15,000	Boxing, Basketball, Futsal, Volleyball	
SCG Stadium (Thunderdome Stadium) #	15,000	Football	Muangthong United F.C.
Impact, Muang Thong Thani #	12,000	Tennis, Weightlifting, Gymnastics, Boxing	
PAT Stadium	12,308	Football	Thai Port F.C.
Bangkok Arena	12,000	Futsal, Basketball, Volleyball	
Thai-Japanese Stadium	10,320	Football	Bangkok United F.C.
Lumpinee Boxing Stadium	9,500	Muay Thai	
72nd Anniversary Stadium (Min Buri)	8,500	Football	Thai Honda Ladkrabang F.C.
72nd Anniversary Stadium (Bang Mod)	8,000	Football	Bangkok F.C.
Rajadamnern Stadium	7,500	Muay Thai	
Thephasadin Stadium (National Stadium complex)	6,378	Hockey, Football	Bangkok Christian College F.C.
Chanchai Acadium	6,000	Boxing, Basketball, Futsal, Volleyball	
Nimibutr Stadium (National Stadium complex)	5,600	Handball, Basketball, Futsal, Boxing	
Stadium 29	5,000	Basketball	Mono Vampire
Mahanakorn UNI Stadium	5,000	Football	
Bangkok University Stadium #	5,000	Football	Bangkok University Deffo F.C.
TOT Stadium Chaeng Watthana	5,000	Football	Kasetsart F.C.
Nong Chok Sport Stadium	5,000	Football	
Boonyajinda Stadium	5,000	Football	Police Tero F.C.
Kasikorn Bank Stadium	5,000	Football	Thai Farmers Bank F.C. (defunct)
Insee Chantarasatit Stadium	4,000	Football	Kasetsart University F.C.
King Mongkut's Institute of Technology Ladkrabang Stadium	3,500	Football	
Osotsapa Stadium	3,000	Football	Osotsapa FC
Lad Krabang 54 Stadium #	2,000	Football	Customs United F.C. Samut Prakan F.C.
Bangkok Bank Ground	2,000	Football	Bangkok Bank F.C. (defunct)
Yasoob Football Field	2,500	Football	
Bangkokthonburi University Stadium	1,500	Football	
RBAC University Stadium	1,000	Football	RBAC F.C.
Asian Institute of Technology Ground		Cricket	Thailand national cricket team
Thailand Cricket Ground		Cricket	Thailand national cricket team
Prem Tinsulanonda International School Ground		Cricket	Thailand national cricket team
Royal Bangkok Sports Club		Golf, Polo	
Rangsit Stadium #	N/A	Muay Thai	
Siam Boxing Stadium #	1,000	Muay Thai	

# In the Bangkok Metropolitan Region, not the city proper

== See also ==
- List of football stadiums in Thailand
