= Saotho Sitchefboontham =

Thai Muay Thai fighter

- Born: Oattharin Fuklin; August 16, 1997 (age 29); Thailand
- Other names: Saoto Kesagym; Saotho Or.Atchariya (เสาโท อ.อัจฉริยะ)
- Height: 164 cm (5 ft 5 in)
- Weight: 54 kg (119 lb; 8.5 st)
- Fighting out of: Bangkok, Thailand

Other information
- Notable relatives: Saoek Sitchefboontham (twin brother)

Saotho Sitchefboontham (Thai: เสาโท ศิษย์เชฟบุญธรรม) is a Thai Muay Thai fighter.

== Titles and accomplishments ==
- Rajadamnern Stadium
  - 2019 Rajadamnern Stadium 118 lbs Champion
    - One successful title defense
  - 2019 Rajadamnern Stadium Fighter of the Year

== Fight record ==
Muay Thai Record
| Date | Result | Opponent | Event | Location | Method | Round | Time |
|---|---|---|---|---|---|---|---|
| 2026-10-22 | Win | (Thailand) JJ Theppakin | Petchyindee, Rajadamnern Stadium | Bangkok, Thailand | KO | 2 | |
| 2026-09-24 | Win | (Thailand) Adtewada Tor.Surat | Petchyindee, Rajadamnern Stadium | Bangkok, Thailand | Decision | 5 | 3:00 |
| 2026-08-13 | Win | (Thailand) Lanyakaew GotzyMuayChob | Petchyindee, Rajadamnern Stadium | Bangkok, Thailand | KO | 2 | |
| 2026-07-04 | Loss | (Thailand) Pangtor Por.Lakboon | Rajadamnern World Series | Bangkok, Thailand | KO (Body punches) | 2 | 2:43 |
For the interim Rajadamnern Stadium Bantamweight (118 lbs) title.
| 2026-05-17 | Win | (Thailand) Phetnorasing P.K. Saenchai | TKO Kiatpetch, Rajadamnern Stadium | Bangkok, Thailand | Decision | 5 | 3:00 |
| 2026-04-09 | Loss | (Thailand) Adtewada Tor.Surat | Petchyindee, Rajadamnern Stadium | Bangkok, Thailand | Decision | 5 | 3:00 |
| 2026-03-05 | Loss | (Thailand) Adtewada Tor.Surat | Petchyindee, Rajadamnern Stadium | Bangkok, Thailand | Decision | 5 | 3:00 |
| 2026-01-22 | Loss | (Thailand) Pangtor Por.Lakboon | Petchyindee, Rajadamnern Stadium | Bangkok, Thailand | KO (Knee to the body) | 3 | |
| 2025-12-04 | Win | (Thailand) JJ Or.Pimonsri | Petchyindee, Rajadamnern Stadium | Bangkok, Thailand | Decision | 5 | 3:00 |
| 2025-10-28 | Loss | (Thailand) Nuapayak Wor.Sangprapai | Muaymansananmuang | Nakhon Sawan province, Thailand | Decision | 5 | 3:00 |
| 2025-10-02 | Loss | (Thailand) Petchthailand Kitkasem | Petchyindee, Rajadamnern Stadium | Bangkok, Thailand | Decision | 5 | 3:00 |
| 2025-09-04 | Win | (Thailand) Touch Wor.Wattanasupong | Petchyindee, Rajadamnern Stadium | Bangkok, Thailand | KO | 2 | |
| 2025-08-05 | Loss | (Thailand) Petchsithong Sor.Saknarin | Muaymansananmuang, Rangsit Stadium | Pathum Thani, Thailand | Decision | 5 | 3:00 |
| 2025-05-08 | Loss | (Thailand) Detphet Muayded789 | Petchyindee, Rajadamnern Stadium | Bangkok, Thailand | KO (Right elbow) | 4 | |
| 2025-03-27 | Win | (Thailand) Maneedaeng FighterMuayThai | Petchyindee, Rajadamnern Stadium | Bangkok, Thailand | KO | 2 | |
| 2025-01-02 | Loss | (Thailand) Puenyin Por.Lakboon | Petchyindee, Rajadamnern Stadium | Bangkok, Thailand | Decision | 5 | 3:00 |
| 2024-11-28 | Win | (Thailand) Yokmorakot PadoAyutthaya | Petchyindee, Rajadamnern Stadium - Hadao Ngernlan tournament | Bangkok, Thailand | KO (Knee to the body) | 3 | |
| 2024-10-31 | Loss | (Thailand) Nueng Erawan | Petchyindee, Rajadamnern Stadium | Bangkok, Thailand | Decision | 5 | 3:00 |
| 2024-09-12 | Win | (Thailand) Petchnamchok Aor.Pimonsri | PRYDE TV + Petchyindee, Rajadamnern Stadium | Bangkok, Thailand | KO (Elbow) | 2 | 2:43 |
| 2024-07-30 | Win | (Thailand) Yokmorakot Wor.Sangprapai | Muaymansananmuang, Rangsit Stadium | Pathum Thani, Thailand | Decision | 5 | 3:00 |
| 2024-05-31 | Loss | (Thailand) Phetnamchok Sor.Jor.Tongprachin | Muaymumwansuk, Rangsit Stadium | Pathum Thani, Thailand | Decision | 5 | 3:00 |
| 2023-04-11 | Loss | (Thailand) Petchsila Wor.Auracha | Muaymansananmuang Mahasarakham | Maha Sarakham province, Thailand | Decision | 5 | 3:00 |
| 2023-02-21 | Loss | (Thailand) Kumandoi PetchyindeeAcademy | Muaymansananmuanng | Bangkok, Thailand | Decision | 5 | 3:00 |
| 2023-01-28 | Loss | (Thailand) Yokmorakot Wor.Sangprapai | Suek Muay Mahakuson Samakom Chao Paktai | Bangkok, Thailand | Decision | 5 | 3:00 |
| 2022-11-18 | Win | (Thailand) Patakpetch VK.KhaoYai | Ruamponkon + Prachin | Prachinburi province, Thailand | Decision | 5 | 3:00 |
| 2022-10-07 | Win | (Thailand) Petchsila Wor.Auracha | Petchyindee | Maha Sarakham province, Thailand | KO (Elbow) | 3 | |
| 2022-09-11 | Win | (Thailand) Pirapat Muayded789 | Petchyindee, Rajadamnern Stadium | Bangkok, Thailand | Decision | 5 | 3:00 |
| 2022-07-21 | Loss | (Thailand) Phetpailin Sor.Jor.Tongprachin | Singpatong, Patong Stadium | Phuket province, Thailand | Decision | 5 | 3:00 |
| 2022-05-12 | Loss | (Thailand) Pirapat Muayded789 | Petchyindee, Rajadamnern Stadium | Bangkok, Thailand | Decision | 5 | 3:00 |
| 2022-03-31 | Win | (Thailand) PetchAnuwat Nor.AnuwatGym | Petchyindee, Rajadamnern Stadium | Bangkok, Thailand | KO (Elbow) | 3 | |
| 2022-02-18 | Win | (Thailand) Yokmorakot Wor.Sangprapai | Muaymanwansuk True4U, Rangsit Stadium | Rangsit, Thailand | Decision (split) | 5 | 3:00 |
| 2021-11-25 | Loss | (Thailand) Diesellek Wor.Wanchai | Petchyindee True4U, Rangsit Stadium | Rangsit, Thailand | Decision | 5 | 3:00 |
For the True4U Super Bantamweight (122 lbs) title and a 1 million baht side-bet.
| 2021-04-07 | Win | (Thailand) Mohawk Teeded99 | Chefboontham, Rangsit Stadium | Rangsit, Thailand | Decision | 5 | 3:00 |
| 2020-12-11 | Loss | (Thailand) Puenkon Tor.Surat | True4U Muaymanwansuk, Rangsit Stadium | Pathum Thani, Thailand | Decision | 5 | 3:00 |
| 2020-11-09 | Draw | (Thailand) Suesat Paeminburi | Chef Boontham, Rangsit Stadium | Pathum Thani, Thailand | Decision | 5 | 3:00 |
| 2020-10-05 | Loss | (Thailand) Suesat Paeminburi | R1 UFA, World Siam Stadium | Bangkok, Thailand | Decision | 5 | 3:00 |
| 2020-09-12 | Win | (Thailand) Eakalak Sor.SamarnGarment | OrTorGor.3 Stadium | Nonthaburi, Thailand | Decision | 5 | 3:00 |
| 2020-08-04 | Loss | (Thailand) Kumandoi Petcharoenvit | Chef Boontham, Thanakorn Stadium | Nakhon Pathom Province, Thailand | Decision | 5 | 3:00 |
| 2020-03-12 | Loss | (Thailand) Kumandoi Petcharoenvit | Rajadamnern Stadium | Bangkok, Thailand | Decision | 5 | 3:00 |
| 2020-01-23 | Win | (Thailand) Methee Sor.Jor.Toipaedriew | Rajadamnern Stadium | Bangkok, Thailand | KO (Right Middle Kick) | 3 | |
| 2019-12-23 | Win | (Thailand) Phetbankek Sor.Sommai | Rajadamnern Stadium | Bangkok, Thailand | Decision | 5 | 3:00 |
| 2019-11-21 | Win | (Thailand) Diesellek Wor.Wanchai | Rajadamnern Stadium | Bangkok, Thailand | Decision | 5 | 3:00 |
| 2019-10-20 | Draw | (Japan) Mutsuki Ebata | SNKA MAGNUM 51 | Tokyo, Japan | Decision | 5 | 3:00 |
Defends the Rajadamnern Stadium Bantamweight title.
| 2019-08-15 | Win | (Thailand) Nongyot Sitjekan | Rajadamnern Stadium | Bangkok, Thailand | Decision | 5 | 3:00 |
| 2019-06-27 | Win | (Thailand) Kongsak Sor.Satra | Rajadamnern Stadium | Bangkok, Thailand | KO (Left Elbow) | 3 | |
| 2019-05-16 | Win | (Thailand) Phetthanakit JSP | Rajadamnern Stadium | Bangkok, Thailand | Decision | 5 | 3:00 |
| 2019-03-15 | Win | (Thailand) Ekwayu Mor.Bankkokthonburi | Lumpinee Stadium | Bangkok, Thailand | Decision | 5 | 3:00 |
| 2019-01-23 | Win | (Thailand) Kongsak Sor.Satra | Rajadamnern Stadium | Bangkok, Thailand | Decision | 5 | 3:00 |
Wins the Rajadamnern Stadium Bantamweight title.
| 2018-12-19 | Win | (Thailand) Yodwittaya Sirilakmuaythai | Rajadamnern Stadium | Bangkok, Thailand | Decision | 5 | 3:00 |
| 2018-11-15 | Win | (Thailand) Suemit Mor.Puwana | Rajadamnern Stadium | Bangkok, Thailand | KO (Left Elbow) | 4 | |
| 2018-10-10 | Draw | (Thailand) Detchaiya Petchyindee | Rajadamnern Stadium | Bangkok, Thailand | Decision | 5 | 3:00 |
| 2018-09-06 | Loss | (Thailand) Kongsak Sor.Satra | Rajadamnern Stadium | Bangkok, Thailand | Decision | 5 | 3:00 |
| 2018-07-19 | Win | (Thailand) Samingdam Miamicondobangpu | Rajadamnern Stadium | Bangkok, Thailand | Decision | 5 | 3:00 |
| 2018-05-18 | Loss | (Thailand) Thongrob Lukbanyai | Rajadamnern Stadium | Bangkok, Thailand | Decision | 5 | 3:00 |
| 2018-03-22 | Win | (Thailand) Kaokrai Chor.Hapayak | Rajadamnern Stadium | Bangkok, Thailand | Decision | 5 | 3:00 |
| 2018-02-22 | Win | (Thailand) Rambong Lezorkanka | Rajadamnern Stadium | Bangkok, Thailand | Decision | 5 | 3:00 |
| 2018-01-25 | Win | (Thailand) Chalawan Attachaimuaythai | Rajadamnern Stadium | Bangkok, Thailand | Decision | 5 | 3:00 |
| 2017-12-25 | Win | (Thailand) Phetbankek Sor.Sommai | Rajadamnern Stadium | Bangkok, Thailand | Decision | 5 | 3:00 |
| 2017-11-15 | Win | (Thailand) Phetthanakit JSP | Rajadamnern Stadium | Bangkok, Thailand | Decision | 5 | 3:00 |
| 2017-09-27 | Win | (Thailand) Chatploy Por.Poonsawat | Rajadamnern Stadium | Bangkok, Thailand | Decision | 5 | 3:00 |
| 2017-08-23 | Win | (Thailand) Phettamaew So.Sattra | Rajadamnern Stadium | Bangkok, Thailand | Decision | 5 | 3:00 |
| 2017-07-05 | Win | (Thailand) Thanadet Thor.Pan 49 | Rajadamnern Stadium | Bangkok, Thailand | Decision | 5 | 3:00 |
| 2017-05-22 | Win | (Thailand) Chawarit Kiatchaiyuth | Rajadamnern Stadium | Bangkok, Thailand | Decision | 5 | 3:00 |
| 2017-04-27 | Loss | (Thailand) Thanadet Thor.Pan 49 | Rajadamnern Stadium | Bangkok, Thailand | Decision | 5 | 3:00 |
| 2017-03-09 | Loss | (Thailand) Kongthoranee Sor.Sommai | Rajadamnern Stadium | Bangkok, Thailand | Decision | 5 | 3:00 |
| 2017-01-04 | Draw | (Thailand) Phetthanakit JSP | Rajadamnern Stadium | Bangkok, Thailand | Decision | 5 | 3:00 |
| 2016-12-08 | Win | (Thailand) Chatphet Sor.Punsawat | Rajadamnern Stadium | Bangkok, Thailand | Decision | 5 | 3:00 |
| 2016-11-16 | Win | (Thailand) Phettamaew So.Sattra | | Thailand | Decision | 5 | 3:00 |
| 2016-09-15 | Win | (Thailand) Kongsak Sor.Satra | Rajadamnern Stadium | Bangkok, Thailand | Decision | 5 | 3:00 |
| 2016-08-10 | Loss | (Thailand) Phetthanakit JSP | Rajadamnern Stadium | Bangkok, Thailand | Decision | 5 | 3:00 |
| 2016-07-04 | Loss | (Thailand) Phetthanakit JSP | Rajadamnern Stadium | Bangkok, Thailand | Decision | 5 | 3:00 |
| 2016-06-06 | Win | (Thailand) Kaokrai Chor.Hapayak | Rajadamnern Stadium | Bangkok, Thailand | Decision | 5 | 3:00 |
| 2016-05-12 | Win | (Thailand) Phetchiangkwan Nayoksomdet | Rajadamnern Stadium | Bangkok, Thailand | Decision | 5 | 3:00 |
| 2016-04-21 | Win | (Thailand) Den Sor.PhetUdon | Rajadamnern Stadium | Bangkok, Thailand | Decision | 5 | 3:00 |
| 2016-03-30 | Win | (Thailand) Kaokrai Chor.Hapayak | Rajadamnern Stadium | Bangkok, Thailand | Decision | 5 | 3:00 |
| 2016-03-07 | Win | (Thailand) Tuakeaw Khunpanpasak | Rajadamnern Stadium | Bangkok, Thailand | Decision | 5 | 3:00 |
| 2016-02-11 | Loss | (Thailand) Den Sor.PhetUdon | Rajadamnern Stadium | Bangkok, Thailand | Decision | 5 | 3:00 |
| 2015-09-27 | Win | (Thailand) Jacksaim Maxjandee | Lat Phrao Boxing Stadium | Thailand | Decision | 5 | 3:00 |
| 2015-09-02 | Loss | (Thailand) Phetnamnueng Sipanomgym | Rajadamnern Stadium | Bangkok, Thailand | KO | 4 | |
| 2015-07-21 | Loss | (Thailand) Chok Phor.Pat | Lumpinee Stadium | Bangkok, Thailand | Decision | 5 | 3:00 |
| 2015-05-22 | Win | (Thailand) Buriram Sasiprapagym | Lumpinee Stadium | Bangkok, Thailand | Decision | 5 | 3:00 |
| 2015-03-27 | Win | (Thailand) Manachai O.Bangna | Lumpinee Stadium | Bangkok, Thailand | Decision | 5 | 3:00 |
| 2015-02-24 | Win | (Thailand) Pettungyung Kelasport | Lumpinee Stadium | Bangkok, Thailand | Decision | 5 | 3:00 |
| 2015-01-25 | Win | (Thailand) Thanachai Sor.Jor.Vichitpedriew | Rajadamnern Stadium | Bangkok, Thailand | Decision | 5 | 3:00 |
| 2014-12-27 | Win | (Thailand) Newclear Jayutkongseup | Rajadamnern Stadium | Bangkok, Thailand | Decision | 5 | 3:00 |
Legend: Win Loss Draw/No contest Notes

Amateur Muay Thai Record
| Date | Result | Opponent | Event | Location | Method | Round | Time |
|---|---|---|---|---|---|---|---|
| 2023-05-06 | Loss | (Kazakhstan) Shamil Yermagambetov | IFMA Senior World Championships 2023, First Round | Bangkok, Thailand | Decision (unanimous) | 3 | 3:00 |
Legend: Win Loss Draw/No contest Notes
