= Suesat Paeminburi =

Thai Muay Thai fighter (born 1993)

- Born: Theerapan Khotpan; July 3, 1993 (age 33); Thailand
- Other names: Suesat Manop Gym; Suesat 13CoinsResort; Suesat Phoyoksamunprai
- Nationality: Thai
- Height: 170 cm (5 ft 7 in)
- Weight: 55 kg (121 lb; 8.7 st)
- Division: Bantamweight; Super-bantamweight
- Style: Muay Bouk
- Fighting out of: Bangkok, Thailand
- Team: Pangkongprab-Paeminburi; Manop Gym

Suesat Paeminburi (Thai: ซื่อสัตย์ แป๊ะมีนบุรี) is a Thai Muay Thai fighter. His natural weight is 58.5 kg (129 lb; 9.2 st). He retired in 2021 at 28 years old before coming back in 2023.

== Titles and accomplishments ==
- 2020 Channel 7 Stadium 118 lbs Champion
- 2019 Channel 7 Fight of the Year (vs Chokdee Nuikafaeboran)
- 2nd Grakcu Tournament Champion (2017)

== Fight record ==
Muay Thai Record (incomplete)
| Date | Result | Opponent | Event | Location | Method | Round | Time |
|---|---|---|---|---|---|---|---|
| 2026-09-16 | Loss | (Thailand) Yokkiri TN.MuayThai | Muay Thai Palangmai, Rajadamnern Stadium | Bangkok, Thailand | Decision | 5 | 3:00 |
| 2026-08-19 | Loss | (Thailand) Tamnanthai P.K.SaenchaiMuayThaiGym | Muay Thai Palangmai, Rajadamnern Stadium | Bangkok, Thailand | Decision | 5 | 3:00 |
| 2026-06-10 | Win | (Thailand) Paryim Sor.Boonmeerit | Palangmai, Rajadamnern Stadium | Bangkok, Thailand | KO | 2 | |
| 2026-03-25 | Loss | (Thailand) Songpayak YokkaosaenchaiGym | Muay Thai Palangmai, Rajadamnern Stadium | Bangkok, Thailand | Decision | 5 | 3:00 |
| 2026-03-04 | Win | (Thailand) Chalamdam Sor.Boonmeerit | Palangmai, Rajadamnern Stadium | Bangkok, Thailand | KO | 3 | |
| 2026-01-28 | Win | (Thailand) Longoen Sor.Sommai | Palangmai, Rajadamnern Stadium | Bangkok, Thailand | TKO (Low kicks) | 3 | 1:03 |
| 2025-12-12 | Win | (Thailand) Chokpreecha P.K.Saenchai | ONE Friday Fights 136, Lumpinee Stadium | Bangkok, Thailand | Decision (Unanimous) | 3 | 3:00 |
| 2025-09-17 | Win | (Thailand) Petchsaenkom Sor.Sommai | Palangmai, Rajadamnern Stadium | Bangkok, Thailand | KO | 4 | |
| 2025-08-16 | Loss | (Thailand) Khunsueknoi Boomdeksian | Rajadamnern World Series | Bangkok, Thailand | Decision (Unanimous) | 3 | 3:00 |
| 2025-07-09 | Loss | (Thailand) Khunsueknoi Boomdeksian | Muay Thai Palangmai, Rajadamnern Stadium | Bangkok, Thailand | Decision | 5 | 3:00 |
| 2025-05-02 | Win | (Thailand) Chalamdam Sor.Boonmeerit | ONE Friday Fights 106, Lumpinee Stadium | Bangkok, Thailand | TKO (Low kicks) | 1 | 1:24 |
| 2025-01-20 | Win | (Thailand) Apidet Sor.Sommai | Muay Thai Pantamit Sanjorn Pathum Thani | Pathum Thani, Thailand | Decision | 5 | 3:00 |
| 2024-12-07 | Loss | (Thailand) Boonchu Sor.Boonmeerit | SuekJaoMuayThai, Omnoi Stadium | Samut Sakhon, Thailand | Decision | 5 | 3:00 |
| 2024-11-13 | Win | (Thailand) Kaenphitak Nayaparkview | Muay Thai Palangmai, Rajadamnern Stadium | Bangkok, Thailand | Decision | 5 | 3:00 |
| 2024-10-09 | Loss | (Thailand) Mehtee SorSor.ToiPadriew | Muay Thai Palangmai, Rajadamnern Stadium | Bangkok, Thailand | Decision | 5 | 3:00 |
| 2024-09-01 | Win | (Thailand) Lukkwan Sujibamigiew | Muaydee VitheeThai, Thupatemi Stadium | Bangkok, Thailand | KO (leg kick) | 2 | |
| 2024-05-03 | Loss | (Lebanon) Abdallah Ondash | ONE Friday Fights 61, Lumpinee Stadium | Bangkok, Thailand | Decision (Unanimous) | 3 | 3:00 |
| 2024-02-02 | Loss | (Thailand) Chokpreecha P.K.Saenchai | ONE Friday Fights 50, Lumpinee Stadium | Bangkok, Thailand | Decision (Unanimous) | 3 | 3:00 |
| 2023-12-31 | Win | (Thailand) Petchrapa Sor.Sopit | TorNamThai Ruamponkon Samui Kiatpetch, Rajadamnern Stadium | Bangkok, Thailand | Decision | 5 | 3:00 |
| 2023-10-21 | Loss | (China) Gao Yuhang | EWD Championship | Shenzhen, China | Decision (Unanimous) | 3 | 3:00 |
| 2023-02-03 | Loss | (China) Liu Zhipeng | Wu Lin Feng 533: China vs Thailand | Zhengzhou, China | Decision (Unanimous) | 3 | 3:00 |
| 2021-02-07 | Loss | (Thailand) Phetpailin SorJor.Tongprachin | Channel 7 Stadium | Bangkok, Thailand | Decision | 5 | 3:00 |
| 2020-12-08 | Draw | (Thailand) Phetpailin SorJor.Tongprachin | Lumpinee Birthday Show, Lumpinee Stadium | Bangkok, Thailand | Decision | 5 | 3:00 |
| 2020-11-09 | Draw | (Thailand) SaoTho Sitchefboonthum | Chef Boontham, Rangsit Stadium | Rangsit, Thailand | Decision | 5 | 3:00 |
| 2020-10-05 | Win | (Thailand) SaoTho Sitchefboonthum | R1 UFA, World Siam Stadium | Bangkok, Thailand | Decision | 5 | 3:00 |
| 2020-07-12 | Win | (Thailand) Wanchalong P.K.Saenchai | Channel 7 Stadium | Bangkok, Thailand | TKO (referee stoppage) | 4 | |
Wins the 118 lbs Channel 7 Stadium title.
| 2020-02-27 | Win | (Thailand) Suesuk Sor.Phannoot | Muayprajaoprom + Kiatphetch, Maesai Chiangrai Stadium | Chiang Rai, Thailand | KO | 2 | |
| 2019-09-29 | Win | (Thailand) Kangkaodaeng Huarongnamkeng | Channel 7 Stadium | Bangkok, Thailand | KO | 4 | |
| 2019-08-25 | Win | (Thailand) Chokdee Nuikafaeboran | Channel 7 Stadium | Bangkok, Thailand | Decision | 5 | 3:00 |
| 2019-06-30 | Win | (Thailand) Donking Singmawin | Nonthaburi Stadium | Nonthaburi, Thailand | Decision | 5 | 3:00 |
| 2019-05-25 | Win | (Thailand) Narindet Kor.Thasai | Lumpinee Stadium | Bangkok, Thailand | KO | 4 | |
| 2019-01-20 | Win | (Thailand) Saifon Rattanapanu | Channel 7 Stadium | Bangkok, Thailand | Decision | 5 | 3:00 |
| 2018-11-29 | Win | (Thailand) Kongsak Sor.Sattra | Rajadamnern Stadium | Bangkok, Thailand | Decision | 5 | 3:00 |
| 2018-07-22 | Loss | (Thailand) Superjeng Sor.Samangarment | Channel 7 Stadium | Bangkok, Thailand | Decision | 5 | 3:00 |
| 2018-06-05 | Win | (Thailand) Saifon Rattanapanu | Lumpinee Stadium | Bangkok, Thailand | KO | 3 | |
| 2018-05-01 | Loss | (Thailand) Longern Dabransarakham | Lumpinee Stadium | Bangkok, Thailand | KO (head kick) | 2 | |
| 2017-12-03 | Win | (Thailand) Pompetch Sitnumnoi | Lumpinee Stadium | Bangkok, Thailand | Decision | 5 | 3:00 |
| 2017-11-05 | Win | (Thailand) Wanmeechok Sakburiram | Channel 7 Stadium | Bangkok, Thailand | Decision | 5 | 3:00 |
| 2017-09-08 | Loss | (Thailand) Superjeng Sor.Samangarment | Lumpinee Stadium | Bangkok, Thailand | Decision | 5 | 3:00 |
For the vacant 118 lbs Lumpinee Stadium title.
| 2017-07-30 | Loss | (Thailand) Superjeng Por.Phinnaphat | Channel 7 Stadium | Bangkok, Thailand | Decision | 5 | 3:00 |
| 2017-06-25 | Win | (Thailand) Mahamongkol Sor.Yingcharoenganchang | Channel 7 Stadium | Bangkok, Thailand | Decision | 5 | 3:00 |
| 2017-05-21 | Loss | (Thailand) Phetmuangpair Ayongym | Channel 7 Stadium | Bangkok, Thailand | Decision | 5 | 3:00 |
| 2017-03-26 | Win | (Thailand) Superjeng Por.Phinnaphat | Channel 7 Stadium | Bangkok, Thailand | Decision | 5 | 3:00 |
| 2017-02-26 | Draw | (Thailand) Rungpetch Phetjaroen | Nonthaburi Stadium | Nonthaburi, Thailand | Decision | 5 | 3:00 |
| 2017-01-08 | Win | (Thailand) Phetmuangpair Ayongym | Or.Tor.Gor.3 Stadium | Nonthaburi, Thailand | Decision | 5 | 3:00 |
Wins 2nd Grakcu Tournament and ฿150,000 Grand Prize.
| 2016-09-25 | Win | (Thailand) Wuttichai Singbansang | Or.Tor.Gor.3 Stadium | Nonthaburi, Thailand | Decision | 5 | 3:00 |
| 2016-07-17 | Win | (Thailand) Phetthaksin Tor.Muangkao | Or.Tor.Gor.3 Stadium | Nonthaburi, Thailand | Decision | 5 | 3:00 |
| 2016-06-12 | Win | (Thailand) Phettho Por.Chalad | Or.Tor.Gor.3 Stadium | Nonthaburi, Thailand | KO | 2 | |
| 2016-05-08 | Win | (Thailand) Saeb Parunchai | Rajadamnern Stadium | Bangkok, Thailand | Decision | 5 | 3:00 |
| 2016-04-09 | Win | (Thailand) Wuttichai Singbansang | Rajadamnern Stadium | Bangkok, Thailand | Decision | 5 | 3:00 |
| 2016-03-13 | Win | (Thailand) Esanumchai Dabpomahachai | Rangsit Boxing Stadium | Rangsit, Thailand | KO | 4 | |
| 2016-01-31 | Win | (Thailand) Singkao Sitphuphantu | Rangsit Boxing Stadium | Rangsit, Thailand | Decision | 5 | 3:00 |
| 2016-01-07 | Win | (Thailand) Naruedet Theglafpattaya | Rajadamnern Stadium | Bangkok, Thailand | Decision | 5 | 3:00 |
| 2015-12-06 | Loss | (Thailand) Naruedet Theglafpattaya | Jitmuangnon Stadium | Bangkok, Thailand | Decision | 5 | 3:00 |
| 2015-11-01 | Loss | (Thailand) Phetpailin Sitnayoktawiptapong | Jitmuangnon Stadium | Bangkok, Thailand | KO | 5 | |
| 2015-09-13 | Loss | (Thailand) Khunsuknoi Sitkaewprapon | Channel 7 Stadium | Bangkok, Thailand | Decision | 5 | 3:00 |
| 2015-08-02 | Win | (Thailand) Nopakao Sitsettu | Rajadamnern Stadium | Bangkok, Thailand | Decision | 5 | 3:00 |
| 2015-05-30 | Loss | (Thailand) Phetpailin Sitnayoktawiptapong | Lumpinee Stadium | Bangkok, Thailand | Decision | 5 | 3:00 |
| 2015-03-17 | Loss | (Thailand) Sri-Uthai Sor.Jor.Piek-Uthai | Lumpinee Stadium | Bangkok, Thailand | Decision | 5 | 3:00 |
| 2015-01-18 | Win | (Thailand) Manutongkam Sitpanunchuang | Jitmuangnon Stadium | Bangkok, Thailand | Decision | 5 | 3:00 |
| 2014-12-21 | Win | (Thailand) Superchamp Rachanon | Jitmuangnon Stadium | Bangkok, Thailand | KO | 3 | |
| 2014-11-22 | Loss | (Thailand) Duangsompong Jitmuangnon | Lumpinee Stadium | Bangkok, Thailand | Decision | 5 | 3:00 |
| 2014-10-25 | Win | (Thailand) Thanapetch Pornchaijit | Lumpinee Stadium | Bangkok, Thailand | KO | 3 | |
| 2014-02-01 | Loss | (Thailand) Yotpawarit Sasiprapagym | Lumpinee Stadium | Bangkok, Thailand | Decision | 5 | 3:00 |
Legend: Win Loss Draw/No contest Notes
