= Petchsila Wor.Auracha =

Thai Muay Thai fighter

Petchsila
- Born: Ekkarat Srilarin; March 12, 2004 (age 22); Udon Thani Province, Thailand
- Other names: Petchsila MTM Academy Petchsila Sitsarawatseur (เพชรศิลา ศิษย์สารวัตรเสือ)
- Height: 171 cm (5 ft 7 in)
- Weight: 53 kg (117 lb; 8.3 st)
- Division: Light Flyweight; Flyweight; Super Flyweight; Bantamweight; Super Bantamweight
- Stance: Southpaw
- Fighting out of: Bangkok, Thailand
- Team: Wor.Auracha
- Trainer: Pornmongkol Sakhirunchai

Kickboxing record
- Total: 115
- Wins: 85
- Losses: 28
- Draws: 2

Petchsila Wor.Auracha (Thai: เพชรศิลา ว.อุรชา) is a Thai Muay Thai fighter. He is a former two-time Rajadamnern Stadium Super Bantamweight Champion and the current WMO World Super Bantamweight Champion.

== Biography and career ==
Petchsila started his Bangkok career training at the MTM academy, in 2019 he became the first fighter in the history of his camp to fight for a title when he was matched with Yoddkla Isantrakter by the Petchyindee promotion for the True4U 108 lbs title on November 1 at Lumpinee Stadium. He won the fight by decision.

On December 8, 2019, Petchsila traveled to Japan to compete for the vacant WPMF World Light Flyweight title at the Battle Of Muaythai SEASON II vol.6 event. He defeated the reigning Rajadamnern Stadium Mini Flyweight champion Ryuya Okuwaki by majority decision to become the new world champion at only 15 years old.

Back in Thailand Petchsila had an impressive 2020 showing with six wins, two by way of knockout and only one defeat which he avenged. This success made him notable on the circuit, opening him to competition against top ranked fighters.

On March 12, 2021, Petchsila faced an established Thai champion for the first time when he met Praewprao PetchyindeeAcademy at Rangsit Stadium. Petchsila overcame the pre-fight odds and defeated the former Rajadamnern Stadium champion by decision in a fierce bout. On September 30, Petchsila was matched with the #1 ranked fighter in the division and reigning WMO World Champion Satanmuanglek PetchyindeeAcademy at a Petchyindee promotion event in the Buriram Province. Petchsila shocked the observers winning once again by decision.

On November 11, 2021, Petchsila faced Chokpanlan Por.Lakboon in a rising prospect showdown, both fighters having won nine of their last ten fights. Petchsila won via fourth-round knockout with an elbow strike and was announced as one of the favorites to win the Fighter of the Year award.

As of November 2021 he was ranked the #1 Flyweight contender in the world by both the World Boxing Council Muaythai and the World Muay Thai Organization.

For his results during the year 2021 Petchsila was voted runner-up Fighter of the Year by the Sports Authority of Thailand. He received 15 votes against 18 in favor of Lamnamoonlek Tded99.

Petchsila was booked to face the former WBC Muay Thai and Omnoi Stadium champion Kumandoi PetchyindeeAcademy on March 10, 2022, at the Rajadamnern Stadium for both the True4u and Rajadamnern Stadium 115 lbs titles. Petchsila lost the fight by decision.

== Titles and accomplishments ==
- Rajadamnern Stadium
  - 2025 Rajadamnern Stadium Super Bantamweight (122 lbs) Champion
  - 2026 Rajadamnern Stadium Super Bantamweight (122 lbs) Champion
    - One successful title defense
- World Professional Muaythai Federation
  - 2019 WPMF World Light Flyweight Champion
- True4 Muaymanwansuk
  - 2019 True4U Light Flyweight (108 lbs) Champion
  - 2021 True4U Super Flyweight (115 lbs) Champion
    - One successful title defense
- World Muaythai Organization
  - 2022 WMO World Super-bantamweight (122 lbs) Champion
  - 2025 WMO World Super-bantamweight (122 lbs) Champion
- Professional Boxing Association of Thailand (PAT)
  - 2023 Thailand 122 lbs Champion

Awards

- 2021 Thailand Sports Authority Fighter of the Year runner-up
- 2021 World Muaythai Organization Male Fighter of the Year
- 2021 Sports Writers Association of Thailand Young Fighter of the Year

== Fight record ==
Muay Thai Record
85 Wins, 28 Losses, 2 Draws
Date	Result	Opponent	Event	Location	Method	Round	Time
2026-12-12		(Thailand) Mungkornlek Sor.Thanapon	Rajadamnern World Series	Bangkok, Thailand			
For the Rajadamnern Stadium Featherweight (126 lbs) title.
2026-10-10	Win	(Japan) Koki Osaki	Rajadamnern World Series - Knocktober Fest	Bangkok, Thailand	Decision (Unanimous)	5	3:00
Defends and unifies the Rajadamnern Stadium Super Bantamweight (122 lbs) title.
2026-04-25	Win	(Thailand) Petchsamarn Sor.Samarngarment	Rajadamnern World Series	Bangkok, Thailand	KO (Knee)	2	1:04
Wins the vacant Rajadamnern Stadium Super Bantamweight (122 lbs) title.
2025-12-27	Loss	(Thailand) Khunsueknoi Boomdeksian	Rajadamnern World Series, Rajadamnern Stadium	Bangkok, Thailand	Decision (Unanimous)	5	3:00
Loses the Rajadamnern Stadium Super Bantamweight (122 lbs) title.
2025-09-13	Win	(Thailand) Petchsamarn Sor.Samarngarment	Rajadamnern World Series	Bangkok, Thailand	KO (Left hook)	2	2:59
Wins the Rajadamnern Stadium Super Bantamweight (122 lbs) title.
2025-06-28	Win	(Republic of Ireland) Ryan Sheehan	TOPKING Europe Series	London, England	KO (Left cross)	2	
Wins the vacant WMO World Super Bantamweight title.
2025-05-22	Loss	(Thailand) Seeoui Singmawynn	Petchyindee, Rajadamnern Stadium	Bangkok, Thailand	Decision	5	3:00
2025-01-25	Loss	(Thailand) Petchsamarn Sor.Samarngarment	Rajadamnern World Series	Bangkok, Thailand	Decision (Unanimous)	5	3:00
For the Rajadamnern Stadium Super Bantamweight (122 lbs) title.
2024-11-24	Loss	(Thailand) Wuttikorn Suannamtankiri	TorNamThai Kiatpetch TKO, Rajadamnern Stadium	Bangkok, Thailand	Decision	5	3:00
2024-10-03	Win	(Thailand) Fahpratan Paesaisee	Petchyindee, Rajadamnern Stadium	Bangkok, Thailand	Decision	5	3:00
2024-08-23	Win	(Thailand) Kumandoi PetchyindeeAcademy	Konkraeng Muay Thai Muang Chakangraw + Muaymanwansuk, Kamphaengphet Stadium	Kamphaeng Phet province, Thailand	Decision	5	3:00
2024-07-04	Win	(Thailand) Petchsiam Jor.Pattreya	Petchyindee + Kiatpetch, Rajadamnern Stadium	Bangkok, Thailand	Decision	5	3:00
2024-05-23	Win	(Thailand) Detphet Wor.Sangprapai	PRYDE TV + Petchyindee, Rajadamnern Stadium	Bangkok, Thailand	Decision	5	3:00
2024-03-24	Loss	(Thailand) Diesellek Wor.Wanchai	Ruamponkon Rak Nai Noi	Pattani province, Thailand	Decision	5	3:00
2023-01-06	Win	(Spain) Kevin Martinez	Rajadamnern World Series	Bangkok, Thailand	Decision (Unanimous)	3	3:00
2023-12-05	Loss	(Thailand) Petchmuangsuang SittanaiKay	Muaymansananmuang, Rangsit Stadium	Pathum Thani, Thailand	Decision	5	3:00
2023-09-04	Win	(Thailand) Chatploy Por.Rungsawat	Muay Thai Pantamit, Thupatemi Stadium	Pathum Thani province, Thailand	Decision	5	3:00
Wins the vacant Thailand Super Bantamweight (122 lbs) title.
2023-07-02	Loss	(Japan) Toki Tamaru	RISE World Series 2023 - 1st Round	Osaka, Japan	KO (Knee to the body)	1	2:57
2023-05-26	Loss	(Thailand) Diesellek BuildJC	Petchyindee True4U, Rangsit Stadium	Pathum Thani, Thailand	Decision (Unanimous)	5	3:00
For the True4U 122 lbs title.
2023-04-11	Win	(Thailand) Saotho Or.Atchariya	Muaymansananmuang Mahasarakham	Maha Sarakham province, Thailand	Decision	5	3:00
2023-03-18	Win	(Thailand) Kaenkaew Sor.Boonmeerit	Muayded Sangwienduad, OrTorGor.3 Stadium	Nonthaburi province, Thailand	Decision	5	3:00
2023-01-28	Loss	(Thailand) Seeoui Singmawynn	Suek Muay Mahakuson Samakom Chao Paktai + Suek Muayded Sangwienduad	Bangkok, Thailand	Decision	5	3:00
2022-10-22	Loss	(Thailand) Saotho Or.Atchariya	Muay Thai Rakya Soosakon	Maha Sarakham province	KO (Elbow)	3	
2022-09-08	Win	(Thailand) Kumandoi PetchyindeeAcademy	Petchyindee, Rajadamnern Stadium	Bangkok, Thailand	Decision (Unanimous)	5	3:00
Wins the vacant WMO Super Bantamweight (122 lbs) World title.
2022-07-12	Win	(Thailand) Chatchai Dabrunsarakam	Petchyindee, Rajadamnern Stadium	Bangkok, Thailand	KO (Left elbow)	4	2:47
2022-06-20	Loss	(Thailand) Phetsommai Sor.Sommai	U-Muay RuamJaiKonRakMuayThai + Palangmai, Rajadamnern Stadium	Bangkok, Thailand	Decision	5	3:00
2022-05-12	Loss	(Thailand) Saoek Or.Atchariya	Petchyindee, Rajadamnern Stadium	Bangkok, Thailand	Decision	5	3:00
For the vacant True4U 118 lbs title.
2022-04-21	Win	(Thailand) Puenkon Tor.Surat	Petchyindee, Rajadamnern Stadium	Bangkok, Thailand	Decision	5	3:00
2022-03-10	Loss	(Thailand) Kumandoi PetchyindeeAcademy	Petchyindee, Rajadamnern Stadium	Bangkok, Thailand	Decision	5	3:00
Loses the True4U 115 lbs title and fails to capture the vacant Rajadamnern Stadium 115 lbs title.
2022-01-28	Win	(Thailand) Oleylek Sor.Kianjai	Petchyindee Muaymanwansuk, Rangsit Stadium	Rangsit, Thailand	Decision (unanimous)	5	3:00
Defends the True4U 115 lbs title.
2021-12-24	Win	(Thailand) Chokpanlan Por.Lakboon	Petchyindee True4U Muaymanwansuk, Rangsit Stadium	Rangsit, Thailand	Decision	5	3:00
Wins the vacant True4U 115 lbs title and a 1 million baht side-bet.
2021-11-11	Win	(Thailand) Chokpanlan Por.Lakboon	Petchyindee + Muay Thai Moradok Kon Thai	Buriram Province, Thailand	KO (left elbow)	4	
2021-09-30	Win	(Thailand) Satanmuanglek PetchyindeeAcademy	Petchyindee	Buriram, Thailand	Decision	5	3:00
2021-03-12	Win	(Thailand) Praewprao PetchyindeeAcademy	True4U Muaymanwansuk, Rangsit Stadium	Rangsit, Thailand	Decision	5	3:00
2020-11-20	Win	(Thailand) Mahasamut Moopingaroichungbey	Muaymanwansuk, Rangsit Stadium	Rangsit, Thailand	Decision	5	3:00
2020-10-23	Win	(Thailand) Fourwil Sitjaroensap	Muaymanwansuk, Rangsit Stadium	Rangsit, Thailand	Decision	5	3:00
2020-10-09	Win	(Thailand) Dinnuetong Dabpong191	Muaymanwansuk, Rangsit Stadium	Rangsit, Thailand	TKO (Doctor Stoppage)	3	
2020-09-04	Win	(Thailand) Kongburapha Thiptamai	Muaymanwansuk, Rangsit Stadium	Rangsit, Thailand	KO (Knee to the body)	3	
2020-07-10	Loss	(Thailand) Kongburapha Thiptamai	Muaymanwansuk, Rangsit Stadium	Rangsit, Thailand	Decision	5	3:00
2020-02-20	Win	(Thailand) Dechpet Sakwichian	Petchyindee, Rajadamnern Stadium	Bangkok, Thailand	Decision	5	3:00
2020-01-24	Win	(Thailand) Petchdet Sakwichian	Sirilak Muay Thai, Lumpinee Stadium	Bangkok, Thailand	Decision	5	3:00
2019-12-08	Win	(Japan) Ryuya Okuwaki	BOM 2-6 - Battle Of Muaythai SEASON II vol.6	Tokyo, Japan	Decision (Majority)	5	3:00
Wins the vacant WPMF World Light Flyweight title.
2019-11-01	Win	(Thailand) Yoddkla Isantrakter	Muay Thai T1, Lumpinee Stadium	Bangkok, Thailand	Decision	5	3:00
Wins the True4U 108 lbs title.
2019-09-23	Win	(Thailand) BoyUbon Ansukhumwit	Petchyindee, Rajadamnern Stadium	Bangkok, Thailand	Decision	5	3:00
2019-08-08	Loss	(Thailand) Detphet Wor.Sangprapai	Wanmeechai, Rajadamnern Stadium	Bangkok, Thailand	TKO (Punches)	2	
2019-03-26	Loss	(Thailand) Komkiat Kiatfoofueng	Kiatpetch, Channel 7 Stadium	Bangkok, Thailand	Decision	5	3:00
2019-02-10	Win	(Thailand) Phetsaeksan Thungpananyangthong	Channel 7 Stadium	Bangkok, Thailand	Decision	5	3:00
2018-11-09	Loss	(Thailand) Rachadet TN Muaythai	Phetkiatpetch, Lumpinee Stadium	Bangkok, Thailand	Decision	5	3:00
2018-08-31	Win	(Thailand) Mahasamut Tor.Piewlopakdee	Phetkiatpetch, Lumpinee Stadium	Bangkok, Thailand	Decision	5	3:00
2018-08-07	Win	(Thailand) Thudsakan Rakchat	Phetkiatpetch, Lumpinee Stadium	Bangkok, Thailand	Decision	5	3:00
2018-04-29	Win	(Thailand) Petch-Aek Kiatjamroon	Channel 7 Stadium	Bangkok, Thailand	Decision	5	3:00
2018-02-04	Win	(Thailand) Prakaipetch Mupingaroichungbey	Jitmuangnon Stadium	Nonthaburi province, Thailand	KO	2	
Legend: Win Loss Draw/No contest Notes
