= Diesellek Wor.Wanchai =

Thai Muay Thai fighter

Diesellek
- Born: Supawat Songkong; April 21, 1999 (age 27); Trang Province, Thailand
- Other names: Diesellek Petchyindee Academy (ดีเซลเล็ก เพชรยินดีอคาดีมี่); Diesellek BuildJC (ดีเซลเล็ก บิ้วเจซี)
- Height: 167 cm (5 ft 5 1/2 in)
- Weight: 55 kg (121 lb; 8.7 st)
- Style: Muay Thai
- Stance: Orthodox
- Fighting out of: Bangkok, Thailand
- Team: Petchyindee Academy

Diesellek Wor.Wanchai (ดีเซลเล็ก ว.วันชัย) is a Thai Muay Thai fighter.

== Career ==
Diesellek started his fighting career in his native Trang province at the age of 8. He was initially trained by his father alongside his brother Singsayan who became WBC Youth World Super Flyweight champion.

Diesellek travelled to Tokyo, Japan to face Satsuma3373 at Wanchai Muay Thai Super Fight on October 9, 2016. He won by technical knockout with elbow strikes in the fourth round.

On March 3, 2017, Diesellek defeated Chopper Kor.Saphaothong by decision. Later that year Diesellek took part in the True4U Paedprakan tournament. In the semifinals, happening on June 30, he was defeated by Satanmuanglek Numpponthep. On June 2, Diesellek defeated Thongnoi Lukbanyai by split decision in the fight for the third place.

Diesellek was matched with top fighter Puenkon Tor.Surat with a side-bet of a million baht on October 25, 2018. Diesellek pulled off the upset and defeated Puenkon by decision.

After defeating Theptaksin Sor.Sornsing by decision on April 4, 2019, Diesellek was matched up with Rungnarai Kiatmuu9 who was considered the most dominant fighter in his division. The fight would happen on June 7, 2019, with the True4U 118 lbs belt at stake. He lost the bout by decision. Diesellek defeated Theptaksin Sor.Sornsing by decision a second time on September 13, 2019. Diesellek's success earned him a shot at the reigning WBC Muay Thai 122 lbs world champion Kumandoi Petcharoenvit on October 14, 2019. He lost the fight by decision. Diesellek went on to lose his next three fights by decision to Saotho Sitchefboontham, Saoek Sitchefboontham and in January 2020 to Gaipa 13Rienresort.

Following the series of losses, the COVID-19 pandemic of 2020 forced Diesellek away from the rings for 14 months. During this time he enlisted in the army.

Diesellek was scheduled to face Saotho Or.Atchariya for the vacant True4U 122 lbs title at Rangsit Stadium. He won the fight by decision to capture the belt. The first defense of his title was scheduled on March 17, 2022, against Saotho's twin brother Saoek Or.Atchariya. He won the fight by decision. They rematched on October 20, 2022, at Rajadamnern Stadium in a non-title fight. The fight ended in a draw

Diesellek Wor.Wanchai was scheduled to make his kickboxing rules debut against Shiro for the inaugural RISE Bantamweight World Championship at RISE ELDORADO 2023 on March 26, 2023. He lost the fight by a fifth-round knockout.

== Titles and accomplishments ==
- Petchyindee True4U/Pryde TV
  - 2021 True4U Super Bantamweight (122 lbs) Champion
    - Four successful title defenses

== Fight record ==
Muay Thai record
Date	Result	Opponent	Event	Location	Method	Round	Time
2026-11-22		(Thailand) Wuttikorn Suannamtankiri	TorNamThai Kiatpetch TKO + Deer Kiatpetch Birthday, Rajadamnern Stadium	Bangkok, Thailand			
2026-10-08	Loss	(Thailand) Kompetch Sitsarawatsuer	Petchyindee, Rajadamnern Stadium	Bangkok, Thailand	Decision	5	3:00
2026-09-04	Win	(Thailand) Puenyai Por.Lakboon	Petchyindee, Rajadamnern Stadium	Bangkok, Thailand	Decision	5	3:00
2026-07-16	Win	(Thailand) Petchmongkol SamartPayakaroonGym	Petchyindee, Rajadamnern Stadium	Bangkok, Thailand	Decision	5	3:00
2026-06-18	Win	(Thailand) Petchmongkol SamartPayakaroonGym	Petchyindee, Rajadamnern Stadium	Bangkok, Thailand	Decision	5	3:00
2026-04-23	Win	(Thailand) Kaenchai PandakRattanaburi	Petchyindee, Rajadamnern Stadium	Bangkok, Thailand	Decision	5	3:00
2026-03-05	Loss	(Thailand) Sadaothong NuisimumMueang	Petchyindee, Rajadamnern Stadium	Bangkok, Thailand	Decision	5	3:00
2026-01-15	Loss	(Thailand) CaptainTeam AdsanPatong	Petchyindee, Rajadamnern Stadium	Bangkok, Thailand	Decision	5	3:00
2025-12-11	Win	(Thailand) Petchsithong Sor.Saknarin	Petchyindee, Rajadamnern Stadium	Bangkok, Thailand	KO	3	
2025-09-27	Loss	(Thailand) Khunsueknoi Boomdeksian	Rajadamnern World Series	Bangkok, Thailand	KO (High kick)	2	0:36
2025-07-26	Win	(Iran) Majid Karimi	Rajadamnern World Series	Bangkok, Thailand	Decision (Unanimous)	3	3:00
2025-05-08	Loss	(Thailand) Dokmaipa TopPrairieGym	Petchyindee, Rajadamnern Stadium	Bangkok, Thailand	KO (Right hook)	2	3:00
Loses the PRYDE TV/True4U 122 lbs title.
2025-04-03	Win	(Thailand) Puenyai Por.Lakboon	Petchyindee, Rajadamnern Stadium	Bangkok, Thailand	KO (Elbow)	3	
Defends the PRYDE TV/True4U 122 lbs title.
2025-01-16	Loss	(Thailand) Ratchadet T.N.Muaythai	Petchyindee, Rajadamnern Stadium	Bangkok, Thailand	Decision	5	3:00
2024-12-05	Win	(Thailand) Ekkalak Sor.Samangarment	Petchyindee, Rajadamnern Stadium	Bangkok, Thailand	Decision	5	3:00
2024-10-10	Loss	(Thailand) Wuttikorn Suannamthankiri	Petchyindee, Rajadamnern Stadium	Bangkok, Thailand	Decision	5	3:00
2024-08-22	Win	(Thailand) Petchthailand Or.Kitkasem	Petchyindee, Rajadamnern Stadium	Bangkok, Thailand	Decision	5	3:00
2024-07-04	Loss	(Thailand) Rittidet Lukjaoporongtom	Petchyindee + Kiatpetch, Rajadamnern Stadium	Bangkok, Thailand	Decision	5	3:00
2024-03-24	Win	(Thailand) Petchsila Wor.Auracha	Ruamponkon Rak Nai Noi	Pattani province, Thailand	Decision	5	3:00
2024-02-15	Loss	(Thailand) Petchpailin SorJor.Tongprajin	Muaymansananmuang Sarakham	Maha Sarakham province, Thailand	Decision	5	3:00
2023-12-27	Loss	(Thailand) Petchsamarn Sor.Samarngarment	Rajadamnern Stadium 78th Birthday Show	Bangkok, Thailand	Decision	5	3:00
2023-10-03	Win	(Thailand) Petchmuangsuang Gor.Soytan	Muaymansananmuang, Rangsit Stadium	Pathum Thani, Thailand	Decision	5	3:00
Defends the True4U 122 lbs title.
2023-09-03	Loss	(Thailand) Petchsamarn Sor.Samarngarment	Channel 7 Stadium	Bangkok, Thailand	Decision	5	3:00
2023-07-08	Win	(Spain) Mikel Fernández	Rajadamnern World Series	Bangkok, Thailand	TKO (High kick + punches)	2	
2023-05-26	Win	(Thailand) Petchsila Wor.Auracha	Petchyindee True4U, Rangsit Stadium	Pathum Thani, Thailand	Decision (Unanimous)	5	3:00
Defends the True4U 122 lbs title.
2023-04-27	Win	(Thailand) Saoek Or.Atchariya	Petchyindee, Rajadamnern Stadium	Bangkok, Thailand	Decision	5	3:00
2023-03-26	Loss	(Japan) Shiro	RISE ELDORADO 2023	Tokyo, Japan	KO (High kick)	5	2:38
For the inaugural RISE Bantamweight World title.
2022-11-18	Draw	(Thailand) Kongchai Chanaidonmuang	Ruamponkon + Prachin	Prachinburi province, Thailand	Decision (Split)	5	3:00
2022-10-20	Draw	(Thailand) Saoek Or.Atchariya	Petchyindee, Rajadamnern Stadium	Bangkok, Thailand	Decision	5	3:00
2022-08-11	Loss	(Thailand) Phetpailin Sor.Jor.Tongprachin	Petchyindee, Rajadamnern Stadium	Bangkok, Thailand	Decision	5	3:00
2022-07-08	Win	(Thailand) Nakarat Petchnaka	Muaymanwansuk, Rangsit Stadium	Bangkok, Thailand	Decision	5	3:00
2022-05-06	Loss	(Thailand) Longern Dabransarakham	Muaymanwansuk, Rangsit Stadium	Bangkok, Thailand	Decision	5	3:00
2022-03-17	Win	(Thailand) Saoek Or.Atchariya	Petchyindee True4U, Rajadamnern Stadium	Bangkok, Thailand	Decision	5	3:00
Defends the True4U 122 lbs title.
2021-11-25	Win	(Thailand) Saotho Or.Atchariya	Petchyindee True4U, Rangsit Stadium	Rangsit, Thailand	Decision	5	3:00
Wins the vacant True4U 122 lbs title and the 200,000 baht side-bet.
2021-10-14	Loss	(Thailand) Kumandoi Petcharoenvit	Petchyindee + Muay Thai Moradok Kon Thai	Buriram Province, Thailand	Decision	5	3:00
2021-04-09	Win	(Thailand) DonKing Kiatnadee	Petchyindee Road Show	Songkhla, Thailand	Decision	5	3:00
2021-03-13	Loss	(Thailand) Puenkon Tor.Surat	Majujaya Muay Thai	Pattani, Thailand	Decision	5	3:00
2020-01-27	Loss	(Thailand) Gaipa 13Rienresort	Petchyindee, Rajadamnern Stadium	Bangkok, Thailand	Decision	5	3:00
2019-12-23	Loss	(Thailand) Saoek Sitchefboontham	Sitchefboontham + Rajadamnern Stadium Anniversary	Bangkok, Thailand	Decision	5	3:00
2019-11-21	Loss	(Thailand) Saotho Sitchefboontham	Rajadamnern Stadium	Bangkok, Thailand	Decision	5	3:00
2019-10-14	Loss	(Thailand) Kumandoi Petcharoenvit	Rajadamnern Stadium	Bangkok, Thailand	Decision	5	3:00
2019-09-13	Win	(Thailand) Thepthaksin Sor.Sornsing	Petchpiya, Lumpinee Stadium	Bangkok, Thailand	Decision	5	3:00
2019-08-08	Draw	(Thailand) Thepthaksin Sor.Sornsing	Wanmeechai, Rajadamnern Stadium	Bangkok, Thailand	Decision	5	3:00
2019-06-07	Loss	(Thailand) Rungnarai Kiatmuu9	Muaymanwansuk + Petchpiya Lumpinee Stadium	Bangkok, Thailand	Decision	5	3:00
For the True4u 118 lbs title.
2019-04-04	Win	(Thailand) Thepthaksin Sor.Sornsing	Petchyindee, Rajadamnern Stadium	Bangkok, Thailand	Decision	5	3:00
2019-01-30	Win	(Thailand) Jakdao Witsanukonkan	Wanmeechai, Rajadamnern Stadium	Bangkok, Thailand	Decision	5	3:00
2018-12-26	Win	(Thailand) Wanchalong PK.Saenchai	Rajadamnern Stadium	Bangkok, Thailand	Decision	5	3:00
2018-10-25	Win	(Thailand) Puenkon Tor.Surat	Rajadamnern Stadium	Bangkok, Thailand	Decision	5	3:00
Wins the 1.3 million baht side-bet.
2018-09-13	Win	(Thailand) Nongyot Sitjekan	Petchyindee, Rajadamnern Stadium	Bangkok, Thailand	Decision	5	3:00
2018-08-16	Win	(Thailand) Chamuekphet Sor.Weeradet	Jitmuangnon, Rajadamnern Stadium	Bangkok, Thailand	TKO (Kicks)	3	
2018-07-05	Loss	(Thailand) Raktemroy Visootjaroenyon	Petchyindee, Rajadamnern Stadium	Bangkok, Thailand	Decision	5	3:00
2018-06-07	Loss	(Thailand) Buakawlek Or.Boonchob	Petchyindee, Rajadamnern Stadium	Bangkok, Thailand	Decision	5	3:00
2018-04-04	Win	(Thailand) Kaipa 13Rienresort	Petchyindee, Rajadamnern Stadium	Bangkok, Thailand	Decision	5	3:00
2018-04-04	Draw	(Thailand) Pangtor Por.Lakboon	Tor.Chaiwat, Rajadamnern Stadium	Bangkok, Thailand	Decision	5	3:00
2018-02-08	Loss	(Thailand) Phetsomjit Jitmuangnon	Rajadamnern Stadium	Bangkok, Thailand	Decision	5	3:00
2017-12-29	Win	(Thailand) Ngaopayak Or Bor Tor.NonThong	Paedriew, Lumpinee Stadium	Bangkok, Thailand	Decision	5	3:00
2017-11-29	Win	(Thailand) Offsait Sor.Jor.Wichitmuangpadriew	Petchyindee, Rajadamnern Stadium	Bangkok, Thailand	Decision	5	3:00
2017-11-06	Loss	(Thailand) Lookkwan Sor.Jor.Wowpadriw	Jitmuangnon, Rajadamnern Stadium	Bangkok, Thailand	Decision	5	3:00
2017-09-20	Win	(Thailand) Phetsomjit Jitmuangnon	Rajadamnern Stadium	Bangkok, Thailand	Decision	5	3:00
2017-08-28	Loss	(Thailand) Priewpak Sor.Jor.Wichitpaedriew	Petchyindee, Rajadamnern Stadium	Bangkok, Thailand	Decision	5	3:00
2017-08-04	Win	(Thailand) Tongnoy Lukbanyai	Rangsit Stadium	Rangsit, Thailand	Decision	5	3:00
2017-06-30	Loss	(Thailand) Satanmuanglek Numpponthep	True4U Muaymanwansuk, Rangsit Stadium	Rangsit, Thailand	Decision	5	3:00
2017-06-02	Win	(Thailand) Tongnoy Lukbanyai	Muaymanwansuk, Rangsit Stadium	Rangsit, Thailand	Decision	5	3:00
2017-05-05	Win	(Thailand) Rit Jitmuangnon	Muaymanwansuk, Rangsit Stadium	Rangsit, Thailand	Decision	5	3:00
2017-04-05	Loss	(Thailand) Wanchai Kiatmuu9	Petchyindee	Thailand	Decision	5	3:00
2017-03-03	Win	(Thailand) Chopper Kor.Saphaothong	Muaymanwansuk, Rangsit Stadium	Rangsit, Thailand	Decision	5	3:00
2017-02-06	Loss	(Thailand) Tongnoy Lukbanyai	Wan Kinghtong, Rajadamnern Stadium	Bangkok, Thailand	Decision	5	3:00
2017-01-05	Win	(Thailand) Charoenporn Poptheeratham	Petchyindee, Rajadamnern Stadium	Bangkok, Thailand	Decision	5	3:00
2016-11-28	Loss	(Thailand) Offside Wichitpadriew	Phetwiset, Rajadamnern Stadium	Bangkok, Thailand	Decision	5	3:00
2016-10-09	Win	(Japan) Satsuma3373	Suk Wanchai Muay Thai Super Fight	Tokyo, Japan	TKO (Elbows)	4	1:31
2016-07-14	Loss	(Thailand) Yoktong Pinsinchai	Phetwiset, Rajadamnern Stadium	Bangkok, Thailand	Decision	5	3:00
2016-06-19	Win	(Thailand) Mike Sitjesairung	Rangsit Stadium	Bangkok, Thailand	Decision	5	3:00
2016-05-23	Win	(Thailand) Tumkeaw Koonpanpasak	Phetwiset, Rajadamnern Stadium	Bangkok, Thailand	Decision	5	3:00
2016-04-16	Loss	(Thailand) Mike Sitjesairung	Siam Omnoi Stadium	Samut Sakhon, Thailand	Decision	5	3:00
2016-03-05	Loss	(Thailand) Luktoy FA.Group	Siam Omnoi Stadium	Samut Sakhon, Thailand	Decision	5	3:00
2016-01-21	Loss	(Thailand) Luktoy FA.Group	Phetwiset, Rajadamnern Stadium	Bangkok, Thailand	Decision	5	3:00
2015-11-30	Loss	(Thailand) Pudpadlek Luknognaen	Wan Kingthong, Rajadamnern Stadium	Bangkok, Thailand	KO	3	
2015-10-15	Win	(Thailand) Phetpangan Mor.Ratanabandit	PhetWiset, Rajadamnern Stadium	Bangkok, Thailand	Decision	5	3:00
2015-09-08	Win	(Thailand) Numtrangnoi Singhapomprab	Weerapol, Rajadamnern Stadium	Bangkok, Thailand	Decision	5	3:00
Legend: Win Loss Draw/No contest Notes

Amateur Muay Thai record
Date	Result	Opponent	Event	Location	Method	Round	Time
2024-06-03	Loss	(Armenia) Narek Khachikyan	IFMA 2024 World Championships, Quarterfinals	Patras, Greece	Decision (30:27)	3	3:00
Legend: Win Loss Draw/No contest Notes
