= Samingdam Chor.Ajalaboon =

Thai Muay Thai fighter

Samingdam
- Born: Tathaput Tumthong; January 6, 1999 (age 27); Nong Bua Lamphu Province, Thailand
- Other names: Samingdam Miamicondobangpu (สมิงดำ ไมอามี่คอนโดบางปู); Samingdam Chor.Hapayak
- Height: 173 cm (5 ft 8 in)
- Weight: 59.0 kg (130.1 lb; 9.29 st)
- Fighting out of: Pathum Thani Province, Thailand
- Team: PK.Saenchai; Chor.Hapayak; Sor.Sommai
- Trainer: Sittisak Chor.Waikul

Samingdam Chor.Ajalaboon (Thai: สมิงดำ ฉ.อจลบุญ), is a Thai Muay Thai fighter.

== Biography and career ==
On October 26, 2019, Samingdam defeated Yodbuadaneg Sirilakmuaythai by decision and captured the vacant Omnoi Stadium Super Bantamweight title.

Samingdam defended his Omnoi title on July 4, 2020, against Phetsuntree Jitmuangon. He won the fight by decision.

On October 17, 2020, Samingdam defeated Suriyanlek Aor.Bor.Tor.Kampee by decision on Jitmuangnon Fights at the Or.Tor.Gor.3 Stadium.

Samingdam entered the 2021 year having won 7 of his last 8 fights, becoming notable in the eyes of a major promotor in Kiatpetch. On October 24, 2021, Samingdam earned the biggest win of his career when he defeated a former Lumpinee Stadium Fighter of the Year Ronachai Tor.Ramintra at the channel 7 Stadium. The dominant decision win over a top fighter impressed the Muay Thai community. Samingdam received a 50,000 baht bonus from the P.K.Saenchai Gym owner who expressed his wish to see him compete in ONE Championship. Less than two weeks after this win the Sports Authority of Thailand announced that Samingdam was among the 6 fighters shortlisted for their prestigious Fighter of the Year award.

On January 8, 2021, Samingdam was matched with premier knee fighter Yothin FA Group at the Omnoi Stadium for the vacant IMC Featherweight title. Not considered favorite Samingdam was allowed to weigh in 2 lbs higher than his opponenent. Samingdam won by unanimous decision and solidified his position as one of the best pound-for-pound fighters in Thailand.

As of January 10, 2021 Samingdam was the #1 ranked featherweight muay thai fighter in the world by the WMO.

== Titles and accomplishments ==
- Omnoi Stadium
  - 2019 Omnoi Stadium 122 lbs Champion (defended once)
- International Muay Thai Council
  - 2021 IMC World Featherweight Champion
- International Federation of Muaythai Associations
  - 2022 IFMA World Championships U-23 −60 kg (gold)
- Professional Boxing Association of Thailand (PAT)
  - 2022 Thailand 130 lbs Champion
- Awards
  - 2021 Channel 7 Boxing Stadium Fan favorite Fighter

== Muay Thai record ==
Muay Thai record
Date	Result	Opponent	Event	Location	Method	Round	Time
2026-11-07	Win	(Iran) Saman Torkan	Rajadamnern World Series, Rajadamnern Stadium	Bangkok, Thailand	TKO (referee stoppage)	2	
2026-08-08	Win	(Morocco) Mouhannad Latmi	Rajadamnern World Series, Rajadamnern Stadium	Bangkok, Thailand	Decision (Unanimous)	3	3:00
2025-10-05	Loss	(Thailand) Petchkitti Sor.Jaruwan	TorNamThai Kiatpetch TKO, Rajadamnern Stadium	Bangkok, Thailand	KO	3	
2025-08-17	Win	(Thailand) Sing Sor.Chokmeechai	TorNamThai Kiatpetch TKO, Rajadamnern Stadium	Bangkok, Thailand	KO	3	
2025-03-15	Loss	(Israel) Ruach Gordon	Rajadamnern World Series	Bangkok, Thailand	KO (Elbow)	2	
2025-01-11	Win	(Thailand) Yodkhunsuek Mor.Ratchapatjombung	Rajadamnern World Series	Bangkok, Thailand	Decision (Split)	3	3:00
2024-11-23	Win	(United States) Jalil Barnes	Rajadamnern World Series	Bangkok, Thailand	Decision (Unanimous)	3	3:00
2024-09-21	Win	(England) Owen Gilis	Rajadamnern World Series, Rajadamnern Stadium	Bangkok, Thailand	Decision (Unanimous)	3	3:00
2024-08-24	Win	(Brazil) Israel Dos Santos	Rajadamnern World Series	Bangkok, Thailand	Decision (Unanimous)	3	3:00
2024-05-30	Loss	(Thailand) Yodtong SorJor.TongPrachin	Petchyindee, Rajadamnern Stadium	Bangkok, Thailand	TKO (Referee Stoppage)	3	
2024-03-17	Loss	(Thailand) Petch Parunchai	Channel 7 Stadium	Bangkok, Thailand	KO (Elbow)	3	
2023-11-03	Win	(Thailand) Denkriangkrai SinghaMawynn	ONE Friday Fights 39	Bangkok, Thailand	Decision (Unanimous)	3	3:00
2023-05-26	Win	(Thailand) Mahamongkol MoveonChiangmai	ONE Friday Fights 18, Lumpinee Stadium	Bangkok, Thailand	Decision (Unanimous)	3	3:00
2023-03-03	Win	(Thailand) Ritthidet Sor.Sommai	ONE Friday Fights 7, Lumpinee Stadium	Bangkok, Thailand	TKO (punches)	2	0:11
2023-01-29	Loss	(Thailand) Ronachai Tor.Ramintra	TorNamThai Kiatpetch TKO, Rajadamnern Stadium	Bangkok, Thailand	Decision	5	3:00
2022-12-19	Loss	(Thailand) TomYamGoong SorSor.Pakorn	Nakhon Phanom Super Fight + Chang Muay Thai Kiatpetch	Nakhon Phanom province, Thailand	Decision	5	3:00
2022-10-20	Loss	(Thailand) Sam-A Gaiyanghadao	Petchyindee, Rajadamnern Stadium	Bangkok, Thailand	Decision	5	3:00
2022-08-29	Win	(Thailand) Nawaek SitChefBoontham	Muay Thai Pantamit, Thupatemi Stadium	Bangkok, Thailand	Decision	5	3:00
Wins Thailand 130 lbs title.
2022-07-24	Win	(Thailand) Nungubon Sitchefboontham	Channel 7 Stadium	Bangkok, Thailand	Decision	5	3:00
2022-05-04	Loss	(Thailand) Yothin FA Group	Muay Thai Palangmai, Rajadamnern Stadium	Bangkok, Thailand	Decision	5	3:00
2022-02-13	Loss	(Thailand) Kompetch Sitsarawatsuer	Channel 7 Stadium	Bangkok, Thailand	Decision	5	3:00
For the Channel 7 Boxing Stadium 126 lbs title.
2022-01-08	Win	(Thailand) Yothin FA Group	Suk Jao Muay Thai, Omnoi Stadium	Samut Sakhon, Thailand	Decision (Unanimous)	5	3:00
Wins the vacant IMC World Featherweight title.
2021-10-24	Win	(Thailand) Ronachai Tor.Ramintra	Channel 7 Stadium	Bangkok, Thailand	Decision	5	3:00
2021-02-21	Win	(Thailand) Petchrungruang Aodtukdang	Channel 7 Stadium	Bangkok, Thailand	Decision	5	3:00
2020-10-17	Win	(Thailand) Suriyanlek Aor.Bor.Tor.Kampee	Jitmuangnon, Or.Tor.Gor.3 Stadium	Nonthaburi, Thailand	Decision	5	3:00
2020-09-05	Win	(Thailand) Detchaiya Petchyindee	Jao Muay Thai, Siam Omnoi Stadium	Bangkok, Thailand	Decision	5	3:00
2020-08-01	Win	(Thailand) Theptaksin Sor.Sornsing	Jao Muay Thai, Siam Omnoi Stadium	Bangkok, Thailand	Decision	5	3:00
2020-07-04	Win	(Thailand) Petchsuntree Jitmuangnon	Jao Muay Thai, Omnoi Stadium	Bangkok, Thailand	Decision	5	3:00
Defends the Omnoi Stadium 122 lbs title.
2020-01-28	Win	(Thailand) Phetmuangsee Aodtukdang	Tded99, Lumpinee Stadium	Bangkok, Thailand	KO (Right Elbow)	4	
2020-01-02	Loss	(Thailand) Saksit Tor.Paopiamsapaedriew	Petchyindee, Rajadamnern Stadium	Bangkok, Thailand	Decision	5	3:00
2019-11-26	Win	(Thailand) Detchaiya Petchyindee	Sukhothai, Lumpinee Stadium	Bangkok, Thailand	TKO (Referee Stoppage)	5	
2019-10-26	Win	(Thailand) Yodbuadaeng SiriliakMuaythai	Jao Muay Thai, Omnoi Stadium	Bangkok, Thailand	Decision	5	3:00
Wins the Omnoi Stadium 122 lbs title.
2019-09-25	Draw	(Thailand) Hercules Phetsimean	Petchwittaya, Rajadamnern Stadium	Bangkok, Thailand	Decision	5	3:00
2019-08-22	Loss	(Thailand) Yodkhunsuk Mor.Rajabatchombung	Sor.Sommai, Rajadamnern Stadium	Bangkok, Thailand	KO (Left hook to the body)	2	
2019-07-29	Win	(Thailand) Saoek Sitchefboontham	Sor.Sommai, Rajadamnern Stadium	Bangkok, Thailand	Decision	5	3:00
2019-05-24	Loss	(Thailand) Pompetch Sor.Jor.Tongprachin	Wan Chaichana, Lumpinee Stadium	Bangkok, Thailand	Decision	5	3:00
2019-04-13	Loss	(Thailand) Yodbuadaeng SiriliakMuaythai	Jao Muay Thai, Omnoi Stadium	Bangkok, Thailand	Decision	5	3:00
2019-02-27	Loss	(Thailand) Peankon Diamond98	Petchchaopraya, Rajadamnern Stadium	Bangkok, Thailand	Decision	5	3:00
2018-12-20	Win	(Thailand) Yodkhunsuk Mor.Rajabatchombung	Sor.Sommai, Rajadamnern Stadium	Bangkok, Thailand	Decision	5	3:00
2018-11-29	Win	(Thailand) Peankon Diamond98	Sor.Sommai, Rajadamnern Stadium	Bangkok, Thailand	Decision	5	3:00
2018-10-18	Win	(Thailand) Phetseemok P.K.Saenchaimuaythaigym	Sor.Sommai, Rajadamnern Stadium	Bangkok, Thailand	Decision	5	3:00
2018-09-12	Loss	(Thailand) Somraknoi Muay789	Tor.Chaiwat, Rajadamnern Stadium	Bangkok, Thailand	Decision	5	3:00
2018-08-11	Win	(Thailand) Yodbuadaeng SiriliakMuaythai	Jao Muay Thai, Omnoi Stadium	Bangkok, Thailand	Decision	5	3:00
2018-07-19	Loss	(Thailand) Saotho Sitchefboontham	Rajadamnern Stadium	Bangkok, Thailand	Decision	5	3:00
2018-05-07	Win	(Thailand) Rajasee IT2000	Bangrachan, Rajadamnern Stadium	Bangkok, Thailand	Decision	5	3:00
2018-04-05	Win	(Thailand) Kedkaw Nawyandaman	Sor.Sommai, Rajadamnern Stadium	Bangkok, Thailand	Decision	5	3:00
2018-03-14	Loss	(Thailand) Saoek Sitchefboontham	Tor.Chaiwat, Rajadamnern Stadium	Bangkok, Thailand	Decision	5	3:00
2018-02-03	Win	(Thailand) Kumantong Jitmuangnon	Jao Muay Thai, Omnoi Stadium	Bangkok, Thailand	Decision	5	3:00
2018-01-08	Win	(Thailand) Phetsukumwit Or.Daokrajai	Jitmuangnon, Rajadamnern Stadium	Bangkok, Thailand	Decision	5	3:00
2017-12-18	Win	(Thailand) Suemit Sursuraj	Bangrachan, Rajadamnern Stadium	Bangkok, Thailand	TKO (Right Elbow)	2	
2017-11-26	Win	(Thailand) Kaipayak Chor.Hapayak	Muay Dee Vithithai, Rangsit Stadium	Rangsit, Thailand	Decision	5	3:00
2017-08-30	Loss	(Thailand) Yodmanoot Pumphanmuang	Sor.Sommai, Rajadamnern Stadium	Bangkok, Thailand	KO (Knee to the body)	3	
2017-07-19	Loss	(Thailand) Nuengpichit PetchparaAcademy	Sor.Sommai, Rajadamnern Stadium	Bangkok, Thailand	Decision	5	3:00
2017-06-17	Win	(Thailand) Komphetlek Sor.Jor.Motree	Jao Muay Thai, Omnoi Stadium	Bangkok, Thailand	TKO (Referee Stoppage)	4	
2017-05-15	Loss	(Thailand) Messi Pangkongprab	Sor.Sommai, Rajadamnern Stadium	Bangkok, Thailand	Decision	5	3:00
2017-04-10	Win	(Thailand) Ken Mor.Andaman	Petchchaopraya, Rajadamnern Stadium	Bangkok, Thailand	Decision	5	3:00
2017-03-17	Win	(Thailand) Kompayak Phetchaopraya	Sangmorakot, Lumpinee Stadium	Bangkok, Thailand	Decision	5	3:00
2017-02-15	Win	(Thailand) Phethevada B.S.J.Sungnoen	Chujaroen, Rajadamnern Stadium	Bangkok, Thailand	Decision	5	3:00
2017-01-23	Win	(Thailand) Nawaek Sitchefboontham	Chujaroen, Rajadamnern Stadium	Bangkok, Thailand	Decision	5	3:00
2016-11-24	Loss	(Thailand) Rajasee IT2000	Bangrachan, Rajadamnern Stadium	Bangkok, Thailand	KO (Straight Left)	3	
2016-09-29	Loss	(Thailand) Addum Teeded 99	Sor.Sommai, Rajadamnern Stadium	Bangkok, Thailand	Decision	5	3:00
2016-09-07	Win	(Thailand) Sangdaw Phetsimuen	Bangrachan, Rajadamnern Stadium	Bangkok, Thailand	TKO	3	
2016-08-09	Win	(Thailand) Nampongnoi Sor.Sommai	Phetwiset, Rajadamnern Stadium	Bangkok, Thailand	Decision	5	3:00
2016-07-17	Win	(Thailand) Phetsinin Sitboonmee	Rajadamnern Stadium	Bangkok, Thailand	Decision	5	3:00
2016-06-23	Win	(Thailand) Sanit Paesaysi	Petchchaopraya, Rajadamnern Stadium	Bangkok, Thailand	TKO	3	
2016-05-08	Loss	(Thailand) Phetchnadoon NanthipatKonsong	Rajadamnern Stadium	Bangkok, Thailand	Decision	5	3:00
2015-10-31	Win	(Thailand) Phetnamun Sor.Thanabowon	Krikkrai, Lumpinee Stadium	Bangkok, Thailand	TKO	3	
2015-08-23	Loss	(Thailand) Chamuakphet Sor.Trakruthong	Muay Dee Vithithai, Rangsit Stadium	Bangkok, Thailand	Decision	5	3:00
2015-07-04	Win	(Thailand) Timchai Nuysimunmuang	Krikkrai, Lumpinee Stadium	Bangkok, Thailand	TKO	5	
2015-06-06	Win	(Thailand) Montien Sitmonchai	Krikkrai, Lumpinee Stadium	Bangkok, Thailand	TKO	3	
Legend: Win Loss Draw/No contest Notes

Amateur Muay Thai Record
Date	Result	Opponent	Event	Location	Method	Round	Time
2022-06-03	Win	(Uzbekistan) Davlatshokh Shamsiev	IFMA World Championships 2022, Final	Abu Dhabi, United Arab Emirates	Decision (Split)	3	3:00
Wins 2022 IFMA World Championships U-23 -60kg Gold Medal.
2022-06-01	Win	(Saudi Arabia) Mohsen Alsibyani	IFMA World Championships 2022, Semi Finals	Abu Dhabi, United Arab Emirates	TKO (retirement)	2	
2022-05-31	Win	(France) Adrien Sautron	IFMA World Championships 2022, Quarter Finals	Abu Dhabi, United Arab Emirates	TKO (retirement)	2	
2022-05-29	Win	(Armenia) Vladislav Petrosyan	IFMA World Championships 2022, Second Round	Abu Dhabi, United Arab Emirates	Decision (Unanimous)	3	3:00
Legend: Win Loss Draw/No contest Notes
