= Chokdee PK.Saenchaimuaythaigym =

Thai Muay Thai fighter

Chokdee
- Born: May 18, 1994 (age 32); Thailand
- Other names: Chokdee Nuikafaeboran (โชคดี หนุ่ยกาแฟโบราณ)
- Nationality: Thai
- Height: 167 cm (5 ft 6 in)
- Weight: 53 kg (117 lb; 8.3 st)
- Stance: Orthodox
- Fighting out of: Bangkok, Thailand

Other information
- Notable relatives: Wanchalong PK.Saenchai (cousin)

Chokdee P.K.Saenchaimuaythaigym (โชคดี พี.เค.แสนชัยมวยไทยยิม) is a Thai Muay Thai fighter.

== Titles and accomplishments ==
- World Muaythai Council
  - 2018 WMC World Bantamweight Champion
- Channel 7 Stadium
  - 2019 Channel 7 Fight of the Year (vs Suesat Paeminburi)

== Fight record ==
Muay Thai Record
52 Wins (23 (T)KO's), 36 Losses, 4 Draws
Date	Result	Opponent	Event	Location	Method	Round	Time
2026-11-01		(Japan) Hiroyuki	Challenger 15	Tokyo, Japan			
2025-04-20	Win	(Japan) Jyosei Izumi	Road to Rajadamnern	Tokyo, Japan	TKO (Elbows)	2	
2024-06-15	Loss	(Japan) Issei SaenchaiGym	KNOCK OUT CARNIVAL 2024 SUPER BOUT “BLAZE”	Tokyo, Japan	TKO (Doctor stoppage)	3	0:55
2022-06-22	Loss	(Thailand) Yodsila Chor.Hapayak	Muay Thai Palangmai, Rajadamnern Stadium	Bangkok, Thailand	Decision	5	3:00
2022-05-18	Loss	(Thailand) Yodsila Chor.Hapayak	Muay Thai Palangmai, Rajadamnern Stadium	Bangkok, Thailand	Decision	5	3:00
2022-01-16	Loss	(Thailand) Ekalak Sor.Samangarment	Channel 7 Stadium	Bangkok, Thailand	Decision	5	3:00
2021-03-17	Loss	(Thailand) Mohawk Tded99	Rangsit Stadium	Thailand	Decision	5	3:00
2020-11-22	Loss	(Thailand) Ekwayu Mor BangkokThonburi	Or.Tor.Gor 3 Stadium	Nonthaburi, Thailand	TKO (Elbows)	3	
2020-09-06	Win	(Thailand) Yodpetch Pangkongprap	Channel 7 Stadium	Bangkok, Thailand	Decision	5	3:00
2020-03-06	Win	(Thailand) Petchrapa Sor.Sopit	Kiatpetch, Lumpinee Stadium	Bangkok, Thailand	Decision	5	3:00
2019-11-07	Loss	(Thailand) Petchrapa Sor.Sopit	Ruamponkon Prachin	Prachinburi, Thailand	Decision	5	3:00
2019-08-25	Loss	(Thailand) Suesat Paeminburi	Channel 7 Stadium	Bangkok, Thailand	Decision	5	3:00
2019-07-19	Loss	(Thailand) Petchsamarn Sor.Samarngarment	Muaymanwansuk + Kiatpetch, Lumpinee Stadium	Bangkok, Thailand	TKO (Doctor Stop/Cut)	3	
2019-05-10	Loss	(Thailand) Kompetch Sitsarawatsuer	Kiatpetch, Lumpinee Stadium	Bangkok, Thailand	Decision	5	3:00
For the vacant Lumpinee Stadium 118 lbs title.
2019-03-26	Win	(Thailand) Petchphusang KelaSport	OneParunchai + Kiatpetch	Nakhon Si Thammarat, Thailand	Decision	5	3:00
2019-02-11	Win	(Japan) Kazuki Osaki	KNOCK OUT 2019 WINTER	Tokyo, Japan	Decision (Unanimous)	5	3:00
2019-01-06	Win	(Thailand) Superjeng Sor.SamarnGarment	Channel 7 Stadium	Bangkok, Thailand	Decision	5	3:00
2018-09-23	Win	(Japan) Yudai Sasaki	Muay Lok 2018 CHALLENGE	Tokyo, Japan	KO (Left Hook)	1	2:20
Wins WMC World Bantamweight title.
2018-08-19	Draw	(Thailand) Satanfaa Moopingaroijoongbuey	Channel 7 Stadium	Bangkok, Thailand	Decision	5	3:00
2018-07-08	Win	(Thailand) Mangkorntong Sakburiram	Channel 7 Stadium	Bangkok, Thailand	KO	3	
2018-03-22	Loss	(Thailand) Petchphusang KelaSport		Thailand	Decision	5	3:00
2018-02-13	Loss	(Thailand) Petkaowang Aesapasung	Kiatpetch, Lumpinee Stadium	Bangkok, Thailand	Decision	5	3:00
2017-12-17	Draw	(Japan) Taiga Nakayama	The Battle Of Muaythai 16	Yokohama, Japan	Decision	5	3:00
2017-11-19	Loss	(Thailand) Jakdao Witsanukolkan	Lumpinee Stadium	Bangkok, Thailand	Decision	5	3:00
2017-09-05	Loss	(Thailand) Messi Pangkongprab	P.K.Saenchai, Lumpinee Stadium	Bangkok, Thailand	Decision	5	3:00
2017-06-20	Loss	(Thailand) Sprinter Pangkongprab	Kiatpetch, Lumpinee Stadium	Bangkok, Thailand	Decision	5	3:00
2017-05-23	Win	(Thailand) Teeto Hoywanpothchana	Lumpinee Stadium	Bangkok, Thailand	KO (Left Hook)	2	
2017-03-07	Win	(Thailand) Sprinter Pangkongprab	Lumpinee Champion + WanPranchai, Lumpinee Stadium	Bangkok, Thailand	Decision	5	3:00
2017-01-10	Win	(Thailand) Peankol Leknakhonsi	Phetmuangnon, Lumpinee Stadium	Bangkok, Thailand	Decision	5	3:00
2016-11-29	Loss	(Thailand) Kaokarat Jitmuangnon	Phetmuangnon, Lumpinee Stadium	Bangkok, Thailand	Decision	5	3:00
2016-09-18	Win	(Thailand) Jakdao Witsanukolkan	Channel 7 Stadium	Bangkok, Thailand	Decision	5	3:00
2016-08-06	Win	(Thailand) Petchphusang KelaSport	Channel 7 Stadium	Bangkok, Thailand	Decision	5	3:00
2016-06-05	Win	(Thailand) Kaokarat Jitmuangnon	Komchadluek Stadium	Thailand	KO (Left Hook)	3	
2016-04-26	Win	(Thailand) Ekwayu Mor.Krungthepthonburi	Pumphanmuang, Lumpinee Stadium	Bangkok, Thailand	Decision	5	3:00
2016-02-23	Win	(Thailand) Superjeng Peenaphat	Kiatpetch, Lumpinee Stadium	Bangkok, Thailand	Decision	5	3:00
2016-01-23	Loss	(Thailand) Superjeng Peenaphat	Lumpinee Stadium	Bangkok, Thailand	Decision	5	3:00
Legend: Win Loss Draw/No contest Notes
