= Khunsueknoi Boomdeksian =

Thai Muay Thai fighter

Khunsueknoi
- Born: Thossaporn Sripromma; June 7, 2005 (age 21); Nong Kung Si, Khon Kaen, Thailand
- Other names: Khunsuknoi UFABoomdeksian (ขุนศึกน้อย ยูฟ่าบูมเด็กเซียน) Khunsuknoy Boomdeksean
- Height: 168 cm (5 ft 6 in)
- Weight: 55 kg (121 lb; 8.7 st)
- Division: Light Flyweight; Flyweight; Super Flyweight; Bantamweight; Super Bantamweight
- Style: Muay Thai (Muay Femur)
- Stance: Orthodox
- Fighting out of: Bangkok, Thailand
- Team: Boomdeksian; Sor Sangthai
- Trainer: Kriengkrai Wansuep

Kickboxing record
- Total: 110
- Wins: 98
- Losses: 9
- By knockout: 1
- Draws: 3

Other information
- Notable relatives: Khunsueklek Boomdeksian (twin brother)

Thossaporn Sripromma (Thai: ทศพร ศรีพรมมา), known professionally as Khunsueknoi Boomdeksian (Thai: ขุนศึกน้อย บูมเด็กเซียน) is a Thai Muay Thai fighter. He is a former Rajadamnern Stadium Super Bantamweight Champion and the 2025 Sports Writers Association of Thailand Fighter of the Year.

== Biography and career ==
=== Early career ===
Totsapon Sriphromma was born on June 7, 2005, in the Khon Kaen province. He began training at the age of 9 alongside his twin brother Khunsueklek Boomdeksian under the teachings from local trainers of their village. At the age of 12 he was brought to the Boomdeksian gym, from there he fought all around the north eastern province and became the Isan region champion.

On July 18, 2022, Khunsueknoi defeated Petch-Ek Kiatjamroon by decision at the Thupatemi Stadium for the Muay Thai Pantamit promotion. This marked his 15th win in his last 16 bouts.

On October 3, 2022, Khunsueknoi faced Yodbuangam Luckybanthaeng for a 2 million baht side-bet. The fight ended in a draw. They rematched on November 20, 2022, at the Rajadamnern Stadium. He won the fight by decision.

Khunsueknoi made his kickboxing rules debut against Toki Tamaru at RISE 164 on January 28, 2023. He lost the fight by majority decision, with scores of 30–29, 29–29 and 30–28.

Khunsueknoi made his ONE Championship debut at ONE Friday Fights 8 against Numsurin Chor.Ketwina. He lost the fight by first-round knockout.

On October 21, 2023, Khunsueknoi travelled to Shenzhen,China, to face Nuengsiam at the EWD Championship event. He won the fight by first-round technical knockout.

On March 4, 2024, Khunsueknoi faced Rittidet Kiatsongrit for the Muay Thai Pantamit promotion at the Thupatemi Stadium. He won the fight by unanimous decision.

=== Rajadamnern World Series ===
On December 21, 2024, Khunsueknoi faced Peyman Zolfaghari on the Rajadamnern World Series promotion for the Rajadamnern Stadium anniversary show. He won the fight by unanimous decision.

On June 7, 2025, Khunsueknoi challenged Petchsamarn Sor.Samarngarment for his Rajadamnern Stadium Super Bantamweight title on a Rajadamnern World Series promoted show. He lost the fight by unanimous decision.

Khunsueknoi faced Diesellek Wor.Wanchai on Rajadamnern World Series on September 27, 2025. He won the fight by second-round knockout with a high kick.

On November 8, 2025, Khunsueknoi faced Maytee Sor.Toi.Paetriew for the interim Rajadamnern Stadium Super Bantamweight title. He won the fight by second-round knockout

On December 27, 2025, Khunsueknoi faced Petchsila Wor.Auracha for the Rajadamnern Stadium Super Bantamweight title on the Rajadamnern World Series promotion for the 80th anniversary show of the Rajadamnern Stadium. He won the fight by unanimous decision and took home the 1.5 million baht double bonus.

== Titles and accomplishments ==
- Rajadamnern Stadium
  - 2025 interim Rajadamnern Stadium Super Bantamweight (122 lbs) Champion
  - 2025 Rajadamnern Stadium Super Bantamweight (122 lbs) Champion
- Siam Omnoi Stadium
  - 2023 Omnoi Stadium Bantamweight (118 lbs) Champion
- Chomrom Muay Isan
  - Isan Region Champion

=== Amateur ===
- International Federation of Muaythai Associations
  - 2023 IFMA Youth World Championships U-23 -54 kg (bronze)

Awards

- 2025 Sports Authority of Thailand Muay Thai Fighter of the Year
- 2025 Sports Writers Association of Thailand Fighter of the Year

== Fight record ==
Muay Thai and Kickboxing Record
98 Wins, 10 Losses, 3 Draws
Date	Result	Opponent	Event	Location	Method	Round	Time
2026-10-31	Win	(Thailand) Siouey SinghaMawynn	Rajadamnern World Series	Bangkok, Thailand	Decision (unanimous)	3	3:00
2026-07-18	Loss	(Thailand) Mungkornlek Sor.Tanapon	Rajadamnern World Series	Bangkok, Thailand	Decision (unanimous)	3	3:00
2026-05-17	Win	(Morocco) Mouhannad Latmi	Rajadamnern World Series	Bangkok, Thailand	Decision (Unanimous)	3	3:00
2025-12-27	Win	(Thailand) Petchsila Wor.Auracha	Rajadamnern World Series, Rajadamnern Stadium 80th Anniversary	Bangkok, Thailand	Decision (Unanimous)	5	3:00
Wins the Rajadamnern Stadium Super Bantamweight (122 lbs) title.
2025-11-08	Win	(Thailand) Maytee Sor.Toi.Paetriew	Rajadamnern World Series	Bangkok, Thailand	KO (High kick)	2	1:55
Wins the interim Rajadamnern Stadium Super Bantamweight (122 lbs) title.
2025-09-27	Win	(Thailand) Diesellek Wor.Wanchai	Rajadamnern World Series	Bangkok, Thailand	KO (High kick)	2	0:36
2025-08-16	Win	(Thailand) Suesat ManopGym	Rajadamnern World Series	Bangkok, Thailand	Decision (Unanimous)	3	3:00
2025-07-09	Win	(Thailand) Suesat ManopGym	Muay Thai Palangmai, Rajadamnern Stadium	Bangkok, Thailand	Decision	5	3:00
2025-06-07	Loss	(Thailand) Petchsamarn Sor.Samarngarment	Rajadamnern World Series	Bangkok, Thailand	Decision (Unanimous)	5	3:00
For the Rajadamnern Stadium Super Bantamweight (122 lbs) title.
2025-04-21	Win	(Thailand) Thepthaksin Sor.Sorsing	Muay Thai Pantamit, Wangdee Stadium	Songkhla Province, Thailand	TKO (Referee stoppage)	4	
2024-12-21	Win	(Iran) Peyman Zolfaghari	Rajadamnern World Series, Rajadamnern Stadium Anniversary show	Bangkok, Thailand	Decision (Unanimous)	3	3:00
2024-09-23	Win	(Thailand) Boonchu Sor.Boonmeerit	Muay Thai Pantamit, Thupatemi Stadium	Pathum Thani, Thailand	Decision	5	3:00
2024-08-19	Win	(Thailand) Boonchu Sor.Boonmeerit	Muay Thai Pantamit, Thupatemi Stadium	Pathum Thani, Thailand	Decision	5	3:00
2024-03-04	Win	(Thailand) Rittidet Kiatsongrit	Muay Thai Pantamit, Thupatemi Stadium	Pathum Thani, Thailand	Decision (Unanimous)	5	3:00
2024-01-29	Win	(Thailand) Petchjakchan Chor.Hapayak	Muay Thai Pantamit, Thupatemi Stadium	Pathum Thani, Thailand	KO (High kick)	3	
2023-11-25	Win	(Thailand) Petchkangfah T.B.M.Gym	Fairtex Fight Road Show, Sor.Sommai + Jitmuangnon + P.K.Saenchai	Thailand	Decision	5	3:00
2023-10-21	Win	(Thailand) Nuengsiam	EWD Championship	Shenzhen, China	TKO (Punches)	1	3:00
2023-08-09	Loss	(Thailand) Mungkornlek Sor.Tanapon	Rajadamnern Stadium	Bangkok, Thailand	KO (Knee to the body)	3	1:08
2023-05-20	Win	(Thailand) Petchkongfah T.B.M.Gym	Omnoi Stadium	Samut Sakhon, Thailand	TKO (High kick)	5	
Wins the Omnoi Stadium Bantamweight (118 lbs) title.
2023-03-10	Loss	(Thailand) Numsurin Chor.Ketwina	ONE Friday Fights 8	Bangkok, Thailand	KO (Left hook)	1	2:38
2023-01-28	Loss	(Japan) Toki Tamaru	RISE 164	Tokyo, Japan	Decision (Majority)	3	3:00
2022-12-24	Win	(Thailand) Songchainoi Kiatsongrit	Palangmai	Ratchaburi province, Thailand	Decision	5	3:00
2022-11-20	Win	(Thailand) Yodbuangam Luckybanthaeng	Muay Thai Kiatpetch, Rajadamnern Stadium	Bangkok, Thailand	Decision	5	3:00
2022-10-03	Draw	(Thailand) Yodbuangam Luckybanthaeng	Muay Thai Pantamit	Bangkok, Thailand	Decision	5	3:00
For a 2 million baht side-bet.
2022-08-29	Win	(Thailand) Suayai Chor.Hapayak	Muay Thai Pantamit, Thupatemi Stadium	Bangkok, Thailand	Decision	5	3:00
2022-07-18	Win	(Thailand) Petch-Ek Kiatjamroon	Muay Thai Pantamit, Thupatemi Stadium	Bangkok, Thailand	Decision	5	3:00
2022-06-22	Win	(Thailand) Jaroenngern BunlannaMuayThai	Sanpatong Big Fight	Thailand	TKO (Referee stoppage)	4	
2022-05-25	Win	(Thailand) Kiewthong TKD Muay Thai	Muay Thai Palangmai	Bangkok, Thailand	Decision	5	3:00
2021-11-13	Loss	(Thailand) Satanthong Chor.Hapayak	Jao Muay Thai, Omnoi Stadium	Samut Sakhon, Thailand	Decision	5	3:00
For the vacant Omnoi Stadium Light Flyweight (108 lbs) title.
2021-09-25	Win	(Thailand) Satanthong Chor.Hapayak	Jao Muay Thai, Omnoi Stadium	Samut Sakhon, Thailand	Decision	5	3:00
2021-03-17	Win	(Thailand) Kongpathapi Sor.Sor.Anumat	Sor.Thanapon	Thailand	KO	2	
2020-12-15	Win	(Thailand) Wanphetlek Uengubon		Maha Sarakham province, Thailand	KO	2	
2020-03-18	Win	(Thailand) Detchapanu Jayutthakongseub		Thailand	KO	2	
2020-03-	Win	(Thailand) Jaophayafai Singnewinkalasin		Thailand	KO	4	
2020-02-29	Win	(Thailand) Rambo-Jiew Sitthepprathan	Muaymanwansuk	Bangkok, Thailand	TKO	2	
2020-	Win	(Thailand) Thailandlek Paesaisi		Thailand	KO	4	
2019-	Win	(Thailand) Kiew Ror.KilaLampang		Thailand	KO	2	
2019-	Win	(Thailand) Plaingern Sit Sornpichai		Thailand	Decision	5	3:00
2019-08-19	Win	(Thailand) Maemos Lukjaoporkumphakhan		Thailand	KO	3	
Legend: Win Loss Draw/No contest Notes

Amateur Muay Thai Record
Date	Result	Opponent	Event	Location	Method	Round	Time
2023-10-03	Loss	(Ukraine) Mykhailo Serdiuk	2023 IFMA Youth World Championship, Semifinals	Antalya, Turkey	Decision (Unanimous)	3	3:00
Wins 2023 IFMA Youth World Championship U-23 Bronze Medal.
2023-10-02	Win	(Austria) Tekin Keles	2023 IFMA Youth World Championship, Quarterfinals	Antalya, Turkey	Decision (Unanimous)	3	3:00
Legend: Win Loss Draw/No contest Notes
