= Sakaengam Jitmuangnon =

Thai Muay Thai fighter (born 2000)

- Born: Jakkrit Pankaew; July 22, 2000 (age 26); Wang Pong District, Phetchabun Province, Thailand
- Other names: Daralek Sor.Prasertchai
- Nationality: Thai
- Height: 165 cm (5 ft 5 in)
- Weight: 50.5 kg (111 lb; 7.95 st)
- Division: Atomweight (2014-2016) Mini Flyweight (2016-2018) Light Flyweight (2018-2019) Flyweight (2019-present)
- Style: Muay Mat
- Fighting out of: Nonthaburi, Thailand
- Years active: 2010-present

Sakaengam Jitmuangnon (Thai: สะแกงาม จิตรเมืองนนท์) is a Thai Muay Thai fighter. He currently trains and fights out of Jitmuangnon Camp and his natural weight is 55 kg (121 lb; 8.66 st). On the 26 November 2020, Yokkao announced that they had signed Sakaengam, along with two of his teammates: Rodtang Jitmuangnon and Nuenglanlek Jitmuangnon.

== Biography ==
Sakaengam was born into a poor family in Phetchabun Province. He started boxing at 9 years old because he wanted to help his family financially. His first fight came when Sakaengam was only 10 years old at a temple event in Wang Pong District, near where he lived. At the time, he weighed only 32 kg and fought under the name Daralek Sor.Prasertchai. He won the fight by decision and with it, ฿300. Four years later, at only 14 years old, Sakaengam joined the famous Jitmuangnon Camp in Nonthaburi.

Sakaengam faced Suayai Chor.Hapayak in a third time on January 20, 2023, at ONE Friday Fights 1. He won the fight via knockout in the first round.

== Titles and accomplishments ==
- 2016 Channel 7 Stadium Fight of the Year (vs Tai Parunchai)
- 2017 Siam Omnoi Stadium 105 lbs Champion
- 7th annual Maabin Tournament Champion (2020)

== Fight record ==
Muay Thai Record
Date	Result	Opponent	Event	Location	Method	Round	Time
2024-05-17	Loss	(Thailand) Chatpichit SorSor.Toipadriew	ONE Friday Fights 63, Lumpinee Stadium	Bangkok, Thailand	Decision (Unanimous)	3	3:00
2023-09-29	Win	(Thailand) Ploykhao VK.Khao Yai	ONE Friday Fights 35, Lumpinee Stadium	Bangkok, Thailand	TKO (Referee stoppage)	3	0:46
2023-05-28	Loss	(Thailand) Chatpichit SorSor.Toipadriew	ONE Friday Fights 14, Lumpinee Stadium	Bangkok, Thailand	Decision (Unanimous)	3	3:00
2023-03-03	Loss	(Thailand) Petchbanrai Singmawynn	ONE Friday Fights 7, Lumpinee Stadium	Bangkok, Thailand	Decision (Unanimous)	3	3:00
2023-01-20	Win	(Thailand) Suayai Chor.Hapayak	ONE Friday Fights 1, Lumpinee Stadium	Bangkok, Thailand	KO (Right cross)	1	2:45
2022-10-08	Win	(Thailand) Chatpichit SorSor.Toipadriew	9Muaydee VitheeThai, OrTorGor.3 Stadium	Nonthaburi province, Thailand	Decision	5	3:00
Won the vacant Jitmuangnon Stadium Flyweight (112 lbs) title.
2022-09-14	Loss	(Thailand) Chatpichit Sor.Jor.Toipadriew	Suk Jitmuangnon	Kalasin, Thailand	Decision	5	3:00
2022-07-27	Win	(Thailand) Suayai Chor.Hapayak	Muay Thai Chalermprakiat + Suk Yod Muay Mahachon	Nonthaburi province, Thailand	Decision	5	3:00
2022-05-28	Loss	(Thailand) Dejphichai Navi-Andaman	Jitmuangnont Superfight, Nonthaburi Stadium	Nonthaburi, Thailand	Decision	5	3:00
2022-04-02	Loss	(Thailand) Fahlan Por.Phetkaikaew	Lumpinee Stadium	Bangkok, Thailand	Decision	5	3:00
2021-12-25	Win	(Thailand) Sakonpat ChotBangsaen	Omnoi Stadium	Bangkok, Thailand	Decision	5	3:00
2021-10-16	Loss	(Thailand) Banluerit Siwatcharatchai	Siam Omnoi Stadium	Samut Sakhon, Thailand	TKO (referee stoppage)	3	
2021-03-26	Win	(Thailand) Yodkla Por.Wisetgym	True4U Muaymumwansuk, Rangsit Stadium	Rangsit, Thailand	Decision	5	3:00
2021-02-21	Win	(Thailand) Petchsarit PimsiriMuayThaiGym	MuaydeeVitheeThai, Blue Arena	Samut Prakan, Thailand	KO (Elbow)	3	
2020-12-18	Loss	(Thailand) Phetbanrai Singmawin	Suk Singmawin	Songkhla, Thailand	Decision	5	3:00
2020-10-31	Loss	(Thailand) Banluerit Siwatcharatchai	Siam Omnoi Stadium	Bangkok, Thailand	Decision	5	3:00
2020-10-04	Win	(Thailand) Sueyai Chor.Hapayak	Channel 7 Stadium	Bangkok, Thailand	KO (right cross)	2	
2020-08-15	Win	(Thailand) Banluerit Siwatcharatchai	Maabin Tournament Final, Siam Omnoi Stadium	Samut Sakhon, Thailand	Decision	5	3:00
Wins the 7th annual Maabin Tournament and the ฿650,000 Grand Prize
2020-07-11	Win	(Thailand) Chaiyo PetchyindeeAcademy	Maabin Tournament Semi-Final, Siam Omnoi Stadium	Samut Sakhon, Thailand	Decision	5	3:00
2020-02-22	Win	(Thailand) PhetAnuwat Nor.Anuwatgym	Maabin Tournament Quarter-Final, Siam Omnoi Stadium	Samut Sakhon, Thailand	Decision	5	3:00
2020-01-18	Draw	(Thailand) Phetjonkrak Wor.Sangpapai	Siam Omnoi Stadium	Bangkok, Thailand	Decision	5	3:00
2019-11-18	Win	(Thailand) Fahlan Por.Phetkaikaew	Rajadamnern Stadium	Bangkok, Thailand	Decision	5	3:00
2019-10-17	Win	(Thailand) Yodnakrob Por.Boonsit	Rajadamnern Stadium	Bangkok, Thailand	Decision	5	3:00
2019-09-12	Loss	(Thailand) Yodpanum Por.Phetkaikaew	Rajadamnern Stadium	Bangkok, Thailand	KO	3	
2019-08-07	Win	(Thailand) Phetpanlan Phetsimuen	Rajadamnern Stadium	Bangkok, Thailand	Decision	5	3:00
2019-07-13	Win	(Thailand) Phetjonkrak Wor.Sangpapai	Rajadamnern Stadium	Bangkok, Thailand	Decision	5	3:00
2019-05-03	Win	(Thailand) Phetnakon Tor.Phettawan	Siam Omnoi Stadium	Samut Sakhon, Thailand	Decision	5	3:00
2019-04-07	Win	(Thailand) Yodnakrob Por.Boonsit	Muay Dee Withithai, Blue Arena	Samut Prakan, Thailand	Decision	5	3:00
2019-03-07	Loss	(Thailand) Suntos Sor.Saranpat	Rajadamnern Stadium	Bangkok, Thailand	Decision	5	3:00
2019-01-31	Loss	(Thailand) Suntos Sor.Saranpat	Rajadamnern Stadium	Bangkok, Thailand	Decision	5	3:00
2018-10-31	Loss	(Thailand) Hercules Phetsimean	Rajadamnern Stadium	Bangkok, Thailand	Decision	5	3:00
2018-09-29	Loss	(Thailand) Hongtae Rinmuaythai	Siam Omnoi Stadium	Samut Sakhon, Thailand	Decision	5	3:00
2018-08-30	Loss	(Thailand) Yodphet Ennymuaythai	Lumpinee Stadium	Bangkok, Thailand	Decision	5	3:00
2018-06-30	Win	(Thailand) Suntos Sor.Saranpat	Siam Omnoi Stadium	Samut Sakhon, Thailand	Decision	5	3:00
Defends the Siam Omnoi Stadium 105 lbs title
2018-05-23	Win	(Thailand) Wanmawin Pumpanmuang	Rajadamnern Stadium	Bangkok, Thailand	Decision	5	3:00
2018-04-19	Win	(Thailand) Aikyala Yuikanchang	Rajadamnern Stadium	Bangkok, Thailand	Decision	5	3:00
2018-03-17	Loss	(Thailand) Chaiyo PetchyindeeAcademy	Rajadamnern Stadium	Bangkok, Thailand	Decision	5	3:00
2018-02-08	Win	(Thailand) Waewwao Wor.Wangpom	Rajadamnern Stadium	Bangkok, Thailand	Decision	5	3:00
2017-11-29	Loss	(Thailand) Tayat Aor.Pasert	Rajadamnern Stadium	Bangkok, Thailand	Decision	5	3:00
2017-11-01	Loss	(Thailand) Kaipa 13Coinresort	Rajadamnern Stadium	Bangkok, Thailand	Decision	5	3:00
2017-08-09	Loss	(Thailand) Mohawk Petsimuen	Siam Omnoi Stadium	Bangkok, Thailand	Decision	5	3:00
2017-08-05	Win	(Thailand) Suntos Sor.Saranpat	Siam Omnoi Stadium	Samut Sakhon, Thailand	KO	4	
Wins Siam Omnoi Stadium 105 lbs title
2017-07-07	Win	(Thailand) Kongtoranee Ror.Kilalampang	Lumpinee Stadium	Bangkok, Thailand	Decision	5	3:00
2017-06-10	Win	(Thailand) Aikyala Yuikanchang	Siam Omnoi Stadium	Samut Sakhon, Thailand	KO	4	
2017-04-01	Win	(Thailand) Offside Huarongnakhaeng	Nakhon Ratchasima	Nakhon Ratchasima, Thailand	Decision	5	3:00
2017-03-15	Loss	(Thailand) Tapaokaew Singmawynn	Rajadamnern Stadium	Bangkok, Thailand	Decision	5	3:00
2017-02-07	Loss	(Thailand) Klapajon Lukbanyai	Lumpinee Stadium	Bangkok, Thailand	Decision	5	3:00
2016-12-25	Win	(Thailand) Tai Parunchai	Channel 7 Stadium	Bangkok, Thailand	Decision	5	3:00
2016-10-10	Win	(Thailand) Lanyakaew Kiatyothin		Thailand	Decision	5	3:00
2016-07-08	Loss	(Thailand) Sian Parunchai	Lumpinee Stadium	Bangkok, Thailand	Decision	5	3:00
2016-06-05	Win	(Thailand) Tai Parunchai	Channel 7 Stadium	Rangsit, Thailand	Decision	5	3:00
2016-05-15	Win	(Thailand) Lanyakaew Kiatyothin	Rangsit Stadium	Rangsit, Thailand	Decision	5	3:00
2016-04-22	Win	(Thailand) Ninmunkkon Or.Sabaitae	Lumpinee Stadium	Bangkok, Thailand	Decision	5	3:00
2016-03-28	Loss	(Thailand) Tai Parunchai	Nakhon Si Thammarat	Thung Song, Thailand	Decision	5	3:00
2016-02-05	Win	(Thailand) Tai Parunchai	Lumpinee Stadium	Bangkok, Thailand	Decision	5	3:00
2015-11-15	Loss	(Thailand) Phetarer Sedakobwatsaduphan	Channel 7 Stadium	Bangkok, Thailand	KO	4	
2015-09-25	Win	(Thailand) Kengklan Numpomthep	Lumpinee Stadium	Bangkok, Thailand	Decision	5	3:00
2015-09-04	Win	(Thailand) Wankert Sipsonong	Lumpinee Stadium	Bangkok, Thailand	Decision	5	3:00
2015-08-07	Win	(Thailand) Wankert Sipsonong	Lumpinee Stadium	Bangkok, Thailand	Decision	5	3:00
2015-01-18	Loss	(Thailand) Kaduaklek Kor.Komkiew	Channel 7 Stadium	Bangkok, Thailand	Decision	5	3:00
Legend: Win Loss Draw/No contest Notes
