= ONE Friday Fights 7 =

Combat sport events in 2023

ONE Friday Fights 7: Rambolek vs. Theeradet
- Promotion: ONE Championship
- Date: March 3, 2023
- Venue: Lumpinee Boxing Stadium
- City: Bangkok, Thailand

Event chronology
ONE Fight Night 7: Lineker vs. Andrade	ONE Friday Fights 7: Rambolek vs. Theeradet	ONE Friday Fights 8: Petsukumvit vs. Petchmuangsri

ONE Friday Fights 7: Rambolek vs. Theeradet (also known as ONE Lumpinee 7) was a combat sport event produced by ONE Championship that took place on March 3, 2023, at Lumpinee Boxing Stadium in Bangkok, Thailand.

== Background ==
In the event was headlined at preliminary card by a bantamweight muay thai bout between the Yodphupha Tor.Yotha vs. Ilyas Musaev, at the main event in a 143 pounds catchweight muay thai bout between Rambolek Chor.Ajalaboon vs. Theeradet Chor.Hapayak.

== Results ==
Main card (YouTube / Facebook)
Weight class				Method	Round	Time	Notes
Catchweight (143 lbs) Muay Thai	Rambolek Chor.Ajalaboon	def.	Theeradet Chor.Hapayak	KO (punch)	2	0:10
Strawweight Muay Thai	Kongchai Chanaidonmuang	def.	Chalamkhao P.K.Saenchai	Decision (unanimous)	3	3:00
Catchweight (118 lbs) Muay Thai	Ritnaka OrBorJor. NakhonPhanom	def.	Rittidet Kiatsongrit	Decision (split)	3	3:00
Catchweight (113 lbs) Muay Thai	Petchbanrai Singha Mawynn	def.	Sakaengam Jitmuangnon	Decision (unanimous)	3	3:00
Women's Strawweight Muay Thai	Yuly Alves	def.	Kwanjai Sor.Tawanrung	Decision (split)	3	3:00
Catchweight (132 lbs) Muay Thai	Samingdam Chor.Ajalaboon	def.	Rittidet Sor.Sommai	KO (punches)	2	0:25
Preliminary card (FanDuel TV)
Bantamweight Muay Thai	Yodphupha Tor.Yotha	def.	Ilyas Musaev	Decision (unanimous)	3	3:00
Heavyweight	Lawrence Philips	def.	Ben Parker	KO (slam)	1	0:18
Middleweight	Arash Mardani	def.	Mamurjon Khamidov	Decision (unanimous)	3	5:00
Catchweight (110 lbs) Muay Thai	Lisa Brierley	def.	Rungnapa Por.Muangphet	KO (punch)	1	1:09
Women's Atomweight	So Yul Kim	def.	Souris Manfredi	Technical Submission (guillotine choke)	1	4:12
Flyweight Muay Thai	Samingdam Looksuan	def.	Shakhriyor Jurayev	Decision (unanimous)	3	3:00

== Bonus awards ==
The following fighters received $10,000 bonuses.

- Performance of the Night: Rambolek Chor.Ajalaboon, Samingdam Chor.Ajalaboon and Lisa Brierley

== See also ==
- 2023 in ONE Championship
- List of ONE Championship events
- List of current ONE fighters
