= Rajadamnern Stadium rankings =

Ranking system of Rajadamnern Stadium

Rajadamnern Stadium rankings, which were founded in 1955, are the formalized system of divisional rankings that are produced by the Ranking Committee subdivision of Rajadamnern Stadium. Rankings are updated monthly by the specialized committee.

The system has 16 weight divisions represented by 15 fighters per rank, with the rules being that fighters within the top 10 range has the eligibility to challenge for an interim or undisputed title, with fighters out that specified range having to defeat one of the fighters in it, to become eligible themselves.

Quality of opponents and wins, recent form and consistency, a win-loss record, title defenses or achievements, and specialized performances are favored in the rankings for non-champions, while title holders of a division have a 3 to 4 month window to defend their title, and if they don't defend in that window without a specific medical reason or misses weight, they are stripped of the title and a vacancy is introduced, where the top contenders of the division are paired up for a vacant title match.

If the champion suffers a long-term injury, the most available competitiors will be sanctioned for an interim title bout. If a challenging fighter misses weight, they are no longer eligible to win the title they were sanctioned for, whether it is a interim or undisputed title bout, and the bout can either become a catch weight bout or a super fight, and they are fined a percentage of their purse.

== History ==
Rajadamnern Stadium opened operations for Muay Thai competition on December 23, 1945, where the first competitions of the sport were surrounded by independent promoters. Specific competitions that were synonymous to the best fighter of their divisions were recognized by a samat, a traditional sport jacket that was awarded to champions of the stadium.

In 1955, the stadium compiled the first rulebook of a major Muay Thai-based stadium, a divisional ranking system, and a range of weight classes that were inspired by the weight classes of Western boxing in Thailand during the time, along with the inclusion of minimum boxing bouts happening per card in the stadium's inauguration, and Muay Thai bouts happening in boxing rings.

In 1984, the stadium's ranking committee released a ranking list that identified the top ten greatest Muay Thai practitioners of all time in the middle of the sport's Golden Era, which was a time period between the early 1980's to the mid 1990's that saw a major boost in popularity of the sport across the world, the development of multiple legends sport-wide, and a raise in competition for local stadiums and payouts per fight.

In the year of 2022, the stadium and their rankings saw a massive overhaul of representation of their roster and new divisions, as the first women's fights of the stadium commenced and women's divisions were created, with a supportive ranking system to back up the competition being released a year later. This move by Rajadamnern raised the popularity of Women's Muay Thai, as multiple communities applauded the inclusion and public interest support of a major female roster, after multiple decades of promoters banning women's competitions and having minimal coverage for the gendered aspect.

In the same year, the Bangkok-based sports entertainment company and firm Global Sport Ventures Co., Ltd (GSV), a subsidiary of Plan B Media Co., Ltd., publlicly announced an investment with Rajadamnern Stadium Co., Ltd., and vowed to modernize and revamp the stadium's media, content, advertising, and the overall framework for the company. In later months, GSV launched a weekly program of the stadium's media, Rajadamnern World Series (RWS), which is a formalized show that featured a updated rule set of the stadium, led to better production values, the first of a open-score format for Muay Thai, and the inclusion of the stadium's previously publish-based rankings to form into a publicly viewable ranking system on the internet.

Today, Rajadamnern Stadium holds the rankings for 16 viable divisions that stretches from Minimumweight (105 lbs), to Middleweight (160 lbs), with 13 male divisions and 3 women's divisions currently being represented.

== Legend ==
Legend
▲ +1	Move up
Steady	No change
▼ −1	Move down
New entry	Not previously ranked

== Men's divisions ==
=== Middleweight ===
Upper limit: 160 lbs / 72.58 kg

Rank	ISO	Fighter	Record	M	Win streak	Last fight					Next fight			
Rank	ISO	Fighter	Record	M	Win streak	Result	Event	Opponent	Date	Ref.	Event	Opponent	Date	Ref.
C	(Thailand)	Petchmorakot Bangmadklongtan	176-39-2	Steady	1 (4 def)	Win	RWS 191	Salimkhan Ibragimov	April 25, 2026		TBD			
IC	(Thailand)	Thananchai Sitsongpeenong	86-23-1	Steady	6 (1 def)	Win	RWS 173	Emerson Bento	December 20, 2025		TBD			
1	(Russia)	Dmitry Changelia	9-4	Steady	2	Win	RWS 190	Nuasingha Sitpooyaniniran	April 18, 2026		TBD			
2	(Brazil)	Emerson Bento	55-10	Steady	0	Loss	RWS 200	Dmitry Menshikov	June 27, 2026		TBD			
3	(Thailand)	Kongjak Por. Pao-in	123-22-10	Steady	1	Win	Fight Clubbing 42	Domenico Caravello	May 2, 2026		TBD			
4	(Azerbaijan)	Ruslan Naghiyev	25-15-3	Steady	0	Loss	Thai Fight: Kard Chuek	Nong-O Hama	December 21, 2025		TBD			
5	(Russia)	Salimkhan Ibragimov	33-8-1	Steady	0	Loss	RWS 191	Petchmorakot Bangmadklongtan	April 25, 2026		TBD			
6	(Thailand)	Yodsaenchai Nayok-A-Thasala	66-15	Steady	9	Win	RWS 188	Dan Butler	April 4, 2026		TBD			
7	(Australia)	Benjamin Porter	10-4	Steady	2	Win	Rajadamnern Knockout	Tapaothong Singha Mawynn	May 18, 2026		TBD			
8	(Spain) (Democratic Republic of the Congo)	Nayanesh Ayman	71-23	Steady	0	Loss	Fight Clubbing 40	Domenico Caravello	December 20, 2025		TBD			
9	(Thailand)	Nuasingha Sitpooyaniniran	39-13-1	Steady	0	Loss	RWS 190	Dmitry Changelia	April 18, 2026		TBD			
10	(Scotland) (England)	Lee Mackay	6-2	Steady	2	Win	MTGP Fight Night - Glasgow	Samir Bouamrane	July 4, 2026		War Fight Series 5	Joe Dean	September 5, 2026	
11	(Thailand)	Tapaothong Singha Mawynn	44-13	Steady	0	Loss	Rajadamern Knockout	Benjamin Porter	May 18, 2026		TBD			
12	(Thailand)	Denkaosaen Sor. Noppadet	48-15-1	Steady	6	Win	Kiatpetch TKO	Samie Bastakabad	May 17, 2026		TBD			
13	(Thailand)	Petchroiet Petchsomnuk	45-12-1	Steady	4	Win	Kiatpetch TKO	Mohammad Barghi	May 17, 2026		TBD			
14	(Republic of Ireland)	Liam McDonnell	6-6	Steady	2	Win	Deliverance Muay Thai	Mohamad Kaif	May 2, 2026		TBD			
15	(Australia)	David Pennimpede	34-13-4	Steady	0	Draw	RWS 199	Denpanom Pran26	June 20, 2026		TBD			

=== Super Welterweight ===
Upper limit: 154 lbs / 69.85 kg

Rank	ISO	Fighter	Record	M	Win streak	Last fight					Next fight			
Rank	ISO	Fighter	Record	M	Win streak	Result	Event	Opponent	Date	Ref.	Event	Opponent	Date	Ref.
C	(Switzerland) (Dominican Republic)	Daniel Rodriguez	50-1	Steady	10 (5 def)	Win	RWS 200	Angel Bauza	June 27, 2026		TBD			
1	(Thailand)	Rittewada Petchyindee Academy	81-22-5	Steady	5	Win	RWS 174	Aleksei Ulianov	December 27, 2025		TBD			
2	(Thailand)	Pheuthai Siriluck MuayThai	58-11-2	Steady	1	Win	RWS 178	Mohammadarman Mohammadpour	January 24, 2026		RWS 202	Hamza Sabri	July 11, 2026	
3	(Thailand)	Boonlert Sor. Boonmeerit	63-10	Steady	3	Win	RWS 187	Jovan Gardasevic	March 28, 2026		TBD			
4	(Thailand)	Rambo Pet.Por.Tor.Or	73-26-2	▲ +9	2	Win	LWC Super Champ 88	Oussama Taoud	May 24, 2025		TBD			
5	(Thailand)	Sansiri Mor. Rattanabundit	61-21-2	▲ +9	0	Loss	LWC Super Champ 87	Cleiton de Faria	May 3, 2025		TBD			
6	(Argentina)	Angel Bauza	25-8	▼ −2	0	Loss	RWS 200	Daniel Rodriguez	June 27, 2026		TBD			
7	(Australia)	Daniel Matthews	14-1	▼ −2	7	Win	RWS 191	Gennaro de Meo	April 25, 2026		TBD			
8	(Thailand)	Hercules Phetsimean	63-23	▼ −2	0	Loss	RWS 190	Daniel Rodriguez	April 18, 2026		TBD			
9	(Turkey)	Burak Poyraz	31-6	▼ −2	4	Win	RWS 170	Angel Bauza	November 29, 2025		TBD			
10	(Thailand)	Thanupetch Wor. Technoluangpoosuang	8-0	▲ +5	8	Win	Kietpetch TKO	Knoah Solomon	June 7, 2026		TBD			
11	(Brazil)	Luis Cajaiba	65-16	▲ +5	1	Win	Amazing MuayThai World Festival 2026	Sitthichai Sitsongpeenong	June 30, 2026		TBD			
12	(United States)	Knoah Solomon	24-8	▼ −4	0	Loss	RWS 201	Andreas Čehovský	July 4, 2026		TBD			
13	(Republic of Ireland)	Garrett Smylie	26-5-1	▼ −4	0	Loss	RWS 193	Angel Bauza	May 9, 2026		Yokkao 52	Joe Craven	September 12, 2026	
14	(Morocco)	Ahmed el-Hamdouni	15-6-1	▼ −3	2	Win	RWS 194	Levi Bailey	May 16, 2026		TBD			
15	(Morocco)	Hamza Sabri	11-3	▲ +1	1	Win	RWS 171	Nikita Gerasimovich	December 6, 2025		RWS 202	Pheuthai Siriluck MuayThai	July 11, 2026	

=== Welterweight ===
Upper limit: 147 lbs / 66.68 kg

Rank	ISO	Fighter	Record	M	Win streak	Last fight					Next fight			
Rank	ISO	Fighter	Record	M	Win streak	Result	Event	Opponent	Date	Ref.	Event	Opponent	Date	Ref.
C	(Thailand)	Tapaokaew Singha Mawynn	81-22-2	Steady	4 (3 def)	Win	RWS 184	Saenpon Por. Sommai	March 7, 2026		RWS 202	Niall McGreevy	July 11, 2026	
1	(Russia)	Kirill Khomutov	15-5	Steady	3	Win	RWS 196	Nuenglanlek Jitmuangnon	May 30, 2026		RWS 202	Erdem Dincer	July 11, 2026	
2	(Thailand)	Petchthongchai Sor. Sommai	83-24-2	Steady	10	Win	RWS 191	Leonid Kostin	April 2, 2026		RWS 204	Sajad Sattari	July 25, 2026	
3	(Thailand)	Saenpon Sor. Sommai	63-29	▲ +4	0	Loss	RWS 184	Tapaokaew Singha Mawynn	March 7, 2026		TBD			
4	(Thailand)	Pentor Paeminburi	8-0-1	▲ +9	5	Win	Kiatpetch TKO	Pornpitak Sor. Jor. Tongprachin	June 7, 2026		Kiatpetch TKO	Alessandro Sara	July 12, 2026	
5	(Republic of Ireland)	Niall McGreevy	20-3	▼ −1	6	Win	RWS 195	Chujaroen Dabransarakarm	May 23, 2026		RWS 202	Tapaokaew Singha Mawynn	July 11, 2026	
6	(France)	Alexis Laugeois	38-15-1	▲ +10	1	Win	RWS 198	Khunhanlek Singha Mawynn	June 13, 2026		TBD			
7	(Thailand)	Kongkula Jitmuangnon	56-18	▲ +7	0	Loss	Kiatpetch TKO	Pentor Paeminburi	April 26, 2026		TBD			
8	(Thailand)	Khunhanlek Singha Mawynn	56-18-2	▼ −5	0	Loss	RWS 198	Alexis Laugeois	June 13, 2026		TBD			
9	(Italy)	Paolo D'Antoni	11-7	▼ −4	2	Win	RWS 190	Peemai Por. Kobkuea	April 18, 2026		TBD			
10	(Thailand)	Pornpitak Sor. Jor. Tongprachin	54-28-5	▼ −4	0	Loss	Kietpetch TKO	Pentor Paeminburi	June 7, 2026		TBD			
11	(Italy)	Alessandro Sara	53-19-4	▼ −3	0	Loss	RWS 186	Kirill Khomutov	March 21, 2026		Kiatpetch TKO	Pentor Paeminburi	July 12, 2026	
12	(Portugal)	Rafael Augusto	11-2-1	▲ +4	3	Win	New Power	Kaolan Sitkamnanneng	June 3, 2026		TBD			
13	(Uganda)	Award Kazimba	54-15	▲ +3	2	Win	RWS 200	Gonzalo Albinagorta	June 27, 2026		TBD			
14	(Thailand)	Nuenglanlek Jitmuangnon	84-28-5	▼ −4	0	Loss	RWS 196	Kirill Khomutev	May 30, 2026		TBD			
15	(Thailand)	Moradokpetch Petchyindee Academy	63-14-2	▼ −4	0	Loss	RWS 185	Flukenoi Kiatfahlikit	March 14, 2026		Petchyindee Boxing Fights	Petchsongpak Sitjaroensab	July 26, 2026	

== See also ==
- Rajadamnern Stadium
- List of Muay Thai practitioners
- Lumpinee Stadium
- World Muaythai Council
- International Federation of Muaythai Associations
- Muay Thai
- Tiger Cub Economies
- Economy of Thailand
