= Dam Parunchai =

Thai Muay Thai fighter

- Born: 2001 (age 24–25); Phatthalung province, Thailand
- Other names: Seuadam Sor.Kongmee; Wanchana Sor.Usa
- Height: 181 cm (5 ft 11 in)
- Division: Super Lightweight
- Reach: 183 cm (72 in)
- Style: Muay Thai (Muay Femur)
- Stance: Southpaw
- Fighting out of: Thung Song, Nakhon Si Thammarat, Thailand
- Team: Parunchai Gym
- Trainer: Oley Kiatoneway; Jaroenthong Kiatbanchong; Sagat Petchyindee

Kickboxing record
- Total: 99
- Wins: 90
- Losses: 9
- Draws: 0

Dam Parunchai (Thai: ดามพ์ พรัญชัย) is a Thai Muay Thai fighter. He is the current Rajadamnern Stadium Super Lightweight Champion and former Channel 7 Stadium Super Lightweight Champion.

As of October 2024, he is ranked #1 and #2 at Super Lightweight by the WMO and Combat Press respectively.

== Muay Thai career ==
Dam trains at the historic Parunchai Gym in Nakhon Si Thammarat under former top fighter Oley Kiatoneway and alongside champions such as Chalam, Kiew, Jom, and Pon Parunchai.

On December 12, 2023, Dam faced Flukenoi Kiatfahlikit for the vacant Channel 7 Stadium 140 lbs title. He won the fight by technical knockout in the fourth round.

== Titles and accomplishments ==
- Rajadamnern Stadium
  - 2024 Rajadamnern Stadium Super Lightweight (140 lbs) Champion
    - Five successful title defenses
- Channel 7 Stadium
  - 2023 Channel 7 Stadium Super Lightweight (140 lbs) Champion

== Fight record ==
Professional Muay Thai record
90 Wins, 9 Losses, 0 Draw
Date	Result	Opponent	Event	Location	Method	Round	Time
2026-08-08	Win	(Thailand) Capitan Petchyindee Academy	Rajadamnern World Series, Rajadamnern Stadium	Bangkok, Thailand	Decision (Unanimous)	5	3:00
Defends the Rajadamnern Stadium Super Lightweight (140 lbs) title.
2026-04-18	Win	(Australia) Chadd Collins	Rajadamnern World Series, Rajadamnern Stadium	Bangkok, Thailand	Decision (Unanimous)	5	3:00
Defends the Rajadamnern Stadium Super Lightweight (140 lbs) title.
2026-02-14	Win	(Thailand) Rangkhao Wor.Sangprapai	Rajadamnern World Series, Rajadamnern Stadium	Bangkok, Thailand	Decision (Unanimous)	5	3:00
Defends the Rajadamnern Stadium Super Lightweight (140 lbs) title.
2025-09-06	Win	(Thailand) Flukenoi Kiatfahlikit	Rajadamnern World Series, Rajadamnern Stadium	Bangkok, Thailand	Decision (Majority)	5	3:00
Defends the Rajadamnern Stadium Super Lightweight (140 lbs) title.
2025-03-15	Win	(Thailand) Phetphuthai Sitsarawatseua	Rajadamnern World Series, Rajadamnern Stadium	Bangkok, Thailand	KO (Elbow)	3	
Defends the Rajadamnern Stadium Super Lightweight (140 lbs) title.
2024-12-07	Loss	(Thailand) Petchthongchai Sor.Sommai	Rajadamnern World Series - Final Rajadamnern Stadium	Bangkok, Thailand	Decision (Unanimous)	5	3:00
For the 2024 Rajadamnern World Series Super Lightweight (140 lbs) title.
2024-10-26	Win	(Thailand) Khunhanlek Singhamawynn	Rajadamnern World Series - Final 4, Rajadamnern Stadium	Bangkok, Thailand	Decision (Unanimous)	3	3:00
2024-09-14	Win	(England) Alfie Pearse	Rajadamnern World Series - Group Stage, Rajadamnern Stadium	Bangkok, Thailand	Decision (Unanimous)	3	3:00
2024-08-10	Win	(Australia) Jaga Chan	Rajadamnern World Series - Group Stage, Rajadamnern Stadium	Bangkok, Thailand	Decision (Unanimous)	3	3:00
2024-06-39	Win	(Thailand) Petchaimet Sor.Jor.Tongprachin	Rajadamnern World Series, Rajadamnern Stadium	Bangkok, Thailand	KO (Head Kick)	3	2:46
2024-04-27	Win	(Thailand) Petchthongchai Sor.Sommai	Suk RuangchaijaoSurat	Surat Thani, Thailand	Decision	5	3:00
2024-03-02	Win	(Thailand) Petchthongchai Sor.Sommai	Rajadamnern World Series, Rajadamnern Stadium	Bangkok, Thailand	Decision (Unanimous)	5	3:00
Wins the Rajadamnern Stadium Super Lightweight (140 lbs) title.
2023-12-10	Win	(Thailand) Flukenoi Kiatfahlikit	Suk Muay Thai 7 Si, Channel 7 Stadium	Bangkok, Thailand	TKO (retirement)	4	
Wins the vacant Channel 7 Stadium Super Lightweight (140 lbs) title.
2023-07-05	Win	(Thailand) Moradokpet Muayded789	Satun Super Fight	Satun, Thailand	Decision	5	3:00
2023-05-13	Win	(Thailand) Runsaengtawan Sor.Parat	Suk Muay Thai 7 Si, Channel 7 Stadium	Bangkok, Thailand	TKO	3	
2023-03-11	Win	(Thailand) Worapon Kiatchatchanan	Suk RuangkhonkhonSamui	Surat Thani, Thailand	Decision	5	3:00
2022-12-27	Win	(Thailand) ET Tded99	Suk Lumpinee Pitakham, Lumpinee Stadium	Bangkok, Thailand	Decision	5	3:00
2022-10-26	Loss	(Thailand) Yodduangchai Sor.Jor.Montree	Suk Palangmai, Rajadamnern Stadium	Bangkok, Thailand	Decision	5	3:00
2022-09-07	Win	(Thailand) Nampongnoi Sor.Sommai	Suk Palangmai, Rajadamnern Stadium	Bangkok, Thailand	KO	4	
2022-07-27	Loss	(Thailand) Otop Or.Kwanmuang	Suk Palangmai, Rajadamnern Stadium	Bangkok, Thailand	TKO	3	
2022-06-25	Loss	(Thailand) Samoinoi Daengkhaosai	Suk Jaomuaythai, Siam Omnoi Stadium	Samut Sakhon, Thailand	Decision	5	3:00
2022-05-14	Win	(Thailand) Chatmongkol Chor.Hapayak	Suk Jaomuaythai, Siam Omnoi Stadium	Samut Sakhon, Thailand	Decision	5	3:00
2022-03-19	Win	(Thailand) Petchpradab Mumtalaymuaythai	Suk Jaomuaythai, Siam Omnoi Stadium	Samut Sakhon, Thailand	Decision	5	3:00
2020-11-19	Win	(Thailand) Hacker Wor.Jakkrawut	Suk Petchwitthaya, Rajadamnern Stadium	Bangkok, Thailand	Decision	5	3:00
2020-11-12	Loss	(Thailand) Ratchasak Tded99	Suk Palangmai, Rajadamnern Stadium	Bangkok, Thailand	Decision	5	3:00
2020-03-15	Win	(Thailand) Petchdetpong Nengsabyai	Suk Jaomuaythai, Siam Omnoi Stadium	Samut Sakhon, Thailand	Decision	5	3:00
2019-12-09	Loss	(Thailand) Muangsap Kiatsongrit	Suk Petchwitthaya, Rajadamnern Stadium	Bangkok, Thailand	KO	4	
2019-09-21	Win	(Thailand) Ponpayak Sor.Pumipat	Suk OneSongchai, Thanakorn Stadium	Nakhon Pathom, Thailand	KO	3	
2019-06-24	Loss	(Thailand) Petchpruhat Sitnayoktaweeptapong	Suk OneSongchai, Thanakorn Stadium	Nakhon Pathom, Thailand	TKO	4	
2019-05-15	Loss	(Thailand) Tongsad Or.Nokkaewmuaythai	Suk Petchwitthaya, Rajadamnern Stadium	Bangkok, Thailand	KO	3	
2019-04-11	Won	(Thailand) Hahanek Tor.Laksong	Suk OneSongchai, Rajadamnern Stadium	Bangkok, Thailand	KO	4	
2019-02-20	Loss	(Thailand) Joker Paesaisi	Suk Petchwitthaya, Rajadamnern Stadium	Bangkok, Thailand	Decision	5	3:00
2018-09-05	Win	(Thailand) Nuclear Kiatsongrit	Suk Petchwitthaya, Rajadamnern Stadium	Bangkok, Thailand	Decision	5	3:00
2018-01-11	Win	(Thailand) Joker Paesaisi	Suk Petchwitthaya, Rajadamnern Stadium	Bangkok, Thailand	Decision	5	3:00
Legend: Win Loss Draw/No contest Notes

== See also ==
- Rajadamnern Stadium
