= Batman Or.Atchariya =

Muay Thai fighter

Batman
- Born: Thanachon Suksai; April 21, 1995 (age 31); Ubon Ratchathani Province, Thailand
- Other names: Nuathoranee Phetkiatpetch (เหนือธรณี สามชัยวิเศษสุ)
- Height: 172 cm (5 ft 8 in)
- Weight: 61 kg (134 lb; 9.6 st)
- Style: Muay Thai
- Stance: Orthodox
- Fighting out of: Bangkok, Thailand
- Team: Kiatpetch Gym

Other information
- University: Ubon Ratchathani Rajabhat University

Batman Or.Atchariya (แบ็ทแมน อ.อัจฉริยะ), formerly known as Nuathoranee Samchaivisetsuk (เหนือธรณี สามชัยวิเศษสุก) is a Thai Muay Thai fighter.

== Biography ==
Thanachon Suksai grew up in the Si Muang Mai district, Ubon Ratchathani Province where he started Muay Thai at the age of 9 with his uncle and his older brother at a local boxing camp in his hometown. He was fighting under the name Beerthai Sit.Jaboon before changing to Rakhangphet. After graduating from high school, he used the name Nuathoranee Samchaivisetsuk for his debut at Lumpinee Stadium.

When Nuathoranee was still fighting in Ubon Ratchathani he started to enter the ring wearing a Batman mask with his cornerman dressed as Spiderman. The idea was to attract the youth of the area to his camp and make a name among boxing fans. Nuathoranee still uses the mask for his entrances in Bangkok stadiums earning him the nickname "Batman".

On November 30, 2019 Nuathoranee rematched Sakachainoi M.U.Den who previously beat him. Nuathoranee dominated the fight to a unanimous decision win, capturing the vacant Lumpinee Stadium lightweight title in the process.

Batman went undefeated throughout 2020 and was part of the 5 fighters shortlisted for the Thailand Sports Authority Fighter of the Year award.

On March 7, 2021 Batman defeated Thanonchai Fairtex by unanimous decision at the Channel 7 Stadium for the vacant lightweight title.

== Titles and accomplishments ==
- Lumpinee Stadium
  - 2019 Lumpinee Stadium Lightweight (135 lbs) Champion
- Channel 7 Stadium
  - 2020 Channel 7 Stadium Fighter of the Year
  - 2021 Channel 7 Stadium 135 lbs Champion

== Fight record ==
Muay Thai record
62 Wins (27 (T)KOs), 29 Losses, 5 Draws
Date	Result	Opponent	Event	Location	Method	Round	Time
2024-11-02	Loss	(Australia) Damon Nelson	Empire Fight Series	Perth, Australia	TKO	5	2:59
2023-11-05	Loss	(Japan) Kyohei Furumura	KNOCK OUT 2023 vol.5	Tokyo, Japan	Decision (Unanimous)	3	3:00
2023-09-29	Win	(Thailand) Rungsangtawan Sor Parrat	ONE Friday Fights 35, Lumpinee Stadium	Bangkok, Thailand	KO (Uppercut)	1	1:32
2023-08-06	Win	(Japan) Yota Shigemori	KNOCK OUT 2023 vol.3	Tokyo, Japan	Decision (Unanimous)	3	3:00
2023-04-21	Loss	(Thailand) Paidaeng Kiatsongrit	ONE Friday Fights 13, Lumpinee Stadium	Bangkok, Thailand	Decision (Unanimous)	3	3:00
2023-05-25	Win	(Thailand) PetchThongLor JoeNuvo	Ruamponkon Samui: Samui Super Fight, Petchbuncha Stadium	Koh Samui, Thailand	Decision	5	3:00
2023-02-10	Loss	(Thailand) Duangsompong Jitmuangnon	ONE Friday Fights 4, Lumpinee Stadium	Bangkok, Thailand	Decision (majority)	3	3:00
2022-12-17	Loss	(Thailand) Kongsuk Suanluangrotyok	Samui Super Fight: Ruamponkon Samui, Phetchbuncha Stadium	Koh Samui, Thailand	Decision	5	3:00
2022-11-06	Loss	(Thailand) Kongsuk Suanluangrotyok	Kiatpetch, Channel 7 Stadium	Bangkok, Thailand	Decision	5	3:00
Loses the Channel 7 Stadium 135 lbs title.
2022-09-17	Win	(Thailand) Thanonchai Fairtex	Ruamponkon Samui + Kiatpetch Samui Fight, Petchbuncha Stadium	Koh Samui, Thailand	TKO (Doctor stoppage)	4	
2022-08-22	Win	(Thailand) Rungsaengtawan Sor.Parat	Ruamponkon Samui + Kiatpetch Samui Fight, Petchbuncha Stadium	Koh Samui, Thailand	Decision	5	3:00
2022-05-07	Win	(Thailand) Nakrob Fairtex	Fairtex Fight, Lumpinee Stadium	Bangkok, Thailand	KO (High kick)	1	0:28
2022-03-27	Win	(Thailand) Nakrob Fairtex	Kiatpetch, Channel 7 Stadium	Bangkok, Thailand	Decision (Split)	5	3:00
Defends the Channel 7 Stadium 135 lbs title.
2022-01-02	Win	(Thailand) Nakrob Fairtex	Kiatpetch, Channel 7 Stadium	Bangkok, Thailand	Decision (Unanimous)	5	3:00
Defends the Channel 7 Stadium 135 lbs title.
2021-11-26	Loss	(Thailand) Petchdam Petchyindee Academy	Muay Thai Moradok Kon Thai + Rajadamnern Super Fight	Buriram Province, Thailand	Decision	5	3:00
2021-10-31	Win	(Thailand) Mongkolkaew Sor.Sommai	Channel 7 Stadium	Bangkok, Thailand	Decision	5	3:00
2021-03-07	Win	(Thailand) Thanonchai Fairtex	Kiatpetch, Channel 7 Stadium	Bangkok, Thailand	Decision (Unanimous)	5	3:00
Wins the vacant Channel 7 Stadium 135lbs title.
2020-12-06	Win	(Thailand) Songkom Bangkokalaiyon	Channel 7 Stadium	Bangkok, Thailand	Decision	5	3:00
2020-10-18	Win	(Thailand) Rungsaengtawan Sor.Parat	Channel 7 Stadium	Bangkok, Thailand	Decision	5	3:00
2020-09-13	Win	(Thailand) Sibsaen Tor.JaroenthongPhuket	Channel 7 Stadium	Bangkok, Thailand	Decision	5	3:00
2020-07-19	Win	(Thailand) Songkom Bangkokalaiyon	Or.Tor.Gor.3 Stadium	Nonthaburi Province, Thailand	Decision	5	3:00
2020-02-09	Win	(Thailand) Rungsaengtawan Sor.Parat	Channel 7 Stadium	Bangkok, Thailand	Decision	5	3:00
2019-11-30	Win	(Thailand) Sakchainoi M.U.Den	Lumpinee Stadium	Bangkok, Thailand	Decision (Unanimous)	5	3:00
Wins the vacant Lumpinee Stadium Lightweight (135 lbs) title.
2019-10-26	Win	(Thailand) Jomhod Chor.Ketweena	Lumpinee Stadium	Bangkok, Thailand	KO (Knee to the body)	3	
2019-09-15	Loss	(Thailand) Tapaokaew Singmawynn	Samui Festival + Kiatpetch	Ko Samui, Thailand	Decision	5	3:00
For the Samui Festival Kiatpetch 135 lbs title.
2019-08-03	Win	(Thailand) Yod ET Tded99	Lumpinee Stadium	Bangkok, Thailand	Decision	5	3:00
2019-01-13	Loss	(Thailand) Sakchainoi M.U.Den	Channel 7 Stadium	Bangkok, Thailand	TKO (Shoulder injury)	3	
2018-12-17	Win	(Thailand) Chai Sor.Jor.Toi Padrew	Sor.Sommai, Rajadamnern Stadium	Bangkok, Thailand	Decision	5	3:00
2018-10-14	Draw	(Brazil) Arnaldo De Franca	Super Champ	Bangkok, Thailand	Decision	3	3:00
2018-04-21	Loss	(Thailand) Komawut FA Group	Omnoi Stadium	Bangkok, Thailand	Decision	5	3:00
2018-03-18	Loss	(Thailand) Komawut FA Group	Blue Arena	Samut Prakan, Thailand	Decision	5	3:00
2018-02-02	Loss	(Thailand) Yamin Sor Jor.Wichitpaedriew	Lumpinee Stadium	Bangkok, Thailand	Decision	5	3:00
2017-11-15	Win	(Thailand) Chai Sor.Jor.Toi Padrew	Tor.Chaiwat, Rajadamnern Stadium	Bangkok, Thailand	Decision	5	3:00
2017-08-27	Win	(Thailand) Fahsatan Sit.Watcharachai	Rangsit Stadium	Rangsit, Thailand	Decision	5	3:00
2017-07-23	Win	(Thailand) Raksurin Kesagym	Rangsit Stadium	Rangsit, Thailand	KO (Right Elbow)	3	
2017-06-25	Draw	(Thailand) Samingyok Lukchumphon	Rangsit Stadium	Rangsit, Thailand	Decision	5	3:00
2017-04-29	Loss	(Thailand) Petchpikhat Kor Klanbut	Rangsit Stadium	Rangsit, Thailand	Decision	5	3:00
2017-03-26	Win	(Thailand) Jaruadsuk Kor.Kampanat	Rangsit Stadium	Rangsit, Thailand	KO (Knees to the body)	2	
2017-03-05	Win	(Thailand) Chalamsuk Nitisamui	Rangsit Stadium	Rangsit, Thailand	Decision	5	3:00
2017-01-29	Win	(Thailand) Chalamsuk Nitisamui	Rajadamnern Stadium	Bangkok, Thailand	TKO (Punches)	2	
2017-01-07	Win	(Thailand) Phetphadung Phetsimuen	Thanakorn Stadium	Nakhon Pathom Province, Thailand	TKO (Kicks)	2	
2016-08-06	Win	(Thailand) Ruenthai Dabpong	Thanakorn Stadium	Nakhon Pathom Province, Thailand	KO (Knee to the body)	4	
2016-05-07	Loss	(Thailand) Dennapho Sor.Thanyalak	Rangsit Stadium	Rangsit, Thailand	Decision	5	3:00
2016-05-01	Loss	(Thailand) PetchSamui Lukjaoporongtom	Muay Dee Vithithai, Rangsit Stadium	Rangsit, Thailand	Decision	5	3:00
2016-01-02	Loss	(Thailand) Rodtang Jitmuangnon	MAX Muay Thai	Pattaya, Thailand	KO (Punches)	2	
Legend: Win Loss Draw/No contest Notes
