= Yod-IQ Or.Pimolsri =

Thai Muay Thai fighter

Yod-IQ
- Born: April 2, 2002 (age 24); Buriram province, Thailand
- Other names: Yod-IQ P.K. Saenchai Muaythaigym (ยอดไอคิว พี.เค.แสนชัยมวยไทยยิม); Yod-IQ Or. Pimolsri; Yod-IQ Sor. Thanaphet (ยอดไอคิว ส.ธนาเพชร)
- Height: 177 cm (5 ft 10 in)
- Weight: 66 kg (146 lb; 10.4 st)
- Style: Muay Thai
- Stance: Orthodox
- Fighting out of: Bangkok, Thailand
- Team: PK Saenchai Muaythai Gym; Sor.Thanaphet

Other information
- Boxing record from BoxRec

Supakit Pannason (Thai: ศุภกิต พรรณสน; born April 2, 2002), known professionally as Yod-IQ Or. Pimolsri (Thai: ยอดไอคิว อ.พิมลศรี) is a Thai Muay Thai fighter. He currently competes in ONE Championship where he is the current ONE Bantamweight Muay Thai World Champion.

== Biography and career ==
=== Early career ===
Yod-IQ was inspired to start Muay Thai by action star Tony Jaa. His father served as his initial trainer before he joined the Sor.Thanaphet gym around eight years old in his native province of Buriram. After completing high school, he moved to Bangkok to pursue his career.

On January 13, 2017, Yod-IQ faced Petchdam Sit Kru-Thai for the Eminent Air promotion at the Lumpinee Stadium. He won the fight by decision.

On March 3, 2017, Yod-IQ defeated Petchsiri Sit DabMai by decision on the Petchkiatpetch promotion at the Lumpinee Stadium.

On June 17, 2017, Yod-IQ defeated Khaophong Por.Phetchmanee by decision on the Kiatpetch promotion at the Lumpinee Stadium.

On July 20, 2019, Yod-IQ defeated Diesellek T.M.B. Gym by decision at the Lumpinee Stadium.

On August 24, 2019, Yod-IQ faced Mahamongkol Wor.Wangphrom at the Lumpinee Stadium. He won the fight by decision.

On November 26, 2022, Yod-IQ travelled to Australia to face Chadd Collins at Rebellion Muay Thai XXVII with the vacant WBC Muay Thai World Super Lightweight title at stake. He lost the fight by unanimous decision.

=== ONE Championship ===
Yod-IQ made his ONE Championship debut at ONE Friday Fights 10 on March 24, 2023, against Samuel Bielen. He won the fight by second round knockout with an elbow strike.

On September 15, 2023, Yod-IQ faced Alexey Balyko at ONE Friday Fights 33. He lost the fight by unanimous decision.

On December 8, 2023, Yod-IQ faced Ilyas Musaev at ONE Friday Fights 44. He won the fight by split decision.

Yod-IQ faced Rafi Bohic on January 26, 2024, at ONE Friday Fights 49. He won the fight by unanimous decision.

On June 7, 2024, Yod-IQ rematched Mavlud Tupiev at ONE Friday Fights 66. He won the fight by first round knockout.

On October 4, 2024, Yod-IQ faced Abdulla Dayakaev at ONE Friday Fights 84. He won the fight by unanimous decision.

On November 29, 2024, Yod-IQ faced Kirill Khomutov at ONE Friday Fights 89. He won the fight by split decision.

On March 7, 2025, Yod-IQ defeated Petru Morari by unanimous decision at ONE Friday Fights 99.

On May 23, 2025, Yod-IQ defeated Brice Delval by unanimous decision at ONE Friday Fights 109.

On July 25, 2025 Yod-IQ faced Alessio Malatesta at ONE Friday Fights 117. He won the fight by unanimous decision.

On December 19, 2025, Yod-IQ rematched Alexey Balyko at ONE Friday Fights 137. He won the fight by first round knockout with a head kick. This victory earned him a $100,000 contract with ONE Championship.

On May 22, 2026, Yod-IQ faced Kiamran Nabati at ONE The Inner Circle 15. He won the fight by split decision.

Yod-IQ was scheduled to challenge Rambolek Chor.Ajalaboon for his ONE Championship Muay Thai Bantamweight world title at ONE Friday Fights 170 & The Inner Circle 30 on September 11, 2026. Rambolek missed weight and was stripped of the title while Yod-IQ passed and became the only fighter eligible to win the title.

== Titles and accomplishments ==
- ONE Championship
  - 2026 ONE Championship Muay Thai Bantamweight (145 lbs) World Champion (current)

== Fight record ==
Muay Thai Record
128 Wins, 36 Losses
Date	Result	Opponent	Event	Location	Method	Round	Time
2026-09-11	Win	(Thailand) Rambolek Chor.Ajalaboon	ONE The Inner Circle 30, Lumpinee Stadium	Bangkok, Thailand	Decision (Unanimous)	5	3:00
Wins the vacant ONE Championship Muay Thai Bantamweight (145 lbs) World title. Rambolek missed weight and was stripped the title, only Yod-IQ was eligible win the title.
2026-05-22	Win	(Russia) Kiamran Nabati	ONE The Inner Circle 15, Lumpinee Stadium	Bangkok, Thailand	Decision (Split)	3	3:00
2025-12-19	Win	(Russia) Alexey Balyko	ONE Friday Fights 137, Lumpinee Stadium	Bangkok, Thailand	KO (High kick)	1	2:04
2025-07-25	Win	(Italy) Alessio Malatesta	ONE Friday Fights 117, Lumpinee Stadium	Bangkok, Thailand	Decision (Unanimous)	3	3:00
2025-05-23	Win	(France) Brice Delval	ONE Friday Fights 109, Lumpinee Stadium	Bangkok, Thailand	Decision (Unanimous)	3	3:00
2025-03-07	Win	(Moldova) Petru Morari	ONE Friday Fights 99, Lumpinee Stadium	Bangkok, Thailand	Decision (Unanimous)	3	3:00
2024-11-29	Win	(Russia) Kirill Khomutov	ONE Friday Fights 89, Lumpinee Stadium	Bangkok, Thailand	Decision (Split)	3	3:00
2024-10-04	Win	(Russia) Abdulla Dayakaev	ONE Friday Fights 84, Lumpinee Stadium	Bangkok, Thailand	Decision (Unanimous)	3	3:00
2024-06-07	Win	(Uzbekistan) Mavlud Tupiev	ONE Friday Fights 66, Lumpinee Stadium	Bangkok, Thailand	KO (Body punches)	1	1:58
2024-01-26	Win	(France) Rafi Bohic	ONE Friday Fights 49, Lumpinee Stadium	Bangkok, Thailand	Decision (unanimous)	3	3:00
2023-12-08	Win	(Russia) Ilyas Musaev	ONE Friday Fights 44, Lumpinee Stadium	Bangkok, Thailand	Decision (Split)	3	3:00
2023-09-15	Loss	(Russia) Alexey Balyko	ONE Friday Fights 33, Lumpinee Stadium	Bangkok, Thailand	Decision (unanimous)	3	3:00
2023-06-09	Win	(Uzbekistan) Mavlud Tupiev	ONE Friday Fights 20, Lumpinee Stadium	Bangkok, Thailand	Decision (unanimous)	3	3:00
2023-03-24	Win	(Belgium) Samuel Bielen	ONE Friday Fights 10, Lumpinee Stadium	Bangkok, Thailand	KO (Elbow)	2	3:00
2022-11-26	Loss	(Australia) Chadd Collins	Rebellion Muay Thai XXVII	Melbourne, Australia	Decision (Unanimous)	5	3:00
For the vacant WBC Muay Thai World Super Lightweight (-63.5kg) title.
2022-08-06	Win	(Thailand) Kwangtung RealFighter	Fairtex Fight 24, Lumpinee Stadium	Bangkok, Thailand	Decision	3	3:00
2022-06-19	Win	(Thailand) Joroadsuek Kiatnavy	OrTorGor.3 Stadium	Nonthaburi province, Thailand	Decision	5	3:00
2022-04-16	Win	(Thailand) Teeradech Chor.Hapayak	Kwan Phayao Lakeside Park	Phayao Province, Thailand	Decision	5	3:00
2022-02-06	Win	(Thailand) Panpayak Sitchefboontham	Channel 7 Stadium	Bangkok, Thailand	Decision	5	3:00
2021-11-26	Loss	(Thailand) Ratchasing Petchyindee Academy	Muaymanwansuk, Rangsit Stadium	Pathum Thani, Thailand	Decision	5	3:00
2021-04-11	Win	(Thailand) Darky Por.Homklin	Amarin Super Fight, OrTorGor.3 Stadium	Nonthaburi province, Thailand	Decision	5	3:00
2021-02-20	Win	(Thailand) Traithep Por.Telakun	SuekJaoMuayThai, Siam Omnoi Stadium	Samut Sakhon, Thailand	KO	3	
2020-11-21	Loss	(Thailand) Petchthongchai Sor.Sommai	SuekJaoMuayThai, Siam Omnoi Stadium - Isuzu Cup	Samut Sakhon, Thailand	Decision	5	3:00
2020-10-24	Win	(Thailand) Hercules Phetsimean	SuekJaoMuayThai, Siam Omnoi Stadium - Isuzu Cup	Samut Sakhon, Thailand	Decision	5	3:00
2020-09-10	Win	(Thailand) Petchthongchai Sor.Sommai	Sor.Sommai, Rajadamnern Stadium	Bangkok, Thailand	Decision	5	3:00
2020-02-02	Win	(Thailand) Yutthakarn Petch P.T.O.	Chang Muay Thai Kiatpetch, Channel 7 Stadium	Bangkok, Thailand	Decision	5	3:00
2019-12-22	Loss	(Thailand) Petchsimok P.K. SaenchaiMuayThaiGym	Muay Thai 7see, Channel 7 Stadium	Bangkok, Thailand	Decision	5	3:00
2019-11-16	Win	(Thailand) Diesel Sor.Damnern	Lumpinee TKO Muay Thai, Lumpinee Stadium	Bangkok, Thailand	Decision	5	3:00
2019-09-15	Win	(Thailand) Sprinter PaengKongprap	Chang Muay Thai Kiatpetch, Lumpinee Stadium	Bangkok, Thailand	Decision	5	3:00
2019-08-24	Win	(Thailand) Mahamongkol Wor. Wangphrom	Muay Thai Petch Super Fight	Bangkok, Thailand	Decision	5	3:00
2019-07-20	Win	(Thailand) Diesellek T.M.B. Gym	Lumpinee TKO Muay Thai, Lumpinee Stadium	Bangkok, Thailand	Decision	5	3:00
2019-06-29	Win	(Thailand) Phetpeerapol Por.Permsap	Thor Nam Thai Lumpinee TKO, Lumpinee Stadium	Bangkok, Thailand	Decision	5	3:00
2019-06-01	Loss	(Thailand) Laemsing T-OneFightAcademy	Kiatpetch Super Fight, Lumpinee Stadium	Bangkok, Thailand	Decision	5	3:00
2019-04-20	Win	(Thailand) Banchachat Sit-Noomnoi-Saenmiam	Lumpinee TKO Muay Thai, Lumpinee Stadium	Bangkok, Thailand	Decision	5	3:00
2019-03-17	Win	(Thailand) Pan Parunchai	Chang Muay Thai Kiatpetch, Lumpinee Stadium	Bangkok, Thailand	KO	3	
2019-02-09	Win	(Thailand) Khiawpit Sor.Salacheep	Kiatpetch, Lumpinee Stadium	Bangkok, Thailand	Decision	5	3:00
2018-12-16	Loss	(Thailand) Chiebkhad Por.Pongsawang	Channel 7 Stadium	Bangkok, Thailand	Decision	5	3:00
2018-09-22	Loss	(Thailand) Chiebkhad Por.Pongsawang	Kiatpetch, Lumpinee Stadium	Bangkok, Thailand	Decision	5	3:00
2018-08-17	Win	(Thailand) Saengpichit TN MuayThai	Kiatpetch, Lumpinee Stadium	Bangkok, Thailand	Decision	5	3:00
2018-07-21	Win	(Thailand) Kularbdoi Sit-Nayak-Somchat	Kiatpetch, Lumpinee Stadium	Bangkok, Thailand	Decision	5	3:00
2018-06-16	Win	(Thailand) Saenrit Kor.Saengchan	Lumpinee TKO Muay Thai, Lumpinee Stadium	Bangkok, Thailand	KO	3	
2018-04-22	Loss	(Thailand) Alien Sor.Veerawan	Channel 7 Stadium	Bangkok, Thailand	KO	4	
2017-12-31	Win	(Thailand) Sam-A Somsak-Korsang	Channel 7 Stadium	Bangkok, Thailand	Decision	5	3:00
2017-12-03	Loss	(Thailand) Fes Erawan	Channel 7 Stadium	Bangkok, Thailand	Decision	5	3:00
2017-08-25	Loss	(Thailand) Pradungern Sit Buriram	Kiatpetch, Lumpinee Stadium	Bangkok, Thailand	Decision	5	3:00
2017-07-11	Loss	(Thailand) Saenchainoi ThanaiMichel	Kiatpetch, Lumpinee Stadium	Bangkok, Thailand	KO	4	
2017-06-17	Win	(Thailand) Khaophong Por.Phetchmanee	Kiatpetch, Lumpinee Stadium	Bangkok, Thailand	Decision	5	3:00
2017-04-21	Loss	(Thailand) Khaophong Por.Phetchmanee	Eminent Air, Lumpinee Stadium	Bangkok, Thailand	Decision	5	3:00
2017-03-31	Win	(Thailand) Rungphet Sor.Potkijchai	Kiatpetch, Lumpinee Stadium	Bangkok, Thailand	KO	4	
2017-03-03	Win	(Thailand) Petchsiri Sit DabMai	Petchkiatpetch, Lumpinee Stadium	Bangkok, Thailand	Decision	5	3:00
2017-01-13	Win	(Thailand) Petchdam Sit Kru-Thai	Eminet Air, Lumpinee Stadium	Bangkok, Thailand	Decision	5	3:00
Legend: Win Loss Draw/No contest Notes
