= Ferrari Fairtex =

Thai Muay Thai fighter

Ferrari
- Born: Kittiphop Mueangphram; August 1, 1997 (age 29); Khiri Rat Nikhom District, Surat Thani province, Thailand
- Other names: Ferrari Jakrayanmuaythai (เฟอรารี่ จักรยานมวยไทย)
- Height: 174 cm (5 ft 9 in)
- Weight: 65 kg (143 lb; 10.2 st)
- Stance: Orthodox
- Fighting out of: Bangkok, Thailand
- Team: Fairtex (2020-Present); Jakranyanmuaythai (2008-2020)

Kickboxing record
- Total: 173
- Wins: 136
- Losses: 34
- Draws: 2
- No contests: 1

Ferrari Fairtex (เฟอรารี่ แฟร์เท็กซ์) is a Thai Muay Thai fighter. He currently competes in the Bantamweight division for ONE Championship.

== Biography and career ==
Ferrari started training in muay thai at the age of 7 at the Kietrasada camp in Surat Thani. When he was 11 years old he joined the Jakrayanmuaythai camp in Nonthaburi.

On March 21, 2022 Ferrari defeated Tapaokaew Singmawynn by decision at Rajadamnern Stadium. This win positioned him as a strong candidate for the Sports Writers Association of Thailand Fighter of the Year award.

Ferrari faced Han Zihao at ONE 161 on September 29, 2022. At the weigh-ins, Han Zihao weighed in at 153.75 lb, 8.75 lb over the bantamweight non-title fight limit of 145 pounds. the bout agreed to moved to the featherweight division (145–155 lbs) where Han was fined 30%, which went to Ferrari Fairtex. He won the bout via unanimous decision.

Ferrari faced Fabio Reis on February 10, 2023, at ONE Friday Fights 4. He lost the fight via knockout in the second round.

Ferrari was scheduled to face Felipe Lobo on April 22, 2023, at ONE Fight Night 9. However, due to Ferrari lost Fabio Reis by knockout at ONE Friday Fights 4, he pulled out from the event and was replaced by Saemapetch Fairtex.

== Doping suspension ==
=== ONE Friday Fights 95 ===
On 5 March 2025 it was announced that Ferrari Fairtex failed a drug test after testing positive for heptaminol and octodrine, prior to ONE Friday Fights 95. He was suspended by One Championship for only 3 months.

== Titles and accomplishments ==
- Channel 7 Boxing Stadium
  - 2018 Channel 7 Stadium Lightweight (135 lbs) Champion
  - 2025 Channel 7 Stadium Super Welterweight (154 lbs) Champion
- International Federation of Muaythai Associations
  - 2019 IFMA World Championships -63.5 kg (bronze)

Awards

- 2021 Sports Writers Association of Thailand Fighter of the Year

== Fight record ==
Muay Thai Record
136 Wins, 33 Losses, 2 Draws, 1 No Contest
Date	Result	Opponent	Event	Location	Method	Round	Time
2026-12-18		(Brazil) Denis Souza Jr.	ONE Fight Night 50	Bangkok, Thailand			
2026-09-11	Win	(Brazil) Julio Lobo	ONE The Inner Circle 30, Lumpinee Stadium	Bangkok, Thailand	Decision (Split)	3	3:00
2026-06-27	Win	(Japan) Shinji Suzuki	ONE Fight Night 44	Bangkok, Thailand	Decision (Unanimous)	3	3:00
2025-12-21	Win	(Thailand) Hercules WanKongOhm.WKO	Channel 7 Boxing Stadium	Bangkok, Thailand	Decision	5	3:00
Wins the vacant Channel 7 Stadium Super Welterweight (154 lbs) title.
2025-08-29	Loss	(Thailand) Kongklai Sor.Sommai	ONE Friday Fights 122, Lumpinee Stadium	Bangkok, Thailand	KO (Left cross)	3	2:06
2025-01-31	NC	(Russia) Kiamran Nabati	ONE Friday Fights 95, Lumpinee Stadium	Bangkok, Thailand	NC (overturned)	1	1:56
Originally a KO (punch) win for Nabati; overturned after both fighters tested positive for banned substances.
2024-08-03	Loss	(Russia) Dmitrii Kovtun	ONE Fight Night 24, Lumpinee Stadium	Bangkok, Thailand	Decision (Unanimous)	3	3:00
2024-03-22	Win	(Uzbekistan) Mavlud Tupiev	ONE Friday Fights 56, Lumpinee Stadium	Bangkok, Thailand	Decision (Unanimous)	3	3:00
2024-01-12	Win	(Belarus) Antar Kacem	ONE Friday Fights 47, Lumpinee Stadium	Bangkok, Thailand	Decision (Unanimous)	3	3:00
2023-11-24	Win	(Russia) Kirill Khomutov	ONE Friday Fights 42, Lumpinee Stadium	Bangkok, Thailand	Decision (Unanimous)	3	3:00
2023-08-04	Win	(Russia) Ilyas Musaev	ONE Friday Fights 27, Lumpinee Stadium	Bangkok, Thailand	Decision (Unanimous)	3	3:00
2023-04-28	Loss	(Iran) Fariyar Aminipour	ONE Friday Fights 14, Lumpinee Stadium	Bangkok, Thailand	Decision (Unanimous)	3	3:00
2023-02-10	Loss	(Portugal) Fabio Reis	ONE Friday Fights 4, Lumpinee Stadium	Bangkok, Thailand	KO (punch)	2	2:30
2022-10-22	Win	(Thailand) Tapaokaew Singmawynn	Ruamponkon Samui: Samui Super Fight, Petchbuncha Stadium	Ko Samui, Thailand	Decision	5	3:00
2022-09-29	Win	(China) Han Zihao	ONE 161	Kallang, Singapore	Decision (Unanimous)	3	3:00
2022-07-06	Win	(Thailand) Phet-Utong Sor.Sommai	Muaythai Palangmai, Rajadamnern Stadium	Bangkok, Thailand	TKO (Referee stoppage)	4	
2022-05-09	Loss	(Thailand) Tapaokaew Singmawynn	Satun Super Fight	Satun province, Thailand	Decision	5	3:00
2022-03-21	Win	(Thailand) Tapaokaew Singmawynn	Singmawin, Rajadamnern Stadium	Bangkok, Thailand	Decision	5	3:00
2022-01-09	Win	(Thailand) Sangmanee Sor Tienpo	Channel 7 Boxing Stadium	Bangkok, Thailand	Decision	5	3:00
2021-11-16	Win	(Thailand) Nuenglanlek Jitmuangnon	Lumpinee GoSport + Kiatpetch, Lumpinee Stadium	Bangkok, Thailand	Decision	5	3:00
2021-10-17	Loss	(Thailand) Tapaokaew Singmawynn	Channel 7 Boxing Stadium	Bangkok, Thailand	Decision	5	3:00
2021-03-14	Win	(Thailand) Rittewada Sitthikul	Channel 7 Boxing Stadium	Bangkok, Thailand	Decision	5	3:00
2021-02-14	Win	(Thailand) Yodlekpet Or. Pitisak	Channel 7 Boxing Stadium	Bangkok, Thailand	Decision (Majority)	5	3:00
2020-12-13	Win	(Thailand) Thaksinlek Kiatniwat	Channel 7 Boxing Stadium	Bangkok, Thailand	Decision	5	3:00
2020-02-09	Win	(Thailand) Muangthai PKSaenchaimuaythaigym	Srithammaracha + Kiatpetch Super Fight	Nakhon Si Thammarat, Thailand	Decision	5	3:00
2020-01-10	Win	(Thailand) Thaksinlek Kiatniwat	Rajadamnern Stadium	Bangkok, Thailand	Decision	5	3:00
2019-10-05	Loss	(Thailand) Muangthai PKSaenchaimuaythaigym	Suek Muay Thai Vithee	Buriram, Thailand	Decision	5	3:00
2019-09-13	Win	(Thailand) Shadow Suanaharnpeekmai	Samui Festival + Kiatpetch	Ko Samui, Thailand	Decision	5	3:00
2019-06-26	Win	(Thailand) Mahadet Chor.Archariya	RuamponkonSamui + Kiatpetch Super Fight.	Surat Thani, Thailand	Decision	5	3:00
2019-05-10	Loss	(Thailand) Shadow Suanaharnpeekmai	Lumpinee Stadium	Bangkok, Thailand	Decision	5	3:00
2019-03-19	Loss	(Thailand) Kulabdam Sor.Jor.Piek-U-Thai	Lumpinee Stadium	Bangkok, Thailand	Decision	5	3:00
For the vacant Lumpinee Stadium 140lbs title
2019-02-10	Win	(Thailand) Inseethong Por.Peenapat	OrTorGor.3 Stadium	Nonthaburi, Thailand	Decision	5	3:00
2018-12-02	Loss	(Thailand) Sittisak Petpayathai	Channel 7 Boxing Stadium	Bangkok, Thailand	Decision	5	3:00
2018-09-26	Win	(Thailand) Patakthep SinbiMuayThai	Kiatpetch + Samui Super Fight	Ko Samui, Thailand	KO	5	
2018-08-12	Win	(Thailand) Jamesak SuperMuay	Channel 7 Boxing Stadium	Bangkok, Thailand	Decision	5	3:00
Wins the Channel 7 Boxing Stadium 135lbs title
2018-07-06	Win	(Thailand) Monkaw MUden	RuamponkonSamui	Ko Samui, Thailand	Decision	5	3:00
2018-06-05	Loss	(Thailand) Tawanchai PK Saenchaimuaythaigym	Lumpinee Stadium	Bangkok, Thailand	Decision	5	3:00
2018-05-01	Loss	(Thailand) Yok Parunchai	Lumpinee Stadium	Bangkok, Thailand	Decision	5	3:00
2018-03-06	Win	(Thailand) Sibsaen Tor.Aiwcharoenthongphuket	Lumpinee Stadium	Bangkok, Thailand	Decision	5	3:00
Wins 2 million baht side-bet.
2018-01-05	Win	(Thailand) Sakchanoi MUden	Lumpinee Stadium	Bangkok, Thailand	Decision	5	3:00
2017-12-08	Win	(Thailand) Taladkaek Saksamrit	Kiatpetch + Lumpinee Stadium 61st Birthday Anniversary	Bangkok, Thailand	Decision	5	3:00
2017-11-04	Loss	(Thailand) Taladkaek Saksamrit	Lumpinee Stadium	Bangkok, Thailand	Decision	5	3:00
2017-08-25	Win	(Thailand) Petchpradit MUden	Lumpinee Stadium	Bangkok, Thailand	Decision	5	3:00
2017-07-23	Win	(Thailand) Pornchainoi Mor.Rattanabundit	Channel 7 Boxing Stadium	Bangkok, Thailand	KO	4	
2017-06-03	Win	(Thailand) Jancherng Theglaff Pattaya	Lumpinee Stadium	Bangkok, Thailand	Decision	5	3:00
2017-04-30	Draw	(Thailand) Ponchainoi Teeded 99	Jitmuagnon Stadium	Bangkok, Thailand	Decision	5	3:00
2017-03-04	Loss	(Thailand) Kunhanlek Kiatjaroenchai	Lumpinee Stadium	Bangkok, Thailand	KO	5	
2017-02-08	Win	(Thailand) Phetpadong Phetsimean	Rajadamnern Stadium	Bangkok, Thailand	KO (Elbow)	2	
2017-01-17	Win	(Thailand) Phetnumchai Naratreekul	Lumpinee Stadium	Bangkok, Thailand	Decision	5	3:00
2016-12-16	Loss	(Thailand) Phetputhai Eminentair	Lumpinee Stadium	Bangkok, Thailand	Decision	5	3:00
2016-10-09	Loss	(Thailand) Ratanaphon Kiatphontip	Rajadamnern Stadium	Bangkok, Thailand	Decision	5	3:00
Legend: Win Loss Draw/No contest Notes

Amateur Muay Thai record
Date	Result	Opponent	Event	Location	Method	Round	Time
2019-07-26	Loss	(Ukraine) Igor Liubchenko	2019 IFMA World Championship, Semi Final	Bangkok, Thailand	Decision (29-28)	3	3:00
Wins 2019 IFMA World Championships -63.5kg Bronze Medal.
2019-07-25	Win	(France) Celestin Mendes	2019 IFMA World Championship, Quarter Final	Bangkok, Thailand	Decision (30-26)	3	3:00
2019-07-24	Win	(Turkmenistan) Adilbek Nurmetov	2019 IFMA World Championship, Second Round	Bangkok, Thailand	Decision (30-27)	3	3:00
2019-07-23	Win	(Sweden) Mathias Jonsson	2019 IFMA World Championship, First Round	Bangkok, Thailand	Decision (30-27)	3	3:00
Legend: Win Loss Draw/No contest Notes
