= ONE Friday Fights 4 =

Combat sport events in 2023

ONE Friday Fights 4: Duangsompong vs. Batman
- Promotion: ONE Championship
- Date: February 10, 2023
- Venue: Lumpinee Boxing Stadium
- City: Bangkok, Thailand

Event chronology
ONE Friday Fights 3: Chorfah vs. Phetsukumvit	ONE Friday Fights 4: Duangsompong vs. Batman	ONE Friday Fights 5: Kongklai vs. Superball

ONE Friday Fights 4: Duangsompong vs. Batman (also known as ONE Lumpinee 4) was a combat sports event produced by ONE Championship that took place on February 10, 2023, at Lumpinee Boxing Stadium in Bangkok, Thailand.

== Background ==
A flyweight muay thai bout between Batman Or.Atchariya and Duangsompong Jitmuangnon served as the event headliner.

== Results ==
Main card (YouTube / Facebook)
Weight class				Method	Round	Time	Notes
Flyweight Muay Thai	Duangsompong Jitmuangnon	def.	Batman Or.Atchariya	Decision (majority)	3	3:00
Flyweight Muay Thai	Petchmuangsri Tded99	def.	Mongkolkaew Sor.Sommai	Decision (unanimous)	3	3:00
Catchweight (148 lbs) Muay Thai	Erdem Taha Dincer	def.	Alessandro Sara	KO (punches)	1	2:05
Catchweight (112 lbs) Muay Thai	Francisca Vera	def.	Gusjung Fairtex	TKO (knee)	2	1:43
Flyweight Muay Thai	Chaongoh Jitmuangnon	def.	An Bunhour	TKO (punches)	1	1:07
Preliminary card (FanDuel TV)
Bantamweight Muay Thai	Fabio Reis	def.	Ferrari Fairtex	KO (punch)	2	2:30
Bantamweight	Bruno Azevedo	def.	Talekh Gamidov	Technical Submission (arm-triangle choke)	2	2:02
Bantamweight Kickboxing	Fariyar Aminipour	def.	Hiroki Suzuki	Decision (split)	3	3:00
Flyweight	Peter Danesoe	def.	Aqib Awan	TKO (knees)	1	4:33
Catchweight (128 lbs) Muay Thai	Malena Garcia	def.	Judy Humber	Decision (unanimous)	3	3:00

== Bonus awards ==
The following fighters received $10,000 bonuses.

- Performance of the Night: Erdem Taha Dincer, Francisca Vera, Chaongoh Jitmuangnon and Fabio Reis

== See also ==
- 2023 in ONE Championship
- List of ONE Championship events
- List of current ONE fighters
