= Brice Delval =

French-Algerian Muay Thai fighter

- Born: July 15, 1999 (age 27); Nice, France
- Other names: The Truck
- Nationality: Algerian; French
- Height: 1.78 m (5 ft 10 in)
- Weight: 65 kg (143 lb; 10.2 st)
- Style: Muay Thai
- Fighting out of: Paris, France
- Team: Mahmoudi Gym
- Trainer: Nordine Mahmoudi

Kickboxing record
- Total: 44
- Wins: 35
- Losses: 9

Brice Delval (born July 15, 1999) is a French-Algerian Muay Thai fighter.

Delval is a former S1 World Champion and has challenged for the ONE Muay Thai Bantamweight World Championship in 2019.

== Biography and career ==
Born in Nice on July 15, 1999, Brice Delval grew up on the African island of Réunion, off the coast of Madagascar.

At the age of 13, Delval left Réunion for Paris to pursue a Muay Thai career, where he joined the Mahmoudi Gym in Bonneuil-sur-Marne shortly after.

On August 12, 2016, he defeated Sae Sor. Ploenchit via second-round TKO to win the S1 World Championship 138lb title.

Brice Delval made his ONE Championship debut by challenging Nong-O Gaiyanghadao for the ONE Bantamweight Muay Thai World Championship at ONE Championship: Immortal Triumph on September 6, 2019. After five rounds, Delval lost by split decision.

Delval returned to ONE on January 10, 2020, at ONE Championship: A New Tomorrow, facing Muangthai PKSaenchaimuaythaigym. Despite keeping the fight close and competitive, Delval was unable to clinch a victory and lost by split decision once again.

== Titles and accomplishments ==
- Lumpinee Stadium
  - 2024 interim Lumpinee Stadium 150 lbs Champion
- Onesongchai Promotion
  - 2016 S1 World 138lbs Champion

== Fight record ==
Muay Thai record
35 Wins, 9 Losses, 2 Draws
Date	Result	Opponent	Event	Location	Method	Round	Time
2025-08-15	Win	(Turkey) Mert Aslan	ONE Friday Fights 120, Lumpinee Stadium	Bangkok, Thailand	TKo (3 Knockdowns)	3	2:09
2025-05-23	Loss	(Thailand) Yod-IQ Or.Pimolsri	ONE Friday Fights 109, Lumpinee Stadium	Bangkok, Thailand	Decision (Unanimous)	3	3:00
2024-12-08	Win	(Thailand) Rambo Mor.Rattanabandit	Lumpinee Champion + SKS Empire, Lumpinee Stadium	Bangkok, Thailand	Decision	3	3:00
Wins the interim Lumpinee Stadium (150 lbs) title.
2024-04-20	Draw	(Italy) Ignacio Tenaglia	Thai Boxe Mania 2024	Turin, Italy	Decision	3	3:00
2020-03-07	Loss	(France) Ibrahim Konaté	KFWC Savate Pro	Clermont-Ferrand, France	Decision (Unanimous)	3	2:00
2020-01-10	Loss	(Thailand) Muangthai PKSaenchaimuaythaigym	ONE Championship: A New Tomorrow	Bangkok, Thailand	Decision (Split)	3	3:00
2019-09-06	Loss	(Thailand) Nong-O Gaiyanghadao	ONE Championship: Immortal Triumph	Ho Chi Minh City, Vietnam	Decision (Split)	5	3:00
For the ONE Bantamweight Muay Thai World title
2018-05-26	Win	(Italy) Alessio D'Angelo	Wolf of the Ring	Milan, Italy	TKO (Injury)	1	
2018-02-27	Loss	(Thailand) Bangpleenoi 96Penang	Lumpinee Stadium	Bangkok, Thailand	Decision	5	3:00
2018-01-27	Draw	(Belarus) Maksim Petkevich	Thai Boxe Mania 2018	Turin, Italy	Decision	3	3:00
2017-12-31	Loss	(China) Zhang Chenglong	SEF	China	Decision	3	3:00
2017-06-29	Win	(Thailand) Janjao Sitsongpeenong	Best Of Siam XI	Paris, France	Decision	5	3:00
2017-05-27	Win	(Thailand) Padsaenlek Rachanon	THAI FIGHT Italy	Turin, Italy	Decision	3	3:00
2017-02-25	Loss	(Japan) Ren Hiramoto	K-1 World GP 2017 Lightweight Championship Tournament, Quarter Finals	Tokyo, Japan	Decision (Majority)	3	3:00
2017-01-28	Win	(Italy) Mathias Gallo Cassarino	Thai Boxe Mania 2017	Turin, Italy	Decision	3	3:00
2016-08-27	Win	(China) Liu Jie	Topking World Series	Chengdu, China	Decision	3	3:00
2016-08-12	Won	(Thailand) Sae Sor Ploenchit	S1 / Onesongchai Promotion	Bangkok, Thailand	TKO	2	
Wins the S1 World Championship 138lbs. title
2015-12-13	Win	(United Kingdom) Myk Estlick	John's 50th Birthday Party Event	Radcliffe, England	Decision	3	3:00
2015-05-23	Win	(Ukraine) Rustam Vyntu	Wolf of the Ring	Italy	Decision	3	3:00
Legend: Win Loss Draw/No contest Notes

== See also ==
- List of male kickboxers
