= Fariyar Aminipour =

Iranian Muay Thai kickboxer (2000–2024)

- Born: 31 July 2000; Saqqez, Kurdistan Province, Iran
- Died: 11 January 2024 (aged 23); Phuket, Thailand
- Native name: فریار امینی پور
- Nationality: Iranian
- Height: 1.78 m (5 ft 10 in)
- Weight: 65.8 kg (145 lb; 10.36 st)
- Style: Muay Thai
- Stance: Orthodox
- Fighting out of: Bangkok, Thailand
- Team: Tiger Muay Thai
- Years active: 2010–2023

Kickboxing record
- Total: 125
- Wins: 102
- Losses: 20
- Draws: 3

Fariyar Aminipour (Persian: فریار امینی پور, Sorani Kurdish: فەریار ئەمینی پوور; 31 July 2000 – 11 January 2024) was an Iranian kickboxer who was a member of the national Muay Thai team trained at Tiger Muay Thai. A kickboxer in the bantamweight division of ONE Championship, he was also a mixed martial artist.

== Life and career ==
Fariyar Aminipour was born in the city of Saqqez. He is of Kurdish descent. The presence of Iranian national team members in Muay Thai in this city made this athlete interested and enter the world of Muay Thai. He became a member of the Iranian national team in 2018. Later on, he signed a contract with the Southeast Asian promotion ONE Championship.

=== ONE Championship ===
Aminipour made his ONE debut on ONE Friday Fights 4 against Hiroki Suzuki on February 10, 2023. He won by split decision.

He faced Ferrari Fairtex on ONE Friday Fights 14 on April 28, 2023. Aminipour won the fight by unanimous decision.

He next fought Rambolek Chor Ajalaboon on ONE Friday Fights 22 on June 23, 2023. Aminipour won by majority decision.

Aminipour faced Pongsiri P.K.Saenchaimuaythaigym at ONE Friday Fights 29 on August 18, 2023. He defeated Pongsiri by unanimous decision to stay undefeated in ONE.

In his final fight, Aminipour faced Kulabdam Sor.Jor.Piek-U-Thai at ONE Friday Fights 46 on December 22, 2023. He lost the fight by first-round knockout.

== Death ==
Aminipour died in Chalong tunnel in Phuket, Thailand on 11 January 2024, allegedly due to a motorcycle accident. He was 23 years old.

Two weeks after his death he was buried in his birthtown of Saqqez on 26 January 2024. A huge crowd of Kurds attended his funeral and while chanting his name they requested officials to find out the main reason of his death.

After five fights with ONE Championship and experiencing success, Aminipour was one step away from a $100,000 contract with the promotion's main roster. He had four wins and one loss in his career and his last fight was held on December 22, 2023, at the Lumpini Stadium in Bangkok. He is considered one of the most successful Iranian fighters in East Asia, with wins over Hiroki Suzuki, Ferrari Fairtex, Rambolek Chor Ajalaboon, and Pongsiri P.K.Saenchaimuaythaigym.

== Fight record ==
Professional Kickboxing and Muay Thai record
14 Wins, 0 Loss
Date	Result	Opponent	Event	Location	Method	Round	Time
2023-12-22	Loss	(Thailand) Kulabdam Sor.Jor.Piek-U-Thai	ONE Friday Fights 46	Bangkok, Thailand	KO (Body punch)	1	2:51
2023-08-18	Win	(Thailand) Pongsiri PK Saenchai	ONE Friday Fights 29	Bangkok, Thailand	Decision (Unanimous)	3	3:00
2023-06-23	Win	(Thailand) Rambolek Chor Ajalaboon	ONE Friday Fights 22	Bangkok, Thailand	Decision (Majority)	3	3:00
2023-04-28	Win	(Thailand) Ferrari Fairtex	ONE Friday Fights 14, Lumpinee Stadium	Bangkok, Thailand	Decision (Unanimous)	3	3:00
2023-02-10	Win	(Japan) Hiroki Suzuki	ONE Friday Fights 4, Lumpinee Stadium	Bangkok, Thailand	Decision (Split)	3	3:00
2023-01-16	Win	(Thailand) Jomleela TitanFightClub	Bangla Boxing Stadium	Phuket, Thailand	KO (Left straight to the body)	3	
2022-12-17	Win	(Thailand) Saenkaeng SinbiMuaythai	Sinbi Fight Night	Phuket, Thailand	Decision	5	3:00
2022-11-26	Win	(Thailand) Denleypang CherngTalayMuaythai	BBQ Beatdown 144	Phuket, Thailand	KO (Left cross)	2	
