= Tapaokaew Singmawynn =

Thai Muay Thai fighter

- Born: Adisak Chupan; December 27, 2002 (age 23); Phatthalung, Thailand
- Other names: Tapaokaew Champabon (ตะเภาแก้ว จำป่าบอน); Taphaokaew Singamwin; Tapaokaew Singha Mawyn
- Nickname: The Bull
- Height: 176 cm (5 ft 9 in)
- Division: Lightweight; Super Lightweight; Welterweight
- Style: Muay Thai (Muay Khao)
- Stance: Orthodox
- Fighting out of: Bangkok, Thailand
- Team: Mawynn Muay Thai
- Years active: 2011-present

Kickboxing record
- Total: 106
- Wins: 82
- Losses: 22
- Draws: 2

Adisak Chupan (born December 27, 2002), known professionally as Tapaokaew Singmawynn (Thai: ตะเภาแก้ว สิงห์มาวิน), is a Thai Muay Thai fighter. He is a former Rajadamnern Stadium Welterweight Champion.

== Biography and career ==
Tapaokaew started training in Muay Thai at the age of 9, he competed under the name Tapaokaew Champabon.

Tapaokaew faced Sittisak Petpayathai for the Channel 7 title on October 20, 2019. He lost the bout by decision.

On October 15, 2020, Tapaokaew faced Yodlekpet Or.Atchariya for the Petchaophraya promotion at the Rajdamnern Stadium. He won the fight by decision.

Tapaokaew faced Siwakorn Kiatjaroenchai at the Channel 7 Stadium on April 4, 2021. The fight ended in a draw.

Tapaokew faced Ferrari Fairtex on October 17, 2021, at the Channel 7 Stadium. He won the fight by decision.

On March 21, 2022, Tapaokaew rematched Ferrari Fairtex at the Rajadamnern Stadium. He lost the fight by decision

Tapaokaew and Ferrari had a third fight on May 9, 2022, in the Satun province. He won the fight by decision.

As of July 2022 Tapaokaew was the #1 ranked Muay Thai fighter in the world at 147 lbs by both the WBC Muaythai and the World Muay Thai Organization.

On April 7, 2023, Tapaokaew made his debut for the ONE Championship promotion at ONE Friday Fights 12 against Rafi Bohic. He lost the bout by split decision.

Tapaokaew had his second fight under the ONE banner on August 4, 2023 ONE Friday Fights 27 where he faced Tyson Harrison. He lost by first-round knockout due to an uppercut.

Tapaokaew was schedulked to face Capitan Petchyindee Academy on December 27, 2023, for the Rajadamnern Stadium birthday show. He won the fight by decision.

Tapaokaew was scheduled to challenge Hercules Wor.Jakrawut for his Rajadamnern Stadium Welterweight (147 lbs) title on May 4, 2024. He won the fight by unanimous decision.

== Titles and accomplishments ==
- Kiatpetch Promotion
  - 2019 Samui Festival Kiatpetch 135 lbs Champion
- Rajadamnern Stadium
  - 2024 Rajadamnern Stadium Welterweight (147 lbs) Champion
    - Three successful title defenses

== Fight record ==
Muay Thai Record
Date	Result	Opponent	Event	Location	Method	Round	Time
2026-10-31	Win	(Morocco) Ossam Ben Elhaou	Rajadamnern World Series	Bangkok, Thailand	TKO (low kicks)	2	0:35
2026-07-11	Loss	(Republic of Ireland) Niall McGreevy	Rajadamnern World Series	Bangkok, Thailand	KO (Elbow)	2	1:20
Loses the Rajadamnern Stadium Welterweight (147 lbs) title.
2026-03-07	Win	(Thailand) Saenpon Sor.Sommai	Rajadamnern World Series	Bangkok, Thailand	Decision (Unanimous)	5	3:00
Defends the Rajadamnern Stadium Welterweight (147 lbs) title.
2025-11-15	Win	(France) Alexis Laugeois	Rajadamnern World Series	Bangkok, Thailand	TKO (Knees)	3	
Defends the Rajadamnern Stadium Welterweight (147 lbs) title.
2025-08-09	Win	(Thailand) Nuenglanlek Jitmuangnon	Rajadamnern World Series	Bangkok, Thailand	Decision (Unanimous)	5	3:00
Defends the Rajadamnern Stadium Welterweight (147 lbs) title.
2025-06-21	Win	(China) Li Jialong	Rajadamnern World Series	Bangkok, Thailand	TKO (Knees)	2	1:20
2024-12-07	Loss	(Thailand) Hercules Wor.Jakrawut	Rajadamnern World Series - Final	Bangkok, Thailand	Decision (Split)	5	3:00
For the 2024 Rajadamnern World Series Welterweight (147 lbs) title.
2024-10-19	Win	(Thailand) Yodwicha Por.Boonsit	Rajadamnern World Series - Final 4	Bangkok, Thailand	Decision (Unanimous)	3	3:00
2024-09-07	Win	(Thailand) Saenpon Sor.Sommai	Rajadamnern World Series - Group Stage	Bangkok, Thailand	Decision (Unanimous)	3	3:00
2024-08-03	Win	(Turkey) Erdem Dincer	Rajadamnern World Series - Group Stage	Bangkok, Thailand	Decision (Unanimous)	3	3:00
2024-06-22	Win	(Thailand) Chujaroen Dabransarakarm	Rajadamnern World Series - Group Stage	Bangkok, Thailand	Decision (Split)	3	3:00
2024-05-04	Win	(Thailand) Hercules Wor.Jakrawut	Rajadamnern World Series	Bangkok, Thailand	Decision (Unanimous)	5	3:00
Wins the Rajadamnern Stadium Welterweight (147 lbs) title.
2024-02-13	Loss	(Thailand) Chujaroen Dabransarakarm	Muaymansananmuang Sarakham	Maha Sarakham province, Thailand	Decision	5	3:00
2023-12-27	Win	(Thailand) Capitan Petchyindee Academy	Rajadamnern Stadium 78th Birthday Show	Bangkok, Thailand	Decision	5	3:00
2023-11-25	Win	(France) Jessim Jaiem	Rajadamnern World Series	Bangkok, Thailand	Decision (Unanimous)	3	3:00
2023-10-28	Win	(Italy) Alessandro Sara	Muay Thai Vithee TinThai + Kiatpetch	Buriram province, Thailand	TKO	2	
2023-08-04	Loss	(Australia) Tyson Harrison	ONE Friday Fights 27, Lumpinee Stadium	Bangkok, Thailand	KO (Uppercut)	1	2:20
2023-04-07	Loss	(France) Rafi Bohic	ONE Friday Fights 12	Bangkok, Thailand	Decision (Split)	3	3:00
2022-11-18	Win	(Thailand) Yodlekpet Or.Atchariya	Ruamponkon + Prachin	Prachinburi province, Thailand	Decision	5	3:00
2022-10-22	Loss	(Thailand) Ferrari Fairtex	Ruamponkon Samui: Samui Super Fight, Petchbuncha Stadium	Ko Samui, Thailand	Decision	5	3:00
2022-08-13	Win	(Thailand) Hercules Phetsimean	Ruamponkon Samui, Petchbuncha Stadium	Ko Samui, Thailand	Decision	5	3:00
2022-05-09	Win	(Thailand) Ferrari Fairtex	Satun Super Fight	Satun province, Thailand	Decision	5	3:00
2022-03-21	Loss	(Thailand) Ferrari Fairtex	Singmawin, Rajadamnern Stadium	Bangkok, Thailand	Decision	5	3:00
2021-11-26	Win	(Thailand) Sangmanee Sor.KafaeMuayThai	Muay Thai Moradok Kon Thai + Rajadamnern Super Fight	Buriram, Thailand	Decision	5	3:00
2021-10-17	Win	(Thailand) Ferrari Fairtex	Channel 7 Boxing Stadium	Bangkok, Thailand	Decision	5	3:00
2021-04-04	Draw	(Thailand) Siwakorn Kiatjaroenchai	Channel 7 Boxing Stadium	Bangkok, Thailand	Decision	5	3:00
2020-12-18	Loss	(Thailand) Nuenglanlek Jitmuangnon	Singmawynn	Songkhla, Thailand	TKO (Doctor stoppage/cut)	3	
2020-10-15	Win	(Thailand) Yodlekpet Or.Atchariya	Petchaophraya, Rajadamnern Stadium	Bangkok, Thailand	Decision	5	3:00
2020-08-13	Win	(Brazil) Lobo PhuketFightClub	Singmawin, Rajadamnern Stadium	Bangkok, Thailand	Decision	5	3:00
2020-02-17	Win	(Thailand) Teeradet Chor.Hapayak	Singmawin, Rajadamnern Stadium	Bangkok, Thailand	Decision	5	3:00
2019-10-20	Loss	(Thailand) Sittisak Petpayathai	Channel 7 Boxing Stadium	Bangkok, Thailand	Decision	5	3:00
For the Channel 7 Boxing Stadium Lightweight (135 lbs) title.
2019-09-15	Win	(Thailand) Nuathoranee Samchaivisetsuk	Samui Festival + Kiatpetch	Ko Samui, Thailand	Decision	5	3:00
Wins the Samui Festival Kiatpetch Lightweight (135 lbs) title.
2019-08-19	Win	(Thailand) Nakrob Fairtex	Singmawin, Rajadamnern Stadium	Bangkok, Thailand	Decision	5	3:00
2019-07-06	Win	(Thailand) Chalermchai P.K.SaenchaiMuayThai	Lumpinee Stadium	Bangkok, Thailand	KO	4	
2018-11-18	Win	(Thailand) Kritpetch Rattanaphanu	Channel 7 Boxing Stadium	Bangkok, Thailand	KO (Left hook)	3	
2018-09-22	Win	(Thailand) Black Panther VenumMuayThai	Lumpinee Stadium	Bangkok, Thailand	Decision	5	3:00
2018-08-17	Loss	(Thailand) Black Panther VenumMuayThai	Kiatpetch, Lumpinee Stadium	Bangkok, Thailand	Decision	5	3:00
2018-07-07	Loss	(Thailand) Dennongphluang Por Cherdchai	Lumpinee Stadium	Bangkok, Thailand	Decision	5	3:00
2018-05-20	Draw	(Thailand) Saengmorakot Por.Charoenphaet	Channel 7 Boxing Stadium	Bangkok, Thailand	Decision	5	3:00
2018-03-09	Win	(Thailand) Saengmorakot Por.Charoenphaet	Petchkiatpetch, Lumpinee Stadium	Bangkok, Thailand	Decision	5	3:00
2017-11-21	Win	(Thailand) Jojo Paeminburi	Kiatpetch, Lumpinee Stadium	Bangkok, Thailand	Decision	5	3:00
2017-09-10	Win	(Thailand) Khunthep Numyin-Club	Chang Muay Thai Kiatpetch, Jitmuangnon Stadium	Bangkok, Thailand	Decision	5	3:00
2017-07-29	Loss	(Thailand) Jojo Paeminburi	Lumpinee TKO, Lumpinee Stadium	Bangkok, Thailand	Decision	5	3:00
2017-03-15	Win	(Thailand) Sakaengam Jitmuangnon	Jitmuangnon, Rajadamnern Stadium	Bangkok, Thailand	Decision	5	3:00
2017-01-15	Win	(Thailand) Wanchainoi Sitsarawatseur	Channel 7 Boxing Stadium	Bangkok, Thailand	Decision	5	3:00
2016-10-11	Win	(Thailand) Seua Por.Charoenphaet	Paedriew, Lumpinee Stadium	Bangkok, Thailand	Decision	5	3:00
2016-09-20	Loss	(Thailand) Chanyuth Sakrungruang	R Airlines, Lumpinee Stadium	Bangkok, Thailand	Decision	5	3:00
2016-07-01	Win	(Thailand) Tongsiam Wor.Suriyat	R Airlines, Lumpinee Stadium	Bangkok, Thailand	Decision	5	3:00
2016-05-06	Win	(Thailand) Tongsiam Wor.Suriyat	R Airlines, Lumpinee Stadium	Bangkok, Thailand	Decision	5	3:00
Legend: Win Loss Draw/No contest Notes
