= Petchthongchai Sor.Sommai =

Thai Muay Thai fighter

Petchthongchai
- Born: Narongchai Chaithong; July 12, 2000 (age 26); Surat Thani province, Thailand
- Other names: Phetthongchai TBM.Gym (เพชรธงชัย ทีบีเอ็ม.ยิม); Petchtongchai Kiatthongkheaw (เพชรธงชัย เกียรติธงเขียว); Pettongchai
- Height: 185 cm (6 ft 1 in)
- Weight: 63 kg (139 lb; 9.9 st)
- Style: Muay Thai (Muay Khao)
- Stance: Orthodox
- Fighting out of: Bangkok, Thailand
- Team: Sor.Sommai (2024-Present); TBM Gym (2019-2023)

Kickboxing record
- Total: 110
- Wins: 84
- Losses: 24
- Draws: 2

Petchthongchai Sor.Sommai (Thai: เพชรธงชัย ส.สมหมาย) is a Thai Muay Thai fighter.

== Career ==
In 2020 Petchthongchai was announced as one of the eight contestants in the 31st Isuzu Cup happening at 138 lbs and taking place at the Omnoi Stadium. Petchthongchai faced Hercules Wor.Jakrawut on February 13, 2021, as part of the group stage of the Isuzu Cup. He lost the fight by decision.

On April 10, 2021, Petchthongchai faced Petchamnee Por.Lakboon as the semi final of the Isuzu Cup. He won the fight by decision and qualified for the 31st Isuzu Cup Final.

On February 19, 2022, Petchthongchai rematched Hercules Wor.Jakrawut in the final of the 31st Isuzu Cup at the Omnoi Stadium. The fight had been postponed for nine months due to the COVID-19 pandemic. Petchthongchai won the fight by decision and took home the prize consisting of a million baht, a pickup truck and a contract with the Thai Fight promotion.

Petchthongchai made his Thai Fight debut on May 8, 2022, at THAI FIGHT Sung Noen where he faced Suksawat Saengmorakot. He won the fight by decision.

October 16, 2022, Petchthongchai faced Ali Ghodratisaraskan at THAI FIGHT. He won the fight by second round knockout to advance to the semi finals stage of the 2022 Thai Fight King's Cup.

November 20, 2022, Petchthongchai defeated Elit Samphors by decision at THAI FIGHT Vana Nava Hua Hin and qualified for the 2022 Thai Fight King's Cup Final.

On December 24, 2022, Petchthongchai faced Theeradet Chor.Hapayak in the Thai Fight 67 kg King's Cup Final. He won the fight by decision.

In 2023 Petchthongchai entered the Rajadamnern World Series tournament in the Super Lightweight division. On July 15, 2023, Petchthongchai defeated Sakulchailek Pangkongpap by unanimous decision for his last group stage match and qualified for the Final 4 of the competition. On August 19, 2023 Petchthongchai faced Nuenglanlek Jitmuangnon in the RWS Final 4. He lost the fight by unanimous decision.

On October 30, 2023, Petchthongchai faced Siwakorn Kiatcharoenchai at a Muay Thai Pantamit + Sor.Salacheep promotes event in the Lopburi province. He won the fight by decision.

On March 2, 2024, Petchthongchai faced Dam Parunchai with his Rajadamnern Stadium Super Lightweight (140 lbs) title at play on a Rajadamnern World Series event. He lost the fight by unanimous decision.

In 2024 Petchthongchai reentered the Rajadamnern World Series in the 140 lbs division. For his first group match he faced Turach Novruzov on June 29, 2024. Petchthongchai won the fight by unanimous decision.

On December 7, 2024, Petchthongchai faced Dam Parunchai for the third time in the final of the 2024 Rajadamnern World Series 140 lbs tournament. Petchthongchai won the fight by unanimous decision.

== Titles and accomplishments ==
- Rajadamnern Stadium
  - 2023 Rajadamnern Stadium Super Lightweight (140 lbs) Champion
  - 2024 Rajadamnern World Series Super Lightweight (140 lbs) Winner
- THAI FIGHT
  - 2022 THAI FIGHT King's Cup -67kg Champion
- Omnoi Stadium
  - 2022 31st Isuzu Cup Winner
- Southeast Asian Games
  - 2025 SEA Games Muaythai -71 kg (gold)
- International Federation of Muaythai Associations
  - 2025 IFMA Asian Championship -71 kg (gold)

== Fight record ==
Professional Muay Thai record
84 Wins, 24 Losses, 2 Draws
Date	Result	Opponent	Event	Location	Method	Round	Time
2026-07-25	Win	(Iran) Sajad Sattari	Rajadamnern World Series	Bangkok, Thailand	Decision (Unanimous)	3	3:00
2026-04-25	Win	(Russia) Leonid Kostin	Rajadamnern World Series	Bangkok, Thailand	Decision (Unanimous)	3	3:00
2025-12-29	Win	(Brazil) Julio Lobo	Phetchbuncha Stadium 21st Anniversary show	Ko Samui, Thailand	Decision	5	3:00
2025-10-04	Win	(Italy) Francesco Porcu	Rajadamnern World Series	Bangkok, Thailand	Decision (Unanimous)	3	3:00
2025-07-26	Win	(Thailand) Khunhanlek SinghaMawynn	Rajadamnern World Series	Bangkok, Thailand	Decision (Unanimous)	3	3:00
2025-04-19	Win	(Slovakia) Jozef Molnar	Rajadamnern World Series, Rajadamnern Stadium	Bangkok, Thailand	Decision (Unanimous)	3	3:00
2024-12-07	Win	(Thailand) Dam Parunchai	Rajadamnern World Series - Final Rajadamnern Stadium	Bangkok, Thailand	Decision (Unanimous)	5	3:00
Wins the 2024 Rajadamnern World Series Super Lightweight (140 lbs) title.
2024-10-26	Win	(England) Alfie Pearse	Rajadamnern World Series - Final 4, Rajadamnern Stadium	Bangkok, Thailand	Decision (Unanimous)	3	3:00
2024-09-14	Win	(Thailand) Khunhanlek SinghaMawynn	Rajadamnern World Series - Group Stage, Rajadamnern Stadium	Bangkok, Thailand	Decision (Unanimous)	3	3:00
2024-06-29	Win	(Azerbaijan) Turach Novurov	Rajadamnern World Series - Group Stage, Rajadamnern Stadium	Bangkok, Thailand	Decision (Unanimous)	3	3:00
2024-05-25	Win	(France) Damien Alamos	Rebellion Muaythai	Melbourne, Australia	Decision (Unanimous)	5	3:00
2024-04-27	Loss	(Thailand) Dam Parunchai	Ruangchaijao Surat	Surat Thani, Thailand	Decision	5	3:00
2024-03-02	Loss	(Thailand) Dam Parunchai	Rajadamnern World Series, Rajadamnern Stadium	Bangkok, Thailand	Decision (Unanimous)	5	3:00
Loses the Rajadamnern Stadium Super Lightweight (140 lbs) title.
2023-12-16	Win	(Thailand) Chujaroen Dabransarakarm	Rajadamnern World Series	Bangkok, Thailand	Decision	5	3:00
Wins the vacant Rajadamnern Stadium Super Lightweight (140 lbs) title.
2023-10-30	Win	(Thailand) Siwakorn Kiatcharoenchai	Muay Thai Pantamit + Sor.Salacheep	Lopburi province, Thailand	Decision	5	3:00
2023-08-19	Loss	(Thailand) Nuenglanlek Jitmuangnon	Rajadamnern World Series - Final 4	Bangkok, Thailand	Decision (Unanimous)	3	3:00
2023-07-15	Win	(Thailand) Sakulchailek Pangkongpap	Rajadamnern World Series - Group Stage	Bangkok, Thailand	Decision (Unanimous)	3	3:00
2023-06-10	Win	(Thailand) Capitan Petchyindee Academy	Rajadamnern World Series - Group Stage	Bangkok, Thailand	Decision (Unanimous)	3	3:00
2023-04-22	Loss	(Turkey) Erdem Dincer	Rajadamnern World Series - Group Stage	Bangkok, Thailand	KO (Right cross)	2	1:33
2023-03-25	Win	(Thailand) Tongsiam Kiatsongrit	Rajadamnern World Series - Group Stage	Bangkok, Thailand	Decision (Unanimous)	3	3:00
2022-12-24	Win	(Thailand) Teeradet Chor.Hapayak	Thai Fight: Metropolitan Police Bureau 100th Anniversary	Bangkok, Thailand	Decision	3	3:00
Wins the 2022 THAI FIGHT King's Cup -67kg title.
2022-11-20	Win	(Cambodia) Elit Samphors	THAI FIGHT Vana Nava Hua Hin	Hua Hin district, Thailand	Decision	3	3:00
2022-10-16	Win	(Iran) Ali Ghodratisaraskan	THAI FIGHT Vajiravudh	Bangkok, Thailand	KO (Elbow)	2	
2022-09-23	Win	(Thailand) Petchmanee Por.Lakboon	Lumpini Muay Thai Pitaktham Fight, Lumpinee Stadium	Bangkok, Thailand	Decision	5	3:00
2022-08-02	Win	(Italy) Alex Jitmuangnon	Lumpini Muay Thai Pitaktham Fight, Lumpinee Stadium	Bangkok, Thailand	Decision	5	3:00
2022-07-06	Loss	(Italy) Alex Jitmuangnon	Muay Thai Palangmai, Rajadamnern Stadium	Bangkok, Thailand	Decision	5	3:00
2022-05-08	Win	(Thailand) Suksawat Saengmorakot	THAI FIGHT Sung Noen	Sung Noen district, Thailand	Decision	3	3:00
2022-02-19	Win	(Thailand) Hercules Wor.Jakrawut	SuekJaoMuayThai, Siam Omnoi Stadium - Isuzu Cup Final	Samut Sakhon, Thailand	Decision	5	3:00
Wins the 31st Isuzu Cup title.
2021-04-10	Win	(Thailand) Petchmanee Por.Lakboon	SuekJaoMuayThai, Siam Omnoi Stadium - Isuzu Cup Semi Final	Samut Sakhon, Thailand	Decision	5	3:00
2021-02-13	Loss	(Thailand) Hercules Wor.Jakrawut	SuekJaoMuayThai, Siam Omnoi Stadium - Isuzu Cup	Samut Sakhon, Thailand	Decision	5	3:00
2020-11-21	Win	(Thailand) Yod-IQ PK.Saenchai	SuekJaoMuayThai, Siam Omnoi Stadium - Isuzu Cup	Samut Sakhon, Thailand	Decision	5	3:00
2020-10-17	Win	(Thailand) Traitep Por.Telakun	Siam Omnoi Stadium - Isuzu Cup	Samut Sakhon, Thailand	TKO (Knees)	4	
2020-09-10	Loss	(Thailand) Yod-IQ PK.Saenchai	Sor.Sommai, Rajadamnern Stadium	Bangkok, Thailand	Decision	5	3:00
2020-07-18	Win	(Thailand) Wanpanlan Pumpanmuang	JaoMuayThai, Siam Omnoi Stadium	Samut Sakhon, Thailand	Decision	5	3:00
2020-03-12	Win	(Thailand) Karuhat Sitchefboontham	Sor.Sommai, Rajadamnern Stadium	Bangkok, Thailand	Decision	5	3:00
2020-01-01	Win	(Thailand) Supmanee EnnieMuayThai	Singmawin, Rajadamnern Stadium	Bangkok, Thailand	Decision	5	3:00
2019-11-23	Win	(Thailand) Jack ApichartMuaythai	JaoMuayThai, Siam Omnoi Stadium	Samut Sakhon, Thailand	Decision	5	3:00
2019-09-16	Win	(Thailand) Jack ApichartMuaythai	Sor.Sommai, Rajadamnern Stadium	Bangkok, Thailand	Decision	5	3:00
2019-08-05	Win	(Thailand) Samingdong Sor.Chatri	Sor.Sommai, Rajadamnern Stadium	Bangkok, Thailand	Decision	5	3:00
2019-06-20	Loss	(Thailand) Samingdong Sor.Chatri	Sor.Sommai, Rajadamnern Stadium	Bangkok, Thailand	TKO	2	
Legend: Win Loss Draw/No contest Notes

Amateur Muay Thai record
Date	Result	Opponent	Event	Location	Method	Round	Time
2025-12-17	Win	(Vietnam) Bang Quang Thang	SEA Games 2025, Final	Samut Prakan, Thailand	Decision	3	3:00
Wins the 2025 SEA Games Muay Thai -71kg Gold Medal.
2025-12-16	Win	(Myanmar) Tun Min Aung	SEA Games 2025, Semifinals	Samut Prakan, Thailand	Decision	3	3:00
2025-06-25	Win	(Kazakhstan) Nurtaza Jumakhanov	IFMA Asian Championship 2025, Final	Thái Nguyên, Vietnam	Decision (30:27)	3	3:00
Wins the IFMA 2025 Asia Championship -71kg Gold Medal.
2025-06-24	Win	(New Zealand) Neihana Uerata-Wood	IFMA Asian Championship 2025, Semifinals	Thái Nguyên, Vietnam	TKO	1	
2025-06-22	Win	(Nepal) Sangam Kayastha	IFMA Asian Championship 2025, Quarterfinals	Thái Nguyên, Vietnam	DQ		
Legend: Win Loss Draw/No contest Notes
