= Hercules Phetsimean =

Thai professional Muay Thai fighter

- Born: Pharadorn Phoplot; December 19, 2002 (age 23); Bang Khan, Thailand
- Other names: Hercules Gor.Rattanasak (เฮอคิวลิสว ก.รัตนศักดิ์); Hercules Wor.Jakrawut (เฮอคิวลิสว ว.จักรวุฒิ); Hercules WanKongOhm MBK; Hercules WanKongOhm.WKO (เฮอคิวลิส วันของโอม.WKO)
- Height: 183 cm (6 ft 0 in)
- Division: Mini Flyweight; Super Lightweight; Welterweight; Super Welterweight
- Style: Muay Thai; Muay Khao
- Stance: Orthodox
- Fighting out of: Thung Song, Thailand
- Team: Phetsimuen
- Years active: c. 2010 – present

Kickboxing record
- Total: 86
- Wins: 63
- Losses: 23

Pharadorn Phoplot (born December 19, 2002), known professionally as Hercules Phetsimean (Thai: เฮอคิวลิส เพชรสี่หมื่น), is a Thai professional Muay Thai fighter. He is a one-time Lumpinee Stadium champion and two-time Rajadamnern Stadium champion across two divisions.

== Biography ==
Hercules started Muay Thai at 8 years old in a small gym in his native province of Nakhon Si Thammarat. After joining Phetsimean gym Hercules quickly started competing in the Bangkok circuit and managed to become Lumpinee and Rajadamnern Stadium champion by the age of 15.

AIn December 2018 Hercules lost his Rajadamnern Stadium title to Nadaka Yoshinari in Japan. Following that Hercules gained weight and relinquished his Lumpinee Stadium 105 lbs belt. He then went through weight classes at fast pace. In September 2020 he officially engaged in the Omnoi Stadium annual Isuzu Cup at 140lbs. Hercules lost his first fight counting for the Isuzu Cup against YodIQ P.K.Saenchaimuaythaigym by decision on October 24.

== Titles and accomplishments ==
- Lumpinee Stadium
  - 2018 Lumpinee Stadium Mini Flyweight (105 lbs) Champion
- Rajadamnern Stadium
  - 2018 Rajadamnern Stadium Mini Flyweight (105 lbs) Champion
  - 2023 Rajadamnern World Series Tournament Welterweight (147 lbs) Runner-up
  - 2023 Rajadamnern Stadium Welterweight (147 lbs) Champion
    - One successful title defense
  - 2024 Rajadamnern World Series Tournament Welterweight (147 lbs) Winner
- Omnoi Stadium
  - 2021 Isuzu Cup Runner-up
- International Federation of Muaythai Associations
  - 2022 IFMA World Championships U-23 −67 kg (silver)

== Fight record ==
Muay Thai Record
Date	Result	Opponent	Event	Location	Method	Round	Time
2026-04-18	Loss	(Switzerland) Dani Rodriguez	Rajadamnern World Series, Rajadamnern Stadium	Bangkok, Thailand	KO (Punches)	4	0:56
For the Rajadamnern Stadium Super Welterweight (154 lbs) title.
2025-12-21	Loss	(Thailand) Ferrari Fairtex	Channel 7 Boxing Stadium	Bangkok, Thailand	Decision	5	3:00
For the vacant Channel 7 Stadium Super Welterweight (154 lbs) title.
2025-11-15	Loss	(Bulgaria) Stoyan Koprivlenski	K-1 World MAX 2025 - World Championship Tournament Final, Quarterfinals	Tokyo, Japan	Decision (Unanimous)	3	3:00
2025-08-09	Win	(Morocco) Ahmed El Hamdouni	Rajadamnern World Series	Bangkok, Thailand	Decision (Unanimous)	3	3:00
2025-05-03	Win	(Thailand) Chujaroen Dabransarakarm	Rajadamnern World Series	Bangkok, Thailand	Decision (Unanimous)	3	3:00
2024-12-07	Win	(Thailand) Tapaokaew Singmawynn	Rajadamnern World Series - Final	Bangkok, Thailand	Decision (Split)	5	3:00
Wins the 2024 Rajadamnern World Series Welterweight (147 lbs) title.
2024-10-19	Win	(Turkey) Erdem Dincer	Rajadamnern World Series - Final 4	Bangkok, Thailand	Decision (Unanimous)	3	3:00
2024-09-07	Win	(Australia) Max McVicker	Rajadamnern World Series - Group Stage	Bangkok, Thailand	Decision (Unanimous)	3	3:00
2024-08-03	Win	(Thailand) Yodwicha Por.Boonsit	Rajadamnern World Series - Group Stage	Bangkok, Thailand	Decision (Unanimous)	3	3:00
2024-06-22	Win	(Iran) Sajad Sattari	Rajadamnern World Series - Group Stage	Bangkok, Thailand	Decision (Unanimous)	3	3:00
2024-05-04	Loss	(Thailand) Tapaokaew Singmawynn	Rajadamnern World Series	Bangkok, Thailand	Decision (Unanimous)	5	3:00
Loses the Rajadamnern Stadium Welterweight (147 lbs) title.
2024-01-27	Win	(Turkey) Erdem Dincer	Rajadamnern World Series	Bangkok, Thailand	Decision (Unanimous)	5	3:00
Defends the Rajadamnern Stadium Welterweight (147 lbs) title.
2023-12-02	Win	(Turkey) Erdem Dincer	Rajadamnern World Series	Bangkok, Thailand	Decision (split)	5	3:00
Wins the Rajadamnern Stadium Welterweight (147 lbs) title.
2023-10-07	Loss	(Thailand) Rittewada Petchyindee Academy	Rajadamnern World Series - Final	Bangkok, Thailand	KO (Elbow)	3	
For the 2023 Rajadamnern World Series Welterweight (147 lbs) title.
2023-09-02	Win	(Thailand) Yodkhunpon FightClub	Rajadamnern World Series - Final 4	Bangkok, Thailand	Decision (Unanimous)	3	3:00
2023-07-29	Win	(China) Liu Wen Jie	Rajadamnern World Series - Group Stage	Bangkok, Thailand	KO (Elbow)	2	
2023-06-24	Loss	(Iran) Sajad Sattari	Rajadamnern World Series - Group Stage	Bangkok, Thailand	Decision (Split)	3	3:00
2023-05-20	Win	(France) Morgan Adrar	Rajadamnern World Series - Group Stage	Bangkok, Thailand	TKO (Knee to the body)	1	1:35
2023-04-21	Win	(Russia) Aslanbek Zikreev	ONE Friday Fights 13, Lumpinee Stadium	Bangkok, Thailand	Decision (Split)	3	3:00
2023-02-24	Win	(Japan) Shingo Shibata	ONE Friday Fights 6, Lumpinee Stadium	Bangkok, Thailand	Decision (Unanimous)	3	3:00
2022-11-18	Loss	(Thailand) Rangkhao Wor.Sangprapai	Ruamponkon + Prachin	Prachinburi province, Thailand	KO (Elbows)	2	
2022-10-01	Win	(Thailand) Siwakorn Kiatcharoenchai	Muay Thai Vithee TinThai + Kiatpetch	Buriram province, Thailand	Decision	5	3:00
2022-08-13	Loss	(Thailand) Tapaokaew Singmawynn	Ruamponkon Samui, Petchbuncha Stadium	Ko Samui, Thailand	Decision	5	3:00
2022-04-16	Loss	(Thailand) Siwakorn Kiatjaroenchai	Sor.Sommai + Pitaktham	Phayao province, Thailand	KO (Punches)	2	
2022-02-19	Loss	(Thailand) Petchthongchai T.B.M Gym	SuekJaoMuayThai, Siam Omnoi Stadium - Isuzu Cup Final	Samut Sakhon, Thailand	Decision	5	3:00
For the 31st Isuzu Cup title.
2021-04-03	Win	(Thailand) Extra Rongsamak-OrBorJor.Udon	SuekJaoMuayThai, Siam Omnoi Stadium - Isuzu Cup Semi Final	Samut Sakhon, Thailand	Decision	5	3:00
2021-02-13	Win	(Thailand) Petchthongchai T.B.M Gym	SuekJaoMuayThai, Siam Omnoi Stadium - Isuzu Cup	Samut Sakhon, Thailand	Decision	5	3:00
2020-11-28	Win	(Thailand) Traithep Por.Telakun	SuekJaoMuayThai, Siam Omnoi Stadium - Isuzu Cup	Samut Sakhon, Thailand	TKO	5	
2020-10-24	Loss	(Thailand) Yod-IQ P.K.Saenchaimuaythaigym	SuekJaoMuayThai, Siam Omnoi Stadium - Isuzu Cup	Samut Sakhon, Thailand	Decision	5	3:00
2020-08-27	Win	(Thailand) ET Tded99	Petchwittaya, Rajadamnern Stadium	Bangkok, Thailand	Decision	5	3:00
2020-07-19	Win	(Thailand) Phetmanee Jitmuangnon	Muaydee VitheeThai, Blue Arena	Samut Prakan, Thailand	Decision	5	3:00
2020-03-11	Loss	(Thailand) Thanupetch Wor.Sangprapai	Petchwittaya, Rajadamnern Stadium	Bangkok, Thailand	Decision	5	3:00
2020-02-06	Win	(Thailand) Thanupetch Wor.Sangprapai	Petchwittaya, Rajadamnern Stadium	Bangkok, Thailand	Decision	5	3:00
2020-01-13	Loss	(Thailand) Luknimit Singklongsi	Petchwittaya, Rajadamnern Stadium	Bangkok, Thailand	Decision	5	3:00
2019-12-12	Loss	(Thailand) Luknimit Singklongsi	OneSongchai, Rajadamnern Stadium	Bangkok, Thailand	Decision	5	3:00
2019-10-23	Win	(Thailand) DetchChaiya Petchyindeeacademy	Petchwittaya, Rajadamnern Stadium	Bangkok, Thailand	Decision	5	3:00
2019-09-25	Draw	(Thailand) Samingdam Chor.Ajalaboon	Petchwittaya, Rajadamnern Stadium	Bangkok, Thailand	Decision	5	3:00
2019-08-28	Win	(Thailand) Kongmuangtrang Kaewsamrit	Petchwittaya, Rajadamnern Stadium	Bangkok, Thailand	Decision	5	3:00
2019-07-22	Loss	(Thailand) Kumandoi Petcharoenvit	Petchwittaya, Rajadamnern Stadium	Bangkok, Thailand	Decision	5	3:00
2019-05-26	Win	(Thailand) Achanai Petchyindeeacademy	Muaydee VitheeThai, Blue Arena	Samut Prakan, Thailand	Decision	5	3:00
2019-04-03	Win	(Thailand) SingUdon Or.UdUdon	Petchwittaya, Rajadamnern Stadium	Bangkok, Thailand	Decision	5	3:00
2019-02-28	Win	(Thailand) Petchprab Chutangduang	PetchChaoPhraya, Rajadamnern Stadium	Bangkok, Thailand	Decision	5	3:00
2019-02-02	Win	(Thailand) Priewpak SorJor.Vichitmuangpadriew	SuekJaoMuayThai, Omnoi Stadium	Bangkok, Thailand	Decision	5	3:00
2019-01-02	Loss	(Thailand) Chanalert Meenayothin	Petchwittaya, Rajadamnern Stadium	Bangkok, Thailand	Decision	5	3:00
2018-12-09	Loss	(Japan) Nadaka Yoshinari	"BOM XX The Battle Of Muay Thai 20"	Yokohama, Japan	Decision (Unanimous)	5	3:00
Loses the Rajadamnern Stadium Mini Flyweight (105 lbs) title.
2018-10-31	Win	(Thailand) Sakaengam Jitmuangnon	Petchwittaya, Rajadamnern Stadium	Bangkok, Thailand	Decision	5	3:00
2018-10-31	Loss	(Thailand) Petchanuwat Nor.AnuwatGym	Petchwittaya, Rajadamnern Stadium	Bangkok, Thailand	Decision	5	3:00
2018-07-26	Win	(Thailand) Ittipon Lookkhlongtan	OneSongchai, Rajadamnern Stadium	Bangkok, Thailand	Decision	5	3:00
Wins the vacant Rajadamnern Stadium Mini Flyweight (105 lbs) title.
2018-06-05	Win	(Thailand) Samuenthep Por Petchsiri	Lumpinee champion Kruekrai, Lumpinee Stadium	Bangkok, Thailand	Decision	5	3:00
Wins the vacant Lumpinee Stadium Mini Flyweight (105 lbs) title.
2018-05-02	Win	(Thailand) Samuenthep Por Petchsiri	Petchwittaya, Rajadamnern Stadium	Bangkok, Thailand	Decision	5	3:00
2018-03-23	Loss	(Thailand) Yodpetch EmyMuayThaiGym	Khunsuektrakoonyang, Lumpinee Stadium	Bangkok, Thailand	Decision	5	3:00
2018-02-01	Win	(Thailand) Palangpop Por.Muangpetch	OneSongchai, Rajadamnern Stadium	Bangkok, Thailand	KO	4	
2018-01-11	Win	(Thailand) Ittipon Lookkhlongtan	Petchwittaya, Rajadamnern Stadium	Bangkok, Thailand	Decision	5	3:00
2017-12-07	Draw	(Thailand) Ittipon Lookkhlongtan	OneSongchai, Rajadamnern Stadium	Bangkok, Thailand	Decision	5	3:00
2017-11-08	Win	(Thailand) Theplikit Sitajarnchao	Petchwittaya, Rajadamnern Stadium	Bangkok, Thailand	Decision	5	3:00
Legend: Win Loss Draw/No contest Notes

Amateur Muay Thai Record
Date	Result	Opponent	Event	Location	Method	Round	Time
2022-06-03	Loss	(United Arab Emirates) Mohammed Mardi	IFMA World Championships 2022, Final	Abu Dhabi, United Arab Emirates	Decision (Unanimous)	3	3:00
Wins 2022 IFMA World Championships U-23 -67kg Silver Medal.
2022-06-01	Win	(Morocco) Rachid Hamza	IFMA World Championships 2022, Semi Finals	Abu Dhabi, United Arab Emirates	Decision (Unanimous)	3	3:00
2022-05-30	Win	(Kazakhstan) Nail Khaliullin	IFMA World Championships 2022, Quarter Finals	Abu Dhabi, United Arab Emirates	Decision	3	3:00
2022-05-28	Win	(Palestine) Yahia Hajeer	IFMA World Championships 2022, First Round	Abu Dhabi, United Arab Emirates	Decision (Unanimous)	3	3:00
Legend: Win Loss Draw/No contest Notes
