= Niall McGreevy =

Irish Muay Thai fighter

- Born: Belfast, Ireland
- Height: 188 cm (6 ft 2 in)
- Weight: 66.67 kg (147 lb; 10 st 7 lb)
- Division: Welterweight
- Style: Muay Thai
- Stance: Orthodox
- Fighting out of: Belfast, Ireland
- Team: Langka Muaythai

Kickboxing record
- Total: 29
- Wins: 23
- By knockout: 9
- Losses: 5
- By knockout: 1
- Draws: 1

Niall McGreevy is an Irish Muay-Thai fighter. He is the current Rajadamnern Stadium Welterweight Champion and a former WBC Muay Thai Welterweight World champion.

== Career ==
McGreevy faced Detchrit Sitsonpeenong for the vacant WBC Muay Thai Welterweight championship. He won by decision after 5 rounds in Verona, Italy, to win the title.

McGreevy faced Arjan Hajdari for his first WBC title defence. He won by unanimous decision after 5 rounds in Glasgow, to defend his title.

On 11 July 2026, McGreevy challenged Tapaokaew Singha Mawynn for his Rajadamnern Stadium Welterweight title. He won the fight by second-round knockout with an elbow strike.

== Titles and accomplishments ==
- Rajadamnern Stadium
  - 2026 Rajadamnern Stadium Welterweight (147 lbs) Champion
- World Boxing Council
  - 2024 WBC Muay Thai International Welterweight Champion
  - 2024 WBC Muay Thai World Welterweight Champion
    - One successful title defense
- Lion Fight
  - 2021 Lion Fight European Super Welterweight Title

== Fight record ==
Professional Muay Thai and Kickboxing Record
24 Wins (9 (T)KO's), 5 Losses, 1 Draws
Date	Result	Opponent	Event	Location	Method	Round	Time
2026-07-11	Win	(Thailand) Tapaokaew Singha Mawynn	Rajadamnern World Series	Bangkok, Thailand	KO (Elbow)	2	1:20
Wins the Rajadamnern Stadium Welterweight (147 lbs) title.
2026-05-23	Win	(Thailand) Chujaroen Dabransarakarm	Rajadamnern World Series	Bangkok, Thailand	Decision (Unanimous)	3	3:00
2026-01-31	Win	(Turkey) Erdem Dincer	Rajadamnern World Series 179	Bangkok, Thailand	Decision (Unanimous)		
2025-09-20	Win	(Germany) Arjan Hajdari	Hungryside Super Show 2	Glasgow, United Kingdom	Decision (Unanimous)	5	3:00
Defends the WBC Muay Thai World Welterweight Championship.
2025-07-26	Win	(Thailand) Peemai Por Kobkuea	Rajadamnern World Series 152	Bangkok, Thailand	KO (Elbow)	1	1:20
2024-10-12	Win	(Thailand) Detchrit Sitsonpeenong	Amazing MuayThai Fight Night	Verona, Italy	Decision	5	3:00
Wins the vacant WBC Muay Thai World Welterweight Championship.
2024-05-04	Win	(Switzerland) Hakim Bah	Deliverance Muay Thai 3	Belfast, Ireland	Decision (Unanimous)	5	3:00
Wins the WBC Muay Thai International Welterweight Championship.
2024-02-24	Loss	(Spain) Marc Dass Rey	SENSHI 20	Varna, Bulgaria	Decision (Unanimous)	3	3:00
2023-10-28	Win	(France) Alexis Laugeois	MTFL 6.0	Gothenburg, Sweden	Decision (Unanimous)	5	3:00
2023-09-30	Win	(Sweden) Jonathan Larsson	Deliverance Muay Thai	Belfast, Ireland	TKO (Knees and elbows)	3	
2023-04-15	Win	(Spain) Victor Conesa	Deliverance Muay Thai	Belfast, Ireland	TKO (retirement)	3	
2023-02-18	Win	(France) Joannes Biard	Siam Warriors Super Fights	Cork, Ireland	KO (Elbow)	2	
2022-12-10	Win	(United Kingdom) Luke Bar	Victory 10	Newcastle upon Tyne, England	KO (Knee)	1	2:00
2022-08-20	Win	(United Kingdom) Luke Bar	Victory 9	Newcastle upon Tyne, England	Decision (Unanimous)	5	3:00
2022-04-23	Win	(United Kingdom) Jack Cooper	Victory 8	United Kingdom	TKO (Knees)	4	
2021-10-23	Win	(Canada) Jake Peacock	Lion Fight 71	Maidenhead, England	Decision (Unanimous)	5	3:00
Wins the Lion Fight European Super Welterweight Title
2021-09-18	Win	(Italy) Santino DiNardo	Deliverance Muay Thai		Decision		3:00
2021-05-18	Loss	(United Kingdom) Liam McGrandles	Victory 6		Decision		3:00
2019-10-26	Loss	(United Kingdom) Josh Hill	Yokkao 43		Decision		3:00
2019-09-21	Win	(United Kingdom) Junior Coleman	Deliverance Muay Thai		Decision		3:00
2018-06-23	Win	(Republic of Ireland) Michael O'Donovan	The Takeover		TKO	2	
2018-03-24	Win	(Republic of Ireland) Kevin Kavanagh	Deliverance Muay Thai		Decision		3:00
2017-11-18	Loss	(Republic of Ireland) Cian Hurley	Curadh Legends 2		Decision		3:00
2017-07-18	Win	(Republic of Ireland) Alan McCormack	Capital 1		TKO	1	
2017-05-06	Win	(Republic of Ireland) Fares Faroo	Deliverance Muay Thai		Decision		3:00
2017-02-18	Loss	(Republic of Ireland) Mark McGahey	Cage Kings		TKO	1	
2016-11-06	Win	(Republic of Ireland) Darren McFall	The Takeover		Decision		3:00
2016-10-01	Win	(Republic of Ireland) Mark McGahey	Deliverance Muay Thai		Decision		3:00
2016-07-30	Win	(Republic of Ireland) Belal Ahmad	The New Bloods 4		Decision		3:00
2016-07-23	Draw	(Republic of Ireland) Eoin Kelly	Nak Muay Fight Night 1		Decision		3:00
