= ONE 171 =

Combat sport events in 2025

ONE 171: Qatar
- The poster for ONE 171: Qatar
- Promotion: ONE Championship
- Date: February 20, 2025
- Venue: Lusail Sports Arena
- City: Lusail, Qatar

Event chronology
| ONE Friday Fights 97: Kongsuk vs. Lamnamoonlek | ONE 171: Qatar | ONE Friday Fights 98: Chartpayak vs. Kongchai |

ONE 171: Qatar was a combat sports event produced by ONE Championship that took place on February 20, 2025, at Lusail Sports Arena in Lusail, Qatar.

== Background ==
The event marked the promotion's second visit to Qatar and first since the country's much anticipated debut at ONE 166 in March 2024.

A ONE Strawweight World Championship unification bout and trilogy between current champion Joshua Pacio and former champion (also a current interim champion) Jarred Brooks was scheduled to serve as the co-main event, but was elevated as the event's headliner. The pairing previously met at ONE 164, where Brooks captured the title by unanimous decision. The second time met at ONE 166 in March 2024, which Pacio capture back the title by disqualification.

A ONE Bantamweight Kickboxing World Championship bout between current champion Jonathan Haggerty (also former ONE Bantamweight and Flyweight Muay Thai World Champion) and former K-1 Lightweight Champion Wei Rui was originally scheduled to headline the event, but the bout was shifted to the co-main event instead.

A featherweight bout between former ONE Featherweight and Lightweight Champion Martin Nguyen and Shamil Gasanov took place at the event. The pair was previously scheduled to meet at ONE Fight Night 7 in February 2023, but Gasanov was forced to withdraw due to an infection that stemmed from an injury.

Zayed Alkatheeri and Jarrah Alhazza were reported to scheduled at this event in a flyweight submission grappling bout. However, Alhazza was pulled out from the event and was replaced by Mohammad Hilal Ahmad Abu Rumuh in a openweight bout.

A bantamweight kickboxing bout between former ONE kickboxing world champions Petchtanong Petchfergus and Ilias Ennahachi was scheduled at this event. However, due to Ennahachi missed weight, he withdrew from the event and the bout was cancelled.

== Results ==
Fight card (YouTube / Watch ONE)
| Weight class | | | | Method | Round | Time | Notes |
|---|---|---|---|---|---|---|---|
| Strawweight | Joshua Pacio (c) | def. | Jarred Brooks (ic) | TKO (punches) | 2 | 4:22 | (Note: For the ONE Strawweight World Championship.) |
| Bantamweight Kickboxing | Jonathan Haggerty (c) | def. | Wei Rui | Decision (unanimous) | 5 | 3:00 | (Note: For the ONE Bantamweight Kickboxing World Championship.) |
| Welterweight | Roberto Soldić | def. | Saygid Guseyn Arslanaliev | KO (punch) | 1 | 1:55 |
| Catchweight (210 lbs) | Shamil Erdogan | def. | Aung La Nsang | KO (head kick) | 1 | 0:28 | (Note: Aung La missed weight (210 lb).) |
| Featherweight | Shamil Gasanov | def. | Martin Nguyen | Decision (unanimous) | 3 | 5:00 |
| Bantamweight | Bibiano Fernandes | def. | Kevin Belingon | Decision (split) | 3 | 5:00 |
| Heavyweight | Kirill Grishenko | def. | Mauro Cerilli | TKO (leg kick) | 1 | 3:28 |
| Bantamweight Muay Thai | Jake Peacock | def. | Shinji Suzuki | TKO (punches) | 3 | 1:29 |
| Women's Atomweight | Ayaka Miura | def. | Ritu Phogat | Submission (kneebar) | 1 | 2:24 |
| Catchweight (175 lbs) | Kade Ruotolo | def. | Nicolas Alejandro Vigna | Submission (arm-triangle choke) | 1 | 3:04 | (Note: Vigna missed weight (175 lb).) |
Preliminary card (Only in Stadium)
| Openweight Submission Grappling | Zayed Alkatheeri | def. | Mohammed Aburumuh | Submission (armbar) | 1 | 2:21 |
| Lightweight | Abdullo Khodzhaev | def. | Wilian Poles | TKO (punches) | 1 | 4:56 |
| Featherweight | Hussein Salem | def. | Walter Cogliandro | KO (punch) | 1 | 2:25 |

== Bonus awards ==
The following fighters received $50,000 bonuses:

- Performance of the Night: Joshua Pacio, Roberto Soldić, Shamil Edrogan, Ayaka Miura and Kade Ruotolo

== See also ==
- 2025 in ONE Championship
- List of ONE Championship events
- List of current ONE fighters
- ONE Championship Rankings
