= ONE Fight Night 26 =

Combat sport events in 2024

ONE Fight Night 26: Lee vs. Rasulov
- The poster for ONE Fight Night 26: Lee vs. Rasulov
- Promotion: ONE Championship
- Date: December 7, 2024
- Venue: Lumpinee Boxing Stadium
- City: Bangkok, Thailand

Event chronology
ONE Friday Fights 90: Kongklai vs. Kacem	ONE Fight Night 26: Lee vs. Rasulov	ONE Friday Fights 91: Komawut vs. Balyko

ONE Fight Night 26: Lee vs. Rasulov was a combat sports event produced by ONE Championship that took place on December 7, 2024, at Lumpinee Boxing Stadium in Bangkok, Thailand.

== Background ==
A ONE Lightweight World Championship bout between current champion (also the ONE Welterweight Champion and ONE Lightweight World Grand Prix winner) Christian Lee and Alibeg Rasulov headlined the event. The bout was originally scheduled for ONE 169, but was moved to this event for unknown reasons.

A ONE Women's Atomweight Submission Grappling World Championship rematch between current champion (also multiple-time IBJJF World Champion) Mayssa Bastos and former champion Danielle Kelly took place at the event. They previously met at ONE Fight Night 24 in August 2024, where Bastos won the title by unanimous decision.

Cole Abate made his promotional debut against former two-time ONE Lightweight World Champion Shinya Aoki in a lightweight submission grappling match at the event.

Diego Paez was expected to make his promotional debut against Nakrob Fairtex in a flyweight muay thai bout. However, Paez withdrew due to injury and was replaced by Kongthoranee Sor.Sommai.

At the weigh-ins, former ONE Bantamweight Kickboxing World Champion Petchtanong Petchfergus failed hydration and missed weight for his bantamweight kickboxing bout against Nabil Anane and the bout was cancelled when Petchtanong was hospitalized and required IV drips. Denis Purić and Elias Mahmoudi were missed weight over the flyweight limit and the bout met in a catchweight bout at 138.75 pounds.

== Results ==
Fight card (Amazon Prime Video)
Weight class				Method	Round	Time	Notes
Lightweight	Christian Lee (c)	vs.	Alibeg Rasulov	No Contest (accidental eye poke)	2	4:55	(Note: For the ONE Lightweight World Championship. Accidental eye poke rendered Rasulov unable to continue.)
Flyweight Muay Thai	Kongthoranee Sor.Sommai	def.	Nakrob Fairtex	Decision (unanimous)	3	3:00
Women's Atomweight Submission Grappling	Mayssa Bastos (c)	def.	Danielle Kelly	Decision (unanimous)	1	10:00	(Note: For the ONE Women's Atomweight Submission Grappling World Championship.)
Flyweight	Reece McLaren	def.	Jarred Brooks	Decision (split)	3	5:00
Flyweight Muay Thai	Elias Mahmoudi	vs.	Denis Purić	No Contest (overturned)	3	2:58	(Note: Both fighter missed weight: Mahmoudi (138.75 lb) and Purić (138 lb). Originally a KO (knees to the body and punches) win for Mahmoudi; overturned after he tested positive for meldonium.)
Flyweight	Yuya Wakamatsu	def.	Gilbert Nakatani	Decision (unanimous)	3	5:00
Featherweight	Shamil Gasanov	def.	Halil Amir	Decision (unanimous)	3	5:00
Lightweight Submission Grappling	Cole Abate	def.	Shinya Aoki	Submission (heel hook)	1	2:25
Strawweight Kickboxing	Jonathan Di Bella	def.	Rui Botelho	Decision (unanimous)	3	3:00
Lightweight Submission Grappling	Dante Leon	def.	Bruno Pucci	Submission (triangle armbar)	1	2:01
Strawweight Muay Thai	Thongpoon P.K.Saenchai	def.	Danial Williams	TKO (punches)	2	1:10

== Bonus awards ==
The following fighters received $50,000 bonuses.

- Performance of the Night: Cole Abate, Dante Leon and Thongpoon P.K.Saenchai

== See also ==
- 2024 in ONE Championship
- List of ONE Championship events
- List of current ONE fighters
- ONE Championship Rankings
