= ONE Fight Night 29 =

Combat sport events in 2025

ONE Fight Night 29: Rodrigues vs. McManamon
- The poster for ONE Fight Night 29: Rodrigues vs. McManamon
- Promotion: ONE Championship
- Date: March 8, 2025
- Venue: Lumpinee Boxing Stadium
- City: Bangkok, Thailand

Event chronology
ONE Friday Fights 99: Yod-IQ vs. Morari	ONE Fight Night 29: Rodrigues vs. McManamon	ONE Friday Fights 100: Muangthai vs. Abdulmedzhidov

ONE Fight Night 29: Rodrigues vs. McManamon was a combat sports event produced by ONE Championship that took place on March 8, 2025, at Lumpinee Boxing Stadium in Bangkok, Thailand.

== Background ==
A ONE Women's Atomweight Muay Thai World Championship bout between current champion Allycia Rodrigues and Shir Cohen was scheduled to headline the event. However, Cohen withdrew due to suffered as injury and was replaced by promotional newcomer Marie McManamon.

At the weigh-ins, three fighters failed to hydration test and missed weight:

- Parham Gheirati came in at 147.25 pounds, 2.25 pounds over the bantamweight limit and he was fined 30% of purse, which went to Rambolek Chor.Ajalaboon.
- Soe Lin Oo weighed in at 147.25 pounds, 2.25 pounds over the bantamweight limit and he was fined 20% of purse, which went to Dmitrii Kovtun.
- Diogo Reis weighed in at 139.75 pounds, 4.75 pounds over the flyweight limit and he was fined 40%, which went to Shoya Ishiguro.

== Results ==
Fight card (Amazon Prime Video)
Weight class				Method	Round	Time	Notes
Women's Atomweight Muay Thai	Allycia Rodrigues (c)	def.	Marie McManamon	TKO (doctor stoppage)	4	3:00	(Note: For the ONE Women's Atomweight Muay Thai World Championship.)
Bantamweight Muay Thai	Rambolek Chor.Ajalaboon	def.	Parham Gheirati	TKO (punch)	2	1:15	(Note: Gheirati missed weight (147.25 lb).)
Bantamweight Muay Thai	Dmitrii Kovtun	def.	Soe Lin Oo	Decision (unanimous)	3	3:00	(Note: Soe missed weight (147.25 lb).)
Light Heavyweight	Shamil Erdogan	def.	Gilberto Galvão	TKO (knee and punches)	1	0:41
Bantamweight	Enkh-Orgil Baatarkhuu	def.	Jeremy Pacatiw	Decision (unanimous)	3	5:00
Women's Atomweight Muay Thai	Martyna Kierczyńska	def.	Yu Yau Pui	Decision (split)	3	3:00
Catchweight (140 lbs)	Sanzhar Zakirov	def.	Eko Roni Saputra	KO (punches)	2	1:46
Featherweight Muay Thai	Nonthachai Jitmuangnon	def.	Arian Esparza	Decision (unanimous)	3	3:00
Flyweight	Banma Duoji	vs.	Joshua Pereira	NC (overturned)	1	2:13	(Note: Originally a TKO (knee injury) win for Banma; overturned after he tested positive for furosemide.)
Flyweight Submission Grappling	Diogo Reis	def.	Shoya Ishiguro	Submission (kimura)	1	6:05	(Note: Reis missed weight (139.5 lb).)
Catchweight (148 lbs) Muay Thai	István Ștefan Kóródi	def.	Katsuki Kitano	Decision (unanimous)	3	3:00

== Bonus awards ==
The following fighters received $50,000 bonuses:

- Performance of the Night: Allycia Rodrigues, Rambolek Chor.Ajalaboon and Shamil Erdogan

== See also ==
- 2025 in ONE Championship
- List of ONE Championship events
- List of current ONE fighters
- ONE Championship Rankings
