= Rambolek Chor.Ajalaboon =

Thai Muay Thai fighter

Rambolek
- Born: Wuttichai Khaihin; March 14, 2003 (age 23); Chaiyaphum province, Thailand
- Other names: Rambolek Tor.Yotha (แรมโบ้เล็ก ต.โยธา); Rambolek Wor.Jakrawut (แรมโบ้เล็ก ว.จักรวุฒิ); Rambolek Sor.Tor.Watcharin (แรมโบ้เล็ก ส.ท.วัชรินทร์)
- Height: 173 cm (5 ft 8 in)
- Weight: 65 kg (143 lb; 10.2 st)
- Stance: Orthodox
- Fighting out of: Bangkok, Thailand
- Team: Kiatpetch; Superbon Training Center

Wuttichai Khaihin (Thai: วุฒิชัย ไข่หิน; born March 14, 2003), known professionally as Rambolek Chor.Ajalaboon (Thai: แรมโบ้เล็ก ฉ.อจลบุญ) is a Thai Muay Thai fighter. He currently competes in ONE Championship, where he is the former ONE Bantamweight Muay Thai World Champion. As of September 22, 2026, he is ranked #1 in the ONE Bantamweight Muay Thai rankings.

== Biography and career ==
=== Early career ===
Rambolek started training in Muay Thai at the age of 7 in his native Chaiyaphum province.

On March 7, 2021, Rambolek faced Nontachai Jitmuangnon on the MuayDee WIthiThai promotion at the Or.Tor.Gor3 Stadium. He won the fight by decision.

On April 25, 2021, Rambolek defeated Babak Haghi by decision at THAI FIGHT DMHTT.

Rambolek faced Alessandro Sara at THAI FIGHT Strong on July 4, 2021. He lost the fight by decision.

On May 1, 2022, Rambolek faced Yod-ET PTT Thongthawee for the vacant Channel 7 Stadium 140 lbs title. He won the fight by decision.

Rambolek was scheduled to face Siwakorn Kiatcharoenchai at the Channel 7 Stadium on July 7, 2022. The fight ended in a draw after five rounds.

On October 1, 2022, Rambolek faced Kongklai AnnyMuayThai on Muay Thai Vithee TinThai + Kiatpetch in the Buriram province. He won the fight by decision.

On August 13, 2022, Rambolek defeated Kulabdam Sor.Jor.Piek-U-Thai by decision at the Petchbuncha Stadium.

=== ONE Championship ===
Rambolek made his ONE Championship debut at ONE Friday Fights 22 on June 23, 2023, against Theeradet Chor.Hapayak. He won the fight by second-round knockout.

On April 21, 2023, Rambolek faced Zhang Chenglong at ONE Friday Fights 13. He won the fight by second-round technical knockout. After this victory Rambolek received a ONE Championship multi fight contract worth $100,000.

Rambolek faced Fariyar Aminipour at ONE Friday Fights 22 on June 23, 2023. He lost the bout by split decision.

On February 9, 2024, Rambolek faced Soner Sen at ONE Friday Fights 51. He won the fight by unanimous decision.

On March 8, 2025, Rambolek defeated Parham Gheirati by second-round technical knockout at ONE Fight Night 29. He received a $50,000 performance bonus for this win.

On January 24, 2026, Rambolek faced Abdulla Dayakaev at ONE Fight Night 39. He won the fight by second-round knockout, a victory that earned him a performance bonus.

Rambolek was scheduled to challenge Nabil Anane for his ONE Bantamweight (145 lbs) Muay Thai World title on March 20, 2026, at ONE Friday Fights 147. He won the fight by unanimous decision after scoring two knockdowns.

Rambolek was scheduled to defend his ONE Championship Muay Thai Bantamweight world title at ONE Friday Fights 170 & The Inner Circle 30 against Yod-IQ Or.Pimolsri on September 11, 2026. Rambolek missed weight and was stripped of the title.

== Titles and accomplishments ==
- ONE Championship
  - 2026 ONE Championship Muay Thai Bantamweight (145 lbs) World Champion (former)
  - Performance of the Night
    - (Four times) vs. Theeradet Chor.Hapayak, Zhang Chenglong, Parham Gheirati, Abdulla Dayakaev
- Channel 7 Stadium
  - 2022 Channel 7 Stadium 140 lbs Champion

== Fight record ==
Muay Thai Record
| Date | Result | Opponent | Event | Location | Method | Round | Time |
|---|---|---|---|---|---|---|---|
| 2026-09-11 | Loss | (Thailand) Yod-IQ Or.Pimolsri | ONE Friday Fights 170 & The Inner Circle 30 | Bangkok, Thailand | Decision (Unanimous) | 5 | 3:00 |
Rambolek missed weight and was stripped of the ONE Championship Muay Thai Bantamweight (145 lbs) World title.
| 2026-03-20 | Win | (Thailand) Nabil Anane | ONE Friday Fights 147 | Bangkok, Thailand | Decision (Unanimous) | 5 | 3:00 |
Wins the ONE Championship Muay Thai Bantamweight (145 lbs) World title.
| 2026-01-24 | Win | (Russia) Abdulla Dayakaev | ONE Fight Night 39 | Bangkok, Thailand | KO (Punch to the body) | 2 | 2:41 |
| 2025-09-06 | Win | (Russia) Dmitrii Kovtun | ONE Fight Night 35 | Bangkok, Thailand | KO (Punch to the head) | 2 | 2:01 |
| 2025-03-08 | Win | (Iran) Parham Gheirati | ONE Fight Night 29 | Bangkok, Thailand | TKO (Punches) | 2 | 1:15 |
| 2024-08-03 | Win | (Republic of Ireland) Craig Coakley | ONE Fight Night 24 | Bangkok, Thailand | Decision (Unanimous) | 3 | 3:00 |
| 2024-02-09 | Win | (Turkey) Soner Sen | ONE Friday Fights 51, Lumpinee Stadium | Bangkok, Thailand | Decision (Unanimous) | 3 | 3:00 |
| 2023-09-29 | Loss | (United States) Asa Ten Pow | ONE Fight Night 14 | Kallang, Singapore | KO (Right cross + headkick) | 3 | 0:25 |
| 2023-06-23 | Loss | (Iran) Fariyar Aminipour | ONE Friday Fights 22, Lumpinee Stadium | Bangkok, Thailand | Decision (Split) | 3 | 3:00 |
| 2023-04-21 | Win | (China) Zhang Chenglong | ONE Friday Fights 13 | Bangkok, Thailand | TKO (Punches) | 2 | 1:32 |
| 2023-03-03 | Win | (Thailand) Theeradet Chor.Hapayak | ONE Friday Fights 7, Lumpinee Stadium | Bangkok, Thailand | KO (Right hook) | 2 | 0:10 |
| 2023-01-07 | Win | (Thailand) Kongklai AnnyMuayThai | Ruamponkon Samui: Samui Super Fight, Phetchbuncha Stadium | Ko Samui, Thailand | Decision | 5 | 3:00 |
| 2022-12-10 | Win | (Thailand) Darky Nokkhao KM.11 | Ruamponkon Samui, Petchbuncha Stadium | Ko Samui, Thailand | Decision | 5 | 3:00 |
| 2022-10-01 | Loss | (Thailand) Kongklai AnnyMuayThai | Muay Thai Vithee TinThai + Kiatpetch | Buriram province, Thailand | Decision | 5 | 3:00 |
| 2022-08-13 | Win | (Thailand) Kulabdam Sor.Jor.Piek-U-Thai | Ruamponkon Samui, Petchbuncha Stadium | Ko Samui, Thailand | Decision | 5 | 3:00 |
| 2022-07-10 | Draw | (Thailand) Siwakorn Kiatcharoenchai | Channel 7 Stadium | Bangkok, Thailand | Decision | 5 | 3:00 |
| 2022-05-01 | Win | (Thailand) Yod-ET PTT Thongthawee | Channel 7 Stadium | Bangkok, Thailand | Decision | 5 | 3:00 |
Wins the vacant Channel 7 Stadium 140 lbs title.
| 2022-03-13 | Win | (Thailand) Thanonchai Fairtex | Channel 7 Stadium | Bangkok, Thailand | Decision | 5 | 3:00 |
| 2022-01-23 | Loss | (Thailand) PhetUtong Or.Kwanmuang | Channel 7 Stadium | Bangkok, Thailand | Decision | 5 | 3:00 |
| 2021-12-26 | Win | (Thailand) Panpayak Sitchefboontham | Channel 7 Stadium | Bangkok, Thailand | Decision | 5 | 3:00 |
| 2021-11-14 | Win | (Thailand) Duangsompong Jitmuangnon | MuayDee WIthiThai, Or.Tor.Gor3 Stadium | Nonthaburi province, Thailand | Decision | 5 | 3:00 |
| 2021-07-04 | Loss | (Italy) Alessandro Sara | THAI FIGHT Strong | Pattaya, Thailand | Decision | 3 | 3:00 |
| 2021-04-25 | Win | (Iran) Babak Haghi | THAI FIGHT DMHTT | Samut Sakhon, Thailand | TKO (Punches) | 1 | |
| 2021-03-07 | Win | (Thailand) Nontachai Jitmuangnon | MuayDee WIthiThai, Or.Tor.Gor3 Stadium | Nonthaburi province, Thailand | Decision | 5 | 3:00 |
| 2020-12-13 | Win | (Italy) Alessandro Sara | Muaydeevitheethai, Blue Arena | Samut Prakan, Thailand | Decision | 5 | 3:00 |
| 2020-10-25 | Loss | (Thailand) Petchmahachon Jitmuangnon | Muaydeevitheethai, Blue Arena | Samut Prakan, Thailand | Decision | 5 | 3:00 |
| 2020-10-04 | Win | (Thailand) Saenwangchai J.S.P. | Muaydeevitheethai, Blue Arena | Samut Prakan, Thailand | Decision | 5 | 3:00 |
| 2020-08-25 | Draw | (Thailand) Anulak Tded99 | Chefboontham, Thanakorn Boxing Stadium | Nakhon Pathom province, Thailand | Decision | 5 | 3:00 |
| 2020-07-18 | Win | (Thailand) Suaphet SinghodGym | OneSongchai, Thanakorn Boxing Stadium | Nakhon Pathom province, Thailand | Decision | 5 | 3:00 |
| 2020-03-08 | Win | (Thailand) Chandej Kor.Adisorn | Muaydeevitheethai, Blue Arena | Samut Prakan, Thailand | KO | 4 | |
Legend: Win Loss Draw/No contest Notes
