= Nabil Anane =

Thai and French Muay Thai fighter (born 2004)

Nabil Anane นาบิล อานาน
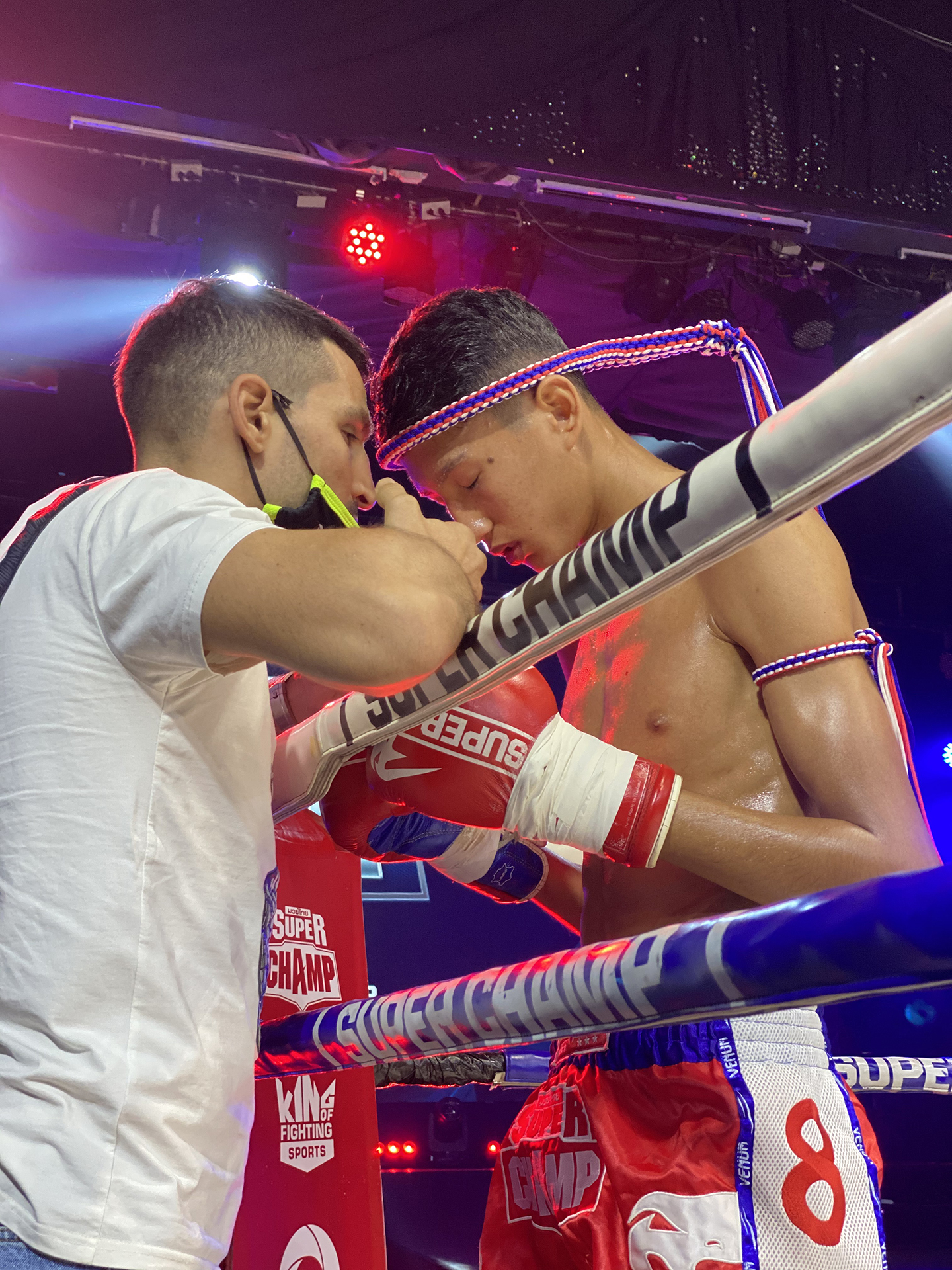
- Nabil in 2020
- Born: 30 April 2004 (age 22); Pattaya, Thailand
- Other names: Nabil Petchrungruang
- Citizenship: Thailand; France
- Height: 191 cm (6 ft 3 in)
- Division: Bantamweight
- Style: Muay Thai
- Team: Venum
- Trainer: Mehdi Zatout

Nabil Anane (Thai: นาบิล อานาน; born 30 April 2004) is a Thai and French Muay Thai fighter. He is a former IFMA youth world Muay Thai champion. He previously competed in Lethwei at the World Lethwei Championship and is signed to ONE Championship, where he is a former ONE Bantamweight Muay Thai World Champion. As of September 22, 2026, Anane is ranked #3 in the ONE Bantamweight Muay Thai rankings.

As of June 2025, the World Muay Thai Organization (WMO) lists him in their top 15 pound-for-pound fighter list. For the Welterweight division (147 lbs/66.678 kg), the WMTO currently ranks Nabil as the number one ranked welterweight.

== Background ==
Nabil was born on 30 April 2004 in Pattaya, Thailand, to a Thai mother and a French father of Algerian descent from Marseille. He holds dual citizenship: Thai and French.

He began training in martial arts at the age of 7, starting with Taekwondo and Karate. At the age of 11, he began training in Muay Thai at the Petchrungruang camp. He is currently under contract with Venum and has been training at the Venum camp in Pattaya under the supervision of Mehdi Zatout since the age of 14.

== Fighting career ==
=== Muay Thai ===
On 15 November 2020, he won against Dylan Thorpe by decision at Super Champ Muay Thai.

On 4 March 2021 after 5 rounds of hard fighting he won by decision against Wattana Sermphornwiwat at Rangsit Stadium.

On 26 March 2021, Nabil knocked out Dodo Lukkokruk by elbow in the second round at Rangsit Stadium.

Nabil faced the former Rajadamnern Stadium champion Samingdet Nor. Anuwatgym at the Rajadamnern Stadium on 24 March 2022. He won the fight by decision.

Nabil faced Petchnarin SatianMuayThai for the vacant WBC Muay Thai Featherweight World title on 14 May 2022, Venum Fight Rajadamnern Stadium event. He won the fight by a second-round knockout and became the youngest WBC Muay Thai Featherweight world champion ever.

Nabil faced Chorfah Tor.Sangtiennoi at Muaydee VitheeThai + Jitmuangnon event at the Or.Tor.Gor3 Stadium on 12 June 2022. He won the fight by decision.

In 2022, Nabil took part in the Rajadamnern World Series in the 126 lbs division. In his first group stage fight he defeated Thongnoi Lukbanyai by decision.

Nabil faced Superlek Kiatmuu9 on 23 June 2023, at ONE Friday Fights 22, losing the bout via body punch KO in the first round.

For the August 2024 rankings, Combat Press ranked Nabil Anane as the 9th best Muay Thai boxer in the welterweight division.

Nabil was scheduled to face Petchtanong Petchfergus in a kickboxing bout on 7 December 2024, at ONE Fight Night 26. However, the bout was cancelled when Petchtanong failed hydration and missed weight, resulting in Petchtanong being hospitalized and given IV drips.

On 27 September 2024, Nabil faced Burmese superstar Soe Lin Oo at ONE Friday Fights 81 inside Lumpinee Stadium and won the fight via decision.

Nabil was scheduled to face Kiamran Nabati on 24 January 2025, at ONE 170. However, Nabil was stepped to fight Nico Carrillo for the interim ONE Bantamweight Muay Thai World Championship bout after Superlek Kiatmuu9 withdrew due to serious knee injury. He won the fight via first round technical knockout and this win earned the $50,000 Performance of the Night bonus.

Nabil faced Superlek Kiatmuu9 in a rematch for the unification of ONE Bantamweight Muay Thai World Championship on 23 March 2025, at ONE 172. At the weigh-ins, Superlek failed the hydration test and came in at 146.25 pounds, 1.25 pounds over the bantamweight limit. As a results, Superlek was stripped of the title and the bout was switched to three-round non-title bout. Nabil won the fight via unanimous decision.

Anane was scheduled to defend his ONE Bantamweight (145 lbs) Muay Thai World title against Rambolek Chor.Ajalaboon on March 20, 2026, at ONE Friday Fights 147. He lost the fight via unanimous decision.

=== Lethwei ===
On 28 August 2020, Nabil was invited by the World Lethwei Championship to compete in Lethwei with no gloves and headbutts allowed against local fighter Sao Phoe Khwar and won by decision at WLC 12: Hideout Battle in Yangon.

== Titles and accomplishments ==
=== Professional ===
- ONE Championship
  - ONE Bantamweight Muay Thai World Champion (One time, former)
  - 2024: Ranked #2 Breakout Star of the Year
  - Interim ONE Bantamweight Muay Thai World Champion (One time, former)
- World Kickboxing Network
  - 2021 WKN Intercontinental Champion
- World Professional Muaythai Federation
  - 2018 WPMF -40 kg Champion
- World Boxing Council Muaythai
  - 2022 WBC Muay Thai Featherweight (126 lbs) World Champion
  - 2023 WBC Muay Thai Lightweight (135 lbs) World Champion

=== Amateur ===
- International Federation of Muaythai Associations
  - 2017 IFMA World Championships Youth (12-13 Years old) -38 kg (gold)

Awards

- 2024-25 Sports Writers Association of Thailand Modified Muay Thai Fighter of the Year
- 2025 Sports Authority of Thailand Non Traditional Muay Thai Fighter of the Year

== Fight record ==
Professional Muaythai record
42 Wins, 7 Losses, 1 Draw, 1 No Contest
Date	Result	Opponent	Event	Location	Method	Round	Time
2026-12-18		(Scotland) Nico Carrillo	ONE The Inner Circle 43	Bangkok, Thailand			
For the ONE Featherweight Muay Thai World Championship.
2026-10-17	Win	(Japan) Yuki Yoza	ONE Samurai 4	Tokyo, Japan	Decision (Unanimous)	3	3:00
2026-08-07	Loss	(Thailand) Suakim Pongsuphan PK	ONE: The Inner Circle 25	Bangkok, Thailand	Decision (Split)	3	3:00
2026-03-20	Loss	(Thailand) Rambolek Chor.Ajalaboon	ONE Friday Fights 147	Bangkok, Thailand	Decision (Unanimous)	5	3:00
Defending the ONE Bantamweight (145 lbs) Muay Thai World title.
2025-11-16	Win	(Japan) Hiromi Wajima	ONE 173	Tokyo, Japan	Decision (Unanimous)	3	3:00
2025-09-26	NC	(Morocco) Ilias Ennahachi	ONE Friday Fights 126, Lumpinee Stadium	Bangkok, Thailand	No contest (low blow)	3	0:23
2025-03-23	Win	(Thailand) Superlek Kiatmuu9	ONE 172	Saitama, Japan	Decision (Unanimous)	3	3:00
Superlek missed weight (146.25 lb) and was stripped of the ONE Bantamweight Muay Thai World Championship. The bout was switched to a three-round non-title fight.
2025-01-24	Win	(Scotland) Nico Carrillo	ONE 170	Bangkok, Thailand	TKO (3 Knockdowns)	1	2:35
Wins the interim ONE Bantamweight (145 lbs) Muay Thai World title.
2024-09-27	Win	(Myanmar) Soe Lin Oo	ONE Friday Fights 81, Lumpinee Stadium	Bangkok, Thailand	Decision (Unanimous)	3	3:00
2024-08-03	Win	(Brazil) Felipe Lobo	ONE Fight Night 24, Lumpinee Stadium	Bangkok, Thailand	Decision (Unanimous)	3	3:00
2024-07-05	Win	(Thailand) Kulabdam Sor.Jor.Piek-U-Thai	ONE Friday Fights 69, Lumpinee Stadium	Bangkok, Thailand	KO (Knee to the head)	2	2:54
2023-12-22	Win	(Thailand) Muangthai P.K. Saenchaimuaythaigym	ONE Friday Fights 46, Lumpinee Stadium	Bangkok, Thailand	Decision (Unanimous)	3	3:00
2023-09-08	Win	(Thailand) Nakrob Fairtex	ONE Friday Fights 32, Lumpinee Stadium	Bangkok, Thailand	KO (Right cross)	2	1:08
2023-06-23	Loss	(Thailand) Superlek Kiatmuu9	ONE Friday Fights 22, Lumpinee Stadium	Bangkok, Thailand	KO (Straight to the body)	1	2:03
2023-02-04	Win	(Italy) Luca Falco	Amazing Muay Thai Festival	Hua Hin, Thailand	Decision (Unanimous)	5	3:00
Wins the WBC Muaythai World Lightweight Title.
2022-12-23	Win	(Thailand) PetchEk Banraimonta	Rajadamnern World Series	Bangkok, Thailand	KO (Punches)	1	
2022-11-11	Draw	(Cambodia) Eh Amarin Phouthong	Rajadamnern World Series	Bangkok, Thailand	Decision (Unanimous)	3	3:00
2022-09-02	Win	(Iran) Amirhossein Kamary	Rajadamnern World Series	Bangkok, Thailand	Decision (Unanimous)	3	3:00
2022-07-29	Win	(Thailand) Thongnoi Lukbanyai	Rajadamnern World Series	Bangkok, Thailand	Decision (Unanimous)	3	3:00
2022-06-12	Win	(Thailand) Chorfah Tor.Sangtiennoi	Muaydee VitheeThai + Jitmuangnon, Or.Tor.Gor3 Stadium	Nonthaburi province, Thailand	Decision	5	3:00
2022-05-14	Win	(Thailand) Petchnarin SatianMuayThai	Venum Fight, Rajadamnern Stadium	Bangkok, Thailand	KO (Punches & knee)	2	2:40
Won the WBC Muaythai Featherweight World Title.
2022-03-24	Win	(Thailand) Samingdet Nor.Anuwatgym	Petchyindee, Rajadamnern Stadium	Bangkok, Thailand	Decision	5	3:00
2022-02-17	Loss	(Thailand) Chorfah Tor.Sangtiennoi	Petchyindee, Rajadamnern Stadium	Bangkok, Thailand	Decision	5	3:00
2021-12-10	Loss	(Thailand) Kiewpayak Jitmuangnon	Muaymanwsuk, Rangsit Stadium	Rangsit, Thailand	Decision	5	3:00
2021-11-19	Win	(Thailand) Artid Kawkaigym	MPRO EVOLUTION, World Siam Stadium	Bangkok, Thailand	TKO (Referee Stoppage)	2	
Wins WKN Intercontinental featherweight title.
2021-10-28	Win	(Thailand) Tayat Or.Prasert	Petchyindee + Muay Thai Moradok Kon Thai	Buriram province, Thailand	Decision	5	3:00
2021-03-26	Win	(Thailand) Dodo Lukkokruk	Rangsit Stadium	Rangsit, Thailand	Decision	5	3:00
2021-03-04	Win	(Thailand) Wattana Sermphornwiwat	Rangsit Stadium	Rangsit, Thailand	Decision	5	3:00
2020-11-15	Win	(Australia) Dylan Thorpe	Super Champ Muay Thai	Bangkok, Thailand	Decision	3	3:00
2020-10-16	Win	(Thailand) Numtone Rongirankratiamwitaya	True4u Muaymanwansuk, Rangsit Stadium	Rangsit, Thailand	KO (Knees & elbow)	4	
2019-10-14	Win	(Thailand) Lukbid Suhananpeekmai	Lumpinee Stadium	Bangkok, Thailand	KO (Right cross)	2	
2019	Win	(Thailand) Penthep Singpatong	Lumpinee Stadium	Bangkok, Thailand	Decision	5	3:00
2019-07-23	Win	(Thailand) Phetlela M.U.Den	Lumpinee Stadium	Bangkok, Thailand	KO	4	
2018-04-19	Win	(Thailand) Jutathep YodThanu MAF	Rajadamnern Stadium	Bangkok, Thailand	Decision	5	3:00
2018	Win	(Thailand) Lukkhaoka Sitnayoktaweetapong.	Bon arena stadium	Pattaya, Thailand	Decision	5	3:00
Wins Thailand east title.
2017-12-22	Loss	(Thailand) Yodkhunsuk Sitkruyiem	Magma Muay Thai	Rayong Province, Thailand	Decision	5	3:00
2017-11-20	Win	Thailand Kiatpantamit	Max Muay Thai	Bangkok, Thailand	Decision	3	3:00
2017	Win	(Thailand) N/A	Lumpinee Stadium	Bangkok, Thailand			
2017	Win	(Thailand) N/A	Venum	Thailand	TKO		
2017	Win	(Thailand) N/A	Max Muay Thai	Bangkok, Thailand	KO (Knees)		
2017	Loss	(Thailand) Kritchtong	Theparasit stadium	Pattaya, Thailand	Decision	5	3:00
2016	Win	(Thailand) Payaktamin Ormeekun	Theparasit stadium	Pattaya, Thailand	TKO	3	
2015	Win	(Thailand) Prakaipetch Sitpa O	Theparasit stadium	Pattaya, Thailand	TKO	4	
2015	Win	(Thailand) Padetnoi Sitorbortorserm	Theparasit stadium	Pattaya, Thailand	Decision	5	3:00
Legend: Win Loss Draw/No contest Notes

Amateur Muaythai record

Amateur Muaythai record
3 wins, 0 losses, 0 draws
Date	Result	Opponent	Event	Location	Method	Round	Time
2017-08-03	Win	Apihwat Manatphom	2017 IFMA Youth World Championship, Final	Bangkok, Thailand	Decision (30-27)	3	3:00
Wins IFMA Youth World Championships Gold Medal.
2017-08-03	Win	Oliver Hanson	2017 IFMA Youth World Championship, Semi Final	Bangkok, Thailand	Decision (30-27)	3	3:00
2017-08-03	Win	N/A	2017 IFMA Youth World Championship, Quarter Final	Bangkok, Thailand	Forfeit (0-0)	3	3:00
Legend: Win Loss Draw/No contest Notes

== Lethwei record ==
Professional Lethwei record
1 win, 0 losses, 0 draws
Date	Result	Opponent	Event	Location	Method	Round	Time
2020-08-28	Win	(Myanmar) Saw Phoe Khwar	WLC 12: Hideout Battle	Yangon, Myanmar	Decision	5	3:00
Legend: Win Loss Draw/No contest Notes

== See also ==
- Venum
- 2020 in World Lethwei Championship
