= ONE Fight Night 14 =

Combat sport events in 2023

ONE Fight Night 14: Stamp vs. Ham
- The poster for ONE Fight Night 14: Stamp vs. Ham
- Promotion: ONE Championship
- Date: September 30, 2023
- Venue: Singapore Indoor Stadium
- City: Kallang, Singapore

Event chronology
ONE Friday Fights 35: Kongsuk vs. Dedduanglek	ONE Fight Night 14: Stamp vs. Ham	ONE Friday Fights 36: Superball vs. Lobo

ONE Fight Night 14: Stamp vs. Ham was a combat sport event produced by ONE Championship that took place on September 30, 2023, at the Singapore Indoor Stadium in Kallang, Singapore.

== Background ==
The event marked the promotion's return to Kallang, Singapore and first since ONE Fight Night 8 in March 2023.

An interim ONE Women's Atomweight World Championship bout between former ONE Women's Atomweight Muay Thai and Kickboxing Champion Stamp Fairtex and former Rizin Women's Super Atomweight champion Ham Seo-hee headlined the event. The fight then took place for the undisputed title, due to then champion Angela Lee announcing her retirement and vacating the title during the event.

A rematch for the ONE Women's Strawweight Muay thai World Championship between current champion Smilla Sundell and Jackie Buntan was expected to take place at the event. The pair previously faced each other in April 2022 at ONE 156, which Sundell won the title by decision unanimous. However, Buntan pulled out from the bout due to family matters. She was replaced by current ONE Women's Atomweight Muay Thai champion Allycia Rodrigues.

The inaugural ONE Women's Atomweight Submission Grappling World Championship bout between Danielle Kelly and 2018 Asian Games gold medalist in Ju-jitsu Jessa Khan took place at the event.

A bantamweight bout between former ONE Bantamweight Champion John Lineker and Stephen Loman took place at the event. The pairing was previously scheduled to meet at ONE on TNT 4 in April 2021, but Loman withdrew from the bout due to tested positive for COVID-19.

At the weigh-ins, Xiong Jing Nan failed hydration despite making weight. The bout proceeded at a catchweight of 129 pounds, with Xiong being fined a percentage of her purse, which went to her opponent Wondergirl Jaroonsak.

== Results ==
Main card (Amazon Prime Video)
Weight class				Method	Round	Time	Notes
Women's Atomweight	Stamp Fairtex	def.	Ham Seo-hee	TKO (punches to the body)	3	1:04	(Note: For the vacant ONE Women's Atomweight World Championship.)
Women's Strawweight Muay Thai	Smilla Sundell (c)	def.	Allycia Rodrigues	TKO (punches and elbows)	3	2:58	(Note: For the ONE Women's Strawweight Muay thai World Championship.)
Women's Atomweight Submission Grappling	Danielle Kelly	def.	Jessa Khan	Decision (unanimous)	1	10:00	(Note: For the inaugural ONE Women's Atomweight Submission Grappling World Championship.)
Catchweight (129 lb)	Xiong Jing Nan	def.	Wondergirl Jaroonsak	TKO (punches)	3	2:42	(Note: Special rules striking bout.)
Bantamweight	John Lineker	def.	Stephen Loman	Decision (unanimous)	3	5:00
Lightweight Muay Thai	Dmitry Menshikov	def.	Rungrawee Sitsongpeenong	TKO (three knockdowns)	1	2:41
Lightweight	Eduard Folayang	def.	Amir Khan	KO (punch)	3	1:57
Heavyweight	Mauro Cerilli	def.	Paul Elliott	TKO (doctor stoppage)	1	5:00	(Note: Elliott's right bicep was torn, rendering him unable to continue.)
Bantamweight Muay Thai	Asa Ten Pow	def.	Rambolek Chor.Ajalaboon	KO (punch and head kick)	3	0:25
Lightweight	Maurice Abévi	def.	Blake Cooper	TKO (elbow and punches)	1	4:36

== Bonus awards ==
The following fighters received $50,000 bonuses.

- Performance of the Night: Stamp Fairtex, Smilla Sundell and Asa Ten Pow

== See also ==
- 2023 in ONE Championship
- List of ONE Championship events
- List of current ONE fighters
