= Cole Abate =

Brazilian jiu-jitsu practitioner from the US (born 2004)

- Born: 16 November 2004 (age 21); Beaumont, Texas, USA
- Style: Submission Grappling; Brazilian Jiu-Jitsu
- Team: Art of Jiu Jitsu (AOJ)
- Trainer: Guilherme and Rafael Mendes
- Rank: BJJ black belt

Cole Abate (born November 16, 2004) is an American submission grappler, and black belt Brazilian jiu-jitsu (BJJ) athlete. A competitor since early child years with multiple juvenile titles, Abate won, as a 16-year-old blue belt, the 2021 ADCC East Coast Trials.

== Early life ==
Cole Abate was born on 16 November 2004 in Beaumont, Texas, before his family settled in San Antonio. At the age of 5 he started Brazilian jiu-jitsu at a local gym. In 2019 his family moved to Costa Mesa where Cole joined Art of Jiu Jitsu (AOJ), training under Guilherme and Rafael Mendes.

== Career ==
Abate has been competing against adult athletes throughout his younger teenage years, first appearing on the preliminary card of Who's Number One: Gordon Ryan v Vagner Rocha on 26 March 2021. He was 15 years old at the time and defeated Ned Johnson by submission with a straight-ankle lock. He returned to the promotion at Who's Number One: Craig Jones v Luiz Panza on 28 May 2021, where he submitted Bird Wiltse with a triangle-armbar.

Abate was then invited to compete in the lightweight division of the Who's Number One Championships on 25 and 26 September 2021 against a bracket of adult competitors. He defeated 10th Planet Jiu Jitsu black belt Geo Martinez in the opening round before losing in the semi-final to Gabriel Sousa.

Abate won the 66 kg division of the ADCC North American East Coast Trials on 6 November 2021 despite being 16 years old and a blue belt in BJJ at the time. He was promoted to purple belt by Guilherme and Rafael Mendes shortly after this.

Abate competed at the 66 kg division of the 2022 ADCC World Championship, losing in the opening round to Fabricio Andrey by judge's decision. Abate was invited to return to Who's Number One to compete against Josh Cisneros on 11 November 2022. Cisneros withdrew from the match and was replaced by Damien Anderson, who Abate defeated by unanimous decision.

He then won the IBJJF European Championship in the purple belt lightweight on 25 January 2023, being promoted to brown belt on the podium.

In his first competition at brown belt, Abate won both the gi and no gi divisions of the IBJJF Los Angeles Open on 11 and 12 March 2023. Then on 23 March 2023, Abate won the Pan IBJJF Jiu-Jitsu Championship in the adult brown belt 168 lb category, his first appearance at an IBJJF major at brown belt.

Abate competed in the IBJJF Nashville Spring Open on 22 and 23 April 2023 where he won three gold medals in the lightweight gi division, the middleweight no gi division, and the no gi openweight division. On 1 June 2023, Abate won gold in the lightweight brown belt division at the IBJJF World Championship 2023. Abate then won the lightweight brown belt division at the IBJJF Asian Championship 2023 on July 9 and was promoted to black belt at the event.

=== 2023-2024 ===
Abate competed in his first black belt match at the Tough Roll Winter Grand Prix on June 29, 2023, submitting David Stoilescu with an armbar. Abate then made his IBJJF black belt debut at the IBJJF Absolute Grand Prix on September 1, 2023, against Eduardo Granzotto. He won the match on advantages.

Abate was due to compete against Ethan Crelinsten at Who's Number One 24 on June 20, 2024. He withdrew from the match on short notice and was replaced by Deandre Corbe. Abate then competed against Sam McNally at Polaris 29 on September 7, 2024. He won the match by decision.

Abate won two gold medals in the lightweight gi and no gi divisions at the IBJJF Atlanta Fall Open on September 22, 2024. He then also won gold medals in the lightweight gi and no gi divisions of the IBJJF Sacramento Fall Open on September 29, 2024, beating Wellington ‘Megaton’ Dias in the process. Abate then won a gold medal in the lightweight division of the IBJJF no gi Pan Championship 2024 on November 3, 2024.

Abate then signed a contract to compete for ONE Championship from 2024 onwards. He made his promotional debut against Shinya Aoki at ONE Fight Night 26 on December 6, 2024. He won the match by submission with a heel hook.

Abate won a gold medal in the featherweight division at the IBJJF No Gi World Championship 2024.

=== 2025 ===
Abate won a silver medal in the featherweight division of the IBJJF Pan Championship 2025. Abate will now face Samuel Nagai at ONE Fight Night 35 on September 5, 2025.

== Honors ==
Main Achievements:

- ADCC East Coast Trials Champion (2021)

Main Achievements (Colored Belts):

- IBJJF World Champion (2026 Black)
- IBJJF World Champion (2022 purple)
- IBJJF American Nationals Champion(2022 purple)
- 3rd place IBJJF Pan American Championship (2022 purple)

Main Achievements (Kids + Juvenile):

- IBJJF European Open Champion (2020)
- IBJJF World Champion No-Gi (2021)
- IBJJF Pan Champion No-Gi (2021 (Note: Weight and Absolute))
- IBJJF Pan Champion (2021)
- IBJJF Pan Kids Champion (2016 / 2018 / 2019)
- IBJJF American Nationals Kids Champion (2015 / 2016 / 2017 / 2018 / 2019)
- 2nd place IBJJF Pan Kids Championship (2014)
- 3rd place IBJJF Pan Kids Championship (2015 / 2017)
- ONE Championship
  - 2024: Ranked #5 Submission of the Year vs. Shinya Aoki
