= Enkh-Orgil Baatarkhuu =

Mongolian mixed martial arts fighter

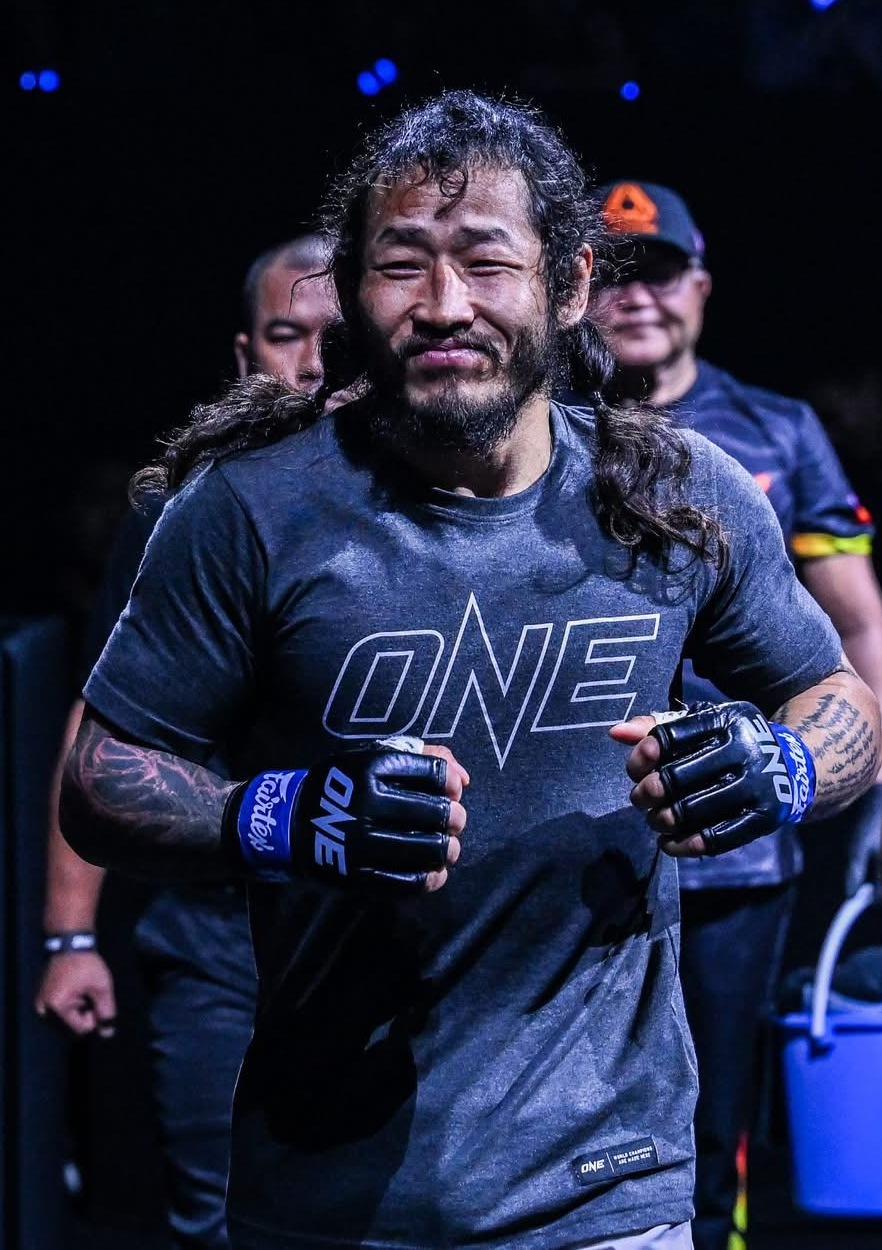
- Baatarkhuu in 2025
- Born: Баатархүү Энх-Оргил; December 30, 1988 (age 37); Khovd, Mongolia
- Other names: The Tormentor
- Height: 5 ft 6 in (1.68 m)
- Division: Featherweight (Note: As Enkh-Orgil is currently competing in ONE, he fights at 145 lbs. ONE Championship refers to their 145 lb division as Bantamweight, but per the Association of Boxing Commissions in the United States, 145 lbs is considered Featherweight.) (2019–present); Lightweight (2017); Welterweight (MMA) (2017)
- Reach: 69 in (175 cm)
- Fighting out of: Mongolia
- Team: Team Tungaa
- Years active: 2017–present

Mixed martial arts record
- Total: 18
- Wins: 14
- By knockout: 3
- By submission: 6
- By decision: 5
- Losses: 4
- By knockout: 3
- By decision: 1

Other information
- Mixed martial arts record from Sherdog

Enkh-Orgil Baatarkhuu (Mongolian: Баатархүү Энх-оргил (born 30 December 1988) is a Mongolian mixed martial artist who currently competes in the Bantamweight division of ONE Championship, where he is the former ONE Bantamweight MMA World Champion. He also competed in the Featherweight, Lightweight, and Welterweight divisions of MGL-1 Fighting Championship, where he was their Featherweight champion, and a two-time title challenger for the latter divisions.

== Early life ==
Baatarkhuu was born in Khovd in 1988. His father was a truck driver and his mother was a nurse, and he has two siblings. A fan of combat sports as a youth, he wrestled as a child before veering to taekwondo. He originally intended to pursue taekwondo in the Olympics, but became interested in mixed martial arts in 2009. While training in mixed martial arts, he studied as a fitness coach and in bodybuilding at the Avarga Institute of Physical Education. He graduated in 2012, and found a job as a fitness coach at the Oyu Tolgoi mine, and then found a lucrative position as a platform operator. Dissatisfied with his work life, Baatarkhuu decided to pursue MMA full time in 2016.

== Career ==
Baatarkhuu appeared in the 2022 reality show Road to ONE: Mongolia, a 10 episode reality program where he won US$100,000 and earned a spot in the ONE Championship and was trained by Jadamba Narantungalag. On 12 April 2023, he won his fight for at the ONE Friday Fights 13 via submission over Adonis Sevillino. He also won his fight in ONE Friday Fights 17 on 19 May 2023, a TKO over Rockie Bactol where he won a "Fight of the Night" bonus of $10,000. On 5 August 2023, he won his fight in the ONE Fight Night 13 via submission over Jhanlo Mark Sangiao, again winning a "Fight of the Night" bonus of $50,000.

On 11 January 2025 he was a substitute entrant on ONE Fight Night 27, and won via submission over Aaron Cañarte. He was scheduled as the headliner for the ONE Fight Night 38 on 6 December 2025 against Fabrício Andrade.

On 6 December 2025, Baatarkhuu fought against Fabrício Andrade and despite being hurt early in round one, secured a victory against his opponent in round 4 at 3:29 with a rear-naked choke and was crowned the new world Bantam Weight Champion. He was also awarded a fight bonus of US$50,000.

Baatarkhuu was scheduled to make his first title defense of the Bantamweight championship against Elbek Alyshov, at The Inner Circle 24, on July 31, 2026. He lost the fight by knockout in the second round, by knockout, losing his bantamweight title in the process.

== In other media ==
In 2025, Baatarkhuu appeared for Team Mongolia on the Netflix reality competition series Physical: Asia, which premiered on 28 October 2025.

== Mixed martial arts record ==
Professional record breakdown
18 matches	14 wins	4 losses
By knockout	3	3
By submission	6	0
By decision	5	1

Res.	Record	Opponent	Method	Event	Date	Round	Time	Location	Notes
Loss	14–4	Elbek Alyshov	KO (punches)	ONE: The Inner Circle 24	July 31, 2026	2	2:52	Bangkok, Thailand	Lost the ONE Bantamweight Championship (145 lb).
Win	14–3	Fabrício Andrade	Submission (rear-naked choke)	ONE Fight Night 38	December 6, 2025	4	3:29	Bangkok, Thailand	Won the ONE Bantamweight Championship (145 lb).
Win	13–3	Jeremy Pacatiw	Decision (unanimous)	ONE Fight Night 29	March 7, 2025	3	5:00	Bangkok, Thailand	
Win	12–3	Aaron Cañarte	Submission (kimura)	ONE Fight Night 27	January 11, 2025	1	3:43	Bangkok, Thailand	Lightweight bout; Cañarte missed weight (160.75 lb).
Win	11–3	Carlo Bumina-ang	Technical Submission (arm-triangle choke)	ONE Fight Night 24	August 3, 2024	3	4:59	Bangkok, Thailand	
Loss	10–3	Artem Belakh	TKO (knee and punches)	ONE Fight Night 18	January 13, 2024	2	4:55	Bangkok, Thailand	
Win	10–2	Jhanlo Mark Sangiao	Submission (kimura)	ONE Fight Night 13	August 5, 2023	2	2:53	Bangkok, Thailand	Performance of the Night.
Win	9–2	Rockie Bactol	TKO (punches and elbows)	ONE Friday Fights 17	May 19, 2023	1	4:59	Bangkok, Thailand	Performance of the Night.
Win	8–2	Adonis Sevilleno	Decision (unanimous)	ONE Friday Fights 13	April 21, 2023	3	5:00	Bangkok, Thailand	
Win	7–2	Batochir Batsaikhan	KO (punch)	Road to ONE: Warriors of the Steppe Finals	November 26, 2022	1	1:09	Ulaanbaatar, Mongolia	
Win	6–2	Bayarjargal Tsendoo	Submission (rear-naked choke)	Road to ONE: Warriors of the Steppe Semifinals	November 20, 2022	2	4:05	Ulaanbaatar, Mongolia	
Win	5–2	Gantulkhuur Ariunbileg	Decision (unanimous)	MGL-1 FC 16	December 26, 2021	5	5:00	Ulaanbaatar, Mongolia	Won the vacant MGL-1 Featherweight Championship.
Win	4–2	Turbayar Khurelbaatar	Submission (kimura)	MGL-1 FC 14	August 22, 2020	2	4:01	Ulaanbaatar, Mongolia	
Win	3–2	Solangy Saaya	Decision (unanimous)	MGL-1 FC 13	December 6, 2019	3	5:00	Ulaanbaatar, Mongolia	
Win	2–2	Bato Damdinov	TKO (corner stoppage)	Buryatia MMA Federation: Festival of Combat Sports and Martial Arts	March 23, 2019	2	1:31	Ulan-Ude, Russia	Featherweight debut.
Loss	1–2	Tsogookhuu Amarsanaa	Decision (unanimous)	MGL-1 FC 12	October 27, 2018	5	5:00	Ulaanbaatar, Mongolia	Lightweight debut. For the vacant MGL-1 Lightweight Championship.
Win	1–1	Davaabayar Enkhtaivan	Decision (split)	MGL-1 FC: Fight Night 2	April 19, 2018	3	5:00	Ulaanbaatar, Mongolia	
Loss	0–1	Batsumberel Dagvadorj	TKO (punches)	MGL-1 FC: Master Tulaanch Final	June 4, 2017	2	3:00	Ulaanbaatar, Mongolia	Welterweight debut. For the vacant MGL-1 Welterweight Championship.

== Filmography ==
=== Web shows ===
Year	Title	Role	Notes	Ref.
2025	Physical: Asia	Contestant	Netflix	
