= Danielle Kelly (grappler) =

American submission grappler (born 1995)

- Born: December 4, 1995 (age 30); Philadelphia, Pennsylvania, United States
- Height: 5 ft 1 in (1.55 m)
- Weight: 115 lb (52 kg)
- Division: Atomweight
- Team: Silver Fox BJJ; Evolve MMA
- Rank: 1st degree black belt in BJJ under Karel Pravec

Danielle Kelly (born December 4, 1995) is an American submission grappler and Brazilian jiu-jitsu black belt who was the inaugural and former ONE Atomweight Submission Grappling World Champion. She has wins over IBJJF World Champion Jessa Khan, Roxanne Modafferi, Cynthia Calvillo and the former UFC Women's Strawweight Champion Carla Esparza.

== Career ==
=== Fury Pro Grappling ===
Kelly fought Cathryn Millares in the co-main event of Fury Pro Grappling 2 on October 29, 2021 and won the match by unanimous decision. Kelly was scheduled to face Rose Namajunas at Fury Pro Grappling 3 on December 30, 2021. However, Namajunas was forced to withdraw from the event at the last minute due to a positive Covid-19 test and was replaced by Carla Esparza. During the match, Esparza slammed Kelly from full guard and the resulting clash of heads opened up a cut above Esparza's eyebrow. The doctors attending called the match off and the victory was awarded to Kelly as a result of the injury.

=== Who's Number One ===
Kelly made her debut for Who's Number One on February 26, 2021 at WNO: Craig Jones v Ronaldo Junior, where she lost a unanimous decision to Jessa Khan. She returned on June 18, 2021 at WNO: Craig Jones v Tye Ruotolo and submitted Jessica Crane with a kneebar in the first match of the event. These performances earned her an invitation to compete for a title in the Women's Strawweight division of the Who's Number One Championships on September 25–26, 2021. Kelly lost by unanimous decision to Grace Gundrum in the opening round, before submitting Jessica Crane with a heelhook in the first round of the consolation bracket. She was then submitted with an armlock by Tammi Musumeci and did not make it to the third-place final match.

=== ONE Championship ===
On February 17, 2022, it was announced that Kelly signed with ONE Championship to compete in grappling, as well as mixed martial arts if she wished to.

Kelly made her promotional debut against Japanese veteran Mei Yamaguchi in an atomweight submission grappling match at ONE: X on March 26, 2022. The match ended in a draw after neither could find the submission. This win earned her the Performance of the Night award.

Kelly faced Sambo World Champion Mariia Molchanova at ONE on Prime Video 4 on November 19, 2022. She won the fight via rear-naked choke. This win earned her the Performance of the Night award.

Kelly faced Ayaka Miura at ONE Fight Night 7 on February 25, 2023. She won the match by unanimous decision.

==== ONE Atomweight Submission Grappling World Championship ====
Kelly faced Jessa Khan in a rematch for the inaugural ONE Women's Atomweight Submission Grappling World Championship on September 30, 2023 at ONE Fight Night 14. Kelly won the match by decision and became the promotion's first female submission grappling world champion.

Kelly defended her title against Mayssa Bastos at ONE Fight Night 24 on August 2nd, 2024. She lost the fight via unanimous decision.

Kelly challenged Mayssa Bastos for her ONE Women's Atomweight Submission Grappling World Title in a rematch on December 6, 2024 at ONE Fight Night 26. She lost the match by decision.

=== Other Promotions ===
Kelly fought UFC veteran Roxanne Modafferi in the main event of Submission Hunter Pro 60 on October 25, 2020, submitting her with a toehold.

She fought at the inaugural UFC Fightpass Invitational on December 16, 2021, taking on Alexa Yanes. Kelly lost the match via split decision.

== Instructor lineage ==
Kano Jigoro → Tomita Tsunejirō → Mitsuyo Maeda → Carlos Gracie Sr. → Hélio Gracie → Rolls Gracie → Carlos Gracie Jr. → Renzo Gracie → Karel Pavec → Danielle Kelly

== Championships and accomplishments ==
- ONE Championship
  - ONE Women's Atomweight Submission Grappling World Champion (One time; former; inaugural)
  - Performance of the Night (Two times) vs. Mei Yamaguchi and Mariia Molchanova
- RISE Invitational
  - Rise Invitational 3 125 lbs Championship (2018)
- Submission Hunter Pro
  - SHP 130 lbs No Gi Champion

== Submission grappling record ==
Professional record breakdown
32 matches	20 wins	11 losses
By submission	14	3
By decision	6	8
Draws	1	

Result	Record	Opponent	Method	Event	Division	Type	Date	Location
Loss	20–11–1	(Brazil) Mayssa Bastos	Decision (unanimous)	ONE Fight Night 26	−115 lbs	Submission Grappling	December 7, 2024	(Thailand) Bangkok
Loss	20–10–1	(Brazil) Mayssa Bastos	Decision (unanimous)	ONE Fight Night 24	−115 lbs	Submission Grappling	August 3, 2024	(Thailand) Bangkok
Win	20–9–1	(Cambodia) Jessa Khan	Decision (unanimous)	ONE Fight Night 14	−115 lbs	Nogi	September 29, 2023	(Singapore) Kallang
Win	19–9–1	(Japan) Ayaka Miura	Decision (unanimous)	ONE Fight Night 7	−119 lbs	Nogi	February 24, 2023	(Thailand) Bangkok
Win	18–9–1	(Russia) Mariia Molchanova	Submission (rear-naked choke)	ONE on Prime Video 4	−115 lbs	Nogi	November 18, 2022	(Singapore) Kallang
Draw	17–9–1	(Japan) Mei Yamaguchi	Draw (time expire)	ONE: X	−115 lbs	Nogi	March 26, 2022	(Singapore) Kallang
Win	17–9	(United States) Carla Esparza	Doctor stoppage (cut)	Fury Pro Grappling 3	−115 lbs	Nogi	December 30, 2021	(United States) Philadelphia, PA
Loss	16–9	(United States) Alexa Yanes	Decision (split)	UFC Fight Pass Invitational	−125 lbs	Nogi	December 16, 2021	(United States) Las Vegas, NV
Win	16–8	(United States) Cathryn Millares	Decision	Fury Pro Grappling 2	−115 lbs	Nogi	October 29, 2021	(United States) Philadelphia, PA
Loss	15–8	(United States) Tammi Musumeci	Submission (armlock)	Who's Number One Championship	–115 lbs	Nogi	September 26, 2021	(United States) Austin, TX
Win	15–7	(United States) Jessica Crane	Submission (inside heel hook)	Who's Number One Championship	–115 lbs	Nogi	September 26, 2021	(United States) Austin, TX
Loss	14–7	(United States) Grace Gundrum	Decision	Who's Number One Championship	–115 lbs	Nogi	September 25, 2021	(United States) Austin, TX
Win	14–6	(United States) Sofia Amarante	Submission (rear-naked choke)	Fury Pro Grappling 1	−115 lbs	Nogi	July 2, 2021	(United States) Philadelphia, PA
Win	13–6	(United States) Jessica Crane	Submission (kneebar)	WNO: Craig Jones vs Tye Ruotolo	−115 lbs	Nogi	June 18, 2021	(United States) Austin, TX
Loss	12–6	(Cambodia) Jessa Khan	Decision	WNO: Craig Jones vs Ronaldo Junior	−115 lbs	Nogi	February 26, 2021	(United States) Austin, TX
Win	12–5	(United States) Roxanne Modafferi	Submission (toe hold)	Sumision Hunter Pro 60	−130 lbs	Nogi	October 25, 2020	(United States) Houston, TX
Loss	11–5	(United States) Grace Gundrum	Fastest Escape Time	Jiu-Jitsu Over Time: The Featherweights	−115 lbs	Nogi	July 19, 2020	(United States) Los Angeles, CA
Loss	11–4	(United States) Nicole Sullivan	Submission	2020 IBJJF San Jose Open No Gi	−135.6 lbs	Nogi	February 25, 2020	(United States) San Jose, CA
Win	11–3	(United States) Cynthia Calvillo	Submission (ankle lock)	Quintet Ultra	−115 lbs	Nogi	December 12, 2019	(United States) Las Vegas, NV
Win	10–3	(United States) Jillian DeCoursey	Submission (kneebar)	Rise Invitational 8	−115 lbs	Nogi	October 26, 2019	(United States) Westbury, NY
Win	9–3	(United States) Brittany Way	OT	2019 SubStars at The Tank 2	−115 lbs	Nogi	July 19, 2019	(United States) Miami, FL
Win	8–3	(United States) Mariuxi Llaguno	Points	2019 JitzKing Tampa	−125 lbs	Nogi	July 6, 2019	(United States) Tampa, FL
Loss	7–3	(United States) Nicole Sullivan	Submission	2019 ADCC West Coast Trials	–60 kg	Nogi	February 9, 2019	(United States) Burbank, CA
Win	7–2	(United States) Jessica Buchman	Submission	2019 ADCC West Coast Trials	–60 kg	Nogi	February 9, 2019	(United States) Burbank, CA
Win	6–2	(United States) Alison Stiegler	Submission	2019 ADCC West Coast Trials	–60 kg	Nogi	February 9, 2019	(United States) Burbank, CA
Loss	5–2	(Japan) Rikako Yuasa	Fastest Escape Time	EBI 18	–115 lbs	Nogi	December 9, 2018	(United States) Austin, TX
Win	5–1	(United States) Lilaa Smadja	Submission (armbar)	EBI 18	–115 lbs	Nogi	December 9, 2018	(United States) Austin, TX
Win	4–1	(Brazil) Bruna Bruns	Submission (heel hook)	Fight 2 Win 81	−115 lbs	Nogi	July 21, 2018	(United States) Philadelphia, PA
Win	3–1	(United States) Amanda Krammy	Submission (armbar)	Rise Invitational 3	–125 lbs	Nogi	January 13, 2018	(United States) Westbury, NY
Win	2–1	(United States) Lauren Braccia	Submission (armbar)	Rise Invitational 3	–125 lbs	Nogi	January 13, 2018	(United States) Westbury, NY
Win	1–1	(United States) Lilaa Smadja	OT	2014 Pan Jiu-Jitsu IBJJF Championship	–125 lbs	Nogi	March 12, 2014	(United States) Irvine, CA
Loss	0–1	(Japan) Rikako Yuasa	OT	2014 Pan Jiu-Jitsu IBJJF Championship	–125 lbs	Nogi	March 12, 2014	(United States) Irvine, CA
