= ONE Fight Night 24 =

Combat sport events in 2024

ONE Fight Night 24: Brooks vs. Balart
- The poster for ONE Fight Night 24: Brooks vs. Balart
- Promotion: ONE Championship
- Date: August 3, 2024
- Venue: Lumpinee Boxing Stadium
- City: Bangkok, Thailand

Event chronology
ONE Friday Fights 73: Worapon vs. Panrit	ONE Fight Night 24: Brooks vs. Balart	ONE Friday Fights 74: Yodphupha vs. Gheirati

ONE Fight Night 24: Brooks vs. Balart was a combat sport event produced by ONE Championship that took place on August 3, 2024, at Lumpinee Boxing Stadium in Bangkok, Thailand.

== Background ==
The event was headlined by an interim ONE Strawweight World Championship bout between former champion Jarred Brooks and Gustavo Balart. At the weigh-ins, Balart came in at 126 lb (after coming in at 131.75 lb in his first attempt), 1 pounds over the limit. As a result, Balart was fined 25% of his purse and was ineligible for the title, only Brooks was eligible to win the title.

A ONE Women's Atomweight Submission Grappling World Championship bout between current champion Danielle Kelly and multiple-time IBJJF World Champion Mayssa Bastos took place at co-main event.

Asa Ten Pow was expected to face Carlo Bumina-ang in a bantamweight MMA bout. However, Ten Pow pulled out for unknown reasons and was replaced by Enkh-Orgil Baatarkhuu.

A bantamweight muay thai bout between Ferrari Fairtex and Vladimir Kuzmin was scheduled for this event, but Kuzmin withdrew due to injury and was replaced by Felipe Lobo. In turn, the promotion opted to book Ferrari against Dmitrii Kovtun and Lobo faced Nabil Anane instead.

Thongpoon P.K.Saenchai was scheduled to face Aliff Sor.Dechaphan at this event, but he pulled out for unknown reasons and was replaced by Zakaria El Jamari.

Also at the weigh-ins, five fighters missed weight:

- Dedduanglek Wankhongohm MBK weighed in at 139 pounds, 4 pound over the flyweight limit.
- Dmitrii Kovtun weighed in at 145.5 pounds, 0.5 pound over the bantamweight limit.
- Both fighters missed weight between Rambolek Chor.Ajalaboon at 145.75 pounds and Craig Coakley at 151.5 pounds, 0.75 pound and 6.5 pound over the bantamweight fight limit, respectively.
- Zakaria El Jamari weighed in at 132.75 pounds, 4.75 pound over the 128-pounds bout.

All fours bout proceeded at catchweight. Dedduanglek and Kovtun was fined 25% of his purse which went to their opponents Nakrob Fairtex and Ferrari Fairtex respectively. El Jamari was fined 30% of his purse which went to their opponents Aliff Sor.Dechapan. The bout between Rambolek and Coakley was not fined of his purse.

== Results ==
Fight card (Amazon Prime Video)
Weight class				Method	Round	Time	Notes
Strawweight	Jarred Brooks	def.	Gustavo Balart	Submission (rear-naked choke)	1	4:39	(Note: For the interim ONE Strawweight World Championship. Balart missed weight (126 lb) and was ineligible for the title.)
Women's Atomweight Submission Grappling	Mayssa Bastos	def.	Danielle Kelly (c)	Decision (unanimous)	1	10:00	(Note: For the ONE Women's Atomweight Submission Grappling World Championship.)
Bantamweight Muay Thai	Nabil Anane	def.	Felipe Lobo	Decision (unanimous)	3	3:00
Flyweight Muay Thai	Nakrob Fairtex	def.	Dedduanglek Wankhongohm MBK	Decision (unanimous)	3	3:00	(Note: Dedduanglek missed weight (139 lb).)
Featherweight	Shamil Gasanov	def.	Aaron Cañarte	Decision (unanimous)	3	5:00
Bantamweight Muay Thai	Dmitrii Kovtun	def.	Ferrari Fairtex	Decision (unanimous)	3	3:00	(Note: Kovtun missed weight (145.5 lb).)
Flyweight Kickboxing	Elias Mahmoudi	def.	Taiki Naito	KO (spinning backfist)	3	2:56
Strawweight	Keito Yamakita	def.	Yosuke Saruta	Decision (split)	3	5:00
Bantamweight Muay Thai	Rambolek Chor.Ajalaboon	def.	Craig Coakley	Decision (unanimous)	3	3:00	(Note: Both fighters missed weight: Rambolek (145.75 lb) and Coakley (151.5 lb).)
Bantamweight	Enkh-Orgil Baatarkhuu	def.	Carlo Bumina-ang	Technical Submission (arm-triangle choke)	3	4:59
Catchweight (128 lb) Muay Thai	Aliff Sor.Dechapan	def.	Zakaria El Jamari	KO (punch to the body)	1	1:37	(Note: El Jamari missed weight (132.75 lb).)
Women's Atomweight Muay Thai	Amy Pirnie	def.	Yu Yau Pui	KO (punch)	1	0:49

== Bonus awards ==
The following fighters received $50,000 bonuses.

- Performance of the Night: Mayssa Bastos, Elias Mahmoudi and Aliff Sor.Dechapan

== See also ==
- 2024 in ONE Championship
- List of ONE Championship events
- List of current ONE fighters
- ONE Championship Rankings
