= List of ONE Championship champions =

This is a list of ONE Championship champions in each weight division of each sport.

== Current champions ==
Men
Division	Champion	Since	Ref.	Defenses
Mixed martial arts
Heavyweight 265 lb (120.2 kg)	Vacant	May 15, 2026		
Light heavyweight 225 lb (102.1 kg)	Vacant	May 15, 2026		
Middleweight 205 lb (93.0 kg)	Vacant	May 15, 2026		
Welterweight 185 lb (83.9 kg)	Vacant	November 18, 2026		
Lightweight 170 lb (77.1 kg)	(United States) Tye Ruotolo	Nov 6, 2026		0
Featherweight 155 lb (70.3 kg)	(China) Tang Kai	Aug 26, 2022		2
Bantamweight 145 lb (65.8 kg)	(Azerbaijan) Elbek Alyshov	Jul 31, 2026		0
Flyweight 135 lb (61.2 kg)	(Uzbekistan) Avazbek Kholmirzaev	Apr 29, 2026		0
Strawweight 125 lb (56.7 kg)	(Philippines) Joshua Pacio	Mar 1, 2024		2
Kickboxing
Heavyweight Above 225 lb (102.1 kg)	(Ukraine) Roman Kryklia	Jun 19, 2026		0
Light Heavyweight 225 lb (102.1 kg)	(Ukraine) Roman Kryklia	Nov 16, 2019		2
Lightweight 170 lb (77.1 kg)	(Suriname) Regian Eersel	Apr 10, 2026		0
Featherweight 155 lb (70.3 kg)	(Thailand) Superbon Singha Mawynn	Jan 6, 2025		1
Bantamweight 145 lb (65.8 kg)	(England) Jonathan Haggerty	Nov 4, 2023		3
Flyweight 135 lb (61.2 kg)	(Thailand) Superlek Kiatmuukao	Jan 14, 2023		2
Strawweight 125 lb (56.7 kg)	(Canada) Jonathan Di Bella	Oct 4, 2025		0
Muay Thai
Heavyweight Above 225 lb (102.1 kg)	(Ukraine) Roman Kryklia	Dec 8, 2023		1
Lightweight 170 lb (77.1 kg)	(Suriname) Regian Eersel	Oct 22, 2022		3
Featherweight 155 lb (70.3 kg)	(Scotland) Nico Carrillo	Jul 21, 2026		0
Bantamweight 145 lb (65.8 kg)	(Thailand) Yod-Iq Or Pimolsri	Sep 11, 2026		0
Flyweight 135 lb (61.2 kg)	(Russia) Asadula Imangazaliev	June 26, 2026		0
Strawweight 125 lb (56.7 kg)	(Thailand) Prajanchai P.K. Saenchai	Dec 22, 2023		1
Atomweight 115 lb (52.2 kg)	(Japan) Nadaka Yoshinari	November 16, 2025		2
Submission grappling
Welterweight 185 lb (83.9 kg)	(United States) Tye Ruotolo	Nov 4, 2023		3
Lightweight 170 lb (77.1 kg)	(United States) Kade Ruotolo	Oct 22, 2022		3
Flyweight 135 lb (61.2 kg)	(Brazil) Diogo Reis	Dec 6, 2025		0

Women
Division	Champion	Since	Ref.	Defenses
Mixed martial arts
Atomweight 115 lb (52.2 kg)	Vacant	June 23, 2026		
Kickboxing
Strawweight 125 lb (56.7 kg)	(Austria) Stella Hemetsberger	Feb 14, 2026		0
Atomweight 115 lb (52.2 kg)	(Thailand) Phetjeeja Lukjaoporongtom	Mar 9, 2024		2
Muay Thai
Strawweight 125 lb (56.7 kg)	(Austria) Stella Hemetsberger	Sep 6, 2025	–	1
Atomweight 115 lb (52.2 kg)	(Brazil) Allycia Rodrigues	Aug 28, 2020		5

== Men's championship history ==
=== Heavyweight World Championship ===
Weight limit

— MMA: 265 lb (120.2 kg)
— Kickboxing / Muay Thai: Unlimited

Mixed martial arts (MMA)
No.	Name	Event	Date	Reign	Defenses
1	(United States) Brandon Vera def. Paul Cheng	ONE: Spirit of Champions; Pasay, Philippines	Dec 11, 2015	1982 days	1. def. Hideki Sekine at ONE: Age of Domination on Dec 2, 2016; 2. def. Mauro Cerilli at ONE: Conquest of Champions on Nov 23, 2018
2	(Canada) Arjan Bhullar	ONE: Dangal; Kallang, Singapore	May 15, 2021	769 days	
—	(Russia) Anatoly Malykhin def. Kirill Grishenko for interim title	ONE: Bad Blood; Kallang, Singapore	Feb 11, 2022	—	
3	(Russia) Anatoly Malykhin	ONE Friday Fights 22; Bangkok, Thailand	Jun 23, 2023	505 days	
4	(Senegal) Oumar Kane	ONE 169; Bangkok, Thailand	Nov 9, 2024	552 days	
5	(Russia) Anatoly Malykhin (2)	The Inner Circle 14; Bangkok, Thailand	May 15, 2026	0 days	
The title was vacated after Malykhin announced his retirement from MMA on May 15, 2026.
Kickboxing
No.	Name	Event	Date	Reign	Defenses
1	(Turkey) Samet Agdeve def. Roman Kryklia	ONE Fight Night 37; Bangkok, Thailand	Nov 8, 2025	223 days	
2	(Ukraine) Roman Kryklia	The Inner Circle 19; Bangkok, Thailand	Jun 19, 2026	154 days (incumbent)	
Muay Thai
No.	Name	Event	Date	Reign	Defenses
1	(Ukraine) Roman Kryklia def. Alex Roberts	ONE Fight Night 17; Bangkok, Thailand	Dec 8, 2023	1078 days (incumbent)	1. def. Lyndon Knowles at ONE Fight Night 30 on April 5, 2025

=== Light Heavyweight World Championship ===
Weight limit: 225 lb (102.1 kg)

Mixed martial arts (MMA)
No.	Name	Event	Date	Reign	Defenses
1	(Brazil) Roger Gracie def. Michal Pasternak	ONE: Ascent to Power; Kallang, Singapore	May 6, 2016	526 days	
The title was vacated after Roger Gracie announced his retirement from MMA on October 14, 2017.
2	(Myanmar) Aung La Nsang def. Alexandre Machado	ONE: Quest for Gold; Yangon, Myanmar	Feb 23, 2018	1160 days	1. def. Brandon Vera at ONE: Century − Part 2 on Oct 13, 2019
3	(Netherlands) Reinier de Ridder	ONE on TNT 4 Kallang, Singapore	Apr 28, 2021	584 days	
4	(Russia) Anatoly Malykhin	ONE on Prime Video 5 Pasay, Philippines	Dec 3, 2022	1259 days	
The title was vacated after Malykhin announced his retirement from MMA on May 15, 2026.
Kickboxing
No.	Name	Event	Date	Reign	Defenses
1	(Ukraine) Roman Kryklia def. Tarik Khbabez	ONE: Age Of Dragons; Beijing, China	Nov 16, 2019	2561 days (incumbent)	1. def. Andrei Stoica at ONE: Collision Course on Dec 18, 2020; 2. def. Murat Aygün at ONE: Full Circle on Feb 25, 2022

=== Middleweight World Championship ===
Weight limit: 205 lb (93 kg)

Mixed martial arts (MMA)
No.	Name	Event	Date	Reign	Defenses
1	(Kazakhstan) Igor Svirid def. Leandro Ataides	ONE: Battle of the Lions; Kallang, Singapore	Nov 7, 2014	336 days	
2	(Russia) Vitaly Bigdash	ONE: Tigers of Asia; Kuala Lumpur, Malaysia	Oct 9, 2015	630 days	1. def. Aung La Nsang at ONE: Quest for Power on Jan 14, 2017
3	(Myanmar) Aung La Nsang	ONE: Light of a Nation; Yangon, Myanmar	Jun 30, 2017	1218 days	1. def. Ken Hasegawa at ONE: Spirit of a Warrior on Jun 29, 2018; 2. def. Mohammad Karaki at ONE: Pursuit of Greatness on Oct 26, 2018; 3. def. Ken Hasegawa at ONE: A New Era on Mar 31, 2019
4	(Netherlands) Reinier de Ridder	ONE: Inside the Matrix; Kallang, Singapore	Oct 30, 2020	1218 days	1. def. Kiamrian Abbasov at ONE: Full Circle on Feb 25, 2022; 2. def. Vitaly Bigdash at ONE 159 on Jul 22, 2022
5	(Russia) Anatoly Malykhin	ONE 166; Lusail, Qatar	Mar 1, 2024	805 days	
The title was vacated after Malykhin announced his retirement from MMA on May 15, 2026.

=== Welterweight World Championship ===
Weight limit: 185 lb (83.9 kg)

Mixed martial arts (MMA)
No.	Name	Event	Date	Reign	Defenses
1	(Japan) Nobutatsu Suzuki def. Brock Larson	ONE: War of Nations; Kuala Lumpur, Malaysia	Mar 14, 2014	168 days	
2	(United States) Ben Askren	ONE: Reign of Champions; Dubai, United Arab Emirates	Aug 29, 2014	1520 days	NC. against Luis Santos at ONE: Valor of Champions on Apr 24, 2015; 1. def. Agilan Thani at ONE: Dynasty of Heroes on May 26, 2017; 2. def. Zebaztian Kadestam at ONE: Shanghai on Sep 2, 2017; 3. def. Shinya Aoki at ONE: Immortal Pursuit on Nov 24, 2017
Askren vacated the title on October 27, 2018 when he was released from his contract.
3	(Sweden) Zebaztian Kadestam def. Tyler McGuire	ONE: Warrior's Dream; Jakarta, Indonesia	Nov 17, 2018	342 days	1. def. Georgiy Kichigin at ONE: Reign of Valor on Mar 8, 2019
4	(Kyrgyzstan) Kiamrian Abbasov	ONE: Dawn Of Valor; Jakarta, Indonesia	Oct 25, 2019	1119 days	1. def. James Nakashima at ONE: Inside the Matrix 2 on Nov 6, 2020
Abbasov was stripped of the title on November 17, 2022, after failing to make weight for his title defense against Christian Lee at ONE on Prime Video 4.
5	(United States) Christian Lee def. Kiamrian Abbasov	ONE on Prime Video 4 Kallang, Singapore	Nov 19, 2022	1460 days	
Lee was stripped of the title on November 18, 2026 due to inactivity.					
Submission grappling
No.	Name	Event	Date	Reign	Defenses
1	(United States) Tye Ruotolo def. Magomed Abdulkadirov	ONE Fight Night 16; Bangkok, Thailand	Nov 4, 2023	1112 days (incumbent)	1. def. Izaak Michell at ONE Fight Night 21 on Apr 6, 2024; 2. def. Dante Leon at ONE Fight Night 31 on May 3, 2025; 3. def. Paweł Jaworski at ONE Fight Night 41 on Mar 14, 2026

=== Lightweight World Championship ===
Weight limit: 170 lb (77.1 kg)

Mixed martial arts (MMA)
No.	Name	Event	Date	Reign	Defenses
1	(South Korea) Kotetsu Boku def. Zorobabel Moreira	ONE: Rise of Kings; Kallang, Singapore	Oct 6, 2012	181 days	
2	(Japan) Shinya Aoki	ONE: Kings and Champions; Kallang, Singapore	Apr 5, 2013	1316 days	1. def. Kamal Shalorus at ONE: Reign of Champions on Aug 29, 2014; 2. def. Koji Ando at ONE: Warrior's Quest on May 22, 2015
3	(Philippines) Eduard Folayang	ONE: Defending Honor; Kallang, Singapore	Nov 11, 2016	364 days	1. def. Ev Ting at ONE: Kings of Destiny on Apr 21, 2017
4	(Australia) Martin Nguyen	ONE: Legends of the World; Pasay, Philippines	Nov 10, 2017	322 days	
Nguyen vacated the title on September 28, 2018 due to suffering an injury in training, rendering him unable to defend the title.
5	(Philippines) Eduard Folayang (2) def. Amir Khan	ONE: Conquest of Champions; Pasay, Philippines	Nov 23, 2018	128 days (492 days)	
6	(Japan) Shinya Aoki (2)	ONE: A New Era; Tokyo, Japan	Mar 31, 2019	47 days (1410 days)	
7	(United States) Christian Lee	ONE: Enter the Dragon; Kallang, Singapore	May 17, 2019	861 days	1. def. Iuri Lapicus at ONE: Inside the Matrix on Oct 30, 2020; 2. def. Timofey Nastyukhin at ONE on TNT 2 on Apr 14, 2021
8	(South Korea) Ok Rae-yoon	ONE: Revolution; Kallang, Singapore	Sep 24, 2021	336 days	
9	(United States) Christian Lee (2)	ONE 160; Kallang, Singapore	Aug 26, 2022	1533 days (2394 days)	NC. against Alibeg Rasulov at ONE Fight Night 26 on Dec 7, 2024; 1. def. Alibeg Rasulov at ONE 173 on Nov 16, 2025
10	(United States) Tye Ruotolo	ONE: The Inner Circle 37; Bangkok, Thailand	Nov 6, 2026	14 days (incumbent)	
Kickboxing
No.	Name	Event	Date	Reign	Defenses
1	(Suriname) Regian Eersel def. Nieky Holzken	ONE: Enter the Dragon; Kallang, Singapore	May 17, 2019	1786 days	1. def. Nieky Holzken at ONE: Dawn Of Valor on Oct 25, 2019; 2. def. Mustapha Haida at ONE: Fists Of Fury 3 on Feb 26, 2021; 3. def. Islam Murtazaev at ONE: Winter Warriors on Dec 3, 2021; 4. def. Arian Sadiković at ONE 156 on Apr 22, 2022
2	(France) Alexis Nicolas	ONE Fight Night 21; Bangkok, Thailand	April 6, 2024	182 days	
3	(Suriname) Regian Eersel (2)	ONE Fight Night 25; Bangkok, Thailand	Oct 5, 2024	180 days (1966 days)	
Eersel was stripped of the title on April 3, 2025, after failing to hydration test for his title defense against Alexis Nicolas at ONE Fight Night 30.
4	(Suriname) Regian Eersel (3) def. Rungrawee Sitsongpeenong	ONE: The Inner Circle 10; Bangkok, Thailand	Apr 10, 2026	224 days (incumbent)	
Muay Thai
No.	Name	Event	Date	Reign	Defenses
1	(Suriname) Regian Eersel def. Sinsamut Klinmee	ONE on Prime Video 3 Kuala Lumpur, Malaysia	Oct 22, 2022	1490 days (incumbent)	1. def. Sinsamut Klinmee at ONE Friday Fights 9 on Mar 17, 2023; 2. def. Dmitry Menshikov at ONE Fight Night 11 on June 9, 2023; 3.def. George Jarvis at ONE Fight Night 34 on Aug 2, 2025; 4.def. George Jarvis at ONE: The Inner Circle 33 on Oct 2, 2026
Submission grappling
No.	Name	Event	Date	Reign	Defenses
1	(United States) Kade Ruotolo def. Uali Kurzhev	ONE on Prime Video 3 Kuala Lumpur, Malaysia	Oct 22, 2022	1490 days (incumbent)	1. def. Matheus Gabriel at ONE on Prime Video 5 on Dec 3, 2022; 2. def. Tommy Langaker at ONE Fight Night 11 on June 9, 2023; 3. def. Tommy Langaker at ONE 165 on January 28, 2024

=== Featherweight World Championship ===
Weight limit: 155 lb (70.3 kg)

Mixed martial arts (MMA)
No.	Name	Event	Date	Reign	Defenses
1	(Philippines) Honorio Banario def. Eric Kelly	ONE: Return of Warriors; Kuala Lumpur, Malaysia	Feb 2, 2013	118 days	
2	(Japan) Koji Oishi	ONE FC: Rise to Power; Pasay, Philippines	May 31, 2013	455 days	1. def. Honorio Banario at ONE: Moment of Truth on Dec 6, 2013
3	(Mongolia) Jadamba Narantungalag	ONE: Reign of Champions; Dubai, United Arab Emirates	Aug 29, 2014	449 days	
—	(Russia) Marat Gafurov def. Martin Nguyen for interim title	ONE: Odyssey of Champions; Jakarta, Indonesia	Sep 27, 2015	—	
4	(Russia) Marat Gafurov	ONE: Dynasty of Champions 3 Beijing, China	Nov 21, 2015	636 days	1. def. Kazunori Yokota at ONE: Kingdom of Champions on May 27, 2016; 2. def. Jadamba Narantungalag at ONE: Defending Honor on Nov 11, 2016
5	(Australia) Martin Nguyen	ONE: Quest for Greatness; Kuala Lumpur, Malaysia	Aug 18, 2017	1169 days	1. def. Christian Lee at ONE: Unstoppable Dreams on May 18, 2018.; 2. def. Jadamba Narantungalag at ONE: Roots of Honor on Apr 12, 2019; 3. def. Koyomi Matsushima at ONE: Dawn of Heroes on Aug 2, 2019
6	(United States) Thanh Le	ONE: Inside the Matrix; Kallang, Singapore	Oct 30, 2020	665 days	1. def. Garry Tonon at ONE: Lights Out on Mar 11, 2022
7	(China) Tang Kai	ONE 160; Kallang, Singapore	Aug 26, 2022	1547 days (incumbent)	1. def. Interim champion Thanh Le at ONE 166 on Mar 1, 2024; 2. def. Shamil Gasanov at ONE Fight Night 43 on May 16, 2026
—	(United States) Thanh Le def. Ilya Freymanov for interim title	ONE Fight Night 15; Bangkok, Thailand	Oct 7, 2023	—	
Kickboxing
No.	Name	Event	Date	Reign	Defenses
1	(Thailand) Superbon Singha Mawynn def. Giorgio Petrosyan	ONE: First Strike; Kallang, Singapore	Oct 15, 2021	456 days	1. def. Marat Grigorian on ONE: X at Mar 26, 2022
2	(Belarus) Chingiz Allazov	ONE Fight Night 6 Bangkok, Thailand	Jan 14, 2023	595 days	1. def. Marat Grigorian at ONE Fight Night 13 on Aug 5, 2023
—	(Thailand) Superbon Singha Mawynn def. Marat Grigorian for interim title	ONE Friday Fights 58; Bangkok, Thailand	Apr 5, 2024	—	
Allazov vacated the title on August 31, 2024, when he was released from his contract. Interim champion Superbon was officially promoted to undisputed champion on January 6, 2025.
3	(Thailand) Superbon Singha Mawynn (2) promoted to undisputed champion	–	Jan 6, 2025	683 days (incumbent)	1. def. Interim champion Masaaki Noiri at ONE 173 on Nov 15, 2025
–	(Japan) Masaaki Noiri def. Tawanchai P.K. Saenchai for interim title	ONE 172; Saitama, Japan	Mar 3, 2025	—	
Muay Thai
No.	Name	Event	Date	Reign	Defenses
1	(Thailand) Petchmorakot Petchyindee def. Pongsiri P.K. Saenchai	ONE: Warrior's Code; Jakarta, Indonesia	Feb 7, 2020	965 days	1. def. Yodsanklai Fairtex at ONE: No Surrender on Jul 31, 2020; 2. def. Magnus Andersson at ONE: A New Breed 3 on Sep 18, 2020; 3. def. Jimmy Vienot at ONE 157 on May 20, 2022
2	(Thailand) Tawanchai P.K. Saenchai	ONE 161; Kallang, Singapore	Sep 29, 2022	1391 days	1. def. Jamal Yusupov at ONE Fight Night 7 on Feb 25, 2023; 2. def. Superbon Singha Mawynn at ONE Friday Fights 46 on Dec 22, 2023; 3. def. Jo Nattawut at ONE 167 on Jun 7, 2024; 4. def. Superbon Singha Mawynn at ONE 170 on Jan 24, 2025
–	(Scotland) Nico Carrillo def. Shadow Singha Mawynn for interim title	ONE Fight Night 40; Bangkok, Thailand	Feb 14, 2026	—	
Tawanchai vacated the title on July 21, 2026, due to a leg injury.
3	(Scotland) Nico Carrillo promoted to undisputed champion	–	Jul 21, 2026	122 days (incumbent)	

=== Bantamweight World Championship ===
Weight limit: 145 lb (65.8 kg)

Mixed martial arts (MMA)
No.	Name	Event	Date	Reign	Defenses
1	(South Korea) Kim Soo-chul def. Leandro Issa	ONE FC: Rise of Kings; Kallang, Singapore	Oct 6, 2012	377 days	
—	(Brazil) Bibiano Fernandes def. Koetsu Okazaki for interim title	ONE FC: Rise to Power; Pasay, Philippines	May 31, 2013	—	
2	(Brazil) Bibiano Fernandes	ONE FC: Total Domination; Kallang, Singapore	Oct 18, 2013	1848 days	1. def. Masakatsu Ueda at ONE FC: Rise of Heroes on May 2, 2014; 2. def. Kim Dae-hwan at ONE FC: Warrior's Way on Dec 5, 2014; 3. def. Toni Tauru at ONE: Kingdom of Warriors on Jul 18, 2015; 4. def. Kevin Belingon at ONE: Dynasty of Champions (Changsha) on Jan 23, 2016; 5. def. Reece McLaren at ONE: Age of Domination on Dec 2, 2016; 6. def. Andrew Leone at ONE: Kings & Conquerors on Aug 5, 2017; 7. def. Martin Nguyen at ONE: Iron Will on Mar 24, 2018
—	(Philippines) Kevin Belingon def. Martin Nguyen for interim title	ONE: Reign of Kings; Pasay, Philippines	Jul 27, 2018	—	
3	(Philippines) Kevin Belingon	ONE: Heart of the Lion; Kallang, Singapore	Nov 9, 2018	142 days	
4	(Brazil) Bibiano Fernandes (2)	ONE: A New Era; Tokyo, Japan	Mar 31, 2019	1076 days	1. def. Kevin Belingon at ONE: Century − Part 2 on Oct 13, 2019
5	(Brazil) John Lineker	ONE: Lights Out; Kallang, Singapore	Mar 11, 2022	223 days	
Lineker was stripped of the title on October 20, 2022, after failing to make weight for his title defense against Fabrício Andrade at ONE on Prime Video 3.
6	(Brazil) Fabrício Andrade def. John Lineker	ONE Fight Night 7 Bangkok, Thailand	Feb 25, 2023	1015 days	1. def. Kwon Won-il at ONE 170 on Jan 24, 2025
7	(Mongolia) Enkh-Orgil Baatarkhuu	ONE Fight Night 38; Bangkok, Thailand	Dec 6, 2025	237 days	
8	(Azerbaijan) Elbek Alyshov	ONE: The Inner Circle 24; Bangkok, Thailand	Jul 31, 2026	112 days (incumbent)	
Kickboxing
No.	Name	Event	Date	Reign	Defenses
1	(Russia) Alaverdi Ramazanov def. Zhang Chenglong	ONE: Mark of Greatness; Kuala Lumpur, Malaysia	Dec 6, 2019	413 days	
2	(Thailand) Capitan Petchyindee	ONE: Unbreakable; Kallang, Singapore	Jan 22, 2021	428 days	1. def. Mehdi Zatout at ONE: Revolution on Sep 24, 2021
3	(Japan) Hiroki Akimoto	ONE: X Kallang, Singapore	Mar 26, 2022	238 days	
4	(Thailand) Petchtanong Petchfergus	ONE 163; Kallang, Singapore	Nov 19, 2022	249 days	
Petchtanong was stripped of the title on July 26, 2023, due to tested positive for both metenolone and noldenone, which is a banned substance according to International Doping Tests & Management.
5	(England) Jonathan Haggerty def. Fabrício Andrade	ONE Fight Night 16; Bangkok, Thailand	Nov 4, 2023	1112 days (incumbent)	1. def. Wei Rui at ONE 171 on Feb 20, 2025; 2. def. Yuki Yoza at ONE Samurai 1 on Apr 29, 2026; 3. def. Hiroki Akimoto at ONE Samurai 4 on Oct 17, 2026
Muay Thai
No.	Name	Event	Date	Reign	Defenses
1	(Thailand) Nong-O Gaiyanghadao def. Han Zihao	ONE: Clash of Legends; Bangkok, Thailand	Feb 16, 2019	1526 days	1. def. Hiroaki Suzuki at ONE: Warriors of Light on May 10, 2019; 2. def. Brice Delval at ONE: Immortal Triumph on Sep 6, 2019; 3. def. Saemapetch Fairtex at ONE: Edge Of Greatness on Nov 22, 2019; 4. def. Rodlek P.K. Saenchai at ONE: Collision Course on Dec 18, 2020; 5. def. Felipe Lobo at ONE: X on Mar 26, 2022; 6. def. Liam Harrison at ONE on Prime Video 1 on Aug 27, 2022; 7. def. Alaverdi Ramazanov at ONE Friday Fights 1 on Jan 20, 2023
2	(England) Jonathan Haggerty	ONE Fight Night 9 Bangkok, Thailand	Apr 22, 2023	503 days	1. def. Felipe Lobo at ONE Fight Night 19 on Feb 17, 2024
3	(Thailand) Superlek Kaitmuukao	ONE 168; Denver, CO, U.S.	Sep 6, 2024	183 days	
–	(France) Nabil Anane def. Nico Carrillo for interim title	ONE 170; Bangkok, Thailand	Jan 24, 2025	–	
Superlek was stripped of the title on March 22, 2025, after failing to hydration test for his title unification bout against Nabil Anane at ONE 172. Anane has officially promoted to undisputed champion during ONE Friday Fights 114 on June 27, 2025.
4	(France) Nabil Anane promoted to undisputed champion	–	Jun 27, 2025	266 days	
5	(Thailand) Rambolek Chor Ajalaboon	ONE: The Inner Circle 7 Bangkok, Thailand	Mar 20, 2026	174 days	
Rambolek was stripped of the title on September 10, 2026, after failing to hydration test for his title unification bout against Yod-IQ Or.Pimonsri at ONE: The Inner Circle 30.
6	(Thailand) Yod-Iq Or Pimolsri def. Rambolek Chor Ajalaboon	ONE: The Inner Circle 30; Bangkok, Thailand	Sep 11, 2026	70 days (incumbent)	

=== Flyweight World Championship ===
Weight limit: 135 lb (61.2 kg)

Mixed martial arts (MMA)
No.	Name	Event	Date	Reign	Defenses
1	(Brazil) Adriano Moraes def. Geje Eustaquio	ONE: Rise of the Kingdom; Phnom Penh, Cambodia	Sep 12, 2014	435 days	1. def. Riku Shibuya at ONE: Age of Champions on Mar 13, 2015
2	(Kazakhstan) Kairat Akhmetov	ONE: Dynasty of Champions 3 Beijing, China	Nov 21, 2015	623 days	
—	(Brazil) Adriano Moraes def. Tilek Batyrov for interim title	ONE: Heroes of the World; Macau, SAR, China	Aug 13, 2016	—	
3	(Brazil) Adriano Moraes (2)	ONE: Kings & Conquerors; Macau, SAR, China	Aug 5, 2017	322 days (757 days)	1. def. Danny Kingad at ONE: Legends of the World on Nov 10, 2017
—	(Philippines) Geje Eustaquio def. Kairat Akhmetov for interim title	ONE: Global Superheroes; Pasay, Philippines	Jan 26, 2018	—	
4	(Philippines) Geje Eustaquio	ONE: Pinnacle of Power; Beijing, China	Jun 23, 2018	216 days	
5	(Brazil) Adriano Moraes (3)	ONE: Hero's Ascent; Pasay, Philippines	Jan 25, 2019	1310 days (2067 days)	1. def. Demetrious Johnson at ONE on TNT 1 on Apr 7, 2021; 2. def. Yuya Wakamatsu at ONE: X on Mar 26, 2022
6	(United States) Demetrious Johnson	ONE on Prime Video 1 Kallang, Singapore	Aug 27, 2022	741 days	1. def. Adriano Moraes at ONE Fight Night 10 on May 5, 2023
Johnson announced his retirement from MMA during at ONE 168 on September 6, 2024.
7	(Japan) Yuya Wakamatsu def. Adriano Moraes	ONE 172; Saitama, Japan	Mar 23, 2025	402 days	1. def. Joshua Pacio at ONE 173 on Nov 16, 2025
8	(Uzbekistan) Avazbek Kholmirzaev	ONE Samurai 1 Tokyo, Japan	Apr 29, 2026	205 days (incumbent)	
Kickboxing
No.	Name	Event	Date	Reign	Defenses
1	(Thailand) Petchdam Petchyindee def. Elias Mahmoudi	ONE: Warriors of Light; Bangkok, Thailand	May 10, 2019	98 days	
2	(Netherlands) Ilias Ennahachi	ONE: Dreams of Gold; Bangkok, Thailand	Aug 16, 2019	1236 days	1. def. Wang Wenfeng at ONE: Age Of Dragons on Nov 16, 2019; 2. def. Superlek Kiatmuukao at ONE: Fists Of Fury on Feb 26, 2021
Ennahachi vacated the belt on January 3, 2023, due to his inability to make the flyweight limit of 135 pounds while hydrated.
3	(Thailand) Superlek Kiatmuukao def. Daniel Puertas Gallardo	ONE Fight Night 6 Bangkok, Thailand	Jan 14, 2023	1349 days	1. def. Danial Williams at ONE Fight Night 8 on Mar 25, 2023; 2. def. Takeru Segawa at ONE 165 on Jan 28, 2024
–	(Japan) Takeru Segawa def. Rodtang Jitmuangnon for interim title	ONE Samurai 1 Tokyo, Japan	Apr 29, 2026	205 days (incumbent)	
Superlek vacated the title on September 24, 2026, due to a knee injury.
Muay Thai
No.	Name	Event	Date	Reign	Defenses
1	(Thailand) Sam-A Gaiyanghadao def. Sergio Wielzen	ONE: Unstoppable Dreams; Kallang, Singapore	May 18, 2018	351 days	
2	(England) Jonathan Haggerty	ONE: For Honor; Jakarta, Indonesia	May 4, 2019	90 days	
3	(Thailand) Rodtang Jitmuangnon	ONE: Dawn of Heroes; Pasay, Philippines	Aug 2, 2019	1924 days	1. def. Walter Gonçalves at ONE: Century − Part 2 on Oct 13, 2019; 2. def. Jonathan Haggerty at ONE: A New Tomorrow on Jan 10, 2020; 3. def. Petchdam Petchyindee at ONE: No Surrender on Jul 31, 2020; 4. def. Joseph Lasiri at ONE on Prime Video 4 on Nov 19, 2022; 5. def. Edgar Tabares at ONE Fight Night 10 on May 5, 2023
Rodtang was stripped of the title on November 7, 2024, after failing to make weight and failing his hydration test for his title defense against Jacob Smith at ONE 169.
4	(Russia) Asadula Imangazaliev def. Aslamjon Ortikov	ONE: The Inner Circle 20; Bangkok, Thailand	Jun 26, 2026	147 days (incumbent)	1. def. Aslamjon Ortikov at ONE: The Inner Circle 39 on Nov 20, 2026
Submission grappling
No.	Name	Event	Date	Reign	Defenses
1	(United States) Mikey Musumeci def. Cleber Souza	ONE on Prime Video 2 Kallang, Singapore	Oct 1, 2022	705 days	1. def. Gantumur Bayanduuren at ONE Fight Night 6 on Jan 14, 2023; 2. def. Osamah Almarwai at ONE Fight Night 10 on May 5, 2023; 3. def. Jarred Brooks at ONE Fight Night 13 on August 5, 2023
Musumeci was stripped of the title on September 5, 2024, after failing to make weight for his title defense against Bebeto Oliveira at ONE 168.
2	(Brazil) Diogo Reis def. Daiki Yonekura	ONE Fight Night 38; Bangkok, Thailand	Dec 6, 2025	350 days (incumbent)	

=== Strawweight World Championship ===
Weight limit: 125 lb (56.7 kg)

Mixed martial arts (MMA)
No.	Name	Event	Date	Reign	Defenses
1	(Thailand) Dejdamrong Sor Amnuaysirichoke def. Roy Doliguez	ONE: Warrior's Quest; Kallang, Singapore	May 22, 2015	371 days	
2	(Japan) Yoshitaka Naito	ONE: Kingdom of Champions; Bangkok, Thailand	May 27, 2016	561 days	1. def. Joshua Pacio at ONE: State of Warriors on Oct 7, 2016
3	(Brazil) Alex Silva	ONE: Warriors of the World; Bangkok, Thailand	Dec 9, 2017	154 days	
4	(Japan) Yoshitaka Naito (2)	ONE: Grits And Glory; Jakarta, Indonesia	May 12, 2018	133 days (694 days)	
5	(Philippines) Joshua Pacio	ONE: Conquest of Heroes; Jakarta, Indonesia	Sep 22, 2018	119 days	
6	(Japan) Yosuke Saruta	ONE: Eternal Glory; Jakarta, Indonesia	Jan 19, 2019	83 days	
7	(Philippines) Joshua Pacio (2)	ONE: Roots of Honor; Pasay, Philippines	Apr 12, 2019	1331 days (1450 days)	1. def. Rene Catalan at ONE: Masters Of Fate on Nov 8, 2019; 2. def. Alex Silva at ONE: Fire & Fury on Jan 31, 2020; 3. def. Yosuke Saruta at ONE: Revolution on Sep 24, 2021
8	(United States) Jarred Brooks	ONE 164; Pasay, Philippines	Dec 3, 2022	454 days	
9	(Philippines) Joshua Pacio (3)	ONE 166; Lusail, Qatar	Mar 1, 2024	994 days (incumbent)	1. def. Interim champion Jarred Brooks at ONE 171: Qatar on Feb 20, 2025; 2. def. Mansur Malachiev at ONE: The Inner Circle 21 on Jul 10, 2026; 3. def. Keito Yamakita at ONE Samurai 5 on Nov 18, 2026
—	(United States) Jarred Brooks def. Gustavo Balart for interim title	ONE Fight Night 24; Bangkok, Thailand	Aug 3, 2024	—	
Kickboxing
No.	Name	Event	Date	Reign	Defenses
1	(Thailand) Sam-A Gaiyanghadao def. Wang Junguang	ONE: Mark Of Greatness; Kuala Lumpur, Malaysia	Dec 6, 2019	806 days	
Sam-A vacated the title on February 19, 2022 due to retirement.
2	(Canada) Jonathan Di Bella def. Zhang Peimian	ONE 162; Kuala Lumpur, Malaysia	Oct 21, 2022	531 days	1. def. Danial Williams at ONE Fight Night 15 on Oct 7, 2023
Di Bella was stripped of the title on April 4, 2024, after failing to make hydration for his title defense against Prajanchai P.K. Saenchai at ONE Friday Fights 58. He was stripped of his title after failing to meet the required hydration levels at the weigh-ins.
3	(Thailand) Prajanchai P.K. Saenchai def. Jonathan Di Bella	ONE Friday Fights 68; Bangkok, Thailand	Jun 28, 2024	463 days	
—	(Canada) Jonathan Di Bella def. Sam-A Gaiyanghadao for interim title	ONE 172; Saitama, Japan	Mar 23, 2025	–	
4	(Canada) Jonathan Di Bella (2)	ONE Fight Night 36; Bangkok, Thailand	Oct 4, 2025	412 days (incumbent)	1. def. Zhang Peimian at ONE: The Inner Circle 22 on Jul 17, 2026
Muay Thai
No.	Name	Event	Date	Reign	Defenses
1	(Thailand) Sam-A Gaiyanghadao def. Rocky Ogden	ONE: King of the Jungle; Kallang, Singapore	Feb 28, 2020	518 days	1. def. Josh Tonna at ONE: Reign of Dynasties on Oct 9, 2020
2	(Thailand) Prajanchai P.K. Saenchai	ONE: Battleground; Kallang, Singapore	Jul 30, 2021	294 days	
3	(Italy) Joseph Lasiri	ONE 157; Kallang, Singapore	May 20, 2022	581 days	
—	(Thailand) Prajanchai P.K. Saenchai def. Sam-A Gaiyanghadao for interim title	ONE Friday Fights 22; Bangkok, Thailand	Jun 23, 2023	—	
4	(Thailand) Prajanchai P.K. Saenchai (2)	ONE Friday Fights 46; Bangkok, Thailand	Dec 22, 2023	1064 days (incumbent)	1. def. Ellis Barboza at ONE Fight Night 28 on Feb 7, 2025
—	(Malaysia) Aliff Sor.Dechapan def. Sam-A Gaiyanghadao for interim title	ONE: The Inner Circle 23; Bangkok, Thailand	Jul 24, 2026	—	

=== Atomweight World Championship ===
Weight limit: 115 lb (52.2 kg)

Muay Thai
No.	Name	Event	Date	Reign	Defenses
1	(Japan) Nadaka Yoshinari def. Numsurin Chor Ketwina	ONE 173; Tokyo, Japan	Nov 16, 2025	369 days (incumbent)	1. def. Songchainoi Kiatsongrit at ONE Samurai 1 on Apr 29, 2026; 2. def. Rifdean Masdor at ONE Samurai 4 on Oct 17, 2026

== Women's championship history ==
=== Women's Strawweight World Championship ===
Weight limit: 125 lb (56.7 kg)

Mixed martial arts (MMA)
No.	Name	Event	Date	Reign	Defenses
1	(China) Xiong Jing Nan def. Tiffany Teo	ONE: Kings of Courage; Jakarta, Indonesia	Jan 20, 2018	2987 days	1. def. Laura Balin at ONE: Pinnacle of Power on Jun 23, 2018; 2. def. Samara Santos at ONE: Beyond the Horizon on Sep 8, 2018; 3. def. Angela Lee at ONE: A New Era on Mar 31, 2019; 4. def. Tiffany Teo at ONE: Inside the Matrix on Oct 3, 2020; 5. def. Michelle Nicolini at ONE: Empower on Sep 3, 2021; 6. def. Ayaka Miura at ONE: Heavy Hitters on Jan 14, 2022; 7. def. Angela Lee at ONE on Prime Video 2 on Oct 1, 2022
On March 26, 2026, it was announced that the Women's Strawweight MMA division was being discontinued.
Kickboxing
1	(United States) Jackie Buntan def. Anissa Meksen	ONE 169; Bangkok, Thailand	Nov 9, 2024	462 days	
2	(Austria) Stella Hemetsberger def. Jackie Buntan	ONE Fight Night 40; Bangkok, Thailand	Feb 14, 2026	279 days (incumbent)	
Muay Thai
1	(Sweden) Smilla Sundell def. Jackie Buntan	ONE 156; Kallang, Singapore	Apr 22, 2022	741 days	1. def. Allycia Rodrigues at ONE Fight Night 14 on Sep 30, 2023
Sundell was stripped of the title on May 2, 2024, after failing to make weight for her title defense against Natalia Diachkova at ONE Fight Night 22.
2	(Austria) Stella Hemetsberger def. Jackie Buntan	ONE Fight Night 35; Bangkok, Thailand	Sept 6, 2025	440 days (incumbent)	1. def. Natalia Diachkova at ONE Fight Night 46 on Aug 15, 2026

=== Women's Atomweight World Championship ===
Weight limit: 115 lb (52.2 kg)

Mixed martial arts (MMA)
No.	Name	Event	Date	Reign	Defenses
1	(United States) Angela Lee def. Mei Yamaguchi	ONE: Ascent to Power; Kallang, Singapore	May 6, 2016	2703 days	1. def. Jenny Huang at ONE: Warrior Kingdom on Mar 11, 2017; 2. def. Istela Nunes at ONE: Dynasty of Heroes on May 26, 2017; 3. def. Mei Yamaguchi at ONE: Unstoppable Dreams on May 18, 2018; 4. def. Xiong Jing Nan at ONE: Century − Part 1 on Oct 13, 2019; 5. def. Stamp Fairtex at ONE: X on Mar 26, 2022
Lee vacated the title on September 30, 2023 due to retirement from MMA at ONE Fight Night 14.
2	(Thailand) Stamp Fairtex def. Ham Seo-hee	ONE Fight Night 14; Kallang, Singapore	Sep 30, 2023	580 days	
—	(Philippines) Denice Zamboanga def. Alyona Rassohyna for interim title	ONE Fight Night 27; Bangkok, Thailand	Jan 11, 2025	—	
Stamp vacated the title on May 2, 2025, due to a knee injury.
3	(Philippines) Denice Zamboanga promoted to undisputed champion	—	May 2, 2025	417 days	
Zamboanga vacated the title on June 23, 2026, following the birth of her child.
Kickboxing
No.	Name	Event	Date	Reign	Defenses
1	(Taiwan) Chuang Kai Ting def. Yodcherry Sityodtong	ONE: Battle for the Heavens; Guangzhou, China	Jul 7, 2018	91 days	
2	(Thailand) Stamp Fairtex	ONE: Kingdom of Heroes; Bangkok, Thailand	Oct 6, 2018	510 days	
3	(United States) Janet Todd	ONE: King of the Jungle; Kallang, Singapore	Feb 28, 2020	1471 days	
—	(Thailand) Phetjeeja Lukjaoporongtom def. Anissa Meksen for interim title	ONE Friday Fights 46; Bangkok, Thailand	Dec 22, 2023	—	
4	(Thailand) Phetjeeja Lukjaoporongtom	ONE Fight Night 20; Bangkok, Thailand	Mar 9, 2024	986 days (incumbent)	1. def. Kana Morimoto at ONE 172 on March 23, 2025
Muay Thai
No.	Name	Event	Date	Reign	Defenses
1	(Thailand) Stamp Fairtex def. Janet Todd	ONE: Call to Greatness; Kallang, Singapore	Feb 22, 2019	553 days	1. def. Alma Juniku at ONE: Legendary Quest on Jun 15, 2019
2	(Brazil) Allycia Rodrigues	ONE: A New Breed; Bangkok, Thailand	Aug 28, 2020	2275 days (incumbent)	1. def. interim champion Janet Todd at ONE Fight Night 8 on Mar 25, 2023; 2. def. Cristina Morales at ONE Fight Night 20 on Mar 9, 2024; 3. def. Marie McManamon at ONE Fight Night 29 on Mar 8, 2025; 4. def. Johanna Persson at ONE Fight Night 33 on Jul 12, 2025; 5. def. Phetjeeja Lukjaoporongtom at The Inner Circle 19 on Jun 19, 2026
—	(United States) Janet Todd def. Lara Fernandez for interim title	ONE 159; Kallang, Singapore	Jul 22, 2022	—	
Submission grappling
No.	Name	Event	Date	Reign	Defenses
1	(United States) Danielle Kelly def. Jessa Khan	ONE Fight Night 14; Kallang, Singapore	Sep 30, 2023	308 days	
2	(Brazil) Mayssa Bastos	ONE Fight Night 24; Bangkok, Thailand	Aug. 3, 2024	839 days (incumbent)	1. def. Danielle Kelly at ONE Fight Night 26 on Dec 6th, 2024
Atomweight Submission grappling title was scrapped

== Tournament winners ==
Event	Date	Division	Winner	Runner-up
ONE FC: Rise to Power	May 31, 2013	Bantamweight	(Japan) Masakatsu Ueda	(Philippines) Kevin Belingon
ONE FC: Warrior Spirit	Nov 15, 2013	Malaysia Featherweight	(Malaysia) A.J. Lias Mansor	(Malaysia) Melvin Yeoh
ONE FC: Rise of the Kingdom	Sep 12, 2014	Cambodia Featherweight	(Cambodia) Samang Dun	(Cambodia) Chan Rothana
ONE FC: Dynasty of Champions	Dec 19, 2014	Beijing Featherweight	(China) Li Kaiwen	(China) Wang Yawei
ONE FC: Dynasty of Champions	Dec 19, 2014	Beijing Flyweight	(China) Li Weibin	(China) Wang Wei
ONE: Dynasty of Champions 2	Jun 20, 2015	Guangzhou Featherweight	(China) Huang Diyuan	(China) Ma Jiawen
ONE: Dynasty of Champions 2	Jun 20, 2015	Guangzhou Flyweight	(China) Wu Ze	(China) Yang Jianbing
ONE: Kingdom of Warriors	Jul 18, 2015	Myanmar Featherweight	(Myanmar) Tha Pyay Nyo	(Myanmar) Myo Man Thit
ONE: Kingdom of Warriors	Jul 18, 2015	Myanmar Lightweight	(Myanmar) Thway Thit Aung	(Myanmar) Saw Ba Oo
ONE: Dynasty of Champions 3	Nov 21, 2015	Beijing Featherweight Tournament	(China) Yang Sen	(China) Zhang Jiacai
ONE: Dynasty of Champions 4	Jan 23, 2016	Changsha Bantamweight	(China) Ma Haobin	(China) Huoyou Gabu
ONE: Dynasty of Champions 6	Jul 2, 2016	Hefei Flyweight	(China) Huoyou Gabu	(China) Li Haojie
ONE: State of Warriors	Oct 7, 2016	Myanmar Featherweight	(Myanmar) Phoe Thaw	(Myanmar) Saw Yan Paing
ONE: Light of a Nation	Jun 30, 2017	Myanmar Flyweight	(Myanmar) Saw Min Min	(Myanmar) Shwe Kyaung Thar
ONE: Century – Part 1	Oct 13, 2019	Lightweight	(United States) Christian Lee	(Turkey) Saygid Guseyn Arslanaliev
ONE: Century – Part 1	Oct 13, 2019	Flyweight	(United States) Demetrious Johnson	(Philippines) Danny Kingad
ONE: Century – Part 2	Oct 13, 2019	Featherweight Kickboxing	(Italy) Giorgio Petrosyan	(France) Samy Sana
ONE: A New Breed	Aug 28, 2020	Bantamweight Muay Thai	(Thailand) Rodlek P.K.Saenchai	(Thailand) Kulabdam Sor Jor Piek-U-Thai
ONE: Winter Warriors	Dec 3, 2021	Women's Atomweight	(Thailand) Stamp Fairtex	(India) Ritu Phogat
ONE: X	Mar 26, 2022	Featherweight Kickboxing	(Belarus) Chingiz Allazov	(Thailand) Sitthichai Sitsongpeenong
ONE 163	Nov 19, 2022	Heavyweight Kickboxing	(Ukraine) Roman Kryklia	(Iran) Iraj Azizpour

== Records ==
=== Most wins in title bouts ===
Title wins	Champion	Weight class	W	D	NC	L
11	(Brazil) Bibiano Fernandes	Bantamweight of MMA	11	0	0	2
11	(Suriname) Regian Eersel	Lightweight of Kickboxing; Lightweight of Muay Thai	7; 4	0; 0	0; 0	1; 0
8	(Brazil) Adriano Moraes	Flyweight of MMA	8	0	0	4
8	(China) Xiong Jing Nan	Women's Strawweight of MMA; Women's Atomweight of MMA	8; 0	0; 0	0; 0	0; 1
8	(Thailand) Nong-O Gaiyanghadao	Bantamweight of Muay Thai	8	0	0	1
6	(Myanmar) Aung La Nsang	Light Heavyweight of MMA; Middleweight of MMA	2; 4	0; 0	0; 0	1; 2
6	(United States) Angela Lee	Women's Strawweight of MMA; Women's Atomweight of MMA	0; 6	0; 0	0; 0	2; 0
6	(Thailand) Rodtang Jitmuangnon	Flyweight of Muay Thai	6	0	0	0
5	(Australia) Martin Nguyen	Lightweight of MMA; Featherweight of MMA; Bantamweight of MMA	1; 4; 0	0; 0; 0	0; 0; 0	0; 2; 2
5	(Philippines) Joshua Pacio	Strawweight of MMA	5	0	0	3
5	(United States) Christian Lee	Welterweight of MMA; Lightweight of MMA; Featherweight of MMA	1; 4; 0	0; 0; 0	0; 0; 0	0; 1; 1
4	(Russia) Anatoly Malykhin	Heavyweight of MMA; Light Heavyweight of MMA; Middleweight of MMA	2; 1; 1	0; 0; 0	0; 0; 0	1; 0; 0
4	(Japan) Shinya Aoki	Welterweight of MMA; Lightweight of MMA	0; 4	0; 0	0; 0	1; 2
4	(Thailand) Sam-A Gaiyanghadao	Strawweight of Kickboxing; Flyweight of Muay Thai; Strawweight of Muay Thai	1; 1; 2	0; 0; 0	0; 0; 0	0; 1; 1
4	(Russia) Marat Gafurov	Featherweight of MMA	4	0	0	1
4	(United States) Ben Askren	Welterweight of MMA	4	0	1	0
4	(Netherlands) Reinier de Ridder	Light Heavyweight of MMA; Middleweight of MMA	1; 3	0; 0	0; 0	1; 1
4	(Thailand) Petchmorakot Petchyindee	Featherweight of Muay Thai	4	0	0	1
4	(United States) Mikey Musumeci	Flyweight of Submission grappling	4	0	0	0

=== Most consecutive title defenses ===
Defenses	Champion	Division	Period
7	(Brazil) Bibiano Fernandes	Bantamweight of MMA	October 13, 2013 — July 27, 2018
7	(China) Xiong Jing Nan	Women's Strawweight of MMA	January 20, 2018 — present
7	(Thailand) Nong-O Gaiyanghadao	Bantamweight of Muay Thai	February 16, 2019 — April 22, 2023
5	(United States) Angela Lee	Women's Atomweight of MMA	May 6, 2016 — September 30, 2023
5	(Thailand) Rodtang Jitmuangnon	Flyweight of Muay Thai	August 2, 2019 — November 7, 2024
4	(Suriname) Regian Eersel	Lightweight of Kickboxing	May 17, 2019 — present
3	(United States) Ben Askren	Welterweight of MMA	August 29, 2014 — October 24, 2018
3	(Myanmar) Aung La Nsang	Middleweight of MMA	June 30, 2017 — October 30, 2020
3	(Australia) Martin Nguyen	Featherweight of MMA	August 18, 2017 — October 30, 2020
3	(Thailand) Petchmorakot Petchyindee	Featherweight of Muay Thai	February 7, 2020 — September 29, 2022
3	(Philippines) Joshua Pacio	Strawweight of MMA	April 12, 2019 — December 3, 2022
3	(United States) Mikey Musumeci	Flyweight of Submission Grappling	October 1, 2022 — September 5, 2024

=== Multi-division champions ===
Interim title

No.	Champion	Division	Won	Lost	Defenses	Reign	Total Reign
1	(Australia) Martin Nguyen	Lightweight of MMA	November 10, 2017 (ONE: Legends of the World)	September 28, 2018 (Stripped)	0	322 days	1491 days
1	(Australia) Martin Nguyen	Featherweight of MMA	August 18, 2017 (ONE: Quest for Greatness)	October 30, 2020 (ONE: Inside the Matrix)	3	1169 days	1491 days
2	(Myanmar) Aung La Nsang	Light Heavyweight of MMA	February 23, 2018 (ONE: Quest for Gold)	April 28, 2021 (ONE on TNT 4)	1	1161 days	2379 days
2	(Myanmar) Aung La Nsang	Middleweight of MMA	June 30, 2017 (ONE: Light of a Nation)	October 30, 2020 (ONE: Inside the Matrix)	3	1218 days	2379 days
3	(Thailand) Sam-A Gaiyanghadao	Strawweight of Kickboxing	December 6, 2019 (ONE: Mark Of Greatness)	February 19, 2022 (Retirement)	0	806 days	1674 days
3	(Thailand) Sam-A Gaiyanghadao	Flyweight of Muay Thai	May 18, 2018 (ONE: Unstoppable Dreams)	May 4, 2019 (ONE: For Honor)	0	350 days	1674 days
3	(Thailand) Sam-A Gaiyanghadao	Strawweight of Muay Thai	February 28, 2020 (ONE: King of the Jungle)	30 July 2021 (ONE: Battleground)	1	518 days	1674 days
4	(Thailand) Stamp Fairtex	Women's Atomweight of Kickboxing	October 6, 2018 (ONE: Kingdom of Heroes)	February 28, 2020 (ONE: King of the Jungle)	0	510 days	1063 days
4	(Thailand) Stamp Fairtex	Women's Atomweight of Muay Thai	February 22, 2019 (ONE: Call to Greatness)	August 28, 2020 (ONE: A New Breed)	1	553 days	1063 days
5	(Netherlands) Reinier de Ridder	Light Heavyweight of MMA	April 28, 2021 (ONE on TNT 4)	December 3, 2022 (ONE on Prime Video 5)	0	584 days	4244 days
5	(Netherlands) Reinier de Ridder	Middleweight of MMA	October 30, 2020 (ONE: Inside the Matrix)	March 1, 2024 (ONE 166)	2	2212 days	4244 days
6	(Suriname) Regian Eersel	Lightweight of Muay Thai	October 22, 2022 (ONE on Prime Video 3)	Present	3	1490 days	4234 days
6	(Suriname) Regian Eersel	Lightweight of Kickboxing	May 17, 2019 (ONE: Enter the Dragon)	Present	4	2744 days	4234 days
7	(United States) Christian Lee	Welterweight of MMA	November 19, 2022 (ONE on Prime Video 4)	Present	0	1462 days	3870 days
7	(United States) Christian Lee	Lightweight of MMA	August 26, 2022 (ONE 160)	Present	0	1547 days	3870 days
7	(United States) Christian Lee	Lightweight of MMA	May 17, 2019 (ONE: Enter the Dragon)	September 24, 2021 (ONE: Revolution)	2	861 days	3870 days
8	(England) Jonathan Haggerty	Bantamweight of Muay Thai	April 22, 2023 (ONE Fight Night 9)	September 7, 2024 (ONE 168)	0	504 days	1398 days
8	(England) Jonathan Haggerty	Flyweight of Muay Thai	May 4, 2019 (ONE: For Honor)	August 2, 2019 (ONE: Dawn of Heroes)	0	90 days	1398 days
9	(Russia) Anatoly Malykhin	Heavyweight of MMA	June 23, 2023 (ONE Friday Fights 22)	November 9, 2024 (ONE 169)	0	505 days	4185 days
9	(Russia) Anatoly Malykhin	Heavyweight of MMA	February 11, 2022 (ONE: Bad Blood)	June 23, 2023 (ONE Friday Fights 22)	0	497 days	4185 days
9	(Russia) Anatoly Malykhin	Light Heavyweight of MMA	December 3, 2022 (ONE on Prime Video 5)	Present	0	1448 days	4185 days
9	(Russia) Anatoly Malykhin	Middleweight of MMA	March 1, 2024 (ONE 166)	Present	0	994 days	4185 days
10	(Thailand) Prajanchai P.K.Saenchai	Strawweight of Muay Thai	December 22, 2023 (ONE: Friday Fights 46)	Present	0	1064 days	1939 days
10	(Thailand) Prajanchai P.K.Saenchai	Strawweight of Kickboxing	June 28, 2024 (ONE Friday Fights 68)	Present	0	875 days	1939 days

=== Simultaneous two division champions ===
This table, different from the previous one, only counts the periods in which the fighter loaded the titles simultaneously and the defenses in that period of time.

No.	Champion	Division	Span	Defenses	Simultaneous Reign
1	(Australia) Martin Nguyen	Lightweight of MMA	November 10, 2017 — September 28, 2018	0	322 days
1	(Australia) Martin Nguyen	Featherweight of MMA	November 10, 2017 — September 28, 2018	1	322 days
2	(Myanmar) Aung La Nsang	Light Heavyweight of MMA	February 23, 2018 — October 30, 2020	1	980 days
2	(Myanmar) Aung La Nsang	Middleweight of MMA	February 23, 2018 — October 30, 2020	3	980 days
3	(Thailand) Sam-A Gaiyanghadao	Strawweight of Kickboxing	February 28, 2020 — July 30, 2021	0	518 days
3	(Thailand) Sam-A Gaiyanghadao	Strawweight of Muay Thai	February 28, 2020 — July 30, 2021	1	518 days
4	(Thailand) Stamp Fairtex	Women's Atomweight of Kickboxing	February 22, 2019 — February 28, 2020	0	371 days
4	(Thailand) Stamp Fairtex	Women's Atomweight of Muay Thai	February 22, 2019 — February 28, 2020	1	371 days
5	(Netherlands) Reinier de Ridder	Light Heavyweight of MMA	April 28, 2021 — December 3, 2022	0	584 days
5	(Netherlands) Reinier de Ridder	Middleweight of MMA	April 28, 2021 — December 3, 2022	2	584 days
6	(Suriname) Regian Eersel	Lightyweight of Muay Thai	October 22, 2022 — present	2	1,490 days
6	(Suriname) Regian Eersel	Lightweight of Kickboxing	October 22, 2022 — present	4	1,490 days
7	(United States) Christian Lee	Welteryweight of MMA	November 19, 2022 — present	0	1,463 days
7	(United States) Christian Lee	Lightweight of MMA	November 19, 2022 — present	0	1,463 days
7	(Russia) Anatoly Malykhin	Heavyweight of MMA	June 23, 2023 — November 9, 2024	0	505 days
7	(Russia) Anatoly Malykhin	Light Heavyweight of MMA	June 23, 2023 — November 9, 2024	0	505 days
8	(England) Jonathan Haggerty	Bantamweight of Muay Thai	November 4, 2023 — present	0	1,112 days
8	(England) Jonathan Haggerty	Bantamweight of Kickboxing	November 4, 2023 — present	0	1,112 days
9	(Ukraine) Roman Kryklia	Light Heavyweight of Kickboxing	December 8, 2023 — present	0	1,078 days
9	(Ukraine) Roman Kryklia	Heavyweight of Muay Thai	December 8, 2023 — present	0	1,078 days

=== Champions by nationality ===
Fighters with multiple title reigns in a specific division are only counted once. Interim champions who never became linear champions are only listed in parentheses.

Country	MMA	Kickboxing	Muay Thai	Submission Grappling	Tournament	Total (LC only)
Thailand	2	9	11	0	2	22
United States	9	1	1 (1)	4	2	15
Brazil	6	0	1	2	0	9
Japan	6	1 (2)	1	0	1	8
Russia	5	1	1	0	0	7
Philippines	6	0	0	0	0	6
South Korea	3	0	0	0	0	3
Netherlands	2	1	0	0	0	3
Ukraine	0	2	1	0	1	3
England	0	1	2	0	0	3
China	2	0	0	0	7	2
Myanmar	2	0	0	0	4	2
Australia	2	0	0	0	0	2
Mongolia	2	0	0	0	0	2
Kazakhstan	2	0	0	0	0	2
Canada	1	1	0	0	0	2
Sweden	1	0	1	0	0	2
Suriname	0	1	1	0	0	2
France	0	1	1	0	0	2
Austria	0	1	1	0	0	2
Belarus	0	1	0	0	1	1
Italy	0	0	1	0	1	1
Senegal	1	0	0	0	0	1
Kyrgyzstan	1	0	0	0	0	1
Uzbekistan	1	0	0	0	0	1
Azerbaijan	1	0	0	0	0	1
Taiwan	0	1	0	0	0	1
Turkey	0	1	0	0	0	1
Scotland	0	0	1	0	0	1
Malaysia	0	0	0 (1)	0	1	0
Cambodia	0	0	0	0	1	0

== Missed weight/Failed hydration title fights ==
Throughout the history of ONE Championship, there has been multiple instances of champions or title challengers missing weight, or failing hydration tests. These are the official fights that still happened after the fails.

Event	Date	Championship	Result			Notes
ONE: Global Rivals	Apr 15, 2016	Welterweight	(United States) Ben Askren (c) (170 lb)	def.	(Russia) Nikolay Aleksakhin (187 lb)	Aleksakhin missed weight, and the contest was switched to a catchweight (188 lb) non-title bout.
ONE on Prime Video 3	Oct 21, 2022	Bantamweight MMA	(Brazil) John Lineker ~~(c)~~ (145.75 lb)	vs.	(Brazil) Fabrício Andrade (145 lb)	Lineker was stripped of the title, and only Andrade was eligible to win title. The fight ended in a no contest.
ONE on Prime Video 3	Oct 21, 2022	Lightweight Submission Grappling	(United States) Kade Ruotolo (169 lb)	def.	(Russia) Uali Kurzhev (hydration test failed at 1.0274)	The match was scheduled at 170 lb for the inaugural ONE Lightweight Submission Grappling World Championship. Kurzhev failed his hydration test, and the bout was changed to a 174 lb catchweight match. Only Ruotolo was eligible to win the title.
ONE on Prime Video 4	Nov 19, 2022	Middleweight MMA	(United States) Christian Lee (185 lb)	def.	(Russia) Kiamrian Abbasov ~~(c)~~ (186.25 lbs)	Abbasov was stripped of the title, and only Lee was eligible to win the title.
ONE Friday Fights 34	September 22, 2023	Flyweight Muay Thai	(Thailand) Superlek Kiatmuukao (140 lb)	def.	(Thailand) Rodtang Jitmuangnon (135 lb)	The bout was originally contested for the ONE Flyweight Muay Thai World Championship. The bout was switched over to a three-round catchweight (140 lb) fight.
ONE Fight Night 22	May 4, 2024	Women’s Strawweight Muay Thai	(Sweden) Smilla Sundell ~~(c)~~ (126.5 lb)	def.	(Russia) Natalia Diachkova (125 lb)	Sundell was stripped of the title, and only Diachkova was eligible to win the title.
ONE Fight Night 24	August 2, 2024	Strawweight MMA	(United States) Jarred Brooks (123.25 lb)	def.	(Cuba) Gustavo Balart (126 lb)	The fight was scheduled for the interim ONE Strawweight MMA World Championship. The bout was changed to a 126 lb catchweight limit. Only Brooks was eligible to win the title.
ONE 169	Nov 8, 2024	Flyweight Muay Thai	(Thailand) Rodtang Jitmuangnon ~~(c)~~ (135.5 lb) (hydration test failed at 1.0241)	def.	(England) Jacob Smith (135 lb)	Rodtang was stripped of the title, and only Smith was eligible to win the title.
ONE 172	Mar 23, 2025	Bantamweight Muay Thai	(France) Nabil Anane (144.75 lb)	def.	(Thailand) Superlek Kiatmuukao ~~(c)~~ (146.75 lb) (failed hydration test at 1.0237)	Superlek was stripped of the title, and the bout was changed to a non-title contest. Anane was the concurrent interim Bantamweight Muay Thai champion before this fight, and he was promoted to undisputed champion in May of 2025.
ONE Fight Night 30	Apr 5, 2025	Lightweight Kickboxing	(Suriname) Regian Eersel ~~(c)~~ (168.5 lb) (failed his hydration test at 1.0270)	def.	(France) Alexis Nicolas (168.75 lb)	Eersel was stripped of the title, and only Nicolas was eligible to win the title.
ONE Friday Fights 147	Mar 20, 2026	Flyweight Muay Thai	(Russia) Asadula Imangazaliev (139.8 lb) (failed hydration test at 1.0270)	def.	(Thailand) Nong-O Hama (134 lb)	Title was vacant before the fight. Imangazaliev missed weight and failed his hydration test, and the contest was changed to catchweight limit. Only Nong-O was available to win the title.
ONE: The Inner Circle 30	Sep 11, 2026	Bantamweight Muay Thai	(Thailand) Yod-Iq Or Pimolsri (144.8 lb)	def.	(Thailand) Rambolek Chor Ajalaboon ~~(c)~~ (145.6 lb)	Rambolek was stripped of the title, and only Yod-IQ was eligible to win the title.
ONE Samurai 4	Oct 17, 2026	Atomweight Muay Thai	(Japan) Nadaka Yoshinari (c) (114.8 lb)	def.	(Malaysia) Rifdean Masdor (118.6 lb) (failed hydration test at 1.0303)	Masdor missed weight and failed his hydration test, and the contest was changed to catchweight limit, Only Yoshinari was eligible to win the title.

== See also ==
- List of current mixed martial arts champions
- List of Bellator MMA champions
- List of EliteXC champions
- List of Invicta FC champions
- List of Pride champions
- List of PFL champions
- List of Strikeforce champions
- List of UFC champions
- List of WEC champions
- Mixed martial arts weight classes
