= ONE Fight Night 7 =

Combat sport events in 2023

ONE Fight Night 7: Lineker vs. Andrade 2
- The poster for ONE Fight Night 7: Lineker vs. Andrade 2
- Promotion: ONE Championship
- Date: February 25, 2023
- Venue: Lumpinee Boxing Stadium
- City: Bangkok, Thailand

Event chronology
ONE Friday Fights 6: Gingsanglek vs. Kongthoranee	ONE Fight Night 7: Lineker vs. Andrade 2	ONE Friday Fights 7: Rambolek vs. Teeradech

ONE Fight Night 7: Lineker vs. Andrade 2 was a Combat sport event produced by ONE Championship that took place on February 25, 2023, at Lumpinee Boxing Stadium in Bangkok, Thailand.

== Background ==
The event was originally scheduled on February 11 at Jakarta Convention Center in Jakarta, Indonesia to host the event. However, the event was moved to Lumpinee Boxing Stadium in Bangkok, Thailand and took place on February 25.

A ONE Bantamweight World Championship rematch for the vacant title between former champion John Lineker and #1 ranked contender Fabrício Andrade served as the event headliner. The pairing previously met at ONE on Prime Video 3 in October 2022, Lineker was stripped of the title when he missed weight for his attempted title defense, where the bout ended in a no contest due to an accidental groin strike rendered Lineker unable to continue during the third round.

A ONE Featherweight Muay Thai World Championship bout between current champion Tawanchai P.K.Saenchai and Jamal Yusupov served as the event's co-headliner.

A featherweight bout between former ONE Featherweight and Lightweight World Champion Martin Nguyen and Shamil Gasanov was scheduled for this event. However, Gasanov was forced to withdraw due to an infection that stemmed from an injury. He was replaced by promotional newcomer Razhab Shaydullaev. In turn, Shaydullaev was forced to withdraw due to undisclosed reasons and was replaced by Leonardo Casotti.

== Results ==
Main card (Amazon Prime Video)
Weight class				Method	Round	Time	Notes
Bantamweight	Fabrício Andrade	def.	John Lineker	TKO (corner stoppage)	4	5:00	(Note: For the vacant ONE Bantamweight World Championship.)
Featherweight Muay Thai	Tawanchai P.K.Saenchai (c)	def.	Jamal Yusupov	KO (leg kick)	1	0:49	(Note: For the ONE Featherweight Muay Thai World Championship.)
Featherweight	Martin Nguyen	def.	Leonardo Casotti	Decision (unanimous)	3	5:00
Bantamweight Kickboxing	Saemapetch Fairtex	def.	Zhang Chenglong	Decision (unanimous) (29–28, 29–28, 29–28)	3	3:00
Flyweight	Danny Kingad	def.	Eko Roni Saputra	Decision (unanimous)	3	5:00
Catchweight (119 lbs) Submission Grappling	Danielle Kelly	def.	Ayaka Miura	Decision (unanimous)	1	10:00
Light Heavyweight Kickboxing	Françesko Xhaja	def.	Andrei Stoica	Decision (split)	3	3:00
Preliminary card (YouTube / Watch ONE)
Women's Atomweight	Victória Souza	def.	Linda Darrow	Decision (unanimous)	3	5:00
Lightweight Submission Grappling	Tommy Langaker	def.	Uali Kurzhev	Submission (heel hook)	1	2:58
Strawweight	Adrian Mattheis	def.	Zelang Zhaxi	TKO (punches)	1	0:57

== Bonus awards ==
The following fighters received $50,000 bonuses.

- Performance of the Night: Tawanchai P.K.Saenchai and Tommy Langaker

== See also ==
- 2023 in ONE Championship
- List of ONE Championship events
- List of current ONE fighters
