= ONE Friday Fights 22 =

Combat sport events in 2023

ONE Friday Fights 22: Bhullar vs. Malykhin
- The poster for ONE Friday Fights 22: Bhullar vs. Malykhin
- Promotion: ONE Championship
- Date: June 23, 2023
- Venue: Lumpinee Boxing Stadium
- City: Bangkok, Thailand

Event chronology
ONE Friday Fights 21: Paidang vs. Kongsuek	ONE Friday Fights 22: Bhullar vs. Malykhin	ONE Friday Fights 23

ONE Friday Fights 22: Prajanchai vs. Sam-A 2 (also known as ONE Lumpinee 22) was a combat sports event produced by ONE Championship that took place on June 23, 2023, at Lumpinee Boxing Stadium in Bangkok, Thailand.

== Background ==
A rematch for the ONE Interim Strawweight Muay Thai Championship between former champions Prajanchai P.K.Saenchai and Sam-A Gaiyanghadao served as the event headliner. The pair previously faced each other in August 2021 at ONE: Battleground, where Prajanchai won the title by majority decision.

A ONE Heavyweight Championship unification fight between current champion Arjan Bhullar and interim champion Anatoly Malykhin is scheduled to headline the event. The pair were previously scheduled to square off at ONE 161 and then ONE Fight Night 8, but were moved to this event due to a change in broadcast commitments. However, on May 19, 2023, it was announced that the fight was moved to ONE Friday Fights 22.

== Results ==
Fight card (YouTube / Watch ONE)
Weight class				Method	Round	Time	Notes
Strawweight Muay Thai	Prajanchai P.K.Saenchai	def.	Sam-A Gaiyanghadao	KO (elbow)	2	2:10	(Note: For the interim ONE Strawweight Muay Thai World Championship.)
Flyweight Muay Thai	Superlek Kiatmuu9	def.	Nabil Anane	KO (straight to the body)	1	2:03
Catchweight (142 lbs) Muay Thai	Saeksan Or. Kwanmuang	def.	Nathan Bendon	Decision (unanimous)	3	3:00
Bantamweight Muay Thai	Nico Carrillo	def.	Muangthai P.K.Saenchai	TKO (three knockdowns)	2	1:23
Heavyweight	Anatoly Malykhin (ic)	def.	Arjan Bhullar (c)	TKO (punches)	3	2:42	(Note: For the ONE Heavyweight World Championship.)
Featherweight Muay Thai	Sitthichai Sitsongpeenong	def.	Eddie Abasolo	Decision (unanimous)	3	3:00
Bantamweight Muay Thai	Fariyar Aminipour	def.	Rambolek Chor.Ajalaboon	Decision (split)	3	3:00
Catchweight (132 lbs) Muay Thai	Kongthoranee Sor.Sommai	def.	Gingsanglek Tor.Laksong	KO (left hook)	2	0:28
Catchweight (119 lbs) Muay Thai	Akram Hamidi	def.	Jomhod AutoMuayThai	KO (left hook to the body)	2	0:36
Catchweight (119 lbs) Muay Thai	Thongpoon P.K.Saenchai	def.	Yangdam Sor.Tor. Hiewbangsaen	Decision (split)	3	3:00
Middleweight	Shamil Erdogan	def.	Fan Rong	KO (body kick)	2	0:37

== Bonus awards ==
The following fighters received $50,000 bonuses.

- Performance of the Night: Superlek Kiatmuu9, Prajanchai P.K.Saenchai and Anatoly Malykhin

The following fighters received $20,000 bonuses.

- Performance of the Night: Saeksan Or. Kwanmuang

The following fighters received $10,000 bonuses.

- Performance of the Night: Nico Carrillo, Kongthoranee Sor.Sommai, Akram Hamidi, Thongpoon P.K.Saenchai and Yangdam Sor.Tor.Hiewbangsaen

== See also ==
- 2023 in ONE Championship
- List of ONE Championship events
- List of current ONE fighters
