= ONE Championship Rankings =

ONE Championship Athlete Rankings, which were introduced in April 2020, are generated by a system of artificial intelligence, to determine the best fighters in each weight class and sport. This system originally had a panel of media members, who were asked to vote for whom they feel are the top fighters in ONE Championship by weight class and pound-for-pound from mixed martial arts, kickboxing and Muay Thai. Currently, there are only rankings for the Muay Thai divisions of men's flyweight, bantamweight, featherweight, and women's strawweight.

== Background ==
=== Original ranking panel ===
ONE Championship’s official athlete rankings were determined by an independent panel of sports media members and industry experts following each event. The panel ranks the athletes on criteria including wins and losses, their most recent performances, and quality of competition. The committee consists of:

1. Nicolas Atkin – Sportskeeda
2. Stewart Fulton – MMA in Japan
3. Manabu Takashima – MMAPLANET
4. Tom Taylor – BJPenn.com
5. Alan Dawson – Insider Inc.
6. James Goyder – AsianMMA.com
7. JM Siasat – GMA Network
8. Nissi Icasiano – International Business Times
9. Leon Jennings – Asian Persuasion MMA
10. Ian Shutts – LowKickMMA
11. Sazali Abdul Aziz – The Straits Times
12. Dylan Bowker – Sportskeeda
13. Wanlop Sawasdee – MGR Online
14. Worapath Arunpakdee – Thairath TV
15. Poptorn Roongsamai – Champ Magazine

Rounding out the panel had former athletes Rich Franklin, Adam Kayoom, and Ann Osman rank athlete with the same criteria.

=== Introduction of AI-powered rankings ===
Ever since the re-introduction of the Athlete Rankings in 2026, ONE has switched to an artificial intelligence-powered set of rankings.

== Overview ==
The rankings for the ONE's fighters are both recorded and updated when information has been obtained from the ONE's website.

- Last Updated: September 22, 2026

Legend
▲ +1	Move Up
Steady	No Change
▼ −1	Move Down
New entry	Not Previously Ranked

== Featherweight Muay Thai ==
Upper weight limit • 155 lb / 70.3 kg

Rank	ISO	Fighter	Record	M	Win Streak	Last fight			Next fight	
Rank	ISO	Fighter	Record	M	Win Streak	Result	Event	Opponent	Event	Opponent
C	(Scotland)	Nico Carrillo	31–4–1	Steady	4 (0 def.)	Win	ONE Fight Night 46	Zhou Jiaqiang	The Inner Circle 46	Nabil Anane
1	(Thailand)	Tawanchai P.K. Saenchai	134–32–2	Steady	0	Loss	ONE Friday Fights 137	Liu Mengyang	December 2025 – Shin bone surgery	
2	(Thailand)	Shadow Singha Mawynn	82–25–1 (1)	Steady	0	Loss	ONE Fight Night 40	Nico Carrillo	TBD	
3	(Iran)	Mohammad Siasarani	28–14	Steady	0	Loss	ONE Samurai 4	Masaaki Noiri	TBD	
4	(Argentina)	Ricardo Bravo	28–5	Steady	1	Win	ONE Fight Night 47	Mohamed Younes Rabah	TBD	
5	(France) (Mali)	Bampara Kouyaté	36–3	Steady	0	Loss	ONE Fight Night 35	Shadow Singha Mawynn	TBD	

== Bantamweight Muay Thai ==
Upper weight limit • 145 lb / 65.8 kg

Rank	ISO	Fighter	Record	M	Win Streak	Last fight			Next fight	
Rank	ISO	Fighter	Record	M	Win Streak	Result	Event	Opponent	Event	Opponent
C	(Thailand)	Yod-IQ Or.Pimolsri	128–36	Steady	11 (0 def.)	Win	The Inner Circle 30	Rambolek Chor.Ajalaboon	TBD	
1	(Thailand)	Rambolek Chor.Ajalaboon	68–15	Steady	0	Loss	The Inner Circle 30	Yod-IQ Or.Pimolsri	TBD	
2	(Thailand)	Suakim Pongsuphan P.K.	111–25–3	Steady	7	Win	The Inner Circle 25	Nabil Anane	TBD	
3	(Thailand) (Algeria)	Nabil Anane	42–7–1 (1)	Steady	1	Win	ONE Samurai 4	Yuki Yoza	The Inner Circle 46	Nico Carrillo
4	(Russia)	Abdulla Dayakaev	24–3	Steady	2	Win	The Inner Circle 25	Superlek Kiatmuu9	TBD	
5	(Russia)	Kiamran Nabati	23–1 (1)	Steady	1	Win	The Inner Circle 31	Nonthachai Jitmuangnon	TBD	

== Flyweight Muay Thai ==
Upper weight limit • 135 lb / 61.2 kg

Rank	ISO	Fighter	Record	M	Win Streak	Last fight			Next fight	
Rank	ISO	Fighter	Record	M	Win Streak	Result	Event	Opponent	Event	Opponent
C	(Russia)	Asadula Imangazaliev	14–0	Steady	13 (1 def.)	Win	The Inner Circle 39	Aslamjon Ortikov	TBD	
1	(Uzbekistan)	Aslamjon Ortikov	24–2	Steady	0	Loss	The Inner Circle 39	Asadula Imangazaliev	TBD	
2	(Thailand)	Rodtang Jitmuangnon	274–45–10	Steady	0	Loss	The Inner Circle 38	Nong-O Hama	TBD	
3	(Thailand)	Nong-O Hama	269–59–10	Steady	2	Win	The Inner Circle 38	Rodtang Jitmuangnon	TBD	
4	(Japan)	Shimon Yoshinari	39–4 (1)	Steady	4	Win	ONE Friday Fights 178	Ramadan Ondash	TBD	
5	(Lebanon)	Ramadan Ondash	14–4	Steady	0	Loss	ONE Friday Fights 178	Shimon Yoshinari	TBD	

== Women's Atomweight Muay Thai ==
Upper weight limit • 115 lb / 52.2 kg

Rank	ISO	Fighter	Record	M	Win Streak	Last fight			Next fight	
Rank	ISO	Fighter	Record	M	Win Streak	Result	Event	Opponent	Event	Opponent
C	(Brazil)	Allycia Rodrigues	36–6	Steady	4 (5 def.)	Win	The Inner Circle 19	Phetjeeja Lukjaoporongtom	TBD	
1	(Thailand)	Phetjeeja Lukjaoporongtom	210–7–3	Steady	0	Loss	The Inner Circle 19	Allycia Rodrigues	TBD	
2	(Myanmar)	Vero Nika	22–3	Steady	4	Win	The Inner Circle 15	Kana Morimoto	TBD	
3	(Thailand)	Stamp Fairtex	65–18–5	Steady	1	Win	ONE Fight Night 47	Selina Flores	TBD	
4	(United States)	Selina Flores	9–2	Steady	0	Loss	ONE Fight Night 47	Stamp Fairtex	TBD	
5	(Hong Kong)	Yu Yau Pui	30–5	Steady	1	Win	ONE Fight Night 48	Marie McManamon	TBD	

== See also ==
- List of undefeated mixed martial artists
- List of current ONE fighters
- List of ONE Championship champions
