= ONE Fight Night 16 =

Combat sport events in 2023

ONE Fight Night 16: Haggerty vs. Andrade
- The poster for ONE Fight Night 16: Haggerty vs. Andrade
- Promotion: ONE Championship
- Date: November 4, 2023
- Venue: Lumpinee Boxing Stadium
- City: Bangkok, Thailand

Event chronology
ONE Friday Fights 39: Kongklai vs. Şen	ONE Fight Night 16: Haggerty vs. Andrade	ONE Friday Fights 40: Jaosuayai vs. Paidang

ONE Fight Night 16: Haggerty vs. Andrade was a combat sport event produced by ONE Championship that took place on November 4, 2023, at Lumpinee Boxing Stadium in Bangkok, Thailand.

== Background ==
A ONE Bantamweight Kickboxing World Championship for the vacant title between current ONE Bantamweight Muay Thai champion Jonathan Haggerty (also former ONE Flyweight Muay Thai champion) and current ONE Bantamweight champion Fabrício Andrade headlined the event. If successful, Haggerty and Andrade would have become the fourth fighter in ONE history to win a title in different sports (after Stamp Fairtex at ONE: Call to Greatness, Sam-A Gaiyanghadao at ONE: King of the Jungle and Regian Eersel at ONE on Prime Video 3). The bout was originally scheduled to meet at ONE Fight Night 15, but the bout was moved to this event for unknown reasons. Former champion Petchtanong Petchfergus was stripped of the title due to testing positive for both metenolone and boldenone, banned substance according to the World Anti-Doping Agency (WADA).

The inaugural ONE Welterweight Submission Grappling World Championship bout between Tye Ruotolo and Magomed Abdulkadirov served as the co-main event.

During fight week, two bouts booked for this event suffered changes: Liam Nolan and Johan Estupiñan pulled out of his lightweight muay thai rematch against Sinsamut Klinmee and catchweight of 140 pounds muay thai against Saeksan Or. Kwanmuang for undisclosed reasons and was replaced by Mouhcine Chafi and Karim Bennoui respectively.

At the weigh-ins, Mouhcine Chafi weighed in at 174.5 pounds, four and half pounds over the lightweight fight limit. His bout proceeded at catchweight and he was fined 30% of his purse, which went to his opponent Sinsamut Klinmee.

== Results ==
Main card (Amazon Prime Video)
Weight class				Method	Round	Time	Notes
Bantamweight Kickboxing	Jonathan Haggerty	def.	Fabrício Andrade	KO (punches)	2	1:57	(Note: For the vacant ONE Bantamweight Kickboxing World Championship.)
Welterweight Submission Grappling	Tye Ruotolo	def.	Magomed Abdulkadirov	Decision (unanimous)	1	10:00	(Note: For the inaugural ONE Welterweight Submission Grappling World Championship.)
Catchweight (140 lbs) Muay Thai	Saeksan Or. Kwanmuang	def.	Karim Bennoui	Decision (unanimous)	3	3:00
Lightweight	Halil Amir	def.	Ahmed Mujtaba	TKO (punches)	1	5:00
Lightweight Muay Thai	Sinsamut Klinmee	def.	Mouhcine Chafi	Decision (unanimous)	3	3:00	(Note: Chafi missed weight (174.5 lb).)
Strawweight Kickboxing	Rui Botelho	def.	Zhang Peimian	Decision (split)	3	3:00
Women's Strawweight	Ayaka Miura	def.	Meng Bo	Submission (scarf hold armlock)	1	2:09
Heavyweight	Ben Tynan	def.	Kang Ji-won	Submission (arm-triangle choke)	3	1:22
Women's Atomweight Kickboxing	Cristina Morales	def.	Supergirl Jaroonsak	TKO (punches)	1	2:54
Strawweight	Lito Adiwang	def.	Jeremy Miado	Decision (unanimous)	3	5:00

== Bonus awards ==
The following fighters were awarded bonuses:

- Performance of the Night ($100,000): Jonathan Haggerty
- Performance of the Night ($50,000): Tye Ruotolo, Ben Tynan and Cristina Morales

== Aftermath ==
During the event post-fight interview with Jonathan Haggerty, Venum Training Camp's co-owner Mehdi Zatout and Alaverdi Ramazanov bypass security to stage confrontation with Haggerty, they breached security and forced themselves into the ring despite attempts by security to prevent them from doing so. It is unacceptable behaviour and jeopardises the safety of everyone in the stadium, make the CEO Chatri Sityodtong has suspended both Zatout and Ramazanov from attending events for 6 months.

== See also ==
- 2023 in ONE Championship
- List of ONE Championship events
- List of current ONE fighters
