= Klinmee =

Klinmee is a surname. Notable people with the surname include:

- Sinsamut Klinmee (born 1995), Thai Muay Thai fighter
- Sudsakorn Sor Klinmee (born 1986), Thai Muay Thai fighter
