= Aslanbek Zikreev =

Russian kickboxer

- Born: September 15, 1995 (age 31); Kemerovo, Russia
- Native name: Асланбек Зикреев
- Nationality: (Russia) Russian
- Height: 1.65 m (5 ft 5 in)
- Weight: 57 kg (126 lb; 9.0 st)
- Style: Muay Thai, Kickboxing
- Stance: Orthodox
- Fighting out of: Kemerovo, Russia
- Team: Kuzbass Muay Thai
- Years active: 2016 - present

Kickboxing record
- Total: 23
- Wins: 16
- By knockout: 3
- Losses: 7

Medal record

Men's Muay Thai

Representing Russia

World Championships
Gold medal – first place	2016 Jönköping	54 kg
Silver medal – second place	2017 Minsk	54 kg
Bronze medal – third place	2021 Bangkok	54 kg

World Games
Bronze medal – third place	2017 Wrocław	54 kg

IFMA European Championships
Gold medal – first place	2018 Prague	54 kg
Gold medal – first place	2019 Minsk	54 kg

IFMA World Cup
Gold medal – first place	2016 Kazan	54 kg

Aslanbek Zikreev (born 15 September 1995) is a Russian kickboxer and Muay Thai fighter.

Combat Press ranked him as the #8 Super Flyweight in the world between December 2020 and July 2021.

== Kickboxing career ==
=== ONE Championship ===
Zikreev made his professional debut against Wang Junguang at ONE Championship: Inside the Matrix 4 on November 20, 2020. He won the bout by split decision, after a closely contested fight.

Zikreev is scheduled to face Asahi Shinagawa at ONE Championship: Lights Out on March 11, 2022. Zikreev was unable to compete due to sanctions from the Singaporean government against Russia.

Zikreev faced Zhang Peimian at ONE 159 on July 22, 2022. He lost the fight by unanimous decision.

Zikreev faced Rui Botelho, replacing Danial Williams on March 25, 2023, at ONE Fight Night 8. He won the fight via split decision.

== Titles and accomplishments ==
=== Professional ===
- Xtreme Cambodia Kun Khmer
  - 2025 Xtreme Cambodia Kun Khmer 60 kg Champion

=== Amateur ===
- World Games
  - 2017 World Games Muay Thai -54 kg (bronze)
- International Federation of Muaythai Associations
  - 2016 IFMA World Cup in Kazan -54 kg (gold)
  - 2016 IFMA World Championships -54 kg (bronze)
  - 2017 IFMA World Championships -54 kg (silver)
  - 2018 IFMA European Championships -54 kg (gold)
  - 2018 FISU World University Championship -54 kg (silver)
  - 2019 IFMA European Championships -54 kg (gold)
  - 2021 IFMA World Championships -54 kg (gold)

== Fight record ==
Professional Kickboxing and Muay Thai Record
16 Wins (3 (T)KO's), 7 Losses, 0 Draw
Date	Result	Opponent	Event	Location	Method	Round	Time
2025-03-15	Win	(Cambodia) Bird Songkherm	Xtreme Cambodia Kun Khmer	Phnom Penh, Cambodia	KO (Punches)	3	
Wins the Xtreme Cambodia Kun Khmer 60kg title.
2025-02-15	Loss	(Thailand) Yothin FA Group	Rajadamnern World Series	Bangkok, Thailand	Decision (Unanimous)	3	3:00
2025-01-18	Win	(Thailand) Diesel	Rajadamnern World Series	Bangkok, Thailand	TKO (Knees)	3	
2024-12-14	Loss	(Japan) Akihiro Kaneko	K-1 World Grand Prix 2024 Final	Tokyo, Japan	Decision (Unanimous)	3	3:00
2024-11-09	Win	(Brazil) Daniel Nascimento	Rajadamnern World Series	Bangkok, Thailand	TKO (Punches)	3	2:33
2023-12-30	Win	(China) Ma Qiang	Wu Lin Feng 2023 Year-End Kung Fu Festival	Zhengzhou, China	Decision (Unanimous)	3	3:00
2023-11-17	Loss	(Thailand) View Petchkoson	ONE Friday Fights 41, Lumpinee Stadium	Bangkok, Thailand	Decision (Unanimous)	3	3:00
2023-04-21	Loss	(Thailand) Hercules Wor Chakrawut	ONE Friday Fights 13, Lumpinee Stadium	Bangkok, Thailand	Decision (Split)	3	3:00
2023-03-25	Win	(Portugal) Rui Botelho	ONE Fight Night 8	Kallang, Singapore	Decision (split)	3	3:00
2022-11-26	Win	(Russia) Turach Novruzov	RCC Fair Fight 19	Yekaterinburg, Russia	Decision (Unanimous)	3	3:00
2022-07-22	Loss	(China) Zhang Peimian	ONE 159	Kallang, Singapore	Decision (unanimous)	3	3:00
2022-02-05	Win	(Thailand) Nichoa	Muaythai Factory	Kemerovo, Russia	Decision (unanimous)	3	3:00
2021-10-21	Win	(Russia) Abdul Buranov	Muaythai Factory	Kemerovo, Russia	KO (spinning back elbow)	1	4:45
2020-11-20	Win	(China) Wang Junguang	ONE Championship: Inside the Matrix 4	Kallang, Singapore	Decision (split)	3	3:00
Legend: Win Loss Draw/No contest Notes

Amateur Muay Thai Record (Incomplete)
Date	Result	Opponent	Event	Location	Method	Round	Time
2024-06-03	Loss	(Ukraine) Dmytro Shelesko	IFMA 2024 World Championships, First Round	Patras, Greece	Decision (29:28)	3	3:00
2021-12-11	Win	(Thailand) Matee Thueanthet	2021 IFMA World Championships, Final	Bangkok, Thailand	Decision (29:28)	3	3:00
Wins the 2021 IFMA World -54kg Gold Medal.
2021-12-10	Win	(Kazakhstan) Shamil Yermagambetov	2021 IFMA World Championships, Semi Finals	Bangkok, Thailand	Decision (30:27)	3	3:00
2021-12-08	Win	(Spain) Kevin Martínez Bravo	2021 IFMA World Championships, Quarter Finals	Bangkok, Thailand	RSCO	3	
2021-12-06	Win	(Turkey) Abdullah Ertas	2021 IFMA World Championships, Round 1	Bangkok, Thailand	Decision (30:25)	3	3:00
2019-11-10	Win	(Belarus) Sagif Gasanov	2019 IFMA European Championships, Final	Minsk, Belarus	Decision (30:27)	3	3:00
Wins the 2019 IFMA European Championship -54kg Gold Medal.
2019-11-08	Win	(Spain) Kevin Martinez Bravo	2019 IFMA European Championships, Semi Final	Minsk, Belarus	Decision (30:25)	3	3:00
2019-11-05	Win	(Turkey) Cafer Gok	2019 IFMA European Championships, Quarter Final	Minsk, Belarus	Decision	3	3:00
2018-07-28	Loss	(Kazakhstan) Elaman Sayassatov	2018 IFMA-FISU University World Championship, Final	Pattaya, Thailand	Decision (29:28)	3	3:00
Wins FISU World Championship -54kg Silver Medal.
2018-07-26	Win	(Thailand) Pengsai Ausma	2018 IFMA-FISU University World Championship, Semi Final	Pattaya, Thailand	Decision (29:28)	3	3:00
2018-07-07	Win	(Spain) Kevin Martinez Bravo	2018 IFMA European Championships, Final	Prague, Czech Republic	Decision (29:28)	3	3:00
Wins the 2018 IFMA European Championship -54kg Gold Medal.
2018-07-04	Win	(Ukraine) Andrii Mezentsev	2018 IFMA European Championships, Semi Final	Prague, Czech Republic	Decision (30:27)	3	3:00
2018-07-01	Win	(Belarus) Sagif Gasanov	2018 IFMA European Championships, Quarter Final	Prague, Czech Republic	Decision (30:27)	3	3:00
2017-07-30	Win	(Korea) Deok Jae Yoon	World Games 2017, Bronze Medal Fight	Wrocław, Poland	Decision	3	3:00
Wins the 2017 World Games Muay Thai -54kg Bronze Medal.
2017-07-29	Loss	(Kazakhstan) Elaman Sayassatov	World Games 2017, Semi Finals	Wrocław, Poland	Decision (30:27)	3	3:00
2017-07-28	Win	(Chinese Taipei) Yu Xi Chen	World Games 2017, Quarter Finals	Wrocław, Poland	RSC-OC	2	
2017-05-12	Loss	(Thailand) Sprinter Pangkongprab	2017 IFMA World Championships, Final	Minsk, Belarus	Decision (30:27)	3	3:00
Wins the 2017 IFMA World Championship -54kg Silver Medal.
2017-05-10	Win	(Belarus) Mikalai Sviadomski	2017 IFMA World Championships, Semi Final	Minsk, Belarus	Decision (29:28)	3	3:00
2017-05-08	Win	(Morocco) Issam Bougadir	2017 IFMA World Championships, Quarter Final	Minsk, Belarus	Decision (29:28)	3	3:00
2016-11-26	Win	(France) Clément Adrover	IFMA World Cup 2016 in Kazan, Final	Kazan, Russia	Decision	3	
Wins the 2016 IFMA World Cup -54kg Gold Medal.
2016-11-24	Win	(Iran) Hossein Nasiriyengejeh	IFMA World Cup 2016 in Kazan, Semi Final	Kazan, Russia	TKO	2	
2016-11-22	Win	(Poland) Kamil Dybiec	IFMA World Cup 2016 in Kazan, Quarter Final	Kazan, Russia	TKO	2	
2016-05-26	Loss	(Kazakhstan) Mussin Ilyas	2016 IFMA World Championships, Semi Final	Jonkoping, Sweden	Decision (29:28)	3	
Wins the 2016 IFMA World Championships -54kg Bronze Medal.
2016-05-23	Win	(Ukraine) Roman Vagilevich	2016 IFMA World Championships, Quarter Final	Jonkoping, Sweden	Decision (29:28)	3	
2015-08-	Loss	(Morocco) Boubkar Ariba	2015 IFMA World Championships, Quarter Finals	Bangkok, Thailand	Decision	3	3:00
2015-08-	Win	(Turkey) Gokhan Kara	2015 IFMA World Championships, 1/8 Finals	Bangkok, Thailand	Decision	3	3:00
Legend: Win Loss Draw/No contest Notes

== See also ==
- List of male kickboxers
