= Liam Nolan (Muay Thai) =

British Muay Thai fighter (born 1997)

- Born: Liam Emmanuel Nolan-Guigne; 27 May 1997 (age 29); Bordeaux, France
- Nationality: (United Kingdom) British
- Height: 1.87 m (6 ft 1 1/2 in)
- Weight: 77 kg (170 lb; 12 st 2 lb)
- Division: Middleweight
- Style: Muay Thai
- Stance: Southpaw
- Fighting out of: London, England
- Team: Knowlesy Academy
- Trainer: Christian Knowles
- Years active: 2013–2025

Kickboxing record
- Total: 32
- Wins: 22
- By knockout: 15
- Losses: 9
- By knockout: 4
- Draws: 1

Liam Nolan is a British retired Muay Thai fighter. He competed for the ONE Championship organization and was the former WBC Muay Thai World Middleweight Champion.

== Biography and career ==
=== Early years ===
Nolan grew up in London where he tried Wing Chun and Taekwondo before switching to Muay Thai and settling at The Minotaur Gym, future Knowlesy Academy. Under the teaching of Christian Knowles, Nolan started to compete regularly at the age of 13 in both Muay Thai and kickboxing rules often against older opponents. By the time he was 16 years old Nolan had decided to leave school and pursue a professional career.

On 4 March 2017 Nolan captured his first professional title when he defeated Dean Blunt by unanimous decision, becoming the IKF Pro Muay Thai British champion.

On 29 September 2017 Nolan faced Anthony Njokuani at the inaugural Triumphant fight series event in Rohnert Park, California, United States. Nolan won by split decision and became the WMC Intercontinental -72.5 kg Champion.

On 5 May 2018 Nolan traveled to France to compete on the Hanuman Fight event where he defeated Papou Samaké by decision after five rounds.

On 6 October 2018 Nolan faced Connor McCormack at the Roar Combat League 10 event. The fight would determine the #1 rated Super Welterweight fighter in the Uk and a new Roar Combat League champion. Nolan won by split decision.

=== ONE Championship ===
In January 2019 Liam Nolan signed a contract with ONE Championship. He made his debut on 8 March 2019 at ONE Championship: Reign of Valor against Enriko Kehl under kickboxing rules. Nolan was defeated by second-round TKO.

On 16 August 2019 Nolan faced Bangpleenoi PetchyindeeAcademy at ONE Championship: Dreams of Gold. The fight was disputed at a catchweight of 72 kg. He lost the fight by majority decision. The decision was controversial due to the referee judging as a slip what appeared to be a knockdown from an elbow strike landed by Nolan during the first round.

On 22 November 2019 Nolan registered his first win under the ONE banner as he defeated Brown Pinas by unanimous decision at ONE Championship: Edge Of Greatness.

=== WBC Muay Thai world middleweight champion ===
On 7 November 2021 Nolan challenged Youssef Boughanem for his WBC Muay Thai World title at a Real Fighters promotion event in Hilversum, Netherlands. Nolan won the fight by split decision, becoming the 8th WBC Muay Thai World Middleweight Champion and handing his first loss under Muay Thai rules in six years to the former champion.

=== Return to ONE Championship ===
In January 2022 Nolan announced he signed a new six-fight deal with ONE Championship. He was booked to face Eduard Saik at ONE: Lights Out on 11 March 2022. His opponent was replaced on short notice by Kim Kyung Lock who Nolan accepted to face at a catchweight. He won the fight by technical knockout in the first round.

Nolan faced Sinsamut Klinmee at ONE 159 on 22 July 2022, as a late notice replacement for Islam Murtazaev. He lost the fight by a second-round knockout, as he was floored with a counter left hook.

Nolan faced Eddie Abasolo on 19 November 2022, at ONE on Prime Video 4. He won the fight via unanimous decision.

Nolan was scheduled to face Rungrawee Sitsongpeenong on 5 August 2023, at ONE Fight Night 13. However, Nolan withdrew due to injury and was replaced by Nauzet Trujillo.

Nolan was scheduled to face Sinsamut Klinmee in a rematch on 4 November 2023, at ONE Fight Night 16. However, Nolan pulled out for undisclosed reason and was replaced by Mouhcine Chafi.

Nolan faced Ali Aliev on January 13, 2024, at ONE Fight Night 18. He won the fight via unanimous decision.

Nolan faced WMC Spain Champion Nauzet Trujillo on February 17, 2024 at ONE Fight Night 19, losing the fight via unanimous decision.

Returned from retired, Nolan was scheduled to rematch against Trujillo on May 3, 2025, at ONE Fight Night 31. However, Trujillo withdrew from the event due to injury and was replaced by promotional newcomer Abolfazl Alipourandi on a one-day notice.

== Titles and accomplishments ==
- ONE Championship
  - Performance of the Night (One time) vs. Kim Kyung Lock
- World Boxing Council Muay Thai
  - 2021 WBC Muay Thai World Middleweight Champion
- Roar Combat League
  - 2018 RCL World Super Welterweight Champion
- World Muay Thai Council
  - 2017 WMC Intercontinental -160 lbs Champion
- International Kickboxing Federation
  - 2017 IKF Pro Muay Thai British -160 lbs Champion
- International Federation of Muaythai Associations
  - 2022 IFMA World Championships -75 kg (bronze)

Awards

- Thai Fighter UK
  - 2018 Fighter of the Year
  - 2021 Fighter of the Year

== Muay Thai record ==
Muay Thai and Kickboxing record
22 Wins (15 (T)KOs), 9 Losses, 1 Draw
Date	Result	Opponent	Event	Location	Method	Round	Time
2025-05-03	Loss	(Iran) Abolfazl Alipourandi	ONE Fight Night 31	Bangkok, Thailand	KO (head kick)	1	0:59
2024-02-17	Loss	(Spain) Nauzet Trujillo	ONE Fight Night 19	Bangkok, Thailand	Decision (Unanimous)	3	3:00
2024-01-13	Win	(Russia) Ali Aliev	ONE Fight Night 18	Bangkok, Thailand	Decision (Unanimous)	3	3:00
2022-11-19	Win	(United States) Eddie Abasolo	ONE on Prime Video 4	Kallang, Singapore	Decision (Unanimous)	3	3:00
2022-07-22	Loss	(Thailand) Sinsamut Klinmee	ONE 159	Kallang, Singapore	KO (Left hook)	2	0:05
2022-03-11	Win	(South Korea) Kim Kyung Lock	ONE: Lights Out	Kallang, Singapore	TKO (Knees)	1	1:02
2021-11-07	Win	(Morocco) Youssef Boughanem	Real Fighters Promotions	Hilversum, Netherlands	Decision (Split)	5	3:00
Wins the WBC Muay Thai World Middleweight title.
2020-09-25	Win	(Poland) Amadeusz Sakowicz	Roar Combat League 20	Cullompton, England	KO (Knee to the body)	1	
2019-11-22	Win	(Netherlands) Brown Pinas	ONE Championship: Edge Of Greatness	Kallang, Singapore	Decision (Unanimous)	3	3:00
2019-08-16	Loss	(Thailand) Bangpleenoi PetchyindeeAcademy	ONE Championship: Dreams of Gold	Bangkok, Thailand	Decision (Majority)	3	3:00
2019-03-08	Loss	(Germany) Enriko Kehl	ONE Championship 92: Reign of Valor	Yangon, Myanmar	TKO (Left Knee to the Body)	2	
2018-12-01	Win	(Thailand) Noppakao Kor Kasanon	Roar Combat League 12	Harrow, England	TKO (Middle Kick/Arm Injury)	5	
2018-10-06	Win	(United Kingdom) Connor McCormack	Roar Combat League 10	Harrow, England	Decision (Split)	5	3:00
Wins the Roar Combat League World Super Welterweight title.
2018-05-05	Win	(France) Papou Samaké	Hanuman Fight IV	Saint-Hilaire-de-Riez, France	Decision	5	3:00
2018-03-10	Win	(United Kingdom) Charlie Guest	Stand and Bang	Woking, England	Decision (Unanimous)	5	3:00
2017-12-23	Win	(Thailand) Yodsanklai	Best of Samui, Petchbuncha Stadium	Ko Samui, Thailand	KO	1	
2017-09-29	Win	(Nigeria) Anthony Njokuani	Triumphant I Muay Thai Series 1	Rohnert Park, California, United States	Decision (Split)	5	3:00
Wins the WMC Intercontinental -160 lbs title.
2017-08-06	Win	(United Kingdom) Chris Melhuish	Road to Muay Thai Grand Prix	Harrow, England	Decision (Unanimous)	3	3:00
2017-03-04	Win	(United Kingdom) Dean Blunt	Pantheon Fight Series IMPERIUM	Hastings, England	Decision (Unanimous)	5	3:00
Wins the IKF Pro Muay Thai British -160 lbs title.
2017-02-11	Loss	(Barbados) Leyton Collymore	Roar Combat League 5	Bolton, England	Decision (Unanimous)	5	3:00
2016-05-28	Loss	(Poland) Dominik Matusz	Roar Combat League	Watford, England	Decision (Split)	5	3:00
2013-06-15	Loss	(United Kingdom) Kane Chamberlain	Smash Muay Thai 6	England	TKO	5	
2013-03-09	Win	(United Kingdom) Luke Imeson	Smash Muay Thai 3	Liverpool, England	Decision (Majority)	5	3:00
Legend: Win Loss Draw/No contest Notes

Amateur Muay Thai Record
Date	Result	Opponent	Event	Location	Method	Round	Time
2022-06-02	Loss	(Morocco) Youssef Assouik	IFMA World Championships 2022, Semi Finals	Abu Dhabi, United Arab Emirates	Decision	3	3:00
Wins 2022 IFMA World Championships -75kg Bronze Medal.
2022-05-31	Win	(Slovenia) Domen Vidmar	IFMA World Championships 2022, Quarter Finals	Abu Dhabi, United Arab Emirates	Decision (Unanimous)	3	3:00
2022-05-30	Win	(Kazakhstan) Marat Bakytzhan	IFMA World Championships 2022, Second Round	Abu Dhabi, United Arab Emirates	Decision (Unanimous)	3	3:00
Legend: Win Loss Draw/No contest Notes
