= ONE 159 =

Combat sport events in 2022

ONE 159: de Ridder vs. Bigdash
- The poster for ONE 159: de Ridder vs. Bigdash
- Promotion: ONE Championship
- Date: July 22, 2022
- Venue: Singapore Indoor Stadium
- City: Kallang, Singapore

Event chronology
ONE 158: Tawanchai vs. Larsen	ONE 159: de Ridder vs. Bigdash	ONE 160: Ok vs. Lee 2

ONE 159: de Ridder vs. Bigdash was a Combat sport event produced by ONE Championship that took place on July 22, 2022, at the Singapore Indoor Stadium in Kallang, Singapore.

== Background ==
A ONE Middleweight World Championship bout between the champion Reinier de Ridder and former champion Vitaly Bigdash headlined the event.

An interim ONE Women's Atomweight Muay Thai World Championship bout between the ONE Kickboxing Atomweight World champion Janet Todd and Lara Fernandez was booked as the co-main event.

Fight card update

A Lightweight Muay Thai bout between Sinsamut Klinmee and former ONE Lightweight Kickboxing Championship challenger Islam Murtazaev was expected to take place at the event. However, Murtazaev withdraw due to a family emergency and was replaced by Liam Nolan.

A Women's Atomweight Submission grappling rematch between 2018 Asian Games gold medalist in Jujitsu and 2019 Southeast Asian Games gold medalist in Jujitsu Jessa Khan and Amanda Alequin was scheduled to take place at the event. However, Alequin withdraw due to undisclosed medical issue.

A Heavyweight bout between Anderson Silva and Mikhail Jamal Abdul-Latif was scheduled to take place at the event. However, Abdul-Latif withdrawal due to suffered an injury.

== Results ==
Main Card (YouTube / Watch ONE)
Weight class				Method	Round	Time	Notes
Middleweight	Reinier de Ridder (c)	def.	Vitaly Bigdash	Technical Submission (inverted triangle choke)	1	3:29	(Note: For the ONE Middleweight World Championship)
Women's Atomweight Muay Thai	Janet Todd	def.	Lara Fernandez	Decision (unanimous)	5	3:00	(Note: For the interim ONE Women's Atomweight Muay Thai World Championship)
Bantamweight Muay Thai	Muangthai P.K.Saenchai	def.	Vladimir Kuzmin	Decision (split)	3	3:00
Strawweight Kickboxing	Zhang Peimian	def.	Aslanbek Zikreev	Decision (unanimous)	3	3:00
Featherweight Muay Thai	Jamal Yusupov	def.	Jo Nattawut	Decision (unanimous)	3	3:00
Strawweight	Danial Williams	def.	Zelang Zhaxi	KO (punch)	1	4:20
Lead Card (YouTube/Watch ONE)
Lightweight Muay Thai	Sinsamut Klinmee	def.	Liam Nolan	KO (punch)	2	0:05
Lightweight	Marat Gafurov	def.	Ariel Sexton	TKO (punches)	3	4:15
Welterweight	Valmir da Silva	def.	Jin Tae-ho	Submission (guillotine choke)	2	4:55

== Bonus awards ==
The following fighters received $50,000 bonuses.

- Performance of the Night: Reinier de Ridder, Danial Williams and Sinsamut Klinmee

== See also ==
- 2022 in ONE Championship
- List of ONE Championship events
- List of current ONE fighters
