= Jonathan Haggerty =

British Muay Thai fighter

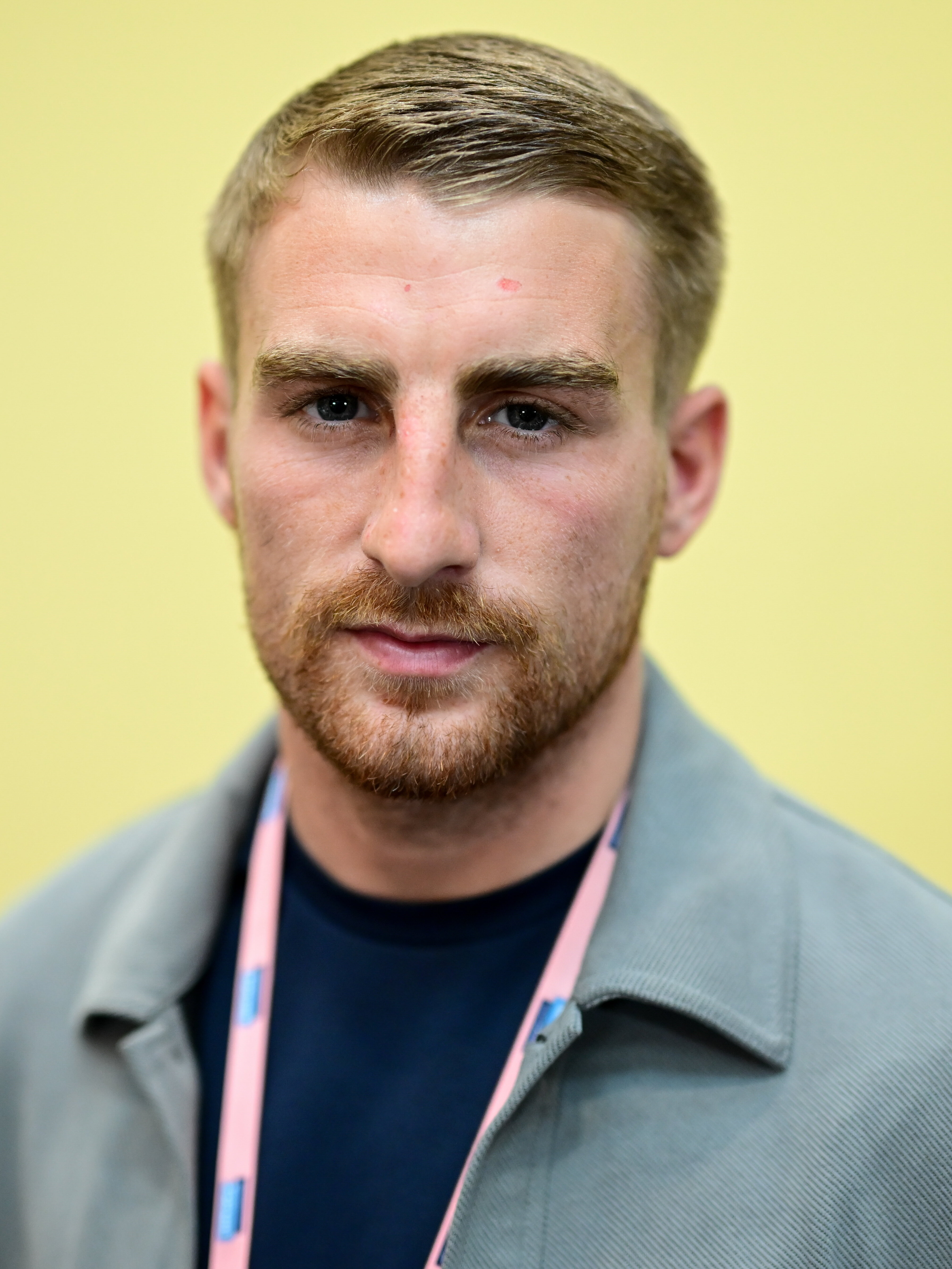
- Haggerty in 2024
- Born: 18 February 1997 (age 29); Orpington, England
- Nickname: The General
- Height: 170 cm (5 ft 7 in)
- Division: Bantamweight; Featherweight; Lightweight
- Reach: 184 cm (72 in)
- Style: Muay Thai; Kickboxing
- Stance: Orthodox
- Fighting out of: London, England
- Team: Team Underground; Knowlesy Academy; Keddles Gym
- Trainer: Lyndon Knowles; Christian Knowles
- Years active: 2014–present

Kickboxing record
- Total: 31
- Wins: 26
- By knockout: 17
- Losses: 5
- By knockout: 3

Jonathan Haggerty (born 18 February 1997) is an English professional Muay Thai fighter and kickboxer currently signed with ONE Championship. He is the reigning ONE Bantamweight Kickboxing World Champion and former ONE Flyweight & Bantamweight Muay Thai World Champion.

Holding wins over Sam-A and Nong-O Gaiyanghadao, Haggerty is considered as one of the top British Muay Thai fighters of his generation.

== Background ==
Haggerty grew up in Walworth Road, London, with a younger brother and two younger sisters. He learned Muay Thai from his father at the age of 7, and he started competing as an amateur at the age of 12. He is a supporter of his local football team Millwall FC.

== Career ==
=== Early career ===
Haggerty made his professional debut in 2014, against Anthony Edwards, winning the fight by a fourth round TKO. He would win his next four fights by stoppage, before fighting Gery Bavetta at Muaythai Mayhem for the ISKA World Super-Featherweight Muay Thai title. He defeated Bavetta by a third round knockout.

In his next two fights, Haggerty defeated Geo Marchese and James O'Connell by a first round stoppage. He suffered his first professional loss during Yokkao 28, losing a decision to Ja Kiatphontip. He rebounded with a second round knockout of Keith McLachlan at Yokkao 29. He was scheduled to fight Liam Harrison at Yokkao 31, but the fight would later fall through. Harrison was replaced by Superlek Kiatmuu9, with Superlek winning by TKO. Before appearing at Yokkao 31, Haggerty won the WBC Muaythai Super Featherweight International title with a TKO of Isaac Araya.

=== ONE Championship ===
Haggerty made his ONE Championship debut in January 2019 and defeated Joseph Lasiri via unanimous decision.

On 4 May 2019 he defeated the legendary Sam-A Gaiyanghadao at ONE Championship: For Honor to claim the ONE Flyweight Muay Thai World Championship.

Immediately after receiving the belt he called out Thai boxing phenom Rodtang Jitmuangnon against whom he would make his first title defence. The bout took place on 2 August 2019, with Haggerty losing the ONE Flyweight Muay Thai World Championship to Jitmuangnon at ONE Championship: Dawn of Heroes.

Jonathan Haggerty eventually faced Rodtang in a rematch for the ONE Muay Thai title at ONE Championship: A New Tomorrow on 10 January 2020. He was knocked down in the opening round and was dominated for the remainder of the fight, losing by TKO in the third round after being knocked down three times in the round.

Haggerty's next fight was against the Japanese opponent Taiki Naito at ONE Championship: Big Bang 2. He won the fight by unanimous decision, scoring a knockdown in both the first and the second round.

Haggerty was scheduled to face former ONE Flyweight Kickboxing world title challenger Elias Mahmoudi at ONE on TNT 4 on 28 April 2021. Their fight was cancelled due to COVID-19 travel restrictions and Haggerty was unable to make it to the bout.

After this Haggerty was due to face Jonno Chipchase on Roar Combat League, though the fight was pulled shortly after. Haggerty faced Arthur Meyer for the ISKA Muay Thai Lightweight World title at Siam Warriors Superfights on 20 November 2021. He won the fight by a second-round knockout.

Haggerty faced Mongkolpetch Petchyindee Academy at ONE: Bad Blood on 11 February 2022. He won the bout via unanimous decision and was awarded a Performance of the Night bonus.

Haggerty was booked to face Walter Goncalves in the quarterfinals of the ONE Muay Thai Flyweight Grand Prix at ONE 157 on 20 May 2022. However, close to the fight Haggerty pulled out of the fight citing health reasons and was replaced by Josue Cruz.

Haggerty was expected to face Amir Naseri in a ONE Muay Thai Flyweight Grand Prix alternate bout at ONE on Prime Video 1 on 27 August 2022. He withdrew from the fight due to a non-COVID related illness on 24 August.

Haggerty revealed that he had been considering a move into MMA with the promotion ahead of his ONE on Prime Video 4 bout, saying "I think that's what they're going to expect me to do like you said, but I feel like the wrestling, the jujitsu, etc, is getting so much better in the UK. You know, people flying abroad to get the work in, and yeah, people are just going to try and take me down, and hopefully, they just walk into a knee.

Haggerty faced Vladimir Kuzmin on 19 November 2022 at ONE on Prime Video 4. At weigh-ins, Haggerty weigh in at 148 lbs, 3 pounds over the limit. The bout continued at a catchweight and Haggerty being fined 20% of his purse, which went to his opponent Kuzmin. He won the fight via majority decision.

Haggerty faced Nong-O Gaiyanghadao for the ONE Bantamweight Muay Thai World Championship on 22 April 2023 at ONE Fight Night 9. He won the bout and the title, knocking out Nong-O in the first round.

Haggerty was scheduled to face the ONE Bantamweight World Champion Fabrício Andrade for the vacant ONE Bantamweight Kickboxing World Championship at ONE Fight Night 15 on 6 October 2023. However, for unknown reasons, the bout was moved to main event at ONE Fight Night 16 on 4 November. He won the fight by a second-round knockout, becoming a two-sport world champion.

Haggerty defended his ONE Bantamweight Muay Thai World Championship against Felipe Lobo on 17 February 2024 at ONE Fight Night 19, winning the bout via TKO stoppage in the third round.

Haggerty made his second ONE Bantamweight Muay Thai World Championship defense against Superlek Kiatmuu9 at ONE 168 on 6 September 2024. He lost the fight by a first-round knockout.

In the first defense of his kickboxing title, Haggerty faced Wei Rui on 20 February 2025 at ONE 171. He won the fight via unanimous decision.

Haggerty defended his ONE Bantamweight Kickboxing World Championship against Yuki Yoza at ONE Samurai 1 on April 29, 2026. He successfully retained his title, defeating Yoza via unanimous decision after five rounds.

Haggerty next faced former ONE Bantamweight Kickboxing champion Hiroki Akimoto at ONE Samurai 4, on October 17, 2026. He won the bout via TKO in the third round, dropping Akimoto with a punch and follow-up knee combination. While Akimoto did beat the count, his corner threw in the towel shortly afterwards.

== Titles and accomplishments ==
- ONE Championship
  - ONE Bantamweight Muay Thai World Champion (one time; former)
    - One successful title defense
  - ONE Bantamweight Kickboxing World Champion (one time; current)
    - Three successful title defenses
  - ONE Flyweight Muay Thai World Champion (one time; former)
  - Performance of the Night (three times) vs. Mongkolpetch Petchyindee, Nong-O Gaiyanghadao and Fabrício Andrade
  - First English Champion in ONE Championship
  - 2024: Ranked #2 Fight of the Year vs. Felipe Lobo
- WBC Muaythai
  - 2018 WBC Muaythai International Super Featherweight Champion.
- International Sport Karate Association
  - 2016 ISKA Muay Thai World Super Featherweight Champion
  - 2021 ISKA Muay Thai World Lightweight Champion
- Roar Combat League
  - 2017 Roar Combat League World Champion

== Fight record ==
Professional Muay Thai and Kickboxing record
26 Wins (17 (T)KO's), 5 Losses, 0 Draws
Date	Result	Opponent	Event	Location	Method	Round	Time
2026-10-17	Win	(Japan) Hiroki Akimoto	ONE Samurai 4	Tokyo, Japan	TKO (corner stoppage)	3	0:42
Defended the ONE Bantamweight Kickboxing World Championship.
2026-04-29	Win	(Japan) Yuki Yoza	ONE Samurai 1	Tokyo, Japan	Decision (Unanimous)	5	3:00
Defended the ONE Bantamweight Kickboxing World Championship.
2025-02-20	Win	(China) Wei Rui	ONE 171	Lusail, Qatar	Decision (Unanimous)	5	3:00
Defended the ONE Bantamweight Kickboxing World Championship.
2024-09-06	Loss	(Thailand) Superlek Kiatmuu9	ONE 168	Denver, United States	KO (Elbow)	1	0:49
Lost the ONE Bantamweight Muay Thai World Championship.
2024-02-17	Win	(Brazil) Felipe Lobo	ONE Fight Night 19	Bangkok, Thailand	TKO (Right cross)	3	0:45
Defended the ONE Bantamweight Muay Thai World Championship.
2023-11-04	Win	(Brazil) Fabrício Andrade	ONE Fight Night 16	Bangkok, Thailand	KO (punches)	2	1:57
Won the vacant ONE Bantamweight Kickboxing World Championship.
2023-04-22	Win	(Thailand) Nong-O Gaiyanghadao	ONE Fight Night 9	Bangkok, Thailand	KO (punches)	1	2:40
Won the ONE Bantamweight Muay Thai World Championship.
2022-11-19	Win	(Russia) Vladimir Kuzmin	ONE on Prime Video 4	Kallang, Singapore	Decision (Majority)	3	3:00
2022-02-11	Win	(Thailand) Mongkolpetch Petchyindee Academy	ONE: Bad Blood	Kallang, Singapore	Decision (Unanimous)	3	3:00
2021-11-20	Win	(France) Arthur Meyer	Siam Warriors Superfights	Dublin, Ireland	KO (Left hook + right cross)	2	1:00
Won the ISKA Muay Thai Lightweight World Championship.
2020-12-04	Win	(Japan) Taiki Naito	ONE Championship: Big Bang 2	Kallang, Singapore	Decision (Unanimous)	3	3:00
2020-01-10	Loss	(Thailand) Rodtang Jitmuangnon	ONE Championship: A New Tomorrow	Bangkok, Thailand	TKO (3 Knockdowns/Body Punches)	3	2:39
For the ONE Flyweight Muay Thai World Championship.
2019-08-02	Loss	(Thailand) Rodtang Jitmuangnon	ONE Championship: Dawn of Heroes	Pasay, Philippines	Decision (Unanimous)	5	3:00
Lost the ONE Flyweight Muay Thai World Championship.
2019-05-04	Win	(Thailand) Sam-A Gaiyanghadao	ONE Championship: For Honor	Jakarta, Indonesia	Decision (Unanimous)	5	3:00
Won the ONE Flyweight Muay Thai World Championship.
2019-01-18	Win	(Italy) Joseph Lasiri	ONE Championship: Eternal Glory	Jakarta, Indonesia	Decision (Unanimous)	3	3:00
2018-10-13	Loss	(Thailand) Superlek Kiatmuu9	Yokkao 31 & 32	United Kingdom	TKO (Doctor Stoppage/Cut)	2	3:00
2018-05-26	Win	(Spain) Isaac Araya	MuayThai Mayhem	United Kingdom	TKO	2	2:10
Won the WBC MuayThai super-featherweight International Title.
2018-03-10	Win	(United Kingdom) Keith McLachlan	YOKKAO 29	Bolton, England	KO (Left High Kick)	2	0:15
2017-10-15	Loss	(Thailand) Ja Kiatphontip	YOKKAO 28	Bolton, England	Decision	5	3:00
2017-02-11	Win	(Republic of Ireland) James O'Connell	Roar Combat League 5	Bolton, England	KO (Head kick)	1	0:20
2016-09-03	Win	(Italy) Geo Marchese	UCMMA 48	London, England	KO	1	
2016-04-15	Win	(Italy) Gery Bavetta	Muaythai Mayhem	United Kingdom	KO	3	
Wins ISKA Super-Featherweight Muay Thai World Title.
2015-06-20	Win	(United Kingdom) Ross Cochrane	MTGP 1	London, England	KO	1	
2014-11-08	Win	(Spain) Juan Jesús Antunez	WBC Muaythai international challenge	England	KO	2	
2014-06-17	Win	(Thailand)	Chaweng Muay Thai Boxing Stadium	Koh Samui, Thailand	KO (Elbow)	3	
2014-04-20	Win	(United Kingdom) Anthony Edwards		England	TKO (Doctor Stoppage)	4	
2014-04-14	Win	(Thailand)	Chaweng Muay Thai Boxing Stadium	Koh Samui, Thailand	KO (Right high kick)	1	
Legend: Win Loss Draw/No contest Notes

== See also ==
- List of male kickboxers
- List of multi-sport athletes
- List of multi-sport champions
- List of ONE Championship champions
