= ONE Fight Night 15 =

Combat sport events in 2023

ONE Fight Night 15: Le vs. Freymanov
- The poster for ONE Fight Night 15: Le vs. Freymanov
- Promotion: ONE Championship
- Date: October 7, 2023
- Venue: Lumpinee Boxing Stadium
- City: Bangkok, Thailand

Event chronology
ONE Friday Fights 36: Superball vs. Lobo	ONE Fight Night 15: Le vs. Freymanov	ONE Friday Fights 37: Bohic vs. Kacem

ONE Fight Night 15: Le vs. Freymanov was a combat sport event produced by ONE Championship that took place on October 7, 2023, at Lumpinee Boxing Stadium in Bangkok, Thailand.

== Background ==
A ONE Featherweight Muay Thai World Championship bout between current champion Tawanchai P.K.Saenchai and former ONE Featherweight Kickboxing champion Superbon Singha Mawynn was expected to headline the event. However, Superbon was forced to pulled out due to injured his leg. He was replaced by Jo Nattawut in a kickboxing bout. As a results, an interim ONE Featherweight World Championship bout between former champion Thanh Le (also former interim LFA Featherweight Champion) and Ilya Freymanov was promoted to the main event status.

A ONE Bantamweight Kickboxing World Championship for the vacant title between current ONE Bantamweight Muay Thai champion Jonathan Haggerty (also former ONE Flyweight Muay Thai champion) and current ONE Bantamweight World Champion Fabrício Andrade was scheduled for this event. Former champion Petchtanong Petchfergus was stripped of the title due to testing positive for both metenolone and boldenone, banned substance according to the World Anti-Doping Agency (WADA). However, for unknown reasons, the bout was moved to main event at ONE Fight Night 16 on November 4.

A ONE Strawweight Kickboxing World Championship bout between current champion Jonathan Di Bella and Danial Williams served as the co-main event.

ONE Flyweight Submission Grappling champion Mikey Musumeci completed in a non-title openweight grappling match against Shinya Aoki.

A strawweight bout between former champion Joshua Pacio and Mansur Malachiev took place at the event.

A flyweight bout between former ONE Flyweight World Championship challenger Danny Kingad and Hu Yong was scheduled for this event. However, Kingad withdraw from the bout due to an ankle injury and was replaced by Eko Roni Saputra.

== Results ==
Main card (Amazon Prime Video)
Weight class				Method	Round	Time	Notes
Featherweight	Thanh Le	def.	Ilya Freymanov	Submission (heel hook)	1	1:02	(Note: For the interim ONE Featherweight World Championship.)
Strawweight Kickboxing	Jonathan Di Bella (c)	def.	Danial Williams	Decision (unanimous) (50–45, 50–45, 50–45)	5	3:00	(Note: For the ONE Strawweight Kickboxing World Championship.)
Featherweight Kickboxing	Tawanchai P.K.Saenchai	def.	Jo Nattawut	Decision (unanimous) (29–28, 29–28, 29–28)	3	3:00
Openweight Submission Grappling	Mikey Musumeci	def.	Shinya Aoki	Submission (Achilles lock)	1	3:05
Strawweight	Joshua Pacio	def.	Mansur Malachiev	Decision (unanimous)	3	5:00
Lightweight	Zhang Lipeng	def.	Timofey Nastyukhin	TKO (punches)	1	3:18
Flyweight	Hu Yong	def.	Eko Roni Saputra	TKO (punches)	1	1:03
Catchweight (121 lbs) Muay Thai	Phetjeeja Lukjaoporongtom	def.	Celest Hansen	TKO (doctor stoppage)	3	1:01
Welterweight	Hiroyuki Tetsuka	def.	Jin Tae-ho	Submission (armbar)	1	4:45
Catchweight (174.5 lbs) Muay Thai	Shakir Al-Tekreeti	def.	Bampara Kouyate	Decision (unanimous)	3	3:00

== Bonus awards ==
The following fighters received $50,000 bonuses.

- Performance of the Night: Thanh Le, Mikey Musumeci and Zhang Lipeng

== See also ==
- 2023 in ONE Championship
- List of ONE Championship events
- List of current ONE fighters
