= ONE: Bad Blood =

Combat sport events in 2022

- The poster for ONE: Bad Blood
- Promotion: ONE Championship
- Date: February 11, 2022
- Venue: Singapore Indoor Stadium
- City: Kallang, Singapore

Event chronology
ONE: Only the Brave	ONE: Bad Blood	ONE: Full Circle

ONE: Bad Blood was a Combat sport event produced by ONE Championship that took place on February 11, 2022, at the Singapore Indoor Stadium in Kallang, Singapore.

== Background ==
Bibiano Fernandes was scheduled to make his second ONE bantamweight title defense against John Lineker in the main event. However, Lineker tested positive for COVID days before the event and the bout was pulled and However, the bout was moved to ONE: Lights Out.

An interim ONE Heavyweight World Championship bout between Anatoly Malykhin and Kiril Grishenko was scheduled for ONE: Only the Brave, but the bout was moved to this event and was promoted to the main event.

Former ONE Flyweight Muay Thai Champion Jonathan Haggerty will make his return to action when he faces #4-ranking Flyweight Muay Thai Mongkolpetch Petchyindee Academy.

A strawweight bout between former ONE Strawweight Champion Yosuke Saruta and Gustavo Balart was planned for the event. However, Saruta tested positive for COVID days before the event and the bout will be rescheduled.

A welterweight bout between former title challenger Ken Hasegawa and Murad Ramazanov was scheduled for the event. However, Hasegawa was injured and out of his clash with Murad Ramazanov, the bout is set to be rebooked.

The Filipina fighter Jenelyn Olsim was set to faces Jihin Radzuan of Malaysia in a women's atomweight bout. However, a two days before the event, Olsim withdrew from the bout, reportedly because she has suffered an injury during her training. She was replaced by Mei Yamaguchi.

== Results ==
Main Card (YouTube / ONE Super App)
Weight class				Method	Round	Time	Notes
Heavyweight	Anatoly Malykhin	def.	Kirill Grishenko	KO (punch)	2	3:42	(Note: For the interim ONE Heavyweight World Championship.)
Flyweight Muay Thai	Jonathan Haggerty	def.	Mongkolpetch Petchyindee	Decision (unanimous)	3	3:00
Bantamweight	Chen Rui	def.	Mark Abelardo	Decision (unanimous)	3	5:00
Catchweight (118 lbs)	Jihin Radzuan	def.	Mei Yamaguchi	Decision (unanimous)	3	5:00
Flyweight	Woo Sung Hoon	def.	Yodkaikaew Fairtex	TKO (punches)	1	0:18
Strawweight	Danial Williams	def.	Dejdamrong Sor Amnuaysirichoke	KO (punch to the body)	2	1:35
Lead Card (YouTube / Facebook / ONE Super App)
Heavyweight	Dustin Joynson	def.	Hugo Cunha	Decision (split)	3	5:00
Women's Atomweight	Lin Heqin	def.	Bi Nguyen	Decision (unanimous)	3	5:00
Heavyweight	Odie Delaney	def.	Thomas Narmo	Submission (hammerlock)	1	1:06
Bantamweight	Sunoto Peringkat	vs.	Tial Thang	No Contest (accidental knee to groin)	1	1:37	(Note: Accidental knee to groin rendered Peringkat unable to continue.)

== Bonus awards ==
The following fighters were awarded bonuses:

- $100,000 Performance of the Night: Anatoly Malykhin
- $50,000 Performance of the Night: Jonathan Haggerty and Woo Sung Hoon

== See also ==
- 2022 in ONE Championship
- List of ONE Championship events
- List of current ONE fighters
