= Jonathan Di Bella =

Italian-Canadian kickboxer (born 1996)

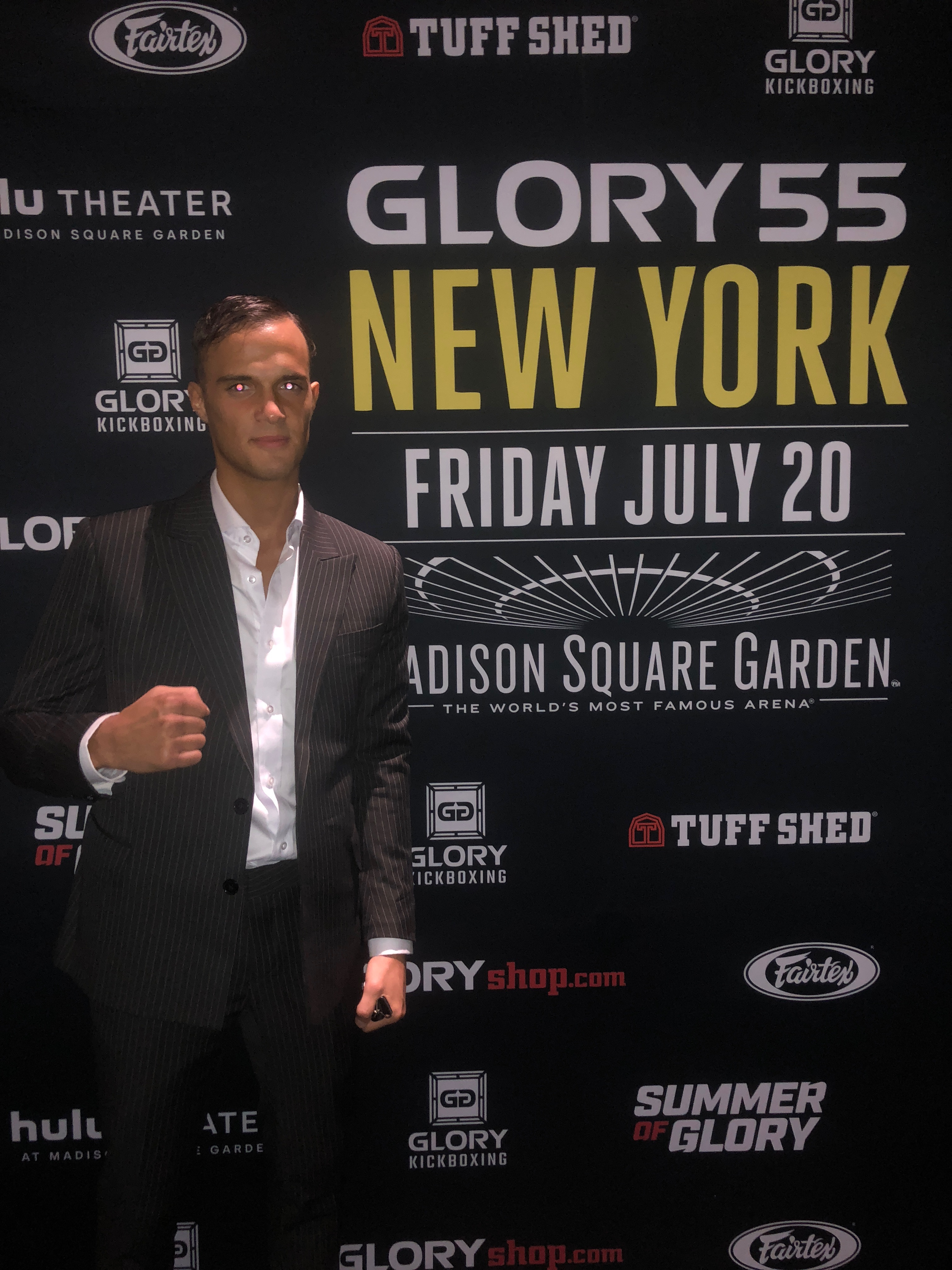
- Di Bella at Glory 55
- Born: August 18, 1996 (age 30); Montreal, Quebec, Canada
- Nationality: Canadian; Italian
- Height: 1.75 m (5 ft 9 in)
- Weight: 57 kg (126 lb; 9.0 st)
- Reach: 68 in (173 cm)
- Style: Kickboxing, boxing
- Stance: Southpaw
- Fighting out of: New York City, New York, U.S.
- Team: Di Bella Kickboxing
- Trainer: Angelo Di Bella
- Rank: Black belt in Kyokushin karate

Kickboxing record
- Total: 17
- Wins: 16
- By knockout: 4
- Losses: 1

Other information
- Spouse: Emely Elizabeth Rodriguez
- Boxing record from BoxRec

Jonathan Giovanni Di Bella (born August 18, 1996) is an Italian-Canadian kickboxer, currently signed with ONE Championship, where he is the current and two-time Strawweight Kickboxing World Champion. He was ranked as a top ten bantamweight kickboxer in the world by Beyond Kickboxing between November 2022 and May 2023. Di Bella began his young career in the five boroughs of New York City.

== Early life ==
Di Bella born in Montreal to an Italian family. Starting training Kicboxing and Kyokushin Karate at the age of 2 years old coached by his Father and Former World Kickboxing Champion Angelo Di Bella. Grew up training in both New York City and Montreal areas, where his father was fighting in the New York scene and fighting under and managed by the legendary Lou Neglia. Di Bella going back and forth between New York and Montreal where his parents own Di Bella Kickboxing gym. His first fight as an amateur kickboxer was in the Tri-State area in 2006. Di Bella also has 6 amateur boxing fights, where he is 6-0 (3 KOs) as his amateur kickboxing record finished at 20-0(13 KO's) His biggest accomplishment as teen was winning the 2014 IKF World Classic Muay Thai Championship Tournament in Orlando, Florida Disney World by winning all three bouts by KO.

== Kickboxing career ==
=== Early career ===
Di Bella began practicing martial arts at his father's Di Bella Kickboxing gym, where he acquired a Kyokushin karate black belt. He began his young career in the 5 boroughs of New York City. He would go on to win 20 consecutive fights as an amateur kickboxer, with 13 of those victories coming by way of stoppage. Di Bella made his professional kickboxing debut against David Weintraub at Battle of the Millenium 3 in Brooklyn, New York on June 10, 2016. He won the fight by a second-round technical knockout, as he stopped his opponent with low kicks, after he knocked him down twice with left straights.

=== Glory Kickboxing ===
Di Bella made his Glory debut against Will Calhoun at Glory 33: New Jersey on September 9, 2016, in what was his second professional appearance. He won the fight by a first-round technical knockout, due to doctor stoppage.

After he beat Pampos Grigoriou by unanimous decision at Battle of the Millennium 4 on May 12, 2017, Di Bella was booked to face Lennox Chance at Glory 43: New York on July 14, 2017. He once again won by unanimous decision.

Di Bella won two more bouts, a unanimous decision over Tommy Espinosa at Glory 48: New York on December 1, 2017 and a first-round knockout of Chris Johnson at Battle of the Millenium 5 on April 13, 2018, before he was given the chance to face Ahmad Ibrahim for the ISKA North American Lightweight title at Glory 55: New York on July 20, 2018. He captured the title by unanimous decision.

Di Bella made his fifth and final promotional appearance with Glory against Mohammed Lemjerdine at Glory 61: New York on November 2, 2018. He won the fight by unanimous decision.

Di Bella would then depart from Glory and face Dejaun Mishael Davis for the ISKA East Coast Featherweight title at Combat at the Garden on April 20, 2019. He won the fight by unanimous decision.

=== ONE Championship ===
On June 1, 2020 it was announced Di Bella signed a contract with ONE Championship. Di Bella faced Zhang Peimian for the vacant ONE Kickboxing Strawweight Championship at ONE 162 on October 21, 2022, in what was his debut with the promotion. He captured the vacant title by unanimous decision.

Di Bella made his first ONE Strawweight Kickboxing World Championship defense against Danial Williams at ONE Fight Night 15 on October 6, 2023. He won the bout via unanimous decision.

Di Bella was expected to defend his ONE Strawweight Kickboxing World Championship against Prajanchai P.K.Saenchaimuaythaigym at ONE Friday Fights 58 on April 5, 2024. He was stripped of his title after failing to meet the required hydration levels at the weigh-ins. The bout, now for the vacant title, was rescheduled for ONE Friday Fights 68 on June 28, 2024. Di Bella lost the fight by unanimous decision.

Di Bella faced Rui Botelho on December 7, 2024, at ONE Fight Night 26. He won the fight via unanimous decision.

Di Bella faced Sam-A Gaiyanghadao for the interim ONE Strawweight Kickboxing World Championship on March 23, 2025, at ONE 172. He won the title via unanimous decision.

Di Bella is scheduled to unify the ONE Strawweight Kickboxing World Championship against Prajanchai P.K.Saenchaimuaythaigym at ONE Fight Night 36 on October 3, 2025.

== Professional boxing career ==
Di Bella signed a promotional contract with Groupe Yvon Michel on June 9, 2023, after amassing a 2–0 record in professional boxing.

== Titles and accomplishments ==
=== Amateur ===
- International Kickboxing Federation
  - 2014 IKF World Junior Muay Thai Super Lightweight Championship
  - 2013 New York State Champion
  - 2013 Tri-State Champion
  - 2012 New York State Champion

=== Professional ===
- ONE Championship
  - ONE Strawweight Kickboxing World Championship (two times, current)
    - One successful title defense (first reign)
    - One successful title defense (second reign)
  - 2025 interim ONE Strawweight Kickboxing World Championship
  - 2025 ONE Championship Kickboxer of the Year
- International Sport Kickboxing Association
  - 2018 ISKA North American Lightweight Championship
  - 2019 ISKA East Coast Featherweight Championship
  - 2019 ISKA Intercontinental Championship
  - 2018 ISKA U.S.A Championship

== Kickboxing record ==
Professional kickboxing record
16 wins (4 (T)KOs), 1 loss, 0 draws
Date	Result	Opponent	Event	Location	Method	Round	Time
2026-12-12		(China) Wang Junguang	ONE 174	Shanghai, China			
Defending the ONE Strawweight Kickboxing World Championship.
2026-07-17	Win	(China) Zhang Peimian	ONE The Inner Circle 22, Lumpinee Stadium	Bangkok, Thailand	Decision (unanimous)	5	3:00
Defended the ONE Strawweight Kickboxing World Championship.
2025-10-03	Win	(Thailand) Prajanchai P.K.Saenchaimuaythaigym	ONE Fight Night 36	Bangkok, Thailand	Decision (unanimous)	5	3:00
Wins the ONE Strawweight Kickboxing World Championship.
2025-03-23	Win	(Thailand) Sam-A Gaiyanghadao	ONE 172	Saitama, Japan	Decision (unanimous)	5	3:00
Wins the interim ONE Strawweight Kickboxing World Championship.
2024-12-07	Win	(Portugal) Rui Botelho	ONE Fight Night 26	Bangkok, Thailand	Decision (unanimous)	3	3:00
2024-06-28	Loss	(Thailand) Prajanchai P.K.Saenchaimuaythaigym	ONE Friday Fights 68	Bangkok, Thailand	Decision (unanimous)	5	3:00
For the ONE Strawweight Kickboxing World Championship.
2023-10-06	Win	(Australia) Danial Williams	ONE Fight Night 15	Bangkok, Thailand	Decision (unanimous)	5	3:00
Defended the ONE Strawweight Kickboxing World Championship.
2022-10-21	Win	(China) Zhang Peimian	ONE 162	Kuala Lumpur, Malaysia	Decision (unanimous)	5	3:00
Wins the vacant ONE Strawweight Kickboxing World Championship
2019-12-06	Win	(United States) Nick Burgos	Combat at the Garden 2	New York City, United States	TKO (referee stoppage)	3	2:36
Wins ISKA Intercontinental Featherweight title.
2019-04-20	Win	(United States) Dejaun Mishael Davis	Combat at the Garden	New York City, United States	Decision (unanimous)	3	3:00
Wins ISKA East Coast Featherweight title.
2018-11-02	Win	(United States) Mohammed Lemjerdine	Glory 61: New York	New York City, United States	Decision (unanimous)	3	3:00
2018-07-20	Win	(United States) Ahmad Ibrahim	Glory 55: New York	New York City, United States	Decision (unanimous)	3	3:00
Wins ISKA North American Lightweight title.
2018-04-13	Win	(United States) Chris Johnson	Battle of the Millenium 5	New York City, United States	KO (high kick)	1	1:20
2017-12-01	Win	(United States) Tommy Espinosa	Glory 48: New York	New York City United States	Decision (unanimous)	3	3:00
2017-07-14	Win	(United States) Lennox Chance	Glory 43: New York	New York City, United States	Decision (unanimous)	3	3:00
2017-05-12	Win	(Cyprus) Pampos Grigoriou	Battle of the Millenium 4	New York City, United States	Decision (unanimous)	3	3:00
2016-09-09	Win	(United States) Will Calhoun	Glory 33: New Jersey	Trenton, New Jersey, United States	TKO (doctor stoppage)	1	3:00
2016-06-10	Win	(United States) David Weintraub	Battle of the Millenium 3	New York City, United States	TKO (low kicks)	2	
Legend: Win Loss Draw/no contest Notes

Amateur kickboxing record
20 wins (13 (T)KOs), 0 losses, 0 draws
Date	Result	Opponent	Event	Location	Method	Round	Time
2015-12-07	Win	(United States) Cornell Ward	Battle of the Millenium 2	New York City, New York, USA	TKO (corner stoppage)	2	
2014-07-13	Win	(Canada) Ethan Doucette	2014 IKF World Classic Amateur Kickboxing Championships, Final	Orlando, Florida, USA	KO	1	1:16
Wins IKF Junior Muay Thai Super Lightweight title.
2014-07-12	Win	(United States) Marquis Mike	2014 IKF World Classic Amateur Kickboxing Championships, Semi Final	Orlando, Florida, USA	TKO	2	2:00
2014-07-11	Win	(United States) Trevor Oden	2014 IKF World Classic Amateur Kickboxing Championships, Quarter Final	Orlando, Florida, USA	TKO	1	1:08
Legend: Win Loss Draw/no contest Notes

== Professional boxing record ==
2 fights	2 wins	0 losses
By knockout	1	0
By decision	1	0

No.	Result	Record	Opponent	Type	Round, time	Date	Location	Notes
2	Win	2–0	Jesus Omar Chavez Velazquez	KO	2 (4)	29 Jul 2022	Montreal Casino, Montreal, Quebec, Canada	
1	Win	1–0	Brian Lopez Salinas	UD	4 (4)	2 Jun 2022	Montreal Casino, Montreal, Quebec, Canada	
Legend: Win Loss Draw/no contest Notes

== See also ==
- List of male kickboxers
