= Zhang Peimian =

Chinese kickboxer

- Born: October 16, 2003 (age 23); Hepu County, Guangxi, China
- Native name: 张沛勉
- Other names: Fighting Rooster
- Height: 1.64 m (5 ft 4 1/2 in)
- Weight: 56 kg (123 lb; 8.8 st)
- Style: Kickboxing
- Stance: Orthodox
- Fighting out of: Guangdong, China
- Team: Shengli Fight Club
- Years active: 2018 - present

Kickboxing record
- Total: 26
- Wins: 19
- By knockout: 6
- Losses: 6
- By knockout: 0
- Draws: 1

Zhang Peimian (born October 16, 2003) is a Chinese kickboxer, currently competing in the strawweight division of ONE Championship. In October 2022, he was ranked as the tenth best bantamweight in the world by Beyond Kickboxing.

== Biography and career ==
=== Early career ===
Peimian made his professional debut against Li Ruidong at EM Legend 27 on January 20, 2018. He won the fight by decision. Peimian next faced Chen Jianman at the EM Legend Professional Fight League event, held on July 13, 2018. He once again won the fight by decision. Peimian faced Dmitry Pukach at Changping Cup event on September 20, 2018, in his third and final fight of the year. He won the fight by knockout.

Peimian faced Hu Haoyu at EM Legend 36 on January 12, 2019, in his first fight of the year. He won the bout by a second-round technical knockout. Peimian was booked to face Artsiom Varyvotski at the October 26, Beijing Combat event. He won the fight by a third-round technical knockout. Peimian was next scheduled to face Yang Wei at Kunlun Fight 88 on December 25, 2019. He won the fight by unanimous decision.

Peimian made two more appearances with Kunlun Fight in late 2020, following a break from the sport caused by the COVID-19 pandemic. On September 22, 2020, he fought to a draw with Zou Mingyang. A month later, on October 13, 2020, Peimian was able to knock Li Xiaochengye out with a left hook to the body. His undefeated record earned him a place in the November 26, Rise of the Warriors tournament. Although he was able to win the semifinal bout with Zewa Liluo by unanimous decision, Peimian came up short in the tournament final, as he lost a decision to Wu Zhendong.

Peimian took part in the 2021 Road To ONE China tournament, held on November 4, 2021. He was able to capture the tournament title with decision victories against Zewa Liluo in the semifinals and Hao Chenwei in the finals of the one-day tournament.

=== ONE Championship ===
Peimian made his ONE Championship debut against Josh "Timebomb" Tonna at ONE: Lights Out on March 11, 2022. He won the fight by a third-round technical knockout. His stoppage of Tonna earned Peimian a $50,000 bonus.

Zhang was booked to face Aslanbek Zikreev at ONE 159 on July 22, 2022. He won the fight by a closely contested unanimous decision.

Zhang faced Jonathan Di Bella for the vacant ONE Kickboxing Strawweight Championship at ONE 162 on October 21, 2022. Zhang was defeated by unanimous decision, in a closely contested bout, which he lost after he was knocked down with a head kick in the last round.

Peiman faced promotional newcomer Torepchi Dongak at ONE Fight Night 8 on March 25, 2023. He won the fight via unanimous decision. This win earned him the Performance of the Night award.

Zhang faced Rui Botelho on November 4, 2023, at ONE Fight Night 16. He lost the fight via split decision.

Zhang faced Aliff Sor.Dechapan at ONE Friday Fights 58 on April 5, 2024. He won the bout via unanimous decision.

Zhang faced Sam-A Gaiyanghadao on November 9, 2024, at ONE 169. He lost the fight via unanimous decision.

== Titles and accomplishments ==
- ONE Championship
  - 2021 Road to ONE China Tournament Winner
  - Performance of the Night (Two times) vs. (Josh Tonna and Torepchi Dongak)

Awards

- EM Legend
  - 2017 EM Legend Young Fighter of the Year Award

== Fight record ==
Professional Kickboxing Record
19 Wins (6 (T)KOs), 6 Losses, 1 Draw
| Date | Result | Opponent | Event | Location | Method | Round | Time |
| 2026-07-17 | Loss | (Italy) Jonathan Di Bella | ONE The Inner Circle 22, Lumpinee Stadium | Bangkok, Thailand | Decision (Unanimous) | 5 | 3:00 |
For the ONE Strawweight Kickboxing World Championship
| 2026-02-13 | Win | (United Kingdom) Ellis Barboza | ONE Friday Fights 142, Lumpinee Stadium | Bangkok, Thailand | Decision (Unanimous) | 3 | 3:00 |
| 2025-12-19 | Win | (Thailand) Thongpoon P.K.Saenchai | ONE Friday Fights 137, Lumpinee Stadium | Bangkok, Thailand | Decision (Unanimous) | 3 | 3:00 |
| 2025-09-26 | Loss | (Portugal) Rui Botelho | ONE Friday Fights 126, Lumpinee Stadium | Bangkok, Thailand | Decision (Split) | 3 | 3:00 |
| 2024-11-09 | Loss | (Thailand) Sam-A Gaiyanghadao | ONE 169 | Bangkok, Thailand | Decision (unanimous) | 3 | 3:00 |
| 2024-04-05 | Win | (Malaysia) Aliff Sor.Dechapan | ONE Friday Fights 58, Lumpinee Stadium | Bangkok, Thailand | Decision (Unanimous) | 3 | 3:00 |
| 2023-11-04 | Loss | (Portugal) Rui Botelho | ONE Fight Night 16 | Bangkok, Thailand | Decision (Split) | 3 | 3:00 |
| 2023-03-25 | Win | (Russia) Torepchi Dongak | ONE Fight Night 8 | Kallang, Singapore | Decision (unanimous) | 3 | 3:00 |
| 2022-10-21 | Loss | (Italy) Jonathan Di Bella | ONE 162 | Kuala Lumpur, Malaysia | Decision (Unanimous) | 5 | 3:00 |
For the vacant ONE Strawweight Kickboxing World Championship
| 2022-07-22 | Win | (Russia) Aslanbek Zikreev | ONE 159 | Kallang, Singapore | Decision (Unanimous) | 3 | 3:00 |
| 2022-03-11 | Win | (Australia) Josh Tonna | ONE: Lights Out | Kallang, Singapore | TKO (3 Knockdowns) | 2 | 2:11 |
| 2021-11-04 | Win | (China) Hao Chenwei | Road to ONE, Final | China | Decision | 5 | 3:00 |
Wins the Road to ONE China Tournament title
| 2021-11-04 | Win | (China) Zewa Liluo | Road to ONE, Semi Final | China | Decision (Unanimous) | 3 | 3:00 |
| 2021-03-27 | Win | (China) Liu Zhipeng | Wu Lin Feng 516 | China | Decision (Unanimous) | 3 | 3:00 |
| 2020-12-27 | Win | (China) Wang Qiang | Huya Kung Fu Festival 3 | Zhengzhou, China | Decision (Unanimous) | 3 | 3:00 |
| 2020-11-28 | Loss | (China) Wu Zhendong | Rise of the Warriors, Final | Jiaxing, China | Decision | 3 | 3:00 |
| 2020-11-28 | Win | (China) Zewa Liluo | Rise of the Warriors, Semi Final | Jiaxing, China | Decision (Unanimous) | 3 | 3:00 |
| 2020-10-13 | Win | (China) Li Xiaochengye | Kunlun Fight Professional League | China | KO (Left hook to the body) | 2 | 0:50 |
| 2020-09-22 | Draw | (China) Zou Mingyang | Kunlun Fight Professional League | Shenzhen, China | Decision | 3 | 3:00 |
| 2019-12-25 | Win | (China) Yang Wei | Kunlun Fight 88 | Yiwu, China | Decision (Unanimous) | 3 | 3:00 |
| 2019-10-26 | Win | (Belarus) Artsiom Varyvotski | Beijing Combat | Beijing, China | TKO (Punches) | 3 | 0:24 |
| 2019-01-12 | Win | (China) Hu Haoyu | EM Legend 36 | Shenzhen, China | TKO (Referee stoppage) | 2 | 1:56 |
| 2018-09-20 | Win | (Ukraine) Dmitry Pukach | Changping Cup | Beijing, China | KO | | |
| 2018-07-13 | Win | (China) Chen Jianman | EM Legend Professional Fight League | Shenzhen, China | Decision | 3 | 3:00 |
| 2018-01-20 | Win | (China) Li Ruidong | EM Legend 27 | Kunming, China | Decision | 3 | 3:00 |
Legend: Win Loss Draw/No contest Notes

Amateur Kickboxing Record
| Date | Result | Opponent | Event | Location | Method | Round | Time |
|---|---|---|---|---|---|---|---|
| 2018-12-15 | Win | (China) Jin Ximiao | EM Legend 35 | Emei, China | Decision | 3 | 3:00 |
| 2018-04-21 | Loss | (China) Sun Ao | EM Legend 30 | Emei, China | Decision (Unanimous) | 3 | 3:00 |
| 2018-02-10 | Win | (China) Wu Yancheng | EM Legend 28 | Guang'an, China | KO (liver kick) | 2 | |
| 2017-12-31 | Win | (China) | | Jinjiang, China | KO | | |
| 2017-11-18 | Win | (China) Tian Shiyu | EM Legend 25 | Sandu, China | TKO | | |
| 2017-10- | Win | (China) | | Chengdu, China | KO | 1 | |
Legend: Win Loss Draw/No contest Notes

== See also ==
- List of male kickboxers
