= Magomed Abdulkadirov =

Russian submission grappler

- Born: 3 December 1990 (age 35); Makhachkala, Dagestan ASSR, Russian SFSR, Soviet Union
- Nationality: Russian
- Height: 6 ft 0 in (1.83 m)
- Weight: 180 lb (82 kg; 13 st)
- Style: Submission Grappling; Brazilian Jiu-Jitsu
- Team: Club S. Abubakarov (Makhachkala); Team Nogueira (Dubai)
- Trainer: Yusup Saadulayev; Antônio Rodrigo Nogueira; Rafael Jaubert
- Rank: BJJ black belt

Magomed Magomedmirzaevich Abdulkadirov (Russian: Магомед Магомедмирзаевич Абдулкадиров; born 3 December 1990) is a Russian submission grappler and black belt Brazilian jiu-jitsu athlete. He is a multiple world champion in grappling and a Master of Sports of international class in grappling.

== Background ==
Abdulkadirov was born on 3 December 1990 in Makhachkala, Dagestan, Russia. At the age of 12, he began his journey in martial arts with freestyle wrestling. Abdulkadirov was first coached by Abdulla Magomedov, then he began performing in traditional jiu-jitsu, and Yusup Saadulaev began to train Abdulkadirov. At the age of 17, he began to consciously train and perform Brazilian jiu-jitsu and grappling.

== Brazilian jiu-jitsu career ==
In 2013, Abdulkadirov was awarded a brown belt in BJJ by Antônio Rodrigo Nogueira. In the same year, Magomed won the WPJJ World BJJ Championship, which was held in Abu Dhabi, UAE. In 2017, he won the Grand Slam tournament in Abu Dhabi among brown belts. He also won the Sharjah 2017 tournament in Dubai. A year later, he was awarded a black belt under the tutelage of Brazilian master Rafael Haubert.

== Grappling career ==
In 2015, Abdulkadirov won the ADCC European championship. Between 2014 and 2019, he became the United World Wrestling (UWW) world champion four times. He also won the Russian championships seven times.

=== ONE Championship ===
Abdulkadirov competed against Tye Ruotolo for the inaugural ONE Championship welterweight submission grappling title at ONE Fight Night 16 on 3 November 2023. He lost the match by decision.

== Championships and accomplishments ==
=== Brazilian jiu-jitsu ===
- WPJJ World BJJ Champion (2013)

=== Grappling ===
- 2015: ADCC European Championship — (gold) in 77 kg category (Turku)
