= ONE 172 =

Combat sport events in 2025

ONE 172: Takeru vs. Rodtang
- The poster for ONE 172: Takeru vs. Rodtang
- Promotion: ONE Championship
- Date: March 23, 2025
- Venue: Saitama Super Arena
- City: Saitama, Japan
- Attendance: 15,000
- Total gate: $2,000,000

Event chronology
ONE Friday Fights 101: Nakrob vs. Puengluang	ONE 172: Takeru vs. Rodtang	ONE Friday Fights 102: Rambong vs. Pompet (Canceled)

ONE 172: Takeru vs. Rodtang was a combat sports event produced by ONE Championship that took place on March 23, 2025, at the Saitama Super Arena in Saitama, Japan.

== Background ==
The event marked the promotion's first visit to Saitama and fifth to Japan since ONE 165 in January 2024.

A five-round flyweight kickboxing superfight between former ONE Flyweight Muay Thai World Champion Rodtang Jitmuangnon and former three-divisions K-1 World Champion Takeru Segawa headlined the event. The pair was previously scheduled to headline at ONE 165 in January 2024, but Rodtang withdrew from the bout due to injury.

An interim ONE Featherweight Kickboxing World Championship bout between the current ONE Featherweight Muay Thai World Champion Tawanchai P.K.Saenchai and former K-1 Super Lightweight and Welterweight Champion Masaaki Noiri served as the co-main event.

A ONE Flyweight World Championship rematch for the vacant title between former three-time champion Adriano Moraes and Yuya Wakamatsu took place at third title fights. The duo previously met at ONE: X in March 2022, which Moraes defended the title by third round submission.

An interim ONE Strawweight Kickboxing World Championship bout between former champions (also former ONE Flyweight and Strawweight Muay Thai World Champion) Sam-A Gaiyanghadao and Jonathan Di Bella took place the second of title fights.

A ONE Women's Atomweight Kickboxing World Championship bout between current champion Phetjeeja Lukjaoporongtom and former K-1 Women's Flyweight Champion Kana Morimoto took place the first title fights.

A ONE Bantamweight Muay Thai World Championship unification bout between then champion (also the current ONE Flyweight Kickboxing World Champion) Superlek Kiatmuu9 and interim champion Nabil Anane took place at the event. The duo previously met at ONE Friday Fights 22 in June 2023, which Superlek won by first round knockout. At the weigh-ins, Superlek failed the hydration test and came in at 146.25 pounds, 1.25 pounds over the bantamweight limit. As a results, Superlek was stripped of the title and the bout was switched to three-round non-title bout.

Adrian Lee and promotional newcomer Shozo Isojima were scheduled to meet in a lightweight MMA bout, but Isojima withdrew due to injury and was replaced by another newcomer Takeharu Ogawa.

At the weigh-ins, three fighters also failed to hydration test and missed weight for their respective fights:

- Former Glory Lightweight Champion Marat Grigorian weighed in at 155.75 pounds, 0.75 pounds over the featherweight limit and the bout was cancelled after Kaito Ono declined the catchweight bout.
- Ogawa weighed in at 173.5 pounds, 3.5 pounds over the lightweight limit and he was fined 20% of purse, which went to Lee.
- Suriyanlek Por.Yenying weighed in at 132.25 pounds, 0.25 pounds over the 132 pounds limit and he was fined the 20% of purse, which went to Ryusei Kumagai.

== Results ==
Main card (YouTube / Watch ONE)
Weight class				Method	Round	Time	Notes
Flyweight Kickboxing	Rodtang Jitmuangnon	def.	Takeru Segawa	KO (punch)	1	1:20
Featherweight Kickboxing	Masaaki Noiri	def.	Tawanchai P.K.Saenchai	TKO (punches)	3	1:55	(Note: For the interim ONE Featherweight Kickboxing World Championship.)
Flyweight	Yuya Wakamatsu	def.	Adriano Moraes	TKO (punches)	1	3:39	(Note: For the vacant ONE Flyweight World Championship.)
Strawweight Kickboxing	Jonathan Di Bella	def.	Sam-A Gaiyanghadao	Decision (unanimous)	5	3:00	(Note: For the interim ONE Strawweight Kickboxing World Championship.)
Women's Atomweight Kickboxing	Phetjeeja Lukjaoporongtom (c)	def.	Kana Morimoto	Decision (unanimous)	5	3:00	(Note: For the ONE Women's Atomweight Kickboxing World Championship.)
Bantamweight Muay Thai	Nabil Anane	def.	Superlek Kiatmuu9	Decision (unanimous)	3	3:00	(Note: Non-title bout, Superlek missed weight (146.25 lb).)
Atomweight Muay Thai	Nadaka Yoshinari	def.	Rak Erawan	KO (punch)	3	2:40
Lightweight	Shinya Aoki	def.	Eduard Folayang	Submission (armbar)	1	0:53
Bantamweight Kickboxing	Hiroki Akimoto	def.	John Lineker	Decision (split)	3	3:00
Lightweight	Adrian Lee	def.	Takeharu Ogawa	Submission (anaconda choke)	1	1:03	(Note: Ogawa missed weight (173.5 lb).)
Flyweight Muay Thai	Shimon Yoshinari	def.	Yodlekpet Or.Atchariya	Decision (unanimous)	3	3:00
Preliminary card (YouTube / Watch ONE)
Flyweight Kickboxing	Hyu Iwata	def.	Zakaria El Jamari	KO (knee)	1	2:13
Catchweight (132 lbs) Kickboxing	Ryusei Kumagai	def.	Suriyanlek Por.Yenying	Decision (unanimous)	3	3:00	(Note: Suriyanlek missed weight (132.5 lb).)

== Bonus awards ==
The following fighters received $50,000 bonuses:

- Performance of the Night: Rodtang Jitmuangnon, Masaaki Noiri, Yuya Wakamatsu and Adrian Lee

== See also ==
- 2025 in ONE Championship
- List of ONE Championship events
- List of current ONE fighters
- ONE Championship Rankings
