= ONE Fight Night 19 =

Combat sport events in 2024

ONE Fight Night 19: Haggerty vs. Lobo
- The poster for ONE Fight Night 19: Haggerty vs. Lobo
- Promotion: ONE Championship
- Date: February 17, 2024
- Venue: Lumpinee Boxing Stadium
- City: Bangkok, Thailand

Event chronology
ONE Friday Fights 52: Kulabdam vs. Lobo	ONE Fight Night 19: Haggerty vs. Lobo	ONE Friday Fights 53: Phetsukumvit vs. Kongsuk

ONE Fight Night 19: Haggerty vs. Lobo was a combat sport event produced by ONE Championship that took place on February 17, 2024, at Lumpinee Boxing Stadium in Bangkok, Thailand.

== Background ==
A ONE Bantamweight Muay Thai World Championship bout between current champion Jonathan Haggerty (also the ONE Bantamweight Kickboxing Champion and former ONE Flyweight Muay Thai Champion) and Felipe Lobo headlined the event.

A women's strawweight bout between Wondergirl Jaroonsak and Dayane de Souza Cardoso was expected to take place at the event. The fight was scheduled a mixed-rules that round 1 & 3 a Muay Thai rule and round 2 & 4 a MMA rule. However, Cardoso pulled out for unknown reason and was replaced by Martyna Kierczynska in a Muay Thai rule.

== Results ==
Fight card (Amazon Prime Video)
Weight class				Method	Round	Time	Notes
Bantamweight Muay Thai	Jonathan Haggerty (c)	def.	Felipe Lobo	TKO (punch)	3	0:45	(Note: For the ONE Bantamweight Muay Thai World Championship.)
Bantamweight Muay Thai	Saemapetch Fairtex	def.	Mohamed Younes Rabah	TKO (punches and elbow)	1	1:33
Strawweight	Lito Adiwang	def.	Danial Williams	Decision (unanimous)	3	5:00
Lightweight Muay Thai	Nauzet Trujillo	def.	Liam Nolan	Decision (unanimous)	3	3:00
Welterweight	Hiroyuki Tetsuka	def.	Abraão Amorim	Submission (armbar)	1	4:57
Featherweight Muay Thai	Luke Lessei	def.	Eddie Abasolo	Decision (split)	3	3:00
Women's Strawweight Muay Thai	Martyna Kierczyńska	def.	Wondergirl Jaroonsak	TKO (elbows and knees)	2	1:24
Strawweight	Mansur Malachiev	def.	Yosuke Saruta	Decision (unanimous)	3	5:00
Strawweight Muay Thai	Thongpoon P.K.Saenchai	def.	Timur Chuikov	TKO (three knockdowns)	1	1:37

== Bonus awards ==
The following fighters received $50,000 bonuses.

- Performance of the Night: Jonathan Haggerty, Saemapetch Fairtex, Martyna Kierczyńska and Thongpoon P.K.Saenchai

== See also ==
- 2024 in ONE Championship
- List of ONE Championship events
- List of current ONE fighters
- ONE Championship Rankings
