= ONE Fight Night 31 =

Combat sport events in 2025

ONE Fight Night 31: Kongthoranee vs. Nong-O 2
- The poster for ONE Fight Night 31: Kongthoranee vs. Nong-O 2
- Promotion: ONE Championship
- Date: May 3, 2025
- Venue: Lumpinee Boxing Stadium
- City: Bangkok, Thailand

Event chronology
ONE Friday Fights 106: Panrit vs. Suksawat	ONE Fight Night 31: Kongthoranee vs. Nong-O 2	ONE Friday Fights 107: Ortikov vs. Dedduanglek

ONE Fight Night 31: Kongthoranee vs. Nong-O 2 was a combat sports event produced by ONE Championship that took place on May 3, 2025, at Lumpinee Boxing Stadium in Bangkok, Thailand.

== Background ==
A flyweight Muay Thai rematch between Kongthoranee Sor.Sommai and former ONE Bantamweight Muay Thai World Champion Nong-O Hama headlined the event. The pairing previously met at ONE Fight Night 28 in February 2025, which Kongthoranee won by split decision.

A ONE Welterweight Submission Grappling World Championship bout between current champion Tye Ruotolo and Dante Leon served as the co-main event. The pairing met for the first time in Liverpool, England in 2020, where Leon won by decision. Their second meeting took place at FloGrapping promotion in 2021, which Ruotolo won by guillotine choke.

A lightweight Muay Thai bout between Liam Nolan and Nauzet Trujillo was scheduled for this event. However, Trujillo withdrew from the event due to injury and was replaced by promotional newcomer Abolfazl Alipourandi on a one-day notice.

At the weigh-ins, three fighters failed to hydration test and missed weight for their respective fights:

- Former ONE Welterweight World Champion Zebaztian Kadestam weighed in at 195.25 pounds, 10.25 pounds over the welterweight limit. As a results, the bout was cancelled as Kadestam did not have medical clearance to compete.
- Lucas Gabriel weighed in at 175.25 pounds, 5.25 pounds over the lightweight limit and he was fined a percent of his purse, which went to The Ultimate Fighter: China welterweight winner Zhang Lipeng.
- Ali Saldoev weighed in at 140.25 pounds, 5.25 pounds over the flyweight limit and he was fined a percent of his purse, which went to Jhordan Estupiñan.

== Fight card ==
Fight card (Amazon Prime Video)
Weight class				Method	Round	Time	Notes
Flyweight Muay Thai	Nong-O Hama	def.	Kongthoranee Sor.Sommai	Decision (unanimous)	3	3:00
Welterweight Submission Grappling	Tye Ruotolo (c)	def.	Dante Leon	Decision (unanimous)	1	10:00	(Note: For the ONE Welterweight Submission Grappling World Championship.)
Lightweight Muay Thai	Abolfazl Alipourandi	def.	Liam Nolan	KO (head kick)	1	0:59
Lightweight	Lucas Gabriel	def.	Zhang Lipeng	Decision (unanimous)	3	5:00	(Note: Gabriel missed weight (175.25 lb).)
Bantamweight Muay Thai	Abdulla Dayakaev	def.	Saemapetch Fairtex	TKO (knee and punches)	2	1:44
Flyweight Muay Thai	Akif Guluzada	def.	Sean Climaco	Decision (unanimous)	3	3:00
Flyweight Muay Thai	Jhordan Estupiñan	def.	Ali Saldoev	Decision (unanimous)	3	3:00	(Note: Saldoev missed weight (140.25 lb).)

== Bonus awards ==
The following fighters received $50,000 bonuses:

- Performance of the Night: Nong-O Hama

== See also ==
- 2025 in ONE Championship
- List of ONE Championship events
- List of current ONE fighters
- ONE Championship Rankings
