= ONE on Prime Video 3 =

Combat sport events in 2022

ONE on Prime Video 3: Lineker vs. Andrade
- The poster for ONE on Prime Video 3: Lineker vs. Andrade
- Promotion: ONE Championship
- Date: October 22, 2022
- Venue: Axiata Arena
- City: Kuala Lumpur, Malaysia

Event chronology
ONE 162: Zhang vs. Di Bella	ONE on Prime Video 3: Lineker vs. Andrade	ONE on Prime Video 4: Abbasov vs. Lee

ONE on Prime Video 3: Lineker vs. Andrade (also known as ONE Fight Night 3) was a combat sport event produced by ONE Championship that took place on October 22, 2022, at the Axiata Arena in Kuala Lumpur, Malaysia.

== Background ==
The event was originally expected to be headlined by a ONE Middleweight World Championship bout between current champion Reinier de Ridder (also the current ONE Light Heavyweight World Champion) and promotional newcomer Shamil Abdulaev. However, Abdulaev forced to withdraw due to not medically cleared and the bout was cancelled.

A ONE Bantamweight World Championship bout between then champion John Lineker and Fabrício Andrade headlined the event. At the weigh-ins, Lineker weighed in at 145.75 pounds, 0.75 pounds over the limit. As a result, Lineker was stripped of the title and only Andrade was eligible to win it.

The event featured two new title fights for the inaugural ONE Lightweight Muay Thai World Championship bout between the current ONE Lightweight Kickboxing Champion Regian Eersel vs. Sinsamut Klinmee and for the inaugural ONE Lightweight Submission Grappling World Championship bout between the 2022 ADCC World Championship 77kg gold medalist Kade Ruotolo vs. Uali Kurzhev took place at the event.

In the final of the ONE Flyweight Muay Thai World Grand Prix Tournament Final bout between Superlek Kiatmuu9 and Panpayak Jitmuangnon was expected to take place of the event. The winner will be the tournament champion and will be the next challenger ONE Flyweight Muay Thai title against Rodtang Jitmuangnon. They met previously 7 times in muay thai at Rajadamnern Stadium and Phetchbuncha Stadium, with Panpayak winning four fight encounters, Superlek winning two fight and one fight ended from draw. However, Superlek withdrawn from the event due to training injuries and the bout was postponed.

At weigh-ins, Lea Bivins missed weight, coming in at 116.74 lbs, 1.74 pounds over the limit, Jeremy Miado came in at 127 lbs, 2 pounds over the limit, with both bouts continuing at catchweights and Bivins and Miado paying fines to their opponents. Uali Kurzhev missed hydration twice and a catchweight of 174 lbs was established, with Kurzhev unable to win the inaugural ONE Lightweight Submission Grappling World Championship.

== Results ==
Main card (Amazon Prime Video)
Weight class				Method	Round	Time	Notes
Bantamweight	John Lineker	vs.	Fabrício Andrade	No Contest (accidental knee to groin)	3	2:44	(Note: For the vacant ONE Bantamweight World Championship (as Lineker missed weight and was stripped the title, only Andrade was eligible). Accidental knee to the groin rendered Lineker unable to continue.)
Lightweight Muay Thai	Regian Eersel	def.	Sinsamut Klinmee	Decision (split)	5	3:00	(Note: For the inaugural ONE Lightweight Muay Thai World Championship.)
Lightweight Submission Grappling	Kade Ruotolo	def.	Uali Kurzhev	Submission (heel hook)	1	4:26	(Note: For the inaugural ONE Lightweight Submission Grappling World Championship (as Kurzhev missed weight, only Ruotolo was eligible).)
Featherweight Kickboxing	Sitthichai Sitsongpeenong	def.	Mohammed Boutasaa	Decision (unanimous)	3	3:00
Featherweight	Shamil Gasanov	def.	Kim Jae-woong	Submission (rear-naked choke)	1	2:09
Lead card (YouTube / Watch ONE)
Catchweight (127 lbs)	Jeremy Miado	def.	Danial Williams	TKO (punches)	3	0:31	(Note: Miado missed weight (127 lbs))
Flyweight Muay Thai	Taiki Naito	def.	Amir Naseri	Decision (unanimous)	3	3:00
Bantamweight Muay Thai	Mehdi Zatout	def.	Asa Ten Pow	TKO (retirement)	1	3:00
Catchweight (116.74 lbs)	Noelle Grandjean	def.	Lea Bivins	TKO (punches)	1	4:01	(Note: Bivins missed weight (116.74 lbs))
Postliminary card (Only in Stadium and No live broadcast)
Featherweight	Yoon Chang-min	def.	Keanu Subba	Decision (unanimous)	3	5:00
Welterweight	Agilan Thani	def.	Ilja Stojanov	Submission (rear-naked choke)	2	1:48

== Bonus awards ==
The following fighters received $50,000 bonuses.

- Performance of the Night: Kade Ruotolo, Shamil Gasanov, Mehdi Zatout and Noelle Grandjean

== See also ==
- 2022 in ONE Championship
- List of ONE Championship events
- List of current ONE fighters
