= ONE on Prime Video 4 =

Combat sport events in 2022

ONE on Prime Video 4: Abbasov vs. Lee
- The poster for ONE on Prime Video 4: Abbasov vs. Lee
- Promotion: ONE Championship
- Date: November 19, 2022
- Venue: Singapore Indoor Stadium
- City: Kallang, Singapore

Event chronology
ONE on Prime Video 3: Lineker vs. Andrade	ONE on Prime Video 4: Abbasov vs. Lee	ONE 163: Akimoto vs. Petchtanong

ONE on Prime Video 4: Abbasov vs. Lee (also known as ONE Fight Night 4) was a Combat sport event produced by ONE Championship that took place on November 19, 2022 at the Singapore Indoor Stadium in Kallang, Singapore.

== Background ==
The organization originally targeted a return to Ryōgoku Kokugikan in Tokyo, Japan to host the event. However, the event was moved to Singapore Indoor Stadium in Kallang, Singapore after announced the main event.

A ONE Welterweight World Championship bout between current champion Kiamrian Abbasov and current ONE Lightweight World Champion Christian Lee (also 2019 ONE Lightweight World Grand Prix Champion) headlined the event. At the weigh-ins, Abbasov weighed in at 186.25 pounds, 1.25 pounds over the limit. As a result, Abbasov was stripped of the title and only Lee was eligible to win it.

A ONE Flyweight Muay Thai World Championship bout between current champion Rodtang Jitmuangnon and current ONE Strawweight Muay Thai Champion Joseph Lasiri took place at the event.

A middleweight bout between former ONE Middleweight and Light Heavyweight World Champion Aung La Nsang and former UFC and WSOF Middleweight title contender Yushin Okami was expected to take place at the event. However, the bout was moved to ONE 163 on same day.

A bantamweight bout between Kwon Won Il and Mark Abelardo was scheduled to take the event. However, on November 4, it was announced that the bout will be moved to ONE 163.

At the weigh-ins, Bibiano Fernandes, Stephen Loman and Jonathan Haggerty all failed hydration test and were forced to take catchweights. Fernandes weighed in at 151.5 lbs, 6.5 pounds over the limit, Loman came in at 153.25 lbs, 8.25 lbs over the bantamweight limit, and Haggerty at 148 lbs, 3 pounds over the limit. The bout proceeded at catchweight with Haggerty being fined 20% of his purse, which went to his opponent Vladimir Kuzmin. Fernandes and Loman scheduled to meet but to both were unable to make weight in the bantamweight (135 – 145 lbs) and the bout agreed to 153.25 lbs catchweight.

== Results ==
Main card (Amazon Prime Video)
Weight class				Method	Round	Time	Notes
Catchweight (186.25 lbs)	Christian Lee	def.	Kiamrian Abbasov	TKO (elbows and punches)	4	4:20	(Note: For the vacant ONE Welterweight World Championship (as Abbasov missed weight and was stripped of the title, only Lee was eligible).)
Flyweight Muay Thai	Rodtang Jitmuangnon (c)	def.	Joseph Lasiri	Decision (unanimous) (50–43, 50–43, 50–43)	5	3:00	(Note: For the ONE Flyweight Muay Thai World Championship.)
Catchweight (153.25 lbs)	Stephen Loman	def.	Bibiano Fernandes	Decision (unanimous)	3	5:00	(Note: The pairing failed to make weight in the bantamweight division and agreed to compete in the 153.25 lbs catchweight.)
Welterweight Muay Thai	Cosmo Alexandre	def.	Juan Cervantes	KO (elbow)	2	1:23
Bantamweight	Kim Jae Woong	def.	Kevin Belingon	TKO (punches)	1	2:33
Lead card (YouTube / Watch ONE)
Catchweight (148 lbs) Muay Thai	Jonathan Haggerty	def.	Vladimir Kuzmin	Decision (majority) (29–28, 29–28, 29–29)	3	3:00	(Note: Haggerty missed weight (148 lbs).)
Welterweight	Ruslan Emilbek Uulu	def.	Isi Fitikefu	Decision (split)	3	5:00
Women's Atomweight Submission Grappling	Danielle Kelly	def.	Mariia Molchanova	Submission (rear-naked choke)	1	2:15
Lightweight Muay Thai	Liam Nolan	def.	Eddie Abasolo	Decision (unanimous) (30–28, 30–27, 30–27)	3	3:00

== Bonus awards ==
The following fighters received $50,000 bonuses.

- Performance of the Night: Christian Lee, Cosmo Alexandre and Danielle Kelly

== See also ==
- 2022 in ONE Championship
- List of ONE Championship events
- List of current ONE fighters
