= Fabrício Andrade =

Brazilian mixed martial artist

- Born: Fabrício de Andrade; 10 October 1997 (age 29); Fortaleza, Ceará, Brazil
- Other names: Wonder Boy
- Height: 5 ft 7 1/2 in (1.71 m)
- Weight: 145 lb (66 kg; 10 st 5 lb)
- Division: Bantamweight; Featherweight
- Reach: 71.1 in (181 cm)
- Style: Muay Thai, Kickboxing
- Fighting out of: Fortaleza, Ceará, Brazil
- Team: Tiger Muay Thai; Evolve MMA; Marrok Force; HIIT studio
- Years active: 2014–present

Kickboxing record
- Total: 24
- Wins: 20
- By knockout: 7
- Losses: 4

Mixed martial arts record
- Total: 14
- Wins: 10
- By knockout: 6
- By submission: 2
- By decision: 2
- Losses: 3
- By knockout: 1
- By submission: 1
- By decision: 1
- No contests: 1

Other information
- Mixed martial arts record from Sherdog

Fabrício de Andrade (born October 10, 1997) is a Brazilian mixed martial artist and former Muay Thai kickboxer, who competes in the Bantamweight division of ONE Championship, where he was the ONE Bantamweight World Champion from 2023 to 2025.

== Background ==
Andrade was born in Fortaleza, where growing up was dangerous, and there weren’t many opportunities for young people in the region to leave and further themselves, but when Andrade found Muay Thai at the age of 13, he knew this could be his ticket to a better life. The Brazilian quickly developed a true passion for the sport, and soon, it transformed him both physically and mentally. Andrade trains out of Tiger Muay Thai in Phuket and has trained with the who’s who of the UFC champions in the past few years, like Petr Yan and Alexander Volkanovski.

== Mixed martial arts career ==
=== ONE Championship ===
Andrade made his debut against Mark Abelardo on July 31, 2020, at ONE: No Surrender. He won the fight via a rear-naked choke technical submission in the second round.

Andrade faced Shoko Sato on January 22, 2021 and aired on February 5, 2021, at ONE: Unbreakable 3. He won the fight via unanimous decision.

Andrade faced Li Kai Wen on December 3, 2021 and aired on December 17, 2021, at ONE: Winter Warriors II. He won the fight via technical knockout in the first round.

Andrade faced Jeremy Pacatiw on February 25, 2022, at ONE: Full Circle. He won the fight via knee to the body knockout in the first round.

Andrade faced Kwon Won Il on June 3, 2022, at ONE 158. He won the fight via a body kick knockout in the first round. This win earned him the Performance of the Night award.

Andrade faced John Lineker for the ONE Bantamweight World Championship on October 22, 2022, at ONE on Prime Video 3. At weigh-ins, John Lineker missed weight, coming in at 145.75 lbs, 0.75 pounds over the limit. Lineker was stripped of the title and the bout proceeded at a catchweight with only Andrade being able to win the title. Andrade also got 20% of his purse. During the beginning of the third round, Andrade accidentally connected with a strike to the groin of Lineker, who could not continue. The fight was declared a no contest.

A rematch between Lineker and Andrade for the vacant ONE Bantamweight World Championship took place on February 25, 2023, at ONE Fight Night 7. He won the bout and title by technical knockout after Lineker's corner stopped the fight after the fourth round.

In the first title defense, Andrade faced Kwon Won-il in a rematch on January 24, 2025, at ONE 170. He won the fight via first round technical knockout and this win earned the $50,000 Performance of the Night bonus.

== Kickboxing career ==
Before signing with ONE Championship, Andrade competed in kickboxing and muay thai in his native Brazil and China.

=== ONE Championship ===
Andrade was initially scheduled to face Jonathan Haggerty for the vacant ONE Bantamweight Kickboxing World Championship at ONE Fight Night 15 on October 7, 2023. However, the bout was moved to headline ONE Fight Night 16 on November 4, 2023. He lost the bout via knockout in the second round.

== Championships and accomplishments ==
- ONE Championship
  - ONE Bantamweight World Championship (One time; former)
    - One successful title defense
  - Performance of the Night (One time) vs. Kwon Won Il

== Mixed martial arts record ==
Professional record breakdown
14 matches	10 wins	3 losses
By knockout	6	1
By submission	2	1
By decision	2	1
No contests	1	

Res.	Record	Opponent	Method	Event	Date	Round	Time	Location	Notes
Loss	10–3 (1)	Enkh-Orgil Baatarkhuu	Submission (rear-naked choke)	ONE Fight Night 38	December 6, 2025	4	3:29	Bangkok, Thailand	Lost the ONE Bantamweight Championship (145 lb).
Win	10–2 (1)	Kwon Won-il	TKO (punch to the body)	ONE 170	January 24, 2025	1	0:42	Bangkok, Thailand	Defended the ONE Bantamweight Championship (145 lb). Performance of the Night.
Win	9–2 (1)	John Lineker	TKO (corner stoppage)	ONE Fight Night 7	February 25, 2023	4	5:00	Bangkok, Thailand	Won the vacant ONE Bantamweight Championship (145 lb).
NC	8–2 (1)	John Lineker	NC (accidental knee to groin)	ONE on Prime Video 3	October 22, 2022	3	2:44	Kuala Lumpur, Malaysia	For the vacant ONE Bantamweight Championship (145 lb). Lineker missed weight (145.75 lb) and was stripped of the title. Only Andrade was eligible to win the title. Accidental knee to the groin rendered Lineker unable to continue.
Win	8–2	Kwon Won-il	KO (body kick)	ONE 158	June 3, 2022	1	1:02	Kallang, Singapore	Performance of the Night.
Win	7–2	Jeremy Pacatiw	KO (knee to the body)	ONE: Full Circle	February 25, 2022	1	1:37	Kallang, Singapore	
Win	6–2	Li Kaiwen	TKO (punches)	ONE: Winter Warriors II	December 17, 2021	1	4:41	Kallang, Singapore	
Win	5–2	Shoko Sato	Decision (unanimous)	ONE: Unbreakable 3	February 5, 2021	3	5:00	Kallang, Singapore	
Win	4–2	Mark Abelardo	Technical Submission (rear-naked choke)	ONE: No Surrender	July 31, 2020	2	1:11	Bangkok, Thailand	Catchweight (148 lb) bout.
Win	3–2	Lige Teng	Decision (unanimous)	WLF W.A.R.S. 33	May 17, 2019	3	5:00	Zhengzhou, China	Featherweight debut.
Win	2–2	Xiatiha Zhumatai	Submission (rear-naked choke)	Kunlun Fight 71	April 1, 2018	2	3:23	Qingdao, China	Flyweight bout.
Loss	1–2	Wu Xiaolong	Decision	Kunlun Fight MMA 15	October 3, 2017	3	5:00	Alashan, China	
Loss	1–1	Zelimkhan Betergaraev	TKO (punches)	WFCA 17: Battle in Kazakhstan	March 23, 2016	2	2:36	Pavlodar, Kazakhstan	Catchweight (140 lb) bout.
Win	1–0	Markinho Guerreiro	TKO (punches)	Mix Fight Brazil 2	September 19, 2014	2	2:36	Fortaleza, Brazil	Bantamweight debut.

== Kickboxing and Muay Thai record ==
Professional Kickboxing Record
20 Wins (7 (T)KO's), 4 Losses
Date	Result	Opponent	Event	Location	Method	Round	Time
2023-11-04	Loss	(United Kingdom) Jonathan Haggerty	ONE Fight Night 16	Kallang, Singapore	KO (punches)	2	1:57
For the vacant ONE Bantamweight Kickboxing World Championship.
2019-08-31	Win	(China) Jin Ying	Wu Lin Feng 2019: WLF -67kg World Cup 2019-2020 3rd Group Stage	Zhengzhou, China	TKO (Doctor stoppage)	3	
2019-07-27	Win	(China) Hu Zheng	Wu Lin Feng 2019: WLF -67kg World Cup 2019-2020 2nd Group Stage	Zhengzhou, China	Decision (Unanimous)	3	3:00
2019-03-30	Win	(China) Zhao Chuanlin	Wu Lin Feng 2019: WLF x Lumpinee - China vs Thailand	Zhengzhou, China	Decision (Unanimous)	3	3:00
2018-12-01	Loss	(China) Zhu Shuai	Wu Lin Feng 2019, -60 kg Contender Tournament Semi Final	Zhengzhou, China	KO (Left Hook)	2	1:50
2018-11-07	Win	(China) Zhang Lanpei	Wu Lin Feng 2018: WLF x KF1	Hong Kong	Decision	3	3:00
2018-09-01	Win	(China) Chen Yong	Wu Lin Feng 2018: WLF -67kg World Cup 2018-2019 3rd Round	Zhengzhou, China	Decision (Unanimous)	3	3:00
2018-07-07	Win	(China) Fang Feida	Wu Lin Feng 2018: WLF -67kg World Cup 2018-2019 1st Round	Zhengzhou, China	Decision	3	3:00
2018-06-02	Win	(China) Lu Pinbo	Wu Lin Feng 2018: Yi Long VS Saiyok	Chongqing, China	TKO (Knee to the body)	2	
2017-11-05	Win	(China) Zhang Hua	Kunlun Fight 66	Wuhan, China	KO	2	
2017-09-02	Win	(China) Peng Shuai	Kunlun Hero City	China	TKO	1	
2017-04-08	Win	(Brazil) Eduardo Terceiro	Coronel Combate	Fortaleza, Brazil			
2017-03-18	Win	(Brazil)	NKB	Fortaleza, Brazil	KO		
Defends the Ceara State -60kg title.
2016-12-02	Win	(Brazil) Douglas Nunes	WGP Kickboxing 35	Fortaleza, Brazil	Decision (Unanimous)	3	3:00
2016-09-24	Win	(Brazil)		Brazil	KO (High kick + knees)		
2016-07-23	Win	(Brazil) Pedro Rodrigues	Aspera Kickboxing	Fortaleza, Brazil	TKO (Left Hook to the body)		
Legend: Win Loss Draw/No contest Notes

== See also ==
- List of current ONE fighters
