= Rodtang Jitmuangnon =

Thai Muay Thai fighter (born 1997)

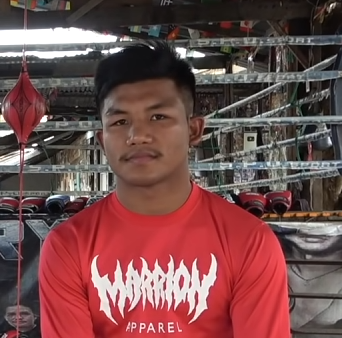
- Rodtang in 2021
- Born: Tinnakorn Srisawat; July 23, 1997 (age 29); Pa Phayom, Phatthalung, Thailand
- Native name: ทินกร ศรีสวัสดิ์
- Nickname: The Iron Man; The Tank
- Height: 168 cm (5 ft 6 in)
- Division: Featherweight; Super Featherweight; Flyweight (135 lbs) (ONE)
- Reach: 165 cm (65 in)
- Style: Muay Thai (Muay Bouk / Muay Mat)
- Stance: Orthodox
- Fighting out of: Bangkok, Thailand
- Team: Jitmuangnon Gym (2011–present); Looksaikongdin Gym; Fairtex (2020–2022)
- Years active: c. 2005–present

Kickboxing record
- Total: 329
- Wins: 274
- Losses: 45
- Draws: 10

Tinnakorn Srisawat (Thai: ทินกร ศรีสวัสดิ์; born July 23, 1997), known professionally as Rodtang Jitmuangnon (Thai: รถถัง จิตรเมืองนนท์) is a Thai professional Muay Thai fighter and kickboxer. A professional since 2013, he currently competes in the Flyweight division of ONE Championship where he is the former and longest-reigning ONE Flyweight Muay Thai World Champion. As of September 22, 2026, Jitmuangnon is ranked #2 in the ONE Flyweight Muay Thai rankings. In Muay Thai, he is a former Max Muay Thai 125 lb champion, and Omnoi Stadium 130 lbs champion. As a kickboxer, he formerly competed in the Featherweight division of Real Impact Sports Entertainment (RISE), where he was a Featherweight title challenger.

Rodtang is one of the highest-paid Muay Thai fighters in the world. Outside his competitive fighting career, Rodtang is the brand ambassador of several companies, including the Malaysian brand Amar Amran and Eminers.

== Biography and career ==
Rodtang started training Muay Thai at the age of 7. He had his first Muay Thai fight at the age of 8 to make money and help his family. At 14, he moved to Bangkok to join the Jitmuangnon gym.

On January 2, 2016, Rodtang won his first Muay Thai title when he defeated Petchprakan Kor. Klanbut by decision to claim the MAX Muay Thai 125 lb Championship. On February 6, 2016, he successfully defended his MAX 125 lb title belt against Petchprakan, winning by decision once again.

On July 29, 2017, he defeated Chai Sor Jor Toypadriew to win the vacant Omnoi Stadium 130 lb title. Rodtang retained the title on April 28, 2018 by defeating Phetnamngam Aor Kwanmuang.

On June 16, 2018, Rodtang faced Japanese kickboxing superstar Tenshin Nasukawa under kickboxing rules at Rise 125 in Tokyo, the fight was very exciting and contested. The judges gave a draw after five rounds and an extra round had to be fought. Rodtang lost that round and the fight, but some observers thought he had done enough to get the win prior to that.

In August 2018, Rodtang faced Chorfah Tor Sangtiennoi. This fight would later be elected Rajadamnern Stadium Best Fight of the Year.

Throughout 2017 and 2018, Rodtang went on a 10-fight winning streak in the stadiums which culminated in a fight against Rungkit Morbeskamala for the vacant Rajadamnern 130 lb title. Rodtang lost by decision.

On August 16, 2019, Rodtang faced Saeksan Or. Kwanmuang in the Songkhla Province, the fight was deemed underwhelming considering the fight style of the two participants. The rematch a month later was the back and forth war fans expected and received the award for Fight of the year at Rajadamnern Stadium.

On January 31, 2020, Rodtang faced Yodlekpet Or. Pitisak in the biggest Muay Thai card of the year in Phuket. Despite a size differential and a side bet of 1 million baht from the Teeded99 camp in play, Rodtang dominated his opponent and won a clear decision against arguably one of his best opponents yet.

Rodtang suffered his first loss since October 25, 2018 against Kaonar P.K.SaenchaiMuaythaiGym at Rajadamnern Stadium on February 27, 2020.

He was able to avenge his loss to Kaonar in a rematch at the R1 UFA event held in World Siam Stadium on October 5, 2020, winning the five-round decision.

On November 24, 2020, Yokkao founder, Philip Villa, announced on Instagram that Rodtang had signed a three-year sponsorship deal with his Muay Thai brand. His camp mate, Nuenglanlek Jitmuangnon also signed a three-year sponsorship deal with the brand.

=== ONE Championship ===
After signing with ONE Championship, Rodtang made his ONE Super Series debut against Sergio Wielzen on September 22, 2018 at ONE Championship: Conquest of Heroes in Jakarta. He defeated Wielzen by unanimous decision.

==== ONE Flyweight Muay Thai World Champion ====
On August 2, 2019 at ONE Championship: Dawn of Heroes in Manila, Rodtang faced Jonathan Haggerty for the ONE Flyweight Muay Thai World Championship after Haggerty previously called him out at ONE Championship: For Honor. After a slow start to the fight, Rodtang knocked Haggerty down in the fourth round and went on to win the fight by unanimous decision, also being crowned the new ONE Flyweight Muay Thai World Champion. In his first title defense, Rodtang defeated Walter Goncalves by split decision at ONE Championship: Century on October 13, 2019.

Rodtang then made his second title defense of the ONE Flyweight Muay Thai World Championship in a rematch against Jonathan Haggerty at ONE Championship: A New Tomorrow on January 10, 2020. In a fight where he floored Haggerty a total of 4 times, including a liver shot in the first round, Rodtang went on to retain his ONE Flyweight Muay Thai Title with a third-round TKO victory after delivering 3 knockdowns in that same round.

Rodtang next faced Petchdam Petchyindee Academy for a third time as he is scheduled to defend the ONE Flyweight Muay Thai World Championship a third time at ONE Championship: No Surrender on July 31, 2020. He defeated Petchdam and retained the title by majority decision after five rounds.

On October 5, 2020, Rodtang faced Kaonar P.K.SaenchaiMuaythaiGym in a rematch which was arranged to raise money for charity. Rodtang won the fight via unanimous decision.

A tenured Muay Thai fighter, Rodtang was scheduled to make his kickboxing debut against Alejandro Rivas at ONE Championship: Fists Of Fury on February 26, 2021. Rivas was later replaced by Tagir Khalilov, whom Rodtang beat by split decision.

He was expected to face Jacob Smith at ONE on TNT 1 on April 7, 2021. However, Smith was later pulled from the fight and replaced with Danial Williams. Rodtang defeated Williams by unanimous decision.

==== Special-rules fight with Demetrious Johnson ====
On September 15, 2021, it was announced that Rodtang would face the former UFC Flyweight Champion and 2019 ONE Flyweight Grand-Prix Champion, Demetrious Johnson. The fight was scheduled to take place on December 5, 2021 under special rules, and headlined the ONE: X event. Rounds 1 and 3 were contested under the ONE Muay Thai ruleset, and rounds 2 and 4 were contested under the ONE MMA ruleset. However, due to the pandemic shutdowns, the event was rescheduled for March 26, 2022. Rodtang lost the bout after being choked unconscious via a rear-naked choke in the second round.

==== 2022 ONE Muay Thai Flyweight GP ====
The bout with Jacob Smith was rebooked to serve as a quarterfinal bout of the ONE Muay Thai Flyweight Grand Prix at ONE 157 on May 20, 2022. He won the bout via unanimous decision. This win earned Rodtang his first Performance of the Night bonus award.

Rodtang was expected to face Savvas Michael in the tournament semifinals at ONE on Prime Video 1 on August 27, 2022. Two days before the bout was supposed to take place, Rodtang failed to provide a sample for a mandatory hydration test and was not permitted to weigh in. Rodtang withdrew from the fight on August 25, due to illness.

==== Continued title reign ====
Rodtang made his fourth defense title against the reigning ONE Strawweight Muay Thai champion Joseph Lasiri at ONE on Prime Video 4 on November 19, 2022. He defended the title via unanimous decision.

Rodtang was scheduled to face Daniel Puertas in a kickboxing match on January 14, 2023, at ONE on Prime Video 6. However, Puertas faced Superlek Kiatmuu9 for the vacant ONE Flyweight Kickboxing World Championship and Rodtang instead faced Jiduo Yibu. At weigh-ins, Rodtang weighed in at 136.5 pounds, 1.5 pounds over the flyweight limit. The bout proceeded at catchweight with Rodtang fined 20% of his purse, which went to his opponent Yibu. He won the fight via unanimous decision.

Rodtang was scheduled to challenge Superlek Kiatmuu9 for the ONE Flyweight Kickboxing World Championship at ONE Fight Night 8 on March 25, 2023. However, Rodtang withdraw from the bout due to injury and was replaced by Danial Williams.

Rodtang defended his title against Edgar Tabares on May 5, 2023, at ONE Fight Night 10. He defeated Tabares in the second round by KO via elbow. The win earned him a $100,000 Performance of the Night bonus.

Rodtang lost by decision to Superlek Kiatmuu9 at ONE Friday Fights 34 on September 22, 2023, but Superlek missed weight so Rodtang's title was not in contention.

Rodtang was scheduled to face Takeru Segawa in a kickboxing superfight on January 28, 2024, at ONE 165. However, Rodtang withdrew from the bout due to injury and was replaced by Superlek Kiatmuu9 for the ONE Flyweight Kickboxing World Championship bout.

Rodtang faced Denis Purić in a Kickboxing bout on June 8, 2024, at ONE 167. At the weigh ins, Rodtang weighed in at 141.25 pounds, 6.25 pounds over the flyweight limit. The bout proceeded at catchweight and he was fined 25 percent of his purse which went to Purić. He won the fight via unanimous decision.

==== Weight miss & title loss ====
In the sixth title defense, Rodtang faced Jacob Smith in a rematch on November 9, 2024, at ONE 169. At the weigh-ins, Rodtang weighed in at 135.5 pounds, 0.5 pounds over the limit. As a result, Rodtang was stripped of the title and only Smith was eligible to win it. He won the fight via unanimous decision and the title remains vacant.

==== Takeru fight ====
The match between Rodtang and Takeru Segawa in a kickboxing superfight was rescheduled on March 23, 2025, at ONE 172. He won the fight via knockout in round one and this win earned the $50,000 Performance of the Night bonuses.

== Football career ==
Rodtang Jitmuangnon
Personal information
- Height: 1.64 m (5 ft 5 in)
- Position: Midfielder

Team information
- Current team: Phichit United
- Number: 23

Senior career*
Years	Team	Apps	(Gls)
2025–present	Phichit United	0	(0)
- * Club domestic league appearances and goals

=== Phichit United ===
On July 17, 2025, it was announced that Rodtang had signed a two-year contract to play professional football with Phichit United F.C., a club that had recently been promoted to the Thai League 3.

== Personal life ==
Rodtang previously dated former ONE Atomweight Muay Thai World Champion and Atomweight Kickboxing World Champion Stamp Fairtex. In February 2023, he married fellow fighter Aida Looksaikongdin. Rodtang was briefly ordained as a Buddhist monk a month earlier, but shortly after the wedding announced he had converted to Islam, the same religion as Aida.

Rodtang received an Honorary Master of Education in Physical Education and Sports Management from Thaksin University on June 7, 2025.

== Titles and accomplishments ==
- ONE Championship
  - ONE Flyweight Muay Thai World Championship
    - Five successful title defenses
  - Performance of the Night (2 times; vs. Jacob Smith and Edgar Tabares
  - ONE Super Series Fight of the Year 2021 (vs. Danial Williams)
  - Most decision wins in ONE Championship (12)
  - Longest winning streak in ONE Championship (14)
- Rajadamnern Stadium
  - 2019 Rajadamnern Stadium Fight of the Year vs Saeksan Or. Kwanmuang
  - 2018 Rajadamnern Stadium Fight of the Year vs. Chorfah Tor.Sangtiennoi
- Omnoi Stadium
  - 2017 Omnoi Stadium Super Featherweight (130 lbs) Champion (2 defenses)
- MAX Muay Thai
  - 2016 MAX Muay Thai 125 lb Champion (1 defense)

== Fight record ==
Professional Muay Thai and Kickboxing record
274 Wins, 45 Losses, 10 Draws
Date	Result	Opponent	Event	Location	Method	Round	Time
2026-11-13	Loss	(Thailand) Nong-O Hama	ONE The Inner Circle 38	Bangkok, Thailand	Decision (unanimous)	3	3:00
2026 ONE Flyweight Muay Thai World Grand Prix Quarterfinal.
2026-04-29	Loss	(Japan) Takeru Segawa	ONE Samurai 1	Tokyo, Japan	TKO (punches)	5	2:22
For the interim ONE Flyweight Kickboxing World Championship.
2025-03-23	Win	(Japan) Takeru Segawa	ONE 172	Saitama, Japan	KO (left hook)	1	1:20
2024-11-08	Win	(England) Jacob Smith	ONE 169	Bangkok, Thailand	Decision (Unanimous)	5	3:00
Rodtang missed weight (135.5 lb) and was stripped of the ONE Flyweight Muay Thai World Championship. Only Smith was eligible to win title.
2024-06-08	Win	(Bosnia and Herzegovina) Denis Purić	ONE 167	Bangkok, Thailand	Decision (Unanimous)	3	3:00
2023-09-22	Loss	(Thailand) Superlek Kiatmuu9	ONE Friday Fights 34	Bangkok, Thailand	Decision (Unanimous)	3	3:00
2023-05-05	Win	(Mexico) Edgar Tabares	ONE Fight Night 10	Broomfield, United States	KO (elbow)	2	1:34
Defends the ONE Flyweight Muay Thai World Championship.
2023-01-14	Win	(China) Jiduo Yibu	ONE Fight Night 6	Bangkok, Thailand	Decision (unanimous)	3	3:00
2022-11-19	Win	(Italy) Joseph Lasiri	ONE on Prime Video 4	Kallang, Singapore	Decision (unanimous)	5	3:00
Defends the ONE Flyweight Muay Thai World Championship.
2022-05-20	Win	(England) Jacob Smith	ONE 157	Kallang, Singapore	Decision (unanimous)	3	3:00
2022 ONE Flyweight Muay Thai World Grand Prix Quarterfinal.
2021-04-07	Win	(Australia) Danial Williams	ONE on TNT 1	Kallang, Singapore	Decision (unanimous)	3	3:00
2021-02-26	Win	(Russia) Tagir Khalilov	ONE Championship: Fists Of Fury	Kallang, Singapore	Decision (Split)	3	3:00
2020-11-14	Win	(Thailand) Yodkhuntap SorGor.SuNgaiGym	Jitmuangnon + Sor.CafeMuayThai, OrTorGor.3 Stadium	Nonthaburi Province, Thailand	Decision	5	3:00
2020-10-05	Win	(Thailand) Kaonar P.K.SaenchaiMuaythaiGym	R1 UFA, World Siam Stadium	Bangkok, Thailand	Decision (Unanimous)	5	3:00
2020-07-31	Win	(Thailand) Petchdam PetchyindeeAcademy	ONE Championship: No Surrender	Bangkok, Thailand	Decision (Majority)	5	3:00
Defends the ONE Flyweight Muay Thai World Championship.
2020-02-27	Loss	(Thailand) Kaonar P.K. Saenchai Muaythaigym	Rajadamnern Stadium	Bangkok, Thailand	Decision	5	3:00
2020-01-31	Win	(Thailand) Yodlekpet Or. Pitisak	Phuket Super Fight Real Muay Thai	Mueang Phuket District, Thailand	Decision	5	3:00
2020-01-10	Win	(England) Jonathan Haggerty	ONE Championship: A New Tomorrow	Bangkok, Thailand	TKO (3 Knockdown Rule)	3	2:39
Defends the ONE Flyweight Muay Thai World Championship.
2019-10-13	Win	(Brazil) Walter Goncalves	ONE Championship: Century	Tokyo, Japan	Decision (Split)	5	3:00
Defends the ONE Flyweight Muay Thai World Championship.
2019-09-12	Win	(Thailand) Saeksan Or. Kwanmuang	Rajadamnern Stadium	Bangkok, Thailand	Decision (Unanimous)	5	3:00
2019-08-16	Win	(Thailand) Saeksan Or. Kwanmuang	Supit + Sor. Sommai Birthday Fights	Songkhla, Thailand	Decision	5	3:00
2019-08-02	Win	(England) Jonathan Haggerty	ONE Championship: Dawn Of Heroes	Manila, Philippines	Decision (Unanimous)	5	3:00
Wins the ONE Flyweight Muay Thai World Championship.
2019-05-10	Win	(Cambodia) Sok Thy	ONE Championship: Warriors Of Light	Bangkok, Thailand	TKO (Low kicks)	2	1:06
2019-03-31	Win	(France) Hakim Hamech	ONE Championship: A New Era	Tokyo, Japan	Decision (Split)	3	3:00
2019-03-07	Win	(Thailand) Chorfah Tor.Sangtiennoi	Rajadamnern Stadium	Bangkok, Thailand	Decision	5	3:00
2019-01-25	Win	(Tunisia) Fahdi Khaled	ONE Championship: Hero's Ascent	Manila, Philippines	Decision (Unanimous)	3	3:00
2018-11-17	Win	(Japan) Yuki	RISE 129	Tokyo, Japan	Decision (Unanimous)	3	3:00
2018-10-25	Loss	(Thailand) Rungkit Morbeskamala	Rajadamnern Stadium	Bangkok, Thailand	Decision	5	3:00
For the vacant Rajadamnern Stadium Super Featherweight (130 lbs) title.
2018-09-22	Win	(Suriname) Sergio Wielzen	ONE Championship: Conquest of Heroes	Jakarta, Indonesia	Decision (Unanimous)	3	3:00
2018-08-30	Win	(Thailand) Chorfah Tor.Sangtiennoi	Rajadamnern Stadium	Bangkok, Thailand	Decision	5	3:00
2018-08-07	Win	(Thailand) Superbank Mor Ratanabandit	Wandetchit + Birthday Supit + Muaydee VitheeThai Super Fight	Songkhla, Thailand	Decision	5	3:00
2018-07-12	Win	(Thailand) Mongkonkeaw Sor.Sommai	Rajadamnern Stadium	Bangkok, Thailand	KO (Left hook)	4	
2018-06-16	Loss	(Japan) Tenshin Nasukawa	RISE 125	Tokyo, Japan	Ext.R Decision (Unanimous)	6	3:00
For the inaugural RISE Featherweight (126 lbs) World title.
2018-05-23	Win	(Thailand) Rodlek Jaotalaytong	Rajadamnern Stadium	Bangkok, Thailand	Decision	5	3:00
2018-04-28	Win	(Thailand) Phetnamngam Aor.Kwanmuang	Siam Omnoi Stadium	Samut Sakhon, Thailand	Decision	5	3:00
Defends the Omnoi Stadium Super Featherweight (130 lbs) title.
2018-03-28	Win	(Thailand) Suakim PK Saenchaimuaythaigym	WanParunchai + Poonseua Sanjorn	Nakhon Si Thammarat, Thailand	Decision	5	3:00
2018-02-08	Win	(Thailand) Petchdam PetchyindeeAcademy	Rajadamnern Stadium	Bangkok, Thailand	Decision	5	3:00
2018-01-17	Win	(Thailand) Phetnamngam Aor.Kwanmuang	Big One Super Fight promotion	Yala, Thailand	Decision	5	3:00
2017-12-21	Win	(Thailand) Mongkonkeaw Sor.Sommai	Rajadamnern Stadium	Bangkok, Thailand	Decision	5	3:00
2017-11-28	Win	(Thailand) Pakkalek Tor.Laksong	Lumpinee Stadium	Bangkok, Thailand	Decision	5	3:00
2017-11-03	Win	(Thailand) PhetMorakot Sor.Sommai	Lumpinee Stadium	Bangkok, Thailand	Decision	5	3:00
2017-09-30	Draw	(South Africa) Ncedo Gomba	Top King World Series 29	Bangkok, Thailand	Decision	3	3:00
2017-09-09	Win	(Thailand) Mongkonkeaw Sor.Sommai	Samui Fight promotion	Ko Samui, Thailand	Decision	5	3:00
Defends the Omnoi Stadium Super Featherweight (130 lbs) title.
2017-08-18	Win	(Thailand) Sakchainoi M.U.Den		Surat Thani Thailand	KO (Punches)	3	
2017-07-29	Win	(Thailand) Chai Sor.Jor.Toypadriew	Omnoi Stadium	Samut Sakhon, Thailand	Decision	5	3:00
Wins the vacant Omnoi Stadium Super Featherweight (130 lbs) title.
2017-07-09	Win	(China) Yang Ming	Topking World Series - EM Legend 21	China	KO (Body punches)	2	
2017-06-11	Loss	(Thailand) Kom Awute F.A.Group	Omnoi Stadium	Samut Sakhon, Thailand	Decision	5	3:00
2017-05-27	Win	(Japan) Keisuke Niwa	Topking World Series	China	Decision	3	3:00
2017-05-04	Loss	(Thailand) Petchdam PetchyindeeAcademy	Rajadamnern Stadium	Bangkok, Thailand	Decision	5	3:00
2017-04-06	Loss	(Thailand) Kaimukkao Por.Thairongruangkamai	Rajadamnern Stadium	Bangkok, Thailand	Decision	5	3:00
2017-02-26	Win	(Thailand) Sibsaen Tor.Iewjaroentongpuket	Channel 7 Boxing Stadium	Bangkok, Thailand	Decision	5	3:00
2017-01-28	Win	(Thailand) Mongkonkeaw Sor.Sommai	Nontaburi Stadium	Bangkok, Thailand	Decision	5	3:00
2016-12-17	Win	(Thailand) Densiam Sor Phansuan	Siam Omnoi Stadium	Samut Sakhon, Thailand	TKO (Right Hook)		
2016-10-02	Win	(Thailand) Chartchay Siapanont	Nontaburi Stadium	Bangkok, Thailand	Decision	5	3:00
2016-09-08	Loss	(Thailand) Audnoi Kaokraigym		Thailand	Decision	5	3:00
2016-08-02	Win	(Thailand) Chailek Khwaithonggym		Thailand	TKO (Referee Stoppage/Punches)		
2016-07-31	Win	(Thailand) Singtong Sor.Yingjaroenkanchang	Nontaburi Stadium	Thailand	Decision	5	3:00
2016-04-21	Win	(Thailand) Tanoonsueklek Aor.Kwanmuang		Thailand	KO	3	
2016-02-03	Win	(Thailand) Petchprakan Kor. Klanbut	MAX Muay Thai Stadium	Pattaya, Thailand	Decision	5	3:00
Defends the MAX Muay Thai 125 lb title.
2016-01-02	Win	(Thailand) Petchprakan Kor. Klanbut	MAX Muay Thai Stadium	Pattaya, Thailand	Decision	5	3:00
Wins the vacant MAX Muay Thai 125 lb title.
2016-01-02	Win	(Thailand) Nuathoranee Samchaivisetsuk	MAX Muay Thai Stadium	Pattaya, Thailand	KO (Punches)	2	
2015-09-06	Win	(Thailand) Chaichan Sitkaowpraphon	Rajadamnern Stadium	Bangkok, Thailand	Decision	5	3:00
2015-01-18	Loss	(Thailand) Yodphet Paengkongprab	Channel 7 Boxing Stadium	Thailand	Decision	5	3:00
2014-11-30	Win	(Thailand) Koh Samui Jaotalaytong	Rajadamnern Stadium	Bangkok, Thailand	Decision	5	3:00
2013-10-20	Loss	(Thailand) Sangtien Sor.Sornsing	Channel 7 Boxing Stadium	Bangkok, Thailand	KO (Left Elbow)	4	
2013-08-28	Win	(Thailand) Thanutong Sor Chokkitchai	Rajadamnern Stadium	Bangkok, Thailand	Decision	5	3:00
2013-07-19	Win	(Thailand) Chalamkao Sitsorot	Lumpinee Stadium	Bangkok, Thailand	Decision	5	3:00
2013-05-02	Win	(Thailand) Puenkon Tor.Surat	SMMTV Thailand Super Fight, Thepprasit Stadium	Pattaya, Thailand	Decision	5	3:00
Legend: Win Loss Draw/No contest Notes

== Special rules record ==
Professional record breakdown
1 match	0 wins	1 loss
By submission	0	1

Res.	Record	Opponent	Method	Event	Date	Round	Time	Location	Notes
Loss	0–1	Demetrious Johnson	Technical Submission (rear-naked choke)	ONE: X	March 26, 2022	2	2:13	Kallang, Singapore	Three-minute rounds alternating between Muay Thai and MMA rules.
