= Danial Williams =

Muay Thai kickboxer

- Born: June 13, 1993 (age 33); Phan, Chiang Rai, Thailand
- Native name: แดเนียล วิลเลียมส์
- Nickname: Mini T
- Nationality: Australian
- Height: 5 ft 6 in (1.68 m)
- Weight: 125 lb (57 kg)
- Division: Strawweight; Flyweight
- Style: Muay Thai, Kickboxing, Mixed martial arts
- Fighting out of: Perth, Australia
- Team: Kao Sok Muay Thai; Scrappy MMA

Kickboxing record
- Total: 35
- Wins: 24
- Losses: 11

Mixed martial arts record
- Total: 10
- Wins: 7
- By knockout: 5
- By decision: 2
- Losses: 3
- By knockout: 1
- By decision: 2

Other information
- Mixed martial arts record from Sherdog

Danial Williams (Thai: แดเนียล วิลเลียมส์, born June 13, 1993), is a Thai-born Australian professional Muay Thai fighter, kickboxer, and mixed martial artist. He competed in the Strawweight division of ONE Championship.

== Background ==
Williams was born on June 13, 1993, in Phan district, Chiang Rai province, Thailand to an Australian father and Thai mother. He came to Australia when he was eight months old.

Williams was a shy child whose mixed heritage always made him feel like a bit of an outcast. He wasn't like his school friends in Australia, or like his family in Thailand, and he struggled to find his place.

== Muay Thai & Kickboxing career ==
=== Early career ===
Williams faced Aaron Leigh for the CMT Super Bantamweight Championship at Caged Muay Thai 3 on July 6, 2013. He won the fight by a fourth-round knockout.

Williams faced Shota Takiya in the 2015 K-1 World GP 2015 Super Bantamweight Tournament quarterfinals, held on April 19, 2015. He lost the fight by majority decision.

=== ONE Championship ===
Williams made his ONE Super Series debut against ONE Flyweight Champion Rodtang Jitmuangnon in a non-title fight at ONE on TNT 1 on April 7, 2021. Williams lost the back-and-forth bout by unanimous decision. The fight was later named ONE Super Series Fight of the Year by ONE Championship.

Williams was scheduled to face Rui Botelho on March 25, 2023, at ONE Fight Night 8. However, Williams replacing Rodtang Jitmuangnon faced Superlek Kiatmuu9 for the ONE Flyweight Kickboxing World Championship. He lost the bout via knockout in the third round.

Williams faced Jonathan Di Bella for the ONE Strawweight Kickboxing World Championship on October 7, 2023, at ONE Fight Night 15. He lost the bout via unanimous decision.

Williams faced Thongpoon P.K.Saenchai on December 7, 2024, at ONE Fight Night 26. He lost the fight via technical knockout in round two.

== Mixed martial arts career ==
=== ONE Championship ===
Williams faced the former ONE Strawweight World champion Dejdamrong Sor Amnuaysirichoke at ONE: Bad Blood on February 12, 2022. He won the fight by a second-round knockout.

Williams faced Namiki Kawahara at ONE 156 on April 22, 2022. He won the fight by unanimous decision.

Williams faced Zelang Zhaxi at ONE 159 on July 22, 2022. He won the fight by a first-round knockout. This win earned him the Performance of the Night award.

Williams faced Jeremy Miado on October 22, 2022, at ONE on Prime Video 3. At weigh-ins, Jeremy Miado came in at 127 lbs, 2 pounds over the limit. The bout continued at a catchweight and Miado paid a fine to Williams. Williams lost by third-round technical knockout.

Returning to MMA, Williams faced Lito Adiwang on February 17, 2024 at ONE Fight Night 19, losing the fight via unanimous decision.

Williams faced Banma Duoji on October 5, 2024, at ONE Fight Night 25. At the weigh-ins, Banma weighed in at 136.25 pounds, 1.25 pounds over the flyweight limit. The bout proceeded at catchweight and Banna was fined 35% of his purse which went to Williams. He won the fight via unanimous decision.

== Titles and accomplishments ==
- ONE Championship
  - 2021 ONE Super Series Fight of the Year vs. Rodtang Jitmuangnon
  - Performance of the Night (One time) vs. Zelang Zhaxi
  - 2024: Ranked #4 Fight of the Year vs. Lito Adiwang
- Caged Muay Thai
  - CMT Super Bantamweight Championship (Two times)
- World Muaythai Council
  - 2015 WMC Featherweight World Champion
- World Kickboxing Federation
  - 2013 WKBF World Flyweight Champion
- International Federation of Muaythai Associations
  - 2015 Muaythai University World Cup -60 kg (gold)

== Mixed martial arts record ==
Professional record breakdown
10 matches	7 wins	3 losses
By knockout	5	1
By decision	2	2

Res.	Record	Opponent	Method	Event	Date	Round	Time	Location	Notes
Win	7–3	Banma Duoji	Decision (unanimous)	ONE Fight Night 25	October 5, 2024	3	5:00	Bangkok, Thailand	Return to Bantamweight; Banma missed weight (136.25 lb).
Loss	6–3	Lito Adiwang	Decision (unanimous)	ONE Fight Night 19	February 17, 2024	3	5:00	Bangkok, Thailand	
Loss	6–2	Jeremy Miado	TKO (punches)	ONE on Prime Video 3	October 22, 2022	3	0:31	Kuala Lumpur, Malaysia	Catchweight (127 lb) bout; Miado missed weight.
Win	6–1	Zelang Zhaxi	KO (punch)	ONE 159	July 22, 2022	1	4:20	Kallang, Singapore	Performance of the Night.
Win	5–1	Namiki Kawahara	Decision (unanimous)	ONE 156	April 22, 2022	3	5:00	Kallang, Singapore	
Win	4–1	Dejdamrong Sor Amnuaysirichoke	KO (punch to the body)	ONE: Bad Blood	February 12, 2022	2	1:35	Kallang, Singapore	
Win	3–1	Jake Hearl	TKO (punches)	Eternal MMA 51	February 29, 2020	2	3:34	Perth, Australia	
Win	2–1	Chris Wase	TKO (punches)	Eternal MMA 48	October 4, 2019	2	3:43	Melbourne, Australia	Bantamweight bout.
Loss	1–1	Paul Loga	Decision (unanimous)	Eternal MMA 38	October 27, 2018	3	5:00	Findon, Australia	Flyweight debut.
Win	1–0	Mark Familari	TKO (punches)	Eternal MMA 37	September 29, 2018	3	1:21	Perth, Australia	Bantamweight debut.

== Muay Thai and Kickboxing record ==
Professional kickboxing record
24 Wins, 11 Losses, 0 draw
Date	Result	Opponent	Event	Location	Method	Round	Time
2024-12-07	Loss	(Thailand) Thongpoon P.K.Saenchai	ONE Fight Night 26	Bangkok, Thailand	TKO (3 Knockdowns)	2	1:10
2023-10-07	Loss	(Italy) Jonathan Di Bella	ONE Fight Night 15	Bangkok, Thailand	Decision (unanimous)	5	3:00
For the ONE Strawweight Kickboxing World Championship.
2023-03-25	Loss	(Thailand) Superlek Kiatmuu9	ONE Fight Night 8	Kallang, Singapore	KO (Punches)	3	1:55
For the ONE Flyweight Kickboxing World Championship.
2021-04-07	Loss	(Thailand) Rodtang Jitmuangnon	ONE on TNT 1	Kallang, Singapore	Decision (unanimous)	3	3:00
2016-05-13	Win	(Thailand) Super Nong	Road to Rebellion 6	Melbourne, Australia	Decision (unanimous)	5	3:00
2015-09-22	Loss	(France) Charles Bongiovanni	K-1 World GP 2015 Survival Wars	Tokyo, Japan	KO (Punches)	1	2:20
2015-06-06	Win	(Thailand) Saksit Tor.Piamsabpetriew	Domination 15	Perth, Australia	Decision	5	3:00
Wins WMC World 122 lbs title.
2015-04-19	Loss	(Japan) Shota Takiya	K-1 World GP 2015 -55kg Championship Tournament, Quarterfinals	Tokyo, Japan	Decision (majority)	3	3:00
2014-12-06	Win	(England) Andy Howson	Caged Muay Thai 5	Brisbane, Australia	Decision (split)	5	3:00
Retains the CMT Super Bantamweight Championship.
2014-09-20	Win	(Republic of Ireland) Karl Hodgers	Origins 6	Perth, Australia	KO	3	1:48
2013-12-	Win	(Australia)		Australia	KO		
Wins WKBF Muay Thai World Flyweight title.
2013-07-20	Loss	(Japan) Dyki	RISE 94	Tokyo, Japan	Decision (Unanimous)	3	3:00
2013-07-06	Win	(Australia) Aaron Leigh	Caged Muay Thai 3	Brisbane, Australia	KO	4	2:47
Wins the CMT Super Bantamweight Championship.
2013-05-03	Win	(Australia) Liam Mcneill	Road to Rebellion 2	Melbourne, Australia	Decision (Split)	5	3:00
2012-04-14	Win	(Australia) Zac Einersen	Epic 5	Perth, Australia	KO	2	1:58
2012-03-03	Win	(Australia) Ben Brown	Domination 8	Australia	Decision	5	3:00
2011-04-16	Win	(Australia) Jesse Caruna	Domination 6	Australia	KO	4	
Legend: Win Loss Draw/No contest Notes

Amateur Muay Thai record
Date	Result	Opponent	Event	Location	Method	Round	Time
2015-03-23	Win	(Uzbekistan) Ilkomjon Rustamov	2015 IFMA-FISU Muaythai University World Cup, Final	Bangkok, Thailand	Decision	3	3:00
Wins 2015 IFMA-FISU Muaythai University World Cup -60kg Gold Medal.
2015-03-	Win		2015 IFMA-FISU Muaythai University World Cup, Semi Finals	Bangkok, Thailand	Decision	3	3:00
2015-03-	Win	(Thailand)	2015 IFMA-FISU Muaythai University World Cup, Quarter Finals	Bangkok, Thailand	Decision	3	3:00
2014-05-	Loss	(Russia) Aleksandr Abramov	2014 IFMA World Championship, Quarter Finals	Langkawi, Malaysia	Decision	3	3:00
Legend: Win Loss Draw/No contest Notes
