= Sinsamut Klinmee =

Thai Muay Thai Kickboxer (born 1995)

- Born: Boonsom Klinmee; October 30, 1995 (age 30); Pattaya, Thailand
- Other names: The Aqua Man; Sinsamut Sittappaya (สินสมุทร ศิษย์ทัพยา); Sinsamut Minsakawan (สินสมุทร มิสกวัน); Sinsamut Sudsakorn (สินสมุทร สุดสาคร)
- Height: 5 ft 11 1/2 in (182 cm)
- Weight: 170 lb (77 kg; 12 st 2 lb)
- Division: Lightweight
- Reach: 71 in (180 cm)
- Style: Muay Thai
- Team: Venum Training Camp; Sudsakorn Muay Thai Gym
- Trainer: Mehdi Zatout; Tappaya Sit-Or; Sudsakorn Sor Klinmee

Kickboxing record
- Total: 113
- Wins: 90
- Losses: 20
- Draws: 3

Other information
- Notable relatives: Sudsakorn Sor Klinmee (brother); Rambaa Somdet (uncle)

Sinsamut Klinmee (Thai: สินสมุทร กลิ่นมี; born October 30, 1995) is a Thai Muay Thai fighter and Bare knuckle boxer who competes in the lightweight division of ONE Championship.

== Early life ==
Klinmee born in Pattaya, Thailand, his family ran a gym. Along with running the gym, his family was a major force on the Thailand Circuit, producing champions in revered stadiums such as Lumpinee and Rajadamnern. Klinmee start training from the age of 4, but he started to take it more seriously under the tutelage of his father and his brother Sudsakorn Sor Klinmee a few years later. His first fight when he was 7.

At age of 21, Klinmee was drafted into the Thai armed forces. After He won multiple fights, the army sent him to join the national boxing camp. In 2019 after winning a national boxing title at Lumpinee Stadium in Bangkok, Klinmee got the chance to fight at the International Military Sports Council competition.

== Fighting career ==
=== BKFC Thailand ===
Klinmee defeated Jonny Tello in a bare-knuckle boxing match by decision at BKFC Thailand 1 on December 18, 2021.

=== ONE Championship ===
Sinsamut replaced Islam Murtazaev for a short notice fight at ONE: X on March 26, 2022, against former Glory Welterweight Champion Nieky Holzken, initially in kickboxing, the fight was changed to Muay Thai rules. He won the fight by a second-round knockout.

Klinmee was expected to face Islam Murtazaev at ONE 159 on July 22, 2022. Murtazaev later withdrew because of a "family emergency" and was replaced by Liam Nolan. Klinmee won the fight by a five-second knockout in the second round.

Klinmee faced Regian Eersel for the inaugural ONE Lightweight Muay Thai World Championship at ONE on Prime Video 3 on October 22, 2022. He lost the fight by split decision.

The rematch between Sinsamut and Eersel took place on March 17, 2023, at ONE Friday Fights 9. He lost the bout via knockout in the fourth round.

Following his second loss to Eersel, Sinsamut was scheduled to face Victor Teixeira at ONE Friday Fights 24 on July 7, 2023. He won by second-round technical knockout.

Sinsamut was scheduled to face Liam Nolan in a rematch on November 4, 2023, at ONE Fight Night 16. However, Nolan pulled out for undisclosed reason and was replaced by Mouhcine Chafi. At the weigh-ins, Chafi weighed in at 174.5 pounds, four and half pounds over the lightweight fight limit. His bout proceeded at catchweight and he was fined 30% of his purse, which went to Sinsamut. He won the fight via unanimous decision.

Sinsamut faced Dmitry Menshikov on May 4, 2024, at ONE Fight Night 22. He lost the fight via knockout in the third round.

Sinsamut faced Youssef Assouik on October 5, 2024, at ONE Fight Night 25. He lost the fight via unanimous decision.

Sinsamut faced Nauzet Trujillo on January 24, 2025, at ONE 170. He won the fight via first round technical knockout and this win earned the $50,000 Performance of the Night bonus.

== Titles and accomplishments ==
- ONE Championship
  - Performance of the Night (Two times) vs. (Nieky Holzken and Liam Nolan)

== Fight record ==
Professional Muay Thai record
90 wins, 21 losses, 3 draws
Date	Result	Opponent	Event	Location	Method	Round	Time
2026-10-17	Win	(Japan) Shintaro Matsukura	ONE Samurai 4	Tokyo, Japan	KO (high kick)	2	1:17
2026-03-13	Loss	(United Kingdom) George Jarvis	ONE Fight Night 41	Bangkok, Thailand	Decision (Unanimous)	3	3:00
2025-03-14	Loss	(Netherlands) Nieky Holzken	ONE Friday Fights 100	Bangkok, Thailand	KO (Right hook)	1	1:58
2025-01-24	Win	(Spain) Nauzet Trujillo	ONE 170	Bangkok, Thailand	TKO (3 Knockdowns)	1	2:34
2024-10-05	Loss	(Morocco) Youssef Assouik	ONE Fight Night 25	Bangkok, Thailand	Decision (Unanimous)	3	3:00
2024-05-04	Loss	(Russia) Dmitry Menshikov	ONE Fight Night 22	Bangkok, Thailand	KO (Body shots)	3	1:33
2023-11-04	Win	(Spain) Mouhcine Chafi	ONE Fight Night 16	Bangkok, Thailand	Decision (Unanimous)	3	3:00
2023-07-07	Win	(Brazil) Victor Teixeira	ONE Friday Fights 24, Lumpinee Stadium	Bangkok, Thailand	TKO (Doctor stoppage)	2	1:35
2023-03-17	Loss	(Suriname) Regian Eersel	ONE Friday Fights 9, Lumpinee Stadium	Bangkok, Thailand	KO (Left hook to the body)	4	1:17
For the ONE Lightweight Muay Thai World Championship.
2022-10-22	Loss	(Suriname) Regian Eersel	ONE on Prime Video 3	Kuala Lumpur, Malaysia	Decision (Split)	5	3:00
For the inaugural ONE Lightweight Muay Thai World Championship.
2022-07-22	Win	(United Kingdom) Liam Nolan	ONE 159	Kallang, Singapore	KO (Left hook)	2	0:05
2022-03-26	Win	(Netherlands) Nieky Holzken	ONE: X	Kallang, Singapore	KO (Punch)	2	1:39
2021-04-10	Win	(United States) Coleman Maher	Muay Hardcore	Bangkok, Thailand	KO (Left hook)	1	
2019-10-31	Win	(Brazil) Yuri Soares	Muay Hardcore	Bangkok, Thailand	Decision	3	3:00
2019-07-21	Win	(Russia) Islam Murtazaev	Muaythai Night 5	Moscow, Russia	Decision (Split)	5	3:00
2019-04-07	Win	(China) Yang Qiubin	Muay Thai Super Champ	Bangkok, Thailand	KO (Straight to the body)	2	2:10
2018-04-08	Loss	(France) Gaetan Dambo	Duel 3	Paris, France	KO (Knee to the body)	2	
2017-12-08	Win	(Switzerland) Bashkim Selmani	Muay Xtreme	Bangkok, Thailand	Decision	3	3:00
2017-09-07	Win	(Chile) Miguel Araya	Samui Fight	Ko Samui, Thailand	KO (Right cross)	1	
2016-04-30	Loss	(Italy) Anouar Khamlali	Fighting Spirit, Final	Rome, Italy	KO (Elbows)	3	
2016-04-30	Win	(Italy) Martin Meoni	Fighting Spirit, Semi-final	Rome, Italy	Decision	3	3:00
2016-02-28	Win	(Russia) Magomed Zaynukov	SUPER MUAYTHAI	Bangkok, Thailand	KO (High kick)	2	
2016-01-24	Win	(Turkey) Bilada Oguzhan	Max Muay Thai	Pattaya, Thailand	KO (High kick)	1	
2015-11-29	Win	(France) Anes Lakhmari	Max Muay Thai	Pattaya, Thailand	TKO	2	
2015-10-25	Win	(France) Anes Lakhmari	Max Muay Thai	Pattaya, Thailand	Decision	3	3:00
2015-07-26	Win	(Turkey) Umut Norgaz	Max Muay Thai	Pattaya, Thailand	Decision	3	3:00
2015-06-21	Win	(Switzerland) Gligor Stojanov	Max Muay Thai	Pattaya, Thailand	Decision	3	3:00
2015-03-15	Win	(France) James Benal	Max Muay Thai	Pattaya, Thailand	Decision	3	3:00
2014-02-22	Loss	(United Kingdom) Jack Cooper	THAI FIGHT Hua Hin	Hua Hin, Thailand	Decision	3	3:00
2014-01-03	Win	(Thailand) Sudeam Kauanjai	Muay Thai Combat Mania	Pattaya, Thailand	Decision	3	3:00
2013-11-15	Win	(Thailand) Kom Kop Petchrungruang	Muay Thai Combat Mania	Pattaya, Thailand	Decision	3	3:00
Legend: Win Loss Draw/No contest Notes

== Bare knuckle record ==
Professional record breakdown
1 match	1 win	0 losses
By decision	1	0

Res.	Record	Opponent	Method	Event	Date	Round	Time	Location	Notes
Win	1–0	Jonny Tello	Decision	BKFC Thailand 1	December 18, 2021	5	2:00	Pattaya, Thailand	

== See also ==
- List of current ONE fighters
- List of ONE bonus award recipients
- 2022 in ONE Championship
- ONE on Prime Video 3
- ONE 159
- ONE: X
