= ONE 170 =

Combat sport events in 2025

ONE 170: Tawanchai vs. Superbon 2
- The poster for ONE 170: Tawanchai vs. Superbon 2
- Promotion: ONE Championship
- Date: January 24, 2025
- Venue: Impact Arena
- City: Bangkok, Thailand

Event chronology
ONE Friday Fights 94: Puengluang vs. Guluzada	ONE 170: Tawanchai vs. Superbon 2	ONE Friday Fights 95: Yodlekpet vs. Jaosuayai

ONE 170: Tawanchai vs. Superbon 2 was a combat sports event produced by ONE Championship that took place on January 24, 2025, at the Impact Arena in Bangkok, Thailand.

== Background ==
The event marked the promotion's 18th held in Impact Arena and first since ONE 167 in June 2024.

A ONE Featherweight Muay Thai World Championship rematch between current champion Tawanchai P.K.Saenchai and former ONE Featherweight Kickboxing World Champion Superbon Singha Mawynn headlined the event. The pairing previously met at ONE Friday Fights 46, which Tawanchai defended the title by unanimous decision. Before to met, the pairing was previously scheduled to headline at ONE Fight Night 15, but Superbon was forced to pulled out due to a leg injury and the second was scheduled to headline at ONE Fight Night 17, but Tawanchai withdrew from the fight due to being hospitalized with a viral infection.

A ONE Bantamweight Muay Thai World Championship bout between current champion (also a current ONE Flyweight Kickboxing World Champion) Superlek Kiatmuu9 and Nico Carrillo was expected to take place at the event. However, Superlek withdrew due to serious knee injury and was replaced by Nabil Anane for the interim title. Anane was originally scheduled to face Kiamran Nabati at this event. The winner will to face Superlek for the unification title at ONE 172 on March 23.

A ONE Bantamweight World Championship bout between current champion Fabrício Andrade and Kwon Won-il took place at the event. The pairing previously met at ONE 158 in June 2022, which Andrade win by knockout in first round.

This event featured opportunities for ONE Lumpinee athletes, who have not yet signed a contract can completed at this event.

A 142-pounds Muay Thai bout between Saeksan Or. Kwanmuang and Lethwei legend Soe Lin Oo took place at the event. On December 2, it was announced that Soe injuries sustained in a car accident and the fight was initially cancelled. Soe has been medically cleared for competition and the bout stepped back into the original pairing. At the weigh-ins, Soe weighed in at 142.5 pounds, 0.5 pounds over the 142 pounds limit and he was fined 20 percent his purse which went to Saeksan.

Marcelo Garcia made his return to competition in an openweight submission grappling match against Masakazu Imanari on the main card.

A lightweight bout between Maurice Abévi and Samat Mamedov took place at the event. The pair was previously scheduled to meet at ONE 168 in September 2024, but the bout was removed from the event after Mamedov pulled out with a broken arm during the weigh-ins. At the weigh-ins, both fighters missed weight: Abévi weighed in at 174.25 pounds and Mamedov at 176 pounds, 4.25 pounds and 6 pounds over the lightweight limit and the bout was not fined of his purse.

Also at the weigh-ins, Suriyanlek Por.Yenying failed the hydration test and came in at 137.25 pounds, 3.25 pounds over the 134 pounds limit and he was fined 20 percent his purse which went to Thant Zin.

== Results ==
Fight card (YouTube / Watch ONE)
Weight class				Method	Round	Time	Notes
Featherweight Muay Thai	Tawanchai P.K.Saenchai (c)	def.	Superbon Singha Mawynn	TKO (punches)	2	1:10	(Note: For the ONE Featherweight Muay Thai World Championship.)
Bantamweight	Fabrício Andrade (c)	def.	Kwon Won-il	TKO (punch to the body)	1	0:42	(Note: For the ONE Bantamweight World Championship.)
Bantamweight Muay Thai	Nabil Anane	def.	Nico Carrillo	TKO (punches)	1	2:35	(Note: For the interim ONE Bantamweight Muay Thai World Championship.)
Catchweight (142 lbs) Muay Thai	Saeksan Or. Kwanmuang	def.	Soe Lin Oo	Decision (unanimous)	3	3:00	(Note: Soe missed weight (142.5 lb).)
Featherweight Muay Thai	Bampara Kouyate	def.	Jo Nattawut	TKO (punches)	1	2:34
Lightweight Muay Thai	Sinsamut Klinmee	def.	Nauzet Trujillo	TKO (elbow)	1	2:34
Flyweight Muay Thai	Johan Estupiñan	def.	Johan Ghazali	Decision (unanimous)	3	3:00
Lightweight	Maurice Abévi	def.	Samat Mamedov	TKO (submission to strikes)	2	2:46	(Note: Both fighters missed weight: Abévi (174.25 lb) and Mamedov (176 lb).)
Openweight Submission grappling	Marcelo Garcia	def.	Masakazu Imanari	Submission (north-south choke)	1	4:49
Featherweight Kickboxing	Masaaki Noiri	def.	Shakir Al-Tekreeti	KO (leg kick)	2	0:14
Preliminary card (YouTube / Watch ONE)
Catchweight (134 lbs) Muay Thai	Suriyanlek Por.Yenying	def.	Thant Zin	TKO (punch)	2	2:05	(Note: Suriyanlek missed weight (137.25 lb).)
Flyweight Muay Thai	Jhordan Estupiñan	def.	Freddie Haggerty	Decision (unanimous)	3	3:00

== Bonus awards ==
The following fighters received $50,000 bonuses:

- Performance of the Night: Tawanchai P.K.Saenchai, Fabrício Andrade, Nabil Anane and Sinsamut Klinmee

== See also ==
- 2025 in ONE Championship
- List of ONE Championship events
- List of current ONE fighters
- ONE Championship Rankings
