= Banchamek =

Banchamek is a Thai boxing gym. The name may refer to:

- Buakaw Banchamek (born 1982), Muay Thai kickboxer from Thailand
- Superbon Banchamek (born 1990), Muay Thai kickboxer from Thailand
