= Jo Nattawut =

Thai Muay Thai kickboxer

- Born: Nattawut Somkhun; October 7, 1989 (age 37); Nakhon Ratchasima, Thailand
- Native name: ณัฐวุฒิ โสมกูล โจ ณัฐวุฒิ
- Other names: Smokin' Jo
- Height: 178 cm (5 ft 10 in)
- Weight: 70 kg (154 lb; 11 st)
- Division: Featherweight (ONE); Light middleweight Middleweight
- Reach: 72 in (183 cm)
- Style: Muay Thai
- Fighting out of: Atlanta, Georgia, United States
- Team: Warrior Strength Martial Arts; Thai Top Team; United Training Center

Kickboxing record
- Total: 89
- Wins: 72
- Losses: 15
- Draws: 2

Nattawut Somkhun (Thai: ณัฐวุฒิ โสมกูล; born October 7, 1989), also known as Jo Nattawut and Smokin' Jo, is a Thai Muay Thai kickboxer. He is a five-time Lion Fight super welterweight champion and one-time Lion Fight middleweight champion. He currently competes in ONE Championship for ONE Super Series.

== Biography ==
=== Early years ===
Jo Nattawut, born Nattawut Somkhun in Nakhon Ratchasima, Northeastern Isan region of Thailand, grew up playing football at school and spent his weekends working on local rice farms. Jo first discovered Muay Thai at 10 years old, when he saw his football coach hitting a heavy bag. Jo asked to join, starting to train Muay Thai after football practice. He had his first fight at the age of 10 with 12 hours notice. Eventually, he decided to join a Muay Thai camp near his house and continue training in his free time. When he was 18 years old, Jo moved to Bangkok to join a gym and get serious about Muay Thai.

After a year and a half of no success in Muay Thai, Jo gave up Muay Thai and moved to Ko Pha-ngan island. During the day, he worked at a restaurant, hotel, and fitness gym, and at night he sold whiskey on the beach for tourist parties. Jo also organized Muay Thai showcases for tourists and occasionally put himself on the card to fight.

=== Move to the United States and career resurgence ===
Nattawut moved to the United States in early 2013. He first lived in Colorado, where he fell in love with snowboarding. He moved to Atlanta, Georgia in late 2013, where he taught kickboxing and Muay Thai classes.

=== Lion Fight ===
In the United States, Nattawut fought for Lion Fight, an American Muay Thai organization based in Las Vegas. His first fight was with one week's notice, at Lion Fight 17 against Cosmo Alexandre. Nattawut won by split decision. His next fight was arranged with 24 hours notice against Sean Kearney at Lion Fight 19. He won by unanimous decision.

At Lion Fight 22, Nattawut defeated Salah Khalifa to win the Lion Fight Super Welterweight Championship. He successfully defended the super welterweight title five times, beating Charlie Peters at Lion Fight 24, Cedric Manhoef at Lion Fight 28, Hasan Toy at Lion Fight 33, Kengsiam Nor Sripueng at Lion Fight 35, and Petchtanong Banchamek at Lion Fight 37. He also defeated fellow Thai expatriate fighter Malaipet Sasiprapa at Lion Fight 32 to win the Lion Fight Middleweight Championship.

=== ONE Championship ===
After winning multiple Muay Thai titles at the Lion Fight tournaments in the United States, including the Lion Fight Super Welterweight and Lion Fight Middleweight Titles, Nattawut signed a contract with ONE Championship. He made his ONE debut on April 20, 2018 at ONE Championship: Heroes of Honor in Manila, facing legendary kickboxer Giorgio Petrosyan. He lost to Petrosyan by unanimous decision.

His next fight was against Yohann Drai at ONE Championship: Pursuit of Power in Kuala Lumpur on July 13, 2018. Nattawut would knock out Drai in the first round, giving him his first win in ONE Championship. On November 9, 2018, he faced George Mann of Scotland at ONE Championship: Heart of the Lion in Singapore, where he won by unanimous decision.

On February 16, 2019, Jo Nattawut would return to fight in Thailand for the first time since moving to the United States at ONE Championship: Clash of Legends in Bangkok. His opponent at the event was Samy Sana of France, whom he defeated by unanimous decision.

==== 2019 ONE Kickboxing Featherweight World Grand Prix ====
Nattawut was selected to compete in the ONE Super Series Kickboxing Featherweight World Grand Prix, which included Yodsanklai Fairtex, Giorgio Petrosyan, and Dzhabar Askerov. His opponent for the Quarter-Finals was Sasha Moisa, a Ukrainian fighter who also competes in Lethwei in the World Lethwei Championship (itself a partner of ONE Championship). In the Grand Prix Quarter-Finals at ONE Championship: Enter the Dragon in Singapore, he defeated Sasha Moisa via TKO, knocking down the Ukrainian 3 times in the third round, securing a win and advancing to the Grand Prix Semi-Finals.

In the Kickboxing Featherweight Grand Prix Semi-Finals, he was set to face Giorgio Petrosyan a second time at ONE Championship: Dreams of Gold in Bangkok. However, in his rematch with Petrosyan, Nattawut lost by knockout in the first round, getting eliminated from the Kickboxing Featherweight World Grand Prix.

Nattawut currently trains at his own gym, United Training Center, located in Atlanta, Georgia.

==== 2021 ONE Kickboxing Featherweight World Grand Prix ====
After two years away, Nattawut was scheduled to make his return against Yurik Davtyan in an alternate bout for the 2021 ONE Kickboxing Featherweight Grand Prix at ONE Championship: First Strike on October 15, 2021. However, the fight was removed from the card for undisclosed reasons. Nattawut's fight with Davtyan was eventually rescheduled for ONE Championship: NextGen II on November 12, 2021. Nattawut won by knockout in the first round.

He was originally set to face fellow Grand Prix alternate Dovydas Rimkus at ONE: Only the Brave on January 28, 2022. However, after Grand Prix semifinalist Marat Grigorian tested positive for COVID-19, Nattawut was rebooked to face Chingiz Allazov in the Grand Prix semifinals. Nattawut lost by first-round knockout.

==== Post Grand Prix ====
Nattawut faced Jamal Yusupov under Muay Thai rules at ONE 159 on July 22, 2022. He lost by unanimous decision.

Nattawut faced Tawanchai P.K.Saenchai, replacing Superbon Singha Mawynn on October 7, 2023, at ONE Fight Night 15. He lost the fight via unanimous decision.

Nattawut was scheduled to face Niclas Larsen on December 9, 2023, at ONE Fight Night 17. However, Larsen withdrew from the bout due to injury and was replaced by promotional newcomer Luke Lessei. He won the fight via unanimous decision.

Nattawut faced Tawanchai P.K.Saenchai in a rematch, for the ONE Featherweight Muay Thai World Championship on June 7, 2024, at ONE 167. He lost the fight via majority decision.

Nattawut faced Superbon Singha Mawynn on September 27, 2024, at ONE Friday Fights 81. He lost the fight by a first-round knockout.

The trilogy bout between Nattawut and Tawanchai was scheduled on November 8, 2024, at ONE 169. However, the bout was removed from the event due to Nattawut injury after losing via knockout against Superbon at ONE Friday Fights 81.

Nattawut faced Bampara Kouyate on January 14, 2025, at ONE 170. He lost the fight via first round technical knockout.

== Titles and accomplishments ==
- ONE Championship
  - 2024: Ranked #5 Fight of the Year vs. Tawanchai P.K.Saenchai
- Lion Fight
  - 2016 Lion Fight Middleweight Champion
  - 2015 Lion Fight Super Welterweight Champion
    - Five successful defenses

== Fight record ==
Kickboxing record
72 wins, 15 losses, 2 draws
Date	Result	Opponent	Event	Location	Method	Round	Time
2025-12-19	Loss	(Iran) Mohammad Siasarani	ONE Friday Fights 137, Lumpinee Stadium	Bangkok, Thailand	KO (right cross)	2	1:39
2025-01-24	Loss	(France) Bampara Kouyaté	ONE 170	Bangkok, Thailand	TKO (3 knockdowns)	1	2:36
2024-09-27	Loss	(Thailand) Superbon Singha Mawynn	ONE Friday Fights 81	Bangkok, Thailand	KO (elbow)	1	1:43
2024-06-08	Loss	(Thailand) Tawanchai P.K. Saenchaimuaythaigym	ONE 167	Bangkok, Thailand	Decision (majority)	5	3:00
For the ONE Muay Thai Featherweight Championship
2023-12-09	Win	(United States) Luke Lessei	ONE Fight Night 17	Bangkok, Thailand	Decision (unanimous)	3	3:00
2023-10-07	Loss	(Thailand) Tawanchai P.K. Saenchaimuaythaigym	ONE Fight Night 15	Bangkok, Thailand	Decision (unanimous)	3	3:00
2022-07-22	Loss	(Russia) Jamal Yusupov	ONE 159	Kallang, Singapore	Decision (unanimous)	3	3:00
2022-01-28	Loss	(Belarus) Chingiz Allazov	ONE: Only the Brave	Kallang, Singapore	KO (left hook)	1	1:55
Kickboxing Featherweight Grand Prix Semi-finals
2021-11-12	Win	(Armenia) Yurik Davtyan	ONE Championship: NextGen II	Singapore	KO (right cross)	1	2:50
2019-08-16	Loss	(Italy) Giorgio Petrosyan	ONE Championship: Dreams of Gold	Bangkok, Thailand	KO (left straight)	1	2:44
Kickboxing Featherweight Grand Prix Semi-Finals
2019-05-17	Win	(Ukraine) Sasha Moisa	ONE Championship: Enter the Dragon	Kallang, Singapore	TKO (3 knockdown rule)	3	1:24
Kickboxing Featherweight Grand Prix Quarter-Finals
2019-02-16	Win	(France) Samy Sana	ONE Championship: Clash of Legends	Thailand	Decision (unanimous)	3	3:00
2018-11-09	Win	(Scotland) George Mann	ONE Championship: Heart of the Lion	Kallang, Singapore	Decision (unanimous)	3	3:00
2018-07-13	Win	(France) Yohann Drai	ONE Championship: Pursuit of Power	Kuala Lumpur, Malaysia	KO (punches)	1	2:59
2018-04-20	Loss	(Italy) Giorgio Petrosyan	ONE Championship: Heroes of Honor	Manila, Philippines	Decision	3	3:00
2017-07-28	Win	(Thailand) Petchtanong Banchamek	Lion Fight 37	Ledyard, United States	Decision (unanimous)	5	3:00
Defends the Lion Fight Super Welterweight title.
2017-03-03	Win	(Thailand) Kengsiam Nor Sripueng	Lion Fight 35	Ledyard, United States	KO (knees to the leg)	3	2:40
Defends the Lion Fight Super Welterweight title.
2017-01-13	Win	(China) Yan Zhao	Superstar Fight 7	Hunan, China	Decision	3	3:00
2016-11-18	Win	(Netherlands) Hasan Toy	Lion Fight 33	United States	Decision (unanimous)	5	3:00
Defends the Lion Fight Super Welterweight title.
2016-10-21	Win	(Thailand) Malaipet Sasiprapa	Lion Fight 32	Las Vegas, United States	Decision (unanimous)	5	3:00
Wins the vacant Lion Fight Middleweight title.
2016-07-02	Win	(China) Mo Zhuang	Superstar Fight 4	Shenzhen, China	KO	2	
2016-05-27	Loss	(Suriname) Regian Eersel	Lion Fight 29	United States	KO (right high kick)	5	
2016-02-26	Win	(Netherlands) Cedric Manhoef	Lion Fight 28	United States	Decision	5	3:00
Defends the Lion Fight super welterweight title.
2015-09-25	Win	(England) Charlie Peters	Lion Fight 24	Ledyard, United States	KO (elbows)	3	
Defends the Lion Fight super welterweight title.
2015-05-22	Win	(United Kingdom) Salah Khalifa	Lion Fight 22	United States	Decision	5	3:00
Wins the Lion Fight super welterweight title.
2015-02-20	Win	(United States) Richard Abraham	Lion Fight 20	United States	Decision	5	3:00
2014-11-21	Win	(United States) Sean Kerney	Lion Fight 19	Ledyard, United States	Decision	5	3:00
2014-08-01	Win	(Brazil) Cosmo Alexandre	Lion Fight 17	United States	Decision	5	3:00
2012-03-03	Loss	(Australia) Toby Smith	Domination 8	Australia	Decision	5	3:00
Legend: Win Loss Draw/no contest Notes
