= Keo Rumchong =

Cambodian professional Kun Khmer fighter (born 1988)

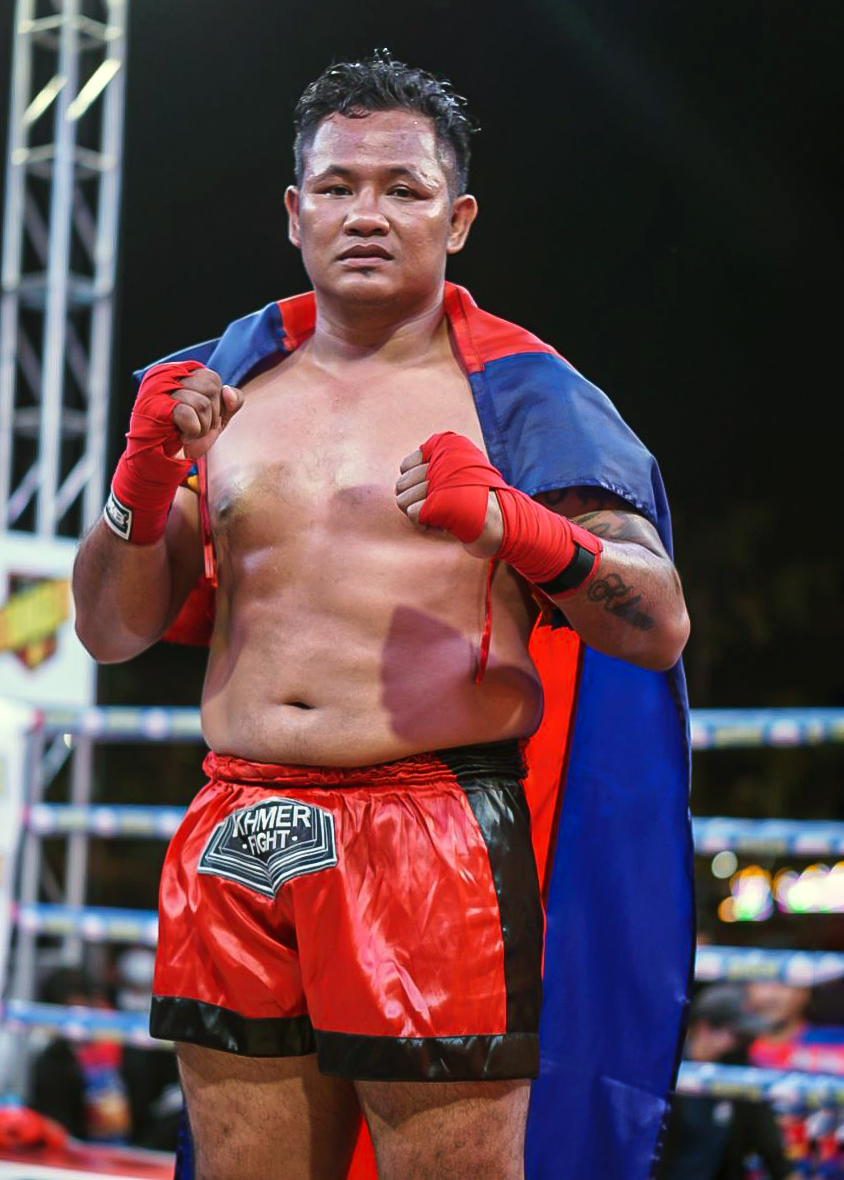
- Born: 7 January 1988 (age 38); Battambang, People's Republic of Kampuchea (now Cambodia)
- Other names: Tiger of Battambang
- Nationality: Cambodian
- Height: 168 cm (5 ft 6 in)
- Weight: 72 kg (159 lb; 11.3 st); 81 kg (179 lb; 12.8 st)
- Style: Kun Khmer
- Team: The Riel Team

Kickboxing record
- Total: 177
- Wins: 160
- By knockout: 68
- Losses: 13
- Draws: 4

Keo Rumchong (Khmer: កែវ រំចង់; born 7 January 1988) is a Cambodian professional Kun Khmer fighter.

== Biography and career ==
Originating from the Battambang Province of Cambodia, Rumchong first began learning Kun Khmer at the age of five. In Cambodia, he became a multiple-time Bayon TV Kun Khmer champion.

Regarded as a legend in his home country, Rumchong has fought overseas on multiple occasions.

In July 2009, he outpointed Vung Noy. He used an overhand right in the second round to score a knockdown against Vung Noy. That helped him earn a decision victory at the CTN boxing arena. They fought again in December 2009 where Keo Rumchong had a close decision victory over Vung Noy at Bayon TV arena.

In 2010, the 22 year old pressure fighter beat Lao Sinath, a two division title holder, in the second round at TV3 boxing arena. On December 12, 2010, Long Sophy defeated Keo Rumchong at the TV3 boxing area to win a light-welterweight four-man tournament.

On October 24, 2015, Keo Rumchong lost in controversial fashion to Iquezang Kor.Rungthanakeat at THAI FIGHT: 1st Round in Ho Chi Minh City, Vietnam. This would be the first of three fights the two would engage in.

After defeating Maung Jor of Myanmar at THAI FIGHT: 2nd Round on November 21, 2015, Rumchong set himself up for a rematch with Iquezang. In their second fight, the Cambodian was able to secure the decision victory at THAI FIGHT Count Down on December 31, 2015.

Keo Rumchong next faced the Ukrainian Sasha Moisa in the 2018 Thai Fight Kard Chuek 70 kg King's Cup Tournament semi-final at THAI FIGHT Saraburi on November 24, 2018. Being the shorter fighter by 14 centimeters, Rumchong was overwhelmed by Moisa's heavy hands and was knocked down three times en route to a second-round technical knockout.

On November 24, 2019, Rumchong faced French Kun Khmer fighter Omar Samb, a student of Albert Veera Chey, for the MTGP Super Welterweight -75 kg Championship at Muay Thai Grand Prix 31 Bataclan in Paris. He lost by fourth-round technical knockout.

In 2023, Keo Rumchong was left off the national team in the 81 kg weight class in favor of Prom Samnang. He wanted to represent Cambodia before he retired.

== Coaching ==
Keo Rumchong is an assistant coach to Cambodian kickboxer, Kan Meng Hong.

== Championships and accomplishments ==
- 2011 Bayon TV Kun Khmer 67 kg Champion
- 2014 Bayon TV Kubota Kun Khmer 70 kg Champion

== Fight record ==
This fight record is a combination of pradal serey, kickboxing and muay thai matches.

Professional kickboxing record
160 Wins (68 (T)KOs), 13 Losses, 4 Draws
| Date | Result | Opponent | Event | Location | Method | Round | Time |
| 2024-05-24 | Loss | (Brazil) Machado Bento | Krud Kun Khmer Championship | Cambodia | TKO | 1 | 0:04 |
| 2023-11-29 | Win | (France) Logan Andoche | TVK Krud Kun Khmer | Phnom Penh, Cambodia | KO | | |
| 2023-03-26 | Win | (Thailand) Chok Chai | TVK Krud Kun Khmer | Phnom Penh, Cambodia | Decision | 5 | 3:00 |
| 2022-12-29 | Win | (Thailand) Phu Sang Yai | TV5 Khmer Fight | Phnom Penh, Cambodia | KO | 2 | |
| 2020-11-29 | Win | (Cambodia) Vung Noy | Bayon TV Carabao Kun Khmer | Phnom Penh, Cambodia | TKO | 4 | |
| 2020-02-21 | Loss | (Thailand) Krongchak | Bayon TV Boxing | Phnom Penh, Cambodia | Decision | 5 | 3:00 |
| 2020-02-02 | Win | (Thailand) Plerngnom | Bayon TV Carabao Kun Khmer | Phnom Penh, Cambodia | Decision | 5 | 3:00 |
| 2019-12-29 | Win | (Japan) Kazuki Yamagiwa | Bigbang 37: The Road to Unification | Tokyo, Japan | Decision | 3 | 3:00 |
| 2019-11-24 | Loss | (France) Omar Samb | Muay Thai Grand Prix 31 | Paris, France | TKO | 4 | |
For the MTGP Super Welterweight -75kg title.
| 2019-07-28 | Win | (Thailand) Iquezang Kor.Rungthanakeat | Ek Phnom Kun Khmer Arena | Battambang, Cambodia | Decision | 5 | 3:00 |
| 2019-05-10 | Win | (Thailand) Jacksiam | Bayon TV Boxing | Phnom Penh, Cambodia | KO | 3 | |
| 2018-11-24 | Loss | (Ukraine) Sasha Moisa | THAI FIGHT Saraburi | Saraburi, Thailand | TKO | 2 | |
| 2018-10-14 | Loss | (Thailand) Dabmorn Pumpanmuang | Bayon TV Carabao Kun Khmer | Phnom Penh, Cambodia | KO | 4 | |
| 2018-08-10 | Win | (Thailand) Takunsingha | Bayon TV Boxing | Phnom Penh, Cambodia | Decision | 5 | 3:00 |
| 2018-09-02 | Win | (Thailand) Chalermdet Sor.Tawanrung | Bayon TV Carabao Kun Khmer | Phnom Penh, Cambodia | Decision | 5 | 3:00 |
| 2018-07-07 | Win | (Thailand) Taksila | Bayon TV Boxing | Phnom Penh, Cambodia | TKO | 3 | |
| 2018-04-18 | Win | (Thailand) Louksue | Bayon TV Carabao Kun Khmer | Phnom Penh, Cambodia | KO | 2 | |
| 2018-02-17 | Win | (Thailand) Takoolsing Thor Jatuthen | Bayon TV Boxing | Phnom Penh, Cambodia | KO | 4 | |
| 2018-01-21 | Win | (Thailand) Petchpirun NK Muaythai | Bayon TV Boxing | Phnom Penh, Cambodia | KO | 2 | |
| 2017-12-22 | Win | (Thailand) Tongta Petchinda | Bayon TV Boxing | Phnom Penh, Cambodia | KO | 3 | |
| 2016-11-27 | Win | (Thailand) Takunsingha | Bayon TV Carabao Kun Khmer | Phnom Penh, Cambodia | KO | 3 | |
| 2016-10-29 | Loss | (France) Morgan Adrar | Best of Siam 9 | Paris, France | Decision | 5 | 3:00 |
| 2016-03-12 | Win | (Cambodia) Bird Kham | Bayon TV Boxing | Phnom Penh, Cambodia | Decision | 5 | 3:00 |
| 2016-02-10 | Draw | (Russia) Arbi Emiev | Apsara TV Kun Khmer | Phnom Penh, Cambodia | Decision | 5 | 3:00 |
| 2015-12-31 | Win | (Thailand) Iquezang Kor.Rungthanakeat | THAI FIGHT Count Down | Bangkok, Thailand | Decision | 3 | 3:00 |
| 2015-11-21 | Win | (Myanmar) Maung Jor | THAI FIGHT 2015: 2nd Round | Nakhon Pathom, Thailand | Decision | 3 | 3:00 |
| 2015-10-24 | Loss | (Thailand) Iquezang Kor.Rungthanakeat | THAI FIGHT 2015: 1st Round | Ho Chi Minh City, Vietnam | Decision | 3 | 3:00 |
| 2015-06-21 | Loss | (Cambodia) Long Sophy | Bayon TV Carabao Kun Khmer | Phnom Penh, Cambodia | TKO | 4 | |
For the Bayon TV Carabao Kun Khmer 70kg title.
| 2014-10-12 | Win | (Cambodia) Moeun Sokhuch | Bayon TV Boxing | Phnom Penh, Cambodia | Decision | 5 | 3:00 |
| 2014-06-15 | Win | (Cambodia) Prom Samnang | Bayon TV Boxing | Phnom Penh, Cambodia | Decision | 5 | 3:00 |
Wins the Bayon TV Kubota Kun Khmer 70kg title.
| 2014-02-22 | Loss | (Thailand) Yodsanklai Fairtex | THAI FIGHT WORLD BATTLE 2014: Klai Kang Won | Hua Hin, Thailand | KO | 2 | |
| 2013-12-06 | Loss | (Cambodia) Vung Noy | Bayon TV Boxing | Phnom Penh, Cambodia | KO | 2 | |
| 2013-11-20 | Win | (Cambodia) Ot Phutong | Bayon TV Boxing | Phnom Penh, Cambodia | KO | 4 | |
| 2013-11-08 | Loss | (Cambodia) Vung Noy | Bayon TV Boxing | Phnom Penh, Cambodia | Decision | 5 | 3:00 |
| 2013-09-27 | Win | (Thailand) Wat Chalek | Cambodia Khmer Fighter | Phnom Penh, Cambodia | Decision | 5 | 3:00 |
| 2013-06-28 | Win | (Italy) Luca Novello | Cambodia Khmer Fighter | Phnom Penh, Cambodia | Decision | 5 | 3:00 |
| 2013-06-07 | Win | (Cambodia) Chan Rothana | Bayon TV Boxing | Phnom Penh, Cambodia | Decision | 5 | 3:00 |
| 2013-04-26 | Win | (Brazil) Adaylton Freitas | Cambodia Khmer Fighter | Phnom Penh, Cambodia | Decision | 5 | 3:00 |
| 2013-03-17 | Draw | (Cambodia) Chey Kosal | Bayon TV Boxing | Phnom Penh, Cambodia | Decision | 5 | 3:00 |
| 2012-12-09 | Win | (Australia) Victor Nagbe | Muaythai Warriors in Cambodia | Phnom Penh, Cambodia | Decision (Unanimous) | 3 | 3:00 |
| 2012-11-23 | Win | (Thailand) Teeraphong | CTN Boxing | Phnom Penh, Cambodia | Decision | 5 | 3:00 |
| 2012-03-03 | Win | (France) Dino Adad | Gala international France vs. Cambodge | Paris, France | TKO | 2 | |
| 2012-01-15 | Win | (Uzbekistan) Anvar Boynazarov | Khmer Fight | Phnom Penh, Cambodia | TKO (Injury) | 1 | |
| 2011-11-24 | Win | (Cambodia) Long Sovandoeun | Bayon TV Boxing | Phnom Penh, Cambodia | Decision | 5 | 3:00 |
Wins the Bayon TV Kun Khmer 67kg title
| 2011-11-04 | Loss | (Cambodia) Long Sovandoeun | Bayon TV Boxing | Phnom Penh, Cambodia | Decision | 5 | 3:00 |
For the Bayon TV Kun Khmer 67kg title
| 2011-10-14 | Loss | (Cambodia) Long Sovandoeun | Bayon TV Boxing | Phnom Penh, Cambodia | Decision | 5 | 3:00 |
| 2011-08-18 | Win | (Cambodia) Chan Rothana | Bayon TV Boxing | Phnom Penh, Cambodia | Decision | 5 | 3:00 |
| 2011-01-09 | Draw | (Cambodia) Long Sophy | Bayon TV Boxing | Phnom Penh, Cambodia | Decision | 5 | 3:00 |
Legend: Win Loss Draw/No contest Notes
