= Łukasz Pławecki =

Polish kickboxer (b. 1987)

Lukasz Plawecki
- Born: January 25, 1987 (age 39); Nowy Sącz, Poland
- Native name: Łukasz Pławecki
- Other names: Boom Boom
- Nationality: Polish
- Height: 1.77 m (5 ft 10 in)
- Weight: 77 kg (170 lb; 12 st 2 lb)
- Division: Welterweight
- Fighting out of: Nowy Sącz
- Team: HALNY Nowy Sącz
- Trainer: Martin Belak
- Years active: 2006–present

Kickboxing record
- Total: 42
- Wins: 25
- By knockout: 9
- Losses: 16
- By knockout: 2
- Draws: 1
- No contests: 0

Other information
- Website: LukaszPlawecki.com
- Last updated on: September 9, 2020

Łukasz Pławecki (born January 25, 1987) is a Polish lightweight kickboxer, fighting out of HALNY Nowy Sącz Gym, Poland. He is World Kickboxing Network World Super Welterweight Champion, and the ISKA World Super Middleweight champion.

Polish professional boxer who started his sports career in 2021.

== Biography and career ==
Łukasz Pławecki started his martial arts training under Andrzej Śliwa in Nowy Sącz. When he moved to Kraków, he joined Tomasz Mamulski gym (Polish National Team trainer). Since 2008 he is running his own club Halny Nowy Sącz Gym where he is main coach. He works with Martin Belak, coach in Slovakia Fire Gym during his preparations for professional fights.

Starting from 2006 he fought 29 times in professional kickboxing matches.

In 2015 he fought for Kunlun Fight for the first time. He lost to Superbon Banchamek during Kunlun Fight 25 event. One year later he participated in Kunlun Fight elimination tournament held on Kunlun Fight 46. He was given extra round in semifinal fight against Nishikawa Tomoyuki and two extra rounds in final fight with Tian Xin. He lost to Tian Xin after split decision.

In 2016 he was also competing for King of Kings. In April he scored draw after extra round against Alexandru Prepeliță and in November he won over Viacheslav Tevenish.

On 3 December 2016, during Simple The Best 13 event in Nowa Sol, Poland he won his first World Championship title after defending Lello Perego in five round fight. The event and title were sanctioned by World Kickboxing Network.

In 2017 he was signed by Glory and will gave his debut at Glory 38: Chicago against Niclas Larsen.

In 2018 he moved up to welterweight. In his first fight in the new weight class, he defeated Wojciech Wierzbicki for the Fight Exclusive Night champion belt.

In 2019, Pławecki won the ISKA World Super Middleweight title, through a decision victory over Rodrigo Mineiro, and successfully defended it with a decision win over Michalis Manoli.

== Titles ==
Professional

- 2017 MFC Champion Title (-70 kg)
- 2017 Celtic Gladiator Champion (-70 kg)
- 2017 International Professional Combat Council K-1 World Champion (-72,5 kg)
- 2016 WKN World Kickboxing Super Welterweight Champion (-72.6 kg)
- 2016 Kunlun Fight World Max Group O Tournament Runner Up
- 2019 ISKA World Super Middleweight Freestyle Kickboxing Champion
  - One successful title defense

Amateur

- 2009
  - Second place on World Cup in Szeged Hungary (silver) -71 kg
- 2006
  - Third place on World Cup in Szeged Hungary (bronze) -71 kg

== Professional kickboxing record ==
Professional kickboxing record
Date	Result	Opponent	Event	Location	Method	Round	Time
2020-9-5	Win	(Cyprus) Michalis Manoli	HFO Solpark	Kleszczów, Poland	Decision (Unanimous)	5	3:00
Defends the ISKA Super Middleweight Title
2019-12-7	Loss	(Germany) Sergej Braun	Mix Fight Championship 27, Tournament Semifinal	Frankfurt, Germany	TKO	3	
2019-5-18	Win	(Brazil) Rodrigo Mineiro	HFO Nowe Rozdanie	Nowy Sącz, Poland	Decision (Unanimous)	5	3:00
For the ISKA Super Middleweight Title
2019-1-12	Loss	(Poland) Dominik Zadora	Fight Exclusive Night 23	Lubin, Poland	TKO (Leg Kicks)	3	
For the FEN 170 lbs World Title
2018-10-27	Win	(Germany) Waldemar Wiebe	HFO 5	Nowy Sącz, Poland	KO	3	3:00
Wins IPCC World Champion Title (-77 kg)
2018-09-22	Win	(Romania) Anghel Cardos	MFC 14	Zielona Góra, Poland	Decision	5	3:00
Wins MFC Champion title (-77 kg)
2018-05-25	Win	(Poland) Wojciech Wierzbicki	FEN 21	Wrocław, Poland	Decision	5	3:00
Wins FEN Champion title (-77 kg)
2017-12-16	Win	(Moldova) Denis Teleshman	MFC	Nowa Sól, Poland	KO	1	0:43
Wins MFC Champion Title (-70 kg)
2017-11-04	Win	(Slovakia) Tomas Drabik	Celtic Gladiator 15	Nowy Sącz, Poland	Decision	5	3:00
Wins Celtic Gladiator Championship Title (-70 kg)
2017-09-23	Win	(The Gambia) Yankuba Juwara	HFO 4	Nowy Sącz, Poland	TKO	3	2:47
Wins International Professional Combat Council Welterweight World Champion Title (-72.5 kg).
2017-07-15	Loss	(China) Feng Xingli	Kunlun Fight 64	Chongqing, China	Decision (Split)	3	3:00
2017-02-24	Loss	(Denmark) Niclas Larsen	Glory 38	Chicago, USA	Decision (Unanimous)	3	3:00
2016-12-03	Win	(Belgium) Lefterio Perego	MFC 11	Nowa Sól, Poland	Decision	5	3:00
Wins WKN World Kickboxing Super Welterweight Title (-72.6 kg).
2016-11-05	Win	(Latvia) Viacheslav Tevins	KOK World GP in Riga	Riga, Latvia	Decision	3	3:00
2016-04-23	Loss	(China) Tian Xin	Kunlun Fight 46	Kunming, China	2nd Ex.R Decision	5	3:00
For The 70 kg World Max 2016 Group O Tournament Title.
2016-04-23	Win	(Japan) Nishikawa Tomoyuki	Kunlun Fight 46	Kunming, China	Ex.R Decision	4	3:00
2016-05-01	Win	(Poland) Łukasz Kaczmarczyk	HFO 2: Kunlun Elimination	Krynica Zdrój, Poland	Decision	3	3:00
2016-05-01	Win	(Czech Republic) Krystof Mares	HFO 2: Kunlun Elimination	Krynica Zdrój, Poland	Decision	3	3:00
2016-04-09	Draw	(Moldova) Alexandru Prepeliță	KOK World GP in Moldova	Chișinău, Moldova	Decision	4	3:00
2016-01-30	Loss	(Italy) Filip Solheid	Thai Boxe Mania 2016	Turin, Italy	Decision	5	3:00
2015-12-05	Loss	(Russia) Vladislav Tuinov	W5 Winners Energy	Vienna, Austria	Decision	3	3:00
2015-08-29	Loss	(Slovakia) Pavol Garaj	Knockout Fight Night	Bratislava, Slovakia	Decision	3	3:00
2015-05-15	Loss	(Thailand) Superbon Banchamek	Kunlun Fight 25	Banska Bystryca, Slovakia	Decision	3	3:00
2015-02-21	Win	(Poland) Kamil Stolarczyk	Battle Of Warriors Extra 2	Poland	Decision	3	3:00
2014-10-25	Win	(Morocco) Boubkari Hicham	Pride of the Royal City	Cracov, Poland	KO	1	
2014-04-05	Win	(Slovakia) Kormanos Miroslav	Battle Of Warriors Extra	Poland	KO	1	
2014-03-08	Win	(Slovakia) Cerven David	Battle Of Warriors Kraków	Poland	KO	1	
2013-04-05	Win	(Poland) Tyszkiewicz Damian	NGDM Nowy Targ	Poland	Decision	3	3:00
2012-06-10	Loss	(Germany) Weimer Dima	K-1 Box Nacht Cottbus	Germany, Cottbus	Decision	3	3:00
2012-07-25	Loss	(Thailand) Theptanee Winai	Ibiza Muay Thai Hiszpania	Ibiza, Spain	Decision	3	3:00
2012-07-25	Win	(Italy) Fonda Luca	Ibiza Muay Thai Hiszpania	Ibiza, Spain	Decision	3	3:00
2012-06-22	Loss	(France) Garcia Jean Philippe	Carcharias Boxing 2012 Perpignan	Perpignan, France	Decision	5	3:00
2010-04-24	Win	(Poland) Jędrzejewski Daniel	Angels Of Fire Płock	Płock, Poland	Decision	3	3:00
2010-03-06	Win	(Poland) Pietrzak Łukasz	Wind Of Damage Nowy Sącz	Nowy Sącz, Poland	KO	2	
2009-12-12	Win	(Germany) Wehrberger Gleb	CHAMPCLASS FIGHT NIGHT	Germany	Decision	3	3:00
2009-11-19	Loss	(Czech Republic) Issoz Petr	Angels Of Fire Płock	Płock, Poland	Decision	3	3:00
2009-02-07	Win	(Turkey) Köylü Cihan	Gorlice Fight Night Gorlice	Gorlice, Poland	KO	2	
2008-03-23	Loss	(Finland) Palanto Jesse	Fight Festival Helsinki	Helsinki, Finland	Decision	5	3:00
2008-01-28	Win	(Latvia) Sidorov Dainis	Wielka Gala Kickboxingu Siedlce	Siedlce, Poland	Decision	3	3:00
2007-08-30	Loss	(Poland) Tomczykowski Michał	Gala Boksu Zawodowego	Ostróda, Poland	Decision	3	3:00
2007-07-07	Win	(Turkey) Erkmen Ozkan	PZKB Event	Poland			
2006-09-30	Loss	(Poland) Emil Martirosjan	PZKB Event	Poland	Decision	3	3:00
Legend: Win Loss Draw/No contest Notes

== Professional boxing record ==
15 fights	11 wins	2 losses
By knockout	6	1
By decision	5	1
Draws	2	

No.	Result	Record	Opponent	Type	Round, time	Date	Location	Notes
15	Win	11–2–2	Marvin Ruf	UD	12	23 May 2026	Hala Sportowa, ul. Nadbrzezna, Nowy Sącz, Poland	Won vacant WBF cruiserwieght title
14	Win	10–2–2	Marcel Bode	UD	6	8 Feb 2026	Národní dům, Ústí nad Labem, Czech Republic	
13	Win	9–2–2	Hamza Wandera	TKO	4 (8), 1:00	19 Sep 2025	Hala MOSIR, Dębica, Poland	
12	Win	8–2–2	Oliver Zając	KO	2 (6), 2:10	5 Nov 2024	Hala MOSIR, Mielec, Poland	
11	Loss	7–2–2	Ihosvany Garcia	KO	2 (8), 0:40	24 May 2024	Hala Podpromie, Rzeszów, Poland	
10	Win	7–1–2	Ladislav Nemeth	UD	6	10 Feb 2024	Hala MOSIR, Dębica, Poland	
9	Loss	6–1–2	Jan Czerklewicz	UD	10	15 Jul 2023	Ampfiteatr nad Jeziorem Czos, Mrągowo, Poland	
8	Win	6–0–2	Emmanuel Feuzeu	TKO	4 (8), 2:59	28 Jan 2023	Hala Sportowa ul. Nadbrzezna, Nowy Sącz, Poland	
7	Win	5–0–2	Mateusz Lis	TKO	7 (8), 2:48	30 Sep 2022	Hala Sportowa BKS Stal, Bielsko-Biała, Poland	
6	Draw	4–0–2	Krzysztof Wojciechowski	MD	8	13 May 2022	Hala MCKiS, Jaworzno, Poland	
5	Win	4–0–1	Denys Checheta	KO	1 (6), 1:50	17 Dec 2021	Hala WOSiR, Wyszków, Poland	
4	Draw	3–0–1	Radoslav Estocin	MD	6	6 Nov 2021	Hala Sportowa ul. Nadbrzezna, Nowy Sącz, Poland	
3	Win	3–0	Yurii Popovych	UD	6	3 Sep 2021	Ice Hall BOSiR, Białystok, Poland	
2	Win	2–0	Vladyslav Tantsiura	UD	4	9 Jul 2021	Hala Widowiskowo-Sportowa, Turek, Poland	
1	Win	1–0	Valentyn Zbrozhek	KO	1 (4), 0:52	5 Jun 2021	Bank Club, Warsaw, Poland	
