= Jamal Yusupov =

Russian Muay Thai kickboxer

- Born: Джамал Салахудинович Юсупов; July 29, 1983 (age 43); Makhachkala, Dagestan ASSR, Russia SFSR, Soviet Union
- Other names: Yeniceri; Kherow
- Nationality: Russian; Turkish
- Height: 1.76 m (5 ft 9 1/2 in)
- Weight: 70 kg (150 lb; 11 st)
- Style: Muay Thai
- Stance: Southpaw
- Fighting out of: Bursa, Turkey
- Team: Hyperion Fighters; Best Style Boxing / GOG Fighting (former)
- Rank: Master of Sport in Muay Thai; Master of Sport in Kickboxing

Kickboxing record
- Total: 64
- Wins: 54
- Losses: 10

Mixed martial arts record
- Total: 1
- Wins: 1
- Losses: 0

Jamal Salakhudinovich Yusupov (Russian: Джамал Салахудинович Юсупов; born July 29, 1983) is a Russian-born Turkish kickboxer and Muay Thai fighter.

As of July 2023 he was the #8 ranked lightweight kickboxer in the world by Combat Press.

== Biography and career ==
=== Early life ===
Yusupov started training in Muay Thai at the age of 21 and turned to competition only a few months later. He became a Master of Sports in Muay Thai in 2005 and a Master of Sports in kickboxing the next year. Yusupov competed in Russia where he became a six time national amateur Muay Thai champion. He began coaching in 2011 and later moved to Beijing, China.

=== ONE Championship ===
On October 23, 2019, Yusupov replaced Sasha Moisa on short notice at ONE Championship: Age Of Dragons for a fight against Yodsanklai Fairtex. In an upset, he won by second-round knockout with punches. This marked Yodsanklai's first knockout loss since 2005.

Yusupov was scheduled to face Samy Sana at ONE Championship: Collision Course 2 on 25 December 2020. He won by unanimous decision after scoring a knock down in the second round.

In 2022 Yusupov relocated to Turkey. He was scheduled to face Jo Nattawut under Muay Thai rules at ONE 159 on July 22, 2022. Yusupov won the fight by unanimous decision after scoring a knockdown.

Yusupov challenged Tawanchai P.K. Saenchaimuaythaigym for the ONE Muay Thai Featherweight Championship on February 25, 2023, at ONE Fight Night 7. He lost via a leg kick knockout just 49 seconds into the bout.

=== RCC Fair Fight ===
Yusupov faced reigning Fair Fight lightweight champion Mamuka Usubyan in a non-title bout at RCC Fair Fight 21 on June 10, 2023. He won the fight by extension round unanimous decision.

== Titles and accomplishments ==
Amateur

- 6x Russia National Muay Thai Champion

== Muay Thai and Kickboxing record ==
Professional Muay Thai & Kickboxing record
55 Wins, 10 Losses
Date	Result	Opponent	Event	Location	Method	Round	Time
2024-11-30	Loss	(China) Luo Chao	Wu Lin Feng 550 - MAX Qualifier Tournament, Semifinals	Tangshan, China	TKO (Low kicks)	3	
2024-07-27	Win	(Russia) Dmitry Kireev	RCC Fair Fight	Yekaterinburg, Russia	KO (Punches)	1	1:24
2024-02-03	Loss	(Russia) Aleksei Ulianov	RCC Fair Fight 26	Yekaterinburg, Russia	Decision (Unanimous)	5	3:00
For the RCC Fair Fight -70kg title.
2023-09-23	Win	(Russia) Saifullah Khambakadov	RCC Intro 28	Yekaterinburg, Russia	Decision (Unanimous)	3	3:00
2023-06-10	Win	(Russia) Mamuka Usubyan	RCC Fair Fight 21	Yekaterinburg, Russia	Ext.R Decision (Unanimous)	4	3:00
2023-02-11	Loss	(Thailand) Tawanchai P.K. Saenchaimuaythaigym	ONE on Prime Video 7	Jakarta, Indonesia	KO (Leg Kick)	1	0:49
For the ONE Muay Thai Featherweight Championship
2022-07-22	Win	(Thailand) Jo Nattawut	ONE 159	Kallang, Singapore	Decision (Unanimous)	3	3:00
2022-03-26	Win	(Uzbekistan) Bobirjon Tagaev	Vendetta 25	Istanbul, Turkey	Decision (Unanimous)	3	3:00
2020-12-25	Win	(France) Samy Sana	ONE Championship: Collision Course 2	Kallang, Singapore	Decision (Unanimous)	3	3:00
2019-11-16	Win	(Thailand) Yodsanklai Fairtex	ONE Championship: Age Of Dragons	Beijing, China	KO (Punches)	2	0:35
2019-10-02	Win	(China) Liao Shiwu	Kunlun Fight 85	Tongliao, China	KO (punch to the body)	1	2:09
2019-08-24	Win	(China) Bo Fufan	Wu Lin Feng 2019: WLF World Cup 2019-2020	Zhengzhou, China	Decision (Unanimous)	3	3:00
2018-06-16	Win	(China) Xu Zhenhuang	Wu Lin Feng 2018: China vs Netherlands & Russia	Shenyang, China	KO (Left body kick)	1	1:02
2018-05-19	Win	(China) Sun Weiqiang	Wu Lin Feng 2018: World Championship Yichun	Yichun, Jiangxi, China	Decision (Unanimous)	3	3:00
2018-03-10	Loss	(Morocco) Marouan Toutouh	Wu Lin Feng 2018: -60kg World Championship Tournament	Jiaozuo, China	Decision	3	3:00
2018-03-03	Loss	(Suriname) Regian Eersel	Wu Lin Feng 2018: World Championship Tianjin	Tianjin, China	Decision (Unanimous)	3	3:00
2017-	Win	(China) Huang Zhenyou	Wu Lin Feng	China	KO (Knee to the body)	1	
2017-	Win	(China) Zheng Zhaoyu	Wu Lin Feng	China	KO		
2016-10-22	Win	(Iran) Said	World Fighters King	China			
2014-12-19	Loss	(Azerbaijan) Alim Nabiev	Tvoy Vykhod	Lyubertsy, Russia	Decision	3	3:00
2013-12-20	Win	(Uzbekistan) Sanjar Yusupov	Night of Muaythai	Moscow, Russia	Decision (Unanimous)	5	3:00
2012-10-20	Loss	(Russia) Alexander Surzhko	Combat Line 15th anniversary	Russia	KO (Left hook)	3	
2011-11-04	Loss	(Russia) Andrey Prepelkin	Fights in Corona	Moscow, Russia	KO (Spinning back fist)	1	
Legend: Win Loss Draw/No contest Notes

== Mixed martial arts record ==
Professional record breakdown
1 match	1 win	0 losses
By knockout	1	0

style="background:#bfd; color:black; vertical-align:middle; text-align:center; " class="table-yes2 skin-invert" |Win

Res.	Record	Opponent	Method	Event	Date	Round	Time	Location	Notes
1–0	Meng Shuai	TKO (punches)	Khan Fight: Inferno	10 May 2026	1	2:38	Bursa, Turkey		

== See also ==
- List of male kickboxers
- List of Muay Thai practitioners
