= Nico Carrillo =

Scottish Muay Thai fighter

- Born: 17 October 1998 (age 28); Scotstoun, Scotland, U.K.
- Other names: King of the North
- Height: 179 cm (5 ft 10 in)
- Division: Welterweight; Super Welterweight
- Style: Muay Thai
- Stance: Orthodox
- Fighting out of: Glasgow, Scotland, U.K.
- Team: Deachkalek Muay Thai Academy
- Trainer: J.P. Gallacher
- Years active: c. 2016-present

Kickboxing record
- Total: 36
- Wins: 31
- Losses: 4
- Draws: 1

Other information
- Website: www.nico-carrillo.com

Nico Carrillo (born 17 October 1998) is a Scottish Muay Thai fighter. He is signed to ONE Championship, where he is the current ONE Featherweight Muay Thai World Champion. Carrilo is the current WMO Welterweight World Champion and ISKA Muay Thai World 65 kg Champion.

He peaked at number 1 in the Muay Thai Combat Press Rankings at Welterweight (147 pounds; -67 kilograms).

== Biography and career ==
=== Early career ===
Carrillo started combat sport training with boxing before discovering Muay Thai at the age of 15 at the Glasgow Thai Boxing Academy.

Carrillo faced Paul Barbour at a Muay Thai Boxing event on 26 March 2016. Carrillo won by unanimous decision.

On 2 December 2017 Carrillo faced Shane Farqharson at Victory Promotions. He won the fight by fourth round knockout with a body shot. Carrillo was unable to compete during the year 2018 due to recurring injuries.

Carrillo was scheduled to face Kenny Hong in Sweden on 31 August 2019 at Lion Fight 59. At this occasion Carrillo would decide to pursue a full time fighting career. Carrillo won by unanimous decision.

On 12 February 2021 Carrillo traveled to Dubai for the UAM event where he defeated Muhammadi Jahongir by unanimous decision.

On 24 July 2021 Carillo faced Mo Abdurahman at Combat Fight Series 5 for the ISKA Muay Thai Intercontinental 65 kg title. Carrillo won the fight by technical knockout in the fourth round.

Carrillo faced Jack Kennedy at the Supershowdown 10th Anniversary event in Bolton, England on 24 October 2021 defeating him by first round knockout.

On 21 December 2021 Carillo faced Dani Molero for the WBC Muay Thai European Welterweight title. He won the fight by third round technical knockout on advice of the ringside doctor due the multiple cuts on his opponent's face.

=== World Champion ===
On 26 March 2022 Carrillo faced Jeremy Monteiro for the vacant ISKA Muay Thai World 65 kg title at the Combat Fight Series 7 event. Carrillo won the fight by unanimous decision to capture the title.

Carrillo faced a Thai champion for the first time when he met Saeksan Or. Kwanmuang 23 April 2022 at Siam Warriors. He won the fight by unanimous decision.

Carrillo became the WMO Super Welterweight world champion when he defeated Alessio Malatesta by unanimous decision for the vacant title on 12 November 2022.

=== ONE Championship ===
On 24 March 2023 Carillo announced that he had signed a contract with the ONE Championship organization, making his debut at ONE Friday Fights 13 on 21 April 2023 against Furkan Karabag, winning the bout via TKO in the third round.

Carrillo faced Muangthai P.K.Saenchai on 23 June 2023, at ONE Friday Fights 22, winning the bout in the second round after knocking him down three times in the round.

Carrillo faced Nong-O Hama on 22 December 2023, at ONE Friday Fights 46, winning the bout via second round knockout.

Carrillo faced Saemapetch Fairtex on 6 July 2024 at ONE Fight Night 23, defeating him via TKO after scoring three knockdowns in the third round.

Carrillo was scheduled to face Superlek Kiatmuu9 for the ONE Bantamweight Muay Thai World Championship on January 24, 2025, at ONE 170. However, Superlek withdrew from the bout due to a serious knee injury and was replaced by Nabil Anane for the interim title. He lost the fight via first round technical knockout.

Carrillo moved up to featherweight against Sitthichai Sitsongpeenong on April 5, 2025, at ONE Fight Night 30. He won the fight via knockout in round two and this win earned the $50,000 Performance of the Night bonuses.

Carrillo faced the former Rajadamnern Stadium Welterweight (147 lbs) champion Shadow Singha Mawynn for the interim ONE Featherweight Muay Thai World Championship at ONE Fight Night 40 on February 13, 2026. He won the fight by unanimous decision.

== Titles and achievements ==
=== Professional ===
- International Combat Organisation
  - 2019 ICO European -65 kg Champion
- International Sport Kickboxing Association
  - 2021 ISKA Muay Thai Intercontinental -65 kg Champion
  - 2022 ISKA Muay Thai World 65 kg Champion
- World Boxing Council Muay Thai
  - 2021 WBC Muay Thai European Welterweight Champion
- World Muaythai Organization
  - 2022 WMO World Super Welterweight (154 lbs) Champion
  - 2023 WMO World Welterweight (147 lbs) Champion
  - 2023 WMO Male Fighter of the Year
- ONE Championship
  - ONE Featherweight Muay Thai World Championship (one time, current)
  - Interim ONE Featherweight Muay Thai World Championship (one time, former)
  - Performance of the Night
    - 4 times (vs.Saemapetch Fairtex, Nong-O Hama, Muangthai P.K. Saenchai and Furkan Karabag)

== Fight record ==
Professional Muay Thai and kickboxing record
31 wins, 4 losses, 1 draw
Date	Result	Opponent	Event	Location	Method	Round	Time
2026-12-18		(Thailand) Nabil Anane	ONE The Inner Circle 43	Bangkok, Thailand			
Defending the ONE Featherweight Muay Thai World Championship.
2026-08-15	Win	(China) Zhou Jiaqiang	ONE Fight Night 46	Bangkok, Thailand	KO (right cross)	2	2:37
2026-02-13	Win	(Thailand) Shadow Singha Mawynn	ONE Fight Night 40	Bangkok, Thailand	Decision (unanimous)	5	3:00
Wins the interim ONE Featherweight Muay Thai World Championship.
2025-11-08	Win	(United States) Luke Lessei	ONE Fight Night 37	Bangkok, Thailand	TKO (punches and knees)	2	2:35
2025-04-05	Win	(Thailand) Sitthichai Sitsongpeenong	ONE Fight Night 30, Lumpinee Stadium	Bangkok, Thailand	KO (left hook to the body)	2	2:20
2025-01-24	Loss	(Thailand) Nabil Anane	ONE 170	Bangkok, Thailand	TKO (3 knockdowns)	1	2:35
For the interim ONE Bantamweight Muay Thai World Championship.
2024-07-05	Win	(Thailand) Saemapetch Fairtex	ONE Fight Night 23	Bangkok, Thailand	TKO (3 knockdowns)	3	2:03
2023-12-22	Win	(Thailand) Nong-O Hama	ONE Friday Fights 46	Bangkok, Thailand	KO (elbow)	2	1:28
2023-06-23	Win	(Thailand) Muangthai P.K. Saenchaimuaythaigym	ONE Friday Fights 22, Lumpinee Stadium	Bangkok, Thailand	TKO (3 knockdowns)	2	1:23
2023-04-21	Win	(Turkey) Furkan Karabag	ONE Friday Fights 13	Bangkok, Thailand	TKO (punches)	3	2:31
2023-03-04	Win	(Italy) Pasquale Amoroso	SuperShowDown	Bolton, England	Decision (unanimous)	5	3:00
Wins the WMO World Welterweight (147 lbs) title.
2022-11-12	Win	(Italy) Alessio Malatesta	SuperShowDown	Bolton, England	Decision (unanimous)	5	3:00
Wins the vacant WMO World Super Welterweight (154 lbs) title.
2022-04-23	Win	(Thailand) Saeksan Or. Kwanmuang	Siam Warriors	Cork City, Ireland	Decision (unanimous)	5	3:00
2022-03-26	Win	(France) Jeremy Monteiro	Combat Fight Series 7	Croydon, England	Decision (unanimous)	5	3:00
Wins the interim ISKA Muay Thai World -65kg title.
2021-12-18	Win	(Spain) Dani Molero	MASDA Fight Night	Liverpool, England	TKO (doctor stoppage)	3	
Wins the WBC Muay Thai European Welterweight title.
2021-10-24	Win	(United Kingdom) Jack Kennedy	Supershowdown	Bolton, England	KO (left hook + right cross)	1	
2021-07-24	Win	(United Kingdom) Mo Abdurahman	Combat Fight Series 5	London, England	TKO (punches + elbows)	4	1:28
Wins the ISKA Muay Thai Intercontinental -65kg title.
2021-02-12	Win	(Uzbekistan) Muhammadi Jahongir	UAM	Dubai, United Arab Emirates	Decision (unanimous)	5	3:00
2019-12-07	Win	(Spain) Gorka Caro	VICTORY 5	Gateshead, England	KO (left hook to the body)	1	2:36
Wins the ICO European -65kg title.
2019-08-31	Win	(Sweden) Kenny Hong	Lion Fight 59	Gothenburg, Sweden	Decision	3	3:00
2019-06-29	Win	(Portugal) Joao Francisco	Blitz 6	England	Decision (unanimous)	3	3:00
2019-04-27	Loss	(Denmark) Mikkel Lund	Mikenta Fight Night	Copenhagen, Denmark	KO (left hook to the body)	2	
2019-03-30	Win	(Spain) Alex Dass Rey	Evo Thai Boxing Series	Glasgow, Scotland	Decision (unanimous)	5	3:00
2017-12-02	Win	(United Kingdom) Shane Farqharson	Victory Promotions	Gateshead, England	KO (left hook to the body)	4	1:40
2017-10-21	Win	(Sweden) Angelo Pizarro	Ultimate Muay Thai 5	United Kingdom	KO (high kick)		
2017-07-01	Loss	(United Kingdom) George Mouzakitis	Blitz 4	United Kingdom	Decision	5	3:00
2017-04-29	Win	(Poland) Patryk Sagan	Power of Scotland 24	Paisley, Renfrewshire, Scotland			
2016-10-08	Win	(United Kingdom) Dylan O’hanlon	Ultimate Muay Thai 3	Paisley, Renfrewshire, Scotland	Decision (unanimous)	5	3:00
2016-06-25	Win	(United Kingdom)	Blitz 3	United Kingdom	KO (low kick)		
2016-03-26	Win	(United Kingdom) Paul Barbour	Muay Thai Boxing	Linwood, Renfrewshire, Scotland	Decision (unanimous)	5	3:00
2015-06-27	Loss	(United Kingdom) Ross Trainer	Clydebank Blitz 2	Clydebank, Scotland	Decision	5	3:00
For the vacant WBC Muaythai Under-18 -57.1 kg title.
2014-11-09	Win	(Scotland) Brandon Bartell		Scotland	Decision (unanimous)	5	3:00
Wins the vacant Scottish Thai Boxing Association (STBA) Cadet title.
Legend: Win Loss Draw/no contest Notes
