= Iquezang Kor.Rungthanakeat =

Thai Muay Thai and Lethwei fighter (born 1989)

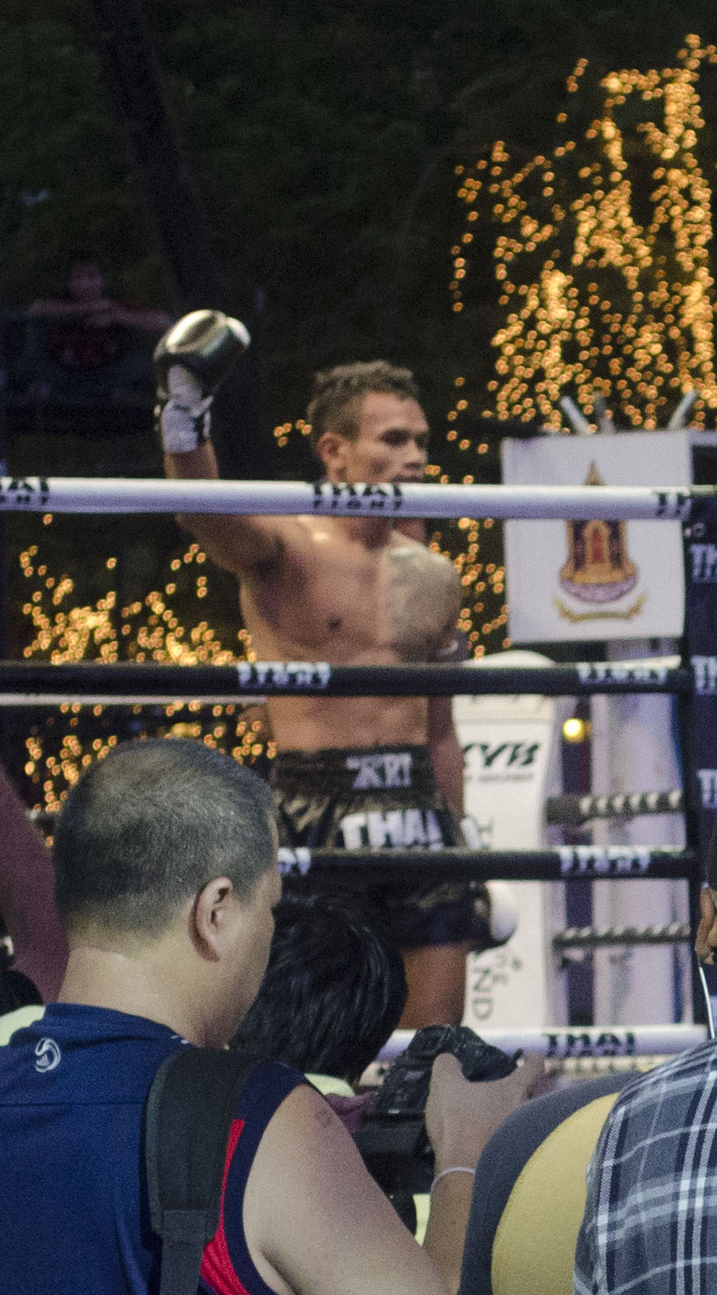
- Born: October 6, 1989 (age 37); Sikhoraphum, Surin, Thailand
- Nationality: Thai
- Height: 173 cm (5 ft 8 in)
- Weight: 70.0 kg (154.3 lb; 11.02 st)
- Division: Welterweight; Super Welterweight
- Style: Muay Thai
- Stance: Orthodox
- Fighting out of: Bangkok, Thailand

Kickboxing record
- Total: 204
- Wins: 176
- Losses: 23
- Draws: 5

Iquezang Kor.Rungthanakeat (Thai: อิกคิวซัง ก.รุ่งธนเกียรติ; born October 6, 1989) is a Thai professional Muay Thai and Lethwei fighter. He is best known for defeating Sitthichai Sitsongpeenong by TKO to win the Omnoi Stadium Welterweight title (147 lbs) and Fuktien Group Tournament title (147 lbs).

== Lethwei ==
In 2017, Iquezang began competing in Lethwei circuit in Myanmar. On 5 August 2018, he was invited to face Burmese fighter Soe Lin Oo under traditional rules at Thein Pyu Stadium in Yangon. Soe Lin Oo delivered a flurry of punches that knocked Iquezang out at two minutes and 22 seconds into the third round.

== Titles and accomplishments ==
Muay Thai

- Omoi Stadium
  - 2011 Omnoi Stadium Welterweight title (147 lbs)
- Fuktien Group
  - 2011 Fuktien Group Tournament title (147 lbs)
- Thai Fight
  - Member of Thai Fight team since 2012 (26–7 record)

== Fight record ==
Kickboxing record
176 Wins , 23 Losses , 5 Draw
Date	Result	Opponent	Event	Location	Method	Round	Time
2021-04-25	Loss	(Portugal) Fabio Reis	THAI FIGHT DMHTT	Samut Sakhon, Thailand	Decision	3	3:00
2021-04-03	Win	(Russia) Vladimir Shuliak	THAI FIGHT Nan	Nan, Thailand	Decision	3	3:00
2020-11-28	Win	(Netherlands) Parmit Grover	THAI FIGHT Pluak Daeng	Rayong, Thailand	KO (Right Hook)	1	
2020-11-07	Win	(Belgium) Omar Mahir	THAI FIGHT Korat 2020	Nakhon Ratchasima, Thailand	TKO (3 Knockdowns)	2	
2020-10-17	Win	(United States) Gladstone Martin-Allen	THAI FIGHT Begins	Nonthaburi, Thailand	KO (Right Hook)	2	
2020-02-01	Loss	(Estonia) Andi Uustalu	KMC Fight 2020	Kota Bharu, Malaysia	KO	1	
2019-10-19	Loss	(Cambodia) Roeung Sophorn	Ek Phnom Kun Khmer Arena	Battambang, Cambodia	DQ (Low blow)	2	
2019-07-28	Loss	(Cambodia) Keo Rumchong	Ek Phnom Kun Khmer Arena	Battambang, Cambodia	Decision	3	3:00
2018-10-29	Loss	(France) Abdelnour Ali-Kada	Yokkao 33 & 34	Kowloon, Hong Kong	Decision	3	3:00
2018-01-06	Loss	(China) Tie Yinghua	Glory of Heroes: Chengdu	Chengdu, China	TKO (Knee)	1	
2017-09-07	Loss	(Iran) Amir Hossein Yousefi	Samui Fight	Koh Samui, Thailand	Decision	3	3:00
2017-04-08	Loss	(France) Yohann Drai	THAI FIGHT Paris	Paris, France	TKO (Left Kick to the Body)	3	
2017-03-04	Loss	(China) Xie Lei	Wu Lin Feng 2017: Kung Fu VS Muay Thai	Zhengzhou, China	Decision	3	3:00
2016-12-24	Win	(Myanmar) Ye Ta Gon	THAI FIGHT The Fighter King	Bangkok, Thailand	KO (Right Hook)	1	
2016-09-11	Loss	(United Kingdom) Salah Khalifa	THAI FIGHT London	London, United Kingdom	Decision	3	3:00
2016-08-20	Win	(France) Georges Remy Salomon	THAI FIGHT KMITL	Bangkok, Thailand	Decision (Unanimous)	3	3:00
2016-07-23	Win	(Russia) Nurgazy Kamilov	THAI FIGHT Proud to Be Thai 2016	Thailand	KO (Right Head Kick)	1	
2016-06-05	Loss	(Russia) Magomedov	EM Legend 9	Chengdu, China	TKO	1	
2016-03-12	Win	(France) Arthur Dutourne	THAI FIGHT	Bangkok, Thailand	Decision (Unanimous)	3	3:00
2015-12-31	Loss	(Cambodia) Keo Rumchong	THAI FIGHT Count Down	Bangkok, Thailand	Decision (Unanimous)	3	3:00
2015-11-21	Win	(France) Sliman Zegnoun	Thai Fight 2015: 2nd Round	Thailand	Decision (Unanimous)	3	3:00
2015-10-24	Win	(Cambodia) Keo Rumchong	Thai Fight 2015: First Round	Vietnam	Decision (Unanimous)	5	3:00
2015-09-17	Win	(Russia) Vladimir Shuliak	THAI Proud to Be Thai 2015: Moscow	Moscow, Russia	Decision (Unanimous)	3	3:00
2015-08-22	Win	(France) Yohann Drai	THAI FIGHT Proud to Be Thai 2015: 100 Years Narathiwat	Narathiwat, Thailand	Decision (Unanimous)	3	3:00
2015-07-18	Win	(Russia) Kazbek Zubairaev	THAI FIGHT Proud to Be Thai 2015: China	Zhengzhou, China	KO (Right Flying Knee)	2	
2015-05-02	Win	(Spain) Marc Dass Rey	THAI FIGHT Proud to Be Thai 2015: Samui	Thailand	KO (Right Cross)	2	
2015-04-04	Win	(Cambodia) Pich Seha	THAI FIGHT Proud to Be Thai 2015: CRMA	Nakhon Nayok, Thailand	Decision (Unanimous)	3	3:00
2014-12-21	Win	(Myanmar) Saping Yu (Tha Pyay Nyo)	Thai Fight 2014 Final Round	Bangkok, Thailand	Decision (Unanimous)	3	3:00
2014-11-22	Win	(France) Daniel Manzoni	Thai Fight 2014: 2nd Round	Khon Kaen, Thailand	KO	2	
2014-09-20	Loss	(Canada) Sean Kearny	THAI FIGHT World Battle 2014: Vietnam	Ho Chi Minh City, Vietnam	Decision (Unanimous)	3	3:00
2014-08-16	Win	(Brazil) Alex Oller	THAI FIGHT World Battle 2014: Nakhon Sawan	Nakhon Sawan, Thailand	Decision (Unanimous)	3	3:00
2014-06-28	Loss	(Switzerland) Christophe Pruvost	THAI FIGHT World Battle 2014: Macau	Macau, China	Ex.R Decision (Unanimous)	4	3:00
2014-04-06	Win	(Russia) Batyr Ruskorgoloev	THAI FIGHT World Battle 2014: Chakrinaruebet	Sattahip, Thailand	Ex.R Decision (Unanimous)	4	3:00
2014-02-22	Win	(Brazil) Jose Neto	THAI FIGHT World Battle 2014: Klai Kang Won	Hua Hin, Thailand	Decision (Unanimous)	3	3:00
2013-12-22	Win	(Cambodia) Vung Noy	Thai Fight 2013: Final Round	Bangkok, Thailand	KO (Right Knee to the Body)	1	
2013-11-30	Win	(Myanmar) Htet Aung Oo	Thai Fight 2013: 2nd Round	Bangkok, Thailand	Decision (Unanimous)	3	3:00
2013-06-29	Win	(Brazil) Hugo Nunes	THAI FIGHT Extreme 2013: Bangkok	Bangkok, Thailand	Decision (Unanimous)	3	3:00
2013-04-19	Loss	(Thailand) Fahmongkol Sor Jor Dangrayong	THAI FIGHT Extreme 2013: Pattaya	Pattaya, Thailand	Decision (Unanimous)	3	3:00
2013-02-23	Win	(Iran) Behzad Rafigh Doust	THAI FIGHT Extreme 2013: Muay Thai Day	Ayutthaya, Thailand	Decision (Unanimous)	3	3:00
2012-12-16	Win	(Italy) Angelo Veniero	Thai Fight 2012: Final Round	Bangkok, Thailand	KO (Right Elbow to the Body)	1	
2012-11-25	Win	(Italy) Simone Cecchini	Thai Fight 2012: 2nd Round	Nakhon Ratchasima, Thailand	Decision (Unanimous)	3	3:00
2012-01-14	Loss	(Thailand) Superbon Banchamek	Isuzu Cup 22 Tournament Semi Final, Omnoi Stadium	Bangkok, Thailand	Decision	5	3:00
2011-07-23	Win	(Thailand) Sitthichai Sitsongpeenong	Fuktien Group Tournament, Omnoi Stadium	Bangkok, Thailand	TKO (Broken Collar Bone)	5	
Wins the Fuktien Group Tournament title (147 lbs) and Omnoi Stadium Welterweight title (147 lbs).
2011-06-11	Win	(Thailand) Saksurin Cafefarsai	Fuktien Group Tournament, Omnoi Stadium	Bangkok, Thailand	Decision	5	3:00
2011-05-14	Loss	(Thailand) Sitthichai Sitsongpeenong	Fuktien Group Tournament, Omnoi Stadium	Bangkok, Thailand	Decision	5	3:00
2011-04-09	Win	(Thailand) Songniyom Pumpanmuang	Fuktien Group Tournament	Bangkok, Thailand	Decision	5	3:00
2011-03-05	Win	(Thailand) Longern Tungsongthaksin	Fuktien Group Tournament	Bangkok, Thailand	Decision	5	3:00
2008-03-31	Win	(Thailand) Lerdsila Chumpairtour	Daorungchujarern Fights, Rajadamnern Stadium	Bangkok, Thailand	Decision	5	3:00
2007-	Loss	(Thailand) Jaroenchai Kesagym		Bangkok, Thailand	Decision	5	33:00
For the WMC World Lightweight (135 lbs) title.
Legend: Win Loss Draw/No contest Notes

== Lethwei record ==
Professional Lethwei record
0 wins, 2 losses, 2 draws
Date	Result	Opponent	Event	Location	Method	Round	Time
2019-11-09	Loss	(Myanmar) Thway Thit Win Hlaing	(64th) Kayin State Day	Hpa-an, Myanmar	KO	4	
2018-08-05	Loss	(Myanmar) Soe Lin Oo	Myanmar vs. Thailand Challenge Fights	Yangon, Myanmar	KO	3	2:22
2017-07-16	Draw	(Myanmar) Phyan Thway	Myanmar vs. Thailand Challenge Fights	Yangon, Myanmar	Draw	5	3:00
2017-03-19	Draw	(Myanmar) Saw Gaw Mu Do	Lethwei Fight 2	Yangon, Myanmar	Draw	5	3:00
Legend: Win Loss Draw/No contest Notes
