= Samy Sana =

Algerian Muay Thai kickboxer (born 1988)

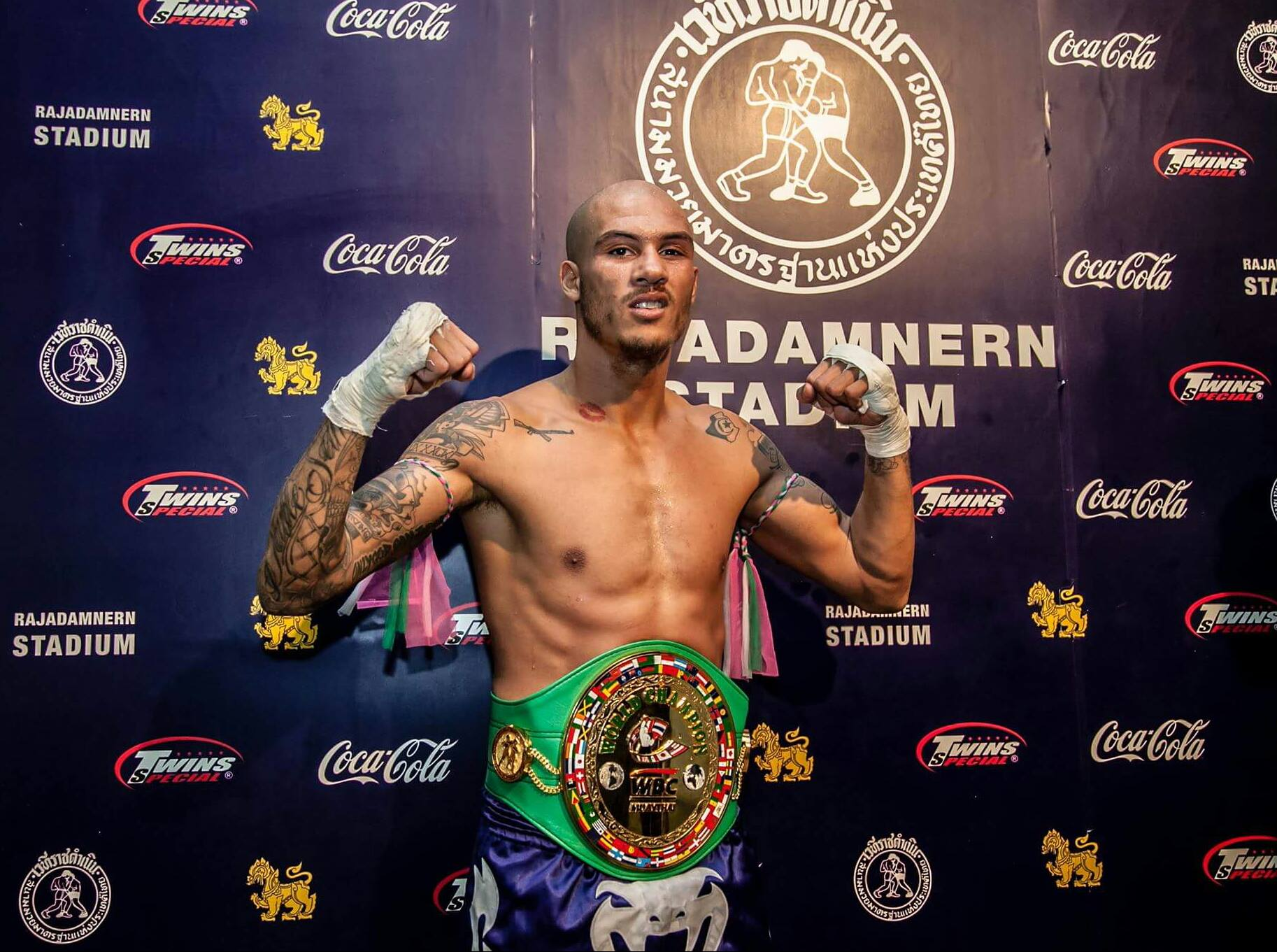
- Born: 10 December 1988 (age 37); Paris, France
- Other names: Terminator, AK-47
- Height: 190 cm (6 ft 3 in)
- Weight: 70 kg (154 lb; 11 st 0 lb)
- Division: Super middleweight Middleweight; Light middleweight
- Style: Muay Thai (Muay Mat / Muay Bouk)
- Fighting out of: Thailand
- Team: Phenix Muay Thai Paris; Venum Training Camp Thailand
- Trainer: Alassane Gaye & Bernard Defretin
- Years active: 2001 – present

Kickboxing record
- Total: 152
- Wins: 135
- By knockout: 49
- Losses: 15
- By knockout: 1
- Draws: 2

Other information
- Boxing record from BoxRec

Samy Sana (born 10 December 1988) is an Algerian Muay Thai kickboxer and mixed martial artist. He is the former ISKA, WBC Muaythai Interim Super Middleweight champion and fought in ONE Championship.

In August 2020, he was ranked the #7 lightweight in the world by Combat Press.

== Biography and career ==
=== Early career ===
On 16 June 2013, Samy Sana won the Wicked One Tournament in the 70 kg light middleweight division by defeating Guimba Coulibaly by knockout and Kevin Renahy by decision in one night.

On 4 October 2013, for the A1 World Middleweight Championship, Sana lost to Tass Tsitsiras in Springvale, Australia, by DQ, after a knee illegally struck Tsitsiras in the throat. Tsitsiras could no longer continue. It was ruled a disqualification.

At the "Best of Siam" event held at Rajadamnern Stadium on 27 May 2016, Sana defeated Eakchanachai Kaewsamrit via third-round knockout to win the WBC Muaythai World Super Middleweight (75 kg) Championship.

Samy Sana defeated Fernando Calzetta at the joint event between Oktagon and Bellator on 9 December 2017 to win the ISKA Muay Thai World Middleweight (72.5 kg) Championship.

On 17 March 2018, Samy Sana defeated both Kevin Renahy and Zakaria Laaouatni in the same night in Tours, France to win the "La Nuit Des Titans" 72.5 kg middleweight tournament.

=== ONE Championship ===
Samy Sana made his ONE Championship debut on 29 June 2018 at ONE Championship: Spirit of a Warrior in Yangon, Myanmar, where he lost to Sorgraw Petchyindee by unanimous decision. He then defeated Armen Petrosyan by unanimous decision at ONE Championship: Conquest of Champions in Manila on 23 November 2018. Next, he lost to Jo Nattawut by unanimous decision at ONE Championship: Clash of Legends in Bangkok on 16 February 2019.

==== ONE Featherweight Kickboxing World Grand Prix ====
Sana was announced as one of the participants in the ONE Super Series Featherweight Kickboxing World Grand Prix, which included Giorgio Petrosyan, Yodsanklai Fairtex, and Phetmorakot Petchyindee Academy. In the Grand Prix Quarter-Final, which took place at ONE Championship: Enter the Dragon in Kallang, Singapore on 17 May 2019, he upset Yodsanklai Fairtex in a three-round unanimous decision victory which saw him knock down Yodsanklai. His win over Yodsanklai was voted the "Upset of the Year" by Combat Press.

After his upset win over Yodsanklai, he was scheduled to face Dzhabar Askerov in the Grand Prix Semi-Final at ONE Championship: Dreams of Gold in Bangkok on 16 August 2019, where he went on to win by majority decision in a fight that saw Sana scoring a knockdown on Askerov.

He is scheduled to face Giorgio Petrosyan in the Featherweight Kickboxing World Grand Prix Final at ONE Championship: Century in Tokyo on 13 October 2019. On 13 October 2019, Samy Sana lost to Giorgio Petrosyan in the Kickboxing World Grand Prix Final by unanimous decision.

Following his run in the Featherweight Grand Prix, Sana was one of four French kickboxers to enter the ONE Championship rankings.

==== Post-Grand Prix ====
He returned to action at S47S, when he fought Martin Meoni. Sana won the fight by unanimous decision.

Samy Sana was scheduled to fight at ONE Championship: Collision Course 2 on 25 December 2020, where faced Jamal Yusupov. Both fighters held upset victories over Yodsanklai Fairtex. In a fight that saw him get knocked down in the second round, Sana lost by unanimous decision.

==== 2021 Kickboxing Grand Prix ====
On 3 September 2021, it was announced that Sana would be one of eight participants in the 2021 ONE Kickboxing Featherweight Grand Prix. He will face Chingiz Allazov at ONE Championship: First Strike. Sana lost the fight in 39 seconds via liver punch, suffering the first knockout loss of his career.

== Titles and achievements ==
- ONE Championship
  - 2019 ONE Kickboxing Featherweight World Grand Prix Runner-up
- Nuit des Titans
  - 2018 Nuit des Titans Tournament Champion (-72.5 kg)
- International Sport Karate Association
  - 2017 ISKA World Muay Thai Championship (-72.5 kg)
- WBC Muay Thai
  - 2016 W.B.C. Interim Super Middlweight Championship (-75 kg)
- Wicked One
  - 2013 Wicked One Tournament Champion (-71 kg).
- Fédération française de kick boxing, muay thaï et disciplines associées
  - 2012 French Muay Thai Champion (-71 kg)
  - 2011 French Muay Thai Champion (-71 kg)
- Combat Press
  - 2019 Upset of the Year vs. Yodsanklai Fairtex

== Muay Thai & Kickboxing record ==
Kickboxing record
135 Wins (49 (T)KO's), 15 Losses, 2 Draws
Date	Result	Opponent	Event	Location	Method	Round	Time
2021-10-15	Loss	(Belarus) Chingiz Allazov	ONE: First Strike	Kallang, Singapore	KO (Punch to the Body)	1	0:39
2021 ONE Featherweight Kickboxing World Grand Prix Quarterfinal.
2020-12-25	Loss	(Russia) Jamal Yusupov	ONE: Collision Course 2	Kallang, Singapore	Decision (Unanimous)	3	3:00
2020-10-03	Win	(Italy) Martin Meoni	S47S	Paris, France	Decision (Unanimous)	3	3:00
2019-10-13	Loss	(Italy) Giorgio Petrosyan	ONE: Century – Part 2	Tokyo, Japan	Decision (Unanimous)	3	3:00
2019 ONE Featherweight Kickboxing World Grand Prix Final.
2019-08-16	Win	(Russia) Dzhabar Askerov	ONE: Dreams of Gold	Bangkok, Thailand	Decision (Majority)	3	3:00
2019 ONE Featherweight Kickboxing World Grand Prix Semifinal.
2019-05-17	Win	(Thailand) Yodsanklai Fairtex	ONE: Enter the Dragon	Kallang, Singapore	Decision (Unanimous)	3	3:00
2019 ONE Featherweight Kickboxing World Grand Prix Quarterfinal.
2019-02-16	Loss	(Thailand) Jo Nattawut	ONE: Clash of Legends	Bangkok, Thailand	Decision (Unanimous)	3	3:00
2018-11-23	Win	(Italy) Armen Petrosyan	ONE: Conquest of Champions	Manila, Philippines	Decision (Unanimous)	3	3:00
2018-06-29	Loss	(Thailand) Sorgraw Petchyindee	ONE: Spirit of a Warrior	Yangon, Myanmar	Decision (Unanimous)	3	3:00
2018-03-17	Win	(France) Zakaria Laaouatni	La Nuit Des Titans	Tours, France	Decision	3	3:00
Wins La Nuit Des Titans - 72.5 kg Tournament.
2018-03-17	Win	(France) Kevin Renahy	La Nuit Des Titans	Tours, France	Decision	3	3:00
La Nuit Des Titans - 72.5 kg Tournament Semi-Finals.
2018-02-24	Win	(Russia) Rashid Salikhov	ACB KB 13: From Paris with war	Paris, France	Decision (Unanimous)	3	3:00
2017-12-09	Win	(Italy) Fernando Calzetta	Oktagon Bellator	Florence, Italie	Decision	3	3:00
Wins the ISKA World Muay Thai Championship (-72.5 kg).
2017-10-28	Draw	(Democratic Republic of the Congo) Alka Matewa	Duel 2	Paris, France	Draw	3	3:00
2017-07-17	Win	(Italy) Saro Presti	Le Choc Des Gladiateurs	Lavandou, France	Decision (Unanimous)	3	3:00
2017-02-25	Win	(Germany) Ramon Kubler	Ilyrian Fight Night II	Winterthour, Switzerland	TKO (Doctor Stoppage)	2	3:00
2016-05-27	Win	(Thailand) Eakchanachai Kaewsamrit	Best of Siam Rajadamnern	Bangkok, Thailand	KO (Punch)	3	2:15
Wins the W.B.C. World Muay Thai Championship (-75 kg).
2015-10-25	Draw	(Thailand) Nontachai Sitsae	Max Muay Thai Pattaya – 73 kg	Pattaya, Thailand	Decision	3	3:00
2015-06-19	Win	(France) Raphaël Llodra	Best of Siam 6	Paris, France	Decision	5	3:00
2015-01-31	Loss	(Thailand) Diesellek TopkingBoxing	Emperor Chok Dee	Nancy, France	Decision	5	3:00
2014-08-16	Loss	(Thailand) Thongchai Sitsongpeenong	2014 TopKing World Series 2	Saint-Quentin-en-Yvelines, France	Decision	3	3:00
2014-08-16	Loss	(France) Yohan Lidon	2014 A1 WCC -75 kg/165 lb K1 rules	Lyon, France	Decision	3	3:00
2014-08-16	Loss	(Thailand) Sudsakorn Sor Klinmee	2014 Thai Fight -72.5 kg/154 lb Kard Chuek Fight	Nakhon Sawan	Decision	3	3:00
2014-07-26	Loss	(France) Walid Haddad	Le Choc des Gladiateurs XIII	France	Decision	3	3:00
2014-06-14	Win	(Thailand) Yodpayak Sitsongpeenong	Best Of Siam 5	Paris, France	Décision	5	3:00
2014-05-17	Win	(Spain) Ibrahima Njie Jarra	Impact Fight Night -72.5 kg/154 lb	Bordeaux, France	Décision	3	3:00
2014-03-08	Win	(Thailand) Armin Pumpanmuang Windy Sport	Le Choc des Légendes	Saint-Ouen, France	KO	5	3:00
2014-02-15	Win	(France) Youssef Sid	Wicked One Tournament -70 kg/154 lb Tournament, Finals	Paris, France	Decision	5	3:00
2013-11-30	Loss	(Thailand) Yodsanklai Fairtex	2013 Thai Fight -70 kg/154 lb Tournament, Semi Finals	Bangkok	Decision	3	3:00
2013-11-15	Win	(Thailand) Wannamoon Nuttapong	Muay Thai League Paris Carpentier	Paris, France	KO	5	3:00
2013-10-23	Win	(United States) Chike Lindsay	2013 Thai Fight -70 kg/154 lb Tournament, Quarter Finals	Bangkok	Décision	3	3:00
2013-10-04	Loss	(Australia) Tass Tsitsiras	A1 World Middleweight Title	Springvale, Victoria	DQ (Throat Strike)	1	
2013-06-16	Win	(France) Kevin Renahy	Wicked One Tournament -70 kg/154 lb Tournament, Semi Finals	Paris, France	Decision	3	3:00
2013-06-16	Win	(France) Guimba Coulibaly	Wicked One Tournament -70 kg/154 lb Tournament, Quarter Finals	Paris, France	KO	3	3:00
2013-05-04	Win	(Belgium) Elias Achergui	La Nuit des Combattants 3	Persan, France	KO	5	3:00
2013-03-30	Win	(France) Sébastien Billard	Gala Méru	Méru, France	KO	5	3:00
2013-03-09	Draw	(France) Moussa Dembélé	Pantin Muay Thaï 2	Pantin, France	Decision	5	3:00
2013-02-15	Win	(France) Farid El Bannoudi	Show Thaï 6	Aubervilliers, France	Decision	5	3:00
2012-12-15	Loss	(Czechoslovakia) Michal Krcmar	Vecer Bojovniku Thajskeho Boxu 4	Prague, Czech Republic	Decision	5	3:00
2012-10-20	Loss	(France) Karim Bezzouh	Golden Fight	La Courneuve, France	Decision	5	3:00
2012-10-06	Loss	(Slovenia) Jan Mazur	Noc Bojov 3	Orava, Slovakia	Decision	3	3:00
2012-09-22	Win	(Turkey) Uno Karaoglan	Superpro Fight Night 4	Basel, Switzerland	Decision	3	3:00
2012-09-22	Win	(Belgium) Claudio Baressi	Superpro Fight Night 4	Basel, Switzerland	Decision	3	3:00
2012-03-03	Win	(France) Kevin Martens	Shock Muay Thaï 4	Saint-Denis, France	Décision	5	3:00
2011-05-07	Win	(France) Amine Bouhannani	Thai Max 2	Palavas-les-Flots, France	KO	5	3:00
2011-02-26	Win	(France) Anthony Valle	Thai Max	Palavas-les-Flots, France	KO	5	3:00
Legend: Win Loss Draw/No contest Notes

== See also ==
- List of male kickboxers
- List of WBC Muaythai world champions
