= Tawanchai P.K. Saenchaimuaythaigym =

Thai professional Muay Thai fighter and kickboxer

Tawanchai P.K.Saenchai
- Born: Narongsak Kaewmala; April 7, 1999 (age 27); Pattaya, Thailand
- Native name: ณรงค์ศักดิ์ แก้วมาลา
- Other names: Jatukam Petchrungruang; Tawanchai Chor.Thaiset
- Nickname: กัน (ฉายา: ซ้ายดารา)
- Height: 180 cm (5 ft 11 in)
- Division: Featherweight; Lightweight; Welterweight; Featherweight (ONE)
- Reach: 178 cm (70 in)
- Style: Muay Thai (Muay Tae)
- Stance: Southpaw
- Fighting out of: Bangkok, Thailand
- Team: P.K. Saenchai Muaythaigym

Kickboxing record
- Total: 168
- Wins: 134
- Losses: 32
- Draws: 2

Narongsak Kaewmala (Thai: ณรงค์ศักดิ์ แก้วมาลา; born April 7, 1999), known professionally as Tawanchai P.K.Saenchai (Thai: ตะวันฉาย พี.เค.แสนชัย) is a professional Muay Thai fighter and kickboxer. He currently competes in the Featherweight division of ONE Championship, where he is the former ONE Featherweight Muay Thai World Champion. As of September 22, 2026, he is ranked #1 in the ONE Featherweight Muay Thai rankings.

== Biography ==
Tawanchai was born in Pattaya, he started his fighting career at Petchrungruang gym under the name Jatukam Petchrungruang when he was eight years old. He moved to Bangkok and made his debut in Lumpinee Stadium at the age of 14.

In 2015, Tawanchai moved to P.K.Saenchaimuaythaigym in Southern Bangkok.

He quickly made a name for himself and jumped up multiple weight classes at a time. In 2017 he won the Thailand 126 lbs Title by defeating Wayunoi Petchkiatpetch.

On September 7, 2018, Tawanchai defeated Muay Thai Fighter of the Year 2017 Kulabdam Sor Jor Piekuthai. Kulabdam and his team were convinced that he could win a rematch and negotiated for another fight only weeks later, Tawanchai won again and went into the trilogy fight with confidence. Tawanchai would end up winning all three fights and the 6 million baht worth of side bet during the third fight, positioning himself as one of the best fighters in the country. For his results during the year 2018 he received multiple fighter of the year awards.

He would confirm his status on March 26, 2019, with a stoppage win over Sangmanee Sor Tienpo at the Parunchai Birthday show; Sangmanee had never been stopped in his career. Sangmanee won the rematch by decision 3 months later, handing his first loss to Tawanchai in almost 2 years.

On July 27, 2019, Tawanchai fought for the first time under kickboxing rules for the Wu Lin Feng World Cup in China, it was his first fight outside of Thailand and he won by decision.

=== ONE Championship ===
On October 4, 2020, it was announced that Tawanchai had signed with ONE Championship.

Tawanchai faced Sean Clancy at ONE Championship: Dangal on May 15, 2021. He won the bout via head kick knockout at the beginning of the third round.

Tawanchai was originally scheduled to face Saemapetch Fairtex at ONE Championship: Battleground 3. However, Saemapetch was forced to withdraw from the event after one of his cornermen tested positive for COVID-19. He then fought Sitthichai Sitsongpeenong at ONE Championship: Battleground 3 under Muay Thai rules. Their pre-recorded match aired on August 27, 2021. Tawanchai lost the fight by split decision.

Tawanchai faced Saemapetch Fairtex at ONE: Heavy Hitters on January 14, 2022. He won the bout via right hook knockout in the first round.

Tawanchai faced Niclas Larsen at ONE 158 on June 3, 2022. He won the bout after knocking out Larsen in the second round with a left cross.

==== ONE Featherweight Muay Thai World Champion ====
Tawanchai faced Petchmorakot Petchyindee Academy for the ONE Featherweight Muay Thai World Championship at ONE 161 on September 29, 2022. He won the fight by unanimous decision.

Tawanchai made his first title defense against Jamal Yusupov on February 25, 2023, at ONE Fight Night 7. He won the bout via a leg kick knockout in the first round.

Tawanchai faced Davit Kiria in a kickboxing bout at ONE Fight Night 13 on August 5, 2023. He won the bout in the third round due to a kick breaking Kiria's right arm.

Tawanchai was scheduled to defense the title against Superbon Singha Mawynn on October 7, 2023, at ONE Fight Night 15. However, Superbon was forced to pulled out due to a leg injury. He was replaced by Jo Nattawut in a kickboxing bout. Tawanchai won the fight via unanimous decision.

The match between Tawanchai and Superbon for the ONE Featherweight Muay Thai World Championship was rescheduled on December 9, 2023, at ONE Fight Night 17. Tawanchai withdrew from the fight with a viral infection on November 4, 2023. Tawanchai won the fight by unanimous decision.

In the third title defense, Tawanchai faced Jo Nattawut in a rematch on June 8, 2024, at ONE 167. He won the fight via majority decision.

For his fourth title defense, Tawanchai was scheduled to face Jo Nattawut in a trilogy on November 8, 2024, at ONE 169. However, the bout was removed from the event due to Nattawut injury after losing via knockout against Superbon Singha Mawynn at ONE Friday Fights 81.

The rematch between Tawanchai and Superbon for the ONE Featherweight Muay Thai World Championship took place on January 24, 2025, at ONE 170. He won the fight via second round technical knockout and this win earned the $50,000 Performance of the Night bonus.

Tawanchai faced Masaaki Noiri for the interim ONE Featherweight Kickboxing World Championship on March 23, 2025, at ONE 172. He lost the fight via technical knockout in round three upset.

On December 19, 2025, Tawanchai faced Liu Mengyang at ONE Friday Fights 137. He lost the fight by first round technical knockout in 52 seconds after breaking his leg following a low kick.

== Titles and accomplishments ==
- ONE Championship
  - ONE Featherweight Muay Thai World Championship (One time; current) (four defenses)
  - Performance of the Night (Three times) vs. Davit Kiria, Jamal Yusupov and Niclas Larsen
  - 2022 Muay Thai Fighter of the Year
  - 2022 Breakout Star of the Year
  - 2024: Ranked #5 Fight of the Year vs. Jo Nattawut
- Lumpinee Stadium
- Professional Boxing Association of Thailand (PAT)
  - 2017 Thailand Featherweight (126 lbs) Champion
- Nai Khanom Tom
  - 2018 Nai Khanom Tom Champion

=== Awards ===
- 2018 Sports Authority of Thailand Fighter of the Year
- 2018 Siam Kela Fighter of the Year Award
- 2023-24 Sports Writers Association of Thailand modified Muay Thai Fighter of the Year

== Fight record ==
Muay Thai & Kickboxing record
134 Wins, 32 Losses, 2 Draws
Date	Result	Opponent	Event	Location	Method	Round	Time
2025-12-19	Loss	(China) Liu Mengyang	ONE Friday Fights 137, Lumpinee Stadium	Bangkok, Thailand	TKO (Broken Leg/Low Kick)	1	0:52
2025-03-23	Loss	(Japan) Masaaki Noiri	ONE 172	Saitama, Japan	TKO (Referee Stoppage)	3	1:55
For the interim ONE Featherweight Kickboxing World Championship.
2025-01-24	Win	(Thailand) Superbon Singha Mawynn	ONE 170	Bangkok, Thailand	TKO (3 Knockdowns)	2	1:10
Defends the ONE Featherweight Muay Thai World Championship.
2024-06-08	Win	(Thailand) Jo Nattawut	ONE 167	Bangkok, Thailand	Decision (Majority)	5	3:00
Defended the ONE Featherweight Muay Thai World Championship.
2023-12-22	Win	(Thailand) Superbon Singha Mawynn	ONE Friday Fights 46, Lumpinee Stadium	Bangkok, Thailand	Decision (Majority)	5	3:00
Defended the ONE Featherweight Muay Thai World Championship.
2023-10-07	Win	(Thailand) Jo Nattawut	ONE Fight Night 15	Bangkok, Thailand	Decision (Unanimous)	3	3:00
2023-08-05	Win	(Georgia (country)) Davit Kiria	ONE Fight Night 13	Bangkok, Thailand	TKO (Broken Arm/Middle Kick)	3	0:30
2023-02-25	Win	(Russia) Jamal Yusupov	ONE Fight Night 7	Bangkok, Thailand	TKO (Leg Kick)	1	0:49
Defended the ONE Featherweight Muay Thai World Championship.
2022-09-29	Win	(Thailand) Petchmorakot Petchyindee Academy	ONE 161	Kallang, Singapore	Decision (Unanimous)	5	3:00
Won the ONE Featherweight Muay Thai World Championship.
2022-06-03	Win	(Denmark) Niclas Larsen	ONE 158	Kallang, Singapore	KO (Left Cross)	2	1:42
2022-01-14	Win	(Thailand) Saemapetch Fairtex	ONE: Heavy Hitters	Kallang, Singapore	KO (Left Cross)	1	2:55
2021-08-27	Loss	(Thailand) Sitthichai Sitsongpeenong	ONE: Battleground 3	Kallang, Singapore	Decision (Split)	3	3:00
2021-05-15	Win	(Republic of Ireland) Sean Clancy	ONE: Dangal	Kallang, Singapore	KO (Head Kick)	3	0:35
2020-09-26	Win	(Thailand) Sangmanee Sor Tienpo	Rueso Fight + Kiatpetch	Narathiwat Province, Thailand	Decision	5	3:00
2020-08-16	Win	(Thailand) Nuenglanlek Jitmuangnon	Channel 7 Boxing Stadium	Bangkok, Thailand	Decision	5	3:00
2020-01-11	Loss	(China) Jia Aoqi	Wu Lin Feng 2020: -67kg World Cup 2019-2020 Final, Semi Final	Zhuhai, China	TKO (Punches)	2	
2019-11-30	Win	(Spain) David Mejia	Wu Lin Feng 2019: -67kg World Cup 2019-2020 6th Group Stage	Zhengzhou, China	Ext.R Decision (Split)	4	3:00
2019-09-29	Win	(China) Ji Xiang	Wu Lin Feng 2019: -67kg World Cup 2019-2020 4th Group Stage	Zhengzhou, China	Decision (Unanimous)	3	3:00
2019-09-06	Win	(Thailand) Chujaroen Dabransarakarm	Lumpinee Stadium	Bangkok, Thailand	Decision	5	3:00
2019-07-27	Win	(China) Zhang Wensheng	Wu Lin Feng 2019: -67kg World Cup 2019-2020 2nd Group Stage	Zhengzhou, China	Decision (Split)	3	3:00
2019-06-26	Loss	(Thailand) Sangmanee Sor Tienpo	RuamponkonSamui + Kiatpetch Super Fight	Surat Thani, Thailand	Decision	5	3:00
2019-03-26	Win	(Thailand) Sangmanee Sor Tienpo	Parunchai Birthday	Thung Song, Thailand	KO (High Kick)	4	1:45
2018-12-07	Win	(Thailand) Nuenglanlek Jitmuangnon	Lumpinee Stadium	Bangkok, Thailand	TKO (Referee Stoppage)	5	0:40
2018-11-08	Win	(Thailand) Kulabdam Sor.Jor.Piek-U-Thai	Lumpinee Stadium	Bangkok, Thailand	Decision	5	3:00
Wins the 6 million baht side-bet.
2018-10-05	Win	(Thailand) Kulabdam Sor.Jor.Piek-U-Thai	Muay Thai Expo: The Legend of Muay Thai	Buriram, Thailand	Decision	5	3:00
2018-09-07	Win	(Thailand) Kulabdam Sor.Jor.Piek-U-Thai	Lumpinee Stadium	Bangkok, Thailand	Decision	5	3:00
2018-07-10	Win	(Thailand) Nuenglanlek Jitmuangnon	Lumpinee Stadium	Bangkok, Thailand	Decision	5	3:00
2018-06-05	Win	(Thailand) Ferrari Jakrayanmuaythai	Lumpinee Stadium	Bangkok, Thailand	Decision	5	3:00
2018-03-28	Win	(Thailand) Yok Parunchai	WanParunchai + Poonseua Sanjorn	Nakhon Si Thammarat, Thailand	Decision	5	3:00
2017-12-26	Win	(Thailand) Yok Parunchai	Lumpinee Stadium	Bangkok, Thailand	Decision	5	3:00
2017-11-25	Win	(Thailand) Mongkolchai Kwaitonggym	Kriatpetch Super Fight	Krabi, Thailand	Decision	5	3:00
2017-09-09	Win	(Thailand) Mongkolchai Kwaitonggym	Lumpinee Stadium	Bangkok, Thailand	Decision	5	3:00
2017-08-06	Loss	(Thailand) Mongkolchai Kwaitonggym	Channel 7 Boxing Stadium	Bangkok, Thailand	Decision	5	3:00
2017-06-09	Win	(Thailand) Chalam Parunchai	Lumpinee Stadium	Bangkok, Thailand	Decision	5	3:00
2017-04-27	Draw	(Thailand) Phetwason Ansukhumvit	Lumpinee Stadium	Bangkok, Thailand	Decision	5	3:00
2017-03-28	Loss	(Thailand) Tito Hoywanpohchana	Lumpinee Stadium	Bangkok, Thailand	Decision	5	3:00
2017-02-18	Win	(Thailand) Wayunoi Phetkiatphet	Lumpinee Stadium	Bangkok, Thailand	Decision	5	3:00
Wins the Thailand Featherweight (126 lbs) title.
2016-11-29	Win	(Thailand) Kumantong Jitmuangnon	Lumpinee Stadium	Bangkok, Thailand	Decision	5	3:00
2016-10-01	Win	(Thailand) Worrawut M.U.Den	Lumpinee Stadium	Bangkok, Thailand	Decision	5	3:00
2016-08-23	Loss	(Thailand) Wanmechok Puhongtong	Lumpinee Stadium	Bangkok, Thailand	Decision	5	3:00
2016-07-17	Win	(Thailand) Chaila Por.Lakboon	Channel 7 Boxing Stadium	Bangkok, Thailand	KO	4	
2016-06-17	Win	(Thailand) Singtongnoi Kiatkittipan	Lumpinee Stadium	Bangkok, Thailand	KO	4	
2016-05-03	Loss	(Thailand) Nongview Phetkoson	Lumpinee Stadium	Bangkok, Thailand	Decision	5	3:00
2016-02-10	Win	(Thailand) Kongsak Sor.Satra	Lumpinee Stadium	Bangkok, Thailand	Decision	5	3:00
2016-01-16	Win	(Thailand) Noomsurin Chor.Ketveena	Siam Omnoi Boxing Stadium	Thailand	Decision	5	3:00
2015-12-04	Loss	(Thailand) Petchrung Sitnayokkaipaedriew	Lumpinee Stadium	Bangkok, Thailand	Decision	5	3:00
2015-11-14	Win	(Thailand) Yodsaenkeng Jor.Nopparat	Lumpinee Stadium	Bangkok, Thailand	Decision	5	3:00
2015-11-03	Loss	(Thailand) Peemai Erawan	Lumpinee Stadium	Bangkok, Thailand	Decision	5	3:00
2015-09-29	Win	(Thailand) Peemai Erawan	Lumpinee Stadium	Bangkok, Thailand	Decision	5	3:00
2015-06-30	Win	(Thailand) Yodpayak Phor.Jaroenpeth	Lumpinee Stadium	Bangkok, Thailand	Decision	5	3:00
2015-03-02	Loss	(Thailand) Gingsanglek Tor.Laksong	Rajadamnern Stadium	Bangkok, Thailand	Decision	5	3:00
2015-01-11	Win	(Thailand) Kompai Sor.Jullasen	Lumpinee Stadium	Bangkok, Thailand	KO	4	
2014-10-24	Win	(Thailand) Phetbansen Sor.Jor.Lekmuangnont	Lumpinee Stadium	Bangkok, Thailand	Decision	5	3:00
Legend: Win Loss Draw/No contest Notes
