= Ihosvany Garcia =

Cuban boxer (born 1995)

Personal information
- Born: Ihosvany Rafael Garcia Torres; 25 October 1995 (age 31) Santiago de Cuba, Cuba
- Height: 6 ft 0 in (183 cm)
- Weight: Super middleweight

Boxing career
- Reach: 73 in (185 cm)
- Stance: Orthodox

Boxing record
- Total fights: 17
- Wins: 17
- Win by KO: 12
- Losses: 0
- Draws: 0
- No contests: 0

Ihosvany Rafael Garcia Torres (born 25 October 1995) is a Cuban professional boxer.

== Professional career ==
=== 2020 ===
Garcia made his professional debut on December 11, 2020, against Michał Łoniewski. Garcia won the fight via a third-round TKO.

=== 2021 ===
His next fight came on April 23, 2021, against Dominik Szalczyk. Garcia won the fight via a first-round TKO.

His next fight came on May 30, 2021, against Bartłomiej Grafka. Garcia won the fight via a first-round TKO.

His next fight came on August 21, 2021, against Damian Smagiel. Garcia won the fight via a Unanimous Decision.

His next fight came on October 9, 2021, against Nabil Zaky. Garcia won the fight via a first-round knockout.

His next fight came on November 21, 2021, against Przemysław Gorgoń. Garcia won the fight via a fifth-round TKO.

=== 2022 ===
His next fight came on March 26, 2022, against Patrick Rokohl. Garcia won the fight via a third-round TKO.

His next fight came on June 25, 2022, against Ryno Liebenberg. Garcia won the fight via a Unanimous Decision.

His next fight came on November 5, 2022, against Mirsad Čebo. Garcia won the fight via a first-round knockout.

=== 2023 ===
After nearly a year out from competitive bouts, he returned on October 7, 2023, against Iago Kiziria. Garcia won the fight via a Unanimous Decision.

His next fight came on November 4, 2023, against Orlando de Jesus Estrada. Garcia won the fight via a first-round corner retirement.

=== 2024 ===
His next fight came on February 24, 2024, against Dmytro Fedas. Garcia won the fight via a fifth-round TKO.

His next fight came on May 24, 2024, against decorated kickboxer Łukasz Pławecki. Garcia won the fight via a second-round knockout.

His next fight came on October 26, 2024, against Gabriel Omar Diaz. Garcia won the fight via Unanimous Decision.

=== 2025 ===
After another near year-long layoff, he returned on October 4, 2025, against Andrii Velikovskyi. Garcia won the fight via a Unanimous Decision.

== Professional boxing record ==
17 fights	17 wins	0 losses
By knockout	12	0
By decision	5	0

No.	Result	Record	Opponent	Type	Round, time	Date	Location	Notes
17	Win	17–0	Andrii Velikovskyi	KO	7 (8), 3:00	24 Oct 2026	Nosalowy Dwór, Zakopane, Poland	
16	Win	16–0	Vladimir Belujsky	TKO	3 (8), 0:01	15 Mar 2026	Hala Widowiskowo-Sportowa, Jastrzębie-Zdrój, Poland	
15	Win	15–0	Andrii Velikovskyi	UD	8	4 Oct 2025	Nosalowy Dwór, Zakopane, Poland	
14	Win	14–0	Gabriel Omar Diaz	UD	8	26 Oct 2024	Nosalowy Dwór, Zakopane, Poland	
13	Win	13–0	Łukasz Pławecki	KO	2 (8), 0:40	24 May 2024	Hala Podpromie, Rzeszów, Poland	
12	Win	12–0	Dmytro Fedas	TKO	5 (8), 1:47	24 Feb 2024	Opera i Filharmonia Podlaska, Białystok, Poland	
11	Win	11–0	Orlando De Jesus Estrada	RTD	1 (8), 3:00	4 Nov 2023	Nosalowy Dwór, Zakopane, Poland	
10	Win	10–0	Iago Kiziria	UD	6	7 Oct 2023	Hala Widowiskowo-Sportowa, Jastrzębie-Zdrój, Poland	
9	Win	9–0	Mirsad Čebo	KO	1 (8), 1:11	5 Nov 2022	Hala RCS, Lubin, Poland	
8	Win	8–0	Ryno Liebenberg	UD	10	25 Jun 2022	Arena Toruń, Toruń, Poland	
7	Win	7–0	Patrick Rokohl	TKO	3 (10), 2:15	26 Mar 2022	Będzin Arena, Będzin, Poland	
6	Win	6–0	Przemysław Gorgoń	TKO	5 (8), 2:40	21 Nov 2021	Dwór Artusa, Toruń, Poland	
5	Win	5–0	Nabil Zaky	KO	1 (8), 1:28	9 Oct 2021	Hala Widowiskowo-Sportowa, Węgierska Górka, Poland	
4	Win	4–0	Damian Smagiel	UD	6	21 Aug 2021	Twoja Stocznia, Gdańsk, Poland	
3	Win	3–0	Bartłomiej Grafka	TKO	1 (8), 3:00	30 May 2021	Hala Widowisko-Sportowa, Stężyca, Poland	
2	Win	2–0	Dominik Szalczyk	TKO	1 (6), 2:03	23 Apr 2021	Olivia Business Centre, Gdańsk, Poland	
1	Win	1–0	Michał Łoniewski	TKO	3 (4), 0:45	11 Dec 2020	Hala Sportowo-Widowiskowa, Wielki Klincz, Poland	
