= ONE Friday Fights 46 =

Combat sport events in 2023

ONE Friday Fights 46: Tawanchai vs. Superbon
- The poster for ONE Friday Fights 46: Tawanchai vs. Superbon
- Promotion: ONE Championship
- Date: December 22, 2023
- Venue: Lumpinee Boxing Stadium
- City: Bangkok, Thailand

Event chronology
ONE Friday Fights 45: Otop vs. Şen	ONE Friday Fights 46: Tawanchai vs. Superbon	ONE Fight Night 18: Gasanov vs. Oh

ONE Friday Fights 46: Tawanchai vs. Superbon (also known as ONE Lumpinee 46) was a combat sport event produced by ONE Championship that took place on December 22, 2023, at Lumpinee Boxing Stadium in Bangkok, Thailand.

== Background ==
A ONE Featherweight Muay Thai World Championship bout between current champion Tawanchai P.K.Saenchai and former ONE Featherweight Kickboxing World Champion Superbon Singha Mawynn headlined the event. The pairing was previously scheduled to headline at ONE Fight Night 15, but Superbon was forced to pulled out due to a leg injury. The second was scheduled to headline at ONE Fight Night 17, but Tawanchai withdrew from the fight due to being hospitalized with a viral infection.

A ONE Strawweight Muay Thai World Championship title unification bout between current champion Joseph Lasiri and former champion/current interim title holder Prajanchai P.K.Saenchai took place at the event. The pairing previously met at ONE 157, with Lasiri winning the title by TKO (retirement) in round three.

An interim ONE Women's Atomweight Kickboxing World Championship bout between Phetjeeja Lukjaoporongtom and former Glory Women's Super Bantamweight champion Anissa Meksen also took place at the event.

== Results ==
Fight card (PPV at Watch ONE)
Weight class				Method	Round	Time	Notes
Featherweight Muay Thai	Tawanchai P.K.Saenchai (c)	def.	Superbon Singha Mawynn	Decision (majority)	5	3:00	(Note: For the ONE Featherweight Muay Thai World Championship.Originally a unanimous decision win for Tawanchai; the scorecard was updated.)
Strawweight Muay Thai	Prajanchai P.K.Saenchai (ic)	def.	Joseph Lasiri (c)	KO (elbow)	1	1:28	(Note: For the ONE Strawweight Muay Thai World Championship.)
Women's Atomweight Kickboxing	Phetjeeja Lukjaoporongtom	def.	Anissa Meksen	Decision (unanimous)	5	3:00	(Note: For the interim ONE Women's Atomweight Kickboxing World Championship.)
Bantamweight Muay Thai	Nico Carrillo	def.	Nong-O Hama	KO (elbow)	2	1:28
Catchweight (140 lbs) Muay Thai	Saeksan Or. Kwanmuang	def.	River Daz	Decision (split)	3	3:00
Preliminary card (YouTube / Watch ONE)
Catchweight (136 lbs) Muay Thai	Nabil Anane	def.	Muangthai P.K.Saenchai	Decision (unanimous)	3	3:00
Bantamweight Muay Thai	Kulabdam Sor.Jor.Piek-U-Thai	def.	Fariya Aminipour	KO (punch to the body)	1	2:51
Flyweight Muay Thai	Jawsuayai Sor.Dechaphan	def.	Phetsukumvit Boybangna	Decision (majority)	3	3:00
Bantamweight Muay Thai	Suablack Tor.Pran49	def.	Craig Coakley	KO (punch to the body)	1	2:15
Catchweight (132 lbs) Muay Thai	Chorfah Tor.Sangtiennoi	def.	Eisaku Ogasawara	KO (punch)	2	0:57
Catchweight (132 lbs) Muay Thai	Suriyanlek Por.Yenying	def.	Yodkritsada Sor.Sommai	KO (punch)	2	0:15

== Bonus awards ==
The following fighters were awarded bonuses:

- Performance of the Night ($50,000): Prajanchai P.K.Saenchai
- Performance of the Night ($10,000): Kulabdam Sor.Jor.Piek-U-Thai, Jawsuayai Sor.Dechaphan, Phetsukumvit Boybangna, Suablack Tor.Pran49, Chorfah Tor.Sangtiennoi and Suriyanlek Por.Yenying

== See also ==
- 2023 in ONE Championship
- List of ONE Championship events
- List of current ONE fighters
