= Superbon Singha Mawynn =

Thai professional Muay Thai fighter and kickboxer (born 1990)

Superbon
- Born: Suppachai Muensang; 16 August 1990 (age 36); Pattalung, Thailand
- Native name: ศุภชัย หมื่นสังข์
- Other names: Superbon Banchamek; Superbon Lookjaomaesaivare
- Height: 177 cm (5 ft 10 in)
- Division: Lightweight; welterweight; super welterweight; middleweight
- Reach: 182 cm (72 in)
- Style: Muay Thai (Muay Femur); kickboxing
- Stance: Orthodox
- Fighting out of: Bangkok, Thailand
- Team: Banchamek Gym; Superbon Training Camp; Singha Mawynn Muaythai; Khun Suek Muay Thai
- Trainer: Buakaw Banchamek; Suthat Muangmun (Trainer Gae)

Kickboxing record
- Total: 154
- Wins: 117
- By knockout: 29
- Losses: 37
- By knockout: 5

Suppachai Muensang (Thai: ศุภชัย หมื่นสังข์; born 16 August 1990), known professionally as Superbon Singha Mawynn (Thai: ซุปเปอร์บอน สิงห์มาวิน), is a Thai professional Muay Thai fighter and kickboxer. He is currently signed to ONE Championship, where he is the current and two-time ONE Featherweight Kickboxing World Champion. He is also the 2016 Kunlun Fight World Max Tournament Champion and 2018 Enfusion Live 76 8-Man Tournament Champion.

As of November 2024, Beyond Kickboxing ranked him as the #2 Lightweight and #2 pound-for pound kickboxer.

He is one of only two fighters to have knocked out Giorgio Petrosyan and one of only three to have beaten him. He also holds wins over fighters such as Sitthichai Sitsongpeenong, Marat Grigorian and Jomthong Chuwattana.

== Career ==
Superbon is a teammate of Buakaw Banchamek. More recently, he is a devoted student of Ajarn Gae, who is considered one of the world's best Muay Thai trainers.

=== Kunlun Fight ===
He started his kickboxing career in 2015 and in the same year participated in the Kunlun Fight 64-man 70 kg tournament. He finished as a semi finalist being defeated by the tournament champion Sitthichai Sitsongpeenong.

In the 2016 edition of that tournament, he avenged his loss against Sitthichai Sitsongpeenong in the quarter finals and eventually became the 70-kg champion, defeating Cedric Manhoef in the semi-finals before knocking out Jomthong Chuwattana in the final event.

Superbon participated in the 2017 Kunlun Fight World Max 70kg Tournament. He finished as the tournament runner-up after getting knocked out by Marat Grigorian in the finals.

=== Enfusion ===
On 8 December 2017, Superbon entered the one-night Enfusion Live 58 72 kg Tournament. He came up short of winning the tournament after losing to Endy Semeleer in the final round by unanimous decision.

He returned to Enfusion at Enfusion Live 76 on 7 December 2018. He went on to defeat Marouan Toutouh by unanimous decision to win the Enfusion Live 72.5 kg Tournament.

=== ONE Championship ===
After signing with ONE Championship, Superbon made his debut at ONE Championship: No Surrender on 31 July 2020, facing Sitthichai Sitsongpeenong in a trilogy fight. He went on to defeat Sitthichai by unanimous decision.

==== ONE Featherweight Kickboxing Champion ====
Superbon faced Giorgio Petrosyan for the inaugural ONE Featherweight Kickboxing World Championship at ONE Championship: First Strike on 15 October 2021. He stopped the favourite via right high-kick in the second round, becoming just the second fighter to knock out Petrosyan, as well as being crowned the first ONE Featherweight Kickboxing World Champion.

Superbon made his first title defense against Marat Grigorian at ONE: X on 25 March 2022. After dominating all five rounds, Superbon won the rematch with Grigorian and retained the ONE Featherweight Kickboxing World Championship by unanimous decision.

Superbon was scheduled to his second title defense against the 2021 ONE Featherweight Kickboxing World Grand Prix Champion Chingiz Allazov at ONE on Prime Video 2 on 1 October 2022. Allazov withdrew with an injury on 21 September and was replaced by the #5 ranked ONE lightweight contender Tayfun Özcan. Superbon withdrew from the fight the day before it was supposed to take place, as he wasn't medically cleared to compete. His fight with Allazov was rescheduled for ONE on Prime Video 5 on 3 December 2022. In turn, Superbon was forced to withdraw due to an illness and the bout was moved to headline at ONE on Prime Video 6 on 14 January 2023. He lost the bout and title via knockout in the second round.

==== Post-title reign ====
After loss to Allazov, Superbon faced Tayfun Özcan at ONE Fight Night 11 on 9 June 2023. He won the fight by second-round knockout, knocking Tayfun out with a head kick. The win earned him a $50,000 Performance of the Night bonus.

Superbon was scheduled to face Tawanchai P.K.Saenchai for the ONE Featherweight Muay Thai World Championship on 7 October 2023, at ONE Fight Night 15. However, Superbon was forced to pulled out due to a leg injury. The match was rescheduled on 9 December 2023, at ONE Fight Night 17. Tawanchai withdrew from the fight with a viral infection on 4 November 2023. The bout was rescheduled for ONE Friday Fights 46 on 22 December 2023. Superbon lost the fight by majority decision.

Superbon faced Marat Grigorian for the interim ONE Featherweight Kickboxing World Championship at ONE Friday Fights 58 on 5 April 2024. Superbon won by unanimous decision to become the interim ONE Featherweight Kickboxing World Champion.

Superbon faced Jo Nattawut at ONE Friday Fights 81 on 27 September 2024. He won the fight by a first-round knockout.

The rematch between Superbon and Tawanchai P.K.Saenchai for the ONE Featherweight Muay Thai World Championship took place on 24 January 2025, at ONE 170. He lost the fight via second round technical knockout.

== Titles and accomplishments ==
=== Kickboxing ===
==== Professional ====
- Kunlun Fight
  - 2016 Kunlun Fight World Max Tournament Champion
- Enfusion
  - 2018 Enfusion Live 76 Abu Dhabi: 8-Man Tournament winner
- La Nuit Des Champions
  - 2019 La Nuit Des Champions -70 kg Champion
- International Professional Combat Council (IPCC)
  - 2019 IPCC Kickboxing World -70 kg Champion (one defense)
- ONE Championship
  - Interim ONE Featherweight Kickboxing World Championship (one time)
  - ONE Featherweight Kickboxing World Championship (two times; current)
    - One successful title defense
  - Performance of the Night (one time) vs. Tayfun Ozcan
  - 2021: ONE Super Series Knockout of the Year vs. Giorgio Petrosyan
  - 2021: ONE Super Series Fighter of the Year
  - 2024: Ranked#2 Knockout of the Year vs. Jo Nattawut

=== Muay Thai ===
==== Professional ====
- Professional Boxing Association of Thailand (PAT)
  - 2010 Thailand Lightweight (135 lbs) Champion (1 defense)
- Muay Thai Warriors
  - 2013 Muay Thai Warriors Super Welterweight (154 lbs) Champion
- M-ONE
  - 2013 M-ONE Middleweight (160 lbs) Champion
- World Boxing Council Muaythai
  - 2014 WBC Muay Thai Intercontinental Welterweight (147 lbs) Champion
- Omnoi Stadium
  - 2012 22nd Isuzu Cup Tournament runner-up

==== Amateur ====
- International Federation of Muaythai Amateur (IFMA)
  - 2015 IFMA Royal World Cup Tournament Championships in Bangkok, Thailand (gold) -71 kg
  - 2016 IFMA World Muaythai Championships in Jönköping, Sweden (gold) -71 kg
  - 2017 IFMA World Muaythai Championships in Minsk, Belarus (gold) -71 kg
  - 2017 IFMA World Muaythai at the World Games in Wroclaw, Poland (gold) -71 kg

=== Awards ===
- Combat Press
  - 2016 Breakout Fighter of the Year

== Fight record ==
Muay Thai & kickboxing record
117 wins (29 TKOs), 37 losses
Date	Result	Opponent	Event	Location	Method	Round	Time
2025-11-16	Win	(Japan) Masaaki Noiri	ONE 173	Tokyo, Japan	Decision (unanimous)	5	3:00
Defended and unified the ONE Featherweight Kickboxing World Championship.
2025-01-24	Loss	(Thailand) Tawanchai P.K. Saenchaimuaythaigym	ONE 170	Bangkok, Thailand	TKO (3 knockdowns)	2	1:10
For the ONE Featherweight Muay Thai World Championship.
2024-09-27	Win	(Thailand) Jo Nattawut	ONE Friday Fights 81	Bangkok, Thailand	KO (elbow)	1	1:43
2024-04-05	Win	(Armenia) Marat Grigorian	ONE Friday Fights 58	Bangkok, Thailand	Decision (unanimous)	5	3:00
Wins the interim ONE Featherweight Kickboxing World Championship.
2023-12-22	Loss	(Thailand) Tawanchai P.K. Saenchaimuaythaigym	ONE Friday Fights 46	Bangkok, Thailand	Decision (majority)	5	3:00
For the ONE Muay Thai Featherweight Championship
2023-06-10	Win	(Turkey) Tayfun Ozcan	ONE Fight Night 11	Bangkok, Thailand	KO (left high kick)	2	1:46
2023-01-14	Loss	(Belarus) Chingiz Allazov	ONE Fight Night 6	Bangkok, Thailand	KO (punches)	2	1:03
Loses the ONE Featherweight Kickboxing World Championship.
2022-03-25	Win	(Armenia) Marat Grigorian	ONE: X	Kallang, Singapore	Decision (unanimous)	5	3:00
Defended the ONE Featherweight Kickboxing World Championship.
2021-10-15	Win	(Italy) Giorgio Petrosyan	ONE Championship: First Strike	Kallang, Singapore	KO (right high kick)	2	0:20
Wins the inaugural ONE Featherweight Kickboxing World Championship.
2020-07-31	Win	(Thailand) Sitthichai Sitsongpeenong	ONE Championship: No Surrender	Bangkok, Thailand	Decision (unanimous)	3	3:00
2019-11-16	Win	(Portugal) Wilson Varela	La Nuit Des Champions	Marseille, France	Decision	5	3:00
Wins La Nuit des Champions and defends IPCC -70kg title.
2019-03-30	Win	(Spain) Maykel Garcia	Enfusion Tenerife	Torre-Pacheco, España	Decision (unanimous)	3	3:00
Wins the IPCC -70kg World Championship.
2019-03-09	Win	(Portugal) Luis Passos	All Star Fight	Phuket, Thailand	KO (hooks to the body)	1	
2018-12-07	Win	(Morocco) Marouan Toutouh	Enfusion Live 76 - 72.5kg 8 Man Tournament, Final	Abu Dhabi, United Arab Emirates	Decision (unanimous)	3	3:00
Wins the Enfusion Live 72.5kg Tournament.
2018-12-07	Win	(Portugal) Diogo Calado	Enfusion Live 76 - 72.5kg 8 Man Tournament, Semi Finals	Abu Dhabi, United Arab Emirates	Decision (unanimous)	3	3:00
2018-12-07	Win	(Morocco) Aziz Khallah	Enfusion Live 76 - 72.5kg 8 Man Tournament, Quarter Finals	Abu Dhabi, United Arab Emirates	Decision (unanimous)	3	3:00
2018-09-09	Win	(Democratic Republic of the Congo) Nayanesh Ayman	Kunlun Fight 76	Zhangqiu, China	Decision (unanimous)	3	3:00
2018-07-06	Win	(Germany) Fabian Hundt	All Star Fight 5	Prague, Czech Republic	TKO (four knockdowns/punches)	3	2:20
2018-06-01	Win	(Belarus) Dzianis Zuev	Kunlun Fight Macau	Macau, China	Decision (unanimous)	3	3:00
2018-02-04	Loss	(Armenia) Marat Grigorian	Kunlun Fight 69 - World MAX 2017, Final	Guyang, China	KO (punch)	1	0:29
The Fight Was For 2017 Kunlun Fight World Max Tournament Champion Tournament.
2018-02-04	Win	(Ukraine) Sergey Kulyaba	Kunlun Fight 69 - World MAX 2017, Semi Finals	Guyang, China	Decision (majority)	3	3:00
2017-12-08	Loss	(Netherlands) Endy Semeleer	Enfusion Live 58 - 72kg 8 Man Tournament, Final	Abu Dhabi, United Arab Emirates	Decision (unanimous)	3	3:00
The Fight Was For Enfusion Live 72kg Tournament.
2017-12-08	Win	(Morocco) Nordin Ben Moh	Enfusion Live 58 - 72kg 8 Man Tournament, Semi Finals	Abu Dhabi, United Arab Emirates	Ext R. decision (unanimous)	4	3:00
2017-12-08	Win	(Netherlands) Regilio van Den Ent	Enfusion Live 58 - 72kg 8 Man Tournament, Quarter Finals	Abu Dhabi, United Arab Emirates	Decision (unanimous)	3	3:00
2017-11-12	Win	(Georgia (country)) Davit Kiria	Kunlun Fight 67 - World MAX 2017 Final 8	Sanya, China	Decision (majority)	3	3:00
Qualified to Kunlun Fight 2017 70kg World Max Tournament Final 4.
2017-09-30	Win	(Morocco) Mohamed Khamal	Enfusion Live 53	Antwerp, Belgium	Decision (unanimous)	3	3:00
2017-08-27	Win	(Democratic Republic of the Congo) Nayanesh Ayman	Kunlun Fight 65 - World MAX 2017 Final 16	Qingdao, China	Decision (majority)	3	3:00
Qualified to Kunlun Fight 2017 70kg World Max Tournament Final 8.
2017-06-10	Win	(Russia) Artem Pashporin	Kunlun Fight 62	Bangkok, Thailand	Decision (unanimous)	3	3:00
2017-03-11	Win	(Spain) Edye Ruiz	Kunlun Fight 58/ Magnum Fc 1	Rome, Italy	Decision (unanimous)	3	3:00
2017-01-01	Win	(Thailand) Jomthong Chuwattana	Kunlun Fight 56 - World Max Tournament 2016, Final	Sanya, China	KO (right hook)	3	2:40
Wins the Kunlun Fight World Max Tournament Champion and Qualified to Kunlun Fight 2017 70kg World Max Tournament Final 16.
2017-01-01	Win	(Suriname) Cedric Manhoef	Kunlun Fight 56 - World Max Tournament 2016, Semi Finals	Sanya, China	Decision (unanimous)	3	3:00
2016-09-24	Win	(Thailand) Sitthichai Sitsongpeenong	Kunlun Fight 53 - World Max Tournament 2016 Final 8	Beijing, China	Decision (unanimous)	3	3:00
Qualified to Kunlun Fight 2016 70kg World Max Tournament Final 4.
2016-07-31	Win	(Russia) Khayal Dzhaniev	Kunlun Fight 48 - World Max Tournament 2016 Final 16	Jining, China	KO (right high kick)	2	1:19
Qualified to Kunlun Fight 2016 70kg World Max Tournament Final 8.
2016-03-25	Win	(Czech Republic) Martin Gano	Kunlun Fight 40 - World Max 2016 Group E Tournament Final	Tongling, China	KO (right head knee)	2	1:40
Qualified to Kunlun Fight 2016 70kg World Max Tournament Final 16.
2016-03-25	Win	(China) Chen Zhicheng	Kunlun Fight 40 - World Max 2016 Group E Tournament Semi Finals	Tongling, China	KO (left high kick)	3	2:57
2016-02-21	Win	(Australia) Hussein Al Mansouri	Kunlun Fight 38	Pattaya, Thailand	Decision (unanimous)	3	3:00
2016-01-23	Loss	(Thailand) Sitthichai Sitsongpeenong	Kunlun Fight 37 - World Max Tournament 2015, Semi Finals	Sanya, China	KO (right hook)	2	0:39
2015-12-19	Win	(China) Zhang Chunyu	Kunlun Fight 35 - World Max Tournament 2015 Final 8	Luoyang, China	KO (left high kick)	2	1:24
Qualified to Kunlun Fight 2015 70kg World Max Tournament Final.
2015-11-28	Win	(Thailand) Watcharalak Orkawmuang	Super Muay Thai Workpoint	Bangkok, Thailand	Decision	3	3:00
2015-09-28	Win	(China) Zheng Zhaoyu	Kunlun Fight 31 - World Max Tournament 2015 Final 16	Bangkok, Thailand	KO (knee to the body)	2	1:03
Qualified to Kunlun Fight 2015 70kg World Max Tournament Final 8.
2015-05-15	Win	(China) Deng Li	Kunlun Fight 25 - World Max 2015 Group I Tournament Final	Banská Bystrica, Slovakia	KO (left knee to the body)	2	1:38
Qualified to Kunlun Fight 2015 70kg World Max Tournament Final 16.
2015-05-15	Win	(Poland) Lukasz Plawecki	Kunlun Fight 25 - World Max 2015 Group I Tournament Semi Finals	Banská Bystrica, Slovakia	Decision (unanimous)	3	3:00
2014-08-15	Win	(Brazil) Amadeu Cristiano	Chiang Rai WBC Muaythai Championship	Chiang Rai, Thailand	KO	2	
Wins the WBC Intercontinental Welterweight title.
2013-11-23	Win	(Spain) Ibrahima Njie	Muay Thai Warriors - España vs Tailandia	Madrid, Spain	Decision (unanimous)	5	3:00
2013-10-26	Loss	(Australia) Toby Smith	REAL HERO - Australia vs Thailand	Sydney, Australia	Decision (unanimous)	3	3:00
2013-06-28	Win	(France) Yacine Drakrim	Muay Thai Warriors - Dabble in Chiang Mai	Chiang Mai, Thailand	Decision (unanimous)	5	3:00
Defends Muay Thai Warriors Light Middleweight title.
2013-05-16	Win	(United Kingdom) Craig Jose	M-ONE Reborn	United Kingdom	Decision (unanimous)	5	3:00
Wins M-ONE Middleweight belt.
2013-04-05	Win	(Australia) Victor Nagbe	Muay Thai Warriors - Thailand vs World, Pattaya Boxing World Stadium	Pattaya, Thailand	KO (left elbow)	3	
Wins Muay Thai Warriors Light Middleweight title.
2012-11-04	Win	(Uganda) Umar Semata	Muay Thai Warriors In The Relation	Phnom Penh, Cambodia	Decision	5	3:00
2012-06-17	Win	(Australia) Kym Johnson	Sphinx Showdomn	North Geelong, Australia	Decision		3:00
2012-05-18	Win	(Australia) Mike 300 Demetriou		Melbourne, Australia	Decision		3:00
2012-03-24	Loss	(Thailand) Singmanee Kaewsamrit	Isuzu Cup 22 Tournament Final, Omnoi Stadium	Bangkok, Thailand	Decision	5	3:00
The Fight Was For 22nd Isuzu Cup Tournament Welterweight Champion (147 lbs).
2012-01-14	Win	(Thailand) Iquezang Kor.Rungthanakeat	Isuzu Cup 22 Tournament Semi Final, Omnoi Stadium	Bangkok, Thailand	Decision	5	3:00
2011-11-26	Win	(Thailand) Saenchainoi Pumphanmuang	Isuzu Cup 22 Tournament, Omnoi Stadium	Bangkok, Thailand	Decision	5	3:00
2011-10-22	Win	(Thailand) Phetasawin Seatranferry	Isuzu Cup 22 Tournament, Omnoi Stadium	Bangkok, Thailand	Decision	5	3:00
2011-09-10	Win	(Thailand) Saksurin Kiatyongyuth	Isuzu Cup 22 Tournament, Omnoi Stadium	Bangkok, Thailand	Decision	5	3:00
2011-07-01	Loss	(Thailand) Sirimongkol Sitanuparb	Toyota Vigo Marathon Tournament 2011, Final	Songkhla, Thailand	Decision	3	3:00
The fight was for Toyota Vigo Marathon Tournament Championship.
2011-07-01	Win	(Iran) Toofan Salafzoon	Toyota Vigo Marathon Tournament 2011, Semi Final	Songkhla, Thailand	TKO (doctor stoppage)	2	
2011-07-01	Win		Toyota Vigo Marathon Tournament 2011, Quarter Final	Songkhla, Thailand			
2011-05-24	Win	(Thailand) Eakpracha Meenayothin	Wanwirapon, Lumpinee Stadium	Bangkok, Thailand	Decision	3	3:00
2011-04-29	Win	(Iran) Behzad Rafigh Doust	Prince Thailand Birthday	Ayodhya, Thailand	Decision	3	3:00
2010-10-05	Win	(Thailand) Singdam Kiatmuu9	Lumpinee Champion Krikkrai, Lumpinee Stadium	Bangkok, Thailand	Decision	5	3:00
Defends Thailand (PAT) Lightweight Champion (135 lbs).
2010-09-07	Win	(Thailand) Pansak Look Bor.Kor	Phetsupapan, Lumpinee Stadium	Bangkok, Thailand	Decision	5	3:00
Wins the Thailand (PAT) Lightweight Champion (135 lbs).
2010-08-13	Loss	(Thailand) Saenchai P.K.SenchaimuaythaiGym	Hatyai Stadium	Hatyai, Thailand	Decision	5	3:00
2010-03-05	Loss	(Thailand) Singdam Kiatmuu9	Lumpinee Champion Krikkrai, Lumpinee Stadium	Bangkok, Thailand	Decision	5	3:00
2010-02-09	Win	(Thailand) Singdam Kiatmuu9	Wanwerapon, Lumpinee Stadium	Bangkok, Thailand	Decision	5	3:00
2009-12-15	Win	(Thailand) Tuantong Pumphanmuang	Petsupapan, Lumpinee Stadium	Bangkok, Thailand	Decision	5	3:00
2009-11-24	Win	(Thailand) Pettanong Petfergus	Wanwerapon, Lumpinee Stadium	Bangkok, Thailand	Decision	5	3:00
2009-10-02	Win	(Thailand) Kaew Fairtex	Petsupapan, Lumpinee Stadium	Bangkok, Thailand	Decision	5	3:00
2009-08-11	Loss	(Thailand) Sarawut Lukbanyai	Petsupapan, Lumpinee Stadium	Bangkok, Thailand	Decision	5	3:00
2009-06-26	Win	(Thailand) Sarawut Lukbanyai	Petsupapan, Lumpinee Stadium	Bangkok, Thailand	Decision	5	3:00
2008-12-26	Win	(Thailand) Pansak Look Bor.Kor	Saengsawangpanpa, Lumpinee Stadium	Bangkok, Thailand	Decision	5	3:00
2008-06-03	Win	(Thailand) Dokmaipa Wor Sungprapai	Phetsupapan, Lumpinee Stadium	Bangkok, Thailand	Decision	5	3:00
2008-03-14	Win	(Thailand) Yodthuanthong F.A.Group	Phetpiya, Lumpinee Stadium	Bangkok, Thailand	Decision	5	3:00
2007-01-27	Loss	(Thailand) Sanaengam Erawan	Omnoi Stadium	Samut Sakhon, Thailand	Decision	5	3:00
2006-12-10	Loss	(Thailand) Punyai Payakkhampan	Channel 7 Stadium	Bangkok, Thailand	Decision	5	3:00
2006-09-29	Loss	(Thailand) Palangnoom Hlamthongkarnpat	Kiatphet, Lumpinee Stadium	Bangkok, Thailand	Decision	5	3:00
2006-08-22	Loss	(Thailand) Mongkonchai Phetsupapan	Phetsupapan, Lumpinee Stadium	Bangkok, Thailand	Decision	5	3:00
2006-07-28	Win	(Thailand) Kayasit Chuwatana	Khunsuk Takoonyang, Lumpinee Stadium	Bangkok, Thailand	Decision	5	3:00
2006-06-16	Win	(Thailand) Ritijak Kaewsamrit	Phetsupapan, Lumpinee Stadium	Bangkok, Thailand	Decision	5	3:00
2006-04-07	Loss	(Thailand) Oley Kor.Kittisakgym	Phetsupapan, Lumpinee Stadium	Bangkok, Thailand	TKO	3	
2006-02-25	Win	(Thailand) Hokoon Sitkhruwath	Muaythai Lumpinee Krikkrai, Lumpinee Stadium	Bangkok, Thailand	Decision	5	3:00
2006-01-13	Loss	(Thailand) Denwadto Sor.Sommai	Phetsupapan, Lumpinee Stadium	Bangkok, Thailand	Decision	5	3:00
2005-10-04	Win	(Thailand) Harnpo Por.Telakun	Phetsupapan, Lumpinee Stadium	Bangkok, Thailand	Decision	5	3:00
Legend: Win Loss Draw/no contest Notes

Amateur Muay Thai record
The accurate record is unknown.
Date	Result	Opponent	Event	Location	Method	Round	Time
2018-03-13	Loss	(Thailand) Yodwicha Khemmuaythaigym	Army Games 68	Thailand	Decision	3	3:00
2017-07-30	Win	(Iran) Masoud Minaei	I.F.M.A. World Muaythai at The World Games 2017, Final -71 kg	Wroclaw, Poland	Decision (split)	3	3:00
Wins the I.F.M.A. World Muaythai at the World Games Gold Medal -71 kg.
2017-07-29	Win	(Peru) Gabriel Mazzetti	I.F.M.A. World Muaythai at The World Games 2017, Semi Finals -71 kg	Wroclaw, Poland	Decision (unanimous)	3	3:00
2017-07-28	Win	(Belgium) Dimitar Markov	I.F.M.A. World Muaythai at The World Games 2017, Quarter Finals -71 kg	Wroclaw, Poland	TKO (knee to the body)	1	
2017-05-12	Win	(Belarus) Vadim Vaskov	I.F.M.A. World Muaythai Championships 2017, Finals -71 kg	Minsk, Belarus	Walkover		
Wins the I.F.M.A. World Muaythai Championships Gold Medal -71 kg.
2017-05-10	Win	(Sweden) Habib Abdallah	I.F.M.A. World Muaythai Championships 2017, Semi Finals -71 kg	Minsk, Belarus	Decision (unanimous)	3	3:00
2017-05-08	Win	(Russia) Ivan Kosykh	I.F.M.A. World Muaythai Championships 2017, Quarter Finals -71 kg	Minsk, Belarus	TKO (corner stoppage)	1	
2017-05-06	Win	(Morocco) Soufiane Taaouati	I.F.M.A. World Muaythai Championships 2017, Eighth Finals -71 kg	Minsk, Belarus	KO (flying high kick)	2	
2016-05-29	Win	(Canada) Sean Kearney	I.F.M.A. World Muaythai Championships 2016, Finals -71 kg	Jönköping, Sweden	Decision (unanimous)	3	3:00
Wins the I.F.M.A. World Muaythai Championships Gold Medal -71 kg.
2016-05-26	Win	(Belarus) Andrei Kulebin	I.F.M.A. World Muaythai Championships 2016, Semi Finals -71 kg	Jönköping, Sweden	Decision (unanimous)	3	3:00
2016-05-23	Win	(Ukraine) Oleksandr Stomatov	I.F.M.A. World Muaythai Championships 2016, Quarter Finals -71 kg	Jönköping, Sweden	Decision (unanimous)	3	3:00
2015-08-23	Win	(Belarus) Andrei Kulebin	I.F.M.A. Royal World cup Tournament 2015, Finals -71 kg	Bangkok, Thailand	Decision	3	3:00
Wins the I.F.M.A. Royal World cup Tournament Gold Medal -71 kg.
2015-08-21	Win	(Ukraine) Oleksandr Moisa	I.F.M.A. Royal World cup Tournament 2015, Semi Finals -71 kg	Bangkok, Thailand	Decision	3	3:00
2015-08-17	Win	(Russia) Ivan Kosykh	I.F.M.A. Royal World cup Tournament 2015, Quarter Finals -71 kg	Bangkok, Thailand	Decision	3	3:00
2015-08-14	Win	(Finland) Teemu Hellevaara	I.F.M.A. Royal World cup Tournament 2015, Eighth Finals -71 kg	Bangkok, Thailand	TKO	2	
Legend: Win Loss Draw/no contest Notes

== Filmography ==
=== Web shows ===
Year	Title	Role	Notes	Ref.
2025	Physical: Asia	Contestant		
