= ONE Fight Night 17 =

Combat sport events in 2023

ONE Fight Night 17: Kryklia vs. Roberts
- The poster for ONE Fight Night 17: Kryklia vs. Roberts
- Promotion: ONE Championship
- Date: December 9, 2023
- Venue: Lumpinee Boxing Stadium
- City: Bangkok, Thailand

Event chronology
ONE Friday Fights 44: Yod-IQ vs. Musaev	ONE Fight Night 17: Kryklia vs. Roberts	ONE Friday Fights 45: Otop vs. Şen

ONE Fight Night 17: Kryklia vs. Roberts was a Muay Thai event produced by ONE Championship that took place on December 9, 2023, at Lumpinee Boxing Stadium in Bangkok, Thailand. It marked the first event that was only a Muay Thai card.

== Background ==
A ONE Featherweight Muay Thai World Championship bout between current champion Tawanchai P.K.Saenchai and former ONE Featherweight Kickboxing champion Superbon Singha Mawynn was expected to headline the event. The pairing was previously scheduled to headline at ONE Fight Night 15, but Superbon was forced to pulled out due to a leg injury. However, Tawanchai withdrew from the fight due to hospitalized with a viral infection. The fight was rescheduled at ONE Friday Fights 46 on December 22.

An inaugural ONE Heavyweight Muay Thai World Championship bout between the ONE Light Heavyweight Kickboxing World Champion (also the 2022 ONE Heavyweight Kickboxing World Grand Prix winner) Roman Kryklia and Alex Roberts headlined the event.

Niclas Larsen was expected to face Jo Nattawut in a featherweight muay thai bout at the event. However, he withdrew from the bout due to injury and was replaced by promotional newcomer Luke Lessei.

A bantamweight muay thai rematch between Saemapetch Fairtex and Felipe Lobo was expected to take place at the event. The pairing previously met at ONE Fight Night 9, with Lobo won by knockout in round three. However, Lobo withdrew due to injury and was replaced by promotional newcomer Mohamed Younes Rabah.

At the weigh-ins, the match between Thongpoon P.K.Saenchai and Ellis Badr Barboza was moved to 132.25 pounds due to the pairing missed weight; Nguyễn Trần Duy Nhất weight in at 139.75 pounds, 4.75 pounds over the flyweight limit and he was fined 25% of his purse, which went to Denis Purić; Johan Ghazali weight in at 141 pounds, 6 pounds over the flyweight limit and he was fined 50% of his purse, which went to Edgar Tabares; Mohamed Younes Rabah weight in at 151.75 pounds, 1.75 pounds over the 150 pounds catchweight limit and he was fined 25% of his purse, which went to Saemapetch Fairtex.

== Results ==
Main card (Amazon Prime Video)
Weight class				Method	Round	Time	Notes
Heavyweight	Roman Kryklia	def.	Alex Roberts	KO (punch)	2	0:25	(Note: For the inaugural ONE Heavyweight Muay Thai World Championship.)
Featherweight	Jo Nattawut	def.	Luke Lessei	Decision (unanimous)	3	3:00
Catchweight (150 lb)	Mohamed Younes Rabah	def.	Saemapetch Fairtex	KO (punches)	1	2:29	(Note: Younes Rabah missed weight (151.75 lb).)
Lightweight	Dmitry Menshikov	def.	Mouhcine Chafi	KO (punches)	1	1:59
Flyweight	Jacob Smith	def.	Walter Goncalves	KO (knee)	1	2:54
Flyweight	Johan Ghazali	def.	Edgar Tabares	KO (punches)	1	0:36	(Note: Ghazali missed weight (141 lb).)
Flyweight	Denis Purić	def.	Nguyễn Trần Duy Nhất	KO (punch)	2	1:35	(Note: Nguyễn missed weight (139.75 lb).)
Catchweight (120 lbs)	Ellis Badr Barboza	vs.	Thongpoon P.K.Saenchai	NC (overturned)	3	2:21	(Note: Thongpoon (130.5 lb) and Barboza (132.25 lb) missed weight. Originally a KO (punch to the body) win for Barboza; overturned after he tested positive for at least one prohibited substance.)

== Bonus awards ==
The following fighters received $50,000 bonuses.

- Performance of the Night: Roman Kryklia, Dimitry Menshikov and Jacob Smith

== See also ==
- 2023 in ONE Championship
- List of ONE Championship events
- List of current ONE fighters
