= List of current ONE fighters =

The ONE Championship (formerly known as "ONE Fighting Championship") promotion was started in 2011.

This list is an up-to-date roster of those fighters currently under contract with the ONE Championship brand. Fighters are organized by weight class and within their weight class by their number of fights with the promotion.

== Notes ==
1. Results of fighting within development leagues (ONE Warriors series, ONE Hero series & Road to ONE) not counted for ONE Championship Records.

== Recent signings ==
The fighters in this section have either signed with the ONE, have recently returned from an announced retirement, or have yet to make their ONE debut, or have get a contract from ONE Lumpinee (ONE Friday Fights) and The Inner Circle event.

Date	ISO	Name	Nickname	Sport	Division	Status / next fight / info	Ref	Record
June 5, 2026	(Japan)	Taiga Orii	Black Samurai	MMA	Bantamweight			5–0
July 31, 2026	(Philippines)	Islay Erika Bomogao		Muay Thai	Women's Atomweight			6–0
October 2, 2026	(Russia)	Dzhamil Osmanov	Curly Ninja	Kickboxing	Bantamweight			9–0
November 6, 2026	(New Zealand)	Titus Proctor		Muay Thai	Lightweight			

== Current champions, weight classes and status ==
The ONE currently uses ten different weight classes and four sports combat. This list of champions is updated as of December 6, 2025, after ONE Fight Night 38.

WC	Min	Upper limit	G	Sports	Champion	Flag	Date won	Ref	Days held	Defenses	Next fight / info
ATW	None	115 lb 52.2 kg	M	Muay Thai	Nadaka Yoshinari	Japan	Nov 16, 2025		371		
ATW	None	115 lb 52.2 kg	W	MMA	Denice Zamboanga	Philippines	May 2, 2025		569		
ATW	None	115 lb 52.2 kg	W	Kickboxing	Phetjeeja Lukjaoporongtom	Thailand	March 9, 2024		988	1. def. Kana Morimoto at ONE 172 on March 23, 2025	
ATW	None	115 lb 52.2 kg	W	Muay Thai	Allycia Rodrigues	Brazil	August 28, 2020		2277	1. def. interim champion Janet Todd at ONE Fight Night 8 on March 25, 2023; 2. def. Cristina Morales at ONE Fight Night 20 on March 9, 2024; 3. def. Marie McManamon at ONE Fight Night 29 on March 8, 2025; 4. def. Johanna Persson at ONE Fight Night 33 on July 12, 2025	
SW	>115 lb >52.2 kg	125 lb 56.7 kg	M	MMA	Joshua Pacio	(Philippines)	March 1, 2024		996	1. def. interim champion Jarred Brooks at ONE 171 on February 20, 2025; 2. def. Mansur Malachiev at ONE: The Inner Circle 21 on July 10, 2026	
SW	>115 lb >52.2 kg	125 lb 56.7 kg	M	Kickboxing	Jonathan Di Bella	(Italy)	October 4, 2025		414		
SW	>115 lb >52.2 kg	125 lb 56.7 kg	M	Muay Thai	Prajanchai P.K.Saenchai	(Thailand)	December 22, 2023		1066	1. def. Ellis Badr Barboza at ONE Fight Night 28 on February 8, 2025	
SW	>115 lb >52.2 kg	125 lb 56.7 kg	W	Muay Thai	Stella Hemetsberger	Austria	September 6, 2025		442		
SW	>115 lb >52.2 kg	125 lb 56.7 kg	W	Kickboxing	Stella Hemetsberger	Austria	February 14, 2026		281		
FLW	>125 lb >56.7 kg	135 lb 61.2 kg	M	MMA	Avazbek Kholmirzaev	Uzbekistan	Apr 29, 2026		207		
FLW	>125 lb >56.7 kg	135 lb 61.2 kg	M	Kickboxing	Superlek Kiatmuu9	Thailand	January 14, 2023		1408	1. def. Danial Williams at ONE Fight Night 8 on March 25, 2023; 2. def. Takeru Segawa at ONE 165 on January 28, 2024	
FLW	>125 lb >56.7 kg	135 lb 61.2 kg	M	Muay Thai	Asadula Imangazaliev	Russian Federation	June 26, 2026		149		
BW	>135 lb >61.2 kg	145 lb 65.8 kg	M	MMA	Enkh-Orgil Baatarkhuu	Mongolia	December 6, 2025		351		
BW	>135 lb >61.2 kg	145 lb 65.8 kg	M	Kickboxing	Jonathan Haggerty	England	November 4, 2023		1114	1. def. Wei Rui at ONE 171 on February 20, 2025; 2. def. Yuki Yoza at ONE Samurai 1 on April 29, 2026	
BW	>135 lb >61.2 kg	145 lb 65.8 kg	M	Muay Thai	Rambolek Chor.Ajalaboon	Thailand	Mar 20, 2026		247		
FW	>145 lb >65.8 kg	155 lb 70.3 kg	M	MMA	Tang Kai	China	August 26, 2022		1549	1. def. interim champion Thanh Le at ONE 166 on March 1, 2024	
FW	>145 lb >65.8 kg	155 lb 70.3 kg	M	Kickboxing	Superbon Singha Mawynn	Thailand	January 6, 2025		685	1. def. interim champion Masaaki Noiri at ONE 173 on Nov 16, 2025	
FW	>145 lb >65.8 kg	155 lb 70.3 kg	M	Muay Thai	Tawanchai P.K.Saenchai	Thailand	September 29, 2022		1515	1. def. Jamal Yusupov at ONE Fight Night 7 on February 25, 2023; 2. def. Superbon Singha Mawynn at ONE Friday Fights 46 on December 22, 2023; 3. def. Jo Nattawut at ONE 167 on June 8, 2024; 4. def. Superbon Singha Mawynn at ONE 170 on January 24, 2025	
LW	>155 lb >70.3 kg	170 lb 77.1 kg	M	MMA	Tye Ruotolo	United States	November 6, 2026		16		
LW	>155 lb >70.3 kg	170 lb 77.1 kg	M	Kickboxing	Regian Eersel	(Suriname)	April 10, 2026		226		
LW	>155 lb >70.3 kg	170 lb 77.1 kg	M	Muay Thai	Regian Eersel	(Suriname)	October 22, 2022		1492	1. def. Sinsamut Klinmee at ONE Friday Fights 9 on March 17, 2023; 2. def. Dmitry Menshikov at ONE Fight Night 11 on June 10, 2022; 3. def. George Jarvis at ONE Fight Night 34 on August 2, 2025	
LW	>155 lb >70.3 kg	170 lb 77.1 kg	M	Submission Grappling	Kade Ruotolo	United States	October 22, 2022		1492	1. def. Matheus Gabriel at ONE on Prime Video 5 on December 3, 2022; 2. def. Tommy Langaker at ONE Fight Night 11 on June 10, 2023; 3. def. Tommy Langaker at ONE 165 on January 28, 2024	
WW	>170 lb >77.1 kg	185 lb 83.9 kg	M	MMA	Christian Lee	Singapore United States	November 19, 2022		1464		
WW	>170 lb >77.1 kg	185 lb 83.9 kg	M	Submission grappling	Tye Ruotolo	United States	November 4, 2023		1114	1. def. Izaak Michell at ONE Fight Night 21 on April 6, 2024; 2. def. Dante Leon at ONE Fight Night 31 on May 3, 2025; 3. def. Paweł Jaworski at ONE Fight Night 41 on Mar 14, 2026	
LHW	>205 lb >93 kg	225 lb 102.1 kg	M	MMA	Anatoly Malykhin	Russian Federation	December 3 2022		1450		
LHW	>205 lb >93 kg	225 lb 102.1 kg	M	Kickboxing	Roman Kryklia	Ukraine	November 16, 2019		2563	1. def. Andrei Stoica at ONE: Collision Course on December 18, 2020; 2. def. Murat Aygün at ONE: Full Circle on February 25, 2022	
HW	>225 lb >102.1 kg	265 lb 120.2 kg	M	MMA							
HW	>225 lb >102.1 kg	265 lb 120.2 kg	M	Kickboxing	Roman Kryklia	(Ukraine)	June 19, 2026		156		
HW	>225 lb >102.1 kg	265 lb 120.2 kg	M	Muay Thai	Roman Kryklia	Ukraine	December 9, 2023		1079	1. def. Lyndon Knowles at ONE Fight Night 30 on April 5, 2025	

== Suspended fighters ==
The list below is based on fighters suspended either by World Anti-Doping Agency (WADA) for violation of taking prohibited substances or non-analytical incidents, (2) by local commissions on misconduct during the fights or at event venues, or (3) by ONE.

ISO	Name	Nickname	Division	From	Duration	Tested positive for / Info	By	Eligible to fight again	Ref.	Notes
(Brazil)	Francisco Lo		Welterweight	April 28, 2025	3 years	Dehydrochloromethyltestosterone and 19-norandrosterone	USADA	April 28, 2028		

== Mixed martial arts ==
=== Heavyweight (265 lb, 120.2 kg) ===
	Name	Age	Ht.	Nickname	Result / next fight / status	MMA record	ONE Championship record	Year of last ONE fight
Turkey	Shamil Erdogan	36	6 ft 2 in (1.88 m)		Win - ONE Fight Night 48 (Bangkok) - Paul Elliott	14–0	6–0	2026
England	Paul Elliott	34	6 ft 1 in (1.85 m)		Loss - ONE Fight Night 48 (Bangkok) - Shamil Erdogan	8–3 (1)	2–3 (1)	2026
Japan	Ryugo Takeuchi	23	6 ft 1 in (1.85 m)	Rising Rock Star	Loss - ONE Fight Night 40 (Bangkok) - Ben Tynan	5–3	1–3	2026
Canada	Ben Tynan	32	6 ft 3 in (1.91 m)	Vanilla Thunder	Win - ONE Fight Night 40 (Bangkok) - Ryugo Takeuchi	6–1 (1)	2–1 (1)	2026
United States	Regan Upshaw	29	6 ft 0 in (1.83 m)		Loss - ONE Fight Night 44 (Bangkok) - Paul Elliott	0–1	0–1	2026

=== Welterweight (185 lb, 83.9 kg) ===
	Name	Age	Ht.	Nickname	Result / next fight / status	MMA record	ONE Championship record	Year of last ONE fight
United States	Christian Lee (C)	28	5 ft 10 in (1.78 m)	The Warrior		18–4 (1)	18–4 (1)	2025
Turkey	Saygid Guseyn Arslanaliev	32	6 ft 2 in (1.88 m)	Dagi		9–3	8–3	2025
(Turkey)	Dzhabir Dzhabrailov	21	6 ft 2 in (1.88 m)		ONE Fight Night 50 (Bangkok) - Maurice Abévi	7–0	4–0	2026
(Switzerland)	Maurice Abévi	27	6 ft 0 in (1.83 m)		ONE Fight Night 50 (Bangkok) - Dzhabir Dzhabrailov	9–1	3–1	2025
Australia	Isi Fitikefu	34	5 ft 10 in (1.78 m)	Doxz	Loss - ONE Fight Night 39 (Bangkok) - Chase Mann	9–2	2–2	2026
(United States)	Chase Mann	30	5 ft 9 in (1.75 m)	Mannimal	Loss - ONE Fight Night 42 (Bangkok) - Dzhabir Dzhabrailov	8–1	1–1	2026

=== Lightweight (170 lb, 77.1 kg) ===
	Name	Age	Ht.	Nickname	Result / next fight / status	MMA record	ONE Championship record	Year of last ONE fight
United States	Tye Ruotolo (C)	23	5 ft 10 in (1.78 m)		Win - The Inner Circle 37 (Bangkok) - Christian Lee	3–0	3–0	2026
United States	Christian Lee	28	5 ft 10 in (1.78 m)	The Warrior	Loss - The Inner Circle 37 (Bangkok) - Tye Ruotolo	18–5 (1)	18–5 (1)	2026
(Philippines)	Eduard Folayang	42	5 ft 9 in (1.75 m)	Landslide	Loss - The Inner Circle 21 (Bangkok) - Shozo Isojima	23–15	13–13	2026
Japan	Hiroyuki Tetsuka	36	5 ft 6 in (1.68 m)	Japanese Beast	Loss - The Inner Circle 14 (Bangkok) - Kade Ruotolo	15–7	7–4	2026
(South Korea)	Ok Rae-Yoon	35	6 ft 0 in (1.83 m)		ONE Fight Night 50 (Bangkok) - Kade Ruotolo	17–6	4–3	2026
China	Zhang Lipeng	36	5 ft 11 in (1.80 m)	The Warrior		35–13–2 (1)	4–2 (1)	2025
(Brazil)	Lucas Gabriel	26	5 ft 8 in (1.73 m)	Sinister	Loss - ONE Fight Night 49 (Bangkok) - Magomed Magomedov	11–2 (1)	5–1 (1)	2026
(United States)	Adrian Lee	20	5 ft 11 in (1.80 m)	The Phenom	Win - ONE Fight Night 40 (Bangkok) - Shozo Isojima	4–1	4–1	2026
United States	Kade Ruotolo	23	5 ft 11 in (1.80 m)		ONE Fight Night 50 (Bangkok) - Ok Rae-yoon	4–0	4–0	2026
(Japan)	Shozo Isojima	29	5 ft 10 in (1.78 m)	Great Teacher	Loss - ONE Samurai 4 (Tokyo) - Kota Abe	7–3	2–3	2026
Japan	Kouta Abe	28	5 ft 6 in (1.68 m)		Win - ONE Samurai 4 (Tokyo) - Shozo Isojima	7–1	2–0	2026
(Turkey)	Alibeg Rasulov	33	5 ft 7 in (1.70 m)		(Oct 22) - injury - out of ONE Fight Night 49 (Bangkok) - Lucas Gabriel	14–1 (1)	1–1 (1)	2025
(Bahrain)	Magomed Magomedov	31	5 ft 9 in (1.75 m)	Muhammad	Win - ONE Fight Night 49 (Bangkok) - Lucas Gabriel	16–0	1–0	2026

=== Featherweight (155 lb, 70.3 kg) ===
	Name	Age	Ht.	Nickname	Result / next fight / status	MMA record	ONE Championship record	Year of last ONE fight
China	Tang Kai (C)	30	5 ft 10 in (1.78 m)		ONE 174 (Shanghai) - Enkh-Orgil Baatarkhuu	20–4	9–1	2026
Russia	Shamil Gasanov	31	5 ft 7 in (1.70 m)	The Cobra	Loss - ONE Fight Night 43 (Bangkok) - Tang Kai	14–2	6–2	2026
(Brazil)	João Pedro Dantas	23	5 ft 10 in (1.78 m)	Guerreirinho	Win - ONE Fight Night 47 (Bangkok) - Hector Almonacid	7–1	1–1	2026

=== Bantamweight (145 lb, 65.8 kg) ===
	Name	Age	Ht.	Nickname	Result / next fight / status	MMA record	ONE Championship record	Year of last ONE fight
(Azerbaijan)	Elbek Alyshov (C)	27	5 ft 6 in (1.68 m)		Win - The Inner Circle 24 (Bangkok) - Enkh-Orgil Baatarkhuu	11–0	3–0	2026
Mongolia	Enkh-Orgil Baatarkhuu	37	5 ft 6 in (1.68 m)	The Tormentor	ONE 174 (Shanghai) - Tang Kai	14–4	7–2	2026
Philippines	Carlo Bumina-ang	32	5 ft 5 in (1.65 m)	The Bull	Win - The Inner Circle 11 (Bangkok) - Batochir Batsaikhan	10–2	9–2	2026
Brazil	Fabrício Andrade	29	5 ft 7 in (1.70 m)	Wonder Boy		10–3 (1)	7–1 (1)	2025
Philippines	Jeremy Pacatiw	30	5 ft 5 in (1.65 m)	The Juggernaut		13–7	3–3	2025
(Philippines)	Jhanlo Mark Sangiao	24	5 ft 6 in (1.68 m)	The Machine	Loss - ONE Fight Night 46 (Bangkok) - Marcos Aurélio	7–2	4–2	2026
(Brazil)	Marcos Aurélio	22	5 ft 8 in (1.73 m)	Peruano	Win - ONE Fight Night 46 (Bangkok) - Jhanlo Mark Sangiao	10–1	2–1	2026
(Tajikistan)	Kalandar Tabarov	27	5 ft 8 in (1.73 m)		Loss - ONE Fight Night 49 (Bangkok) - Ilmadi Israilov	5–1	0–1	2026
(Russia)	Ilmadi Israilov	23	5 ft 8 in (1.73 m)	Cowboy	Win - ONE Fight Night 49 (Bangkok) - Kalandar Tabarov	10–0	1–0	2026

=== Flyweight (135 lb, 61.2 kg) ===
	Name	Age	Ht.	Nickname	Result / next fight / status	MMA record	ONE Championship record	Year of last ONE fight
Uzbekistan	Avazbek Kholmirzaev (C)	25	5 ft 9 in (1.75 m)	Ninzya	Win - ONE Samurai 1 (Tokyo) - Yuya Wakamatsu	16–2	10–1	2026
Japan	Yuya Wakamatsu	31	5 ft 6 in (1.68 m)	Little Piranha	Win - ONE Samurai 3 (Yokohama) - Willie van Rooyen	21–7	11–5	2026
Philippines	Lito Adiwang	33	5 ft 4 in (1.63 m)	Thunder Kid	Loss - ONE Fight Night 45 (Bangkok) - Antonio Cesar	18–7	9–5	2026
Japan	Tatsumitsu Wada	38	5 ft 7 in (1.70 m)	The Sweeper	Win - ONE Samurai 1 (Tokyo) - Seiichiro Ito	27–14–2	7–7	2026
United States	Jarred Brooks	33	5 ft 3 in (1.60 m)	The Monkey God		21–6 (1)	5–4	2025
(Vietnam)	Viet Anh Do	29	5 ft 4 in (1.63 m)		Win - ONE Fight Night 46 (Bangkok) - Davi Brandao	7–0 (1)	6–0	2026
China	Hu Yong	30	5 ft 6 in (1.68 m)	Wolf Warrior	Win - ONE Fight Night 40 (Bangkok) - Danny Kingad	13–6	5–3	2026
(United States)	Gilbert Nakatani	33	5 ft 5 in (1.65 m)		(Sep 3) - Lalthazuala missed weight - out of ONE Fight Night 47 (Bangkok) - Nazareth Lalinazuala	9–4	1–3	2026
Qatar	Ruslan Satiev	27	5 ft 6 in (1.68 m)		Win - ONE Fight Night 45 (Bangkok) - Sanzhar Zakirov	7–0	2–0	2026
Brazil	Antonio Cesar	22	5 ft 9 in (1.75 m)	The Flash	Win - ONE Fight Night 48 (Bangkok) - Joshua Pereira	15–2	2–0	2026
(South Africa)	Willie van Rooyen	24	5 ft 7 in (1.70 m)	White Lion	Loss - ONE Samurai 3 (Yokohama) - Yuya Wakamatsu	8–2	1–2	2026
Japan	Ryoto Nishiyama	26	5 ft 6 in (1.68 m)		Win - ONE Samurai 4 (Tokyo) - Yu Takeuchi	6–2	2–0	2026
United States	Joshua Pereira	29	5 ft 7 in (1.70 m)	Flyin Hawaiian	Loss - ONE Fight Night 48 (Bangkok) - Antonio Cesar	6–1 (1)	1–1 (1)	2026
(Brazil)	Davi Brandão	21	5 ft 5 in (1.65 m)	Ajuricaba	Loss - ONE Fight Night 46 (Bangkok) - Viet Anh Do	6–1	0–1	2026

=== Strawweight (125 lb, 56.7 kg) ===
	Name	Age	Ht.	Nickname	Result / next fight / status	MMA record	ONE Championship record	Year of last ONE fight
Philippines	Joshua Pacio (C)	30	5 ft 4 in (1.63 m)	The Passion	ONE Samurai 5 (Tokyo) - Keito Yamakita	24–5	16–5	2026
South Africa	Bokang Masunyane	32	5 ft 1 in (1.55 m)	Little Giant	Loss - ONE Fight Night 45 (Bangkok) - Lee Seung-chul	10–4	4–4	2026
Japan	Hiroba Minowa	27	5 ft 3 in (1.60 m)		Win - ONE Samurai 3 (Yokohama) - Yuta Miyazawa	16–6	5–4	2026
(South Korea)	Lee Seung-chul	27	5 ft 4 in (1.63 m)	The Flash	Win - ONE Fight Night 49 (Bangkok) - Nazareth Lalthazuala	14–1	7–0	2026
Japan	Keito Yamakita	30	5 ft 1 in (1.55 m)	Pocket Monk	ONE Samurai 5 (Tokyo) - Joshua Pacio	13–1	6–1	2026
Russian Federation	Mansur Malachiev	35	5 ft 6 in (1.68 m)		Loss - The Inner Circle 21 (Bangkok) - Joshua Pacio	14–2	4–2	2026
Japan	Ryohei Kurosawa	33	5 ft 4 in (1.63 m)	Ken Asuka	Loss - ONE Fight Night 47 (Bangkok) - Fabio Henrique	20–7	1–3	2026
(Brazil)	Fabio Henrique	34	5 ft 2 in (1.57 m)	The Giant	Win - ONE Fight Night 47 (Bangkok) - Ryohei Kurosawa	16–1	2–1	2026
Armenia	Karen Ghazaryan	25	5 ft 3 in (1.60 m)			6–1	1–1	2026
Japan	Seiichiro Ito	32	5 ft 4 in (1.63 m)		Win - ONE Samurai 3 (Yokohama) - Kazusa Kurobe	19–5–2	1–1	2026
Japan	Hisashi Ezaki	38	5 ft 5 in (1.65 m)		Loss - ONE Fight Night 44 (Bangkok) - Karen Ghazaryan	7–1	0–1	2026
(India)	Nazareth Lalthazuala	25	5 ft 5 in (1.65 m)	The Northstar	Loss - ONE Fight Night 49 (Bangkok) - Lee Seung-chul	8–1	3–1	2026

=== Women's Atomweight (115 lb, 52.2 kg) ===
	Name	Age	Ht.	Nickname	Result / next fight / status	MMA record	ONE Championship record	Year of last ONE fight
Philippines	Denice Zamboanga	29	5 ft 2 in (1.57 m)	The Menace		12–2	7–2	2025
Malaysia	Jihin Radzuan	28	5 ft 2 in (1.57 m)	Shadow Cat	Loss - ONE Samurai 4 (Tokyo) - Itsuki Hirata	10–5	9–5	2026
Japan	Ayaka Miura	36	5 ft 1 in (1.55 m)	Zombie	Loss - ONE Fight Night 45 (Bangkok) - Victória Souza	16–7 (1)	9–5	2026
Thailand	Stamp Fairtex	29	5 ft 2 in (1.57 m)		The Inner Circle 20 (Bangkok) - Cynthia Flores (Muay Thai bout)	11–2	11–2	2023
Japan	Itsuki Hirata	27	5 ft 2 in (1.57 m)	Android 18	Win - ONE Samurai 4 (Tokyo) - Jihin Radzuan	9–5	8–5	2026
Japan	Chihiro Sawada	28	4 ft 11 in (1.50 m)		ONE Samurai 6 (Yokohama) - Anastasia Nikolakakos	12–1–1	7–1	2026
(Brazil)	Victória Souza	29	5 ft 0 in (1.52 m)	Vick	Loss - ONE Fight Night 49 (Bangkok) - Magdalena Czaban	10–4	4–4	2026
(Canada)	Anastasia Nikolakakos	37	5 ft 0 in (1.52 m)	Anniemale	ONE Samurai 6 (Yokohama) - Chihiro Sawada	7–0	2–0	2026
(United States)	Natalie Salcedo	34	5 ft 0 in (1.52 m)		Loss - ONE Fight Night 46 (Bangkok) - Magdalena Czaban	4–2	1–2	2026
(Poland)	Magdalena Czaban	27	5 ft 1 in (1.55 m)	The Powerpuff Girl	Win - ONE Fight Night 49 (Bangkok) - Victória Souza	6–0	2–0	2026
(Brazil)	Gabriela Fujimoto	23	5 ft 4 in (1.63 m)	Gabi	Loss - ONE Fight Night 47 (Bangkok) - Macarena Aragon	7–2	0–2	2026

Unless otherwise cited, all records are retrieved from tapology.com

.

(C)	Indicates the current champion

== Kickboxing & Muay Thai ==
=== Heavyweight (265 lb, 120.2 kg) ===
	Name	Age	Ht.	Nickname	Result / next fight / status	MT/KB record	ONE record	Year of last ONE fight
Ukraine	Roman Kryklia (MT.C), (KB.C)	34	6 ft 7 in (2.01 m)		Win - The Inner Circle 19 (Bangkok) - Samet Agdeve	51–8	8–1	2026
Turkey	Samet Agdeve	22	1.90 m (6 ft 3 in)	The King	Loss - The Inner Circle 19 (Bangkok) - Roman Kryklia	18–1	1–1	2026
England	Lyndon Knowles	40	6 ft 0 in (1.83 m)	Knowlesy		77–17	0–1	2025

=== Light Heavyweight (225 lb, 102.1 kg) ===
	Name	Age	Ht.	Nickname	Result / next fight / status	MT/KB record	ONE record	Year of last ONE fight
Ukraine	Roman Kryklia (KB.C)	34	6 ft 7 in (2.01 m)			51–8	8–1	2026

=== Lightweight (170 lb, 77.1 kg) ===
	Name	Age	Ht.	Nickname	Result / next fight / status	MT/KB record	ONE record	Year of last ONE fight
Suriname	Regian Eersel (MT.C), (KB.C)	33	6 ft 2 in (1.88 m)	The Immortal	Win - The Inner Circle 33 (Bangkok) - George Jarvis	66–5	15–1	2026
(Thailand)	Sinsamut Klinmee	31	6 ft 0 in (1.83 m)	Aquaman	Win - ONE Samurai 4 (Tokyo) - Shintaro Matsukura	84–22–3	6–6	2026
Thailand	Rungrawee Sitsongpeenong	30	5 ft 11 in (1.80 m)	Legatron	Loss - ONE Fight Night 44 (Bangkok) - George Jarvis	158–50–2	6–4	2026
(England)	George Jarvis	26	6 ft 0 in (1.83 m)	G-Unit	Loss - The Inner Circle 33 (Bangkok) - Regian Eersel	29–6	6–3	2026
(Bulgaria)	Bogdan Shumarov	30	5 ft 11 in (1.80 m)		Win - ONE Fight Night 49 (Bangkok) - Gasham Mammadov	19–4–1	4–1	2025
Spain	Nauzet Trujillo	36	5 ft 11 in (1.80 m)			49–12–1	1–2	2025
(Denmark)	Youssef Assouik	31	6 ft 3 in (1.91 m)			28–4	1–1	2025
(Iran)	Abolfazl Alipourandi	30	5 ft 10 in (1.78 m)	White Wolf		16–6	1–1	2025

=== Featherweight (155 lb, 70.3 kg) ===
	Name	Age	Ht.	Nickname	Result / next fight / status	MT/KB record	ONE record	Year of last ONE fight
Scotland	Nico Carrillo (MT.C)	28	5 ft 10 in (1.78 m)	King of the North	The Inner Circle 43 (Bangkok) - Nabil Anane	31–4–1	8–1	2026
(Thailand)	Superbon Singha Mawynn (KB.C)	36	5 ft 10 in (1.78 m)		(May 6) - injury - out of ONE Friday Fights 155 (Bangkok) - Liu Mengyang	117–37	7–3	2025
(Thailand)	Tawanchai P.K.Saenchai	27	5 ft 11 in (1.80 m)			134–33–2	10–3	2025
(Thailand)	Jo Nattawut	37	5 ft 10 in (1.78 m)	Smokin'Jo		72–15–2	6–9	2025
(Iran)	Mohammad Siasarani	24	5 ft 10 in (1.78 m)		ONE Samurai 6 (Yokohama) - Hiromi Wajima	28–13	10–2	2026
(Thailand)	Shadow Singha Mawynn	26	5 ft 10 in (1.78 m)		Loss - ONE Fight Night 40 (Bangkok) - Nico Carrillo	83–25–1 (1)	6–3 (1)	2026
Armenia	Marat Grigorian	35	5 ft 9 in (1.75 m)		(Oct 16) - bout canceled ONE Samurai 4 (Tokyo) - Luo Chao	71–14–1 (1)	7–3	2026
Thailand	Nonthachai Jitmuangnon	27	5 ft 11 in (1.80 m)		Win - ONE Fight Night 49 (Bangkok) - Felipe Lobo	54–23	7–2	2026
(Argentina)	Ricardo Bravo	26	5 ft 11 in (1.80 m)	Argentinian Samurai	ONE Fight Night 50 (Bangkok) - Bampara Kouyate	28–6–2	4–3	2026
Japan	Masaaki Noiri	33	5 ft 9 in (1.75 m)		Win - ONE Samurai 4 (Tokyo) - Mohammad Siasarani	53–14	4–3	2026
(United States)	Luke Lissei	30	6 ft 1 in (1.85 m)	The Chef	Win - ONE Fight Night 48 (Bangkok) - Charlie Guest	10–3	4–3	2026
(Algeria)	Mohamed Younes Rabah	29	6 ft 2 in (1.88 m)	The Buraq	Loss - ONE Fight Night 47 (Bangkok) - Ricardo Bravo	15–3 (1)	2–3 (1)	2026
France	Bampara Kouyate	31	6 ft 2 in (1.88 m)	Bambi Firelek	ONE Fight Night 50 (Bangkok) - Ricardo Bravo	36–3	2–2	2025
(United States)	Arian Esparza	23	5 ft 9 in (1.75 m)	The Destroyer	Win - ONE Fight Night 48 (Bangkok) - Sam Fitzgerald	22–3	2–2	2026
Iraq	Shakir Al-Tekreeti	29	6 ft 1 in (1.85 m)			22–8	1–2	2025
(Japan)	Hiromi Wajima	31	5 ft 11 in (1.80 m)	The Purple Comet	ONE Samurai 6 (Yokohama) - Mohammad Siasarani	23–7	1–1	2026
(Japan)	Kaito Ono	29	5 ft 11 in (1.80 m)		Loss - ONE Samurai 2 (Tokyo) - Mohammad Siasarani	59–12 (1)	0–3	2026
(New Zealand)	Sam Fitzgerald	21	6 ft 3 in (1.91 m)		Loss - ONE Fight Night 48 (Bangkok) - Arian Esparza	15–4	0–2	2026
(Japan)	Rukiya Anpo	31	6 ft 0 in (1.83 m)	Demolition Man	(Oct 16) - bout canceled ONE Samurai 4 (Tokyo) - Bogdan Shumarov	27–9–1	0–1	2025
(England)	Charlie Guest	30	6 ft 0 in (1.83 m)		Loss - ONE Fight Night 48 (Bangkok) - Luke Lessei		1–1	2026

=== Bantamweight (145 lb, 65.8 kg) ===
	Name	Age	Ht.	Nickname	Result / next fight / status	MT/KB record	ONE record	Year of last ONE fight
(England)	Jonathan Haggerty (KB.C)	29	5 ft 7 in (1.70 m)	The General	Win - ONE Samurai 4 (Tokyo) - Hiroki Akimoto	25–5	11–3	2026
(Thailand)	Yod-IQ Or.Pimolsri (MT.C)	24	5 ft 10 in (1.78 m)		Win - The Inner Circle 30 (Bangkok) - Rambolek Chor.Ajalaboon	128–36–15	13–1	2026
(Thailand)	Rambolek Chor.Ajalaboon	23	5 ft 8 in (1.73 m)		Loss - The Inner Circle 30 (Bangkok) - Yod-IQ Or.Pimolsri	68–16–3	8–3	2026
(Algeria)	Nabil Anane	22	6 ft 4 in (1.93 m)		The Inner Circle 43 (Bangkok) - Nico Carrillo	42–7–1 (1)	8–3 (1)	2026
(Thailand)	Saemapetch Fairtex	32	5 ft 8 in (1.73 m)			127–24–1	9–9	2025
(Thailand)	Ratchasiesan Laochokcharoen	28	5 ft 6 in (1.68 m)	Left Meteorite	Loss - The Inner Circle 12 (Bangkok) - Elbrus Osmanov	82–29–2 (1)	12–7 (1)	2026
(Russia)	Alaverdi Ramazanov	31	5 ft 11 in (1.80 m)	Babyface Killer		65–12	8–7	2025
(Japan)	Hiroki Akimoto	34	5 ft 7 in (1.70 m)		Loss - ONE Samurai 4 (Tokyo) - Jonathan Haggerty	29–4	9–4	2026
(Russia)	Abdulla Dayakaev	24	5 ft 10 in (1.78 m)	Smash Boy	Win - The Inner Circle 25 (Bangkok) - Superlek Kiatmuu9	24–3	10–2	2026
(Russia)	Elbrus Osmanov	25	5 ft 8 in (1.73 m)	Samurai	Win - ONE Fight Night 48 (Bangkok) - Yi Yuxuan	16–1	10–1	2026
(Thailand)	Suakim Sor.Jor.Tongprajin	31	5 ft 9 in (1.75 m)		Win - The Inner Circle 25 (Bangkok) - Nabil Anane	156–60–3	9–2	2026
Thailand	Ferrari Fairtex	29	5 ft 9 in (1.75 m)		ONE Fight Night 50 (Bangkok) - Denis Souza Jr.	139–33–4 (1)	7–4 (1)	2026
(Iran)	Parham Gheirati	22	5 ft 10 in (1.78 m)		Win - ONE Fight Night 48 (Bangkok) - Nakrob Fairtex	17–6	8–1	2026
(Brazil)	Felipe Lobo	33	5 ft 9 in (1.75 m)	Demolition Man	Loss - ONE Fight Night 49 (Bangkok) - Nonthachai Jitmuangnon	23–14	4–5	2026
(Russia)	Vladimir Kuzmin	28	5 ft 9 in (1.75 m)		Loss - ONE Fight Night 42 (Bangkok) - Suakim Sor.Jor.Tongprajin	23–5	5–4	2026
Russian Federation	Alexey Balyko	33	5 ft 7 in (1.70 m)		Loss - The Inner Circle 31 (Bangkok) - Yamin P.K.Saenchai	23–16–1	3–6	2026
(Japan)	Yuki Yoza	28	5 ft 6 in (1.68 m)		Loss - ONE Samurai 4 (Tokyo) - Nabil Anane	22–4	4–2	2026
Russian Federation	Dmitrii Kovtun	29	5 ft 10 in (1.78 m)	The Silent Assassin	Loss - ONE Fight Night 46 (Bangkok) - Denis Souza Jr.		6–3	2026
(Myanmar)	Soe Lin Oo	34	5 ft 7 in (1.70 m)	Man of Steel	Loss - ONE Friday Fights 139 (Bangkok) - Worapon Lukjaoporongtom	74–7–52	3–4	2026
(Netherlands)	Ilias Ennahachi	30	5 ft 10 in (1.78 m)	Tweety		40–3 (1)	5–0 (1)	2025
(United States)	Asa Ten Pow	37	5 ft 9 in (1.75 m)	The American Ninja		14–4	3–2	2025
(Thailand)	Petchtanong Petchfergus	41	5 ft 9 in (1.75 m)		Loss - ONE Samurai 5 (Tokyo) - Yutaro Asahi	360–58–1	4–3	2026
(Russia)	Kiamran Nabati	31	5 ft 9 in (1.75 m)		Win - The Inner Circle 31 (Bangkok) - Nonthachai Jitmuangnon	23–1 (1)	5–1 (1)	2026
(Japan)	Shinji Suzuki	41	5 ft 9 in (1.75 m)		Loss - ONE Fight Night 44 (Bangkok) - Ferrari Fairtex		1–4	2026
Japan	Katsuki Kitano	30	5 ft 10 in (1.78 m)		(Oct 22) - injury - out of ONE Fight Night 49 (Bangkok) - Felipe Lobo	26–12	2–2	2026
(England)	Ben Woolliss	32	5 ft 8 in (1.73 m)	The Problem	Loss - The Inner Circle 33 (Bangkok) - Dzhamil Osmanov	30–9	1–3	2026
(Japan)	Ranma	22	5 ft 9 in (1.75 m)		Win - The Inner Circle 36 (Bangkok) - Evan Gambuto	10–3–1	4–1	2026
Brazil	Denis Souza Jr.	28	5 ft 9 in (1.75 m)	Denizinho	ONE Fight Night 50 (Bangkok) - Ferrari Fairtex	17–2	1–1	2026
(Japan)	Taimu Hisai	21	5 ft 7 in (1.70 m)		Loss - ONE Samurai 1 (Tokyo) - Hiroki Akimoto	19–7–1	1–1	2026
(China)	Yi Yuxuan	25	5 ft 10 in (1.78 m)	Samurai	Loss - ONE Fight Night 48 (Bangkok) - Elbrus Osmanov	56–7–1	0–1	2026

=== Flyweight (135 lb, 61.2 kg) ===
	Name	Age	Ht.	Nickname	Result / next fight / status	MT/KB record	ONE record	Year of last ONE fight
(Thailand)	Superlek Kiatmuu9	31	5 ft 7 in (1.70 m)	The Kicking Machine	Loss - The Inner Circle 25 (Bangkok) - Abdulla Dayakaev	139–33–4	15–5	2026
(Russia)	Asadula Imangazaliev (MT.C)	23	5 ft 10 in (1.78 m)	The Dagestan Ninja	The Inner Circle 39 (Bangkok) - Aslamjon Ortikov	13–0	9–0	2026
(Thailand)	Rodtang Jitmuangnon	29	5 ft 6 in (1.68 m)	The Iron Man	Loss - The Inner Circle 38 (Bangkok) - Nong-O Hama	274–45–10	17–3	2026
(Thailand)	Nong-O Hama	40	5 ft 7 in (1.70 m)		Win - The Inner Circle 38 (Bangkok) - Rodtang Jitmuangnon	269–59–10	14–5	2026
(Thailand)	Kongthoranee Sor.Sommai	30	5 ft 7 in (1.70 m)		Loss - ONE Fight Night 49 (Bangkok) - Taiki Naito	73–21–1	12–7	2026
(Japan)	Taiki Naito	30	5 ft 7 in (1.70 m)	Silent Sniper	Win - ONE Fight Night 49 (Bangkok) - Kongthoranee Sor.Sommai	40–13	11–6	2026
(Thailand)	Yodlekpet Or.Atchariya	31	5 ft 4 in (1.63 m)	The Destroyer	(Nov 11) illness - out of ONE Friday Fights 178 (Bangkok) - Kyaw Swar Win	95–40	11–7	2026
(Thailand)	Muangthai P.K.Saenchai	32	5 ft 7 in (1.70 m)	Elbow Zombie	Win - The Inner Circle 30 (Bangkok) - Saeksan Or. Kwanmuang	208–48–4	10–6	2026
(Thailand)	Suriyanlek Por.Yenying	30	5 ft 3 in (1.60 m)		Loss - The Inner Circle 34 (Bangkok) - Rustam Yunusov	86–33	11–8	2026
(Thailand)	Suablack Tor.Pran49	30	5 ft 7 in (1.70 m)		ONE Fight Night 50 (Bangkok) - Jhordan Estupiñan	63–24	9–6	2026
(Thailand)	Jaosuayai Mor.Krungthepthonburi	25	5 ft 5 in (1.65 m)		Loss - ONE Fight Night 47 (Bangkok) - Jhordan Estupiñan	83–44–2	8–7	2026
(Thailand)	Nakrob Fairtex	28	5 ft 9 in (1.75 m)		Loss - ONE Fight Night 48 (Bangkok) - Parham Gheirati	69–26	8–6	2026
Thailand	Dedduanglek Torfunfarm	23	5 ft 9 in (1.75 m)		Win - ONE Friday Fights 174 (Bangkok) - Mongkoldetlek Por.Pim-on	60–15	10–6	2026
Malaysia	Johan Ghazali	20	5 ft 6 in (1.68 m)	Jojo	The Inner Circle 42 (Bangkok) - Johan Estupiñan	28–11	9–5	2026
Thailand	Panpayak Jitmuangnon	30	5 ft 8 in (1.73 m)	The Angel Warrior	The Inner Circle 41 (Bangkok) - Lamnamoonlek Or.Atchariya	252–45–3	8–5	2026
(Uzbekistan)	Aslamjon Ortikov	23	5 ft 9 in (1.75 m)	El Pantera	The Inner Circle 39 (Bangkok) - Asadula Imangazaliev	24–1	10–1	2026
(Scotland)	Stephen Irvine	26	5 ft 7 in (1.70 m)	El Matador	Loss - ONE Fight Night 45 (Bangkok) - Suablack Tor.Pran49	30–5	7–2	2026
(Colombia)	Johan Estupiñan	24	5 ft 9 in (1.75 m)	Panda Kick	The Inner Circle 42 (Bangkok) - Johan Ghazali	28–2	6–2	2026
(Myanmar)	Thant Zin	22	5 ft 7 in (1.70 m)		Loss - The Inner Circle 9 (Bangkok) - Jaradchai Maxjandee	26–15–3	2–5	2026
Thailand	Black Panther VenumMuayThai	26	5 ft 8 in (1.73 m)		Loss - The Inner Circle 39 (Bangkok) - Ubaid Hussain	82–18	6–2	2026
(Japan)	Hyu Iwata	24	5 ft 8 in (1.73 m)	Mister Pepper	Win - ONE Samurai 3 (Yokohama) - Hyuma Hitachi	14–1	6–1	2026
(Morocco)	Zakaria El Jamari	36	5 ft 4 in (1.63 m)			5–6	1–5	2025
(Japan)	Shimon Yoshinari	22	5 ft 10 in (1.78 m)		Win - ONE Friday Fights 178 (Bangkok) - Ramadan Ondash	27–1 (1)	7–0 (1)	2026
(Azerbaijan)	Akif Guluzada	21	5 ft 9 in (1.75 m)	King	(Sep 3) - missed weight - out of The Inner Circle 29 (Bangkok) - Ferrari Fairtex	20–3	5–1	2026
(England)	Freddie Haggerty	22	5 ft 7 in (1.70 m)		Win - The Inner Circle 30 (Bangkok) - Rungruanglek TN.Muaythai	25–5–1	5–1	2026
(Pakistan)	Ubaid Hussain	21	5 ft 8 in (1.73 m)	Bad	Win - The Inner Circle 39 (Bangkok) - Black Panther VenumMuayThai	18–0	9–0	2026
(Colombia)	Jhordan Estupiñan	24	5 ft 8 in (1.73 m)	Panda Kick	ONE Fight Night 50 (Bangkok) - Suablack Tor.Pran49	10–1	3–1	2026
(United States)	Diego Paez	32	5 ft 7 in (1.70 m)		Loss - The Inner Circle 35 (Bangkok) - Johan Ghazali	8–4–2	1–2	2026
(Japan)	Ryusei Kumagai	25	5 ft 8 in (1.73 m)	Notorious Tyrant		19–1	1–0	2025
(China)	Liao Shixu	20	5 ft 11 in (1.80 m)			16–7	0–1	2025

=== Strawweight (125 lb, 56.7 kg) ===
	Name	Age	Ht.	Nickname	Result / next fight / status	MT/KB record	ONE record	Year of last ONE fight
(Thailand)	Prajanchai P.K.Saenchai (MT.C)	32	5 ft 4 in (1.63 m)		The Inner Circle 43 (Bangkok) - Aliff Sor.Dechapan	344–53–3	7–2	2025
(Malaysia)	Aliff Sor.Dechapan (MT.IC)	23	5 ft 10 in (1.78 m)		The Inner Circle 43 (Bangkok) - Prajanchai P.K.Saenchai	63–9–2	10–2	2026
(Italy)	Jonathan Di Bella (KB.C)	30	5 ft 9 in (1.75 m)		ONE 174 (Shanghai) - Wang Junguang	16–1	6–1	2026
(Thailand)	Sam-A Gaiyanghadao	42	5 ft 6 in (1.68 m)		Loss - The Inner Circle 23 (Bangkok) - Aliff Sor.Dechapan	378–51–9	12–5	2026
(Portugal)	Rui Botelho	31	5 ft 7 in (1.70 m)				4–7	2025
Thailand	Thongpoon P.K.Saenchai	29	5 ft 4 in (1.63 m)		ONE Samurai 6 (Yokohama) - Ryuya Okuwaki	80–28–2 (1)	5–5 (1)	2026
(China)	Zhang Peimian	23	5 ft 4 in (1.63 m)	Fighting Rooster	Loss - The Inner Circle 22 (Bangkok) - Jonathan Di Bella	20–6–1	6–5	2026
(Brazil)	Walter Goncalves	28	5 ft 3 in (1.60 m)	Iron Hands		67–11	2–6	2025
(Lebanon)	Abdallah Ondash	25	5 ft 8 in (1.73 m)		Win - The Inner Circle 24 (Bangkok) - Chokpreecha P.K.TomTK.Alaiyont	25–2	9–1	2026
(Lebanon)	Ramadan Ondash	20	5 ft 6 in (1.68 m)	The Scorpion	Loss - ONE Friday Fights 178 (Bangkok) - Shimon Yoshinari	14–3	6–1	2026
Thailand	Kaotaem Fairtex	21	5 ft 5 in (1.65 m)		Win - The Inner Circle 9 (Bangkok) - Xavier Gonzalez	39–19–2	4–1	2026
(France)	Yonis Anane	19	5 ft 10 in (1.78 m)		The Inner Circle 41 (Bangkok) - Abdessamie Rhenimi	49–10	4–2	2026
England	Ellis Badr Barboza	26	5 ft 6 in (1.68 m)	El Jéfe	ONE Samurai 5 (Tokyo) - Masashi Kumura	17–7 (1)	2–2 (1)	2026
(Morocco)	Elmehdi El Jamari	29	5 ft 7 in (1.70 m)	The Sniper	(Nov 3) injury - out of ONE Samurai 5 (Tokyo) - Ryujin Nasukawa	28–3	2–2	2026
(Japan)	Shoma Okumura	20	5 ft 5 in (1.65 m)	The Destroyer of the Gale	Win - ONE Samurai 4 (Tokyo) - Toki Tamaru	10–3	5–1	2026

=== Atomweight (115 lb, 52.2 kg) ===
	Name	Age	Ht.	Nickname	Result / next fight / status	MT/KB record	ONE record	Year of last ONE fight
(Japan)	Nadaka Yoshinari (MT.C)	25	5 ft 4 in (1.63 m)		Win - ONE Samurai 3 (Yokohama) - Har Ling Om / Win - ONE Samurai 4 (Tokyo) - Rifdean Masdor	69–6–1	7–0	2026
(Thailand)	Songchainoi Kiatsongrit	26	5 ft 1 in (1.55 m)	Mini Hulk	The Inner Circle 41 (Bangkok) - Rifdean Masdor	60–22–2	10–4	2026
(Thailand)	Rak Erawan	25	5 ft 4 in (1.63 m)		The Inner Circle 39 (Bangkok) - Salai Htan Khee Shein	77–15	6–5	2026
(Thailand)	Numsurin Chor.Ketwina	31	5 ft 4 in (1.63 m)		Loss - The Inner Circle 36 (Bangkok) - Akram Hamidi	105–22–2	7–3	2026
(Malaysia)	Rifdean Masdor	24	5 ft 4 in (1.63 m)	Magic Boy	The Inner Circle 41 (Bangkok) - Songchainoi Kiatsongrit	47–9	7–2	2026
(Japan)	Toma Kuroda	25	5 ft 5 in (1.65 m)		Loss - ONE Samurai 1 (Tokyo) - Toki Tamaru	16–6–1	1–3	2026
(Japan)	Toki Tamaru	24	5 ft 4 in (1.63 m)	Jet Boy	Loss - ONE Samurai 4 (Tokyo) - Shoma Okumura	19–5 (2)	1–1	2026

=== Women's Strawweight (125 lb, 56.7 kg) ===
	Name	Age	Ht.	Nickname	Result / next fight / status	MT/KB record	ONE record	Year of last ONE fight
(Austria)	Stella Hemetsberger (MT.C),(KB.C)	27	5 ft 7 in (1.70 m)	Always Hungry	Win - ONE Fight Night 46 (Bangkok) - Natalia Diachkova	11–2	6–0	2026
(United States)	Jackie Buntan	29	5 ft 4 in (1.63 m)		Loss - ONE Fight Night 40 (Bangkok) - Stella Hemetsberger	7–3	7–3	2026
Russian Federation	Natalia Diachkova	32	5 ft 7 in (1.70 m)	Karelian Lynx	Loss - ONE Fight Night 46 (Bangkok) - Stella Hemetsberger	32–6	6–2	2026

=== Women's Atomweight (115 lb, 52.2 kg) ===
	Name	Age	Ht.	Nickname	Result / next fight / status	MT/KB record	ONE record	Year of last ONE fight
(Thailand)	Phetjeeja Lukjaoporongtom (KB.C)	24	5 ft 3 in (1.60 m)	The Queen	(Aug 18) - Hand injury - out of The Inner Circle 28 (Bangkok) - Antonia Prifti	210–7–3	8–1	2026
(Brazil)	Allycia Rodrigues (MT.C)	28	5 ft 3 in (1.60 m)		The Inner Circle 39 (Bangkok) - Charlotte Padié (MMA bout)	36–6	6–1	2026
(Hong Kong)	Yu Yau Pui	33	5 ft 5 in (1.65 m)		Win - ONE Fight Night 48 (Bangkok) - Marie McManamon	30–5	8–3	2026
(Thailand)	Stamp Fairtex	29	5 ft 2 in (1.57 m)		Win - ONE Fight Night 47 (Bangkok) - Selina Flores	66–18	6–3	2026
(Poland)	Martyna Domińczak	24	5 ft 5 in (1.65 m)		Win - ONE Fight Night 43 (Bangkok) - Johanna Persson	8–2	4–2	2026
(Israel)	Shir Cohen	25	5 ft 2 in (1.57 m)		Loss - ONE Friday Fights 143 (Bangkok) - Vero Nika	10–2	3–1	2026
(Myanmar)	Vero Nika	30	5 ft 4 in (1.63 m)	The Kayan Leopard	Win - The Inner Circle 15 (Bangkok) - Kana Morimoto	22–3	4–1	2026
(Brazil)	Gabriele Moram	25	5 ft 5 in (1.65 m)		Loss - The Inner Circle 31 (Bangkok) - Cynthia Flores	38–16	3–2	2026
(Japan)	Kana Morimoto	34	5 ft 3 in (1.60 m)	Krusher Queen	ONE Fight Night 50 (Bangkok) - Selina Flores	25–7	3–3	2026
(Republic of Ireland)	Marie McManamon	36	5 ft 5 in (1.65 m)	The Celtic Queen	Loss - ONE Fight Night 48 (Bangkok) - Yu Yau Pui	13–6	0–3	2025
(Mexico)	Cynthia Flores	31	5 ft 2 in (1.57 m)		Win - The Inner Circle 31 (Bangkok) - Gabriele Moram		1–3	2026
(United States)	Selina Flores	28	5 ft 7 in (1.70 m)	Teep Queen	ONE Fight Night 50 (Bangkok) - Kana Morimoto	9–2	1–1	2026

(KB.C)	Indicates the current Kickboxing champion
(MT.C)	Indicates the current Muay Thai champion

== Submission grappling ==
=== Middleweight (205 lb, 93 kg) ===
	Name	Age	Ht.	Nickname	Result / next fight / status	Grappling record	ONE Championship record	Year of last ONE fight
(United States)	Rafael Lovato Jr.	43	6 ft 3 in (1.91 m)		Loss - ONE Fight Night 47 (Bangkok) - Paweł Jaworski	136–59	1–1	2026
(United States)	Giancarlo Bodoni	31	5 ft 11 in (1.80 m)				0–1	2025

=== Welterweight (185 lb, 83.9 kg) ===
	Name	Age	Ht.	Nickname	Result / next fight / status	Grappling record	ONE Championship record	Year of last ONE fight
United States	Tye Ruotolo (C)	23	5 ft 10 in (1.78 m)		Win - ONE Fight Night 41 (Bangkok) - Pawel Jaworski	28–11	9–0	2026

=== Lightweight (170 lb, 77.1 kg) ===
	Name	Age	Ht.	Nickname	Result / next fight / status	Grappling record	ONE Championship record	Year of last ONE fight
United States	Kade Ruotolo (C)	23	5 ft 11 in (1.80 m)		(May 27) - injury - out of The Inner Circle (Bangkok) - Fabricio Andrey	29–3	5–0	2024
Norway	Tommy Langaker	32	5 ft 10 in (1.78 m)			141–33	2–3	2025
(Canada)	Dante Leon	31	5 ft 8 in (1.73 m)		Win - ONE Fight Night 42 (Bangkok) - Kenta Iwamoto	145–49	3–1	2026
(Brazil)	Marcelo Garcia	43	5 ft 8 in (1.73 m)	Marcelinho		86–18	1–1	2025

=== Featherweight (155 lb, 70.3 kg) ===
	Name	Age	Ht.	Nickname	Result / next fight / status	Grappling record	ONE Championship record	Year of last ONE fight
(Brazil)	Fabricio Andrey	26	5 ft 5 in (1.65 m)	Hokage	Loss - ONE Fight Night 44 (Bangkok) - Owen Jones	104–28–3	3–1	2026
(Japan)	Shoya Ishiguro	30	5 ft 5 in (1.65 m)		Loss - ONE Fight Night 48 (Bangkok) - Ruan Alvarenga		4–3	2026
(Brazil)	Ruan Alvarenga	28	5 ft 9 in (1.75 m)		Win - ONE Fight Night 48 (Bangkok) - Shoya Ishiguro		2–0	2026
(Brazil)	Joao Gabriel Sousa	29	5 ft 4 in (1.63 m)			134–41	1–1	2025

=== Women's Bantamweight (145 lb, 65.8 kg) ===
	Name	Age	Ht.	Nickname	Result / next fight / status	Grappling record	ONE Championship record	Year of last ONE fight
(United States)	Helena Crevar	19	5 ft 6 in (1.68 m)		Win - The Inner Circle 22 (Bangkok) - Paige Ivette Clymer	356–7	2–0	2026
(United States)	Teshya Alo	29	5 ft 4 in (1.63 m)		Loss - ONE Fight Night 39 (Bangkok) - Helena Crevar		0–1	2026

=== Flyweight (135 lb, 61.2 kg) ===
	Name	Age	Ht.	Nickname	Result / next fight / status	Grappling record	ONE Championship record	Year of last ONE fight
(Brazil)	Diogo Reis (C)	24	5 ft 5 in (1.65 m)	Baby Shark	ONE Fight Night 50 (Bangkok) - Carlos Oliveira	89–9	3–0	2026

(C)	Indicates the current champion

== See also ==
- List of ONE Championship champions
- List of ONE Championship alumni
- List of ONE Championship events
- List of ONE bonus award recipients
- 2026 in ONE Championship
- ONE Championship Rankings
- List of current UFC fighters
- List of current GLORY fighters
- List of current ACA fighters
- List of current Brave CF fighters
- List of current GFL fighters
- List of current Invicta FC fighters
- List of current KSW fighters
- List of current Oktagon MMA fighters
- List of current PFL fighters
- List of current Rizin FF fighters
- List of current Road FC fighters
