= ONE Fight Night 39 =

Combat sport events in 2026

ONE Fight Night 39: Rambolek vs. Dayakaev
- Promotion: ONE Championship
- Date: January 24, 2026
- Venue: Lumpinee Boxing Stadium
- City: Bangkok, Thailand
- Attendance: 4,200

Event chronology
ONE Fight Night 38	ONE Fight Night 39: Rambolek vs. Dayakaev	ONE Fight Night 40

ONE Fight Night 39: Rambolek vs. Dayakaev was a combat sports event produced by ONE Championship that took place on January 24, 2026, at Lumpinee Boxing Stadium in Bangkok, Thailand.

== Background ==
A bantamweight Muay Thai bout between Rambolek Chor.Ajalaboon and Abdulla Dayakaev headlined the event.The bout originally scheduled met at ONE Fight Night 37 in November 2025, but the bout was canceled after Dayakaev has a hand infection.

At the weigh-ins, one fighter failed to hydration test and missed weight for their respective fights:

- João Pedro Dantas weighed in at 160.8 pounds, 5.8 pounds over the featherweight limit and he was fined 30 percent of his purse which went to Mohammad Siasarani.

== Results ==
Fight card (Amazon Prime Video)
Weight class				Method	Round	Time	Notes
Bantamweight Muay Thai	Rambolek Chor.Ajalaboon	def.	Abdulla Dayakaev	KO (punch to the body)	2	2:41
Flyweight Muay Thai	Asadula Imangazaliev	def.	Kongthoranee Sor.Sommai	KO (punch to the body)	2	1:06
Welterweight	Chase Mann	def.	Isi Fitikefu	TKO (knee injury)	1	5:00
Women's Atomweight	Chihiro Sawada	def.	Natalie Salcedo	Decision (unanimous)	3	5:00
Featherweight Kickboxing	Mohammad Siasarani	def.	João Pedro Dantas	Decision (unanimous)	3	3:00	(Note: Dantas missed weight (160.8 lb).)
Women's Openweight Submission Grappling	Helena Crevar	def.	Teshya Noelani Alo	Submission (estima lock)	1	1:40	(Note: Originally Women's bantamweight, changed to Openweight.)
Strawweight	Bokang Masunyane	def.	Ryohei Kurosawa	Decision (unanimous)	3	5:00
Featherweight Muay Thai	Vladimir Kuzmin	def.	Mohanad Battbootti	Decision (unanimous)	3	3:00
Bantamweight	Carlo Bumina-ang	def.	Marcos Aurélio	TKO (punch)	2	0:50

== Bonus awards ==
The following fighters received $50,000 bonuses:

- Performance of the Night: Rambolek Chor.Ajalaboon and Asadula Imangazaliev

== See also ==
- 2026 in ONE Championship
- List of ONE Championship events
- List of current ONE fighters
- ONE Championship Rankings
