= ONE 165 =

Combat sport events in 2024

ONE 165: Superlek vs. Takeru
- The poster for ONE 165: Superlek vs. Takeru
- Promotion: ONE Championship
- Date: January 28, 2024
- Venue: Ariake Arena
- City: Tokyo, Japan

Event chronology
ONE Friday Fights 49: Nakrob vs. Pettonglor	ONE 165: Superlek vs. Takeru	ONE Friday Fights 50: Yodphupa vs. Komawut

ONE 165: Superlek vs. Takeru was a combat sport event produced by ONE Championship that took place on January 28, 2024, at the Ariake Arena in Tokyo, Japan.

== Background ==
The event marked the promotion's fourth visit to Tokyo and first since ONE: Century in October 2019. The event was originally host to Qatar, but moved to ONE 166 on March 1.

A flyweight kickboxing superfight between the ONE Flyweight Muay Thai Champion Rodtang Jitmuangnon and former three-divisions K-1 World Champion Takeru Segawa was expected to headline the event. This was mark the first time a non-title bout to be five rounds. However, Rodtang withdrew from the bout due to injury and was replaced by Superlek Kiatmuu9 for the ONE Flyweight Kickboxing World Championship bout.

A ONE Lightweight Submission Grappling World Championship rematch between current champion Kade Ruotolo and Tommy Langaker served as the co-main event. The pairing previously met at ONE Fight Night 11 which Ruotolo retained the title by unanimous decision.

A lightweight bout between former two-time ONE Lightweight Champion Shinya Aoki and Sage Northcutt was expected to take place at the event. Northcutt withdrew during the event due to two of his coaches (one being former WEC Featherweight Champion and UFC Hall of Famer Modern Wing Urijah Faber) not having work visas and was replaced by former ONE Bantamweight Champion John Lineker in a openweight bout.

== Results ==
Main card (PPV at Watch ONE)
Weight class				Method	Round	Time	Notes
Flyweight Kickboxing	Superlek Kiatmuu9 (c)	def.	Takeru Segawa	Decision (unanimous) (49–46, 49–46, 49–46)	5	3:00	(Note: For the ONE Flyweight Kickboxing World Championship.)
Lightweight Submission Grappling	Kade Ruotolo (c)	def.	Tommy Langaker	Decision (unanimous)	1	10:00	(Note: For the ONE Lightweight Submission Grappling World Championship.)
Openweight	Shinya Aoki	def.	John Lineker	Submission (rear-naked choke)	1	3:00
Catchweight (187.25 lb)	Nieky Holzken	def.	Yoshihiro Akiyama	TKO (punches)	1	1:40	(Note: Special rules super-fight bout (The first round contested under boxing rules, the second round contested under Muay Thai rules, and the third round contested under MMA rules).)
Catchweight (156.5 lb) Kickboxing	Marat Grigorian	def.	Sitthichai Sitsongpeenong	KO (knee and punch to the body)	3	1:20
Featherweight	Garry Tonon	def.	Martin Nguyen	Submission (rear-naked choke)	1	4:41
Women's Atomweight	Ayaka Miura	def.	Itsuki Hirata	Decision (unanimous)	3	5:00
Preliminary card (YouTube / Watch ONE)
Flyweight	Yuya Wakamatsu	def.	Danny Kingad	Decision (unanimous)	3	5:00
Heavyweight Kickboxing	Rade Opačić	def.	Iraj Azizpour	Decision (unanimous)	3	3:00
Strawweight	Bokang Masunyane	def.	Keito Yamakita	Decision (unanimous)	3	5:00
Strawweight	Gustavo Balart	def.	Hiroba Minowa	Decision (split)	3	5:00

== Bonus awards ==
The following fighters received $50,000 bonuses.

- Performance of the Night: Superlek Kiatmuu9, Kade Ruotolo, Shinya Aoki, Nieky Holzken, Marat Grigorian and Garry Tonon

== See also ==
- 2024 in ONE Championship
- List of ONE Championship events
- List of current ONE fighters
