= Chihiro Sawada =

Japanese mixed martial arts (MMA) fighter

- Born: November 23, 1997 (age 28); Tokyo, Japan
- Native name: 澤田千優
- Nationality: Japanese
- Height: 150 cm (4 ft 11 in)
- Weight: 105 lb (48 kg; 7 st 7 lb)
- Division: Atomweight (2021–2023); Strawweight (2023, 2024–present)
- Style: Freestyle wrestling
- Fighting out of: Tokyo, Japan
- Team: Team AKATSUKI
- Years active: 2021–present

Mixed martial arts record
- Total: 14
- Wins: 12
- By submission: 5
- By decision: 7
- Losses: 1
- By decision: 1
- Draws: 1

Other information
- University: Aoyama Gakuin University
- Mixed martial arts record from Sherdog

Chihiro Sawada (Japanese: 澤田 千優, Hepburn: Sawada Chihiro; born November 23, 1997) is a Japanese mixed martial artist and former wrestler, competing in the atomweight divisions of Shooto, Combate Global and ONE Championship. She is a former Shooto Women's Atomweight champion.

== Mixed martial arts career ==
=== Shooto ===
==== Early career ====
Sawada transitioned to the sport of mixed martial arts in 2021, following a successful amateur wrestling career, the standouts of which included a silver medal at the 2019 All Japan Adult Championship and a silver medal at the 2017 Asian Junior Championship.

Sawada made her professional debut against Yuki Ono at Professional Shooto 2021 Vol. 3 on May 16, 2021. The contest was ruled a unanimous decision draw, as all three ringside officials handed in a 19–19 scorecard.

==== Shooto Infinity League ====
It was announced on October 17, 2021, that Sawada would be one of four participants in the 2022 Shooto Atomweight Infinity League, which held to crown the inaugural Shooto Women's Atomweight champion. Each fighter earned a set number of points after each bout under the rules of the tournament, depending on whether the contest ended in a decision or stoppage victory or in a draw, with each fighter facing every other.

Sawada faced Miku Nakamura at Professional Shooto 2021 Vol. 7 on November 6, 2021, in the opening round of the tournament. She won the fight by majority decision, with two judges having scored the bout 20–18 in her favor, while the third judge had it scored as an even 19–19 draw. The victory earned her two points and a joint top place in the league standings.

Sawada faced the tournament favorite Hisae Watanabe at Professional Shooto 2022 Vol. 3 on May 22, 2022. She won the fight by a second-round submission. Sawada first knocked Watanabe down with a right overhand, before advancing to back mount and forcing her opponent to tap to a rear-naked choke. She earned an additional three points for the stoppage victory and the top place in the league standings.

Sawada was expected to face Haruna Kato at Professional Shooto 2022 Vol. 6 on September 19, 2022. Kato was forced to withdraw with vestibular disorder and paroxysmal positional vertigo. Although the fight was scrapped, Sawada was nonetheless awarded the full three points, bringing her to a total of eight, twice as much as the second-placed contestants had.

Sawada faced Yuki Ono at Professional Shooto 2022 Vol. 7 on November 27, 2022. She won the fight by majority decision, with scores of 20–18, 20–18 and 20–17. With ten total points, Sawada won the Infinity League tournament, as well as the inaugural Shooto Women's Atomeweight Championship.

=== ONE/Combate ===
Sawada made her ONE Championship debut against Sanaz Fayazmanesh at ONE Friday Fights 5 on February 17, 2023, in what was also her strawweight debut. She won the fight by a second-round submission. Fayazmanesh was forced to tap to an Americana 53 seconds into the penultimate round.

Sawada faced Ana Palacios at Combate Global: Mexico vs. Japan on May 13, 2023. She won the fight by unanimous decision. Following this victory, Sawada was ranked as the tenth best atomweight mixed martial artist in the world by Fight Matrix.

Sawada made her first Shooto Women's Atomweight Championship defense against Miku Nakamura at Shooto Colors Vol.2 on December 2, 2023. She won the fight by a first-round submission.

Sawada faced Jihin Radzuan on March 9, 2024, at ONE Fight Night 20. At weigh-ins, Radzuan missed weight, she weigh in at 120 pounds, 5 pounds over the atomweight limit and failed hydration, while Sawada failed hydration, with their bout was negotiated at a catchweight. Sawada won the fight by unanimous decision.

Sawada faced Noelle Grandjean at ONE Fight Night 22 on May 4, 2024. She won the fight by unanimous decision.

Sawada faced Meng Bo on January 11, 2025, at ONE Fight Night 27. She lost the fight by unanimous decision, suffering her first professional defeat.

Sawada faced Macarena Aragon at ONE Fight Night 33 on July 12, 2025. Aragon failed to make weight at the official weigh-ins, as she weighed in 2.25 lbs over the agreed upon limit. Sawada won the fight by a first-round submission.

Sawada faced Itsuki Hirata at ONE 173 on November 16, 2025, after stepping in for an injured Ritu Phogat. She won the fight by unanimous decision.

Sawada faced Natalie Salcedo at ONE Fight Night 39 on January 24, 2026. She won the fight by unanimous decision.

== Championships and accomplishments ==
=== Freestyle wrestling ===
2010

- (bronze) National Junior High School Championship (41 kg)

2012

- (bronze) Junior Queen's Cup (Junior High School Division) (44 kg)

2014

- (silver) Junior Queen's Cup (Cadet) (46 kg)
- (bronze) Asian Cadet Championship (46 kg)
- (bronze) Inter Highchool Wrestling Championships (46 kg)
- (gold) All Japan Women's Open Championship (46 kg)

2015

- (silver) Junior Queen's Cup (Junior) (44 kg)
- (gold) Junior Olympic Cup (44 kg)
- (gold) Asian Junior Championship (44 kg)
- (silver) Inter Highchool Wrestling Championships (46 kg)

2016

- (bronze) Junior Queen's Cup (Junior) (48 kg)
- (silver) Junior Olympic Cup (48 kg)
- (silver) East Japan Student Women's Championship (48 kg)
- (silver) All Japan Student Championship (48 kg)
- (silver) All Japan Women's Open Championship (Senior) (48 kg)

2017

- (bronze) Junior Queen's Cup (Junior) (48 kg)
- (silver) Junior Olympic Cup (48 kg)
- (silver) Asian Junior Championship (48 kg)
- (silver) East Japan Student Women's Championship (48 kg)
- (bronze) All Japan Student Championship (48 kg)
- (bronze) All Japan Women's Open Championship (Senior) (48 kg)

2018

- (gold) East Japan Student Women's Championship (50 kg)
- (gold) All Japan Amateur Championship (50 kg)
- (silver) All Japan Student Championship (50 kg)
- (bronze) All Japan Women's Open Championship (Senior) (50 kg)

2019

- (silver) All Japan Adult Championship (50 kg)
- (silver) All Japan Student Championship (50 kg)

=== Mixed martial arts ===
- Shooto
  - Shooto Women's Atomeweight Championship
    - One successful title defense
  - 2022 Shooto Atomweight Infinity League Winner

== Mixed martial arts record ==
Professional record breakdown
13 matches	12 wins	1 loss
By submission	5	0
By decision	7	1

Res.	Record	Opponent	Method	Event	Date	Round	Time	Location	Notes
Win	12–1–1	Ayaka Miura	Submission (armbar)	ONE Samurai 1	April 29, 2026	1	4:33	Tokyo, Japan	Performance of the Night.
Win	11–1–1	Natalie Salcedo	Decision (unanimous)	ONE Fight Night 39	January 24, 2026	3	5:00	Bangkok, Thailand	
Win	10–1–1	Itsuki Hirata	Decision (unanimous)	ONE 173	November 16, 2025	3	5:00	Tokyo, Japan	
Win	9–1–1	Macarena Aragon	Submission (armbar)	ONE Fight Night 33	July 12, 2025	1	3:52	Bangkok, Thailand	Catchweight (118.25 lb) bout; Aragon missed weight.
Loss	8–1–1	Meng Bo	Decision (unanimous)	ONE Fight Night 27	January 11, 2025	3	5:00	Bangkok, Thailand	
Win	8–0–1	Noelle Grandjean	Decision (unanimous)	ONE Fight Night 22	May 4, 2024	3	5:00	Bangkok, Thailand	
Win	7–0–1	Jihin Radzuan	Decision (unanimous)	ONE Fight Night 20	March 9, 2024	3	5:00	Bangkok, Thailand	Return to Strawweight; Radzuan missed weight (120 lb).
Win	6–0–1	Miku Nakamura	Technical Submission (armbar)	Shooto Colors Vol.2	December 2, 2023	1	4:57	Tokyo, Japan	Defended the Shooto Women's Atomweight Championship.
Win	5–0–1	Ana Palacios	Decision (unanimous)	Combate Global: Mexico vs. Japan	May 13, 2023	3	5:00	Miami, Florida, United States	Return to Atomweight.
Win	4–0–1	Sanaz Fayazmanesh	Submission (keylock)	ONE Friday Fights 5	February 17, 2023	2	0:53	Bangkok, Thailand	Strawweight debut.
Win	3–0–1	Yuki Ono	Decision (unanimous)	Professional Shooto 2022 Vol. 7	November 27, 2022	2	5:00	Tokyo, Japan	Won the 2022 Shooto Infinity League and the inaugural Shooto Women's Atomweight Championship.
Win	2–0–1	Hisae Watanabe	Submission (rear-naked choke)	Professional Shooto 2022 Vol. 3	May 22, 2022	2	0:59	Tokyo, Japan	
Win	1–0–1	Miku Nakamura	Decision (majority)	Professional Shooto 2021 Vol. 7	November 6, 2021	2	5:00	Tokyo, Japan	
Draw	0–0–1	Yuki Ono	Draw (unanimous)	Professional Shooto 2021 Vol. 3	May 16, 2021	2	5:00	Tokyo, Japan	Atomweight debut.

== See also ==
- List of current ONE fighters
- List of Shooto champions
