= Aliff Sor.Dechapan =

Malaysian professional Muay Thai fighter and kickboxer

- Born: Ahmad Nor Iman Aliff bin Rakib; February 4, 2004 (age 22); Rantau Panjang, Kelantan, Malaysia
- Nationality: Malaysian; Thai
- Height: 177 cm (5 ft 10 in)
- Weight: 57 kg (126 lb; 9 st 0 lb)
- Division: Super Flyweight; Super Bantamweight; Strawweight (ONE)
- Reach: 70 in (178 cm)
- Style: Muay Thai
- Stance: Orthodox
- Fighting out of: Bangkok, Thailand
- Team: Sor.Dechapan

Other information
- Notable relatives: Adam Rakib (brother)
- Boxing record from BoxRec

Ahmad Nor Iman Aliff bin Rakib (born February 2, 2004), known professionally as Aliff Sor.Dechapan (Thai: อาลีฟ ส.เดชะพันธ์), is a Malaysian-Thai professional Muay Thai fighter and kickboxer who currently competes in ONE Championship where he is the interim ONE Strawweight Muay Thai World Champion

== Biography and career ==
Aliff was born in Malaysia from a Thai father and a former Muay Thai fighter. Aliff began his training under the tutelage of his father at their home at age 7. His first bout took place in Kuala Lumpur while he was watching his older brother, Ahmad, compete. His father sent him to Bangkok, Thailand, for training until he was 14 years old.

=== ONE Championship ===
On November 10, 2023, Aliff faced Peiman Zolfaghari on ONE Friday Fights 40 at the Lumpinee Stadium. He won the fight by third-round technical knockout. After this victory Aliff was offered a $100,000 worth contract by ONE Championship.

Aliff faced Zhang Peimian at ONE Friday Fights 58 on April 5, 2024. He lost the bout via unanimous decision.

On July 6, 2024, Aliff faced Ellis Barboza at ONE Fight Night 23. He lost the fight by split decision.

Aliff faced Walter Goncalves on November 9, 2024, at ONE 169. He won the fight via unanimous decision.

On February 8, 2025, Aliff faced Shamil Adukhov at ONE Fight Night 28. He won the fight by first-round knockout.

On December 6, 2025, Aliff defeated Ramadan Ondash by unanimous decision at ONE Fight Night 38.

On July 24, 2026, Aliff faced Sam-A Gaiyanghadao for the interim ONE Strawweight Muay Thai World Championship at ONE: The Inner Circle 23. He won the fight by fifth-round technical knockout.

== Titles and accomplishments ==
=== Professional ===
- ONE Championship
  - 2026 interim ONE Strawweight Muay Thai World Championship

=== Amateur ===
- SEA Games
  - 2021 SEA Games Muay Thai -54 kg (gold)
- International Federation of Muaythai Associations
  - 2021 IFMA World Championships Junior (16–17) -51 kg (gold)
  - 2022 IFMA World Championships U23 -54 kg (gold)

== Fight record ==
Professional Muay Thai and Kickboxing Record
63 Wins, 9 Losses, 0 Draw
Date	Result	Opponent	Event	Location	Method	Round	Time
2026-12-18		(Thailand) Prajanchai Pongsuphan P.K.	ONE The Inner Circle 43	Bangkok, Thailand			
For the ONE Strawweight Muay Thai World Championship.
2026-07-24	Win	(Thailand) Sam-A Gaiyanghadao	ONE: The Inner Circle 23, Lumpinee Stadium	Bangkok, Thailand	KO (head kick and punches)	5	1:09
Won the interim ONE Strawweight Muay Thai World Championship.
2025-12-06	Win	(Lebanon) Ramadan Ondash	ONE Fight Night 38	Bangkok, Thailand	Decision (unanimous)	3	3:00
2025-06-07	Win	(Morocco) Elmehdi El Jamari	ONE Fight Night 32	Bangkok, Thailand	Decision (unanimous)	3	3:00
2025-02-08	Win	(Russia) Shamil Adukhov	ONE Fight Night 28	Bangkok, Thailand	KO (left hook)	1	1:10
2024-11-09	Win	(Brazil) Walter Goncalves	ONE 169	Bangkok, Thailand	Decision (unanimous)	3	3:00
2024-08-02	Win	(Morocco) Zakaria El Jamari	ONE Fight Night 24, Lumpinee Stadium	Bangkok, Thailand	KO (punches)	1	1:37
2024-07-06	Loss	(United Kingdom) Ellis Barboza	ONE Fight Night 23, Lumpinee Stadium	Bangkok, Thailand	Decision (split)	3	3:00
2024-04-05	Loss	(China) Zhang Peimian	ONE Friday Fights 58, Lumpinee Stadium	Bangkok, Thailand	Decision (unanimous)	3	3:00
2023-11-10	Win	(Iran) Peiman Zolfaghari	ONE Friday Fights 40, Lumpinee Stadium	Bangkok, Thailand	TKO (3 knockdowns)	1	1:44
2023-08-25	Win	(Thailand) Yangdam Jitmuangnon	ONE Friday Fights 30, Lumpinee Stadium	Bangkok, Thailand	Decision (unanimous)	3	3:00
2023-07-07	Win	(Thailand) Ratchadej Sor.Petjumrat	ONE Friday Fights 24, Lumpinee Stadium	Bangkok, Thailand	KO (left hook)	1	0:50
2023-04-21	Win	(Thailand) Rittidet Kiatsongrit	ONE Friday Fights 13, Lumpinee Stadium	Bangkok, Thailand	KO (spinning back elbow)	2	0:40
2022-08-21	Loss	(Thailand) Phetnamchok Pa-Doi Ayutthaya	Muay Thai 7see, Channel 7 Stadium	Bangkok, Thailand	Decision	5	3:00
2022-03-21	Loss	(Thailand) Phetnamngam Kiatphanthamit	Singmawin, Rajadamnern Stadium	Bangkok, Thailand	Decision	5	3:00
2022-01-16	Loss	(Thailand) Ratchadej T.N.MuayThai	Amarin Super Fight: Chang Muay Thai Kietpetch, Rajadamnern Stadium	Bangkok, Thailand	Decision	5	3:00
2021-11-21	Draw	(Thailand) Sudlor Odd TuekDaeng	Amarin Super Fight	Buriram province, Thailand	Decision	5	3:00
2021-03-13	Win	(Thailand) Petchrung Phetcharoen	Lumpinee TKO, Lumpinee Stadium	Bangkok, Thailand	Decision	5	3:00
2020-12-20	Win	(Thailand) Phetwichai Dechdecho	Muay Thai 7see, Channel 7 Stadium	Bangkok, Thailand	Decision	5	3:00
2020-09-12	Loss	(Thailand) Wuttikorn Por.Phetsiri	Muay Thai United Against COVID-19	Hat Yai, Thailand	Decision	5	3:00
2020-08-09	Win	(Thailand) Phetsangwan Sor.SamanGarment	Chang Muay Thai Kiatpetch, Or.Tor.Kor. 3 Stadium	Nonthaburi Province, Thailand	Decision	5	3:00
2020-03-08	Win	(Thailand) Saphaphet Singsamai	Chang Muay Thai Kiatpetch, Or.Tor.Kor. 3 Stadium	Nonthaburi Province, Thailand	Decision	5	3:00
2020-01-14	Loss	(Thailand) Singdam Kiatfufueang	Petchkiatpetch, Lumpinee Stadium	Bangkok, Thailand	Decision	5	3:00
Legend: Win Loss Draw/No contest Notes

Amateur Muay Thai Record
Date	Result	Opponent	Event	Location	Method	Round	Time
2023-05-05	Loss	(Russia) Egor Bikrev	2023 IFMA World Championships, First Round	Bangkok, Thailand	Decision (30:27)	3	3:00
2022-06-03	Win	(Iran) Mehrdad Khanzadeh	2022 IFMA World Championships, Final	Abu Dhabi, UAE	Decision (30:26)	3	3:00
Won the 2022 IFMA World Championships U23 -54kg Gold Medal.
2022-06-01	Win	(Philippines) Aldrich Toralba	2022 IFMA World Championships, Semifinals	Abu Dhabi, UAE	Decision (29:28)	3	3:00
2022-05-30	Win	(Bahrain) Hamad Alkawari	2022 IFMA World Championships, Quarterfinals	Abu Dhabi, UAE	Decision (30:26)	3	3:00
2022-05-22	Win	(Vietnam) Huynh Hoang Phi	2021 SEA Games, Final	Vĩnh Phúc, Vietnam			
Won the 2021 SEA Games Muay Thai -54kg Gold Medal.
2022-05-20	Win	(Philippines) Ariel Lee Lampacan	2021 SEA Games, Semifinals	Vĩnh Phúc, Vietnam	Decision (30:27)	3	3:00
2021-12-10	Win	(Russia) David Muradian	2021 IFMA World Championships, Final	Bangkok, Thailand	Decision (29:28)	3	3:00
Won the 2021 IFMA World Championships Junior (16-17) -51kg Gold Medal.
2021-12-09	Win	(Hungary) Patrik Polócz	2021 IFMA World Championships, Final	Bangkok, Thailand	TKO	2	
Legend: Win Loss Draw/No contest Notes
