= Tommy Langaker =

Brazilian jiu-jitsu practitioner from Norway

- Born: 8 February 1994 (age 32); Haugesund, Norway
- Height: 5 ft 10 in (1.78 m)
- Division: Middleweight
- Team: Wulfing Academy Kimura/Nova União
- Trainer: Jose Carlos
- Rank: Black belt in BJJ

Tommy Langaker (born February 8, 1994) is a Norwegian submission grappler and brazilian jiu-jitsu practitioner. He won the 2023 IBJJF no-gi world champion in the 79.5 kg division. He took the bronze medal in middle weight at the 2021 World Jiu-Jitsu Championship.

Hailing from Haugesund, he represents Wulfing Academy and Kimura/Nova União under the tutelage of Jose Carlos.

== Professional grappling career ==
=== 2020–2021 ===
Langaker served as the captain for Team Europe at Polaris Squads 2 on November 7, 2020. He won three matches by submission and finished one in a draw, guiding his team to a 9–0 victory over Team UK. He was then voted Jits Magazine Male Grappler of the Year (Gi) in 2020.

He returned for Polaris 18 on November 27, 2021, losing to Igor Tanabe by submission.

=== 2022–2023 ===
Langaker won the 77 kg division of the ADCC European, Middle-Eastern, and African Trials 2022 on May 7 and 8. He then lost to PJ Barch in the opening round of the 2022 ADCC World Championship on September 17.

He made his ONE Championship debut against Renato Canuto at ONE 160 on August 26, 2022. He won a decision and a $50,000 Performance of the Night bonus. Langaker then fought Russian grappler Uali Kurzhev at ONE Fight Night 7 on February 24, 2023. He won the match by submission and earned his second $50,000 Performance of the Night bonus.

He challenged ONE Lightweight Submission Grappling World Champion Kade Ruotolo at ONE Fight Night 11: Eersel vs. Menshikov on June 9, 2023. He lost by unanimous decision.

Langaker competed at the ADCC European, Middle-Eastern, and African Trials 2023 on September 16. He won a bronze medal in the 77 kg division. He then won the IBJJF European No Gi Championship 2023 at middleweight on October 29, 2023.

Langaker returned to Polaris for Polaris 26 on November 4, 2023, where he beat Oliver Taza by decision. He then competed at the IBJJF No Gi World Championship on December 9, 2023. He won a gold medal in the middleweight division.

=== 2024 ===
Langaker competed in a rematch against Kade Ruotolo at ONE 165 on January 28, 2024. He lost the match by decision.

Langaker competed in the under 77 kg division of the ADCC European, Middle-Eastern, and African Trials 2024. He won a gold medal and an invite to 2024 ADCC World Championship.

Langaker was booked to challenge Micael Galvão for the Who's Number One welterweight title at WNO 23 on May 10, 2024, but Galvão had to withdraw due to injury and was replaced by Andrew Tackett. Langaker lost the match by submission.

Langaker competed in the under 80 kg division of the inaugural Craig Jones Invitational on August 16 and 17, 2024. He defeated Renato Canuto by decision in the opening round and lost to Kade Ruotolo by decision in the quarter-final.

Langaker then competed in over 80 kg division of the Ocean BJJ Pro Championship on September 21, 2024. He lost a decision to Pawel Jaworski in the opening round.

Langaker faced Dante Leon at ONE Fight Night 27 on January 10, 2024. He lost the match via unanimous decision.

== See also ==
- 2023 in ONE Championship
- List of ONE Championship events
- List of current ONE fighters
