= ONE Fight Night 33 =

Combat sport events in 2025

ONE Fight Night 33: Rodrigues vs. Persson
- The poster for ONE Fight Night 33: Rodrigues vs. Persson
- Promotion: ONE Championship
- Date: July 12, 2025
- Venue: Lumpinee Boxing Stadium
- City: Bangkok, Thailand

Event chronology
ONE Friday Fights 115: Rambong vs. Suriyanlek	ONE Fight Night 33: Rodrigues vs. Persson	ONE Friday Fights 116: Adam vs. Mohammed 2

ONE Fight Night 33: Rodrigues vs. Persson was a combat sports event produced by ONE Championship that took place on July 12, 2025, at Lumpinee Boxing Stadium in Bangkok, Thailand.

== Background ==
A ONE Women's Atomweight Muay Thai World Championship bout between current champion Allycia Rodrigues and promotional newcomer Johanna Persson headlined the event.

Ilya Freymanov and undefeated promotional newcomer João Pedro Dantas were scheduled to meet in a featherweight MMA bout. However, Freymanov withdrew from the event due to personal reasons and was replaced by Ibragim Dauev.

At the weigh-ins, three fighters failed to hydration test and missed weight for their respective fights:

- Mohamed Younes Rabah weighed in at 156 pounds, 1 pounds over the featherweight limit and he was fined 30 percent of his purse which went to Shadow Singha Mawynn.
- Macarena Aragon weighed in at 118.25 pounds, 3.25 pounds over the atomweight limit and she was fined 30 percent of her purse which went to Chihiro Sawada.
- Cynthia Flores weighted in at 119.75 pounds, 4.75 pounds over the atomweight limit and she was fined 25 percent of her purse which went to Martyna Kierczyńska.

== Results ==
Fight card (Amazon Prime Video)
Weight class				Method	Round	Time	Notes
Women's Atomweight Muay Thai	Allycia Rodrigues (c)	def.	Johanna Persson	KO (punches)	3	0:59	(Note: For the ONE Women's Atomweight Muay Thai World Championship.)
Featherweight Muay Thai	Shadow Singha Mawynn	vs.	Mohamed Younes Rabah	NC (accidental eye poke)	2	0:12	(Note: Rabah missed weight (156 lb). Accidental eye poke rendered Rabah unable to continue.)
Featherweight	Ibragim Dauev	def.	João Pedro Dantas	Decision (unanimous)	3	5:00
Bantamweight Muay Thai	Vladimir Kuzmin	def.	István Ștefan Kóródi	Decision (unanimous)	3	3:00
Women's Atomweight	Chihiro Sawada	def.	Macarena Aragon	Submission (armbar)	1	3:52	(Note: Aragon missed weight (118.25 lb).)
Featherweight Muay Thai	Abdulla Dayakaev	def.	Nonthachai Jitmuangnon	KO (punch)	1	0:24
Women's Atomweight Muay Thai	Martyna Kierczyńska	def.	Cynthia Flores	Decision (unanimous)	3	3:00	(Note: Flores missed weight (119.75 lb).)
Bantamweight	Jhanlo Mark Sangiao	def.	Shinechagtga Zoltsetseg	Submission (rear-naked choke)	3	4:42

== Bonus awards ==
The following fighters received $50,000 bonuses:

- Performance of the Night: Allycia Rodrigues and Abdulla Dayakaev

== See also ==
- 2025 in ONE Championship
- List of ONE Championship events
- List of current ONE fighters
- ONE Championship Rankings
