= Kade Ruotolo =

American submission grappler and mixed martial artist

- Born: January 22, 2003 (age 23); Maui, Hawaii, U.S.
- Height: 5 ft 11 in (1.80 m)
- Weight: 76 kg (168 lb; 12 st 0 lb)
- Division: Featherweight
- Reach: 75 in (191 cm)
- Style: Submission Grappling, Brazilian Jiu-Jitsu
- Fighting out of: San Diego, California, U.S.
- Team: Atos Jiu-Jitsu; Art of Jiu Jitsu (AOJ) Combat Submission Wrestling (CSW)
- Trainer: André Galvão; Guilherme and Rafael Mendes (BJJ) Erik Paulson (MMA)
- Rank: BJJ black belt (under André Galvão)

Mixed martial arts record
- Total: 4
- Wins: 4
- By knockout: 1
- By submission: 3
- Losses: 0

Other information
- Notable relatives: Tye Ruotolo (twin brother)
- Mixed martial arts record from Sherdog

Kade Ruotolo (born January 22, 2003) is an American submission grappler and mixed martial artist. A competitor with his twin brother Tye since the age of 3, Ruotolo is an IBJJF World champion, Pan Am, and European Open champion at every coloured belt level. Promoted to black belt in December 2021, Ruotolo won the 2022 ADCC World Championship in the 77 kg division, becoming the youngest-ever ADCC Submission Fighting World champion at 19 years of age. Ruotolo is signed to ONE Championship, where he is the current lightweight submission grappling champion.

== Early life ==
Born in Maui, Hawaii, of Italian and Puerto Rican heritage, Ruotolo was raised in Huntington Beach, California, and began competing in jiujitsu at age 3. Kade and his twin brother Tye were considered "grappling's first child-stars". They trained at the Art of Jiu-Jitsu academy (AOJ) for 4 years under Guilherme and Rafael Mendes before switching to Atos Jiu-Jitsu in 2017, a team to which AOJ was affiliated. Both Kade and his brother Tye were promoted to brown belts in BJJ by André Galvão in October 2020. Ruotolo and his brother were promoted to black belt on December 14, 2021, by André Galvão.

== Grappling career ==
=== 2020–2021 ===
On November 29, 2020, Ruotolo competed at the Combat Jiu-Jitsu Lightweight World Championships and defeated four grapplers in one night to claim the title. His buggy choke submission finish of PJ Barch in the final match was awarded 'Submission of the Year' at the Jitsmagazine 2020 BJJ Awards.

Ruotolo then won the 77 kg division of the ADCC North American East Coast Trials on November 6, 2021, to claim an invite to the 2022 ADCC World Championship. He was later awarded with 'Submission of the Year' at the Jitsmagazine 2021 BJJ Awards for his flying d'arce choke finish of Joshua Dawson in the second round of the tournament. In preparation for the event, Ruotolo competed against Roberto Jimenez at Road to ADCC on July 17, 2021, and was submitted with a rear-naked choke. Across the weekend of September 25–26, Ruotolo competed at the Who's Number One Championships and defeated three opponents to become the promotion's inaugural Lightweight champion. At Grapplefest 10 on November 10, 2021, Ruotolo defeated Keith Krikorian by decision

On March 25, 2021, Ruotolo and his brother both signed a contract with ONE Championship to compete in submission grappling and eventually make their MMA debut. In his debut match at ONE 157, Ruotolo fought Shinya Aoki and won a unanimous decision.

=== 2022–2023 ===
Competing in the 77 kilograms (170 lb) division at the 2022 ADCC World Championship, an event commonly referred to as the "Olympics of grappling", Ruotolo became the youngest competitor to win gold, winning all fights by submission and notably submitting Micael Galvão in the final, the first grappler to do so in competition.

On October 21, 2022, Ruotolo faced multiple-time Sambo World Champion Uali Kurzhev for the inaugural ONE Lightweight Submission Grappling World Championship at ONE on Prime Video 3. After Kurzhev failed hydration twice, a catchweight of 174 lbs was established, four pounds heavier than initially intended, making Kurzhev ineligible for the belt. Ruotolo submitted Kurzhev with a heel hook at the 4:26 mark of the 10-minute bout to win the title and become the first-ever ONE Lightweight Submission Grappling World Champion.

Ruotolo defended his title against Matheus Gabriel on December 3, 2022, at ONE on Prime Video 5. He won the match via unanimous decision.

Ruotolo was booked to defend his ONE Championship lightweight title against Tommy Langaker at ONE Fight Night 11 on June 9, 2023. He won the match by decision and retained the title.

=== 2024 onwards ===
Ruotolo's next title-defense was booked for ONE 165 on January 28, 2024, where he would face Tommy Langaker in a rematch. He defeated Langaker by decision and retained his title.

Ruotolo made his black belt IBJJF debut in a superfight against Natan Chueng at the IBJJF No Gi Absolute Grand Prix on February 29, 2024. He won the match on points. Ruotolo then competed at the IBJJF Dallas Open 2024 on March 10, winning a gold medal at medium-heavyweight and a bronze medal in the absolute division.

Ruotolo faced Francisco Lo in a catchweight bout at 180lbs at ONE Fight Night 21 on April 5, 2024. He won the match by submission with an arm-in rear-naked choke.

Ruotolo was originally scheduled to compete in the 2024 ADCC World Championship, but both he and his brother Tye left the tournament in order to enter the -80 kg division of the inaugural Craig Jones Invitational on August 16–17, 2024. He submitted Matheus Diniz in the opening round, defeated Tommy Langaker by decision in the quarter-final, defeated Andrew Tackett by decision in the semi-final, and defeated Levi Jones Leary by decision in the final to win the grand prize of $1,000,000.

Ruotolo was scheduled to defend his ONE lightweight submission grappling title against the organization's flyweight submission grappling titleholder, Mikey Musumeci, on September 6, 2024, at ONE 168: Denver. However, on September 1, it was announced that Ruotolo had withdrawn from the bout due to injury.

== Mixed martial arts career ==
Ruotolo announced his intention to transition to mixed martial arts early in 2023, and the contract he signed to compete in grappling matches for ONE Championship also included provisions for MMA fights as well. Both Kade and his brother Tye announced that they were going to make their professional mixed martial arts debuts before the end of 2023. Although this didn't come to fruition, Ruotolo later confirmed that his professional debut would be in 2024.

Ruotolo made his professional MMA debut against Blake Cooper at ONE 167 on June 8, 2024. He won the fight by a rear-naked choke submission in the first round and earned the $50,000 Performance of the Night bonus.

Ruotolo faced Ahmed Mujtaba at ONE 169 on November 9, 2024. He won the fight by submission in the first round.

Ruotolo next faced Nicolas Alejandro Vigna at ONE 171 on February 20, 2025. He won the fight via an arm-triangle submission in the first round.

Ruotolo faced Hiroyuki Tetsuka at ONE Friday Fights 154 on May 15, 2026. He won by knockout in the second round after knocking Tetsuka down with a punch and finishing him with elbows.

== Brazilian Jiu-Jitsu competitive summary ==
Main Achievements:

- ONE Championship
  - ONE Submission Grappling Lightweight World Champion (One time; current)
  - 2024: Fighter of the Year (Tied with Superlek Kiatmuu9)
  - 2024: Submission of the Year vs. Francisco Lo (Tied with Tye Ruotolo def. Izaak Mitchell
- 2024 Craig Jones Invitational under 80 kg champion
- ADCC Submission Fighting World Champion (2022)
- Who's Number One (WNO) Champion (2021)
- GrappleFest 70KG Belt Holder (2020)
- EBI Combat Jiu-Jitsu Champion (2020)
- 3rd place 3QG Kumite 5 GP (2020)

Main Achievements (Kids + Juvenile):

- IBJJF World Champion (2019)
- IBJJF Pan Champion (2019)
- IBJJF European Open Champion (2019 (Note: Absolute))
- IBJJF Pan Kids Champion (2010 / 2014 / 2015 / 2017 / 2018)
- IBJJF Kids International Champion (2014 / 2016)
- IBJJF Kids American Nationals Champion (2014 / 2015)
- 2nd place IBJJF European Open (2019)
- 3rd place IBJJF Pan Championship (2019)

== Awards ==
- Jits Magazine BJJ Awards 'Submission of the Year' vs. Joshua Dawson at ADCC North American East Coast Trials (2021)
- Jits Magazine BJJ Awards 'Submission of the Year' vs. PJ Barch at Combat Jiu-Jitsu Lightweight World Championships (2020)
- Jits Magazine BJJ Awards ‘Match of the Year’ vs. Andrew Tackett at the Craig Jones Invitational 2024 (2024)
- Jits Magazine BJJ Awards ‘Male No Gi Grappler of the Year’ (2024)
- ONE Championship ‘Submission Grappler of the Year’ (2024)
- ONE Championship ‘MMA Fighter of the Year’ (2024)

== Instructor lineage ==
Mitsuyo "Count Koma" Maeda → Carlos Gracie, Sr. → Helio Gracie → Rolls Gracie → Romero "Jacare" Cavalcanti → Alexandre Paiva → Fernando "Tererê" Augusto → André Galvão → Kade Ruotolo

== Mixed martial arts record ==
Professional record breakdown
4 matches	4 wins	0 losses
By knockout	1	0
By submission	3	0

Res.	Record	Opponent	Method	Event	Date	Round	Time	Location	Notes
Win	4–0	Hiroyuki Tetsuka	KO (punch and elbows)	ONE Friday Fights 154	May 15, 2026	2	2:02	Bangkok, Thailand	Performance of the Night.
Win	3–0	Nicolas Alejandro Vigna	Submission (arm-triangle choke)	ONE 171	February 20, 2025	1	3:04	Lusail, Qatar	Catchweight (175 lb) bout; Vigna missed weight.
Win	2–0	Ahmed Mutjaba	Submission (brabo choke)	ONE 169	November 9, 2024	1	1:04	Bangkok, Thailand	Performance of the Night.
Win	1–0	Blake Cooper	Submission (face crank)	ONE 167	June 8, 2024	1	3:20	Bangkok, Thailand	Welterweight debut. Performance of the Night.
