= Itsuki Hirata =

Japanese mixed martial artist (born 1999)

- Born: August 24, 1999 (age 27); Adachi, Tokyo, Japan
- Native name: 平田 樹
- Nickname: Android 18
- Height: 157 cm (5 ft 2 in)
- Weight: 52 kg (115 lb; 8 st 3 lb)
- Division: Atomweight
- Reach: 159 cm (63 in)
- Style: Judo
- Teacher: Kazunori Yokota
- Rank: Blue belt Brazilian jiu-jitsu
- Years active: 2018–present

Mixed martial arts record
- Total: 14
- Wins: 9
- By knockout: 2
- By submission: 3
- By decision: 4
- Losses: 5
- By submission: 1
- By decision: 4

Amateur record
- Total: 4
- Wins: 4
- By submission: 4
- Losses: 0

Other information
- Mixed martial arts record from Sherdog
- Last updated on: October 17, 2026

Itsuki Hirata (Japanese: 平田 樹, Hepburn: Hirata Itsuki; born August 24, 1999) is a Japanese professional mixed martial artist. She is currently signed to ONE Championship, where she competes in the atomweight division. Hirata trained in judo throughout childhood before switching to mixed martial arts (MMA) upon graduating high school. After winning the third season of the Japanese reality television series and MMA competition Fighting Agent War in 2018, Hirata earned a contract with ONE and made her professional debut in 2019.

== Early life and amateur career ==
Following in the footsteps of her older brother Naoki, Itsuki Hirata started practicing judo at the Kodokan Judo Institute in first grade of elementary school at six years of age. With dreams of competing in the Olympics, she took third place in a national competition in fifth grade, and later won a prefectural judo championship in high school. Hirata had several surgeries throughout middle school and high school due to injuries she sustained in judo. She said she stopped thinking about the Olympics due to the amount of time these injuries sidelined her. It was during this time that Hirata started watching and became interested in mixed martial arts (MMA), which she thought looked fun and much freer than the "strict" rule-based judo. After graduating, she began training in MMA in summer 2018 under Kazunori Yokota at K-Clann gym in Tokyo.

Hirata won her first fight by submitting Momoka Yoshiwara at the amateur tournament held during Deep Jewels 21 on September 16, 2018. Hirata then competed in the third season of the AbemaTV reality TV show and MMA competition Fighting Agent War (格闘代理戦争, Kakutō Dairi Sensō), where she was coached by Hayato Sakurai and won all three of her bouts by submission. She defeated Yoshihiro Akiyama's fighter Bo Hyun Park in the first round of competition, and Rumina Sato's fighter Mio Tsumura in the second. Hirata defeated Shinya Aoki's fighter Mizuki Furuse in the finals on December 29, 2018, via Americana submission in the first round to earn 3 million yen and a professional contract with ONE Championship.

Formerly known by the nicknames "Otomeza no Koroshiya" (乙女座の殺し屋; "The Virgo Assassin") and "Strong Heart Fighter", Hirata officially changed her nickname to "Android 18" in 2021 due to often being told she looks like the character of the same name from the manga series Dragon Ball.

== Professional career ==
Hirata won her professional debut at ONE Championship: Legendary Quest on June 15, 2019, by submitting Angelie Sabanal with an Americana in the first round. At ONE Championship: Century on October 13, 2019, Hirata submitted Rika Ishige with an armbar at 4:41 of round two. Hirata was scheduled to face Bi Nguyen at ONE Championship: Warrior's Code on February 7, 2020, but Nguyen pulled out of the fight due to an injury and Nyrene Crowley stepped in on short notice. After Hirata failed to make the atomweight upper limit of 52 kg, the fight was contested at a catchweight of 53.4 kg. Hirata found herself in a third round for the first time against Crowley, and won the fight via TKO stoppage at 3:27 of the final round.

Hirata faced Miku Nakamura in the main event of ONE Championship: Road to ONE - Young Guns on February 22, 2021. She earned another TKO stoppage, defeating Nakamura at 2:34 of round 2. She was then announced as one of eight women taking part in ONE's Atomweight Grand Prix, with the winner earning a shot at the championship. In her first bout to go the distance, Hirata defeated Alyse Anderson by unanimous decision at ONE Championship: Empower on September 3, 2021. She was then scheduled to face Ritu Phogat in the grand prix's semifinals at ONE Championship: NextGen on October 29, 2021. However, Hirata pulled out of the grand prix four days before the fight due to a high fever.

Hirata then suffered her first loss at ONE: X on March 26, 2022, losing to Jihin Radzuan by split decision. Hirata questioned the judging, suggesting Radzuan should have won by unanimous decision instead. In May 2022, Hirata and her brother were some of the first fighters to take part in AbemaTV's Kaigai Musha Shugyō Project (海外武者修行プロジェクト), a program documenting young Japanese mixed martial artists that are given the opportunity to train at top-level MMA gyms in North America. Hirata faced Lin Heqin at ONE on Prime Video 1 on August 27, 2022. After Hirata missed weight and failed the hydration test, the match was contested at a catchweight of 54.0 kg and she forfeited 50% of her fight purse to Lin. Hirata won the bout by unanimous decision. She later stated that she missed weight because she accepted the fight on short notice. Hirata was scheduled to face Seo Hee Ham at ONE 163 on November 19, 2022, with the winner expected to receive a shot at the atomweight championship. However, Hirata missed weight and failed the hydration test, and the match was scrapped after Ham declined a catchweight bout due to Hirata's history of missing weight.

In January 2023, AbemaTV aired a program on Hirata that stated she flew to Japan in November 2022 after abnormalities were detected in her kidneys and liver during a medical checkup for the Ham fight. Although no abnormalities were detected in Japan, the doctor told her to take a break due to a hormone imbalance and to see if the weight cut had any further adverse affects. Hirata revealed that she had kidney disease in childhood, and that abnormalities were also detected in October 2021 before the ONE Atomweight Grand Prix semifinals. The match against Seo Hee Ham was rescheduled for March 25, 2023, at ONE Fight Night 8. Hirata lost the fight via unanimous decision. In April 2023, the South China Morning Post ranked Hirata at number nine on their ONE Championship women's pound-for-pound rankings.

Hirata faced fellow Japanese fighter Ayaka Miura on January 28, 2024, at ONE 165. She lost the fight by unanimous decision. Her next match was against Victória Souza at ONE 167 on June 8. She lost the fight via technical submission with a guillotine choke at 1:31 of the first round. Her next fight was against Aarti Khatri at ONE Friday Fights 120 on August 15, 2025. Hirata won by unanimous decision. Hirata was then scheduled to face Ritu Phogat at ONE 173 on November 16, 2025. When Phogat suffered a knee injury two weeks before the fight, she was replaced by Chihiro Sawada. Hirata lost the fight by unanimous decision. A fight against Phogat was then booked for the third time, and took place at ONE Samurai 1 on April 29, 2026. The bout was contested at a catchweight of 53.25 kg after Phogat missed weight. Hirata won by submission with a rear-naked choke at 2:42 of the final round, and earned a 4.5 million yen performance bonus. A rematch between Hirata and Jihin Radzuan took place at ONE Samurai 4 on October 17, 2026. Hirata won by unanimous decision.

== Personal life ==
Hirata's parents both support her martial arts career. Her father, who was strict with her judo in childhood, continued to drive her to and from MMA practice and thought of meals for cutting weight. Her older brother Naoki is also a mixed martial artist and a former Pancrase featherweight title-challenger, who has also competed in Deep. Hirata started training in MMA in summer 2018 under Kazunori Yokota at K-Clann gym in Tokyo. She left K-Clann in December 2020 and joined Krazy Bee, a Tokyo gym founded by Norifumi Yamamoto. Hirata then trained at New York-based Serra-Longo Fight Team from mid-2022 to 2023. She has also trained with Shinya Aoki, whom she has called the greatest Japanese mixed martial artist and cited as a role model for being oneself without worrying about the cameras.

Hirata has dated Yamamoto's nephew, Rizin Fighting Federation mixed martial artist Erson Yamamoto, and Deep mixed martial artist Jinnosuke Kashimura.

In 2022, she became the first Japanese fighter to be sponsored by Monster Energy.

== Championships and accomplishments ==
- Fighting Agent War
  - 3rd Season winner
- ONE Championship
  - 2021 Atomweight Grand Prix Semifinalist
  - Performance bonus (1 time) vs. Ritu Phogat

== Mixed martial arts record ==
Professional record breakdown
14 matches	9 wins	5 losses
By knockout	2	0
By submission	3	1
By decision	4	4

Res.	Record	Opponent	Method	Event	Date	Round	Time	Location	Notes
Win	9–5	Jihin Radzuan	Decision (unanimous)	ONE Samurai 4	October 17, 2026	3	5:00	Tokyo, Japan	
Win	8–5	Ritu Phogat	Submission (rear-naked choke)	ONE Samurai 1	April 29, 2026	3	2:42	Tokyo, Japan	Catchweight (117.4 lb) bout; Phogat missed weight. Performance of the Night.
Loss	7–5	Chihiro Sawada	Decision (unanimous)	ONE 173	November 16, 2025	3	5:00	Tokyo, Japan	
Win	7–4	Aarti Khatri	Decision (unanimous)	ONE Friday Fights 120	August 15, 2025	3	5:00	Bangkok, Thailand	
Loss	6–4	Victória Souza	Technical Submission (guillotine choke)	ONE 167	June 8, 2024	1	1:31	Bangkok, Thailand	
Loss	6–3	Ayaka Miura	Decision (unanimous)	ONE 165	January 28, 2024	3	5:00	Tokyo, Japan	
Loss	6–2	Ham Seo-hee	Decision (unanimous)	ONE Fight Night 8	March 25, 2023	3	5:00	Kallang, Singapore	
Win	6–1	Lin Heqin	Decision (unanimous)	ONE on Prime Video 1	August 27, 2022	3	5:00	Kallang, Singapore	Catchweight (119.25 lb) bout; Hirata missed weight.
Loss	5–1	Jihin Radzuan	Decision (split)	ONE: X	March 26, 2022	3	5:00	Kallang, Singapore	
Win	5–0	Alyse Anderson	Decision (unanimous)	ONE: Empower	September 3, 2021	3	5:00	Kallang, Singapore	ONE Women's Atomweight World Grand Prix Quarterfinal.
Win	4–0	Miku Nakamura	TKO (punches)	Road to ONE: Young Guns	February 22, 2021	2	2:34	Tokyo, Japan	
Win	3–0	Nyrene Crowley	TKO (punches)	ONE: Warrior's Code	February 7, 2020	3	3:27	Jakarta, Indonesia	Catchweight (115.7 lb) bout; Hirata missed weight.
Win	2–0	Rika Ishige	Submission (armbar)	ONE: Century – Part 1	October 13, 2019	2	4:41	Tokyo, Japan	
Win	1–0	Angelie Sabanal	Submission (americana)	ONE: Legendary Quest	June 15, 2019	1	2:59	Shanghai, China	Atomweight debut.

Exhibition record breakdown		
3 matches	3 wins	0 losses
By submission	3	0

Res.	Record	Opponent	Method	Event	Date	Round	Time	Location	Notes
Win	3–0	Mizuki Furuse	Submission (americana)	Fighting Agent War 3rd Season	December 29, 2018	1	2:54	Japan	Final round.
Win	2–0	Mio Tsumura	Submission (rear-naked choke)	Fighting Agent War 3rd Season	December 1, 2018	1	2:36	Japan	Semi-Final round.
Win	1–0	Bo Hyun Park	Submission (armbar)	Fighting Agent War 3rd Season	October 27, 2018	2	3:18	Japan	Quarter-Final round.
