= ONE Fight Night 11 =

Combat sport events in 2023

ONE Fight Night 11: Eersel vs. Menshikov
- The poster for ONE Fight Night 11: Eersel vs. Menshikov
- Promotion: ONE Championship
- Date: June 10, 2023
- Venue: Lumpinee Boxing Stadium
- City: Bangkok, Thailand

Event chronology
| ONE Friday Fights 20: Petsukumvit vs. Jaosuayai | ONE Fight Night 11: Eersel vs. Menshikov | ONE Friday Fights 21: Paidang vs. Kongsuk |

ONE Fight Night 11: Eersel vs. Menshikov was a Combat sport event produced by ONE Championship that took place on June 10, 2023, at Lumpinee Boxing Stadium in Bangkok, Thailand.

== Background ==
A ONE Lightweight Muay Thai World Championship bout between current champion Regian Eersel and newcomer Dmitry Menshikov headlined the event.

A ONE Lightweight Submission Grappling World Championship bout between current champion Kade Ruotolo and challenger Tommy Langaker took place at the event.

A Featherweight kickboxing fight between former ONE Featherweight Kickboxing World Champion Superbon Singha Mawynn and #5 ranked Tayfun Ozcan also took place at the event.

At weigh-ins, a muay thai bout between Martine Michieletto and Amber Kitchen was moved to a catchweight 129.25 pounds due to the pairing missing weight. Nieky Holzken weighed at 176 pounds, six pounds over the lightweight limit. The bout proceeded at catchweight with Holzken being fined 30% of his purse, which went to his opponent Arian Sadiković.

== Results ==
Main card (Amazon Prime Video)
| Weight class | | | | Method | Round | Time | Notes |
|---|---|---|---|---|---|---|---|
| Lightweight Muay Thai | Regian Eersel (c) | def. | Dmitry Menshikov | KO (punch) | 1 | 0:46 | (Note: For the ONE Lightweight Muay Thai World Championship.) |
| Lightweight Submission Grappling | Kade Ruotolo (c) | def. | Tommy Langaker | Decision (unanimous) | 1 | 10:00 | (Note: For the ONE Lightweight Submission Grappling World Championship.) |
| Featherweight | Ilya Freymanov | def. | Shinechagtga Zoltsetseg | Submission (rear-naked choke) | 1 | 2:18 |
| Featherweight Kickboxing | Superbon Singha Mawynn | def. | Tayfun Özcan | KO (head kick) | 2 | 1:46 |
| Strawweight | Mansur Malachiev | def. | Jeremy Miado | Submission (brabo choke) | 1 | 4:31 |
| Catchweight (176 lbs) Kickboxing | Arian Sadiković | def. | Nieky Holzken | Decision (unanimous) | 3 | 3:00 |
| Bantamweight | Kwon Won Il | def. | Artem Belakh | TKO (punches) | 2 | 3:57 |
| Catchweight (129.25 lbs) Muay Thai | Martine Michieletto | def. | Amber Kitchen | Decision (unanimous) | 3 | 3:00 |
| Flyweight | Hu Yong | def. | Woo Sung-hoon | Decision (split) | 3 | 5:00 |
| Heavyweight Kickboxing | Rade Opačić | def. | Guto Inocente | Decision (unanimous) | 3 | 3:00 |

== Bonus awards ==
The following fighters received $50,000 bonuses.

- Performance of the Night: Regian Eersel, Ilya Freymanov, Superbon Singha Mawynn and Kwon Won Il

== See also ==
- 2023 in ONE Championship
- List of ONE Championship events
- List of current ONE fighters
