= Hyu Iwata =

Japanese kickboxer

- Born: 岩多 陽勇; November 9, 2002 (age 23); Osaka, Japan
- Nickname: Mr.Pepper
- Height: 171 cm (5 ft 7 in)
- Weight: 61 kg (134 lb; 9.6 st)
- Style: Kickboxing, Kyokushin
- Stance: Orthodox
- Fighting out of: Osaka, Japan
- Team: Team Mehdi Zatout / TEAM3K (Kickboxing); Zenshin Kaikan (Karate)

Kickboxing record
- Total: 15
- Wins: 14
- By knockout: 6
- Losses: 1
- By knockout: 0

Hyu Iwata (Japanese: 岩多 陽勇, Iwata Hyū; born November 9, 2002) known simply as HYU is a Japanese kickboxer and karateka. He was the 2022 JFKO Fullcontact Karate All Japan Champion.

As of October 2026, he was the #10 ranked -61 kg kickboxer in the world by Beyond Kickboxing.

== Kickboxing career ==
=== Early career ===
Hyu made his professional kickboxing debut on September 18; 2022 at the Stand up vol.12 event where he deafeated Reo Wakabayashi by unanimous decision in a bout counting as the first round of the 2022 King of Rookie Tournament.

On December 25, 2022, Hyu defeated Hiroshi Noguchi by unanimous decision at RISE WORLD SERIES / SHOOTBOXING-KINGS 2022 to capture the King of Rookie -65 kg title.

On March 17, 2023, Hyu faced Ryuka at RISE ELDORADO 2024. He won the bout by unanimous decision.

On July 28, 2024, Hyu entered the Cage Kick Championship 4-man tournament at Professional Shooto 2024 vol.6. In the semifinals he defeated Kiteretsu by first-round knockout. In the final he knocked out Kazuteru Yamazaki also in the first round to win the CKC -63 kg tournament title.

=== ONE Championship ===
Hyu made his ONE Championship debut at ONE Friday Fights 81 against Youcef Esaad on September 27, 2024. He won the fight by unanimous decision.

On February 7, 2025, Hyu faced Leandro Miranda at ONE Friday Fights 96. He won the fight by second-round technical knockout.

On March 23, 2025, Hyu faced Zakaria El Jamari at ONE 172. he won the fight by first-round knockout.

On September 5, 2025, Hyu faces Jordan Estupiñan at ONE Fight Night 35. He won the fight by third-round technical knockout.

On March 16, 2026, Hyu defeated Suablack Tor.Pran49 by first-round knockout at ONE Fight Night 41.

Hyu suffered the first professional loss of his career when Taiki Naito defeated him by unanimous decision at ONE Samurai 1 on April 29, 2026.

On September 12, 2026, Hyu faced Hyuma Hitachi at ONE Samurai 3. He won the bout by unanimous decision.

== Championships and accomplishments ==
=== Kickboxing ===
- Shooto
  - 2024 Shooto Cage Kick Championship -63 kg Tournament winner
- Stand up
  - 2021 Stand up Amateur A-class -65 kg Tournament winner
  - 2022 Stand up King of Rookie -65 kg Tournament winner

=== Karate ===
- Japan Karate Judge Organization
  - 2022 JKJO All Japan Intercollege Fullcontact Championship Lightweight winner
- Japanese Fullcontact Karate Organization
  - 2021 JFKO All Japan Fullcontact Championship Light-middleweight runner-up
  - 2022 JFKO All Japan Fullcontact Championship Light-middleweight winner
- Byakuren Kaikan
  - 2017 Byakuren Kaikan All Japan Junior Championship Middle school runner-up
  - 2021 Byakuren Kaikan All Japan All Kyushu Championship Lightweight winner
  - 2021 Byakuren Kaikan All Japan Final Tournament Lightweight winner
- World Karate Organization
  - 2017 WKO All Japan Junior Championship Middle school runner-up
  - 2018 WKO Japan Athlete Cup Middle school -60 kg winner
  - 2018 WKO Kyushu Junior Championship Middle school winner
  - 2019 WKO All Japan Junior Championship High school winner
  - 2019 WKO Japan Athlete Cup Middle school -65 kg winner
  - 2020 WKO Japan Athlete Cup High school -65 kg winner
- Shinseikai Karatedo
  - 2017 Shinseikai Karatedo All Japan Junior Championship Middle school winner
- Karate Real Championships
  - 2019 All Japan Jr. Karate Real Championships High School Lightweight Winner

== Kickboxing record ==
Professional Kickboxing record
14 Wins (6 (T)KOs), 1 Loss, 0 Draw
| Date | Result | Opponent | Event | Location | Method | Round | Time |
| 2026-09-12 | Win | (Japan) Hyuma Hitachi | ONE Samurai 3 | Yokohama, Japan | Decision (unanimous) | 3 | 3:00 |
| 2026-04-29 | Loss | (Japan) Taiki Naito | ONE Samurai 1 | Tokyo, Japan | Decision (unanimous) | 3 | 3:00 |
| 2026-03-13 | Win | (Thailand) Suablack Tor.Pran49 | ONE Fight Night 41 | Yokohama, Japan | KO (knee to the body) | 1 | 2:34 |
| 2025-09-05 | Win | (Colombia) Jordan Estupiñan | ONE Fight Night 35 | Bangkok, Thailand | TKO (referee stoppage) | 3 | 1:45 |
| 2025-03-23 | Win | (Morocco) Zakaria El Jamari | ONE 172 | Saitama, Japan | KO (knee to the head) | 1 | 2:12 |
| 2025-02-07 | Win | (Portugal) Leandro Miranda | ONE Friday Fights 96, Lumpinee Stadium | Bangkok, Thailand | TKO (referee stoppage) | 2 | 0:42 |
| 2024-09-28 | Win | (Algeria) Youcef Esaad | ONE Friday Fights 81, Lumpinee Stadium | Bangkok, Thailand | Decision (unanimous) | 3 | 3:00 |
| 2024-07-28 | Win | (Japan) Kazuteru Yamazaki | Professional Shooto 2024 vol.6 - Cage Kick Championship, Final | Osaka, Japan | KO (punches) | 1 | 1:46 |
Won the Shooto Cage Kick Championship -63kg Tournament.
| 2024-07-27 | Win | (Japan) Kiteretsu | Professional Shooto 2024 vol.6 - Cage Kick Championship, Semifinals | Osaka, Japan | KO (left cross) | 1 | 2:16 |
| 2024-03-17 | Win | (Japan) Ryuka | RISE ELDORADO 2024 | Tokyo, Japan | Decision (unanimous) | 3 | 3:00 |
| 2023-12-10 | Win | (Japan) Kanta Motoyama | RISE 174 | Tokyo, Japan | Decision (unanimous) | 3 | 3:00 |
| 2023-08-18 | Win | (Japan) Masahito Okuyama | RISE 171 | Tokyo, Japan | Decision (unanimous) | 3 | 3:00 |
| 2023-02-23 | Win | (Japan) Ryuki Yoshioka | RISE 165 | Tokyo, Japan | Decision (unanimous) | 3 | 3:00 |
| 2022-12-25 | Win | (Japan) Hiroshi Noguchi | RISE WORLD SERIES / SHOOTBOXING-KINGS 2022 - King of Rookie, Final | Tokyo, Japan | Decision (unanimous) | 3 | 3:00 |
Won the 2022 King of Rookie -65kg title.
| 2022-09-18 | Win | (Japan) Reo Wakabayashi | Stand up vol.12 - King of Rookie, Semifinals | Tokyo, Japan | Decision (unanimous) | 3 | 3:00 |
Legend: Win Loss Draw/No contest Notes

== See also ==
- List of male kickboxers
