= Avazbek Kholmirzaev =

Uzbek mixed martial artist

- Born: Avazbek Xolmirzayev; December 4, 2000 (age 25); Bulungʻur District, Samarkand Region, Uzbekistan
- Native name: Avazbek Xolmirzayev; Авазбек Холмирзайев أفازبيك خولميرزايف
- Nickname: Ninzya
- Height: 5 ft 9 in (175 cm)
- Weight: 133.8 lb (61 kg; 9 st 8 lb)
- Division: Bantamweight (Note: As Avazbek is currently competing in ONE, he fights at 135 lbs. ONE Championship refers to their 135 lb division as Flyweight, but per the Association of Boxing Commissions in the United States, 135 lbs is considered Bantamweight.) (2022-present); Flyweight (Note: As Avazbek is currently competing in ONE, he fights at 125 lbs. ONE Championship refers to their 125 lb division as Strawweight, but per the Association of Boxing Commissions in the United States, 125 lbs is considered Flyweight.) (2023-present)
- Fighting out of: Tashket, Uzbekistan; Phuket, Thailand
- Team: Raqobat Gym; Phuket Chalong MMA
- Years active: 2022-present

Mixed martial arts record
- Total: 18
- Wins: 16
- By knockout: 9
- By submission: 6
- By decision: 1
- Losses: 2
- By submission: 1
- By decision: 1

Other information
- Occupation: mixed martial artist, former military officer of the Armed Forces of the Republic of Uzbekistan
- Mixed martial arts record from Sherdog

Avazbek Kholmirzaev (Uzbek: Avazbek Xolmirzayev, Авазбек Холмирзайев; born December 4, 2000) is an Uzbek professional mixed martial artist who currently competes in the Flyweight and Strawweight divisions of ONE Championship, where he is the current ONE Flyweight MMA World Champion. He formerly competed in UMMAA and Alash Pride.

== Early life ==
Avazbek Xolmirzayev was born in Bulungʻur District, Samarkand Region in Uzbekistan, on December 4, 2000.

== Mixed martial arts career ==
=== Early career ===
Kholmirzaev made his mixed martial arts debut on April 12, 2022, in a UMMAA (Uzbekistan Mixed Martial Arts Association) sponsored card, against Begzod Atazhonov. He won the fight via TKO in the first round, due to his opponent suffering a hand injury.

Avazbek fought in UMMAA: Fight Club Battle, against Zurab Magarammov, on September 1, 2022. He won the fight in the first round, by TKO via corner’s stoppage.

Kholmirzaev faced Nurdaulet Bekmyrza at Alash Pride 77, on November 26, 2022. He won the fight in the second round, due to strikes.

Kholmirzaev fought Seytkhan Meirkhanov at Alash Pride 80, on January 29, 2023. He lost his first fight via submission in the first round, due to an armbar.

Avazbek faced Azatbek Nurkamilov at Alash Pride 82, on February 21 of 2023. He won the fight via TKO in the third round, due to punches.

Avazbek fought Makhmudkhan Beibit at Alash Pride 87, on July 19 of 2023. He won the fight via submission in the second round, due to a guillotine choke.

Kholmirzaev faced Talant Esdaulet at Alash Pride 90, on October 20, 2023. He won the fight via knockout in the second round, due to a spinning back kick to the body.

=== ONE Championship ===
Kholmirzaev made his ONE Championship debut against Leandro Gomes at ONE Friday Fights 50, on February 2, 2024. He won the fight in the first round due to an armbar.

Avazbek fought Zayundin Suleymanov at ONE Friday Fights 59, on April 19, 2024. He won the fight via TKO in the third round, due to a spinning back kick and mounted punches.

Avazbek faced Kara-Ool Changy at ONE Friday Fights 69, on July 5, 2024. He won the fight by submission in the first round due to an armbar. He was given his first Performance of The Night bonus.

Kholmirzaev fought Bektur Zhenishbek Uulu at ONE Friday Fights 80, on September 20 of 2024. He lost the fight by unanimous decision.

Kholmirzaev fought Valmir Galiev at ONE Friday Fights 90, on December 6, 2024. He won the fight by submission in the second round, due to a rear-naked choke.

Avazbek fought Bolat Zamanbekov at ONE Friday Fights 98, on February 28, 2025. He won the fight via submission in the first round, due to a guillotine choke.

Kholmirzaev faced Robson de Oliveira at ONE Friday Fights 107, on May 9, 2025. He won the fight by TKO in the second round, due to repeated elbows and punches.

Avazbek fought former DEEP Flyweight Champion Tatsumitsu Wada, in a 127 lb catchweight bout. The contest happened at ONE Friday Fights 116, on July 18, 2025. He won the fight by unanimous decision.

Kholmirzaev faced former EFC Worldwide Flyweight Champion Willie van Rooyen in a 140 lb catchweight fight at ONE Fight Night 37, on November 8 of 2025. He won the fight via submission in the first round, due to an armbar.

Avazbek faced Jeremy Miado at ONE Fight Night 38, on December 5, 2025. He won the fight via technical knockout in the second round, due to punches.

==== ONE Flyweight Champion ====
Kholmirzaev fought the concurrent champion Yuya Wakamatsu for the ONE Flyweight MMA World Championship at ONE Samurai 1, on April 29, 2026. He won the fight via knockout in the second round, due to a spinning back elbow. In succession, he became the flyweight champion and was recognized as the first major Uzbek mixed martial arts champion in the promotion, and had won his second Performance of The Night bonus after the pay-per-view concluded.

== Personal life and military career ==
Avazbek is a devout Muslim, as he was raised in a Muslim household, and cites his faith in helping develop his mental toughness.

During his teenage years, Kholmirzaev enlisted in the Armed Forces of the Republic of Uzbekistan, in mandatory service in Uzbekistan. He has been discharged from the military, and has said that the service made himself stronger mentally, and helped his focus.

== Championships and accomplishments ==
- ONE Championship
  - ONE Flyweight MMA World Championship (One time, current)
    - First Uzbek fighter to win a title in ONE Championship
  - Performance of the Night (Two times) vs. Kara-Ool Changy and Yuya Wakamatsu

== Mixed martial arts record ==
Professional record breakdown
18 matches	16 wins	2 losses
By knockout	9	0
By submission	6	1
By decision	1	1

Res.	Record	Opponent	Method	Event	Date	Round	Time	Location	Notes
Win	16-2	Yuya Wakamatsu	KO (spinning back elbow)	ONE Samurai 1	April 29, 2026	2	4:53	Tokyo, Japan	Won the ONE Flyweight Championship (135 lb). Performance of the Night.
Win	15-2	Jeremy Miado	TKO (punches)	ONE on Prime Video 38	December 6, 2025	2	4:54	Bangkok, Thailand	
Win	14-2	Willie van Rooyen	Submission (armbar)	ONE on Prime Video 37	November 8, 2025	1	3:52	Bangkok, Thailand	Catchweight (140 lb) bout.
Win	13-2	Tatsumitsu Wada	Submission (armbar)	ONE Friday Fights 116	July 18, 2025	3	5:00	Bangkok, Thailand	Catchweight (127 lb) bout.
Win	12-2	Robson de Oliveira	TKO (elbows and punches)	ONE Friday Fights 107	May 9, 2025	2	3:44	Bangkok, Thailand	Catchweight (128 lb) bout.
Win	11-2	Bolat Zamanbekov	Submission (guillotine choke)	ONE Friday Fights 98	February 28, 2025	1	1:31	Bangkok, Thailand	
Win	10-2	Valmir Galiev	Submission (rear-naked choke)	ONE Friday Fights 90	December 6, 2024	2	1:32	Bangkok, Thailand	
Loss	9-2	Bektur Zhenishbek Uulu	Decision (unanimous)	ONE Friday Fights 80	September 20, 2024	3	5:00	Bangkok, Thailand	
Win	9-1	Changy Kara-Ool	Submission (armbar)	ONE Friday Fights 69	July 5, 2024	1	3:39	Bangkok, Thailand	Performance of the Night.
Win	8-1	Zayundin Suleymanov	TKO (spinning back kick and punches)	ONE Friday Fights 59	April 19, 2024	3	0:16	Bangkok, Thailand	
Win	7-1	Leandro Gomes	Submission (guillotine choke)	ONE Friday Fights 50	February 2, 2024	1	4:40	Bangkok, Thailand	
Win	6-1	Talant Esdaulet	KO (spinning back kick)	Alash Pride 90	October 20, 2023	2	0:22	Taraz, Kazakhstan	
Win	5-1	Makhmudkhan Beibit	Submission (guillotine choke)	Alash Pride 87	July 29, 2023	2	2:50	Shymkent, Kazakhstan	
Win	4-1	Azatbek Nurkamilov	TKO (punches)	Alash Pride 82	February 21, 2023	3	4:06	Bishkek, Kyrgyzstan	Flyweight debut.
Loss	3-1	Seytkhan Meirkhanov	Submission (triangle choke)	Alash Pride 80	January 29, 2023	1	4:11	Shymkent, Kazakhstan	
Win	3-0	Nurdaulet Bekmyrza	TKO (strikes)	Alash Pride 77	November 26, 2022	2	2:48	Almaty, Kazakhstan	
Win	2-0	Zurab Magarammov	TKO (corner stoppage)	UMMAA: Fight Club Battle	September 1, 2022	1	2:05	Namangan, Uzbekistan	
Win	1-0	Begzod Atazhonov	TKO (hand injury)	UMMAA-sponsored event	April 12, 2022	2	0:52	Samarkand, Uzbekistan	Bantamweight debut.

== See also ==
  - List of ONE Championship champions
