= ONE Fight Night 38 =

Combat sport events in 2025

ONE Fight Night 38: Andrade vs. Baatarkhuu
- Promotion: ONE Championship
- Date: December 6, 2025
- Venue: Lumpinee Boxing Stadium
- City: Bangkok, Thailand

Event chronology
ONE 173: Superbon vs. Noiri	ONE Fight Night 38: Andrade vs. Baatarkhuu	TBA

ONE Fight Night 38: Andrade vs. Baatarkhuu was a combat sports event produced by ONE Championship that took place on December 6, 2025, at Lumpinee Boxing Stadium in Bangkok, Thailand.

== Background ==
A ONE Bantamweight World Championship bout between current Champion Fabrício Andrade and Enkh-Orgil Baatarkhuu headlined the event.

A ONE Flyweight Submission Grappling World Championship bout for the vacant title between Diogo Reis and promotional newcomer Daiki Yonekura served as the event.

At the weigh-ins, two fighters failed to hydration test and missed weight for their respective fights:

- Ramadan Ondash weighed in at 125.6 pounds, 0.6 pounds over the strawweight limit and he was fined 30 percent of his purse which went to Aliff Sor.Dechapan.
- Shinji Suzuki weighted in at 149.4 pounds, 4.4 pounds over the bantamweight limit and he was fined 30 percent of his purse which went to Dmitrii Kovtun.

== Results ==
Fight card (Amazon Prime Video)
Weight class				Method	Round	Time	Notes
Bantamweight	Enkh-Orgil Baatarkhuu	def.	Fabrício Andrade (c)	Submission (rear-naked choke)	4	1:33	(Note: For the ONE Bantamweight World Championship.)
Strawweight Muay Thai	Aliff Sor.Dechapan	def.	Ramadan Ondash	Decision (unanimous)	3	3:00	(Note: Ondash missed weight (125.6 lb).)
Flyweight Submission Grappling	Diogo Reis	def.	Daiki Yonekura	Decision (unanimous)	1	10:00	(Note: For the vacant ONE Flyweight Submission Grappling World Championship.)
Women's Atomweight Muay Thai	Phetjeeja Lukjaoporongtom	def.	Martyna Domińczak	TKO (punch)	1	2:46
Lightweight Submission Grappling	Lachlan Giles	def.	Marcelo Garcia	Submission (kneebar)	1	7:03
Bantamweight Muay Thai	Dmitrii Kovtun	def.	Shinji Suzuki	Decision (unanimous)	3	3:00	(Note: Suzuki missed weight (149.4 lb).)
Flyweight	Avazbek Kholmirzaev	def.	Jeremy Miado	TKO (punches)	2	4:54

== Bonus awards ==
The following fighters received $50,000 bonuses:

- Performance of the Night: Enkh-Orgil Baatarkhuu

== See also ==
- 2025 in ONE Championship
- List of ONE Championship events
- List of current ONE fighters
- ONE Championship Rankings
