= List of ONE bonus award recipients =

ONE Bonus Awards :A cash bonus known as the "ONE Warrior bonus" was introduced on 9 July 2014 and implemented for the first time at ONE Fighting Championship: War of Dragons on 11 July 2014.

An award of US$50,000 is given out at the end of certain events to the fighter who impresses the most in terms of:

- thrilling the fans with exciting action;
- demonstrating an incredible warrior spirit;
- exhibiting amazing skill, and;
- delivering a phenomenal finish.

Victor Cui stated that bonuses would be handed out on a discretionary basis: "For every event, the bar will be very, very high. If a few fighters impress me, then I will hand out the bonus to a few fighters. If no one impresses me, then no one will get it. Extraordinary performance deserves extraordinary rewards. Ordinary performances deserve ordinary rewards."

The "ONE Warrior bonus" of $50,000 was re-introduced in January 2022, with a minimum of one bonus and a maximum of five bonuses awarded at each event.

== Award recipients ==
Event	Performance of the Night		Bonus	Ref.
ONE Friday Fights 120	Gingsanglek Tor.Laksong	Wuttikrai Wor.Chakrawut	$10,000	
ONE Friday Fights 120	Jurai Ishii	—	$10,000	
ONE Friday Fights 119	Petlampun Muadablampang	Abdessamie Rhenimi	$10,000	
ONE Friday Fights 119	Sanit Lookthamsuea	Masahito Okuyama	$10,000	
ONE Fight Night 34	Regian Eersel	Ryugo Takeuchi	$50,000	
ONE Friday Fights 118	Zhang Jingtao	—	$10,000	
ONE Friday Fights 117	Elbrus Osmanov	Teeyai P.K.Saenchai	$10,000	
ONE Friday Fights 117	Tyson Harrison	—	$10,000	
ONE Friday Fights 116	Nahyan Mohammed	Antar Kacem	$10,000	
ONE Friday Fights 116	Tomyamkoong Bhumjaithai	Pamor-E-Daeng Chor.Chokamnuaychai	$10,000	
ONE Friday Fights 116	Isaac Mohammed	—	$10,000	
ONE Fight Night 33	Allycia Rodrigues	Abdulla Dayakaev	$50,000	
ONE Friday Fights 115	Suriyanlek Por.Yenying	Gingsanglek Tor.Laksong	$10,000	
ONE Friday Fights 115	Shoya Ishiguro	—	$10,000	
ONE Friday Fights 114	Muangthai P.K.Saenchai	Saeksan Or. Kwanmuang	$10,000	
ONE Friday Fights 114	Aslamjon Ortikov	Ramadan Ondash	$10,000	
ONE Friday Fights 114	Jurai Ishii	—	$10,000	
ONE Friday Fights 113	Yodlekpet Or.Atchariya	Numsurin Chor.Ketwina	$10,000	
ONE Friday Fights 113	Asadula Imangazaliev	—	$10,000	
ONE Friday Fights 112	Thway Lin Htet	Payaksurin JP.Power	$10,000	
ONE Friday Fights 112	Tahaneak Nayokatasala	Samanchai Sor.Sommai	$10,000	
ONE Friday Fights 112	Hiroki Naruo	—	$10,000	
ONE Fight Night 32	Jaosuayai Mor. Krungthepthonburi	—	$50,000	
ONE Friday Fights 111	Pompet Panthonggym	Islay Erika Bomogao	$10,000	
ONE Friday Fights 111	Michael Baranov	Maksim Bakhtin	$10,000	
ONE Friday Fights 110	Samingdam N.F.Looksuan	Lamsing Sor.Dechapan	$10,000	
ONE Friday Fights 110	Tun Min Aung	YodUdon BS Muaythai	$10,000	
ONE Friday Fights 110	Toyota Eaglemuaythai	—	$10,000	
ONE Friday Fights 109	Wuttikrai Wor.Chakrawut	Chama Superbon Training Camp	$10,000	
ONE Friday Fights 109	Bernueng Sor.Salacheep	Alessio Malatesta	$10,000	
ONE Friday Fights 108	Kongchai Chanaidonmuang	Aekkalak Sor.Samarngarment	$10,000	
ONE Friday Fights 108	Tengnueng Fairtex	—	$10,000	
ONE Friday Fights 107	Vero Nika	Isaac Mohammed	$10,000	
ONE Friday Fights 107	Norika Ryu	—	$10,000	
ONE Fight Night 31	Nong-O Hama	—	$50,000	
ONE Friday Fights 106	Panrit Lukjaomaesaiwaree	Banluelok Sitwatcharachai	$10,000	
ONE Friday Fights 106	Rustam Yunusov	—	$10,000	
ONE Friday Fights 105	Kaotaem Fairtex	Jaradchai Maxjandee	$10,000	
ONE Friday Fights 105	Tezuka Shota	—	$10,000	
ONE Friday Fights 104	Chartpayak Saksatoon	Pet Suanluangrodyok	$10,000	
ONE Friday Fights 104	Petninmungkorn NamkaengIceland	Stella Hemetsberger	$10,000	
ONE Friday Fights 104	Hiroki Naruo	—	$10,000	
ONE Fight Night 30	Roman Kryklia	Nico Carrillo	$50,000	
ONE Friday Fights 103	Kulabdam Sor.Jor.Piek-U-Thai	Watcharapon P.K.Saenchai	$10,000	
ONE Friday Fights 103	Face Erawan	Lucas Ganin	$10,000	
ONE 172	Rodtang Jitmuangnon	Masaaki Noiri	$50,000	
ONE 172	Yuya Wakamatsu	Adrian Lee	$50,000	
ONE Friday Fights 101	Nakrob Fairtex	Chokpreecha P.K.Saenchai	$10,000	
ONE Friday Fights 101	Khunsuek Superbon Training Camp	Carlos Alvarez	$10,000	
ONE Friday Fights 100	Nieky Holzken	—	$50,000	
ONE Friday Fights 100	Muangthai P.K.Saenchai	Suakim Sor.Jor.Tongprajin	$10,000	
ONE Friday Fights 100	Jaosuayai Mor.Krungthepthonburi	Shadow Singha Mawynn	$10,000	
ONE Friday Fights 100	Jang Seong-gyu	—	$10,000	
ONE Fight Night 29	Allycia Rodrigues	Rambolek Chor.Ajalaboon	$50,000	
ONE Fight Night 29	Shamil Erdogan	—	$50,000	
ONE Friday Fights 99	Lamsing Sor.Dechapan	Wuttikrai Wor.Chakrawut	$10,000	
ONE Friday Fights 99	Haruyuki Tanitsu	Ivan Gnizditskiy	$10,000	
ONE Friday Fights 98	Chabakaew Sor.Kanjanchai	Nongbia LaoLaneXang	$10,000	
ONE Friday Fights 98	Issei Yonaha	—	$10,000	
ONE 171	Joshua Pacio	Roberto Soldić	$50,000	
ONE 171	Shamil Erdogan	Ayaka Miura	$50,000	
ONE 171	Kade Ruotolo	—	$50,000	
ONE Friday Fights 97	Francisca Vera	Vero Nika	$10,000	
ONE Friday Fights 97	Khunponnoi Sor.Sommai	Tomioka Yusei	$10,000	
ONE Friday Fights 97	Jayson Miralpez	—	$10,000	
ONE Fight Night 28	Prajanchai P.K.Saenchai	—	$100,000	
ONE Fight Night 28	Zhang Lipeng	—	$50,000	
ONE Friday Fights 96	Komawut FA.Group	Donking Yotharakmuaythai	$10,000	
ONE Friday Fights 96	Singtanawat Nokjeanladkrabang	Nahyan Mohammed	$10,000	
ONE Friday Fights 96	Abdulla Dayakaev	Hyu Iwata	$10,000	
ONE Friday Fights 95	Jaosuayai Mor.Krungthepthonburi	Chalamdam Sor.Boonmeerit	$10,000	
ONE Friday Fights 95	Padejsuk N.F.Looksuan	Jaroenporn TaiKubon	$10,000	
ONE Friday Fights 95	Kiamran Nabati	Eh Mwi	$10,000	
ONE Friday Fights 95	Robson De Oliveira	—	$10,000	
ONE 170	Tawanchai P.K.Saenchai	Fabrício Andrade	$50,000	
ONE 170	Nabil Anane	Sinsamut Klinmee	$50,000	
ONE Friday Fights 94	Akif Guluzada	Kritpet P.K.Saenchai	$10,000	
ONE Friday Fights 94	Kunsuek Mor.Krungthepthonburi	Petnaya BangsaenFightclub	$10,000	
ONE Friday Fights 94	Pentor SP.KansartPaeminburi	—	$10,000	
ONE Fight Night 27	Denice Zamboanga	Luke Lessei	$50,000	
ONE Friday Fights 93	Thway Lin Htet	Rocky Wor.Wantawee	$10,000	
ONE Friday Fights 93	Abdallah Ondash	Haruyuki Tanitsu	$10,000	
ONE Friday Fights 92	Suakim Sor.Jor.Tongprajin	—	$20,000	
ONE Friday Fights 92	Songchainoi Kiatsongrit	Egor Bikrev	$10,000	
ONE Friday Fights 92	Rak Erawan	Watcharapon P.K.Saenchai	$10,000	
ONE Friday Fights 92	Shimon Yoshinari	—	$10,000	
ONE Friday Fights 91	Freddie Haggerty	Padejsuk N.F.Looksuan	$10,000	
ONE Friday Fights 91	Lee Seung-chul	—	$10,000	
ONE Fight Night 26	Thongpoon P.K.Saenchai	Dante Leon	$50,000	
ONE Fight Night 26	Cole Abate	—	$50,000	
ONE Friday Fights 90	Antar Kacem	Asadulla Imangazaliev	$10,000	
ONE Friday Fights 90	Xavier Gonzalez	Alessio Malatesta	$10,000	
ONE Friday Fights 90	Ubaid Hussain	—	$10,000	
ONE Friday Fights 89	Tonglampoon FA.Group	Mungkorn Boomdeksean	$10,000	
ONE Friday Fights 89	Dionatha Santos Tobias	Lothong Kruaynaimuanggym	$10,000	
ONE Friday Fights 89	Pol Pascual	Rustam Yunusov	$10,000	
ONE Friday Fights 89	Marwin Quirante	—	$10,000	
ONE Friday Fights 88	Raksaensuk Sor.Tor.Hiewbangsaen	Abdelali Zahidi	$10,000	
ONE Friday Fights 88	Hiroki Naruo	Harlysson Nunes	$10,000	
ONE Friday Fights 87	Kongchai Chanaidonmuang	Chokpreecha P.K.Saenchai	$10,000	
ONE Friday Fights 87	Singdomthong Nokjeanladkrabang	Payaksurin Sit.JP	$10,000	
ONE Friday Fights 87	Marwin Dittrich	—	$10,000	
ONE 169	Kade Ruotolo	Marcus Buchecha	$50,000	
ONE 169	Ayaka Miura	—	$50,000	
ONE Friday Fights 86	Chatpichit Sor.Sor.Toipadriew	—	$20,000	
ONE Friday Fights 86	Egor Bikrev	Mahesuan Aekmuangnon	$10,000	
ONE Friday Fights 86	Nonthachai Jitmuangnon	—	$10,000	
ONE Friday Fights 85	Yodlekpet Or.Atchariya	Akif Guluzada	$10,000	
ONE Friday Fights 85	Toyota EagleMuaythai	Detchanan Wor.Wiangsa	$10,000	
ONE Friday Fights 85	Lekkla BS.MuayThai	George Jarvis	$10,000	
ONE Friday Fights 84	Muangthai P.K.Saenchai	Banluelok Sitwatcharachai	$10,000	
ONE Friday Fights 84	Kochasit Tasaeyasat	Phaham Gheirati	$10,000	
ONE Friday Fights 83	Panrit Lukjaomaesaiwaree	Mungkorn Boomdeksean	$10,000	
ONE Friday Fights 83	Hern N.F.Looksuan	—	$10,000	
ONE Fight Night 25	John Lineker	Johan Estupiñan	$50,000	
ONE Friday Fights 82	Denkriangkrai Singha Mawynn	Alessio Malatesta	$10,000	
ONE Friday Fights 82	Lucas Gabriel	—	$10,000	
ONE Friday Fights 81	Superbon Singha Mawynn	—	$50,000	
ONE Friday Fights 81	Sam-A Gaiyanghadao	Kulabdam Sor.Jor.Piek-U-Thai	$10,000	
ONE Friday Fights 80	Chartpayak Saksatoon	Teeyai Wankhongohm MBK	$10,000	
ONE Friday Fights 80	Lamnamkhong B.S.MuayThai	Petninmungkorn Dr.RatnamkaengIceland	$10,000	
ONE Friday Fights 79	Maemmot Sor.Salacheep	Isannuea Tor.Tanjaroen	$10,000	
ONE Friday Fights 79	Asadula Imagazaliev	Dzhabir Dzhabrailov	$10,000	
ONE 168	Superlek Kiatmuu9	Saeksan Or.Kwanmuang	$50,000	
ONE 168	John Lineker	Adrian Lee	$50,000	
ONE 168	Johan Ghazali	Johan Estupiñan	$50,000	
ONE Friday Fights 78	Fabio Reis	Tonglampoon F.A.Group	$10,000	
ONE Friday Fights 78	Yodkitti FiatPathum	Aslamjon Ortikov	$10,000	
ONE Friday Fights 78	Yota Shigemori	—	$10,000	
ONE Friday Fights 77	Rambong Sor.Therapat	Khundet P.K.Saenchai	$10,000	
ONE Friday Fights 77	Teeyai Wankhongohm MBK	Nehramit AnnyMuayThai	$10,000	
ONE Friday Fights 77	Omar Kinteh	—	$10,000	
ONE Friday Fights 76	Thway Lin Htet	Ganchai Jitmuangnon	$10,000	
ONE Friday Fights 76	Petchchakrit T.N.DiamondHome	Masatoshi Hirai	$10,000	
ONE Friday Fights 76	Eh Mwi	Korpai Sor.Yingcharoenkarnchang	$10,000	
ONE Friday Fights 75	Nuapetch Tded99	Petchnakian Phuyaiyunan	$10,000	
ONE Friday Fights 75	Mamuka Usubyan	—	$10,000	
ONE Friday Fights 74	Donking YotharakMuayThai	Sainatee P.K.Saenchai	$10,000	
ONE Friday Fights 74	Kirill Khomutov	Hiroyuki	$10,000	
ONE Fight Night 24	Mayssa Bastos	Elias Mahmoudi	$50,000	
ONE Fight Night 24	Aliff Sor.Dechapan	—	$50,000	
ONE Friday Fights 73	Xavier Gonzalez	Sanpetch Sor. Salacheep	$10,000	
ONE Friday Fights 73	Watcharapon Singha Mawynn	Toyota EagleMuayThai	$10,000	
ONE Friday Fights 73	Petchmai MC.SuperlekMuayThai	Sonrak Fairtex	$10,000	
ONE Friday Fights 73	Alfie Ponting	Fahjarat Sor.Dechapan	$10,000	
ONE Friday Fights 72	Petchnamkhong Mongkolpetch	Freddie Haggerty	$10,000	
ONE Friday Fights 71	Petchlamphun Muadablampang	Chartpayak Saksatoon	$10,000	
ONE Friday Fights 71	Yoddoi Kaewsamrit	Rifdean Masdor	$10,000	
ONE Friday Fights 71	Ilyas Musaev	Abdulla Dayakaev	$10,000	
ONE Friday Fights 71	Assadulah Imangazaliev	—	$10,000	
ONE Friday Fights 70	Stephen Irvine	Apidet FiatPathum	$10,000	
ONE Friday Fights 70	Tun Min Aung	Kendu Irving	$10,000	
ONE Fight Night 23	Nico Carrillo	—	$50,000	
ONE Friday Fights 69	Nabil Anane	Maisangkum Sor. Yingcharoenkarnchang	$10,000	
ONE Friday Fights 69	Sunday Boomdeksean	Soe Lin Oo	$10,000	
ONE Friday Fights 69	Ikko Ota	Avazbek Kholmirzaev	$10,000	
ONE Friday Fights 69	Katsuaki Aoyagi	—	$10,000	
ONE Friday Fights 68	Kiamran Nabati	Pakorn P.K.Saenchai	$10,000	
ONE Friday Fights 68	Suriyanlek Por.Yenying	—	$10,000	
ONE Friday Fights 67	Nakrob Fairtex	Samingdam Looksuan	$10,000	
ONE Friday Fights 67	Tonglampoon FA.Group	Otis Waghorn	$10,000	
ONE Friday Fights 67	Haruyuki Tanitsu	—	$10,000	
ONE 167	Mikey Musumeci	Kade Ruotolo	$10,000	
ONE 167	Adrian Lee	—	$10,000	
ONE Friday Fights 66	Akram Hamidi	Kaotaem Fairtex	$10,000	
ONE Friday Fights 66	Yod-IQ Or.Primonsri	Miao Aoqi	$10,000	
ONE Friday Fights 65	Jaosuayai Mor.Krungthepthonburi	Watcharaphon P.K.Saenchai	$10,000	
ONE Friday Fights 65	Tahaneak Nayokathasala	Samransing Sitchalongsak	$10,000	
ONE Friday Fights 65	Carlo Bumina-ang	—	$10,000	
ONE Friday Fights 64	Parham Gheirati	Petchninmungkorn CaptainKaneBoxing	$10,000	
ONE Friday Fights 64	Teeyai P.K.Saenchai	Johan Estupiñan	$10,000	
ONE Friday Fights 64	Satoshi Katashima	Shoya Ishiguro	$10,000	
ONE Friday Fights 63	Sanpetch Sor.Salacheep	Patakake SinbiMuayThai	$10,000	
ONE Friday Fights 63	Chartpayak Saksatoon	Gregor Thom	$10,000	
ONE Friday Fights 63	David Cooke	—	$10,000	
ONE Friday Fights 62	Chokpreecha P.K.Saenchai	Kongkula Jitmuangon	$10,000	
ONE Friday Fights 62	Yuki Morioka	—	$10,000	
ONE Fight Night 22	Akbar Abdullaev	—	$50,000	
ONE Friday Fights 61	Petchpattaya SilkMuayThai	Petchnakian Phuyaiyunan	$10,000	
ONE Friday Fights 61	Muga Seto	—	$10,000	
ONE Friday Fights 60	Suriyanlek Por.Yenying	Rittidet Sor.Sommai	$10,000	
ONE Friday Fights 60	Focus Adsanpatong	Kaoklai Chor.Hapayak	$10,000	
ONE Friday Fights 60	Yodnumchai Fairtex	Detchphupa ChotBangsaen	$10,000	
ONE Friday Fights 60	Suakim SorJor.Tongprachin	Panmongkol CMA.Academy	$10,000	
ONE Friday Fights 59	Yamin P.K.Saenchai	Pettasuea Seeopal	$10,000	
ONE Friday Fights 59	Yodkitti FiatPathumThani	Takuma Ota	$10,000	
ONE Friday Fights 59	Yuki Kasahara	—	$10,000	
ONE Fight Night 21	Tye Ruotolo	Ben Tynan	$50,000	
ONE Fight Night 21	Kade Ruotolo	—	$50,000	
ONE Friday Fights 58	Nakrob Fairtex	Muangthai P.K.Saenchai	$10,000	
ONE Friday Fights 58	Shadow Singmawynn (x2)	—	$10,000	
ONE Friday Fights 57	Sungprab Lukpichit	Parham Gheirati	$10,000	
ONE Friday Fights 57	Moe Htet Aung	Tran Quac Tuan	$10,000	
ONE Friday Fights 56	Jelte Blommaert	Tonglampoon FA.Group	$10,000	
ONE Friday Fights 56	Prakaipetchlek EminentAir	Furkan Karabağ	$10,000	
ONE Friday Fights 56	Rak Erawan	Rifdean Masdor	$10,000	
ONE Friday Fights 56	Sonrak Fairtex	Kaenlek Sor.Chokmeechai	$10,000	
ONE Friday Fights 55	Rittidet Sor.Sommai	Bhumjaithai Mor.Tor.1	$10,000	
ONE Friday Fights 55	Chalarmdan Sor.Boonmeerit	Natalia Diachkova	$10,000	
ONE Friday Fights 55	Ryota Koshimizu	—	$10,000	
ONE Fight Night 20	—	—		
ONE Friday Fights 54	Yoddoi Kaewsamrit	Petchlampun Muadablampang	$10,000	
ONE 166	Anatoly Malykhin	Tang Kai	$50,000	
ONE Friday Fights 53	Kongsuk Fairtex	Sunday Boomdeksian	$10,000	
ONE Friday Fights 53	Mahesuan Ekmuangnon	Huo Xiaolong	$10,000	
ONE Friday Fights 53	Deniz Demirkapu	—	$10,000	
ONE Fight Night 19	Jonathan Haggerty	Saemapetch Fairtex	$50,000	
ONE Fight Night 19	Martyna Kierczyńska	Thongpoon P.K.Saenchai	$50,000	
ONE Friday Fights 52	Kulabdam Sor.Jor.Piek-U-Thai	Chalawan Ngorbangkapi	$10,000	
ONE Friday Fights 52	Petchpattaya SilkMuayThai	Jongangsuek Sor.Thepsutin	$10,000	
ONE Friday Fights 52	Yodtongthai Sor.Sommai	Thant Zin	$10,000	
ONE Friday Fights 52	Soe Lin Oo	Luepong Kaewsamrit	$10,000	
ONE Friday Fights 51	Wanpadet Looksuan	Avatar P.K.Saenchai	$10,000	
ONE Friday Fights 50	Panrit Lukjaomaesaiwaree	Petchsaenchai M.U.Den KhonmaiBaowee	$10,000	
ONE Friday Fights 50	Win Sitjaynim	Ricardo Bravo	$10,000	
ONE Friday Fights 50	Carlo Bumina-ang	—	$10,000	
ONE 165	Superlek Kiatmuu9	Kade Ruotolo	$50,000	
ONE 165	Shinya Aoki	Nieky Holzken	$50,000	
ONE 165	Marat Grigorian	Garry Tonon	$50,000	
ONE Friday Fights 49	Nakrob Fairtex	Abdallah Ondash	$10,000	
ONE Friday Fights 49	Khunponnoi Sor.Sommai	Kaimookkao Wor.Jakrawut	$10,000	
ONE Friday Fights 49	Freddie Haggerty	Ramadan Ondash	$10,000	
ONE Friday Fights 48	Kongthoranee Sor.Sommai	Sornsueknoi FA Group	$10,000	
ONE Friday Fights 48	Kwanjai KwanjaiMuayThaiGym	Joachim Ouraghi	$10,000	
ONE Friday Fights 48	Majid Karimi	—	$10,000	
ONE Fight Night 18	Kwon Won-il	Rungrawee Sitsongpeenong	$50,000	
ONE Friday Fights 47	Alexey Balyko	Kompetch Fairtex	$10,000	
ONE Friday Fights 47	Khunsuk Sor.Dechapan	Numpangna EagleMuayThai	$10,000	
ONE Friday Fights 47	Apiwat Sor.Somnuk	—	$10,000	
ONE Friday Fights 46	Prajanchai P.K.Saenchai	—	$50,000	
ONE Friday Fights 46	Kulabdam Sor.Jor.Piek-U-Thai	Jaosuayai Sor.Dechapan	$10,000	
ONE Friday Fights 46	Phetsukumvit Boybangna	Suablack Tor.Pran49	$10,000	
ONE Friday Fights 46	Chorfah Tor.Sangtiennoi	Suriyanlek Por.Yenying	$10,000	
ONE Friday Fights 45	Soner Şen	Chartpayak Saksatun	$10,000	
ONE Friday Fights 45	Pettasuea Seeopal	Charlie Singha Mawynn	$10,000	
ONE Friday Fights 45	Furkan Karabağ	—	$10,000	
ONE Fight Night 17	Roman Kryklia	Dmitry Menshikov	$50,000	
ONE Fight Night 17	Jacob Smith	—	$50,000	
ONE Friday Fights 44	Pompetch P.K.Saenchai	Maisangkum Sor. Yingcharoenkarnchang	$10,000	
ONE Friday Fights 44	Ganchai Jitmuangnon	Sungprab Lookpichit	$10,000	
ONE Friday Fights 43	Kongthoranee Sor.Sommai	Petchnamkhong Mongkolpetch	$10,000	
ONE Friday Fights 43	Aslamjon Ortikov	Mustafa Al Tekreeti	$10,000	
ONE Friday Fights 42	Khunponnoi Sor.Sommai	Sornsueknoi FA Group	$10,000	
ONE Friday Fights 42	Kongkairop FiatPathum	Yu Yau Pui	$10,000	
ONE Friday Fights 41	Nakrob Fairtex	Songchainoi Kiatsongrit	$10,000	
ONE Friday Fights 41	Suriyanlek Por.Yenying	Parnpet Sor.Jor.Lekmuangnon	$10,000	
ONE Friday Fights 41	Yodnumchai Fairtex	—	$10,000	
ONE Friday Fights 40	Jaosuayai Sor.Dechapan	Aliff Sor.Dechapan	$10,000	
ONE Friday Fights 40	Khunsuk Sor.Dechapan	Ricardo Bravo	$10,000	
ONE Friday Fights 40	Parham Gheiratimarkeye	—	$10,000	
ONE Fight Night 16	Jonathan Haggerty	—	$100,000	
ONE Fight Night 16	Tye Ruotolo	Ben Tynan	$50,000	
ONE Fight Night 16	Cristina Morales	—	$50,000	
ONE Friday Fights 39	Soner Şen	ET Tded99	$10,000	
ONE Friday Fights 39	Jack Jackmuaythai Gym	Nongchamp Luckybantermg	$10,000	
ONE Friday Fights 39	Amnuaydet Wor.Wantawee	Longern Paesaisee	$10,000	
ONE Friday Fights 38	Ilyas Musaev	Puengluang Baanramba	$10,000	
ONE Friday Fights 38	Petchgarfield Jitmuangnon	Numpangna EagleMuayThai	$10,000	
ONE Friday Fights 38	Yodsingdam Kiatkamthorn	Lenny Blasi	$10,000	
ONE Friday Fights 38	Fritz Aldin Biagtan	—	$10,000	
ONE Friday Fights 37	Rittidet Sor.Sommai	Lamnamkhong BS.MuayThai	$10,000	
ONE Friday Fights 37	Kaoklai Chor.Hapayak	Elyes Kacem	$10,000	
ONE Fight Night 15	Thanh Le	Mikey Musumeci	$50,000	
ONE Fight Night 15	Zhang Lipeng	—	$50,000	
ONE Friday Fights 36	Rambong Sor.Therapat	Petchdam Petchkiatpetch	$10,000	
ONE Friday Fights 36	Petchsaenchai MUden-Khonmaibawwee	Johan Ghazali	$10,000	
ONE Friday Fights 36	Kirill Khomutov	—	$10,000	
ONE Fight Night 14	Stamp Fairtex	Smilla Sundell	$50,000	
ONE Fight Night 14	Asa Ten Pow	—	$50,000	
ONE Friday Fights 35	Black Panther	Suriyanlek Por.Yenying	$10,000	
ONE Friday Fights 35	Batman Or.Atchariya	Sakaengam Jitmuangnon	$10,000	
ONE Friday Fights 35	Phetchumpae Highland Gym	—	$10,000	
ONE Friday Fights 34	Suakim Sor.Jor.Tongprajin	—	$20,000	
ONE Friday Fights 34	Muangthai P.K.Saenchai	Yodlekpet Or. Atchariya	$10,000	
ONE Friday Fights 34	Miguel Trindade	Songchainoi Kiatsongrit	$10,000	
ONE Friday Fights 33	Tubtimthong Sor.Jor.Lekmuangnon	Yodnumchai Fairtex	$10,000	
ONE Friday Fights 33	Otop Or.Kwanmuang	Yamin P.K.Saenchai	$10,000	
ONE Friday Fights 32	Nabil Anane	Suablack Tor.Pran49	$10,000	
ONE Friday Fights 32	Rhuam Felipe Morais Caldas	—	$10,000	
ONE Friday Fights 31	Chorfah Tor.Sangtiennoi	Sibsan Nokkhao KorMor11	$10,000	
ONE Friday Fights 31	Sornsueknoi FA Group	Alaverdi Ramazanov	$10,000	
ONE Friday Fights 30	Worapon Paidong	Kongklai AnnyMuayThai	$20,000	
ONE Friday Fights 30	Saemapetch Fairtex	Aliff Sor.Dechapan	$10,000	
ONE Friday Fights 30	Songchainoi Kiatsongrit	Chatanan Sor.Jor.Joyprajin	$10,000	
ONE Friday Fights 30	Chalawan Ngorbangkapi	Kaoklai Chor.Hapayak	$10,000	
ONE Friday Fights 30	Eisaku Ogasawara	Ricardo Bravo	$10,000	
ONE Friday Fights 30	Petchgarfield Jitmuangnon	Sho Ogawa	$10,000	
ONE Friday Fights 30	Gadzhimurad Amirzhanov	—	$10,000	
ONE Friday Fights 29	Saeksan Or. Kwanmuang	Rambong Sor.Therapat	$10,000	
ONE Friday Fights 28	Suriyanlek Por.Yenying	Antar Kacem	$10,000	
ONE Friday Fights 28	Chanajon PK.Saenchai	Suablack Tor.Pran49	$10,000	
ONE Fight Night 13	Mikey Musumeci	Tawanchai P.K.Saenchai	$50,000	
ONE Fight Night 13	Oumar Kane	Tye Ruotolo	$50,000	
ONE Fight Night 13	Enkh-Orgil Baatarkhuu	—	$50,000	
ONE Friday Fights 27	Tyson Harrison	Chai SorSor.Toipadriew	$10,000	
ONE Friday Fights 27	Prajanban Sor.Jor.Wichitpadriew	Khunsuk Sor.Dechapan	$10,000	
ONE Friday Fights 27	Zhang Jinhu	Abdallah Ondash	$10,000	
ONE Friday Fights 26	Kirill Khomutov	Puengluang Baanramba	$10,000	
ONE Friday Fights 26	Petchdam Petchkiatpetch	Mohammad Siasarani	$10,000	
ONE Fight Night 12	Garry Tonon	Amir Aliakbari	$50,000	
ONE Fight Night 12	Akbar Abdullaev	Phetjeeja Lukjaoporongtom	$50,000	
ONE Fight Night 12	Bogdan Shumarov	—	$50,000	
ONE Friday Fights 25	Nakrob Fairtex	Watcharapon Singha Mawynn	$10,000	
ONE Friday Fights 25	Suriyanlek Por.Yenying	Kaoklai Chor.Hapayak	$10,000	
ONE Friday Fights 25	Kabilan Jalivan	—	$10,000	
ONE Friday Fights 24	Aliff Sor.Dechapan	Sinsamut Klinmee	$10,000	
ONE Friday Fights 24	Amir Abdulmuslimov	Nongam Fairtex	$10,000	
ONE Friday Fights 23	Kongklai AnnyMuayThai	Stephen Irvine	$10,000	
ONE Friday Fights 23	Songchainoi Kiatsongrit	Chayan Oorzhak	$10,000	
ONE Friday Fights 22	Prajanchai P.K.Saenchai	Superlek Kiatmuu9	$50,000	
ONE Friday Fights 22	Anatoly Malykhin	—	$50,000	
ONE Friday Fights 22	Saeksan Or. Kwanmuang	—	$20,000	
ONE Friday Fights 22	Nico Carrillo	Kongthoranee Sor.Sommai	$10,000	
ONE Friday Fights 22	Akram Hamidi	Thongpoon P.K.Saenchai	$10,000	
ONE Friday Fights 22	Yangdam Sor.Tor.Hiewbangsaen	—	$10,000	
ONE Friday Fights 21	Mongkolkaew Sor.Sommai	Jack Apichat MuayThai	$10,000	
ONE Friday Fights 21	Seksan Fairtex	Dabdam Por.Tor.Tor.Thongtawee	$10,000	
ONE Friday Fights 21	Xavier Gonzalez	—	$10,000	
ONE Fight Night 11	Regian Eersel	Ilya Freymanov	$50,000	
ONE Fight Night 11	Superbon Singha Mawynn	Kwon Won Il	$50,000	
ONE Friday Fights 20	Jaosuayai Sor.Dechaphan	Suablack Tor.Pran49	$10,000	
ONE Friday Fights 20	Rambong Sor.Terapat	Jaising Sitnayokpunsak	$10,000	
ONE Friday Fights 20	Torepchi Dongak	—	$10,000	
ONE Friday Fights 19	Rittidet Sor.Sommai	KohTao Petsomnuk	$10,000	
ONE Friday Fights 19	Ferzan Çiçek	—	$10,000	
ONE Friday Fights 18	Teeyai P.K.Saenchai	—	$20,000	
ONE Friday Fights 18	Pongsiri P.K.Saenchai	Tyson Harrison	$10,000	
ONE Friday Fights 18	Rit Kaewsamrit	ChatAnan Sor.Jor.JoyPrajin	$10,000	
ONE Friday Fights 18	Petnumkhum Phundakrataburi	Johan Ghazali	$10,000	
ONE Friday Fights 17	Pompetch P.K.Saenchai	Avatar P.K.Saenchai	$10,000	
ONE Friday Fights 17	Rak Erawan	Rachan Sor.Somnuk	$10,000	
ONE Friday Fights 17	Maisangkum Sor.Yingcharoenkarnchang	Yodlekpet Or. Atchariya	$10,000	
ONE Friday Fights 17	Jelte Blommaert	Ivan Parshikov	$10,000	
ONE Friday Fights 17	Enkh-Orgil Baatarkhuu	—	$10,000	
ONE Friday Fights 16	Phetjeeja Lukjaoporongtom	Samurai Seeopal	$10,000	
ONE Friday Fights 16	Sulaiman Looksuan	Yodphupa Wimanair	$10,000	
ONE Friday Fights 16	Huo Xiaolong	Numpangna Eaglemuaythai	$10,000	
ONE Fight Night 10	Rodtang Jitmuangnon		$100,000	
ONE Fight Night 10	Mikey Musumeci	Stamp Fairtex	$50,000	
ONE Fight Night 10	Zebaztian Kadestam	Sage Northcutt	$50,000	
ONE Friday Fights 15	Chokdee Maxjandee	Jaising Sitnayokpunsak	$10,000	
ONE Friday Fights 15	Fabio Reis	—	$10,000	
ONE Friday Fights 14	Gingsanglek Tor.Laksong	Kongchai Chanaidonmuang	$10,000	
ONE Friday Fights 14	Xavier Gonzalez	Chatpichit SorSor.Toipadriew	$10,000	
ONE Friday Fights 14	Sakaengam Jitmuangnon	Saeksan Or. Kwanmuang	$10,000	
ONE Fight Night 9	Jonathan Haggerty	Felipe Lobo	$50,000	
ONE Fight Night 9	Isi Fitikefu	Jhanlo Mark Sangiao	$50,000	
ONE Friday Fights 13	Thongpoon P.K.Saenchai	Natalia Diachkova	$10,000	
ONE Friday Fights 13	Aliff Sor Dechapan	Nico Carrillo	$10,000	
ONE Friday Fights 12	Dentungtong Singha Mawynn	Tubtimthong Sor.Jor.Lekmuangnon	$10,000	
ONE Friday Fights 12	Zeta Chor.Chokamnuay	Samingdam Looksuan	$10,000	
ONE Friday Fights 11	ET Tded99	Pongsiri Sor.Jor.Wichitpadriew	$10,000	
ONE Friday Fights 11	Tyson Harrison	Rambo Mor.Rattanabandit	$10,000	
ONE Fight Night 8	Superlek Kiatmuu9	Akbar Abdullaev	$50,000	
ONE Fight Night 8	Zhang Peimian	—	$50,000	
ONE Friday Fights 10	Thepthaksin Sor.Sornsing	Rak Erawan	$10,000	
ONE Friday Fights 10	Thongpoon P.K.Saenchai	Yod-IQ P.K.Saenchai	$10,000	
ONE Friday Fights 9	Regian Eersel	—	$50,000	
ONE Friday Fights 9	Muangthai P.K.Saenchai	Sam-A Gaiyanghadao	$10,000	
ONE Friday Fights 9	Sulaiman Looksuan	Saeksan Or. Kwanmuang	$10,000	
ONE Friday Fights 9	Silviu Vitez	Yodlekpet Or. Pitisak	$10,000	
ONE Friday Fights 9	Tagir Khalilov	—	$10,000	
ONE Friday Fights 8	Petsukumvit Boibangna	Petlampun Muadablampang	$10,000	
ONE Friday Fights 8	Numsurin Chor.Ketwina	Banluerit Or.Atchariya	$10,000	
ONE Friday Fights 8	Maisangkum Sor. Yingcharoenkarnchang	Jomhod AutoMuayThai	$10,000	
ONE Friday Fights 7	Rambolek Chor.Ajalaboon	Samingdam Chor.Ajalaboon	$10,000	
ONE Friday Fights 7	Lisa Brierley	—	$10,000	
ONE Fight Night 7	Tawanchai P.K.Saenchai	Tommy Langaker	$50,000	
ONE Friday Fights 6	Kongthoranee Sor.Sommai	Johan Ghazali	$10,000	
ONE Friday Fights 6	Bogdan Shumarov	Celest Hansen	$10,000	
ONE Friday Fights 5	Superball Tded99	Kongklai AnnyMuayThai	$10,000	
ONE Friday Fights 5	Namphongnoi Sor.Sommai	Teeyai P.K.Saenchai	$10,000	
ONE Friday Fights 5	Khunsuk Sor.Dechapan	Furkan Karabağ	$10,000	
ONE Friday Fights 4	Erdem Taha Dincer	Francisca Vera	$10,000	
ONE Friday Fights 4	Chaongoh Jitmuangnon	Fabio Reis	$10,000	
ONE Friday Fights 3	Elbrus Amirkhanovich	Kongchai Chanaidonmuang	$10,000	
ONE Friday Fights 3	Ilyas Musaev	Yu Yau Pui	$10,000	
ONE Friday Fights 3	Shannon Wiratchai	Alisson Barbosa	$10,000	
ONE Friday Fights 2	Yodlekpet Or. Pitisak	—	$10,000	
ONE Friday Fights 1	Nong-O Gaiyanghadao	Saeksan Or. Kwanmuang	$50,000	
ONE Friday Fights 1	Sakaengam Jitmuangnon	Muangthai P.K.Saenchai	$10,000	
ONE Fight Night 6	Chingiz Allazov	Aung La Nsang	$50,000	
ONE Fight Night 6	Stamp Fairtex	Anna Jaroonsak	$50,000	
ONE 164	Jeremy Pacatiw	Jhanlo Mark Sangiao	$50,000	
ONE 164	Tagir Khalilov	—	$50,000	
ONE on Prime Video 5	Anatoly Malykhin		$100,000	
ONE on Prime Video 5	Edson Marques	Tye Ruotolo	$50,000	
ONE 163	Roman Kryklia	Saygid Izagakhmaev	$50,000	
ONE 163	Woo Sung Hoon	Bianca Basílio	$50,000	
ONE on Prime Video 4	Christian Lee	Cosmo Alexandre	$50,000	
ONE on Prime Video 4	Danielle Kelly	—	$50,000	
ONE on Prime Video 3	Kade Ruotolo	Shamil Gasanov	$50,000	
ONE on Prime Video 3	Mehdi Zatout	Noelle Grandjean	$50,000	
ONE 162	Eko Roni Saputra	—	$50,000	
ONE on Prime Video 2	Ilya Freymanov	Halil Amir	$50,000	
ONE 161	Roman Kryklia	Tiffany Teo	$50,000	
ONE 161	Rodrigo Marello	—	$50,000	
ONE on Prime Video 1	Demetrious Johnson	Nong-O Gaiyanghadao	$50,000	
ONE on Prime Video 1	Marcus Almeida	Panpayak Jitmuangnon	$50,000	
ONE on Prime Video 1	Superlek Kiatmuu9	—	$50,000	
ONE 160	Christian Lee	Saemapetch Fairtex	$50,000	
ONE 160	Martin Batur	Tommy Langaker	$50,000	
ONE 159	Reinier de Ridder	Danial Williams	$50,000	
ONE 159	Sinsamut Klinmee	—	$50,000	
ONE 158	Tawanchai P.K.Saenchai	Fabrício Andrade	$50,000	
ONE 158	Alex Silva	—	$50,000	
ONE 157	Petchmorakot Petchyindee	Joseph Lasiri	$50,000	
ONE 157	Rodtang Jitmuangnon	Tye Ruotolo	$50,000	
ONE 156	Liam Harrison		$100,000	
ONE 156	Regian Eersel	Smilla Sundell	$50,000	
ONE 156	Mikey Musumeci	—	$50,000	
ONE: X	Angela Lee	Yoshihiro Akiyama	$50,000	
ONE: X	John Wayne Parr	Hiroki Akimoto	$50,000	
ONE: X	Tang Kai	Sinsamut Klinmee	$50,000	
ONE: X	Kang Ji Won	Danielle Kelly	$50,000	
ONE: Lights Out	Thanh Le	John Lineker	$50,000	
ONE: Lights Out	Zhang Peimian	Iman Barlow	$50,000	
ONE: Lights Out	Liam Nolan	—	$50,000	
ONE: Full Circle	Reinier de Ridder	Roman Kryklia	$50,000	
ONE: Bad Blood	Anatoly Malykhin		$100,000	
ONE: Bad Blood	Jonathan Haggerty	Woo Sung Hoon	$50,000	
ONE: Only the Brave	Chingiz Allazov	Rade Opačić	$50,000	
ONE: Only the Brave	Zhang Lipeng	—	$50,000	
ONE: Heavy Hitters	Saygid Izagakhmaev	Ekaterina Vandaryeva	$50,000	
ONE: Heavy Hitters	Senzo Ikeda	—	$50,000	
ONE: Winter Warriors	Dagi Arslanaliev	Timofey Nastyukhin	$50,000	
