= Oumar Kane =

Senegalese mixed martial artist

- Born: March 14, 1992 (age 34); Thiaroye, Senegal
- Other names: Reug Reug
- Nationality: Senegalese; French
- Height: 6 ft 0 in (1.83 m)
- Weight: 258 lb (117 kg)
- Reach: 78 in (198 cm)
- Style: Senegalese Wrestling
- Fighting out of: Dakar, Senegal
- Team: TRIPL3 MMA; Black Panther Sports
- Years active: 2019–present

Kickboxing record
- Total: 1
- Wins: 1
- By knockout: 1

Mixed martial arts record
- Total: 9
- Wins: 7
- By knockout: 4
- By decision: 3
- Losses: 2
- By knockout: 2

Other information
- Mixed martial arts record from Sherdog

Oumar Kane, also known as Reug Reug (born March 14, 1992) is a Senegalese-French professional mixed martial artist and wrestler who competes in the heavyweight division. He previously fought in ONE Championship, where he was the former Heavyweight World Champion.

== Early life and education ==
Kane was raised in Thiaroye sur Mer, a small town outside Dakar. At age 16, Kane started to practice mbapatte, a traditional folk wrestling style of the Serer people. Kane moved to France and holds French citizenship.

== Mixed martial arts career ==
=== ONE Championship ===
Kane made his promotional debut against Alain Ngalani on January 22, 2021, and aired on January 29, 2021, at ONE: Unbreakable 2. He won the fight via technical knockout in the first round.

Kane was scheduled to face Mehdi Barghi on April 7, 2021, at ONE on TNT 1. However, Barghi pulled out due to health and safety protocols. Patrick Schmid, who scheduled to face Rade Opačić in a kickboxing bout replaced to meet in a MMA bout. He won the fight via technical knockout in the first round.

Kane faced Kirill Grishinko on April 28, 2021, at ONE on TNT 4. Just as the bell sounded in round two, Grishenko landed a throat punch. Kane seemed to protest what might have been considered a late blow, then dropped to his knees holding his throat. He did not get back up, and was unable to answer the bell for round three. He lost by TKO in round two.

Kane was scheduled to face Marcus Buchecha on April 22, 2022, at ONE 156. However at the week of the event, it was announced that the bout would be moved to ONE 157 on May 20, 2022. In turn, Kane withdrew from the bout citing injury and was replaced by Hugo Cunha.

Kane faced Batradz Gazzaev on September 29, 2022, at ONE 161. He won the fight via technical knockout in round two.

Kane was scheduled to face Jasur Mirzamukhamedov on December 3, 2022, at ONE 164. However, the bout was relocated at ONE on Prime Video 5 at this same day. He won the fight via unanimous decision. On January 6, 2023, it was announced that Mirzamukhamedov has been suspended from competing in MMA for six months under ONE drug testing programme guidelines and he was release from promotion.

Kane faced Marcus Buchecha on August 5, 2023, at ONE Fight Night 13. He won the fight via unanimous decision and this win earned the Performance of the Night bonuses.

Kane faced Anatoly Malykhin for the ONE Heavyweight World Championship on November 9, 2024, at ONE 169. He won the title via split decision.

Kane was scheduled to defend his heavyweight title in a rematch against Anatoly Malykhin on November 16, 2025, at ONE 173. However, Kane was forced to withdraw from the bout due to being involved in a car accident.

Kane rematched Anatoly Malykhin on May 15, 2026 at ONE Friday Fights 154, losing the bout and his title by knockout in the fourth round.

== Kickboxing career ==
Kane made his kickboxing debut against Senegalese influencer "Boucher Ketchup" Mamadou Kamara on July 6, 2024, at ONE Fight Night 23. He won the fight via knockout in the first round.

== Championship and accomplishments ==
- ONE Championship
  - ONE Heavyweight World Championship (One time)
  - Performance of the Night (One time) vs. Marcus Almeida
  - Most wins in the Heavyweight MMA division (6)
  - 2024: Breakout Star of the Year
- MMA Junkie
  - 2024 Upset of the Year vs. Anatoly Malykhin at ONE 169

== Mixed martial arts record ==
Professional record breakdown
9 matches	7 wins	2 losses
By knockout	4	2
By decision	3	0

Res.	Record	Opponent	Method	Event	Date	Round	Time	Location	Notes
Loss	7–2	Anatoly Malykhin	KO (punches)	ONE: The Inner Circle 14	May 15, 2026	4	1:54	Bangkok, Thailand	Lost the ONE Heavyweight Championship.
Win	7–1	Anatoly Malykhin	Decision (split)	ONE 169	November 9, 2024	5	5:00	Bangkok, Thailand	Won the ONE Heavyweight Championship.
Win	6–1	Marcus Almeida	Decision (unanimous)	ONE Fight Night 13	August 5, 2023	3	5:00	Bangkok, Thailand	Performance of the Night.
Win	5–1	Jasur Mirzamukhamedov	Decision (unanimous)	ONE on Prime Video 5	December 3, 2022	3	5:00	Pasay, Philippines	Mirzamukhamedov tested positive for banned substance.
Win	4–1	Batradz Gazzaev	TKO (punches)	ONE 161	September 29, 2022	2	2:15	Kallang, Singapore	
Loss	3–1	Kirill Grishenko	TKO (retirement)	ONE on TNT 4	April 28, 2021	2	5:00	Kallang, Singapore	
Win	3–0	Patrick Schmid	TKO (punches)	ONE on TNT 1	April 7, 2021	1	1:48	Kallang, Singapore	
Win	2–0	Alain Ngalani	TKO (punches)	ONE: Unbreakable 2	January 22, 2021	1	4:32	Kallang, Singapore	
Win	1–0	Sofiane Boukichou	TKO (punches)	Ares FC 1	December 14, 2019	2	1:20	Dakar, Senegal	Heavyweight debut.

== Muay Thai record ==
Muay Thai Record
1 Wins, 0 Losses, 0 Draw
Date	Result	Opponent	Event	Location	Method	Round	Time
2024-07-06	Win	(Senegal) Mamadou Kamara	ONE Fight Night 23	Bangkok, Thailand	KO (punches)	1	2:08
Legend: Win Loss Draw/No contest Notes

== See also ==
- List of male mixed martial artists
