= Marcus Buchecha =

Brazilian Jiu-Jitsu practitioner and mixed martial artist (born 1990)

Marcus Almeida
- Born: Marcus Vinícius Oliveira de Almeida; January 8, 1990 (age 36); Santos, São Paulo, Brazil
- Other names: Buchecha
- Height: 6 ft 3 in (191 cm)
- Weight: 253 lb (115 kg; 18 st 1 lb)
- Division: Heavyweight
- Reach: 77.5 in (197 cm)
- Style: Brazilian Jiu-Jitsu
- Team: Checkmat; American Kickboxing Academy (2014–present); American Top Team (2020–present)
- Rank: 4th deg. BJJ black belt
- Years active: 2011–present

Mixed martial arts record
- Total: 9
- Wins: 5
- By knockout: 1
- By submission: 4
- Losses: 3
- By knockout: 1
- By decision: 2
- Draws: 1

Other information
- Mixed martial arts record from Sherdog

Marcus Vinícius Oliveira de Almeida, also known as Buchecha (born January 8, 1990) is a Brazilian professional mixed martial artist and 4th-degree black belt Brazilian jiu-jitsu (BJJ) practitioner. (Note: under Rodrigo Cavaca) A professional mixed martial artist since 2020, he currently competes in the Heavyweight division of the Ultimate Fighting Championship (UFC). He formerly competed in the heavyweight division of ONE Championship.

A multiple-time World jiu-jitsu and ADCC submission fighting champion, Buchecha is a member of the IBJJF Hall of Fame and widely considered as one of the greatest Brazilian jiu-jitsu competitors of all time.

== Early life ==
Almeida was born and grew up in Santos, São Paulo. His sister started training Brazilian jiu-jitsu when Marcus was 14 years old, forcing him to come along to the gym so their father Clayton could keep an eye on her. Subsequently, Marcus and Clayton started training jiu-jitsu also, leading both to become black belts and the latter winning IBJJF Masters World Championship. Almeida is a black belt under Rodrigo Cavaca, who gave Almeida his nickname Buchecha, which means cheek and is a reference to him having chubby cheeks when he was overweight. Almeida competes under the Checkmat team.

== Mixed martial arts career ==
=== ONE Championship ===
Despite talking about transitioning to mixed martial arts since 2015, news surfaced four years later on July 30, 2020, that Almeida had signed a multi-year contract with ONE Championship. He has been training mixed martial arts at the American Kickboxing Academy and has competed in the heavyweight division.

In August 2020, Almeida had to withdraw from an upcoming BJJ match with Fabrício Werdum due to a knee injury that has also delayed his MMA debut for ONE FC. Almeida was scheduled to make his MMA debut against Oumar Kane at ONE Championship. Unfortunately, Almeida was removed from the card and replaced with Alain Ngalani on 13 January 2021, reportedly due to suffering an injury in training. After recovering from his injury, he was booked to make his MMA debut against Kang Ji-Won at ONE on TNT 1. Kang later withdrew from the bout for undisclosed reasons.

Almeida was scheduled to face Thomas Narmo at ONE Championship: Revolution on September 24, 2021. Narmo later withdrew for undisclosed reasons, and was replaced by Anderson “Braddock” Silva. He won the bout in the first round via north–south choke.

Almeida faced Kang Ji Won at ONE: Winter Warriors on December 3, 2021. He won the bout via rear-naked choke in the first round.

Almeida was scheduled to face Oumar "Reug Reug" Kane on April 22, 2022, at ONE 156. However, the week of the event, it was announced that the bout would be moved to May 20. Yet, Kane withdrew from the bout citing injury and was replaced by Hugo Cunha who in turn tested positive for COVID-19 and the bout was scrapped. Almeida was later rescheduled to face Simon Carson at ONE 158 on June 3, 2022. He won the fight by a first-round technical knockout, stopping Carson with ground and pound midway through the opening round.

Almeida faced Kirill Grishenko at ONE on Prime Video 1 on August 27, 2022. He won the bout early in the first round after submmiting Kirill with a heel hook. This win earned him the Performance of the Night award.

Almeida faced Oumar Kane on August 5, 2023, at ONE Fight Night 13. He lost the fight by unanimous decision.

A biopic entitled Buchecha: Far Beyond World Records was released in 2023.

Almeida faced Amir Aliakbari on November 9, 2024, at ONE 169. He won the fight by submission in the first round and earned a $50,000 ‘Performance of the Night’ bonus. This was the final fight of Almeida's contract, and he became a free agent after it.

=== Ultimate Fighting Championship ===
On July 7, 2025, it was reported that Almeida had signed with Ultimate Fighting Championship; he made his promotional debut against Martin Buday on July 26, 2025, at UFC on ABC 9. He lost the fight by unanimous decision.

Almeida faced Kennedy Nzechukwu on December 13, 2025, at UFC on ESPN 73. Despite Nzechukwu being deducted one point due to an eye poke, the bout ended via unanimous draw.

Almeida was scheduled to face Max Gimenis on April 25, 2026 at UFC Fight Night 274. However, Gimenis withdrew because of a broken foot and was replaced by former LFA Light Heavyweight Champion Ryan Spann. He lost the fight via knockout in round two.

== Championships and accomplishments ==
=== Brazilian jiu-jitsu / Submission wrestling ===
Main Achievements (Black Belt):

- ADCC Submission Fighting World Champion (2013 / 2017)
- IBJJF World Champion (2012 (Note: Weight and Absolute) / 2013 / 2014 / 2016 / 2017 / 2018 / 2019)
- IBJJF World No-Gi Champion (2010 / 2011)
- IBJJF Pan Champion (2012**)
- IBJJF Pro League Grand Prix Champion (2016)
- UAEJJF Abu Dhabi Pro Champion (2012 (Note: Absolute) / 2013 / 2014 / 2015)
- 2nd Place ADCC World Championship (2019)
- 3rd Place IBJJF World Championship (2011)
- 3rd Place ADCC World Championship (2017)

=== Mixed martial arts ===
- ONE Championship
  - Performance of the Night (Two times) vs. Kirill Grishenko and Amir Aliakbari
- MMAjunkie.com
  - 2022 August Submission of the Month vs. Kirill Grishenko

== Brazilian jiu-jitsu / submission wrestling record ==
142 Matches, 128 Wins (67 Submissions), 13 Losses (6 Submissions), 1 draw
Rec.	Result	Opponent	Method	Event	Division	Type	Date	Location
Loss	128–13–1	(United States) Gordon Ryan	Negative Points (1–0)	ADCC World Championship	Absolute	Nogi	September 29, 2019	(United States) Anaheim, CA
Win	128–12–1	(Brazil) Mahamed Aly	Submission (rear naked choke)	ADCC World Championship	Absolute	Nogi	September 29, 2019	(United States) Anaheim, CA
Win	127–12–1	(United States) Aaron Johnson	Points (3–0)	ADCC World Championship	Absolute	Nogi	September 29, 2019	(United States) Anaheim, CA
Win	126–12–1	(United States) Keith Krikorian	Submission (armbar)	ADCC World Championship	Absolute	Nogi	September 29, 2019	(United States) Anaheim, CA
Loss	125–12–1	(Brazil) Kaynan Duarte	Referee Decision	ADCC World Championship	+99 kg	Nogi	September 29, 2019	(United States) Anaheim, CA
Win	125–11–1	(Brazil) Victor Hugo	Points (3–0)	ADCC World Championship	+99 kg	Nogi	September 28, 2019	(United States) Anaheim, CA
Win	124–11–1	(Brazil) Antonio Braga Neto	Points (2–0)	ADCC World Championship	+99 kg	Nogi	September 28, 2019	(United States) Anaheim, CA
Win	123–11–1	(Brazil) Ricardo Evangelista	Submission (bow & arrow choke)	IBJJF World Championship	+100 kg	Gi	June 2, 2018	(United States) Long Beach, CA
Win	122–11–1	(Brazil) Max Gimenis	Submission (choke)	IBJJF World Championship	+100 kg	Gi	June 2, 2018	(United States) Long Beach, CA
Win	121–11–1	(United States) Thomas McMahon	Points (11–0)	IBJJF World Championship	+100 kg	Gi	June 2, 2018	(United States) Long Beach, CA
Win	120–11–1	(Brazil) Felipe Andrew	Submission (armbar)	IBJJF World Championship	Absolute	Gi	June 1, 2018	(United States) Long Beach, CA
Win	119–11–1	(Brazil) Felipe Pena	Referee Decision	IBJJF World Championship	Absolute	Gi	June 1, 2018	(United States) Long Beach, CA
Win	118–11–1	(Brazil) Otavio Nalati	Points (13–0)	IBJJF World Championship	Absolute	Gi	June 1, 2018	(United States) Long Beach, CA
Loss	117–11–1	(Brazil) João Gabriel Rocha	Advantages	BJJ Stars	Superfight	Gi	February 23, 2019	(Brazil) São Paulo
Win	117–10–1	(Brazil) João Gabriel Rocha	Referee Decision	IBJJF World Championship	+100 kg	Gi	June 3, 2018	(United States) Long Beach, CA
Win	116–10–1	(Brazil) Victor Honório	Submission (kimura)	IBJJF World Championship	+100 kg	Gi	June 3, 2018	(United States) Long Beach, CA
Win	115–10–1	(Brazil) Otavio Nalati	Points (2–0)	IBJJF World Championship	+100 kg	Gi	June 3, 2018	(United States) Long Beach, CA
Win	114–10–1	(Brazil) Max Gimenis	Submission (choke)	IBJJF World Championship	+100 kg	Gi	June 2, 2018	(United States) Long Beach, CA
Win	113–10–1	(Brazil) Nicholas Meregali	Points (5–2)	IBJJF World Championship	Absolute	Gi	June 2, 2018	(United States) Long Beach, CA
Win	112–10–1	(Brazil) Felipe Andrews	Submission (choke)	IBJJF World Championship	Absolute	Gi	June 2, 2018	(United States) Long Beach, CA
Win	111–10–1	(Brazil) Rodrigo Martins	Points (2–0)	IBJJF World Championship	Absolute	Gi	June 2, 2018	(United States) Long Beach, CA
Win	110–10–1	(Brazil) Mahamed Aly	Points	ACBJJ	Superfight	Gi	May 5, 2018	(United States) Long Beach, CA
Win	109–10–1	(Brazil) Mahamed Aly	Submission (heel hook)	ADCC World Championship	Absolute	Nogi	September 24, 2017	(Finland) Espoo
Loss	108–10–1	(Brazil) Felipe Pena	Submission (rear naked choke)	ADCC World Championship	Absolute	Nogi	September 24, 2017	(Finland) Espoo
Win	108–9–1	(Brazil) Alexandre Ribeiro	Referee Decision	ADCC World Championship	Absolute	Nogi	September 24, 2017	(Finland) Espoo
Win	107–9–1	(United States) Mike Perez	Negative Points (0–1)	ADCC World Championship	Absolute	Nogi	September 24, 2017	(Finland) Espoo
Win	106–9–1	(United States) Orlando Sanchez	Points (6–0)	ADCC World Championship	+99 kg	Nogi	September 24, 2017	(Finland) Espoo
Win	105–9–1	(Brazil) Roberto Abreu	Points (4–0)	ADCC World Championship	+99 kg	Nogi	September 24, 2017	(Finland) Espoo
Win	104–9–1	(United States) Tim Spriggs	Submission (rear naked choke)	ADCC World Championship	+99 kg	Nogi	September 23, 2017	(Finland) Espoo
Win	103–9–1	(Kazakhstan) Arman Zhanpeisov	Submission (rear naked choke)	ADCC World Championship	+99 kg	Nogi	September 23, 2017	(Finland) Espoo
Win	102–9–1	(Brazil) Leandro Lo	Referee Decision	IBJJF Pro Grand Prix	Absolute	Gi	August 26, 2017	(United States) Long Beach, CA
Win	101–9–1	(Brazil) João Gabriel Rocha	Submission (choke)	IBJJF Pro Grand Prix	Absolute	Gi	August 26, 2017	(United States) Long Beach, CA
Win	100–9–1	(Brazil) Dimitrius Souza	Advantages (2–0)	IBJJF Pro Grand Prix	Absolute	Gi	August 26, 2017	(United States) Long Beach, CA
Loss	99–9–1	(Brazil) Roger Gracie	Submission (choke)	Gracie Pro	Superfight	Gi	July 23, 2017	(Brazil) Rio de Janeiro
Win	99–8–1	(Brazil) Leandro Lo	Advantages	IBJJF World Championship	Absolute	Gi	June 4, 2017	(United States) Long Beach, CA
Win	98–8–1	(Brazil) Gustavo Elias	Submission (brabo choke)	IBJJF World Championship	+100 kg	Gi	June 4, 2017	(United States) Long Beach, CA
Win	97–8–1	(Brazil) João Gabriel Rocha	Submission (ezekiel choke)	IBJJF World Championship	+100 kg	Gi	June 4, 2017	(United States) Long Beach, CA
Win	96–8–1	(Brazil) Igor Schneider	Points (13–7)	IBJJF World Championship	+100 kg	Gi	June 4, 2017	(United States) Long Beach, CA
Win	95–8–1	(Brazil) Erberth Santos	Points (2–0)	IBJJF World Championship	Absolute	Gi	June 3, 2017	(United States) Long Beach, CA
Win	94–8–1	(Brazil) Mahamad Aly	Submission (choke)	IBJJF World Championship	Absolute	Gi	June 3, 2017	(United States) Long Beach, CA
Win	93–8–1	(Brazil) Igor Schneider	Submission (armbar)	IBJJF World Championship	Absolute	Gi	June 3, 2017	(United States) Long Beach, CA
Win	92–8–1	(United States) Rafael Lovato Jr.	Points (5–0)	ADCC North American Trials	Superfight	Nogi	April 15, 2017	(United States) Los Angeles, CA
Win	91–8–1	(United States) Eliot Marshall	Submission (inverted triangle)	Fight 2 Win	Superfight	Nogi	August 13, 2016	(United States) Denver, CO
Win	90–8–1	(Brazil) Leo Nogueira	Advantages	IBJJF Pro Grand Prix	Absolute	Gi	July 10, 2016	(United States) Long Beach, CA
Win	89–8–1	(Brazil) João Gabriel Rocha	Points (7–0)	IBJJF Pro Grand Prix	Absolute	Gi	July 10, 2016	(United States) Long Beach, CA
Win	88–8–1	(Brazil) Bruno Bastos	Submission (bow & arrow choke)	IBJJF Pro Grand Prix	Absolute	Gi	July 10, 2016	(United States) Long Beach, CA
Win	87–8–1	(Brazil) Erberth Santos	Points (4–2)	IBJJF World Championship	Absolute	Gi		(United States) Long Beach, CA
Win	86–8–1	(United States) James Puepolo	Submission (armbar)	IBJJF World Championship	+100 kg	Gi		(United States) Long Beach, CA
Win	85–8–1	(Brazil) João Gabriel Rocha	Submission (armbar)	IBJJF World Championship	+100 kg	Gi		(United States) Long Beach, CA
Win	84–8–1	(Brazil) Felipe Pena	Submission (armbar)	IBJJF World Championship	Absolute	Gi		(United States) Long Beach, CA
Win	83–8–1	(Brazil) Pedro Moura	Submission (armbar)	IBJJF World Championship	Absolute	Gi		(United States) Long Beach, CA
Win	82–8–1	(Australia) Elliot Kelly	Points (6–0)	IBJJF World Championship	Absolute	Gi		(United States) Long Beach, CA
Loss	81–8–1	(Brazil) Ricardo Evangelista	Advantages	IBJJF World Championship	Absolute	Gi	2015	(United States) Long Beach, CA
Win	81–7–1	(United States) Alan Regis	Submission (armbar)	IBJJF World Championship	Absolute	Gi	2015	(United States) Long Beach, CA
Win	80–7–1	(Brazil) Gabriel Checco	Submission (estima lock)	JJ World League	Superfight	Gi	2015	
Win	79–7–1	(Denmark) Alexander Trans	Advantages	World Cup	Absolute	Gi	2015	(United Arab Emirates) Abu Dhabi
Win	78–7–1	(Brazil) Leandro Lo	Advantages	World Cup	Absolute	Gi	2015	(United Arab Emirates) Abu Dhabi
Win	77–7–1	(Brazil) Erberth Santos	Submission (estima lock)	World Cup	Absolute	Gi	2015	(United Arab Emirates) Abu Dhabi
Win	76–7–1	(Brazil) Helcio Pinto	Submission (guillotine choke)	World Cup	Absolute	Gi	2015	(United Arab Emirates) Abu Dhabi
Win	75–7–1	(Denmark) Alexander Trans	Points (2–0)	World Cup	+95 kg	Gi	2015	(United Arab Emirates) Abu Dhabi
Win	74–7–1	(Brazil) Ricardo Evangelista	Submission (guillotine choke)	World Cup	+95 kg	Gi	2015	(United Arab Emirates) Abu Dhabi
Win	73–7–1	(Brazil) Rodrigo Perriera	Submission (choke)	World Cup	+95 kg	Gi	2015	(United Arab Emirates) Abu Dhabi
Win	72–7–1	(Brazil) Rodolfo Vieira	Points (2–0)	IBJJF World Championship	Absolute	Gi	2014	(United States) Long Beach, CA
Win	71–7–1	(Denmark) Alexander Trans	Submission (choke)	IBJJF World Championship	+100 kg	Gi	2014	(United States) Long Beach, CA
Win	70–7–1	(Brazil) Ricardo Evangelista	Submission (choke)	IBJJF World Championship	+100 kg	Gi	2014	(United States) Long Beach, CA
Win	69–7–1	(Brazil) Helton Nogueira	Submission (armbar)	IBJJF World Championship	+100 kg	Gi	2014	(United States) Long Beach, CA
Win	68–7–1	(United States) Keenan Cornelius	Points (10–4)	IBJJF World Championship	Absolute	Gi	2014	(United States) Long Beach, CA
Win	67–7–1	(Brazil) Felipe Pena	Submission (armbar)	IBJJF World Championship	Absolute	Gi	2014	(United States) Long Beach, CA
Win	66–7–1	(Brazil) Ricardo Evangelista	Advantages	IBJJF World Championship	Absolute	Gi	2014	(United States) Long Beach, CA
Win	65–7–1	(Brazil) James Nunes	Submission (armbar)	IBJJF World Championship	Absolute	Gi	2014	(United States) Long Beach, CA
Win	64–7–1	(Denmark) Alexander Trans	Points (2–0)	World Cup	+95 kg	Gi	2014	(United Arab Emirates) Abu Dhabi
Win	63–7–1	(Brazil) Ricardo Evangelista	Advantages	World Cup	+95 kg	Gi	2014	(United Arab Emirates) Abu Dhabi
Win	62–7–1	(Brazil) Allan Ferreira	Points (7–0)	World Cup	+95 kg	Gi	2014	(United Arab Emirates) Abu Dhabi
Win	61–7–1	(Brazil) Rodolfo Vieira	Points (2–0)	World Cup	Absolute	Gi	2014	
Win	60–7–1	(United States) Keenan Cornelius	Advantages	World Cup	Absolute	Gi	2014	
Win	59–7–1	(Brazil) Victor Estima	Submission (choke)	World Cup	Absolute	Gi	2014	
Win	58–7–1	(Brazil) Claudio Calasans	Submission (choke)	World Cup	Absolute	Gi	2014	
Win	57–7–1	(Italy) Luca Anacoreta	Submission (katagatame)	World Cup	Absolute	Gi	2014	
Loss	56–7–1	(Brazil) Roberto Abreu	Points (0–10)	ADCC World Championship	Absolute	Nogi	2013	(China) Beijing
Win	56–6–1	(United States) Dean Lister	Points (5–0)	ADCC 2013	Absolute	Nogi	2013	(China) Beijing
Win	55–6–1	(United States) Garry Tonon	Points	ADCC 2013	Absolute	Nogi	2013	(China) Beijing
Win	54–6–1	(Brazil) João Gabriel Rocha	Submission (heel hook)	ADCC 2013	+99 kg	Nogi	2013	(China) Beijing
Win	53–6–1	(Brazil) Roberto Abreu	Points	ADCC 2013	+99 kg	Nogi	2013	(China) Beijing
Win	52–6–1	(Japan) Hideki Sekine	Submission (kimura)	ADCC 2013	+99 kg	Nogi	2013	(China) Beijing
Win	51–6–1	(United States) Jimmy Friedrich	Submission (toe hold)	ADCC 2013	+99 kg	Nogi	2013	(China) Beijing
Win	50–6–1	(Brazil) Rodolfo Vieira	Points (10–0)	World Championship	Absolute	Gi	2013	(United States) Long Beach, CA
Win	49–6–1	(Denmark) Alexander Trans	Referee Decision	World Championship	+100 kg	Gi	2013	(United States) Long Beach, CA
Win	48–6–1	(Brazil) Igor Silva	Referee Decision	World Championship	+100 kg	Gi	2013	(United States) Long Beach, CA
Win	47–6–1	(Brazil) Bernardo Faria	Points (7–4)	World Championship	Absolute	Gi	2013	(United States) Long Beach, CA
Win	46–6–1	(Brazil) Ricardo Evangelista	Submission (ezekiel choke)	World Championship	Absolute	Gi	2013	(United States) Long Beach, CA
Win	45–6–1	(Brazil) Bruno Bastos	Submission (triangle choke)	World Championship	Absolute	Gi	2013	(United States) Long Beach, CA
Win	44–6–1	(Brazil) Flavius Luis	Submission (kimura)	World Championship	Absolute	Gi	2013	(United States) Long Beach, CA
Win	43–6–1	(Brazil) Rodolfo Vieira	Points (4–2)	World Cup	Absolute	Gi	2013	(United Arab Emirates) Abu Dhabi
Win	42–6–1	(Brazil) Tarsis Humphreys	Points	World Cup	Absolute	Gi	2013	(United Arab Emirates) Abu Dhabi
Win	41–6–1	(Brazil) Roberto Abreu	Points (4–3)	World Cup	Absolute	Gi	2013	(United Arab Emirates) Abu Dhabi
Loss	40–6–1	(Brazil) Rodrigo Cavaca	Points (2=7)	World Cup	+100 kg	Gi	2013	(United Arab Emirates) Abu Dhabi
Win	40–5–1	(Brazil) Ricardo Evangelista	Points (2–0)	World Cup	+100 kg	Gi	2013	(United Arab Emirates) Abu Dhabi
Win	39–5–1	(Brazil) André Galvão	Points (4–2)	Pan American Championship	Absolute	Gi	2013	(United States) Long Beach, CA
Win	38–5–1	(Brazil) Bernardo Faria	Points (9–2)	Pan American Championship	Absolute	Gi	2013	(United States) Long Beach, CA
Win	37–5–1	(Brazil) Gustavo Campos	Points (19–2)	Pan American Championship	Absolute	Gi	2013	(United States) Long Beach, CA
Win	36–5–1	(Brazil) Marcel Goulart	Submission (inverted triangle)	Pan American Championship	Absolute	Gi	2013	(United States) Long Beach, CA
Draw	35–5–1	(Brazil) Roger Gracie	Decision	Metamoris	Superfight	Gi	2012	
Win	35–5	(Brazil) Leo Nogueira	Points (8–4)	World Championship	Absolute	Gi	2012	(United States) Long Beach, CA
Win	34–5	(Brazil) Márcio Cruz	Points (4–2)	World Championship	+100 kg	Gi	2012	(United States) Long Beach, CA
Win	33–5	(Brazil) Igor Silva	Submission (kneebar)	World Championship	+100 kg	Gi	2012	(United States) Long Beach, CA
Win	32–5	(Brazil) Alex Soares	Submission (choke)	World Championship	+100 kg	Gi	2012	(United States) Long Beach, CA
Win	31–5	(Brazil) Bernardo Faria	Submission (Choke)	World Championship	Absolute	Gi	2012	(United States) Long Beach, CA
Win	30–5	(Brazil) Rodolfo Vieira	Points (8–7)	World Championship	Absolute	Gi	2012	(United States) Long Beach, CA
Win	29–5	(Brazil) Roberto Alencar	Submission (triangle choke)	World Championship	Absolute	Gi	2012	(United States) Long Beach, CA
Win	28–5	(United States) Raymond Warren	Submission (armbar)	World Championship	Absolute	Gi	2012	(United States) Long Beach, CA
Win	27–5	(Brazil) Antonio Braga Neto	Submission (footlock)	World Cup	+99 kg	Gi	2012	(United Arab Emirates) Abu Dhabi
Win	26–5	(Brazil) José Junior	Submission (armbar)	World Cup	+99 kg	Gi	2012	(United Arab Emirates) Abu Dhabi
Win	25–5	(Brazil) Thiago Souza	Points (2–0)	World Cup	+99 kg	Gi	2012	(United Arab Emirates) Abu Dhabi
Win	24–5	(United States) Mike Wilson	Points (15–0)	World Cup	+99 kg	Gi	2012	(United Arab Emirates) Abu Dhabi
Win	23–5	(Brazil) Adrian Nalito	Submission (toe hoke)	Gramado Trials	+94 kg	Gi	2012	(United Arab Emirates) Abu Dhabi
Win	22–5	(Denmark) Alexander Trans	Points (2–0)	Pan American Championship	+99 kg	Gi	2012	(United States) Long Beach, CA
Win	21–5	(Brazil) Kitner Moura	Submission (omoplata)	Pan American Championship	+99 kg	Gi	2012	(United States) Long Beach, CA
Win	20–5	(Brazil) Kron Gracie	Submission (kneebar)	Pan American Championship	Absolute	Gi	2012	(United States) Long Beach, CA
Win	19–5	(Brazil) Murilo Santana	Points (10–0)	Pan American Championship	Absolute	Gi	2012	(United States) Long Beach, CA
Win	18–5	(United States) Matt Jubera	Submission (choke)	Pan American Championship	Absolute	Gi	2012	(United States) Long Beach, CA
Win	17–5	(Brazil) Marcus Alentari	Submission (armbar)	Pan American Championship	Absolute	Gi	2012	(United States) Long Beach, CA
Win	16–5	(Brazil) Leandro Lo	Points	CBJJE Pan Ams	Absolute	Gi	2012	
Win	15–5	(Brazil) Claudio Calasans	Points	CBJJE Pan Ams	Absolute	Gi	2012	
Win	14–5	(Brazil) Antonio Peinado	Submission (darce choke)	Nogi World Championship	+97.5 kg	Nogi	2011	(United States) Long Beach, CA
Win	13–5	(Sweden) Joackim Hallum	Submission	Nogi World Championship	+97.5 kg	Nogi	2011	(United States) Long Beach, CA
Win	12–5	(Brazil) Alberto Vilanova	Submission (triangle choke)	Nogi World Championship	+97.5 kg	Nogi	2011	(United States) Long Beach, CA
Win	11–5	(Brazil) James Harbison	Submission (toe hold)	Nogi World Championship	Absolute	Nogi	2011	(United States) Long Beach, CA
Win	10–5	(Brazil) Marcelo Goncalves	Points (4–0)	Nogi World Championship	Absolute	Nogi	2011	(United States) Long Beach, CA
Win	9–5	(Sweden) Joackim Hallum	Points (24–2)	Nogi World Championship	Absolute	Nogi	2011	(United States) Long Beach, CA
Loss	8–5	(Brazil) André Galvão	Submission	World Cup Trials	Superfight	Gi	2011	
Loss	8–4	(Brazil) Vinny Magalhães	Submission (toe hold)	Ultimate Absolute NYC	Absolute	Nogi	July 30, 2011	(United States) New York City, NY
Loss	8–3	(Brazil) Leo Nogueira	Referee Decision	IBJJF World Championship	–100 kg	Gi	2011	(United States) Long Beach, CA
Win	8–2	(Brazil) Antonio Peinado	Submission (toe hold)	World Championship	–100 kg	Gi	2011	(United States) Long Beach, CA
Win	7–2	(Brazil) Charles Dantas	Submission (wrist lock)	World Championship	–100 kg	Gi	2011	(United States) Long Beach, CA
Loss	6–2	(Brazil) Rodolfo Vieira	Submission (armbar)	World Championship	Absolute	Gi	2011	(United States) Long Beach, CA
Win	6–1	(Brazil) Antonio Braga Neto	Submission (bow & arrow choke)	World Championship	–100 kg	Gi	2011	(United States) Long Beach, CA
Win	5–1	(Brazil) Antonio Pega Leve	Submission (toe hold)	World Championship	–100 kg	Gi	2011	(United States) Long Beach, CA
Win	4–1	(Brazil) Charles Dantas	Submission	World Championship	–100 kg	Gi	2011	(United States) Long Beach, CA
Loss	3–1	(Brazil) Lúcio Rodrigues	Points (0–5)	World Cup	–92 kg	Gi	2011	(United Arab Emirates) Abu Dhabi
Win	3–0	(Brazil) Caio Alencar	Submission	World Cup	–92 kg	Gi	2011	(United Arab Emirates) Abu Dhabi
Win	2–0	(Brazil) Antonio Braga Neto	Submission (toe hold)	World Cup	–92 kg	Gi	2011	(United Arab Emirates) Abu Dhabi
Win	1–0	(Brazil) Bruno Bastos	Submission (cross choke)	Pan American Championship	–100 kg	Gi	2011	(United States) Long Beach, CA

== Mixed martial arts record ==
Professional record breakdown
9 matches	5 wins	3 losses
By knockout	1	1
By submission	4	0
By decision	0	2
Draws	1	

Res.	Record	Opponent	Method	Event	Date	Round	Time	Location	Notes
Loss	5–3–1	Ryan Spann	KO (punches)	UFC Fight Night: Sterling vs. Zalal	April 25, 2026	2	2:10	Las Vegas, Nevada, United States	
Draw	5–2–1	Kennedy Nzechukwu	Draw (unanimous)	UFC on ESPN: Royval vs. Kape	December 13, 2025	3	5:00	Las Vegas, Nevada, United States	Nzechukwu was deducted one point in round 2 due to an eye poke.
Loss	5–2	Martin Buday	Decision (unanimous)	UFC on ABC: Whittaker vs. de Ridder	July 26, 2025	3	5:00	Abu Dhabi, United Arab Emirates	
Win	5–1	Amir Aliakbari	Submission (rear-naked choke)	ONE 169	November 9, 2024	1	3:15	Bangkok, Thailand	Performance of the Night.
Loss	4–1	Oumar Kane	Decision (unanimous)	ONE Fight Night 13	August 5, 2023	3	5:00	Bangkok, Thailand	
Win	4–0	Kirill Grishenko	Submission (heel hook)	ONE on Prime Video 1	August 27, 2022	1	1:04	Kallang, Singapore	Performance of the Night.
Win	3–0	Simon Carson	TKO (punches)	ONE 158	June 3, 2022	1	2:24	Kallang, Singapore	
Win	2–0	Kang Ji-won	Submission (rear-naked choke)	ONE: Winter Warriors	December 3, 2021	1	2:27	Kallang, Singapore	
Win	1–0	Anderson da Silva	Submission (north-south choke)	ONE: Revolution	September 24, 2021	1	2:55	Kallang, Singapore	Heavyweight debut.

== Instructor lineage ==
Carlos Gracie Sr. > Carlson Gracie > Élcio Figueiredo > Rodrigo Cavaca > Marcus Almeida

== See also ==
- Erberth Santos
