= Anatoly Malykhin =

Russian mixed martial artist and wrestler

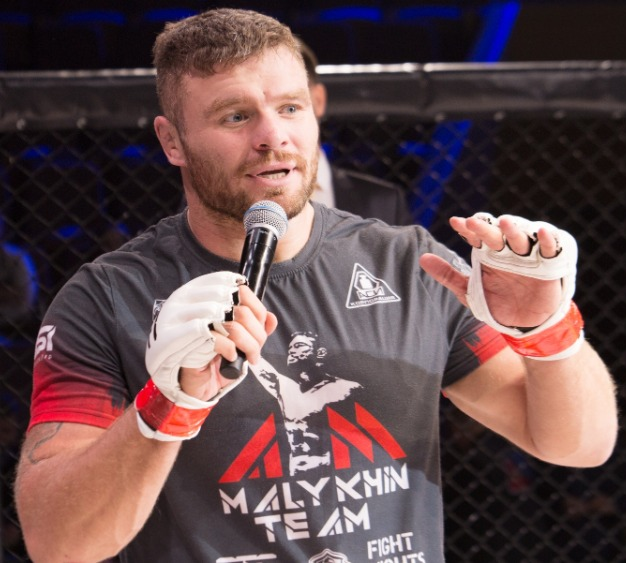
- Malykhin in 2019
- Born: Anatoly Sergeevich Malykhin; January 11, 1988 (age 38); Kemerovo, Russian SFSR, Soviet Union
- Native name: Анатолий Малыхин
- Other names: Сладкий (The sweet)
- Height: 5 ft 11 in (180 cm)
- Weight: 204.6 lb (93 kg; 14 st 9 lb)
- Division: Heavyweight; Light Heavyweight (Note: ONE Championship refers to their 225 lbs class as Light heavyweight, but under the Association of Boxing Commissions in the United States, 225 lbs is considered Cruiserweight.); Middleweight (Note: ONE Championship refers to their 205 lbs class as Middleweight, but under the Association of Boxing Commissions in the United States, 205 lbs is considered Light heavyweight.)
- Reach: 78 in (198 cm)
- Fighting out of: Phuket, Thailand; Mytishchi, Moscow Oblast, Russia
- Team: Tiger Muay Thai; Raty Team; Golden Team
- Trainer: Vladimir Osiya (MMA); Vladimir Zakharushkin (wrestling)
- Wrestling: Master of Sport in freestyle wrestling
- Years active: 2016–2026

Mixed martial arts record
- Total: 16
- Wins: 15
- By knockout: 11
- By submission: 4
- Losses: 1
- By decision: 1

Amateur record
- Total: 4
- Wins: 4
- By knockout: 2
- By submission: 2

Other information
- Mixed martial arts record from Sherdog
Medal record
Men's freestyle wrestling
Representing Russia
Russian Championship
Bronze medal – third place	2013 Krasnoyarsk	120 kg
President Cup of Buryatia Republic
Gold medal – first place	2013 Ulan-Ude	120 kg
Submission grappling
UWW European Championship
Gold medal – first place	2016 Rome	+100 kg
Russian Championship
Silver medal – second place	2016 Naro-Fominsk	+100 kg
Amateur mixed martial arts
WMMAA World Championship
Gold medal – first place	2017 Astana	+93 kg

Anatoly Sergeevich Malykhin (Russian: Анатолий Сергеевич Малыхин; born January 11, 1988) is a Russian former mixed martial artist and wrestler. Malykhin formerly competed in the Middleweight, Light Heavyweight, and Heavyweight divisions of ONE Championship, where was the ONE Light Heavyweight MMA World Champion, ONE Middleweight MMA World Champion, and the two-time ONE Heavyweight MMA World Champion, along with being the interim ONE Heavyweight World Champion in 2022. He was the first fighter in history to win major MMA championships in three weight classes and the first to hold them simultaneously.

Malykhin is a Master of Sport in freestyle wrestling, and won a bronze medal at the 2013 Russian championship. He also won gold in submission grappling at the 2016 UWW European championships and is a 2017 WMMAA world champion in amateur mixed martial arts (MMA).

== Background ==
Malykhin was born on January 11, 1988, in Kemerovo, Kemerovo Oblast, Soviet Union (now Russian Federation). He began wrestling in the fifth grade and won several youth championships. In 2013, he won gold at the President Cup of Buryatia Republic in freestyle wrestling and placed third at the Russian national championship as a heavyweight. Malykhin was later disqualified for two years because he did not appear for doping tests, which he claims was due to a misunderstanding. In 2016, Malykhin competed in submission grappling, winning at the championships for the Kemerovo region and the Siberian Federal District to qualify for the All-Russian championships. Malykhin was the runner-up at the All-Russian championships, qualifying for the UWW European championships. At the European grappling championships in July, Malykhin won gold in the 100+ kg division.

== Mixed martial arts career ==
=== Early career ===
According to Malykhin, there were no prospects for wrestlers in his native Kemerovo, despite the fact that the city had many good coaches and athletes. Malykhin was repeatedly invited to Moscow, where he met coach Vladimir Osiy, who became his mentor.

Malykhin made his professional mixed martial arts (MMA) debut in September 2016, defeating Ilya Gunenko in the first round. He would compete again three months later against Murad Kalimetov at Battle on the Volga Border 2016, winning the bout by submission.

==== Amateur world championships ====
In May 2017, Malykhin competed at the Russian championship in amateur MMA, defeating Dagestani Salimgerey Rasulov. In October 2017, Malykhin competed at the WMMAA amateur world championships in Astana, Kazakhstan. He fought in the heavyweight (over 93 kg/205 lb) division, defeating Spanish fighter Oswaldo Gil and Greek fighter Athanasios Barkas to qualify for the final, where he defeated Uzbek fighter Azamat Bahodurzoda by technical knockout (TKO) to become a world champion.

==== Return to professional competition ====
Malykhin returned to professional MMA on November 3, 2017, against Reza Torabi. He successfully used ground-and-pound to win by TKO.

Malykin won his next three bouts via submission in the first round against Michał Wlazło at Golden Team Championship 3, Magomedbag Agaev at Fight Nights Global 91, and Jake Heun at Absolute Siberian Championship 1. Malykin next competed on April 25, 2019, as part of Fight Nights Global 93, against Alexei Kudin. Despite Kudin's experience, Malykhin constantly imposed his fighting style on his opponent. In the second round, Malykhin took the bout to the ground, after which he inflicted a series of punches, leading the referee to stop the bout.

Malykhin's last bout on the Russian scene took place on October 30, 2019. As part of the GTC 07 tournament, Malykhin faced Argentinean Lucas Elsina. In the first round, Malykhin took Elsina down and finished him with punches for a TKO stoppage.

After his undefeated run on the Russian regional scene, Malykin signed with ONE Championship.

=== ONE Championship ===
Malykhin made his promotional debut against Alexandre Machado on February 26, 2021, and aired on March 5, 2021, at ONE: First of Fury 2. He won the fight via TKO (submission to punches) in the first round, having managed to pin Machado in a crucifix and proceed to connect elbows, forcing Machado to submit.

Malykhin faced Amir Aliakbari on September 24, 2021, at ONE: Revolution. He won the fight via knockout in the first round.

==== Interim ONE Heavyweight World Champion ====
Malykhin was scheduled to face Kirill Grishenko for the interim ONE Heavyweight World Championship on January 28, 2022, at ONE: Only the Brave. However, Malykhin withdrew because of testing positive for COVID-19 days before the event, and the bout was moved to ONE: Bad Blood on February 11, 2022. He won the fight via knockout in the second round. This win earned him a $100,000 Performance of the Night award.

Malykhin was scheduled to Arjan Bhullar for the ONE Heavyweight World Championship unification bout on September 29, 2022, at ONE 161. However, Bhullar withdraw due to suffering an injury in training that required surgery and the bout was cancelled.

==== Double champion ====
Malykhin faced Reinier de Ridder for the ONE Light Heavyweight World Championship on December 3, 2022, at ONE on Prime Video 5. He won the fight via knockout in the first round and earned the title. This win earned him his second $100,000 Performance of the Night award.

The unification bout between Malykhin and Arjan Bhullar for the ONE Heavyweight World Championship was rescheduled for March 25, 2023, at ONE Fight Night 8. However, the bout was removed from the event because of a shift in broadcaster commitments. The bout was scheduled on July 15, 2023, at ONE Fight Night 12. However, for unknown reasons, the bout was moved again to ONE Friday Fights 22 on June 22, 2023. Malykhin won the fight via TKO in the third round to become the undisputed ONE Heavyweight Champion. This win also earned him a $50,000 Performance of the Night award.

==== Triple champion ====
Malykhin faced Reinier de Ridder in a rematch, this time for de Ridder's ONE Middleweight World Championship on March 1, 2024, at ONE 166. Malykhin won the title by TKO in round three after de Ridder did not get up, becoming the first three-division champion in MMA history as well as the first to hold three championships simultaneously. The win also earned him a $50,000 Performance of the Night award.

In the first title defense at heavyweight, Malykhin faced Oumar Kane on November 9, 2024, at ONE 169. He lost the title via split decision.

Malykhin was scheduled to rematch Oumar Kane for the ONE Heavyweight World Championship on November 16, 2025, at ONE 173. However, Kane was forced to withdraw from the bout due to being involved in a serious car accident resulting in the cancellation of the fight.

Malykhin rematched Oumar Kane on May 15, 2026 at ONE Friday Fights 154, knocking him out in the fourth round to regain his title. After the bout he announced his retirement from competition and vacated all three belts held in the promotion.

== Wrestling ==
On September 5, 2026, Malykhin competed in a freestyle wrestling match at the Real American Freestyle at Moscow, losing to Pouya Rahmani by a score of 10–3.

== Personal life ==
Malykhin and his wife, Anita, have a son, born in 2020.

== Championships and accomplishments ==
=== Freestyle wrestling ===
- Russian Wrestling Federation
  - 2013 Russian Championship - (bronze) 3rd place, 120 kg
  - 2013 President Cup of Buryatia Republic - (gold) 1st place, 120 kg

=== Mixed martial arts (amateur) ===
- World Mixed Martial Arts Association (WMMAA)
  - 2017 World Championship - (gold) 1st place, heavyweight (over 93 kg / 205 lbs)

=== Mixed martial arts (professional) ===
- ONE Championship
  - ONE Middleweight World Championship (One time)
  - ONE Light Heavyweight World Championship (One time)
  - ONE Heavyweight World Championship (Two times)
  - Interim ONE Heavyweight World Championship (One time)
  - Performance of the Night (Four times) vs. Kirill Grishenko, Reinier de Ridder (x2), Arjan Bhullar
  - 2022 MMA Athlete of the Year
  - Fifth double champion in ONE history
  - First three-division champion in MMA history
    - First simultaneous triple champion in MMA history
  - Highest finishing rate among ONE champions (100%)
  - Most championships won (4)
  - Longest active finishing streak (6)
  - 2024: Ranked #3 Fight of the Year vs. Reinier de Ridder

=== Submission grappling ===
- All-Russian Federation of Grappling
  - 2016 Russian Championship - (silver) 2nd place, +100 kg
- United World Wrestling
  - 2016 European Championship - (gold) 1st place, +100 kg

== Mixed martial arts record ==
Professional record breakdown
16 matches	15 wins	1 loss
By knockout	11	0
By submission	4	0
By decision	0	1

Res.	Record	Opponent	Method	Event	Date	Round	Time	Location	Notes
Win	15–1	Oumar Kane	KO (punches)	ONE: The Inner Circle 14	May 15, 2026	4	1:54	Bangkok, Thailand	Won the ONE Heavyweight Championship. Vacated title after announcing retirement.
Loss	14–1	Oumar Kane	Decision (split)	ONE 169	November 9, 2024	5	5:00	Bangkok, Thailand	Lost the ONE Heavyweight Championship.
Win	14–0	Reinier de Ridder	TKO (retirement)	ONE 166	March 1, 2024	3	1:16	Lusail, Qatar	Middleweight (205 lb) debut. Won the ONE Middleweight Championship (205 lb). Performance of the Night. Vacated title after announcing retirement.
Win	13–0	Arjan Bhullar	TKO (punches)	ONE Friday Fights 22	June 23, 2023	3	2:42	Bangkok, Thailand	Won and unified the ONE Heavyweight Championship. Performance of the Night.
Win	12–0	Reinier de Ridder	KO (punches)	ONE on Prime Video 5	December 3, 2022	1	4:35	Pasay, Philippines	Light Heavyweight (225 lb) debut. Won the ONE Light Heavyweight Championship (225 lb). Performance of the Night. Vacated title after announcing retirement.
Win	11–0	Kirill Grishenko	KO (punch)	ONE: Bad Blood	February 11, 2022	2	3:42	Kallang, Singapore	Won the interim ONE Heavyweight Championship. Performance of the Night.
Win	10–0	Amir Aliakbari	KO (punches)	ONE: Revolution	September 24, 2021	1	2:57	Kallang, Singapore	
Win	9–0	Alexandre Machado	TKO (submission to punches)	ONE: Fists of Fury 2	March 5, 2021	1	3:28	Kallang, Singapore	
Win	8–0	Lucas Alsina	TKO (punches)	Golden Team Championship 7	October 30, 2019	1	3:34	Moscow, Russia	
Win	7–0	Alexei Kudin	TKO (punches)	Fight Nights Global 93: Mytyshchi Cup	April 25, 2019	2	3:32	Mytishchi, Russia	
Win	6–0	Jake Heun	Submission (keylock)	Absolute Siberian Championship 1	March 4, 2019	1	1:45	Kemerovo, Russia	
Win	5–0	Magomedbag Agaev	Submission (keylock)	Fight Nights Global 91	December 27, 2018	1	1:22	Moscow, Russia	
Win	4–0	Michał Wlazło	Submission (rear-naked choke)	Golden Team Championship 3	March 10, 2018	1	3:35	Lyubertsy, Russia	
Win	3–0	Reza Torabi	TKO (punches)	Golden Team Championship 1	November 3, 2017	1	2:26	Moscow, Russia	
Win	2–0	Murad Kalimetov	Submission (arm-triangle choke)	Battle on the Volga Border 2016	December 17, 2016	1	3:10	Balakovo, Russia	
Win	1–0	Ilya Gunenko	TKO (punches)	SK Pro: Grandprix MMA Quarterfinals	September 17, 2016	1	2:21	Tomsk, Russia	

Amateur record breakdown		
4 matches	4 wins	0 losses
By knockout	2	0
By submission	2	0

Res.	Record	Opponent	Method	Event	Date	Round	Time	Location	Notes
Win	4–0	Azamat Bahodurzoda	TKO (punches)	WMMAA - 5th World MMA Championships 2017	October 7, 2017	1	2:11	Astana, Kazakhstan	Won the 2017 WMMAA Heavyweight World Championship.
Win	3–0	Athanasios Barkas	Submission (rear-naked choke)	WMMAA - 5th World MMA Championships 2017	October 6, 2017	2	1:03	Astana, Kazakhstan	2017 WMMAA World Championship heavyweight selection.
Win	2–0	Oswaldo Gil	Submission (guillotine choke)	WMMAA - 5th World MMA Championships 2017	October 6, 2017	1	0:35	Astana, Kazakhstan	2017 WMMAA World Championship heavyweight selection.
Win	1–0	Salimgerey Rasulov	TKO	Russian MMA Union - Championship Final	May 11, 2017	2	4:50	Rostov-on-Don, Russia	

== Freestyle wrestling record ==
Freestyle matches
Res.	Record	Opponent	Score	Date	Event	Location
Loss	0–1	(Iran) Pouya Rahmani	TF 3–10	September 5, 2026	RAF Moscow	(United States) Moscow, Russia

== See also ==
- List of male mixed martial artists
- List of ONE Championship champions
- Double champions in MMA

== Notes ==
Awards and achievements
Preceded by Reinier de Ridder	5th ONE Middleweight Champion; March 1, 2024 – present	Incumbent
Preceded by Reinier de Ridder	4th ONE Light Heavyweight Champion; December 3, 2022 – present	Incumbent
New title	1st ONE Interim Heavyweight Champion; February 11, 2022 – June 23, 2023	Vacant
Preceded by Arjan Bhullar	3rd ONE Heavyweight Champion; June 23, 2023 – November 9, 2024	Succeeded by Oumar Kane
