= ONE 169 =

Combat sport events in 2024

ONE 169: Malykhin vs. Reug Reug
- The poster for ONE 169: Malykhin vs. Reug Reug
- Promotion: ONE Championship
- Date: November 9, 2024
- Venue: Lumpinee Boxing Stadium
- City: Bangkok, Thailand

Event chronology
ONE Friday Fights 86: Kompetch vs. Chartpayak	ONE 169: Malykhin vs. Reug Reug	ONE Friday Fights 87: Kongchai vs. Chokpreecha

ONE 169: Malykhin vs. Reug Reug was a combat sports event produced by ONE Championship that took place on November 9, 2024, at Lumpinee Boxing Stadium in Bangkok, Thailand.

== Background ==
The event was to mark the promotion's first visit to Atlanta and third in United States since ONE 168 in September 2024. However, the event was moved to Bangkok due to partner obligations in Thailand.

A ONE Heavyweight World Championship bout between current champion (also the ONE Middleweight and Light Heavyweight Champion) Anatoly Malykhin and Oumar Kane headlined the event.

In the co-main event took place a ONE Flyweight Muay Thai World Championship bout between current champion Rodtang Jitmuangnon and Jacob Smith. The pair previously met at ONE 157 in May 2022, which Rodtang won by unanimous decision. At the weigh-ins, Rodtang weighed in at 135.5 pounds, 0.5 pounds over the limit. As a result, Rodtang was stripped of the title and only Smith was eligible to win it.

A ONE Lightweight World Championship bout between current champion (also the ONE Welterweight Champion and ONE Lightweight World Grand Prix winner) Christian Lee and undefeated Alibeg Rasulov was scheduled at the event. However, it was announced that the bout was moved to ONE Fight Night 26 on December 7 for unknown reasons.

A ONE Featherweight Muay Thai World Championship bout and trilogy between current champion Tawanchai P.K.Saenchai and Jo Nattawut was scheduled at the event. The pairing first met at ONE Fight Night 15 in the Kickboxing bout, where Tawanchai won by unanimous decision. Their second meeting took place at ONE 167 for the title, where Tawanchai defended the title by controversial majority decision. However, the bout was removed from the event due to Nattawut injury after losing via knockout against Superbon Singha Mawynn at ONE Friday Fights 81.

An inaugural ONE Women's Strawweight Kickboxing World Championship bout between former two-time Glory Women's Super Bantamweight Champion Anissa Meksen and Jackie Buntan took place at the event. The pair was previously expected to headline at ONE Fight Night 23, but Buntan pulled out due to injury.

Also at the weigh-ins, Tagir Khalilov came in at 139.25 pounds, 4.25 pounds over the flyweight limit and he was fined a percentage of his purse went go to Kongthoranee Sor.Sommai.

== Results ==
Fight card (Amazon Prime Video)
Weight class				Method	Round	Time	Notes
Heavyweight	Oumar Kane	def.	Anatoly Malykhin (c)	Decision (split)	5	5:00	(Note: For the ONE Heavyweight World Championship.)
Flyweight Muay Thai	Rodtang Jitmuangnon	def.	Jacob Smith	Decision (unanimous)	5	3:00	(Note: For the vacant ONE Flyweight Muay Thai World Championship. Rodtang missed weight (135.5 lb) and was stripped of the title. Only Smith was eligible to win title.)
Women's Strawweight Kickboxing	Jackie Buntan	def.	Anissa Meksen	Decision (unanimous)	5	3:00	(Note: For the inaugural ONE Women's Strawweight Kickboxing World Championship.)
Flyweight	Adriano Moraes	def.	Danny Kingad	Submission (guillotine choke)	2	4:14
Flyweight Muay Thai	Kongthoranee Sor.Sommai	def.	Tagir Khalilov	Decision (unanimous)	3	3:00	(Note: Khalilov missed weight (139.25 lb).)
Lightweight	Kade Ruotolo	def.	Ahmed Mutjaba	Submission (brabo choke)	1	1:04
Strawweight Kickboxing	Sam-A Gaiyanghadao	def.	Zhang Peimian	Decision (unanimous)	3	3:00
Heavyweight	Marcus Buchecha	def.	Amir Aliakbari	Submission (rear-naked choke)	1	3:15
Featherweight Muay Thai	Mohamed Younes Rabah	def.	Eddie Abasolo	Decision (unanimous)	3	3:00
Women's Atomweight	Ayaka Miura	def.	Macarena Aragon	Submission (scarf hold armlock)	1	2:20
Strawweight Muay Thai	Aliff Sor.Dechapan	def.	Walter Goncalves	Decision (unanimous)	3	3:00

== Bonus awards ==
The following fighters received $50,000 bonuses.

- Performance of the Night: Kade Ruotolo, Marcus Buchecha and Ayaka Miura

== See also ==
- 2024 in ONE Championship
- List of ONE Championship events
- List of current ONE fighters
- ONE Championship Rankings
