= Tun Min Naing =

Burmese boxer and Muay Thai fighter

- Born: Tun Min Naing; Mudon Township, Mon State
- Native name: ထွန်းမင်းနိုင်
- Other names: Sulaiman Looksuan (สุไลมาน ลูกสวน), Toben Sor.Kanitsorn (โทเบน ส.คณิตศร)
- Nationality: Burmese
- Height: 1.65 m (5 ft 5 in)
- Weight: 135 lb (61 kg; 10 st)
- Division: Flyweight
- Style: Muay Thai, Lethwei
- Stance: Orthodox
- Fighting out of: Mudon, Mon State
- Team: LookSuan MuayThai Camp
- Years active: 2015–present

Other information
- Notable relatives: Tun Tun Min, Tun Min Latt, Tun Min Aung

Medal record

Men's Lethwei

Regions and States (C class)
Gold medal – first place	2016 Yangon	-51 kg

Tun Min Naing (Burmese: ထွန်းမင်းနိုင်), also known as Sulaiman Looksuan (Thai: สุไลมาน ลูกสวน), is a Burmese Lethwei and Muay Thai fighter from Myanmar. He is currently signed to ONE Championship, where he competes in the Flyweight division.

== Personal life ==
Tun Min Naing is the eighth child of U Khaing Shwe and Daw Than Aye. He is a Muslim and the cousin of Tun Tun Min, Tun Min Latt and Tun Min Aung.

== Lethwei and Muay Thai career ==
He started his Lethwei career at the age of 13. He won the 2016 Regions and States tournament in the 51 kg class, exceeding his own expectations. His sole loss came at the hands of Tha Pyay Aung, at the 2017 Golden Belt Championship. Though hailed as a young and powerful fighter, he was knocked out in round two by the eventual champion in their weight-class. Tun Min Naing rates his fight Ye Thway Ni in Mandalay among one of his most memorable matches. For about a year from 2017 to 2018, he fought in Thailand to study Muay Thai to improve his technique and to gain experience. He returned to competition in 2022 after a lay-off due to COVID-19 restrictions, a case of pneumonia and the after effects of the coup.

=== ONE Championship ===
In February 2023, Tun Min Naing announced he had signed with ONE Championship. His first fight was against Chaongoh Jitmuangnon, who was riding a 19-fight win streak. He won the fight by technical knockout in the second round and was awarded a 350,000 Thai baht Performance of the Night bonus afterwards. In his emotional post-fight interview, he revealed that he would use the money to help his ailing father get treatment.

He became known as Mr. Roti, since he was selling the popular street food in between training. He was also interviewed by Myanmar Celebrity and addressed some criticism regarding his costume and religion and said he didn't carry the Myanmar flag because he didn't feel confident yet. He is determined to become a champion in ONE Championship.

== Muaythai record ==
Professional Muaythai record
16 Wins, 12 Losses, 1 Draw
Date	Result	Opponent	Event	Location	Method	Round	Time
2026-05-15	Win	(Spain) Juan Martinez	ONE Friday Fights 154, Lumpinee Stadium	Bangkok, Thailand	Decision (unanimous)	3	3:00
2026-03-13	Win	(China) Zhang Jinhu	ONE Friday Fights 146, Lumpinee Stadium	Bangkok, Thailand	TKO (Doctor stoppage)	1	3:00
2024-08-23	Loss	(Thailand) Korpai Sor Yingcharoenkarnchang	ONE Friday Fights 76, Lumpinee Stadium	Bangkok, Thailand	KO (punch)	2	0:16
2024-05-17	Win	(Japan) Tomoki Sato	ONE Friday Fights 63, Lumpinee Stadium	Bangkok, Thailand	Decision (unanimous)	3	3:00
2024-03-09	Loss	(Scotland) Gregor Thom	Suek Jitmuangnon	Nonthaburi province, Thailand	Decision	3	3:00
2024-01-19	Loss	(Malaysia) Kabilan Jelevan	ONE Friday Fights 48, Lumpinee Stadium	Bangkok, Thailand	Decision (majority)	3	3:00
2023-11-17	Win	(United States) Kijani Aytch	ONE Friday Fights 41, Lumpinee Stadium	Bangkok, Thailand	Decision (unanimous)	3	3:00
2023-09-01	Loss	(Thailand) Lahfan Sitwatcharachai	Suek Chaiyapahuyut Muaydee VitheeThai	Surat Thani province, Thailand	Decision	5	3:00
2023-07-14	Loss	(Malaysia) Kabilan Jelevan	ONE Friday Fights 25, Lumpinee Stadium	Bangkok, Thailand	TKO (right hook)	1	2:51
2023-05-12	Win	(Thailand) Pheteak Sor.Thepparat	ONE Friday Fights 16, Lumpinee Stadium	Bangkok, Thailand	TKO (punches)	2	0:20
2023-03-17	Win	(Thailand) Chaongoh Jitmuangnon	ONE Friday Fights 9, Lumpinee Stadium	Bangkok, Thailand	TKO	2	1:30
2023-01-28	Win	(Thailand) Kulabkaw	Muay Dee Withithai	Bangkok, Thailand	TKO	5	
2023-01-07	Win	(Thailand) Mahawet Kor.Saila	Muay Dee Withithai	Bangkok, Thailand	Decision	5	3:00
2022-12-10	Loss	(Thailand) Phetsangtian Tor.Sangtiennoi	Muay Dee Withithai	Bangkok, Thailand	Decision	5	3:00
2022-11-07	Loss	(Thailand) Yodkhunpon Sitkaewprapon	Rajadamnern Stadium	Bangkok, Thailand	Decision	3	3:00
2022-10-01	Win	(Algeria) Abdelmouneme Basta	Fairtex Fight Lumpinee	Bangkok, Thailand	Decision	3	3:00
2022-09-03	Win	(Japan) Yuto Numpornthep	Fairtex Fight	Bangkok, Thailand	Decision	3	3:00
2022-08-14	Win	(Japan) Yuto Numpornthep	Somdet Phra Chao Suea Palace	Ayutthaya, Thailand	Decision	5	
2022-07-15	Loss	(Thailand) Somboonbab TFC Muaythai	Muay Thai Fighter X	Rangsit, Thailand	Decision	5	3:00
2022-06-18	Loss	(Thailand) Padetsuk Fairtex	Fairtex Fight: Domination	Bangkok, Thailand	Decision	3	3:00
2018-07-08	Loss	(Thailand) Hall Saengmorakot	Super Champ	Bangkok, Thailand	Decision	3	3:00
2018-06-01	Win	(Thailand)	Nongnooch Pattaya Boxing Stadium	Chonburi province, Thailand			
2018-04-29	Loss	(Thailand) Nonglek U.F.C. Refresh	Real Hero	Bangkok, Thailand	Decision	1	
2018-02-13	Loss	(Thailand)	Max Muay Thai Fighter	Pattaya, Thailand	KO	1	0:46
2018-01-24	Win	(Thailand) Nontachai Charoemueng	Max Muay Thai The Global Fight	Pattaya, Thailand	TKO	2	
2017-12-20	Win	(Thailand) Changsuek Sor.Niltai	Max Muay Thai Octa Fight	Pattaya, Thailand	KO	1	
2017-11-29	Draw	(Thailand) Changsuek Sor.Niltai	Max Muay Thai Daily Fight	Pattaya, Thailand	Draw	5	3:00
2017-11-10	Win	(Thailand)	Muay Thai Live: Warriors Rising	Bangkok, Thailand		1	
2017-11-01	Win	(Thailand)	Muay Thai Live: Warriors Rising	Bangkok, Thailand			
Legend: Win Loss Draw/No contest Notes

== Lethwei record ==
Professional Lethwei record
3 wins, 1 loss, 15 draws
Date	Result	Opponent	Event	Location	Method	Round	Time
2020-02-12	Draw	(Myanmar) Moe Hmaung	(73rd) Union Day Commemoration	Pyu Township, Myanmar	Draw	5	3:00
2019-12-13	Draw	(Myanmar) Ye Thway Ni	Challenge Fights Mandalay	Mandalay, Myanmar	Draw	5	3:00
2019-11-11	Draw	(Myanmar) Thar Win Tun	New Generation Fights Dedaye	Dedaye Township, Myanmar	Draw	4	3:00
2019-07-21	Draw	(Myanmar) Tauk Shar	Lethwei Fights Ye city	Ye Township, Myanmar	Draw	5	3:00
2019-03-27	Draw	(Thailand) Laempetch Mhooping Aroijungbei	Myanmar vs. Thailand Challenge Fights	Mandalay, Myanmar	Draw	5	3:00
2019-03-16	Draw	(Myanmar) Saw Kyaw Kyar	Challenge Fights Kyainseikgyi	Kyain Seikgyi Township, Myanmar	Draw	5	3:00
2019-02-22	Win	(Myanmar) Saw Thar Nge	WLC 7: Mighty Warriors	Mandalay, Myanmar	Decision (Split)	5	3:00
2019-01-22	Draw	(Myanmar) Byaggha	Challenge Fights Pajinn village	Yebyu Township, Myanmar	Draw	5	3:00
2018-11-21	Draw	(Myanmar) Byaggha	Surfing with the Warriors	Chaungtha, Myanmar	Draw	5	3:00
2018-11-11	Draw	(Myanmar) Daung Phyu	Battle For Glory IV	Mawlamyine, Myanmar	Draw	5	3:00
2018-07-22	Draw	(Myanmar) Kyaw Swar Win	Golden Belt Championship	Yangon, Myanmar	Draw	5	3:00
2017-07-15	Loss	(Myanmar) Tha Pyay Aung	2017 Golden Belt Championship QF	Yangon, Myanmar	TKO	2	2:51
2017-05-28	Draw	(Myanmar) Kyaw Swar Win	Prime Minister's cup, Bago Region	Bago Region, Myanmar	Draw	5	3:00
2017-03-19	Draw	(Myanmar) Thein Naing Tun	Lethwei Fight 2	Yangon, Myanmar	Draw	5	3:00
2016-08-30	Win	(Myanmar) Moe Lay	14th Regions and States Final	Yangon, Myanmar	Decision	3	3:00
Wins 51kg Regions and States gold medal in C class
2016-08-27	Win	(Myanmar) Aung Nay Htoo	14th Regions and States Semi-final	Yangon, Myanmar	Decision	3	3:00
2016-03-04	Draw	(Myanmar) Kyaw Swar Win	GTG Challenge Fights Kandawgyi	Mandalay, Myanmar	Draw	4	3:00
2016-01-17	Draw	(Myanmar) Kyaw Swar Win	Challenge To Myanmar Champion	Yangon, Myanmar	Draw	3	3:00
2015-08-30	Draw	(Myanmar) Phyo Lin Zaw	All Stars Big Fight	Yangon, Myanmar	Draw	3	3:00
Legend: Win Loss Draw/No contest Notes
