= ONE Fight Night 13 =

Combat sport events in 2023

ONE Fight Night 13: Allazov vs. Grigorian
- The poster for ONE Fight Night 13: Allazov vs. Grigorian
- Promotion: ONE Championship
- Date: August 5, 2023
- Venue: Lumpinee Boxing Stadium
- City: Bangkok, Thailand

Event chronology
ONE Friday Fights 27: Tapaokaew vs. Harrison	ONE Fight Night 13: Allazov vs. Grigorian	ONE Friday Fights 28: Kongsuk vs. Jaosuayai

ONE Fight Night 13: Allazov vs. Grigorian was a combat sport event produced by ONE Championship that took place on August 5, 2023, at Lumpinee Boxing Stadium in Bangkok, Thailand.

== Background ==
A ONE Featherweight Kickboxing World Championship bout between current champion Chingiz Allazov and former Glory Lightweight champion Marat Grigorian headlined the event. The pair met for the first time at Glory 7: Milan in 2013, but the fight ended in a no-contest due to an illegal elbow. Their second meeting took place in Levallois-Perret, France in 2014, where Grigorian won by unanimous decision.

A ONE Flyweight Submission Grappling World Championship bout between current champion Mikey Musumeci and current ONE Strawweight Champion Jarred Brooks served as the event's co-headliner.

A heavyweight bout between the multiple-time World IBJJF Jiu-Jitsu champion and ADCC submission fighting World champion Marcus Almeida and Oumar Kane took place at the event.

A featherweight kickboxing bout between the current ONE Featherweight Muay Thai Champion Tawanchai P.K.Saenchai and former Glory Lightweight Champion Davit Kiria took place at the event.

A bantamweight bout between former ONE Bantamweight Champion John Lineker and Kim Jae Woong took place at the event.

A women's atomweight kickboxing bout between Supergirl Jaroonsak and Cristina Morales was expected to take place at the event. However, Morales had to withdraw from the bout after announcing her pregnancy and was replaced by Lara Fernandez.

A lightweight muay thai bout between Liam Nolan and Rungrawee Sitsongpeenong was scheduled for this event. However, Nolan withdrew due to injury and was replaced by Nauzet Trujillo.

At the weigh-ins, John Lineker, Elias Mahmoudi and Rungrawee Sitsongpeenong missed weight. Lineker weighed in at 151 pounds, 6 pounds over the bantamweight limit, Mahmoudi weighed in at 135.25 pounds, 0.25 pounds over the flyweight limit, and Rungrawee weighed in at 174 pounds, 4 pounds over the lightweight limit. All the bouts proceeded at catchweight with each being fined 25% his individual purse, which went to their opponents Kim Jae-woong, Edgar Tabares and Nauzet Trujillo respectively.

== Results ==
Main card (Amazon Prime Video)
Weight class				Method	Round	Time	Notes
Featherweight Kickboxing	Chingiz Allazov (c)	def.	Marat Grigorian	Decision (unanimous) (49–46, 49–46, 49–46)	5	3:00	(Note: For the ONE Featherweight Kickboxing World Championship.)
Flyweight Submission Grappling	Mikey Musumeci (c)	def.	Jarred Brooks	Submission (triangle armbar)	1	7:30	(Note: For the ONE Flyweight Submission Grappling World Championship.)
Featherweight Kickboxing	Tawanchai P.K.Saenchai	def.	Davit Kiria	TKO (arm injury)	3	0:29
Catchweight (151 lb)	John Lineker	def.	Kim Jae-woong	TKO (punches)	3	4:56	(Note: Lineker missed weight (151 lb).)
Catchweight (118 lb) Kickboxing	Supergirl Jaroonsak	def.	Lara Fernandez	Decision (unanimous)	3	3:00
Heavyweight	Oumar Kane	def.	Marcus Almeida	Decision (unanimous)	3	5:00
Catchweight (135.25 lb) Muay Thai	Elias Mahmoudi	def.	Edgar Tabares	TKO (knees)	1	1:38	(Note: Mahmoudi missed weight (135.25 lb).)
Catchweight (180 lb) Submission Grappling	Tye Ruotolo	def.	Dagi Arslanaliev	Submission (rear-naked choke)	1	2:39
Catchweight (174 lbs) Muay Thai	Rungrawee Sitsongpeenong	def.	Nauzet Trujillo	Decision (unanimous)	3	3:00	(Note: Rungrawee missed weight (174 lb).)
Bantamweight	Enkh-Orgil Baatarkhuu	def.	Jhanlo Mark Sangiao	Submission (kimura)	2	2:53

== Bonus awards ==
The following fighters received $50,000 bonuses.

- Performance of the Night: Mikey Musumeci, Tawanchai P.K.Saenchai, Oumar Kane, Tye Ruotolo and Enkh-Orgil Baatarkhuu

== See also ==
- 2023 in ONE Championship
- List of ONE Championship events
- List of current ONE fighters
