= ONE on Prime Video 5 =

Combat sport events in 2022

ONE on Prime Video 5: de Ridder vs. Malykhin
- The poster for ONE on Prime Video 5: de Ridder vs. Malykhin
- Promotion: ONE Championship
- Date: December 3, 2022
- Venue: SM Mall of Asia Arena
- City: Pasay, Philippines

Event chronology
ONE 163: Akimoto vs. Petchtanong	ONE on Prime Video 5: de Ridder vs. Malykhin	ONE 164: Pacio vs. Brooks

ONE on Prime Video 5: de Ridder vs. Malykhin (also known as ONE Fight Night 5) was a Combat sport event produced by ONE Championship. It that took place on December 3, 2022, at the SM Mall of Asia Arena in Pasay, Philippines.

== Background ==
The event competition was announced couple from live ONE on Prime Video 2 by a welterweight bout between former KSW Welterweight and Middleweight Champion Roberto Soldić and undefeated contender Murad Ramazanov.

A ONE Light Heavyweight World Championship bout between current champion Reinier de Ridder (also current ONE Middleweight World Champion) and current interim ONE Heavyweight champion Anatoly Malykhin headlined the event.

A ONE Featherweight Kickboxing World Championship bout between current champion Superbon Singha Mawynn and former K-1 Super Welterweight Champion (also 2022 ONE Featherweight Kickboxing World Grand Prix Champion) Chingiz Allazov was expected to take place at the event. The pairing was previously scheduled to co-main event at ONE on Prime Video 2, but Allazov forced to withdraw from the event due to an injury. In turn, Superbon forced to withdraw due to came down with an illness and the bout was moved to headline at ONE on Prime Video 6 on January 14, 2023.

A ONE Women's Atomweight Muay Thai World Championship unification bout between current champion Allycia Rodrigues and interim champion Janet Todd was expected to take place at the event. However on November 30, Todd pulled out from the event due to tests positive for COVID-19 and the bout was postponed.

A ONE Lightweight Submission Grappling World Championship bout between current champion Kade Ruotolo (also the 2022 ADCC World Championship 77kg gold medalist) and promotional newcomer Matheus Gabriel that took place the event.

At the weigh-ins, Jackie Buntan fails hydration four times and must negotiate a catchweight; she weighed in at 130 pounds, 5 pounds over the strawweight limit. The bout proceeded at catchweight with Buntan being fined 20% of his purse, which went to his opponent Amber Kitchen.

== Results ==
Main card (Amazon Prime Video)
Weight class				Method	Round	Time	Notes
Light Heavyweight	Anatoly Malykhin	def.	Reinier de Ridder (c)	KO (punches)	1	4:35	(Note: For the ONE Light Heavyweight World Championship.)
Lightweight Submission Grappling	Kade Ruotolo (c)	def.	Matheus Gabriel	Decision (unanimous)	1	10:00	(Note: For the ONE Lightweight Submission Grappling World Championship.)
Welterweight	Roberto Soldić	vs.	Murad Ramazanov	No Contest (accidental knee to groin)	1	3:01	(Note: Accidental knee to the groin rendered Soldić unable to continue.)
Catchweight (130 lbs) Muay Thai	Jackie Buntan	def.	Amber Kitchen	Decision (unanimous)	3	3:00	(Note: Buntan missed weight (130 lbs).)
Lightweight	Lowen Tynanes	def.	Park Dae-sung	Decision (split)	3	5:00
Lead card (YouTube / Watch ONE)
Lightweight	Edson Marques	def.	Eduard Folayang	TKO (punches)	2	2:53
Catchweight (180 lbs) Submission Grappling	Tye Ruotolo	def.	Marat Gafurov	Submission (triangle armbar)	1	5:09
Heavyweight	Oumar Kane	def.	Jasur Mirzamukhamedov	Decision (unanimous)	3	5:00
Women's Atomweight	Denice Zamboanga	def.	Lin Heqin	Decision (split)	3	5:00

== Bonus awards ==
The following fighters were awarded bonuses:

- Performance of the Night ($100,000): Anatoly Malykhin
- Performance of the Night ($50,000): Edson Marques and Tye Ruotolo

== See also ==
- 2022 in ONE Championship
- List of ONE Championship events
- List of current ONE fighters
