= ONE 161 =

Combat sport events in 2022

ONE 161: Petchmorakot vs. Tawanchai
- The poster for ONE 161: Petchmorakot vs. Tawanchai
- Promotion: ONE Championship
- Date: September 29, 2022
- Venue: Singapore Indoor Stadium
- City: Kallang, Singapore

Event chronology
ONE on Prime Video 1: Moraes vs. Johnson 2	ONE 161: Petchmorakot vs. Tawanchai	ONE on Prime Video 2: Xiong vs. Lee 3

ONE 161: Petchmorakot vs. Tawanchai was a Combat sport event produced by ONE Championship that took place on September 29, 2022 at the Singapore Indoor Stadium in Kallang, Singapore.

== Background ==
The event was originally expected to be headlined by a ONE Heavyweight World Championship title unification bout between current champion Arjan Bhullar and interim champion Anatoly Malykhin. However, Bhullar withdraw due to suffering an injury in training, It was announced that Bhullar had surgery on the arm two weeks ago and the bout was cancelled.

A ONE Featherweight Muay Thai World Championship bout between current champion Petchmorakot Petchyindee and #1 ranked contender Tawanchai P.K.Saenchai was expected to the co-main event. They were elevated to main event status in August after the cancellation of the original headliner.

This event has announced ONE Heavyweight Kickboxing World Grand Prix Tournament, There are four-man fighters in the tournament featured current ONE Light Heavyweight Kickboxing World Champion Roman Kryklia, former UFC veteran Guto Inocente, Iraj Azizpour and Bruno Chaves that took place in the semifinal tournament.

A flyweight bout between former ONE Flyweight Championship challenger Yuya Wakamatsu and Xie Wei was scheduled for the event. However, Xie was removed from the bout for undisclosed reasons and replaced by Wang Shuo.

At the weigh-ins, Han Zihao weighed in at 153.75 lb, 8.75 lb over the bantamweight non-title fight limit of 145 pounds. the bout agreed to moved to the featherweight division (145–155 lbs) where Han was fined 30%, which went to Ferrari Fairtex. Wang Shuo came in at 139.5 pounds, 3.5 pounds over the flyweight non-title limit. The bout was later scrapped after Wang Shuo pulled out of the bout.

== Results ==
Main card (YouTube / Watch ONE)
Weight class				Method	Round	Time	Notes
Featherweight Muay Thai	Tawanchai P.K.Saenchai	def.	Petchmorakot Petchyindee (c)	Decision (unanimous) (49–47, 50–45, 49–46)	5	3:00	(Note: For the ONE Featherweight Muay Thai World Championship.)
Heavyweight Kickboxing	Roman Kryklia	def.	Guto Inocente	TKO (head kick)	1	0:52	(Note: ONE Heavyweight Kickboxing World Grand Prix Tournament Semi-Final bout.)
Heavyweight Kickboxing	Iraj Azizpour	def.	Bruno Chaves	Decision (unanimous)	3	3:00	(Note: ONE Heavyweight Kickboxing World Grand Prix Tournament Semi-Final bout.)
Lightweight	Saygid Izagakhmaev	def.	Zhang Lipeng	Decision (unanimous)	3	5:00
Women's Atomweight	Tiffany Teo	def.	Ritu Phogat	Submission (rear-naked choke)	1	4:52
Heavyweight	Oumar Kane	def.	Batradz Gazzaev	TKO (punches)	2	2:15
Lead card (YouTube / Watch ONE)
Bantamweight Muay Thai	Alaverdi Ramazanov	def.	Capitan Petchyindee	Decision (split)	3	3:00
Bantamweight Muay Thai	Sangmanee P.K.Saenchai	def.	Zhang Chenglong	Decision (split)	3	3:00
Featherweight Muay Thai	Ferrari Fairtex	def.	Han Zihao	Decision (unanimous)	3	3:00	(Note: Originally announced as a Bantamweight bout, after change to Featherweight bout due to Han Zihao can't do the weight according to the bantamweight division (135 - 145 lbs).)
Bantamweight Submission Grappling	Rodrigo Marello	def.	Ruslan Bagdasarian	Submission (ankle lock)	1	0:15
Middleweight	Ali Foladi	def.	Matheus Felipe	KO (punch)	1	4:20

== Bonus awards ==
The following fighters received $50,000 bonuses.

- Performance of the Night: Roman Kryklia, Tiffany Teo and Rodrigo Marello

== See also ==
- 2022 in ONE Championship
- List of ONE Championship events
- List of current ONE fighters
