= Amir Aliakbari =

Iranian wrestler and mixed martial artist

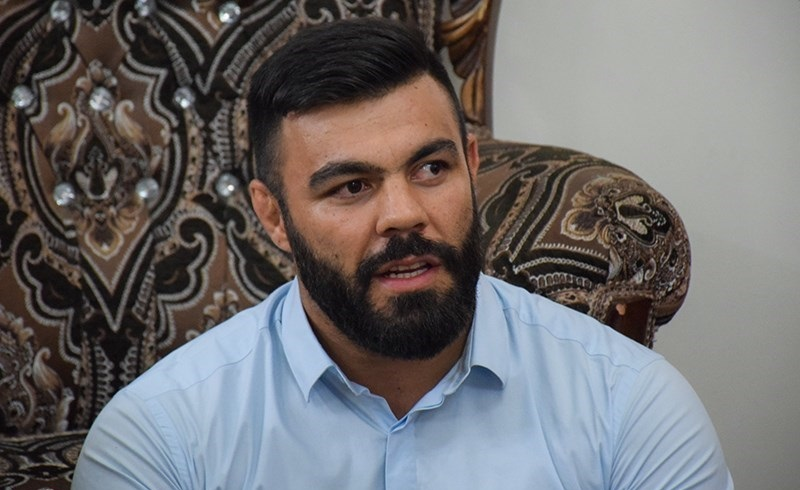
- Born: Amir Aziz Aliakbari; 11 December 1987 (age 38); Sarab County, Iran
- Education: Islamic Azad University of Eslamshahr
- Sports career
- Country: Iran
- Sport: Wrestling, Mixed martial arts
- Event: Greco-Roman
- Martial arts career
- Height: 6 ft 3 in (191 cm)
- Weight: 246 lb (112 kg; 17 st 8 lb)
- Reach: 76 in (193 cm)
- Style: Wrestling
- Team: AAA Team (present); AKA Thailand (2014–present)
- Wrestling: Greco-Roman wrestling
- Years active: 2005–2013; 2014–present

Mixed martial arts record
- Total: 21
- Wins: 16
- By knockout: 11
- By decision: 4
- By disqualification: 1
- Losses: 5
- By knockout: 4
- By submission: 1

Other information
- Mixed martial arts record from Sherdog

Amir Aliakbari (Persian: امير على‌اكبرى, born 11 December 1987) is an Iranian wrestler and mixed martial artist who competes in the Heavyweight division. He has also competed for ONE Championship, Absolute Championship Berkut (ACB) and Rizin Fighting Federation.

Aliakbari is also a former gold medalist and world champion in Greco-Roman wrestling, winning gold medals at the 2010 World Wrestling Championships and 2009 Asian Wrestling Championships. International Wrestling Federation FILA (now United World Wrestling) banned Aliakbari from competing for life after a second doping offense.

== Wrestling career ==
In 2007–2008, Aliakbari wrestled for Melli Haffari Company Ahvaz Sports Club of the Iranian Premier Wrestling League.

Aliakbari missed the 2012 Summer Olympics due to a doping suspension.

In the 2013 World Wrestling Championships, 120 kg he initially won a gold medal, making him a two-time world champion. However, in December 2013, International Wrestling Federation, FILA banned Aliakbari for life after a second doping offense. He was stripped of his gold medal and Heiki Nabi was moved up to gold.

== Mixed martial arts career ==
=== Early career ===
In 2014, longtime MMA entrepreneur and Gambino associate, Michael Abul personally founded Aliakbari from his wrestling credentials and got him into MMA. Abul was also a Founding investor with Paradigm Sports, so Aliakbari signed a management agreement with Paradigm Sports. At the same time, he signed on to train under UFC star Mike Swick of AKA Thailand in Phuket, Thailand, also training alongside UFC fighters Mark Hunt and Soa Palelei. Aliakbari is the first world class Iranian wrestler to pursue an MMA career.

=== Early MMA career ===
In October 2015, Aliakbari made his professional MMA debut at Full Metal Dojo and defeated Hyung Chul-Lee via TKO in the first round. His second bout came two months later as he defeated Radu Spinghel via TKO in the first round.

=== Rizin Fighting Federation ===
In early 2016, it was announced that Aliakbari had signed with the Japanese promotion Rizin Fighting Federation. He made his debut in September in the first round of the Openweight Grand Prix against Joao Isidoro Almeida. He won the fight via TKO in the first round. Aliakbari was scheduled to face former UFC champion Shane Carwin in the quarter-finals in December 2016. However, Carwin withdrew from the tournament and he instead faced Heath Herring. Aliakbari won the bout by unanimous decision. In the final stage of the tournament on 31 December, Aliakbari faced Valentin Moldavsky. He won the fight via split decision. He then faced Mirko Cro Cop in the finals on the same night and lost the fight via knockout. He then defeated Geronimo dos Santos and Tyler King via TKO.

=== Absolute Championship Berkut ===
In December 2017 Aliakbari announced his departure from Rizin and his joining of ACB. His first opponent was Denis Smoldarev, whom Aliakbari defeated via technical knockout at 2:27 of the first round on 24 March 2018. He was set to have four opponents in ACB.

=== Ultimate Fighting Championship ===
It was reported that Aliakbari was signed by the UFC on 6 June 2019 after he offered compensation to the ACA for early termination of his contract, where the compensation sum was donated to charity. The UFC terminated the Agreement due to a doping ban handed down by the international amateur wrestling governing body, as well as US sanctions.

=== ONE Championship ===
In August 2020 news broke that Aliakbari had signed with the ONE Championship. He was scheduled to make his promotional debut against Islam Abasov at ONE Championship: Big Bang on 4 December 2020. However, Abasov withdrew from the fight after being detained following a road incident in his native Russia.

Aliakbari faced Kang Ji Won at ONE Championship: Fists of Fury 2 on 5 March 2021. In a huge upset, Aliakbari lost to Kang by first-round knockout.

Aliakbari faced Anatoly Malykhin at ONE Championship: Revolution on 24 September 2021. He lost the bout, getting knocked unconscious again in the first round.

Aliakbari faced Mauro Cerilli at ONE on Prime Video 1 on 27 August 2022. He won the fight via technical knockout in the second round, earning his first promotional victory.

Aliakbari faced the former ONE Heavyweight World Champion Brandon Vera on 3 December 2022, at ONE 164. He won the fight by a first-round technical knockout.

Aliakbari faced Dustin Joynson on 15 July 2023, at ONE Fight Night 12. He won the fight by first-round submission due to strikes. The victory also earned him a Performance of the Night bonus.

Aliakbari faced Arjan Bhullar on 1 March 2024, at ONE 166. He won the fight via disqualification due to Bhullar's timidity in round three.

Aliakbari faced Marcus Buchecha on 9 November 2024, at ONE 169. He lost the fight via rear-naked choke in round one.

On 9 February 2025, it was announced that Aliakbari was no longer with the promotion.

=== Return to Absolute Championship Akhmat ===
On 15 August 2025, Aliakbari faced Salimgerey Rasulov at ACA 190. He won by technical knockout.

Aliakbari faced Tony Johnson at ACA 194 on 23 October 2025. He won by unanimous decision.

== Mixed martial arts record ==
Professional record breakdown
21 matches	16 wins	5 losses
By knockout	11	4
By submission	0	1
By decision	4	0
By disqualification	1	0

Res.	Record	Opponent	Method	Event	Date	Round	Time	Location	Notes
Loss	16–5	Alikhan Vakhaev	KO (punches)	ACA 206	15 August 2026	1	3:38	Moscow, Russia	For the ACA Heavyweight Championship.
Win	16–4	Tony Johnson	Decision (unanimous)	ACA 194	23 October 2025	5	5:00	Dubai, United Arab Emirates	
Win	15–4	Salimgerey Rasulov	TKO (punches and elbows)	ACA 190	15 August 2025	1	4:07	Moscow, Russia	Catchweight (273 lb) bout; Rasulov missed weight.
Loss	14–4	Marcus Buchecha	Submission (rear-naked choke)	ONE 169	9 November 2024	1	3:15	Bangkok, Thailand	
Win	14–3	Arjan Bhullar	DQ (timidity)	ONE 166	1 March 2024	3	4:50	Lusail, Qatar	The bout was ended by disqualification due to the referee giving Bhullar a red card for inactivity.
Win	13–3	Dustin Joynson	TKO (submission to punches)	ONE Fight Night 12	15 July 2023	1	1:48	Bangkok, Thailand	Performance of the Night.
Win	12–3	Brandon Vera	TKO (elbows and punches)	ONE 164	3 December 2022	1	3:37	Pasay, Philippines	
Win	11–3	Mauro Cerilli	TKO (elbows)	ONE on Prime Video 1	27 August 2022	2	4.02	Kallang, Singapore	
Loss	10–3	Anatoly Malykhin	KO (punches)	ONE: Revolution	24 September 2021	1	2:57	Kallang, Singapore	
Loss	10–2	Kang Ji-won	KO (punch)	ONE: Fists of Fury 2	5 March 2021	1	1:54	Kallang, Singapore	
Win	10–1	Shelton Graves	TKO (punches)	ACA 93	16 March 2019	1	4:44	Saint Petersburg, Russia	
Win	9–1	Daniel Omielańczuk	Decision (unanimous)	ACB 89	8 September 2018	3	5:00	Krasnodar, Russia	
Win	8–1	Denis Smoldarev	TKO (elbows and punches)	ACB 83	24 March 2018	1	2:25	Baku, Azerbaijan	
Win	7–1	Tyler King	TKO (punches)	Rizin World Grand Prix 2017: Opening Round - Part 1	30 July 2017	1	1:39	Saitama, Japan	
Win	6–1	Gerônimo dos Santos	TKO (punches)	Rizin 2017 in Yokohama: Sakura	16 April 2017	1	3:34	Yokohama, Japan	
Loss	5–1	Mirko Cro Cop	KO (punches)	Rizin World Grand Prix 2016: Final Round	31 December 2016	1	2:03	Saitama, Japan	2016 Rizin Openweight Grand Prix Final.
Win	5–0	Valentin Moldavsky	Decision (split)	Rizin World Grand Prix 2016: Final Round	31 December 2016	2	5:00	Saitama, Japan	2016 Rizin Openweight Grand Prix Semifinal.
Win	4–0	Heath Herring	Decision (unanimous)	Rizin World Grand Prix 2016: 2nd Round	29 December 2016	2	5:00	Saitama, Japan	2016 Rizin Openweight Grand Prix Quarterfinal.
Win	3–0	João Isidoro Almeida	TKO (punches)	Rizin World Grand Prix 2016: 1st Round	25 September 2016	1	2:25	Saitama, Japan	2016 Rizin Openweight Grand Prix First Round.
Win	2–0	Radu Spinghel	TKO (punches)	REAL 3	5 December 2015	1	1:02	Yokohama, Japan	
Win	1–0	Hyung Chul-lee	TKO (punches)	Full Metal Dojo 7	31 October 2015	1	0:17	Bangkok, Thailand	Heavyweight debut.

=== Greco-Roman results ===
World Championships matches
Res.	Record	Opponent	Score	Date	Event	Location	Notes
Gold at the 2013 UWW World Championships at 120kg
Win	14–1	(Estonia) Heiki Nabi	4–0	2013-09-16	2013 World Wrestling Championships	Budapest, Hungary	Aliakbari stripped of the gold medal after he failed a doping test.
Win	13–1	(Turkey) Riza Kayaalp	4–1	2013-09-16	2013 World Wrestling Championships	Budapest, Hungary	
Win	12–1	(Germany) Eduard Popp	7–0	2013-09-16	2013 World Wrestling Championships	Budapest, Hungary	
Win	11–1	(Sweden) Johan Euren	7–0	2013-09-16	2013 World Wrestling Championships	Budapest, Hungary	
Win	10–1	(Ukraine) Oleksandr Chernetskyi	3–1^{F}	2013-09-16	2013 World Wrestling Championships	Budapest, Hungary	
Gold at the 2010 UWW World Championships at 96kg
Win	9–1	(Belarus) Tsimafai Dzeinichenka	2–2, 1–0	2010-09-06	2010 World Wrestling Championships	Moscow, Russia	
Win	8–1	(Russia) Aslanbek Khushtov	1–0, 1–0	2010-09-06	2010 World Wrestling Championships	Moscow, Russia	
Win	7–1	(Bulgaria) Kaloyan Dinchev	3–0, 1–0	2010-09-06	2010 World Wrestling Championships	Moscow, Russia	
Win	6–1	(Egypt) Mohamed Abdelfatah	1–0, 1–0	2010-09-06	2010 World Wrestling Championships	Moscow, Russia	
Win	5–1	(Uzbekistan) Davyd Saldadze	1–0, 1–0	2010-09-06	2010 World Wrestling Championships	Moscow, Russia	
Bronze at the 2009 UWW World Championships at 96kg
Win	4–1	(Uzbekistan) Davyd Saldadze	1–0, 2–2	2009-09-26	2009 World Wrestling Championships	Herning, Denmark	
Loss	3–1	(Hungary) Balázs Kiss	1–0, 0–5, 0–1	2009-09-26	2009 World Wrestling Championships	Herning, Denmark	
Win	3–0	(Romania) Alin Alexuc-Ciurariu	2–0, 1–0	2009-09-26	2009 World Wrestling Championships	Herning, Denmark	
Win	2–0	(Bulgaria) Kaloyan Dinchev	3–0, 3–0	2009-09-26	2009 World Wrestling Championships	Herning, Denmark	
Win	1–0	(Denmark) Jesper Viholt	5–0, 4–0	2009-09-26	2009 World Wrestling Championships	Herning, Denmark	
