= ONE on Prime Video 1 =

ONE Championship combat sport events broadcast live on Amazon Prime

ONE on Prime Video 1: Moraes vs. Johnson 2
- The poster for ONE on Prime Video 1: Moraes vs. Johnson 2
- Promotion: ONE Championship
- Date: August 27, 2022
- Venue: Singapore Indoor Stadium
- City: Kallang, Singapore

Event chronology
ONE 160: Ok vs. Lee 2	ONE on Prime Video 1: Moraes vs. Johnson 2	ONE 161: Petchmorakot vs. Tawanchai

ONE on Prime Video also known as ONE Fight Night refers to ONE Championship events broadcast live on Amazon Prime during prime time hours in the United States and Canada.

== Background ==
The debut event of the series featured the ONE Flyweight World Championship rematch between current three-time champion Adriano Moraes and former UFC Flyweight Champion (also 2019 ONE Flyweight World Grand Prix Champion) Demetrious Johnson. The pair previously fought at ONE on TNT 1 in April 2021 where Moraes defeated Johnson by KO in Round 2. A ONE Bantamweight Muay Thai World Championship bout between current champion Nong-O Gaiyanghadao and Liam Harrison was the co-main event at the show.

The event was to feature a semi-final of the ONE Flyweight Muay Thai World Grand Prix between current ONE Flyweight Muay Thai World Champion Rodtang Jitmuangnon and Savvas Michael with the winner advancing to the World Grand Prix final. However, Rodtang was forced to withdraw due to failed to provide a sample for the organization’s mandatory hydration test and was not permitted to weigh in and was replaced by Panpayak Jitmuangnon who scheduled against Sherzod Kabutov in preliminary card.

A Flyweight Muay Thai bout between former ONE Flyweight Muay Thai World Champion Jonathan Haggerty and Amir Naseri was expected to take place at the event. However, Haggerty forced to withdraw from the contest due to a non-COVID related illness and the bout was cancelled.

At the weigh-ins, two fighters missed weight for their respective bouts. Itsuki Hirata weighed in at 119.25 pounds, 4.25 lbs over the Atomweight non-title fight limit. Zebaztian Kadestam weighed in at 188.5 pounds, 3.5 lbs over the Welterweight non-title fight limit. Both bouts proceeded at catchweight. Kadestam was fined 30% of their purse, which went to their opponent Iuri Lapicus; Hirata was fined 50% of their purse, which went to their opponent Lin Heqin.

== Results ==
Main card (Amazon Prime Video)
Weight class				Method	Round	Time	Notes
Flyweight	Demetrious Johnson	def.	Adriano Moraes (c)	KO (flying knee)	4	3:50	(Note: For the ONE Flyweight World Championship.)
Bantamweight Muay Thai	Nong-O Gaiyanghadao (c)	def.	Liam Harrison	TKO (leg kick)	1	2:10	(Note: For the ONE Bantamweight Muay Thai World Championship.)
Flyweight Muay Thai	Panpayak Jitmuangnon	def.	Savvas Michael	KO (head kick)	2	0:10	(Note: ONE Flyweight Muay Thai World Grand Prix Tournament Semi-Final bout.)
Heavyweight	Marcus Almeida	def.	Kirill Grishenko	Submission (heel hook)	1	1:04
Heavyweight	Amir Aliakbari	def.	Mauro Cerilli	TKO (elbows)	2	4:02
Lead card (YouTube/Watch ONE)
Flyweight Muay Thai	Superlek Kiatmookao	def.	Walter Goncalves	KO (elbow)	1	1:35	(Note: ONE Flyweight Muay Thai World Grand Prix Tournament Semi-Final bout.)
Catchweight (128 lbs) Muay Thai	Diandra Martin	def.	Amber Kitchen	Decision (unanimous)	3	3:00
Catchweight (119.25 lbs)	Itsuki Hirata	def.	Lin Heqin	Decision (unanimous)	3	5:00	(Note: Hirata missed weight (119.25 lbs).)
Catchweight (188.5 lbs)	Zebaztian Kadestam	def.	Iuri Lapicus	KO (punch)	1	0:57	(Note: Kadestam missed weight (188.5 lbs).)

== Bonus awards ==
The following fighters received $50,000 bonuses.

- Performance of the Night: Demetrious Johnson, Nong-O Gaiyanghadao, Panpayak Jitmuangnon, Marcus Almeida and Superlek Kiatmuu9

== See also ==
- 2022 in ONE Championship
- List of ONE Championship events
- List of current ONE fighters
