= ONE 158 =

Combat sport events in 2022

ONE 158: Tawanchai vs. Larsen
- The poster for ONE 158: Tawanchai vs. Larsen
- Promotion: ONE Championship
- Date: June 3, 2022
- Venue: Singapore Indoor Stadium
- City: Kallang, Singapore

Event chronology
ONE 157: Petchmorakot vs. Vienot	ONE 158: Tawanchai vs. Larsen	ONE 159: de Ridder vs. Bigdash

ONE 158: Tawanchai vs. Larsen was a combat sports event produced by ONE Championship that took place on June 3, 2022, at the Singapore Indoor Stadium in Kallang, Singapore.

== Background ==
A ONE Strawweight Championship bout between current two-time champion Joshua Pacio and Jarred Brooks was originally expected to headline the event. However, Brooks withdrew with injury. They are now to headline at ONE 164 on December 3. A featherweight muay thai bout between Tawanchai P.K. Saenchai and Niclas Larsen was promoted to the main event status.

In the co-main event, a bantamweight bout between Kwon Won Il and Fabrício Andrade took place at the event, who is next for a ONE bantamweight title.

A heavyweight kickboxing bout between Rade Opačić and Guto Inocente took place at this event. The pairing was previously scheduled to meet at ONE 157, but the bout was postponed to this event due to Inocente tested positive for COVID-19.

== Results ==
Main Card (YouTube / Watch ONE)
Weight class				Method	Round	Time	Notes
Featherweight Muay Thai	Tawanchai P.K.Saenchai	def.	Niclas Larsen	KO (punch)	2	1:42
Bantamweight	Fabrício Andrade	def.	Kwon Won-il	KO (body kick)	1	1:02
Flyweight	Reece McLaren	def.	Xie Wei	Submission (rear-naked choke)	1	3:42
Flyweight	Kairat Akhmetov	def.	Tatsumitsu Wada	Decision (unanimous)	3	5:00
Heavyweight Kickboxing	Guto Inocente	def.	Rade Opačić	KO (punch to the body)	1	2:33
Strawweight	Alex Silva	def.	Adrian Mattheis	Submission (heel hook)	1	3:34
Lead Card (YouTube / Watch ONE)
Flyweight	Gurdarshan Mangat	def.	Yodkaikaew Fairtex	Decision (split)	3	5:00
Lightweight Kickboxing	Constantin Rusu	def.	Marouan Toutouh	Decision (unanimous)	3	3:00
Heavyweight	Marcus Almeida	def.	Simon Carson	TKO (punches)	1	2:24
Heavyweight	Odie Delaney	def.	Mehdi Barghi	Submission (straight armlock)	2	2:22
Heavyweight	Jasur Mirzamukhamedov	def.	Duke Didier	Decision (split)	3	5:00
Women's Atomweight	Jenelyn Olsim	def.	Julie Merzabarba	Decision (split)	3	5:00
Lightweight	Edson Marques	def.	Kim Kyung-lock	Decision (unanimous)	3	5:00

== Bonus awards ==
The following fighters were awarded bonuses:

- $50,000 Performance of the Night: Alex Silva, Fabricio Andrade and Tawanchai P.K.Saenchai

== See also ==
- 2022 in ONE Championship
- List of ONE Championship events
- List of current ONE fighters
