= ONE 164 =

Combat sport events in 2022

ONE 164: Pacio vs. Brooks
- The poster for ONE 164: Pacio vs. Brooks
- Promotion: ONE Championship
- Date: December 3, 2022
- Venue: SM Mall of Asia Arena
- City: Pasay, Philippines

Event chronology
ONE on Prime Video 5: de Ridder vs. Malykhin	ONE 164: Pacio vs. Brooks	ONE Fight Night 6: Superbon vs. Allazov

ONE 164: Pacio vs. Brooks was a Combat sport event produced by ONE Championship that took place on December 3, 2022, at the SM Mall of Asia Arena in Pasay, Philippines.

== Background ==
SM Mall of Asia Arena, Pasay, Philippines

This is a competition with two events on December 3, is ONE on Prime Video 5 and this event marked the promotion's return to SM Mall of Asia Arena in Pasay for the first time since ONE: Fire & Fury in January 2020 and the event was headlined by a ONE Strawweight World Championship bout between current two-time champion Joshua Pacio and Jarred Brooks. The previously scheduled to headlined at ONE 158, but the fight was postponed due to Brooks was an injury.

The ONE Flyweight Muay Thai World Grand Prix Tournament Final bout between Superlek Kiatmuu9 and Panpayak Jitmuangnon that took place at the event. They met previously 7 times in muay thai at Rajadamnern Stadium and Phetchbuncha Stadium, with Panpayak winning four fight encounters, Superlek winning two fight and one fight ended from draw. The pairing was previously scheduled to ONE on Prime Video 3, but Superlek withdrawn from the event due to training injuries and the bout was moved to the event.

A flyweight bout between former ONE Flyweight World Championship challenger Danny Kingad and Gurdarshan Mangat was scheduled for the event. However, Mangat withdrew due to undisclosed injury and the bout was scrapped.

A bantamweight bout between Jhanlo Mark Sangiao and Matias Farinelli was expected to take place at the event. However, Farinelli has been removed from the card due to tested positive for COVID-19 and was replaced by promotional newcomer Anacleto Lauron at a catchweight of 150 pounds.

At weigh-ins, Superlek Kiatmuu9, Panpayak Jitmuangnon, Anacleto Lauron and Meng Bo all failed hydration test and were forced to take catchweights. Superlek weighed in at 135.25 lbs, 0.25 pounds over the limit, Panpayak came in at 138 lbs, 3 pounds over the flyweight limit, Lauron weighted in at 156.25 lbs, 6.25 pounds over the 150 pounds catchweight bout, and Meng weighed in at 130.75 lbs, 5.75 pounds over the limit. The bout proceeded at catchweight with Meng being fined 20% of his purse, which went to his opponent Jenelyn Olsim, Lauron must deduct the fined as agreed pay compensation in terms of weight which went to his opponent Jhanlo Mark Sangiao, but this time Sangiao refuses to accept compensation. Superlek and Panpayak scheduled to the ONE Flyweight Muay Thai World Grand Prix final but to both were unable to make weight in the flyweight (125 – 135 lbs) and the bout agreed to 138 lbs catchweight.

== Results ==
Main card (YouTube / Watch ONE)
Weight class				Method	Round	Time	Notes
Strawweight	Jarred Brooks	def.	Joshua Pacio (c)	Decision (unanimous)	5	5:00	(Note: For the ONE Strawweight World Championship.)
Catchweight (138 lbs) Muay Thai	Superlek Kiatmuu9	def.	Panpayak Jitmuangnon	Decision (split)	3	3:00	(Note: ONE Flyweight Muay Thai World Grand Prix Tournament Final bout. The pair failed to make weight in the flyweight division and the tournament will not be provided belt, agreed to compete in the 138 lbs catchweight.)
Heavyweight	Amir Aliakbari	def.	Brandon Vera	TKO (elbows and punches)	1	3:37
Flyweight	Hu Yong	def.	Geje Eustaquio	KO (punch)	1	4:43
Bantamweight	Jeremy Pacatiw	def.	Tial Thang	Submission (triangle choke)	2	1:17
Bantamweight	Drex Zamboanga	def.	Adonis Sevilleno	Decision (unanimous)	3	5:00
Lead card (YouTube / Watch ONE)
Catchweight (156.25 lbs)	Jhanlo Mark Sangiao	def.	Anacleto Lauron	Submission (rear-naked choke)	1	1:48	(Note: Lauron missed weight (156.25 lbs))
Flyweight Muay Thai	Tagir Khalilov	def.	Chorfah Tor.Sangtiennoi	TKO (punch)	1	2:29
Women's Atomweight Muay Thai	Lara Fernandez	def.	Dangkongfah Banchamek	Decision (split)	3	3:00
Catchweight (130.75 lbs)	Meng Bo	def.	Jenelyn Olsim	KO (punch and elbows)	1	0:24	(Note: Meng missed weight (130.75 lbs).)

== Bonus awards ==
The following fighters received $50,000 bonuses.

- Performance of the Night: Jeremy Pacatiw, Jhanlo Mark Sangiao and Tagir Khalilov

== See also ==
- 2022 in ONE Championship
- List of ONE Championship events
- List of current ONE fighters
