= ONE Fight Night 23 =

Combat sport events in 2024

ONE Fight Night 23: Ok vs. Rasulov
- The poster for ONE Fight Night 23: Ok vs. Rasulov
- Promotion: ONE Championship
- Date: July 6, 2024
- Venue: Lumpinee Boxing Stadium
- City: Bangkok, Thailand

Event chronology
ONE Friday Fights 69: Kulabdam vs. Anane	ONE Fight Night 23: Ok vs. Rasulov	ONE Friday Fights 70: Focus vs. Irvine

ONE Fight Night 23: Ok vs. Rasulov was a combat sport event produced by ONE Championship that took place on July 6, 2024, at Lumpinee Boxing Stadium in Bangkok, Thailand.

== Background ==
The event was expected to headlined by an inaugural ONE Women's Strawweight Kickboxing World Championship bout between Jackie Buntan and former two-time Glory Women's Super Bantamweight Champion Anissa Meksen. However, Buntan pulled out due to injury and the bout was cancelled.

The new headliner for this event was an interim ONE Lightweight World Championship bout between former champion Ok Rae-yoon and undefeated Alibeg Rasulov. However at the weigh-ins, Rasulov failed multiple attempts to pass hydration and was ineligible for the title, only Ok was eligible to win it.

A bantamweight kickboxing bout between former ONE Bantamweight Kickboxing World Champions Petchtanong Petchfergus and Alaverdi Ramazanov was scheduled for this event. However, the bout was relocated at ONE Friday Fights 68 in a week earlier for undisclosed reasons.

At the weigh-ins, four fighters missed weight:

- Both fighter missed weight between: Ali Saldoev at 139.25 pounds and Black Panther VenumMuayThai at 135.25 pounds, 4.25 pound and 0.25 pound over the flyweight fight limit, respectively.
- Aliff Sor.Dechaphan weighed in at 125.75 pounds, 0.75 pound over the strawweight limit.
- Alexey Balyko weighed in at 151.5 pounds, 6.5 pound over the bantamweight limit.

All threes bouts proceeded at catchweight. Each fighters was fined 30% of his purse which went to their opponents Ellis Badr Barboza and István Ștefan Kóródi respectively (except between Saldoev and Black Panther was not fined of his purse).

== Results ==
Fight card (Amazon Prime Video)
Weight class				Method	Round	Time	Notes
Lightweight	Alibeg Rasulov	def.	Ok Rae-yoon	Decision (unanimous)	5	5:00	(Note: For the interim ONE Lightweight World Championship. Rasulov failed hydration test and was ineligible for the title.)
Bantamweight Muay Thai	Nico Carrillo	def.	Saemapetch Fairtex	TKO (punches)	2	2:03
Catchweight (186 lb) Submission Grappling	Tye Ruotolo	def.	Jozef Chen	Decision (unanimous)	1	10:00
Heavyweight	Kirill Grishenko	def.	Kang Ji-won	Decision (unanimous)	3	5:00
Featherweight Muay Thai	Bampara Kouyate	def.	Luke Lessei	KO (punch)	3	2:08
Flyweight	Tatsumitsu Wada	def.	Xie Wei	Decision (unanimous)	3	5:00
Flyweight Muay Thai	Black Panther VenumMuayThai	def.	Ali Saldoev	KO (head kick)	2	0:23	(Note: Both fighter missed weight: Saldoev (139.25 lb) and Black Panther (135.25 lb).)
Strawweight	Hiroba Minowa	def.	Jeremy Miado	Decision (split)	3	5:00
Strawweight Muay Thai	Ellis Badr Barboza	def.	Aliff Sor.Dechaphan	Decision (split)	3	3:00	(Note: Aliff missed weight (125.75 lb).)
Heavyweight Kickboxing	Oumar Kane	def.	Mamadou Kamara	KO (punches)	1	2:08
Bantamweight Muay Thai	Alexey Balyko	def.	István Ștefan Kóródi	KO (punch)	1	2:42	(Note: Balyko missed weight (151.5 lb).)

== Bonus awards ==
The following fighters received $50,000 bonuses.

- Performance of the Night: Nico Carrillo

== See also ==
- 2024 in ONE Championship
- List of ONE Championship events
- List of current ONE fighters
- ONE Championship Rankings
