= 2022 in ONE Championship =

Mixed martial arts events

Information
- First date: January 14, 2022
- Last date: December 3, 2022

Events
- Total events: 32
- ONE Championship: 15
- ONE on Prime Video: 5
- Road to ONE: 12

Fights
- Total fights: TBD
- Title fights: 33

The year 2022 was the 12th year in the history of the ONE Championship, a mixed martial arts, kickboxing, Muay Thai and submission grappling promotion based in Singapore and later, the Cayman Islands.

== List of events ==
=== ONE Championship ===
ONE Championship
No.	Event	Air date	Venue	Location
1	ONE Championship 150: Heavy Hitters	January 14, 2022	Singapore Indoor Stadium	Singapore
2	ONE Championship 151: Only the Brave	January 28, 2022	Singapore Indoor Stadium	Singapore
3	ONE Championship 152: Bad Blood	February 11, 2022	Singapore Indoor Stadium	Singapore
4	ONE Championship 153: Full Circle	February 25, 2022	Singapore Indoor Stadium	Singapore
5	ONE Championship 154: Lights Out	March 11, 2022	Singapore Indoor Stadium	Singapore
6	ONE Championship 155: X	March 26, 2022	Singapore Indoor Stadium	Singapore
7	ONE 156: Eersel vs. Sadikovic	April 22, 2022	Singapore Indoor Stadium	Singapore
8	ONE 157: Petchmorakot vs. Vienot	May 20, 2022	Singapore Indoor Stadium	Singapore
9	ONE 158: Tawanchai vs. Larsen	June 3, 2022	Singapore Indoor Stadium	Singapore
10	ONE 159: De Ridder vs. Bigdash	July 22, 2022	Singapore Indoor Stadium	Singapore
11	ONE 160: Ok vs. Lee 2	August 26, 2022	Singapore Indoor Stadium	Singapore
12	ONE 161: Petchmorakot vs. Tawanchai	September 29, 2022	Singapore Indoor Stadium	Singapore
13	ONE 162: Zhang vs. Di Bella	October 21, 2022	Axiata Arena	Kuala Lumpur, Malaysia
14	ONE 163: Akimoto vs. Petchtanong	November 19, 2022	Singapore Indoor Stadium	Singapore
15	ONE 164: Pacio vs. Brooks	December 3, 2022	Mall of Asia Arena	Manila, Philippines

=== ONE on Prime Video ===
ONE on Prime Video
No.	Event	Date	Venue	Location
1	ONE on Prime Video 1: Moraes vs. Johnson 2	August 27, 2022	Singapore Indoor Stadium	Singapore
2	ONE on Prime Video 2: Xiong vs. Lee 3	September 30, 2022	Singapore Indoor Stadium	Singapore
3	ONE on Prime Video 3: Lineker vs. Andrade	October 21, 2022	Axiata Arena	Kuala Lumpur, Malaysia
4	ONE on Prime Video 4: Abbasov vs. Lee	November 19, 2022	Singapore Indoor Stadium	Singapore
5	ONE on Prime Video 5: de Ridder vs. Malykhin	December 2, 2022	Mall of Asia Arena	Pasay, Philippines

=== Road to ONE ===
Road to ONE
No.	Event	Date	Venue	Location
1	Road to ONE: Utrecht	March 12, 2022	WLF Studio	Utrecht, Netherlands
2	Road to ONE: RUF 46	March 26, 2022	Celebrity Theatre	(United States) Phoenix, Arizona, USA
3	Road to ONE: RUF 47	May 14, 2022	Celebrity Theatre	(United States) Phoenix, Arizona, USA
4	Road to ONE: Thailand 1	August 6, 2022	Lumpinee Boxing Stadium	Bangkok, Thailand
5	Road to ONE: Thailand 2	August 13, 2022	Lumpinee Boxing Stadium	Bangkok, Thailand
6	Road to ONE: Muay Thai Grand Prix Liverpool	September 10, 2022	Eventim Olympia	Liverpool, England
7	Road to ONE: Thailand 3	September 17, 2022	Lumpinee Boxing Stadium	Bangkok, Thailand
8	Road to ONE: Muay Thai Grand Prix Sheffield	October 1, 2022	Magna Centre	Sheffield, England
9	Road to ONE: BEAST Championship 11	October 8, 2022	Gladstone Showground	Gladstone, Australia
10	Road to ONE: Thailand 4	October 29, 2022	Lumpinee Boxing Stadium	Bangkok, Thailand
11	Road to ONE: Muay Thai Grand Prix London	November 12, 2022	Peninsula Square	London, England
12	Road to ONE: Mongolia	November 26, 2022	Steppe Arena	Ulaanbaatar, Mongolia

== Grand Prix ==
=== 2021/22 Kickboxing Featherweight Grand Prix ===
==== ONE Kickboxing Featherweight Grand Prix bracket ====
Quarter-finals
(Thailand) Sitthichai Sitsongpeenong	SD
(Netherlands) Tayfun Özcan	3r.
(Germany) Enriko Kehl	1r.
(Georgia (country)) Davit Kiria	TKO
(Armenia) Marat Grigorian	TKO
(Netherlands) Andy Souwer	2r.
(France) Samy Sana	1r.
(Belarus) Chingiz Allazov	KO

Semi-finals
(Thailand) Sitthichai Sitsongpeenong	UD
(Georgia (country)) Davit Kiria	3r.
(Thailand) Jo Nattawut^{1}	1r.
(Belarus) Chingiz Allazov	KO

Final
(Thailand) Sitthichai Sitsongpeenong	3r.
(Belarus) Chingiz Allazov	UD

^{1}Marat Grigorian contracted COVID-19 and could not participate in the semi-finals of the Grand Prix. He was subsequently replaced by Jo Nattawut.

=== Muay Thai Flyweight Grand Prix ===
==== ONE Muay Thai Flyweight Grand Prix bracket ====
Quarter-finals
(Thailand) Rodtang Jitmuangnon	UD
(England) Jacob Smith	3r.
(Cyprus) Savvas Michael	UD
(Iran) Amir Naseri	3r.
(Brazil) Walter Goncalves	KO
(Mexico) Josue Cruz^{1}	1r.
(Thailand) Superlek Kiatmuu9	UD
(Japan) Taiki Naito	3r.

Semi-finals
(Thailand) Panpayak Jitmuangnon^{2}	KO
(Cyprus) Savvas Michael	2r.
(Brazil) Walter Goncalves	1r.
(Thailand) Superlek Kiatmuu9	KO

Final
(Thailand) Panpayak Jitmuangnon	3r.
(Thailand) Superlek Kiatmuu9	SP

^{1}Jonathan Haggerty was forced to pull out of his bout with Goncalve due to health issue and could not participate in the quarter-finals of the Grand Prix. He was subsequently replaced by Josue Cruz.

^{2}Rodtang Jitmuangnon was forced to pull out due to not providing a hydration test sample and was not able to weigh in. He was subsequently replaced by Panpayak Jitmuangnon.

=== Kickboxing Heavyweight Grand Prix ===
==== ONE Kickboxing Heavyweight Grand Prix bracket ====
Semi-finals
(Ukraine) Roman Kryklia	TKO
(Brazil) Guto Inocente	1r.
(Iran) Iraj Azizpour	UD
(Brazil) Bruno Chaves	3r.

Final
(Ukraine) Roman Kryklia	TKO
(Iran) Iraj Azizpour	2r.

== Title fights ==
Mixed Martial Arts
#	Weight Class				Method	Round	Time	Event	Notes
1	Women's Strawweight	Xiong Jing Nan (c)	def.	Ayaka Miura	Decision (unanimous)	5	5:00	ONE: Heavy Hitters	For the ONE Women's Strawweight World Championship.
2	Heavyweight	Anatoly Malykhin	def.	Kirill Grishenko	KO (punch)	2	3:42	ONE: Bad Blood	For the interim ONE Heavyweight World Championship.
3	Middleweight	Reinier de Ridder (c)	def.	Kiamrian Abbasov	Submission (arm-triangle choke)	3	0:57	ONE: Full Circle	For the ONE Middleweight World Championship.
4	Bantamweight	John Lineker	def.	Bibiano Fernandes (c)	KO (punch)	2	3:40	ONE: Lights Out	For the ONE Bantamweight World Championship.
5	Featherweight	Thanh Le (c)	def.	Garry Tonon	KO (punches)	1	0:56	ONE: Lights Out	For the ONE Featherweight World Championship.
6	Flyweight	Adriano Moraes (c)	def.	Yuya Wakamatsu	Submission (guillotine choke)	3	3:58	ONE: X	For the ONE Flyweight World Championship.
7	Women's Atomweight	Angela Lee (c)	def.	Stamp Fairtex	Submission (rear-naked choke)	2	4:50	ONE: X	For the ONE Women's Atomweight World Championship.
8	Middleweight	Reinier de Ridder (c)	def.	Vitaly Bigdash	Technical Submission (inverted triangle choke)	1	3:29	ONE 159	For the ONE Middleweight World Championship.
9	Featherweight	Tang Kai	def.	Thanh Le (c)	Decision (unanimous)	5	5:00	ONE 160	For the ONE Featherweight World Championship.
10	Lightweight	Christian Lee	def.	Ok Rae-yoon (c)	TKO (knees)	2	1:00	ONE 160	For the ONE Lightweight World Championship.
11	Flyweight	Demetrious Johnson	def.	Adriano Moraes (c)	KO (flying knee)	4	3:50	ONE on Prime Video 1	For the ONE Flyweight World Championship.
12	Women's Strawweight	Xiong Jing Nan (c)	def.	Angela Lee	Decision (unanimous)	5	5:00	ONE on Prime Video 2	For the ONE Women's Strawweight World Championship.
13	Bantamweight	John Lineker	vs.	Fabrício Andrade	No Contest (accidental groin strike)	3	2:44	ONE on Prime Video 3	For the vacant ONE Bantamweight World Championship (as Lineker missed weight and was stripped of the title, only Andrade was eligible). Accidental groin strike rendered Lineker unable to continue.
14	Welterweight	Christian Lee	def.	Kiamrian Abbasov	TKO (elbows and punches)	4	4:20	ONE on Prime Video 4	For the vacant ONE Welterweight World Championship (as Abbasov missed weight and was stripped of the title, only Lee was eligible).
15	Light Heavyweight	Anatoly Malykhin	def.	Reinier de Ridder (c)	KO (punches)	1	4:35	ONE on Prime Video 5	For the ONE Light Heavyweight World Championship.
16	Strawweight	Jarred Brooks	def.	Joshua Pacio (c)	Decision (unanimous)	5	5:00	ONE 164	For the ONE Strawweight World Championship.

Kickboxing
#	Weight Class				Method	Round	Time	Event	Notes
1	Light Heavyweight Kickboxing	Roman Kryklia (c)	def.	Murat Aygün	KO (body kick and punches)	1	2:32	ONE: Full Circle	For the ONE Light Heavyweight Kickboxing World Championship.
2	Bantamweight Kickboxing	Hiroki Akimoto	def.	Capitan Petchyindee (c)	Decision (unanimous)	5	3:00	ONE: X	For the ONE Bantamweight Kickboxing World Championship.
3	Featherweight Kickboxing	Superbon Singha Mawynn (c)	def.	Marat Grigorian	Decision (unanimous)	5	3:00	ONE: X	For the ONE Featherweight Kickboxing World Championship.
4	Lightweight Kickboxing	Regian Eersel (c)	def.	Arian Sadiković	Decision (unanimous)	5	3:00	ONE 156	For the ONE Lightweight Kickboxing World Championship
5	Strawweight Kickboxing	Jonathan Di Bella	def.	Zhang Peimian	Decision (unanimous)	5	3:00	ONE 162	For the vacant ONE Strawweight Kickboxing World Championship.
6	Bantamweight Kickboxing	Petchtanong Petchfergus	def.	Hiroki Akimoto (c)	Decision (split) (50–46, 47–49, 50–45)	5	3:00	ONE 163	For the ONE Bantamweight Kickboxing World Championship.

Muay Thai
#	Weight Class				Method	Round	Time	Event	Notes
1	Bantamweight Muay Thai	Nong-O Gaiyanghadao (c)	def.	Felipe Lobo	KO (punch)	3	2:15	ONE: X	For the ONE Bantamweight Muay Thai World Championship.
2	Women's Strawweight Muay Thai	Smilla Sundell	def.	Jackie Buntan	Decision (unanimous)	5	3:00	ONE 156	For the inaugural ONE Women's Strawweight Muay Thai World Championship.
3	Strawweight Muay Thai	Joseph Lasiri	def.	Prajanchai P.K.Saenchai (c)	TKO (retirement)	3	3:00	ONE 157	For the ONE Strawweight Muay Thai World Championship.
4	Featherweight Muay Thai	Petchmorakot Petchyindee (c)	def.	Jimmy Vienot	Decision (split)	5	3:00	ONE 157	For the ONE Featherweight Muay Thai World Championship.
5	Women's Atomweight Muay Thai	Janet Todd	def.	Lara Fernandez	Decision (unanimous)	5	3:00	ONE 159	For the interim ONE Women's Atomweight Muay Thai World Championship.
6	Bantamweight Muay Thai	Nong-O Gaiyanghadao (c)	def.	Liam Harrison	TKO (leg kick)	1	2:10	ONE on Prime Video 1	For the ONE Bantamweight Muay Thai World Championship.
7	Featherweight Muay Thai	Tawanchai P.K.Saenchai	def.	Petchmorakot Petchyindee (c)	Decision (unanimous) (49–47, 50–45, 49–46)	5	3:00	ONE 161	For the ONE Featherweight Muay Thai World Championship.
8	Lightweight Muay Thai	Regian Eersel	def.	Sinsamut Klinmee	Decision (split)	5	3:00	ONE on Prime Video 3	For the inaugural ONE Lightweight Muay Thai World Championship.
9	Flyweight Muay Thai	Rodtang Jitmuangnon (c)	def.	Joseph Lasiri	Decision (unanimous) (50–43, 50–43, 50–43)	5	3:00	ONE on Prime Video 4	For the ONE Flyweight Muay Thai World Championship.

Submission Grappling
#	Weight Class				Method	Round	Time	Event	Notes
1	Flyweight Submission Grappling	Mikey Musumeci	def.	Cleber Sousa	Decision (unanimous)	1	10:00	ONE on Prime Video 2	For the inaugural ONE Flyweight Submission Grappling World Championship.
2	Lightweight Submission Grappling	Kade Ruotolo	def.	Uali Kurzhev	Submission (heel hook)	1	4:26	ONE on Prime Video 3	For the inaugural ONE Lightweight Submission Grappling World Championship (as Kurzhev missed weight, only Ruotolo was eligible).
3	Lightweight Submission Grappling	Kade Ruotolo (c)	def.	Matheus Gabriel	Decision (unanimous)	1	10:00	ONE on Prime Video 5	For the ONE Lightweight Submission Grappling World Championship.

== ONE Championship: Heavy Hitters ==
ONE Championship: Heavy Hitters
- Promotion: ONE Championship
- Date: January 14, 2022
- Venue: Singapore Indoor Stadium
- City: Singapore

ONE Championship: Heavy Hitters (also known as ONE 150: Xiong vs. Miura) was a Combat sport event held by ONE Championship on January 14, 2022, at the Singapore Indoor Stadium in Kallang, Singapore.

=== Background ===
The event was headlined by a Women's Strawweight championship bout between reigning Champion Xiong Jingnan and challenger Ayaka Miura.

The co main event was set to feature a kickboxing title fight, the reigning ONE Kickboxing Light Heavyweight Champion Roman Kryklia was set to defend his title against Murat Aygün. The two were originally scheduled to fight at ONE Championship: Big Bang last year. However, in turn, Aygün has to withdraw on January 12 due to COVID-19, the bout was cancelled for the second time.

Filipino fighter Jeremy Miado and Robin Catalan will not be taking part in the upcoming event due to COVID-19. The pinoys opponents will thus face each other instead. Catalan, will return to action after a year against Elipitua Siregar on the card.

Bonus awards:

The following fighters were awarded bonuses:

- $50,000 Performance of the Night: Ekaterina Vandaryeva, Senzo Ikeda, Saygid Izagakhmaev

=== Results ===
ONE: Heavy Hitters
Weight Class				Method	Round	Time	Notes
W.Strawweight 57 kg	(China) Xiong Jingnan (c)	def.	(Japan) Ayaka Miura	Decision (Unanimous)	5	5:00	For the ONE Women's Strawweight Championship
Catchweight 66.45 kg	(Thailand) Tawanchai P.K. Saenchaimuaythaigym	def.	(Thailand) Saemapetch Fairtex	KO (Punches)	1	2:55	Muay Thai
Lightweight 77 kg	(Russia) Saygid Izagakhmaev	def.	(United States) James Nakashima	Submission (D'arce Choke)	2	2:17	
W.Strawweight 57 kg	(Thailand) Supergirl Jaroonsak MuayThai	def.	(Belarus) Ekaterina Vandaryeva	Decision (Split)	3	3:00	Muay Thai
Strawweight 57 kg	(Japan) Senzo Ikeda	def.	(Indonesia) Elipitua Siregar	KO (Punch to the Body)	3	2:00	
Light Heavyweight 102 kg	(Greece) Giannis Stoforidis	def.	(Russia) Beybulat Isaev	KO (Left Hook)	1	0:31	Kickboxing
Lead Card
W.Strawweight 57 kg	(Singapore) Tiffany Teo	def.	(China) Meng Bo	Submission (Rear-Naked Choke)	2	3:45	
Bantamweight 66 kg	(Japan) Shuya Kamikubo	def.	(United States) Troy Worthen	Submission (Rear-Naked Choke)	3	4:36	

== ONE Championship: Only the Brave ==
ONE Championship: Only the Brave
- Promotion: ONE Championship
- Date: January 28, 2022
- Venue: Singapore Indoor Stadium
- City: Singapore

ONE Championship: Only the Brave (also known as ONE 151: Sitthichai vs. Kiria, Nattawut vs. Allazov) was a Combat sport event held by ONE Championship on January 28, 2022, at the Singapore Indoor Stadium in Kallang, Singapore.

=== Background ===
The main event was set to feature an interim Heavyweight title fight between the Russian Anatoly Malykhin and the Belarusian Kiril Grishenko. However, the bout was canceled and moved to ONE Championship: Bad Blood.

The event also featured the semi-finals for the ONE Kickboxing Featherweight Grand Prix.

Francesko Xhaja made his promotional debut against the veterant Rade Opacic.

A Lightweight bout between Zhang Lipeng and Ruslan Emilbek Uulu was scheduled for the event.

Bonus awards:

The following fighters were awarded bonuses:

- $50,000 Performance of the Night: Chingiz Allazov, Rade Opacic, Zhang Lipeng.

=== Results ===
ONE: Only the Brave
Weight Class				Method	Round	Time	Notes
Featherweight 70 kg	(Thailand) Sitthichai Sitsongpeenong	def.	(Georgia (country)) Davit Kiria	Decision (Unanimous)	3	3:00	Kickboxing Featherweight Grand Prix Semi-finals
Featherweight 70 kg	(Belarus) Chingiz Allazov	def.	(Thailand) Jo Nattawut	KO (Head Kick and Punches)	1	1:55	Kickboxing Featherweight Grand Prix Semi-finals
Lightweight 77 kg	(China) Zhang Lipeng	def.	(Kyrgyzstan) Ruslan Emilbek Uulu	KO (Punches)	1	0:32	
Heavyweight 120 kg	(Serbia) Rade Opačić	def.	(Albania) Françesko Xhaja	TKO (3 Knockdown Rule)	2	2:00	Kickboxing
Welterweight 84 kg	(Japan) Hiroyuki Tetsuka	def.	(Brazil) Edson Marques	KO (Punches)	3	1:05	
Strawweight 57 kg	(United States) Jarred Brooks	def.	(Japan) Hiroba Minowa	Decision (Unanimous)	3	5:00	
Lead Card
Catchweight 71.65 kg	(Russia) Ivan Kondratev	def.	(Lithuania) Dovydas Rimkus	KO (Punches)	3	0:35	Kickboxing
Catchweight 61.5 kg	(Japan) Tatsumitsu Wada	def.	(China) Wang Shuo	Decision (Unanimous)	3	5:00	
Bantamweight 66 kg	(Mongolia) Purev Otgonjargal	def.	(Brazil) Micael de Jesus	Decision (Unanimous)	3	5:00	

== ONE Championship: Bad Blood ==
ONE Championship: Bad Blood
- Promotion: ONE Championship
- Date: February 11, 2022
- Venue: Singapore Indoor Stadium
- City: Singapore

ONE Championship: Bad Blood (also known as ONE 152: Malykhin vs. Grisheko) was a Combat sport event held by ONE Championship on February 11, 2022, at the Singapore Indoor Stadium in Kallang, Singapore.

=== Background ===
Bibiano Fernandes was scheduled to make his second ONE bantamweight title defense against John Lineker in the main event. However, Lineker tested positive for COVID days before the event and the bout was pulled. The interim Heavyweight title fight between the Russian Anatoly Malykhin and the Belarusian Kiril Grishenko was promoted to the main event.

Former ONE Flyweight Muay Thai Champion Jonathan Haggerty will make his return to action when he faces #4-ranking Flyweight Muay Thai Mongkolpetch Petchyindee Academy.

A strawweight bout between Yosuke Saruta and Gustavo Balart was planned for the event. However, Saruta tested positive for COVID days before the event and the bout will be rescheduled to ONE 156.

A welterweight fight between Ken Hasegawa and Murad Ramazanov was scheduled for ONE: Bad Blood Hasegawa was injured and out of his clash with Murad Ramazanov, the bout is set to be rebooked.

The Filipina fighter Jenelyn Olsim was set to faces Jihin Radzuan of Malaysia in a women's atomweight bout. However, a two days before the event, Olsim withdrew from the bout, reportedly because she has suffered an injury during her training. She was replaced by Mei Yamaguchi.

Bonus awards:

The following fighters were awarded bonuses:

- $50,000 Performance of the Night: Jonathan Haggerty, Woo Sung Hoon

=== Results ===
ONE: Bad Blood
Weight Class				Method	Round	Time	Notes
Heavyweight 120 kg	(Russia) Anatoliy Malykhin	def.	(Belarus) Kirill Grishenko	KO (Punch)	2	3:42	For the Interim ONE Heavyweight Championship
Flyweight 61 kg	(England) Jonathan Haggerty	def.	(Thailand) Mongkolpetch Petchyindee	Decision (Unanimous)	3	3:00	Muay Thai
Bantamweight 66 kg	(China) Chen Rui	def.	(New Zealand) Mark Abelardo	Decision (Unanimous)	3	5:00	
W.Catchweight 53.5 kg	(Malaysia) Jihin Radzuan	def.	(Japan) Mei Yamaguchi	Decision (Unanimous)	3	5:00	
Flyweight 61 kg	(South Korea) Woo Sung Hoon	def.	(Thailand) Yodkaikaew Fairtex	KO (Punches)	1	0:18	
Strawweight 57 kg	(Australia) Danial Williams	def.	(Thailand) Dejdamrong Sor Amnuaysirichoke	KO (Punch to the Body)	2	1:35	
Lead Card
Heavyweight 120 kg	(Canada) Dustin Joynson	def.	(Brazil) Hugo Cunha	Decision (Split)	3	5:00	
W.Atomweight 52 kg	(China) Lin Heqin	def.	(Vietnam) Bi Nguyen	Decision (Unanimous)	3	5:00	
Heavyweight 120 kg	(United States) Odie Delaney	def.	(Norway) Thomas Narmo	Submission (Shoulder Lock)	1	1:06	
Bantamweight 66 kg	(Indonesia) Sunoto Peringkat	-	(Myanmar) Tial Thang	No Contest (Accidental Groin Knee)	1	1:37	

== ONE Championship: Full Circle ==
ONE Championship: Full Circle
- Promotion: ONE Championship
- Date: February 25, 2022
- Venue: Singapore Indoor Stadium
- City: Singapore

ONE Championship: Full Circle (also known as ONE 153: De Ridder vs. Abbasov) was a Combat sport event held by ONE Championship on February 25, 2022, at the Singapore Indoor Stadium in Kallang, Singapore.

=== Background ===
A ONE Middleweight World Championship bout between reigning champion Reinier de Ridder and title challenger Kiamrian Abbasov was scheduled as the main event. Two additional title fights were later added as well: a ONE Kickboxing Light Heavyweight Championship bout between the champion Roman Kryklia and challenger Murat Aygun, as well as a ONE Muay Thai Featherweight Championship between champion Petchmorakot Petchyindee and challenger Jamal Yusupov.

Jamal Yusupov and David Branch, but the two veterans have been forced to withdraw from their respective matchups.

Bonus awards:

The following fighters were awarded bonuses:

- $50,000 Performance of the Night: Reinier de Ridder, Roman Kryklia

=== Results ===
ONE: Full Circle
Weight Class				Method	Round	Time	Notes
Middleweight 93 kg	(Netherlands) Reinier de Ridder (c)	def.	(Kyrgyzstan) Kiamrian Abbasov	Submission (arm-triangle choke)	3	0:57	For the ONE Middleweight Championship
Light Heavyweight 102 kg	(Ukraine) Roman Kryklia (c)	def.	(Netherlands) Murat Aygun	KO (Kick to the Body and Punches)	1	2:32	For the ONE Kickboxing Light Heavyweight Championship
Catchweight 95 kg	(Russia) Vitaly Bigdash	def.	(Myanmar) Aung La Nsang	Decision (Unanimous)	3	5:00	
Featherweight 70 kg	(Turkey) Tayfun Özcan	def.	(Germany) Enriko Kehl	Decision (Unanimous)	3	3:00	Kickboxing
Heavyweight 120 kg	(Brazil) Guto Inocente	def.	(Portugal) Bruno Susano	TKO (Referee Stoppage)	2	2:22	Kickboxing
Bantamweight 66 kg	(Brazil) Fabricio Andrade	def.	(Philippines) Jeremy Pacatiw	KO (Knee to the Body)	1	1:37	
Lead Card
Catchweight 87.3 kg	(Sweden) Zebaztian Kadestam	def.	(Brazil) Valmir da Silva	KO (Punches)	1	1:26	
Bantamweight 66 kg	(Russia) Vladimir Kuzmin	def.	(Scotland) Chris Shaw	Decision (Unanimous)	3	3:00	Muay Thai
W.Catchweight 58 kg	(Sweden) Smilla Sundell	def.	(Australia) Diandra Martin	TKO (3 Knockdown Rule)	3	1:35	Muay Thai
Welterweight 84 kg	(Russia) Daniyal Zainalov	def.	(Brazil) Yuri Simões	Decision (Split)	3	5:00	
Flyweight 61 kg	(Spain) Daniel Puertas	def.	(China) Jiduo Yibu	Decision (Split)	3	3:00	Kickboxing
Lightweight 77 kg	(Philippines) Drex Zamboanga	def.	(India) Rahul Raju	KO (Uppercut)	1	1:05	

== ONE Championship: Lights Out ==
ONE Championship: Lights Out
- Promotion: ONE Championship
- Date: March 11, 2022
- Venue: Singapore Indoor Stadium
- City: Singapore

ONE Championship: Lights Out (also known as ONE 154: Le vs. Tonon) was a Combat sport event held by ONE Championship on March 11, 2022, at the Singapore Indoor Stadium in Kallang, Singapore.

=== Background ===
A ONE Featherweight Championship title bout between champion Thanh Le and title challenger Garry Tonon was scheduled as the main event.

ONE Bantamweight World Champion Bibiano Fernandes defends his belt against top-ranked contender John Lineker, and newly crowned ONE Strawweight Muay Thai World Champion Prajanchai PK.Saenchai makes his first title defense against #3-ranked Joseph Lasiri.

Bonus awards:

The following fighters were awarded bonuses:

- $50,000 Performance of the Night: Thanh Le, John Lineker, Zhang Peimian, Iman Barlow, Liam Nolan

=== Results ===
ONE: Lights Out
Weight Class				Method	Round	Time	Notes
Featherweight 70 kg	(United States) Thanh Le (c)	def.	(United States) Garry Tonon	KO (Punches)	1	0:56	For the ONE Featherweight Championship
Bantamweight 66 kg	(Brazil) John Lineker	def.	(Brazil) Bibiano Fernandes (c)	KO (Punch)	2	3:40	For the ONE Bantamweight Championship
Featherweight 70 kg	(Australia) Martin Nguyen	def.	(Ukraine) Kirill Gorobets	TKO (Punches)	3	2:18	
Catchweight 123.8 kg	(Iran) Iraj Azizpour	def.	(Suriname) Ismael Londt	KO (Punch)	2	2:01	Kickboxing
Strawweight 57 kg	(Indonesia) Adrian Mattheis	def.	(Brazil) Alex Silva	TKO (Punches)	2	0:05	
Strawweight 57 kg	(China) Zhang Peimian	def.	(Australia) Josh Tonna	TKO (3 Knockdown Rules)	2	2:11	Kickboxing
Lead Card
Flyweight 61 kg	(Indonesia) Eko Roni Saputra	def.	(Cambodia) Chan Rothana	Submission (Rear-Naked Choke)	1	1:34	
W.Strawweight 57 kg	(England) Iman Barlow	def.	(Argentina) Daniela Lopez	TKO (Doctor Stoppage)	1	1:39	Muay Thai
Catchweight 79.55 kg	(England) Liam Nolan	def.	(South Korea) Kim Kyung Lock	TKO (Knees)	1	1:02	Muay Thai
W.Strawweight 57 kg	(China) Lin Heqin	def.	(Argentina) Milagros Lopez	Decision (Unanimous)	3	3:00	Kickboxing

== Road to ONE: Utrecht ==
Road to ONE: Utrecht
- Promotion: ONE Championship
- Date: March 12, 2022
- Venue: WFL Studio
- City: Utrecht, Netherlands

Road to ONE: Utrecht was a Kickboxing event held by ONE Championship, the last of 8 4-men tournaments making up the last 32 and last 16 of the Road to One kickboxing tournament in collaboration with 1MMA, sanctioned by Vechtsport Organisatie Nederland (VON) and supported by Global Association of Mixed Martial Arts (GAMMA), on March 12, 2022, at the WFL Studio in Utrecht, Netherlands.

=== Background ===
The event will feature a 4-man heavyweight qualification tournament to earn a sport in the Road to one Europe tournament.

=== Results ===
Road to ONE
Weight Class				Method	Round	Time	Notes
Heavyweight 120 kg	(Nigeria) Kevin Tariq Osaro	def.	(Netherlands) Badr Ferdaous	Decision (Unanimous)	3	3:00	Heavyweight Tournament Final
Catchweight 85 kg	(Netherlands) Thomas Doeve	def.	(Greece) Vangelis Tzotzis	TKO (Punches)	2	1:18	Kickboxing
Catchweight 67 kg	(Belgium) Taoufic Hamzi	def.	(Germany) Patrick Becoy	Decision (Unanimous)	3	3:00	Kickboxing
Heavyweight 120 kg	(Netherlands) Badr Ferdaous	def.	(Bulgaria) Lazar Todev	Decision (Unanimous)	3	3:00	Heavyweight Tournament Semi-finals
Heavyweight 120 kg	(Nigeria) Kevin Tariq Osaro	def.	(Morocco) Tarik Cherkaoui	TKO (Arm Injury)	1	2:20	Heavyweight Tournament Semi-finals

== ONE Championship: X ==
ONE Championship: X
- Promotion: ONE Championship
- Date: March 26, 2022
- Venue: Singapore Indoor Stadium
- City: Singapore

ONE Championship: X (also known as ONE 155: Lee vs. Stamp, ONE 155: X and ONE 155: X, 10 YEARS) was a Combat sport event held by ONE Championship on March 26, 2022, at the Singapore Indoor Stadium in Kallang, Singapore.

=== Background ===
On 27 October 2021, CEO Chatri Sityodtong broke the news that ONE: X would be postponed to early 2022, owing to a recent surge in the COVID-19 pandemic in Singapore. The event was later rescheduled for March 26, 2022.

It was announced that ONE Flyweight World Grand Prix Champion Demetrious Johnson had signed on to compete at ONE X against ONE Muay Thai Flyweight Champion Rodtang Jitmuangnon in a special rules fight. The contest was set for four, three-minute rounds alternating between Muay Thai and MMA rules. The fight started under Muay Thai rules and switched to MMA for the following rounds.

Stamp Fairtex challenged ONE Atomweight Champion Angela Lee in the headlining bout for the 10th anniversary card with return to full attendance in Singapore.

Adriano Moraes defended the ONE Flyweight Championship against #2-ranked Yuya Wakamatsu.

ONE Bantamweight Muay Thai World Champion Nong-O Gaiyanghadao was scheduled to defend his title against former ONE Bantamweight Kickboxing World Champion Alaverdi Ramazanov. Because of the 2022 Russian invasion of Ukraine, Ramazanov was replaced with the Brazilian Felipe Lobo.

John Wayne Parr faced former ONE Lightweight World Champion Eduard Folayang in retirement Wushu vs. Muay Thai legends fight.

Shinya Aoki and Yoshihiro Akiyama faced one another at ONE X in a clash of Japanese MMA legends.

Capitan Petchyindee defended the ONE Bantamweight Kickboxing Championship against #2-ranked bantamweight kickboxer Hiroki Akimoto.

Four years since they first fought, Superbon Banchamek defended his ONE Featherweight Kickboxing Championship title against #1-ranked Marat Grigorian.

Eight years since they first fought, the #3-ranked Sitthichai Sitsongpeenong rematched the #4-ranked Chingiz Allazov for the Featherweight Kickboxing Grand Prix Final.

Top Filipino strawweights Lito Adiwang and Jeremy Miado faced each other at this event. A rematch between Seo Hee Ham and Denice Zamboanga was also booked for the event. A featherweight fight between Amir Khan and Ryogo Takahashi was added to the ONE: X card.

Reinier de Ridder and Andre Galvao met in a submission grappling match. The American Danielle Kelly made her debut at ONE X in an atomweight submission grappling match against Japanese veteran Mei Yamaguchi.

Nieky Holzken was scheduled to face Islam Murtazaev in a fight between two top lightweight Kickboxing contenders. Shoko Sato was to meet Yusup Saadulaev in a battle of formerly ranked bantamweight contenders. The card also featured Ryuto Sawada and Senzo Ikeda, who meet in a strawweight contest. However, due to the 2022 Russian invasion of Ukraine, all Russian athletes were removed from the card as a result of the Singaporean government banning them from entering the country. As a result, Murtazaev was replaced by Sinsamut Klinmee and Yusup Saadulaev was replaced by Stephen Loman.

Alyse Anderson was scheduled to fight with Indian striker Asha Roka. However, the bout did not materialize.

An atomweight fight between Itsuki Hirata and Jihin Radzuan was added to the card.

Bonus awards:

The following fighters were awarded bonuses:

- $50,000 Performance of the Night: Angela Lee, Yoshihiro Akiyama, John Wayne Parr, Hiroki Akimoto, Tang Kai, Sinsamut Klinmee, Kang Ji Won, Danielle Kelly

=== Results ===
==== Grand Finale ====
ONE: X Grand Finale
Weight Class				Method	Round	Time	Notes
W.Atomweight 52 kg	(United States) Angela Lee (c)	def.	(Thailand) Stamp Fairtex	Submission (Rear-Naked Choke)	2	4:50	For the ONE Women's Atomweight Championship
Flyweight 61 kg	(United States) Demetrious Johnson	def.	(Thailand) Rodtang Jitmuangnon	Technical Submission (Rear-Naked Choke)	2	2:13	Special Rules Bout
Flyweight 61 kg	(Brazil) Adriano Moraes (c)	def.	(Japan) Yuya Wakamatsu	Submission (Guillotine Choke)	3	3:58	For the ONE Flyweight Championship
Lightweight 77 kg	(Japan) Yoshihiro Akiyama	def.	(Japan) Shinya Aoki	TKO (Punches)	2	1:50	Japanese MMA Legends Fight
Lightweight 77 kg	(Philippines) Eduard Folayang	def.	(Australia) John Wayne Parr	Decision (Unanimous)	3	3:00	Wushu vs. Muay Thai Legends Fight. Muay Thai rules
Featherweight 70 kg	(Thailand) Superbon Singha Mawynn (c)	def.	(Armenia) Marat Grigorian	Decision (Unanimous)	5	3:00	For the ONE Kickboxing Featherweight Championship

==== Part II ====
ONE: X Part II
Weight Class				Method	Round	Time	Notes
Bantamweight 66 kg	(Thailand) Nong-O Gaiyanghadao (c)	def.	(Brazil) Felipe Lobo	KO (Uppercut)	3	2:15	For the ONE Muay Thai Bantamweight Championship
Bantamweight 66 kg	(Japan) Hiroki Akimoto	def.	(Thailand) Capitan Petchyindee (c)	Decision (Unanimous)	5	3:00	For the ONE Kickboxing Bantamweight Championship
W.Atomweight 52 kg	(South Korea) Seo Hee Ham	def.	(Philippines) Denice Zamboanga	Decision (Unanimous)	3	5:00	
W.Atomweight 52 kg	(Malaysia) Jihin Radzuan	def.	(Japan) Itsuki Hirata	Decision (Split)	3	5:00	
Featherweight 70 kg	(China) Tang Kai	def.	(South Korea) Kim Jae Woong	KO (Punches)	1	2:07	

==== Part I ====
ONE: X Part I
Weight Class				Method	Round	Time	Notes
Featherweight 70 kg	(Belarus) Chingiz Allazov	def.	(Thailand) Sitthichai Sitsongpeenong	Decision (Unanimous)	3	3:00	ONE Kickboxing Featherweight Grand Prix Final
Middleweight 93 kg	(Netherlands) Reinier de Ridder	-	(Brazil) André Galvão	Draw (Time Expire)	1	12:00	Submission Grappling
Lightweight 77 kg	(Thailand) Sinsamut Klinmee	def.	(Netherlands) Nieky Holzken	KO (Punch)	2	1:39	Muay Thai
Strawweight 57 kg	(Philippines) Jeremy Miado	def.	(Philippines) Lito Adiwang	TKO (Knee Injury)	2	2:56	
Bantamweight 66 kg	(Philippines) Stephen Loman	def.	(Japan) Shoko Sato	Decision (Unanimous)	3	5:00	
Featherweight 70 kg	(Singapore) Amir Khan	def.	(Japan) Ryogo Takahashi	Decision (Split)	3	5:00	
Heavyweight 120 kg	(South Korea) Kang Ji Won	def.	(England) Paul Elliot	KO (Punch)	1	0:58	
W.Atomweight 52 kg	(Japan) Mei Yamaguchi	-	(United States) Danielle Kelly	Draw (Time Expire)	1	12:00	Submission Grappling
Strawweight 57 kg	(Japan) Senzo Ikeda	def.	(Japan) Ryuto Sawada	TKO (Knees)	2	3:09	

== Road to ONE: RUF 46 ==
Road to ONE: RUF 46
- Promotion: ONE Championship; RUF Nation
- Date: March 26, 2022
- Venue: Celebrity Theatre
- City: (United States) Phoenix, Arizona, USA

Road to ONE: RUF 46 was a Combat sport event held by ONE Championship in partnership with RUF Nation on March 26, 2022, at the Celebrity Theatre in Phoenix, Arizona, United States.

=== Background ===
The event featured the semi-finals for the Road to ONE RUF MMA Heavyweight tournament, with the champion receiving a US$100,000+ contract to compete in ONE Championship.

=== Results ===
Road to ONE: RUF 46
Weight Class				Method	Round	Time	Notes
Heavyweight 120 kg	(United States) Terrance Jean-Jacques	def.	(United States) Irvins Ayala	TKO (Punches)	2	3:48	RUF MMA Road to ONE Semi-finals
Heavyweight 120 kg	(United States) Yimaz Wildman	def.	(United States) Cameron Chism	Submission (Rear-Naked Choke)	1	4:21	RUF MMA Road to ONE Semi-finals
Featherweight 66 kg	(Mexico) José Miguel Delgado	def.	(United States) JJ Nelson	Submission (Rear-Naked Choke)	1	0:40	
Heavyweight 120 kg	(United States) Bradley Burston	def.	(United States) Patrick Baughman	Decision (Unanimous)	3	3:00	Amateur
Middleweight 84 kg	(United States) Tristan Mordecai	def.	(United States) Brooks Callaghan	KO (Punches)	1	0:30	For the RUF Amateur Middleweight Championship
W.Catchweight 63.5 kg	(United States) Zurina Turrey	def.	(United States) Angelica Flores	Decision (Unanimous)	3	3:00	Amateur
Bantamweight 61 kg	(United States) Roderick Aygeman	def.	(United States) Eduardo Garcia	KO (Punches)	2	1:27	Amateur
Flyweight 57 kg	(United States) Antonio Ruiz	def.	(United States) Calvin Dunning	Submission (Armbar)	1	2:22	Amateur
Bantamweight 61 kg	(United States) Deshawn White	def.	(United States) Artis Lyles	TKO (Punches)	1	1:23	Amateur
Bantamweight 61 kg	(United States) NoahDeLa Calzada	def.	(United States) Patrick Quick Jr	Submission (Rear-Naked Choke)	3	2:19	Amateur
Heavyweight 120 kg	(United States) Micheal Quarcoo	def.	(United States) Casey Edwards	Decision (Unanimous)	3	3:00	Amateur
Middleweight 84 kg	(United States) Evan Hunt	def.	(United States) Alex Barreras	TKO (Punches)	1	2:08	Amateur
Featherweight 66 kg	(United States) Antron Petty	def.	(United States) Tim Carrillo	TKO (Punches)	1	1:23	Amateur

== ONE 156: Eersel vs. Sadikovic ==
ONE 156: Eersel vs. Sadikovic
- Promotion: ONE Championship
- Date: April 22, 2022
- Venue: Singapore Indoor Stadium
- City: Singapore

ONE Championship 156: Eersel vs. Sadikovic was a Combat sport event held by ONE Championship on April 22, 2022, at the Singapore Indoor Stadium in Kallang, Singapore.

=== Background ===
The event was headlined by a ONE Kickboxing Lightweight Championship bout between the reigning champion Regian Eersel and title challenger Arian Sadiković.

The Co-main Event Jackie Buntan and Smilla Sundell challenged for the inaugural ONE Women's Strawweight Muay Thai Championship.

A strawweight MMA clash between #1-ranked Bokang Masunyane and #2-ranked Jarred Brooks has been added to the event.

Former WBC and WMC Muay Thai World Champion Liam Harrison faced "Elbow Zombie" Muangthai PK.Saenchai in a bantamweight Muay Thai showdown. and Opening the lead card was a strawweight mixed martial arts bout between Namiki Kawahara and Danial Williams.

Marcus Almeida returns to action against Oumar Kane.

A Strawweight bout between former ONE Strawweight Champion Yosuke Saruta and Gustavo Balart was expected to take place at ONE: Bad Blood in February, but Saruta withdraw from the bout due to tested positive for COVID-19. The pairing was rebooked for this event.

A kickboxing light heavyweight bout between former SUPERKOMBAT Super Cruiserweight Champion Andrei Stoica and Giannis Stoforidis was scheduled for the event.

A Women's Atomweight Muay Thai bout between Former Glory Women's Super Bantamweight Championship Anissa Meksen and Estonian phenom Marie Ruumet was scheduled for the event.

A Women's Strawweight bout between former Women's Strawweight title Challenger Ayaka Miura and Dayane Cardoso was scheduled for the event.

Mikey Musumeci is to compete against Japanese MMA veteran Masakazu Imanari this bout was a Submission Grappling match.

Bonus awards:

The following fighters were awarded bonuses:

- $50,000 Performance of the Night: Mikey Musumeci, Liam Harrison x2, Smilla Sundell, Regian Eersel

=== Results ===
ONE 156: Eersel vs. Sadikovic
Weight Class				Method	Round	Time	Notes
Lightweight 77 kg	(Suriname) Regian Eersel (c)	def.	(Germany) Arian Sadiković	Decision (Unanimous)	5	3:00	For the ONE Kickboxing Lightweight Championship
W.Strawweight 57 kg	(Sweden) Smilla Sundell	def.	(United States) Jackie Buntan	Decision (Unanimous)	5	3:00	For the Inaugural ONE Muay Thai Women's Strawweight Championship
Catchweight 58.1 kg	(United States) Jarred Brooks	def.	(South Africa) Bokang Masunyane	Technical Submission (Rear-Naked Choke)	1	4:39	ONE Strawweight Title Eliminator
Bantamweight 66 kg	(England) Liam Harrison	def.	(Thailand) Muangthai P.K.Saenchai	TKO (3 Knockdowns)	1	2:19	Muay Thai
Bantamweight 66 kg	(South Korea) Song Min Jong	def.	(China) Chen Rui	Technical Submission (Rear-Naked Choke)	2	4:26	
Strawweight 57 kg	(Australia) Danial Williams	def.	(Japan) Namiki Kawahara	Decision (Unanimous)	3	5:00	
Lead Card
Strawweight 57 kg	(Cuba) Gustavo Balart	def.	(Japan) Yosuke Saruta	Decision (Unanimous)	3	5:00	
Light Heavyweight 102 kg	(Romania) Andrei Stoica	def.	(Greece) Giannis Stoforidis	Decision (Majority)	3	3:00	Kickboxing
W.Atomweight 52 kg	(France) Anissa Meksen	def.	(Estonia) Marie Ruumet	Decision (Unanimous)	3	3:00	Muay Thai
Flyweight 61 kg	(Brazil) Windson Ramos	def.	(South Korea) Woo Sung Hoon	Decision (Unanimous)	3	5:00	
W.Strawweight 57 kg	(Brazil) Dayane Souza	def.	(Japan) Ayaka Miura	TKO (Shoulder Injury)	2	0:56	
Lightweight 77 kg	(Brazil) Abraao Amorim	def.	(South Korea) Dae Sung Park	TKO (Knee and Punches)	2	1:20	
Welterweight 84 kg	(South Korea) Jin Tae Ho	def.	(Malaysia) Agilan Thani	Submission (Kimura)	1	2:23	
Catchweight 65 kg	(United States) Mikey Musumeci	def.	(Japan) Masakazu Imanari	Submission (Rear-Naked Choke)	1	4:09	Submission Grappling
Featherweight 70 kg	(Malaysia) Keanu Subba	def.	(United States) James Yang	Decision (Unanimous)	3	5:00	

== Road to ONE: RUF 47 ==
Road to ONE: RUF 47
- Promotion: ONE Championship; RUF Nation
- Date: May 14, 2022
- Venue: Celebrity Theatre
- City: (United States) Phoenix, Arizona, USA

Road to ONE: RUF 47 was a Combat sport event held by ONE Championship in partnership with RUF Nation on May 14, 2022, at the Celebrity Theatre in Phoenix, Arizona, USA.

=== Background ===
The event featured the final for the Road to ONE RUF MMA Heavyweight tournament, with the champion receiving a US$100,000+ contract to compete in ONE Championship.

=== Results ===
Road to ONE: RUF 47
Weight Class				Method	Round	Time	Notes
Heavyweight 120 kg	(United States) Terrance Jean-Jacques	def.	(United States) Yimaz Wildman	Decision (Unanimous)	3	5:00	RUF MMA Road to ONE Final
Bantamweight 61 kg	(United States) Marcus McGhee	def.	(United States) Rodney Mondala	KO/TKO	1	0:58	
Bantamweight 61 kg	(United States) Mark Coates	def.	(Brazil) Raphael Montini	Submission (Rear-Naked Choke)	1	3:37	
Bantamweight 61 kg	(United States) Adam Ortiz	def.	(United States) Talon Glasser	Submission (Rear-Naked Choke)	2	1:15	
Flyweight 57 kg	(United States) Jordan Burkholder	def.	(United States) Humberto Duarte	Decision (Unanimous)	3	5:00	
Bantamweight 61 kg	(United States) Abdul Kamara	def.	(United States) Ryan Mondala	Submission (Rear-Naked Choke)	1	2:11	
Heavyweight 120 kg	(United States) O’Shay Jordan	def.	(United States) Talal Yousufzai	Submission (Rear-Naked Choke)	2	1:14	Amateur
Lightweight 70 kg	(United States) Enrique Barcenas	def.	(United States) Caleb Encinas	TKO (Punches)	1	1:39	Amateur
Light Heavyweight 93 kg	(United States) Patrick Baughman	def.	(United States) Matthew Stanger	TKO (Punches)	1	0:45	Amateur
Featherweight 66 kg	(United States) Devin Ray	def.	(United States) Steve Hernandez	Submission (Rear-Naked Choke)	1	0:28	Amateur
Catchweight 59 kg	(United States) Anthony Rees	def.	(United States) Brandon Elizondo	Decision (Unanimous)	1	3:00	Amateur

== ONE 157: Petchmorakot vs. Vienot ==
ONE 157: Petchmorakot vs. Vienot
- Promotion: ONE Championship
- Date: May 20, 2022
- Venue: Singapore Indoor Stadium
- City: Singapore

ONE Championship 157: Petchmorakot vs. Vienot was a Combat sport event held by ONE Championship on May 20, 2022, at the Singapore Indoor Stadium in Kallang, Singapore.

=== Background ===
A ONE Muay Thai Featherweight Championship bout between the champion Petchmorakot Petchyindee Academy and current SUPERKOMBAT World Middleweight Champion Jimmy Vienot (also former Lumpinee Stadium middleweight champion) was booked as the main event.

A ONE Muay Thai Strawweight Championship bout between the champion Prajanchai P.K.Saenchai and title challenger Joseph Lasiri was expected to take place at ONE: Lights Out but it was postponed due to Lasiri getting injury during his training camp. They met at this event instead scheduled as the co-main event.

The quarter-finals bouts of the ONE Muay Thai Flyweight Grand Prix were held during the event.

A ONE Flyweight Muay Thai Grand Prix bout between current ONE Flyweight Muay Thai Champion Rodtang Jitmuangnon and Jacob Smith was expected to take place at ONE on TNT 1 in last April, but Smith withdraw from the bout due to injury. The pairing was rebooked for this event.

Jonathan Haggerty was set to face Walter Goncalves in the quarter-finals of the ONE Muay Thai Flyweight Grand Prix. However, Haggerty was forced to pull out of his bout with Goncalves at the last minute due to health issue. Haggerty was replaced in his tournament quarter-finals against Goncalves by Josue Cruz, who had been set to compete in a Grand Prix alternate bout against Panpayak Jitmuangnon earlier in the card.

A heavyweight bout between Marcus Almeida and Hugo Cunha was expected for the main card. However, Cunha tested positive for COVID-19 before the event and was replaced by Jasur Mirzamukhamedov. However, Mirzamukhamedov tested positive for COVID-19 After traveling to Singapore. the bout will be rescheduled for Buchecha and expected to return to action at ONE 158.

Two lightweight submission grappling matches were announced for the event: between Garry Tonon and Tye Ruotolo, as well as between Shinya Aoki and Kade Ruotolo.

A Women's Atomweight bout between Alyse Anderson and Asha Roka was scheduled for ONE: X. However, Anderson withdraw from the bout for medical reasons. The pairing was rebooked for this event.

Bonus awards:

The following fighters were awarded bonuses:

- $50,000 Performance of the Night: Tye Ruotolo, Rodtang Jitmuangnon, Joseph Lasiri, Petchmorakot Petchyindee

=== Results ===
ONE 157: Petchmorakot vs. Vienot
Weight Class				Method	Round	Time	Notes
Featherweight 70 kg	(Thailand) Petchmorakot Petchyindee (c)	def.	(France) Jimmy Vienot	Decision (Split)	5	3:00	For the ONE Muay Thai Featherweight Championship
Strawweight 57 kg	(Italy) Joseph Lasiri	def.	(Thailand) Prajanchai P.K.Saenchai (c)	TKO (Retirement)	3	3:00	For the ONE Muay Thai Strawweight Championship
Flyweight 61 kg	(Thailand) Rodtang Jitmuangnon	def.	(England) Jacob Smith	Decision (Unanimous)	3	3:00	ONE Muay Thai Flyweight Grand Prix Quarter-final
Lightweight 77 kg	(United States) Tye Ruotolo	def.	(United States) Garry Tonon	Submission (D'arce Choke)	1	1:37	Submission Grappling
Lightweight 77 kg	(United States) Kade Ruotolo	def.	(Japan) Shinya Aoki	Decision (Unanimous)	1	10:00	Submission Grappling
Flyweight 61 kg	(Brazil) Walter Goncalves	def.	(Mexico) Josue Cruz	KO (Punches and Knees)	1	0:35	ONE Muay Thai Flyweight Grand Prix Quarter-final
Lead Card
Flyweight 61 kg	(Thailand) Superlek Kiatmoo9	def.	(Japan) Taiki Naito	Decision (Unanimous)	3	3:00	ONE Muay Thai Flyweight Grand Prix Quarter-final
Flyweight 61 kg	(Cyprus) Savvas Michael	def.	(Iran) Amir Naseri	Decision (Unanimous)	3	3:00	ONE Muay Thai Flyweight Grand Prix Quarter-final
W.Atomweight 52 kg	(United States) Alyse Anderson	def.	(India) Asha Roka	Submission (Triangle Choke)	1	2:04	
Featherweight 70 kg	(Morocco) Mohammed Boutasaa	def.	(Georgia (country)) Davit Kiria	Decision (Unanimous)	3	3:00	Kickboxing
W.Strawweight 57 kg	(Thailand) Nat Jaroonsak	def.	(India) Zeba Bano	Submission (Armbar)	1	1:22	
Flyweight 61 kg	(Kyrgyzstan) Sherzod Kabutov	def.	(Canada) Denis Purić	Decision (Unanimous)	3	3:00	ONE Muay Thai Flyweight Grand Prix Alternate Bout
Strawweight 57 kg	(Indonesia) Elipitua Siregar	def.	(Philippines) Robin Catalan	Submission (Anaconda Choke)	1	2:58	

== ONE 158: Tawanchai vs. Larsen ==
ONE 158: Tawanchai vs. Larsen
- Promotion: ONE Championship
- Date: June 3, 2022
- Venue: Singapore Indoor Stadium
- City: Singapore

ONE Championship 158: Tawanchai vs. Larsen was a Combat sport event held by ONE Championship on June 3, 2022, at the Singapore Indoor Stadium in Kallang, Singapore.

=== Background ===
A ONE Strawweight Championship title bout between champion Joshua Pacio and title challenger Jarred Brooks was scheduled as the main event. The bout was later postponed, as Brooks withdrew with an injury. A featherweight muay thai bout between Tawanchai P.K. Saenchaimuaythaigym and Niclas Larsen was promoted from co-main to main event in its stead.

An atomweight bout between Jenelyn Olsim and Julie Mezabarba was announced for the event.

Bonus awards:

The following fighters were awarded bonuses:

- $50,000 Performance of the Night: Alex Silva, Fabricio Andrade, Tawanchai P.K.Saenchai

=== Results ===
ONE 158: Tawanchai vs. Larsen
Weight Class				Method	Round	Time	Notes
Featherweight 70 kg	(Thailand) Tawanchai P.K.Saenchai	def.	(Denmark) Niclas Larsen	KO (Punches)	2	1:42	Muay Thai
Bantamweight 66 kg	(Brazil) Fabricio Andrade	def.	(South Korea) Kwon Won Il	KO (Body Kick)	1	1:02	
Flyweight 61 kg	(Australia) Reece McLaren	def.	(China) Xie Wei	Submission (Rear-Naked Choke)	1	3:42	
Flyweight 61 kg	(Kazakhstan) Kairat Akhmetov	def.	(Japan) Tatsumitsu Wada	Decision (Unanimous)	3	5:00	
Heavyweight 120 kg	(Brazil) Guto Inocente	def.	(Serbia) Rade Opačić	KO (Punch to the Body)	1	2:33	Kickboxing
Strawweight 57 kg	(Brazil) Alex Silva	def.	(Indonesia) Adrian Mattheis	Submission (Inside Heel Hook)	1	3:34	
Lead Card
Flyweight 61 kg	(Canada) Gurdarshan Mangat	def.	(Thailand) Yodkaikaew Fairtex	Decision (Split)	3	5:00	
Lightweight 77 kg	(Moldova) Constantin Rusu	def.	(Morocco) Marouan Toutouh	Decision (Unanimous)	3	3:00	Kickboxing
Heavyweight 120 kg	(Brazil) Marcus Almeida	def.	(Australia) Simon Carson	TKO (Punches)	1	2:24	
Heavyweight 120 kg	(United States) Odie Delaney	def.	(Iran) Mehdi Barghi	Submission (Straight Arm Lock)	2	2:22	
Heavyweight 120 kg	(Uzbekistan) Jasur Mirzamukhamedov	def.	(Australia) Duke Didier	Decision (Split)	3	5:00	
W.Atomweight 52 kg	(Philippines) Jenelyn Olsim	def.	(Brazil) Julie Mezabarba	Decision (Split)	3	5:00	
Lightweight 77 kg	(Brazil) Edson Marques	def.	(South Korea) Kim Kyung Lock	Decision (Unanimous)	3	5:00	

== ONE 159: De Ridder vs. Bigdash ==
ONE 159: De Ridder vs. Bigdash
- Promotion: ONE Championship
- Date: July 22, 2022
- Venue: Singapore Indoor Stadium
- City: Singapore

ONE Championship 159: De Ridder vs. Bigdash was a Combat sport event held by ONE Championship on July 22, 2022, at the Singapore Indoor Stadium in Kallang, Singapore.

=== Background ===
A ONE Middleweight Championship bout between current champion Reinier de Ridder and former champion Vitaly Bigdash headlined the event.

An interim ONE Muay Thai Women's Atomweight Championship bout between the ONE Kickboxing Atomweight World champion Janet Todd and Lara Fernandez was booked as the co-main event.

Fight card update:

A Lightweight Muay Thai bout between Sinsamut Klinmee and Islam Murtazaev was expected to take place at the event. However, Murtazaev withdraw due to a family emergency and was replaced by Liam Nolan.

A Women's Atomweight Submission grappling rematch between 2018 Asian Games gold medalist in Jujitsu and 2019 Southeast Asian Games gold medalist in Jujitsu Jessa Khan and Amanda Alequin was scheduled to take place at the event. However, Alequin withdraw due to undisclosed medical issue.

A Heavyweight bout between Anderson Silva and Mikhail Jamal Abdul-Latif was scheduled to take place at the event. However, Abdul-Latif withdrawal due to suffered an injury.

A respective bouts of a South African and formerly undefeated MMA superstar Bokang Masunyane and a Japanese MMA phenom Hiroba Minowa, Filipino-American Lea Bivins for a promotional newcomer and an Indian star Zeba Bano were scratched their line-up due to Masunyane and Bano have been missed weight, and also Minowa rejected to negotiate for a catchweight bout against Masunyane

Bonus awards:

The following fighters were awarded bonuses:

- $50,000 Performance of the Night: Sinsamut Klinmee, Danial Williams, Reinier de Ridder

=== Results ===
ONE 159
Weight Class				Method	Round	Time	Notes
Middleweight 93 kg	(Netherlands) Reinier de Ridder (c)	def.	(Russia) Vitaly Bigdash	Technical Submission (Inverted Triangle Choke)	1	3:29	For the ONE Middleweight Championship
W.Atomweight 52 kg	(United States) Janet Todd	def.	(Spain) Lara Fernandez	Decision (Unanimous)	5	3:00	For the interim ONE Muay Thai Women's Atomweight Championship
Bantamweight 66 kg	(Thailand) Muangthai P.K.Saenchai	def.	(Russia) Vladimir Kuzmin	Decision (Split)	3	3:00	Muay Thai
Strawweight 57 kg	(China) Zhang Peimian	def.	(Russia) Aslanbek Zikreev	Decision (Unanimous)	3	3:00	Kickboxing
Featherweight 70 kg	(Russia) Jamal Yusupov	def.	(Thailand) Jo Nattawut	Decision (Unanimous)	3	3:00	Muay Thai
Strawweight 57 kg	(Australia) Danial Williams	def.	(China) Zelang Zhaxi	KO (Punch)	1	4:20	
Lead Card
Lightweight 77 kg	(Thailand) Sinsamut Klinmee	def.	(England) Liam Nolan	KO (Punch)	2	0:05	Muay Thai
Lightweight 77 kg	(Russia) Marat Gafurov	def.	(Canada) Ariel Sexton	TKO (Punches)	3	4:15	
Welterweight 84 kg	(Brazil) Valmir da Silva	def.	(South Korea) Jin Tae Ho	Submission (Guillotine Choke)	2	4:55	

== Road to ONE: Thailand 1 ==
Road to ONE: Thailand 1
- Promotion: ONE Championship; Fairtex Fight Promotion
- Date: August 6, 2022
- Venue: Lumpinee Boxing Stadium
- City: Bangkok, Thailand

Road to ONE: Thailand 1 was a Combat sport event held by ONE Championship in partnership with Fairtex Fight Promotion on August 6, 2022, at the Lumpinee Boxing Stadium in Bangkok, Thailand.

=== Background ===
The event featured first part of the featherweight, flyweight and women's atomweight Road to ONE Muay Thai tournaments, with the champion receiving a US$100,000 contract to compete in ONE Championship.

=== Results ===
Road to ONE: Thailand 1
Weight Class				Method	Round	Time	Notes
Flyweight 61 kg	(Thailand) Starboy Petchkiatphet	def.	(Thailand) Phetsimok P.K.Saenchai Muaythaigym	Decision (Unanimous)	3	3:00	Road to ONE Muay Thai Flyweight Quarter-finals
Featherweight 70 kg	(Thailand) YotIQ P.K.Saenchai Muaythaigym	def.	(Thailand) Kwangtung Realfighter	Decision (Unanimous)	3	3:00	Road to ONE Muay Thai Featherweight Quarter-finals
Flyweight 61 kg	(Thailand) Dedduanglek Jeabramintra	def.	(Thailand) Tapaothong Sing Mawin	Decision (Unanimous)	3	3:00	Road to ONE Muay Thai Flyweight Quarter-finals
W.Atomweight 52 kg	(Thailand) Duangdawnoi Looksaikongdin	def.	(United States) Thai Ngan Le	Decision (Unanimous)	3	3:00	Road to ONE Muay Thai W.Atomweight Quarter-finals
Featherweight 70 kg	(Thailand) Yodphupha Tor. Yotha	def.	(Thailand) Talaytong Sor.Thanaphet	TKO (Punch)	1	2:46	Road to ONE Muay Thai Featherweight Quarter-finals
W.Atomweight 52 kg	(Thailand) Kamlaipetch Petchyindee Academy	def.	(Thailand) Pancake Kiatthongyot	Decision (Unanimous)	3	3:00	Road to ONE Muay Thai W.Atomweight Quarter-finals
Flyweight 61 kg	(Greece) Angelos Giakoumis	def.	(Thailand) Phadetsuk Fairtex	TKO (Punches)	1	1:06	Road to ONE Muay Thai Flyweight Alternate bout

== Road to ONE: Thailand 2 ==
Road to ONE: Thailand 2
- Promotion: ONE Championship; Fairtex Fight Promotion
- Date: August 13, 2022
- Venue: Lumpinee Boxing Stadium
- City: Bangkok, Thailand

Road to ONE: Thailand 2 was a Combat sport event held by ONE Championship in partnership with Fairtex Fight Promotion on August 13, 2022, at the Lumpinee Boxing Stadium in Bangkok, Thailand.

=== Background ===
The event Week 2 of the featherweight, flyweight and women's atomweight Road to ONE Muay Thai tournaments, with the champion receiving a US$100,000 contract to compete in ONE Championship.

=== Results ===
Road to ONE: Thailand 2
Weight Class				Method	Round	Time	Notes
Featherweight 70 kg	(Thailand) Avatar Tor.Morsri	def.	(Thailand) Wanchalerm Pakyok P.K.	Decision (Unanimous)	3	3:00	Road to ONE Muay Thai Featherweight Quarter-finals
Flyweight 61 kg	(Thailand) Thai Sor.Jor.Piek Uthai	def.	(Thailand) Moradotphet Petchyindee Academy	TKO (Punches)	2	2:00	Road to ONE Muay Thai Flyweight Quarter-finals
Featherweight 70 kg	Kannorasingh D.N.A.Thailand	def.	(China) Wong Fei Hong	Decision (Unanimous)	3	3:00	Road to ONE Muay Thai Featherweight Quarter-finals
W.Atomweight 52 kg	(Thailand) Lommanee Thelegend Arena	def.	(Thailand) Nongaam Fairtex	Decision (Unanimous)	3	3:00	Road to ONE Muay Thai W.Atomweight Quarter-finals
Flyweight 61 kg	(Myanmar) Sonrak Sit Por.Jor.Wor.	def.	(Thailand) Tiw Fairtex	TKO (Elbow and Punch)	2	1:28	Road to ONE Muay Thai Flyweight Quarter-finals
W.Atomweight 52 kg	(Australia) Celest Phuketsingha Muaythai	def.	(Thailand) Phetsinin Sor.Phuangthong	TKO (Punches)	2	2:46	Road to ONE Muay Thai W.Atomweight Quarter-finals
Featherweight 70 kg	(Thailand) Vessuwan Por.Charoenphaet	def.	(Thailand) Yokthai Khunsuekmuaythai	Decision (Split)	3	3:00	Road to ONE Muay Thai Featherweight Alternate bout

== ONE 160: Ok vs. Lee 2 ==
ONE 160: Ok vs. Lee 2
- Promotion: ONE Championship
- Date: August 26, 2022
- Venue: Singapore Indoor Stadium
- City: Singapore

ONE Championship 160: Ok vs. Lee 2 was a Combat sport event held by ONE Championship on August 26, 2022, at the Singapore Indoor Stadium in Kallang, Singapore.

=== Background ===
The main event of the evening featured a rematch for the ONE Lightweight Championship between the defending champion Ok Rae Yoon and the former champion Christian Lee.

A ONE Featherweight Championship bout between current champion Thanh Le and Tang Kai is expected to co-headline the event.

The event featured a semi-final of the ONE Muay Thai Flyweight Grand Prix between Walter Goncalves and Superlek Kiatmoo9, as well as one Grand Prix alternate bout.

=== Results ===
ONE 160
Weight Class				Method	Round	Time	Notes
Lightweight 77 kg	(United States) Christian Lee	def.	(South Korea) Ok Rae Yoon (c)	TKO (knees)	2	1:00	For the ONE Lightweight Championship
Featherweight 70 kg	(China) Tang Kai	def.	(United States) Thanh Le (c)	Decision (unanimous)	5	5:00	For the ONE Featherweight Championship
Bantamweight 66 kg	(Thailand) Saemapetch Fairtex	def.	(Thailand) Rittewada Petchyindee Academy	KO (punch)	2	1:35	Muay Thai
Featherweight 70 kg	(Malaysia) Keanu Subba	def.	(Singapore) Amir Khan	KO (punch)	1	3:29	
Heavyweight 120 kg	(Croatia) Martin Batur	vs.	(England) Paul Elliott	No Contest (overturned)	1	3:38	Originally a TKO (punches and elbows) win for Batur; later changed to no contest after Batur tested positive for an Anabolic steroid. A banned substance according to the World Anti-Doping Agency (WADA).
Lightweight 77 kg	(Norway) Tommy Langaker	def.	(Brazil) Renato Canuto	Decision (unanimous)	1	10:00	Submission Grappling
Flyweight 61 kg	(India) Kantharaj Agasa	def.	(Brazil) Thales Nakassu	TKO (punches)	1	2:55	

== ONE on Prime Video 1: Moraes vs. Johnson 2 ==
ONE on Prime Video 1: Moraes vs. Johnson 2
- Promotion: ONE Championship
- Date: August 27, 2022
- Venue: Singapore Indoor Stadium
- City: Singapore

ONE on Prime Video 1: Moraes vs. Johnson 2 (also known as ONE Fight Night 1 outside the Americas) was a Combat sport event held by ONE Championship on August 27, 2022, at the Singapore Indoor Stadium in Kallang, Singapore.

=== Background ===
This was the card for ONE Championship debut to air on Amazon Prime Video.

A ONE Flyweight Championship rematch between current champion Adriano Moraes and former UFC Flyweight Champion (also 2019 ONE Flyweight World Grand Prix Champion) Demetrious Johnson is expected to headline the event. The pairing previously met at ONE on TNT 1 in April 2021 where Moraes defeated Johnson by Knockout in Round 2.

The co-main event of the evening featured a title fight for the ONE Muay Thai Bantamweight Championship between the champion Nong-O Gaiyanghadao and the challenger Liam Harrison.

The event was to feature a semi-final of the ONE Flyweight Muay Thai World Grand Prix between current ONE Flyweight Muay Thai World Champion Rodtang Jitmuangnon and Savvas Michael with the winner advancing to the World Grand Prix final. However, Rodtang was forced to withdraw due to failed to provide a sample for the organization's mandatory hydration test and was not permitted to weigh in and was replaced by Panpayak Jitmuangnon who scheduled against Sherzod Kabutov in preliminary card.

A Flyweight Muay Thai bout between former ONE Flyweight Muay Thai World Champion Jonathan Haggerty and Amir Naseri was expected to take place at the event. However, Haggerty forced to withdraw from the contest due to a non-COVID related illness.

At the weigh-ins, two fighters missed weight for their respective bouts. Itsuki Hirata weighed in at 119.25 pounds, 4.25 lbs over the Atomweight non-title fight limit. Zebaztian Kadestam weighed in at 188.5 pounds, 3.5 lbs over the welterweight non-title fight limit. Both bouts proceeded at catchweight. Kadestam was fined 30% of their purse, which went to their opponent Iuri Lapicus; Hirata was fined 50% of their purse, which went to their opponent Lin Heqin.

=== Results ===
ONE on Prime Video 1
Weight Class				Method	Round	Time	Notes
Flyweight 61 kg	(United States) Demetrious Johnson	def.	(Brazil) Adriano Moraes (c)	KO (Flying Knee)	4	3:50	For the ONE Flyweight Championship
Bantamweight 66 kg	(Thailand) Nong-O Gaiyanghadao (c)	def.	(England) Liam Harrison	KO (Leg Kick)	1	2:10	For the ONE Muay Thai Bantamweight Championship
Flyweight 61 kg	(Thailand) Panpayak Jitmuangnon	def.	(Cyprus) Savvas Michael	KO (Head Kick)	2	0:10	ONE Muay Thai Flyweight Grand Prix Semi-final
Heavyweight 120 kg	(Brazil) Marcus Almeida	def.	(Belarus) Kirill Grishenko	Submission (Heel Hook)	1	1:04	
Heavyweight 120 kg	(Iran) Amir Aliakbari	def.	(Italy) Mauro Cerilli	TKO (Elbows)	2	4:02	
Lead Card
Flyweight 61 kg	(Thailand) Superlek Kiatmoo9	def.	(Brazil) Walter Goncalves	KO (Elbow)	1	1:35	ONE Muay Thai Flyweight Grand Prix Semi-final
W.Catchweight 52 kg	(Australia) Diandra Martin	def.	(England) Amber Kitchen	Decision (unanimous)	3	3:00	Muay Thai
Catchweight 54 kg	(Japan) Itsuki Hirata	def.	(China) Lin Heqin	Decision (unanimous)	3	5:00	Hirata missed weight (119.25 lbs).
Welterweight 84 kg	(Sweden) Zebaztian Kadestam	def.	(Moldova) Iuri Lapicus	KO (punch)	1	0:57	Kadestam missed weight (188.5 lbs).

== Road to ONE: Muay Thai Grand Prix Liverpool ==
Road to ONE: MTGP Liverpool
- Promotion: ONE Championship; Muay Thai Grand Prix
- Date: September 10, 2022
- Venue: Eventim Olympia
- City: Liverpool, England

Road to ONE: Muay Thai Grand Prix Liverpool was a Muay Thai event held by ONE Championship in partnership with Muay Thai Grand Prix on September 10, 2022, at the Eventim Olympia in Liverpool, England.

=== Background ===
The event featured first part of an eight-man tournament for the Road to ONE Muay Thai Grand Prix Bantamweight tournament, with the champion receiving a US$100,000 contract to compete in ONE Championship.

=== Results ===
Road to ONE: Muay Thai Grand Prix Liverpool
Weight Class				Method	Round	Time	Notes
Catchweight 72.5 kg	(England) Joe Craven	def.	(Italy) Jacopo Tarantino	KO (Punches)	3	0:47	For the Muay Thai Grand Prix European Title
Bantamweight 66 kg	(Republic of Ireland) Craig Coakley	def.	(Sweden) Kim Falk	Decision (Unanimous)	3	3:00	Road to ONE Muay Thai Grand Prix Quarter-finals
Bantamweight 66 kg	(England) Natty Dodds	def.	(Egypt) Amro Ghanem	KO (Elbow)	1	1:15	Road to ONE Muay Thai Grand Prix Quarter-finals
W.Atomweight 52 kg	(England) Becky Caslin	def.	(Norway) Anne Line Hogstad	Decision (Unanimous)	3	3:00	
Catchweight 75 kg	(Moldova) Ion Cecan	def.	(England) Yves Brusnello	TKO (Punches)	3	0:42	
Catchweight 57 kg	(Honduras) Kenneth Cruz	-	(England) Ian Gibson	Draw (Split)	3	3:00	
Catchweight 53.5 kg	(England) Naz Powell	def.	(England) Josh Cooper	Decision (Unanimous)	3	3:00	
W.Catchweight 55 kg	(England) Kesia Dempsey	def.	(England) Mia Trevorrow	Decision (Unanimous)	3	3:00	
Flyweight 61 kg	(England) Joe Huges	def.	(England) Adam O'driscoll	Decision (Unanimous)	3	3:00	

== Road to ONE: Thailand 3 ==
Road to ONE: Thailand 3
- Promotion: ONE Championship; Fairtex Fight Promotion
- Date: September 17, 2022
- Venue: Lumpinee Boxing Stadium
- City: Bangkok, Thailand

Road to ONE: Thailand 3 was a Combat sport event held by ONE Championship in partnership with Fairtex Fight Promotion on September 17, 2022, at the Lumpinee Boxing Stadium in Bangkok, Thailand.

=== Background ===
The event featured semi-final of the featherweight, flyweight and women's atomweight Road to ONE Muay Thai tournaments, with the champion receiving a US$100,000 contract to compete in ONE Championship.

A tournament Featherweight Muay Thai bout between Yodphupha Tor. Yotha and YodIQ P.K.Saenchai Muaythaigym was scheduled take place at the event. However, YodIQ withdraw due to flu symptoms and was replaced by Kwangtung Realfighter.

=== Results ===
Road to ONE: Thailand 3
Weight Class				Method	Round	Time	Notes
Flyweight 61 kg	(Thailand) Dedduanglek Sor.Sommai	def.	(Thailand) Thai Sor.Jor.Piek Uthai	Decision (Unanimous)	3	3:00	Road to ONE Muay Thai Flyweight Semi-finals
Featherweight 70 kg	(Thailand) Yodphupha Tor. Yotha	def.	(Thailand) Kwangtung Realfighter	TKO (Punches)	1	1:22	Road to ONE Muay Thai Featherweight Semi-finals
Flyweight 61 kg	(Myanmar) Sonrak Sit Por.Jor.Wor.	def.	(Thailand) Starboy Petchkiatphet	TKO (Doctor Stoppage)	1	2:48	Road to ONE Muay Thai Flyweight Semi-finals
W.Atomweight 52 kg	(Australia) Celest Phuketsingha Muaythai	def.	(Thailand) Duangdawnoi Looksaikongdin	Decision (Unanimous)	3	3:00	Road to ONE Muay Thai W.Atomweight Semi-finals
Featherweight 70 kg	(Thailand) Avatar Tor.Morsri	def.	Kaennorasingh D.N.A. Thailand	TKO (Punches)	2	1:29	Road to ONE Muay Thai Featherweight Semi-finals
W.Atomweight 52 kg	(Thailand) Lommanee Thelegend Arena	def.	(Thailand) Kamlaipetch Petchyindee Academy	Decision (Unanimous)	3	3:00	Road to ONE Muay Thai W.Atomweight Semi-finals
Featherweight 70 kg	(Thailand) Petchudom Mor.Kankelachaiyaphum	def.	(Thailand) Vessuwan Por.Charoenphaet	Decision (Unanimous)	3	3:00	

== ONE 161: Petchmorakot vs. Tawanchai ==
ONE 161: Petchmorakot vs. Tawanchai
- Promotion: ONE Championship
- Date: September 29, 2022
- Venue: Singapore Indoor Stadium
- City: Singapore

ONE 161: Petchmorakot vs. Tawanchai was a Combat sport event held by ONE Championship on September 29, 2022, at the Singapore Indoor Stadium in Kallang, Singapore.

=== Background ===
A ONE Heavyweight World Championship title unification bout between current champion Arjan Bhullar and interim champion Anatoly Malykhin is expected to headline the event. However, Bhullar withdrew from the event due to an arm injury.

A ONE Muay Thai Featherweight Championship bout between current champion Petchmorakot Petchyindee and #1 ranked contender Tawanchai P.K.Saenchai is expected that this event.

The event will also feature the semi-finals of the ONE Heavyweight Kickboxing World Grand Prix.

At the weigh-ins, Han Zihao weighed in at 154.75 lb, 8.75 lb over the bantamweight non-title fight limit of 145 pounds. the bout agreed to moved to the featherweight division (145–155 lbs) where Han was fined 30%, which went to Ferrari Fairtex. Wang Shuo came in at 139.5 pounds, 3.5 pounds over the flyweight non-title limit. The bout was later scrapped after Wang Shuo pulled out of the bout.

=== Fight card ===
ONE 161
Weight Class				Method	Round	Time	Notes
Featherweight 70 kg	(Thailand) Tawanchai P.K.Saenchai	def.	(Thailand) Petchmorakot Petchyindee (c)	Decision (Unanimous)	5	3:00	For the ONE Muay Thai Featherweight Championship
Heavyweight 120 kg	(Ukraine) Roman Kryklia	def.	(Brazil) Guto Inocente	TKO (Head Kick)	1	0:52	ONE Kickboxing Heavyweight Grand Prix Semi-finals
Heavyweight 120 kg	(Iran) Iraj Azizpour	def.	(Brazil) Bruno Chaves	Decision (Unanimous)	3	3:00	ONE Kickboxing Heavyweight Grand Prix Semi-finals
Lightweight 77 kg	(Russia) Saygid Izagakhmaev	def.	(China) Zhang Lipeng	Decision (Unanimous)	3	5:00	
W.Atomweight 52 kg	(Singapore) Tiffany Teo	def.	(India) Ritu Phogat	Submission (Rear-Naked Choke)	1	4:52	
Heavyweight 120 kg	(Senegal) Oumar Kane	def.	(Russia) Batradz Gazzaev	TKO (punches)	2	2:15	
Lead Card
Bantamweight 66 kg	(Russia) Alaverdi Ramazanov	def.	(Thailand) Capitan Petchyindee	Decision (Split)	3	3:00	Muay Thai
Bantamweight 66 kg	(Thailand) Sangmanee P.K.Saenchai	def.	(China) Zhang Chenglong	Decision (Split)	3	3:00	Muay Thai
Bantamweight 66 kg	(Thailand) Ferrari Fairtex	def.	(China) Han Zihao	Decision (Unanimous)	3	3:00	Muay Thai; Originally announced as a Bantamweight bout, after changed to Featherweight bout due to Han Zihao missing weight
Bantamweight 66 kg	(Brazil) Rodrigo Marello	def.	(Russia) Ruslan Bagdasarian	Submission (Ankle Lock)	1	0:15	Submission Grappling
Middleweight 93 kg	(Iran) Ali Foladi	def.	(Brazil) Matheus Felipe	KO (Punch)	1	4:20	

== ONE on Prime Video 2: Xiong vs. Lee 3 ==
ONE on Prime Video 2: Xiong vs. Lee 3
- Promotion: ONE Championship
- Date: September 30, 2022
- Venue: Singapore Indoor Stadium
- City: Singapore

ONE on Prime Video 2: Lee vs. Xiong 3 (also known as ONE Fight Night 2 outside the Americas) was a Combat sport event held by ONE Championship on September 30, 2022, at the Singapore Indoor Stadium in Kallang, Singapore.

=== Background ===
A ONE Women's Strawweight Championship bout and trilogy between current champion Xiong Jingnan and current ONE Women's Atomweight Champion Angela Lee headlined the event. The pairing first met at ONE: A New Era on March 31, 2019, where Xiong won by knockout in fifth round. Their second meeting took place at ONE: Century on October 13, 2019, in ONE Women's Atomweight World Championship bout, where Lee defended the title by submission in fifth round.

A ONE Featherweight Kickboxing World Championship bout between current champion Superbon Singha Mawynn and former K-1 Super Welterweight Champion (also 2022 ONE Featherweight Kickboxing World Grand Prix Champion) Chingiz Allazov is expected to take place at the co-main event.

An inaugural ONE Flyweight Submission Grappling World Championship bout between Mikey Musumeci and Cleber Sousa was expected to take place at the event. It was also the submission grappling title in the promotion's history.

=== Fight card ===
ONE on Prime Video 2
Weight Class				Method	Round	Time	Notes
W.Strawweight 57 kg	(China) Xiong Jingnan (c)	def.	(United States) Angela Lee	Decision (Unanimous)	5	5:00	For the ONE Women's Strawweight Championship
Flyweight 61 kg	(United States) Mikey Musumeci	def.	(Brazil) Cleber Sousa	Decision (Unanimous)	1	10:00	For the inaugural ONE Submission Grappling Flyweight Championship
W.Catchweight 55 kg	(Thailand) Stamp Fairtex	def.	(Malaysia) Jihin Radzuan	Decision (Unanimous)	3	5:00	
Featherweight 70 kg	(Russia) Ilya Freymanov	def.	(Australia) Martin Nguyen	TKO (Submission to Knees)	1	3:33	
Lightweight 77 kg	(Turkey) Halil Amir	def.	(Russia) Timofey Nastyukhin	TKO (Punches)	2	0:58	
Lead Card
Featherweight 70 kg	(Armenia) Marat Grigorian	def.	(Turkey) Tayfun Ozcan	Decision (Unanimous)	3	3:00	Kickboxing
Featherweight 70 kg	(South Korea) Oh Ho Taek	def.	(Japan) Ryogo Takahashi	Decision (Split)	3	5:00	
W.Catchweight 52.2 kg	(France) Anissa Meksen	def.	(Thailand) Dangkongfah Banchamek	Decision (Unanimous)	3	3:00	Muay Thai
Heavyweight 120 kg	(Serbia) Rade Opačić	def.	(Greece) Giannis Stoforidis	TKO (Punches)	2	1:52	ONE Kickboxing Heavyweight Grand Prix Alternate Bout

== Road to ONE: Muay Thai Grand Prix Sheffield ==
Road to ONE: MTGP Sheffield
- Promotion: ONE Championship; Muay Thai Grand Prix
- Date: October 1, 2022
- Venue: Magna Centre
- City: Sheffield, England

Road to ONE: Muay Thai Grand Prix Sheffield was a Combat sport event held by ONE Championship in partnership with Muay Thai Grand Prix on October 1, 2022, at the Magna Centre in Sheffield, England.

=== Background ===
The event featured second part of an eight-man tournament for the Road to ONE Muay Thai Grand Prix Bantamweight tournament, with the champion receiving a US$100,000 contract to compete in ONE Championship.

=== Results ===
Road to ONE: Muay Thai Grand Prix Sheffield
Weight Class				Method	Round	Time	Notes
Bantamweight 66 kg	(Greece) George Mouzakitis	def.	(Italy) Luca D'isanto	Decision (Unanimous)	3	3:00	Road to ONE Muay Thai Grand Prix Quarter-finals
Bantamweight 66 kg	(England) Nathan Bendon	def.	(France) Mathias Phountoucos	Decision (Majority)	3	3:00	Road to ONE Muay Thai Grand Prix Quarter-finals
W.Atomweight 52 kg	(Wales) Elena Cresci	def.	(Scotland) Yasmin Nazary	Decision (Unanimous)	3	3:00	
Welterweight 84 kg	(Spain) Omar Moreno	def.	(England) James Ogden	TKO (Punches)	2	2:28	
Catchweight 63 kg	(England) Reece Robson	def.	(England) Kane Birring	Decision (Unanimous)	3	3:00	
W.Lightweight 66 kg	(Ukraine) Liliya Poda	def.	(England) Jess Lyons	Decision (Unanimous)	3	3:00	
W.Strawweight 57 kg	(England) Terri Houlton	def.	(England) Sammy Jo Luxton	Decision (Split)	3	3:00	
Catchweight 64 kg	(England) Ben Longstaff	def.	(Portugal) Lerrani Furtado	Decision (Unanimous)	3	3:00	
Featherweight 70 kg	(Latvia) Mareks Pelcis	def.	(England) Jamie Lee Mcgraffin	TKO (Knees and Punch)	1	0:56	
Catchweight 67 kg	(England) Nathan Riddle	def.	(England) Ciaran Smith	Decision (Unanimous)	3	3:00	
Catchweight 60 kg	(Scotland) Jamie McGowan	def.	(Republic of Ireland) Aaron Clarke	Decision (Unanimous)	3	3:00	
Catchweight 82 kg	(England) Steven Buckmire	def.	(England) Matty Hunton	TKO (Punches)	1	1:40	
Catchweight 68 kg	(England) Irtaza Haider	def.	(England) Nathaniel Kalogiannidis	TKO (Referee Stoppage)	1	1:15	
Bantamweight 65 kg	(England) Nathan Dryden	def.	(England) Marley Davies	Decision (Split)	3	3:00	

== Road to ONE: BEAST Championship 11 ==
Road to ONE: BEAST Championship 11
- Promotion: ONE Championship; BEAST Championship
- Date: October 8, 2022
- Venue: Gladstone Showground
- City: Gladstone, Australia

Road to ONE: BEAST Championship 11 was a Combat sport event held by ONE Championship in partnership with BEAST Championship on October 8, 2022, at the Gladstone Showground in Gladstone, Australia.

=== Background ===
The event featured a four-man tournament for the Road to ONE BEAST Championship Light Heavyweight tournament, with the champion receiving a US$100,000 contract to compete in ONE Championship.

Participant:

- (Australia) Priscus Fogagnolo
- (South Africa) Lyle Karam
- (Australia) Isi Fitikefu
- (Australia) Harry Grech

=== Fight Card ===
Road to ONE: BEAST Championship 11
Weight Class				Method	Round	Time	Notes
Bantamweight 66 kg	(Australia) Brodie Mayocchi	vs.	TBA				

== ONE 162: Zhang vs. Di Bella ==
ONE 162
- Promotion: ONE Championship
- Date: October 21, 2022
- Venue: Axiata Arena
- City: (Malaysia) Kuala Lumpur

ONE 162: Zhang vs. Di Bella was a Combat sport event held by ONE Championship on October 21, 2022, at the Axiata Arena in Kuala Lumpur, Malaysia

=== Background ===
The event was headlined by a vacant ONE Kickboxing Strawweight Championship bout between Zhang Peimian and promotional newcomer Jonathan Di Bella. Di Bella defeated Zhang by unanimous decision for the ONE Kickboxing Strawweight Championship.

=== Fight card ===
ONE 162
Weight Class				Method	Round	Time	Notes
Strawweight 57 kg	(Canada) Jonathan Di Bella	def.	(China) Zhang Peimian	Decision (Unanimous)	5	3:00	For the vacant ONE Kickboxing Strawweight Championship
Flyweight 61 kg	(Australia) Reece McLaren	def.	(Brazil) Windson Ramos	TKO (Foot injury)	2	5:00	
Lightweight 77 kg	(Romania) Constantin Rusu	def.	(Russia) Islam Murtazaev	Decision (Unanimous)	3	3:00	Kickboxing
Strawweight 57 kg	(Cuba) Gustavo Balart	def.	(Brazil) Alex Silva	Decision (Split)	3	3:00	
Featherweight 70 kg	(France) Jimmy Vienot	def.	(Denmark) Niclas Larsen	Decision (Unanimous)	3	3:00	Muay Thai
Flyweight 61 kg	(Indonesia) Eko Roni Saputra	def.	(Thailand) Yodkaikaew Fairtex	Submission (Heel hook)	1	2:16	
Lead Card
Bantamweight 66 kg	(Russia) Artem Belakh	def.	(Brazil) Leandro Issa	Decision (Unanimous)	3	5:00	
Flyweight 61 kg	(Canada) Denis Puric	def.	(Russia) Tagir Khalilov	Decision (Unanimous)	3	3:00	Muay Thai
Welterweight 84 kg	(Kyrgyzstan) Ruslan Emilbek Uulu	def.	(United States) Ben Wilhelm	Submission (Rear-naked choke)	1	4:58	

== ONE on Prime Video 3: Lineker vs. Andrade ==
ONE on Prime Video 3: Lineker vs. Andrade
- Promotion: ONE Championship
- Date: October 22, 2022
- Venue: Axiata Arena
- City: Kuala Lumpur, Malaysia

ONE on Prime Video 3: Lineker vs Andrade (also known as ONE Fight Night 3 outside the Americas) was a Combat sport event held by ONE Championship on October 22, 2022, at the Axiata Arena in Kuala Lumpur, Malaysia.

=== Background ===
The main event featured ONE Middleweight Champion Reinier de Ridder defending his title against promotional newcomer Shamil Abdulaev.

The event will mark the promotion's return to Kuala Lumpur, Malaysia for the first time since ONE Championship 105: Mark Of Greatness in December 2019. Three championship belts were on the line during this event, namely the ONE Bantamweight Championship, the inaugural ONE Lightweight Submission Grappling Championship and the inaugural ONE Lightweight Muay Thai Championship.

Kade Ruotolo defeated Uali Kurzhev via heel hook to capture the ONE Lightweight Submission Grappling Championship, Regian 'The Immortal' Eersel defeated Sinsamut Klinmee via split decision to capture the ONE Lightweight Muay Thai Championship and the bout between John Lineker and Fabricio Andrade was declared a no contest after Lineker received an unintentional groin strike, leaving the ONE Bantamweight title vacant.

=== Fight card ===
ONE on Prime Video 3
Weight Class				Method	Round	Time	Notes
Bantamweight 66 kg	(Brazil) John Lineker	vs.	(Brazil) Fabricio Andrade	No Contest (accidental groin strike)	3	2:44	For the vacant ONE Bantamweight Championship
Lightweight 77 kg	(Suriname) Regian Eersel	def.	(Thailand) Sinsamut Klinmee	Decision (Split)	5	3:00	For the inaugural ONE Muay Thai Lightweight Championship
Lightweight 77 kg	(United States) Kade Ruotolo	def.	(Russia) Uali Kurzhev	Submission (heel hook)	1	4:26	For the inaugural ONE Submission Grappling Lightweight Championship
Featherweight 70 kg	(Thailand) Sitthichai Sitsongpeenong	def.	(Morocco) Mohammed Boutasaa	Decision (unanimous)	3	3:00	Kickboxing
Featherweight 70 kg	(Russia) Shamil Gasanov	def.	(South Korea) Kim Jae Woong	Submission (rear-naked choke)	1	2:09	
Lead Card
Strawweight 57 kg	(Philippines) Jeremy Miado	def.	(Australia) Danial Williams	TKO (punches)	3	0:31	
Flyweight 61 kg	(Japan) Taiki Naito	def.	(Iran) Amir Naseri	Decision (unanimous)	3	3:00	Muay Thai
Bantamweight 66 kg	(Algeria) Mehdi Zatout	def.	(United States) Asa Ten Pow	TKO (Retirement)	1	3:00	Muay Thai
W.Atomweight 52 kg	(France) Noelle Grandjean	def.	(United States) Lea Bivins	TKO (Punches)	1	4:01	
Postliminary card
Featherweight 70 kg	(South Korea) Yoon Chang Min	def.	(Malaysia) Keanu Subba	Decision (unanimous)	3	5:00	
Welterweight 84 kg	(Malaysia) Agilan Thani	def.	(Germany) Ilja Stojanov	Submission (rear-naked choke)	2	1:48	

== Road to ONE: Thailand 4 ==
Road to ONE: Thailand 4
- Promotion: ONE Championship; Fairtex Fight Promotion
- Date: October 29, 2022
- Venue: Lumpinee Boxing Stadium
- City: Bangkok, Thailand

Road to ONE: Thailand 4 was a Combat sport event held by ONE Championship in partnership with Fairtex Fight Promotion on October 29, 2022, at the Lumpinee Boxing Stadium in Bangkok, Thailand.

=== Background ===
The event featured final of the featherweight, flyweight and women's atomweight Road to ONE Muay Thai tournaments, with the champion receiving a US$100,000 contract to compete in ONE Championship.

=== Results ===
Road to ONE: Thailand 4
Weight Class				Method	Round	Time	Notes
Flyweight 61 kg	(Vietnam) Nguyen Quang Huy	def.	(Thailand) Inseenoi Sor.Samran	Decision (Unanimous)	3	3:00	
Lightweight 77 kg	(Romania) Alexandru Bublea	def.	Kannorasingh D.N.A. Thailand	Decision (Unanimous)	3	3:00	
W.Atomweight 52 kg	(Thailand) Petchseenin Sor.Puang Thong	def.	(Thailand) Pancake Kiat Thong Yot	Decision (Unanimous)	3	3:00	
Featherweight 70 kg	(Thailand) Yodphupha Wiman Air	def.	(Thailand) Yokthai Khunsuek Muaythai	KO (Leg Kicks)	4		Road to ONE Muay Thai Featherweight Final
Flyweight 61 kg	(Thailand) Dedduanglek Sor.Sommai	def.	(Myanmar) Sonrak Sit.Por Jor Wor	Decision (Unanimous)	5	3:00	Road to ONE Muay Thai Flyweight Final
W.Atomweight 52 kg	(Australia) Celest Phuket Singha Muaythai	def.	(Thailand) Lommanee The Legend Arena	Decision (Unanimous)	5	3:00	Road to ONE Muay Thai W.Atomweight Final
Flyweight 61 kg	(Thailand) Thai Sor.Jor.Piak Uthai	def.	(Greece) Angelos Giakoumis	Decision (Unanimous)	3	3:00	

== Road to ONE: Muay Thai Grand Prix London ==
Road to ONE: MTGP London
- Promotion: ONE Championship; Muay Thai Grand Prix
- Date: November 12, 2022
- Venue: Peninsula Square
- City: London, England

Road to ONE: Muay Thai Grand Prix London was a Combat sport event held by ONE Championship in partnership with Muay Thai Grand Prix on November 12, 2022, at the Peninsula Square in London, England.

=== Background ===
The event featured the semi-finals of an eight-man tournament for the Road to ONE Muay Thai Grand Prix Bantamweight tournament, with the champion receiving a US$100,000 contract to compete in ONE Championship.

=== Results ===
Road to ONE: Muay Thai Grand Prix London
Weight Class				Method	Round	Time	Notes
Bantamweight 66 kg	(Republic of Ireland) Craig Coakley	def.	(England) Natty Dodds	KO (Elbow)	2	1:35	Road to ONE Muay Thai Grand Prix Semi-finals
Bantamweight 66 kg	(England) Nathan Bendon	def.	(Greece) George Mouzakitis	Decision (Split)	3	3:00	Road to ONE Muay Thai Grand Prix Semi-finals
Featherweight 70 kg	(England) George Smith	def.	(Italy) Matteo Capobianco	KO (Punch)	2	0:28	
Lightweight 77 kg	(Brazil) Gabriel Augusto	def.	(England) Jimmy Killick	Decision (Unanimous)	3	3:00	
Catchweight 68 kg	(France) Fares Oumahamed	-	(Russia) Ibrahim Rostov	Draw (Majority)	3	3:00	
Muay Thai Grand Prix
Catchweight 59 kg	(England) Liam Patel	def.	(England) Kory Chettle	Decision (Split)	3	3:00	
Middleweight 95 kg	(Bulgaria) Daneil Iliev	def.	(Poland) Alan Zamkovski	TKO (Referee Stoppage)	1	1:39	
Catchweight 80 kg	(England) Karl Beck	def.	(England) Leon Jason	TKO (Referee Stoppage)	3	0:41	
Catchweight 72.5 kg	(Portugal) Joao Silva	def.	(England) Duane Barnes	Decision (Unanimous)	3	3:00	
Welterweight 85 kg	(England) Reece Rowell	def.	(Italy) Antonio Parlati	TKO (Punches)	3	1:45	
W.Catchweight 55 kg	(England) Kesia Dempsey	def.	(England) Farzana Shaukat	TKO (3 Knockdowns)	1	1:49	

== ONE on Prime Video 4: Abbasov vs. Lee ==
ONE on Prime Video 4: Abbasov vs. Lee
- Promotion: ONE Championship
- Date: November 19, 2022
- Venue: Singapore Indoor Stadium
- City: Kallang, Singapore

ONE on Prime Video 4: Abbasov vs. Lee (also known as ONE Fight Night 4) was a Combat sport event held by ONE Championship on November 19, 2022, at the Singapore Indoor Stadium in Kallang, Singapore.

=== Background ===
The competition was announced with a bout between former ONE Middleweight and Light Heavyweight World Champion Aung La Nsang and former UFC and WSOF Middleweight title contender Yushin Okami. However their fight was moved to ONE 163 on the same day.

=== Fight card ===
ONE on Prime Video 4
Weight Class				Method	Round	Time	Notes
Welterweight 84 kg	(Singapore) Christian Lee	def.	(Kyrgyzstan) Kiamrian Abbasov (c)	TKO (punches)	4	4:20	For the ONE Welterweight Championship (only Lee was eligible)
Flyweight 61 kg	(Thailand) Rodtang Jitmuangnon (c)	def.	(Italy) Joseph Lasiri	Decision (Unanimous)	5	3:00	For the ONE Muay Thai Flyweight Championship
Catchweight 69.5 kg	(Philippines) Stephen Loman	def.	(Brazil) Bibiano Fernandes	Decision (Unanimous)	3	5:00	
Welterweight 84 kg	(Brazil) Cosmo Alexandre	def.	(England) Juan Cervantes	TKO (knees and elbows)	2	1:23	Muay Thai
Bantamweight 66 kg	(South Korea) Kim Jae Woong	def.	(Philippines) Kevin Belingon	TKO (punches)	1	2:33	
Lead Card
Catchweight 66.1 kg	(England) Jonathan Haggerty	def.	(Russia) Vladimir Kuzmin	Decision (Majority)	3	3:00	Muay Thai
Welterweight 84 kg	(Kyrgyzstan) Ruslan Emilbek Uulu	def.	(Australia) Isi Fitikefu	Decision (Split)	3	5:00	
W.Atomweight 52 kg	(United States) Danielle Kelly	def.	(Russia) Mariia Molchanova	Submission (rear-naked choke)	1	2:15	Submission Grappling
Lightweight 77 kg	(England) Liam Nolan	def.	(United States) Eddie Abasolo	Decision (Unanimous)	3	3:00	Muay Thai

== ONE 163: Akimoto vs. Petchtanong ==
ONE 163: Akimoto vs. Petchtanong
- Promotion: ONE Championship
- Date: November 19, 2022
- Venue: Singapore Indoor Stadium
- City: Kallang, Singapore

ONE 163: Akimoto vs. Petchtanong will be a Combat sport event held by ONE Championship on November 19, 2022, at the Singapore in Kallang, Singapore.

=== Background ===
The main event will feature ONE Bantamweight Kickboxing Champion Hiroki Akimoto defending his title against Petchtanong Petchfergus.

=== Fight card ===
ONE 163
Weight Class				Method	Round	Time	Notes
Bantamweight 66 kg	(Thailand) Petchtanong Petchfergus	def.	(Japan) Hiroki Akimoto (c)	Decision (Split)	5	3:00	For the ONE Kickboxing Bantamweight Championship
Heavyweight 120 kg	(Ukraine) Roman Kryklia	def.	(Iran) Iraj Azizpour	TKO (Punches)	2	1:28	ONE Kickboxing Heavyweight Grand Prix Final
Lightweight 77 kg	(Russia) Saygid Izagakhmaev	def.	(Japan) Shinya Aoki	TKO (Punches)	1	1:26	
Middleweight 93 kg	(Myanmar) Aung La Nsang	def.	(Japan) Yushin Okami	TKO (Elbows and Punches)	1	1:42	
Bantamweight 66 kg	(South Korea) Kwon Won Il	def.	(New Zealand) Mark Abelardo	TKO (Knee and Punches)	3	3:34	
Lead Card
Heavyweight 120 kg	(Bosnia and Herzegovina) Ahmed Krnjic	def.	(Brazil) Bruno Chaves	Decision (Unanimous)	3	3:00	Kickboxing
Lightweight 77 kg	(Pakistan) Ahmed Mujtaba	def.	(Brazil) Abraao Amorim	Submission (Triangle choke)	1	4:32	
Strawweight 57 kg	(Japan) Asahi Shinagawa	def.	(Portugal) Rui Botelho	Decision (Split)	3	3:00	Muay Thai
W.Strawweight 57 kg	(Brazil) Bianca Basilio	def.	(Japan) Milena Kaori	Submission (Rear-naked choke)	1	0:42	Submission Grappling
Featherweight 70 kg	(Ukraine) Kirill Gorobets	def.	(Brazil) Bruno Pucci	Decision (Unanimous)	3	5:00	

== ONE on Prime Video 5: de Ridder vs. Malykhin ==
ONE on Prime Video 5: de Ridder vs. Malykhin
- Promotion: ONE Championship
- Date: December 3, 2022
- Venue: Mall of Asia Arena
- City: Manila, Philippines

ONE on Prime Video 5: de Ridder vs. Malylhin (also known as ONE Fight Night 5) will be a Combat sport event held by ONE Championship on December 3, 2022, at the Mall of Asia Arena in Manila, Philippines.

=== Background ===
ONE Light Heavyweight World Champion (and also the ONE Middleweight World Champion) Reinier de Ridder is set to make his first title defense against interim ONE Heavyweight World Champion Anatoliy Malykhin in the main event.

A welterweight bout between promotional newcomer and former KSW Champion Roberto Soldić and Murad Ramazanov was announced for the event.

=== Fight card ===
ONE on Prime Video 5
Weight Class				Method	Round	Time	Notes
Light Heavyweight 102 kg	(Russia) Anatoliy Malykhin	def.	(Netherlands) Reinier de Ridder (c)	TKO (Punches)	1	4:35	For the ONE Light Heavyweight Championship
Lightweight 77 kg	(United States) Kade Ruotolo (c)	def.	(Brazil) Matheus Gabriel	Decision (Unanimous)	1	10:00	For the ONE Submission Grappling Lightweight Championship
Welterweight 84 kg	(Croatia) Roberto Soldić	vs.	(Russia) Murad Ramazanov	No Contest (Accidental Knee to Groin)	1	2:01	
Lightweight 77 kg	(United States) Lowen Tynanes	def.	(South Korea) Dae Sung Park	Decision (Split)	3	5:00	
Lead Card
Welterweight 84 kg	(Brazil) Edson Marques	def.	(Philippines) Eduard Folayang	TKO (Punches)	2	2:53	
W.Strawweight 57 kg	(United States) Jackie Buntan	def.	(England) Amber Kitchen	Decision (Unanimous)	3	3:00	Muay Thai
W.Atomweight 52 kg	(Philippines) Denice Zamboanga	def.	(China) Lin Heqin	Decision (Split)	3	5:00	

== ONE 164: Pacio vs. Brooks ==
ONE 164
- Promotion: ONE Championship
- Date: December 3, 2022
- Venue: Mall of Asia Arena
- City: Manila, Philippines

ONE 164: Pacio vs. Brooks will be a Combat sport event held by ONE Championship on December 3, 2022, at the Mall of Asia Arena in Manila, Philippines.

=== Background ===
A ONE Strawweight World Championship title bout between current champion Joshua Pacio and the contender Jarred Brooks is expected to headline the event.

The event will mark the promotion's return to Manila, Philippines for the first time since ONE Championship 107: Fire & Fury in January 2020.

=== Fight card ===
ONE 164
Weight Class				Method	Round	Time	Notes
Strawweight 57 kg	(United States) Jarred Brooks	def.	(Philippines) Joshua Pacio (c)	Decision (Unanimous)	5	5:00	For the ONE Strawweight Championship
Catchweight 63 kg	(Thailand) Superlek Kiatmuu9	def.	(Thailand) Panpayak Jitmuangnon	Decision (Split)	3	3:00	ONE Muay Thai Flyweight Grand Prix Final
Heavyweight 120 kg	(Iran) Amir Aliakbari	def.	(United States) Brandon Vera	TKO (Elbows and Punches)	1	3:37	
Flyweight 61 kg	(China) Hu Yong	def.	(Philippines) Geje Eustaquio	KO (Punch)	1	4:43	
Bantamweight 66 kg	(Philippines) Jeremy Pacatiw	def.	(Myanmar) Tial Thang	Submission (Triangle Choke)	2	1:17	
Lead Card
Flyweight 61 kg	(Russia) Tagir Khalilov	def.	(Thailand) Chorfah Tor.Sangtiennoi	KO (Head kick)	1	2:29	Muay Thai
Bantamweight 66 kg	(Philippines) Drex Zamboanga	def.	(Philippines) Adonis Sevilleno	Decision (Unanimous)	3	5:00	
W.Atomweight 52 kg	(Spain) Lara Fernandez	def.	(Thailand) Dangkongfah Banchamek	Decision (Split)	3	3:00	Muay Thai
Catchweight 71 kg	(Philippines) Jhanlo Mark Sangiao	def.	(Philippines) Anacleto Lauron	Submission (Rear-Naked Choke)	1	1:48	
W.Catchweight 59.3 kg	(China) Meng Bo	def.	(Philippines) Jenelyn Olsim	KO (Punch and Elbows)	1	0:24	

== See also ==
- List of current ONE fighters
- 2022 in UFC
- 2022 in Bellator MMA
- 2022 in Absolute Championship Akhmat
- 2022 in Konfrontacja Sztuk Walki
- 2022 in Rizin Fighting Federation
- 2022 in LUX Fight League
- 2022 in AMC Fight Nights
- 2022 in Brave Combat Federation
- 2022 in Road FC
- 2022 Professional Fighters League season
- 2022 in Eagle Fighting Championship
- 2022 in Legacy Fighting Alliance
- 2022 in Glory
- 2022 in K-1
- 2022 in RISE
- 2022 in Romanian kickboxing
- 2022 in Wu Lin Feng
