= ONE 157 =

Combat sport events in 2022

ONE 157: Petchmorakot vs. Vienot
- The poster for ONE 157: Petchmorakot vs. Vienot
- Promotion: ONE Championship
- Date: May 20, 2022
- Venue: Singapore Indoor Stadium
- City: Kallang, Singapore

Event chronology
ONE 156: Eersel vs. Sadikovic	ONE 157: Petchmorakot vs. Vienot	ONE 158: Tawanchai vs. Larsen

ONE 157: Petchmorakot vs. Vienot was a combat sport event produced by ONE Championship that took place on May 20, 2022, at the Singapore Indoor Stadium in Kallang, Singapore.

== Background ==
A ONE Featherweight Muay Thai World Championship bout between current champion Petchmorakot Petchyindee and Jimmy Vienot headlined the event.

A ONE Strawweight Muay Thai World Championship bout between the champion Prajanchai P.K.Saenchai and title challenger Joseph Lasiri was expected to take place at ONE: Lights Out but it was postponed due to Lasiri getting injury during his training camp. They met at this event instead scheduled as the co-main event.

The quarterfinal bouts of the ONE Flyweight Muay Thai World Grand Prix Tournament will be held during the event.

A ONE Flyweight Muay Thai Grand Prix bout between current ONE Flyweight Muay Thai Champion Rodtang Jitmuangnon and Jacob Smith was expected to take place at ONE on TNT 1 in last April, but Smith withdraw from the bout due to injury. The pairing was rebooked for this event.

Two lightweight submission grappling matches were announced for the event: between former Featherweight title Challenger Garry Tonon and Tye Ruotolo, as well as between Former 2-time ONE Lightweight Champions Shinya Aoki and Kade Ruotolo.

A Heavyweight Kickboxing bout, Rade Opačić and Guto Inocente was scheduled for the event. However, the bout was pushed back to ONE 158 for Inocente tested positive for COVID-19.

A heavyweight bout between Marcus Almeida and Oumar Kane was scheduled for ONE 156. However, the bout was moved to this event due to Oumar Kane injury and was replaced by Hugo Cunha. However, Cunha tested positive for COVID-19 before the event and was replaced by Jasur Mirzamukhamedov. However, Mirzamukhamedov tested positive for COVID-19 After traveling to Singapore. the bout will be rescheduled for Buchecha and expected to return to action at ONE 158.

A Women's Atomweight bout between Alyse Anderson and Asha Roka was scheduled for ONE X. However, Anderson withdraw from the bout for medical reasons. The pairing was rebooked for this event.

Jonathan Haggerty was set to face Walter Goncalves in the quarter-finals of the ONE Flyweight Muay Thai World Grand Prix. However, Haggerty was forced to pull out of his bout at the last minute due to health issue and was replaced by Josue Cruz, who had been set to compete in a Grand Prix alternate bout against Panpayak Jitmuangnon earlier in the card.

== Results ==
Main Card (YouTube / Watch ONE)
Weight class				Method	Round	Time	Notes
Featherweight Muay Thai	Petchmorakot Petchyindee (c)	def.	Jimmy Vienot	Decision (split)	5	3:00	(Note: For the ONE Featherweight Muay Thai World Championship)
Strawweight Muay Thai	Joseph Lasiri	def.	Prajanchai P.K.Saenchai (c)	TKO (retirement)	3	3:00	(Note: For the ONE Strawweight Muay Thai World Championship)
Flyweight Muay Thai	Rodtang Jitmuangnon	def.	Jacob Smith	Decision (unanimous)	3	3:00	(Note: ONE Flyweight Muay Thai World Grand Prix Tournament Quarter-Final bout.)
Lightweight Submission Grappling	Tye Ruotolo	def.	Garry Tonon	Submission (D'Arce choke)	1	1:27
Lightweight Submission Grappling	Kade Ruotolo	def.	Shinya Aoki	Decision (unanimous)	1	10:00
Flyweight Muay Thai	Walter Goncalves	def.	Josue Cruz	TKO (knees)	1	0:35	(Note: ONE Flyweight Muay Thai World Grand Prix Tournament Quarter-Final bout.)
Lead Card (YouTube / Watch ONE)
Flyweight Muay Thai	Superlek Kiatmoo9	def.	Taiki Naito	Decision (unanimous)	3	3:00	(Note: ONE Flyweight Muay Thai World Grand Prix Tournament Quarter-Final bout.)
Flyweight Muay Thai	Savvas Michael	def.	Amir Naseri	Decision (unanimous)	3	3:00	(Note: ONE Flyweight Muay Thai World Grand Prix Tournament Quarter-Final bout.)
Women's Atomweight	Alyse Anderson	def.	Asha Roka	Submission (triangle choke)	1	2:04
Featherweight Kickboxing	Mohammed Boutasaa	def.	Davit Kiria	Decision (unanimous)	3	3:00
Women's Strawweight	Nat Jaroonsak	def.	Zeba Bano	Submission (armbar)	1	1:22
Flyweight Muay Thai	Sherzod Kabutov	def.	Denis Purić	Decision (unanimous)	3	3:00	(Note: ONE Flyweight Muay Thai World Grand Prix Tournament Alternate bout.)
Strawweight	Elipitua Siregar	def.	Robin Catalan	Submission (anaconda choke)	1	2:58

== Bonus awards ==
The following fighters received $50,000 bonuses.

- Performance of the Night: Petchmorakot Petchyindee, Joseph Lasiri, Rodtang Jitmuangnon and Tye Ruotolo

== See also ==
- 2022 in ONE Championship
- List of ONE Championship events
- List of current ONE fighters
