= ONE: Lights Out =

Combat sport events in 2022

- The poster for ONE: Lights Out
- Promotion: ONE Championship
- Date: March 11, 2022
- Venue: Singapore Indoor Stadium
- City: Kallang, Singapore

Event chronology
ONE: Full Circle	ONE: Lights Out	ONE X: 10 Years Anniversary

ONE: Lights Out was a Combat sport event produced by ONE Championship that took place on March 11, 2022, at the Singapore Indoor Stadium in Kallang, Singapore.

== Background ==
A ONE Featherweight Championship title bout between champion Thanh Le and title challenger Garry Tonon was scheduled as the main event.

ONE Bantamweight World Champion Bibiano Fernandes defends his belt against top-ranked contender John Lineker, and newly crowned ONE Strawweight Muay Thai World Champion Prajanchai PK.Saenchai makes his first title defense against #3-ranked Joseph Lasiri. after Lasiri Withdraw because of injury during training, Prajanchai vs Lasiri to cancelled and moved to ONE 157

Kirill Gorobets will make his promotional debut against former two-division ONE world champion Martin Nguyen.

== Results ==
Main Card (YouTube / Watch ONE)
Weight class				Method	Round	Time	Notes
Featherweight	Thanh Le (c)	def.	Garry Tonon	KO (punches)	1	0:56	(Note: For the ONE Featherweight World Championship.)
Bantamweight	John Lineker	def.	Bibiano Fernandes (c)	KO (punch)	2	3:40	(Note: For the ONE Bantamweight World Championship.)
Featherweight	Martin Nguyen	def.	Kirill Gorobets	TKO (punches)	3	2:18
Catchweight (273 lbs) Kickboxing	Iraj Azizpour	def.	Ismael Londt	KO (punch)	2	2:01	(Note: Londt missed weight (273 lbs).)
Strawweight	Adrian Mattheis	def.	Alex Silva	TKO (punches)	2	0:05
Strawweight Kickboxing	Zhang Peimian	def.	Josh Tonna	TKO (3 knockdown rules)	2	2:11
Lead Card (YouTube / Watch ONE)
Flyweight	Eko Roni Saputra	def.	Chan Rothana	Submission (rear-naked choke)	1	1:34
Women's Strawweight Muay Thai	Iman Barlow	def.	Daniela López	TKO (doctor stoppage)	1	1:39
Catchweight (174 lbs) Muay Thai	Liam Nolan	def.	Kim Kyung-lock	TKO (knees)	1	1:02
Women's Atomweight Kickboxing	Lin Heqin	def.	Milagros López	Decision (unanimous)	3	3:00

== Bonus awards ==
The following fighters received $50,000 bonuses.

- Performance of the Night: Thanh Le, John Lineker, Zhang Peimain, Iman Barlow and Liam Nolan

== See also ==
- 2022 in ONE Championship
- List of ONE Championship events
- List of current ONE fighters
