= ONE on Prime Video 2 =

Combat sport events in 2022

ONE on Prime Video 2: Xiong vs. Lee 3
- The poster for ONE on Prime Video 2: Xiong vs. Lee 3
- Promotion: ONE Championship
- Date: October 1, 2022 (Note: This event will be held of the morning on October 1, 2022 but prime time in the United States is September 30, 2022.)
- Venue: Singapore Indoor Stadium
- City: Kallang, Singapore

Event chronology
ONE 161: Petchmorakot vs. Tawanchai	ONE on Prime Video 2: Xiong vs. Lee 3	ONE 162: Zhang vs. Di Bella

ONE on Prime Video 2: Xiong vs. Lee 3 (also known as ONE Fight Night 2 outside North America) was a combat sport event produced by ONE Championship that took place on October 1, 2022 at the Singapore Indoor Stadium in Kallang, Singapore.

== Background ==
A ONE Women's Strawweight World Championship bout and trilogy between current champion Xiong Jing Nan and current ONE Women's Atomweight Champion Angela Lee headlined the event. The pairing first met at ONE: A New Era on March 31, 2019 where Xiong won by knockout in the fifth round. Their second meeting took place at ONE: Century on October 13, 2019 in ONE Women's Atomweight World Championship bout, where Lee defended the title by submission in the fifth round.

A ONE Featherweight Kickboxing World Championship bout between current champion Superbon Singha Mawynn and former K-1 Super Welterweight Champion (also 2022 ONE Featherweight Kickboxing World Grand Prix Champion) Chingiz Allazov was expected to take place as the co-main event. However, Allazov forced to withdraw due to an injury and was replaced by #5 ranked contender Tayfun Özcan who scheduled against former Glory Lightweight Champion Marat Grigorian in lead card and while Grigorian was booked to face Jamal Yusupov. In turn, Superbon and Yusupov withdrew from the event due to illness, so Özcan and Grigorian stepped back into the original pairing.

The inaugural ONE Flyweight Submission Grappling World Championship bout between Mikey Musumeci and Cleber Sousa took place at the event. It was also the first submission grappling title in the promotion's history.

At the weigh-ins, two fighters missed weight for their respective bouts. Dangkongfah Banchamek weighed in at 115.25 pounds, 0.25 lbs over the atomweight non-title fight limit. Jihin Radzuan weighed in at 120.25 pounds, 5.25 lbs over the atomweight non-title fight limit. Both bouts proceeded at catchweight. Dangkongfah was fined 20% of their purse, which went to their opponent Anissa Meksen; Radzuan was fined 30% of their purse, which went to their opponent Stamp Fairtex; Superbon Singha Mawynn and Jamal Yusupov have both not been medically cleared and both withdrew from the event.

== Results ==
Main card (Amazon Prime Video)
Weight class				Method	Round	Time	Notes
Women's Strawweight	Xiong Jing Nan (c)	def.	Angela Lee	Decision (unanimous)	5	5:00	(Note: For the ONE Women's Strawweight World Championship.)
Flyweight Submission Grappling	Mikey Musumeci	def.	Cleber Sousa	Decision (unanimous)	1	10:00	(Note: For the inaugural ONE Flyweight Submission Grappling World Championship.)
Catchweight (120.75 lbs)	Stamp Fairtex	def.	Jihin Radzuan	Decision (unanimous)	3	5:00	(Note: Radzuan missed weight (120.25 lbs). The bout moved change to Catchweight (120.75 lbs))
Featherweight	Ilya Freymanov	def.	Martin Nguyen	TKO (submission to knees)	1	3:33
Lightweight	Halil Amir	def.	Timofey Nastyukhin	TKO (punches)	2	0:58
Lead card (YouTube / Watch ONE)
Featherweight Kickboxing	Marat Grigorian	def.	Tayfun Özcan	Decision (unanimous)	3	3:00
Featherweight	Oh Ho-taek	def.	Ryogo Takahashi	Decision (split)	3	5:00
Catchweight (115.75 lbs) Muay Thai	Anissa Meksen	def.	Dangkongfah Banchamek	Decision (unanimous)	3	3:00	(Note: Dangkongfah missed weight (115.75 lbs))
Heavyweight Kickboxing	Rade Opačić	def.	Giannis Stoforidis	KO (punches)	2	1:52	(Note: ONE Heavyweight Kickboxing World Grand Prix Alternate bout.)

== Bonus awards ==
The following fighters received $50,000 bonuses.

- Performance of the Night: Ilya Freymanov and Halil Amir

== See also ==
- 2022 in ONE Championship
- List of ONE Championship events
- List of current ONE fighters
