= ONE: Heavy Hitters =

Combat sport events in 2022

- The poster for ONE: Heavy Hitters
- Promotion: ONE Championship
- Date: January 14, 2022
- Venue: Singapore Indoor Stadium
- City: Kallang, Singapore

Event chronology
ONE: Winter Warriors 2	ONE: Heavy Hitters	ONE: Only the Brave

ONE: Heavy Hitters (also known as ONE 150: Xiong vs. Miura) was a Combat sport event produced by ONE Championship that took place on January 14, 2022, at the Singapore Indoor Stadium in Kallang, Singapore.

== Background ==
The event was headlined by a ONE Women's Strawweight World Championship bout between current Champion Xiong Jingnan and Ayaka Miura.

A ONE Light Heavyweight Kickboxing World Championship bout between current champion Roman Kryklia and Murat Aygün was expected to take place at the event. The two were originally scheduled to fight at ONE Championship: Big Bang last year. However, in turn, Aygün has to withdraw on January 12 due to COVID-19, the bout was cancelled for the second time.

Filipino fighter Jeremy Miado and Robin Catalan will not be taking part in the upcoming event due to COVID-19. The pinoys opponents will thus face each other instead. Catalan, will return to action after a year against Elipitua Siregar on the card.

== Results ==
Main card (YouTube / ONE Super App)
Weight class				Method	Round	Time	Notes
Women's Strawweight	Xiong Jing Nan (c)	def.	Ayaka Miura	Decision (unanimous)	5	5:00	(Note: For the ONE Women's Strawweight World Championship.)
Catchweight (146.4 lbs) Muay Thai	Tawanchai P.K.Saenchai	def.	Saemapetch Fairtex	KO (punches)	1	2:55	(Note: Tawanchai missed weight (146.4 lb).)
Lightweight	Saygid Izagakhmaev	def.	James Nakashima	Submission (D'Arce choke)	2	2:17
Women's Strawweight Muay Thai	Supergirl Jarronsak	def.	Ekaterina Vandaryeva	Decision (split)	3	3:00
Strawweight	Senzo Ikeda	def.	Elipitua Siregar	KO (punch to the body)	3	2:00
Light Heavyweight Kickboxing	Giannis Stoforidis	def.	Beybulat Isaev	KO (punch)	1	0:31
Lead card (YouTube / Facebook / ONE Super App)
Women's Strawweight	Tiffany Teo	def.	Meng Bo	Submission (rear-naked choke)	2	3:45
Bantamweight	Shuya Kamikubo	def.	Troy Worthen	Submission (rear-naked choke)	3	4:36

== Bonus awards ==
The following fighters received $50,000 bonuses.

- Performance of the Night: Senzo Ikeda, Ekaterina Vandaryeva and Saygid Izagakhmaev

== See also ==
- 2022 in ONE Championship
- List of ONE Championship events
- List of current ONE fighters
