= Savvas Michael =

Cypriot muay thai fighter

- Born: February 17, 1999 (age 27); Limassol, Cyprus
- Other names: The Baby Face Killer; Michael Petchyindee Academy (ไมเคิ่ล เพชรยินดีอะคาเดมี่); Michael Or.Watmuaythaigym (ไมเคิล อ.วัฒน์มวยไทยยิม)
- Nationality: Cypriot
- Height: 178 cm (5 ft 10 in)
- Weight: 61.2 kg (135 lb; 9.64 st)
- Reach: 74 in (188 cm)
- Style: Muay Thai
- Stance: Orthodox
- Fighting out of: Bangkok, Thailand
- Team: Bangtao Muay Thai & MMA (Present); Petchyindee Academy (2017-2023); Lumpinee Gym (former)
- Years active: 2013 - present

Kickboxing record
- Total: 60
- Wins: 50
- By knockout: 24
- Losses: 10
- By knockout: 2

Savvas Michael (Greek: Σάββας Μιχαήλ; born February 17, 1999) is a Cypriot Muay Thai fighter. He is the current WBC Muaythai World Lightweight champion.

== Muay thai career ==
Michael made his professional debut against Abed Halaby in November 2013. He won the fight by a third-round knockout. He won his next four fights, before challenging Panagiotis Zissimopoulos for the WKU European title. Michael won the title by knockout. Michael would go on to win 20 of his next 21 fights, during which he won the ISKA European Lightweight Muay thai and WMC World Lightweight titles.

While his previous fights were mostly in the Greek muay thai circuit, after winning the WMC title, Michael began fighting almost exclusively in Thailand. He scored decision wins against Phetsongkom Sitjaroensub and Kaensuan Sasiprapa, as well as a KO win against Jomrachan Kiatworatha in the Rangsit Stadium. Michael participated in the 2018 Toyota Revo Marathon 135 lbs Tournament. He defeated Kongsuiya Sitnatee by decision in the quarterfinals, and Vladimir Lytkin by head kick in the finals, before facing Felipe Lobo in the finals. He beat Lobo by decision.

Michael entered the 2018 Toyota Revo Marathon 140 lbs Tournament as well. He beat Antonio Faria by decision in the semifinals, and Julio Lobo by decision in the finals.

He made his ONE Championship debut against Singtongnoi Por.Telakun at ONE Championship: Warriors Of Light, winning the fight by unanimous decision. He next knocked out Petngam Kiatkampon at the Rajadamnern Stadium, before returning to ONE to face Lerdsila Chumpairtour at ONE Championship: Dreams of Gold. Lerdsila won the fight by a second-round TKO.

In December 2019, Michael fought Dennanpho Sor Thanyaluk for the WBC Muaythai World Lightweight title. Savvas won the fight by a fourth-round TKO.

After his title win, Michael returned to ONE at ONE Championship: Warrior's Code against Taiki Naito. Naito won the fight by unanimous decision.

Michael faced the former Omnoi stadium champion Amir Naseri at ONE 157 on May 20, 2022, in the ONE Muay Thai Flyweight Grand Prix Quarter Final. He won the fight by unanimous decision.

Michael faced Panpayak Jitmuangnon in the quarterfinals of the ONE Muay Thai Flyweight Grand Prix at ONE on Prime Video 1 on August 27, 2022. He lost after getting knocked out with a head kick in the second round.

Due to a disagreement between his gym, Petchyindee Academy, and ONE Championship, all Petchyindee fighters were released from the promotion at the request of the gym.

== Championships and awards ==
=== Amateur ===
- Cyprus Muaythai Federation
  - 8x Cyprus National Muay Thai Champion
- World Muaythai Federation (WMF)
  - 2012 WMF Junior World Champion
  - 2013 WMF Junior World Champion
  - 2014 WMF Junior World Champion
  - 2014 WMF Pan-European Games Champion
  - 2014 WMF Junior European -60 kg Champion
  - 2015 WMF Junior European Champion
  - 2016 WMF Youth World -60 kg Champion
- International Sport Karate Association (ISKA)
  - 2015 ISKA K-1 European Champion

=== Professional ===
- World Kickboxing and Karate Union (WKU)
  - 2014 WKU Europe Champion
- International Sport Karate Association (ISKA)
  - 2016 ISKA Muay Thai European -60 kg Champion
- World Muaythai Council (WMC)
  - 2017 WMC World 135 lbs Champion
- Toyota Marathon
  - 2018 Toyota Hilux Revo Marathon 135 lbs Champion
  - 2018 Toyota Hilux Revo Marathon 140 lbs Champion
- World Boxing Council Muaythai
  - 2019 WBC Muay Thai World Lightweight Champion

== Muay Thai record ==
Kickboxing record
50 Wins (24 (T)KO's), 10 Losses
| Date | Result | Opponent | Event | Location | Method | Round | Time |
| 2026-04-11 | Win | (Thailand) Petchsamui Lukjaoporongtom | Rajadamnern World Series - April Inferno | Bangkok, Thailand | Decision (Unanimous) | 3 | 3:00 |
| 2026-01-31 | Win | (Thailand) Sitthisak Sor.Prasopchok | Rajadamnern World Series | Bangkok, Thailand | Decision (Unanimous) | 3 | 3:00 |
| 2025-06-22 | Loss | (Thailand) Superlek Jitmuangnon | Channel 7 Boxing Stadium | Bangkok, Thailand | Decision | 5 | 3:00 |
| 2024-11-30 | Loss | (Thailand) Samingdet Nor.Anuwatgym | Rajadamnern World Series | Bangkok, Thailand | Decision (Split) | 5 | 3:00 |
For the Rajadamnern Stadium Lightweight (135 lbs) title.
| 2024-07-13 | Loss | (Thailand) Samingdet Nor.Anuwatgym | Rajadamnern World Series | Bangkok, Thailand | Decision (Unanimous) | 5 | 3:00 |
For the Rajadamnern Stadium Lightweight (135 lbs) title.
| 2024-04-27 | Win | (Thailand) Jom Parunchai | Kiatpetch + Palangmai Roadshow | Surat Thani, Thailand | Decision | 5 | 3:00 |
| 2024-01-28 | Win | (Thailand) Rungsangtawan Sor.Parrat | Channel 7 Stadium | Bangkok, Thailand | KO (body kick) | 1 | |
| 2023-11-19 | Win | (Thailand) Petchmahachok Jitmuangnon | Muaydee VitheeThai + Jitmuangnon, OrTorGor.3 Stadium | Nonthaburi province, Thailand | Decision | 5 | 3:00 |
| 2023-09-09 | Win | (Thailand) YodPT Petchrungruang | LWC Superchamp, Lumpinee Stadium | Bangkok, Thailand | KO | 3 | |
| 2022-12-02 | Loss | (Thailand) Duangsompong Jitmuangnon | Rajadamnern World Series + Petchyindee, Rajadamnern Stadium | Bangkok, Thailand | Decision (Unanimous) | 3 | 3:00 |
| 2022-11-03 | Loss | (Slovakia) Joseph Jitmuangnon | Petchyindee, Rajadamnern Stadium | Bangkok, Thailand | Decision | 5 | 3:00 |
| 2022-08-27 | Loss | (Thailand) Panpayak Jitmuangnon | ONE on Prime Video 1 | Kallang, Singapore | KO (Head kick) | 2 | 0:15 |
ONE Flyweight Muay Thai World Grand Prix Semifinal.
| 2022-05-20 | Win | (Iran) Amir Naseri | ONE 157 | Kallang, Singapore | Decision (Unanimous) | 3 | 3:00 |
ONE Flyweight Muay Thai World Grand Prix Quarterfinal.
| 2021-10-24 | Win | (Spain) Oscar Crespo | SuperShowDown | Bolton, England | TKO (Body punches) | 2 | |
| 2020-02-07 | Loss | (Japan) Taiki Naito | ONE: Warrior's Code | Jakarta, Indonesia | Decision (Unanimous) | 3 | 3:00 |
| 2019-12-27 | Win | (Thailand) Dennanpho Sor Thanyaluk | Muaymanwansuk + Petchpiya, Lumpinee Stadium | Bangkok, Thailand | TKO (Referee Stoppage) | 4 | 1:43 |
Wins vacant WBC Muay Thai World Lightweight title.
| 2019-08-16 | Loss | (Thailand) Lerdsila Chumpairtour | ONE: Dreams of Gold | Bangkok, Thailand | TKO (Arm Injury/Thrown) | 2 | 0:40 |
| 2019-07-11 | Win | (Thailand) Petngam Kiatkampon | Petchyindee, Rajadamnern Stadium | Bangkok, Thailand | KO (Left Knee to the body) | 2 | |
| 2019-05-10 | Win | (Thailand) Singtongnoi Por.Telakun | ONE: Warriors of Light | Bangkok, Thailand | Decision (Unanimous) | 3 | 3:00 |
| 2019-03-21 | Win | (Thailand) Tawansuk SitAor.Boonshop | Suek Muay Thai Rajadamnern + Petchyindee, Rajadamnern Stadium | Bangkok, Thailand | KO (Front kick) | 3 | |
| 2019-02-21 | Win | (Thailand) Petchsongphak Sitjaroensap | Petchyindee, Rajadamnern Stadium | Bangkok, Thailand | KO (Punches) | 3 | |
| 2019-01-17 | Loss | (Thailand) Petchsongphak Sitjaroensap | Rajadamnern Stadium | Bangkok, Thailand | Decision | 5 | 3:00 |
| 2018-12-21 | Win | (Brazil) Julio Lobo | Toyota Revo Marathon Tournament, Final | Bangkok, Thailand | Decision | 5 | 3:00 |
Wins Toyota Revo Marathon 140 lbs Tournament.
| 2018-12-21 | Win | (Portugal) Antonio Faria | Toyota Marathon Tournament, Semi Final | Bangkok, Thailand | Decision | 5 | 3:00 |
| 2018-10-18 | Win | (Thailand) Raksommai Sor.Sommai | Rajadamnern Stadium | Bangkok, Thailand | KO (Straight to the body) | 3 | |
| 2018-09-28 | Win | (Thailand) Sornphet SamartPayakaroonGym | Petchyindee + True4u, Rangsit Stadium | Rangsit, Thailand | Decision | 5 | 3:00 |
| 2018-05-18 | Win | (Brazil) Felipe Lobo | Toyota Revo Marathon Tournament, Final | Thailand | Decision | 3 | 3:00 |
Wins Toyota Revo Marathon 135 lbs Tournament.
| 2018-05-18 | Win | (Russia) Vladimir Lytkin | Toyota Revo Marathon Tournament, Semi Final | Thailand | TKO (High kick) | 1 | |
| 2018-05-18 | Win | (Thailand) Kongsuiya Sitnatee | Toyota Revo Marathon Tournament, Quarter Finals | Thailand | Decision | 3 | 3:00 |
| 2018-03-17 | Win | (Thailand) Kaensuan Sasiprapa | Topking World Series | Thailand | Decision | 3 | 3:00 |
| 2018-02-23 | Win | (Thailand) Jomrachan Kiatworatha | Petchyindee + True4u, Rangsit Stadium | Rangsit, Thailand | KO (Punches) | 4 | 2:00 |
| 2017-12-08 | Win | (Thailand) Phetsongkom Sitjaroensap | Petchyindee + True4u, Rangsit Stadium | Rangsit, Thailand | Decision | 5 | 3:00 |
| 2017-09-29 | Win | (Belarus) Alexander Kernnanski | Petchyindee + True4u, Rangsit Stadium | Rangsit, Thailand | TKO (Referee Stoppage) | 2 | |
Wins WMC World 130 lbs title.
| 2017-09-08 | Win | (Thailand) Kaiwantae Kiatchatchai | Petchyindee + True4u, Rangsit Stadium | Rangsit, Thailand | TKO (Knee and elbows) | 4 | |
| 2017-06-25 | Win | (Italy) Yuri Gentile | The Rising Stars | Cyprus | KO | 3 | |
| 2017-05-19 | Win | (Thailand) Suanluang TBM Gym | Lumpinee Stadium | Bangkok, Thailand | Decision | 5 | 3:00 |
| 2017-04-28 | Loss | (Thailand) Phetsongkom Sitjaroensap | Toyota Revo Marathon Tournament, Semi Final | Thailand | Decision | 3 | 3:00 |
| 2017-04-28 | Win | (Thailand) Kundiew Payapkumpan | Toyota Revo Marathon Tournament, Quarter Finals | Thailand | KO (Left knee to the body) | 2 | |
| 2017-02-12 | Win | (United Kingdom) Jonno Chipchase | Tanko Muay Thai League | Manchester, England | KO (Body punches) | 5 | |
| 2017-01-28 | Win | (Poland) Lukasz Leczycki | KOK 43 World Championship 2017 In Nikosia | Nicosia, Cyprus | Decision | 3 | 3:00 |
| 2016-12-04 | Win | (Moldova) Stefan Sirbu | Cyprus Fighting Championship 2 | Cyprus | KO | 2 | |
| 2016-09-30 | Win | (Turkey) Serkan Rustemoglu | Prestige Fights 2 | Cyprus | Decision | 5 | 2:00 |
Defends ISKA Muay Thai European -60kg title.
| 2016-08-14 | Win | (Thailand) Numchai Huaiyaikombat | Max Muay Thai | Pattaya, Thailand | KO | 2 | |
| 2016-08-05 | Win | (Thailand) Suanluang TMB gym | True4u | Bangkok, Thailand | Decision | 5 | 3:00 |
| 2016-07-02 | Win | (Greece) Alexandros Maragkakis | The Castle Gladiators 2 | Cyprus | KO | 1 | |
| 2016-04-23 | Win | (Russia) Tagir Khalilov | Prestige Fights | Cyprus | Decision | 5 | 3:00 |
Wins ISKA Muay Thai European -60kg title.
| 2016-03-01 | Loss | (Jordan) Saif El Dine Zaqzouq | Beirut Fight Night | Beirut, Lebanon | Decision | 3 | 3:00 |
| 2016-01-23 | Win | (Greece) Christos Kesaris | Adrenaline Muay Thai Battling | Cyprus | TKO (Doctor Stoppage) | 4 | |
| 2015-08-22 | Win | (Thailand) Nongbuadaeng Sit Thongpond | Lumpinee Krikkrai, Lumpinee Stadium | Bangkok, Thailand | KO (Left Knee to the body) | 2 | |
| 2015-07-26 | Win | (Greece) Maximos Exidaris | International Top Fight Muay Thai | Cyprus | Decision | | |
| 2015-07-11 | Win | (Greece) Ioannis Tzakakos | Gladiator | Cyprus | | | |
| 2015-06-27 | Win | (Greece) Antonios Stroutzalis | K1MBO | Cyprus | TKO | 1 | |
| 2015-06-07 | Win | (Greece) Giannis Katsakos | Made for War | Cyprus | | | |
| 2015-05-09 | Win | (Greece) Kangelidis | Iron Challenge Cyprus | Cyprus | Decision (Unanimous) | | |
| 2014-12-21 | Win | (Greece) Panagiotis Zissimopoulos | The Ultimate Action Show | Cyprus | KO (Knee to the body) | | |
Wins WKU European title.
| 2014-08-02 | Win | (Bulgaria) | | Cyprus | TKO | 2 | |
| 2014-07-26 | Win | | | Cyprus | | | |
| 2014-04-13 | Win | (Greece) Petros Papoutsakis | Young Emperors | Cyprus | Decision | 3 | 3:00 |
| 2014-02-02 | Win | (Greece) Petros Papoutsakis | Clash of Titans | Cyprus | Decision | 3 | 3:00 |
| 2013-11-10 | Win | (Lebanon) Abed Halaby | Cyprus International Martial Arts Show | Cyprus | KO (elbow) | | |
Wins WKF title.
Legend: Win Loss Draw/No contest Notes

Amateur Muay Thai record (Incomplete)
| Date | Result | Opponent | Event | Location | Method | Round | Time |
|---|---|---|---|---|---|---|---|
| 2016-03 | Win | (Uzbekistan) Sherov Kholmirzaev | WMF World Championship 2016, Final | Bangkok, Thailand | | | |
Wins WMF Youth World -60kg title.
| 2016-03 | Win | (Brazil) Victor Decarvalo | WMF World Championship 2016, Semi Final | Bangkok, Thailand | | | |
| 2016-03 | Win | (Russia) Albert Arutiunian | WMF World Championship 2016, Quarter Final | Bangkok, Thailand | | | |
| 2014-09 | Win | (Greece) Andreas Koualis | WMF European Championship 2014, Final | Bucharest, Romania | | | |
Wins WMF Junior European -57kg title.
| 2014-09 | Win | (France) Adam Brahim | WMF World European 2014, Semi Final | Bucharest, Romania | Decision | 3 | 3:00 |
| 2014-09 | Win | (Indonesia) | WMF European Championship 2014, Quarter Final | Bucharest, Romania | KO (Elbow) | 2 | |
| 2014-03 | Win | (France) Serdal Arpaci | WMF World Championship 2014, Final | Pattaya, Thailand | TKO (Doctor Stoppage/Elbow) | | |
Wins WMF Junior World -57kg title.
| 2014-03 | Win | | WMF World Championship 2014, Semi Final | Pattaya, Thailand | | | |
| 2014-03 | Win | | WMF World Championship 2014, Quarter Final | Pattaya, Thailand | | | |
| 2013- | Win | (Cyprus) Giorgos Marousides | Mortal Combat 2 | Cyprus | Decision | 3 | 3:00 |
Legend: Win Loss Draw/No contest Notes

== See also ==
- List of male kickboxers
- List of WBC Muaythai world champions
