= Xiong Jingnan =

Chinese mixed martial artist

- Born: January 12, 1988 (age 38); Weishan County, Shandong, China
- Native name: 熊竞楠
- Other names: The Panda
- Height: 5 ft 5 in (1.65 m)
- Weight: 56 kg (123 lb; 8 st 11 lb)
- Division: Strawweight
- Reach: 64 in (163 cm)
- Style: Boxing, Sanda, Brazilian Jiu Jitsu
- Team: Phuket Top Team (2017–2018); Bali MMA (2018–2019); Evolve MMA (2019–present); The Block Bali (2024–present)
- Rank: Brown belt in Brazilian Jiu-Jitsu under Alex Silva
- Years active: 2014–present

Mixed martial arts record
- Total: 23
- Wins: 19
- By knockout: 11
- By submission: 1
- By decision: 7
- Losses: 4
- By knockout: 1
- By submission: 1
- By decision: 2

Other information
- Mixed martial arts record from Sherdog

Xiong Jingnan (Chinese: 熊竞楠; born January 12, 1988) is a Chinese mixed martial artist. Jingnan currently competes in the women's Strawweight division of the Ultimate Fighting Championship (UFC). She most notably competed in the Women's Strawweight and Women's Atomweight divisions of ONE Championship, where she was the inaugural and last ONE Women's Strawweight World Champion. She also competed for the MMA divisions of Kunlun Fight (KLF). Xiong is the first ever recognized Chinese World Champion in mixed martial arts history, and the first Chinese woman to hold a major world championship in the sport.

== Background ==
Xiong was born in Weishan County, Jining, Shandong province in 1988. Xiong was initially scouted and selected to the weightlifting program in a sports school. She began her martial arts journey at the age of 18 as a member of the Shandong women's boxing team and represented China internationally.

From a young age, she was influenced by Chinese martial arts movies, and she has always followed the principles and values that those movies showed. Of particular note, she loved The Swordsman. Besides standing up for the weak and bullied whenever she could, Xiong made many sacrifices which included moving away from home and foregoing many typical teenage activities to focus on training for competition.

After adding BJJ to her arsenal, she won a China Open BJJ championship. She then set her sights on competing in mixed martial arts and threw herself into it completely, training several times a day from morning to night.

== Mixed martial arts career ==
=== Early career ===
Xiong made her professional MMA debut in 2014, fighting exclusively in Kunlun Fight and amassed a record of 10–1 before signing with ONE Championship.

=== ONE Championship ===
Xiong made her promotional debut on December 9, 2017, at ONE Championship: Warriors of the World beating April Osenio.

==== ONE Women's Strawweight World Champion ====
Xiong then faced Tiffany Teo for the inaugural strawweight title on January 20, 2018, at ONE Championship: Kings of Courage. She stopped the Singaporean in the fourth round to win the ONE Women's Strawweight Championship belt. With the win, she became the first Chinese World Champion in mixed martial arts history.

Xiong was scheduled to make her first title defense against Laura Balin at ONE Championship: Battle for the Heavens on May 26, 2018. However, the whole event was cancelled and Xiong went on to successfully defend her title at ONE Championship: Pinnacle of Power on June 23, 2018.

Subsequently, Xiong successfully defended the title against Samara Santos Cunha at ONE Championship: Beyond the Horizon on September 8, 2018.

Xiong was scheduled to defend her title against reigning ONE Championship Atomweight Champion Angela Lee at ONE Championship: Heart of the Lion on November 9, 2018. However, on November 5, 2018, Lee revealed that she was forced off the card due to a back injury. The bout eventually took place at ONE Championship: A New Era, where Xiong became the first fighter to ever beat Lee.

==== Challenging for the Atomweight title ====
Xiong and Lee fought again in a rematch this time for Lee's Atomweight Championship at ONE Championship: Century Part 1 on October 13, 2019. Xiong lost by submission.

==== Return to Strawweight ====
She returned to strawweight to defend her ONE Women's Strawweight Championship at ONE Championship: Inside the Matrix in a rematch of the championship fight that first earned her title against Tiffany Teo. Surviving a late surge from Tiffany, Xiong defended her title, winning the fight via unanimous decision.

Xiong was then scheduled to defend her ONE Women's Strawweight Championship against Michelle Nicolini at ONE Championship: Empower on May 28, 2021. However, the event was postponed to take place on September 3, 2021, due to the COVID-19 pandemic. She won the bout via unanimous decision, avoiding going to the ground with her opponent and winning the striking exchanges.

Xiong defended her title against Ayaka Miura on January 14, 2022, at ONE: Heavy Hitters. She won the bout in dominant fashion via unanimous decision.

Xiong made her seventh strawweight title defense against the ONE Women's Atomweight (115 lbs) champion Angela Lee at ONE on Prime Video 2 on September 30, 2022. She retained her title by unanimous decision.

Xiong faced Nat "Wondergirl" Jaroonsak in a special-rules striking match where both fighters will only be allowed to punch using 4-oz gloves at ONE Fight Night 14 on September 29, 2023. At the weigh-ins, Xiong failed hydration despite making weight. The bout proceeded at a catchweight of 129 lbs, with Xiong being fined a percentage of her purse, which went to her opponent. She won the fight via technical knockout in the third round.

Xiong was scheduled to defend her ONE Women's Strawweight World Championship against Stamp Fairtex at ONE 168 on September 6, 2024. However, Stamp pulled out due to injury and the fight was canceled.

On March 26, 2026, it was announced that ONE Championship was shutting down the Women's Strawweight MMA division and releasing Xiong.

=== Ultimate Fighting Championship ===
On April 10, 2026, it was reported that Xiong signed with the UFC and made her debut against Angela Hill on May 30, 2026 at UFC Fight Night 277. She lost the fight via unanimous decision.

Xiong faced Julia Polastri on August 29, 2026, at UFC Fight Night 286. The bout was changed to a catchweight bout when both fighters missed weight, with Xiong weighing in at 117 pounds (1 pound over the limit) and Polastri at 118.5 pounds (2.5 pounds over the limit). Xiong lost the fight by knockout via a head kick in the first round.

== Gym affiliation ==
Xiong formerly represented Alliance China and Bali MMA and is now currently representing Evolve MMA. She does the bulk of her training at Bali MMA.

She previously trained at Phuket Top Team and represented the gym in her ONE debut against April Osenio.

She also currently trains at The Block Combat in Bali.

== Championships and accomplishments ==
=== Mixed martial arts ===
- ONE Championship
  - ONE Women's Strawweight Championship (Inaugural, one time; final)
    - Seven successful title defenses
  - Most wins in ONE Women’s Strawweight history (8)
  - Most total fight time in ONE Championship history (3:13:48)
  - Tied with Bibiano Fernandes, and Nong-O Hama for most consecutive title defenses in ONE Championship history (7)

== Mixed martial arts record ==
Professional record breakdown
23 matches	19 wins	4 losses
By knockout	11	1
By submission	1	1
By decision	7	2

Res.	Record	Opponent	Method	Event	Date	Round	Time	Location	Notes
Loss	19–4	Julia Polastri	KO (head kick)	UFC Fight Night: Nurmagomedov vs. Song	August 29, 2026	1	3:06	Shanghai, China	Catchweight (118.5 lb) bout; both fighters missed weight.
Loss	19–3	Angela Hill	Decision (unanimous)	UFC Fight Night: Song vs. Figueiredo	May 30, 2026	3	5:00	Macau SAR, China	
Win	19–2	Meng Bo	Decision (unanimous)	ONE Friday Fights 100	March 14, 2025	3	5:00	Bangkok, Thailand	Return to Strawweight; Xiong missed weight (117.6 lb).
Win	18–2	Angela Lee	Decision (unanimous)	ONE on Prime Video 2	October 1, 2022	5	5:00	Kallang, Singapore	Defended the ONE Women's Strawweight Championship (125 lb).
Win	17–2	Ayaka Miura	Decision (unanimous)	ONE: Heavy Hitters	January 14, 2022	5	5:00	Kallang, Singapore	Defended the ONE Women's Strawweight Championship (125 lb).
Win	16–2	Michelle Nicolini	Decision (unanimous)	ONE: Empower	September 3, 2021	5	5:00	Kallang, Singapore	Defended the ONE Women's Strawweight Championship (125 lb).
Win	15–2	Tiffany Teo	Decision (unanimous)	ONE: Inside the Matrix	October 30, 2020	5	5:00	Kallang, Singapore	Defended the ONE Women's Strawweight Championship (125 lb).
Loss	14–2	Angela Lee	Submission (rear-naked choke)	ONE: Century – Part 1	October 13, 2019	5	4:48	Tokyo, Japan	For the ONE Women's Atomweight Championship (115 lb).
Win	14–1	Angela Lee	TKO (body kicks and punches)	ONE: A New Era	March 31, 2019	5	1:37	Tokyo, Japan	Defended the ONE Women's Strawweight Championship (125 lb).
Win	13–1	Samara Santos Cunha	KO (punch)	ONE: Beyond the Horizon	September 8, 2018	3	1:22	Shanghai, China	Defended the ONE Women's Strawweight Championship (125 lb).
Win	12–1	Laura Balin	Decision (unanimous)	ONE: Pinnacle of Power	June 21, 2018	5	5:00	Beijing, China	Defended the ONE Women's Strawweight Championship (125 lb).
Win	11–1	Tiffany Teo	TKO (punches)	ONE: Kings of Courage	January 20, 2018	4	2:17	Jakarta, Indonesia	Return to Flyweight. Won the inaugural ONE Women's Strawweight Championship (125 lb).
Win	10–1	April Osenio	KO (punches)	ONE: Warriors of the World	December 9, 2017	1	3:44	Bangkok, Thailand	
Win	9–1	Alena Gondášová	TKO (elbows and punches)	Kunlun Fight MMA 7	December 15, 2016	2	4:13	Beijing, China	Flyweight bout.
Win	8–1	Julia Borisova	Decision (unanimous)	Kunlun Fight 51	September 10, 2016	3	5:00	Fuzhou, China	Strawweight debut.
Win	7–1	Mona Samir	TKO (punches)	Kunlun Fight 48	July 31, 2016	1	4:00	Jining, China	Flyweight bout.
Win	6–1	Daria Chibisova	TKO (elbows and punches)	Kunlun Fight 30	September 4, 2015	1	4:48	Dazhou, China	Bantamweight debut.
Loss	5–1	Colleen Schneider	Decision (unanimous)	Kunlun Fight 26	June 6, 2015	3	5:00	Chongqing, China	Catchweight (132 lb) bout.
Win	5–0	Victoria Godumchuk	TKO (knee to the body and punches)	Kunlun Fight 23	April 26, 2015	1	1:43	Changsha, China	Catchweight (132 lb) bout.
Win	4–0	Marina Lvova	TKO (punches)	Kunlun Fight 22	April 12, 2015	1	1:52	Changde, China	
Win	3–0	Liliya Kazak	TKO (punches)	Kunlun Fight 19	February 1, 2015	3	1:22	Guangzhou, China	
Win	2–0	Liubov Tiupina	TKO (punches)	Kunlun Fight 15	January 3, 2015	1	2:19	Nanjing, China	
Win	1–0	Inna Hutsal	Submission (armbar)	Kunlun Fight 9	August 31, 2014	1	0:50	Shangqiu, China	Flyweight debut.

== Special rules record ==
Professional record breakdown
1 match	1 win	0 losses
By knockout	1	0

Res.	Record	Opponent	Method	Event	Date	Round	Time	Location	Notes
Win	1–0	Wondergirl Jaroonsak	TKO (punches)	ONE Fight Night 14	September 30, 2023	3	2:42	Kallang, Singapore	Catchweight (129 lb) bout; Xiong missed weight. Special rules striking bout.

== Kickboxing record ==
Kickboxing record
Date	Result	Opponent	Event	Location	Method	Round	Time
2014-01-25	Win	(Ukraine) Lena Ovchynnikova	Kunlun Fight 1	Pattaya, Thailand	Decision (split)	3	3:00
Legend: Win Loss Draw/No contest Notes

== See also ==
- List of current UFC fighters
- List of female mixed martial artists
