= Rodlek P.K. Saenchaimuaythaigym =

Thai fighter (born 1990)

Rodlek P.K. Saenchai Muaythaigym
- Born: February 3, 1990 (age 36); Surat Thani, Thailand
- Other names: Rodlek Jaotalaytong (รถเหล็ก จ้าวทะเลทอง)
- Height: 168 cm (5 ft 6 in)
- Weight: 65.3 kg (144 lb; 10.28 st)
- Reach: 66 in (168 cm)
- Stance: Orthodox
- Fighting out of: Sydney, australia
- Team: Evolve MMA payak muay thai

Kickboxing record
- Total: 179
- Wins: 130
- Losses: 44
- Draws: 5

Rodlek P.K. Saenchai Muaythaigym (Thai: รถเหล็ก พี.เค.แสนชัยมวยไทยยิม; born February 3, 1990), also known as Rodlek Jaotalaytong, is a Muay Thai fighter. Rodlek is a former Channel 7 Boxing Stadium Champion and competed in ONE Championship.

== Career ==
Rodlek had his first Muay Thai fight, which took place at a temple fair, at the age of 10. He lost that fight. The loss motivated him to commit to training in Muay Thai, his initial goal being to beat his opponent in a rematch.

At the age of 12, he moved to the Jaotalaytong Gym. Upon finishing high school, Rodlek moved to Bangkok to build on his fighting career. It was in the country's capital where he also joined the Sitsongpeenong Gym, while also completing his bachelor's degree in management.

Rodlek made his name in Muay Thai with his repeated successes at the famed Channel 7 Boxing Stadium. On April 24, 2016, he would become the Channel 7 130lb Champion with a win over Nuenglanlek Jitmuangnon. He did regularly fight at both Lumpinee Stadium and Rajadamnern Stadium but did not find the same success as he did at the Channel 7 Stadium.

=== ONE Championship ===
Rodlek made his ONE Championship debut at ONE Championship: Legendary Quest in Shanghai on June 15, 2019. In his first ONE fight, he defeated Liam Harrison by unanimous decision. He then faced Andrew Miller at ONE Championship: Dawn of Heroes in the Philippines on August 2, 2019, where he knocked out Miller in the third round.

Rodlek was scheduled to face Chris Shaw at ONE Championship: Fire & Fury on January 31, 2020. At Fire & Fury, he was able to knock down Shaw in the final seconds of the third round before claiming the unanimous decision victory.

Rodlek faced Saemapetch Fairtex in the ONE Bantamweight Muay Thai Tournament semi-final at ONE Championship: No Surrender II on August 14, 2020. Despite losing by majority decision, Rodlek advanced to the tournament final when it was revealed that Saemapetch had sustained an injury.

At ONE Championship: A New Breed on August 28, 2020, Rodlek faced Kulabdam Sor.Jor.Piek-U-Thai in the ONE Bantamweight Muay Thai Tournament final. He knocked down Kulabdam twice, once in the second round and another in the third round, to secure the unanimous decision win. With the victory, Rodlek will face Nong-O Gaiyanghadao for the ONE Bantamweight Muay Thai World Championship. He then challenged Nong-O for the title at ONE Championship: Collision Course on December 18, 2020, losing the bout via third-round knockout.

In April 2022, Rodlek joined Evolve MMA in Singapore to work as a trainer.

== Titles and accomplishments ==
- ONE Championship
  - 2020 ONE Bantamweight Muay Thai Tournament winner
- World Professional Muaythai Federation
  - 2011 WPMF World 126lbs Champion
- Channel 7 Boxing Stadium
  - 2016 Channel 7 Boxing Stadium 130 lbs Champion

== Fight record ==
131 Wins, 44 Losses, 5 Draws
Date	Result	Opponent	Event	Location	Method	Round	Time
2024-12-07	Win	(Australia) Andy Juniku	Alliance Fight Promotion	Gold Coast, Australia	TKO (Low kicks)	2	
2024-11-02	Win	(Thailand) Pern SunsetMuayThai	Empire Fight Series	Perth, Australia	Decision	5	3:00
2024-09-21	Loss	(Australia) Albert Tu'ua	Muay Thai League 12	Gold Coast, Australia	Decision (Split)	5	3:00
2021-10-29	Loss	(Brazil) Felipe Lobo	ONE Championship: NextGen III	Kallang, Singapore	Decision (Unanimous)	3	3:00
2020-12-18	Loss	(Thailand) Nong-O Gaiyanghadao	ONE Championship: Collision Course	Kallang, Singapore	KO (Right cross)	3	1:12
For the ONE Bantamweight Muay Thai World Title
2020-08-28	Win	(Thailand) Kulabdam Sor.Jor.Piek-U-Thai	ONE Championship: A New Breed, Bantamweight Tournament Final	Bangkok, Thailand	Decision (Unanimous)	3	3:00
2020-07-31	Loss	(Thailand) Saemapetch Fairtex	ONE Championship: No Surrender 2, Bantamweight Tournament Semi-Final	Bangkok, Thailand	Decision (Majority)	3	3:00
2020-01-31	Win	(Scotland) Chris Shaw	ONE Championship: Fire & Fury	Pasay, Philippines	Decision (Unanimous)	3	3:00
2019-08-02	Win	(Scotland) Andrew Miller	ONE Championship: Dawn Of Heroes	Pasay, Philippines	KO (Punch)	3	0:49
2019-06-15	Win	(England) Liam Harrison	ONE Championship: Legendary Quest	Shanghai, China	Decision (Unanimous)	3	3:00
2018-08-21	Loss	(Thailand) Phetmorakot Maekjandi	Lumpinee Stadium	Bangkok, Thailand	Decision	5	3:00
2018-05-23	Loss	(Thailand) Rodtang Jitmuangnon	Rajadamnern Stadium	Bangkok, Thailand	Decision	5	3:00
2018-04-28	Loss	(Thailand) Saeksan Or. Kwanmuang	Phoenix 7 Phuket, Patong Boxing Stadium	Phuket, Thailand	Decision	5	3:00
For the WBC Muaythai Super-Lightweight World Championship.
2018-03-22	Loss	(Thailand) Mongkolkaew Sor.Sommai	Rajadamnern Stadium	Bangkok, Thailand	Decision	5	3:00
2018-02-08	Loss	(Thailand) Extra Sitworapat	Rajadamnern Stadium	Bangkok, Thailand	Decision	5	3:00
2017-12-29	Loss	(Thailand) Nuenglanlek Jitmuangnon		Thailand	Decision	5	3:00
2017-11-15	Loss	(Thailand) Yodlekpet Or. Pitisak	Rajadamnern Stadium	Bangkok, Thailand	Decision	5	3:00
2017-09-10	Loss	(Thailand) Saeksan Or. Kwanmuang	Phetchbuncha Stadium	Ko Samui, Thailand	Decision	5	3:00
2017-04-01	Win	(Japan) Genji Umeno	KNOCK OUT vol.2	Tokyo, Japan	Decision	5	3:00
2017-02-22	Win	(Thailand) Saeksan Or. Kwanmuang	Rajadamnern Stadium	Bangkok, Thailand	Decision	5	3:00
2016-12-09	Loss	(Thailand) Panpayak Jitmuangnon	Lumpinee Stadium	Bangkok, Thailand	Decision	5	3:00
2016-09-30	Loss	(Thailand) Kaimukkao Por.Thairongruangkamai	Lumpinee Stadium	Bangkok, Thailand	Decision	5	3:00
2016-08-05	Loss	(Thailand) Saeksan Or. Kwanmuang	Kiatpetch Show	Hat Yai, Thailand	Decision	5	3:00
2016-06-03	Win	(Thailand) Saeksan Or. Kwanmuang	Lumpinee Stadium	Bangkok, Thailand	Decision	5	3:00
2016-04-24	Win	(Thailand) Nuenglanlek Jitmuangnon	Channel 7 Boxing Stadium	Thailand	Decision	5	3:00
Wins the Channel 7 Boxing Stadium 130 lbs title
2016-03-02	Win	(Thailand) Nuenglanlek Jitmuangnon	Rajadamnern Stadium	Thailand	TKO	2	
2016-01-24	Win	(Thailand) Yodlekpet Or. Pitisak	Samui Festival	Ko Samui, Thailand	Decision	5	3:00
2015-11-10	Win	(Thailand) Panpayak Sitchefboontham	Lumpinee Stadium	Bangkok, Thailand	Decision	5	3:00
2015-09-04	Win	(Thailand) Pokaew Fonjangchonburi	Lumpinee Stadium	Bangkok, Thailand	Decision	5	3:00
2015-07-29	Win	(Thailand) Thaksinlek Kiatniwat	Rajadamnern Stadium	Bangkok, Thailand	Decision	5	3:00
2015-05-01	Loss	(Thailand) Yok Parunchai		Ko Samui, Thailand	Decision	5	3:00
2015-03-04	Win	(Thailand) Yokwitaya Phetsimean		Nakhon Si Thammarat, Thailand	Decision	5	3:00
2014-12-28	Win	(Thailand) GrandPrixnoi Phetkiatphet	Channel 7 Boxing Stadium	Bangkok, Thailand	Decision	5	3:00
2014-10-12	Win	(Thailand) Sirimongkol PK.Saenchaimuaythaigym	Channel 7 Boxing Stadium	Bangkok, Thailand	KO	3	
2014-09-05	Loss	(Thailand) Chalamtong Sitpanont	Lumpinee Stadium	Bangkok, Thailand	KO	3	
2014-08-10	Win	(Thailand) Saemapetch Fairtex	Channel 7 Boxing Stadium	Bangkok, Thailand	Decision	5	3:00
2014-05-09	Win	(Thailand) Saksuriya Sathit-CD		Nakhon Si Thammarat, Thailand	KO (Right Overhand)	2	
2014-02-13	Win	(Thailand) Jenarong Tor Thaksin		Nakhon Si Thammarat, Thailand	Decision	5	3:00
2013-09-22	Loss	(Thailand) Tsunami Jor.Chaiwat	Channel 7 Boxing Stadium	Bangkok, Thailand	Decision	5	3:00
2013-03-29	Loss	(Thailand) Yodbuangam S.B.P. Carnetwork	Channel 7 Boxing Stadium	Bangkok, Thailand	Decision	5	3:00
2012	Win	(Thailand) Pornsanae Sitmonchai		Thailand	KO (head kick)		
2012-09-23	Loss	(Thailand) Singphayak Mor.RajabhatChombueng	Channel 7 Boxing Stadium	Bangkok, Thailand	Decision	5	3:00
2012-03-25	Loss	(Thailand) Grandprixnoi Phitakpaphadaeng	Channel 7 Boxing Stadium	Bangkok, Thailand	Decision	5	3:00
2011	Win	(Thailand) Tuanpae Kiatkomsing	Lumpinee Stadium	Bangkok, Thailand	Decision	5	3:00
Wins WPMF World 126 lbs title
Legend: Win Loss Draw/No contest Notes
