= Nuenglanlek Jitmuangnon =

Thai Muay Thai fighter (born 1995)

- Born: December 28, 1995 (age 30); Kalasin, Thailand
- Height: 173 cm (5 ft 8 in)
- Division: Super Bantamweight
- Style: Muay Thai (Muay Khao)
- Stance: Orthodox
- Fighting out of: Bangkok, Thailand
- Team: Jitmuangnon/Yokkao
- Years active: 2013–present

Kickboxing record
- Total: 117
- Wins: 84
- Losses: 28
- Draws: 5

Nuenglanlek Jitmuangnon (Thai: หนึ่งล้านเล็ก) is a Thai Muay Thai fighter. He is the former interim Rajadamnern Stadium Welterweight Champion and former Lumpinee Stadium Super Featherweight Champion

== Muay Thai career ==
Nuenglanlek defeated Yodthongthai Sor.Sommai by unanimous decision in August 2016.

He fought Kulabdam Sor.Jor.Piek-U-Thai in May 2018 at the Lumpini Stadium. Nuenglanlek lost the fight by a unanimous decision.

Nuenglanlek lost a decision to Sangmanee Sor Tienpo in November 2018.

In December 2018 Nenglanked fought a rematch with Tawanchai PK Saenchaimuaythaigym at the Lumpini Stadium. Tawanchai won the fight by a fifth round TKO.

In February 2019 Nuenglanlek fought a rematch with Kulabdam Sor.Jor.Piek-U-Thai. He won the fight by a fourth round head kick KO.

He won a unanimous decision against Chujaroen Dabransarakarm in February 2020.

Nuenglanlek fought Tawanchai PK Saenchaimuaythaigym once again in August 2020. Tawanchai won the fight by a unanimous decision.

In November 2020, Nuenglanlek signed a 3-year sponsorship deal with Yokkao, becoming part of the Yokkao Fight Team.

== Titles and accomplishments ==
- Lumpinee Stadium
  - 2016 Lumpinee Stadium Super Featherweight (130 lbs) Champion
  - 2019 Lumpinee Stadium Fighter of the Year
  - 2019 Lumpinee Stadium Fight of the Year (vs Kulabdam Sor.Jor.Piek-U-Thai)
- Siam Omnoi Stadium
  - 2018 Omnoi Stadium Lightweight (135 lbs) Champion
- Rajadamnern Stadium
  - 2023 Rajadamnern World Series Welterweight (147 lbs) Runner-up
  - 2024 Interim Rajadamnern Stadium Welterweight (147 lbs) Champion

Awards

- 2019 Siam Kela Fighter of the Year
- 2019 Wan Muay Thai Awards Fighter of the Year
- 2019 Wan Muay Thai Awards Fight of the Year (vs Kulabdam Sor.Jor.Piek-U-Thai)

== Fight record ==
Muay Thai record
85 Wins, 31 Losses, 5 Draws
Date	Result	Opponent	Event	Location	Method	Round	Time
2026-05-30	Loss	(Russia) Kirill Khomutov	Rajadamnern World Series, Rajadamnern Stadium	Bangkok, Thailand	KO (Right cross)	1	2:58
2026-02-28	Loss	(Thailand) Khunhanlek Singhamawynn	Rajadamnern World Series	Bangkok, Thailand	Decision (Unanimous)	3	3:00
2025-12-12	Win	(Thailand) Chujaroen Dabransarakarm	Udon Sang Muay Thai Bai MuayLok	Udon Thani province, Thailand	Decision	5	3:00
2025-11-08	Loss	(Thailand) Khunhanlek Singhamawynn	Rajadamnern World Series	Bangkok, Thailand	Decision (Split)	3	3:00
2025-09-25	Loss	(Thailand) Capitan Petchyindee Academy	Petchyindee, Rajadamnern Stadium	Bangkok, Thailand	Decision (Unanimous)	5	3:00
For the vacant PRYDE TV Welterweight (147 lbs) title.
2025-08-09	Loss	(Thailand) Tapaokaew Singmawynn	Rajadamnern World Series	Bangkok, Thailand	Decision (Unanimous)	5	3:00
Unifying the Rajadamnern Stadium Welterweight (147 lbs) title.
2025-02-08	Win	(Thailand) Chujaroen Dabransarakarm	Rajadamnern World Series	Bangkok, Thailand	KO (Punches)	1	1:24
Defends the interim Rajadamnern Stadium Welterweight (147 lbs) title.
2024-10-12	Win	(Thailand) Capitan Petchyindee Academy	Rajadamnern World Series	Bangkok, Thailand	Decision (Unanimous)	5	3:00
Wins the interim Rajadamnern Stadium Welterweight (147 lbs) title.
2024-05-18	Win	(Thailand) Rungkit Bor.Rungrot	Rajadamnern World Series	Bangkok, Thailand	KO (Elbow)	1	3:00
2024-03-30	Win	(Iran) Vahid Nikkah	Rajadamnern World Series	Bangkok, Thailand	TKO	2	
2024-02-13	Win	(Thailand) Rangkhao Wor.Sangprapai	Muaymansananmuang Mahasarakham	Maha Sarakham province, Thailand	KO (Low kicks)	1	2:30
2023-09-30	Loss	(Thailand) Capitan Petchyindee Academy	Rajadamnern World Series - Final	Bangkok, Thailand	Decision (Unanimous)	5	3:00
2023 Rajadamnern World Series Super Lightweight (140 lbs) Final
2023-08-19	Win	(Thailand) Petchthongchai T.B.M Gym	Rajadamnern World Series - Final 4	Bangkok, Thailand	Decision (Unanimous)	3	3:00
2023-07-15	Win	(Thailand) Pinpetch Banchamek	Rajadamnern World Series - Group Stage	Bangkok, Thailand	Decision (Unanimous)	3	3:00
2023-06-10	Loss	(Thailand) Chujaroen Dabransarakarm	Rajadamnern World Series - Group Stage	Bangkok, Thailand	Decision (Unanimous)	3	3:00
2023-05-06	Win	(France) Mathias Phountoucos	Rajadamnern World Series - Group Stage	Bangkok, Thailand	Decision (Unanimous)	3	3:00
2023-03-11	Loss	(Thailand) Capitan Petchyindee Academy	RWS + Petchyindee, Rajadamnern Stadium	Bangkok, Thailand	Decision (Unanimous)	3	3:00
2023-02-11	Win	(Uganda) Award ChokdeeGym	Rajadamnern World Series + Petchyindee	Bangkok, Thailand	Decision (unanimous)	3	3:00
2022-12-16	Loss	(Russia) Elbrus VenumMuayThai	Rajadamnern World Series	Bangkok, Thailand	KO (Spinning back elbow)	3	0:48
2022-05-12	Win	(Thailand) Chujaroen Dabransarakarm	Petchyindee, Rajadamnern Stadium	Bangkok, Thailand	Decision	5	3:00
2022-03-03	Win	(Thailand) Chamuaktong Fightermuaythai	Petchyindee, Rajadamnern Stadium	Bangkok, Thailand	Decision	5	3:00
2021-11-16	Loss	(Thailand) Ferrari Fairtex	Lumpinee GoSport + Kiatpetch, Lumpinee Stadium	Bangkok, Thailand	Decision	5	3:00
2021-03-26	Draw	(Thailand) Capitan PetchyindeeAcademy	Muaymumwansuk True4u, Rangsit Stadium	Rangsit, Thailand	Decision	5	3:00
2020-12-18	Win	(Thailand) Tapaokaew Singmawynn	Suk Singmawin	Songkhla, Thailand	TKO (Doctor stoppage/cut)	3	
2020-10-09	Loss	(Thailand) Chujaroen Dabransarakarm	True4U Muaymanwansuk, Rangsit Stadium	Rangsit, Thailand	Decision	5	3:00
2020-08-16	Loss	(Thailand) Tawanchai PK Saenchaimuaythaigym	Channel 7 Boxing Stadium	Bangkok, Thailand	Decision	5	3:00
2020-02-09	Win	(Thailand) Chujaroen Dabransarakarm	Srithammaracha + Kiatpetch Super Fight	Nakhon Si Thammarat, Thailand	Decision	5	3:00
2019-12-23	Win	(Thailand) Yodlekpet Or. Pitisak	Rajadamnern Stadium	Bangkok, Thailand	Decision (Unanimous)	5	3:00
2019-11-07	Win	(Thailand) Muangthai PKSaenchaimuaythaigym	Ruamponkon Prachin	Prachinburi, Thailand	KO (Elbow)	4	
2019-10-05	Win	(Thailand) Kulabdam Sor.Jor.Piek-U-Thai	Yod Muay Thai Naikhanomton	Buriram, Thailand	TKO (Knees to the body)	4	
2019-07-04	Win	(Thailand) Yodlekpet Or. Pitisak	Rajadamnern Stadium	Bangkok, Thailand	Decision (Unanimous)	5	3:00
2019-05-10	Loss	(Thailand) Kulabdam Sor.Jor.Piek-U-Thai	Lumpinee Stadium	Bangkok, Thailand	Decision	5	3:00
2019-03-27	Win	(Thailand) Muangthai PKSaenchaimuaythaigym	Parunchai Birthday	Thung Song, Thailand	KO (Elbow)	2	
2019-02-12	Win	(Thailand) Kulabdam Sor.Jor.Piek-U-Thai	Lumpinee Stadium	Bangkok, Thailand	KO (Right high kick)	4	
2018-12-07	Loss	(Thailand) Tawanchai PK Saenchaimuaythaigym	Lumpinee Stadium	Bangkok, Thailand	TKO	5	0:40
2018-11-08	Loss	(Thailand) Sangmanee Sor Tienpo	Rajadamnern Stadium	Bangkok, Thailand	Decision	5	3:00
2018-09-06	Win	(Thailand) Panpayak Sitchefboontham	Rajadamnern Stadium	Bangkok, Thailand	Decision	5	3:00
2018-07-10	Loss	(Thailand) Tawanchai PK Saenchaimuaythaigym	Lumpinee Stadium	Bangkok, Thailand	Decision	5	3:00
2018-06-16	Win	(Thailand) Extra Sitworapat	Siam Omnoi Stadium	Bangkok, Thailand	Decision	5	3:00
Defended the Siam Omnoi Stadium Lightweight (135 lbs) title.
2018-05-01	Loss	(Thailand) Kulabdam Sor.Jor.Piek-U-Thai	Lumpinee Stadium	Bangkok, Thailand	Decision	5	3:00
2018-03-17	Win	(Thailand) Kaimukkao Por.Thairongruangkamai	Siam Omnoi Stadium	Bangkok, Thailand	KO	3	
Wins the Siam Omnoi Stadium Lightweight (135 lbs) title.
2018-02-08	Loss	(Thailand) Kaimukkao Por.Thairongruangkamai		Thailand	Decision	5	3:00
2017-12-29	Win	(Thailand) Rodlek Jaotalaytong	Suk Jaotalaythong+Piyuphabaimahakosol	Surat Thani Province, Thailand	Decision	5	3:00
2017-11-09	Win	(Thailand) Kaimukkao Por.Thairongruangkamai	Rajadamnern Stadium	Bangkok, Thailand	Decision	5	3:00
2017-09-09	Loss	(Thailand) Phet Utong Or. Kwanmuang		Thailand	TKO	4	
2017-07-31	Win	(Thailand) Extra Sor.Sirilak	Rajadamnern Stadium	Bangkok, Thailand	Decision	5	3:00
2017-06-27	Win	(Thailand) Petnamngam Or.Kwanmuang	Rajadamnern Stadium	Bangkok, Thailand	Decision	5	3:00
2017-05-31	Win	(Thailand) Design Rachanon	Rajadamnern Stadium	Bangkok, Thailand	TKO	4	
2017-05-02	Draw	(Thailand) Sakchainoi M.U.Den		Mueang Krabi District, Thailand	Decision	5	3:00
2017-03-29	Loss	(Thailand) Extra Sor.Sirilak	Rajadamnern Stadium	Bangkok, Thailand	Decision	5	3:00
2017-03-07	Loss	(Thailand) Phetmorakot Teeded99	Rajadamnern Stadium	Bangkok, Thailand	KO (High Kick)		
2017-01-26	Loss	(Thailand) Petnamngam Or.Kwanmuang	Rajadamnern Stadium	Bangkok, Thailand	Decision	5	3:00
2016-12-09	Loss	(Thailand) Phetmorakot Teeded99	Lumpinee Stadium	Bangkok, Thailand	Decision	5	3:00
Loses the Lumpinee Stadium Super Featherweight (130 lbs) title.
2016-10-04	Loss	(Thailand) Kaonar P.K.SaenchaiMuaythaiGym	Lumpinee Stadium	Bangkok, Thailand	Decision	5	3:00
2016-08-30	Win	(Thailand) Yodthongthai Sor.Sommai		Songkhla Province, Thailand	Decision	5	3:00
2016-08-05	Win	(Thailand) Jamsak Sakburirum	Lumpinee Stadium	Bangkok, Thailand	Decision	5	3:00
Wins the Lumpinee Stadium Super Featherweight (130 lbs) title.
2016-06-24	Loss	(Thailand) Saen Parunchai	Central Stadium	Songkhla, Thailand	Decision	5	3:00
2016-06-02	Win	(Thailand) Kongdanai Sor.Sommai	Rajadamnern Stadium	Bangkok, Thailand	Decision	5	3:00
2016-04-24	Loss	(Thailand) Rodlek Jaotalaytong	Channel 7 Boxing Stadium	Thailand	Decision	5	3:00
For the Channel 7 Boxing Stadium Super Featherweight (130 lbs) title.
2016-03-02	Loss	(Thailand) Rodlek Jaotalaytong	Rajadamnern Stadium	Thailand	TKO	2	
2016-01-29	Win	(Thailand) Grandprixnoi Pitakpaphadeang	Lumpinee Stadium	Thailand	Decision	5	3:00
2015-11-10	Draw	(Thailand) Grandprixnoi Pitakpaphadeang	Rajadamnern Stadium	Bangkok, Thailand	Decision	5	3:00
2015-10-13	Win	(Thailand) Yok Parunchai	Lumpinee Stadium	Bangkok, Thailand	Decision	5	3:00
2015-09-20	Loss	(Thailand) Yok Parunchai	Channel 7 Boxing Stadium	Bangkok, Thailand	Decision	5	3:00
2015-08-24	Win	(Thailand) Yimsiam Pangkongprab		Nakhon Si Thammarat, Thailand	Decision	5	3:00
2015-05-31	Win	(Thailand) Sirimongkol PK Saenchaimuaythaigym	Rajadamnern Stadium	Bangkok, Thailand	Decision	5	3:00
2015-04-27	Win	(Thailand) Fasatan Sitwatcharachai	Rangsit Boxing Stadium	Rangsit, Thailand	Decision	5	3:00
2015-02-15	Win	(Thailand) Kaow-A Kiatcharoenchai	Channel 7 Boxing Stadium	Bangkok, Thailand	TKO	4	
2014-12-11	Win	(Thailand) Phalaphon Pumphanmuang	Lumpinee Stadium	Bangkok, Thailand	KO	2	
2014-10-12	Win	(Thailand) Kaow-A Sitpholek	Channel 7 Boxing Stadium	Bangkok, Thailand	Decision	5	3:00
2013-11-23	Win	(Thailand) Posailek Pagonponsurin	Ladprao Stadium	Bangkok, Thailand	KO (Elbow)		
2013-	Win	(Spain) Isaac Araya		Bangkok, Thailand	Decision	5	3:00
Legend: Win Loss Draw/No contest Notes

== See also ==
- List of male kickboxers
