= Petchmahachon Jitmuangnon =

American Muay Thai fighter

- Born: Thiwa Phunatha; 30 January 1991 (age 35); Yang Talat District, Kalasin Province, Thailand
- Other names: Petchmahachon Thairungruang
- Nationality: Thai
- Height: 168 cm (5 ft 6 in)
- Weight: 63 kg (139 lb; 9.9 st)
- Division: Super lightweight
- Style: Muay Matt
- Stance: Orthodox
- Fighting out of: Nonthaburi, Thailand

Petchmahachon Jitmuangnon (เพชรมหาชน จิตรเมืองนนท์) is a Thai Muay Thai fighter. He currently trains and fights out of the famous Jitmuangnon Gym in Nonthaburi, training alongside teammates such as Rodtang and Sakaengam Jitmuangnon. As of November 2021, Petchmahachon is ranked tenth at Super lightweight by the World Muay Thai Organization (WMO), and first by the WBC Muay Thai. He was nominated for the 2021 Sports Writers Association of Thailand Fighter of the Year award.

== Titles and accomplishments ==
Siam Omnoi Stadium

- 2018 Siam Omnoi Stadium 135 lbs Champion
- 29th Isuzu Cup tournament Champion

== Fight record ==
Muay Thai Record
| Date | Result | Opponent | Event | Location | Method | Round | Time |
|---|---|---|---|---|---|---|---|
| 2022-04-16 | Loss | (Thailand) Patakthep Pakbangkakaw | Sor.Sommai + Pitaktham | Phayao province, Thailand | Decision | 5 | 3:00 |
| 2022-03-11 | Loss | (Thailand) Saeksan Or. Kwanmuang | Pitaktham + Sor.Sommai + Palangmai | Songkhla province, Thailand | Decision | 5 | 3:00 |
| 2021-09-18 | Win | (Thailand) Yodlekpet Or.Pitisak | Siam Omnoi Stadium | Samut Sakhon, Thailand | Decision | 5 | 3:00 |
| 2021-04-02 | Win | (Thailand) Saeksan Or.Kwanmuang | Lumpinee Stadium | Bangkok, Thailand | Decision | 5 | 3:00 |
| 2020-11-26 | Win | (Thailand) Yodphupha Tor.Nontong | Jitmuangnon Stadium | Nonthaburi, Thailand | Decision | 5 | 3:00 |
| 2020-10-25 | Win | (Thailand) Rambolek Tor.Yotha | Muaydeevitheethai, Blue Arena | Samut Prakan, Thailand | Decision | 5 | 3:00 |
| 2020-09-20 | Win | (Thailand) Kom-Awut F.A.Group | Muaydeevitheethai, Blue Arena | Samut Prakan, Thailand | Decision | 5 | 3:00 |
| 2020-08-09 | Win | (Thailand) Phadetsuk Kor.Kampanat | Muaydeevitheethai, Blue Arena | Samut Prakan, Thailand | Decision | 5 | 3:00 |
| 2019-12-21 | Win | (Thailand) Saencherngnoi Sitnayok-Sanya | Siam Omnoi Stadium | Samut Sakhon, Thailand | KO | 4 | |
| 2019-11-25 | Loss | (Thailand) Jaruadsuk Kor.Kampanat | Rajadamnern Stadium | Bangkok, Thailand | Decision | 5 | 3:00 |
| 2019-07-27 | Loss | (Iran) Amir (Naseri) Tigermuaythai | Siam Omnoi Stadium | Samut Sakhon, Thailand | Decision | 5 | 3:00 |
For the Siam Omnoi Stadium 140 lbs title
| 2019-03-09 | Win | (Thailand) Ploywitthaya Phetsimuen | 29th Isuzu Cup final, Siam Omnoi Stadium | Samut Sakhon, Thailand | Decision | 5 | 3:00 |
For the 29th annual Isuzu Cup tournament title
| 2019-01-19 | Win | (Thailand) Palapon Aor.Bor.Jor.Udon | 29th Isuzu Cup semi-final, Siam Omnoi Stadium | Samut Sakhon, Thailand | Decision | 5 | 3:00 |
| 2018-11-17 | Win | (Thailand) Phetsinin Sitboonmee | 29th Isuzu Cup group stage, Siam Omnoi Stadium | Samut Sakhon, Thailand | Decision | 5 | 3:00 |
| 2018-10-06 | Win | (Thailand) Ploywitthaya Phetsimuen | 29th Isuzu Cup group stage, Siam Omnoi Stadium | Samut Sakhon, Thailand | Decision | 5 | 3:00 |
| 2018-09-08 | Win | (Thailand) Sumai Phetkasem | 29th Isuzu Cup group stage, Siam Omnoi Stadium | Samut Sakhon, Thailand | Decision | 5 | 3:00 |
| 2018-08-04 | Win | (Thailand) Chalamsuk Nitsamui | Siam Omnoi Stadium | Samut Sakhon, Thailand | Decision | 5 | 3:00 |
For the Siam Omnoi Stadium 135 lbs title
| 2018-03-26 | Loss | (Thailand) Ongbak Himalayagym | Rajadamnern Stadium | Bangkok, Thailand | Decision | 5 | 3:00 |
| 2018-01-27 | Win | (Thailand) Payator Or.Kwanmuang | Siam Omnoi Stadium | Samut Sakhon, Thailand | Decision | 5 | 3:00 |
| 2017-12-30 | Draw | (Thailand) Chalamsuk Sor.Kor.Wanitsangrod | Siam Omnoi Stadium | Samut Sakhon, Thailand | Decision | 5 | 3:00 |
| 2017-12-09 | Win | (Thailand) Samingyok Lukmichumpon | Siam Omnoi Stadium | Samut Sakhon, Thailand | KO (leg kicks) | 5 | |
| 2017-11-04 | Loss | (Thailand) Sumai Phetkasem | Siam Omnoi Stadium | Samut Sakhon, Thailand | Decision | 5 | 3:00 |
| 2017-08-06 | Loss | (Thailand) Petchsamui Lukjaoporrongtom | Muaydeevitheethai, Rangsit Stadium | Rangsit, Thailand | Decision | 5 | 3:00 |
| 2017-06-23 | Win | (Thailand) Petchsamui Lukjaoporrongtom | Upcountry | Thailand | Decision | 5 | 3:00 |
| 2017-05-27 | Win | (Thailand) Palapon Pumpanmuang | Siam Omnoi Stadium | Samut Sakhon, Thailand | Decision | 5 | 3:00 |
| 2017-04-05 | Loss | (Thailand) Kulabdam Sor.Jor.Piek-U-Thai | Upcountry | Thailand | Decision | 5 | 3:00 |
| 2017-03-19 | Loss | (Thailand) Patakthep Pakbangkakhao | Upcountry | Thailand | KO | 3 | |
| 2017-02-18 | Loss | (Thailand) Palapon Pumpanmuang | Siam Omnoi Stadium | Samut Sakhon, Thailand | Decision | 5 | 3:00 |
| 2017-01-15 | Win | (Thailand) Diesellek M.U.Den | Jitmuangnon Stadium | Nonthaburi, Thailand | Decision | 5 | 3:00 |
| 2016-12-24 | Win | (Thailand) Ritaiyara Klalukmuangphet | Siam Omnoi Stadium | Samut Sakhon, Thailand | Decision | 5 | 3:00 |
| 2016-11-15 | Win | (Thailand) Neuasila Tor.Niyomsuk | Upcountry | Thailand | Decision | 5 | 3:00 |
| 2016-09-04 | Win | (Thailand) Narongnoi Lukmakhamwan | Jitmuangnon Stadium | Nonthaburi, Thailand | Decision | 5 | 3:00 |
| 2016-07-23 | Win | (Thailand) Darky Lukmakhamwan | Lumpinee Stadium | Bangkok, Thailand | Decision | 5 | 3:00 |
| 2016-06-26 | Win | (Thailand) Rungrawee Nayok-A-Thasala | Upcountry | Thailand | Decision | 5 | 3:00 |
| 2016-04-22 | Win | (Thailand) Diesellek M.U.Den | Upcountry | Thailand | Decision | 5 | 3:00 |
| 2016-04-04 | Win | (Thailand) Neuasila Tor.Niyomsuk | Upcountry | Thailand | Decision | 5 | 3:00 |
| 2016-03-28 | Win | (Thailand) Rungrawee Nayok-A-Thasala | Suk Kiatpetch Channel 7 | Nakhon Si Thammarat, Thailand | Decision | 5 | 3:00 |
| 2015-12-27 | Loss | (Thailand) Rungrawee Nayok-A-Thasala | Jitmuangnon Stadium | Nonthaburi, Thailand | Decision | 5 | 3:00 |
| 2015-11-01 | Loss | (Thailand) Srimongkol P.K.Saenchaimuaythaigym | Rajadamnern Stadium | Bangkok, Thailand | KO (elbow) | 4 | |
| 2015-08-02 | Win | (Thailand) Mapralong Sor.Boonyongyot | Rajadamnern Stadium | Bangkok, Thailand | Decision | 5 | 3:00 |
| 2014-11-28 | Win | (Thailand) Chatchai Sitpanon | World Boxing Expo, Suk M-150 | Bangkok, Thailand | Decision | 5 | 3:00 |

Legend: Win Loss Draw/No contest
