= Saemapetch Fairtex =

Thai Muay Thai kickboxer

- Born: September 10, 1994 (age 32); Doi Saket District, Chiang Mai Province, Thailand
- Other names: Saemapetch Sor.Chaowalit (เสมาเพชร ส.เชาวลิต)
- Height: 171 cm (5 ft 7 1/2 in)
- Weight: 65.5 kg (144 lb; 10.31 st)
- Reach: 71 in (180 cm)
- Style: Muay Thai
- Stance: Southpaw
- Fighting out of: Bangkok, Thailand
- Team: Fairtex; Singklongski (former)

Kickboxing record
- Total: 152
- Wins: 127
- Losses: 24
- Draws: 1

Saemapetch Fairtex (Thai: เสมาเพชร แฟร์เท็กซ์; born September 10, 1994) is a Thai Muay Thai kickboxer who is currently signed to ONE Championship.

== Titles and accomplishments ==
=== Muay Thai ===
- Channel 7 Stadium
  - 2012 Channel 7 Tiger Cement Tournament Champion
- Muay Thai Grand Prix
  - 2018 MTGP World Welterweight Champion

=== Amateur Boxing ===
- 2017 Thai Army Boxing -63 kg Champion

=== Awards ===
- ONE Championship
  - Performance of the Night (Three times) vs. Rittewada Petchyindee, Kaonar P.K. Saenchai, and Mohamed Younes Rabah

== Fight record ==
Muay Thai Record
127 Wins, 24 Losses, 1 Draw
Date	Result	Opponent	Event	Location	Method	Round	Time
2025-09-19	Loss	(Russia) Elbrus Osmanov	ONE Friday Fights 125	Bangkok, Thailand	Decision (Unanimous)	3	3:00
2025-05-03	Loss	(Russia) Abdulla Dayakaev	ONE Fight Night 31	Bangkok, Thailand	TKO (knee and punches)	2	1:44
2025-02-08	Loss	(Brazil) Felipe Lobo	ONE Fight Night 28	Bangkok, Thailand	TKO (Punches)	3	2:22
2024-07-05	Loss	(Scotland) Nico Carrillo	ONE Fight Night 23	Bangkok, Thailand	TKO (3 Knockdowns)	2	2:03
2024-02-17	Win	(Algeria) Mohamed Younes Rabah	ONE Fight Night 19	Bangkok, Thailand	TKO (Three Knockdowns)	1	1:33
2023-12-09	Loss	(Algeria) Mohamed Younes Rabah	ONE Fight Night 17	Bangkok, Thailand	TKO (Punches)	1	2:29
2023-08-25	Win	(Thailand) Kaonar Sor.Jor.Tongprajin	ONE Friday Fights 30	Bangkok, Thailand	KO (Punches)	1	2:09
2023-04-22	Loss	(Brazil) Felipe Lobo	ONE Fight Night 9	Bangkok, Thailand	KO (Punches)	3	1:56
2023-02-24	Win	(China) Zhang Chenglong	ONE Fight Night 7	Bangkok, Thailand	Decision (Unanimous)	3	3:00
2022-08-26	Win	(Thailand) Rittewada Petchyindee Academy	ONE 160	Kallang, Singapore	KO (Left cross)	2	1:36
2022-01-14	Loss	(Thailand) Tawanchai P.K. Saenchaimuaythaigym	ONE: Heavy Hitters	Singapore	KO (Left Cross)	1	2:55
2021-11-12	Loss	(Thailand) Rittewada Petchyindee Academy	ONE Championship: NextGen II	Singapore	TKO (Doctor Stop./Left elbow)	2	2:10
2021-04-28	Win	(Thailand) Kulabdam Sor.Jor.Piek-U-Thai	ONE Championship: Full Blast	Singapore	KO (Straight to the body)	1	2:12
2020-11-29	Win	(Thailand) Pongsiri P.K.Saenchaimuaythaigym	Channel 7 Boxing Stadium	Bangkok, Thailand	KO (Left elbow)	3	0:56
2020-08-14	Win	(Thailand) Rodlek P.K. Saenchaimuaythaigym	ONE Championship: No Surrender 2	Bangkok, Thailand	Decision (Majority)	3	3:00
2019-11-22	Loss	(Thailand) Nong-O Gaiyanghadao	ONE Championship: Edge Of Greatness	Kallang, Singapore	KO (Right cross)	4	1:46
For the ONE Bantamweight Muay Thai World Title
2019-04-12	Win	(Serbia) Ognjen Topic	ONE Championship: Roots of Honor	Pasay, Philippines	Decision (Majority)	3	3:00
2019-03-02	Loss	(Australia) Tyler Hardcastle	Rebellion Muaythai 21	Australia	Decision	5	3:00
2018-11-23	Win	(Russia) Alaverdi Ramazanov	ONE Championship: Conquest of Champions	Pasay, Philippines	Decision (Unanimous)	3	3:00
2018-08-18	Win	(Australia) Jordan Godtfredsen	Rebellion Muaythai 20	Australia	Decision	5	3:00
2018-07-07	Win	(Lithuania) Deividas Danyla	ONE Championship: Battle for the Heavens	Guangzhou, China	Decision (Unanimous)	3	3:00
2018-05-05	Win	(Spain) Nauzet Trujillo	Enfusion	Spain	Decision (Split)	3	3:00
2018-04-07	Win	(United Kingdom) Charlie Peters	MTGP Presents Lion Fight 41	London, England	KO (Elbow)	4	1:30
Wins Muay Thai Grand Prix Welterweight World Title
2018-02-10	Win	(Thailand) Navi J-Powerroofpuket	Lumpinee Stadium	Bangkok, Thailand	KO (Straight Left)	3	
2017-11-24	Loss	(Thailand) Singpayak Chombueng	Rebellion Muaythai 17	Australia	Decision	3	3:00
For the Rebellion 65 kg Tournament title.
2017-11-24	Win	(Thailand) Apisit Ktgym	Rebellion Muaythai 17 – 65 kg Tournament Semi Final	Australia	Decision	3	3:00
2017-11-24	Win	(Australia) Alexi Petroulias	Rebellion Muaythai 17 – 65 kg Tournament Quarter Final	Australia	Decision	3	3:00
2017-09-30	Win	(Brazil) Maycon Oller	All Star Fight 2	Bangkok, Thailand	TKO		
2017-05-20	Win	(Slovakia) Jozef Janotik	Ministry of Fight	Slovakia			
2017-04-30	Loss	(China) Gu Hui	Kunlun Fight 60	Guizhou, China	Decision	3	3:00
2016-05-29	Win	(Thailand) Pinphet Sitjedaeng	Channel 7 Boxing Stadium	Bangkok, Thailand	Decision	5	3:00
2016-04-24	Loss	(Thailand) Inseetong Por.Pinnapat	Channel 7 Boxing Stadium	Bangkok, Thailand	Decision	5	3:00
2015-08-24	Win	(Thailand) Rungkiat Eminent Air		Nakhon Si Thammarat, Thailand	Decision	5	3:00
2015-07-26	Loss	(Thailand) Starboy Petchkiatchpetch	Channel 7 Boxing Stadium	Bangkok, Thailand	Decision	5	3:00
2015-07-04	Win	(Thailand) Chalamtong Sitpanon		Lampang, Thailand	Decision	5	3:00
2015-05-24	Win	(Thailand) Patakthep Sinbeemuaythai	Channel 7 Boxing Stadium	Bangkok, Thailand	Decision	5	3:00
2015-04-28	Win	(Thailand) Nawaphol Sitthiphon		Roi Et, Thailand	KO (Low Kicks)	4	
2014-11-30	Loss	(Thailand) Rungkiat Eminent Air	Channel 7 Boxing Stadium	Bangkok, Thailand	Decision	5	3:00
2014-08-10	Loss	(Thailand) Rodlek P.K. Saenchaimuaythaigym	Channel 7 Boxing Stadium	Bangkok, Thailand	Decision	5	3:00
2014-05-11	Loss	(Thailand) Chalamtong Sitpanon	Channel 7 Boxing Stadium	Bangkok, Thailand	KO (Left Hook)	2	
2014-02-01	Win	(Thailand) Yodbuangam Sor.Chokkitchai	Channel 7 Boxing Stadium	Bangkok, Thailand	Decision	5	3:00
2013-09-15	Loss	(Thailand) Nawaphol Sitthiphon	Channel 7 Boxing Stadium	Bangkok, Thailand	Decision	5	3:00
2013-07-14	Loss	(Thailand) Padsenlek Rachanon	Channel 7 Boxing Stadium	Bangkok, Thailand	Decision	5	3:00
2013-04-07	Win	(Thailand) Khunsap Suwitgym	Channel 7 Boxing Stadium	Bangkok, Thailand	Decision	5	3:00
2013-01-06	Loss	(Thailand) Chennarong Tor.Thaksin	Channel 7 Boxing Stadium	Bangkok, Thailand	Decision	5	3:00
2012-10-21	Loss	(Thailand) Rungsiangtawan Sitnayoksirichai	Channel 7 Boxing Stadium	Bangkok, Thailand	Decision	5	3:00
2012-06-17	Win	(Thailand) Mafeuangnoi Chor Rongsoorang	Channel 7 Boxing Stadium	Bangkok, Thailand	Decision	5	3:00
Wins 12th Tiger Cement Tournament.
2011-11-13	Win	(Thailand) Ritichai Sor Sakoncheua	Channel 7 Boxing Stadium	Bangkok, Thailand	Decision	5	3:00
Legend: Win Loss Draw/No contest Notes

1. Samaapetch Fairtex
