= Ratchasiesan Laochokcharoen =

Thai professional Muay Thai fighter and boxer

Kulabdam Sor Jor Piek-U-Thai
- Born: Somboon Meesitdee; September 24, 1998 (age 28); Surin province, Thailand
- Native name: สมบูรณ์ มีสิทธิ์ดี
- Other names: Ratchasiesan Laochokcharoen
- Nickname: Left Meteorite (ซ้ายอุกกาบาต); Executioner (เพชฌฆาต)
- Height: 170 cm (5 ft 7 in)
- Division: Lightweight; Super Lightweight
- Style: Muay Thai (Muay Mat)
- Stance: Southpaw
- Fighting out of: Bangkok, Thailand
- Team: Sor Jor Piek-U-Thai

Kickboxing record
- Total: 112
- Wins: 82
- Losses: 28
- Draws: 2

Other information
- Boxing record from BoxRec

Somboon Meesitdee (Thai: สมบูรณ์ มีสิทธิ์ดี; born September 24, 1998), known professionally as Ratchasiesan Laochokcharoen (Thai: ราชสีห์อีสาน เหล่าโชคเจริญ), formerly Kulabdam Sor.Jor.Piek-U-Thai (Thai: กุหลาบดำ ส.จ.เปี๊ยกอุทัย), is a Thai professional Muay Thai fighter and boxer.

== Biography ==
In 2016 Kulabdam became very popular at the Channel 7 Stadium with a streak of knockouts.

For his results during the year 2017 he received the most prestigious distinction in muay thai the Sports Writers Association Fighter of the Year Award.

In February 2018 he won the Lumpinee 135lbs title against Genji Umeno in Tokyo.

=== ONE Championship ===
In September 2019, Kulabadam made his debut for ONE Championship at ONE Championship: Immortal Triumph. He scored a knockdown in the first round and won a unanimous decision against Bobo Sacko in Ho Chi Minh City, Vietnam.

He faced Sangmanee Sor Tienpo on August 21, 2020 in the ONE Bantamweight Muay Thai Tournament Semi-Final. Kulabdam knocked out Sangmanee in the first round to advance to the Tournament Final, where was set to face Saemapetch Fairtex. Soon after, it was announced that Saemapetch was injured and Kulabdam would face Rodlek P.K. Saenchaimuaythaigym in the Final.

On August 28, 2020, Kulabdam was dominated in the ONE Bantamweight Muay Thai Tournament Final, getting knocked down twice, and lost by unanimous decision to Rodlek.

On December 8, 2020 Kulabdam faced Shadow Thor.Thepsutin at the Lumpinee Stadium Birthday show. He won the fight by knockout in the second round.

Kulabdam faced Saemapetch Fairtex on May 28, 2021 at ONE Championship: Full Blast. He lost by first-round knockout via punch to the body.

Kulabdam faced Sangmanee P.K.Saenchai on January 27, 2023, at ONE Lumpinee 2. He won the fight via unanimous decision.

Kulabdam faced Muangthai P.K.Saenchai on March 17, 2023, at ONE Friday Fights 9. He lost the fight via knockout in the third round.

Kulabdam faced John Lineker on January 11, 2025, at ONE Fight Night 27. At the weigh-ins, both fighters failed multiple hydration tests and the bout proceeded at a catchweight of 150.75 pounds. He won the fight via unanimous decision.

== Personal life ==
Kulabdam has a younger brother who is also a fighter named Tai Sor-Jor Piekuthai.

== Titles and accomplishments ==
- ONE Championship
  - 2020 ONE Bantamweight Muay Thai Tournament runner-up
- Lumpinee Stadium
  - 2018 Lumpinee Stadium Lightweight (135 lbs) Champion
  - 2018 Lumpinee Stadium Fight of the Year (June 5 vs Muangthai PKSaenchaimuaythaigym)
  - 2019 Lumpinee Stadium Super Lightweight (140 lbs) Champion
  - 2019 Lumpinee Stadium Fight of the Year (May 10 vs Nuenglanlek Jitmuangnon)
- Professional Boxing Association of Thailand (PAT)
  - 2017 Thailand Lightweight (135lbs) Champion

Awards

- 2017 Sports Writers Association of Thailand Fighter of the Year

== Fight record ==
Muay Thai record
82 Wins, 29 Losses, 2 Draw, 1 No Contest
Date	Result	Opponent	Event	Location	Method	Round	Time
2026-05-01	Loss	(Russia) Elbrus Omsanov	ONE Friday Fights 152, Lumpinee Stadium	Bangkok, Thailand	TKO (3 Knockdowns)	1	2:18
2026-03-20	Win	(Uzbekistan) Uzair Ismoiljonov	ONE Friday Fights 147, Lumpinee Stadium	Bangkok, Thailand	KO (Body kick)	3	2:22
2025-12-19	Loss	(Thailand) PTT ApichartFarm	ONE Friday Fights 137, Lumpinee Stadium	Bangkok, Thailand	Decision (Majority)	3	3:00
2025-09-05	Win	(Brazil) Felipe Lobo	ONE Friday Fights 123, Lumpinee Stadium	Bangkok, Thailand	Decision (Unanimous)	3	3:00
2025-04-04	Win	(Turkey) Ferzan Cicek	ONE Friday Fights 103, Lumpinee Stadium	Bangkok, Thailand	KO (Left cross)	1	2:11
2025-01-11	Win	(Brazil) John Lineker	ONE Fight Night 27	Bangkok, Thailand	Decision (Unanimous)	3	3:00
2024-09-27	Win	(Thailand) Suablack Tor.Pran49	ONE Friday Fights 81, Lumpinee Stadium	Bangkok, Thailand	KO (Left cross)	3	0:57
2024-07-05	Loss	(Thailand) Nabil Anane	ONE Friday Fights 69, Lumpinee Stadium	Bangkok, Thailand	KO (Knee to the head)	2	2:54
2024-04-05	Loss	(Thailand) Nong-O Gaiyanghadao	ONE Friday Fights 58, Lumpinee Stadium	Bangkok, Thailand	Decision (Unanimous)	3	3:00
2024-02-16	Win	(Brazil) Julio Lobo	ONE Friday Fights 52, Lumpinee Stadium	Bangkok, Thailand	TKO (3 Knockdowns)	1	2:36
2023-12-22	Win	(Iran) Fariyar Aminipour	ONE Friday Fights 46, Lumpinee Stadium	Bangkok, Thailand	KO (Left hook to the body)	1	2:51
2023-09-22	Win	(Australia) Tyson Harrison	ONE Friday Fights 34, Lumpinee Stadium	Bangkok, Thailand	TKO (Doctor stoppage)	1	3:00
2023-07-21	NC	(France) Rafi Bohic	ONE Friday Fights 26, Lumpinee Stadium	Bangkok, Thailand	Doctor stoppage (eye poke)	1	
2023-06-02	Win	(Russia) Ilyas Musaev	ONE Friday Fights 19, Lumpinee Stadium	Bangkok, Thailand	Decision (Unanimous)	3	3:00
2023-03-17	Loss	(Thailand) Muangthai PKSaenchaimuaythaigym	ONE Friday Fights 9, Lumpinee Stadium	Bangkok, Thailand	KO (Elbow)	3	1:37
2023-01-27	Win	(Thailand) Sangmanee Sor Tienpo	ONE Lumpinee 2	Bangkok, Thailand	Decision (Unanimous)	3	3:00
2022-10-01	Loss	(Thailand) Yodlekpet Or.Achariya	Muay Thai Vithee TinThai + Kiatpetch	Buriram province, Thailand	Decision	5	3:00
2022-08-13	Loss	(Thailand) Rambolek Tor.Yotha	Ruamponkon Samui, Petchbuncha Stadium	Ko Samui, Thailand	Decision	5	3:00
2022-06-20	Win	(Thailand) Kongklai AnnyMuayThai	U-Muay RuamJaiKonRakMuayThai + Palangmai, Rajadamnern Stadium	Bangkok, Thailand	Decision	5	3:00
2022-05-09	Win	(Thailand) Siwagorn Kiatjaroenchai	Satun Super Fight	Satun province, Thailand	Decision	5	3:00
2022-04-16	Loss	(Thailand) Petchmanee Por.Lakboon	Sor.Sommai + Pitaktham	Phayao province, Thailand	Decision	5	3:00
2021-11-26	Loss	(Thailand) Yodlekpet Or.Achariya	Muaythai Moradok Kon Thai + Rajadamnern Super Fight	Buriram, Thailand	Decision	5	3:00
For the vacant Rajadamnern Stadium Super Lightweight (140 lbs) title.
2021-10-03	Win	(Thailand) Saeksan Or. Kwanmuang	Channel 7 Stadium	Bangkok, Thailand	Decision	5	3:00
2021-04-28	Loss	(Thailand) Saemapetch Fairtex	ONE Championship: Full Blast	Singapore	KO (Straight to the body)	1	2:12
2020-12-08	Win	(Thailand) Shadow Thor.Thepsutin	Lumpinee Birthday Show, Lumpinee Stadium	Bangkok, Thailand	KO (left hook)	2	
2020-08-28	Loss	(Thailand) Rodlek P.K. Saenchaimuaythaigym	ONE Championship: A New Breed, Bantamweight Tournament Final	Bangkok, Thailand	Decision (Unanimous)	3	3:00
2020-07-31	Win	(Thailand) Sangmanee Sor Tienpo	ONE Championship: No Surrender 3, Bantamweight Tournament Semi-Final	Bangkok, Thailand	KO (Left Cross)	1	2:45
2019-10-05	Loss	(Thailand) Nuenglanlek Jitmuangnon	Yod Muay Thai Naikhanomton	Buriram, Thailand	TKO (Knees to the Body)	4	
2019-09-06	Win	(France) Bobo Sacko	ONE Championship: Immortal Triumph	Ho Chi Minh City, Vietnam	Decision (Unanimous)	3	3:00
2019-06-26	Win	(Thailand) Shadow Suanaharnpeekmai	RuamponkonSamui + Kiatpetch Super Fight	Surat Thani, Thailand	Decision	5	3:00
2019-05-10	Win	(Thailand) Nuenglanlek Jitmuangnon	Lumpinee Stadium	Bangkok, Thailand	Decision	5	3:00
2019-03-19	Win	(Thailand) Ferrari Jakrayanmuaythai	Lumpinee Stadium	Bangkok, Thailand	Decision	5	3:00
Wins the vacant Lumpinee Stadium Super Lightweight (140 lbs) title
2019-02-12	Loss	(Thailand) Nuenglanlek Jitmuangnon	Lumpinee Stadium	Bangkok, Thailand	KO (Right high kick)	4	
2018-11-08	Loss	(Thailand) Tawanchai PK Saenchaimuaythaigym	Lumpinee Stadium	Bangkok, Thailand	Decision	5	3:00
2018-10-05	Loss	(Thailand) Tawanchai PK Saenchaimuaythaigym	Muay Thai Expo: The Legend of Muay Thai	Buriram, Thailand	Decision	5	3:00
2018-09-07	Loss	(Thailand) Tawanchai PK Saenchaimuaythaigym	Lumpinee Stadium	Bangkok, Thailand	Decision	5	3:00
2018-07-06	Win	(Thailand) Muangthai PKSaenchaimuaythaigym	Samui Super Fight	Koh Samui, Thailand	TKO (Left cross)	3	1:15
2018-06-05	Draw	(Thailand) Muangthai PKSaenchaimuaythaigym	Lumpinee Stadium	Bangkok, Thailand	Decision	5	3:00
2018-05-01	Win	(Thailand) Nuenglanlek Jitmuangnon	Lumpinee Stadium	Bangkok, Thailand	Decision	5	3:00
2018-04-01	Win	(Thailand) Darky Sawansangmanja	Channel 7 Stadium	Bangkok, Thailand	Decision	5	3:00
2018-02-18	Win	(Japan) Genji Umeno	Rebels 54	Tokyo, Japan	KO (Left cross)	4	
Wins the vacant Lumpinee Stadium Lightweight (135 lbs) title.
2017-11-07	Loss	(Thailand) Muangthai PKSaenchaimuaythaigym	Petchkiatpetch Fight, Lumpinee Stadium	Bangkok, Thailand	Decision	5	3:00
2017-09-08	Win	(Thailand) Phetganat MuDen	Lumpinee Stadium	Bangkok, Thailand	KO (Punches)	3	
Wins the Thailand Lightweight (135 lbs) title.
2017-08-13	Draw	(Thailand) Phetganat MuDen	Channel 7 Stadium	Bangkok, Thailand	Decision	5	3:00
2017-07-14	Win	(Thailand) Pinphet Sitjadaeng	Lumpinee Stadium	Bangkok, Thailand	KO (Left cross)	3	
2017-05-07	Win	(Thailand) Pinphet Sitjadaeng	Channel 7 Stadium	Bangkok, Thailand	Decision	5	3:00
2017-04-05	Win	(Thailand) Petchmahachon Jitmuangnon		Thailand	Decision	5	3:00
2017-02-12	Win	(Thailand) Desellek MU-Den	Channel 7 Stadium	Bangkok, Thailand	KO (Left cross)	3	
2017-01-08	Win	(Thailand) Talaydam Sor Kitrongrot	Channel 7 Stadium	Bangkok, Thailand	KO	3	
2016-09-18	Win	(Thailand) Chamuakphet Sor. Sakunthong	Channel 7 Stadium	Bangkok, Thailand	KO (Flying knee)	2	
2016-08-07	Win	(Thailand) Petaek Kiat WorSurin	Channel 7 Stadium	Bangkok, Thailand	Decision	5	3:00
2016-06-26	Win	(Thailand) Aikphipop Mor.Krungthepthonburi	Channel 7 Stadium	Bangkok, Thailand	KO (Left elbow)	3	
2016-05-29	Win	(Thailand) Konglai Kaewsamrit	Channel 7 Stadium	Bangkok, Thailand	KO (Body punch + knee)	2	
2016-04-24	Win	(Thailand) Petch Tor.Thepsuthin	Channel 7 Stadium	Bangkok, Thailand	KO (Left cross)	2	
2016-04-20	Win	(Thailand) Suntos Tanbangsean	Channel 7 Stadium	Bangkok, Thailand	KO	3	
2016-01-07	Loss	(Thailand) Nopakao Sitjepin	Channel 7 Stadium	Bangkok, Thailand	Decision	5	3:00
2015-10-04	Win	(Thailand) Mantongkam Sitpanancheong		Nonthaburi, Thailand	KO	2	
2015-09-04	Win	(Thailand) Mongkolchai Chonburi	Lumpinee Stadium	Bangkok, Thailand	Decision	5	3:00
Legend: Win Loss Draw/No contest Notes

== Professional boxing record ==
4 fights	2 wins	2 losses
By knockout	1	1
By decision	1	1

No.	Result	Record	Opponent	Type	Round, time	Date	Location	Notes
4	Loss	2–2	(Thailand) Phoobadin Yoohanngoh	UD	10	11 Jul 2020	Suan Lum Night Bazaar Ratchadaphisek, Bangkok, Thailand	For vacant WBA Asia super lightweight title
3	Loss	2–1	(Thailand) Thotsaphol Thongplew	KO	1 (3), 2:51	14 Dec 2019	Suan Lum Night Bazaar Ratchadaphisek, Bangkok, Thailand	The Fighter welterweight Tournament semi-final
2	Win	2–0	(Thailand) Phruethikorn Chaichongcharoen	UD	3	7 Dec 2019	Suan Lum Night Bazaar Ratchadaphisek, Bangkok, Thailand	The Fighter welterweight Tournament quarter-final
1	Win	1–0	(Thailand) Samit Jaibun	KO	2 (3), 2:21	30 Nov 2019	Suan Lum Night Bazaar Ratchadaphisek, Bangkok, Thailand	The Fighter welterweight Tournament Round of 16
