= Yodlekpet Or.Atchariya =

Thai professional Muay Thai fighter

- Born: December 2, 1994 (age 31); Suwannaphum, Roi Et, Thailand
- Other names: Yodlekpet Or.Pitisak
- Nickname: The Punch Destroyer
- Height: 162 cm (5 ft 4 in)
- Division: Super featherweight Lightweight
- Style: Muay Thai (Muay Bouk)
- Stance: Southpaw
- Fighting out of: Bangkok, Thailand
- Team: Sor.Sommai (2023-present); Teeded99 (2018-2023); Por Burapha (2015-2017); Sor.Sommai (2008-2015)

Kickboxing record
- Total: 138
- Wins: 95
- Losses: 40
- Draws: 3

Yodlekpet Or.Atchariya (Thai: ยอดเหล็กเพชร อ.อัจฉริยะ), is a Thai professional Muay Thai fighter. He is a former one-time Lumpinee Stadium champion and three-time Rajadamnern Stadium champion across two divisions. He is especially known for his aggressive fighting style and short stature.

== Career ==
Yodlekpet started training and competing in Muay Thai at the age of 10 with his father. At 13 he moved to Bangkok to join the Sor.Sommai camp.

In November 2018, Yodlekpet Or. Pitisak was ranked the #1 Light weight ranked on Rajadamnern Stadium by muaythai2000.com.

In December 2018, Yodlekpet was ranked #3 Light weight on Lumpinee Stadium by muaythai2000.com.

Yodlekpet faced Silviu Vitez on January 27, 2023, at ONE Friday Fights 2. He won the fight via technical knockout after the doctor stopped the fight due to a cut.

Yodlekpet faced Saman Ashouri on March 17, 2023, at ONE Friday Fights 9. He won the fight via knockout in the second round.

== Titles and accomplishments ==
- KNOCK OUT
  - 2019 KNOCK OUT Lightweight Asian Tournament Champion
  - 2018 KNOCK OUT Lightweight Champion
- Rajadamnern Stadium
  - 2021 Rajadamnern Stadium Super Lightweight (140 lbs) Champion
  - 2017 Rajadamnern Stadium Lightweight (135 lbs) Champion
  - 2015 Rajadamnern Stadium Lightweight (135 lbs) Champion
- Lumpinee Stadium
  - 2017 Lumpinee Stadium Lightweight (135 lbs) Champion

Awards

- 2017 Siam Kela Fighter of the Year

== Fight record ==
Kickboxing record
95 Wins, 40 Losses, 3 Draws
Date	Result	Opponent	Event	Location	Method	Round	Time
2026-11-13		(Myanmar) Kyaw Sar Min	ONE Friday Fights 178, Lumpinee Stadium	Bangkok, Thailand			
2026-09-11	Loss	(Morocco) Mohamed Taoufyq	ONE Friday Fights 170, Lumpinee Stadium	Bangkok, Thailand	Decision (Unanimous)	3	3:00
2026-06-05	Win	(Myanmar) Saw Min Min	ONE Friday Fights 157, Lumpinee Stadium	Bangkok, Thailand	Decision (Unanimous)	3	3:00
2026-03-20	Win	(Thailand) Gingsanglek Tor.Laksong	ONE Friday Fights 147, Lumpinee Stadium	Bangkok, Thailand	KO (Right hook)	3	1:25
2025-11-21	Win	(Azerbaijan) Anar Mammadov	ONE Friday Fights 134, Lumpinee Stadium	Bangkok, Thailand	Decision (Unanimous)	3	3:00
2025-09-26	Loss	(Thailand) Pompet Panthonggym	ONE Friday Fights 126, Lumpinee Stadium	Bangkok, Thailand	Decision (Split)	3	3:00
2025-08-15	Win	(Thailand) Pompet Panthonggym	ONE Friday Fights 120, Lumpinee Stadium	Bangkok, Thailand	Decision (Split)	3	3:00
2025-06-20	Win	(Thailand) Donking Yotharakmuaythai	ONE Friday Fights 113, Lumpinee Stadium	Bangkok, Thailand	KO (Left cross)	1	2:21
2025-03-23	Loss	(Japan) Shimon Yoshinari	ONE 172	Saitama, Japan	Decision (Unanimous)	3	3:00
2025-01-31	Loss	(Thailand) Jawsuayai Sor.Dechaphan	ONE Friday Fights 95, Lumpinee Stadium	Bangkok, Thailand	KO (Right hook)	2	1:35
2024-11-01	Win	(Thailand) Puengluang Baanrambaa	ONE Friday Fights 85, Lumpinee Stadium	Bangkok, Thailand	KO (Left cross)	3	0:53
2024-08-30	Loss	(Thailand) Kongsuk Fairtex	ONE Friday Fights 77, Lumpinee Stadium	Bangkok, Thailand	Decision (Unanimous)	3	3:00
2024-06-28	Win	(Thailand) Komawut FA Group	ONE Friday Fights 68, Lumpinee Stadium	Bangkok, Thailand	Decision (Unanimous)	3	3:00
2023-11-17	Loss	(Russia) Tagir Khalilov	ONE Friday Fights 41, Lumpinee Stadium	Bangkok, Thailand	Decision (Split)	3	3:00
2023-09-22	Loss	(Thailand) Muangthai P.K. Saenchaimuaythaigym	ONE Friday Fights 34, Lumpinee Stadium	Bangkok, Thailand	Decision (unanimous)	3	3:00
2023-07-14	Win	(Australia) Jordan Godtfredsen	ONE Friday Fights 25, Lumpinee Stadium	Bangkok, Thailand	Decision (Split)	3	3:00
2023-05-19	Win	(Bosnia and Herzegovina) Denis Purić	ONE Friday Fights 17, Lumpinee Stadium	Bangkok, Thailand	TKO (3 Knockdowns)	3	2:09
2023-03-17	Win	(Iran) Saman Ashouri	ONE Friday Fights 9, Lumpinee Stadium	Bangkok, Thailand	KO (Punch)	2	0:27
2023-01-27	Win	(Romania) Silviu Vitez	ONE Friday Fights 2, Lumpinee Stadium	Bangkok, Thailand	TKO (Doctor stoppage)	2	2:08
2022-12-17	Win	(Thailand) Rungkit Bor.Rungrot	Sinbi Stadium	Phuket, Thailand	KO (Low kicks)	3	
2022-11-18	Loss	(Thailand) Tapaokaew Singmawynn	Ruamponkon + Prachin	Prachinburi province, Thailand	Decision	5	3:00
2022-10-28	Win	(Thailand) Rungkit Bor.Rungrot	Rajadamnern World Series	Bangkok, Thailand	Decision (Unanimous)	3	3:00
2022-10-01	Win	(Thailand) Kulabdam Sor.Jor.Piek-U-Thai	Muay Thai Vithee TinThai + Kiatpetch	Buriram province, Thailand	Decision	5	3:00
2022-08-02	Win	(Thailand) Sangmanee P.K.Saenchaimuaythaigym	Birthday Pitaktham Super Fight	Songkhla province, Thailand	Decision	5	3:00
2022-06-29	Loss	(Thailand) Kaonar P.K. Saenchai Muaythaigym	Muaythai Palangmai, Rajadamnern Stadium	Bangkok, Thailand	Decision	5	3:00
2022-04-16	Loss	(Thailand) Kaonar P.K. Saenchai Muaythaigym	Pitaktham + Sor.Sommai	Phayao province, Thailand	Referee stoppage	4	
2022-03-11	Draw	(Thailand) Kaonar P.K. Saenchai Muaythaigym	Pitaktham + Sor.Sommai + Palangmai	Songkhla province, Thailand	Decision	5	3:00
2021-12-30	Loss	(Thailand) Kaonar P.K. Saenchai Muaythaigym	Muay Thai SAT Super Fight WiteetinThai	Phuket, Thailand	Decision	5	3:00
2021-11-26	Win	(Thailand) Kulabdam Sor.Jor.Piek-U-Thai	Muaythai Moradok Kon Thai + Rajadamnern Super Fight	Buriram, Thailand	Decision	5	3:00
Wins the vacant Rajadamnern Stadium Super Lightweight (140 lbs) title.
2021-09-18	Loss	(Thailand) Petchmahachon Jitmuangnon	Suek Jao Muay Thai, Fonjang Chonburi Stadium	Chonburi, Thailand	Decision	5	3:00
For the Omnoi Stadium Lightweight (135 lbs) title.
2021-04-09	Win	(Thailand) Prabsuek Siopol	Pitaktam, Lumpinee Stadium	Bangkok, Thailand	KO (Low Kick)	3	
2021-02-14	Loss	(Thailand) Ferrari Fairtex	Channel 7 Stadium	Bangkok, Thailand	Decision (Majority)	5	3:00
2020-11-17	Win	(Thailand) Saeksan Or. Kwanmuang	Sor.Sommai, CentralPlaza Nakhon Ratchasima	Nakhon Ratchasima, Thailand	Decision	5	3:00
2020-10-15	Loss	(Thailand) Tapaokaew Singmawynn	Petchaophraya, Rajadamnern Stadium	Bangkok, Thailand	Decision	5	3:00
2020-09-10	Loss	(Thailand) Rungkit Wor.Sanprapai	Sor.Sommai Birthday, Rajadamnern Stadium	Bangkok, Thailand	Decision	5	3:00
2020-07-15	Loss	(Thailand) Kaonar P.K.SaenchaiMuaythaiGym	Rajadamnern Stadium	Bangkok, Thailand	Decision	5	3:00
2020-01-31	Loss	(Thailand) Rodtang Jitmuangnon	Phuket Super Fight Real Muay Thai	Mueang Phuket District, Thailand	Decision	5	3:00
2019-12-23	Loss	(Thailand) Nuenglanlek Jitmuangnon	Rajadamnern Stadium	Bangkok, Thailand	Decision (Unanimous)	5	3:00
2019-11-07	Win	(France) Rafi Bohic	Ruamponkon Prachin	Prachinburi, Thailand	Decision	5	3:00
2019-08-16	Loss	(Thailand) Sangmanee Sor Tienpo		Songkla, Thailand	Decision (Unanimous)	5	3:00
2019-07-04	Loss	(Thailand) Nuenglanlek Jitmuangnon	Rajadamnern Stadium	Bangkok, Thailand	Decision (Unanimous)	5	3:00
2019-04-29	Win	(Korea) Chan Hyung Lee	KNOCK OUT 2019 SPRING: THE FUTURE IS IN THE RING	Tokyo, Japan	Decision (Unanimous)	5	3:00
Wins Lightweight Asian Tournament and defends the KNOCK OUT -61.5kg Title.
2019-02-11	Win	(Mongolia) Altandulguun Boldbaatar	KNOCK OUT 2019 WINTER: THE ANSWER IS IN THE RING	Tokyo, Japan	Decision (Unanimous)	5	3:00
2018-12-21	Loss	(Thailand) Saeksan Or. Kwanmuang	Rajadamnern Stadium	Bangkok, Thailand	Decision	5	3:00
2018-11-29	Win	(Thailand) Sangmanee Sor Tienpo	Rajadamnern Stadium	Bangkok, Thailand	Decision	5	3:00
2018-10-07	Win	(Japan) Yusuke Iwaki	KNOCK OUT 2018 cross over	Tokyo, Japan	Decision (Unanimous)	5	3:00
2018-08-19	Win	(Japan) Kazuma Takahashi	KNOCK OUT SUMMER FES.2018	Tokyo, Japan	Decision (Unanimous)	5	3:00
2018-06-28	Win	(Thailand) Sangmanee Sor Tienpo	Rajadamnern Stadium	Bangkok, Thailand	Decision	5	3:00
2018-05-17	Draw	(Thailand) Yodpanomrung Jitmuangnon	Rajadamnern Stadium	Bangkok, Thailand	Decision	5	3:00
2018-04-14	Win	(Japan) Yosuke Morii	KNOCK OUT Sakura Burst	Kawasaki, Japan	TKO (Doctor stop./broken nose)	2	1:15
Wins the KNOCK OUT -61.5kg Title.
2018-02-20	Win	(Thailand) Panpayak Jitmuangnon	Onesongchai Fights, Lumpinee Stadium	Bangkok, Thailand	Decision	5	3:00
2018-01-18	Win	(Thailand) Sangmanee Sor Tienpo	Rajadamnern Stadium	Bangkok, Thailand	Decision	5	3:00
2017-11-15	Win	(Thailand) Rodlek Jaotalaytong	Rajadamnern Stadium	Bangkok, Thailand	Decision	5	3:00
2017-09-11	Win	(Thailand) Panpayak Sitjatik	Rajadamnern Stadium	Bangkok, Thailand	KO	3	
Wins the Rajadamnern Stadium Lightweight (135 lbs) title.
2017-06-09	Win	(Thailand) Rambo Pet.Por.Tor.Or	Lumpinee Stadium	Bangkok, Thailand	TKO (Referee stop/Punches + Low kicks)	4	
Wins the vacant Lumpinee Stadium Lightweight (135 lbs) title.
2017-05-05	Loss	(Thailand) Muangthai PKSaenchaimuaythaigym	Lumpinee Stadium	Bangkok, Thailand	Decision	5	3:00
2017-03-29	Win	(Thailand) Panpayak Sitjatik	Rajadamnern Stadium	Bangkok, Thailand	Decision	5	3:00
2017-03-02	Win	(Thailand) Phetngam Kiatkumphon	Rajadamnern Stadium	Bangkok, Thailand	KO	4	
2017-02-02	Win	(Thailand) Bangpleenoi 96Penang	Rajadamnern Stadium	Bangkok, Thailand	KO (Left Body Cross)	2	
2016-12-22	Loss	(Thailand) Saeksan Or. Kwanmuang	Rajadamnern Stadium	Bangkok, Thailand	Decision	5	3:00
2016-10-23	Loss	(Japan) Genji Umeno	REBELS.46	Tokyo, Japan	Decision	5	3:00
Loses the Rajadamnern Stadium Lightweight (135 lbs) title.
2016-09-23	Win	(Thailand) Panpayak Sitjatik	Lumpinee Stadium	Bangkok, Thailand	KO (Left Knee to the Body)	3	
2016-09-02	Loss	(Thailand) Muangthai PKSaenchaimuaythaigym	Lumpinee Stadium	Bangkok, Thailand	Decision	5	3:00
2016-08-11	Win	(Thailand) Kaimukkao Por.Thairongruangkamai	Rajadamnern Stadium	Bangkok, Thailand	KO (Left Low Kicks)	2	
2016-07-18	Win	(Thailand) Panpayak Sitjatik	Rajadamnern Stadium	Bangkok, Thailand	KO (Right Hook)	4	
2016-06-24	Loss	(Thailand) Kaimukkao Por.Thairongruangkamai	Lumpinee Stadium	Bangkok, Thailand	Decision	5	3:00
2016-05-30	Win	(Thailand) Songkom Nayoksanya	Rajadamnern Stadium	Bangkok, Thailand	Decision	5	3:00
2016-05-05	Win	(Thailand) Kongsak Saenchaimuaythaigym	Rajadamnern Stadium	Bangkok, Thailand	Decision	5	3:00
2016-01-24	Loss	(Thailand) Rodlek Jaotalaytong	Samui Festival	Ko Samui, Thailand	Decision	5	3:00
2015-12-23	Win	(Japan) Genji Umeno	Rajadamnern Stadium	Bangkok, Thailand	TKO (Referee Stoppage/ Left Elbow)	3	
2015-11-18	Win	(Thailand) Samingdeat Dekfaifa	Rajadamnern Stadium	Bangkok, Thailand	KO (Right Hook)	3	
Wins the Rajadamnern Stadium Lightweight (135 lbs) title.
2015-10-22	Win	(Thailand) Chalamtong Sitpanont	Rajadamnern Stadium	Bangkok, Thailand	Decision	5	3:00
2015-09-10	Loss	(Thailand) Phonek Mor.Phuwana	Rajadamnern Stadium	Bangkok, Thailand	Decision	5	3:00
2015-07-15	Win	(Thailand) Kiatphet Peakmai Restaurant	Rajadamnern Stadium	Bangkok, Thailand	Decision	5	3:00
2015-03-06	Loss	(Thailand) Aranchai Kiatpataraphan	Lumpinee Stadium	Bangkok, Thailand	Decision	5	3:00
2014-11-07	Loss	(Thailand) Auisiewpor Sujibamikiew	Lumpinee Stadium	Bangkok, Thailand	Decision	5	3:00
2014-09-25	Win	(Thailand) Por.Tor.Thor. Petchrungruang	Rajadamnern Stadium	Bangkok, Thailand	Decision	5	3:00
2014-08-25	Win	(Thailand) Eakrit Mor.kungteptonburi	Lumpinee Stadium	Bangkok, Thailand	Decision	5	3:00
Legend: Win Loss Draw/No contest Notes
