= 2020 in ONE Championship =

Mixed martial arts events

Information
- First date: January 10, 2020
- Last date: December 25, 2020

Events
- Total events: 26
- One Championship: 20
- Warrior Series: 1
- Hero Series: 2
- Road To Events: 3

Fights
- Total fights: 189
- Title fights: 17

The year 2020 was the 10th year in the history of the ONE Championship, a mixed martial arts, kickboxing and muay thai promotion based in Singapore.

== Background ==
Chatri Sityodtong announced that ONE Championship intended to do 50 events in 2020.

== ONE Championship 2020 Awards ==
The following fighters won the ONE Championship year-end awards for 2020:

- ONE Championship Fight of the Year 2020: Martin Nguyen vs. Thanh Le (ONE: Inside the Matrix)
- ONE Championship Knockout of the Year 2020: Thanh Le against Martin Nguyen (ONE: Inside the Matrix)
- ONE Championship Submission of the Year 2020: Reinier de Ridder against Aung La Nsang (ONE: Inside the Matrix)
- ONE Championship Breakthrough of the Year 2020: Allycia Rodrigues

== List of events ==
=== ONE Infinity ===
ONE Infinity
No.	Event	Date	Venue	Location
–	ONE Infinity 1 (Cancelled)	May 29, 2020	Mall of Asia Arena	Pasay, Philippines

=== ONE Championship ===
ONE Championship
No.	Event	Date	Venue	Location
1	ONE Championship: A New Tomorrow	January 10, 2020	IMPACT Arena	Bangkok, Thailand
2	ONE Championship: Fire & Fury	January 31, 2020	Mall of Asia Arena	Pasay, Philippines
3	ONE Championship: Warrior’s Code	February 7, 2020	Istora Senayan	Jakarta, Indonesia
4	ONE Championship: King of the Jungle	February 28, 2020	Singapore Indoor Stadium	Singapore
–	ONE Championship: Hope (Cancelled)	–	–	Singapore
–	ONE Championship: Strength (Cancelled)	–	–	Singapore
-	ONE Championship: Dreams (Cancelled)	–	–	Singapore
–	ONE Championship: Inspiration (Cancelled)	–	–	Singapore
–	ONE Championship: Battle for the Ages (Cancelled)	–	Istora Senayan	Jakarta, Indonesia
–	ONE Championship: Legendary Warriors (Cancelled)	June 19, 2020	–	Shanghai, China
–	ONE Championship: Heart of Heroes (Cancelled)	June 26, 2020	Phú Thọ Indoor Stadium	Ho Chi Minh City, Vietnam
5	ONE Championship: No Surrender	July 31, 2020	IMPACT Arena	Bangkok, Thailand
6	ONE Championship: No Surrender 2	July 31, 2020	IMPACT Arena	Bangkok, Thailand
7	ONE Championship: No Surrender 3	July 31, 2020	IMPACT Arena	Bangkok, Thailand
8	ONE Championship: A New Breed	August 28, 2020	IMPACT Arena	Bangkok, Thailand
9	ONE Championship: A New Breed 2	August 28, 2020	IMPACT Arena	Bangkok, Thailand
10	ONE Championship: A New Breed 3	August 28, 2020	IMPACT Arena	Bangkok, Thailand
11	ONE Championship: Reign of Dynasties	October 9, 2020	Singapore Indoor Stadium	Singapore
12	ONE Championship: Reign of Dynasties 2	October 9, 2020	Singapore Indoor Stadium	Singapore
13	ONE Championship: Inside the Matrix	October 30, 2020	Singapore Indoor Stadium	Singapore
14	ONE Championship: Inside the Matrix 2	October 30, 2020	Singapore Indoor Stadium	Singapore
15	ONE Championship: Inside the Matrix 3	October 30, 2020	Singapore Indoor Stadium	Singapore
16	ONE Championship: Inside the Matrix 4	October 30, 2020	Singapore Indoor Stadium	Singapore
17	ONE Championship: Big Bang	December 4, 2020	Singapore Indoor Stadium	Singapore
18	ONE Championship: Big Bang 2	December 4, 2020	Singapore Indoor Stadium	Singapore
19	ONE Championship: Collision Course	December 18, 2020	Singapore Indoor Stadium	Singapore
20	ONE Championship: Collision Course 2	December 18, 2020	Singapore Indoor Stadium	Singapore

=== Road to ONE ===
Road to ONE
No.	Event	Date	Venue	Location
1	Road to ONE 3: Tokyo Fight Night	September 20, 2020	Tsutaya O-East	Tokyo, Japan
2	Road to ONE 4: Fair Fight 13	November 28, 2020	Akademiya Yedinoborstv Rmk	Yekaterinburg, Russia
3	Road to ONE 5: WSS	December 7, 2020	World Siam Stadium	Bangkok, Thailand
–	Road to ONE 6: WSS (Cancelled)	December 25, 2020	World Siam Stadium	Bangkok, Thailand

=== ONE Hero Series ===
ONE Hero Series
No.	Event	Date	Venue	Location
1	ONE Hero Series 13	June 20, 2020		Shanghai, China
2	ONE Hero Series 14	June 21, 2020		Shanghai, China

=== ONE Warrior Series ===
ONE Warriors Series
No.	Event	Date	Venue	Location
1	ONE Warrior Series 10	February 19, 2020		Singapore

== Grand Prix Participant ==
=== 4-Man Muay Thai Bantamweight 66 kg GP Participant ===
- (Thailand) Saemapetch Fairtex
- (Thailand) Rodlek P.K. Saenchaimuaythaigym
- (Thailand) Kulabdam Sor.Jor.Piek-U-Thai
- (Thailand) Sangmanee Sor Tienpo

== Grand Prix bracket ==
=== ONE Bantamweight Muay Thai Tournament bracket ===
Semi-finals
(Thailand) Saemapetch Fairtex	MD
(Thailand) Rodlek P.K. Saenchaimuaythaigym	3r.
(Thailand) Kulabdam Sor.Jor.Piek-U-Thai	KO
(Thailand) Sangmanee Sor Tienpo	1r.

Final
(Thailand) Rodlek P.K. Saenchaimuaythaigym	UD
(Thailand) Kulabdam Sor.Jor.Piek-U-Thai	3r.

- Rodlek P.K. Saenchaimuaythaigym replaced injured Saemapetch Fairtex at the final.

== ONE Championship: A New Tomorrow ==
ONE Championship: A New Tomorrow
- Promotion: ONE Championship
- Date: January 10, 2020
- Venue: IMPACT Arena
- City: Bangkok, Thailand

ONE Championship: A New Tomorrow (also known as ONE Championship 106: Rodtang vs. Haggerty 2) was a combat sport event held by ONE Championship on January 10, 2020, at the IMPACT Arena in Bangkok, Thailand.

=== Background ===
The event featured a rematch between Rodtang Jitmuangnon and Jonathan Haggerty for the ONE Flyweight Muay Thai World Championship as the event headliner. Haggerty lost their previous fight by a unanimous decision. The co-main even featured the ONE Atomweight Kickboxing and Muay Thai champion Stamp Fairtex in an MMA bout against Puja Tomar.

=== Results ===
ONE: A New Tomorrow
Weight Class				Method	Round	Time	Notes
Flyweight 61 kg	(Thailand) Rodtang Jitmuangnon (c)	def.	(England) Jonathan Haggerty	TKO (3 Knockdown Rule)	3	2:39	For the ONE Flyweight Muay Thai World Championship
W.Atomweight 52 kg	(Thailand) Stamp Fairtex	def.	(India) Puja Tomar	TKO (Elbows)	1	4:27	
Bantamweight 66 kg	(Thailand) Sangmanee Sor Tienpo	def.	(Japan) Kenta Yamada	Decision (Unanimous)	3	3:00	Muay Thai
Featherweight 70 kg	(United States) Thanh Le	def.	(Japan) Ryogo Takahashi	KO (Punches)	1	2:51	
Bantamweight 66 kg	(England) Liam Harrison	def.	(Malaysia) Mohammed Bin Mahmoud	KO (Punches)	1	2:03	Muay Thai
Preliminary Card
Bantamweight 66 kg	(Thailand) Muangthai PKSaenchaimuaythaigym	def.	(France) Brice Delval	Decision (Split)	3	3:00	Muay Thai
Welterweight 84 kg	(Russia) Raimond Magomedaliev	def.	(United States) Joey Pierotti	Submission (Guillotine Choke)	1	3:50	
Bantamweight 66 kg	(France) Adam Noi	def.	(France) Victor Pinto	Decision (Unanimous)	3	3:00	Kickboxing
Featherweight 70 kg	(Mongolia) Shinechagtga Zoltsetseg	def.	(China) Jia Wen Ma	KO (Punches)	1	0:55	
Bantamweight 66 kg	(France) Mehdi Zatout	def.	(China) Han Zihao	Decision (Split Criteria)	3	3:00	Muay Thai
W.Strawweight 57 kg	(Japan) Ayaka Miura	def.	(Brazil) Maira Mazar	Submission (Americana)	2	3:01	
Featherweight 70 kg	(Philippines) Roel Rosauro	def.	(Indonesia) Yohan Mulia Legowo	Decision (Unanimous)	3	5:00	

== ONE Championship: Fire & Fury ==
ONE Championship: Fire & Fury
- Promotion: ONE Championship
- Date: January 31, 2020
- Venue: Mall of Asia Arena
- City: Pasay, Philippines

ONE Championship: Fire & Fury (also known as ONE Championship 107: Pacio vs. Silva) was a combat sport event held by ONE Championship on January 31, 2020, at the Mall of Asia Arena in Pasay, Philippines.

=== Background ===
Eduard Folayang was scheduled to face Ahmed Mujtaba, but Mujtaba was forced off the card on January 16 with an injury. Pieter Buist served as Mujtaba replacement, takes short notice fight against Folayang.

=== Results ===
ONE: Fire & Fury
Weight Class				Method	Round	Time	Notes
Strawweight 57 kg	(Philippines) Joshua Pacio (c)	def.	(Brazil) Alex Silva	Decision (Split)	5	5:00	For the ONE Strawweight World Championship
Lightweight 77 kg	(Netherlands) Pieter Buist	def.	(Philippines) Eduard Folayang	Decision (Split)	3	5:00	
Flyweight 61 kg	(Philippines) Danny Kingad	def.	(China) Xie Wei	Decision (Unanimous)	3	5:00	
Flyweight 61 kg	(Thailand) Petchdam Petchyindee Academy	def.	(Japan) Kohei Kodera	Decision (Majority)	3	3:00	Muay Thai
Bantamweight 66 kg	(Japan) Shoko Sato	def.	(South Korea) Kwon Won Il	Submission (Rear-Naked Choke)	1	4:05	
Preliminary Card
Bantamweight 66 kg	(Japan) Tatsumitsu Wada	def.	(Brazil) Ivanildo Delfino	Decision (Unanimous)	3	5:00	
W.Atomweight 52 kg	(Norway) Anne Line Hogstad	def.	(Australia) Alma Juniku	Decision (Majority)	3	3:00	Muay Thai
Strawweight 57 kg	(Philippines) Lito Adiwang	def.	(Thailand) Pongsiri Mitsatit	Submission (Kimura)	1	3:02	
W.Atomweight 52 kg	(Philippines) Gina Iniong	def.	(India) Asha Roka	Decision (Unanimous)	3	5:00	
Bantamweight 66 kg	(Thailand) Rodlek Jaotalaytong	def.	(Scotland) Chris Shaw	Decision (Unanimous)	3	3:00	Muay Thai
W.Atomweight 52 kg	(Philippines) Jomary Torres	–	(Taiwan) Jenny Huang	No Contest (Unintentional Low Blow)	1	2:22	

== ONE Championship: Warrior's Code ==
ONE Championship: Warrior's Code
- Promotion: ONE Championship
- Date: February 7, 2020
- Venue: Istora Senayan
- City: Jakarta, Indonesia

ONE Championship: Warrior's Code (also known as ONE Championship 108) was a combat sport event held by ONE Championship on February 7, 2020, at the Istora Senayan in Jakarta, Indonesia.

=== Background ===
The ONE Muay Thai Featherweight Championship bout between Phetmorakot Petchyindee Academy and Jamal Yusupov was expected for ONE Championship: Warrior’s Code main event. However, on January 30, Yusupov pulled out of the bout due to an injury. The Russian veteran, has been replaced by Thailand’s Detrit Sathian in the main event for the ONE Muay Thai Featherweight Championship. Detrit was later replaced by fellow Thai Pongsiri PK. Saenchaimuaythaigym, who took the fight on two days' notice.

Bi Nguyen was forced to withdraw from her bout with Itsuki Hirata due to an elbow injury sustained during training. Nyrene Crowley stepped in on short notice to face Hirata.

=== Results ===
ONE: Warrior’s Code
Weight Class				Method	Round	Time	Notes
Featherweight 70 kg	(Thailand) Phetmorakot Petchyindee Academy	def.	(Thailand) Pongsiri P.K.Saenchaimuaythaigym	Decision (Unanimous)	5	3:00	For the inaugural ONE Featherweight Muay Thai World Championship
Middleweight 93 kg	(Netherlands) Reinier de Ridder	def.	(Brazil) Leandro Ataides	Decision (Unanimous)	3	5:00	
Lightweight 77 kg	(Moldova) Iuri Lapicus	def.	(Russia) Marat Gafurov	Submission (Rear-Naked Choke)	1	1:07	
Flyweight 61 kg	(Indonesia) Eko Roni Saputra	def.	(Cambodia) Khon Sichan	Submission (Rear-Naked Choke)	1	3:45	
Featherweight 70 kg	(Japan) Koyomi Matsushima	def.	(South Korea) Jae-Woong Kim	TKO (Punches)	3	0:24	
Preliminary Card
W.Catchweight 53.4 kg	(Japan) Itsuki Hirata	def.	(New Zealand) Nyrene Crowley	TKO (Punches)	3	3:27	
Catchweight 68 kg	(Indonesia) Sunoto Peringkat	def.	(Indonesia) Nurul Fikri	Decision (Unanimous)	3	5:00	
Flyweight 61 kg	(Indonesia) Abro Fernandes	def.	(Indonesia) Achmad Eko Priandono	Decision (Unanimous)	3	5:00	
Flyweight 61 kg	(Japan) Taiki Naito	def.	(Cyprus) Savvas Michael	Decision (Unanimous)	3	3:00	Muay Thai
Strawweight 57 kg	(Australia) Josh Tonna	def.	(England) Andy Howson	KO (Knee)	2	2:20	Muay Thai
Flyweight 61 kg	(Indonesia) Fajar	def.	(Indonesia) Egi Rozten	TKO (Punches)	1	2:39	

== ONE Warrior Series 10 ==
ONE Warrior Series 10
- Promotion: ONE Championship
- Date: February 19, 2020
- City: Singapore

ONE Warrior Series 10 was a combat sport event held by ONE Championship on February 19, 2020, in Kallang, Singapore.

=== Results ===
ONE Warrior Series 10
Weight Class				Method	Round	Time	Notes
Lightweight 77 kg	(South Korea) Byung-Hee Lim	def.	(New Zealand) Kieran Joblin	TKO (Knees and Punches)	1	3:56	
Featherweight 70 kg	(Egypt) Ahmed Faress	def.	(Northern Ireland) Alan Philpott	Submission (Rear-Naked Choke)	1	2:01	
Featherweight 70 kg	(Japan) Ryoji Kudo	def.	(South Korea) Min-Hyuk Lee	Decision (Unanimous)	3	5:00	
Featherweight 70 kg	(Ukraine) Sasha Moisa	def.	(Pakistan) Shahzaib Rindh	KO (Punches)	3	2:11	Kickboxing
Welterweight 84 kg	(Iran) Mehdi Bagheri	def.	(Japan) Koji Shikuwa	TKO (Retirement)	2	5:00	
Catchweight 62 kg	(Japan) Kanta Motoyama	def.	(United States) Michael Walker	Decision (Unanimous)	3	3:00	Kickboxing
Catchweight 110 kg	(South Africa) Daniel Van Heerden	def.	(Iran) Arash Mardani	TKO (Punches)	1	3:25	
Middleweight 93 kg	(Australia) Marc Grayson	def.	(Australia) Rick Alchin	Submission (Armbar)	3	3:57	
Strawweight 57 kg	(Brunei) Adib Sulaiman	def.	(India) Susovan Ghosh	TKO (Punches)	2	4:59	
W.Atomweight 52 kg	(Pakistan) Anita Karim	def.	(Estonia) Marie Ruumet	Decision (Unanimous)	3	5:00	
Catchweight 60 kg	(India) Manthan Rane	def.	(New Zealand) Joey Baylon	Decision (Unanimous)	3	5:00	
Strawweight 57 kg	(Pakistan) Irfan Ahmad	def.	(Thailand) Peter Danesoe	Decision (Unanimous)	3	5:00	
Bantamweight 66 kg	(Malaysia) Shammah Chandran	def.	(Thailand) Saksit Janhom	TKO (Injury)	1	1:04	
Catchweight 64.5 kg	(India) Rana Rudra Pratap Singh	def.	(South Korea) Seung-Hyun Cho	Submission (Guillotine Choke)	1	1:15	

== ONE Championship: King of the Jungle ==
ONE Championship: King of the Jungle
- Promotion: ONE Championship
- Date: February 28, 2020
- Venue: Singapore Indoor Stadium
- City: Singapore
- Attendance: None (behind closed doors)

ONE Championship: King of the Jungle (also known as ONE Championship 109: Stamp vs. Todd 2) was a combat sport event held by ONE Championship on February 28, 2020, at the Singapore Indoor Stadium in Kallang, Singapore.

=== Background ===
ONE: King of the Jungle was headlined by a title fight between the reigning ONE Women's Atomweight Kickboxing World Champion Stamp Fairtex and Janet Todd. Stamp had previously beaten Todd to win the ONE Atomweight Muay Thai World Title. The co-main event saw Sam-A Gaiyanghadao face Rocky Ogden for the inaugural ONE Strawweight Muay Thai World Championship.

Due to the COVID-19 pandemic, this event was held behind closed doors.

=== Results ===
ONE: King of the Jungle
Weight Class				Method	Round	Time	Notes
W.Atomweight 52 kg	(United States) Janet Todd	def.	(Thailand) Stamp Fairtex (c)	Decision (Split)	5	3:00	For the ONE Women's Atomweight Kickboxing World Championship
Strawweight 57 kg	(Thailand) Sam-A Gaiyanghadao	def.	(Australia) Rocky Ogden	Decision (Unanimous)	5	3:00	For the inaugural ONE Strawweight Muay Thai World Championship
Lightweight 77 kg	(Japan) Kimihiro Eto	def.	(Singapore) Amir Khan	Submission (Rear-Naked Choke)	1	1:39	
Welterweight 84 kg	(Japan) Yoshihiro Akiyama	def.	(Egypt) Sherif Mohamed	KO (Punches)	1	3:04	
Strawweight 57 kg	(Singapore) Tiffany Teo	def.	(Japan) Ayaka Miura	TKO (Punches)	3	4:45	
Preliminary Card
W.Atomweight 52 kg	(Philippines) Denice Zamboanga	def.	(Japan) Mei Yamaguchi	Decision (Unanimous)	3	5:00	
Bantamweight 66 kg	(United States) Troy Worthen	def.	(New Zealand) Mark Abelardo	Decision (Unanimous)	3	5:00	
Featherweight 70 kg	(Philippines) Honorio Banario	def.	(Thailand) Shannon Wiratchai	Decision (Split)	3	5:00	
W.Atomweight 52 kg	(India) Ritu Phogat	def.	(Taiwan) Wu Chiao Chen	Decision (Unanimous)	3	5:00	
Welterweight 84 kg	(Russia) Murad Ramazanov	def.	(South Korea) Bae Myung Ho	TKO (Punches)	1	4:53	
Bantamweight 66 kg	(Canada) Jeff Chan	def.	(Singapore) Radeem Rahman	Submission (Rear-Naked Choke)	2	2:00	

== ONE Infinity 1 (Cancelled) ==
ONE Infinity 1
- Promotion: ONE Championship
- City: Manila, Philippines

ONE Infinity 1 was expected to be a combat sport event held by ONE Championship in Manila, Philippines. The event was cancelled due to the COVID-19 pandemic.

=== Background ===
The event was originally expected to take place in Chongqing, China on April 11. However, on February 6, the event was moved to the Istora Senayan in Jakarta, Indonesia due to the COVID-19 pandemic. Next the event was once again rescheduled, this time for 29 May in Manila, Philippines. The event was cancelled due to the COVID-19 pandemic.

Former UFC Flyweight Champion Demetrious Johnson was handed a shot at reigning ONE Flyweight Champion, Adriano Moraes.

A ONE Light Heavyweight Kickboxing World Championship bout between current champion Roman Kryklia and former SUPERKOMBAT Super Cruiserweight Champion Andrei Stoica was slated to serve as the event co-headliner.

=== Fight Card ===
ONE Infinity 1 (Cancelled)
Weight Class				Method	Round	Time	Notes
Flyweight 61 kg	(Brazil) Adriano Moraes (c)	vs.	(United States) Demetrious Johnson				For the ONE Flyweight World Championship
Light Heavyweight 102 kg	(Ukraine) Roman Kryklia (c)	vs.	(Romania) Andrei Stoica				For the ONE Light Heavyweight Kickboxing World Championship
Middleweight 93 kg	(Myanmar) Aung La Nsang (c)	vs.	(Russia) Vitaly Bigdash				For the ONE Middleweight World Championship

== ONE Hero Series 13 ==
ONE Hero Series 13
- Promotion: ONE Championship
- Date: June 20, 2020
- City: Shanghai, China
- Attendance: None (behind closed doors)

ONE Hero Series 13 was a combat sport event held by ONE Championship on June 20, 2020, in Shanghai, China.

=== Results ===
ONE Hero Series 13
Weight Class				Method	Round	Time	Notes
Strawweight 57 kg	(China) Ze Lang Zha Xi	def.	(China) Liang Hui	Decision (Unanimous)	3	5:00	
Catchweight 71.8 kg	(China) Luo Chao	def.	(China) Zhao Jun Chen	Decision (Split)	3	3:00	Kickboxing
Flyweight 61 kg	(China) Yang Hua	def.	(China) Wei Zi Qin	Decision (Split)	3	3:00	Kickboxing
Flyweight 61 kg	(China) Wang Zhen	def.	(China) Zou Jin Bo	Decision (Split)	3	5:00	
Lightweight 77 kg	(China) Fu Kang Kang	def.	(China) Wang Hu	Submission (Rear-Naked Choke)	2	3:29	

== ONE Hero Series 14 ==
ONE Hero Series 14
- Promotion: ONE Championship
- Date: June 21, 2020
- City: Shanghai, China
- Attendance: None (behind closed doors)

ONE Hero Series 14 was a combat sport event held by ONE Championship on June 21, 2020, in Shanghai, China.

=== Results ===
ONE Hero Series 14
Weight Class				Method	Round	Time	Notes
Catchweight 72 kg	(China) Xu Liu	def.	(China) Zhao Xiao Yu	Decision (Unanimous)	3	3:00	Kickboxing
Featherweight 70 kg	(China) Zhu Kang Jie	def.	(China) Ayijiake Akenbieke	Decision (Unanimous)	3	5:00	
Bantamweight 66 kg	(China) Fu Qing Nan	def.	(China) Yuan Peng Bin	Decision (Split)	3	3:00	Kickboxing
Lightweight 77 kg	(China) Zhang Ze Hao	def.	(China) Gao Bo	TKO (Punches)	1	3:43	
Strawweight 57 kg	(China) Li Zhe	def.	(China) Mo Hao Xiong	Submission (Rear-Naked Choke)	1	3:16	

== ONE Championship: No Surrender ==
ONE Championship: No Surrender
- Promotion: ONE Championship
- Date: July 31, 2020
- Venue: IMPACT Arena
- City: Bangkok, Thailand
- Attendance: None (behind closed doors)

ONE Championship: No Surrender (also known as ONE Championship 110) was a combat sport event held by ONE Championship on July 31, 2020, at the IMPACT Arena in Bangkok, Thailand.

=== Background ===
ONE: No Surrender featured two title bouts: Rodtang Jitmuangnon was scheduled to defend the ONE Flyweight Muay Thai World Championship against Petchdam Petchyindee Academy and Phetmorakot Petchyindee Academy was scheduled to defend the ONE Featherweight Muay Thai World Championship against Yodsanklai Fairtex.

The main card also featured a kickboxing superfight between Superbon Banchamek and Sitthichai Sitsongpeenong.

=== Results ===
ONE: No Surrender
Weight Class				Method	Round	Time	Notes
Flyweight 61 kg	(Thailand) Rodtang Jitmuangnon (c)	def.	(Thailand) Petchdam Petchyindee Academy	Decision (Majority)	5	3:00	For the ONE Flyweight Muay Thai World Championship
Featherweight 70 kg	(Thailand) Phetmorakot Petchyindee Academy (c)	def.	(Thailand) Yodsanklai Fairtex	Decision (Majority)	5	3:00	For the ONE Featherweight Muay Thai World Championship
Featherweight 70 kg	(Thailand) Superbon Banchamek	def.	(Thailand) Sitthichai Sitsongpeenong	Decision (Unanimous)	3	3:00	Kickboxing
Atomweight 52 kg	(Thailand) Stamp Fairtex	def.	(Thailand) Sunisa Srisen	TKO (Punches)	1	3:57	
Catchweight 67 kg	(Brazil) Fabrício Andrade	def.	(Australia) Mark Abelardo	Submission (Rear-Naked Choke)	2	1:11	
Flyweight 61 kg	(Thailand) Superlek Kiatmuu9	def.	(Thailand) Panpayak Jitmuangnon	Decision (Unanimous)	3	3:00	Muay Thai

== ONE Championship: No Surrender 2 ==
ONE Championship: No Surrender 2
- Promotion: ONE Championship
- Date: July 31, 2020 (aired August 14, 2020)
- Venue: IMPACT Arena
- City: Bangkok, Thailand
- Attendance: None (behind closed doors)

ONE Championship: No Surrender 2 (also known as ONE Championship 111) was a combat sport event held by ONE Championship on July 31, 2020, at the IMPACT Arena in Bangkok, Thailand. It was first broadcast on August 14, 2020.

=== Background ===
The Bantamweight Muay Thai Tournament Semi-Finals bout between Saemapetch Fairtex and Rodlek P.K. Saenchaimuaythaigym was scheduled as the main event for ONE: No Surrender 2.

In the co-main event, the former WBC Muaythai and World Muaythai Council champion Mehdi Zatout was scheduled to fight Victor Pinto.

Bonus awards

The following fighter was awarded bonus:

- Knockout of the Night: Akihiro Fujisawa

=== Results ===
ONE: No Surrender 2
Weight Class				Method	Round	Time	Notes
Bantamweight 66 kg	(Thailand) Saemapetch Fairtex	def.	(Thailand) Rodlek P.K. Saenchaimuaythaigym	Decision (Majority)	3	3:00	Bantamweight Muay Thai Tournament Semi-Finals
Bantamweight 66 kg	(France) Mehdi Zatout	def.	(France) Victor Pinto	Decision (Unanimous)	3	3:00	Kickboxing
Catchweight 59.5 kg	(Japan) Akihiro Fujisawa	def.	(Thailand) Pongsiri Mitsatit	KO (Punch)	1	4:55	
Featherweight 70 kg	(Thailand) Sorgraw Petchyindee	def.	(Thailand) Pongsiri P.K.Saenchaimuaythaigym	Decision (Split)	3	3:00	Muay Thai
Flyweight 61 kg	(Thailand) Yodkaikaew Fairtex	def.	(England) John Shink	KO (Punches)	2	1:11	
Flyweight 61 kg	(Tunisia) Fahdi Khaled	def.	(China) Huang Ding	Decision (Unanimous)	3	3:00	Muay Thai

== ONE Championship: No Surrender 3 ==
ONE Championship: No Surrender 3
- Promotion: ONE Championship
- Date: July 31, 2020 (aired August 21, 2020)
- Venue: IMPACT Arena
- City: Bangkok, Thailand
- Attendance: None (behind closed doors)

ONE Championship: No Surrender 3 (also known as ONE Championship 112) was a combat sport event held by ONE Championship on July 31, 2020, at the IMPACT Arena in Bangkok, Thailand. It was first broadcast on August 21, 2020.

=== Background ===
Bonus awards

The following fighter was awarded bonus:

- Knockout of the Night: Kulabdam Sor.Jor.Piek-U-Thai

=== Results ===
ONE: No Surrender 3
Weight Class				Method	Round	Time	Notes
Bantamweight 66 kg	(Thailand) Kulabdam Sor.Jor.Piek-U-Thai	def.	(Thailand) Sangmanee Sor Tienpo	KO (Punch)	1	2:45	Bantamweight Muay Thai Tournament Semi-Finals
Flyweight 61 kg	(Thailand) Mongkolpetch Petchyindee	def.	(Cambodia) Sok Thy	Decision (Unanimous)	3	3:00	Muay Thai
Featherweight 70 kg	(Thailand) Shannon Wiratchai	def.	(France) Fabio Pinca	Decision (Split)	3	5:00	
W.Strawweight 57 kg	(Thailand) Nat Jaroonsak	def.	(Australia) Brooke Farrell	KO (Headkick and Punches)	1	1:21	Muay Thai
W.Atomweight 52 kg	(Estonia) Marie Ruumet	def.	(Japan) Ayaka Miyauchi	Decision (Unanimous)	3	3:00	Muay Thai
Featherweight 70 kg	(England) Ben Royle	def.	(United States) Quitin Thomas	TKO (Punches)	3	3:27	

== ONE Championship: A New Breed ==
ONE Championship: A New Breed
- Promotion: ONE Championship
- Date: August 28, 2020
- Venue: IMPACT Arena
- City: Bangkok, Thailand
- Attendance: None (behind closed doors)

ONE Championship: A New Breed (also known as ONE Championship 113) was a combat sport event held by ONE Championship on August 28, 2020, at the IMPACT Arena in Bangkok, Thailand.

=== Background ===
This will be the fourth consecutive event ONE Championship has held in Bangkok and will be headlined by a bout between the current Atomweight Muay Thai champion Stamp Fairtex and Allycia Rodrigues. Additionally, Kulabdam Sor.Jor.Piek-U-Thai was expected to fight Saemapetch Fairtex, however Saemapetch suffered an injury before the bout and was replaced by Rodlek P.K. Saenchaimuaythaigym.

=== Results ===
ONE: A New Breed
Weight Class				Method	Round	Time	Notes
W.Atomweight 52 kg	(Brazil) Allycia Rodrigues	def.	(Thailand) Stamp Fairtex	Decision (Majority)	5	3:00	For the ONE Women's Atomweight Muay Thai World Championship
Bantamweight 66 kg	(Thailand) Rodlek P.K. Saenchaimuaythaigym	def.	(Thailand) Kulabdam Sor.Jor.Piek-U-Thai	Decision (Unanimous)	3	3:00	Bantamweight Muay Thai Tournament Final
W.Atomweight 52 kg	(Philippines) Denice Zamboanga	def.	(Thailand) Watsyapinya Kaewkhong	Submission (Americana)	1	1:28	
W.Strawweight 57 kg	(Thailand) Nat Jaroonsak	def.	(United States) KC Carlos	TKO (Doctor Stoppage)	2	1:06	Muay Thai
Flyweight 61 kg	(Philippines) Drex Zamboanga	def.	(Thailand) Detchadin Sorsirisuphathin	Submission (Rear-Naked Choke)	2	4:58	
Flyweight 61 kg	(Cambodia) Sok Thy	def.	(China) Huang Ding	KO (Punch to the Body)	1	2:52	Muay Thai
Flyweight 61 kg	(Thailand) Yodkaikaew Fairtex	def.	(United States) Alex Schild	TKO (Leg Kicks)	3	1:21	

== Road to ONE: Tokyo Fight Night 3 ==
Road to ONE: Tokyo Fight Night 3
- Promotion: ONE Championship
- Date: September 10, 2020
- Venue: Tsutaya O-East
- City: Tokyo, Japan

Road to ONE 3: Tokyo Fight Night was a combat sport event held by ONE Championship in partnership with Shooto on September 10, 2020, at the Tsutaya O-East in Tokyo, Japan.

=== Results ===
Road to ONE 3
Weight Class				Method	Round	Time	Notes
Lightweight 77 kg	(Japan) Shinya Aoki	def.	(Japan) Kimihiro Eto	Decision (Unanimous)	3	5:00	
Strawweight 57 kg	(Japan) Yosuke Saruta	def.	(Japan) Yoshitaka Naito	Decision (Unanimous)	3	5:00	
Welterweight 84 kg	(Japan) Hiroyuki Tetsuka	def.	(Democratic Republic of the Congo) Gunther Kalunda Ngunza	TKO (Punches)	1	1:14	
Bantamweight 66 kg	(Japan) Yuta Nezu	def.	(Japan) Masakazu Imanari	Decision (Unanimous)	3	5:00	
Strawweight 57 kg	(Japan) Asahi Shinagawa	def.	(Japan) KING Kyosuke	Decision (Unanimous)	3	3:00	Muay Thai
Strawweight 57 kg	(Japan) Arii Shoa	def.	(Japan) Naoya Kuroda	KO (Knee to the body)	2		Kickboxing

== ONE Championship: A New Breed 2 ==
ONE Championship: A New Breed 2
- Promotion: ONE Championship
- Date: August 28, 2020 (aired September 11, 2020)
- Venue: IMPACT Arena
- City: Bangkok, Thailand
- Attendance: None (behind closed doors)

ONE Championship: A New Breed 2 (also known as ONE Championship 114) was a combat sport event held by ONE Championship on August 28, 2020, at the IMPACT Arena in Bangkok, Thailand. It was first broadcast on September 11, 2020.

=== Background ===
A fight between the former ONE Muay Thai Featherweight title challenger Pongsiri PK.Saenchaimuaythaigym and the current WBC Muaythai Super Lightweight champion Sean Clancy was announced as the main event.

A kickboxing bout between Superlek Kiatmuu9 and Fahdi Khaled was announced as the co-main event. An additional fight in the ONE Super Series will feature Supergirl Jaroonsak Muaythai and Milagros Lopez at 53.7 kg catchweight. Two mixed martial arts bouts at lightweight (77 kg) were announced, pitting Abu Muslim Alikhanov vs. Pascal Jaskiewiez and Witchayakorn Niamthanom vs. Khalid Friggini. A 67.5 kg catchweight mixed martial arts fight between Prach Buapa and Brogan Stewart-Ng was announced as well.

=== Results ===
ONE: A New Breed 2
Weight Class				Method	Round	Time	Notes
Bantamweight 66 kg	(Thailand) Pongsiri P.K.Saenchaimuaythaigym	def.	(Republic of Ireland) Sean Clancy	Decision (Unanimous)	3	3:00	Muay Thai
Flyweight 61 kg	(Thailand) Superlek Kiatmuu9	def.	(Tunisia) Fahdi Khaled	Decision (Unanimous)	3	3:00	Kickboxing
W.Catchweight 53.7 kg	(Thailand) Supergirl Jaroonsak MuayThai	def.	(Argentina) Milagros Lopez	TKO (Punches)	1	1:00	Muay Thai
Catchweight 67.5 kg	(Australia) Brogan Stewart-Ng	def.	(Thailand) Prach Buapa	Submission (Rear-Naked Choke)	1	3:51	
Lightweight 77 kg	(Russia) Abu Muslim Alikhanov	def.	(France) Pascal Jaskiewiez	Submission (Leg lock)	2	2:08	
Lightweight 77 kg	(Thailand) Witchayakorn Niamthanom	def.	(Morocco) Khalid Friggini	Submission (Rear-Naked Choke)	1	2:11	

== ONE Championship: A New Breed 3 ==
ONE Championship: A New Breed 3
- Promotion: ONE Championship
- Date: August 28, 2020 (aired September 18, 2020)
- Venue: IMPACT Arena
- City: Bangkok, Thailand
- Attendance: None (behind closed doors)

ONE Championship: A New Breed 3 (also known as ONE Championship 115) was a combat sport event held by ONE Championship on August 28, 2020, at the IMPACT Arena in Bangkok, Thailand. It was first broadcast on September 18, 2020.

=== Results ===
ONE: A New Breed 3
Weight Class				Method	Round	Time	Notes
Featherweight 70 kg	(Thailand) Phetmorakot Petchyindee Academy	def.	(Sweden) Magnus Andersson	TKO (Punches)	3	2:57	For the ONE Featherweight Muay Thai World Championship
Bantamweight 66 kg	(Thailand) Capitan Petchyindee Academy	def.	(Thailand) Petchtanong Banchamek	KO (Punch)	1	0:06	Kickboxing
W.Atomweight 52 kg	(Thailand) Sunisa Srisen	def.	(Thailand) Rika Ishige	Decision (Unanimous)	3	5:00	
Bantamweight 66 kg	(Brazil) Felipe Lobo	def.	(Thailand) Yodpanomrung Jitmuangnon	Decision (Split)	3	3:00	Muay Thai
Featherweight 70 kg	(Russia) Yurik Davtyan	def.	(Thailand) Bangpleenoi Petchyindee Academy	KO (Punches)	2	0:07	Muay Thai

== ONE Championship: Reign of Dynasties ==
ONE Championship: Reign of Dynasties
- Promotion: ONE Championship
- Date: October 9, 2020
- Venue: Singapore Indoor Stadium
- City: Singapore
- Attendance: None (behind closed doors)

ONE Championship: Reign of Dynasties (also known as ONE Championship 116) was a combat sport event held by ONE Championship on October 9, 2020, at the Singapore Indoor Stadium in Kallang, Singapore.

=== Background ===
ONE: ‘Reign of Dynasties’ will be headlined by a title fight between the current ONE Strawweight Muay Thai World Champion Sam-A Gaiyanghadao and Josh Tonna, who is currently on a two fight win streak. The card will also feature an MMA bout between the undefeated prospect Aleksi Toivonen, and the #5 ranked flyweight Reece McLaren.

Former ONE Strawweight champion Dejdamrong Sor Amnuaysirichoke is scheduled to have his first fight of 2020 against Getu Hexi.

This event marks ONE's return to Singapore, for the first time since the beginning of the COVID-19 pandemic.

=== Results ===
ONE: Reign of Dynasties
Weight Class				Method	Round	Time	Notes
Strawweight 57 kg	(Thailand) Sam-A Gaiyanghadao (c)	def.	(Australia) Josh Tonna	TKO (3 Knockdown Rule)	2	2:30	For the ONE Strawweight Muay Thai World Championship
Flyweight 61 kg	(Australia) Reece McLaren	def.	(Finland) Aleksi Toivonen	KO (Knee to the Body)	1	4:18	
Lightweight 77 kg	(Singapore) Amir Khan	def.	(India) Rahul Raju	KO (Punches)	1	4:47	
Catchweight 63.5 kg	(Indonesia) Eko Roni Saputra	def.	(Malaysia) Murugan Silvarajoo	Submission (Shoulder Lock)	1	2:29	
Strawweight 57 kg	(China) Hexigetu	def.	(Thailand) Dejdamrong Sor Amnuaysirichoke	Decision (Split)	3	5:00	
Flyweight 61 kg	(India) Roshan Mainam	def.	(China) Liu Peng Shua	Submission (Rear-Naked Choke)	2	2:27	

== ONE Championship: Reign of Dynasties 2 ==
ONE Championship: Reign of Dynasties 2
- Promotion: ONE Championship
- Date: October 9, 2020 (aired October 16, 2020)
- Venue: Singapore Indoor Stadium
- City: Singapore
- Attendance: None (behind closed doors)

ONE Championship: Reign of Dynasties 2 (also known as ONE Championship 117) was a combat sport event held by ONE Championship on October 9, 2020, at the Singapore Indoor Stadium in Kallang, Singapore. It was first broadcast on October 16, 2020.

=== Background ===
ONE: Reign of Dynasties 2 will be headlined by a kickboxing bout between Hiroki Akimoto and Zhang Chenglong. The co-main event will feature a fight between the former three weight Lumpini Stadium champion Sagetdao Petpayathai and Zhang Chunyu.

=== results ===
ONE: Reign of Dynasties 2
Weight Class				Method	Round	Time	Notes
Bantamweight 66 kg	(Japan) Hiroki Akimoto	def.	(China) Zhang Chenglong	Decision (Split)	3	3:00	Kickboxing
Featherweight 70 kg	(Thailand) Sagetdao Petpayathai	def.	(China) Zhang Chunyu	Decision (Unanimous)	3	3:00	Muay Thai
Featherweight 70 kg	(China) Tang Kai	def.	(Malaysia) Keanu Subba	Decision (Unanimous)	3	5:00	
Flyweight 61 kg	(China) Wang Wenfeng	def.	(Malaysia) Azwan Che Wil	Decision (Unanimous)	3	3:00	Muay Thai
Strawweight 57 kg	(Japan) Ryuto Sawada	def.	(China) Miao Li Tao	Decision (Unanimous)	3	5:00	
Bantamweight 66 kg	(China) Han Zihao	def.	(Malaysia) Mohammed Bin Mahmoud	TKO (Punches)	3	0:49	Muay Thai

== ONE Championship: Inside the Matrix ==
ONE Championship: Inside the Matrix
- Promotion: ONE Championship
- Date: October 30, 2020
- Venue: Singapore Indoor Stadium
- City: Singapore
- Attendance: 250

ONE Championship: Inside the Matrix (also known as ONE Championship 118: N Sang vs. De Ridder) was a combat sport event held by ONE Championship on October 30, 2020, at the Singapore Indoor Stadium in Kallang, Singapore.

=== Background ===
ONE Championship CEO Chatri Sityodtong announced, four weeks before the event, that "Inside the Matrix" would feature four title bouts: Aung La Nsang would attempt to defend his Middleweight title for the fourth time against the undefeated Reinier de Ridder, Christian Lee would defend his Lightweight title for the first time against the undefeated prospect Iuri Lapicus, Martin Nguyen would defend his Featherweight title against Thanh Le, and Xiong Jingnan would defend her Strawweight strap in rematch with Tiffany Teo.

The event will be third in a row to take place in Singapore, following the relaxation of measures meant to combat the COVID-19 pandemic.

Former ONE Lightweight champion Eduard Folayang is scheduled to fight Antonio Caruso. Both fighters have most recently lost to Pieter Buist.

A women's atomweight bout between Ritu Phogat and Nou Srey Pov was announced as the sixth fight on the card.

=== Results ===
ONE: Inside the Matrix
Weight Class				Method	Round	Time	Notes
Middleweight 93 kg	(Netherlands) Reinier de Ridder	def.	(Myanmar) Aung La Nsang (c)	Submission (Rear-Naked Choke)	1	3:26	For the ONE Middleweight World Championship
Lightweight 77 kg	(Canada) Christian Lee (c)	def.	(Moldova) Iuri Lapicus	TKO (Punches)	1	2:19	For the ONE Lightweight World Championship
Featherweight 70 kg	(United States) Thanh Le	def.	(Australia) Martin Nguyen (c)	TKO (Punches)	3	2:19	For the ONE Featherweight World Championship
Strawweight 56.7 kg	(China) Xiong Jingnan (c)	def.	(Singapore) Tiffany Teo	Decision (Unanimous)	5	5:00	For the ONE Women's Strawweight World Championship
Lightweight 77 kg	(Australia) Antonio Caruso	def.	(Philippines) Eduard Folayang	Decision (Unanimous)	3	5:00	
Atomweight 52 kg	(India) Ritu Phogat	def.	(Cambodia) Nou Srey Pov	TKO (Punches)	2	2:02	

== ONE Championship: Inside the Matrix 2 ==
ONE Championship: Inside the Matrix 2
- Promotion: ONE Championship
- Date: October 30, 2020 (aired November 6, 2020)
- Venue: Singapore Indoor Stadium
- City: Singapore
- Attendance: 250

ONE Championship: Inside the Matrix 2 (also known as ONE Championship 119) was a combat sport event held by ONE Championship on October 30, 2020, at the Singapore Indoor Stadium in Kallang, Singapore. It was first broadcast on November 6, 2020.

=== Background ===
ONE: Inside the Matrix 2 will be headlined by a welterweight title fight, as the reigning champion Kiamrian Abbasov is scheduled to defend his title for the first time against James Nakashima.

In the co-main event, the #4 ranked lightweight Timofey Nastyukhin will face the #3 ranked Pieter Buist.

In the remaining three MMA matches, the #4 ranked flyweight Yuya Wakamatsu is scheduled to fight Kim Kyu Sung, Eko Roni Saputra is scheduled to fight Ramon Gonzales, likewise at flyweight. The #2 ranked women's atomweight Meng Bo will face Priscilla Gaol.

A catchweight muay thai bout between Joseph Lasiri and Rocky Ogden was previously scheduled for ONE: Inside the Matrix 2.However, on November 4, the bout was removed from the card and the bout was rescheduled to a future card.

=== Results ===
ONE: Inside the Matrix 2
Weight Class				Method	Round	Time	Notes
Welterweight 84 kg	(Kyrgyzstan) Kiamrian Abbasov (c)	def.	(United States) James Nakashima	TKO (Knee and Punches)	4	3:27	For the ONE Welterweight World Championship
Lightweight 77 kg	(Russia) Timofey Nastyukhin	def.	(Netherlands) Pieter Buist	Decision (Unanimous)	3	5:00	
Flyweight 61 kg	(Japan) Yuya Wakamatsu	def.	(South Korea) Kim Kyu Sung	KO (Punches)	1	1:46	
Flyweight 61 kg	(Indonesia) Eko Roni Saputra	def.	(Philippines) Ramon Gonzales	Submission (Rear-Naked Choke)	1	4:07	
W.Atomweight 52 kg	(China) Meng Bo	def.	(Indonesia) Priscilla Gaol	KO (Punches)	1	1:26	

== ONE Championship: Inside the Matrix 3 ==
ONE Championship: Inside the Matrix 3
- Promotion: ONE Championship
- Date: October 30, 2020 (aired November 13, 2020)
- Venue: Singapore Indoor Stadium
- City: Singapore
- Attendance: 250

ONE Championship: Inside the Matrix 3 (also known as ONE Championship 120) was a combat sport event held by ONE Championship on October 30, 2020, at the Singapore Indoor Stadium in Kallang, Singapore. It was first broadcast on November 13, 2020.

=== Background ===
Former ONE Bantamweight champion Kevin Belingon is scheduled to fight the #5 ranked bantamweight John Lineker. The fight will serve as the event headliner.

In the co-main, former ONE Flyweight champion Geje Eustaquio is scheduled to fight the former Road FC interim flyweight champion Min Jong Song. A middleweight bout between Murad Ramazanov and Hiroyuki Tetsuka was announced, as well as a flyweight bout between the #5 ranked Lito Adiwang and Hiroba Minowa. Two time ADCC champion Yuri Simões will fight Fan Rong.

=== results ===
ONE: Inside the Matrix 3
Weight Class				Method	Round	Time	Notes
Bantamweight 66 kg	(Brazil) John Lineker	def.	(Philippines) Kevin Belingon	TKO (Punches)	2	1:16	
Catchweight 64 kg	(Philippines) Geje Eustaquio	def.	(South Korea) Min Jong Song	Decision (Unanimous)	3	5:00	
Welterweight 84 kg	(Russia) Murad Ramazanov	def.	(Japan) Hiroyuki Tetsuka	Decision (Unanimous)	3	5:00	
Middleweight 93 kg	(China) Fan Rong	def.	(Brazil) Yuri Simões	Decision (Unanimous)	3	5:00	
Strawweight 57 kg	(Japan) Hiroba Minowa	def.	(Philippines) Lito Adiwang	Decision (Split)	3	5:00	

== ONE Championship: Inside the Matrix 4 ==
ONE Championship: Inside the Matrix 4
- Promotion: ONE Championship
- Date: October 30, 2020 (aired November 20, 2020)
- Venue: Singapore Indoor Stadium
- City: Singapore
- Attendance: 250

ONE Championship: Inside the Matrix 4 (also known as ONE Championship 121) was a combat sport event held by ONE Championship on October 30, 2020, at the Singapore Indoor Stadium in Kallang, Singapore. It was first broadcast on November 20, 2020.

=== Background ===
ONE: Inside the Matrix 4 was headlined by a kickboxing bout between the former ONE Kickboxing Strawweight title challenger Wang Junguang and Aslanbek Zikreev.

In the co-main event, Joseph Lasiri fought Rocky Ogden. Bruno Pucci returned from a year long layoff to face Kwon Won Il.

Former Shooto Featherweight champion Ryogo Takahashi fought the undefeated prospect Yoon Chang Min. The sole WMMA bout saw Maira Mazar face Choi Jeong Yun. Although Choi was undefeated, it was her first fight in over three years.

=== Results ===
ONE: Inside the Matrix 4
Weight Class				Method	Round	Time	Notes
Catchweight 58.3 kg	(Russia) Aslanbek Zikreev	def.	(China) Wang Junguang	Decision (Split)	3	3:00	Kickboxing
Catchweight 59 kg	(Italy) Joseph Lasiri	def.	(Australia) Rocky Ogden	Decision (Split)	3	3:00	Muay Thai
Bantamweight 66 kg	(South Korea) Kwon Won Il	def.	(Brazil) Bruno Pucci	TKO (Punches)	1	2:00	
Featherweight 70 kg	(Japan) Ryogo Takahashi	def.	(South Korea) Yoon Chang Min	TKO (Punches)	2	2:52	
W.Catchweight 61.3 kg	(Brazil) Maira Mazar	def.	(South Korea) Choi Jeong Yun	TKO (Punches)	3	4:26	

== Road to ONE: Fair Fight 13 ==
Road to ONE: Fair Fight 13
- Promotion: ONE Championship
- Date: November 28, 2020
- Venue: Akademiya Yedinoborstv Rmk
- City: Yekaterinburg, Russia

Road to ONE: Fair Fight 13 was a Kickboxing event held by ONE Championship in partnership with Fair Fight promotion, on November 28, 2020, at the Akademiya Yedinoborstv Rmk in Yekaterinburg, Russia.

=== Background ===
Road to ONE 4 will be ONE Championship's first event held in Russia.

A four-man tournament will be held in the 66 kg weight class, featuring Tamerlan Bashirov, Viktor Mikhailov, Vladimir Kuzmin and Maxim Petkevich.

Sher Mamazulunov is scheduled to fight Dmitry Valent in a kickboxing bout at 84 kg.

=== Results ===
Road to ONE 4
Weight Class				Method	Round	Time	Notes
Bantamweight 66 kg	(Russia) Vladimir Kuzmin	def.	(Russia) Tamerlan Bashirov	Decision (Unanimous)	3	3:00	Road to ONE Kickboxing Bantamweight Tournament Final
Welterweight 84 kg	(Russia) Sher Mamazulunov	def.	(Belarus) Dmitry Valent	Ext.R Decision (Unanimous)	4	3:00	Kickboxing
Welterweight 84 kg	(Russia) Sergey Ponomarev	def.	(Russia) Mikhail Sartakov	Decision (Unanimous)	3	3:00	Kickboxing
Featherweight 70 kg	(Russia) Salimkhan Ibragimov	def.	(Russia) Nikita Gerasimovich	Decision (Unanimous)	3	3:00	Kickboxing
Catchweight 67 kg	(Russia) Kirill Khomutov	def.	(Uzbekistan) Mavlud Tifiev	Decision (Split)	3	3:00	Kickboxing
Catchweight 68 kg	(Russia) Nikita Kurbatov	def.	(Russia) Dmitriy Lunyachenko	Decision (Unanimous)	3	3:00	Kickboxing
Catchweight 75 kg	(Russia) Ilya Sokolov	def.	(Russia) Denis Burmatov	KO (Head Kick)	3	1:11	Kickboxing
Middleweight 93 kg	(Russia) Valeriy Bizyayev	def.	(Russia) Usman Yakhiev	KO (Punches)	2	1:55	Kickboxing
Bantamweight 66 kg	(Belarus) Oleg Likhtarovich	def.	(Russia) Ivan Avdeev	Decision (Unanimous)	3	3:00	Road to ONE Kickboxing Bantamweight Tournament Reserve Fight
Bantamweight 66 kg	(Russia) Tamerlan Bashirov	def.	(Russia) Viktor Mikhailov	Decision (Split)	3	3:00	Road to ONE Kickboxing Bantamweight Tournament Semi-Finals
Bantamweight 66 kg	(Russia) Vladimir Kuzmin	def.	(Belarus) Maxim Petkevich	Decision (Unanimous)	3	3:00	Road to ONE Kickboxing Bantamweight Tournament Semi-Finals
Welterweight 84 kg	(Russia) Nikita Kozlov	def.	(Russia) Nikita Radyakin	Decision (Unanimous)	3	3:00	Kickboxing
Featherweight 70 kg	(Russia) Eduar Fatykov	def.	(Russia) Vadim Davydov	Decision (Unanimous)	3	3:00	Kickboxing
Catchweight 75 kg	(Russia) Igor Kurganskiy	def.	(Russia) Saadula Tsarainov	Decision (Unanimous)	3	3:00	Kickboxing

== ONE Championship: Big Bang ==
ONE Championship: Big Bang
- Promotion: ONE Championship
- Date: December 4, 2020
- Venue: Singapore Indoor Stadium
- City: Singapore

ONE Championship: Big Bang (also known as ONE Championship 122) was a combat sport event held by ONE Championship on December 4, 2020, at the Singapore Indoor Stadium in Kallang, Singapore.

=== Background ===
ONE: Big Bang will be headlined by a featherweight kickboxing bout between Marat Grigorian and Ivan Kondratev.

The #5 ranked featherweight Garry Tonon is scheduled to fight the former ONE Featherweight title challenger Koyomi Matsushima.

Former Glory lightweight champion Marat Grigorian is scheduled to fight Ivan Kondratev, in his debut with the organization.

In the sole WMMA bout, Ritu Phogat is scheduled to fight Jomary Torres.

A Heavyweight bout between newcomer Amir Aliakbari and Islam Abasov was previously scheduled for ONE: Big Bang. However, on November 25, the bout was removed from the card because Abasov was arrested and detained in Moscow after a road conflict.

Danny Kingad was scheduled to face Kairat Akhmatov, but Kingad was forced off the card on November 30 after one of his cornermen tested positive for COVID-19. The bout has been scrapped.

As a number of fighters withdrew, several changes took place on the card. The featherweight matchup between Marat Grigorian and Ivan Kondratev was promoted to the main event. Anderson Silva replaced Roman Kryklia as Murat Aygun's opponent, and a featherweight fight between Andy Souwer and Zhang Chunyu was added. A women's atomweight MMA bout between Jihin Radzuan and Bi Nguyen was later added as well.

Roman Kryklia was scheduled to defend his ONE Kickboxing Light Heavyweight title against promotional newcomer Murat Aygün in the ONE championship: Big Bang Headliner, but Kryklia has to withdraw from the bout when one of his coaches tested positive for COVID.Anderson Silva was pulled from a planned ONE Championship: Big Bang 2 bout with Masoud Safari, and faced Aygün on the ONE Championship: Big Bang card.

=== Results ===
ONE: Big Bang
Weight Class				Method	Round	Time	Notes
Featherweight 70 kg	(Armenia) Marat Grigorian	def.	(Russia) Ivan Kondratev	KO (Punch to the Body)	2	1:52	Kickboxing
Featherweight 70 kg	(United States) Garry Tonon	def.	(Japan) Koyomi Matsushima	Decision (Unanimous)	3	5:00	
Light Heavyweight 102 kg	(Turkey) Murat Aygün	def.	(Brazil) Anderson Silva	Decision (Unanimous)	3	3:00	Kickboxing
Featherweight 70 kg	(Netherlands) Andy Souwer	def.	(China) Zhang Chunyu	Decision (Unanimous)	3	3:00	Kickboxing
Strawweight 57 kg	(South Africa) Bokang Masunyane	def.	(Philippines) Rene Catalan	KO (Head Kick)	1	0:37	
Atomweight 52 kg	(Malaysia) Jihin Radzuan	def.	(Vietnam) Bi Nguyen	Decision (Unanimous)	3	5:00	
Atomweight 52 kg	(India) Ritu Phogat	def.	(Philippines) Jomary Torres	TKO (Elbows)	1	3:55	

== ONE Championship: Big Bang 2 ==
ONE Championship: Big Bang 2
- Promotion: ONE Championship
- Date: December 4, 2020 (aired December 11, 2020)
- Venue: Singapore Indoor Stadium
- City: Singapore

ONE Championship: Big Bang 2 (also known as ONE Championship 123) was a combat sport event held by ONE Championship on December 4, 2020, at the Singapore Indoor Stadium in Kallang, Singapore. It was first broadcast on December 11, 2020.

=== Background ===
ONE: Big Bang 2 will be headlined by a Muay Thai fight between Taiki Naito and Jonathan Haggerty. In the co-main event, Nieky Holzken will return from a year long layoff to take on Elliot Compton.

Errol Zimmerman returns from a two-year hiatus from kickboxing to fight Rade Opacic. In the remaining MMA bouts, Tetsuya Yamada is scheduled to fight Kim Jae Woong, and Ali Motamed will fight Chen Rui.

Masoud Safari was scheduled to face Anderson Silva, but was removed from the card when Silva stepped up to face Aygün on ONE Championship: Big Bang card.

A welterweight fight between Agilan Thani and Tyler McGuire was later added.

=== Results ===
ONE: Big Bang 2
Weight Class				Method	Round	Time	Notes
Flyweight 61 kg	(England) Jonathan Haggerty	def.	(Japan) Taiki Naito	Decision (Unanimous)	3	3:00	Muay Thai
Lightweight 77 kg	(Netherlands) Nieky Holzken	def.	(Australia) Elliot Compton	KO (Punch to the Body)	1	1:36	Kickboxing
Featherweight 70 kg	(South Korea) Kim Jae Woong	def.	(Japan) Tetsuya Yamada	TKO (Punches)	2	4:39	
Heavyweight 120 kg	(Serbia) Rade Opacic	def.	(Netherlands) Errol Zimmerman	TKO (Spinning Heel Kick)	2	1:35	Kickboxing
Welterweight 84 kg	(United States) Tyler Mcguire	def.	(Malaysia) Agilan Thani	Decision (Unanimous)	3	5:00	
Bantamweight 66 kg	(China) Chen Rui	def.	(Iran) Ali Motamed	TKO (Punches)	1	1:56	

== Road to ONE: World Siam Stadium ==
Road to ONE: World Siam Stadium
- Promotion: ONE Championship
- Date: December 7, 2020
- Venue: World Siam Stadium
- City: Bangkok, Thailand

Road to ONE 5: WSS was a Muay Thai event held by ONE Championship in partnership with World Siam Stadium (WSS) on December 7, 2020, at the World Siam Stadium in Bangkok, Thailand.

=== Background ===
The event will be headlined by a fight between the reigning Rajadamnern Stadium 126 lb champion Petchpangan Teeded99 and Wanchana Nor Narisson. They have met on two previous occasions, with each fighter winning once.

=== Results ===
Road to ONE 5
Weight Class				Method	Round	Time	Notes
Catchweight 59 kg	(Thailand) Petchpangan Tded99	–	(Thailand) Wanchana Nor Narissorn	No Contest (Accidental Low Blow)	3	3:00	Muay Thai
Catchweight 68 kg	(Thailand) Yodsanchai Nayok-A Thasala	def.	(Thailand) Roylan Warriormuaythai	KO (Elbow)	3	1:30	Muay Thai
Atomweight 52 kg	(Thailand) Nongchamp Suanarhanpeekmai	def.	(Thailand) Kongboorapha Thipthamai	Decision (Unanimous)	5	3:00	Muay Thai
Strawweight 57 kg	(Thailand) Kaensak Sor Tienpo	def.	(Thailand) Patakngern Pakbangkhakhaw	TKO (Shoulder Injury)	5	1:58	Muay Thai
Postliminary Card
Strawweight 57 kg	(Brazil) Noelisson Phuketfightclub	def.	(Thailand) Thor Kor Sor Sor Chokmeechai	Decision (Unanimous)	5	3:00	Muay Thai
Atomweight 52 kg	(Thailand) Watcharaphol Singmawin	def.	(Thailand) Wutthidet Tded99	Decision (Majority)	5	3:00	Muay Thai

== ONE Championship: Collision Course ==
ONE Championship: Collision Course
- Promotion: ONE Championship
- Date: December 18, 2020
- Venue: Singapore Indoor Stadium
- City: Singapore

ONE Championship: Collision Course (also known as ONE Championship 124) was a combat sport event held by ONE Championship on December 18, 2020, at the Singapore Indoor Stadium in Kallang, Singapore.

=== Background ===
A ONE Light Heavyweight Kickboxing World Championship bout between current champion Roman Kryklia and former SUPERKOMBAT Super Cruiserweight Champion Andrei Stoica was slated to serve as the event headliner. This fight was previously postponed three times in 2020 due to the COVID-19 pandemic.

However, the Ukrainian was rescheduled for this event. On December 9, it is announced that Kryklia will defend his belt against Stoica. The Romanian will finally get his title shot but on short notice. Stoica was announced only 2 weeks before the event and at that time he had cut weight to make 95 kilogram weight class for a fight in Romania.

In the co-main event, the reigning ONE Bantamweight Muay Thai champion Nong-O Gaiyanghadao will defends his title against the ONE Bantamweight Muay Thai Tournament winner Rodlek P.K. Saenchaimuaythaigym.

After a 2 years hiatus the undefeated lightweight contender Lowen Tynanes will make his comeback against the former ONE Featherweight champion Marat Gafurov.

The #3 ranked bantamweight Yusup Saadulaev is scheduled to fight the undefeated Troy Worthen. In the flyweight division, Xie Wei will take on Chan Rothana.

=== Results ===
ONE: Collision Course
Weight Class				Method	Round	Time	Notes
Light Heavyweight 102 kg	(Ukraine) Roman Kryklia (c)	def.	(Romania) Andrei Stoica	Decision (Unanimous)	5	3:00	For the ONE Light Heavyweight Kickboxing World Championship
Bantamweight 66 kg	(Thailand) Nong-O Gaiyanghadao (c)	def.	(Thailand) Rodlek P.K. Saenchaimuaythaigym	KO (Punches)	3	1:13	For the ONE Bantamweight Muay Thai World Championship
Featherweight 70 kg	(Russia) Marat Gafurov	def.	(United States) Lowen Tynanes	Decision (Split)	3	5:00	
Bantamweight 66 kg	(Russia) Yusup Saadulaev	def.	(United States) Troy Worthen	Decision (Unanimous)	3	5:00	
Flyweight 61 kg	(Thailand) Yodkaikaew Fairtex	def.	(Japan) Tatsumitsu Wada	Decision (Split)	3	5:00	
Flyweight 61 kg	(China) Xie Wei	def.	(Cambodia) Chan Rothana	TKO (Punches)	3	1:37	

== ONE Championship: Collision Course 2 ==
ONE Championship: Collision Course 2
- Promotion: ONE Championship
- Date: December 18, 2020 (aired December 25, 2020)
- Venue: Singapore Indoor Stadium
- City: Singapore

ONE Championship: Collision Course 2 (also known as ONE Championship 125) was a combat sport event held by ONE Championship on December 18, 2020, at the Singapore Indoor Stadium in Kallang, Singapore. It was first broadcast on December 25, 2020.

=== Background ===
ONE: Collision Course II will be headlined by a muay thai match between Jamal Yusupov and Samy Sana. In the co-main, the #3 ranked flyweight Kairat Akhmetovi is scheduled to fight Dae Hwan Kim.

=== Results ===
ONE: Collision Course 2
Weight Class				Method	Round	Time	Notes
Featherweight 70 kg	(Russia) Jamal Yusupov	def.	(France) Samy Sana	Decision (Unanimous)	3	3:00	Muay Thai
Catchweight 62.5 kg	(Kazakhstan) Kairat Akhmetov	def.	(South Korea) Dae Hwan Kim	Decision (Unanimous)	3	5:00	
Flyweight 61 kg	(Japan) Kohei Kodera	def.	(Brazil) Walter Goncalves	TKO (Leg Injury)	2	0:30	Muay Thai
Lightweight 77 kg	(South Korea) Dae Sung Park	def.	(Singapore) Amir Khan	Decision (Split)	3	5:00	
Welterweight 84 kg	(Russia) Raimond Magomedaliev	def.	(Brazil) Edson Marques	KO (Punches)	1	1:52	
Catchweight 60 kg	(Japan) Senzo Ikeda	def.	(China) Liang Hui	Decision (Unanimous)	3	5:00	

== Road to ONE 6: WSS (Cancelled) ==
Road to ONE 6: WSS
- Promotion: ONE Championship
- Venue: World Siam Stadium
- City: Bangkok, Thailand

Road to ONE 6: WSS was expected to be a Muay Thai event held by ONE Championship in partnership with World Siam Stadium (WSS) at the World Siam Stadium in Bangkok, Thailand. The event was cancelled due to the COVID-19 pandemic.

=== Background ===
The event was expected to take place at the World Siam Stadium in Bangkok, Thailand on December 25. However, on December 21, the event was cancelled due to the COVID-19 pandemic.

The sixth edition of Road to ONE was supposed to be composed solely of muay thai bouts, the former WBC Muaythai 147 lb champion Luis Cajaiba and the current Lumpinee Stadium 160 lb champion Sorgraw Petchyindee was planned to headline the event.

=== Fight Card ===
Road to ONE 6 (Cancelled)
Weight Class				Method	Round	Time	Notes
Catchweight 68.4 kg	(Brazil) Luis Cajaiba	vs.	(Thailand) Sorgraw Petchyindee				Muay Thai
Catchweight 55 kg	(Thailand) Petchsunthree Jitmuangnon	vs.	(Thailand) Petchthawee Khawhommalitrakluaymai				Muay Thai
Catchweight 55.7 kg	(Thailand) Krasaesin Sor.Tienpo	vs.	(Thailand) Dawnapha Fight Evo 360				Muay Thai
Strawweight 57 kg	(Spain) Carlos Coello	vs.	(Thailand) Paruehutlek Nokjeanladkrabang				Muay Thai
Postliminary Card
Flyweight 61 kg	(Thailand) Petchchatchai Annymuaythai	vs.	(Thailand) Choochoi Sitpakphanang				Muay Thai
Flyweight 61 kg	(Thailand) Suedam Sor.Khongmee	vs.	(Thailand) Pakorn Greatergym				Muay Thai

== See also ==
- 2020 in UFC
- Bellator MMA in 2020
- 2020 in Rizin Fighting Federation
- 2020 in Konfrontacja Sztuk Walki
- 2020 in Absolute Championship Akhmat
- 2020 in Fight Nights Global
- 2020 in M-1 Global
- 2020 in Road FC
- 2020 in Glory
- 2020 in K-1
- 2020 in Kunlun Fight
- 2020 in Romanian kickboxing
- 2020 in Wu Lin Feng
