= ONE Friday Fights 9 =

Combat sport events in 2023

ONE Friday Fights 9: Eersel vs. Sinsamut 2
- Promotion: ONE Championship
- Date: March 17, 2023
- Venue: Lumpinee Boxing Stadium
- City: Bangkok, Thailand

Event chronology
ONE Friday Fights 8: Petsukumvit vs. Petchmuangsri	ONE Friday Fights 9: Eersel vs. Sinsamut 2	ONE Friday Fights 10: Yodkrisada vs. Thepthaksin

ONE Friday Fights 9: Eersel vs. Sinsamut 2 (also known as ONE Lumpinee 9) was a combat sports event produced by ONE Championship that took place on March 17, 2023, at Lumpinee Boxing Stadium in Bangkok, Thailand.

== Background ==
A ONE Lightweight Muay Thai World Championship rematch between current champion Regian Eersel (also current ONE Lightweight Kickboxing Champion) and former title challenger Sinsamut Klinmee headlined the event. The pair previously fought at ONE on Prime Video 3 in October 2022, which Eersel won by split decision.

== Results ==
Main card (YouTube / Watch ONE)
Weight class				Method	Round	Time	Notes
Lightweight Muay Thai	Regian Eersel (c)	def.	Sinsamut Klinmee	KO (punch to the body)	4	1:17	(Note: For the ONE Lightweight Muay Thai World Championship.)
Bantamweight Muay Thai	Muangthai P.K.Saenchai	def.	Kulabdam Sor.Jor.Piek-U-Thai	KO (elbow)	3	1:37
Strawweight Muay Thai	Sam-A Gaiyanghadao	def.	Ryan Sheehan	KO (punch)	2	2:52
Catchweight (121 lbs) Muay Thai	PhetjeeJa Lukjaoporongtom	def.	Fani Peloumpi	TKO (punch to the body)	2	1:38
Flyweight Muay Thai	Sulaiman Looksuan	def.	Chaongoh Jitmuangnon	KO (punch)	2	1:30
Preliminary card (FanDuel TV)
Catchweight (140 lbs) Muay Thai	Saeksan Or. Kwanmuang	def.	Silviu Vitez	Decision (unanimous)	3	3:00
Catchweight (140 lbs) Muay Thai	Yodlekpet Or. Atchariya	def.	Saman Ashouri	KO (punch)	2	0:27
Flyweight Muay Thai	Tagir Khalilov	def.	Black Panther	KO (punch to the body)	1	2:04
Flyweight	Tatsumitsu Wada	def.	Ernesto Montilla	Submission (rear-naked choke)	1	1:52
Catchweight (159 lbs)	Yoon Chang Min	def.	Kirill Gorobets	Decision (split)	3	5:00
Flyweight Muay Thai	Nakrob Fairtex	def.	Chen Jiayi	TKO (knees)	2	2:45

== Bonus awards ==
The following fighters were awarded bonuses.

- Performance of the Night ($50,000): Regian Eersel
- Performance of the Night ($10,000): Muangthai P.K.Saenchai, Sam-A Gaiyanghadao, Sulaiman Looksuan, Saeksan Or. Kwanmuang, Silviu Vitez, Yodlekpet Or. Pitisak and Tagir Khalilov

== See also ==
- 2023 in ONE Championship
- List of ONE Championship events
- List of current ONE fighters
