= List of WPMF male world champions =

This is a list of WPMF world champions sanctioned by the World Professional Muaythai Federation, the professional section of the World Muaythai Federation.

== Super heavyweight ==
No.	Name	Date winning	Date losing	Days	Defenses
	(Brazil) Fabiano Cyclone (Edílson Fabiano Gonçalves Aoki)	March 21, 2010	?	?	?
Fabiano defeated Yuuki (Yuki Niimura/Japan) by unanimous decision (49-47/49-47/49-46) after 5R at "M-1 Fairtex Singha Beer Muaythai Challenge Nai Kanomtom vol. 1" at Differ Ariake in Koto, Tokyo, Japan, and he won the vacant title.
	(France) Jérôme Le Banner	July 7, 2010	?	?	?
Le Banner defeated Tomas Novack (Canada) by KO (right cross) at 5R 2:56 at Jean Ivoula Stadium in St. Denis, Reunion, France, and he won
	Menu Emerald Gym	August 11, 2010	?	?	?
Menu defeated Tyson Conmiler (Australia) at "Queen's Birthday Event", and he won the vacant title.
Interim	(France) Brice Guidon	December 4, 2010	?	?	?
Guidon defeated Tomas Novack (Canada) by KO (right cross to left low kick) at 3R at "Thailand King's Birthday" in Bangkok, Thailand, and he won the vacant title.

== Heavyweight ==
No.	Name	Date winning	Date losing	Days	Defenses
	(Russia) Ramazan Ramazanov	July 19, 2008	?	?	?
Ramazanov defeated Pete Motaung (South Africa) by KO at 2R.
	(Netherlands) Fred Sikking	May 13, 2013	?	?	?
Sikking defeated Dewey Cooper (United States) by unanimous decision after 5R in Pattaya, Thailand, and he won the vacant title.

== Cruiserweight ==
No.	Name	Date winning	Date losing	Days	Defenses
	(France) Ismael MTI Gym (Ismaël Grid)	2008	2010	?	?
On December 4. 2009, Ismael defeated Christian Combat Gym (Italy) at "King's Birthday Event" at Sanam Luang in Bangkok, Thailand and retained his title.
	(Canada) Mehdi Pouroskoui	March 2009	?	?	?
Pouroskoui won WPMF title in March 2009.He also won WPMF title in 2002, 2003, but weight class is unknown.
Interim	(Thailand) Wehars TopKingBoxing	January 22, 2011	?	?	?
	(China) Li Baoming	December 4, 2014	?	?	?
Li defeated Yūki Kudō (Japan) by KO at 4R at "King's Birthday Event" at Bangkok, Thailand, and he won the vacant title.at "King's birthday Event" at Royal Turf Club in Bangkok, Thailand, and he won the vacant interim title.
Interim	(Brazil) Vanderlei Gonçalves Dos Santos	August 11, 2017	?	?	?
Goncalves defeated Kevin Latchimy (France) by unanimous decision (50-47/50-47/50-47) after 5R at "Queen's Birth day Event" at Royal Turf Club, Bangkok, Thailand, and he won the interim vacant title.

== Light heavyweight ==
No.	Name	Date winning	Date losing	Days	Defenses
	(France) Ismael MTI Gym (Ismaël Grid)	2007	?	?	?
Ismael won WPMF title against a Turkish fighter at "King's Birthday Event".
	(Canada) Simon Marcus	March 16, 2012	?	?	1
Marcus defeated Kaoklai Kaennorsing (Thailand) by decision after 5R at CentralWorld in Ratchaprasong Shopping District, Bangkok, Thailand, and he won the vacant title. On March 14, 2013, Marcus defeated Suriya Prasarthinpimai (Thailand) by decision after 5R t "Super Fight Muay Thai" in Bali Hai Cape, Pattaya, Chonburi, Thailand, and he retained his title (1).
Interim	(Thailand) Berneung TopkingBoxing	June 14, 2013	?	?	?
Boenung defeated Tobias Alexandersson (Sweden) by TKO at 4R at "Super Fight Muay Thai" in Bali Hai Cape, Pattaya, Chonburi, Thailand, and he won the vacant onterim title.
Interim	(France) Malik Aliane (aka Mario Kiatkonwit)	March 11, 2014	April 11, 2015	396	0
	(Germany) Mark Wieser (aka Mikki Baracuda)	August 22, 2014	?	?	?
Baracuda defeated ThepPaYut PorPadit (Thailand) by KO at 2R at Suwit Muay Thai gym and stadium in Chalong, Phuket, Thailand, and he won the vacant titles of WPMF and IMC (International Muaythai Council).
Aliane defeated Saiseelek SakSiripung (Thailand) by TKO at 4R at "Suek Day to honor Mr. Kanom Tom" at Kai Choun Therd Thai Stadium in Lardklabang, Bangkok, Thailand, and he won the vacant interim title.
Interim	(Thailand) Phanom TopKingBoxing	April 11, 2015	?	?	?
Phanom defeated Malik Aliane (France) by TKO at 4R in France, and he won Aliane's interim title.

== Super middleweight ==
No.	Name	Date winning	Date losing	Days	Defenses
	(Japan) Kengo KRSgym (Kengo Yamagami)	November 9, 2005	?	?	?
Yamagami won by decision after 5R in Tha Bo District, Nong Khai Province, and he won the vacant title.
	(Thailand) Yodsanklai Fairtex	January 18, 2009	?	?	9
Yodsanklai defeated Takaaki Nakamura (Japan) by unanimous decision (50-46/50-45/50-45) at "Muay Lok Japan 2009 - The Strongest Muay Thai Festival" at the 2nd Gymnasium of Yoyogi National Gymnasium, Shibuya, Tokyo, Japan, and he won the vacant title.
Interim	(France) Samuel Andoche	September 22, 2012	March 1, 2013	160	2
Samuel defeated Ghislain Bellon (France) by TKO at 3R at "Bali Muaythai Grand Match 2012" in Bali, Indonesia and he won an interim title. On December 4, 2012, Samuel defeated Erwan Le Gosles (France) by TKO (doctor stoppage: cut) with right elbow strike at 3R at "King's Birthday" at Royal Turf Club in Bangkok, Thailand, and he retained his interim title.
Interim	(Sweden) Tobias Kaewsamrit (aka Tobbe/Tobias Alexandersson)	March 1, 2013	?	?	?
Tobias defeated Samuel Andoche (France) by KO (right cross body shot) at 3R at "WPMF Presents Muaythai World Champion Title 2013" in Bangkok, Thailand, and he won Samuel's interim title.
	(Sweden) Tobias Kaewsamrit (aka Tobbe/Tobias Alexandersson)	August 8, 2014	December 4, 2014	118	0
Tobias defeated Ederian Phoptheeratham (Adrien Rubis /France) by decision after 5R at “The Queen's birthday fight” at Sanam Luang in Bangkok, Thailand, and he won the vacant title.
	(France) Rémy Vectol	December 4, 2014	?	?	?
Vectol (WPMF #1) defeated Tobias Kaewsamrit (Sweden) by unanimous decision after 5R at "King's birthday Event" at Royal Turf Club in Bangkok, Thailand, and he retained his title.
Interim	(Thailand) Berneung TopkingBoxing	?	?	?	?
On December 4, 2014, Bernoeng defeated Ederian Phoptheeratham (Adrien Rubis /WPMF #3/France) by unanimous decision (48-47/48-47/48-47) after 5R, and he retained his title.
	(Sweden) Tobias Kaewsamrit (aka Tobbe/Tobias Alexandersson)	March 16, 2016	March 16, 2017	365	?
Tobias defeated Chu Jeetang (China) by TKO at 1R at "Suk WanChudchukiat Naikanomthom" at Wat-Chulamanee School in Bangbarn, Ayutthaya, Thailand, and he won the vacant title.
Interim	(Thailand) Eakchanachai Mor.KrungthepThonburi	April 1, 2016	?	?	?
Eakchanachai defeated Nicholas Jittigym (Nicholas Carter/United Kingdom) by unanimous decision (49-48/49-48/49-48) after 5R at "Princess Maha Chakri Sirindhorn birthday celebration event" at Royal Turf Club in Bangkok, Thailand, and he won the vacant title.
	(Thailand) Avatar Tor.Morsri	March 16, 2017	?	?	?
Avatar (WPMF #2) defeated Tobias Kaewsamrit (Tobias Alexandersson/Sweden) by unanimous decision after 5R at "Miracle Muay Thai Festival" at Wat Langka Khao, Phra Nakhon Si Ayutthaya District, Ayutthaya, Thailand, and he won Tobias's title.
	(France) Kamel Mezatni	March 16, 2018	2019		0
Mezatni defeated Carlos Prates (Brazil) by unanimous decision after 5R at the 14th World Wai Khru Muay Thai Ceremony in Phra Nakhon Si Ayutthaya District, Ayutthaya, Thailand.
	(Japan) Shintarō Matsukura	September 11, 2020	Current	2169	0
Matsukura defeated Koki Morikawa (Japan) by KO (punches) at 1R 1:27 at "Suk Wan Kingthong - go for the top" at Korakuen Hall in Bunkyo, Tokyo, Japan, and he won the vacant title. Originally, Matsukura was going to fight against Chokdamrong Chotbangsaen (Thailand) for the vacant WPMF title on April 16, but the event was cancelled because of coronavirus. WPMF Supervisor chose Morikawa as replacement.

== Middleweight ==
No.	Name	Date winning	Date losing	Days	Defenses
1	(Japan) Takahiko Shimizu	May 13, 2004	?	?	0
Shimizu defeated Perry Maniatis (Australia) by KO (elbow strike) at 2R at Patong Studium in Phuket Province, Thailand, and he won the vacant first title.
	(France) Ghislain Bellon (a.k.a. Bibi Sitjaipetch)	December 5, 2006	August 12, 2007	250	0
Bellon defeated Aydin Tuncay (France) by TKO at 4R at "King's Birthday" in Bangkok, Thailand, and he won the vacant title.
	(Brazil) Cosmo Alexandre	August 12, 2007	?	?	0
Alexanre defeated Ghislain Bellon (France) by TKO (referee stoppage) at 3R at "Queen's Birthday" at Sanam Luang in Bangkok, Thailand, and he won Bellon's title.
	(Thailand) Lerdmongkon Sor Tarntip		?	?	?
On January 18, 2009, Lerdmongkon defeated Gennarong Weerasakreck (Thailand) by unanimous decision (50-48/50-48/50-47) after 5R at "Muay Lok Japan 2009 - The Strongest Muay Thai Festival" at the 2nd Gymnasium of Yoyogi National Gymnasium, Shibuya, Tokyo, Japan. and he retained his title.
	(France) Antuan Siangboxing (Antoine Pinto)	January 21, 2011	?	?	?
Antuan defeated Bovy Sor Udomson (Thailand) by decision after 5R in Suphan Buri Province, THailand.
	(France) Abdallah Mabel	November 12, 2011	?	?	0
Mabel defeated Grégory Choplin (France) by decision after 5R at "Nuit des Champions 2011" in Marseille, France, and he won the vacant title.
	(Sweden) Tobias Kaewsamrit (aka Tobbe/Tobias Alexandersson)	December 4, 2011	December 4, 2012	366	?
Tobias defeated Panom TopKingBoxing (Thailand) by decision. On August 11, 2012, Tobias defeated Bernueng TopKing Boxing (Thailand) by decision after 5R in Bangkok, Thailand, and he retained his title (1).
	(Thailand) Panom TopKingBoxing	December 4, 2012	2013	?	?
Panom defeated Tobias Kaewsamrit (Sweden) by decision at Royal Turf Club in Bangkok, Thailand, and he won Tobias's title.
Interim	(Switzerland) Karl Chiangmai Muay Thai (Karl Wirz)	August 10, 2012	?	?	?
Karl defeated Kuwarotuff Championship (Brazil).
Interim	(France) Lukas SingPatong	July 19, 2013	?	?	?
Lukas defeated Robert (Canada) by decision after 5R at Chaweng Boxing Stadium in Surat Thani Province, Thailand.
	(Thailand) Berneung TopkingBoxing	August 11, 2013	?	?	?
Bernueng defeated Raphaël Llodra (France) by unanimous decision after 5R at "Queen's Cup" in Bangkok, Thailand, and he won the vacant title.
	(Brazil) Jos Ingramgym (Jos Rodrigues Mendonça)	July 28, 2014	2015	?	2
Jos defeated Naimjon Tuhtobaev (Uzbekistan). On December 4, 2014, Jos defeated Craudio Amonras (Italy/WPMF #3) by unanimous decision (48-47/48-47/48-47) after 5R at "King's birthday Event" at Royal Turf Club in Bangkok, Thailand, and he retained his title.
Interim	(Thailand) Dejrit Poptheeratham	August 11, 2015	?	?	?
Desrit defeated Tobias Kaewsamrit (Sweden) by decision after 5R at Royal Turf Club in Bangkok, Thailand, and he won the vacant title. On November 26, 2016, Desrit defeated Expit Valim (France) by decision after 5R at Reunion Island, France, and he retained his title (1).
	(Japan) T-98 (pronounced as "Takuya"/Takuya Imamura)	September 20, 2015	?	?	?
T-98 defeated Aonang KiatPepe (Thailand/Rajadamnern studium champion) by unanimous decision (50-47/49-48/50-48) at "The 2nd Okayama Gym Event" at Kurashiki Sanyo Heights" in Kurashiki, Okayama, Japan, and he won the vacant title. Originally, T-98 was going to challenge Jos Ingramgym for his WPMF title, but Jos had returned his title due to injury.
	(France) Jimmy Vienot	December 4, 2016	?	?	?
Vienot defeated José Alves França Neto (Brazil) by TKO at 2R at Royal Turf Club in Bangkok, Thailand, and he won the vacant title.

== Super welterweight ==
No.	Name	Date winning	Date losing	Days	Defenses
	(Thailand) Kongjak S.Thonthong	?	?	?	?
	(Thailand) Dejbanjong Fairtex	May 31, 2015	?	?	?
Dejbanjong (WPMF #5) defeated Hiroto (Hiroto Nema/Japan/WPMF #7) by TKO (referee stoppage: cut) with elbow strike at 3R 0:41 at "Tenkaichi 76 Special Live AK-69" Okinawa Convention Center in Ginowan, Okinawa, Japan, and he won the vacant title.
	(Switzerland) Alex Chiangmai Muay Thai (Alexandre Boyancé)	March 16, 2016	?	?	?
Tobias defeated Micel Admaku (Ghana) by TKO at 1R at "Suk WanChudchukiat Naikanomthom" at Wat-Chulamanee School in Bangbarn, Ayutthaya, Thailand, and he won the vacant title.
	(Thailand) Mahasal Poptheeratham	April 1, 2016	?	?	?
Mahasal defeated Kieron Jason (United Kingdom) by TKO at 2R at "Princess Maha Chakri Sirindhorn birthday celebration event" at Royal Turf Club in Bangkok, Thailand, and he won the vacan title.
Interim	(Thailand) Singmanee Kaewsamrit	March 16, 2017	May 13, 2017	58	0
Singmanee defeated Sébastien Billard (France) by TKO (left low kick) at 2R at "Miracle Muay Thai Festival" at Wat Langka Khao, Phra Nakhon Si Ayutthaya District, Ayutthaya, Thailand, and he won the vacant interim title.
Interim	(France) Bobo Sacko	May 13, 2017	?	?	?
Sacko defeated Singmanee Kaewsamrit by decision after 5R at "La Nuit Des Titans 4" at Gymnase Jean Allaseur, Montereau-Fault-Yonne, France, and he won Singmanee's interim title.
	(Thailand) Pongsiri Pet-Por-Tor-Or	December 16, 2017	?	?	?
Pongsiri defeated Samuel Bark by decision after 5R at the King's Birthday event in Bangkok, Thailand, and won the vacant title.

== Welterweight ==
No.	Name	Date winning	Date losing	Days	Defenses
1	(Japan) Masaaki Katō	April 27, 2004	?	?	0
Kato defeated Kaolan Kaovichit (Thailand) by KO (Left knee shot to head and dislocation of right shoulder) at 2R, and he won the vacant 1st title.
	(Iran) Behzad Rafigh Doust	2009	?	?	1
Behzad Rafigh Doust defeated Javier (Spain) by TKO (referee stoppage: overhand right hook) at 4R. Behzad Rafigh Doust defeated Javier (Spain) again by decision after 5R in a rematch, and he retained his title (1).
	(Switzerland) Alex Chiangmai Muay Thai (Alexandre Boyancé)	?	December 4, 2010	?	?
Alex defeated Behzad Rafigh Doust(Iran) by KO (left cross) at Rajadamnern Stadium in Bangkok, Thailand, and he won Behzad Rafigh Doust's title. On August 10, 2010, Alex won by TKO at 1R at "Queen's birthday MuayThai competition" at Sanam Luang in Bangkok, Thailand, and he retained his title (1).
	(France) Charles François	December 4, 2010	May 21, 2011	168	1
François defeated Alex Chiangmai Muay Thai (Switzerland) by KO (right cross) at 2R at "King's Birthday Event", and he won Alex's title.
Interim	(Iran) Behzad Rafigh Doust	December 4, 2010	January 22, 2011	49	0
Behzad Rafigh Doust defeated Jos Ingramgym (Brazil) by unanimous decision after 5R at "King's Birthday Event", and he won the vacant interim title.
Interim	(Brazil) Jos Ingramgym (Jos Rodrigues Mendonca)	January 22, 2011	August 12, 2011	202	1
Jos defeated Behzad Rafigh Doust (Iran) by unanimous decision (49-48/49-48/49-48) after 5R in Don Chedi District, Suphan Buri Province, Thailand, and he won Behzad Rafigh Doust's interim title. On March 17, 2011, Jos defeated Valdet Gashi (Germany/WPMF #10) by decision after 5R at "Nai Kanom Tom Memorial Event" in Pak Tho District, Ratchaburi Province, Thailand, and he retained his interim title (1).
	(Thailand) Armin Tor.Prantaksin (Armin Mutlee)	May 21, 2011	?	?	1
Armin defeated Charles François (France) by KO (left high kick) at 1R at "Les Rois du Rings" at Palais des Sports Pierre de Coubertin in Châlons-en-Champagne, France, and he won Charles's title. Armin was attacked by a strange man just after the match. On December 30, 2011, Armin defeated Charles François (France) by decision after 5R at "World Pro League Muay Thai: Gladiator's War" at Fairtex Thepprasit Boxing Stadium in Pattaya, Thailand, and he retained his title (1) and also won vacant another world welterweight title of "World Pro League Muay Thai" at the same time. Armin returned his title.
Interim	(Australia) Ris Imminent Air (Rhyse Saliba)	August 12, 2011	?	?	?
Ris defeated Jos Ingramgym (Brazil) by unanimous decision (47-48/47-48/47-48) after 5R at "Queen's Birthday Event", and he won Jos's interim title.
Interim	(France) Charles François	December 5, 2012	February 2012	?	?
François defeated Chang Shouy Youi (China) by decision after 5R at "King's Birthday Event" and he won the vacant title. François's title was vacated because of loss by KO at non-title match under 147lbs (WPMF Welterweight).
	(Thailand) Singmanee Kaewsamrit	June 24, 2012	March 24, 2014	638	5
Singmanee defeated Andrei Kulebin (Belarus) by decision after 5R at Pattaya Boxing World Stadium in Pattaya, Thailand, and he won the vacant title. On March 13, 2013, Singmanee defeated Azize Hlali (France) by decision after 5R at "World Muay Thai Festival 2013" at Wat Langkha Khao in Ayutthaya, Thailand, and he retained his title (1). On June 14, 2013, Singmanee defeated Salardine Etnaker (Salahdine Ait Naceur/France) by TKO (body shot) at 1R at "Muaythai Superfight" at "Stadium Bali Hai" in Bali Hai Pier, Pattaya, Thailand, and he reatained his title (2). On July 26, 2013, Singmanee defeated Adaylton Parreira de Freitas (Brazil) by decision after 5R at "61st Birth Anniversary of HRH The Crown Prince of Thailand" at Royal Turf Club in Bangkok, Thailand, and he retained his title (3). On December 5, 2013, Singmanee defeated Sean Sor.Sumalee (Sean Kearney/Canada) by TKO (left low kick) at 3R at "King's Birthday Event" at Sanam Luang in Bangkok, Thailand, and he retained his title (4). On December 27, 2013, Jimmy MaxSportGym (Jimmy Vienot/France) by decision after 5R at "Klongsarn Muay Thai" in Bangkok, Thailand, and he retained his title (5).
Interim	(Thailand) Saenchai P.K. Saenchai Muaythai Gym (Suphachai Saenpong)	July 20, 2012	2014	?	0
Saenchai defeated Umar Semata (Uganda) by decision after 5R at "Muay Thai Warriors 1st" in Ratchaburi Province, Thailand, and he won the vacant interim title.
	(Thailand) Dejrit Poptheeratham	March 24, 2014	2014	?	0
Dejrit defeated Singmanee Kaewsamrit (Thailand) by split decision after 5R at "Nai Khanom Tom Event" at Wat Langkha Khao in Ayutthaya, Thailand, and he won Singmanee's title. Deirit returned his title in 2014.
	(Thailand) Singmanee Kaewsamrit	December 4, 2014	?	?	2
Singmanee defeated Timur Mamatisakov (Russia) by decision after 5R at "King's Birthday Event" at Bangkok, Thailand, and he won the vacant title. On March 17, 2015, Singmanee defeated Saksonkram Poptheeratham (Thailand) by decision after 5R at "Miracle Muaythai" at Wat Langkha Khao in Ayutthaya, Thailand, and he retained his title (1). On March 16, 2016, 16 Mar 2016 Yohan PhetSamanMuayThai (Yohann Drai/France) by unanimous decision (50-47/50-47/50-47) after 5R at "Suk WanChudchukiat Naikanomthom" at Wat-Chulamanee School in Bangbarn, Ayutthaya, Thailand, and he retained his title (2).
Interim	(Brazil) José Alves França Neto	December 4, 2014	2015	?	0
Jose defeated Chen Weichao (China) by decision after 5R at "King's birthday Event" at Royal Turf Club in Bangkok, Thailand, and he won the vacant interim title.
Interim	(Thailand) Raseesing Wor.Wiwatnarnon	March 16, 2015	April 1, 2017	747	4
Raseesing defeated Bed Kiatponthip (Brad Stanton/United Kingdom) by decision after 5R at "Nai Khanom Tom Event" at in Ayutthaya, Thailand, and he won the vacant interim title. On April 1, 2016, Raseesing defeated Arthur Hugo (France) by TKO at 5R at "Princess Maha Chakri Sirindhorn birthday celebration event" at Royal Turf Club in Bangkok, Thailand, and he retained his interim title. On August 11, 2016, Raseesing defeated Jonathan Tuhu (Papua New Guinea) by TKO at 4R at "Queen's Birthday Event" at Royal Turf Club in Bangkok, Thailand, and he retained his interim title. On December 4, 2016, Raseesing defeated Jos Ingramgym (Brazil) by unanimous decision (49-48/49-48/49-48) after 5R at Royal Turf Club in Bangkok, Thailand, and he retained his interim title. On March 16, 2017, Raseesing defeated Nata Gomes (Natã Willian Gomes/Brazil) by TKO (Left middle kick and left job) at 2R at "Miracle Muay Thai Festival" at Wat Langka Khao, Phra Nakhon Si Ayutthaya District, Ayutthaya, Thailand, and he retained his title.
	(Thailand) Seamanut Sor.Srinyar	August 25, 2016	March 4, 2017	191	0
Seamanut defeated Anas Lekmari (France) by unanimous decision after 5R at Chokchai Stadium in Phuket, Thailand, and he won the vacant title.
	(France) Johny Tancray	March 4, 2017	?	?	?
Tancray (WPMF European champion) defeated Seamanut Sor.Srinyar by at "Nice Fight Night VI" at Nice, Alpes-Maritimes, France, and he won Seamanut's title.
Interim	(Uzbekistan) Ruslan Ataev	April 1, 2017	2017	?	?
Ataev defeated Raseesing Wor.Wiwatnarnon (Thailand) by TKO (right hook) at 2R at Royal Turf Club in Bangkok, Thailand, and Raseesing's interim title.
Interim	(Thailand) Buakiew Por.Pongsawang	July 28, 2017	?	?	?
Buakiew defeated Julio Lobo (Brazil) by decision after 5R at "King's Birthday Event" at Royal Turf Club in Bangkok, Thailand, and he won the vacant title.
	(Thailand) Komsan Fairtex	February 24, 2019	Current	2733	?
Komsan defeated Masato Bravely (Masato Okada/Japan/WPMF Japanese national champion) by KO (left knee shot to body) at 2R 0:55 at "The 4th Kodo" at B-Con Plaza in Beppu, Oita, Japan, and he won the vacant title.

! Interim |align=left | (United Kingdom) Richard Cadden | October 22nd, 2005 | ? | ? ! Interim |align=left | (United Kingdom) Richard Cadden | December 05, 2006 | ? | ?

== Super lightweight ==
No.	Name	Date winning	Date losing	Days	Defenses
	(Japan) Masa KRSgym (Masamitsu Hirashima)	October 22, 2005	February 16, 2006	117	1
	(United Kingdom) Liam Harrison	February 16, 2006	?	?	?
	(Thailand) Gonnapar Weerasakreck (aka Konnapar or Kongnapa)	June 14, 2015	?	?	2
Konnapar defeated Tsuyoshi Katō (Japan/WPMF Japanese national champion) by TKO (referee stoppage: left low kick) at 3R 1:12 at "Suk Weerasakreck IX" at Differ Ariake in Koto, Tokyo, Japan, and he won the vacant title. On November 23, 2016, Konnapar defeated Tatsuya Ishii (Japan) by TKO (doctor stoppage: cut) with a right elbow strike at 4R 1:39 at Differ Ariake in Koto, Tokyo, Japan, and he retained his title (1). On September 18, 2017, Konnapar defeated Ryunson Pan (South Korea/WPMF Japanese national champion) by unanimous decision (49-47/49-48/50-47) after 5R 3:00 at "M-One 2017 2nd" at Differ Ariake in Koto, Tokyo, Japan, and he retained his title (2).
Interim	(Japan) Nobu Bravely (Nobutoshi Kondō)	February 25, 2018	?	?	0
Nobu defeated Keanphet (Thailand) by KO with a right elbow strike at 1R 1:31 at "The 3rd Kodo" at B-Con Plaza in Beppu, Oita, Japan, and he won the vacant interim title.
Interim	(Japan) Hiroto Yamaguchi	December 16, 2018	?	?	0
Yamaguchi defeated Wanmario Kaewsamrit (aka Juan Mario Kaewsamrit/Spain) by unanimous decision (47-49、47-49、48-49) after 5R 3:00 at "The 5th Okayama Gym Main Event" at Okayama Budokan in Okayama, Okayama, Japan, and he won the vacant interim title.
	(Thailand) Thong Ayothaya Fight Gym	February 24, 2019	Current	2733	0
Thong defeated Nobu Bravely (Nobutoshi Kondo/Japan) by unanimous decision (50-48/49-48/49-48) after 5R 3:00 at "The 4th Kodo" at B-Con Plaza in Beppu, Oita, Japan, and he won the vacant regular title.

== Lightweight ==
No.	Name	Date winning	Date losing	Days	Defenses
	(Slovakia) Johnathan Rudolf (Rudolf Durica)	June 25, 2004	?	?	1
Durica defeated Craig O'flynn (Ireland) at Lumpinee Stadium in Bangkok, Thailand, and he won the vacant title. On December 4, 2005, Durica defeated Andrei Kulebin (Belarus) by unanimous decision (49-47/49-47/49-47) after 5R at "King's Birthday Evenr" at Sanam Luang in Bangkok, Thailand, and he retained his title (1).
	(Philippines) (United States) Vince Soberano Kaewsamrit (Adjarn Vince Soberano)	2007	?	?	?
	(Japan) Hiromasa Masuda	March 1, 2009	June 6, 2010	462	1
Masuda defeated Desamut Jor.Looksamut (Thailand) by unanimous decision (50-48/50-49/49-48) after 5R at "M-1 Fairtex Muaythai Challenge 2009 Yod Nak Suu vol.1" at Differ Ariake in Koto, Tokyo, Japan, and he won the vacant title. On August 2, 2009, Masuda defeated Yun Ha Jin (South Korea) by unanimous decision at "Hachioji Martial arts Festival - The Wall of Muyathai" at Keio Plaza Hotel Hachioji in Hachioji, Tokyo, Japan, and he retained his title (1).
	(Thailand) Kanongsuk Weerasakreck	June 6, 2010	November 13, 2011	525	1
Kanongsuk (WPMF world #4/WPMF Japan #2) defeated Hiromasa Masuda (Japan) by unanimous decision (46-50/46-50/46-49) after 5R at "M-1 Raja Boxing Singha Beer Muaythai Challenge Nai Kanomtom vol. 2" at Differ Ariake in Koto, Tokyo, Japan, and he won Masuda's title. On September 12, 2010, Kanongsuk defeated Tomofumi Endō (Japan/WPMF Japan #2) by TKO (left elbow strike) at 2R 2:49 at "M-1 Raja Boxing Singha Beer Muaythai Challenge Nai Kanomtom vol. 3" at Differ Ariake in Koto, Tokyo, Japan, and he retained his title (1). He also won Endo's M-1 Lightweight title.
	(Japan) Arito Tsukahara	November 13, 2011	June 2012	?	?
Tsukahara (WPMF Japanese national champion, WPMF #7) defeated Kanongsuk Weerasakreck (Thailand) by KO (left hook) at 4R 2:26 at "M-1 Muaythai Challenge RAORAK MUAY FAINAL" at Differ Ariake, Koto, Tokyo, and he won Kanongsuk's title. Tsukahara's title was stripped because of losing by KO at lighter weight match than WPMF lightweight. He was knocked out by Kizaemon Saiga on May 20, 2012.
Interim	(Thailand) Samerchai W.P. Sukhothai (a.k.a. Samerchai Tor Tepsutin)	March 18, 2012	?	?	?
Samerchai defeated Wanmario Kaewsamrit (Spain) by decision after 5R at "Miracle MuayThai Festival" at Ayutthaya Tourism Center in Phra Nakhon Si Ayutthaya District, Phra Nakhon Si Ayutthaya, Thailand, and he won the vacant interim title.
	(Thailand) Sagetdao Petpayathai	July 7, 2012	?	?	?
Sakeddaw (WPMF #2) defeated Penake Sitnumnoi (Thailand/WPMF #5) in Phatthalung Province, Thailand, and he won the vacant title.
	(Italy) Mathias Sitsongpeenong (a.k.a. Mathias 7 Muaythai / Mathias Gallo Cassarino)	July 26, 2013	August 8, 2014	398	?
Mathias defeated Wanmario Kaewsamrit (Spain) by nanimous decision (50-46/50-47/50-48) after 5R at "61st Birth Anniversary of HRH The Crown Prince of Thailand" at Royal Turf Club in Bangkok, Thailand, a nd he won the vacant title.
Interim	(Japan) Yōsuke Mizuochi	December 2, 2012	?	?	?
Mizuochi (WPMF #9) defeated Nong'an Sasiprapa Gym (Thailand/WPMF #4) at 2R 2:20 at "Rise/M-1 MC - Infinity" at Tokyo Dome City Hall in Bunkyo, Tokyo, Japan, and he won the vacant interim title. He returned his interim title.
Interim	(Thailand) Petchkosin Manopkarnchang	October 15, 2013	?	?	?
Petchkosin defeated Lee Kam Yam (a.k.a. Keneth Lee/Hong Kong), and he won the vacant interim title.
Interim	(Spain) Wanmario Kaewsamrit (a.k.a. Juan Mario or Wan Mario / Juan Montenegro Martín)	July 28, 2014	?	?	2
Wanmario defeated Authur Singpatong (Arthur Meyer/France) by majority decision (49-48/49-49/49/48) after 5R at "62nd Birth Anniversary of HRH The Crown Prince of Thailand" at Sanam Luang in Bangkok, Thailand and he won the vacant interim title. On December 4, 2014, Wanmario defeated Stin Banchamek (Thailand/WPMF Lightweight #3) by unanimous decision after 5R at "King's birthday Event" at Royal Turf Club in Bangkok, Thailand, and he retained his title (1). On March 16, 2015, Wanmario defeated Wanpikart Chor Chanatip (Thailand) by TKO at 3R at "Nai Khanom Tom Event" at in Ayutthaya, Thailand, and he retained his title (2).
	(Thailand) Captainken Narupai (a.k.a. Capitan Kane Narupai)	August 8, 2014	?	1	?
Captainken defeated Mathias Sitsongpeenong (Italy) by decision after 5R at "The Queen's birthday fight" at Sanam Luang in Bangkok, Thailand. On October 9, 2016, Captainken defeated Shota SaenchaiGym (Shota Sato/Japan/WPMF #1) by unanimous decision (49-48/49-48/49-47) after 5R at "The 3rd Okayama Gym Event" at Kurashiki Sanyo Heights" in Kurashiki, Okayama, Japan, and he retained his title (1).
	(Brazil) Walter Gonçalves	April 2, 2018	?	?	1
Gonçalves defeated Denkongchai Dabransalakham (Thailand) by TKO (right high kick) at 2R at "Princess Birthday 2018", and he won the vacant title. On July 26, 2018, Gonçalves defeated Daraek SutaiMuayThai (Thailand) by decision after 5R at "TerdthaiOngracha" in Bangkok, Thailand, and he retained his title.

== Super featherweight ==
No.	Name	Date winning	Date losing	Days	Defenses
	(Japan) Nakamura Or Piriyapinyo (Yukiya Nakamura)	November 25, 2008	?	?	0
Nakamura (a.k.a. Genki Nakamura) defeated Chris Sor. Vorapin (Chris Foster/Sweden) by unanimous decision (49-48/49-48/49-48) after 5R at "Suek Petchyindee" at Lumpinee Stadium in Bangkok, Thailand, and he won the vacant title.
	(Thailand) Deskamol HimarlaiGym	November 2010	November 13, 2011	?	?
	(Japan) Genji Umeno (Kenta Umeno)	November 13, 2011	?	?	0
Umeno (WPMF Japanese national champion) defeated Deskamol HimarlaiGym (Thailand) TKO (right elbow strike) at 1R 2:39 at "M-1 Muaythai Challenge RAORAK MUAY FAINAL" at Differ Ariake, Koto, Tokyo, Japan, and he won Deskamol's title.
Interim	(Thailand) Singpayak Mor.RachapatMoobarnjombung	June 2, 2012	?	?	?
Singpayak defeated Kumsap SuwitGym (Thailand) by decision after 5R at Imperial World Ladprao, and he won the vacant interim title.
	(Thailand) Rungravee Sasiprapa	April 11, 2012	?	?	?
Rungravee defeated Juan Mario Kaewsamrit (Spain) by decision after 5R at "Muay Thai Warriors in the Relation Thailand & Cambodia" in Phnom Penh, Cambodia.
	(Thailand) Penek Sitnumnoi	March 29, 2013	2015	?	?
PenEak defeated Pokaew Fonjangchonburi (Thailand) in Ko Samui, Surat Thani Province, Thailand, and he won the vacant title.
Interim	(Japan) Shigeru (Shigeru Inaba)	May 26, 2013	March 4, 2015	647	0
Shigeru defeated Yosuke Morii (Japan) by majority decision (49-48/49-49/49-48) after 5R at "M-Fight Shuken X Part.2" at Differ Ariake in Koto, Tokyo, Japan, and he won the vacant interim title.
	(Thailand) StarBoy KwaythongGym	March 4, 2015	?	?	?
StarBoy (current WPMF Featherweight champion) defeated Shigeru (Japan/WPMF Interim champion) by TKO (doctor stoppage: cut) with elbow strike at 1R 1:42 at "Rebels.34 x WPMF Japan" at Korakuen Hall in Bunkyo, Tokyo, Japan, and he unified Shigeru's interim title to regular title as the current WPMF featherweight champion. StarBoy's title was stripped because he had 2 fight on July 26, 2015 at Bangkok and Surin Province although he had to wait for 21 days after having one bout by law.
	(Japan) Hikaru Machida	September 20, 2015	?	?	?
Machida (WPMF #5) defeated Naka Kaewsamrit (Thailand/WPMF #6) by TKO (doctor stoppage: cut) with right elbow strike at 4R 3:00 at "The 2nd Okayama Gym Event" at Kurashiki Sanyo Heights" in Kurashiki, Okayama, Japan, and he won the vacant title. On October 9, 2016, Machida defeated Marpralong Sor.Bunyoungyos (Thailand) by unanimous decision (48-47/48-46/48-47) after 5R at "The 3rd Okayama Gym Event" at Kurashiki Sanyo Heights" in Kurashiki, Okayama, Japan, and he retained his title (1).
	(Japan) Yūsuke Iwaki	August 11, 2019	Current	2565	0
Iwaki defeated Kriengkrai Kaewsamrit (Thailand) by KO at 1R at JF Boxing Stadium in Pattaya, Chonburi, Thailand.

== Featherweight ==
No.	Name	Date winning	Date losing	Days	Defenses
	(Thailand) Anuwat Kaewsamrit	August 22, 2008	?	?	2
Anuwat defeated Santipab Sit. Au. Ubon (Thailand) by split decision after 5R at "Sukeminent Air" at Lumpinee Stadium in Bangkok, Thailand. On July 11, 2010, Anuwat defeated Shunta (Shunta Itō/Japan) by TKO (referee stoppage: punches) at 1R 2:05 at "M-1 FAIRTEX Muaythai Challenge 2009 Yod Nak Suu vol.1" at Differ Ariake in Koto, Tokyo, Japan, and he retained his title (1). On July 11, 2010, Anuwat defeated Shin Saenchai gym (Fumio Ujihara/Japan/WPMF #3) by KO (right hook) at 5R 0:33 at "Muay Thai Open 12" at Differ Ariake in Koto, Tokyo, Japan, and he retained his title (2).
	(Thailand) Jaisu Tor.Thepstin	December 4, 2011	2012	?	?
Jaisu defeated Gaylord Montier (France) by decision after 5R at "King's Birthday Event" at Royal Turf Club in Bangkok, Thailand, and he won the vacant title. In 2012, his title was vacated because of loss by KO in a match at lighter weight than WPMF Featherweight.
	(Thailand) StarBoy KwaythongGym	July 19, 2013	March 2015	?	1
StarBoy defeated Jenarong Tor Thaksin (Thailand) by decision after 5R at Chaweng Boxing Stadium in Ko Samui, Surat Thani Province, Thailand, and he won the vacant title. On September 21, 2014, StarBoy defeated Daiki Nagashima (Japan/WPMF featherweight Japanese national champion) by TKO (referee stoppage: right middle kick to head downing) at 1R 2:35 at "M-Fight Suk Weerasakreck VII" at Differ Ariake in Koto, Tokyo, Japan, and he retained his title (1). In March, 2015, the current title became vacant due to challenging WPMF Super featherweight title.
	(Japan) Sōta Ichinohe	July 12, 2015	2016	?	0
Ichinohe (WPMF #4) defeated Wuthides Sor.Jor.Wikitphetriew (Thailand/WPMF #5) by unanimous decision after 5R at "Tōjinsai in Tsugaru" at Plaza Malue Goshogawara in Goshogawara, Aomori, Japan. Although he was the current WPMF super bantamweight champion, he won the vacant title at featherweight. In September 2016, the championship became vacant.
	(Thailand) Yodsila Fairtex	September 25, 2016	2017	?	0
Yodsila defeated Rajsee IT2000 (Thailand) by TKO (referee stoppage: cut) at 3R 0:35 at "M-One 2016 3rd" at Differ Ariake in Koto, Tokyo, Japan, and he won the vacant title.
	(Thailand) Krobsut Fairtex	November 26, 2017	?	?	?
Krobsut defeated Xia Yu (Hong Kong) by unanimous decision (50-46/50-47/50-48) at "M-One 2017 Final" at Differ Ariake in Koto, Tokyo, Japan, and he won the vacant title.

== Super bantamweight ==
No.	Name	Date winning	Date losing	Days	Defenses
	(Thailand) Wanlop Weerasakreck	January 18, 2009	September 13, 2009	238	0
Wanrop defeated Ottonoi Sor.wonton (Thailand/WPMF #6) by majority decision (49-48/49-49/50-49) at "Muay Lok Japan 2009 - The Strongest Muay Thai Festival" at the 2nd Gymnasium of Yoyogi National Gymnasium, Shibuya, Tokyo, Japan, and he won the vacant title.
	(Japan) Arashi Fujihara (Masaki Fujihara)	September 13, 2009	?	?	?
Fujihara defeated Wanrop Weerasakreck (Thailand) by majority decision (49-48/49-49/49-48) after 5R at " M-1 FAIRTEX SINGHA BEER Muaythai Challenge 2009 Yod Nak Suu vol.3" at Differ Ariake at Koto, Tokyo, Japan, and he won Wanrop's title.
	(Thailand) Rakkiat Kiatprapas	March 17, 2011	?	?	?
Kiatprapas defeated Kaodeang Surafisfarm (Thailand) by decision after 5R.
	(Japan) Sōta Ichinohe	September 15, 2013	July 12, 2015	665	1
Ichinohe defeated MuangPol N&P BoxingGym (Thailand) by TKO (left high kick) at 4R 2:43 at "M-Fight Suk Weerasakreck III Part.2" at Differ Ariake at Koto, Tokyo, Japan, and he won the vacant title. On November 9, 2014, Ichinohe drew Superman Kiatchatchai (Thailand/WPMF #4) by decision 0-1 (49-49/48-49/49-49) after 5R at "WPMF Japan Suk Weerasakreck VIII" at Differ Ariake at Shinjuku, Tokyo, Japan, and he retained his title (1). On July 12, 2015, Ichinohe became WPMF world featherweight champion as current WPMF super bantamweight champion, and his super bantamweight title was returned.
	(Thailand) Chuchai Kaewsamrit	March 17, 2016	October 9, 2016	206	?
Chuchai defeated Sampson GrandMuayThai (Ghana) by KO at 3R at "Miracle Muay Thai" at Wat-Langkha Khao, Ayutthaya, Thailand, and she won the vacant title.
	(Japan) Keisuke Miyamoto	October 9, 2016	?	?	?
Miyamoto (WPMF #3) defeated Chuchai Kaewsamrit (Thailand) by KO (Right liver kick/Mikazuki Kick) at 2R 2:09 at "The 3rd Okayama Gym Event" at Kurashiki Sanyo Heights in Kurashiki, Okayama, Japan, and he won Chuchai's title.
	(Thailand) Dausakon Mor.Tasanai	November 26, 2017	April 27, 2018	152	0
Dausakon defeated Suen Tak Chuen (Hong Kong) by unanimous decision (49-48/50-47/50-48) after 5R at "M-One 2017 Final" at Differ Ariake, Minato, Tokyo, Japan, and he won the vacant title.
	(Japan) Eisaku Ogasawara	April 27, 2018	Current	3036	?
Ogasawara defeated Dausakon Motasainai (Thailand) by KO (right hook) at 3R 0:49 at "Rebels.55" at Korakuen Hall in Bunkyo, Tokyo, Japan, and he won Dausakon's title.

== Bantamweight ==
No.	Name	Date winning	Date losing	Days	Defenses
On January 18, 2009, Arashi Fujihara (Japan) vs Yokmoracot Pethforcas (Thailand/WPMF #4) was drawn 1-1 (50-49/48-49/49-49) after 5R for the vacant title at "Muay Lok Japan 2009 - The Strongest Muay Thai Festival" at the 2nd Gymnasium of Yoyogi National Gymnasium, Shibuya, Tokyo, Japan.
	(Thailand) Kongkiat Tor.Pran 49	August 10, 2013		?	?
Kongkiat defeated Wirachon Tor.Thepstin (Thailand) by decision after 5R.
Interim	(Japan) Takaaki Hayashi	September 19, 2015	?	?	?
Hayashi (WPMF #7) defeated Masaki Takeuchi (Japan/WPMF #6, WPMF Japanese champion) by KO (right elbow strike) at 3R 0:44 at "Grachan19×Bom IX.5" at Ota-City General Gymnasium in Ota, Tokyo, Japan, and he won the vacant interim title.
	(Thailand) Kanthep M.T.M. Academy	2017	?	?	?
	(Australia) Rocky Tor Santiennoi (Rocky Ogden)	April 2, 2018	?	?	?
Rocky defeated Kattanlek Sanyalomaxangthong (Catanulek/Thailand) by unanimous decision (48-49/47-49/47-49) after 5R at "Princess Birthday 2018", and he won the vacant title.

== Super flyweight ==
No.	Name	Date winning	Date losing	Days	Defenses
	(Thailand) Dawsaming Ingramgym	September 1, 2007	?	?	?
Dawsaming defeated Tomonori (Tomonori Sato/Japan) by unanimous decision (49-48/49-48/49-48) after 5R at "Japan-Thailand Friendship 120th Memorial Event" at Chnatana YingYong Gimunasium, Supachalasai Stadium in Bangkok, Thailand, and he won the vacant title.
	(Thailand) Rathakhet Teeded99	September 6, 2011	?	?	?
Rathakhet defeated Wirachai Wor.Wiwatnarnan (Thailand) by decision after 5R.
	(Thailand) Polkrit Chor.Chunkamol	July 9, 2013	2017	?	?
Pollakrit defeated Polkrit Chor.Chunkamol (Thailand) by decision after 5R.
	(Thailand) Ritthikrai Kaewsamrit	October 15, 2017	?	?	?
Ritthikrai defeated Yuya Iwanami (Japan) by unanimous decision (49-47/49-48/49－47) after 5R at "The 4th Okayama Gym Event" at Kurashiki Sanyo Heights in Kurashiki, Okayama, Japan, and he won the vacant title.
	(Japan) Satoshi Katashima	December 1, 2019	Current	2453	0
Katashima (WPMF Japanese champion) defeated Thuakhiao KiatKamPhon (Thailand) by TKO (referee stoppage: cut) at 4R 2:30 at "Suk Wan Kingthong Rookies" at Gold's Gym South Tokyo ANNEX Ōmoro in Ota, Tokyo, Japan, and he won the vacant title.

== Flyweight ==
No.	Name	Date winning	Date losing	Days	Defenses
	(Japan) KENT (Kento Kikkawa)	September 13, 2009	?	?	?
KENT (WPMF #1) defeated Hukbar bin Hanfi (Malaysia/WPMF #4) by unanimous decision (49-48/49-48/49-48) after 5R at "M-1 FAIRTEX SHINGHA BEER Muaythai Challenge 2009 Yod Nak Suu vol.3" in Differ Ariake in Koto, Tokyo, Japan, and he won the vacant title.
	(Thailand) Ritthikrai Kaewsamrit	March 22, 2012	June 14, 2013	449	?
Ritthikrai defeated Ainun NamprikThaiNepal (Thailand) by decision after 5R.
	(Thailand) Jomthap Tor.Pran 29 (a.k.a. Jomphop)	June 14, 2013	January 2015	?	?
Jomthap defeated Ritthikrai Kaewsamrit (Thailand) by decision after 5R at Bali Hai, Pattaya, Chonburi, Thailand, and he won Ritthikrai's title.
Interim	(Thailand) Palangpol WatcharachaiGym	?	?	?	?
	(Japan) Kaito Wor.Wanchai (Kaito Fukuda)	March 17, 2015	?	?	?
Kaito (WPMF #8) defeated Noppadon Phetphuthong (Cambodia/WPMF #7) by unanimous decision after 5R at "Miracle Muaythai" at Wat Langkha Khao in Ayutthaya, Thailand, and he won the vacant title.
	(Thailand) Yoddoy Kaesamrit	March 28, 2017	February 24, 2019	698	0
Yoddoy defeated Kaopayak Kiatbussabar (Thailand) by TKO at 1R and he won the vacant title.
	(Japan) Issei Wor.Wanchai (Issei Ishii)	February 24, 2019	Current	2733	0
Issei defeated Yoddoy Kaesamrit (Thailand) by KO (left hook) at 3R 2:00 at "The 4th Kodo" at B-Con Plaza in Beppu, Oita, Japan, and he won Yoddoy's title.

== Light flyweight ==
No.	Name	Date winning	Date losing	Days	Defenses
	(Thailand) Phetsila MTM Academy		?	?	?
On December 8, 2019, Phetsila defeated Ryuya Eiwasports gym (Ryūya Okuwaki/Japan) by majority decision (49-49/50-49/49-47) after 5R at "The Battle of Muaythai BOM2-6 Part II" at New Pier Hall in Minato, Tokyo, Japan, and he retained his title.

== Mini flyweight ==
No.	Name	Date winning	Date losing	Days	Defenses
	(Japan) Ryuya Eiwasports gym (Ryūya Okuwaki)	February 9, 2020	Current	2383	0
Ryuya (Rajadamnern stadium champion) defeated Udonnoi Bestbet 9955 (Thailand/WPMF #2) by KO (right hook) at 4R 0:57 at "The Battle of Muaythai – season II vol.7" at Shinjuku Face in Shinjuku, Tokyo, Japan, and he won the vacant title. If Okuwaki lost this match by KO, his Rajadamnern stadium title would be vacated.

== See also ==
- List of WPMF female world champions
- List of WBC Muaythai world champions
- List of IBF Muaythai world champions
