= Sthirasuta =

Sthirasuta (Thai: เสถียรสุต) is a Thai surname. It was the 1840th surname granted by King Vajiravudh, to Acting Sub Lieutenant Yoi, who was mechanic of the royal yacht Maha Chakri.

Notable people with the surname include:

- Sansanee Sthirasuta (1953–2021), Thai Buddhist spiritual teacher
- Sthira Sthirasuta (1926–2017), Thai real estate developer
