= List of WPMF female world champions =

This is a list of WPMF world champions, showing every female world champion certificated by the World Professional Muaythai Federation (WPMF). The WPMF, which is one of the major governing bodies in professional Muay Thai(Thai boxing), started certifying their own Muay Thai world champions in 17 different weight classes.

== Welterweight ==
| No. | Name | Date winning | Date losing | Days | Defenses |
|---|---|---|---|---|---|
| | (Australia) Claire Julia Baxter | March 16, 2017 | ? | ? | ? |
Baxter defeated Mangkonkaw Pongmaiprakatgym (Thailand) by unanimous decision after 5R at "Miracle Muay Thai Festival" at Wat Langka Khao, Phra Nakhon Si Ayutthaya District, Ayutthaya, Thailand, and she won the vacant title.

== Super lightweight ==
| No. | Name | Date winning | Date losing | Days | Defenses |
|---|---|---|---|---|---|
| | (Luxembourg) Claire Tiger Muay Thai (Claire Haigh) | | December 4, 2009 | ? | ? |
| | (United Kingdom) Julie Kitchen | | ? | ? | ? |
Kitchen defeated Claire Tiger Muay Thai (Claire Haigh/Luxembourg) by unanimous decision after 5R at "King's Cup" in Bangkok, Thailand, and she won Claire's title.
| | (Canada) Candice K Mitchell | August 11, 2016 | ? | ? | ? |
Mitchell defeated Lola Russo (Argentina) by unanimous decision (50-47/50-47/50-47) after 5R at "Queen's Birthday Event" at Royal Turf Club in Bangkok, Thailand, and she retained her title.

== Featherweight ==
| No. | Name | Date winning | Date losing | Days | Defenses |
|---|---|---|---|---|---|
| | (United Kingdom) Melissa Iminentair | ? | December 4, 2009 | ? | ? |
| | (Australia) Therasa Carter | December 4, 2009 | ? | ? | ? |
| | Lindsay Ball (SinbiMuayThai) Queens Cup Champion | August 11, 2011 | | | |
| Interim | (Thailand) Sawsing Sor.Sopis/Mor.Ratthanabandit | ? | August 25, 2016 | ? | ? |
On August 25, 2016, she lost her interim title by losing match for the vacant regular featherweight title.
| | (Canada) Ashley Khu Khrit (Ashley Nichols) | August 25, 2016 | ? | ? | ? |
Ashley (WPMF current Super bantamweight champion) defeated Sawsing Sor.Sopis/Mor.Ratthanabandit (Thailand/WPMF Interim featherweight champion) by split decision after 5R at Chokchai Stadium in Phuket, Thailand, and she won the vacant title.

Lindsay Sinbi MuayThai (Lindsay Ball) Canadian, won WPMF world featherweight title on Queens Cup Main Event on Channel 7 Thailand, August 11, 2011

== Super bantamweight ==
| No. | Name | Date winning | Date losing | Days | Defenses |
|---|---|---|---|---|---|
| Interim | (Canada) Ashley Khu Khrit (Ashley Nichols) | December 4, 2014 | ? | ? | ? |
Ashley defeated Phettapee Mor.Krungthep Thonburi (Thailand/) by TKO at 3R at "King's Birthday Event" at Bangkok, Thailand, and she won the vacant title.
| | (Canada) Ashley Nichols | March 17, 2016 | August 25, 2016 | 161 | ? |
Nichols defeated Kwanchai Sor.Twanrung (Thailand) by KO at 5R at "Miracle MuayThai" at Wat-Langkha Khao, Ayutthaya, Thailand, and she won the vacant title. On August 11, 2016, Nichols defeated Jennifer Cavanagh (Australia) by TKO at 4R at "Queen's Birthday Event" at Royal Turf Club in Bangkok, Thailand, and she retained her title. On August 25, 2016, she won the vacant regular title of WPMF Female Featherweight title and lost her Super bantamweight title.

== Bantamweight ==
| No. | Name | Date winning | Date losing | Days | Defenses! |
|---|---|---|---|---|---|
| | (Germany) Farida Okiko | | ? | ? | ? |
On August 8, 2014, Okiko defeated Saifar Sor.Suparat (Thailand) by decision after 5R at "The Queen's birthday fight" at Sanam Luang in Bangkok, Thailand.

== Flyweight ==
| No. | Name | Date winning | Date losing | Days | Defenses |
|---|---|---|---|---|---|
| Interim | (New Zealand) Sara Lee Lenkin | December 4, 2014 | ? | ? | ? |
Lenkin defeated The Star MokPattaya (Thailand) by unanimous decision after 5R at "King's Birthday Event" at Bangkok, Thailand, and he won the vacant title.at "King's birthday Event" at Royal Turf Club in Bangkok, Thailand, and she won the vacant interim title.
| Interim | (Thailand) NongKwang Sor.Jor.Lekmuangnon | March 17, 2015 | ? | ? | ? |
NongKwang defeated Ceasar Lankin (Australia) by decision after 5R at "Miracle Muaythai" at Wat Langkha Khao in Ayutthaya, Thailand, and she won the vacant title.

== Light flyweight ==
| No. | Name | Date winning | Date losing | Days | Defenses! |
|---|---|---|---|---|---|
| | (Thailand) Tanonchanok Rongriang Lampang | | ? | ? | ? |
August 8, 2014, Tanonchanok defeated Sara Rankin (Australia) by decision after 5R at "The Queen's birthday fight" at Sanam Luang in Bangkok, Thailand, and she retained her title.
| Interim | (Thailand) Thananchanok R.R.KilaLampang | | ? | ? | ? |
On April 1, 2016, Thananchanok defeated Cocopuff Wor.Santai (Canada) by unanimous decision (49-47/49-47/49-47) after 5R at "Princess Maha Chakri Sirindhorn birthday celebration event" at Royal Turf Club in Bangkok, Thailand, and she retained her interim title. On August 11, 2016, Thananchanok defeated Phetpayar Mor.KrungthepThonburi (Thailand) by split decision (49-48/49-48/48-49) after 5R at "Queen's Birthday Event" at Royal Turf Club in Bangkok, Thailand, and she retained her interim title. On December 4, 2016, Thananchanok defeated Phetpayar Mor.KrungthepThonburi (Thailand) again by unanimous decision (49-48/49-48/49-48) after 5R at Royal Turf Club in Bangkok, Thailand, and she retained his interim title.

== Mini flyweight ==
| No. | Name | Date winning | Date losing | Days | Defenses |
|---|---|---|---|---|---|
| | (Thailand) Duangdawnoy Lukklongtan | December 4, 2014 | May 31, 2015 | 178 | ? |
Duangdawnoy defeated Phetkrarat Mor.KrungthepThonburi (Thailand) by unanimous decision after 5R at "King's Birthday Event" at Bangkok, Thailand, and she won the vacant title.
| | (Japan) Haru Tajima | May 31, 2015 | ? | ? | ? |
Tajima defeated Duangdawnoy Lukklongtan (Thailand) by KO at 5R 1:40 at "TENKAICHI 76 Special Live AK-69" Okinawa Convention Center in Ginowan, Okinawa, Japan, and she won Duangdawnoy's title.
| | (Thailand) Kaewta Por Muengpetch | | July 29, 2018 | | |
| | (Thailand) Kularbdam Sit.Sor.Nor | July 29, 2018 | Current | 2676 | 1 |
Kularbdam defeated Kaewta Por Muengpetch (Thailand) the current champion at JF Boxing Stadium in Pattaya, Chonburi, Thailand, and she won Kaewta's title. Kularbdam defeated Ai Tanaka (Japan) by unanimous decision(49-46/49-47/49-47) after 5R at "Miracle Muay Thai Festival" on March 16, 2019 at Wat Langkha Khao in Ayutthaya, Thailand, and she retained her title.

== Pinweight ==
| No. | Name | Date winning | Date losing | Days | Defenses |
|---|---|---|---|---|---|
| | (Japan) Ai "Bōkun" Tanaka | August 11, 2019 | Current | 2298 | 0 |
Tanaka defeated Meiji UmkratongChiengmaiGym (Thailand) by unanimous decision after 5R at JF Boxing Stadium in Pattaya, Chonburi, Thailand.

== See also ==
- List of WPMF male world champions
- List of WBC Muaythai world champions
- List of IBF Muaythai world champions
