= Sthira Sthirasuta =

Thai real estate developer and socialite (1926–2017)

Sthira Sthirasuta (also spelled Sathien Sathirasut, etc., Thai: เสถียร เสถียรสุต, pronounced [sa.tʰǐan sa.tʰǐa.ra.sùt]; 1926 – 9 December 2017) was a Thai real estate developer and socialite, known as an art collector, stable owner, Muay Thai promoter, and Buddhist benefactor.

Sthira was born into a land-owning family. He attended school at Vajiravudh College and received education in the United Kingdom. From the family's holdings, he developed the Ploenchit Arcade shopping centre, and later managed The Regent Bangkok hotel. He was a member of high society, known for his colourful lifestyle and gangster reputation. He had large collections of art and Buddha amulets, and was a stable-owner, his horses regularly racing at the Pathum Wan and Nang Loeng racecourses. He founded the Sor Ploenchit Muay Thai gym in 1981.

In the 1970s, Sthira became romantically involved with Sansanee Panyasiri, who would later become better known as a mae chi (woman monastic), having renounced worldly life after learning that he was already married. He supported her spiritual path, and became the benefactor of the meditation centre she founded, Sathira-Dhammasthan.
