= Constitution Drafting Assembly of Thailand =

Legislative body in Thailand

Constitution Drafting Assembly of Thailand (Thai: สภาร่างรัฐธรรมนูญแห่งราชอาณาจักรไทย; RTGS: Sapha Rang Ratthathammanun Haeng Ratcha Anachak Thai), or, in brief, CDA (Thai: สสร.), is a legislative body in Thailand bearing the duty to draw up a permanent Constitution of the Kingdom of Thailand. This kind of Assembly has usually been established after a military junta seized power in the country or by reason of the need to solve political crises in the country.

The Constitution of the Kingdom of Thailand, BE 2492 (1949) was the first constitution having been prepared by the CDA.

== 1996 ==
Under the premiership of Banharn Silpa-Archa, there were public demands to have the politics reformed and the constitution amended. The Government then caused a CDA to be established by amending the Constitution of the Kingdom of Thailand, BE 2534 (1991) to make provisions for having a new constitution.

At that time, the CDA established consisted of 99 members being 76 deputies elected by citizens of 76 Chanagwats, and 23 academicians from higher education institutes.

Bhumibol Adulyadej appointed Uthai Phimchaichon as the CDA President.

The success of the CDA was the well-known Constitution of the Kingdom of Thailand, BE 2540 (1997).

== 2007 ==
The CDA was established once again after the Constitution of the Kingdom of Thailand, BE 2540 (1997) was abrogated by the Council for Democratic Reform (CDR), a military junta which seized power in 2006.

It consisted of 100 members, 28 from the public service sector, 27 from the private sector, 23 from the social sector and 22 from the academic sector, or 10 from the northern region, 68 from the central region, 12 from the eastern region and 10 from the southern region.

Such 100 members were selected on 27 December 2006 by the CDR from the nominations submitted by the National People's Assembly, and appointed by Bhumibol Adulyadej on 2007, 1 January. The King's royal command appointing CDA members was countersigned by the CDR Leader, Sonthi Boonyaratglin. The members selected amongst themselves Noranit Setthabut as their President, Decho Sawananon, their 1st Vice President and Kroekkiat Phiphatseritham, their 2nd Vice President.

The Thai mass media gave the CDA the nickname "saep sanit sit khomocho" (Thai: แสบสนิทศิษย์ คมช., "Tart Sons of CNS").

The success of the CDA was the Constitution of the Kingdom of Thailand, BE 2550 (2007).

== 2026 ==
Under the agreement between the Bhumjaithai Party and the People's Party, a referendum will be held in 2026 calling for the creation of another CDA, alongside a Constitution Drafting Advisory Council (Thai: สภาที่ปรึกษาการยกร่างรัฐธรรมนูญ). Under the People's Party draft law, the CDA will consist of 35 members elected by parliament from a shortlist of 70 candidates elected by the people. The Constitution Drafting Advisory Council will consist of 100 members, directly elected by the people in 77 constituencies based on the provinces.
