= Walter Goncalves =

Brazilian Muay Thai fighter (born 1998)

Walter Gonçalves
- Born: Walter Gonçalves De Sousa; 8 June 1998 (age 28); Fortaleza, Brazil
- Height: 1.61 m (5 ft 3 in)
- Weight: 61 kg (134 lb; 9 st 8 lb)
- Reach: 71 in (180 cm)
- Fighting out of: Phuket, Thailand
- Team: Phuket Fight club

Kickboxing record
- Total: 78
- Wins: 67
- By knockout: 36
- Losses: 11
- By knockout: 2

Mixed martial arts record
- Total: 1
- Wins: 0
- Losses: 1
- By decision: 1

Walter Gonçalves (born June 1, 1998) is a Brazilian Muay Thai fighter.

== Muay thai career ==
Gonçalves was booked to face Denkongchai Dabransalakham for the vacant WPMF Lightweight title at the Princess Prathep's birthday event on March 31, 2018. He won the fight by a second-round knockout.

Gonçalves participated in the 2018 Muay Xtreme 60 kg tournament, held on June 1, 2018. He faced Christian Hyatt in the tournament finals, after having beat Singthong by decision in the quarterfinals and Sornpetch SamartPayakaroonGym by decision in the semifinals. Gonçalves captured the Muax Xtreme 60 kg title with a first-round knockout of Hyatt.

Gonçalves made his first WPMF lightweight title defense against Daraek SutaiMuayThai at the TerdthaiOngracha event on July 26, 2018. He won the fight by decision.

Gonçalves faced Chatchai PK.Saenchaimuaythaigym at Top King World Series - TK22 on September 22, 2018. He lost the fight by decision. Gonçalves next faced Pedro Ruiz at Yas Island Muay Thai on November 24, 2018. He won the fight by decision.

=== ONE Championship ===
Gonçalves faced Rodtang Jitmuangnon for the ONE Flyweight Muay Thai World Championship at ONE: Century on October 13, 2019, in his ONE Championship debut. He lost the fight by split decision.

Gonçalves faced Kohei Kodera at ONE: Collision Course 2 on December 25, 2020. He lost the fight by a second-round technical knockout, due to a leg injury sustained during the bout.

==== ONE Flyweight Muay Thai World Grand Prix ====
In the quarterfinal, Gonçalves was scheduled to face Jonathan Haggerty at ONE 157 on May 20, 2022. However, Haggerty was forced to pull out of his bout at the last minute due to health issue and was replaced by Josue Cruz. Gonçalves won the fight by a first-round technical knockout.

In the semifinal, Gonçalves faced Superlek Kiatmuu9 at ONE on Prime Video 1 on August 27, 2022. He lost after getting knocked out with an elbow in the first round.

==== Post Grand Prix ====
Gonçalves faced Jacob Smith on December 9, 2023, at ONE Fight Night 17. He lost the fight via knockout in the first round.

Goncalves faced Aliff Sor.Dechapan on November 9, 2024, at ONE 169. He lost the fight via unanimous decision.

== Mixed martial arts career ==
=== ONE Championship ===
Gonçalves made his mixed martial arts debut against Banma Duoji on July 15, 2023, at ONE Fight Night 12. He lost the bout via unanimous decision.

== Titles and achievements ==
- World Professional Muaythai Federation
  - 2018 World Professional Muaythai Federation 135 lbs Champion
- MX Muay Xtreme
  - 2018 MX Muay Xtreme -60 kg Champion
- P-1
  - 2017 P-1 Chang Tournament Champion

== Fight record ==
Muay Thai Record
67 Wins (36 (T)KO's), 11 Losses
Date	Result	Opponent	Event	Location	Method	Round	Time
2025-09-19	Loss	(Thailand) Kongchai Chanaidonmuang	ONE Friday Fights 125	Bangkok, Thailand	Decision (Unanimous)	3	3:00
2025-04-04	Win	(Spain) Xavier Gonzalez	ONE Friday Fights 103, Lumpinee Stadium	Bangkok, Thailand	Decision (Unanimous)	3	3:00
2024-11-09	Loss	(Malaysia) Aliff Sor.Dechapan	ONE 169	Bangkok, Thailand	Decision (unanimous)	3	3:00
2023-12-09	Loss	(United Kingdom) Jacob Smith	ONE Fight Night 17	Bangkok, Thailand	KO (Knee to the body)	1	2:54
2022-08-27	Loss	(Thailand) Superlek Kiatmuu9	ONE on Prime Video 1	Kallang, Singapore	KO (Elbow)	1	1:35
ONE Flyweight Muay Thai World Grand Prix Semifinal.
2022-05-20	Win	(Mexico) Josue Cruz	ONE 157	Kallang, Singapore	TKO (punches and knees)	1	0:35
ONE Flyweight Muay Thai World Grand Prix Quarterfinal.
2020-12-25	Loss	(Japan) Momotaro	ONE: Collision Course 2	Kallang, Singapore	TKO (Leg injury)	2	0:30
2019-10-13	Loss	(Thailand) Rodtang Jitmuangnon	ONE: Century – Part 2	Tokyo, Japan	Decision (Split)	5	3:00
For the ONE Flyweight Muay Thai World Championship.
2019-03-08	Win	(Netherlands) Matthew Daalman	Fight Night Dubai	Dubai, United Arab Emirates	TKO (referee stoppage)	3	
2019-02-05	Loss	(Thailand) Petsimok PK.saenchai	Lumpinee Stadium	Bangkok, Thailand	Decision	5	3:00
2018-11-24	Win	(Spain) Pedro Ruiz	Yas Island Muay Thai	Abu Dhabi, United Arab Emirates	Decision	5	3:00
2018-11-03	Win	(China) Tian Zongyao	Wu Lin Feng 2018: WLF -67kg World Cup 2018-2019 5th Round	China	KO (Middle Kick)	1	2:05
2018-09-22	Loss	(Thailand) Chatchai PK.Saenchaimuaythaigym	Top King World Series - TK22	Ko Samui, Thailand	Decision	3	3:00
2018-09-01	Win	(China) Hao Yijie	Wu Lin Feng 2018: WLF -67kg World Cup 2018-2019 3rd Round	China	KO (Front Kick)	3	
2018-07-26	Win	(Thailand) Daraek SutaiMuayThai	TerdthaiOngracha, King's Birthday	Bangkok, Thailand	Decision	5	3:00
Defends WPMF World 135lbs Title.
2018-06-16	Win	(United States) Christian Hyatt	Muay Xtreme, -60 kg Tournament Final	Bangkok, Thailand	KO (Body Kick)	1	
Wins the Muay Xtreme -60kg Title.
2018-06-01	Win	(Thailand) Sornpetch SamartPayakaroonGym	Muay Xtreme, -60 kg Tournament Semi Final	Bangkok, Thailand	Ext.R Decision	4	3:00
2018-05-17	Win	(Thailand) Singthong	Muay Xtreme, -60 kg Tournament Quarter Final	Bangkok, Thailand	Decision	3	3:00
2018-03-31	Win	(Thailand) Denkongchai Dabransalakham	Princess Prathep's birthday	Bangkok, Thailand	KO (High Kick)	2	
Wins the WPMF World 135lbs Title.
2018-03-09	Win	(Thailand) Mahachai M.U.Den	Muay Xtreme	Thailand	KO	2	
2017-12-02	Win	(Thailand)	P-1 Chang Tournament, Final	Thailand	Decision	3	3:00
Wins P-1 Chang Tournament Title.
2017-12-02	Win	(Thailand)	P-1 Chang Tournament, Semi Final	Thailand	KO		
2017-12-02	Win	(Thailand)	P-1 Chang Tournament, Quarter Final	Thailand	KO		
2017-11-17	Win	(Thailand)		Phatthalung, Thailand	KO	1	
2017-09-17	Loss	(Thailand) Tone Sor.Tragoonpetch	Max Muay Thai	Thailand	Decision	3	3:00
2017-08-13	Win	(Thailand) Marseemok Chor Kowyuhaisuzu	Max Muay Thai	Thailand	KO	2	
2017-07-23	Win	(Thailand) Chalampetch Pojseemummuang	Max Muay Thai	Thailand	KO (Straight to the Body)	1	
2017-07-07	Win	(Thailand)	Bangla Boxing Stadium	Thailand	KO	1	
2017-05-15	Loss	(Thailand)		Thailand	TKO (Doctor Stoppage/Broken Hand		
2017-04-22	Win	(Thailand)	Max Muay Thai	Bangkok, Thailand	KO	2	
2017-04-01	Win	(Thailand)		Bangkok, Thailand	KO	2	
2017-03-20	Win	(Thailand)	Patong Stadium	Pa Tong, Thailand	KO		
2017-02-17	Win	(Thailand) Chornpetch Kornsarakarm	Max Muay Thai	Thailand	KO (Left Hook)	1	
2016	Win		Patong Stadium	Pa Tong, Thailand	TKO (High Kick)		
Legend: Win Loss Draw/No contest Notes

== Mixed martial arts record ==
Professional record breakdown
1 match	0 wins	1 loss
By decision	0	1

Res.	Record	Opponent	Method	Event	Date	Round	Time	Location	Notes
Loss	0–1	Banma Duoji	Decision (unanimous)	ONE Fight Night 12	July 15, 2023	3	5:00	Bangkok, Thailand	Bantamweight debut; Goncalves missed weight (135.75 lb).

== See also ==
- List of male kickboxers
- List of WPMF male world champions
