= National People's Assembly of Thailand =

National People's Assembly (NPA) or National General Assembly (Thai: สมัชชาแห่งชาติ; RTGS: Samatcha Haeng Chat, สมช.) is the name given to two historical assemblies in Thailand, instituted in 1973 and 2006. They consisted of citizens from various sectors for the purpose of electing some among themselves to constitute the Constitution Drafting Assembly (CDA). After the formation of the CDA, the NPA would cease to exist.

== 1973 ==
After the events of the 14 October uprising in 1973, a National General Assembly was convoked by King Bhumibol Adulyadej in order to form a Constitution Drafting Assembly in charge of drawing up a new constitution.

As it was held at the Nang Loeng Racecourse, the assembly later became known as the "Racecourse Assembly."

== 2006 ==
After the Council for Democratic Reform (CDR) seized power in 2006, the NPA was again established by King Bhumibol Adulyadej. At his command, the NPA consisted of 1,982 members.

On 17 December 2006, Crown Prince Maha Vajiralongkorn declared the NPA open at the Royal Thai Navy Convention Centre, Bangkok Yai District. On 18 December 2006, 200 of the NPA members were nominated to become the members of the Constitution Drafting Assembly, and the nominations were submitted to the CDR at the Royal Thai Army headquarters, where 100 were selected out of the 200 nominees and became the CDA members.
