= Shunta =

- Gender: Male

Origin
- Origin: Japanese
- Meaning: Different meanings depending on the kanji used

Shunta (written: 駿太, 峻太, 俊太 or 駿汰) is a masculine Japanese given name. Notable people with the name include:

- Shunta Awaka (阿波加 俊太; born 1995), Japanese footballer
- Shunta Gotoh (後藤 駿太; born 1993), Japanese baseball player
- Shunta Nagai (永井 俊太; born 1982), Japanese footballer
- Shunta Nakamura (中村 駿太; born 1999), Japanese footballer
- Shunta Nishiyama (西山 峻太; born 1989), Japanese footballer
- Shunta Shimura (志村 駿太; born 1997), Japanese footballer
- Shunta Takahashi (高橋 駿太; born 1989), Japanese footballer
- Shunta Tanaka (baseball) (田中 俊太; born 1993), Japanese baseball player
- Shunta Tanaka (footballer) (田中 駿汰; born 1997), Japanese footballer
- Shunta Wakamatsu (若松 駿太; born 1995), Japanese baseball player
