= Mathias Gallo Cassarino =

Italian professional Muay Thai fighter

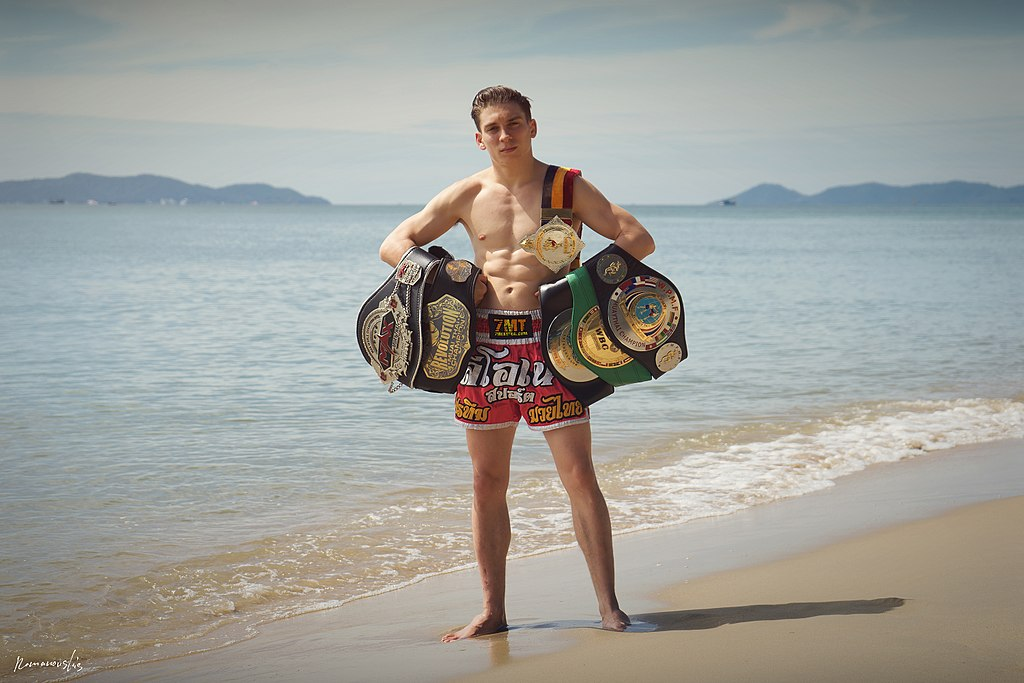
- Gallo Cassarino holding his Muay Thai belts
- Born: 19 December 1992 (age 33); Venaria Reale, Turin, Italy
- Other names: Mathias 7MuayThai (มาเทียส เซเว่นมวยไทย); Mathias MuayFarang; Mathias Sitsongpeenong
- Nationality: Italian
- Height: 1.75 m (5 ft 9 in)
- Weight: 62.0 kg (136.7 lb; 9.76 st)
- Style: Muay Thai
- Fighting out of: Rayong, Thailand; Venaria Reale, Italy
- Team: 7 Muay Thai Gym
- Years active: (2005–present)

Kickboxing record
- Total: 104
- Wins: 60
- By knockout: 20
- Losses: 39
- By knockout: 2
- Draws: 5

Other information
- Website: 7muaythai.com

Mathias Gallo Cassarino (born 19 December 1992) also known as Mathias 7MuayThaigym (Thai: มาเทียส เซเว่นมวยไทย), is an Italian Muay Thai fighter. He is a former WPMF World and WBC International 135 lbs Champion, a Max Muay Thai 62 kg Silver Tournament Champion and a Lumpinee Stadium title challenger.

== Biography ==
Gallo Cassarino was born in Venaria Reale, Turin, Italy on 19 December 1992, and trains at 7 Muay Thai Gym in Rayong province, Thailand. He started fighting professional Muay Thai at 12 years old.

Gallo Cassarino first won a fight at the age of 17, on 15 August 2005. He thereafter won the W.M.C. Muay Thai Against Drugs tournament in Bangkok, on 12 August 2010.
He won a gold medal at the WMF Championship, and a bronze medal at I.F.M.A. World Muaythai Amateur Championships in Bangkok. At the age of 18, Gallo Cassarino fought in the Lumpinee Stadium of Bangkok, winning with a knockout.

On 14 April 2014, Gallo Cassarino went to a draw with Thai champion Rungravee Sasiprapa.

Gallo Cassarino was ranked 2nd on the official WPMF 140 lbs (63.5 kg) world ranking, as of March, 2015; and on 5 April 2015 won the Max Muay Thai 4 Man Silver Tournament, defeating Issam Arabat-Ziane in the semi-final and Puenyai Payyakka Mpan by knockout in round two. He went on to defeat Sasiprapa on 12 September 2015 in Barcelona.

== Titles and accomplishments ==
=== Professional ===
- 2015 Max Muay Thai Silver Tournament -62 kg Champion
- 2013 WPMF World 135 lbs Champion
- 2013 WBC Muay Thai International 130 lbs Champion
- 2012 Revolution Muay Thai 59 kg Champion
- 2011 Prachuap Kirikan Province 125 lbs Champion
- 2010 WMC Muay Thai Against Drugs 58 kg Champion

=== Amateur ===
- 2010 WMF Gold Medal (57 kg)
- 2009 IFMA Bronze Medal (60 kg)

Awards

- 2017 SMM Sport Fight of The Year (vs Ronachai Parnsomboon)

== Muay Thai record ==
Muay Thai Record
60 Wins (20 (T)KOs), 40 Losses, 5 Draws
Date	Result	Opponent	Event	Location	Method	Round	Time
2023-04-29	Loss	(Thailand) Kanongsuek Gor.Kampanat	LWC Super Champ, Lumpinee Stadium	Bangkok, Thailand	KO (Middle kick/broken arm)	3	0:35
For the vacant Lumpinee Stadium Lightweight (135 lbs) title.
2022-11-25	Loss	(Thailand) Mongkolkaew Sor.Sommai	Rajadamnern World Series - Semi Final	Bangkok, Thailand	Decision (Split)	3	3:00
2022-10-21	Loss	(Thailand) Buakhiao Por.Paoin	Rajadamnern World Series - Group Stage	Bangkok, Thailand	Decision	3	3:00
2022-09-16	Win	(Indonesia) Dwi Sukarno	Rajadamnern World Series - Group Stage	Bangkok, Thailand	TKO (leg injury/kick check)	1	
2022-08-12	Win	(Thailand) Flukenoi Kiatfahlikit	Rajadamnern World Series - Group Stage	Bangkok, Thailand	Decision (split)	3	3:00
2020-06-15	Loss	(Thailand) Saeksan Or. Kwanmuang	Palangmai, Rajadamnern Stadium	Bangkok, Thailand	Decision	5	3:00
2022-02-06	Loss	(Thailand) Thepabut Kiatpech	Kiatpetch, Rajadamnern Stadium	Bangkok, Thailand	Decision	5	3:00
2021-11-23	Loss	(Thailand) Lamnamoonlek Or.Atchariya	Lumpinee GoSport	Bangkok, Thailand	Decision	5	3:00
2021-10-03	Win	(Thailand) Nakrob Fairtex	Chang MuayThai Kiatpetch	Buriram province, Thailand	Decision	5	3:00
2020-11-20	Win	(Thailand) Prabsuek Si-Opal	Petchaopraya, Rajadamnern Stadium	Bangkok, Thailand	Decision	5	3:00
2020-10-01	Loss	(Thailand) Petchlamsin Chor Haypayak	Singmawynn, Rajadamnern Stadium	Bangkok, Thailand	Decision	5	3:00
2020-08-06	Loss	(Thailand) Phetmanee Phor.Lakboon	Sor.Sommai, Rajadamnern Stadium	Bangkok, Thailand	Decision	5	3:00
2020-02-14	Win	(Thailand) Chalamsuek Sitanothai	Petchnumnoi, Lumpinee Stadium	Bangkok	TKO	5	3:00
2019-10-12	Win	(Thailand) Darky Lookmakhamwan	Kiatpetch, Lumpinee Stadium	Bangkok	Decision	5	3:00
2019-08-23	Loss	(Thailand) Darky Lookmakhamwan	Kiatpetch, Lumpinee Stadium	Bangkok	Decision	5	3:00
2019-07-20	Loss	(Thailand) Inseethong Or Peerapat	Kiatpetch, Lumpinee Stadium	Bangkok	Decision	5	3:00
2019-07-15	Win	(Thailand) Jaknaronglek Sor.Jullasen	TKO, Lumpinee Stadium	Bangkok	Decision	5	3:00
2019-03-17	Loss	(Thailand) Kiatpetch Suhanpeakmai	Kiatpetch, Or.Tor.Gor3 Stadium	Nonthaburi province, Thailand	Decision	5	3:00
2019-02-18	Win	(Thailand) Jaknaronglek Sor.Jullasen	Kiatpetch, Or.Tor.Gor3 Stadium	Nonthaburi province, Thailand	KO	5	3:00
2018-11-30	Loss	(Thailand) Paedsaenlek Rachanon	Petchnumnoi, Lumpinee Stadium	Bangkok	Decision	5	3:00
2018-08-28	Win	(Thailand) Diesellek MUden	PetchNumnoi, Lumpinee Stadium	Bangkok, Thailand	Decision	5	3:00
2018-06-30	Loss	(Thailand) Pinpetch Sitjaedang	TKO Lumpinee Stadium	Bangkok, Thailand	Decision	5	3:00
2018-05-05	Win	(Thailand) Runachai Parnsomboon	TKO, Lumpinee Stadium	Bangkok	KO	4	2:00
24-02-2018	Win	(Thailand) Mongkolpetch Dabpong 191	Kiatpetch, Lumpinee Stadium	Bangkok	Points	5	3:00
30-12-2017	Loss	(Spain) Victor Conesa	Phetchbuncha Samui Stadium	Ko Samui, Bangkok	TKO (Doctor stoppage)	3	
2017-11-25	Win	(Thailand) Runachai Parnsomboon	Lumpinee TKO – 64,5 Kg	Bangkok	TKO	5	3:00
2017-09-23	Win	(Thailand) Wangtong Sitpanancherng	Lumpinee TKO – 62 Kg	Bangkok	KO	2	1:00
2017-08-20	Win	(Thailand) Yodwatchara Fairtex	ALL STAR FIGHT	Bangkok, Thailand	TKO	2	2:00
2017-06-09	Loss	(Thailand) Petchdamlek Sor Yingjaroenkanchang	Lumpinee Champions show 64 Kg	Bangkok	Decision	5	3:00
2017-01-28	Loss	(France) Brice Delval	Thai Boxe Mania -63,5 kg	Torino, Italy	Decision	5	3:00
2016-11-27	Loss	(Thailand) Rungravee Sasiprapa	Top King World Series 11 -63,5 kg Title Fight	China	Decision	3	3:00
2016-08-26	Loss	(Thailand) Yodtuantong Petchyindee Academy	Toyota Marathon -65 kg	Khon Kaen, Thailand	TKO	1	1:00
2016-08-26	Win	(Thailand) Kiangkrai Tor Silachai	Toyota Marathon -65 kg	Khon Kaen, Thailand	Decision	3	3:00
2016-07-23	Loss	(Japan) Katsushi Nakagawa	NJKF 2016 5th	Tokyo, Japan	Decision	5	3:00
2016-05-29	Win	(Thailand) Markleak Sititisukato	Super Muay Thai	Bangkok, Thailand	Decision	3	3:00
2016-04-12	Win	(Thailand) Tongsak Lukmaklamwan	Lumpinee Stadium	Bangkok, Thailand	TKO	4	2:00
2016-02-28	Draw	(Thailand) Weerachai Meenayothin	Super Muay Thai	Bangkok, Thailand	Decision	3	3:00
2015-12-12	Win	(Thailand) Suedam Khongsittha	Super Muay Thai	Bangkok, Thailand	Decision	3	3:00
2015-30-10	Loss	(Thailand) Aranchai Kiatpatarapan	Toyota Marathon -64 kg	Nakhon Ratchasima, Thailand	Decision	3	3:00
2015-03-10	Win	(Brazil) Jeferson Oliveira	Xtreme Muay Thai 2015	The Venetian Macao, Macao	Decision	3	3:00
2015-12-09	Win	(Thailand) Rungravee Sasiprapa	The Circle	Barcelona, Spain	Decision	3	3:00
2015-25-07	Win	(Russia) Alexander Arutyunyan	WPMF Prince Cup	Bangkok, Thailand	Decision	5	3:00
2015-05-06	Win	(Thailand) Mongkon Kor.Kampanaj	Lumpinee Stadium	Bangkok, Thailand	Decision	5	3:00
2015-04-05	Win	(Thailand) Puenyai Payyakka Mpan	Max Muay Thai	Pattaya, Thailand	KO	2	2:00
2015-04-05	Win	(France) Issam Arabat-Ziane	Max Muay Thai	Pattaya, Thailand	Decision	3	3:00
2015-02-07	Loss	(France) Ayoub El Khaidar	La Nuit des Titans 2015	Tours, France	Decision	5	3:00
2015-01-03	Win	(Cambodia) Cambodian Fighter	Open Stadium	Nakhon Ratchasima, Thailand	KO	3	3:00
2014-10-05	Loss	(Thailand) Tongtang Muangseema	Max Muay Thai World	Pattaya, Thailand	TKO	2	2:00
2014-08-15	Loss	(Thailand) Captain Ken Pinsinchai	H.M. Queens Birthday 2014 - Sanam Luang	Bangkok, Thailand	Decision	5	3:00
Loses WPMF World 135 lbs title.
2014-06-22	Win	(Thailand) Denkiri Sor. Sommai	MAX Muay Thai Live	Pattaya, Thailand	Decision	3	3:00
2014-05-11	Win	(Thailand) Denkiri Sor. Sommai	MAX Muay Thai Live	Bangkok, Thailand	Decision	3	3:00
2014-04-14	Draw	(Thailand) Rungravee Sasiprapa	Combat Banchamek	Surin, Thailand	Decision	3	3:00
2014-03-29	Win	(Thailand) Petchaiya Sor Sirynia	MAX Muay Thai 7	Bangkok, Thailand	Decision	3	3:00
2014-02-07	Loss	(Belarus) Igor Klimovich	RusThai Promotions	Pattaya, Thailand	Decision	3	3:00
2014-01-03	Win	(Thailand) ChokDee Lappet Ubon	Yokkao 6	Pattaya, Thailand	TKO	3	3:00
2013-12-10	Win	(Thailand) Sapanpetch Sit Ititsukato	MAX Muay Thai: The Final Chapter	Khon Khaen, Thailand	Decision	3	3:00
2013-11-10	Loss	(Thailand) Mungkornpet Dragon GYM	Bangla Stadium	Phuket, Thailand	Decision	5	3:00
2013-07-26	Win	(Spain) Juan Mario Kaewsamrit	61st Birth Anniversary of HRH The Crown Prince of Thailand	Bangkok, Thailand	Decision (unanimous)	5	3:00
Wins WPMF World 135 lbs title.
2013-07-05	Loss	(Thailand) Kemtong S. Baramee	Boxing World Pattaya	Pattaya, Thailand	Decision	5	3:00
2013-05-31	Loss	(Uzbekistan) Anvar Boynazarov	Toyota Marathon 63 kg	Kanchanaburi, Thailand	Decision	3	3:00
2013-05-02	Loss	(Thailand) Jomkitti Lukbarnyai	Thepprasit Stadium	Pattaya, Thailand	Decision	5	3:00
2013-04-08	Win	(Russia)	Thepprasit Stadium	Pattaya, Thailand	Decision	5	3:00
2013-01-05	Win	(Cambodia) Van Chan Seth	Ko in Koh Chang	Koh Chang, Thailand	Decision	5	3:00
Wins WBC Muay Thai Intercontinental 130 lbs title.
2012-12-15	Win	(Thailand) Silatong Mor Watanachai	Lumpinee Stadium	Bangkok, Thailand	TKO	5	1:00
2012-11-06	Win	(Japan) Yukiya Nakamura	Lumpinee Stadium	Bangkok, Thailand	Decision	5	3:00
2012-10-09	Win	(Thailand) Nin Lookmakarmwan	Lumpinee Stadium	Bangkok, Thailand	Decision	5	3:00
2012-09-04	Win	(Thailand) Mongkondam Sitwarunee	Lumpinee Stadium	Bangkok, Thailand	Decision	5	3:00
2012-08-01	Win	(Thailand) Insiekaow Kiatboonmee	Boxing World Pattaya	Pattaya, Thailand	TKO	3	2:00
2012-07-07	Win	(Australia) Joe Concha	Revolution Muay Thai	Sydney, Australia	TKO (Cuts)	4	3:00
2012-05-18	Loss	(Thailand) Dieselnoi Sitkhrupian	Lumpinee Stadium	Bangkok, Thailand	Decision	5	3:00
2012-04-17	Loss	(Thailand) Kemarat Sitjapae	Thai Fight Extreme	Pattaya, Thailand	Decision	3	3:00
2012-03-21	Loss	(Vietnam) Nguyễn Trần Duy Nhất	WMF Pro-am World Championship Semifinal	Bangkok, Thailand	Decision	3	3:00
2012-03-21	Win	(Iran) Majid	WMF Pro-am World Championship Quarterfinal	Bangkok, Thailand	Decision	3	3:00
2012-01-21	Win	(Thailand) Sangchan Na Pattaya	Thepprasit Fairtex Stadium Pattaya	Pattaya, Thailand	TKO	3	2:00
2011-12-05	Win	(Thailand) Prabpram Sit Japow	Thepprasit Fairtex Stadium Pattaya	Pattaya, Thailand	TKO	2	1:00
2011-10-07	Win	(Thailand)	Thepprasit Fairtex Stadium Pattaya	Pattaya, Thailand	Decision	5	3:00
2011-09-26	Win	(Thailand) Royto Sor.Sopa	Thepprasit Fairtex Stadium Pattaya	Pattaya, Thailand	Decision	5	3:00
2011-08-12	Loss	(Thailand) Chanachai Or Bor Tor Lampongtammy	Queen's Cup 2011: Thailand vs Challenger	Bangkok, Thailand	Decision	5	3:00
2011-04-15	Loss	(Thailand) Phetbaanrai Or.Wongsri	Lumpinee Stadium	Bangkok, Thailand	TKO (injury)	3	1:30
2011-03-05	Win	(Thailand) Chartpayak Sit-Ajarnmanote	Lumpinee Stadium	Bangkok, Thailand	TKO (low kick)	2	2:10
2011-01-08	Win	(Spain) Urkam Sasiprapa Gym	The Champions Club 6	Pattaya, Thailand	Decision	5	3:00
2010-12-23	Win	(Thailand)	Thepprasit Fairtex Stadium	Pattaya, Thailand	Decision	5	3:00
2010-09-11	Draw	(Cambodia)	Live Cambodian TV	Phnom Pehn, Cambodia	Decision	5	3:00
2010-08-12	Win	(Thailand) Khunlar Chokepreecha	Queen's Cup 2010: Thailand vs Challenger	Bangkok, Thailand	Decision	5	3:00
2010-07-29	Loss	(Thailand)	Thepprasit Fairtex Stadium	Pattaya, Thailand	Decision	5	3:00
2010-06-13	Loss	(Thailand) Eakkarat	Windy Super Fights	Tokyo, Japan	Decision	3	3:00
2010-04-25	Draw	(Japan) Reo	Muay Lok Promotion	Tokyo, Japan	Decision	3	3:00
2010-03-05	Win	(Hong Kong) Jason Wong	Libogen Fight Night part 13	Hong Kong	Decision	5	2:00
2010-01-17	Win	(Israel) Irhi Sit Shuki (Gil Saat)	Tard Khong Panding Stadium	Bangkok, Thailand	Decision	5	3:00
2009-10-10	Loss	(Hong Kong)	Libogen Fight Night	Hong Kong	Decision	3	3:00
2009-08-06	Draw	(Kenya) Leonard Nganga	Thepprasit Fairtex Stadium	Pattaya, Thailand	Decision	5	3:00
2009-07-18	Loss	(Thailand) Eckachai Shothippawan		Pattaya, Thailand	Decision	5	3:00
2009-02-08	Win	(Thailand) Rajchawat S.Jaratfha	Thepprasit Fairtex Stadium	Pattaya, Thailand	TKO	4	2:40
2008-11-17	Win	(Malaysia) Fauzan Zabidi	2009 TM-WMC-KL International Muaythai Challenge	Kuala Lumpur, Malaysia	TKO	4	2:20
2008-09-27	Loss	(Singapore) Richmond Leong	S1 Singapore International Muay Thai Championship	Singapore	Decision	5	3:00
2008-08-07	Loss	(Thailand) Rajchawat S.Jaratfha	Thepprasit Fairtex Stadium	Pattaya, Thailand	Decision	5	3:00
2008-07-21	Loss	(Thailand)	Thepprasit Fairtex Stadium	Pattaya, Thailand	Decision	5	3:00
2008-07-07	Win	(Thailand)	Thepprasit Fairtex Stadium	Pattaya, Thailand	TKO	4	
2007-12-30	Win	(Japan) Por. Pramuk Gym	Thepprasit Fairtex Stadium	Pattaya, Thailand	KO (knee)	5	1:00
2007-07-26	Win	(Netherlands) Albert Kraus Gym	Thepprasit Fairtex Stadium	Pattaya, Thailand	Decision	5	2:00
2007-04-16	Win	(Thailand)	Thepprasit Fairtex Stadium	Pattaya, Thailand	Decision	5	3:00
2005-08-15	Win	(Thailand) Petsiwa	Lamai Stadium	Koh Samui, Thailand	Decision	5	3:00
Legend: Win Loss Draw/No contest Notes
