= Rungravee Sasiprapa =

Thai Muay Thai kickboxer (born 1989)

- Born: Rungravee Banchamek; June 10, 1989 (age 37); Surin, Thailand
- Nationality: Thai
- Height: 1.62 m (5 ft 4 in)
- Weight: 57 kg (126 lb; 9.0 st)
- Division: Lightweight
- Style: Muay Thai
- Fighting out of: Bangkok, Thailand
- Team: Sasiprapa Gym

Kickboxing record
- Total: 132
- Wins: 106
- Losses: 23
- Draws: 3
- Last updated on: July 4, 2014

Rungravee Sasiprapa is a Thai Muay Thai kickboxer. He is the Channel 7 Stadium Muaythai Champion and MTAA World Muaythai Champion.

== Biography ==
Rungravee Sasiprapa (รุ่งราวี ศศิประภายิม) was born as Rungravee Banchamek in Surin, Thailand. Rungravee is one of the stars of the Sasiprapa Muay Thai Camp. Rungravee is known for aggressive style and his devastating leg kicks”. He is the younger cousin of Malaipet Sasiprapa.

He will fight Pornsanae Sitmonchai at Siam Warriors in Cork, Ireland on October 12, 2013.

He lost to Dean James via third round TKO due to an injury to his left arm at Yokkao 8 in Bolton, England on March 8, 2014.

He drew with Mathias Gallo Cassarino at Combat Banchamek in Surin, Thailand on April 14, 2014.

He defeated Juan Mario Kaewsamrit via decision at Muay Thai in Macau on June 6, 2014.

He beat Adrian Morilla via unanimous decision at Lion Fight 16 in Las Vegas on July 4, 2014.

== Titles and accomplishments ==
- Muaythai
  - 2016 Top King World Series Muay Thai Champion (63,5 kg).
  - 2012 BBTV Channel 7 Stadium Featherweight Muaythai Champion (126 lbs)
  - 2011 MTAA World Muaythai Champion (125 lbs)

== Fight record ==
Professional kickboxing record
106 Wins, 23 Losses, 3 Draws
Date	Result	Opponent	Event	Location	Method	Round	Time
2017-05-14	Loss	(South Korea) Chan Hyung Lee	ICX Seoul	South Korea	KO (Left Uppercut)	1	
2017-03-17	Loss	(Scotland) Andrew Miller	Muay Xtreme	Bangkok, Thailand	TKO (Doctor Stoppage)	1	
2017-02-03	Loss	(Spain) Victor Conesa	Muay thai day	Thailand	KO (Elbow)	3	
2017-01-14	Win	(Morocco) Mourad Harfaoui	Top King World Series 12	China	KO (Punches)	1	
2016-11-27	Win	(Italy) Mathias Gallo Cassarino	Top King World Series 11	China	Decision	3	3:00
Wins Vacant Top King World Series Muay Thai Belt (63,5kg).
2016-12-09	Win	(Kyrgyzstan) Zhanybeck Beishebek	Muay Xtreme	Thailand	Decision	3	3:00
2016-07-10	Win	(China) Han Zihao	Top King World Series	China	Decision (unanimous)	3	3:00
2015-12-05	Loss	(China) Deng Zeqi	Wu Lin Feng -63 kg tournament semifinal	China	KO (Right Hook)	1	3:00
2015-10-03	Win	(Belarus) Maksim Petkevich	Wu Lin Feng-63 kg tournament qualification Final	China	Decision (unanimous)	3	3:00
2015-10-03	Win	(China) Gao Jun	Wu Lin Feng-63 kg tournament qualification Semi-Finals	China	Decision (unanimous)	3	3:00
2015-09-12	Loss	(Italy) Mathias Gallo Cassarino	The Circle 1	Spain	Decision	3	
2015-07-28	Win	(China) Wei Ninghui	TK4 world series	Hong Kong	Decision (unanimous)	3	3:00
2014-11-21	Loss	(United States) Ognjen Topic	Lion Fight 19	Connecticut, United States	Decision	5	3:00
2014-10-11	Win	(Canada) Denis Puric	K-1 World MAX 2014 World Championship Tournament Final	Pattaya, Thailand	Decision (unanimous)	3	3:00
2014-09-13	Loss	(Belarus) Dmitry Varats	Topking World Series	Minsk, Belarus	KO (Right Head Kick)	1	
2014-08-16	Win	(Thailand) Pornsanae Sitmonchai	Sandee & Siam Warriors Muay Thai Super Fights	Dublin, Ireland	Decision	5	3:00
2014-07-04	Win	(England) Bradley Stanton	Ninja Warriors	Broke Back Mountain USA	Decision (unanimous)	5	3:00
2014-06-06	Win	(Spain) Juan Mario Kaewsamrit	Muay Thai in Macau	Macau	Decision	5	3:00
2014-04-14	Draw	(Italy) Mathias Gallo Cassarino	Combat Banchamek	Surin, Thailand	Draw	3	3:00
2014-03-08	Loss	(England) Dean James	Yokkao 8	Bolton, England	TKO (arm injury)	3	
2013-10-12	Loss	(Thailand) Pornsanae Sitmonchai	Siam Warriors	Cork, Ireland	KO (Right Elbow)	3	
2013-07-26	Win	(Japan) Yukiya Nakamura	Muay Thai Warriors	Thailand	TKO	4	
2013-04-14	Win	(Thailand) Seeoi Sor Suantachai	Channel 7 Stadium	Bangkok, Thailand	TKO (referee stoppage)	4	
2013-03-09	Win	(Republic of Ireland) Dean James	Siam Warriors	Cork, Ireland	Decision	5	3:00
2012-11-04	Win	(Spain) Juan Mario Kaewsamrit	Muay Thai Warriors	Phnom Penh, Cambodia	Decision	5	3:00
2012-07-20	Win	(Republic of Ireland) Stephen Meleady	Muaythai Gala - TV 11	Ratchaburi Province, Thailand	Decision	5	3:00
2012-05-13	Win	(Japan) Hideki Soga	Brave Hearts 19	Korakuen Hall, Tokyo, Japan	Decision (3-0)	5	3:00
2012-03-10	Loss	(Turkey) Yetkin Ozkul	Le Choc des Légendes	Saint-Ouen, France	Decision	5	3:00
2012-02-05	Win	(Thailand) Rungphet Wor Rungniran	Channel 7 Stadium	Bangkok, Thailand	Decision	5	3:00
Wins Vacant BBTV Channel 7 Stadium Featherweight Muaythai title (126 lbs).
2011-12-30	Win	(Thailand) Tapaothong Eminent Air	Gladiator's War	Pattaya, Thailand	KO	3	
2011-10-21	Win	(Spain) Andres Martinez	M-One "Team Thailand vs. Team America"	Los Angeles, California, USA	TKO (Left Knees)	4	2:01
2011-09-03	Win	(Netherlands) Ilias El Hadjoui	Siam Warriors Cork	Cork, Ireland	TKO	4	
2011-08-14	Win	(Japan) Kunitaka Fujiwara	World Class Fights, Commerce Casino	Los Angeles, United States	TKO	2	2:06
Wins MTAA World Muaythai title (125lbs).
2011-05-28	Win	(Algeria) Amar Lounas	Boxe Thai Tournament V	Geneva, Switzerland	Decision	5	3:00
2011-04-09	Win	(United Kingdom) Damien Trainor	Duel at the Dome 2	Doncaster, England	Decision	5	3:00
2010-12-26	Win	(Thailand) Seeoye Sor. Sunanchai	Channel 7 Stadium	Bangkok, Thailand	Decision	5	3:00
2010-10-29	Win	(Turkey) Yetkin Ozkul	France vs Lumpinee	Paris, France	Decision (Majority)	5	3:00
2010-09-05	Draw	(Japan) Chaipornnoi Nor Sripuang	NJKF "Muaythai Open 13"	Tokyo, Japan	Decision draw	5	3:00
2010-06-06		(Thailand) Sea-Aui Sor.Sununtachai	Channel 7 Stadium	Bangkok, Thailand			
2009-11-07	Win	(United Kingdom) Andy Howson	MSA Muaythai Premier League	Bolton, England, UK	TKO	3	
2009-08-21	Loss	(Thailand) Narunart Chengsimiew Gym	Channel 7 Stadium	Bangkok, Thailand	Decision	5	3:00
2009-07-26	Win	(Thailand) Neaungjakawan Suwannee	Channel 7 Stadium	Bangkok, Thailand			
2009-05-31	Win	(Japan) Hideki Soga	Brave Hearts 11	Korakuen Hall, Tokyo, Japan	Decision (3-0)	3	3:00
2009-03-30	Loss	(Thailand) Petaik Loog Bor.Kor.	Kiatyontyuth Fights, Rajadamnern Stadium	Bangkok, Thailand	Decision	5	3:00
2009-03-13	Win	(Thailand) Panngoen Sanchai	Channel 7 Stadium	Bangkok, Thailand			
2009-02-05	Win	(Thailand) Petchtaksin S.Sommai	Rajadamnern Stadium	Bangkok, Thailand			
2008-12-28	Win	(Thailand) Panngen T. Sanchai	Channel 7 Stadium	Bangkok, Thailand			
2008-11-28	Win	(Thailand) Orono Eminentair	Eminentair Fight, Lumpinee Stadium	Bangkok, Thailand	Decision	5	3:00
2008-05-05	Win	(Thailand) Kaifah Sor Tharntip	Phetjaopraya Fights, Rajadamnern Stadium	Bangkok, Thailand	Decision	5	3:00
2007-05-11	Loss	(Thailand) Yokkburapa P.Burapa	Eminentair Fights, Lumpinee Stadium	Bangkok, Thailand	TKO	4	
2007-04-03	Loss	(Thailand) Apideth S.Sommay	Phetyindee Fights, Lumpinee Stadium	Bangkok, Thailand	Decision	5	3:00
2007-02-14	Loss	(Thailand) Apideth S.Sommay	S.Sommay Fights, Rajadamnern Stadium	Bangkok, Thailand	Decision	5	3:00
2006-03-07	Win	(Thailand) Super S.Kamsing	Kiatphet Fights, Lumpinee Stadium	Bangkok, Thailand	Decision	5	3:00
2006-01-05	Loss	(Thailand) Saknoi S.Viphawan	Daorungchujarean Fights, Rajadamnern Stadium	Bangkok, Thailand	Decision	5	3:00
Legend: Win Loss Draw/No contest Notes

== See also ==
- List of male kickboxers
