= Sansanee Sthirasuta =

Thai Buddhist nun (1953–2021)

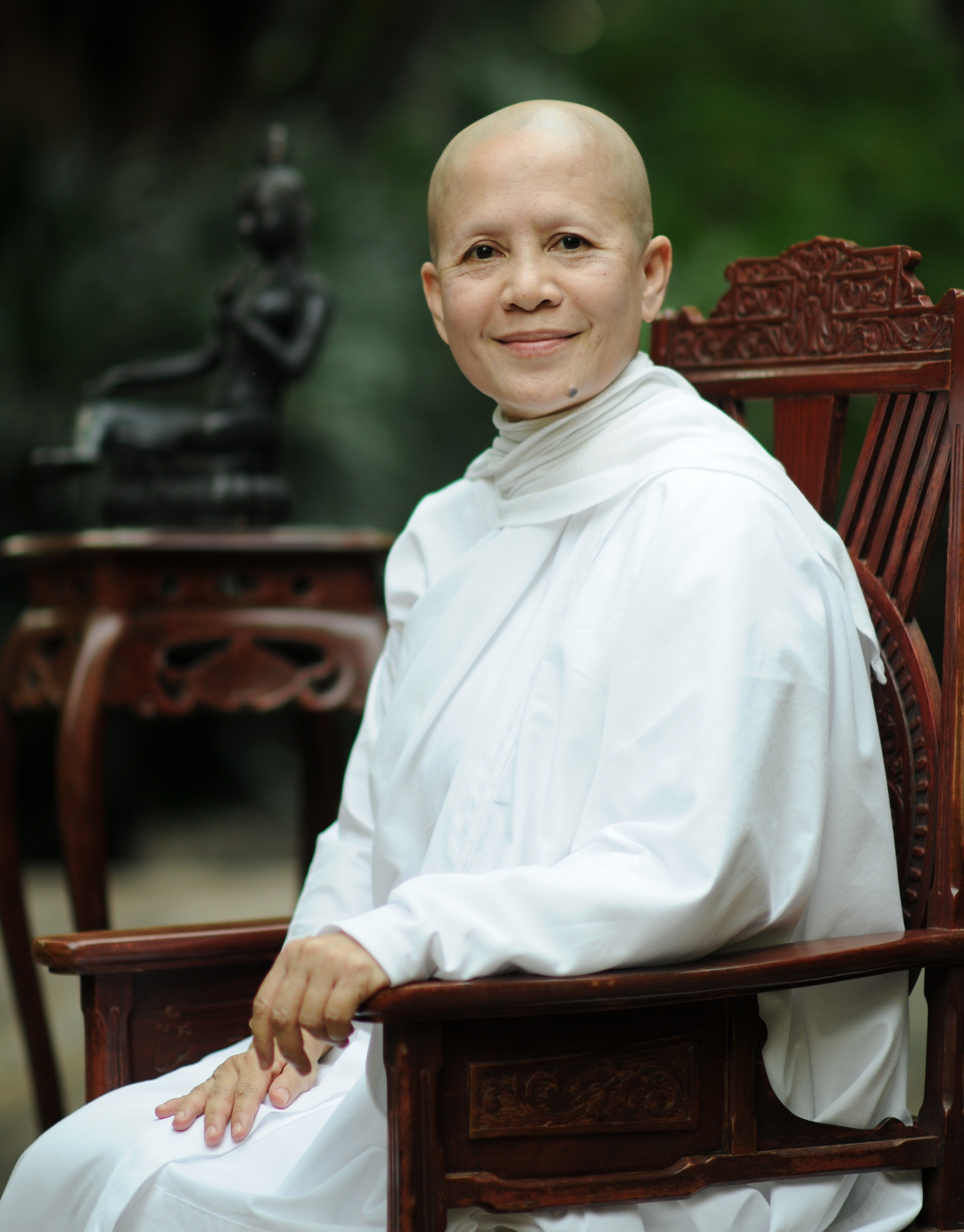
Mae Chee Sansanee in 2011

Sansanee Sthirasuta (Thai: ศันสนีย์ เสถียรสุต, pronounced [sǎn.sa.nīː sa.tʰǐa.ra.sùt]; 1953 – 7 December 2021), better known as Mae Chee Sansanee, was a Thai Theravada Buddhist spiritual teacher and maechi (Thai Buddhist nun). She was known for teaching meditative practices and encouraging the role of women in Buddhism, and was the founder of Sathira-Dhammasthan, a learning centre and spiritual retreat in Bangkok.

Sansanee was born Sansanee Panyasiri (ปัญญศิริ). She left her hometown in Ayutthaya province for Bangkok at the age of 15, becoming a model and television personality. She was briefly romantically involved with millionaire socialite Sthira Sthirasuta, but after finding out he was already married eventually decided to abandon worldly life and become a maechi (nun) at the age of 27. She founded Sathira-Dhammasthan in 1987, with Sthira as a benefactor, and initially focused on providing refuge for victimized women.
