= Royal Turf Club of Thailand =

Sports club and former racecourse in Thailand

Coordinates: 13°45′48″N 100°31′03″E

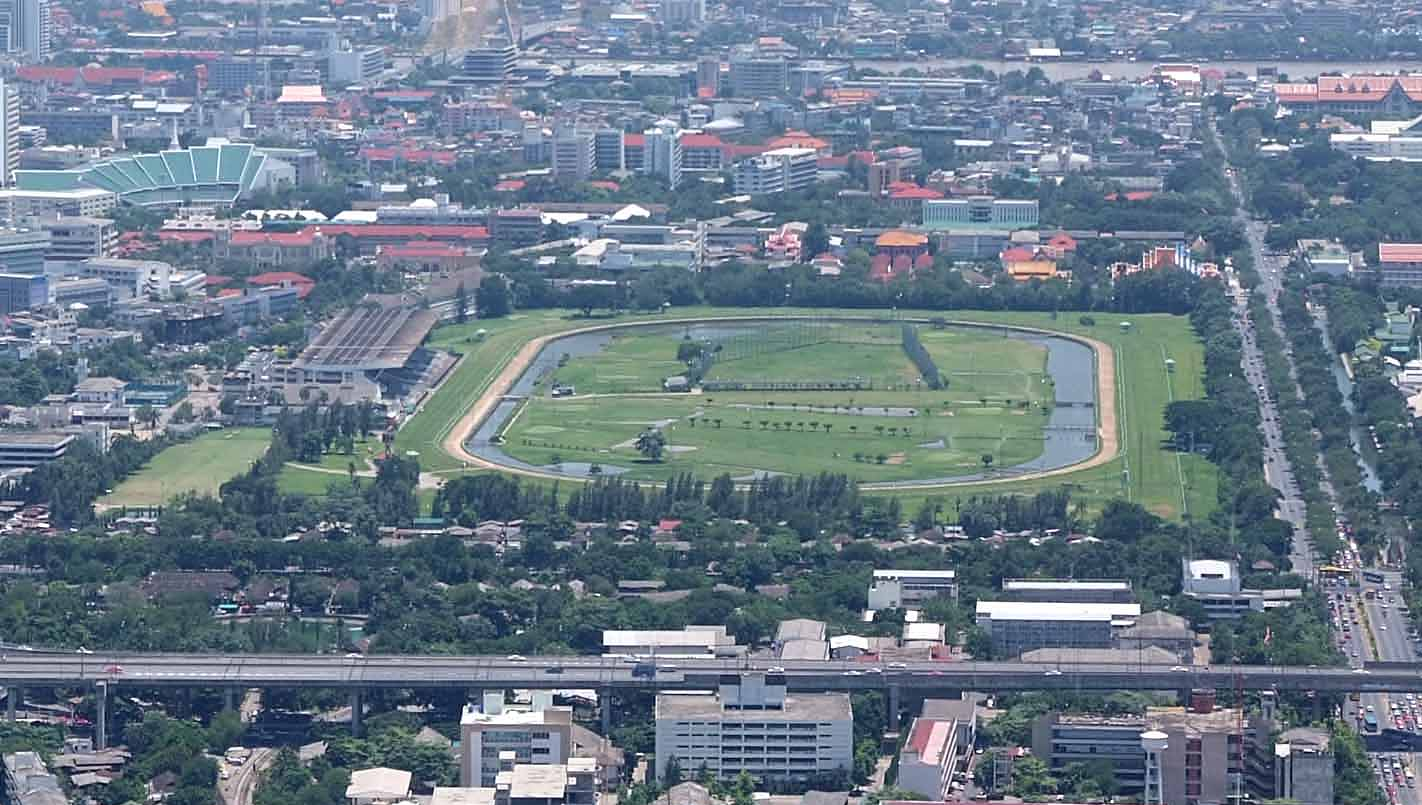
The Royal Turf Club, seen from Baiyoke Tower II in 2009

The Royal Turf Club of Thailand under Royal Patronage (Thai: ราชตฤณมัยสมาคมแห่งประเทศไทย ในพระบรมราชูปถัมภ์) (Note: RTGS: Ratchatrinnamai Samakhom Haeng Prathet Thai Nai Phra Borommarachupatham, pronounced [râːt.t͡ɕʰā.trīn.nā.māj sā.māː.kʰōm hɛ̀ŋ prā.tʰêːt tʰāj nāj pʰráʔ bɔ̄ː.rōm.mā.rāː.t͡ɕʰūː.pā.tʰǎm]) is a sports club in Thailand, formerly located at its historic horse racing venue in Bangkok, which was commonly known as the Nang Loeng Racecourse (สนามม้านางเลิ้ง). (Note: RTGS: Sanam Ma Nang Loeng, pronounced [sā.nǎːm máː nāːŋ lɤ́ːŋ]) It was founded in 1916 by a group of aristocrats as an alternative to the Royal Bangkok Sports Club, and became highly popular during the first half of the twentieth century. Horse racing in Thailand declined in popularity towards the end of the twentieth century, and the Royal Turf Club likewise saw large falls in spectator numbers. Nevertheless, it continued to hold races every other Sunday, until its land lease was terminated by the Crown Property Bureau in 2018 and the site redeveloped into King Rama IX Memorial Park. The club was long known as a site of business and political networking among the elite, especially senior military figures.

== History ==
=== Early days ===
Horse racing was introduced to Thailand (then known as Siam) following King Chulalongkorn (Rama V)'s visit to Europe in 1897. Regular races were held at Gymkhana Club, later the Royal Bangkok Sports Club (RBSC), in Pathum Wan District. The King sponsored the sport, presenting a royal cup for annual competitions.

These exclusive clubs served both Western expatriates and the Thai aristocracy. By 1916, in the reign of King Vajiravudh, conflicts arose between them at the RBSC due to expatriates' introduction of new varieties of sports causing funds to be diverted from horse-racing prize money. Two Thai club committee members, Phraya Atthakanprasit and Phraya Pradiphatphuban, sought to establish a new club, and secured the King's permission to build a racecourse on royally owned land in the Nang Loeng area. King Vajiravudh opened the racecourse on 18 December 1916, naming it the Royal Turf Club and granting it royal patronage. In 1919, the King granted a golden cup, known as the Derby Cup, to be awarded to the winner. The club would also become known as Sanam Thai (the "Thai racecourse"), as opposed to the Sanam Farang ("Farang racecourse") at the RBSC, reflecting the split of the clubs' clients between Thais and Westerners.

One of stated goals of the club was to promote horse breeding, and the club ordered fifty mares from Australia and two Arabian stallions from England for breeding. It also sponsored students to attend veterinary school in the United Kingdom.

Unlike other traditional forms of gambling, horse racing was originally seen as a civilized activity and was (and is) one of the few venues in which gambling was legally permitted in the country. Originally confined to expatriates and the upper class, interest in the sport later spread to other groups in society and horse racing rapidly gained popularity in the 1920s. This eventually led to the sport taking on a negative image. By 1949, when two races were being held every weekend both at the Royal Turf Club and the RBSC, the government, concerned of excessive gambling among the poor, ordered them to be limited only to Saturday, alternating each month between the clubs. (This was later relaxed to both courses each holding one race per week, then tightened to once a week alternating between the clubs in 1982.)

=== Decline and demolition ===
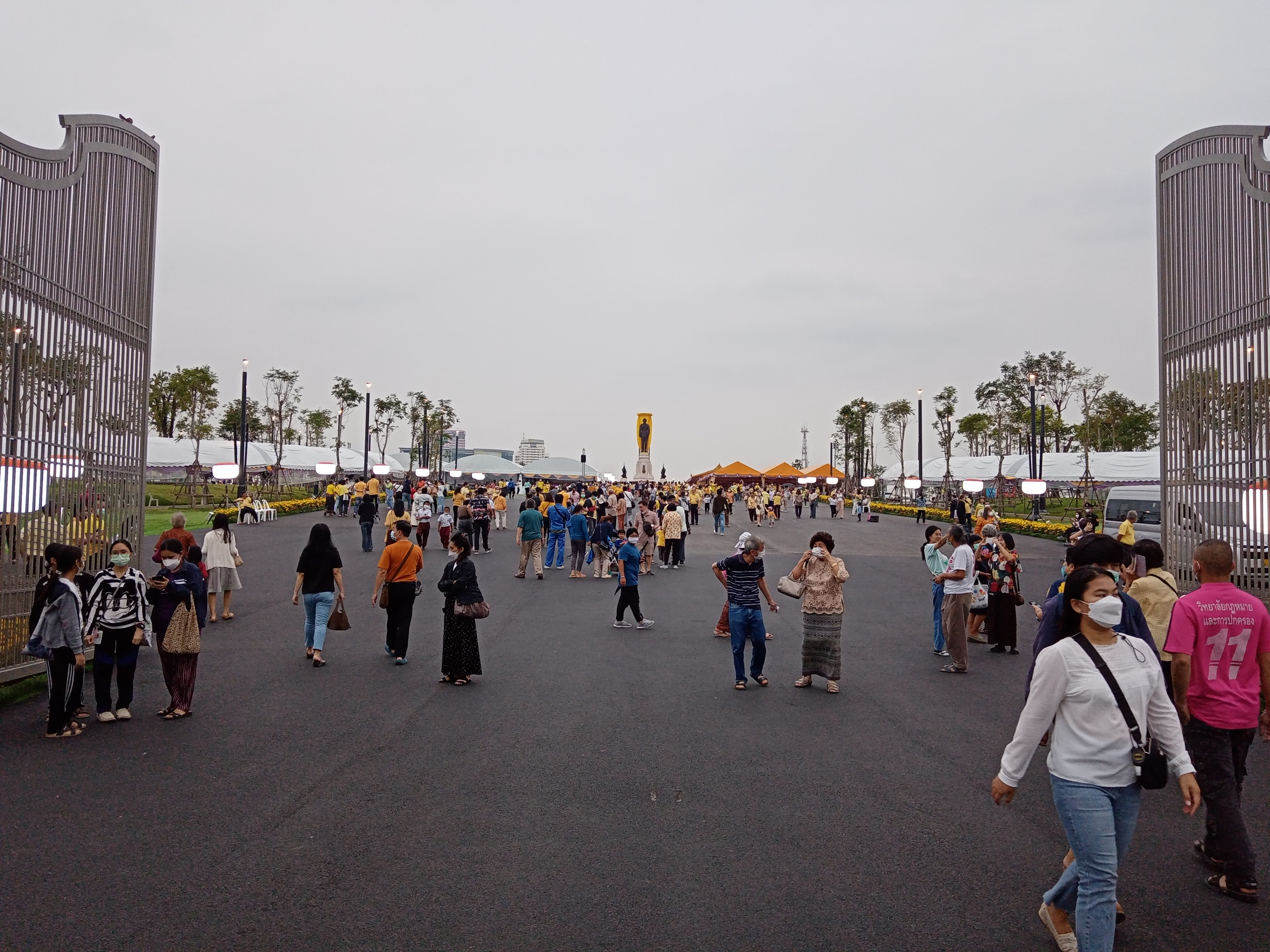
Main gate of King Rama IX Memorial Park (2022)

By the end of the twentieth century, horse racing was in a long gradual decline. The public mostly saw racecourses as gambling venues where immoral activities took place, and other (illegal) forms of sport gambling also ate into their revenues. The Royal Turf Club saw dwindling spectator numbers (audiences were estimated at 5,000 in 2018, down from previous numbers of up to 30,000), although the races still served as a venue for business and political networking. Relocation of the Nang Loeng Racecourse to Pattaya was suggested in the late 1990s and early 2000s, but was not acted upon due to cost concerns. Renovations to make the club more attractive to young people and local communities were also considered in 2017, but had not yet taken shape when the Crown Property Bureau, which owned the land, announced in April 2018 that it was evicting the club, whose latest lease had expired in 2000. The final race took place on 16 September 2018. At the club's annual general meeting on 22 September, the incoming executive board announced that the club—which had an outstanding tax debt of about 1.5 billion baht (US$46M in 2018) accumulated from 2000 to 2015—would seek to build a new site and continue operations. The grounds were razed for redevelopment as a park commemorating the late King Bhumibol Adulyadej, the designs of which were unveiled by the Bureau of the Royal Household in 2021. Construction of the new site, to be known as King Rama IX Memorial Park, is scheduled to take place until 2024.

== Facilities ==
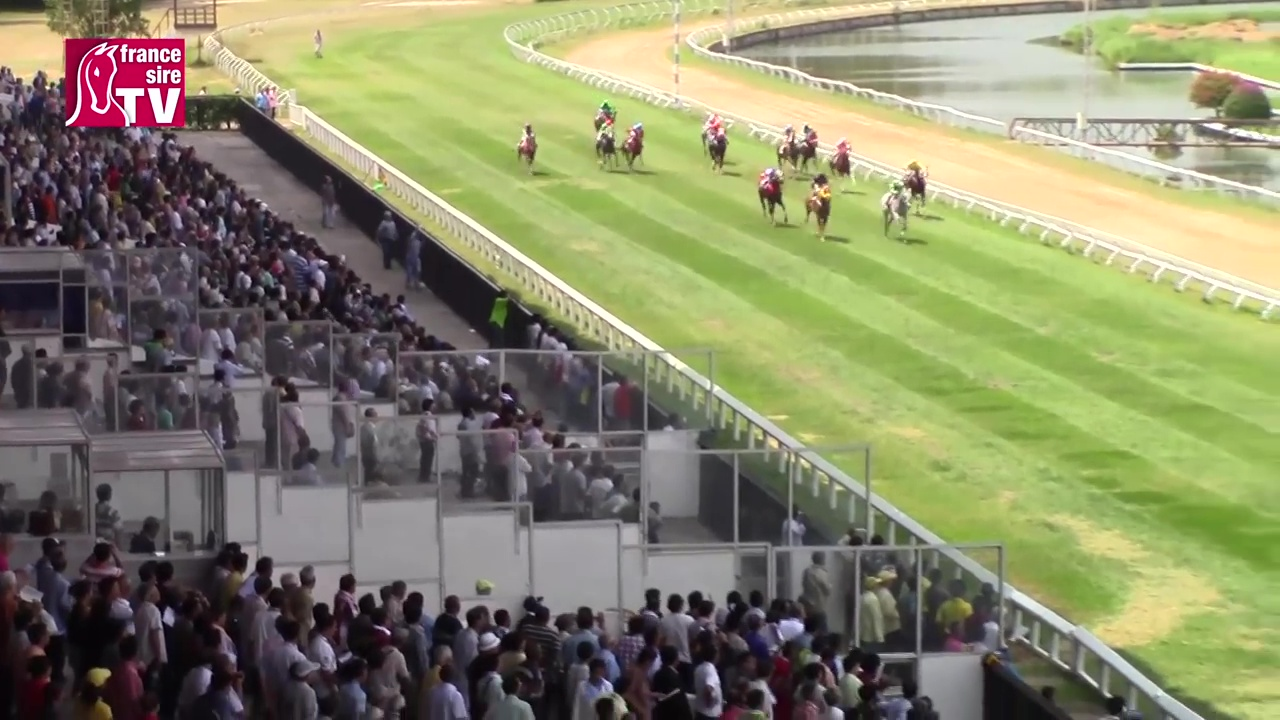
A race at the Royal Turf Club

The club covered about 200 rai (32 ha; 79 acres) of land between Phitsanulok, Rama V, Si Ayutthaya and Sawankhalok Roads, and featured facilities including, in addition to the racecourse, a golf course (the Royal Dusit Golf Club), a swimming pool, tennis courts, a fitness centre and dining services.

One of the original buildings on the site is the multi-purpose hall, believed to have been King Vajiravudh's royal stable. However, it is more likely to have been an indoor dressage practice arena. The building is of a rectangular floor plan, decorated in Neoclassical style with stucco and mouldings. It features a large central hall, covered by a steel tied truss roof structure with no pillar support. The building, which later housed badminton courts, received the ASA Architectural Conservation Award in 1984 and is listed as an unregistered ancient monument by the Fine Arts Department.

== Races ==
By the time of its closure, races at the Nang Loeng Racecourse generally took place every other Sunday afternoon, alternating with the RBSC. Exceptions occurred when an uposatha (Buddhist sabbath) day fell on Sunday, in which case the race would be held on Saturday instead. Tickets were sold in three separate tiers, granting access to the lower and upper levels of the grandstand, or an air-conditioned VIP box. Admissions were limited to people 20 years and older. The majority of the audience consisted of older men (most aged 45–80, according to an estimate), many of whom have been attending the races every week for much of their lifetime.

Just outside the racecourse, vendors sold food and drink, cigarettes, programme booklets, and provide binoculars for rent. Rental shoes also used to be a distinctive business at the racecourse, as its rules required proper dress and open shoes were not allowed. However, in later times the rule was not strictly enforced, and most rentals subsequently disappeared.

The club hosted three major events annually: the Derby Cup in January, the President Cup in June, and the Ramraghob Cup in November.

== Politics ==
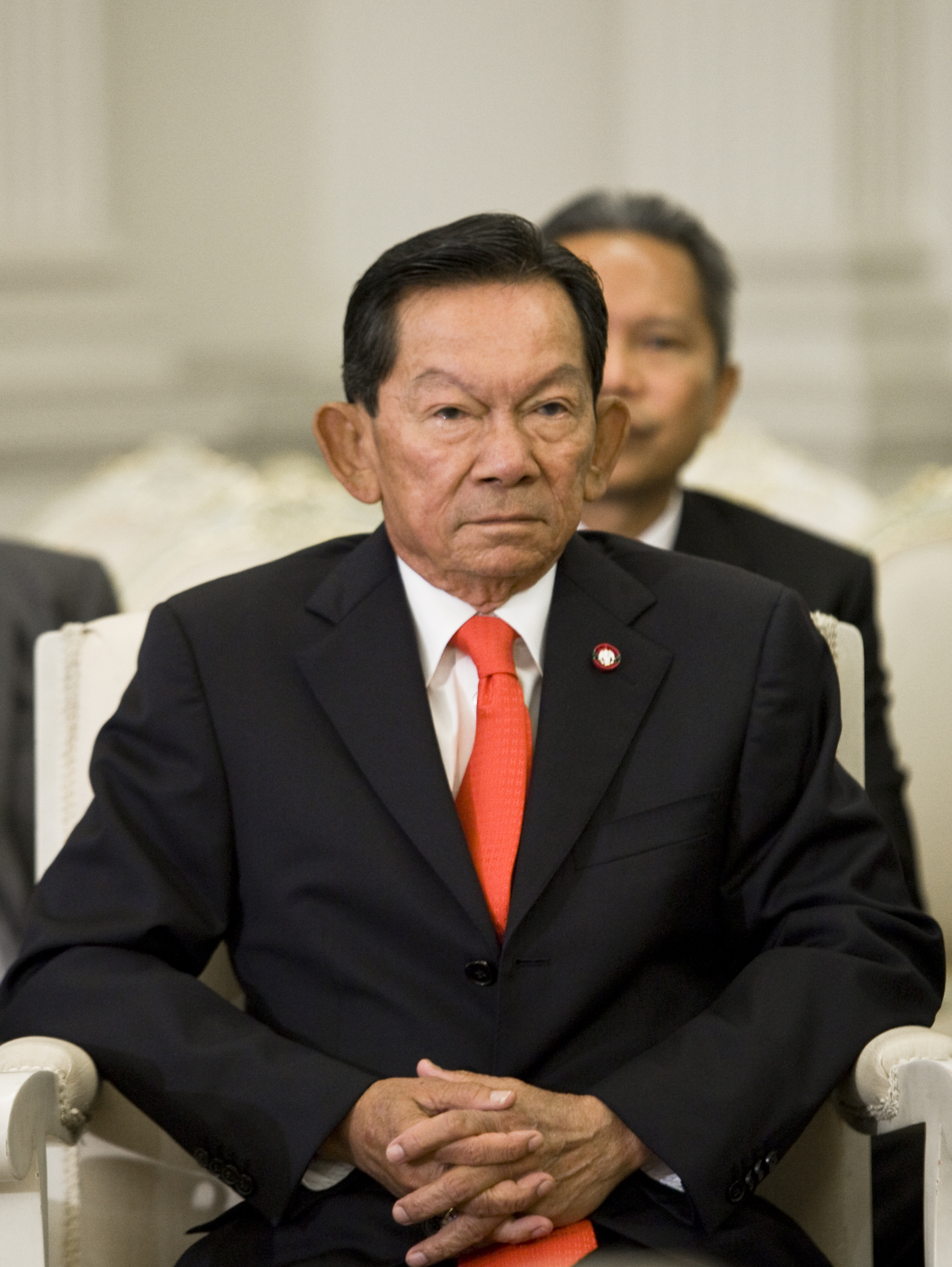
Veteran politician Maj. Gen. Sanan Kachornprasart frequently used the club for his political activities.

The Nang Loeng Racecourse long served as a site of political activity. Physically, the racecourse itself served as the site where, following the 14 October uprising in 1973, the National General Assembly was convened to select members for the drafting of a new constitution. Forty years later, in 2012, during the prelude to the following year's political crisis, the anti-government group Pitak Siam used the racecourse for its demonstrations. The group's leader, Gen. Boonlert Kaewprasit, was in fact also the club's honorary secretary (its main administrative post) at the time.

The Royal Turf Club's administration was mostly dominated by senior military officers. In the 1960s, the old elite's position within the club began to give way to the ruling class of the time. The country was then under the dictatorships of Sarit Thanarat and Thanom Kittikachorn, and army generals Kris Sivara, Surachit Charuserani and Chote Hiranyasthiti came to control the club's administration. Following the 1973 uprising, control was handed to Boonwong Amatayakul and Gen. Chalard Hiranyasiri, who was later succeeded by his close subordinates Maj. Gen. Sanan Kachornprasart and then Gen. Boonlert. In 2016, Gen. Vitch Devahasdin replaced Boonlert as honorary secretary.

The club typically demonstrated a high level of cronyism in its administration, which controlled its large amounts of cash flow. Additionally, the races also served as a venue for networking among politicians and business people, who comprised most of the participating stable owners. Most of the provincial stable owners were also honorary members of the Royal Turf Club, making the club effectively the central hub among all of the country's racecourses.
