= List of ONE Championship alumni =

This is a list of former employees of the professional mixed martial arts promotion ONE Championship (previously known as ONE Fighting Championship and ONE FC). The fighters are listed in order by weight class.

== Alumni (Mixed Martial Arts) ==
	Name	Weight class	ONE record	Ref
Brazil	Rolles Gracie Jr.	Heavyweight	2–0	
United States	Tony Johnson	Heavyweight	1–1	
United States	Tim Sylvia	Heavyweight	0–1 (1)	
Belarus	Andrei Arlovski	Heavyweight	0–0 (1)	
Hong Kong	Alain Ngalani	Heavyweight; Cruiserweight	4–6 (2)	
United States	Brandon Vera	Heavyweight; Cruiserweight	4–3	
England	James McSweeney	Heavyweight; Cruiserweight	2–1	
Brazil	Roger Gracie	Cruiserweight	2–0	
Brazil	Renato Sobral	Cruiserweight	1–0	
Japan	Tatsuya Mizuno	Middleweight; Cruiserweight	3–4	
Poland	Marcin Prachnio	Middleweight; Cruiserweight	4–0	
Netherlands	Reinier de Ridder	Middleweight; Cruiserweight	7–2 (0–1–1 grappling record)	
Russia	Vitaly Bigdash	Middleweight	5–3	
Netherlands	Melvin Manhoef	Middleweight	1–1 (1)	
Brazil	Luís Santos	Middleweight; Welterweight	5–3 (1)	
Japan	Yushin Okami	Middleweight; Welterweight	1–3	
United States	Brock Larson	Middleweight; Welterweight	1–1	
Japan	Daichi Abe	Middleweight; Welterweight	0–2	
Brazil	Yuri Simões	Middleweight; Welterweight	0–2	
United States	Ben Askren	Welterweight	6–0 (1)	
Russia	Murad Ramazanov	Welterweight	3–0 (1)	
United States	Phil Baroni	Welterweight	1–2	
Brazil	Cosmo Alexandre	Welterweight	1–0	
Brazil	Renzo Gracie	Welterweight	1–0	
Russia	Rustam Khabilov	Welterweight	1–0	
Japan	Yoshiyuki Yoshida	Welterweight	1–0	
Japan	Nobutatsu Suzuki	Welterweight; Lightweight	2–2	
(South Korea)	Yoshihiro Akiyama	Welterweight; Lightweight	2–1	
United States	Roger Huerta	Lightweight	2–3	
United States	Caros Fodor	Lightweight	3–1	
Iran	Kamal Shalorus	Lightweight	2–2	
Japan	Kazuki Tokudome	Lightweight	2–2	
South Africa	Vuyisile Colossa	Lightweight	2–1	
United States	Eddie Alvarez	Lightweight	1–2 (1)	
Thailand	Shannon Wiratchai	Lightweight; Featherweight	9–6 (1)	
Japan	Kotetsu Boku	Lightweight; Featherweight	6–7	
Mongolia	Jadamba Narantungalag	Featherweight	6–3	
Brazil	Herbert Burns	Featherweight	5–2	
Pakistan	Bashir Ahmad	Featherweight	3–3	
Japan	Koyomi Matsushima	Featherweight	3–2	
Malaysia	Melvin Yeoh	Featherweight	1–2	
Japan	Kazunori Yokota	Featherweight	0–3	
Russia	Movlid Khaybulaev	Featherweight	1–0	
Brazil	Bruno Pucci	Featherweight; Bantamweight	5–6	
United States	Jens Pulver	Featherweight; Bantamweight	1–2	
Brazil	Bibiano Fernandes	Bantamweight	12–3	
Japan	Masakazu Imanari	Bantamweight	3–3	
Thailand	Yodsanan Sityodtong	Bantamweight	4–1	
Japan	Masakatsu Ueda	Bantamweight	3–1	
Japan	Koetsu Okazaki	Bantamweight	2–2	
China	Heili Alateng	Bantamweight	1–0	
China	Song Yadong	Bantamweight	0–1	
United States	Demetrious Johnson	Flyweight	5–0	
Japan	Yasuhiro Urushitani	Flyweight	1–1	
Myanmar	Mite Yine	Flyweight	1–1	
Thailand	Dejdamrong Sor Amnuaysirichoke	Strawweight	12–7	
Japan	Yoshitaka Naito	Strawweight	5–4	
Japan	Namiki Kawahara	Strawweight	0–2	
Malaysia	Ann Osman	Women's Flyweight	5–4	
(Philippines)	Ana Julaton	Women's Flyweight	2–2	
Brazil	Michelle Nicolini	Women's Strawweight	4–2	
(Singapore)	Angela Lee	Women's Strawweight; Women's Atomweight	11–3	
Indonesia	Priscilla Hertati Lumban Gaol	Women's Atomweight	7–5	
Japan	Mei Yamaguchi	Women's Atomweight	6–6	
(Vietnam)	Bi Nguyen	Women's Atomweight	2–5	
India	Jeet Toshi	Women's Atomweight	1–3	
(Singapore)	Victoria Lee	Women's Atomweight	3–0	
Cambodia	Tharoth Sam	Women's Atomweight	1–2	
Philippines	Jujeath Nagaowa	Women's Atomweight	2–0	

== Alumni (Kickboxing & Muay Thai) ==
	Name	Weight class	ONE record	Ref
Cameroon	Alain Ngalani	Heavyweight	0–1 (1)	
Netherlands	Errol Zimmerman	Heavyweight	0–1	
Netherlands	Ismael Londt	Heavyweight	0–1	
Morocco	Tarik Khbabez	Heavyweight; Light Heavyweight	4–1	
Romania	Bogdan Stoica	Light Heavyweight	0–1	
Brazil	Cosmo Alexandre	Welterweight	2–1	
Netherlands	Santino Verbeek	Welterweight	1–1	
Italy	Mustapha Haida	Lightweight	1–3	
Germany	Arian Sadiković	Lightweight	2–1	
Australia	John Wayne Parr	Lightweight	0–2	
Netherlands	Marouan Toutouh	Lightweight	0–1	
Thailand	Petchmorakot Petchyindee Academy	Featherweight	7–2 (1)	
France	Samy Sana	Featherweight	3–5	
Thailand	Yodsanklai Fairtex	Featherweight	3–3	
Netherlands	Mohammed Boutasaa	Featherweight	3–2	
Germany	Enriko Kehl	Featherweight	2–3	
(Georgia (country))	Davit Kiria	Featherweight	1–4	
Netherlands	Andy Souwer	Featherweight	1–3	
Netherlands	Tayfun Özcan	Featherweight	1–3	
Armenia	Armen Petrosyan	Featherweight	0–3	
Russia	Dzhabar Askerov	Featherweight	1–1	
Democratic Republic of the Congo	Chris Ngimbi	Featherweight	1–1	
Thailand	Sagetdao Petpayathai	Featherweight	1–0	
Thailand	Rodlek P.K. Saenchaimuaythaigym	Bantamweight	4–3	
Thailand	Capitan Petchyindee Academy	Bantamweight	3–2	
Japan	Hiroaki Suzuki	Bantamweight	2–2	
Serbia	Ognjen Topic	Bantamweight	1–3	
Thailand	Yodpanomrung Jitmuangnon	Bantamweight	1–2	
Thailand	Kongsak P.K.Saenchaimuaythaigym	Bantamweight	2–0	
France	Adam Noi	Bantamweight	1–1	
Thailand	Rittewada Petchyindee Academy	Bantamweight	1–1	
France	Brice Delval	Bantamweight	0–2	
China	Qiu Jianliang	Bantamweight	0–1	
France	Azize Hlali	Bantamweight	0–1	
France	Bobo Sacko	Bantamweight	0–1	
Thailand	Petchdam Petchyindee Academy	Flyweight	5–3	
Thailand	Mongkolpetch Petchyindee Academy	Flyweight	4–1	
Cyprus	Michael Savvas	Flyweight	2–3	
Thailand	Singtongnoi Por.Telakun	Flyweight	2–2	
Spain	Daniel Puertas Gallardo	Flyweight	1–2	
China	Wang Wenfeng	Flyweight	1–2	
France	Hakim Hamech	Flyweight	1–1	
Japan	Masahide Kudo	Flyweight	0–2	
Suriname	Sergio Wielzen	Flyweight	0–2	
China	Wang Junguang	Strawweight	1–2	
France	Daren Rolland	Strawweight	0–2	
England	Andy Howson	Strawweight	0–1	
Argentina	Federico Roma	Strawweight	0–1	
Germany	Christina Breuer	Women's Featherweight	1–0	
Netherlands	Jorina Baars	Women's Featherweight	0–1	
England	Iman Barlow	Women's Strawweight	2–0	
(United States)	Janet Todd	Women's Atomweight	7–3	
Taiwan	Kai Ting Chuang	Women's Atomweight	1–2	
Norway	Anne Line Hogstad	Women's Atomweight	1–1	
Japan	Ayaka Miyauchi	Women's Atomweight	0–1	
Malaysia	Jordan Boy	Bantamweight	2-5	

== See also ==
- List of current ONE fighters
- List of ONE Championship champions
- List of ONE Championship events
