= Christian Lee (fighter) =

American and Canadian mixed martial artist

- Born: Christian Seung Yong Lee; June 21, 1998 (age 28); Vancouver, British Columbia, Canada
- Native name: 李胜龙 (Li Shenglong) 이승용 (Lee Seung-yong)
- Nickname: The Warrior
- Nationality: American and Canadian
- Height: 5 ft 10 in (1.78 m)
- Weight: 185 lb (84 kg; 13 st)
- Division: Featherweight (2015–2019); Lightweight (2019–present); Welterweight (2022–present)
- Reach: 76 in (193 cm)
- Style: Pankration, Taekwondo, BJJ, Muay Thai, Wrestling
- Stance: Orthodox
- Fighting out of: Tanjong Katong, Singapore
- Team: Evolve MMA; United MMA
- Rank: Black belt in Brazilian Jiu-Jitsu under Mike Fowler
- Years active: 2015–present

Mixed martial arts record
- Total: 24
- Wins: 18
- By knockout: 13
- By submission: 4
- By decision: 1
- Losses: 5
- By submission: 2
- By decision: 2
- By disqualification: 1
- No contests: 1

Other information
- Notable relatives: Angela Lee (Sister); Victoria Lee (Sister)
- Mixed martial arts record from Sherdog

Christian Lee (Chinese: 李胜龙, Korean: 이승용, born June 21, 1998) is a Canadian-born American mixed martial artist who currently competes in the lightweight and welterweight divisions of ONE Championship. He is the former ONE Welterweight World Champion and a former two-time ONE Lightweight World Champion. Lee is the fourth two-division champion in ONE history and holds the promotion's records for most wins (17), most finishes (16), and most knockouts (12). He was also the winner of the 2019 ONE Lightweight World Grand Prix.

Lee is also a former pankrationist, where he was a multiple-time national and world champion, as well as a submission grappler. On May 17, 2019, Lee defeated Shinya Aoki to win the ONE Lightweight World Championship for the first time. With his older sister Angela already holding the ONE Atomweight World Championship, they became the first brother-sister pair of mixed martial arts world champions. Their younger sister Victoria was also a mixed martial artist.

== Background ==
Born in Vancouver to a Chinese-Singaporean father and a South Korean-born Canadian mother, Lee moved to Hawaii when he was five years old. As both his parents are decorated martial artists, Lee started training in the sport from a young age. Lee's older sister Angela (born July 8, 1996, in Vancouver) is also an MMA fighter with ONE Championship and his younger brother, Adrian (born in Waipahu), also trains in martial arts. Lee's younger sister Victoria, who was also a mixed martial artist signed to ONE, died in 2022 at the age of 18.

At the 2012 USA Pankration national championships, Lee won two national titles and one silver medal. He also won the World Championship in the MMA division at the 2012 World Pangration Athlima Federation Championships.

== Mixed martial arts career ==
Lee trains out of United MMA in Waipahu, Hawaii and Evolve MMA in Singapore, alongside his teammate and sister, Angela and her husband (and also his brother-in-law), Bruno Pucci, who also competes in ONE Championship's bantamweight division.

Lee made his amateur debut in 2015 at Star Elite Cage Fighting, where he defeated Avery Sanchis via first-round submission.

=== ONE Championship ===
At the age of 17, Lee signed with ONE Championship and made his promotional debut at ONE: Spirit of Champions on December 11, 2015, earning his first career win with a 29-second TKO of David Meak.

Lee followed that up by submitting Mahmoud Deab Mohamed in the first round with a kimura at ONE: Clash Of Heroes on January 29, 2016.

On March 18, 2016, he earned another first-round win against Anthony Engelen at ONE: Union of the Warriors with a TKO stoppage by punches and elbow in a catchweight bout.

At ONE: Ascent To Power on May 6, 2016, Lee improved to 4-0 when he submitted Cary Bullos in the opening round with a brabo choke.

Lee continued his streak of first-round finishes when he stopped Rocky Batolbatol by TKO at ONE: Kingdom Of Champions on May 27, 2016.

In his next match on August 13, 2016, Lee suffered his first professional defeat to rising featherweight Martin Nguyen at ONE Championship: Heroes of the World, losing in the first-round via a guillotine choke.

Lee rebounded by defeating Wan Jianping with a first-round TKO at ONE Championship: Kings of Destiny on April 21, 2017.

For the first time in his career, Lee was pushed to three rounds before finally submitting Keanu Subba with an armbar at ONE Championship: Quest for Greatness on August 18, 2017.

On December 9, 2017, at ONE Championship: Warriors of the World, Lee defeated former ONE Lightweight World Champion Kotetsu Boku in the first round by TKO.

Lee submitted Kazunori Yokota in the second round at ONE Championship: Visions of Victory on March 9, 2018, to clinch his fourth straight win.

==== ONE Featherweight Championship contender ====
After his strong run of performances, Lee would earn a title shot against ONE Featherweight World Champion Martin Nguyen at ONE Championship: Unstoppable Dreams on 18 May 2018. Following a five-round back-and-forth battle, Lee would lose by a narrow split-decision, marking his second defeat to the Vietnamese-Australian featherweight.

Lee dropped another match against Filipino Edward Kelly at ONE Championship: Beyond the Horizon on September 8, 2018, after he was disqualified under the promotion's global martial art ruleset. During his takedown of Kelly, Lee was judged to have used an illegal belly-to-back suplex that caused Kelly to land on his head and neck.

He got back on the win sheet against former Pancrase Lightweight Champion Kazuki Tokudome in a 73 kg catchweight bout at ONE Championship: Heart of the Lion on 9 November 2018, defeating the Japanese fighter in the first-round via TKO. The match was added to the card on short notice after his sister Angela Lee, who was scheduled to face Xiong Jing Nan for the ONE Strawweight Championship, was forced to pull out due to a back injury.

In his anticipated rematch against Edward Kelly at ONE Championship: Eternal Glory on January 19, 2019, Lee stopped Kelly via first-round TKO and pushed his overall record to 14–3.

==== ONE Lightweight Champion ====
Lee agreed to an open challenge for the title from ONE Lightweight World Champion Shinya Aoki, issued in March 2019 just after Aoki had won the lightweight title himself. Lee, a featherweight, would be moving up a division in order to challenge for the belt. On May 17, 2019, at ONE Championship: Enter The Dragon, Lee survived an armbar submission attempt to upset the Japanese grappling legend in the second-round via TKO finish and win his first mixed martial arts world title. His victory also made him the youngest ever male mixed martial arts world champion, as well as the first ever brother-sister pair of world champions in the history of mixed martial arts, with his sister Angela Lee holding the ONE Atomweight Championship.

On September 26, 2019, ONE Championship Chairman and founder Chatri Sityodtong announced that Lee had accepted an offer to serve as a late-notice replacement for the injured Eddie Alvarez in the ONE Lightweight World Grand Prix Final. The match would be against Turkish finalist Saygid Guseyn Arslanaliev at ONE: Century – Part 1 on 13 October 2019, after initial replacement Filipino fighter Eduard Folayang had trouble with visa issues. The late insertion into the event would allow Lee to fight on the same card as his sister Angela Lee, who was defending her atomweight title that night. Lee would go on to win by unanimous decision, earning the ONE Lightweight Word Grand Prix Championship.

In the first title defense, Lee faced Iuri Lapicus at ONE: Inside the Matrix on October 30, 2020. After surviving an initial barrage, he won the fight in the first round by TKO via punches on the ground.

In the second title defense, Lee faced Timofey Nastyukhin at ONE on TNT 2 on April 14, 2021. He won the fight via TKO just over a minute into the first round.

In the third title defense, Lee faced Ok Rae-yoon at ONE: Revolution on September 24, 2021. Lee lost the fight by a unanimous decision. Due to the controversial nature of the decision, it was reviewed by the ONE Competition Committee which ultimately upheld the result.

The rematch between Lee and Ok for the ONE Lightweight World Championship took place on August 26, 2022, at ONE 160. Lee recaptured the title after dropping Yoon in the second round and finishing him on the ground with knees. This win earned him the Performance of the Night award.

==== ONE Welterweight Champion ====
Lee moved up to 185 lbs and debuted at welterweight as he challenged for the ONE Welterweight World Championship against reigning champion Kiamrian Abbasov on November 18, 2022, at ONE on Prime Video 4. At weigh-ins, Abbasov missed weight, coming in at 186.25 lbs, 1.25 pounds over the limit. Abbasov was stripped of the title and the bout proceeded at a catchweight with only Lee being able to win the title. He won the fight via technical knockout in the fourth round. This win earned him the Performance of the Night award, and made Lee the fourth simultaneous two-division champion in ONE history. In November 2026, Lee was stripped of the Welterweight title due to inactivity.

==== Hiatus and return ====
Lee went on hiatus from competition due to the death of his sister, fellow-competitor, Victoria Lee, but has expressed commitment to continue fighting in the future.

After a two-years hiatus, Lee was scheduled to defend the ONE Lightweight World Championship against Alibeg Rasulov on November 9, 2024, at ONE 169. However, it was announced that the bout was moved to ONE Fight Night 26 on December 7 for unknown reasons. During the round two, Lee poked Rasulov in the eye rendering him unable to continue. The fight was declared a no contest.

A rematch between Lee and Rasulov took place on November 16, 2025, at ONE 173. Lee won the fight via technical knockout in the second round.

Lee made his next defense of the ONE Lightweight World Championship against Tye Ruotolo at ONE: The Inner Circle 37 on November 6, 2026. He lost the bout via rear-naked choke submission in the first round.

== Personal life ==
Lee holds American and Canadian citizenship.

Lee and his wife Katie had their first child in April 2021.

Lee's older sister is fellow ONE World Champion Angela Lee, and his younger sister Victoria Lee made her successful professional MMA debut at the age of 16 on February 26, 2021. On January 7, 2023, it was revealed by his sister Angela that Victoria had died on December 26, 2022, at the age of 18. On September 19, 2023, his sister Angela confessed that she had attempted suicide in 2017 and that their youngest sister, Victoria had taken her own life in December 2022. Lee's younger brother Adrian Lee made his MMA debut for One Fighting Championship in 2024.

== Championships and accomplishments ==
=== Pankration ===
- World Pangration Athlima Federation (WPAF) World Championship
  - 2012 Agon Men, Cadets, -60 kg — Gold
- USA Pankration National Championship
  - 2012 Youth, Age 12–13, -153 lb — Silver
- USFL Pankration Championship
  - 2013 Junior, Age 14–17, -140 lb — Gold
- FILA Grappling World Championship
  - 2013 Boys, Age 14–15, -66 kg — Gold

=== Grappling ===
- FILA Grappling World Championship
  - 2013 Brazilian Jiu-Jitsu, Boys, Age 14–15, -66 kg — Gold
- FILA Grappling World Championship
  - 2013 Submission Wrestling, Boys, Age 14–15, -66 kg — Gold

=== Mixed martial arts ===
- ONE Championship
  - ONE Lightweight World Championship (Two times)
    - Three successful title defenses (Overall)
      - Two successful title defenses (First reign)
      - One successful title defense (Second reign)
  - ONE Welterweight World Championship (One time)
  - 2019 ONE Lightweight World Grand Prix Tournament Winner
  - Most wins in ONE history (17)
  - Most finishes in ONE history (16)
  - Most knockouts in ONE history (12)
  - Performance of the Night (Two time) vs. Ok Rae Yoon and Kiamrian Abbasov
  - Fourth double champion in ONE history
- FILA Grappling World Championship
  - 2013 Amateur MMA, Boys, Age 14–15, -66 kg — Gold

== Mixed martial arts record ==
Professional record breakdown
24 matches	18 wins	5 losses
By knockout	13	0
By submission	4	2
By decision	1	2
By disqualification	0	1
No contests	1	

Res.	Record	Opponent	Method	Event	Date	Round	Time	Location	Notes
Loss	18–5 (1)	Tye Ruotolo	Submission (rear-naked choke)	ONE: The Inner Circle 37	November 6, 2026	1	2:08	Bangkok, Thailand	Lost the ONE Lightweight Championship (170 lb).
Win	18–4 (1)	Alibeg Rasulov	TKO (knees)	ONE 173	November 16, 2025	2	2:32	Tokyo, Japan	Defended the ONE Lightweight Championship (170 lb). Performance of the Night.
NC	17–4 (1)	Alibeg Rasulov	NC (accidental eye poke)	ONE Fight Night 26	December 7, 2024	2	4:55	Bangkok, Thailand	Retained the ONE Lightweight Championship (170 lb). Accidental eye poke rendered Rasulov unable to continue.
Win	17–4	Kiamrian Abbasov	TKO (elbows and punches)	ONE on Prime Video 4	November 19, 2022	4	4:20	Kallang, Singapore	Middleweight debut. Won the ONE Welterweight Championship (185 lb). Abbasov missed weight (186.25 lb) and was stripped of the title. Only Lee was eligible to win the title. Performance of the Night. Later stripped of the title on November 18, 2026 due to inactivity.
Win	16–4	Ok Rae-yoon	TKO (knees)	ONE 160	August 26, 2022	2	1:00	Kallang, Singapore	Won the ONE Lightweight Championship (170 lb). Performance of the Night.
Loss	15–4	Ok Rae-yoon	Decision (unanimous)	ONE: Revolution	September 24, 2021	5	5:00	Kallang, Singapore	Lost the ONE Lightweight Championship (170 lb).
Win	15–3	Timofey Nastyukhin	TKO (punches)	ONE on TNT 2	April 14, 2021	1	1:13	Kallang, Singapore	Defended the ONE Lightweight Championship (170 lb).
Win	14–3	Iuri Lapicus	TKO (punches)	ONE: Inside the Matrix	October 30, 2020	1	2:19	Kallang, Singapore	Defended the ONE Lightweight Championship (170 lb).
Win	13–3	Saygid Guseyn Arslanaliev	Decision (unanimous)	ONE: Century – Part 1	October 13, 2019	3	5:00	Tokyo, Japan	Won the ONE Lightweight World Grand Prix.
Win	12–3	Shinya Aoki	TKO (punches)	ONE: Enter The Dragon	May 17, 2019	2	0:51	Kallang, Singapore	Welterweight debut. Won the ONE Lightweight Championship (170 lb).
Win	11–3	Edward Kelly	TKO (punches)	ONE: Eternal Glory	January 19, 2019	1	2:53	Jakarta, Indonesia	
Win	10–3	Kazuki Tokudome	TKO (punches)	ONE: Heart of the Lion	November 9, 2018	1	3:07	Kallang, Singapore	Catchweight (160 lb) bout.
Loss	9–3	Edward Kelly	DQ (illegal suplex)	ONE: Beyond the Horizon	September 8, 2018	1	2:19	Shanghai, China	
Loss	9–2	Martin Nguyen	Decision (split)	ONE: Unstoppable Dreams	May 18, 2018	5	5:00	Kallang, Singapore	Lightweight debut. For the ONE Featherweight Championship (155 lb).
Win	9–1	Kazunori Yokota	Submission (guillotine choke)	ONE: Visions of Victory	March 9, 2018	2	4:34	Kuala Lumpur, Malaysia	
Win	8–1	Kotetsu Boku	KO (slam)	ONE: Warriors of the World	December 9, 2017	1	3:24	Bangkok, Thailand	
Win	7–1	Keanu Subba	Submission (triangle armbar)	ONE: Quest for Greatness	August 18, 2017	3	1:11	Kuala Lumpur, Malaysia	
Win	6–1	Wan Jianping	TKO (elbows and punches)	ONE: Kings of Destiny	April 21, 2017	1	4:50	Pasay, Philippines	
Loss	5–1	Martin Nguyen	Technical Submission (guillotine choke)	ONE: Heroes of the World	August 13, 2016	1	4:30	Macau, SAR, China	
Win	5–0	Rocky Batolbatol	TKO (submission to punches)	ONE: Kingdom of Champions	May 27, 2016	1	2:14	Bangkok, Thailand	
Win	4–0	Cary Bullos	Submission (brabo choke)	ONE: Ascent to Power	May 6, 2016	1	2:07	Kallang, Singapore	
Win	3–0	Anthony Engelen	TKO (punches and elbows)	ONE: Union of Warriors	March 18, 2016	1	4:14	Yangon, Myanmar	Catchweight (161 lb) bout.
Win	2–0	Mahmoud Deab Mohamed	Submission (kimura)	ONE: Clash of Heroes	January 29, 2016	1	2:20	Kuala Lumpur, Malaysia	
Win	1–0	David Meak	KO (punches)	ONE: Spirit of Champions	December 11, 2015	1	0:29	Pasay, Philippines	Featherweight debut.

== See also ==
- List of male mixed martial artists
- List of current ONE fighters
- List of ONE Championship champions
- Double champions in MMA
