= 2016 in ONE Championship =

Mixed martial arts events

Information
- First date: January 14, 2016

Events
- Total events: 14

Fights
- Title fights: 8

Chronology
2015 in ONE	2016 in ONE Championship	2017 in ONE

The year 2016 was the 6th year in the history of the ONE Championship, a mixed martial arts promotion based in Singapore.

== List of events ==
ONE Championship
#	Event title	Date	Arena	Location
1	ONE Championship: Dynasty of Champions (Changsha)	January 23, 2016	Changsha SWC Stadium	Changsha, China
2	ONE Championship: Clash of Heroes	January 29, 2016	Stadium Negara	Kuala Lumpur, Malaysia
3	ONE Championship: Tribe of Warriors	February 20, 2016	Istora Senayan	Jakarta, Indonesia
4	ONE Championship: Union of Warriors	March 18, 2016	Thuwunna National Indoor Stadium	Yangon, Myanmar
5	ONE Championship: Global Warriors	April 15, 2016	Mall of Asia Arena	Pasay, Philippines
6	ONE Championship: Ascent to Power	May 6, 2016	Singapore Indoor Stadium	Kallang, Singapore
7	ONE Championship: Kingdom of Champions	May 27, 2016	Impact Arena	Bangkok, Thailand
8	ONE Championship: Dynasty of Champions (Anhui)	July 2, 2016	Hefei Olympic Sports Center Stadium	Anhui, China
9	ONE Championship: Heroes of the World	August 13, 2016	Cotai Arena, The Venetian Macao	Macau, SAR, China
10	ONE Championship: Titles & Titans	August 27, 2016	Jakarta Convention Center	Jakarta, Indonesia
11	ONE Championship: Unbreakable Warriors	September 2, 2016	Stadium Negara	Kuala Lumpur, Malaysia
12	ONE Championship: State of Warriors	October 7, 2016	Thuwunna National Indoor Stadium	Yangon, Myanmar
13	ONE Championship: Defending Honor	November 11, 2016	Singapore Indoor Stadium	Kallang, Singapore
14	ONE Championship: Age of Domination	December 2, 2016	Mall of Asia Arena	Pasay, Philippines

== Grand Prix bracket ==
=== Changsha Bantamweight Tournament ===
==== ONE Changsha Bantamweight Tournament bracket ====
Semi-finals
(China) Bu Huo You Ga	SUB
(China) Bo Cai Chang	1r.
(China) Ma Hao Bin	SUB
(China) Wu Ting Shen	1r.

Final
(China) Ma Hao Bin	SUB
(China) Bu Huo You Ga	1r.

=== Hefei Flyweight Tournament ===
==== ONE Hefei Flyweight Tournament bracket ====
Semi-finals
(China) Li Haojie	UD
(China) Keremuaili Maimaitatuoheti	3r.
(China) Bu Huo You Ga	SUB
(China) Wan Jianping	2r.

Final
(China) Li Haojie	3r.
(China) Bu Huo You Ga	UD

=== Myanmar Featherweight Tournament ===
==== ONE Myanmar Featherweight Tournament bracket ====
Semi-finals
(Myanmar) Phoe Thaw	TKO
(Myanmar) Kat Pali	1r.
(Myanmar) Saw Yan Paing	UD
(Myanmar) Ye Yint Aung	3r.

Final
(Myanmar) Phoe Thaw	TKO
(Myanmar) Saw Yan Paing	1r.

== ONE Championship: Dynasty of Champions (Changsha) ==
ONE Championship: Dynasty of Champions (Changsha)
- Promotion: ONE Championship
- Date: January 23, 2016
- Venue: Changsha SWC Stadium
- City: Changsha, China

Event chronology
ONE Championship: Spirit of Champions	ONE Championship: Dynasty of Champions (Changsha)	ONE Championship: Clash of Heroes

ONE Championship: Dynasty of Champions (Changsha) (also known as ONE Championship 36) was a mixed martial arts event held by ONE Championship. The event was on January 23, 2016 at the SWC Stadium in Changsha, China.

=== Background ===
ONE Championship returned to Mainland China holding the fourth title defense for ONE Bantamweight Champion Bibiano Fernandes.

=== Results ===
Main card
Weight class				Method	Round	Time	Notes
Bantamweight	(Brazil) Bibiano Fernandes (c)	def.	(Philippines) Kevin Belingon	Submission (kimura)	1	4:04	(Note: For the ONE Bantamweight Championship)
Featherweight	(China) Li Kai Wen	def.	(China) Yang Sen	Decision (unanimous)	3	5:00	(Note: For the Chinese Featherweight Warrior acknowledgement)
Bantamweight	(China) Ma Hao Bin	def.	(China) Bu Huo You Ga	Submission (guillotine choke)	1	1:08	(Note: Changsha Bantamweight Tournament Finale)
Bantamweight	(Tajikistan) Muin Gafurov	def.	(Finland) Toni Tauru	TKO (strikes)	3	1:17
Flyweight	(Japan) Riku Shibuya	def.	(Philippines) Roy Doliguez	Decision (unanimous)	3	5:00
Bantamweight	(Taiwan) Sung Ming Yen	def.	(Indonesia) Sunoto Peringkat	Submission (guillotine choke)	1	0:31
Changsha Bantamweight Tournament
Weight class				Method	Round	Time	Notes
Bantamweight	(China) Ma Hao Bin	def.	(China) Wu Ting Shen	Submission (guillotine choke)	1	0:27	(Note: Changsha Bantamweight Tournament Semi-final)
Bantamweight	(China) Bu Huo You Ga	def.	(China) Bo Cai Chang	Submission (reverse head and arm choke)	1	2:26	(Note: Changsha Bantamweight Tournament Semi-final)
Bantamweight	(China) Tang De Pan	def.	(China) Zhou Biao	KO (slam)	1	0:59	(Note: Changsha Bantamweight Tournament Alternate)

== ONE Championship: Clash of Heroes ==
ONE Championship: Clash of Heroes
- Promotion: ONE Championship
- Date: January 29, 2016
- Venue: Stadium Negara
- City: Kuala Lumpur, Malaysia

Event chronology
ONE Championship: Dynasty of Champions (Changsha)	ONE Championship: Clash of Heroes	ONE Championship: Tribe of Warriors

ONE Championship: Clash of Heroes (also known as ONE Championship 37) was a mixed martial arts event held by ONE Championship. The event was on January 29, 2016 at the Stadium Negara in Kuala Lumpur, Malaysia.

=== Background ===
The duo has been called of Ev Ting and Eric Kelly has been called "Malaysian Warriors".

=== Results ===
Main card
Weight class				Method	Round	Time	Notes
Featherweight	(Malaysia) Ev Ting	def.	(Philippines) Eric Kelly	Submission (guillotine choke)	3	1:58	(Note: For the Malaysia Warrior acknowledgement)
Lightweight	(Philippines) Eduard Folayang	def.	(Japan) Tetsuya Yamada	Decision (unanimous)	3	5:00
Catchweight (210 lb)	(United States) Jake Butler	def.	(Japan) Tatsuya Mizuno	TKO (punches and elbows)	1	4:30
Flyweight	(Philippines) Geje Eustaquio	def.	(Malaysia) Saiful Merican	KO (punch and soccer kicks)	1	1:21
Lightweight	(Belgium) Samir Mrabet	def.	(Egypt) Sami Amin	Submission (Arm-triangle Choke)	2	1:31
Lightweight	(Malaysia) Keanu Subba	def.	(Malaysia) Rayner Kinsiong	TKO (punches)	1	2:01
Featherweight	(Canada) Christian Lee	def.	(Egypt) Mahmoud Mohamed	Submission (Kimura)	1	2:20
Middleweight	(Malaysia) Agilan Thani	def.	(Canada) James Kouame	Submission (rear-naked choke)	2	1:12
Preliminary card (Facebook)
Weight class				Method	Round	Time	Notes
Lightweight	(Russia) Saygid Guseyn Arslanaliev	def.	(Indonesia) Mishal Alfad	TKO (punches)	1	0:32
Women's Catchweight (107 lb)	(Taiwan) Jenny Huang	def.	(Egypt) Amira Badr	Submission (triangle choke)	2	3:09

== ONE Championship: Tribe of Warriors ==
ONE Championship: Tribe of Warriors
- Promotion: ONE Championship
- Date: February 20, 2016
- Venue: Istora Senayan
- City: Jakarta, Indonesia

Event chronology
ONE Championship: Clash of Heroes	ONE Championship: Tribe of Warriors	ONE Championship: Union of Warriors

ONE Championship: Tribe of Warriors (also known as ONE Championship 38) was a mixed martial arts event held by ONE Championship. The event was held on February 20, 2016 at the Istora Senayan in Jakarta, Indonesia.

=== Background ===
ONE Championship returns to Indonesia holding the contest between Luis Santos and Rafael Silva for the #1 contendership for the ONE Welterweight Championship against Ben Askren.

=== Results ===
Main card
Weight class				Method	Round	Time	Notes
Welterweight	(Brazil) Luis Santos	def.	(Portugal) Rafael Silva	TKO (strikes)	1	1:17	(Note: 1. 1 Contendership for the ONE Welterweight Championship)
Catchweight (155 lb)	(South Korea) Kotetsu Boku	def.	(Netherlands) Vincent Latoel	TKO (strikes)	2	4:04	(Note: For the Indonesian Warrior acknowledgement)
Catchweight (130 lb)	(United States) Andrew Leone	def.	(Japan) Koetsu Okazaki	Decision (unanimous)	3	5:00
Heavyweight	(Poland) Marcin Prachnio	def.	(Brazil) Alexandre Machado	TKO (strikes)	1	2:44
Featherweight	(Netherlands) Anthony Engelen	def.	(Philippines) Rocky Batolbatol	Submission (rear-naked choke)	1	2:16
Featherweight	(Indonesia) Yohan Mulia Legowo	def.	(Indonesia) Mario Satya Wirawan	Submission (guillotine choke)	1	1:44
Bantamweight	(China) Li Haojie	def.	(Liberia) Jerome S. Paye	Decision (unanimous)	3	5:00
Preliminary card
Weight class				Method	Round	Time	Notes
Welterweight	(Philippines) Trestle Tan	def.	(Mexico) Djatmiko Waluyo	Submission (rear-naked choke)	1	4:03
Catchweight (160 lb)	(Philippines) Jimmy Yabo	def.	(Pakistan) Bashir Ahmad	KO (punch)	1	0:21
Women's Catchweight (120 lb)	(Canada) Angela Lee	def.	(United States) Rebecca Heintzman	Submission (rear-naked choke)	2	1:08

== ONE Championship: Union of Warriors ==
ONE Championship: Union of Warriors
- Promotion: ONE Championship
- Date: March 18, 2016
- Venue: Thuwanna Indoor Stadium
- City: Yangon, Myanmar

Event chronology
ONE Championship: Clash of Heroes	ONE Championship: Union of Warriors	ONE Championship: Global Rivals

ONE Championship: Union of Warriors (also known as ONE Championship 39) was a mixed martial arts event held by ONE Championship. The event was held on March 18, 2016 at the Thuwanna Indoor Stadium in Yangon, Myanmar.

=== Results ===
Main card
Weight class				Method	Round	Time	Notes
Middleweight	(Myanmar) Aung La Nsang	def.	(Egypt) Mohamed Ali	Submission (guillotine choke)	1	2:38
Flyweight	(Brazil) Adriano Moraes	def.	(Philippines) Eugene Toquero	Submission (D'arce choke)	1	4:53
Bantamweight	(Myanmar) Tha Pyay Nyo	def.	(Myanmar) Khal Syn Phyo	TKO (knee, punches)	3	1:36
Catchweight (160 lb)	(Canada) Christian Lee	def.	(Netherlands) Anthony Engelen	TKO (strikes)	3	1:36
Lightweight	(Myanmar) Kyal Linn Aung	def.	(Myanmar) Thway Thit Aung	Decision (unanimous)	3	5:00
Strawweight	(Brazil) Alex Silva	def.	(Philippines) Robin Catalan	Submission (arm triangle choke)	1	4:25
Featherweight	(Myanmar) Phoe Thaw	def.	(Myanmar) Saw Llay	TKO (punches)	1	2:27
Featherweight	(Philippines) Edward Kelly	def.	(Australia) Jordan Lucas	Submission (rear naked choke)	1	3:47
Bantamweight	(Myanmar) Thar A Thal Ta Pwint	def.	(Myanmar) Aung Kyaw Kyaw	TKO (punches)	1	2:58
Lightweight	(Myanmar) Ye Yint Aung	def.	(Myanmar) Yan Naing Aung	TKO (strikes)	1	3:50

.

== ONE Championship: Global Rivals ==
ONE Championship: Global Rivals
- Promotion: ONE Championship
- Date: April 15, 2016
- Venue: Mall of Asia Arena
- City: Pasay, Philippines

Event chronology
ONE Championship: Union of Warriors	ONE Championship: Global Rivals	ONE Championship: Ascent to Power

ONE Championship: Global Rivals (also known as ONE Championship 40) was a mixed martial arts event held by ONE Championship. The event was held on April 15, 2016 at the Mall of Asia Arena in Pasay, Philippines.

=== Background ===
ONE returned to the Philippines with another stacked card.

=== Results ===
Main card
Weight class				Method	Round	Time	Notes
Catchweight (187 lb)	(United States) Ben Askren	def.	(Russia) Nikolay Aleksakhin	Decision (unanimous)	5	5:00	(Note: ONE Superfight; originally a title defense for Askren, the title stipulation was put off due to Aleksakhin not making weight)
Flyweight	(Philippines) Geje Eustaquio	def.	(Malaysia) Gianni Subba	Decision (unanimous)	3	5:00
Lightweight	(United States) Lowen Tynanes	def.	(Japan) Koji Ando	Decision (unanimous)	3	5:00
Bantamweight	(Australia) Reece Mclaren	def.	(Tajikistan) Muin Gafurov	Decision (unanimous)	3	5:00
Featherweight	(Philippines) Honorio Banario	def.	(Philippines) Vaughn Donayre	Decision (unanimous)	3	5:00
Featherweight	(Australia) Martin Nguyen	def.	(China) Li Kai Wen	TKO (punches)	1	4:44
Catchweight (127 lb)	(Philippines) Joshua Pacio	def.	(Philippines) Rabin Catalan	TKO (punches)	2	3:19
Women's Atomweight	(Philippines) April Osenio	def.	(Philippines) Natalie Gonzalez Hills	Submission (armbar)	1	3:23
Catchweight (147 lb)	(Indonesia) Sunoto Peringkat	def.	(Philippines) Bernard Soriano	TKO (punches)	1	3:50
Flyweight	(Philippines) Danny Kingad	def.	(Malaysia) Muhamad Haidar	TKO (punches)	1	2:20

== ONE Championship: Ascent to Power ==
ONE Championship: Ascent to Power
- Promotion: ONE Championship
- Date: May 6, 2016
- Venue: Singapore Indoor Stadium
- City: Kallang, Singapore

Event chronology
ONE Championship: Global Rivals	ONE Championship: Ascent to Power	ONE Championship: Kingdom of Champions

ONE Championship: Ascent to Power (also known as ONE Championship 41) was a mixed martial arts event held by ONE Championship. The event was held on May 6, 2016 at the Singapore Indoor Stadium in Kallang, Singapore.

=== Background ===
ONE Championship returned to Singapore with a fight night that included two championship contests, for the inaugural Cruiserweight (also known as Light heavyweight) and Women's Atomweight championships.

=== Results ===
Main card
Weight class				Method	Round	Time	Notes
Women's Atomweight	(Canada) Angela Lee	def.	(Japan) Mei Yamaguchi	Decision (unanimous)	5	5:00	(Note: For the inaugural ONE Women's Atomweight Championship)
Cruiserweight	(Brazil) Roger Gracie	def.	(Poland) Michal Pasternak	Technical Submission (arm-triangle choke)	1	2:13	(Note: For the inaugural ONE Cruiserweight Championship)
Featherweight	(Mongolia) Jadamba Narantungalag	def.	(South Korea) Kotetsu Boku	Submission (Von Flue choke)	3	1:27
Lightweight	(Canada) Christian Lee	def.	(Philippines) Cary Bullos	Submission (D'arce choke)	1	2:07
Middleweight	(Japan) Tatsuya Mizuno	def.	(Egypt) Mohamed Ali	TKO (strikes)	2	3:52
Lightweight	(Singapore) Amir Khan	def.	(Taiwan) John Chang	TKO (punches)	1	3:39
Preliminary card
Weight class				Method	Round	Time	Notes
Featherweight	(Singapore) Benedict Ang	def.	(Philippines) Jimmy Yabo	Submission (strikes)	3	3:11
Lightweight	(Russia) Saygid Guseyn Arslanaliev	def.	(China) Ma Jia Wen	TKO (strikes)	1	1:57
Catchweight (194 lb)	(Malaysia) Agilan Thani	def.	(United States) Brad Robinson	TKO (strikes)	1	4:40

== ONE Championship: Kingdom of Champions ==
ONE Championship: Kingdom of Champions
- Promotion: ONE Championship
- Date: May 27, 2016
- Venue: Impact Arena
- City: Bangkok, Thailand

Event chronology
ONE Championship: Ascent to Power	ONE Championship: Kingdom of Champions	ONE Championship: Dynasty of Champions (Anhui)

ONE Championship: Kingdom of Champions (also known as ONE Championship 42) was a mixed martial arts event held by ONE Championship. The event held on May 27, 2016 at the 12,000 capacity Impact Arena in Bangkok, Thailand.

=== Background ===
ONE makes its first visit to Thailand with an outstanding event, including music presentations from Thai top bands Big Ass and Bodyslam.

=== Results ===
Main card
Weight class				Method	Round	Time	Notes
Strawweight	(Japan) Yoshitaka Naito	def.	(Thailand) Dejdamrong Sor Amnuaysirichoke (c)	Submission (rear-naked choke)	4	4:00	(Note: For the ONE Strawweight Championship)
Featherweight	(Russia) Marat Gafurov (c)	def.	(Japan) Kazunori Yokota	Submission (rear-naked choke)	2	4:25	(Note: For the ONE Featherweight Championship)
Featherweight	(Russia) Timofey Nastyukhin	def.	(Australia) Rob Lisita	KO (punch & soccer kick)	1	0:06
Middleweight	(Poland) Marcin Prachnio	def.	(Brazil) Leandro Ataides	Decision (split)	3	5:00
Featherweight	(Thailand) Shannon Wiratchai	def.	(Myanmar) Kyal Linn Aung	Submission (rear-naked choke)	1	2:17
Featherweight	(Canada) Christian Lee	def.	(Philippines) Rocky Batolbatol	Submission (strikes)	1	2:14
Bantamweight	(Thailand) Yodsanan Sityodtong	def.	(Cambodia) Khon Sichan	TKO (punches)	1	3:44
Strawweight	(Thailand) Pongsiri Mitsatit	def.	(Myanmar) Ye Thway Ne	TKO (knees)	1	2:24
Featherweight	(Thailand) Kritsada Kongsrichai	def.	(Cambodia) Kev Hemmorlor	TKO (punches)	1	1:58

== ONE Championship: Dynasty of Champions (Anhui) ==
ONE Championship: Dynasty of Champions (Anhui)
- Promotion: ONE Championship
- Date: July 2, 2016
- Venue: Hefei Olympic Sports Centre
- City: Anhui, China

Event chronology
ONE Championship: Kingdom of Champions	ONE Championship: Dynasty of Champions (Anhui)	ONE Championship: Heroes of the World

ONE Championship: Dynasty of Champions (Anhui) (also known as ONE Championship 43) was a mixed martial arts event held by ONE Championship. The event was held on July 2, 2016 at the Hefei Olympic Sports Centre in Anhui, China.

=== Results ===
Main card
Weight class				Method	Round	Time	Notes
Flyweight	(China) Bu Huo You Ga	def.	(China) Li Haojie	Decision (unanimous)	3	5:00	(Note: Hefei Flyweight Tournament Final)
Featherweight	(Mongolia) Jadamba Narantungalag	def.	(Philippines) Eric Kelly	KO (punch)	1	0:44
Featherweight	(China) Li Kai Wen	def.	(Malaysia) Keanu Subba	Decision (unanimous)	3	5:00
Middleweight	(Myanmar) Aung La Nsang	def.	(Russia) Alexey Butorin	Submission (arm triangle choke)	2	1:57
Flyweight	(China) Wu Ze	def.	(China) Zheng Ziaoliang	TKO (punches)	1	4:49
Lightweight	(Costa Rica) Ariel Sexton	def.	(United States) Roger Huerta	Submission (strikes)	3	3:53
Women's Flyweight	(Malaysia) Ann Osman	def.	(Egypt) Haiat Farag Yousseef	Submission (armbar)	1	3:59
Hefei Flyweight Tournament
Weight class				Method	Round	Time	Notes
Flyweight	(China) Tang Ren Xing	def.	(China) Zhang You Liang	Submission (guillotine choke)	2	4:42	(Note: Hefei Flyweight Tournament Alternate)
Flyweight	(China) Bu Huo You Ga	def.	(China) Wan Jianping	Submission (guillotine choke)	2	1:24	(Note: Hefei Flyweight Tournament Semifinal)
Flyweight	(China) Li Haojie	def.	(China) Keremuaili Maimaitatuoheti	Decision (unanimous)	2	5:00	(Note: Hefei Flyweight Tournament Semifinal)

== ONE Championship: Heroes of the World ==
ONE Championship: Heroes of the World
- Promotion: ONE Championship
- Date: August 13, 2016
- Venue: Cotai Arena
- City: Cotai, Macau, China

Event chronology
ONE Championship: Dynasty of Champions (Anhui)	ONE Championship: Heroes of the World	ONE Championship: Titles and Titans

ONE Championship: Heroes of the World (also known as ONE Championship 44) was a mixed martial arts event held by ONE Championship. The event was held on August 13, 2016 at the Cotai Arena in Cotai, Macau, China.

=== Results ===
Main card
Weight class				Method	Round	Time	Notes
Flyweight	(Brazil) Adriano Moraes	def.	(Kyrgyzstan) Tilek Batyrov	Submission (rear-naked choke)	2	4:49	(Note: For the interim ONE Flyweight Championship)
Lightweight	(Philippines) Eduard Folayang	def.	(Australia) Adrian Pang	Decision (unanimous)	3	5:00
Lightweight	(Philippines) Honorio Banario	def.	(Hong Kong) Eddie Ng	Decision (unanimous)	3	5:00
Featherweight	(Australia) Martin Nguyen	def.	(Canada) Christian Lee	Submission (guillotine choke)	1	4:30
Heavyweight	(Brazil) Alexander Machado	def.	(Hong Kong) Alain Ngalani	Submission (strikes)	2	0:21
Women's Atomweight	(Brazil) Istela Nunes	def.	(Japan) Mei Yamaguchi	Decision (split)	3	5:00
Featherweight	(China) Ma Jia Wen	def.	(Philippines) Jimmy Yabo	TKO (strikes)	3	2:31
Bantamweight	(China) Ma Hao Bin	def.	(Cambodia) Chan Rothana	Decision (unanimous)	3	5:00
Strawweight	(Philippines) Joshua Pacio	def.	(Thailand) Kritsada Kongsrichai	Submission (rear-naked choke)	1	4:37

== ONE Championship: Titles and Titans ==
ONE Championship: Titles and Titans
- Promotion: ONE Championship
- Date: August 27, 2016
- Venue: Jakarta Convention Center
- City: Jakarta, Indonesia

Event chronology
ONE Championship: Heroes of the World	ONE Championship: Titles and Titans	ONE Championship: Unbreakable Warriors

ONE Championship: Titles and Titans (also known as ONE Championship 45) was a mixed martial arts event held by ONE Championship. The event was held on August 27, 2016 at the Jakarta Convention Center in Jakarta, Indonesia.

=== Results ===
Main card
Weight class				Method	Round	Time	Notes
Middleweight	(Brazil) Luis Santos	def.	(Kazakhstan) Igor Svirid	Decision (unanimous)	3	5:00
Featherweight	(Philippines) Edward Kelly	def.	(Netherlands) Vincent Latoel	KO (strikes)	2	0:57
Cruiserweight	(Poland) Marcin Prachnio	def.	(United States) Jake Butler	TKO (strikes)	1	2:30
Lightweight	(Russia) Saygid Guseyn Arslanaliev	def.	(China) Haolan Jietebusibai	Submission (guillotine choke)	1	0:26
Featherweight	(Netherlands) Anthony Engelen	def.	(Egypt) Sami Amin	Submission (rear-naked choke)	2	0:52
Bantamweight	(United States) Casey Suire	def.	(China) Xie Bin	Decision (split)	3	5:00
Featherweight	(Indonesia) Sunoto Peringkat	def.	(Indonesia) Yohan Mulia Legowo	Submission (rear-naked choke)	1	4:14
Bantamweight	(Philippines) Bernard Soriano	def.	(Indonesia) Mario Satya Wirawan	KO (strikes)	1	0:15
Welterweight	(Mexico) Djatmiko Waluyo	def.	(Egypt) Islam Sayed	Submission (heel hook)	1

.

== ONE Championship: Unbreakable Warriors ==
ONE Championship: Unbreakable Warriors
- Promotion: ONE Championship
- Date: September 2, 2016
- Venue: Stadium Negara
- City: Kuala Lumpur, Malaysia

Event chronology
ONE Championship: Titles and Titans	ONE Championship: Unbreakable Warriors	ONE Championship: State of Warriors

ONE Championship: Unbreakable Warriors (also known as ONE Championship 46) was a mixed martial arts event held by ONE Championship. The event was held on September 2, 2016 at the Stadium Negara in Kuala Lumpur, Malaysia.

=== Results ===
Main card
Weight class				Method	Round	Time	Notes
Featherweight	(Malaysia) Ev Ting	def.	(Australia) Rob Lisita	Decision (unanimous)	3	5:00
Featherweight	(Thailand) Shannon Wiratchai	def.	(Malaysia) Peter Davis	TKO (punches)	2	3:32
Women's Flyweight	(Philippines) April Osenio	def.	(Malaysia) Ann Osman	Submission (guillotine choke)	1	4:09
Middleweight	(Brazil) Gilberto Galvão	def.	(Japan) Tatsuya Mizuno	Decision (unanimous)	3	5:00
Flyweight	(Malaysia) Gianni Subba	def.	(Brazil) Yago Bryan	Decision (unanimous)	3	5:00
Welterweight	(Malaysia) Agilan Thani	def.	(Philippines) Trestle Tan	Submission (rear naked choke)	1	2:24
Featherweight	(Malaysia) Keanu Subba	def.	(Pakistan) Waqar Umar	Submission (strikes)	1	4:31
Featherweight	(China) Bahetihan Nuerdiebieke	def.	(Brazil) Bruno Pucci	KO (punch)	1	0:08
Women's Atomweight	(Taiwan) Jenny Huang	def.	(India) Jeet Toshi	Submission (arm triangle choke)	1	3:21
Featherweight	(Malaysia) Muhammad Aiman	def.	(Malaysia) Hisyam Samsudin	Decision (unanimous)	3	5:00
Flyweight	(Philippines) Rene Catalan	def.	(China) Zhang You Liang	Decision (unanimous)	3	5:00

.

== ONE Championship: State of Warriors ==
ONE Championship: State of Warriors
- Promotion: ONE Championship
- Date: October 7, 2016
- Venue: Thuwunna National Indoor Stadium
- City: Yangon, Myanmar

Event chronology
ONE Championship: Unbreakable Warriors	ONE Championship: State of Warriors	ONE Championship: Defending Honor

ONE Championship: State of Warriors (also known as ONE Championship 47) was a mixed martial arts event held by ONE Championship. The event was held on October 7, 2016 at the Thuwunna National Indoor Stadium in Yangon, Myanmar.

=== Results ===
Main card
Weight class				Method	Round	Time	Notes
Strawweight	(Japan) Yoshitaka Naito	def.	(Philippines) Joshua Pacio	Submission (rear-naked choke)	3	1:33
Middleweight	(Myanmar) Aung La Nsang	def.	(Poland) Michal Pasternak	Decision (unanimous)	3	5:00
Featherweight	(Myanmar) Phoe Thaw	def.	(Myanmar) Saw Yan Paing	TKO (punches)	1	3:23	(Note: Myanmar Featherweight Tournament Final)
Bantamweight	(Philippines) Kevin Belingon	def.	(Tajikistan) Muin Gafurov	Decision (unanimous)	3	5:00
Bantamweight	(Russia) Yusup Saadulaev	def.	(Australia) Jordan Lucas	Submission (rear-naked choke)	1	4:27
Featherweight	(Pakistan) Bashir Ahmad	def.	(Egypt) Mahmoud Mohamed	Submission (heel hook)	1	1:23
Myanmar Featherweight Tournament
Weight class				Method	Round	Time	Notes
Featherweight	(Myanmar) Saw Yan Paing	def.	(Myanmar) Ye Yint Aung	Decision (unanimous)	2	5:00	(Note: Myanmar Featherweight Tournament Semi Final)
Featherweight	(Myanmar) Phoe Thaw	def.	(Myanmar) Kat Pali	TKO (punches and elbows)	1	0:22	(Note: Myanmar Featherweight Tournament Semi Final)
Featherweight	(Myanmar) Saw Ba Oo	def.	(Myanmar) Kyal Sin Phyo	Decision (unanimous)	2	5:00	(Note: Myanmar Featherweight Tournament Alternate)

.

== ONE Championship: Defending Honor ==
ONE Championship: Defending Honor
- Promotion: ONE Championship
- Date: November 11, 2016
- Venue: Singapore Indoor Stadium
- City: Kallang, Singapore

Event chronology
ONE Championship: State of Warriors	ONE Championship: Defending Honor	ONE Championship: Age of Domination

ONE Championship: Defending Honor (also known as ONE Championship 48) was a mixed martial arts event held by ONE Championship. The event was held on November 11, 2016 at the Singapore Indoor Stadium in Kallang, Singapore.

=== Results ===
Main card
Weight class				Method	Round	Time	Notes
Lightweight	(Philippines) Eduard Folayang	def.	(Japan) Shinya Aoki (c)	TKO (knees and punches)	3	0:41	(Note: For the ONE Lightweight Championship)
Featherweight	(Russia) Marat Gafurov (c)	def.	(Mongolia) Jadamba Narantungalag	Submission (rear-naked choke)	1	4:51	(Note: For the ONE Featherweight Championship)
Lightweight	(Singapore) Amir Khan	def.	(Philippines) Vaughn Donayre	Submission (rear-naked choke)	3	2:22
Women's Strawweight	(Brazil) Michelle Nicolini	def.	(Egypt) Mona Samir	Submission (modified rear-naked choke)	1	2:16
Lightweight	(United States) Roger Huerta	def.	(Australia) Adrian Pang	Decision (split)	3	5:00
Featherweight	(South Korea) Kotetsu Boku	def.	(Russia) Timofey Nastyukhin	TKO (injury)	1	5:00
Women's Flyweight	(Singapore) Tiffany Teo	def.	(Egypt) Walaa Abbas Mohamed Kamaly	Submission (rear-naked choke)	2	4:15
Preliminary card
Weight class				Method	Round	Time	Notes
Featherweight	(Pakistan) Ahmed Mujtaba	def.	(Singapore) Benedict Ang	Decision (unanimous	3	5:00
Flyweight	(Singapore) Nico Soe	def.	(Malaysia) Muhamad Haidar	Submission (armbar)	1	1:17

.

== ONE Championship: Age of Domination ==
ONE Championship: Age of Domination
- Promotion: ONE Championship
- Date: December 2, 2016
- Venue: Mall of Asia Arena
- City: Pasay, Philippines

Event chronology
ONE Championship: Defending Honor	ONE Championship: Age of Domination	ONE Championship: Quest for Power

ONE Championship: Age of Domination (also known as ONE Championship 49) was a mixed martial arts event held by ONE Championship. The event was held on December 2, 2016 at the Mall of Asia Arena in Pasay, Philippines.

=== Results ===
Main card
Weight class				Method	Round	Time	Notes
Bantamweight	(Brazil) Bibiano Fernandes (c)	def.	(Australia) Reece McLaren	Decision (split)	5	5:00	(Note: For the ONE Bantamweight Championship)
Heavyweight	(United States) Brandon Vera (c)	def.	(Japan) Hideki Sekine	TKO (punches)	1	3:11	(Note: For the ONE Heavyweight Championship)
Bantamweight	(Philippines) Mark Striegl	def.	(Bulgaria) Sotir Kichukov	Decision (unanimous)	3	5:00
Strawweight	(Finland) Toni Tauru	def.	(Philippines) Geje Eustaquio	Submission (rear naked choke)	1	3:55
Featherweight	(Philippines) Honorio Banario	def.	(India) Rajinder Singh Meena	Submission (armbar)	1	4:04
Middleweight	(Brazil) Leandro Ataides	def.	(Egypt) Mohamed Ali	KO (flying knee)	2	4:54
Bantamweight	(Philippines) Edward Kelly	def.	(Indonesia) Sunoto Peringkat	TKO (punches)	3	2:14
Women's Atomweight	(Taiwan) Jenny Huang	def.	(Philippines) April Osenio	Submission (gogoplata)	2	4:28
Strawweight	(Philippines) Danny Kingad	def.	(Philippines) Eugene Toquero	Submission (armbar)	1	4:36
Strawweight	(Cambodia) Sim Bunsrun	def.	(China) Liu Pengshuai	Decision (unanimous)	3	5:00
Flyweight	(China) Xie Bin	def.	(Indonesia) Mario Satya Wirawan	Decision (unanimous)	3	5:00

== See also ==
- 2016 in UFC
- Bellator MMA in 2016
- 2016 in Rizin Fighting Federation
- 2016 in Absolute Championship Berkut
- 2016 in Konfrontacja Sztuk Walki
- 2016 in Road FC
- 2016 in Kunlun Fight
