= Bashir Ahmad (mixed martial artist) =

Pakistani-American mixed martial artist

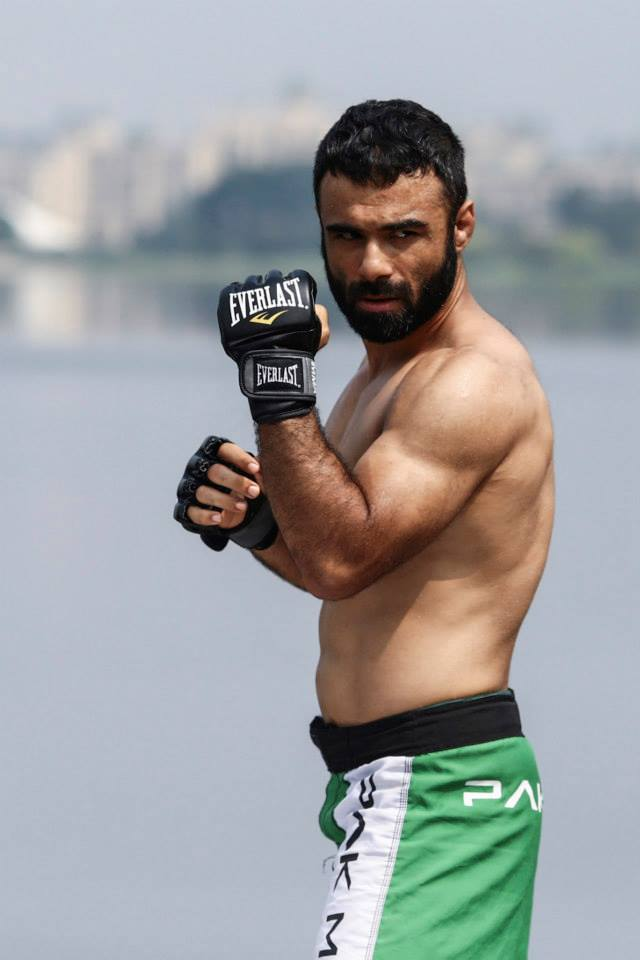
- Bashir Ahmad in 2015
- Born: October 12, 1982 (age 44); Faisalabad, Punjab, Pakistan
- Other names: Somchai
- Nationality: Pakistani; American
- Height: 5 ft 7 in (170 cm)
- Weight: 145 lb (66 kg; 10.4 st)
- Division: Featherweight
- Style: Muay Thai, Brazilian Jiu-Jitsu
- Fighting out of: Lahore, Pakistan
- Team: Synergy MMA; Mixed Martial Arts Pakistan

Mixed martial arts record
- Total: 7
- Wins: 4
- By submission: 3
- By decision: 1
- Losses: 3
- By knockout: 2
- By submission: 1

Other information
- Mixed martial arts record from Sherdog

Bashir Ahmad (Urdu: بشیر احمد), (born October 12, 1982) is a Pakistani-American professional mixed martial artist who is known as the "Godfather of Mixed Martial Arts in Pakistan". He is famous for being the pioneer of mixed martial arts in Pakistan. He is currently signed with ONE Championship.

== Background ==
Bashir Ahmad was born in the city of Faisalabad in Punjab, Pakistan, but moved to Great Falls, Virginia, United States, with his parents when he was three years old. In 2002, he pursued a career in the U.S. military, joining the Virginia National Guard. In 2004, he was deployed to Iraq when the war broke out. He was stationed in Mosul, working as a U.S. Army medic in a team that disarmed explosives. Ahmad started training in Brazilian jiu-jitsu around 2005, when the boom of MMA was taking place in North America.

He came to Lahore, Pakistan in 2007 with the aim of promoting MMA in his native country. After training local kids jiu jitsu for some time, he went to Thailand for a year to train in Muay Thai. On his return to Pakistan in 2009, he set up a small MMA training gym in his own apartment. He nicknamed his apartment “The Slaughterhouse”.

In 2012, Ahmad opened a proper gym named "Synergy MMA Academy" in Lahore which has grown to become one of the biggest gyms in the country.

== Mixed martial arts career ==
=== PAK MMA ===
Bashir Ahmad laid the foundations of Mixed Martial Arts Pakistan with his arrival in Pakistan in 2007. The purpose of Mixed Martial Arts Pakistan was to promote all martial arts and combat sports in the country while mainly focusing on MMA. Working on his purpose, he went around the whole country organizing seminars mostly for BJJ and MMA and helped in conducting the very first MMA fighting events.

=== ONE Championship ===
Bashir Ahmad was the first Pakistani to compete in MMA at an international level when he made his debut in ONE Championship by fighting Shannon Wiratchai at ONE FC: Kings and Champions on April 5, 2013. Ahmad got a cut in the first round but doctors let the fight continue and Ahmad won his promotional debut via unanimous decision.

At ONE FC: Champions and Warriors, he lost to Brazilian jiu-jitsu black belt Bruno Pucci by submission via rear-naked choke.

He fought Tanaphong Khunhankaew at ONE FC: Roar of the Tigers and won by submitting him with a rear-naked choke.

In ONE Championship: Valor of Champions, Bashir Ahmad stepped in to fight Amir Khan Ansari on a 3-day notice when Shannon Wiratchai, Khan's original opponent, was injured. Bashir Ahmad lost that fight by TKO via doctor's stoppage.

Bashir Ahmad was scheduled to fight Martin Nguyen at ONE Championship: Odyssey of Champions but the fight was cancelled when Jadamba Narantungalag couldn't appear to fight for the main title match and Martin Nguyen took his place.

Bashir Ahmad submitted his Egyptian opponent Mahmoud Mohamed in 83 seconds at ONE Championship: State of Warriors.

Bashir Ahmad previously worked as an executive in competition and matchmaking for ONE Championship.

== Shaheen Academy ==
Bashir Ahmad is an active advocate for using martial arts philosophy as a means for the betterment of at-risk youth. In 2015, he founded Shaheen Academy, a non-profit MMA gym and tutoring centre in Lahore, Pakistan. Shaheen is located in the middle of a large slum, Charrar Pind, and its aim is to use martial arts as a vehicle for building confidence, discipline, and self-improvement in the youth of the slum. It provides free martial arts training and after-school tutoring for children. Bashir Ahmad holds an annual fundraiser for Shaheen and the academy runs entirely on donations.

== Mixed martial arts record ==
Professional record breakdown
7 matches	4 wins	3 losses
By knockout	0	2
By submission	3	1
By decision	1	0

Res.	Record	Opponent	Method	Event	Date	Round	Time	Location	Notes
Win	4–3	Mahmoud Mohamed	Submission (heel hook)	ONE: State of Warriors	October 7, 2016	1	1:23	Yangon, Myanmar	
Loss	3–3	Jimmy Yabo	KO (punch)	ONE: Tribe of Warriors	February 20, 2016	1	0:21	Jakarta, Indonesia	Catchweight (158 lb) bout.
Loss	3–2	Amir Khan	TKO (doctor stoppage)	ONE: Valor of Champions	April 24, 2015	3	3:20	Pasay, Philippines	Catchweight (150 lb) bout.
Win	3–1	Tanaphong Khunhankaew	Submission (rear-naked choke)	ONE FC: Roar of Tigers	October 17, 2014	1	4:38	Kuala Lumpur, Malaysia	
Loss	2–1	Bruno Pucci	Submission (rear-naked choke)	ONE FC: Champions & Warriors	September 13, 2013	1	3:13	Jakarta, Indonesia	
Win	2–0	Shannon Wiratchai	Decision (unanimous)	ONE FC: Kings and Champions	April 5, 2013	3	5:00	Kallang, Singapore	Featherweight debut.
Win	1–0	Mohammad Arshad	Submission (rear-naked choke)	Pak Fight Club 2	April 14, 2012	1	0:26	Lahore, Pakistan	Lightweight debut.
