= Timofey Nastyukhin =

Russian mixed martial arts fighter

- Born: Timofey Nastyukhin; November 24, 1989 (age 36); Kazakh SSR, Soviet Union (now Kazakhstan)
- Nationality: Russian
- Height: 5 ft 9 in (1.75 m)
- Weight: 170 lb (77 kg)
- Division: Lightweight (170 lbs); Featherweight (145 lbs)
- Style: Pankration
- Stance: Orthodox
- Fighting out of: Novokuznetsk, Russia
- Team: Raty; Tiger Muay Thai (2014–present)
- Years active: 2010–present

Mixed martial arts record
- Total: 23
- Wins: 14
- By knockout: 7
- By submission: 4
- By decision: 3
- Losses: 9
- By knockout: 6
- By submission: 2
- By decision: 1

Other information
- Mixed martial arts record from Sherdog

Timofey Nastyukhin (Russian: Тимофей Настюхин; born on November 24, 1989), is a Russian mixed martial artist. He is a former FILA Pankration world champion. He made his MMA debut in 2010 and currently competes in ONE Championship.

== Background ==
Nastyukhin was born in the Soviet Kazakhstan, but after the fall of the Soviet Union, his family moved to Siberia. He was bullied for his Kazakh heritage and took up martial arts as a way to combat bullying he received. Nastyukhin found success in Pankration where he became a four-time national champion and a two-time European champion.

Nastyukhin's success in Pankration made the transition to mixed martial arts seamless.

== Mixed martial arts career ==
Nastyukhin made his MMA debut on April 26, 2010, at Siberian League: Siberia vs. Ural. He lost via rear-naked choke to Magomed Guseinov. Nastyukhin was only 18-years-old at the time of his debut, and after the loss he took nearly three years away from active competition to improve his skill set.

On April 8, 2013, Nastyukhin returned to action and began a seven-fight win streak that would lead to his signing to ONE Championship against Dmitry Ermolaev at Siberian League: Siberia vs. Kazakhstan. He won via triangle choke in the first round.

=== ONE Championship ===
On December 5, 2014, Nastyukhin debuted in ONE Championship against Eduard Folayang. He made an instant impact with a first-round knockout by way of a flying knee and soccer kicks in the first round.

At ONE: Defending Honor on November 11, 2016, Nastyukhin squared off against Kotetsu Boku. During the first round, Nastyukhin broke his leg. Although he was able to finish the round, a ringside physician called a stop to the bout. Nastyukhin would not return until August 2017.

In the opening round of the ONE Championship Lightweight World Grand Prix on March 31, 2019, Nastyukhin was matched up with the debuting Eddie Alvarez. Alvarez, a former Bellator and UFC lightweight world champion, was seeking another major championship. Nastyukhin stunned the world with a first-round TKO over Alvarez. However, due to injury, Nastyukhin would not be able to advance to the next round and compete in the semi-finals.

On November 6, 2020, Nastyukhin returned to action and faced #3-ranked lightweight Pieter Buist at ONE Championship: Inside the Matrix 2 in a ONE lightweight title eliminator. He won the fight by unanimous decision and secured a title shot against ONE Lightweight World Champion Christian Lee.

Nastyukhin's title shot materialized against Christian Lee at ONE on TNT 2 on April 14, 2021. He lost the fight via TKO in the first round.

Nastyukhin faced Saygid Guseyn Arslanaliev in a rematch at ONE: Winter Warriors on December 3, 2021. He lost the bout via TKO in the third round. The contest with Arslanaliev was later named 2021 Fight of the Year by ONE Championship.

Nastyukhin faced Halil Amir at ONE on Prime Video 2 on September 30, 2022. He lost the bout via TKO stoppage at the beginning of the second round.

Nastyukhin faced Zhang Lipeng on October 6, 2023, at ONE Fight Night 15. He lost the fight via technical knockout in the first round.

Nastyukhin was scheduled to face Aaron Cañarte on January 11, 2025, at ONE Fight Night 27. However, Nastyukhin pulled out for unknown reasons and was replaced by Enkh-Orgil Baatarkhuu.

== Championships and accomplishments ==
- ONE Championship
  - MMA Fight of the Year 2021 vs. Dagi Arslanaliev
  - Performance of the Night (One time)
  - Fastest knockout in ONE Championship (0:06) vs. Rob Lisita

== Mixed martial arts record ==
Professional record breakdown
23 matches	14 wins	9 losses
By knockout	7	6
By submission	4	2
By decision	3	1

Res.	Record	Opponent	Method	Event	Date	Round	Time	Location	Notes
Loss	14–9	Tumer Ondar	Decision (unanimous)	BetCity Fight Nights 135	March 28, 2026	3	5:00	Elista, Russia	Return to Lightweight.
Loss	14–8	Zhang Lipeng	TKO (punches)	ONE Fight Night 15	October 7, 2023	1	3:18	Bangkok, Thailand	
Loss	14–7	Halil Amir	TKO (punches)	ONE on Prime Video 2	October 1, 2022	2	0:58	Kallang, Singapore	
Loss	14–6	Saygid Guseyn Arslanaliev	TKO (punches)	ONE: Winter Warriors	December 3, 2021	3	0:49	Kallang, Singapore	
Loss	14–5	Christian Lee	TKO (punches)	ONE on TNT 2	April 14, 2021	1	1:13	Kallang, Singapore	For the ONE Lightweight Championship (170 lb).
Win	14–4	Pieter Buist	Decision (unanimous)	ONE: Inside the Matrix 2	November 6, 2020	3	5:00	Kallang, Singapore	
Win	13–4	Eddie Alvarez	TKO (punches)	ONE: A New Era	March 31, 2019	1	4:05	Tokyo, Japan	ONE Lightweight World Grand Prix Quarterfinal.
Loss	12–4	Saygid Guseyn Arslanaliev	KO (punches)	ONE: Conquest of Heroes	September 22, 2018	1	1:57	Jakarta, Indonesia	
Win	12–3	Amir Khan	Decision (unanimous)	ONE: Quest for Gold	February 23, 2018	3	5:00	Yangon, Myanmar	Welterweight debut.
Win	11–3	Koji Ando	Decision (unanimous)	ONE: Kings & Conquerors	August 5, 2017	3	5:00	Macau, SAR, China	
Loss	10–3	Kotetsu Boku	TKO (doctor stoppage)	ONE: Defending Honor	November 11, 2016	1	5:00	Kallang, Singapore	
Win	10–2	Rob Lisita	KO (punch and soccer kick)	ONE: Kingdom of Champions	May 27, 2016	1	0:06	Bangkok, Thailand	
Loss	9–2	Herbert Burns	Submission (rear-naked choke)	ONE: Odyssey of Champions	September 27, 2015	1	3:26	Jakarta, Indonesia	
Win	9–1	Yusuke Kawanago	TKO (soccer kicks)	ONE: Dynasty of Champions 2	June 20, 2015	1	1:32	Guangzhou, China	Featherweight debut.
Win	8–1	Eduard Folayang	KO (flying knee and soccer kicks)	ONE: Warrior's Way	December 5, 2014	1	3:11	Pasay, Philippines	
Win	7–1	Said-Khamzat Avkhadov	KO (punch)	ACB 9	June 22, 2014	1	0:54	Grozny, Russia	
Win	6–1	Mairbek Makhanov	KO (punch)	Siberian League: Combat Kuzbass 2	May 12, 2014	1	0:20	Novokuznetsk, Russia	
Win	5–1	Nikolay Romanschikov	Submission (triangle choke)	Altay Republik MMA League: Throwdown	May 1, 2014	1	0:46	Gorno-Altaysk, Russia	
Win	4–1	Shamil Rafikov	Submission (triangle choke)	Siberian League: Siberian Challenge 2	February 23, 2014	1	3:52	Barnaul, Russia	
Win	3–1	Levon Oganyan	TKO (punches)	Russian MMA Union: 2013 Russian MMA Super Cup	December 22, 2013	1	3:10	Kemerovo, Russia	
Win	2–1	Alexander Vasiliev	Submission (rear-naked choke)	White Rex: Warrior Spirit	October 20, 2013	1	0:33	Novosibirsk, Russia	
Win	1–1	Dmitry Yermolaev	Submission (triangle choke)	Siberian League: Siberia vs. Kazakhstan	April 8, 2013	1	1:30	Novokuznetsk, Russia	
Loss	0–1	Magomedsaigi Guseinov	Submission (rear-naked choke)	Siberian League: Siberia vs. Ural	April 26, 2010	1	5:46	Novokuznetsk, Russia	Lightweight debut.

== See also ==
- List of current ONE fighters
