= ONE: Winter Warriors =

Combat sport events in 2021

- The poster for ONE: Winter Warriors
- Promotion: ONE Championship
- Date: December 3, 2021
- Venue: Singapore Indoor Stadium
- City: Kallang, Singapore

Event chronology
| ONE: NextGen 3 | ONE: Winter Warriors | ONE: Winter Warriors II |

ONE: Winter Warriors (also known as ONE 148: Eersel vs. Murtazaev) was a Combat sport event produced by ONE Championship that took place on December 3, 2021, at the Singapore Indoor Stadium in Kallang, Singapore.

== Background ==
This event featured a kickboxing title fights. In the headline attraction, the reigning ONE Kickboxing Lightweight Champion Regian Eersel will defend his title for the fourth time against Islam Murtazaev.

The co-main event featured the atomweight women's grand prix final between Stamp Fairtex and Ritu Phogat.

== Results ==
Main Card (YouTube / ONE Super App)
| Weight class | | | | Method | Round | Time | Notes |
|---|---|---|---|---|---|---|---|
| Lightweight Kickboxing | Regian Eersel (c) | def. | Islam Murtazaev | Decision (split) | 5 | 3:00 | (Note: For the ONE Lightweight Kickboxing World Championship) |
| Women's Atomweight | Stamp Fairtex | def. | Ritu Phogat | Submission (armbar) | 2 | 2:14 | (Note: ONE Women's Atomweight World Grand Prix Tournament Final) |
| Bantamweight Kickboxing | Hiroki Akimoto | def. | Qiu Jianliang | Decision (unanimous) | 3 | 3:00 |
| Lightweight | Dagi Arslanaliev | def. | Timofey Nastyukhin | TKO (punches) | 3 | 0:49 |
| Heavyweight | Marcus Almeida | def. | Kang Ji Won | Submission (rear-naked choke) | 1 | 2:27 |
| Flyweight | Yuya Wakamatsu | def. | Hu Yong | Decision (unanimous) | 3 | 5:00 |

== Bonus awards ==
The following fighters were awarded bonuses:

- MMA Fight of the Year 2021: Dagi Arslanaliev vs. Timofey Nastyukhin
- $50,000 Performance of the Night: Dagi Arslanaliev, Timofey Nastyukhin

== See also ==
- 2021 in ONE Championship
- List of ONE Championship events
- List of current ONE fighters
