= Victoria Lee =

American mixed martial artist (2004–2022)

- Born: Victoria Sun-hei Lee; May 17, 2004; Wahiawa, Hawaii, U.S.
- Died: December 26, 2022 (aged 18); Hawaii, U.S.
- Nickname: The Prodigy
- Height: 5 ft 5 in (165 cm)
- Weight: 115 lb (52 kg; 8 st 3 lb)
- Division: Strawweight; Atomweight
- Fighting out of: Katong, Singapore
- Team: United MMA; Evolve MMA
- Teachers: Ken Lee (Wrestling); Bruno Pucci (BJJ)
- Rank: Purple belt in BJJ
- Years active: 2019–2022

Mixed martial arts record
- Total: 3
- Wins: 3
- By knockout: 1
- By submission: 2
- Losses: 0

Other information
- Notable relatives: Angela Lee (sister); Christian Lee (brother)
- Mixed martial arts record from Sherdog
- Last updated on: August 2, 2021

Victoria Sun Hei Lee (May 17, 2004 – December 26, 2022) was an American mixed martial artist who competed in ONE Championship.

== Early life ==
Victoria Sun Hei Lee was born in Wahiawa, Hawaii, on May 17, 2004, the daughter of Korean-Canadian mother Jewelz Lee and Chinese-Singaporean father Ken Lee. She was the younger sister of fellow MMA fighters Angela Lee and Christian Lee.

== Career ==
Lee was a two-time Hawaiian Pankration Junior World Champion, Hawaii State Wrestling Champion, and IMMAF Junior World Champion. She trained at United MMA Gym in Hawaii under her brother-in-law Bruno Pucci and was supported by Evolve MMA.

On September 30, 2020, at the age of 16, Lee signed a contract to fight in the Atomweight division of the ONE Championship, becoming its youngest fighter. On February 26, 2021, she made her first fight in the ONE Championship 129: Fists Of Fury event, where she defeated Sunisa Srisan in the second round via rear naked choke.

On July 30, 2021, she made her second fight against Wang Luping in the ONE Championship 139: Battleground event, which she won by submission with a triangle armbar in the first round.

Lee faced Victoria Souza at ONE Championship 143: Revolution on September 24, 2021. She won the bout in the second round via ground and pound.

In 2022, Lee paused her MMA career to focus on graduating from high school. She was slated to return with a bout against Zeba Bano at ONE Fight Night 6 in Bangkok on January 14, 2023.

== Death ==
Lee died in Hawaii on December 26, 2022, at the age of 18, but her death was not revealed until her older sister Angela announced it via Instagram on January 7, 2023. Although a cause of death was not initially given, Angela later wrote an article for The Players' Tribune in September, entitled "Resilient", on the subject, announcing that Victoria took her own life. The Lee family shut down their family-owned MMA training facility in Waipahu, Hawaii, and said it would remain permanently closed.

== Achievements ==
(gold) 2020 Pankration Junior World Champion, Hawaii (−57 kg)

(gold) 2019 Pankration Junior World Champion, Hawaii (−57 kg)

(gold) 2019 IMMAF Wrestling Junior World Champion, Hawaii (−57 kg)

(gold) 2020 IMMAF Wrestling Junior State Champion, Hawaii (−57 kg)

== Mixed martial arts record ==
Professional record breakdown
3 matches	3 wins	0 losses
By knockout	1	0
By submission	2	0

Res.	Record	Opponent	Method	Event	Date	Round	Time	Location	Notes
Win	3–0	Victória Souza	TKO (punches)	ONE: Revolution	September 24, 2021	2	3:58	Kallang, Singapore	
Win	2–0	Wang Luping	Submission (triangle armbar)	ONE: Battleground	July 30, 2021	1	3:22	Kallang, Singapore	
Win	1–0	Sunisa Srisan	Submission (rear-naked choke)	ONE: Fists Of Fury	February 26, 2021	2	1:03	Kallang, Singapore	

== See also ==
- List of current ONE fighters
