= Masato =

- Gender: Male

Origin
- Origin: Japanese

Masato (written: 正人, 雅人, 理人, 眞人, 聖人, 聖仁, 真人, 典人 or 正外) is a masculine Japanese given name. Notable people with the name include:

- Masato (kickboxer) (born 1979), Japanese former welterweight kickboxer, won K-1 WORLD MAX kickboxing tournament in 2003, 2008
- Masato Amada (born 1974), Japanese voice actor
- Masato Furuoya (古尾谷 雅人; 1957–2003), Japanese actor
- Masato Hagiwara (born 1971), Japanese actor
- Masato Harada (born 1949), Japanese film director and actor
- Masato Hatanaka (born 1975), Japanese musician
- Masato Hayakawa (born 1986), Japanese singer and musician
- Masato Ichishiki (born 1971), author of the SD Gundam comics
- Masato Ishioka (石岡 正人; born 1960), Japanese film director and screenwriter
- Masato Jinbo (神保 昌登), Japanese anime director and screenwriter
- Masato Kato (加藤 正人; born 1963), Japanese game developer and scenario writer
- Masato Kawabata (born 1977), professional drifting driver
- Masato Kitera, Japanese diplomat
- Masato Kurogi (born 1989), Japanese football player for Cerezo Osaka
- Masato Mihara (三原 正人; born 1959), Japanese judoka
- Masato Morishige (born 1987), Japanese football player for F.C. Tokyo
- Masato Nakamura (born 1958), member of the band Dreams Come True
- Masato Nakamura (baseball) (中村 真人; born 1982), Japanese baseball player
- Masato Nagai a Japanese anime singer
- Masato Osugi (大杉 誠人; born 1983), Japanese footballer
- Masato Saito (斉藤 雅人; born 1975), Japanese footballer
- Masato Sakai (born 1973), Japanese actor
- Masato Tachibana (橘 典人; born 1972), Japanese weightlifter
- Masato Takaki (高木 正人; born 1966), Japanese sailor
- Masato Watanabe (渡辺 正人; born 1979), Japanese baseball player
- Masato Yokoyama (born 1964), perpetrator of the Sarin gas attack on the Tokyo subway
- Masato Yoshii (born 1965), Japanese professional baseball player

== Fictional characters ==
- Masato (Pokémon), known in English as Max, a character in Pokémon and Ash & Pikachu
- Masato Inohara, a character in Little Busters!
- Masato Jin from Tokumei Sentai Go-Busters
- Masato Kusaka of Kamen Rider 555
- Masato Mishima of Kamen Rider Kabuto
- Masato Sanjouin from Sailor Moon
- Masato Wakamatsu of Miyuki
- Masato Yamanobe, a character in the manga Phoenix (Hi no Tori)
- Masato Hijirikawa, a character from the Uta no Prince-sama series.
- Masato Kageura, a character in the manga World Trigger.

== See also ==
- Masato, Peruvian Amazonian regional variation of the fermented beverage chicha
