= Angela Lee =

American-Canadian mixed martial artist (born 1996)

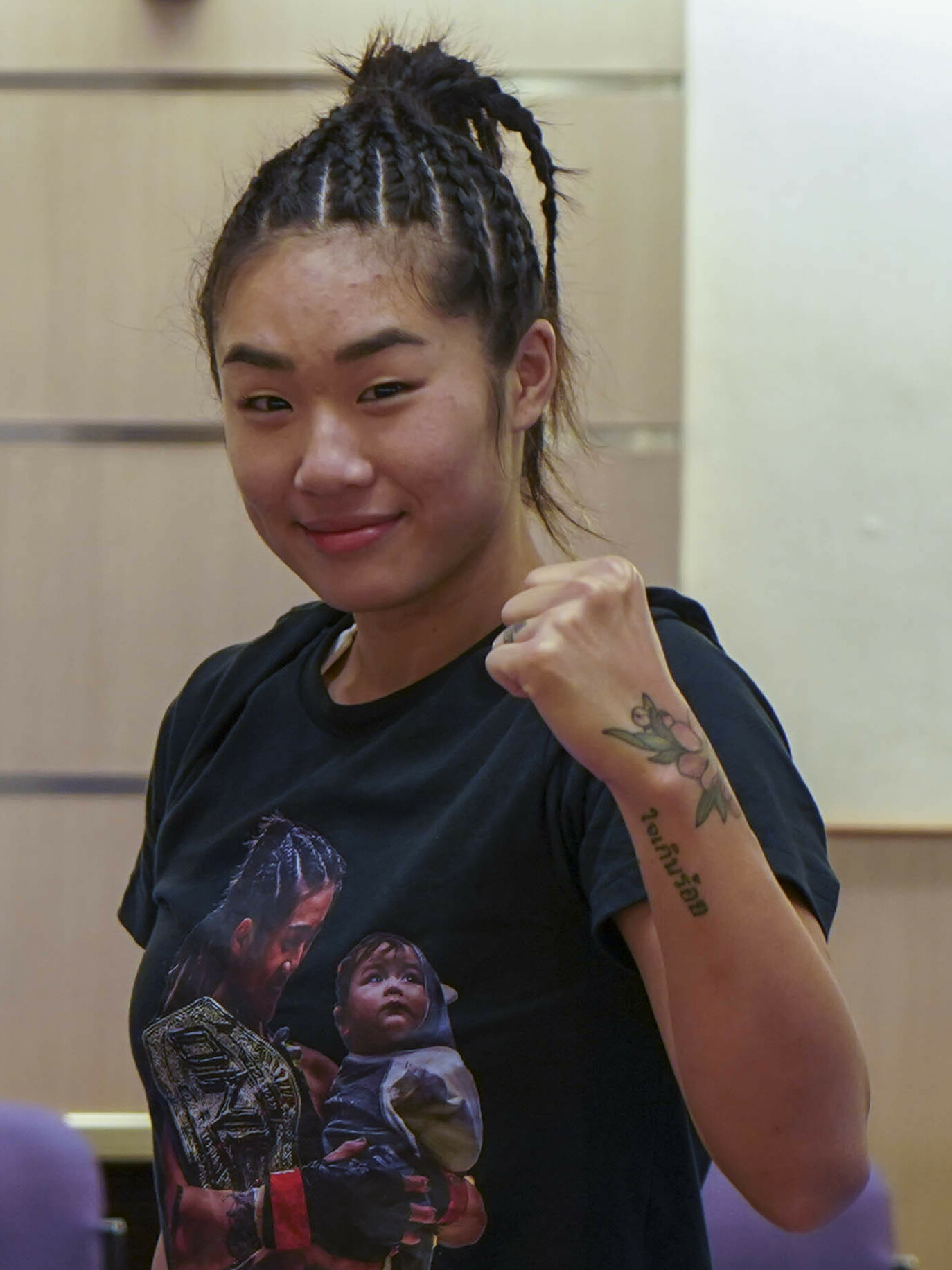
- Lee in 2022
- Born: Angela Seung Ju Lee; July 8, 1996 (age 30); Vancouver, British Columbia, Canada
- Native name: 李胜珠 (Li Shengzhu) 이승주 (Lee Seung-ju)
- Nickname: Unstoppable
- Nationality: American • Canadian
- Height: 5 ft 4 in (1.63 m)
- Weight: 124 lb (56.2 kg; 8.9 st)
- Division: Atomweight; Strawweight
- Reach: 67 in (170 cm)
- Style: Pankration, Taekwondo, BJJ, Muay Thai, Wrestling
- Stance: Orthodox
- Fighting out of: Tanjong Katong, Singapore
- Team: Evolve MMA; United MMA
- Rank: 1st degree black belt in Taekwondo; Black belt in Brazilian Jiu-Jitsu under Mike Fowler and Ken Lee
- Years active: 2015–2023

Mixed martial arts record
- Total: 14
- Wins: 11
- By knockout: 1
- By submission: 8
- By decision: 2
- Losses: 3
- By knockout: 1
- By decision: 2

Other information
- Spouse: Bruno Pucci (m. 2018)
- Notable relatives: Christian Lee (brother); Victoria Lee (sister)
- Mixed martial arts record from Sherdog

Angela Seung Ju Pucci (née Lee, Chinese: 李胜珠, Korean: 이승주, born July 8, 1996), also known as Angela Lee Pucci, is a Canadian-born American combat sports mental health advocate and former professional mixed martial artist. She competed in the atomweight and strawweight divisions of ONE Championship, where she was the inaugural ONE Atomweight World Champion. Undefeated at atomweight, Lee successfully defended the belt five times before vacating the title when she retired from the sport in September 2023. She holds the record for longest-championship reign in ONE history at more than seven years.

On May 5, 2016, Lee became the youngest person to ever win a world title in MMA by defeating Mei Yamaguchi to win the inaugural ONE Atomweight World Championship at 19 years old and 9 months. When her younger brother Christian Lee won the ONE Lightweight World Championship in May 2019, they became the first sister-brother pair of mixed martial arts world champions. Following the death of her younger sister Victoria, Lee announced her retirement from MMA at ONE Fight Night 14 on September 30, 2023.

== Background ==
Lee was born in Vancouver to a Chinese-Singaporean father Ken Lee and a South Korean-born Canadian mother Jewelz Lee. She moved to Hawaii with her family at age 7. Her parents are both martial artists, so she began training at a young age and competing at age 6. Her younger brother Christian is also an MMA fighter and her other younger brother Adrian (born in Waipahu), also trains in martial arts. Lee's younger sister Victoria, who was also a mixed martial artist signed to ONE, died in 2022 at the age of 18.

In 2011, Angela Lee won her division at the USA Amateur pankration national championships, and the next year, she claimed her division at the World Pangration Athlima Federation world championships in Greece. Lee was awarded her Brazilian Jiu-Jitsu black belt on February 9, 2018, by third-degree black belt Mike Fowler and her father Ken Lee, who is also a black belt.

== Mixed martial arts career ==
In 2014, Lee made her amateur debut, and in November of that year she won an amateur title by beating Audrey Perkins at Destiny MMA: Na Koa 7 in Honolulu to become the Destiny MMA strawweight champion.

=== ONE Championship ===
Lee signed with ONE Championship in 2014 and made her promotional debut at ONE Championship 28: Warrior's Quest on May 22, 2015, submitting Aya Saber with an armbar in the opening round. She competes under Singapore flags.

Following the win, Lee dropped out of college in Hawaii (she was studying business) and moved to Singapore to join Evolve MMA. In her next fight, she used a rear naked choke hold to beat Mona Samir at ONE Championship: Odyssey of Champions on September 27, 2015, in the first round.

Lee's third professional fight was at ONE Championship 33: Pride of Lions on November 13, 2015, and she submitted Natalie Gonzales Hills with a twister in the opening round in what commentators described as a potential submission of the year contender. She subsequently won the 2015 WMMA Press Award for Submission of the Year.

Next, she faced Lena Tkhorevska at ONE Championship 36: Spirit of Champions on December 11, 2015, and won with a rear naked choke in the second round. Lee's first fight of 2016 was against Rebecca Heintzman at ONE Championship 39: Tribe of Warriors on February 20, 2016, and she won with a second round neck crank.

Lee's reward for submitting her first five opponents was a shot at the inaugural ONE Championship Atomweight Women's Title against Japanese veteran Mei Yamaguchi at ONE Championship 42: Ascent to Power on May 6, 2016. Winning the fight would make her the youngest-ever MMA world champion.

Lee won the fight by unanimous decision to become the inaugural ONE Women's Atomweight Champion, and received a $68,200 SGD bonus for her performance. The MMA media described her fight with Yamaguchi as a Fight of the Year contender. She subsequently signed a new contract with ONE Championship. Commentators speculated that her new contract made Lee the highest paid teenager in the history of MMA, male or female.

On March 11, 2017, Angela Lee defeated Jenny Huang of Taiwan and retained the Atomweight World Championship title. On May 27, 2017, she was successful in her second title defense against Istela Nunes of Brazil.

On November 8, 2017, Chatri Sityodtong announced that Angela Lee was involved in a serious car accident after she had reportedly fallen asleep at the wheel of her car. In 2023, Lee revealed that this was actually a deliberate suicide attempt. She managed to survive the incident with a concussion and minor burns. Lee's bout with Mei Yamaguchi that was scheduled for November 24 was rescheduled to May 18, 2018, at One Championship Unstoppable Dreams in Singapore. Lee won via unanimous decision.

Lee was expected to face reigning strawweight champion Jingnan Xiong at ONE Championship 78: Heart of the Lion on November 9, 2018, in an attempt to become the first female two-division champion in ONE Championship. However, on November 5, 2018, Lee revealed that she was forced off the card due to a back injury. The fight eventually happened on March 31, 2019, at One Championship 90: A New Era. Lee was defeated via TKO in round 5, which snapped her undefeated streak.

At ONE Championship 96: Masters of Destiny, Angela Lee suffered another defeat at the hands of Michelle Nicolini, via unanimous decision.

Lee next defended her ONE Atomweight Championship against Xiong Jingnan – whose Strawweight Championship Lee failed to capture – at ONE Championship 100: Century on October 13, 2019. She won the fight by submission in the fifth round.

After pregnancy leave, Lee returned to defend her Atomweight title against ONE Women's Atomweight Grand Prix winner Stamp Fairtex at ONE 155: X on March 26, 2022. Surviving an early scare in the first round after being hurt by a liver punch, she won the bout via submission in the second round. In April 2022, Fight Matrix ranked Lee the #12 female strawweight (121.9 lbs and below) in the world.

Lee challenged Xiong Jingnan for the ONE Women's Strawweight Championship at ONE on Prime Video 2 on September 30, 2022. She lost the fight by unanimous decision.

At ONE Fight Night 14 on September 30, 2023, Lee announced her retirement from mixed martial arts and vacated the title during the event. Speaking to ESPN, she said, "It's just really tough because my sister was also a fighter, my whole family is fighters, my dad was our coach. And because everything was so, I guess, intertwined and connected that's one of the big factors [why] I'm stepping away, because it's just very difficult to go on." As a result, the interim title bout between Stamp Fairtex and Ham Seo-hee at the event was promoted to be for the vacant title.

== Personal life ==
Lee holds American and Canadian citizenship. She is married to fellow mixed martial artist Bruno Pucci. On October 1, 2020, Lee announced on her social media that she was pregnant. She gave birth to a daughter in April 2021. Both Lee and her husband are head coaches at United BJJ Hawaii, a gym that they founded in 2021. The opening of their gym was delayed by several days as the result of vandalism just prior to the date.

Lee's younger brother Christian is a former ONE Lightweight World Champion and ONE Welterweight World Champion. Her youngest sibling, Victoria, made her successful MMA debut at the age of 16 on February 26, 2021. On January 7, 2023, Lee announced on Instagram that Victoria had died on December 26, 2022. The Lees shut down their family-owned MMA training facility in Waipahu, Hawaii, and said it would remain permanently closed.

On September 19, 2023, Lee wrote in an article on the Players' Tribune that her 2017 car crash in Hawaii was a suicide attempt, and also revealed that her sister Victoria, who died in 2022 at the age of 18, had taken her own life. These incidents motivated her to set up a non-profit organisation, FIGHTSTORY, putting out podcast and videos on mental health, as well as a programme to help people with their nutrition and physical health.

== Championships and accomplishments ==
=== Pankration ===
- World Pangration Athlima Federation World Championships:
  - 2012 Agon (full contact) Girls, 16-17 yrs, 58 kg - Champion.
  - 2012 Semi (semi contact) Girls, Juniors, 58 kg - Champion.

=== Folkstyle wrestling ===
- HHSAA Wrestling Circuit
  - 2013, 121 lbs, Girls - Champion.

=== Mixed martial arts ===
- Amateur Career
  - Destiny MMA Women's Strawweight Championship (One time)
- ONE Championship
  - ONE Women's Atomweight World Championship (One time; inaugural)
    - Five successful title defenses
    - Longest-championship reign in ONE history (2,703 days)
  - Performance of the Night (One time) vs. Stamp Fairtex
  - 2016 Fight of the Year vs. Mei Yamaguchi
  - 2022 MMA Fight of the Year vs. Stamp Fairtex at ONE: X
- WMMA Press Association
  - 2015 Newcomer of the Year
  - 2015 Submission of the Year vs. Natalie Gonzales Hills
- World MMA Awards
  - 2018 Comeback of the Year vs. Mei Yamaguchi at ONE Championship: Unstoppable Dreams
- MMA Junkie
  - 2016 #4 Ranked Fight of the Year vs. Mei Yamaguchi at ONE: Ascent to Power
  - 2016 May Fight of the Month vs. Mei Yamaguchi

== Mixed martial arts record ==
Professional record breakdown
14 matches	11 wins	3 losses
By knockout	1	1
By submission	8	0
By decision	2	2

Res.	Record	Opponent	Method	Event	Date	Round	Time	Location	Notes
Loss	11–3	Xiong Jing Nan	Decision (unanimous)	ONE on Prime Video 2	October 1, 2022	5	5:00	Kallang, Singapore	For the ONE Women's Strawweight Championship (125 lb).
Win	11–2	Stamp Fairtex	Submission (rear-naked choke)	ONE: X	March 26, 2022	2	4:50	Kallang, Singapore	Defended the ONE Women's Atomweight Championship (115 lb). Performance of the Night. Lee vacated the title on September 30, 2023 due to her retirement.
Win	10–2	Xiong Jing Nan	Submission (rear-naked choke)	ONE: Century – Part 1	October 13, 2019	5	4:48	Tokyo, Japan	Return to 115 lb. Defended the ONE Women's Atomweight Championship (115 lb).
Loss	9–2	Michelle Nicolini	Decision (unanimous)	ONE: Masters of Destiny	July 12, 2019	3	5:00	Kuala Lumpur, Malaysia	
Loss	9–1	Xiong Jing Nan	TKO (body kicks and punches)	ONE: A New Era	March 31, 2019	5	1:37	Tokyo, Japan	Strawweight (125 lb) debut. For the ONE Women's Strawweight Championship (125 lb).
Win	9–0	Mei Yamaguchi	Decision (unanimous)	ONE: Unstoppable Dreams	May 18, 2018	5	5:00	Kallang, Singapore	Defended the ONE Women's Atomweight Championship (115 lb).
Win	8–0	Istela Nunes	Submission (anaconda choke)	ONE: Dynasty of Heroes	May 26, 2017	2	2:18	Kallang, Singapore	Defended the ONE Women's Atomweight Championship (115 lb).
Win	7–0	Jenny Huang	TKO (punches)	ONE: Warrior Kingdom	March 11, 2017	3	3:37	Bangkok, Thailand	Defended the ONE Women's Atomweight Championship (115 lb).
Win	6–0	Mei Yamaguchi	Decision (unanimous)	ONE: Ascent to Power	May 6, 2016	5	5:00	Kallang, Singapore	Won the inaugural ONE Women's Atomweight Championship (115 lb).
Win	5–0	Rebecca Heintzman	Submission (neck crank)	ONE: Tribe of Warriors	February 20, 2016	2	1:08	Jakarta, Indonesia	Catchweight (120 lb) bout.
Win	4–0	Lena Tkhorevska	Submission (rear-naked choke)	ONE: Spirit of Champions	Dec 11, 2015	2	3:26	Manila, Philippines	
Win	3–0	Natalie Gonzales Hills	Submission (twister)	ONE: Pride of Lions	Nov 13, 2015	1	2:24	Kallang, Singapore	
Win	2–0	Mona Samir	Submission (rear-naked choke)	ONE: Odyssey of Champions	Sep 27, 2015	1	3:49	Jakarta, Indonesia	Catchweight (120 lb) bout.
Win	1–0	Aya Saber	Submission (armbar)	ONE: Warrior's Quest	May 22, 2015	1	1:43	Kallang, Singapore	Strawweight debut.

== See also ==
- List of Chinese Americans
- List of Chinese Canadians
- List of female mixed martial artists
- List of Korean Americans
- List of Korean Canadians
- List of ONE Championship champions
