= Bruno Pucci =

Brazilian practitioner of Brazilian Jiu-Jitsu and mixed martial arts

- Born: Bruno Francisco Vicentini Pucci; July 23, 1990 (age 36); Curitiba, Paraná, Brazil
- Other names: Puccibull
- Height: 5 ft 9 in (1.75 m)
- Weight: 155 lb (70 kg; 11.1 st)
- Division: Featherweight; Bantamweight
- Style: Brazilian Jiu-Jitsu, Muay Thai, Submission Wrestling
- Stance: Orthodox
- Fighting out of: Tanjong Katong, Singapore
- Team: Evolve MMA; Checkmat BJJ (former)
- Rank: Black belt in Brazilian Jiu-Jitsu
- Years active: 2012–present

Mixed martial arts record
- Total: 13
- Wins: 7
- By knockout: 1
- By submission: 6
- Losses: 6
- By knockout: 4
- By decision: 2

Other information
- Spouse: Angela Lee (m. 2018)
- Notable students: Victoria Lee
- Mixed martial arts record from Sherdog

Bruno Pucci
Medal record

Representing Brazil

Submission Wrestling

No Gi Grappling World Championship
Gold medal – first place	2009 Long Beach	-70 kg
Gold medal – first place	2010 Long Beach	-70 kg

Brazilian Jiu Jitsu

World Jiu-Jitsu Championship
Bronze medal – third place	2009 Long Beach	-70 kg

Bruno Francisco Vicentini Pucci (born July 23, 1990) known professionally as Bruno Pucci is a Brazilian Jiu-Jitsu practitioner who holds a black belt and is best known for winning gold in the featherweight division at the 2009 and 2010 No Gi Grappling World Championships. In total, Pucci has secured podium finishes five times at the World Championship both with Gi and No Gi. He was also a mixed martial artist who fought in ONE Championship.

== Background ==
As a child Pucci had growth problems and needed hormone replacement because he was always short and weak. The treatment made him overweight and he wanted to take up a sport and chose Brazilian jiu-jitsu, eventually becoming a BJJ black belt under Sebastian Lalli at Checkmat in Brazil.

== Mixed martial arts career ==
=== Early career ===
Pucci made his MMA debut on October 15, 2011 and submitted Raoni Tavares in the opening round at Adventure Fighters Tournament in Paraná. His next fight was on October 20, 2012, and he submitted Fernando Cabral in the opening round at Empire FC in Paraná.

In November 2012 Pucci moved to Singapore to join the fight team at Evolve MMA which included fellow Brazilians Rafael Dos Anjos and Leandro Issa.

=== ONE Championship ===
On June 10, 2013 it was announced that Pucci would be fighting Bashir Ahmad at ONE FC: Champions & Warriors. He won the fight via submission in the opening round.

On May 30, 2014, Pucci faced Major Overall at ONE FC: Honor and Glory, suffering his first loss by first-round knockout via punches and a soccer kick.

Pucci bounced back on December 11, 2015 at ONE Championship: Spirit of Champions with a submission win over Anthony Engelen.

On September 2, 2016, Pucci was knocked out in 8 seconds by Bahetihan Nuertiebieke at ONE Championship: Unbreakable Warriors. Unofficially, this is the second-fastest knockout in ONE Championship history.

On June 30, 2017, Bruno Pucci secured his first TKO victory against Jimmy Yabo at ONE Championship: Light of a Nation.

On January 26, 2018, Pucci lost by first-round knockout to Emilio Urrutia at ONE Championship: Global Superheroes.

On November 17, 2018, Pucci submitted Xie Chao in under one minute at ONE Championship: Warrior's Dream.

Pucci picked up his second consecutive victory against former ONE Lightweight Champion Kotetsu Boku at ONE Championship: Eternal Glory on January 19, 2019.

On November 22, 2019, Pucci made his bantamweight debut against Shuya Kamikubo at ONE Championship: Edge Of Greatness. He lost by unanimous decision.

Pucci lost his next fight against Kwon Won Il by first-round knockout at ONE Championship: Inside the Matrix 4 on November 20, 2020.

Pucci faced Kirill Gorobets on November 19, 2022, at ONE 163. He lost the fight via unanimous decision.

== Grappling career ==
Pucci faced Dante Leon at ONE Fight Night 26 on December 6, 2024. He lost the match by submission.

== Personal life ==
Pucci is married to former MMA fighter Angela Lee. Both Pucci and his wife are head coaches at United BJJ Hawaii, a gym that they founded in 2020. The opening of their gym was delayed by several days as the result of vandalism just prior to the date. After Victoria Lee's death, the Lees shut down their family-owned MMA training facility in Waipahu, Hawaii, and said it would remain permanently closed.

== Mixed martial arts record ==
Professional record breakdown
13 matches	7 wins	6 losses
By knockout	1	4
By submission	6	0
By decision	0	2

Res.	Record	Opponent	Method	Event	Date	Round	Time	Location	Notes
Loss	7–6	Kirill Gorobets	Decision (unanimous)	ONE 163	November 19, 2022	3	5:00	Kallang, Singapore	Return to Lightweight.
Loss	7–5	Kwon Won-il	TKO (punches)	ONE: Inside the Matrix 4	November 20, 2020	1	2:00	Kallang, Singapore	
Loss	7–4	Shuya Kamikubo	Decision (unanimous)	ONE: Edge of Greatness	November 22, 2019	3	5:00	Kallang, Singapore	Return to Featherweight.
Win	7–3	Kotetsu Boku	Submission (rear-naked choke)	ONE: Eternal Glory	January 19, 2019	1	3:32	Jakarta, Indonesia	
Win	6–3	Xie Chao	Submission (guillotine choke)	ONE: Warrior's Dream	November 17, 2018	1	0:56	Jakarta, Indonesia	
Loss	5–3	Emilio Urrutia	KO (punches)	ONE: Global Superheroes	January 26, 2018	1	3:33	Pasay, Philippines	Lightweight debut.
Win	5–2	Jimmy Yabo	TKO (elbows and punches)	ONE: Light of a Nation	June 30, 2017	1	2:12	Yangon, Myanmar	
Loss	4–2	Bahetihan Nuertiebieke	KO (punch)	ONE: Unbreakable Warriors	September 2, 2016	1	0:08	Kuala Lumpur, Malaysia	
Win	4–1	Anthony Engelen	Submission (rear-naked choke)	ONE: Spirit of Champions	December 11, 2015	2	2:19	Pasay, Philippines	
Loss	3–1	Major Overall	KO (punch and soccer kick)	ONE FC: Honor and Glory	May 30, 2014	1	2:52	Kallang, Singapore	
Win	3–0	Bashir Ahmad	Submission (rear-naked choke)	ONE FC: Champions and Warriors	September 13, 2013	1	3:13	Jakarta, Indonesia	
Win	2–0	Fernando Cabral	Submission (rear-naked choke)	Empire FC 1	October 30, 2012	1	3:08	Paraná, Brazil	
Win	1–0	Raoni Tavares	Submission (rear-naked choke)	Adventure Fighters Tournament 3	October 15, 2011	2	2:09	Paraná, Brazil	Featherweight debut.
