= Marcin Prachnio =

Polish mixed martial artist

- Born: July 14, 1988 (age 38); Warsaw, Poland
- Height: 6 ft 3 in (1.91 m)
- Weight: 205 lb (93 kg; 14 st 9 lb)
- Division: Heavyweight; Light Heavyweight; Middleweight
- Reach: 74 in (188 cm)
- Style: Kyokushin karate
- Fighting out of: Amsterdam, Netherlands
- Team: Tatsujin Dojo (2013–present)
- Rank: Black belt in Kyokushinkai Karate; Blue belt in Brazilian Jiu-Jitsu
- Years active: 2013–present

Mixed martial arts record
- Total: 27
- Wins: 17
- By knockout: 11
- By submission: 1
- By decision: 5
- Losses: 10
- By knockout: 4
- By submission: 4
- By decision: 2

Other information
- Mixed martial arts record from Sherdog

Marcin Prachnio (born July 14, 1988) is a Polish mixed martial artist currently competing in the Light Heavyweight division. A professional mixed martial artist since 2013, Prachnio has competed in the Ultimate Fighting Championship, ONE Championship and Final Fight Championship.

== Background ==
After three years of requesting his parents for permission, Prachnio started training karate at the age of 12. Eventually he became multiple-time Polish champion in kyokushin karate and placed second in European championships. Seeking for new challenges, Prachnio moved to Amsterdam in 2013 in order to transition to mixed martial arts.

== Mixed martial arts career ==
=== Early career ===
Prachnio started his professional mixed martial arts career in 2013, competing solely in European regional circuit. He fought multiple times in Final Fight Championship promotion, eventually racking up a 9–2 record and claiming the promotion's Light Heavyweight Championship in the process. Prachnio decided to drop to middleweight and not defend his title, leading the title to be vacated.

=== ONE Championship ===
After claiming and vacating the Final Fight Championship title, Prachnio signed with the ONE Championship in 2016. Despite previous intentions to drop down to middleweight, he made his promotional debut in heavyweight division against Alexandre Machado at ONE: Tribe of Warriors on February 20, 2016. He won the bout via knockout in the first round.

Prachnio was scheduled to face Vitaly Bigdash for the ONE Middleweight World Championship bout on January 14, 2017, at ONE: Quest for Power. However, Prachnio was forced to withdraw due to injury and was replaced by Aung La Nsang.

He amassed an undefeated 4–0 run in the promotion and was in the title contention before signing with the UFC.

=== Ultimate Fighting Championship ===
The successful run in the ONE FC resulted in a contract with the UFC in 2018. In his promotional debut he faced Sam Alvey on February 24, 2018 at UFC on Fox 28. He lost the fight via knockout in the first round.

In his sophomore bout in the organization, Prachnio faced Magomed Ankalaev on September 15, 2018 at UFC Fight Night: Hunt vs. Oleinik. He lost the bout via knockout in the first round.

Prachnio faced Mike Rodríguez on August 22, 2020 at UFC on ESPN 15. He lost the fight via knockout in the first round.

Prachnio faced Khalil Rountree Jr. on January 24, 2021 at UFC 257. He won the fight via unanimous decision.

Prachnio faced Ike Villanueva on June 26, 2021 at UFC Fight Night 190. He won the fight via knockout out in round two. This fight earned him the Performance of the Night award.

Prachnio was scheduled to face Azamat Murzakanov on November 20, 2021 at UFC Fight Night 198. However, the bout was later scrapped due to visa issues.

Prachnio faced Philipe Lins on April 23, 2022 at UFC Fight Night 205. He lost the fight via unanimous decision.

Prachnio was scheduled to face William Knight on November 19, 2022, at UFC Fight Night 215. However, the bout was scrapped the week of the event for undisclosed reasons. The bout was rescheduled for UFC Fight Night 219 on February 18, 2023. He won the fight via unanimous decision.

Prachnio faced Vitor Petrino on July 8, 2023, at UFC 290. He lost the fight via an arm-triangle choke submission in the third round.

Prachnio faced Devin Clark on February 10, 2024, at UFC Fight Night 236. He won the bout by unanimous decision.

Prachnio faced Modestas Bukauskas on July 27, 2024, at UFC 304. He lost the fight by an arm-triangle choke submission in the third round.

Prachnio was scheduled to face Jimmy Crute on February 9, 2025, at UFC 312. However, Prachnio withdrew from the fight for unknown reasons and was replaced by Rodolfo Bellato.

Prachnio's bout with Jimmy Crute was re-scheduled and took place on July 19, 2025 at UFC 318. He lost the fight via an armbar submission at the end of the first round.

On December 16, 2025, it was reported that Prachino was released by the UFC.

== Championships and accomplishments ==
=== Mixed martial arts ===
- Ultimate Fighting Championships
  - Performance of the Night (One time) vs. Isaac Villanueva
- Final Fight Championship
  - Final Fight Championship Light Heavyweight Championship (One time)

== Mixed martial arts record ==
Professional record breakdown
| 27 matches | 17 wins | 10 losses |
| By knockout | 11 | 4 |
| By submission | 1 | 4 |
| By decision | 5 | 2 |

| Res. | Record | Opponent | Method | Event | Date | Round | Time | Location | Notes |
|---|---|---|---|---|---|---|---|---|---|
| Loss | 17–10 | Tom Breese | Submission (rear-naked choke) | FNC 32 | June 20, 2026 | 1 | 1:10 | Osijek, Croatia | |
| Loss | 17–9 | Jimmy Crute | Submission (armbar) | UFC 318 | July 19, 2025 | 1 | 4:41 | New Orleans, Louisiana, United States | |
| Loss | 17–8 | Modestas Bukauskas | Submission (arm-triangle choke) | UFC 304 | July 27, 2024 | 3 | 3:12 | Manchester, England | |
| Win | 17–7 | Devin Clark | Decision (unanimous) | UFC Fight Night: Hermansson vs. Pyfer | February 10, 2024 | 3 | 5:00 | Las Vegas, Nevada, United States | |
| Loss | 16–7 | Vitor Petrino | Submission (arm-triangle choke) | UFC 290 | July 8, 2023 | 3 | 3:42 | Las Vegas, Nevada, United States | |
| Win | 16–6 | William Knight | Decision (unanimous) | UFC Fight Night: Andrade vs. Blanchfield | February 18, 2023 | 3 | 5:00 | Las Vegas, Nevada, United States | |
| Loss | 15–6 | Philipe Lins | Decision (unanimous) | UFC Fight Night: Lemos vs. Andrade | April 23, 2022 | 3 | 5:00 | Las Vegas, Nevada, United States | |
| Win | 15–5 | Ike Villanueva | KO (body kick) | UFC Fight Night: Gane vs. Volkov | June 26, 2021 | 2 | 0:56 | Las Vegas, Nevada, United States | Performance of the Night. |
| Win | 14–5 | Khalil Rountree Jr. | Decision (unanimous) | UFC 257 | January 24, 2021 | 3 | 5:00 | Abu Dhabi, United Arab Emirates | |
| Loss | 13–5 | Mike Rodríguez | KO (elbow and punches) | UFC on ESPN: Munhoz vs. Edgar | August 22, 2020 | 1 | 2:17 | Las Vegas, Nevada, United States | |
| Loss | 13–4 | Magomed Ankalaev | TKO (head kick and punches) | UFC Fight Night: Hunt vs. Oleinik | September 15, 2018 | 1 | 3:09 | Moscow, Russia | |
| Loss | 13–3 | Sam Alvey | KO (punch) | UFC on Fox: Emmett vs. Stephens | February 24, 2018 | 1 | 4:23 | Orlando, Florida, United States | |
| Win | 13–2 | Gilberto Galvão | KO (punch) | ONE: Kings & Conquerors | August 5, 2017 | 1 | 1:23 | Macau, SAR, China | Middleweight bout. |
| Win | 12–2 | Jake Butler | TKO (knees) | ONE: Titles & Titans | August 27, 2016 | 1 | 2:30 | Jakarta, Indonesia | Return to Light Heavyweight. |
| Win | 11–2 | Leandro Ataides | Decision (split) | ONE: Kingdom of Champions | May 27, 2016 | 3 | 5:00 | Bangkok, Thailand | Middleweight debut. |
| Win | 10–2 | Alexandre Machado | TKO (punches) | ONE: Tribe of Warriors | February 20, 2016 | 1 | 2:44 | Jakarta, Indonesia | Heavyweight debut. |
| Win | 9–2 | Tomislav Spahović | TKO (punches) | Final Fight Championship 21 | November 27, 2015 | 1 | 3:22 | Rijeka, Croatia | Won the vacant Final Fight Light Heavyweight Championship. |
| Win | 8–2 | Matej Batinić | Decision (unanimous) | Final Fight Championship 19 | September 18, 2015 | 3 | 5:00 | Linz, Austria | |
| Win | 7–2 | Ryan Salamagnou | TKO (punches) | HIT Fighting Championship 1 | June 27, 2015 | 1 | 0:21 | Zürich, Switzerland | |
| Win | 6–2 | Elvir Cosic | TKO (punches) | Bosnian Fight Championship 2 | June 13, 2015 | 1 | 1:34 | Sarajevo, Bosnia and Herzegovina | |
| Loss | 5–2 | Aleksandar Rakić | TKO (punches) | Final Fight Championship 16 | December 6, 2014 | 3 | 3:00 | Vienna, Austria | |
| Win | 5–1 | Stepjan Bekavac | TKO (knees) | Final Fight Championship 14 | October 3, 2014 | 1 | 0:35 | Ljubljana, Slovenia | |
| Win | 4–1 | Milco Voorn | TKO (punches) | Fight Club Den Haag 2014 | June 22, 2014 | 1 | 3:40 | The Hague, Netherlands | |
| Win | 3–1 | Bozo Mikulic | TKO (punches) | Final Fight Championship 13 | June 6, 2014 | 1 | 2:56 | Zadar, Croatia | |
| Loss | 2–1 | Ivica Tadijanov | Decision (unanimous) | Final Fight Championship 11 | April 4, 2014 | 3 | 5:00 | Osijek, Croatia | |
| Win | 2–0 | Milan Vinčić | Submission (rear-naked choke) | Bosnian Fight Championship 1 | November 9, 2013 | 1 | 1:46 | Sarajevo, Bosnia and Herzegovina | |
| Win | 1–0 | Tomas Siaucila | KO (punch) | Ultimate Warrior Challenge 23 | July 13, 2013 | 1 | 1:11 | Essex, England | |

== See also ==
- List of male mixed martial artists
