= Shannon Wiratchai =

Thai mixed martial arts fighter

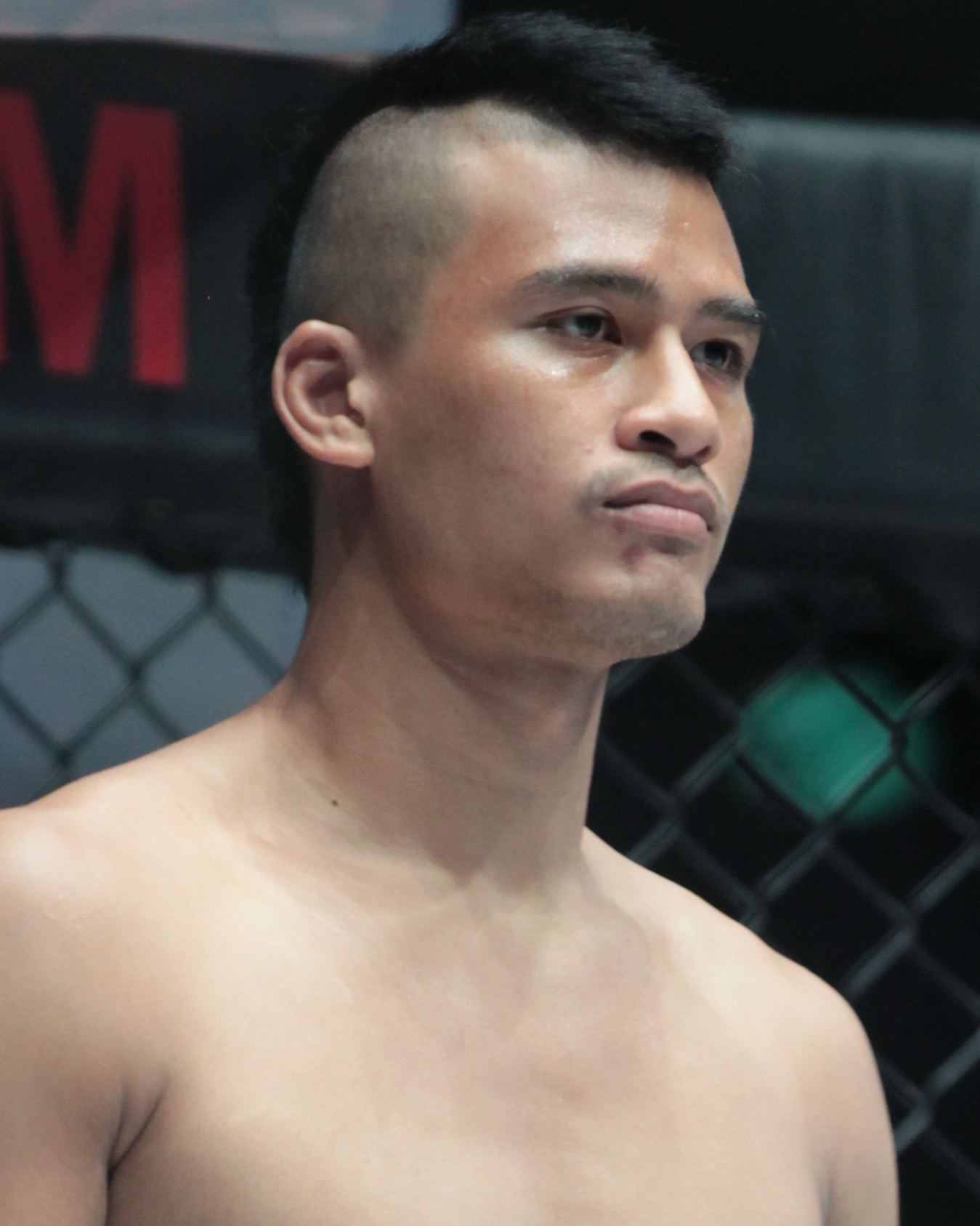
- Wiratchai in 2013
- Born: Chanonpat Wiratchai; 14 November 1988 (age 37); Bangkok, Thailand
- Other names: OneShin
- Height: 175 cm (5 ft 9 in)
- Weight: 70.3 kg (155 lb; 11 st)
- Division: Featherweight (Note: ONE refers to their 145 lb division as Bantamweight, but per the Association of Boxing Commissions in the United States, 145 lbs is considered Featherweight.) (2011–2016); Lightweight (Note: ONE refers to their 155 lb division as Featherweight, but per the Association of Boxing Commissions in the United States, 155 lbs is considered Lightweight.) (2016–2017, 2020–present); Welterweight (Note: ONE refers to their 170 lb division as Lightweight, but per the Association of Boxing Commissions in the United States, 170 lbs is considered Welterweight.) (2017–2019)
- Reach: 70.0 in (178 cm)
- Stance: Southpaw
- Fighting out of: Bangkok, Thailand
- Team: Bangtao Muay Thai & MMA; Bangkok Fight Lab; Tiger Muay Thai (former); BurnShellTeam (former)
- Rank: Black belt in Judo; Blue belt in Brazilian Jiu-Jitsu
- Years active: 2011–Present

Mixed martial arts record
- Total: 19
- Wins: 11
- By knockout: 6
- By submission: 2
- By decision: 3
- Losses: 7
- By knockout: 2
- By submission: 1
- By decision: 4
- No contests: 1

Other information
- Mixed martial arts record from Sherdog

Shannon Wiratchai (Thai: ชนนภัทร วิรัชชัย; born November 14, 1988) is a Thai mixed martial artist who competes in the Featherweight division. He was last signed to ONE Championship, where he also previously competed as a Lightweight.

Wiratchai is a pioneer of mixed martial arts in Thailand, having made his professional debut in 2011. He is also known for his striking ability, holding the organization's record for the second-most knockouts in the ONE lightweight division, as well as the organization's second-fastest finish in lightweight history.

== Mixed martial arts career ==
=== Early career ===
Shannon Wiratchai first competed in the amateur level of MMA, fighting for the NAKSU tournament. After only making it to the semi-finals in his first year in 2009, Wiratchai would eventually win the 2010 NAKSU amateur tournament in the 75 kg class. As an amateur mixed martial artist, he held a 5–1 record.

Prior to competing in ONE Championship, Wiratchai began his career at DARE Championship–at the time the only MMA promotion in Thailand–held at Club Insomnia in Bangkok from 2011 to 2012, where he went an undefeated 2–0.

=== ONE Championship ===
==== 2012 ====
Shannon Wiratchai eventually signed with ONE Championship (then known as ONE Fighting Championship) and made his debut at ONE Fighting Championship: Pride of a Nation on August 31, 2012, facing Mitch Chilson. However, the fight was ruled a no contest when it was ruled that Shannon Wiratchai threw illegal soccer kicks, reversing what was originally a TKO win for Wiratchai.

==== 2013 ====
His next opponent was Bashir Ahmad, whom he faced at ONE Fighting Championship: Kings and Champions. Despite going the distance, Wiratchai lost by unanimous decision. However, he would bounce back in his rematch with Mitch Chilson at ONE Fighting Championship: Total Domination on October 18, 2013. This time, he won with a first-round TKO via soccer kicks and punches.

==== 2015 ====
After a period of inactivity the entirety of 2014, Shannon Wiratchai made his return on May 22, 2015 at ONE Championship: Warrior's Quest, where he faced Amir Khan. He would win the fight by split decision.

==== 2016 ====
He then picked up his first submission win with a rear naked choke victory over Kyal Linn Aung in the first round at ONE Championship: Kingdom of Champions on May 27, 2016. At ONE Championship: Unbreakable Warriors, Wiratchai defeated Peter Davis by TKO via punches in the second round.

==== 2017 ====
At ONE Championship: Warrior Kingdom on March 11, 2017, Shannon Wiratchai defeated Richard Corminal by first-round knockout in his Lightweight debut. He followed up with a 29-second, first-round knockout victory over Rajinder Singh Meena at ONE Championship: Kings and Conquerors on August 5, 2017.

However, Wiratchai's six-fight winning streak would come to an end at ONE Championship: Warriors of the World on December 9, 2017, where he lost to Rasul Yakhyaev by unanimous decision in a lightweight world title eliminator.

==== 2018 ====
He managed to score a 21-second, first-round knockout victory over Rahul Raju at ONE Championship: Iron Will, recording the second-fastest knockout in ONE lightweight history.

In what would be the biggest fight of his career, Wiratchai faced former ONE Lightweight World Champion Shinya Aoki at ONE Championship: Reign of Kings on July 27, 2018. He would lose by TKO due to ground and pound, marking the first time he was finished.

==== 2019 ====
At ONE Championship: Clash of Legends on February 16, 2019, Wiratchai lost to Amarsanaa Tsogookhuu by unanimous decision. He would be handed the first submission loss of his career via rear naked choke against Iuri Lapicus at ONE Championship: Enter the Dragon on May 17, 2019.

==== 2020 ====
Shannon Wiratchai faced former ONE Featherweight World Champion Honorio Banario at ONE Championship: King of the Jungle on February 28, 2020. The fight will mark as both athletes' return to Featherweight. Wiratchai lost to Banario by split decision.

Wiratchai faced former Muay Thai world champion Fabio Pinca, who will be making his mixed martial arts debut, at ONE Championship: No Surrender 3 on August 21, 2020. He was able to snap his four-fight losing streak and went on to defeat Pinca by split decision.

==== 2023 ====
After almost three years hiatus, Wiratchai faced Puriya Golpour on February 3, 2023, at ONE Friday Fights 3. He won the fight by first-round technical knockout. The win earned him a USD$10,000 Performance of the Night bonus.

==== Island Fighters League ====
Wiratchai is scheduled to face Shin Dong-guk on October 28, 2023, at Island Fighters League 2.

== Fighting style & MMA ventures ==
Outside of fighting, he is also an instructor of mixed martial arts and self-defense at the Bangkok Fight Lab.

He took up judo lessons at the age of 8, which helped build his foundation in mixed martial arts. Later on, he also developed a keen interest for Chinese martial arts, particularly baguazhang, which he would practice at Lumphini Park. Wiratchai has termed his own fighting style the "OneShin Striking System", which is based on "attacking opponents who leave themselves vulnerable". According to Wiratchai, the "OneShin Striking System" incorporates the basics of the striking arts he's learned. It also focuses on five core principles: balance, range, angle, rhythm and execution. "My main style is more like an unpredictable striking style," Wiratchai has said, elaborating on his style, "Then I refine my striking with more boxing knowledge. I think my most dangerous weapon may be my right hook. The thing that makes my right hook so strong is because I got no form. I'm just thinking about how to land my hand on the target: How I'm setting up, how I'm moving, how I find the angle, how I move to the goal." While mostly based on striking, this style also incorporates elements of judo and kung fu. When he turned pro in MMA, he later applied elements of Brazilian jiu-jitsu, Muay Thai, boxing and wrestling into his style. Outside of fundamental striking, Wiratchai mostly trains in Brazilian jiu-jitsu and wrestling, holding a black belt in judo and a blue belt in Brazilian jiu-jitsu.

=== OneShin Cup ===
On September 9, 2017, Shannon Wiratchai hosted the "OneShin Cup", an amateur mixed martial arts tournament. Wiratchai created the tournament with purpose of establishing more awareness surrounding the sport of MMA in Thailand, as well as developing Thai mixed martial artists so that they would be capable of competing at an international level. The event was streamed live on the Facebook page and YouTube channel of the Ignite Fight Club. The second edition of the OneShin Cup was held on May 5, 2018. The event was known for featuring future three-sport ONE Championship World Champion Stamp Fairtex.

=== Fighting Frenchie ===
On July 24, 2023, Wiratchai announced the release of his fight equipment brand Fighting Frenchie, which initially consisted of 7oz MMA sparring gloves. In September 27 of the same year, the brand would also release rashguards and shorts.

== Personal life ==
Unlike most Thai fighters, Shannon Wiratchai comes from a well-to-do background. His father is a doctor and his mother is a nurse, both of them working at the King Chulalongkorn Memorial Hospital. Wiratchai graduated from Chulalongkorn University Demonstration Secondary School. He then went on to complete his college education at Bangkok University. Wiratchai speaks Thai, English and Mandarin Chinese.

Until 2019, Shannon Wiratchai had been dating Tiger Muay Thai teammate and fellow mixed martial artist Rika Ishige, who competes in ONE Championship's atomweight division. The two have fought on the same card five times: ONE Championship: Warrior Kingdom on March 11, 2017 in Bangkok, ONE Championship: Kings and Conquerors on August 5, 2017 in Macau, ONE Championship: Warriors of the World on December 9, 2017 in Bangkok, ONE Championship: Iron Will on March 24, 2018 in Bangkok, and ONE Championship: Clash of Legends on February 16, 2019 in Bangkok. Wiratchai and Ishige have been referred to as "Thailand's martial arts power couple".

In 2020, he began dating American-Indonesian yoga instructor Fay Lee Thung. The two married on October 7, 2022.

== Titles & accomplishments ==
- NAKSU
  - 2010 NAKSU Amateur Tournament 75 kg Champion
- ONE Championship
  - Performance of the Night (One time)
  - 2nd-most knockouts in ONE Lightweight history (4)
  - 2nd-fastest knockout in ONE Lightweight history (0:21)

== Mixed martial arts record ==
Professional record breakdown
19 matches	11 wins	7 losses
By knockout	6	2
By submission	2	1
By decision	3	4
No contests	1	

Res.	Record	Opponent	Method	Event	Date	Round	Time	Location	Notes
Loss	11–7 (1)	Shin Dong-guk	TKO (submission to punches)	Island Fighters League 2	October 28, 2023	2	2:57	Bali, Indonesia	
Win	11–6 (1)	Puriya Golpour	TKO (punches and elbows)	ONE Friday Fights 3	February 3, 2023	1	4:33	Bangkok, Thailand	Performance of the Night.
Win	10–6 (1)	Fabio Pinca	Decision (split)	ONE: No Surrender 3	August 21, 2020	3	5:00	Bangkok, Thailand	
Loss	9–6 (1)	Honorio Banario	Decision (split)	ONE: King of the Jungle	February 28, 2020	3	5:00	Kallang, Singapore	Return to Lightweight.
Loss	9–5 (1)	Iuri Lapicus	Submission (rear-naked choke)	ONE: Enter the Dragon	May 17, 2019	3	3:10	Kallang, Singapore	
Loss	9–4 (1)	Amarsanaa Tsogookhuu	Decision (unanimous)	ONE: Clash of Legends	February 16, 2019	3	5:00	Bangkok, Thailand	
Loss	9–3 (1)	Shinya Aoki	TKO (elbows)	ONE: Reign of Kings	July 27, 2018	1	2:16	Pasay, Philippines	
Win	9–2 (1)	Rahul Raju	KO (punch)	ONE: Iron Will	March 24, 2018	1	0:21	Bangkok, Thailand	
Loss	8–2 (1)	Rasul Yakhyaev	Decision (unanimous)	ONE: Warriors of the World	December 9, 2017	3	5:00	Bangkok, Thailand	Welterweight debut.
Win	8–1 (1)	Rajinder Singh Meena	TKO (knee and punches)	ONE: Kings and Conquerors	August 5, 2017	1	0:29	Macau, SAR, China	
Win	7–1 (1)	Richard Corminal	KO (flying knee and punch)	ONE: Warrior Kingdom	March 11, 2017	1	3:37	Bangkok, Thailand	
Win	6–1 (1)	Peter Davis	TKO (knee and punches)	ONE: Unbreakable Warriors	September 2, 2016	2	3:32	Kuala Lumpur, Malaysia	Lightweight debut.
Win	5–1 (1)	Kyal Linn Aung	Submission (rear-naked choke)	ONE: Kingdom of Champions	May 27, 2016	1	2:17	Bangkok, Thailand	
Win	4–1 (1)	Amir Khan	Decision (split)	ONE: Warrior's Quest	May 22, 2015	3	5:00	Kallang, Singapore	
Win	3–1 (1)	Mitch Chilson	KO (soccer kicks and punches)	ONE FC: Total Domination	October 18, 2013	1	1:52	Kallang, Singapore	
Loss	2–1 (1)	Bashir Ahmad	Decision (unanimous)	ONE FC: Kings and Champions	April 5, 2013	3	5:00	Kallang, Singapore	
NC	2–0 (1)	Mitch Chilson	NC (illegal soccer kick)	ONE FC: Pride of a Nation	August 31, 2012	2	2:03	Quezon City, Philippines	Featherweight debut. Accidental illegal soccer kick rendered Chilson unable to continue.
Win	2–0	Tondamrong Panjabutra	Submission (rear-naked choke)	DARE 2/12	March 17, 2012	2	0:00	Bangkok, Thailand	Catchweight (149 lb) bout.
Win	1–0	D.K. Panjabutra	Decision (unanimous)	DARE 2/11	September 24, 2011	3	5:00	Bangkok, Thailand	

== See also ==
- List of male mixed martial artists
