= Jadamba Narantungalag =

Mongolian mixed martial arts fighter

- Born: 16 December 1975 (age 50); Bugat, Bulgan, Mongolian People's Republic
- Nationality: Mongolian
- Height: 170 cm (5 ft 7 in)
- Weight: 70 kg (154 lb; 11 st)
- Division: Lightweight; Featherweight
- Style: Judo, Karate, Kickboxing, Bökh, BJJ
- Fighting out of: Ulaanbaatar, Mongolia
- Team: Team Tungaa (2004–2019); Sengoku Training Players (2010–2011)
- Trainer: Arai Junichi
- Rank: 2nd dan black belt in Judo; Black belt in Kyokushin Karate; Purple belt in Brazilian Jiu-Jitsu
- Years active: 2004–2019

Kickboxing record
- Total: 10
- Wins: 4
- By knockout: 3
- Losses: 6
- By knockout: 1

Mixed martial arts record
- Total: 20
- Wins: 14
- By knockout: 3
- By submission: 5
- By decision: 6
- Losses: 6
- By knockout: 3
- By submission: 2
- By decision: 1

Other information
- Mixed martial arts record from Sherdog

Jadamba Narantungalag (born 16 December 1975) is a Mongolian former professional mixed martial artist, kickboxer and grappler who has fought for World Victory Road, K-1 MAX, Legend FC, Art of War Fighting Championship, and ONE Championship.

Narantungalag has fought the likes of Masato, Buakaw Banchamek, and Albert Kraus in K-1 kickboxing.

== Background ==
He first began Judo as a child, before moving to kyokushin as a teenager. He began training mixed martial arts, kickboxing, and Brazilian jiujitsu when he moved to Japan.

== Mixed martial arts career ==
Narantungalag had a slow start to his mixed martial arts career, losing his first two professional bouts to UFC veteran Norifumi Yamamoto in 2004, and Toshikazu Iseno in 2006, via KO and unanimous decision respectively. Following this though, he would go on a four fight winning streak, and also won the Mongolian MMA Championship Tournament in 2010, defeating both Burenzorig Batmunkh and Otgonbaatar Nergui via submission. After the impressive victories, Narantungalag signed with upstart promotion Sengoku Raiden Championship.

=== World Victory Road ===
After signing with the promotion, Narantungalag faced Pride FC and UFC veteran Akihiro Gono at WVR: Sengoku Raiden Championships 14 on August 22, 2010. He won the fight by unanimous decision.

In his second fight with the promotion, Narantungalag faced Kazunori Yokota at WVR: Soul of Fight in the promotion's final event on December 30, 2010. He won the fight via first-round knockout, bringing his winning streak to six in a row.

=== Legend Fighting Championship ===
Narantungalag faced Adrian Pang at Legend FC 6 on October 30, 2011, for the LFC Lightweight Championship. He won the fight via split decision.

In his first title defense within the promotion, Narantungalag faced Korean prospect Yui Chul Nam at Legend FC 8 on March 30, 2012. He successfully retained the championship, winning the fight via second round guillotine choke.

For his next fight in the promotion, Narantungalag faced Koji Ando at Legend FC 11 on April 27, 2013. He would lose the championship bout in the third round, after suffering a broken ankle.

=== ONE Championship ===
In April 2014, Narantungalag signed with Singapore based promotion ONE Championship. He made his debut against the former ONE Featherweight Champion, Honorio Banario at ONE FC: Honor and Glory on May 30, 2014. After three rounds, Narantungalag would win the fight via unanimous decision, handing Banario his third straight loss.

Narantungalag faced Koji Oishi for the ONE Featherweight Championship at ONE FC 19: Reign of Champions on August 29, 2014. He won the fight by unanimous decision to become the new ONE Featherweight champion.

Narantungalag was set to defend his title for the first time against Eric Kelly at ONE FC 23. ONE FC & Kelly's management team could not see eye-to-eye and the negotiations fell through. Narantungalag was then set to defend his title against the undefeated Russian Marat Gafurov at ONE FC 31 but visa trouble put a halt to that and Gafurov then fought Martin Nguyen for the interim ONE Featherweight Championship .

Narantungalag and Gafurov finally met at ONE FC 34 to unify the ONE Featherweight Championship. He lost via rear-naked choke in the fourth round.

In his first fight of 2016, Narantungalag was set to face former ONE Lightweight Champion Kotetsu Boku at ONE 42. He won via Von Flue choke in the third round.

He returned in July of the same year to KO Eric Kelly, before losing to Gafurov in their rematch in November.

Following a forced hiatus due to injury, Jadambaa returned in 2018 and picked up back-to-back victories over Edward Kelly and Kazuki Tokudome.

These victories earned him another shot at the ONE Featherweight Championship against Martin Nguyen at ONE: Roots of Honor. Jadambaa lost by first-round knockout via flying knee.

== Championships and accomplishments ==
- Fight Matrix
  - 2010 Most Lopsided Upset of The Year vs. Akihiro Gono on August 22
- Legend Fighting Championship
  - Legend FC Lightweight Championship (One time)
  - One successful title defense
- Mongolian MMA Championship
  - 2010 MGL Mongolian MMA Championship Tournament Winner
- ONE Championship
  - ONE Featherweight Championship (One time)

== Kickboxing record ==
Professional kickboxing record
4 Wins (3 (T)KO's), 6 Losses
Date	Result	Opponent	Event	Location	Method	Round	Time	Record
2009-06-27	Win	(Mongolia) U.Ganthmuru	MGL-1 70 kg Tournament Final	Ulaanbaatar, Mongolia	KO	1		4-6
Wins MGL-1 70kg Tournament title.
2009-06-27	Win	(Mongolia) D.Byanbadoruji	MGL-1 70 kg Tournament Semi Finals	Ulaanbaatar, Mongolia	KO	2		3-6
2009-06-27	Win	(Mongolia) B.Tosynthestugs	MGL-1 70 kg Tournament Quarter Finals	Ulaanbaatar, Mongolia	KO	2		2-6
2007-04-04	Loss	(Mongolia) Tsogto Amara	K-1 World MAX 2007 World Championship Final	Tokyo, Japan	Ext. R Decision (Unanimous)	4	3:00	1-6
2005-11-25	Loss	(Netherlands) Andy Souwer	Shootboxing: 20th Anniversary Series Final	Tokyo, Japan	Decision (Unanimous)	5	3:00	1-5
2005-07-20	Loss	(Thailand) Buakaw Por. Pramuk	K-1 World MAX 2005 Championship Final, Quarter Finals	Yokohama, Japan	Decision (Majority)	3	3:00	1-4
2005-05-04	Win	(Japan) Yasuhiro Kazuya	K-1 World MAX 2005 World Tournament Open	Tokyo, Japan	Decision (Majority)	3	3:00	1-3
2004-07-07	Loss	(Japan) Masato	K-1 World MAX 2004 World Tournament Final, Quarter Finals	Tokyo, Japan	Decision (Unanimous)	3	3:00	0-3
2004-04-07	Loss	(Netherlands) Albert Kraus	K-1 World MAX 2004 World Tournament Open	Tokyo, Japan	Ext.R Decision (Unanimous)	4	3:00	0-2
2003-11-03	Loss	(Japan) Tomo	New Japan Wrestling Championship-YOKOHAMA DEAD OUT	Yokohama, Japan	KO (Left Hook)	2	1:58	0-1

== Mixed martial arts record ==
Professional record breakdown
20 matches	14 wins	6 losses
By knockout	3	3
By submission	5	2
By decision	6	1

Res.	Record	Opponent	Method	Event	Date	Round	Time	Location	Notes
Loss	14–6	Martin Nguyen	KO (flying knee)	ONE: Roots of Honor	April 12, 2019	2	1:07	Pasay, Philippines	For the ONE Featherweight Championship (155 lb).
Win	14–5	Kazuki Tokudome	Decision (unanimous)	ONE: Pursuit of Power	July 13, 2018	3	5:00	Kuala Lumpur, Malaysia	
Win	13–5	Edward Kelly	TKO (punch)	ONE: Pinnacle of Power	June 23, 2018	2	4:58	Macau, SAR, China	
Loss	12–5	Marat Gafurov	Technical Submission (rear-naked choke)	ONE: Defending Honor	November 11, 2016	1	4:51	Kallang, Singapore	For the ONE Featherweight Championship.
Win	12–4	Eric Kelly	KO (punch)	ONE: Dynasty of Champions (Anhui)	July 2, 2016	1	0:44	Anhui, China	
Win	11–4	Kotetsu Boku	Technical Submission (shoulder choke)	ONE: Ascent To Power	May 6, 2016	3	1:27	Kallang, Singapore	
Loss	10–4	Marat Gafurov	Submission (rear-naked choke)	ONE: Dynasty of Champions (Beijing II)	November 21, 2015	4	4:39	Beijing, China	Lost the ONE Featherweight Championship.
Win	10–3	Koji Oishi	Decision (unanimous)	ONE FC: Reign of Champions	August 29, 2014	5	5:00	Dubai, United Arab Emirates	Won the ONE Featherweight Championship.
Win	9–3	Honorio Banario	Decision (unanimous)	ONE FC: Honor and Glory	May 30, 2014	3	5:00	Kallang, Singapore	
Loss	8–3	Koji Ando	TKO (ankle injury)	Legend FC 11	April 27, 2013	3	0:47	Kuala Lumpur, Malaysia	Lost the Legend FC Lightweight Championship.
Win	8–2	Yui Chul Nam	Submission (guillotine choke)	Legend FC 8	March 30, 2012	2	0:58	Hong Kong, SAR, China	Defended the Legend FC Lightweight Championship.
Win	7–2	Adrian Pang	Decision (split)	Legend FC 6	October 30, 2011	3	5:00	Macau, SAR, China	Won the Legend FC Lightweight Championship.
Win	6–2	Kazunori Yokota	KO (punch)	World Victory Road Presents: Soul of Fight	December 30, 2010	1	2:03	Tokyo, Japan	
Win	5–2	Akihiro Gono	Decision (unanimous)	World Victory Road Presents: Sengoku 14	August 22, 2010	3	5:00	Tokyo, Japan	
Win	4–2	Otgonbaatar Nergui	Submission (rear-naked choke)	MGL-1: 2010 Mongolian MMA Championship	March 12, 2010	1	3:57	Ulaanbaatar, Mongolia	
Win	3–2	Burenzorig Batmunkh	Submission (armbar)	MGL-1: 2010 Mongolian MMA Championship	March 12, 2010	1	4:19	Ulaanbaatar, Mongolia	
Win	2–2	Berneung Topkingboxing	Submission (armbar)	Art of War 13	July 18, 2009	1	2:28	Beijing, China	
Win	1–2	Wataru Miki	Decision (unanimous)	Imperial FC 1	September 19, 2007	3	5:00	Ulaanbaatar, Mongolia	
Loss	0–2	Toshikazu Iseno	Decision (unanimous)	Kokoro: Kill or be Killed	August 15, 2006	3	5:00	Tokyo, Japan	
Loss	0–1	Norifumi Yamamoto	KO (punch)	K-1 World MAX 2004 Champions' Challenge	October 13, 2004	1	1:55	Tokyo, Japan	

== See also ==
- List of male mixed martial artists
