= Evolve MMA =

Mixed martial arts training organization in Singapore

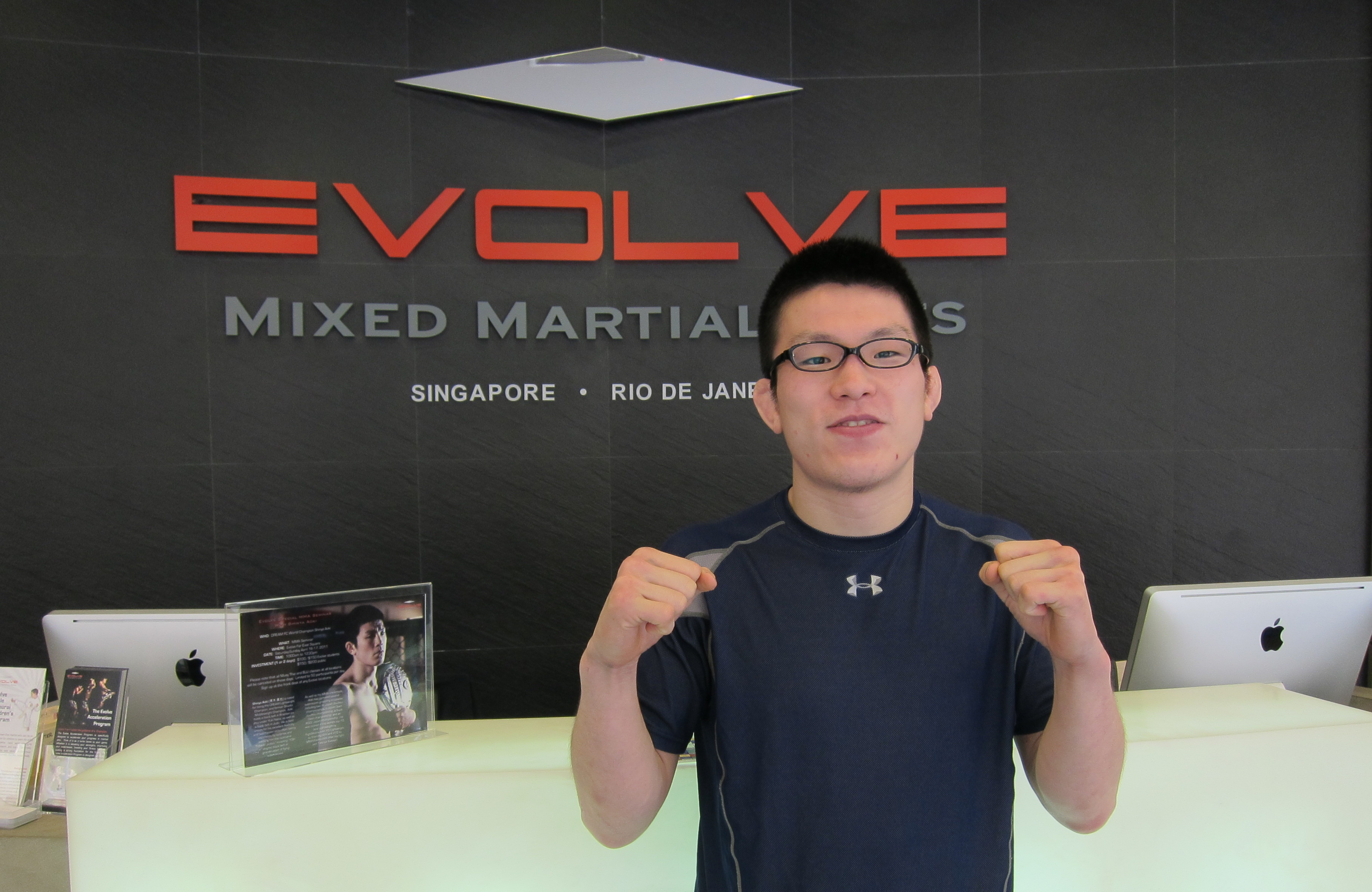
- Shinya Aoki at Evolve MMA, 2011
- Est.: 2009; 17 years ago
- Founded by: Chatri Sityodtong
- Training facilities: Singapore
- Website: Evolve-MMA.com

Evolve Mixed Martial Arts is a chain of martial arts academies in Singapore founded by Chatri Sityodtong in January 2009. The gym includes several former and reigning UFC and ONE Championship champions on its roster, including Demetrious Johnson, Rafael Dos Anjos, Shinya Aoki, Angela Lee and Marcus Almeida.

== Overview ==
Evolve has participants in Muay Thai, Brazilian jiu-jitsu, Mixed Martial Arts, Boxing, Wrestling and No-Gi Grappling. As of 2026, there are five Evolve MMA academies in Singapore: Evolve Far East Square, Evolve KINEX, Evolve Orchard Central, Evolve Clarke Quay and Evolve Star Vista. There is also Evolve University, an online university for martial arts. Evolve MMA is affiliated to Sityodtong Muay Thai.

== Evolve fight team ==
Several fighters coach, train and/or represent the Evolve Fight Team in organisations such as the Ultimate Fighting Championship and ONE Championship.

- Former ONE athlete Eddie Ng
- ONE Bantamweight World Champion Fabrício Andrade
- Former UFC Flyweight World Champion and former ONE Flyweight World Champion Demetrious Johnson
- Former UFC Lightweight World Champion Rafael Dos Anjos
- Former ONE Lightweight World Champion Shinya Aoki
- Former ONE Women's Atomweight World Champion Angela Lee
- ONE Women's Strawweight World Champion Xiong Jing Nan
- Former ONE Bantamweight Muay Thai World Champion Nong-O Gaiyanghadao
- Former ONE Light Heavyweight World Champion Roger Gracie
- ONE Lightweight and Welterweight World Champion Christian Lee
- Former ONE Bantamweight Kickboxing World Champion Hiroki Akimoto
- Marcus Almeida
- Former ONE Flyweight Submission Grappling World Champion Mikey Musumeci
- Former ONE Women's Atomweight Submission Grappling World Champion Danielle Kelly
- Garry Tonon
- Sage Northcutt
- Panpayak Jitmuangnon
- Rodlek P.K. Saenchaimuaythaigym
- Ritu Phogat

== See also ==
- List of professional MMA training camps
