= Yuya Wakamatsu =

Japanese mixed martial artist

- Born: February 9, 1995 (age 31); Satsumasendai, Japan
- Native name: 若松 佑弥
- Nickname: Little Piranha
- Height: 5 ft 6 in (1.68 m)
- Weight: 134 lb (61 kg; 9.6 st)
- Division: Flyweight; Bantamweight
- Reach: 68.0 in (173 cm)
- Fighting out of: Nerima, Japan
- Team: TRIBE TOKYO MMA
- Years active: 2015–present

Mixed martial arts record
- Total: 28
- Wins: 21
- By knockout: 15
- By decision: 6
- Losses: 7
- By knockout: 3
- By submission: 3
- By decision: 1

Other information
- Mixed martial arts record from Sherdog

Yuya Wakamatsu (若松佑弥, Wakamatsu Yuya; born February 9, 1995) is a Japanese mixed martial artist. He currently competes in the Flyweight division of ONE Championship, where he is the former ONE Flyweight World Champion.

== Mixed martial arts career ==
=== ONE Championship ===
In the ONE debut, Wakamatsu faced Danny Kingad on September 22, 2018, at ONE: Conquest of Heroes. He lost the fight via unanimous decision.

==== ONE Flyweight World Grand Prix ====
In the quarterfinal of the ONE Flyweight World Grand Prix, Wakamatsu faced Demetrious Johnson on March 31, 2019, at ONE: A New Era. He lost the fight via guillotine choke in round two.

Wakamatsu was scheduled to face Reece McLaren in a reserve bout on August 2, 2019, at ONE: Dawn of Heroes. However, McLaren replacing injured Kairat Akhmetov against Danny Kingad in a semifinal, and Wakamatsu faced Geje Eustaquio instead. He won the fight via first-round knockout.

==== Post Grand Prix ====
Wakamatsu faced Kim Dae-hwan on October 13, 2019, at ONE: Century – Part 1. He won the fight via unanimous decision.

Wakamatsu faced Kim Kyu-sung on October 30, 2020, and aired on November 6, 2020, at ONE: Inside the Matrix 2. He won the fight via first-round knockout.

Wakamatsu faced Reece McLaren on April 7, 2021, and aired on April 21, 2021, at ONE on TNT 3. He won the fight via unanimous decision.

Wakamatsu faced Hu Yong on December 3, 2021, at ONE: Winter Warriors. He won the fight via unanimous decision.

Wakamatsu faced Adriano Moraes for the ONE Flyweight World Championship on March 26, 2022, at ONE: X. He lost the fight via guillotine choke in round three.

Wakamatsu was scheduled to face Xie Wei on September 29, 2022, at ONE 161. However, Xie pulled out for unknown reasons and was replaced by Wang Shuo. At the weigh-ins, Wang weighed in at 139.5 pounds, 4.5 pounds over the flyweight limit. Subsequently, the bout was scrapped after Wang pulled out from the event.

Wakamatsu faced Woo Sung-hoon on November 19, 2022, at ONE 163. At the weigh-ins, Wakamatsu weighed in at 139 pounds, 4 pounds over the flyweight limit. The bout proceeded at catchweight with Wakamatsu being fined 40% of his purse, which went to Woo. He lost the fight via technical knockout in round one.

The bout between Wakamatsu and Xie was rescheduled on July 15, 2023, at ONE Fight Night 22. At the weigh-ins, Wakamatsu weighed in at 135.5 pounds, 0.5 pounds over the flyweight limit and Wakamatsu was fined their purse of his purse, which went to Xie. He won the fight via technical knockout in round one.

Wakamatsu faced Danny Kingad in a rematch on January 28, 2024, at ONE 165. He won the fight via unanimous decision.

Wakamatsu faced Gilbert Nakatani on December 7, 2024, at ONE Fight Night 26. He won the fight via unanimous decision.

==== ONE Flyweight World Champion ====
The rematch between Wakamatsu and Adriano Moraes for the vacant ONE Flyweight World Championship took place on March 23, 2025, at ONE 172. He won the title via technical knockout in round one and this win earned the $50,000 Performance of the Night bonuses.

== Championships and accomplishments ==
=== Mixed martial arts ===
- Pancrase
  - Pancrase Neo Blood Tournament Flyweight Winner (2016)
- ONE Championship
  - ONE Flyweight World Championship (One time; current)

== Mixed martial arts record ==
Professional record breakdown
28 matches	21 wins	7 losses
By knockout	15	3
By submission	0	3
By decision	6	1

Res.	Record	Opponent	Method	Event	Date	Round	Time	Location	Notes
Win	21–7	Willie van Rooyen	TKO (doctor stoppage)	ONE Samurai 3	September 12, 2026	2	4:34	Yokohama, Japan	
Loss	20–7	Avazbek Kholmirzaev	KO (spinning back elbow)	ONE Samurai 1	April 29, 2026	2	4:53	Tokyo, Japan	Lost the ONE Flyweight Championship (135 lb).
Win	20–6	Joshua Pacio	TKO (knees)	ONE 173	November 16, 2025	2	0:54	Tokyo, Japan	Defended the ONE Flyweight Championship (135 lb). Performance of the Night.
Win	19–6	Adriano Moraes	TKO (punches)	ONE 172	March 23, 2025	1	3:39	Saitama, Japan	Won the vacant ONE Flyweight Championship (135 lb). Performance of the Night.
Win	18–6	Gilbert Nakatani	Decision (unanimous)	ONE Fight Night 26	December 7, 2024	3	5:00	Bangkok, Thailand	
Win	17–6	Danny Kingad	Decision (unanimous)	ONE 165	January 28, 2024	3	5:00	Tokyo, Japan	
Win	16–6	Xie Wei	TKO (punches)	ONE Fight Night 12	July 15, 2023	1	2:03	Bangkok, Thailand	Catchweight (135.5 lb) bout; Wakamatsu missed weight.
Loss	15–6	Woo Sung-hoon	TKO (elbows and punches)	ONE 163	November 19, 2022	3	5:00	Kallang, Singapore	Catchweight (139 lb) bout; Wakamatsu missed weight.
Loss	15–5	Adriano Moraes	Submission (guillotine choke)	ONE: X	March 26, 2022	3	3:58	Kallang, Singapore	For the ONE Flyweight Championship (135 lb).
Win	15–4	Hu Yong	Decision (unanimous)	ONE: Winter Warriors	December 3, 2021	3	5:00	Kallang, Singapore	
Win	14–4	Reece McLaren	Decision (unanimous)	ONE on TNT 3	April 21, 2021	3	5:00	Kallang, Singapore	
Win	13–4	Kim Kyu-sung	KO (punch)	ONE: Inside the Matrix 2	November 6, 2020	1	1:46	Kallang, Singapore	
Win	12–4	Kim Dae-hwan	Decision (unanimous)	ONE: Century – Part 1	October 13, 2019	3	5:00	Tokyo, Japan	
Win	11–4	Geje Eustaquio	KO (punch)	ONE: Dawn of Heroes	August 2, 2019	1	1:59	Pasay, Philippines	ONE Flyweight World Grand Prix Reserve bout.
Loss	10–4	Demetrious Johnson	Submission (guillotine choke)	ONE: A New Era	March 31, 2019	2	2:40	Tokyo, Japan	ONE Flyweight World Grand Prix Quarterfinal.
Loss	10–3	Danny Kingad	Decision (unanimous)	ONE: Conquest of Heroes	September 22, 2018	3	5:00	Jakarta, Indonesia	Bantamweight debut.
Win	10–2	Mamoru Yamaguchi	Decision (unanimous)	Pancrase 297	July 1, 2018	2	0:39	Tokyo, Japan	
Loss	9–2	Senzo Ikeda	TKO (knees and elbows)	Pancrase 293	February 4, 2018	5	2:18	Tokyo, Japan	For the Pancrase Flyweight Championship.
Win	9–1	Shohei Masumizu	TKO (punches)	Pancrase 290	October 8, 2017	2	2:53	Tokyo, Japan	
Win	8–1	Takahiro Furumaki	KO (punch)	Pancrase 287	May 28, 2017	2	2:27	Tokyo, Japan	
Win	7–1	Yuki Uejima	TKO (punches)	Pancrase 285	March 12, 2017	1	2:49	Tokyo, Japan	
Win	6–1	Yusuke Ogikubo	Decision (split)	Pancrase 283	December 18, 2016	3	5:00	Tokyo, Japan	
Win	5–1	Kazuhisa Tanaka	KO (knee to the body)	Pancrase 280	September 11, 2016	1	2:06	Tokyo, Japan	Won the 22nd Pancrase Neo Blood Flyweight Tournament.
Win	4–1	Masayuki Watanabe	TKO (punches)	Pancrase 278	June 12, 2016	3	1:35	Tokyo, Japan	22nd Pancrase Neo Blood Flyweight Tournament Semifinal.
Win	3–1	Naoki Tanada	TKO (punches)	Pancrase 276	March 13, 2016	1	2:50	Tokyo, Japan	22nd Pancrase Neo Blood Flyweight Tournament Quarterfinal.
Win	2–1	Sadashi Hamamatsu	TKO (punches)	Pancrase 274	December 20, 2015	2	4:22	Kitakyushu, Japan	
Win	1–1	Yoshiya Shinba	KO (punches)	Fighting Network ZST: Challenge 148	March 28, 2014	1	2:37	Tokyo, Japan	
Loss	0–1	Yuto Sekiguchi	KO (punches)	Vale Tudo Japan in Osaka	June 21, 2015	1	2:43	Osaka, Japan	Flyweight debut.
