= Alex Silva (fighter) =

Brazilian mixed martial arts fighter (b. 1982)

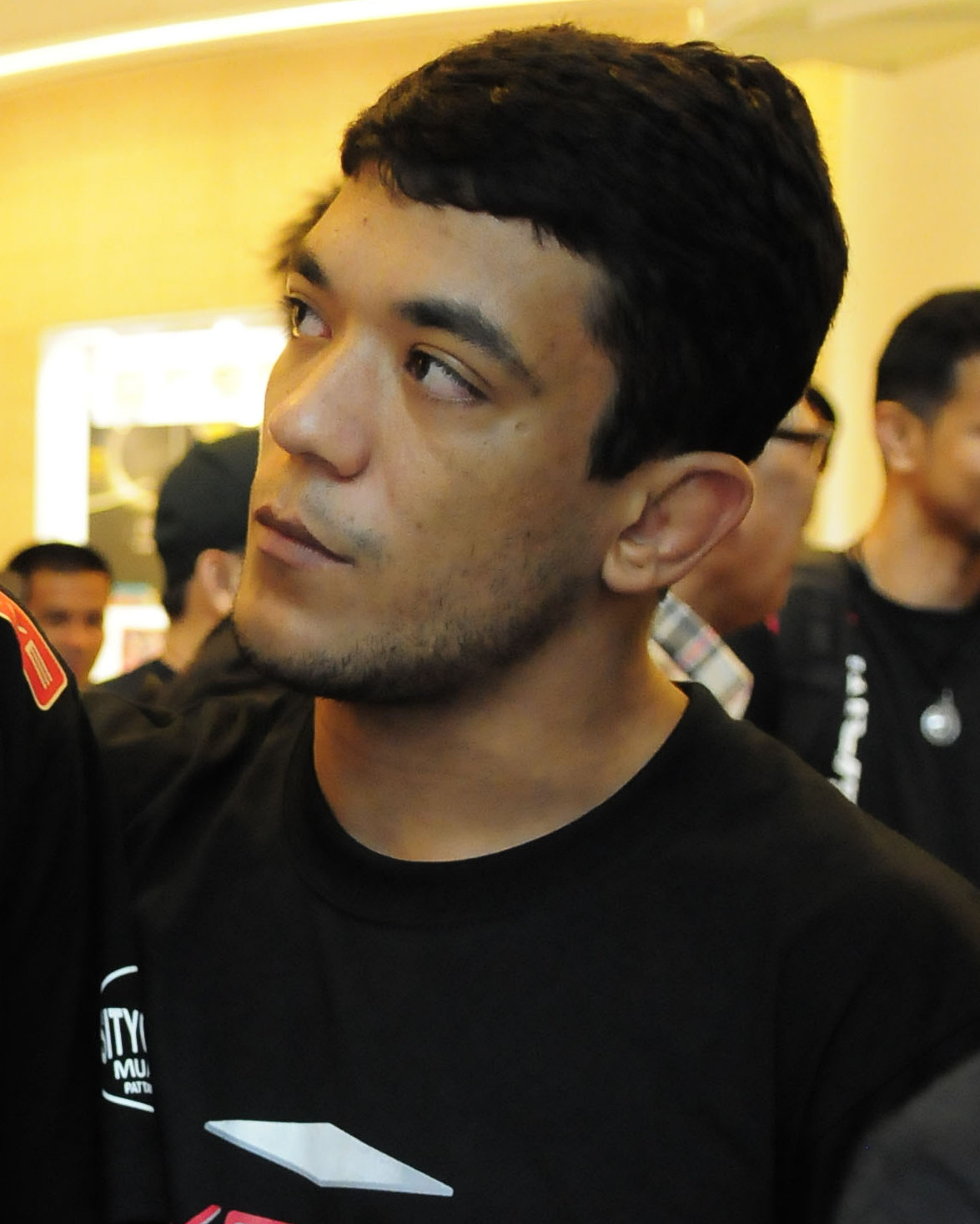
- Silva in 2011
- Born: October 10, 1982 (age 44); Ubatuba, São Paulo, Brazil
- Other names: Little Rock
- Height: 162 cm (5 ft 4 in)
- Weight: 125 lb (57 kg; 8 st 13 lb)
- Division: Strawweight; Flyweight
- Reach: 63.4 in (161 cm)
- Style: Brazilian jiu-jitsu
- Team: Evolve MMA
- Rank: 3rd degree Black Belt in Brazilian Jiu-jitsu
- Years active: 2011–2023

Mixed martial arts record
- Total: 21
- Wins: 12
- By submission: 10
- By decision: 2
- Losses: 9
- By knockout: 1
- By decision: 8

Other information
- Mixed martial arts record from Sherdog

Alex Silva (born October 10, 1982) is a Brazilian former mixed martial artist, who competed in the Strawweight division for the ONE Championship, he is a former ONE Strawweight World Champion.

== Mixed martial arts career ==
=== ONE Championship ===
Silva made his debut against Geje Eustaquio on February 11, 2012, at ONE FC: Battle of Heroes. He lost the bout via unanimous decision.

Silva faced Rene Catalan on April 5, 2013, at ONE FC: Kings and Champions. He won the fight via armbar submission in the first round.

Silva faced Ruel Catalan on December 11, 2015, at ONE: Spirit of Champions. He won the bout via kneebar submission in the first round.

Silva faced Robin Catalan on March 18, 2016, at ONE: Union of Warriors. He won the bout via arm-triangle choke submission in the first round.

Silva faced former ONE Strawweight World Championship challenger Roy Doliguez on February 11, 2017, at ONE: Throne of Tigers. He won the bout via armbar submission in the third round.

Silva faced Hayato Suzuki on November 10, 2017, at ONE: Legends of the World. He won the bout via armbar submission in the first round.

==== ONE Strawweight World Champion ====
Silva faced Yoshitaka Naito for the ONE Strawweight World Championship at ONE: Warriors of the World on December 9, 2017. He won the bout via unanimous decision and capture the ONE Strawweight World Championship.

Silva then faced Naito in a rematch on May 12, 2022, at ONE: Grit and Glory. He lost the bout and the title via split decision.

==== Post-championship reign ====
Silva faced Yosuke Saruta on December 7, 2018, at ONE: Destiny of Champions. He lost the fight via unanimous decision.

Silva faced Yoshitaka Naito in a third time on May 17, 2019, at ONE: Enter the Dragon. He lost the bout via unanimous decision.

Silva faced Stefer Rahardian on August 16, 2019, at ONE: Dreams of Gold. He won the fight via armbar submission in the second round.

Silva faced Peng Xue Wen on November 22, 2019, at ONE: Edge of Greatness. He won the fight via armbar submission in the second round.

Silva faced Joshua Pacio for the ONE Strawweight World Championship on January 31, 2020, at ONE: Fire & Fury. He lost the fight via split decision.

Silva faced Hiroba Minowa at ONE: Fists of Fury 3 on February 26, 2021, and aired on March 19, 2021. He lost the fight via split decision.

Silva faced Miao Li Tao at ONE: Battleground 2 on July 30, 2021, and aired on August 13, 2021. He won the fight via unanimous decision.

Silva faced Rene Catalan in a rematch at ONE: NextGen 3 on October 29, 2021, and aired on November 26, 2021. He won the fight via armbar submission in the first round.

Silva faced Adrian Mattheis on March 11, 2022, at ONE: Lights Out. He lost the fight via 5 second technical knockout in the second round. Though Silva protested referee Mohamed Sulaiman that he could still fight.

A rematch against Mattheis that took place on June 3, 2022, at ONE 158. He won the fight via heel hook submission in the first round. This win earned him the Performance of the Night award.

Silva faced Gustavo Balart on October 21, 2022, at ONE 162. At the weigh-ins, Balart failed the hydration test and was forced to take catchweight of 130.75 lbs, 5.75 lbs over the strawweight limit. He lost the fight via split decision.

Silva faced Keito Yamakita on March 25, 2023, at ONE Fight Night 8. He lost the fight via unanimous decision.

== Championships and accomplishments ==
=== Mixed martial arts ===
- ONE Championship
  - ONE Strawweight World Championship (One time)
  - Performance of the Night (One time) vs. Adrian Mattheis

== Mixed martial arts record ==
Professional record breakdown
21 matches	12 wins	9 losses
By knockout	0	1
By submission	10	0
By decision	2	8

Res.	Record	Opponent	Method	Event	Date	Round	Time	Location	Notes
Loss	12–9	Keito Yamakita	Decision (unanimous)	ONE Fight Night 8	March 25, 2023	3	5:00	Kallang, Singapore	
Loss	12–8	Gustavo Balart	Decision (split)	ONE 162	October 21, 2022	3	5:00	Kuala Lumpur, Malaysia	Catchweight (130.75 lb) bout; Balart missed weight.
Win	12–7	Adrian Mattheis	Submission (heel hook)	ONE 158	June 3, 2022	1	3:34	Kallang, Singapore	Performance of the Night.
Loss	11–7	Adrian Mattheis	TKO (punches)	ONE: Lights Out	March 11, 2022	2	0:05	Kallang, Singapore	
Win	11–6	Rene Catalan	Submission (armbar)	ONE: NextGen 3	November 26, 2021	1	3:35	Kallang, Singapore	
Win	10–6	Miao Li Tao	Decision (unanimous)	ONE: Battleground 2	August 13, 2021	3	5:00	Kallang, Singapore	
Loss	9–6	Hiroba Minowa	Decision (split)	ONE: Fists of Fury 3	March 19, 2021	1	1:41	Kallang, Singapore	
Loss	9–5	Joshua Pacio	Decision (split)	ONE: Fire & Fury	January 31, 2020	5	5:00	Pasay, Philippines	For the ONE Strawweight Championship (125 lb).
Win	9–4	Peng Xue Wen	Submission (armbar)	ONE: Edge of Greatness	November 22, 2019	2	4:45	Kallang, Singapore	
Win	8–4	Stefer Rahardian	Submission (armbar)	ONE: Dreams of Gold	August 16, 2019	2	4:55	Bangkok, Thailand	
Loss	7–4	Yoshitaka Naito	Decision (unanimous)	ONE: Enter the Dragon	May 17, 2019	3	5:00	Kallang, Singapore	
Loss	7–3	Yosuke Saruta	Decision (unanimous)	ONE: Destiny of Champions	December 7, 2018	3	5:00	Kuala Lumpur, Malaysia	
Loss	7–2	Yoshitaka Naito	Decision (split)	ONE: Grit and Glory	May 12, 2018	5	5:00	Jakarta, Indonesia	Lost the ONE Strawweight Championship (125 lb).
Win	7–1	Yoshitaka Naito	Decision (unanimous)	ONE: Warriors of the World	December 9, 2017	5	5:00	Bangkok, Thailand	Won the ONE Strawweight Championship.
Win	6–1	Hayato Suzuki	Submission (armbar)	ONE: Legends of the World	November 10, 2017	1	1:22	Pasay, Philippines	
Win	5–1	Roy Doliguez	Submission (armbar)	ONE: Throne of Tigers	February 10, 2017	3	2:36	Kuala Lumpur, Malaysia	
Win	4–1	Robin Catalan	Submission (arm-triangle choke)	ONE: Union of Warriors	March 18, 2016	1	4:25	Yangon, Myanmar	Strawweight bout.
Win	3–1	Ruel Catalan	Submission (kneebar)	ONE: Spirit of Champions	December 11, 2015	1	3:53	Pasay, Philippines	
Win	2–1	Rene Catalan	Submission (armbar)	ONE FC: Kings and Champions	April 5, 2013	1	4:54	Kallang, Singapore	
Loss	1–1	Geje Eustaquio	Decision (unanimous)	ONE FC: Battle of Heroes	February 11, 2012	3	5:00	Jakarta, Indonesia	
Win	1–0	Suchat Lukamkuha	Submission (rear-naked choke)	DARE 2/11	September 24, 2011	1	2:12	Bangkok, Thailand	Flyweight debut.
