= Danny Kingad =

Filipino mixed martial arts fighter

- Born: Danny Ittiw Kingad; September 28, 1995 (age 31); Sadanga, Philippines
- Other names: The King
- Nationality: Filipino
- Height: 5 ft 5 in (1.65 m)
- Weight: 135 lb (61 kg; 9 st 9 lb)
- Division: Flyweight; Bantamweight
- Reach: 56 in (142 cm)
- Style: Wushu
- Stance: Orthodox
- Fighting out of: Baguio, Philippines
- Team: Team Lakay (until 2023); Lions Nation MMA (2023–present)
- Years active: 2014–present

Mixed martial arts record
- Total: 21
- Wins: 15
- By knockout: 1
- By submission: 2
- By decision: 12
- Losses: 6
- By knockout: 1
- By submission: 2
- By decision: 3

Other information
- Mixed martial arts record from Sherdog

Medal record

Men's Kickboxing

Representing the Philippines

Southeast Asian Games
Bronze medal – third place	2023 Phnom Penh	60 kg Full contact

Danny Ittiw Kingad (born September 28, 1995) is a Filipino mixed martial artist, currently competes in the Flyweight division. He previously competed for ONE Championship where he was the ONE Flyweight World Grand Prix Tournament Runner-up.

== Background ==
Kingad was born on September 28, 1995, in Sadanga, Mountain Province, Philippines. He is of Igorot descent. After losing his father at the age of eight, Kingad began running with the wrong crowd that led him astray. He would drop out of school on multiple occasions and be found sleeping on the streets.

== Mixed martial arts career ==
=== ONE Championship ===
Kingad made his promotional debut against Muhamad Haidar on April 15, 2016, at ONE: Global Rivals. He won the fight via ground technical knockout in the first round.

Kingad faced Eugene Toquero on December 2, 2016, at ONE: Age of Domination. He won the fight via an armbar submission in the first round.

Kingad faced Muhammad Aiman on April 21, 2017, at ONE: Kings of Destiny. He won the fight via unanimous decision.

Kingad faced Adriano Moraes for the ONE Flyweight World Championship on November 10, 2017, at ONE: Legends of the World. He lost the fight via a rear-naked choke submission in the first round.

Kingad was scheduled to face Gianni Subba on March 9, 2018, at ONE: Visions of Victory. However, Subba replacing injured Adriano Moraes against Reece McLaren in the main-event and Kingad faced Sotir Kichukov. He won the fight via unanimous decision.

Kingad faced Ma Hao Bin on June 23, 2018, at ONE: Pinnacle of Power. He won the fight via unanimous decision.

Kingad faced Yuya Wakamatsu on September 22, 2018, at ONE: Conquest of Heroes. He won the fight via unanimous decision.

Kingad faced Tatsumitsu Wada on January 25, 2019, at ONE: Hero's Ascent. He won the fight via unanimous decision.

==== ONE Flyweight World Grand Prix ====
In the quarterfinals, Kingad was scheduled to face Andrew Leone on March 31, 2019, at ONE: A New Era. However, Leone withdrew from the bout due to an injured. He was replaced by Senzo Ikeda. He won the fight via unanimous decision.

In the semifinals, Kingad was scheduled to face Kairat Akhmetov on August 2, 2019, at ONE: Dawn of Heroes. However, Akhmetov forced to pull out due to undisclosed injury and was replaced by Reece McLaren. He won the fight via split decision.

In the final, Kingad faced Demetrious Johnson on October 13, 2019, at ONE: Century – Part 1. He lost the fight via unanimous decision.

==== Post-Grand Prix reign ====
Kingad faced Xie Wei on January 31, 2020, at ONE: Fire & Fury. He won the fight via unanimous decision.

Kingad was scheduled to face Kairat Akhmetov on December 4, 2020, at ONE: Big Bang. However, Kingad forced to withdraw due to cornermen tested positive for COVID-19. The pair was rescheduled on December 3, 2021, and aired on December 17, 2021, at ONE: Winter Warriors II. He lost the fight via unanimous decision.

Kingad was scheduled to face Gurdarshan Mangat on December 3, 2022, at ONE 164. However, Mangat withdrew due to undisclosed injury and the bout was scrapped.

Kingad faced Eko Roni Saputra on February 25, 2023, at ONE Fight Night 7. He won the fight via unanimous decision.

Kingad was scheduled to face Hu Yong on October 7, 2023, at ONE Fight Night 15. However, Kingad withdraw from the bout due to an ankle injury and was replaced by Eko Roni Saputra.

Kingad faced Yuya Wakamatsu in a rematch on January 28, 2024, at ONE 165. He lost the fight via unanimous decision.

Kingad faced Adriano Moraes in a rematch on November 9, 2024, at ONE 169. He lost the fight via guillotine choke in round two.

On May 14, 2026, it was announced that Kingad was released from ONE Championship.

== Championships and accomplishments ==
=== Mixed martial arts ===
- ONE Championship
  - ONE Flyweight World Grand Prix Tournament Runner-up

=== Kickboxing ===
- Southeast Asian Games
  - (bronze) 2023 Southeast Asian Games Men's Kickboxing Full Contact 60kg – Third place

== Mixed martial arts record ==
Professional record breakdown
21 matches	15 wins	6 losses
By knockout	1	1
By submission	2	2
By decision	12	3

Res.	Record	Opponent	Method	Event	Date	Round	Time	Location	Notes
Loss	15–6	Hu Yong	TKO (punches)	ONE Fight Night 40	February 14, 2026	1	4:50	Bangkok, Thailand	
Loss	15–5	Adriano Moraes	Submission (guillotine choke)	ONE 169	November 9, 2024	2	4:14	Bangkok, Thailand	
Loss	15–4	Yuya Wakamatsu	Decision (unanimous)	ONE 165	January 28, 2024	3	5:00	Tokyo, Japan	
Win	15–3	Eko Roni Saputra	Decision (unanimous)	ONE Fight Night 7	February 25, 2023	3	5:00	Bangkok, Thailand	
Loss	14–3	Kairat Akhmetov	Decision (unanimous)	ONE: Winter Warriors II	December 17, 2021	3	5:00	Kallang, Singapore	
Win	14–2	Xie Wei	Decision (unanimous)	ONE: Fire & Fury	January 31, 2020	3	5:00	Pasay, Philippines	
Loss	13–2	Demetrious Johnson	Decision (unanimous)	ONE: Century – Part 1	October 13, 2019	3	5:00	Tokyo, Japan	ONE Flyweight World Grand Prix Final.
Win	13–1	Reece McLaren	Decision (split)	ONE: Dawn of Heroes	August 2, 2019	3	5:00	Pasay, Philippines	ONE Flyweight World Grand Prix Semifinal.
Win	12–1	Senzo Ikeda	Decision (unanimous)	ONE: A New Era	March 31, 2019	3	5:00	Tokyo, Japan	ONE Flyweight World Grand Prix Quarterfinal.
Win	11–1	Tatsumitsu Wada	Decision (unanimous)	ONE: Hero's Ascent	January 25, 2019	3	5:00	Pasay, Philippines	
Win	10–1	Yuya Wakamatsu	Decision (unanimous)	ONE: Conquest of Heroes	September 22, 2018	3	5:00	Jakarta, Indonesia	
Win	9–1	Ma Hao Bin	Decision (unanimous)	ONE: Pinnacle of Power	June 23, 2018	3	5:00	Beijing, China	
Win	8–1	Sotir Kichukov	Decision (unanimous)	ONE: Visions of Victory	March 9, 2018	3	5:00	Kuala Lumpur, Malaysia	Bantamweight debut.
Loss	7–1	Adriano Moraes	Submission (rear-naked choke)	ONE: Legends of the World	November 10, 2017	1	4:45	Pasay, Philippines	For the ONE Flyweight Championship.
Win	7–0	Muhammad Aiman	Decision (unanimous)	ONE: Kings of Destiny	April 21, 2017	3	5:00	Pasay, Philippines	
Win	6–0	Eugene Toquero	Submission (armbar)	ONE: Age of Domination	December 2, 2016	1	4:36	Pasay, Philippines	
Win	5–0	Muhamad Haidar	TKO (punches)	ONE: Global Rivals	April 15, 2016	1	2:20	Pasay, Philippines	
Win	4–0	Raymond Doliguez	Decision (unanimous)	PXC Laban: Baguio 4	February 27, 2016	3	5:00	Baguio, Philippines	
Win	3–0	Robin Catalan	Submission (armbar)	PXC Laban: Baguio 3	October 18, 2015	2	4:21	Baguio, Philippines	
Win	2–0	Jiar Castillo	Decision (unanimous)	Spartacus Combat MMA: Fight Night	October 24, 2015	3	5:00	Manila, Philippines	
Win	1–0	Reymond Doliguez	Decision (unanimous)	Rock N' Rumble Year 2	November 20, 2014	3	5:00	Quezon City, Philippines	Flyweight debut.
