= Adriano Moraes (fighter) =

Brazilian mixed martial artist

- Born: Adriano da Silva Moraes; April 21, 1988 (age 38); Brasília, Federal District, Brazil
- Other names: Mikinho; Black Diamond
- Height: 5 ft 8 in (1.73 m)
- Weight: 135 lb (61 kg; 9 st 9 lb)
- Division: Flyweight (2011–present); Bantamweight (2013, 2018) (Note: ONE Championship refers to their 135 lb division as Flyweight, but per the Association of Boxing Commissions in the United States, 135 lbs is considered Bantamweight.)
- Reach: 69 in (175 cm)
- Style: Brazilian Jiu Jitsu
- Fighting out of: Coconut Creek, Florida, U.S.
- Team: Constrictor Team; American Top Team (2016–present)
- Rank: Black belt in Brazilian Jiu-Jitsu under Ataíde Junior
- Years active: 2011–present

Mixed martial arts record
- Total: 28
- Wins: 22
- By knockout: 4
- By submission: 12
- By decision: 6
- Losses: 6
- By knockout: 2
- By decision: 4

Other information
- Mixed martial arts record from Sherdog

Adriano da Silva Moraes (born April 21, 1988) is a Brazilian mixed martial artist who competes in the Flyweight division. A professional since 2011, he formerly competed in the flyweight division of ONE Championship, where he is the former, three-time, and inaugural ONE Flyweight MMA World Champion, along with being the interim ONE FC Flyweight World Champion in 2016, and Shooto Brasil, where he was the former flyweight champion.

== Background ==
Moraes was born in Brasilia, Brazil and abandoned by his mother days after birth. He was taken to an orphanage where he lived for three years before being adopted. He was an active child who partook in judo and capoeira. Wanting to learn how to better defend himself, Moraes took up Brazilian jiu-jitsu.

As a member of Constrictor Team, Moraes shined as a submission specialist. Moraes developed his skills and competed in jiu-jitsu tournaments before transitioning into MMA. He made his MMA debut in 2011. He would win the NAGA No-Gi Pro Division Championship in 2014 prior to earning his black belt.

== Mixed martial arts career ==
On September 4, 2011, Moraes made his professional mixed martial arts debut at Precol Combat 5 against Ismael Bonfim. Moraes won by first-round submission (guillotine choke). He would reel off six more victories before joining the longtime promotion Shooto in 2013.

=== ONE Championship ===
On November 15, 2013, Moraes made his ONE Championship debut at ONE FC: Warrior Spirit. He lost a split decision to Yusup Saadulaev.

==== First title reign ====
After back-to-back wins, Moraes met Geje Eustaquio for the vacant ONE Flyweight Championship. Moraes would capture his first world championship with a second-round guillotine choke on September 12, 2014 at ONE FC: Age of Champions.

Moraes would successfully defend the belt against Riku Shibuya on March 13, 2015 before dropping the title in a close split decision to Kairat Akhmetov on November 21, 2015 at ONE: Dynasty of Champions.

==== Second title reign ====
On August 13, 2016, Moraes captured gold once again as he became the interim ONE flyweight champion by defeating Tilek Batyrov via rear-naked choke at ONE: Heroes of the World.

On August 5, 2017, Moraes and Akhmetov fought in a flyweight unification bout. Moraes won the fight by unanimous decision and became the ONE flyweight championship undisputed champion.

On November 10, 2017, Moraes successfully defended the title against Danny Kingad at ONE: Legends of the World by rear-naked choke in the first round.

Moraes was scheduled to defend his title against Reece McLaren at ONE Championship: Visions of Victory on March 9, 2018. However, he suffered a knee injury and was forced to withdraw.

Moraes was set to make his second title defense against Geje Eustaquio at ONE Championship: Pinnacle of Power on June 23, 2018. He lost the fight and the title via split decision.

==== Third title reign ====
The pair met in a trilogy match at ONE Championship: Hero's Ascent on January 25, 2019. Moraes re-captured the championship via unanimous decision.

As the first bout of his new four-fight, two-year contract, Adriano Moraes was scheduled to defend his title against ONE Flyweight World Grand Prix Champion and former UFC Flyweight Champion Demetrious Johnson at ONE Championship: Reign of Dynasties on April 11, 2020. The fight was postponed due to the COVID-19 pandemic.

After being delayed, Moraes defended his title against Johnson at ONE on TNT 1 on April 7, 2021. The event was held at the Singapore Indoor Stadium in Kallang, Singapore and was broadcast on TNT during US prime time. Moraes won the bout via KO (knee) in round two. Due to Johnson being in a grounded position when he was hit, it would have counted as an illegal strike (and thus, would have resulted in a disqualification win for Johnson) if the fight had been held in the U.S.; however, the fight was held in Asia where such strikes are legal.

Moraes next defended his title against Yuya Wakamatsu at ONE: X on March 6, 2022. He won the fight via a guillotine choke submission in the third round.

Moraes made the third title defense of his third title reign against Demetrious Johnson at ONE on Prime Video 1 on August 27, 2022. He lost the fight and the title via KO due to a flying knee in the fourth round.

==== Post-championship ====
The trilogy bout between Moraes and Johnson for the ONE Flyweight World Championship was held on May 5, 2023, at ONE Fight Night 10. Moraes lost the bout by unanimous decision.

Moraes faced Danny Kingad in a rematch on November 9, 2024, at ONE 169. He won the fight via guillotine choke in round two.

Moraes faced Yuya Wakamatsu in a rematch, for the vacant ONE Flyweight World Championship on March 23, 2025, at ONE 172. He lost the fight via technical knockout in round one.

On March 2, 2026, it was announced that Moraes was no longer under contract with ONE Championship.

=== Most Valuable Promotions ===
Moraes was scheduled to face Muhammad Mokaev on May 16, 2026 at MVP MMA 1. However, Mokaev withdrew from the bout due to visa issues and was replaced by Phumi Nkuta. He won the fight via a last-second technical submission by rear-naked choke in the third round. Referee Herb Dean's decision proved controversial, with some alleging that Nkuta was not unconscious before the bell and that Moraes illegally held onto the submission after the end. Nkuta argued that the decision deprived him of the chance to win by decision and filed an appeal with the California State Athletic Commission, though the appeal was denied due to lack of definitive evidence.

== Championships and accomplishments ==
- ONE Championship
  - ONE Flyweight Championship (Three times)
    - Four successful title defenses (overall)
    - One successful title defense (first reign)
    - One successful title defense (second reign)
    - Two successful title defense (third reign)
  - Interim ONE Flyweight Championship (One time)
  - MMA Knockout of the Year 2021 vs. Demetrious Johnson
- Shooto
  - Shooto Brazil Flyweight Championship
- World MMA Awards
  - 2021 Upset of the Year vs. Demetrious Johnson at ONE on TNT 1

== Mixed martial arts record ==
Professional record breakdown
28 matches	22 wins	6 losses
By knockout	4	2
By submission	12	0
By decision	6	4

Res.	Record	Opponent	Method	Event	Date	Round	Time	Location	Notes
Win	22–6	Phumi Nkuta	Technical Submission (rear-naked choke)	MVP MMA: Rousey vs. Carano	May 16, 2026	3	4:59	Inglewood, California, United States	Catchweight (130 lb) bout. Fight of the Night.
Loss	21–6	Yuya Wakamatsu	TKO (punches)	ONE 172	March 23, 2025	1	3:39	Saitama, Japan	For the vacant ONE Flyweight Championship (135 lb).
Win	21–5	Danny Kingad	Submission (guillotine choke)	ONE 169	November 9, 2024	2	4:14	Bangkok, Thailand	
Loss	20–5	Demetrious Johnson	Decision (unanimous)	ONE Fight Night 10	May 5, 2023	5	5:00	Broomfield, Colorado, United States	For the ONE Flyweight Championship (135 lb).
Loss	20–4	Demetrious Johnson	KO (flying knee)	ONE on Prime Video 1	August 27, 2022	4	3:50	Kallang, Singapore	Lost the ONE Flyweight Championship (135 lb).
Win	20–3	Yuya Wakamatsu	Submission (guillotine choke)	ONE: X	March 26, 2022	3	3:58	Kallang, Singapore	Defended the ONE Flyweight Championship (135 lb).
Win	19–3	Demetrious Johnson	KO (knee)	ONE on TNT 1	April 7, 2021	2	2:24	Kallang, Singapore	Defended the ONE Flyweight Championship (135 lb).
Win	18–3	Geje Eustaquio	Decision (unanimous)	ONE: Hero's Ascent	January 25, 2019	5	5:00	Pasay, Philippines	Won the ONE Flyweight Championship (135 lb).
Loss	17–3	Geje Eustaquio	Decision (split)	ONE: Pinnacle of Power	June 23, 2018	5	5:00	Macau, SAR, China	Lost the ONE Flyweight Championship (135 lb).
Win	17–2	Danny Kingad	Submission (rear naked choke)	ONE: Legends of the World	November 10, 2017	1	4:45	Pasay, Philippines	Defended the ONE Flyweight Championship (135 lb).
Win	16–2	Kairat Akhmetov	Decision (unanimous)	ONE: Kings & Conquerors	August 5, 2017	5	5:00	Macau, SAR, China	Won and unified the ONE Flyweight Championship (135 lb).
Win	15–2	Tilek Batyrov	Submission (rear-naked choke)	ONE: Heroes of the World	August 13, 2016	2	4:49	Macau, SAR, China	Won the interim ONE Flyweight Championship (135 lb).
Win	14–2	Eugene Toquero	Submission (brabo choke)	ONE: Union of Warriors	March 18, 2016	1	4:53	Yangon, Myanmar	Return to Bantamweight.
Loss	13–2	Kairat Akhmetov	Decision (split)	ONE: Dynasty of Champions 4	November 21, 2015	5	5:00	Beijing, China	Lost the ONE Flyweight Championship.
Win	13–1	Riku Shibuya	Decision (unanimous)	ONE: Age of Champions	March 13, 2015	5	5:00	Kuala Lumpur, Malaysia	Defended the ONE Flyweight Championship.
Win	12–1	Geje Eustaquio	Submission (guillotine choke)	ONE FC: Rise of the Kingdom	September 12, 2014	2	3:45	Phnom Penh, Cambodia	Won the inaugural ONE Flyweight Championship.
Win	11–1	Kosuke Suzuki	Submission (arm-triangle choke)	ONE FC: Era of Champions	June 14, 2014	3	1:35	Jakarta, Indonesia	
Win	10–1	Yasuhiro Urushitani	Submission (rear-naked choke)	ONE FC: War of Nations	March 14, 2014	2	3:48	Kuala Lumpur, Malaysia	
Loss	9–1	Yusup Saadulaev	Decision (split)	ONE FC: Warrior Spirit	November 15, 2013	5	5:00	Kuala Lumpur, Malaysia	Bantamweight bout.
Win	9–0	Dileno Lopes	TKO (body kick)	Shooto Brazil 40	June 23, 2013	3	1:00	Manaus, Brazil	Won vacant Shooto Brazil Flyweight Championship.
Win	8–0	José Marcos Júnior	Decision (unanimous)	Shooto Brazil 39	May 17, 2013	3	5:00	Brasília, Brazil	
Win	7–0	Carlos Sousa Almeida	Submission (rear-naked choke)	Octagon Rounds Fight 2	April 13, 2013	2	2:20	Palmas, Brazil	
Win	6–0	Aldo Ariel Villalba	Submission (arm-triangle choke)	Pro Mix Fight 7	March 9, 2013	1	1:30	Campo Grande, Brazil	
Win	5–0	Michael William Costa	Decision (unanimous)	Shooto Brazil 34	September 21, 2012	3	5:00	Brasília, Brazil	
Win	4–0	Leonardo Moura	Decision (unanimous)	Encontro Fight 2	July 27, 2012	3	5:00	São Paulo, Brazil	
Win	3–0	Jhon Leno	KO (knee)	Rockstrike MMA	May 26, 2012	1	N/A	Brasília, Brazil	
Win	2–0	James Carvalho	TKO (elbows)	Precol Combat 7	May 5, 2012	1	1:55	Unaí, Brazil	
Win	1–0	Ismael Bonfim	Submission (guillotine choke)	Precol Combat 5	September 4, 2011	1	2:55	Unaí, Brazil	Flyweight debut.

== See also ==
- List of current mixed martial arts champions
- List of male mixed martial artists
