= ONE: Winter Warriors II =

Combat sport events in 2021

- The poster for ONE: Winter Warriors II
- Promotion: ONE Championship
- Date: December 3, 2021 (aired December 17, 2021)
- Venue: Singapore Indoor Stadium
- City: Kallang, Singapore

Event chronology
ONE: Winter Warriors	ONE: Winter Warriors II	ONE: Heavy Hitters

ONE: Winter Warriors II (also known as ONE 149: Philippines vs. the World) was a Combat sport event produced by ONE Championship that took place on December 3, 2021 and aired on December 17, 2021, at the Singapore Indoor Stadium in Kallang, Singapore.

== Background ==
The event was headlined by a flyweight bout between former ONE Flyweight World Champion Kairat Akhmetov and Danny Kingad.

A bantamweight bout between Kwon Won Il and former ONE Bantamweight Champion Kevin Belingon served as the co-main event.

Former ONE Middleweight World Champion Vitaly Bigdash and Fan Rong took place at a catchweight of 209 pounds.

== Results ==
Main Card (YouTube/ONE Super App)
Weight class				Method	Round	Time	Notes
Flyweight	Kairat Akhmetov	def.	Danny Kingad	Decision (unanimous)	3	5:00
Bantamweight	Kwon Won Il	def.	Kevin Belingon	KO (punch to the body)	2	0:52
Catchweight (209 lbs)	Vitaly Bigdash	def.	Fan Rong	Submission (guillotine choke)	3	0:41
Welterweight	Murad Ramazanov	def.	Zebaztian Kadestam	Decision (unanimous)	3	5:00
Bantamweight	Stephen Loman	def.	Yusup Saadulaev	TKO (punches)	1	4:09
Bantamweight	Jhanlo Mark Sangiao	def.	Paul Lumihi	Submission (rear-naked choke)	1	1:41
Lead Card (Facebook/YouTube/ONE Super App)
Lightweight Kickboxing	Arian Sadiković	def.	Mustapha Haida	Decision (unanimous)	3	3:00
Bantamweight	Fabrício Andrade	def.	Li Kai Wen	TKO (punches)	1	4:41
Catchweight (127.5 lbs) Muay Thai	Joseph Lasiri	def.	Asahi Shinagawa	KO (punch and knee)	1	2:05	(Note: Shinagawa missed weight (127.5 lbs).)

== See also ==
- 2021 in ONE Championship
- List of ONE Championship events
- List of current ONE fighters
