= 2017 in ONE Championship =

Mixed martial arts events

Information
- First date: January 14, 2017

Events
- Total events: 14

Fights
- Title fights: 13

Chronology
2016 in ONE	2017 in ONE Championship	2018 in ONE

The year 2017 was the 7th year in the history of the ONE Championship, a mixed martial arts promotion based in Singapore.

== List of events ==
ONE Championship
#	Event title	Date	Arena	Location
1	ONE Championship: Quest for Power	January 14, 2017	Jakarta Convention Center	Jakarta, Indonesia
2	ONE Championship: Throne of Tigers	February 10, 2017	Stadium Negara	Kuala Lumpur, Malaysia
3	ONE Championship: Warrior Kingdom	March 11, 2017	IMPACT Arena	Bangkok, Thailand
4	ONE Championship: Kings of Destiny	April 21, 2017	Mall of Asia Arena	Manila, Philippines
5	ONE Championship: Dynasty of Heroes	May 26, 2017	Singapore Indoor Stadium	Kallang, Singapore
6	ONE Championship: Light of a Nation	June 30, 2017	Thuwunna National Indoor Stadium	Yangon, Myanmar
—	ONE Championship: Conquest of Kings (cancelled)	July 29, 2017	GOR Kertajaya	Surabaya, Indonesia
7	ONE Championship: Kings and Conquerors	August 5, 2017	Cotai Arena	Macau, China
8	ONE Championship: Quest for Greatness	August 18, 2017	Stadium Negara	Kuala Lumpur, Malaysia
9	ONE Championship: Shanghai	September 2, 2017	Shanghai Oriental Sports Center	Shanghai, China
10	ONE Championship: Total Victory	September 16, 2017	Jakarta Convention Center	Jakarta, Indonesia
11	ONE Championship: Hero's Dream	November 3, 2017	Harbin International Convention Exhibition and Sports Center	Yangon, Myanmar
12	ONE Championship: Legends of the World	November 10, 2017	Mall of Asia Arena	Manila, Philippines
13	ONE Championship: Immortal Pursuit	November 24, 2017	Singapore Indoor Stadium	Kallang, Singapore
14	ONE Championship: Warriors of the World	December 9, 2017	IMPACT Arena	Bangkok, Thailand

== Tournament bracket ==
=== Myanmar Flyweight Tournament ===
==== ONE Myanmar Flyweight Tournament bracket ====
Semi-finals
(Myanmar) Saw Min Min	KO
(Myanmar) Kyar Ba Hein	1r.
(Myanmar) Ye Thway Ne	UD
(Myanmar) Pat Kyaw Lin Naing	3r.

Final
(Myanmar) Saw Min Min	SUB
(Myanmar) Shwe Kyaung Thar^{1}	1r.

^{1}Ye Thway Ne could not participate in the finals of the tournament. He was subsequently replaced by Shwe Kyaung Thar.

== Title fights ==
Title fights in 2017
Weight class				Method	Round	Time	Event	Notes
Middleweight	Vitaly Bigdash (c)	def.	Aung La Nsang	Decision (unanimous)	5	5:00	ONE: Quest for Power	(Note: For the ONE Middleweight World Championship.)
Women's Atomweight	Angela Lee (c)	def.	Jenny Huang	TKO (punches)	3	3:37	ONE: Warrior Kingdom	(Note: For the ONE Women's Atomweight World Championship.)
Lightweight	Eduard Folayang (c)	def.	Ev Ting	Decision (unanimous)	5	5:00	ONE: Kings of Destiny	(Note: For the ONE Lightweight World Championship.)
Welterweight	Ben Askren (c)	def.	Agilan Thani	Submission (arm-triangle choke)	1	2:20	ONE: Dynasty of Heroes	(Note: For the ONE Welterweight World Championship.)
Women's Atomweight	Angela Lee (c)	def.	Istela Nunes	Submission (anaconda choke)	2	2:18	ONE: Dynasty of Heroes	(Note: For the ONE Women's Atomweight World Championship.)
Middleweight	Aung La Nsang	def.	Vitaly Bigdash (c)	Decision (unanimous)	5	5:00	ONE: Light of a Nation	(Note: For the ONE Middleweight World Championship.)
Flyweight	Adriano Moraes (ic)	def.	Kairat Akhmetov (c)	Decision (unanimous)	5	5:00	ONE: Kings and Conquerors	(Note: For the ONE Flyweight World Championship.)
Bantamweight	Bibiano Fernandes (c)	def.	Andrew Leone	Submission (rear-naked choke)	1	1:47	ONE: Kings and Conquerors	(Note: For the ONE Bantamweight World Championship.)
Featherweight	Martin Nguyen	def.	Marat Gafurov (c)	KO (punch)	2	1:27	ONE: Quest for Greatness	(Note: For the ONE Featherweight World Championship.)
Welterweight	Ben Askren (c)	def.	Zebaztian Kadestam	TKO (punches)	2	4:09	ONE: Shanghai	(Note: For the ONE Welterweight World Championship.)
Flyweight	Adriano Moraes (c)	def.	Danny Kingad	Submission (rear-naked choke)	1	4:45	ONE: Legends of the World	(Note: For the ONE Flyweight World Championship.)
Lightweight	Martin Nguyen	def.	Eduard Folayang (c)	KO (punch)	2	2:20	ONE: Legends of the World	(Note: For the ONE Lightweight World Championship.)
Welterweight	Ben Askren (c)	def.	Shinya Aoki	TKO (punches)	1	0:57	ONE: Immortal Pursuit	(Note: For the ONE Welterweight World Championship.)
Strawweight	Alex Silva	def.	Yoshitaka Naito (c)	Decision (unanimous)	5	5:00	ONE: Warriors of the World	(Note: For the ONE Strawweight World Championship.)

== ONE Championship: Quest for Power ==
ONE: Quest for Power
- Promotion: ONE Championship
- Date: January 14, 2017
- Venue: Jakarta Convention Center
- City: Jakarta, Indonesia

Event chronology
ONE: Quest for Power	ONE: Throne of Tigers

ONE Championship: Quest for Power (also known as ONE Championship 50) was a mixed martial arts event held by ONE Championship on January 14, 2017 at the Jakarta Convention Center in Jakarta, Indonesia.

=== Background ===
This event featured a world title fight for the ONE Middleweight Championship Vitaly Bigdash of Russia makes the first defense of his title against top contender Aung La Nsang of Myanmar as ONE Championship: Quest for Power headliner.

The co-main event featured a lightweight bout between top contender Martin Nguyen and Kazunori Yokota.

The card was originally headlined by a middleweight title fight between champion Vitaly Bigdash and Marcin Prachnio. However, it was announced Prachnio had to withdraw due to an injury he sustained during his training camp and Bigdash instead faced Aung La Nsang.

=== Results ===
ONE Championship: Quest for Power
Weight Class				Method	Round	Time	Notes
Middleweight 84 kg	(Russia) Vitaly Bigdash	def.	(Myanmar) Aung La Nsang	Decision (Unanimous)	5	5:00	For the ONE Middleweight Championship
Featherweight 66 kg	(Australia) Martin Nguyen	def.	(Japan) Kazunori Yokota	TKO (Punches)	1	3:36	
Lightweight 70 kg	(Netherlands) Vincent Latoel	def.	(Philippines) Vaughn Donayre	Decision (Unanimous)	3	5:00	
Lightweight 70 kg	(Bulgaria) Georgi Stoyanov	def.	(Turkey) Saygid Guseyn Arslanaliev	DQ (Illegal Kick)	1	1:28	
Featherweight 66 kg	(Netherlands) Anthony Engelen	def.	(Malaysia) AJ Lias Mansor	KO (Punches)	1	1:42	
Light Heavyweight 93 kg	(Ukraine) Igor Subora	def.	(Egypt) Sherif Mohamed	Decision (Unanimous)	3	5:00	
Preliminary Card
Featherweight 66 kg	(Indonesia) Sunoto Peringkat	def.	(Cambodia) Chan Heng	TKO (Punches)	1	2:30	
Bantamweight 61 kg	(Indonesia) Stefer Rahardian	def.	(Liberia) Jerome S. Paye	Decision (Unanimous)	3	5:00	
Flyweight 57 kg	(Philippines) Rene Catalan	def.	(Indonesia) Adrian Matheis	Submission (Armbar)	2	2:08	

== ONE Championship: Throne of Tigers ==
ONE: Throne of Tigers
- Promotion: ONE Championship
- Date: February 14, 2017
- Venue: Stadium Negara
- City: Kuala Lumpur, Malaysia

Event chronology
ONE: Quest for Power	ONE: Throne of Tigers	ONE: Warrior Kingdom

ONE Championship: Throne of Tigers (also known as ONE Championship 51) was a mixed martial arts event held by ONE Championship on February 14, 2017 at the Stadium Negara in Kuala Lumpur, Malaysia.

=== Results ===
ONE Championship: Throne of Tigers
Weight Class				Method	Round	Time	Notes
Lightweight 70 kg	(Malaysia) Ev Ting	def.	(Iran) Kamal Shalorus	Decision (Split)	3	5:00	
Welterweight 77 kg	(Malaysia) Agilan Thani	def.	(Taiwan) Jeff Huang	Submission (Rear Naked Choke)	2	2:25	
Women's Flyweight 57 kg	(Malaysia) Ann Osman	def.	(Cambodia) Vy Srey Khouch	TKO (Punches)	1	4:58	
Featherweight 66 kg	(Russia) Movlid Khaybulaev	def.	(Brazil) Herbert Burns	Decision (Unanimous)	3	5:00	
Featherweight 66 kg	(Malaysia) Keanu Subba	def.	(Pakistan) Ahmed Mujtaba	Submission (Guillotine Choke)	1	2:56	
Flyweight 57 kg	(Brazil) Alex Silva	def.	(Philippines) Roy Doliguez	Submission (Armbar)	3	2:36	
Flyweight 57 kg	(Malaysia) Saiful Merican	def.	(Philippines) Bernard Soriano	TKO (Retirement)	1	5:00	
Preliminary Card
Women's Flyweight 57 kg	(Singapore) Tiffany Teo	def.	(Indonesia) Priscilla Hertati Lumban Gaol	Decision (Unanimous)	3	5:00	
Featherweight 66 kg	(Malaysia) Muhammad Aiman	def.	(Brazil) Eduardo Novaes	TKO (Punches)	2	2:50	

== ONE Championship: Warrior Kingdom ==
ONE: Warrior Kingdom
- Promotion: ONE Championship
- Date: March 11, 2017
- Venue: IMPACT Arena
- City: Bangkok, Thailand

Event chronology
ONE: Throne of Tigers	ONE: Warrior Kingdom	ONE: Kings of Destiny

ONE Championship: Warrior Kingdom (also known as ONE Championship 52) was a mixed martial arts event held by ONE Championship on March 11, 2017 at the IMPACT Arena in Bangkok, Thailand.

=== Background ===
This event featured a world title fight for the ONE Women's Atomweight Championship Angela Lee of Singapore makes the first defense of her title against top contender Jenny Huang of Taiwan as ONE Championship: Warrior Kingdom headliner. The co-main event featured a lightweight bout between Shannon Wiratchai of Bangkok and Richard Corminal.

In addition MMA action, two of the country's most popular musical acts, Thaitanium and Slot Machine, had performing live at the event.

=== Results ===
ONE Championship: Warrior Kingdom
Weight Class				Method	Round	Time	Notes
Women's Atomweight 52 kg	(Canada) Angela Lee (c)	def.	(Taiwan) Jenny Huang	TKO (Punches)	3	3:37	For the ONE Women's Atomweight Championship
Lightweight 70 kg	(Thailand) Shannon Wiratchai	def.	(Philippines) Richard Corminal	KO (Punch)	1	3:37	
Strawweight 52 kg	(Philippines) Joshua Pacio	def.	(Thailand) Dejdamrong Sor Amnuaysirichoke	Decision (Split)	3	5:00	
Bantamweight 61 kg	(Thailand) Yodsanan Sityodtong	def.	(Philippines) Ramon Gonzalez	TKO (Punches)	2	3:21	
Women's Atomweight 47 kg	(Thailand) Rika Ishige	def.	(Malaysia) Audreylaura Boniface	TKO (Punches)	1	4:32	
Featherweight 66 kg	(Thailand) Sagetdao Petpayathai	def.	(Malaysia) Kelvin Ong	TKO (Knees and Punches)	1	2:20	
Featherweight 66 kg	(China) Jia Wen Ma	def.	(Malaysia) Yohan Mulia Legowo	TKO (Punches)	2	0:52	
Preliminary Card
Strawweight 52 kg	(Thailand) Kritsada Kongsrichai	def.	(Indonesia) Adrian Matheis	TKO (Punches)	1	2:51	
Strawweight 52 kg	(Thailand) Pongsiri Mitsatit	def.	(Philippines) Rabin Catalan	TKO (Punches)	1	4:45	

== ONE Championship: Kings of Destiny ==
ONE: Kings of Destiny
- Promotion: ONE Championship
- Date: April 21, 2017
- Venue: Mall of Asia Arena
- City: Manila, Philippines

Event chronology
ONE: Warrior Kingdom	ONE: Kings of Destiny	ONE: Dynasty of Heroes

ONE Championship: Kings of Destiny (also known as ONE Championship 53) was a mixed martial arts event held by ONE Championship on April 21, 2017 at the Mall of Asia Arena in Manila, Philippines.

=== Background ===
This event featured a world title fight for the ONE Women's Atomweight Championship. Eduard Folayang of the Philippines made the first defense of his title against top contender Ev Ting of Malaysia as ONE Championship: Kings of Destiny headliner.

Rob Lisita has pulled out of the bout against Honorio Banario for personal reasons and was replaced by Jaroslav Jartim of Czech Republic. A featherweight bout between top featherweight prospect Christian Lee of Singapore and Keanu Subba was originally scheduled for this card, but Keanu Subba suffered an injury during training camp. Lee instead faced Jian Ping Wan.

=== Results ===
ONE Championship: Kings of Destiny
Weight Class				Method	Round	Time	Notes
Lightweight 70 kg	(Philippines) Eduard Folayang(c)	def.	(Malaysia) Ev Ting	Decision (Unanimous)	3	5:00	For the ONE Lightweight Championship
Bantamweight 61 kg	(Philippines) Kevin Belingon	def.	(Finland) Toni Tauru	TKO (Punches)	1	2:27	
Lightweight 70 kg	(Philippines) Honorio Banario	def.	(Czech Republic) Jaroslav Jartim	KO (Punch)	2	1:31	
Featherweight 66 kg	(Canada) Christian Lee	def.	(China) Jian Ping Wan	TKO (Punches)	1	4:15	
Flyweight 57 kg	(Philippines) Danny Kingad	def.	(Malaysia) Muhammad Aiman	Decision (Unanimous)	3	5:00	
Flyweight 57 kg	(Indonesia) Stefer Rahardian	def.	(Philippines) Eugene Toquero	Decision (Unanimous)	3	5:00	
Bantamweight 61 kg	(China) Xie Bin	def.	(Cambodia) Chan Rothana	Submission (Guillotine Choke)	2	1:46	
Preliminary Card
Women's Strawweight 52 kg	(Philippines) Gina Iniong	def.	(Australia) Natalie Hills	Decision (Unanimous)	3	5:00	
Women's Flyweight 57 kg	(Brazil) Michelle Nicolini	def.	(Russia) Irina Mazepa	Submission (Armbar)	1	2:11	
Strawweight 52 kg	(Philippines) Robin Catalan	def.	(Philippines) Jeremy Miado	Decision (Split)	3	5:00	

== ONE Championship: Dynasty of Heroes ==
ONE: Dynasty of Heroes
- Promotion: ONE Championship
- Date: May 26, 2017
- Venue: Singapore Indoor Stadium
- City: Kallang, Singapore

Event chronology
ONE: Kings of Destiny	ONE: Dynasty of Heroes	ONE: Light of a Nation

ONE Championship: Dynasty of Heroes (also known as ONE Championship 54) was a mixed martial arts event held by ONE Championship on May 26, 2017 at the Singapore Indoor Stadium in Kallang, Singapore.

=== Background ===
This event featured two world title fight for the ONE Women's Atomweight Championship Angela Lee of Singapore makes the second defense of her title against top contender Istela Nunes of Brazil as ONE Championship: Dynasty of Heroes headliner, for the ONE Welterweight Championship ONE Welterweight World Champion Ben Askren defends his title against rising young Malaysian star Agilan Thani as co-main event.

Also features former ONE strawweight champion Dejdamrong Sor Amnuaysirichoke against indonesian prospect Adrian Matheis.

The event has also featured a 15 minutes submission-only grappling super-match between former ONE Championship lightweight champion Shinya Aoki and multiple time BJJ champion Garry Tonon. If no submissions within the allotted time, match is declared a draw.

=== Results ===
ONE Championship: Dynasty of Heroes
Weight Class				Method	Round	Time	Notes
Women's Atomweight 52 kg	(Canada) Angela Lee (c)	def.	(Brazil) Istela Nunes	Submission (Anaconda Choke)	2	2:18	For the ONE Women's Atomweight Championship
Welterweight 61 kg	(United States) Ben Askren (c)	def.	(Malaysia) Agilan Thani	Submission (Arm-Triangle Choke)	1	2:20	For the ONE Welterweight Championship
Lightweight 70 kg	(Sweden) Zebaztian Kadestam	def.	(Brazil) Luis Santos	KO (Knees)	3	2:18	
Grappling Super-Match	(United States) Garry Tonon	def.	(Japan) Shinya Aoki	Submission (Heel Hook)	1	7:47	
Strawweight 52 kg	(Thailand) Dejdamrong Sor Amnuaysirichoke	def.	(Indonesia) Adrian Matheis	KO (Punch)	1	4:26	
Lightweight 70 kg	(Singapore) Amir Khan	def.	(India) Rajinder Singh Meena	TKO (Punches)	1	1:29	
Preliminary Card
Women's Strawweight 52 kg	(Singapore) Tiffany Teo	def.	(United States) Rebecca Heintzman	Decision (Unanimous)	3	5:00	
Women's Atomweight 47 kg	(Thailand) Rika Ishige	def.	(Indonesia) Nita Dea	Submission (Rear Naked Choke)	1	2:39	
Catchweight 69 kg	(China) Lei Chen	def.	(Indonesia) Jeremy Meciaz	Submission (Armbar)	1	2:11	

== ONE Championship: Light of a Nation ==
ONE: Light of a Nation
- Promotion: ONE Championship
- Date: June 30, 2017
- Venue: Thuwunna National Indoor Stadium
- City: Yangon, Myanmar

Event chronology
ONE: Dynasty of Heroes	ONE: Light of a Nation	ONE: Conquest of Kings

ONE Championship: Light of a Nation (also known as ONE Championship 55) was a mixed martial arts event held by ONE Championship on June 30, 2017 at the Thuwunna National Indoor Stadium in Yangon, Myanmar.

=== Results ===
ONE Championship: Light of a Nation
Weight Class				Method	Round	Time	Notes
Middleweight 84 kg	(Myanmar) Aung La Nsang	def.	(Russia) Vitaly Bigdash (c)	Decision (Unanimous)	5	5:00	For the ONE Middleweight Championship
Flyweight 57 kg	(Myanmar) Saw Min Min	def.	(Myanmar) Shwe Kyaung Thar	Submission (Guillotine Choke)	1	1:43	Myanmar Flyweight Tournament Final
Women's Strawweight 52 kg	(Japan) Mei Yamaguchi	def.	(Taiwan) Jenny Huang	Submission (Rear Naked Choke)	2	4:00	
Featherweight 66 kg	(Brazil) Bruno Pucci	def.	(Philippines) Jimmy Yabo	TKO (Punches)	1	2:12	
Bantamweight 61 kg	(Myanmar) Tha Pyay Nyo	def.	(Myanmar) Htet Aung Oo	KO (Punch)	1	0:16	
Bantamweight 61 kg	(United States) Kevin Chung	def.	(China) Zhong Qingya	TKO (Punches)	2	3:37	
Preliminary Card
Flyweight 57 kg	(Myanmar) Ye Thway Ne	def.	(Myanmar) Pat Kyaw Lin Naing	Decision (Unanimous)	2	5:00	Myanmar Flyweight Tournament Semi-Finals
Flyweight 57 kg	(Myanmar) Saw Min Min	def.	(Myanmar) Kyar Ba Hein	KO (Punch)	1	3:54	Myanmar Flyweight Tournament Semi-Finals
Flyweight 67 kg	(Myanmar) Thway Thit Win Hlaing	vs.	(Myanmar) Soe Htet Oo	Draw	5	5:00	Lethwei fight

== ONE Championship: Conquest of Kings (cancelled) ==
ONE: Conquest of Kings
- Promotion: ONE Championship
- Date: July 29, 2017
- Venue: GOR Kertajaya
- City: Surabaya, Indonesia

Event chronology
ONE: Light of a Nation	ONE: Conquest of Kings	ONE: Kings and Conquerors

ONE Championship: Conquest of Kings was cancelled

=== Results ===
ONE Championship: Conquest of Kings
Weight Class				Method	Round	Time	Notes
Flyweight 57 kg	(Kazakhstan) Kairat Akhmetov (c)	vs.	(Brazil) Adriano Moraes (ic)				For the Unification of ONE Flyweight Championship
Bantamweight 61 kg	(Finland) Toni Tauru	vs.	(Brazil) Leandro Issa				
Light Heavyweight 93 kg	(Poland) Marcin Prachnio	vs.	(Brazil) Gilberto Galvão				
Featherweight 66 kg	(Indonesia) Sunoto Peringkat	vs.	(Philippines) Rocky Batolbatol				
Bantamweight 61 kg	(Liberia) Jerome S. Paye	vs.	(Thailand) Yodsanan Sityodtong				
Flyweight 57 kg	(Philippines) Danny Kingad	vs.	(China) Getu Hexi				
Flyweight 57 kg	(Indonesia) Stefer Rahardian	vs.	(Singapore) Nico Soernarte				

== ONE Championship: Kings and Conquerors ==
ONE: Kings and Conquerors
- Promotion: ONE Championship
- Date: August 5, 2017
- Venue: Cotai Arena
- City: Macau, China

Event chronology
ONE: Conquest of Kings	ONE: Kings and Conquerors	ONE: Quest for Greatness

ONE Championship: Kings and Conquerors (also known as ONE Championship 56) was a mixed martial arts event held by ONE Championship on August 5, 2017 at the Cotai Arena in Macau, China.

=== Results ===
ONE Championship: Kings and Conquerors
Weight Class				Method	Round	Time	Notes
Bantamweight 61 kg	(Brazil) Bibiano Fernandes (c)	def.	(United States) Andrew Leone	Submission (Rear Naked Choke)	1	1:47	For the ONE Bantamweight Championship
Flyweight 57 kg	(Brazil) Adriano Moraes (ic)	def.	(Kazakhstan) Kairat Akhmetov (c)	Decision (Unanimous)	5	5:00	For the Unification of ONE Flyweight Championship
Featherweight 66 kg	(Russia) Timofey Nastyukhin	def.	(Japan) Koji Ando	Decision (Unanimous)	3	5:00	
Lightweight 70 kg	(Thailand) Shannon Wiratchai	def.	(India) Rajinder Singh Meena	KO (Knee)	1	0:29	
Flyweight 57 kg	(Japan) Hayato Suzuki	def.	(Philippines) Joshua Pacio	Submission (Rear Naked Choke)	1	3:17	
Featherweight 66 kg	(South Korea) Kotetsu Boku	def.	(Philippines) Eric Kelly	TKO (Punches)	3	3:27	
Flyweight 57 kg	(China) Lei Chen	def.	(Malaysia) Saiful Merican	Submission (Armbar)	3	3:58	
Preliminary Card
Women's Atomweight 47 kg	(Philippines) Jomary Torres	def.	(Thailand) Rika Ishige	Submission (Rear Naked Choke)	2	1:58	
Bantamweight 61 kg	(Brazil) Leandro Issa	def.	(Myanmar) Toni Tauru	TKO (Punches)	2	1:36	
Featherweight 66 kg	(Russia) Magomed Idrisov	def.	(Brazil) Herbert Burns	Decision (Unanimous)	3	5:00	
Light Heavyweight 93 kg	(Poland) Marcin Prachnio	def.	(Brazil) Gilberto Galvão	KO (Punches)	1	1:23	
Middleweight 84 kg	(Brazil) Leandro Ataides	def.	(Poland) Michał Pasternak	Decision (Unanimous)	3	5:00	

== ONE Championship: Quest for Greatness ==
ONE: Quest for Greatness
- Promotion: ONE Championship
- Date: August 18, 2017
- Venue: Stadium Negara
- City: Kuala Lumpur, Malaysia

Event chronology
ONE: Kings and Conquerors	ONE: Quest for Greatness	ONE: Shanghai

ONE Championship: Quest for Greatness (also known as ONE Championship 57) was a mixed martial arts event held by ONE Championship on August 18, 2017 at the Stadium Negara in Kuala Lumpur, Malaysia.

=== Results ===
ONE Championship: Quest for Greatness
Weight Class				Method	Round	Time	Notes
Featherweight 66 kg	(Australia) Martin Nguyen	def.	(Russia) Marat Gafurov (c)	KO (Punch)	2	1:27	For the ONE Featherweight Championship
Lightweight 70 kg	(Malaysia) Ev Ting	def.	(Japan) Nobutatsu Suzuki	TKO (Punches)	1	3:29	
Middleweight 84 kg	(Malaysia) Agilan Thani	def.	(Egypt) Sherif Mohamed	Decision (Unanimous)	3	5:00	
Bantamweight 61 kg	(Philippines) Kevin Belingon	def.	(Australia) Reece McLaren	TKO (Punches)	1	1:02	
Flyweight 57 kg	(Malaysia) Gianni Subba	def.	(Japan) Riku Shibuya	Decision (Unanimous)	3	5:00	
Women's Flyweight 57 kg	(Indonesia) May Ooi	def.	(Malaysia) Ann Osman	Submission (Rear-Naked Choke)	1	3:27	
Strawweight 52 kg	(Thailand) Dejdamrong Sor Amnuaysirichoke	def.	(Philippines) Robin Catalan	TKO (Knees)	2	0:46	
Preliminary Card
Featherweight 66 kg	(Canada) Christian Lee	def.	(Malaysia) Keanu Subba	Submission (Armbar)	3	1:11	
Featherweight 66 kg	(United States) Emilio Urrutia	def.	(Philippines) Edward Kelly	Decision (Unanimous)	3	5:00	
Flyweight 57 kg	(Philippines) Rene Catalan	def.	(China) Huo You Ga Bu	Decision (Unanimous)	3	5:00	

== ONE Championship: Shanghai ==
ONE: Shanghai
- Promotion: ONE Championship
- Date: September 2, 2017
- Venue: Shanghai Oriental Sports Center
- City: Shanghai, China

Event chronology
ONE: Quest for Greatness	ONE: Shanghai	ONE: Total Victory

ONE Championship: Shanghai (also known as ONE Championship 58) was a mixed martial arts event held by ONE Championship on September 2, 2017 at the Shanghai Oriental Sports Center in Shanghai, China.

=== Results ===
ONE Championship: Shanghai
Weight Class				Method	Round	Time	Notes
Welterweight 77 kg	(United States) Ben Askren (c)	def.	(Sweden) Zebaztian Kadestam	TKO (Punches)	2	4:09	For the ONE Welterweight Championship
Flyweight 57 kg	(China) Haobin Ma	def.	(China) Getu Hexi	Submission (Guillotine Choke)	2	4:50	
Lightweight 70 kg	(Singapore) Amir Khan	def.	(Czech Republic) Jaroslav Jartim	KO (Head Kick and Punches)	1	3:46	
Women's Strawweight 52 kg	(China) Xu Chun Yan	def.	(Cambodia) Ehpriyanut Phouthong	Decision (Unanimous)	3	5:00	
Lightweight 70 kg	(Japan) Tetsuya Yamada	def.	(United States) Kyle Rozewski	Submission (Rear-Naked Choke)	1	1:56	
Featherweight 66 kg	(Thailand) Sagetdao Petpayathai	def.	(Egypt) Mahmoud Mohamed	TKO (Punches)	1	1:41	
Preliminary Card
Women's Strawweight 52 kg	(China) Jie Miao	def.	(Egypt) Mona Samir	Submission (Armbar)	1	0:49	
Lightweight 70 kg	(China) Ze Hao Zhang	def.	(China) Cheng Chao Li	TKO (Punches)	3	2:53	
Featherweight 66 kg	(China) Chao Xie	def.	(Malaysia) Mark Marcellinus	Submission (Kimura)	1	1:28	

== ONE Championship: Total Victory ==
ONE: Total Victory
- Promotion: ONE Championship
- Date: September 16, 2017
- Venue: Jakarta Convention Center
- City: Jakarta, Indonesia

Event chronology
ONE: Shanghai	ONE: Total Victory	ONE: Hero's Dream

ONE Championship: Total Victory (also known as ONE Championship 59) was a mixed martial arts event held by ONE Championship on September 16, 2017 at the Jakarta Convention Center in Jakarta, Indonesia.

=== Results ===
ONE Championship: Total Victory
Weight Class				Method	Round	Time	Notes
Flyweight 57 kg	(Kazakhstan) Kairat Akhmetov	def.	(Philippines) Geje Eustaquio	Decision (Split)	3	5:00	
Flyweight 57 kg	(Indonesia) Stefer Rahardian	def.	(Cambodia) Sim Bunsrun	Submission (Rear-Naked Choke)	1	1:07	
Heavyweight 120 kg	(Hong Kong) Alain Ngalani	def.	(Japan) Hideki Sekine	KO (Punch)	1	0:11	
Flyweight 57 kg	(Philippines) Roy Doliguez	def.	(Brazil) Yago Bryan	KO (Punch)	3	2:58	
Featherweight 66 kg	(Malaysia) Hisyam Samsudin	def.	(Indonesia) Jeremy Meciaz	TKO (Knees and Elbows)	1	2:47	
Flyweight 57 kg	(Philippines) Ramon Gonzalez	def.	(China) Deligerihu Liu	Submission (Arm-Triangle Choke)	2	1:52	
Flyweight 57 kg	(Indonesia) Adrian Matheis	def.	(Cambodia) Phat Soda	Submission (Rear-Naked Choke)	1	3:11	
Preliminary Card
Bantamweight 61 kg	(Indonesia) Riski Umar	def.	(Indonesia) Adi Nugroho	KO (Punches)	1	2:00	
Catchweight 68.3 kg	(Cambodia) Thai Rithy	def.	(Liberia) Jerome S. Paye	KO (Punches)	2	0:19	
Special Attraction	(Indonesia) Abdurrauf Abdul Karim	def.	(Indonesia) Hendri Fardli	Decision (Unanimous)	1		Traditional Silat Bout

== ONE Championship: Hero's Dream ==
ONE: Hero's Dream
- Promotion: ONE Championship
- Date: November 3, 2017
- Venue: Thuwunna Stadium
- City: Yangon, Myanmar

Event chronology
ONE: Total Victory	ONE: Hero's Dream	ONE: Legends of the World

ONE Championship: Hero's Dream (also known as ONE Championship 60) was a mixed martial arts event held by ONE Championship on November 3, 2017 at the Thuwunna Stadium in Yangon, Myanmar.

=== Results ===
ONE Championship: Immortal Pursuit
Weight Class				Method	Round	Time	Notes
Light Heavyweight 93 kg	(Myanmar) Aung La Nsang	def.	(Hong Kong) Alain Ngalani	Submission (Guillotine Choke)	1	4:31	
Featherweight 66 kg	(Myanmar) Phoe Thaw	def.	(Myanmar) Saw Ba Oo	Decision (Split)	3	5:00	
Flyweight 57 kg	(China) Haobin Ma	def.	(Philippines) Eugene Toquero	Submission (Armbar)	1	4:51	
Flyweight 57 kg	(Myanmar) Ye Thway Ne	def.	(Myanmar) Saw Thar Nge	KO (Punch)	1	3:50	
Strawweight 52 kg	(Thailand) Pongsiri Mitsatit	def.	(Philippines) Jeremy Miado	TKO (Retirement)	2	4:23	
Bantamweight 61 kg	(Myanmar) Saw Darwait	def.	(Myanmar) Sit Mhan	Submission (Rear-Naked Choke)	1	0:41	
Bantamweight 61 kg	(China) Lei Chen	def.	(Philippines) Bernard Soriano	TKO (Punches)	2	1:06	
Preliminary Card
Women's Strawweight 52 kg	(China) Jie Miao	def.	(Australia) Amira Hafizovic	Submission (Armbar)	1	0:45	
Lightweight 70 kg	(China) Ze Hao Zhang	def.	(India) Bala Shetty	TKO (Punches)	1	2:01	
Women's Atomweight 47 kg	(Philippines) Jomary Torres	def.	(Bahrain) Nita Dea	Decision (Unanimous)	3	5:00	

== ONE Championship: Legends of the World ==
ONE: Legends of the World
- Promotion: ONE Championship
- Date: November 10, 2017
- Venue: Mall of Asia Arena
- City: Manila, Philippines

Event chronology
ONE: Hero's Dream	ONE: Legends of the World	ONE: Immortal Pursuit

ONE Championship: Legends of the World (also known as ONE Championship 61) was a mixed martial arts event held by ONE Championship on November 10, 2017 at the Mall of Asia Arena in Manila, Philippines.

=== Results ===
ONE Championship: Legends of the World
Weight Class				Method	Round	Time	Notes
Lightweight 70 kg	(Australia) Martin Nguyen	def.	(Philippines) Eduard Folayang (c)	KO (Punches)	2	2:20	For the ONE Lightweight Championship
Flyweight 57 kg	(Brazil) Adriano Moraes (c)	def.	(Philippines) Danny Kingad	Submission (Rear-Naked Choke)	1	4:45	For the ONE Flyweight Championship
Bantamweight 61 kg	(Philippines) Kevin Belingon	def.	(United States) Kevin Chung	Decision (Unanimous)	3	5:00	
Flyweight 57 kg	(Brazil) Alex Silva	def.	(Japan) Hayato Suzuki	Submission (Armbar)	1	1:22	
Flyweight 57 kg	(Australia) Reece McLaren	def.	(Thailand) Anatpong Bunrad	Submission (D'Arce Choke)	1	4:52	
Featherweight 66 kg	(China) Zhikang Zhao	def.	(Cambodia) Thai Rithy	Submission (Rear-Naked Choke)	1	2:31	
Preliminary Card
Women's Strawweight 52 kg	(Philippines) Gina Iniong	def.	(Indonesia) Priscilla Hertati Lumban Gaol	TKO (Punches)	2	2:12	
Strawweight 52 kg	(Philippines) Joshua Pacio	def.	(Philippines) Roy Doliguez	KO (Spinning Back Fist)	2	0:38	
Featherweight 66 kg	(China) Chao Xie	def.	(Malaysia) Kelvin Ong	TKO (Doctor Stoppage)	1	1;48	
Strawweight 52 kg	(China) Xuewen Peng	def.	(Cambodia) Phat Soda	KO (Suplex)	1	2:17	

== ONE Championship: Immortal Pursuit ==
ONE: Immortal Pursuit
- Promotion: ONE Championship
- Date: November 24, 2017
- Venue: Singapore Indoor Stadium
- City: Kallang, Singapore

Event chronology
ONE: Legends of the World	ONE: Immortal Pursuit	ONE: Warriors of the World

ONE Championship: Immortal Pursuit (also known as ONE Championship 62) was a mixed martial arts event held by ONE Championship on November 24, 2017 at the Singapore Indoor Stadium in Kallang, Singapore.

=== Results ===
ONE Championship: Immortal Pursuit
Weight Class				Method	Round	Time	Notes
Welterweight	(United States) Ben Askren	def.	(Japan) Shinya Aoki	TKO (Punches)	1	0:57	
Lightweight 70 kg	(Singapore) Amir Khan	def.	(Australia) Adrian Pang	Decision (Unanimous)	3	5:00	
Bantamweight 61 kg	(Brazil) Leandro Issa	def.	(South Korea) Dae Hwan Kim	Decision (Unanimous)	3	5:00	
Strawweight 52 kg	(Singapore) May Ooi	def.	(Cambodia) Vy Srey Khouch	Submission (Rear-Naked Choke)	1	3:58	
Featherweight 66 kg	(Pakistan) Ahmed Mujtaba	def.	(China) Kai Wen Li	DQ (Punches to Back of Head)	1		
Strawweight 52 kg	(Singapore) Tiffany Teo	def.	(India) Puja Tomar	Submission (Armbar)	1	4:07	
Strawweight 52 kg	(Japan) Mei Yamaguchi	def.	(Philippines) Gina Iniong	Decision (Unanimous)	3	5:00	
Preliminary Card
Lightweight 70 kg	(France) Arnaud Lepont	def.	(Philippines) Richard Corminal	Submission (Arm-Triangle Choke)	1	3:16	
Lightweight 70 kg	(Malaysia) Muhammad Aiman	def.	(China) Yang Fei	Decision (Unanimous)	3	5:00	
Flyweight 52 kg	(China) Miao Li Tao	def.	(Cambodia) Sim Bunsrun	TKO (Punches)	1	1:49	

== ONE Championship: Warriors of the World ==
ONE: Warriors of the World
- Promotion: ONE Championship
- Date: December 9, 2017
- Venue: Impact Arena
- City: Bangkok, Thailand

Event chronology
ONE: Immortal Pursuit	ONE: Warriors of the World	ONE: Kings of Courage

ONE Championship: Warriors of the World (also known as ONE Championship 63) was a mixed martial arts event held by ONE Championship on December 9, 2017 at the Impact Arena, in Bangkok, Thailand.

=== Results ===
ONE Championship: Warriors of the World
Weight Class				Method	Round	Time	Notes
Strawweight 56 kg	(Brazil) Alex Silva	def.	(Japan) Yoshitaka Naito (C)	Decision (Unanimous)	5	5:00	For the ONE Strawweight Championship.
Lightweight 77 kg	(Russia) Rasul Yakhyaev	def.	(Thailand) Shannon Wiratchai	Decision (Unanimous)	3	5:00	
Featherweight 70 kg	(Canada) Christian Lee	def.	(Japan) Kotetsu Boku	KO/TKO (slam and punches)	1	3:24	
Strawweight 56 kg	(Japan) Riku Shibuya	def.	(Thailand) Dejdamrong Sor Amnuaysirichoke	Submission (Guillotine Choke)	1	2:36	
Atomweight 52 kg	(Thailand) Rika Ishige	def.	(Philippines) Rome Trinidad	Submission (Rear-Naked Choke)	2	4:04	
Strawweight 56 kg	(China) Xiong Jingnan	def.	(Philippines) April Osenio	KO/TKO (punches)	1	3:44	
Featherweight 70 kg	(Thailand) Sagetdao Petpayathai	def.	(Philippines) Jimmy Yabo	KO/TKO (knee)	1	2:44	
Preliminary Card
Flyweight 61 kg	(Thailand) Yodsanan Sityodtong	def.	(Indonesia) Dodi Mardian	KO (Punch)	1	1:32	
Strawweight 56 kg	(Thailand) Kritsada Kongsrichai	def.	(Philippines) Rabin Catalan	KO/TKO (Slam into ground and pound)	1	3:01	
Bantamweight 65 kg	(China) Tang De Pan	def.	(Bangladesh) Asraful Islam	Decision (Unanimous)	3	5:00	

== See also ==
- 2017 in UFC
- Bellator MMA in 2017
- 2017 in Rizin Fighting Federation
- 2017 in Absolute Championship Berkut
- 2017 in M-1 Global
- 2017 in LUX Fight League
- 2017 in Konfrontacja Sztuk Walki
- 2017 in Road FC
- 2017 in Kunlun Fight
