= Ann Osman =

Malaysian martial artist

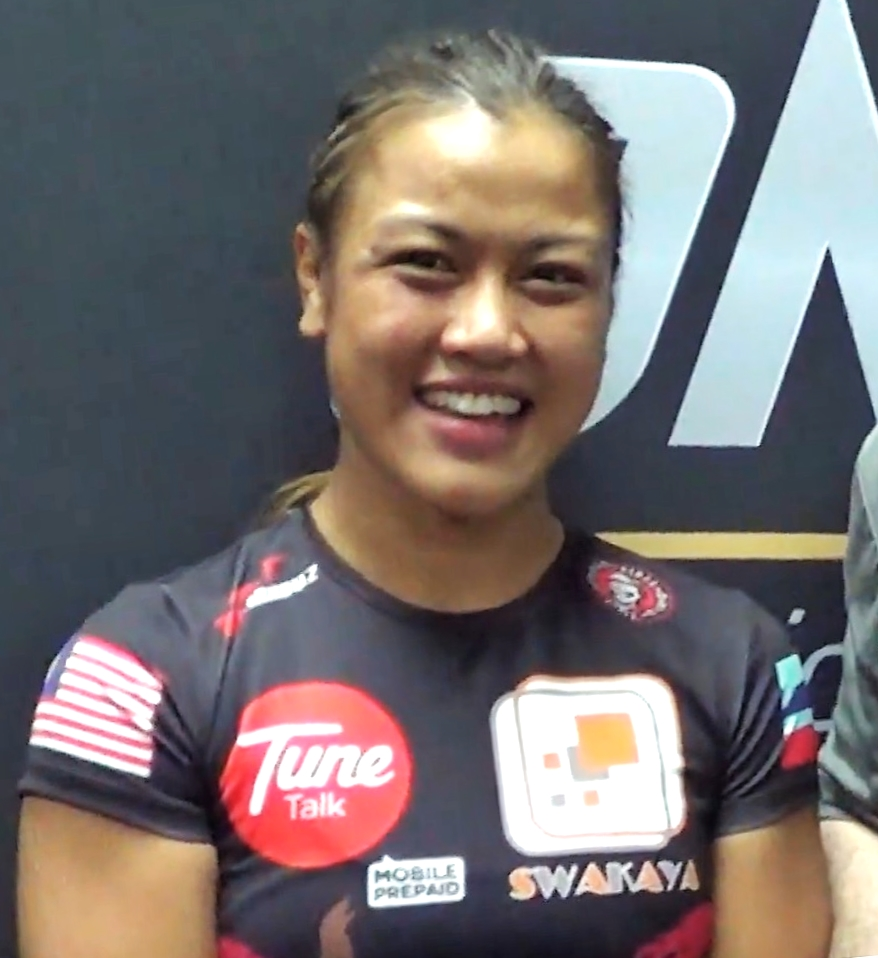
- Osman interviewed in 2018
- Born: 19 June 1986 (age 40); Kota Kinabalu, Sabah, Malaysia
- Other names: Athena
- Height: 5 ft 3 in (160 cm)
- Weight: 123.0 lb (56 kg; 8 st 11 lb)
- Division: Flyweight & Straw weight
- Style: Muay Thai, Brazilian Jiu jitsu, Wrestling
- Team: Borneo Tribal Squad
- Teacher: AJ "Pyro" Lias Mansor
- Years active: 2012–2018

Mixed martial arts record
- Total: 10
- Wins: 5
- By knockout: 2
- By submission: 2
- By decision: 1
- Losses: 4
- By knockout: 1
- By submission: 2
- By decision: 1
- Draws: 0
- No contests: 1

Other information
- Occupation: Entrepreneur
- University: University Putra Malaysia
- Children: 1

Ann "Athena" Osman (born 19 June 1986) is a Malaysian mixed martial artist who became the country's first female pro mixed martial artist.

Born in Kota Kinabalu, Sabah of mixed-race parentage, to a Malay father from Selangor and Kadazan-Dusun mother from Tambunan and grew up in Illinois, United States, Osman is Malaysia's first-ever woman to compete professionally in the ONE Fighting Championship (ONE FC) mixed martial arts competition. She has trained for more than 12 years in MMA and has a strong background in Muay Thai, Brazilian jiu-jitsu, Wrestling and Boxing where she was competing out of the Borneo Tribal Squad gym.

In January 2018, she announced her retirement from her MMA career with a professional record of 5–4, wanting to focus on her new careers.

She has been married and has a son.

== Mixed martial arts record ==
Professional record breakdown
9 matches	5 wins	4 losses
By knockout	2	1
By submission	2	2
By decision	1	1

Res.	Record	Opponent	Method	Event	Date	Round	Time	Location	Notes
Loss	5–4	May Ooi	Submission (rear-naked choke)	ONE: Quest for Greatness	August 18, 2017	1	3:27	Kuala Lumpur, Malaysia	
Win	5–3	Vy Srey Khouch	TKO (elbows and punches)	ONE: Throne of Tigers	February 10, 2017	1	4:58	Kuala Lumpur, Malaysia	
Loss	4–3	April Osenio	Submission (guillotine choke)	ONE: Unbreakable Warriors	September 2, 2016	1	4:09	Kuala Lumpur, Malaysia	
Win	4–2	Haiat Farag Youssef	Submission (armbar)	ONE: Dynasty of Champions 6	February 16, 2018	1	3:59	Hefei, China	
Loss	3–2	Irina Mazepa	KO (punches)	ONE: Tigers of Asia	October 9, 2015	1	3:05	Kuala Lumpur, Malaysia	
Win	3–1	Walaa Abas	Submission (rear-naked choke)	ONE: Age of Champions	March 13, 2015	1	2:23	Kuala Lumpur, Malaysia	
Win	2–1	Aya Saeid Saber	TKO (elbows)	ONE FC: Roar of Tigers	October 17, 2014	1	3:15	Kuala Lumpur, Malaysia	
Win	1–1	Ana Julaton	Decision (split)	ONE FC: Reign of Champions	August 29, 2014	3	5:00	Dubai, United Arab Emirates	Flyweight debut.
Loss	0–1	Sherilyn Lim	Decision (split)	ONE FC: Total Domination	October 18, 2013	3	5:00	Kallang, Singapore	Strawweight debut.
