= Dejdamrong Sor Amnuaysirichoke =

Thai mixed martial arts fighter

- Born: 7 November 1978 (age 47); Trang, Thailand
- Nationality: Thai
- Height: 160 cm (5 ft 3 in)
- Weight: 56.7 kg (125 lb; 9 st)
- Division: Strawweight (2014–2017); Flyweight (2017–2022) (Note: ONE Championship refers to their 125 lb class as Strawweight, but under the Association of Boxing Commissions in the United States, 125 lbs is considered Flyweight.)
- Reach: 65.7 in (167 cm)
- Style: Muay Thai, Kickboxing, BJJ
- Stance: Southpaw
- Team: Evolve MMA
- Years active: ?–2010 (Muay Thai); 2014–2022 (MMA)

Kickboxing record
- Total: 350
- Wins: 282
- Losses: 65
- Draws: 3

Mixed martial arts record
- Total: 19
- Wins: 12
- By knockout: 7
- By submission: 3
- By decision: 2
- Losses: 7
- By knockout: 3
- By submission: 2
- By decision: 2

Other information
- Mixed martial arts record from Sherdog

Dejdamrong Sor Amnuaysirichoke (Thai: เดชดำรงค์ ส.อำนวยศิริโชค; born November 7, 1978) is a Thai former mixed martial artist who has competed in ONE Championship, where he competed in the strawweight division. He is a former ONE Strawweight World Champion, being the inaugural titleholder, and is considered to be one of the most successful Thai mixed martial artists, having become the first Thai to win an MMA world title.

Prior to mixed martial arts, Dejdamrong was a Muay Thai fighter with 350 fights who won multiple Lumpinee Stadium titles in three different weight classes.

Aside from competing in mixed martial arts, Dejdamrong was an instructor at the Evolve MMA gym based in Singapore until 2023. He currently owns and coaches at Sor Dejdamrong Muaythai in Phuket, Thailand.

== Muay Thai career ==
Amnuaysirichoke competed in Muay Thai for over 20 years, and was a three-division Lumpinee Stadium champion at mini flyweight, light flyweight, and flyweight; and amassed an unofficial record of 282-65-3. He retired in 2007.

== Mixed martial arts career ==
=== ONE Championship ===
==== 2014–2016: Early career & ONE Strawweight World Champion ====
Amnuaysirichoke began his professional MMA career in 2014 for ONE Fighting Championship. On June 14, 2014, Dejdamrong made his debut at ONE FC: Era of Champions, where he defeated Jomanz Omanz by first-round TKO.

He started out undefeated at 6–0, including a win over Roy Doliguez on May 22, 2015, to claim the ONE Strawweight World Championship, becoming the most successful Thai mixed martial artist and first Thai world champion in MMA. Dejdamrong was the ONE World Champion for over a year before losing the title to Yoshitaka Naito on May 27, 2016. Since losing the Strawweight World Title, Dejdamrong has gone 5–4 in ONE Championship.

==== 2017 ====
On March 11, 2017, he lost to future ONE Strawweight World Champion Joshua Pacio by split decision at ONE Championship: Warrior Kingdom.

On May 26, 2017, Dejdamrong defeated Adrian Mattheis by first-round KO at ONE Championship: Dynasty of Heroes.

On August 18, 2017, he stopped Robin Catalan by TKO in the second round at ONE Championship: Quest for Greatness.

On December 9, 2017, Dejdamrong lost to Riku Shibuya by second-round submission via guillotine choke at ONE Championship: Warriors of the World.

==== 2018 ====
Dejdamrong then lost to Jeremy Miado by first-round KO on March 24, 2018, at ONE Championship: Iron Will.

He would bounce back with a second-round submission victory over Himanshu Kaushik via rear-naked choke on November 9, 2018, at ONE Championship: Heart of the Lion.

==== 2019 ====
Dejdamrong faced Jeremy Miado in a rematch on February 22, 2019, at ONE Championship: Call to Greatness. This time, he was able to secure a second-round TKO victory.

He then faced Miao Li Tao on May 17, 2019, at ONE Championship: Enter the Dragon, where he lost by first-round knockout.

Nevertheless, Dejdamrong was able to close out 2019 on a high note with a third-round TKO victory over Muhammad Imran on November 22, 2019, at ONE Championship: Edge Of Greatness.

==== 2020 ====
Dejdamrong competed only once in 2020. On October 10, 2020, he faced Hexi Getu at ONE Championship: Reign of Dynasties. After getting dominated on the ground over three rounds, he lost by split decision.

==== 2021 ====
Dejdamrong is scheduled to face Banma Duoji at ONE Championship: Battleground 3 on August 27, 2021. He won by technical knockout in the second round.

==== 2022 ====
Dejdamrong faced Danial Williams at ONE: Bad Blood on February 11, 2022. He lost after a liver punch stopped the bout in the second round.

==== Retirement ====
Following his fight with Williams, Dejdamrong announced his retirement on Instagram.

== Championships and accomplishments ==
=== Mixed martial arts ===
- ONE Championship
  - ONE Strawweight World Championship (One time)

=== Muay Thai ===
- Lumpinee Stadium
  - 2× Lumpinee Stadium Strawweight (105 lbs) Champion (1999)
  - Lumpinee Stadium Light Flyweight (108 lbs) Champion (2002)
- Siam Omnoi Stadium
  - 2006 Omnoi Stadium Champion
  - 2006 Shell Rimula Tournament Winner

== Mixed martial arts record ==
Professional record breakdown
19 matches	12 wins	7 losses
By knockout	7	3
By submission	3	2
By decision	2	2
Draws	0	

Res.	Record	Opponent	Method	Event	Date	Round	Time	Location	Notes
Loss	12–7	Danial Williams	KO (punch to the body)	ONE: Bad Blood	February 11, 2022	2	1:35	Kallang, Singapore	
Win	12–6	Banma Duoji	TKO (knees and punches)	ONE: Battleground 3	August 27, 2021	2	3:31	Kallang, Singapore	
Loss	11–6	Hexi Getu	Decision (split)	ONE: Reign of Dynasties	October 10, 2020	3	5:00	Kallang, Singapore	
Win	11–5	Muhammad Imran	TKO (punches)	ONE: Edge Of Greatness	November 22, 2019	3	1:21	Kallang, Singapore	
Loss	10–5	Miao Li Tao	KO (punch)	ONE: Enter the Dragon	May 17, 2019	1	4:09	Kallang, Singapore	
Win	10–4	Jeremy Miado	TKO (punches)	ONE: Call to Greatness	February 22, 2019	2	2:38	Kallang, Singapore	
Win	9–4	Himanshu Kaushik	Submission (rear-naked choke)	ONE: Heart of the Lion	November 9, 2018	2	4:45	Kallang, Singapore	
Loss	8–4	Jeremy Miado	KO (punch)	ONE: Iron Will	March 24, 2018	1	1:21	Bangkok, Thailand	
Loss	8–3	Riku Shibuya	Submission (guillotine choke)	ONE: Warriors of the World	December 9, 2017	1	2:36	Bangkok, Thailand	Return to Flyweight.
Win	8–2	Robin Catalan	TKO (knees and elbow)	ONE: Quest for Greatness	August 18, 2017	2	0:46	Kuala Lumpur, Malaysia	
Win	7–2	Adrian Mattheis	KO (punches)	ONE: Dynasty of Heroes	May 26, 2017	1	4:26	Kallang, Singapore	
Loss	6–2	Joshua Pacio	Decision (split)	ONE: Warrior Kingdom	March 11, 2017	3	5:00	Bangkok, Thailand	
Loss	6–1	Yoshitaka Naito	Submission (rear-naked choke)	ONE: Kingdom of Champions	May 27, 2016	4	4:00	Bangkok, Thailand	Lost the ONE Strawweight Championship.
Win	6–0	Yago Bryan	Decision (unanimous)	ONE: Pride of Lions	November 13, 2015	5	5:00	Kallang, Singapore	Non-title bout; Bryan missed weight (116.5 lb).
Win	5–0	Roy Doliguez	Technical Decision (unanimous)	ONE: Warrior's Quest	May 22, 2015	5	3:29	Kallang, Singapore	Strawweight debut. Won the inaugural ONE Strawweight Championship. Accidental hard elbow rendered Doliguez unable to continue.
Win	4–0	Rene Catalan	KO (knee)	ONE FC: Warrior's Way	December 5, 2014	1	2:30	Manila, Philippines	
Win	3–0	Saiful Merican	Submission (armbar)	ONE FC: Roar of the Tigers	October 17, 2014	2	2:12	Kuala Lumpur, Malaysia	
Win	2–0	Ali Yaakub	Submission (rear-naked choke)	ONE FC: Reign of Champions	August 29, 2014	1	2:34	Dubai, United Arab Emirates	
Win	1–0	Jomanz Omanz	TKO (knees)	ONE FC: Era of Champions	June 14, 2014	1	4:33	Jakarta, Indonesia	Flyweight debut.

== Muay Thai record (incomplete) ==
Muay Thai record (incomplete)
Date	Result	Opponent	Event	Location	Method	Round	Time
2010-07-11	Win	(Japan) Oji	Muay Thai Open 12	Tokyo, Japan	Decision (Unanimous)	3	3:00
2009-11-28	Win	(Japan) Kojiro	NJKF ROAD TO REAL KING 14	Tokyo, Japan	TKO	2	2:44
2008-10-05	Win	(Japan) Yuzo Maki	Muay Thai Open 5	Tokyo, Japan	KO (Right Hook)	3	0:39
2008-07-27	Win	(Japan) Hiroki Maeda	NJKF START OF NEW LEGEND IX	Tokyo, Japan	KO (Right High Kick)	2	2:37
2007-07-29	Win	(Japan) Kunitaka	NJKF Fighting Evolution IX Muay Thai Open	Tokyo, Japan	Decision (Unanimous)	5	3:00
2006-01-14	Win	(Thailand)	Omnoi Stadium	Samut Sakhon	Decision	5	3:00
Wins Shell Rimula Tournament and Omnoi Stadium title.
2005-07-12	Loss	(Thailand) Denchiangkwan Laemthong	Lumpinee Stadium	Bangkok, Thailand	Decision	5	3:00
2005-04-12	Win	(Thailand) Denchiangkwan Laemthong	Lumpinee Stadium	Bangkok, Thailand	Decision	5	3:00
2004-12-16	Win	(Thailand) Kulabdaeng Por Pinyo	Rajadamnern Stadium	Bangkok, Thailand	Decision	5	3:00
2004-10-01	Loss	(Thailand) Runganan Sor.Jor.Suwit	Lumpinee Stadium	Bangkok, Thailand	Decision	5	3:00
2004-08-07	Loss	(Thailand) Yoksila Kiatprasarnchai	Lumpinee Stadium	Bangkok, Thailand	Decision	5	3:00
2004-06-22	Win	(Thailand) Newpetch Buamuang Rueangkit	Lumpinee Stadium	Bangkok, Thailand	Decision	5	3:00
2004-03-12	Loss	(Thailand) Jomyut Phitakruchaiden	Lumpinee Stadium	Bangkok, Thailand	Decision	5	3:00
2004-01-23	Loss	(Thailand) Hanchai Kiatyongyuth	Lumpinee Stadium	Bangkok, Thailand	Decision	5	3:00
2003-12-09	Loss	(Thailand) Suwitlek Sit-Ubon	Lumpinee Stadium	Bangkok, Thailand	Decision	5	3:00
For the Lumpinee Stadium 108 lbs title.
2003-08-16	Loss	(Thailand) Saensuk Por Kaewsen		Yala province, Thailand	Decision	5	3:00
2002-06-11	Loss	(Thailand) Panomroonglek Kiatmuu9	Lumpinee Stadium	Bangkok, Thailand	Decision	5	3:00
2002-05-18	Loss	(Thailand) Panomroonglek Kiatmuu9	Lumpinee Stadium	Bangkok, Thailand	Decision	5	3:00
2002-01-05	Draw	(Thailand) Rittidet Maimankon	Lumpinee Stadium	Bangkok, Thailand	Decision	5	3:00
2001-08-21	Loss	(Thailand) Yodsanklai Fairtex	Lumpinee Stadium	Bangkok, Thailand	Decision	5	3:00
2001-04-06	Win	(Thailand) Chawalit Sit.Or	Lumpinee Stadium	Bangkok, Thailand	KO	1	
2000-08-13	Win	(Thailand) Namkabuanlek Nongkeepahuyuth		Thailand	Decision	5	3:00
1999-06-26	Loss	(Thailand) Chatchainoi Sitbenjama	Lumpinee Stadium	Bangkok, Thailand	Decision	5	3:00
1999-05-02	Win	(Thailand) Thailandlek Kiatratchawat		Bangkok, Thailand	Decision	5	3:00
1998-11-16	Win	(Thailand) Khunkrai Srisinthorn	Rajadamnern Stadium	Bangkok, Thailand	Decision	5	3:00
Legend: Win Loss Draw/No contest Notes

== See also ==
- List of current ONE fighters
