= Kairat Akhmetov =

Kazakhstani mixed martial artist and Greco-Roman wrestler

- Born: October 12, 1987 (age 39); Taldy-Kurgan, Kazakh SSR, Soviet Union
- Native name: Қайрат Ахметов
- Other names: The Kazakh
- Nationality: Kazakh
- Height: 165 cm (5 ft 5 in)
- Weight: 61 kg (134 lb; 10 st)
- Division: Flyweight
- Reach: 65 in (165 cm)
- Style: Greco-Roman wrestling, Taekwondo
- Team: Tiger Muay Thai (2016–present); Arlan MMA Pro Team
- Years active: 2010–present

Mixed martial arts record
- Total: 30
- Wins: 28
- By knockout: 5
- By submission: 10
- By decision: 13
- Losses: 2
- By decision: 2

Other information
- Mixed martial arts record from Sherdog

Kairat Akhmetov (Kazakh: Қайрат Ахметов; born October 12, 1987) is a Kazakh professional mixed martial artist and former Greco-Roman wrestler who currently competes in the flyweight division of Absolute Championship Akhmat (ACA). He previously competed for ONE FC, where he is the former ONE FC Flyweight World Champion.

== Background ==
Kairat “The Kazakh” Akhmetov was inspired by his father, an amateur champion in Greco-Roman wrestling, and soon followed in his footsteps. Akhmetov started training in 2000, and proved to be as talented as his father, eventually becoming a three-time National Greco-Roman Champion in Kazakhstan. He also took to Taekwondo, winning a regional championship.

== Mixed martial arts career ==
=== Early career ===
After turning professional in 2010, Akhmetov racked a 19–0 record almost solely in his native Kazakhstani regional circuit before being signed to the ONE Championship in 2015.

=== ONE Championship ===
During his ONE Championship debut at ONE Championship: Dynasty of Champions (Beijing II) Akhmetov won the ONE Flyweight Championship from Adriano Moraes by split decision. During the bout, Akhmetov suffered a back injury, leaving him unable to compete for nearly two years. During Akhmetov's absence, Moraes would capture the Interim ONE Flyweight Championship. The two would meet again at ONE Championship: Kings & Conquerors for the unification bout. Akhmetov lost via unanimous decision.

At ONE Championship: Global Superheroes Akhmetov lost to Geje Eustaquio by unanimous decision in a bout for the Interim ONE Flyweight Championship.

Akhmetov faced Danny Kingad at ONE: Winter Warriors II on December 17, 2021. He won the bout via unanimous decision.

Akhmetov faced Tatsumitsu Wada at ONE 158 on June 3, 2022. Akhmetov won the bout via unanimous decision.

Akhmetov faced Reece McLaren at ONE Fight Night 10 on May 5, 2023. He won the bout via unanimous decision.

On June 16, 2023, it was reported that Akhmetov had tested positive for a banned substance in an out-of-competition drug test and will face a six-month suspension.

== Professional grappling career ==
Akhmetov faced Patchy Mix in the main event of ADXC 6 on October 25, 2024. He lost the match by unanimous decision.

== Championships and accomplishments ==
- ONE Championship
  - ONE Flyweight Championship (One time)

== Mixed martial arts record ==
Professional record breakdown
30 matches	28 wins	2 losses
By knockout	5	0
By submission	10	0
By decision	13	2

Res.	Record	Opponent	Method	Event	Date	Round	Time	Location	Notes
Win	28–2	Mansur Khatuev	Decision (split)	ACA 198	January 9, 2026	3	5:00	Grozny, Russia	
Win	27–2	Reece McLaren	Decision (unanimous)	ONE Fight Night 10	May 5, 2023	3	5:00	Broomfield, Colorado, United States	
Win	26–2	Tatsumitsu Wada	Decision (unanimous)	ONE 158	June 3, 2022	3	5:00	Kallang, Singapore	
Win	25–2	Danny Kingad	Decision (unanimous)	ONE: Winter Warriors II	December 17, 2021	3	5:00	Kallang, Singapore	
Win	24–2	Kim Dae-hwan	Decision (unanimous)	ONE: Collision Course 2	December 18, 2020	3	5:00	Kallang, Singapore	Catchweight (138 lb) bout.
Win	23–2	Reece McLaren	Decision (unanimous)	ONE: A New Era	March 31, 2019	3	5:00	Tokyo, Japan	ONE Flyweight World Grand Prix Quarterfinal.
Win	22–2	Ma Haobin	Decision (unanimous)	ONE: Conquest of Heroes	September 22, 2018	3	5:00	Jakarta, Indonesia	
Loss	21–2	Geje Eustaquio	Decision (unanimous)	ONE: Global Superheroes	January 26, 2018	5	5:00	Pasay, Philippines	Return to Bantamweight. For the Interim ONE Flyweight Championship (135 lb).
Win	21–1	Geje Eustaquio	Decision (split)	ONE: Total Victory	September 16, 2017	3	5:00	Jakarta, Indonesia	
Loss	20–1	Adriano Moraes	Decision (unanimous)	ONE: Kings & Conquerors	August 5, 2017	5	5:00	Macau SAR, China	Lost the ONE Flyweight Championship.
Win	20–0	Adriano Moraes	Decision (split)	ONE: Dynasty of Champions 4	November 21, 2015	5	5:00	Beijing, China	Won the ONE Flyweight Championship.
Win	19–0	Artemij Sitenkov	TKO (corner stoppage)	Alash Pride: Golden Horde	October 17, 2015	1	3:01	Almaty, Kazakhstan	
Win	18–0	Salah Elkas	Decision (unanimous)	Alash Pride: Warriors of the Steppe	November 23, 2014	3	5:00	Almaty, Kazakhstan	Defended the Alash Pride Flyweight Championship.
Win	17–0	Tatsuya Watanabe	Decision (unanimous)	Alash Pride: Great Battle 2	December 19, 2013	3	5:00	Almaty, Kazakhstan	Return to Flyweight. Won the inaugural Alash Pride Flyweight Championship.
Win	16–0	Yoo Jae-nam	Decision (unanimous)	Alash Pride: Grand Prix 2013	July 7, 2013	2	5:00	Almaty, Kazakhstan	Bantamweight debut.
Win	15–0	Nurali Bakirdinova	Submission (choke)	Alash Pride: Great Battle	March 30, 2013	1	3:05	Almaty, Kazakhstan	
Win	14–0	Yang Zhuo	Submission (rear-naked choke)	Alash Pride 2	December 22, 2012	1	1:30	Almaty, Kazakhstan	
Win	13–0	Rafaels Saldes	Submission (armbar)	Bushido Lithuania: Vol. 53	November 30, 2012	1	4:12	London, England	
Win	12–0	Kaan Kazgan	Submission (rear-naked choke)	Bushido Lithuania: Vol. 51	June 8, 2012	2	2:41	Astana, Kazakhstan	
Win	11–0	Vladislav Nikitchenko	Decision (unanimous)	Alash Pride: Nowruz Cup 2012	March 18, 2012	3	5:00	Almaty, Kazakhstan	
Win	10–0	Ruslan Belikov	KO (punch)	Bushido Lithuania: Vol. 50	December 21, 2011	1	0:49	Almaty, Kazakhstan	
Win	9–0	Farkhad Firuzi	Submission (rear-naked choke)	Alash Pride: Cardinal Cup 2011	October 16, 2011	1	3:48	Almaty, Kazakhstan	
Win	8–0	Abdyrashid Zholdasbayev	Submission (rear-naked choke)	Riviera Grand Prix 2011	July 28, 2011	1	1:30	Kapchagai, Kazakhstan	Won the 2011 Riviera Flyweight Grand Prix.
Win	7–0	Djamadyn Zaribzhanov	TKO (punches)	Riviera Grand Prix 2011	July 28, 2011	1	1:04	Kapchagai, Kazakhstan	2011 Riviera Flyweight Grand Prix Semifinal.
Win	6–0	Janibek Omaruly	Submission (Achilles lock)	Iron Horde: Kazakhstan vs. Kyrgyzstan	July 1, 2011	1	2:21	Almaty, Kazakhstan	
Win	5–0	Amanjol Kunanyshbaev	TKO (punches)	Sarbaz Cup 2011: Kazakhstan vs. Uzbekistan	May 1, 2011	1	3:18	Almaty, Kazakhstan	
Win	4–0	Tofik Mamedov	TKO (punches)	S-1: Selection 2011	April 22, 2011	1	4:20	Almaty, Kazakhstan	
Win	3–0	Zirodin Abdulkerimov	Submission (rear-naked choke)	Alash Pride 1	March 19, 2011	1	2:54	Almaty, Kazakhstan	
Win	2–0	Nurazy Balayev	Submission (standing guillotine choke)	Iron Horde Cup 2	August 1, 2010	1	2:38	Almaty, Kazakhstan	
Win	1–0	Anatoly Akhmetov	Submission (rear-naked choke)	Iron Horde Cup 1	May 1, 2010	1	0:48	Almaty, Kazakhstan	Flyweight debut.

== See also ==
- List of male mixed martial artists
- List of ONE Flyweight Champions
