= 2015 in ONE Championship =

Mixed martial arts events

Information
- First date: March 13, 2015

Events
- Total events: 11

Fights
- Title fights: 8

Chronology
| 2014 in ONE | 2015 in ONE Championship | 2016 in ONE |

The year 2015 was the 5th year in the history of the ONE Championship, a mixed martial arts promotion based in Singapore.

== Tournament bracket ==
=== Guangzhou Featherweight Tournament ===
==== ONE Guangzhou Featherweight Tournament bracket ====
Semi-finals
(China) Huang Di Yuan | TKO
(China) Tian Jian She | 1r.
(China) Ma Jia Wen | TKO
(China) Biekemulati Nulijiao | 2r.

Final
(China) Huang Di Yuan | UD
(China) Ma Jia Wen | 3r.

=== Guangzhou Flyweight Tournament ===
==== ONE Guangzhou Flyweight Tournament bracket ====
Semi-finals
(China) Wu Ze | SUB
(China) Wu Hui Qiang | 2r.
(China) Yang Jianbing | UD
(China) Wang Shuo | 3r.

Final
(China) Wu Ze | SD
(China) Yang Jianbing | 3r.

=== Myanmar Lightweight Tournament ===
==== ONE Myanmar Lightweight Tournament bracket ====
Semi-finals
(Myanmar) Saw Ba Oo | TKO
(Myanmar) Dawna Aung | 1r.
(Myanmar) Thway Thit Aung | TKO
(Myanmar) Saw Thae Oo | 1r.

Final
(Myanmar) Saw Ba Oo | 1r.
(Myanmar) Thway Thit Aung | KO

=== Myanmar Featherweight Tournament ===
==== ONE Myanmar Featherweight Tournament bracket ====
Semi-finals
(Myanmar) Myo Man Thit | TKO
(Myanmar) Min Htet Zaw | 1r.
(Myanmar) Tha Pyay Nyo | KO
(Myanmar) Htit Htit Lay | 1r.

Final
(Myanmar) Myo Man Thit | 1r.
(Myanmar) Tha Pyay Nyo | TKO

=== Beijing Featherweight Tournament ===
==== ONE Beijing Featherweight Tournament bracket ====
Semi-finals
(China) Yang Sen | SD
(China) Burigede Alateng | 3r.
(China) Zhang Jiacai | SUB
(China) Cai Feilong | 1r.

Final
(China) Yang Sen | SUB
(China) Zhang Jiacai | 2r.

== List of events ==
ONE Championship
| # | Event title | Date | Arena | Location |
|---|---|---|---|---|
| 1 | ONE Championship: Age of Champions | March 13, 2015 | Putra Indoor Stadium | Kuala Lumpur, Malaysia |
| 2 | ONE Championship: Valor of Champions | April 24, 2015 | Mall of Asia Arena | Pasay, Philippines |
| 3 | ONE Championship: Warrior's Quest | May 22, 2015 | Singapore Indoor Stadium | Kallang, Singapore |
| 4 | ONE Championship: Dynasty of Champions (Guangzhou) | June 20, 2015 | Guangzhou Tianhe Stadium | Guangzhou, China |
| 5 | ONE Championship: Kingdom of Warriors | July 18, 2015 | Thuwunna National Indoor Stadium | Yangon, Myanmar |
| 6 | ONE Championship: Odyssey of Champions | September 27, 2015 | Istora Senayan | Jakarta, Indonesia |
| 7 | ONE Championship: Tigers of Asia | October 9, 2015 | Putra Indoor Stadium | Kuala Lumpur, Malaysia |
| 8 | ONE Championship: Pride of Lions) | November 13, 2015 | Singapore Indoor Stadium | Kallang, Singapore |
| 9 | ONE Championship: Dynasty of Champions (Beijing II) | November 21, 2015 | Olympic Sports Center Gymnasium | Beijing, China |
| 10 | ONE Championship: Kingdom of Khmer | December 5, 2015 | Koh Pich Theatre | Phnom Penh, Cambodia |
| 11 | ONE Championship: Spirit of Champions | December 11, 2015 | Mall of Asia Arena | Pasay, Philippines |

== ONE Championship: Age of Champions ==
ONE Championship: Age of Champions
- Promotion: ONE Championship
- Date: March 13, 2015
- Venue: Putra Indoor Stadium
- City: Kuala Lumpur, Malaysia
- Attendance: 4,412

Event chronology
| ONE Fighting Championship: Dynasty of Champions (Beijing) | ONE Championship: Age of Champions | ONE Championship: Valor of Champions |

ONE Championship: Age of Champions (also known as ONE Championship 25) was a mixed martial arts event held by ONE Championship. The event took place on March 13, 2015 at the Putra Indoor Stadium in Kuala Lumpur, Malaysia.

Background

ONE Championship returned to Malaysia, with this event headlined by Adriano Moraes who made his first ONE Flyweight Championship title defense.

Results

Main card
| Weight class | | | | Method | Round | Time | Notes |
|---|---|---|---|---|---|---|---|
| Flyweight | (Brazil) Adriano Moraes (c) | def. | (Japan) Riku Shibuya | Decision (Unanimous) | 5 | 5:00 | (Note: For the ONE Flyweight Championship) |
| Lightweight | (Malaysia) Peter Davis | def. | (India) Rajinder Singh Meena | TKO (strikes) | 1 | 2:41 |
| Women's Strawweight | (Malaysia) Ann Osman | def. | (Egypt) Walaa Abbas Mohamed Kamaly | Submission (rear naked choke) | 1 | 2:23 |
| Featherweight | (Malaysia) Ev Ting | def. | (Philippines) Cary Bullos | Submission (guillotine choke) | 2 | 1:05 |
| Flyweight | (Malaysia) Gianni Subba | def. | (Vietnam) Thanh Vu | KO (soccer kick and punches) | 1 | 0:20 |
| Women's Atomweight | (Singapore) Kirstie Gannaway | def. | (Philippines) April Osenio | Submission (rear naked choke) | 2 | 2:50 |
| Bantamweight | (Cambodia) Chan Rothana | def. | (Philippines) Ramon Gonzales | TKO (strikes) | 1 | 4:48 |
| Catchweight (179lb) | (Malaysia) Agilan Thani | def. | (Indonesia) Reant Fabriza Rainir | TKO (strikes) | 1 | 1:21 |

== ONE Championship: Valor of Champions ==
ONE Championship: Valor of Champions
- Promotion: ONE Championship
- Date: April 24, 2015
- Venue: Mall of Asia Arena
- City: Pasay, Philippines
- Attendance: 10,000

Event chronology
| ONE Championship: Age of Champions | ONE Championship: Valor of Champions | ONE Championship: Warrior's Quest |

ONE Championship: Valor of Champions (also known as ONE Championship 26) was a mixed martial arts event held by ONE Championship. The event was held on April 24, 2015 at the Mall of Asia Arena in Pasay, Philippines.

Background

ONE Championship returned to Philippines with this event headlined by Ben Askren, who made his first ONE Welterweight Championship title defense.

Results

Main card
| Weight class | | | | Method | Round | Time | Notes |
|---|---|---|---|---|---|---|---|
| Welterweight | (United States) Ben Askren (c) | vs. | (Brazil) Luis Santos | No contest | 1 | 2:19 | (Note: For the ONE Welterweight Championship; fight ended due to an accidental eye poke to Santos during an Askren takedown attempt) |
| Bantamweight | (Philippines) Mark Striegl | def. | (United States) Casey Suire | Submission (rear-naked choke) | 1 | 3:48 |
| Flyweight | (Thailand) Anatpong Bunrad | def. | (Philippines) Geje Eustaquio | Decision (split) | 3 | 5:00 |
| Flyweight | (Philippines) Eugene Toquero | def. | (Indonesia) Brianata Rosadhi | TKO (elbows) | 1 | 3:41 |
| Featherweight | (Philippines) Edward Kelly | def. | (Philippines) Jimmy Yabo | Submission (rear-naked choke) | 1 | 4:05 |
| Featherweight | (Singapore) Amir Khan | def. | (Pakistan) Bashir Ahmad | TKO (doctor stoppage) | 3 | 3:20 |
| Flyweight | (China) Liu Xiaoyang | def. | (Singapore) Nicholas Lee | KO (punch) | 1 | 1:59 |
| Featherweight | (China) Wang Ya Wei | def. | (Indonesia) Sunoto Peringkat | TKO (punches) | 3 | 1:21 |

== ONE Championship: Warrior's Quest ==
ONE Championship: Warrior's Quest
- Promotion: ONE Championship
- Date: May 22, 2015
- Venue: Singapore Indoor Stadium
- City: Kallang, Singapore
- Attendance: 7,200

Event chronology
| ONE Championship: Valor of Champions | ONE Championship: Warrior's Quest | ONE Championship: Dynasty of Champions (Guangzhou) |

ONE Championship: Warrior's Quest (also known as ONE Championship 27) was a mixed martial arts event held by ONE Championship. The event was held on May 22, 2015 at the Singapore Indoor Stadium in Kallang, Singapore.

Background

ONE Championship returned to Singapore with this event headlined by two title fights.

The featherweight bout between Rob Lisita and Timofey Nastyukhin was cancelled after Lisita failed a medical.

Results

Main card
| Weight class | | | | Method | Round | Time | Notes |
|---|---|---|---|---|---|---|---|
| Lightweight | (Japan) Shinya Aoki (c) | def. | (Japan) Koji Ando | Decision (unanimous) | 5 | 5:00 | (Note: For the ONE Lightweight Championship) |
| Strawweight | (Thailand) Dejdamrong Sor Amnuaysirichoke | def. | (Philippines) Roy Doliguez | Technical Decision (unanimous) | 5 | 5:00 | (Note: For the inaugural ONE Strawweight Championship) |
| Featherweight | (Russia) Marat Gafurov | def. | (Malaysia) Ev Ting | Submission (rear-naked choke) | 1 | 4:30 | (Note: 1. 1 Contendership for the ONE Featherweight Championship) |
| Lightweight | (United States) Lowen Tynanes | def. | (Kazakhstan) Kuat Khamitov | Decision (unanimous) | 3 | 5:00 |
| Lightweight | (Costa Rica) Ariel Sexton | def. | (Hong Kong) Eddie Ng | Submission (rear-naked choke) | 2 | 1:10 |
| Featherweight | (Thailand) Shannon Wiratchai | def. | (Singapore) Amir Khan | Decision (split) | 3 | 5:00 |
| Women's Strawweight | (Canada) Angela Lee | def. | (Egypt) Aya Saeid Saber | Submission (armbar) | 1 | 1:43 |
Preliminary card
| Weight class | | | | Method | Round | Time | Notes |
| Bantamweight | (China) Alateng Heili | def. | (Singapore) Stephen Langdown | TKO (punches and soccer kicks) | 2 | 0:51 |
| Featherweight | (Singapore) Benedict Ang | def. | (Pakistan) Waqar Umar | Decision (unanimous) | 3 | 5:00 |
| Flyweight | (China) Yang Jianbing | def. | (Malaysia) Ali Yaakub | Submission (armbar) | 2 | 0:49 |

== ONE Championship: Dynasty of Champions (Guangzhou) ==
ONE Championship: Dynasty of Champions (Guangzhou)
- Promotion: ONE Championship
- Date: June 20, 2015
- Venue: Guangzhou Tianhe Gymnasium
- City: Guangzhou, China
- Attendance: 3,000

Event chronology
| ONE Championship: Warrior's Quest | ONE Championship: Dynasty of Champions (Guangzhou) | ONE Championship: Kingdom of Warriors |

ONE Championship: Dynasty of Champions (Guangzhou) (also known as ONE Championship 28) was a mixed martial arts event held by ONE Championship. The event was held on June 20, 2015 at the Guangzhou Tianhe Gymnasium in Guangzhou, China.

Background

ONE Championship made its second visit to China after the December 2014 event at Beijing.

Results

Main card
| Weight class | | | | Method | Round | Time | Notes |
|---|---|---|---|---|---|---|---|
| Featherweight | (Russia) Timofey Nastyukhin | def. | (Japan) Yusuke Kawanago | TKO (strikes) | 1 | 1:32 |
| Flyweight | (Brazil) Marcos Santana | def. | (Philippines) Ruel Catalan | Submission (guillotine choke) | 1 | 2:12 |
| Lightweight | (Brazil) Zorobabel Moreira | def. | (United Kingdom) Christian Holley | Submission (verbal tapout) | 1 | 0:14 |
| Flyweight | (China) Wu Ze | def. | (China) Yang Jianbing | Decision (split) | 3 | 5:00 | (Note: Chinese Flyweight Tournament Finale) |
| Featherweight | (China) Huang Di Yuan | def. | (China) Ma Jia Wen | Decision (unanimous) | 3 | 5:00 | (Note: Chinese Featherweight Tournament Finale) |
Guangzhou Flyweight Tournament
| Weight class | | | | Method | Round | Time | Notes |
| Flyweight | (China) Yang Jianbing | def. | (China) Wang Shuo | Decision (unanimous) | 3 | 5:00 | (Note: Chinese Flyweight Tournament Semi-Final) |
| Flyweight | (China) Wu Ze | def. | (China) Wu Hui Qiang | Submission (rear-naked choke) | 2 | 4:42 | (Note: Chinese Flyweight Tournament Semi-Final) |
| Flyweight | (China) Hu Rige | def. | (China) Zhao Xiao Tong | Submission (rear-naked choke) | 1 | 4:41 | (Note: Chinese Flyweight Tournament Alternate) |
Guangzhou Featherweight Tournament
| Weight class | | | | Method | Round | Time | Notes |
| Featherweight | (China) Ma Jia Wen | def. | (China) Biekemulati Nulijiao | TKO (strikes) | 2 | 2:06 | (Note: Chinese Featherweight Tournament Semi-Final) |
| Featherweight | (China) Huang Di Yuan | def. | (China) Tian Jian She | TKO (verbal submission) | 1 | 5:00 | (Note: Chinese Featherweight Tournament Semi-Final) |
| Featherweight | (China) Wang Yayong | def. | (China) Li Yun Long | TKO (referee stoppage) | 1 | 2:45 | (Note: Chinese Featherweight Tournament Alternate) |

== ONE Championship: Kingdom of Warriors ==
ONE Championship: Kingdom of Warriors
- Promotion: ONE Championship
- Date: July 18, 2015
- Venue: Thuwunna National Indoor Stadium
- City: Yangon, Myanmar
- Attendance: 4,600

Event chronology
| ONE Championship: Dynasty of Warriors (Guangzhou) | ONE Championship: Kingdom of Warriors | ONE Championship: Dynasty of Warriors (Shanghai) |

ONE Championship: Kingdom of Warriors (also known as ONE Championship 29) was a mixed martial arts event held by ONE Championship. The event was held on July 18, 2015 at the Thuwunna National Indoor Stadium in Yangon, Myanmar.

Background

ONE Championship made its debut in Myanmar holding the third title defense for ONE Bantamweight champion Bibiano Fernandes and the first Lethwei fight in the history of the promotion under traditional rules, knockout only to win. The fight showcased Burmese fighters Phyan Thway and Soe Htet Oo in a dark match and the result was a draw according to traditional Lethwei rules.

Results

Main card
| Weight class | | | | Method | Round | Time | Notes |
|---|---|---|---|---|---|---|---|
| Bantamweight | (Brazil) Bibiano Fernandes (c) | def. | (Finland) Toni Tauru | KO (punch) | 3 | 1:02 | (Note: For the ONE Bantamweight Championship) |
| Women's Atomweight | (Taiwan) Jenny Huang | def. | (Russia) Elena Pashnina | Decision (split) | 3 | 5;00 |
| Featherweight | (Myanmar) Tha Pyay Nyo | def. | (Myanmar) Myo Man Thit | TKO (punches) | 1 | 0:56 | (Note: Myanmar Featherweight Tournament Finale) |
| Lightweight | (Myanmar) Thway Thit Aung | def. | (Myanmar) Saw Ba Oo | KO (punch) | 1 | 2:25 | (Note: Myanmar Lightweight Tournament Finale) |
Myanmar Featherweight Tournament
| Weight class | | | | Method | Round | Time | Notes |
| Featherweight | (Myanmar) Tha Pyay Nyo | def. | (Myanmar) Htit Htit Lay | KO (punch) | 1 | 2:54 | (Note: Myanmar Featherweight Tournament Semi Final) |
| Featherweight | (Myanmar) Myo Man Thit | def. | (Myanmar) Min Htet Zaw | TKO (punches) | 1 | 4:43 | (Note: Myanmar Featherweight Tournament Semi Final) |
| Featherweight | (Myanmar) Phoe Thaw | def. | (Myanmar) Kyal Sin Htoo | TKO (cut) | 1 | 5:00 | (Note: Myanmar Featherweight Tournament Alternate) |
Myanmar Lightweight Tournament
| Weight class | | | | Method | Round | Time | Notes |
| Lightweight | (Myanmar) Thway Thit Aung | def. | (Myanmar) Saw Thae Oo | TKO (punches) | 1 | 0:52 | (Note: Myanmar Lightweight Tournament Semi Final) |
| Lightweight | (Myanmar) Saw Ba Oo | def. | (Myanmar) Dawna Aung | TKO (punches) | 1 | 4:03 | (Note: Myanmar Lightweight Tournament Semi Final) |
| Lightweight | (Myanmar) Saw Llay | def. | (Myanmar) Saw Hla Doe | Decision (unanimous) | 2 | 5:00 | (Note: Myanmar Lightweight Tournament Alternate) |
| Lightweight | (Myanmar) Phyan Thway | vs. | (Myanmar) Soe Htet Oo | Draw | 5 | 5:00 | (Note: Lethwei fight) |

== ONE Championship: Dynasty of Champions (Shanghai) (Cancelled) ==
ONE Championship: Dynasty of Champions (Shanghai)
- Promotion: ONE Championship
- Date: Cancelled
- Venue: Mercedes-Benz Arena
- City: Shanghai, China

Event chronology
| ONE Championship: Kingdom of Warriors | ONE Championship: Dynasty of Champions (Shanghai) | ONE Championship: Odyssey of Champions |

ONE Championship: Dynasty of Champions (Shanghai) was canceled. The event was going to be held on September 17, 2015 at the Mercedes-Benz Arena in Shanghai, China.

Background

ONE Championship makes its third event in China holding the first title defense for ONE Middleweight champion Igor Svirid. Initially scheduled for September 1, the event was officially cancelled due to public holidays in China. Some of the fights were rescheduled to the Jakarta Odyssey of Champions card.

Cancelled fight card

Main card
| Weight class | | | | Method | Round | Time | Notes |
|---|---|---|---|---|---|---|---|
| Middleweight | (Kazakhstan) Igor Svirid (c) | vs. | (Russia) Vitaly Bigdash | | | | (Note: For the ONE Middleweight Championship) |
| Lightweight | (United States) Roger Huerta | vs. | (Japan) Koji Ando |
| Flyweight | TBD | vs. | TBD | | | | (Note: Shanghai Flyweight Tournament Finale) |
| Featherweight | (South Korea) Kotetsu Boku | vs. | (United States) Major Overall |
| Bantamweight | (South Korea) Dae Hwan Kim | vs. | (Japan) Koetsu Okazaki |
| Women's Atomweight | (Russia) Elena Pashnina | vs. | (Canada) Angela Lee |
| Featherweight | (China) Jumayi Ayideng | vs. | (China) Teng LiGe |
Shanghai Flyweight Tournament
| Weight class | | | | Method | Round | Time | Notes |
| Flyweight | (China) Wang Yayong | vs. | (China) Li Gao Yang | | | | (Note: Shanghai Flyweight Tournament Semi Final) |
| Flyweight | (China) Hu Rige | vs. | (China) Liu Xiaoyang | | | | (Note: Shanghai Flyweight Tournament Semi Final) |
| Flyweight | (China) Yang Jianbing | vs. | (China) Wan Jianping | | | | (Note: Shanghai Flyweight Tournament Alternate) |

== ONE Championship: Odyssey of Champions ==
ONE Championship: Odyssey of Champions
- Promotion: ONE Championship
- Date: September 27, 2015
- Venue: Istora Senayan
- City: Jakarta, Indonesia
- Attendance: 2,500

Event chronology
| ONE Championship: Dynasty of Champions (Shanghai) [Cancelled] | ONE Championship: Odyssey of Champions | ONE Championship: Tigers of Asia |

ONE Championship: Odyssey of Champions (also known as ONE Championship 30) was a mixed martial arts event held by ONE Championship. The event was held on September 27, 2015 at the Istora Senayan in Jakarta, Indonesia.

Background

ONE Championship returns to Indonesia holding some fights of the cancelled Dynasty of Champions (Shanghai) card which were rescheduled. Initially this event was going to feature the first title defense for Featherweight Champion Jadamba Narantungalag, but it was cancelled due to visa issues. Marat Gafurov fought Martin Nguyen for the interim Featherweight Championship.

Results

Main card (RCTI)
| Weight class | | | | Method | Round | Time | Notes |
|---|---|---|---|---|---|---|---|
| Featherweight | (Russia) Marat Gafurov | def. | (Australia) Martin Nguyen | Submission (rear-naked choke) | 1 | 0:41 | (Note: For the interim ONE Featherweight Championship) |
| Bantamweight | (Indonesia) Sunoto Peringkat | def. | (Indonesia) Mario Satya Wirawan | Decision (unanimous) | 3 | 5:00 | (Note: For the Indonesian Warrior acknowledgement) |
| Catchweight (150 lb) | (Netherlands) Vincent Latoel | def. | (France) Arnaud Lepont | KO (kicks) | 2 | 0:15 |
Main card (MNC/RCTI)
| Weight class | | | | Method | Round | Time | Notes |
| Middleweight | (Russia) Aleksei Butorin | def. | (Brazil) Leandro Ataides | KO (kicks) | 2 | 3:18 |
| Lightweight | (Japan) Koji Ando | def. | (United States) Roger Huerta | Decision (unanimous) | 3 | 5:00 |
| Featherweight | (Brazil) Herbert Burns | def. | (Russia) Timofey Nastyukhin | Submission (rear-naked choke) | 1 | 3:26 |
Preliminary card (Facebook)
| Weight class | | | | Method | Round | Time | Notes |
| Bantamweight | (Russia) Yusup Saadulaev | def. | (Bulgaria) Sotir Kichukov | Submission (arm-triangle choke) | 2 | 1:10 |
| Bantamweight | (Tajikistan) Muin Gafurov | def. | (United States) Casey Suire | KO (punches and kicks) | 1 | 0:55 |
| Cruiserweight | (United States) Jake Butler | def. | (Brazil) Cristiano Kaminishi | Decision (unanimoous) | 3 | 5:00 |
| Women's Catchweight (120 lb) | (Canada) Angela Lee | def. | (Egypt) Mona Samir | Submission (rear-naked choke) | 1 | 3:41 |

== ONE Championship: Tigers of Asia ==
ONE Championship: Tigers of Asia
- Promotion: ONE Championship
- Date: October 9, 2015
- Venue: Putra Indoor Stadium
- City: Kuala Lumpur, Malaysia
- Attendance: 5,500

Event chronology
| ONE Championship: Odyssey of Champions | ONE Championship: Tigers of Asia | ONE Championship: Battle at The Gates |

ONE Championship: Tigers of Asia (also known as ONE Championship 31) was a mixed martial arts event held by ONE Championship. The event was held on October 9, 2015 at the Putra Indoor Stadium in Kuala Lumpur, Malaysia.

Background

ONE Championship returns to Malaysia holding the first title defense for Middleweight Champion Igor Svirid. Several fights initially scheduled for the Shanghai event were also rescheduled for this card.

Results

Main card
| Weight class | | | | Method | Round | Time | Notes |
|---|---|---|---|---|---|---|---|
| Middleweight | (Russia) Vitaly Bigdash | def. | (Kazakhstan) Igor Svirid (c) | TKO (strikes) | 2 | 0:36 | (Note: For the ONE Middleweight Championship) |
| Lightweight | (Australia) Adrian Pang | def. | (Malaysia) Peter Davis | TKO (strikes) | 1 | 0:48 |
| Catchweight (147 lb) | (Malaysia) Ev Ting | def. | (Philippines) Honorio Banario | Submission (guillotine choke) | 1 | 0:56 |
| Women's Flyweight | (Russia) Irina Mazepa | def. | (Malaysia) Ann Osman | KO (strikes) | 1 | 3:05 |
| Flyweight | (Malaysia) Gianni Subba | def. | (Brazil) Almiro Barros | Decision (unanimous) | 3 | 5:00 |
| Bantamweight | (South Korea) Dae Hwan Kim | def. | (China) Teng LiGe | Submission (rear-naked choke) | 2 | 4:08 |
| Flyweight | (Japan) Riku Shibuya | def. | (Philippines) Eugene Toquero | Decision (unanimous) | 3 | 5:00 |
| Featherweight | (Philippines) Eric Kelly | def. | (Japan) Hiroshige Tanaka | Decision (unanimous) | 3 | 5:00 |
| Featherweight | (Malaysia) Keanu Subba | def. | (France) Florian Garel | TKO (strikes) | 1 | 4:51 |
Preliminary card
| Weight class | | | | Method | Round | Time | Notes |
| Welterweight | (Malaysia) Agilan Thani | def. | (Egypt) Hisham Hiba | Submission (rear-naked choke) | 1 | 3:05 |
| Flyweight | (Malaysia) Saiful Merican | def. | (Malaysia) Melvin Yeoh | TKO (strikes) | 2 | 1:10 |

== ONE Championship: Pride of Lions ==
ONE Championship: Pride of Lions
- Promotion: ONE Championship
- Date: November 13, 2015
- Venue: Singapore Indoor Stadium
- City: Kallang, Singapore
- Attendance: 3,500

Event chronology
| ONE Championship: Tigers of Asia | ONE Championship: Pride of Lions | ONE Championship: Dynasty of Champions (Beijing II) |

ONE Championship: Pride of Lions (also known as ONE Championship 32) was a mixed martial arts event held by ONE Championship. The event was held on November 13, 2015 at the Singapore Indoor Stadium in Kallang, Singapore.

Background

ONE Championship returned to Singapore with the proposed long-awaited rematch between Ben Askren and Luis Santos for the ONE Welterweight Championship, together with the first title defense for Strawweight Champion Dejdamrong Sor Amnuaysirichoke.

Luis Santos ended up missing weight by 2 lb during the weight ins. Askren offered to fight Santos if he weighed in under 190 pounds by the next morning, but Santos refused. Ultimately the fight was cancelled.

Yago Bryan also missed weight, but Dejdamrong Sor Amnuaysirichoke agreed to fight a catchweight bout in a non-title fight.

Results

Main card
| Weight class | | | | Method | Round | Time | Notes |
|---|---|---|---|---|---|---|---|
| Strawweight | (Thailand) Dejdamrong Sor Amnuaysirichoke | def. | (Brazil) Yago Bryan | Decision (unanimous) | 5 | 5:00 | (Note: ONE Superfight; originally a title defense for Amnuaysirichoke, Yago Bryan missed weight) |
| Women's Strawweight | (Canada) Angela Lee | def. | (Philippines) Natalie Hills | Submission (twister) | 1 | 2:24 |
| Featherweight | (South Korea) Kotetsu Boku | def. | (United States) Major Overall | TKO (punch) | 2 | 1:19 |
| Heavyweight | (Hong Kong) Alain Ngalani | def. | (Ukraine) Igor Subora | TKO (punches) | 1 | 1:09 |
| Featherweight | (Singapore) Amir Khan | def. | (Philippines) Jimmy Yabo | Submission (strikes) | 1 | 4:18 |
| Featherweight | (Australia) Martin Nguyen | def. | (Philippines) Edward Kelly | TKO (doctor's stoppage) | 1 | 4:17 |
| Featherweight | (Singapore) Benedict Ang | def. | (Indonesia) Yohan Mulia Legowo | TKO (corner stoppage) | 2 | 5:00 |
| Featherweight | (China) Li Kai Wen | def. | (United States) Nathan Ng | KO (punches) | 1 | 4:52 |

== ONE Championship: Dynasty of Champions (Beijing II) ==
ONE Championship: Dynasty of Champions (Beijing II)
- Promotion: ONE Championship
- Date: November 21, 2015
- Venue: Olympic Sports Center Gymnasium
- City: Beijing, China

Event chronology
| ONE Championship: Pride of Lions | ONE Championship: Dynasty of Champions (Beijing II) | ONE Championship: Spirit of Champions |

ONE Championship: Dynasty of Champions (Beijing II) (also known as ONE Championship 33) was a mixed martial arts event held by ONE Championship. The event was held on November 21, 2015 at the Olympic Sports Center Gymnasium in Beijing, China.

Background

ONE Championship returns to China holding two title bouts, the unification for the ONE Featherweight Championship between Current Champion Jadamba Narantungalag and Interim Champion Marat Gafurov, and the second title defense for ONE Flyweight Champion Adriano Moraes.

Results

Main card
| Weight class | | | | Method | Round | Time | Notes |
|---|---|---|---|---|---|---|---|
| Featherweight | (China) Yang Sen | def. | (China) Zhang Jiacai | Submission (kimura) | 2 | 0:35 | (Note: Beijing Featherweight Tournament) |
| Featherweight | (Russia) Marat Gafurov (ic) | def. | (Mongolia) Jadamba Narantungalag (c) | Submission (rear-naked choke) | 4 | 4:39 | (Note: For the Unification of the ONE Featherweight Championship) |
| Flyweight | (Kazakhstan) Kairat Akhmetov | def. | (Brazil) Adriano Moraes (c) | Decision (split) | 5 | 5:00 | (Note: For the ONE Flyweight Championship) |
| Flyweight | (China) Li Wei Bin | def. | (China) Wang Yayong | Decision (split) | 3 | 5:00 |
| Welterweight | (Russia) Nikolay Aleksakhin | def. | (Mongolia) Burenzorig Batmunkh | Submission (rear-naked choke) | 3 | 4:39 |
| Welterweight | (Taiwan) Jeff Huang | def. | (Philippines) Trestle Tan | TKO (punches) | 1 | 1:30 |
Beijing Featherweight Tournament
| Weight class | | | | Method | Round | Time | Notes |
| Featherweight | (China) Zhang Jiacai | def. | (China) Cai Feilong | Submission | 1 | 3:42 | (Note: Beijing Featherweight Tournament) |
| Featherweight | (China) Yang Sen | def. | (China) Burigede Alateng | Decision (split) | 2 | 5:00 | (Note: Beijing Featherweight Tournament) |
| Featherweight | (China) Ma Jia Wen | def. | (China) Wang Ya Wei | Decision (unanimous) | 2 | 5:00 | (Note: Beijing Featherweight Tournament Reserve Bout) |

== ONE Championship: Kingdom of Khmer ==
ONE Championship: Kingdom of Khmer
- Promotion: ONE Championship
- Date: December 5, 2015
- Venue: Koh Pich Theatre
- City: Phnom Penh, Cambodia

Event chronology
| ONE Championship: Dynasty of Champions (Beijing II) | ONE Championship: Kingdom of Khmer | ONE Championship: Spirit of Champions |

ONE Championship: Kingdom of Khmer (also known as ONE Championship 34) was a mixed martial arts event held by ONE Championship. The event was held on December 5, 2015 at the Koh Pich Theatre in Phnom Penh, Cambodia.

Background

ONE Championship returns to Cambodia presenting more fights for the local crowd.

Results

Main card
| Weight class | | | | Method | Round | Time | Notes |
|---|---|---|---|---|---|---|---|
| Lightweight | (United States) Lowen Tynanes | def. | (Russia) Rasul Yakhyaev | Submission (rear-naked choke) | 3 | 1:43 |
| Flyweight | (Malaysia) Gianni Subba | def. | (Thailand) Anatpong Bunrad | Decision (split) | 3 | 5:00 |
| Bantamweight | (Cambodia) Chan Rothana | def. | (Cambodia) Sam Ang Dun | TKO (punches) | 1 | 4:30 |
| Bantamweight | (Indonesia) Mario Satya Wirawan | def. | (Cambodia) Chan Heng | KO (punch and soccer kick) | 1 | 0:06 |
| Bantamweight | (Cambodia) Meas Meu | def. | (Cambodia) Chan Samart | TKO (punches) | 1 | 1:14 |
| Flyweight | (Cambodia) Sim Bunsrun | def. | (Cambodia) Khun Sichan | Submission (armbar) | 1 | 4:55 |
| Women's Atomweight | (India) Jeet Toshi | def. | (Cambodia) Tharoth Sam | Decision (unanimous) | 3 | 5:00 |
| Featherweight | (Cambodia) Sor Sey | def. | (Cambodia) Chim Chetra | TKO (punches) | 2 | 1:12 |
| Featherweight | (Cambodia) Rin Saroth | def. | (Cambodia) Mission Ali | Submission (armbar) | 1 | 3:52 |
| Women's Flyweight | (Cambodia) Vy Srey Khouch | def. | (Cambodia) Eh Ya Nut | Decision (split) | 3 | 5:00 |

== ONE Championship: Spirit of Champions ==
ONE Championship: Spirit of Champions
- Promotion: ONE Championship
- Date: December 11, 2015
- Venue: Mall of Asia Arena
- City: Pasay, Philippines

Event chronology
| ONE Championship: Kingdom of Khmer | ONE Championship: Spirit of Champions | ONE Championship: Dynasty of Champions (Changsha) |

ONE Championship: Spirit of Champions (also known as ONE Championship 35) was a mixed martial arts event held by ONE Championship. The event was on December 11, 2015 at the Mall of Asia Arena in Pasay, Philippines.

Background

ONE Championship returns to the Philippines holding the inaugural contest for the ONE Heavyweight Championship between UFC veteran Brandon Vera and Paul Cheng. Vera was supposed to fight against Chi Lewis-Perry but the latter failed to submit his medical and drug test records.

Yang Jian Bing was supposed to fight fellow Flyweight Geje Eustaquio but he failed to cut weight and was rushed to a nearby hospital due to dehydration and possible heat stroke. Bing was later announced dead on the fight day itself.

Results

Main card
| Weight class | | | | Method | Round | Time | Notes |
|---|---|---|---|---|---|---|---|
| Heavyweight | (United States) Brandon Vera | def. | (Taiwan) Paul Cheng | KO (punch and head kick) | 1 | 0:26 | (Note: For the inaugural ONE Heavyweight Championship) |
| Bantamweight | (Australia) Reece McLaren | def. | (Philippines) Mark Striegl | Submission (rear-naked choke) | 3 | 3:33 |
| Flyweight | (Philippines) Eugene Toquero | def. | (China) Li Wei Bin | TKO (corner stoppage) | 2 | 5:00 |
| Women's Flyweight | (Russia) Irina Mazepa | def. | (Philippines) Ana Julaton | Decision (unanimous) | 3 | 5:00 |
| Women's Strawweight | (Canada) Angela Lee | def. | (Poland) Lena Tkhorevska | Submission (rear-naked choke) | 2 | 3:26 |
| Featherweight | (Brazil) Bruno Pucci | def. | (Netherlands) Anthony Engelen | Submission (rear-naked choke) | 2 | 2:19 |
| Flyweight | (Brazil) Alex Silva | def. | (Philippines) Ruel Catalan | Submission (kneebar) | 1 | 3:53 |
| Featherweight | (Canada) Christian Lee | def. | (Australia) David Meak | TKO (punches) | 1 | 0:29 |

== See also ==
- 2015 in UFC
- Bellator MMA in 2015
- 2015 in Rizin Fighting Federation
- 2015 in Absolute Championship Berkut
- 2015 in Road FC
- 2015 in Kunlun Fight
