= Seina =

Seina may refer to:

- Seina (kickboxer) (聖愛; born 2001), Japanese professional kickboxer
- Seina Fukuoka (福岡 聖菜; born 2000), Japanese member of idol group AKB48
- Seina Imamura (今村 聖奈; born 2003), Japanese jockey
- Seina Koyama (小山 星流), Japanese member of idol group Up Up Girls Kakko Kari
- Seina Nakajima (中嶋 星奈; born 1997), Japanese curler
- Seina Saito (齋藤 聖奈; born 1992), Japanese rugby union and rugby sevens player
- Seina Shimabukuro (島袋 聖南; born 1987), Japanese model and reality television contestant

== See also ==
- Marycha (Lithuanian: Seina), a river on the Polish–Lithuanian and Lithuanian–Belarusian borders
