= Manazo Kobayashi =

Japanese kickboxer

- Born: Manami Kobayashi 小林愛実; 18 February 1996 (age 30); Tokyo, Japan
- Nickname: Dynamite Girl
- Height: 1.58 m (5 ft 2 in)
- Weight: 52 kg (115 lb; 8 st 3 lb)
- Style: Kickboxing; Muay thai
- Stance: Orthodox
- Fighting out of: Tokyo, Japan
- Team: NEXT LEVEL Shibuya
- Years active: 2015-present

Kickboxing record
- Total: 32
- Wins: 19
- By knockout: 3
- Losses: 9
- By knockout: 1
- Draws: 4

Manazo Kobayashi (小林愛三) (born 18 February 1996) is a retired Japanese kickboxer and Nak Muay. She is the former RISE and WPMF World Flyweight champion.

As of May 2021, Combat Press ranks her as the tenth best female kickboxer in the world.

== Biography ==
=== Early career ===
Manazo was born in Tokyo on February 2, 1996. She practiced volleyball throughout middle school, she discovered kickboxing as she was attending a high school dedicated to sports career.

Manazo made her professional debut on December 6, 2016. She defeated Yuri Kano by unanimous decision at The Battle of Muaythai 10.

On February 7, 2016 Manazo made waves and gained recognition when she defeated Muay Thai phenom Phetjee Jaa Or.Meekun for her second professional fight.

Kobayashi's next two fights against Miki Kitamura and Hongkao Mor.Rachaptchonbun went to a decision, after which she notched a victory over Meiji Banpitunluanpitong. Her five fight undefeated streak earned her the chance to fight Pokeaw Sor-Por-Lor Udon for the inaugural MuayThaiOpen Flyweight title. She won the fight by a first round knockout.

Kobayashi fought with MuayThaiOpen once more at MuayThaiOpen 38, when she was scheduled to fight Midori Kato. She won the fight by unanimous decision.

=== KNOCK OUT ===
In May 2017, Kobayashi had her first fight with KNOCK OUT, being scheduled to fight Haru Tajima at Road To KNOCK OUT.1. The fight ended in a draw. Kobayashi fought at the next Road To KNOCK OUT event as well, being scheduled to face Union Akari. The fight once again ended in a draw.

Following these two draws, Kobayashi was scheduled to fight a rematch with Haru Tajima at ROAD TO KNOCK OUT vol.5. Kobayashi won the fight by unanimous decision.

Kobayashi won her next three fights against Baifaingan Klayasortorn, Kai Ting Chuang and Do Kyung Lee, after which she decided to participate in the 2018 SHOOT BOXING 2018 Girls S-cup tournament. Kobayashi was scheduled to fight Jleana Valentino in the quarterfinals. Valentino won the fight by decision.

She returned to KNOCK OUT to fight Miki Kitamura at KNOCK OUT 2018 OSAKA 2nd. Kobayashi won the fight by decision. In her next fight, Kobayashi fought Saya Ito, once against winning by decision. Kobayashi fought a rematch with Jleana Valentino at KNOCK OUT 2019 SPRING, beating Valentino by unanimous decision.

On November 17, 2019, Kobayashi was scheduled to fight Tananchanok Kaewsamrit for the WPMF World Flyweight title. Kobayashi beat Tananchanok by a split decision.

=== RISE ===
Kobayashi signed with RISE in 2020 and was set to make her debut against Willa Saklek at RISE 140. Sakled would later withdraw following a knee injury, and was replaced by MARI. Kobayashi won the fight by a dominant unanimous decision.

Kobayashi next fought KOKOZ at RISE GIRLS POWER 3, once again winning by unanimous decision. She extended her winning streak to a career best of six with a unanimous decision over Maki Goto.

==== RISE Flyweight title reign ====
Kobayashi was scheduled to fight the former J-GIRLS and WPMF Japan Bantamweight champion Madoka Jinnai at RISE 144, for the inaugural RISE Women's Flyweight title. However, Jinnai later withdrew due to an injury. RISE would subsequently promote Kobayashi to regular champion status. Kobayashi was rescheduled to fight Suzuka Tabuchi in a non-title match. Tabuchi won the fight by a majority decision.

As Tabuchi beat Kobayashi in a non-title match, the two of them were immediately scheduled to fight a rematch with the title on the line. Kobayashi was more successful in the rematch, managing to defend her title through a unanimous decision victory.

Kobayashi was scheduled to fight the RISE Mini Flyweight champion Hinata Terayama, in a 49.5 kg catchweight bout, at RISE GIRLS POWER 5. She lost the fight by majority decision, with scores of 30-29, 30-29 and 29-29.

Kobayashi was scheduled to challenge the reigning Glory Women's Super Bantamweight champion Tiffany van Soest at Glory 80 on March 19, 2022. She lost the fight by a fifth-round technical knockout.

Kobayashi faced Do Kyung Lee in a rematch at RISE 160 on July 29, 2022. The non-title bout was a rematch of their April 14, 2018 meeting, which Kobayashi won by unanimous decision. She won the rematch by unanimous decision, as well, with all three judges scoring the bout 30-26 in her favor.

Kobayashi faced the Enfusion Women's Strawweight champion Tessa de Kom in a non-title bout at RISE WORLD SERIES / SHOOTBOXING-KINGS on December 25, 2022. She lost the fight by unanimous decision, with scores of 30-29, 29-28 and 29-28.

Kobayashi made her second RISE title defense against Tessa de Kom at RISE 168 on May 28, 2023. She lost the fight by unanimous decision, with scores of 50–47, 49–47 and 49–48.

==== Later RISE career ====
Kobayashi faced Melty Kira at RISE 171 on August 18, 2023. She won the fight by unanimous decision.

Kobayashi faced Arina Kobayashi in an open finger gloves bout at RISE 178 on May 19, 2024. She lost the fight by unanimous decision after being scored a knockdown in the second round.

Kobayashi faced KOKOZ at RISE 186 on February 23, 2025. She won the fight by unanimous decision.

Kobayashi challenged Tessa de Kom for the RISE Flyweight title at RISE 189 on June 29, 2025. She lost the fight by unanimous decision.

Kobayashi announced her retirement from fighting at RISE 201 on August 29, 2026.

== Championships and accomplishments ==
- RISE
  - 2020 RISE Women's Flyweight (-52 kg) Champion
    - One successful defense
- World Professional Muaythai Federation
  - 2019 WPMF World Flyweight Champion
- MuayThaiOpen
  - 2016 MuayThai Open Flyweight Champion

== Fight record ==
Professional record
19 Wins (3 KO's), 9 Losses, 4 Draws
Date	Result	Opponent	Event	Location	Method	Round	Time
2025-06-29	Loss	(Netherlands) Tessa De Kom	RISE 189	Tokyo, Japan	Decision (Unanimous)	5	3:00
For the RISE Women's Flyweight (-52 kg) title.
2025-02-23	Win	(Japan) KOKOZ	RISE 186	Tokyo, Japan	Decision (Unanimous)	3	3:00
2024-05-19	Loss	(Japan) Arina Kobayashi	RISE 178	Tokyo, Japan	Decision (Unanimous)	3	3:00
2023-08-18	Win	(Japan) Melty Kira	RISE 171	Tokyo, Japan	Decision (Unanimous)	3	3:00
2023-05-28	Loss	(Netherlands) Tessa de Kom	RISE 168	Tokyo, Japan	Decision (Unanimous)	5	3:00
Loses the RISE Women's Flyweight (-52 kg) title.
2022-12-25	Loss	(Netherlands) Tessa de Kom	RISE WORLD SERIES / Glory Rivals 4	Tokyo, Japan	Decision (Unanimous)	3	3:00
2022-07-29	Win	(Korea) Do Kyung Lee	RISE 160	Tokyo, Japan	Decision (Unanimous)	3	3:00
2022-03-19	Loss	(United States) Tiffany van Soest	Glory 80	Hasselt, Belgium	TKO (Spinning back kick)	5	2:56
For the Glory Women's Super Bantamweight Championship.
2021-09-12	Loss	(Japan) Hinata Terayama	RISE GIRLS POWER 5	Tokyo, Japan	Decision (Majority)	3	3:00
2021-04-17	Win	(Japan) Suzuka Tabuchi	RISE 148	Tokyo, Japan	Decision (Unanimous)	5	3:00
Defends RISE Women's Flyweight (-52 kg) title.
2020-12-18	Loss	(Japan) Suzuka Tabuchi	RISE 144	Tokyo, Japan	Decision (Majority)	3	3:00
2020-10-29	Win	(Japan) Maki Goto	NO KICK NO LIFE ~Shin Shou~ Diamond FES	Tokyo, Japan	Decision (Unanimous)	3	3:00
2020-09-20	Win	(Japan) KOKOZ	RISE GIRLS POWER 3	Tokyo, Japan	Decision (Unanimous)	3	3:00
2020-07-19	Win	(Japan) MARI	RISE 140	Tokyo, Japan	Decision (Unanimous)	3	3:00
2019-11-17	Win	(Thailand) Tananchanok Kaewsamrit	JAPAN KICKBOXING INNOVATION 6	Okayama, Japan	Decision (Split)	5	2:00
Wins WPMF World Flyweight title.
2019-07-05	Loss	(Japan) Reina Sato	RISE 133	Tokyo, Japan	lose by default	-	-
2019-04-29	Win	(Italy) Jleana Valentino	KNOCK OUT 2019 SPRING	Tokyo, Japan	Decision (Unanimous)	5	3:00
2018-12-09	Win	(Japan) Saya Ito	KING OF KNOCK OUT 2018	Tokyo, Japan	Decision (Unanimous)	5	2:00
2018-09-08	Win	(Japan) Miki Kitamura	KNOCK OUT 2018 OSAKA 2nd	Osaka, Japan	Decision (Unanimous)	3	3:00
2018-07-06	Loss	(Italy) Jleana Valentino	SHOOT BOXING 2018 Girls S-cup -48 kg World Tournament, Quarter Final	Tokyo, Japan	Decision (Unanimous)	3	3:00
2018-04-14	Win	(Korea) Do Kyung Lee	KNOCK OUT Sakura Burst	Kawasaki, Japan	Decision (Unanimous)	3	3:00
2018-02-12	Win	(Taiwan) Kai Ting Chuang	KNOCK OUT FIRST IMPACT	Tokyo, Japan	Decision (Majority)	5	3:00
2017-11-26	Win	(Thailand) Baifaingan Klayasortorn	MuayThaiOpen 40	Tokyo, Japan	KO	2	
2017-10-04	Win	(Japan) Haru Tajima	ROAD TO KNOCK OUT vol.5	Tokyo, Japan	Decision (Unanimous)	3	3:00
2017-07-20	Draw	(Japan) Union Akari	Road To KNOCK OUT.2	Tokyo, Japan	Decision (Split)	3	3:00
2017-05-10	Draw	(Japan) Haru Tajima	Road To KNOCK OUT.1	Tokyo, Japan	Decision (Split)	3	3:00
2017-04-02	Win	(Japan) Midori Kato	MuayThaiOpen 38	Tokyo, Japan	Decision (Unanimous)	3	2:00
2016-12-25	Win	(Thailand) Pokeaw Sor-Por-Lor Udon	MuayThaiOpen 37	Tokyo, Japan	KO (Knees)	1	1:06
Wins inaugural MuayThaiOpen Flyweight title.
2016-10-02	Win	(Thailand) Meiji Banpitunluanpitong	MuayThaiOpen 36	Tokyo, Japan	KO (Spinning Elbow)	2	1:11
2016-07-17	Draw	(Thailand) Hongkao Mor.Rachaptchonbun	MuayThaiOpen 35	Tokyo, Japan	Decision (Unanimous)	3	3:00
2016-05-29	Draw	(Japan) Miki Kitamura	J-NETWORK J-FIGHT＆J-GIRLS 2016 2nd	Tokyo, Japan	Decision (Majority)	3	3:00
2016-02-07	Win	(Thailand) Phetjee Jaa Or.Meekun	MuayThaiOpen 34	Tokyo, Japan	Decision (Majority)	5	2:00
2015-12-06	Win	(Japan) Yuri Kano	BOM The Battle of Muaythai 10	Yokohama, Japan	Decision (Unanimous)	3	2:00
Legend: Win Loss Draw/No contest Notes

Amateur record
Date	Result	Opponent	Event	Location	Method	Round	Time
2015-08-02	Win	(Japan) Nana Okuwaki	Muay Thai Super Fight Amateur vol.2 - Suk Wan Kingtong	Tokyo, Japan	Decision (Unanimous)	2	2:00
2015-08-02	Win	(Japan) Akane Tamaru	Muay Thai Super Fight Amateur vol.2 - Suk Wan Kingtong	Tokyo, Japan	Decision (Unanimous)	2	2:00
2015-07-19	Loss	(Japan) Miiri Sasaki	The Battle of Muay Thai Amateur 12	Yokohama, Japan	Decision	2	1:30
2015-04-05	Win	(Japan) Ayano Namegawa	The Battle of Muay Thai Amateur 10	Tokyo, Japan	Decision	2	1:30
Legend: Win Loss Draw/No contest Notes

== See also ==
- List of female kickboxers
