= Han Zihao =

Chinese Muay Thai fighter

- Born: August 15, 1995 (age 31); Zhengzhou, China
- Nationality: Chinese
- Height: 176 cm (5 ft 9 1/2 in)
- Weight: 65 kg (143 lb; 10.2 st)
- Style: Muay Thai
- Stance: Orthodox
- Fighting out of: Bangkok, Thailand
- Team: MAD Muay Thai Gym; Sor.Dechaphan

Kickboxing record
- Total: 92
- Wins: 61
- By knockout: 23
- Losses: 27
- Draws: 4

Han Zihao (Chinese: 韩子豪) is a Chinese Muay Thai fighter. Han previously challenged Nong-O Gaiyanghadao for the ONE Bantamweight Muay Thai World Championship.

== Biography and career ==
Han started martial arts in China with Sanda and the Muay Thai. At 14 years old he moved to Thailand to get better training.

=== ONE Championship ===
On July 27, 2018, Han made his ONE Championship debut against Panicos Yusuf at ONE Championship: Reign of Kings, losing by unanimous decision.

He picked up his first promotional win with a unanimous decision over Stergos Mikkios at ONE Championship: Beyond The Horizon on September 8, 2018.

On October 26, 2018, Han defeated Ryan Jakiri by first-round knockout at ONE Championship: Pursuit of Greatness.

He extended his ONE winning streak to three with a first-round technical knockout victory over Azwan Che Wil at ONE Championship: Conquest of Champions on November 23, 2018.

On February 16, 2019, Han Zihao faced Nong-O Gaiyanghadao for the inaugural ONE Bantamweight Muay Thai World Championship. He lost the fight by unanimous decision after five rounds.

He bounced back with a second-round knockout over Andrew Miller at ONE Championship: Legendary Quest on June 15, 2019.

On November 8, 2019, he lost to Kongsak Saenchaimuaythaigym by unanimous decision at ONE Championship: Masters of Fate.

On January 10, 2020, he lost to Mehdi Zatout by split decision at ONE Championship: A New Tomorrow.

Han faced Mohammed Bin Mahmoud at ONE: Reign of Dynasties 2 on October 17, 2020. He won the fight via knockout in the third round.

Han was scheduled to face Adam Noi at ONE: Unbreakable 3 on January 22, 2021. However, the bout was postponed to take place at ONE: Fists of Fury 2 on February 26, 2021. He won the fight via unanimous decision.

Han faced Ferrari Fairtex at ONE 161 on September 29, 2022. At the weigh-ins, Han Zihao weighed in at 153.75 lb, 8.75 lb over the bantamweight non-title fight limit of 145 pounds. the bout agreed to moved to the featherweight division (145–155 lbs) where Han was fined 30%, which went to Ferrari Fairtex. He lost the bout via unanimous decision.

Han faced Asa Ten Pow on April 22, 2023, at ONE Fight Night 9. At weigh-ins, Zihao weighed in at 149.5 lbs, 4.5 lbs over the Bantamweight limit, and Asa Ten Pow, coming in at 145.25 lbs or .5 lbs over the limit, missed weight and their bout was renegotiated as a catchweight at 149.5 lbs. He lost the bout in the third round via TKO stoppage.

Han faced Shinji Suzuki on March 1, 2024, at ONE 166. He lost the bout via unanimous decision.

== Titles and accomplishments ==
- 2013 China Muay Thai Champion
- Thailand TV3 Champion

== Fight record ==
Muay Thai and Kickboxing record
61 Wins (23 (T)KO's), 27 Losses, 4 Draws
Date	Result	Opponent	Event	Location	Method	Round	Time
2024-03-01	Loss	(Japan) Shinji Suzuki	ONE 166	Lusail, Qatar	Decision (Unanimous)	3	3:00
2023-04-22	Loss	(United States) Asa Ten Pow	ONE Fight Night 9	Bangkok, Thailand	TKO (Punches)	3	0:52
2022-09-29	Loss	(Thailand) Ferrari Fairtex	ONE 161	Kallang, Singapore	Decision (Unanimous)	3	3:00
2021-11-12	Win	(France) Victor Pinto	ONE: NextGen II	Kallang, Singapore	Decision (Unanimous)	3	3:00
2021-02-26	Win	(Algeria) Adam Noi	ONE: Fists Of Fury 2	Kallang, Singapore	Decision (Unanimous)	3	3:00
2020-10-17	Win	(Malaysia) Mohammed Bin Mahmoud	ONE: Reign of Dynasties 2	Kallang, Singapore	KO (Punch)	3	0:49
2020-01-10	Loss	(France) Mehdi Zatout	ONE: A New Tomorrow	Bangkok, Thailand	Decision (Split)	3	3:00
2019-11-08	Loss	(Thailand) Kongsak Saenchaimuaythaigym	ONE: Masters of Fate	Pasay, Philippines	Decision (Unanimous)	3	3:00
2019-06-15	Win	(Scotland) Andrew Miller	ONE: Legendary Quest	Shanghai, China	KO (Punches)	2	2:36
2019-02-16	Loss	(Thailand) Nong-O Gaiyanghadaogym	ONE: Clash of Legends	Bangkok, Thailand	Decision (Unanimous)	5	3:00
For the inaugural ONE Bantamweight Muay Thai World Championship.
2018-11-23	Win	(Malaysia) Azwan Che Wil	ONE: Conquest of Champions	Pasay, Philippines	TKO (Injury)	1	2:52
2018-10-26	Win	(Philippines) Ryan Jakiri	ONE: Pursuit of Greatness	Yangon, Myanmar	KO (Punch)	1	1:39
2018-09-08	Win	(Greece) Stergos Mikkios	ONE: Beyond The Horizon	Shanghai, China	Decision (Unanimous)	3	3:00
2018-07-27	Loss	(Cyprus) Panicos Yusuf	ONE: Reign of Kings	Pasay, Philippines	Decision (Unanimous)	3	3:00
2018-06-16	Loss	(France) Rafi Bohic	Topking World Series	Surat Thani, Thailand	Decision	5	3:00
2018-03-17	Loss	(Thailand) Yodpanomrung Jitmuangnon	Top King World Series	Thailand	Decision	3	3:00
2018-02-10	Win	(Thailand) Petchboonchuay FA Group	Top King World Series	China	KO	3	
2017-11-18	Win	(France) Emerick Soekardjan	EM Legend 25	China	KO (Left high kick)	1	
2017-10-25	Win	(Japan) Shunsuke Miyabi	Emei Legend 24	China	KO	3	1:38
2017-09-30	Loss	(Thailand) Sangmanee Sor Tienpo	Top King World Series - TK16	Fuzhou, China	Decision	3	3:00
2017-08-05	Loss	(Thailand) Muangthai PKSaenchaimuaythaigym	Topking World Series	Thailand	Decision	3	3:00
2017-06-10	Win	(Japan) Shogo Kuriaki	Kunlun Fight 62	Bangkok, Thailand	KO	2	
2017-02-07	Win	(France) Najib Djellodi	Emei Legend	China	Decision	3	3:00
2017-01-14	Draw	(Thailand) Sangmanee Sor Tienpo	Top King World Series - TK12 Hohhot	Hohhot, China	Draw	3	3:00
2016-12-27	Win	(Thailand) Jakkrit	Emei Legend	China	TKO	2	3:00
2016-10-15	Win	(Uzbekistan) Firdvas Boynazarov	THAI FIGHT Chengdu	China	TKO	2	
2016-09-13	Win	(Japan) Hiroki Tanaka	EM Legend	Thailand	TKO		
2016-07-23	Loss	(France) Victor Pinto	THAI FIGHT Proud to Be Thai	Thailand	Decision (unanimous)	5	3:00
2016-07-10	Loss	(Thailand) Rungravee Sasiprapa	Top King World Series	China	Decision (unanimous)	3	3:00
2016-05-31	Loss	(Ukraine) Alexandr	EM Legend	China	Decision	3	3:00
2016-03-20	Loss	(Thailand) Kwangrun	Super Muay Thai	Thailand	Decision	3	3:00
2016-03-12	Loss	(Thailand) Payak Samui Lukjaoporongtom Kromsappasamit	THAI FIGHT	Bangkok, Thailand	Decision (unanimous)	3	3:00
2015-12-22	Loss	(France) Gregoire Gottardi	Emei Legend	China	Decision	3	3:00
2015-12-12	Win	(China) Bang Pei	Taishan Decision	Yantai, China			
2015-10-11	Win	(Thailand) Sangpanom Por.Petchaikaew	Max Muay Thai	Bangkok, Thailand			
2015-09	Win	(Russia)		Thailand			
2015-08-30	Win	(Thailand) Dechsanit Sor Sor Nawath	Max Muay Thai	Bangkok, Thailand			
Legend: Win Loss Draw/No contest Notes
