= Priscilla Hertati Lumban Gaol =

Indonesian martial artist

Priscilla Hertarti Lumban Gaol
- Born: May 16, 1988 (age 38); Dolok Sanggul, North Sumatra, Indonesia
- Other names: Thathi
- Nationality: Indonesian
- Height: 155 cm (5 ft 1 in)
- Weight: 52 kg (115 lb; 8 st 3 lb)
- Division: Atomweight
- Style: Sanda
- Team: Siam Training Camp

Mixed martial arts record
- Total: 12
- Wins: 7
- By knockout: 1
- By submission: 2
- By decision: 4
- Losses: 5
- By knockout: 2
- By decision: 3

Other information
- Mixed martial arts record from Sherdog

Priscilla Hertati Lumban Gaol (born May 16, 1988) is an Indonesian martial artist who has represented the country in various international competitions, including in the 2014 Asian Games, where she competed in wushu, and in the 2019 SEA Games, where she competed in kickboxing.

She signed a contract with ONE Championship and made her debut in February 2017. She competes in the women’s atomweight division and is known by her nickname "Thathi".

== Early life ==
Lumban Gaol was born in Dolok Sanggul, North Sumatra, to ethnic Batak parents W. Lumban Gaol and Rebecca Manullang. She is the second child of six siblings. She currently lives in Jakarta.

Lumban Gaol started to learn martial arts in 2006, when her older brother introduced her to wushu. Her parents initially refused to allow her to pursue a career in martial arts and demanded she be an office worker.

== Martial arts career ==
=== Early career ===
Lumban Gaol first competed in wushu sanda in the 2008 Indonesia National Games. At the 2012 Indonesia National Games, she won a bronze medal in wushu.

She won a bronze medal in the 2013 Wushu World Championships' women 52 kg category in Kuala Lumpur, Malaysia.

She won the national kickboxing championships back to back in 2018 and 2019 to secure her place in the national team for the 2019 SEA Games.

=== ONE Championship ===
She suffered losses in her first two professional matches in the promotion and earned her first win in January 2018 in Jakarta when she fought against Audreylaura Boniface Raphael of Malaysia at One Championship: Kings Of Courage. She went to win a total of five bouts that year out of six fights she had, which made her the busiest athlete of the year.

She has collected seven wins throughout her stint in the promotion, with most recently, she defeated Bozhena Antoniyar via a unanimous decision in Jakarta. After the bout, Gaol said she was looking towards the possibility of challenging Angela Lee's ONE Atomweight Championship belt.

== Gym affiliation ==
Lumban Gaol represents Siam Training Camp

== Personal life ==
After stepping away from competition, Lumban Gaol married Teguh Wartana on August 8, 2020. They have two children together.

== Mixed martial arts record ==
Professional record breakdown
12 matches	7 wins	5 losses
By knockout	1	2
By submission	2	0
By decision	4	3

Res.	Record	Opponent	Method	Event	Date	Round	Time	Location	Notes
Loss	7–5	Meng Bo	KO (punches)	ONE: Inside the Matrix 2	November 6, 2020	1	1:26	Kallang, Singapore	
Win	7–4	Bozhena Antoniyar	Decision (unanimous)	ONE: Dawn of Valor	October 25, 2019	3	5:00	Jakarta, Indonesia	
Win	6–4	Nou Srey Pov	Decision (unanimous)	ONE: For Honor	May 3, 2019	3	5:00	Jakarta, Indonesia	
Loss	5–4	Puja Tomar	Decision (split)	ONE: Eternal Glory	January 19, 2019	3	5:00	Jakarta, Indonesia	
Win	5–3	Angelie Sabanal	Decision (unanimous)	ONE: Warrior's Dream	November 17, 2018	3	5:00	Jakarta, Indonesia	
Win	4–3	Jomary Torres	Decision (unanimous)	ONE: Conquest of Heroes	September 22, 2018	3	5:00	Jakarta, Indonesia	
Loss	3–3	Jihin Radzuan	Decision (unanimous)	ONE: Pursuit of Power	July 13, 2018	3	5:00	Kuala Lumpur, Malaysia	
Win	3–2	Rome Trinidad	Submission (guillotine choke)	ONE: Grit & Glory	May 12, 2018	1	2:27	Jakarta, Indonesia	
Win	2–2	Krisna Limbaga	Submission (scarf hold armlock)	ONE: Quest for Gold	February 23, 2018	1	4:05	Yangon, Myanmar	
Win	1–2	Audreylaura Boniface Raphaeil	TKO (punches)	ONE: Kings of Courage	January 20, 2018	1	3:23	Jakarta, Indonesia	Flyweight bout.
Loss	0–2	Gina Iniong	TKO (punches)	ONE: Legends of the World	November 10, 2017	2	2:12	Pasay, Philippines	Strawweight debut.
Loss	0–1	Tiffany Teo	Decision (unanimous)	ONE: Throne of Tigers	February 10, 2017	3	5:00	Kuala Lumpur, Malaysia	Flyweight debut.

== See also ==
- List of female mixed martial artists
