= 2018 in ONE Championship =

Mixed martial arts events

Information
- First date: January 20, 2018
- Last date: December 7, 2018

Events
- Total events: 24

Fights
- Total fights: 271
- Title fights: 22

The year 2018 was the 8th year in the history of the ONE Championship, a mixed martial arts, kickboxing and Muay Thai promotion based in Singapore.

== List of events ==
ONE Championship
No.	Event	Date	Venue	Location
1	ONE Championship: Kings of Courage	January 20, 2018	Jakarta Convention Center	Jakarta, Indonesia
2	ONE Championship: Global Superheroes	January 26, 2018	Mall of Asia Arena	Manila, Philippines
3	ONE Championship: Quest for Gold	February 23, 2018	Thuwunna Indoor Stadium	Yangon, Myanmar
4	ONE Championship 69: Visions of Victory	March 9, 2018	Axiata Arena	Kuala Lumpur, Malaysia
5	ONE Championship: Iron Will	March 24, 2018	Impact Arena	Bangkok, Thailand
6	ONE Championship: Heroes of Honor	April 20, 2018	Mall of Asia Arena	Manila, Philippines
7	ONE Championship: Grit and Glory	May 12, 2018	Jakarta Convention Center	Jakarta, Indonesia
8	ONE Championship: Unstoppable Dreams	May 18, 2018	Singapore Indoor Stadium	Kallang, Singapore
-	ONE Championship: Battle for the Heavens (Cancelled)	May 26, 2018	Shanghai Oriental Sports Center	Shanghai, China
9	ONE Championship: Pinnacle of Power	June 23, 2018	Jakarta Convention Center	Jakarta, Indonesia
10	ONE: Spirit of a Warrior	June 29, 2018	Thuwunna Stadium	Yangon, Myanmar
11	ONE Championship: Battle for the Heavens	July 7, 2019	Tianhe Gymnasium	Guangzhou, China
12	ONE: Pursuit of Power	July 13, 2018	Axiata Arena	Kuala Lumpur, Malaysia
13	ONE Championship: Reign of Kings	July 27, 2018	Mall of Asia Arena	Manila, Philippines
14	ONE: Beyond the Horizon	September 8, 2018	Baoshan Arena	Baoshan, China
15	ONE Championship: Conquest of Heroes	September 22, 2018	Jakarta Convention Center	Jakarta, Indonesia
16	ONE Championship: Kingdom of Heroes	October 6, 2018	Impact Arena	Bangkok, Thailand
17	ONE Championship: Pursuit of Greatness	October 26, 2018	Thuwunna Stadium	Yangon, Myanmar
18	ONE Championship: Heart of the Lion	November 9, 2018	Singapore Indoor Stadium	Kallang, Singapore
19	ONE Championship: Warrior's Dream	November 17, 2018	Istora Senayan	Jakarta, Indonesia
20	ONE Championship: Conquest of Champions	November 23, 2018	Mall of Asia Arena	Manila, Philippines
21	ONE Championship: Destiny of Champions	December 7, 2018	Axiata Arena	Kuala Lumpur, Malaysia

== Title fights ==
Title fights in 2018
Weight class				Method	Round	Time	Event	Notes
Women's Strawweight	Xiong Jing Nan	def.	Tiffany Teo	TKO (punches)	4	2:17	ONE: Kings of Courage	(Note: For the inaugural ONE Women's Strawweight World Championship.)
Flyweight	Geje Eustaquio	def.	Kairat Akhmetov	Decision (unanimous)	5	5:00	ONE: Global Superheroes	(Note: For the interim ONE Flyweight World Championship.)
Light Heavyweight	Aung La Nsang	def.	Alexandre Machado	TKO (head kick and punches)	1	0:54	ONE: Quest for Gold	(Note: For the vacant ONE Light Heavyweight World Championship.)
Bantamweight	Bibiano Fernandes (c)	def.	Martin Nguyen	Decision (unanimous)	5	5:00	ONE: Iron Will	(Note: For the ONE Bantamweight World Championship.)
Strawweight	Yoshitaka Naito	def.	Alex Silva (c)	Decision (split)	5	5:00	ONE: Grit and Glory	(Note: For the ONE Strawweight World Championship.)
Featherweight	Martin Nguyen (c)	def.	Christian Lee	Decision (split)	5	5:00	ONE: Unstoppable Dreams	(Note: For the ONE Featherweight World Championship.)
Flyweight Muay Thai	Sam-A Gaiyanghadao	def.	Sergio Wielzen	KO (elbows)	4	2:47	ONE: Unstoppable Dreams	(Note: For the inaugural ONE Flyweight Muay Thai World Championship.)
Women's Atomweight	Angela Lee (c)	def.	Mei Yamaguchi	Decision (unanimous)	5	5:00	ONE: Unstoppable Dreams	(Note: For the ONE Women's Atomweight World Championship.)
Women's Strawweight	Xiong Jing Nan (c)	def.	Laura Balin	Decision (unanimous)	5	5:00	ONE: Pinnacle of Power	(Note: For the ONE Women's Strawweight World Championship.)
Flyweight	Geje Eustaquio (ic)	def.	Adriano Moraes (c)	Decision (split)	5	5:00	ONE: Pinnacle of Power	(Note: For the ONE Flyweight World Championship.)
Middleweight	Aung La Nsang (c)	def.	Ken Hasegawa	KO (punch)	5	3:13	ONE: Spirit of A Warrior	(Note: For the ONE Middleweight World Championship.)
Women's Atomweight Kickboxing	Kai Ting Chuang	def.	Yodcherry Sityodtong	Decision (unanimous)	5	3:00	ONE: Battle for the Heavens	(Note: For the inaugural ONE Women's Atomweight Kickboxing World Championship.)
Bantamweight	Kevin Belingon	def.	Martin Nguyen	Decision (unanimous)	5	5:00	ONE: Reign of Kings	(Note: For the interim ONE Bantamweight World Championship.)
Women's Strawweight	Xiong Jing Nan (c)	def.	Samara Santos	KO (punch)	3	1:22	ONE: Beyond The Horizon	(Note: For the ONE Women's Strawweight World Championship.)
Strawweight	Joshua Pacio	def.	Yoshitaka Naito (c)	Decision (unanimous)	5	5:00	ONE: Conquest of Heroes	(Note: For the ONE Strawweight World Championship.)
Women's Atomweight Kickboxing	Stamp Fairtex	def.	Kai Ting Chuang (c)	Decision (unanimous)	5	3:00	ONE: Kingdom of Heroes	(Note: For the ONE Women's Atomweight Kickboxing World Championship.)
Middleweight	Aung La Nsang (c)	def.	Mohammad Karaki	TKO (punches)	1	2:21	ONE: Pursuit of Greatness	(Note: For the ONE Middleweight World Championship.)
Bantamweight	Kevin Belingon (ic)	def.	Bibiano Fernandes (c)	Decision (split)	5	5:00	ONE: Heart of the Lion	(Note: For the ONE Bantamweight World Championship.)
Welterweight	Zebaztian Kadestam	def.	Tyler McGuire	KO (punch)	5	4:32	ONE: Warrior's Dream	(Note: For the vacant ONE Welterweight World Championship.)
Lightweight	Eduard Folayang	def.	Amir Khan	Decision (unanimous)	5	5:00	ONE: Conquest of Champions	(Note: For the vacant ONE Lightweight World Championship.)
Heavyweight	Brandon Vera (c)	def.	Mauro Cerilli	KO (punch)	1	1:04	ONE: Conquest of Champions	(Note: For the ONE Heavyweight World Championship.)

== ONE Championship: Kings of Courage ==
ONE Championship: Kings of Courage
- Promotion: ONE Championship
- Date: January 20, 2018
- Venue: Jakarta Convention Center
- City: Jakarta, Indonesia

ONE Championship: Kings of Courage (also known as ONE Championship 64) was a mixed martial arts event held by ONE Championship on January 20, 2018 at the Jakarta Convention Center, in Jakarta, Indonesia.

=== Results ===
Fight Card
Weight Class				Method	Round	Time	Notes
Women's Strawweight 57 kg	(China) Xiong Jing Nan	def.	(Singapore) Tiffany Teo	KO/TKO	4	2:17	For the inaugural ONE Women's Strawweight Championship
Flyweight 61 kg	(Indonesia) Stefer Rahardian	def.	(Pakistan) Muhammad Imran	Decision (unanimous)	3	5:00	
Featherweight 70 kg	(Indonesia) Sunoto Penringkat	def.	(Cambodia) Rin Saroth	Submission (keylock)	2	2:07	
Lightweight 77 kg	(Russia) Timofey Nastyukhin	def.	(Singapore) Amir Khan	Decision (unanimous)	3	5:00	
Bantamweight 66 kg	(Russia) Yusup Saadulaev	def.	(Japan) Masakazu Imanari	Decision (unanimous)	3	5:00	
Featherweight 70 kg	(Indonesia) Victorio Senduk	def.	(Indonesia) Yohan Mulia Legowo	KO/TKO	2	0:57	
Flyweight 61 kg	(Indonesia) Riski Umar	def.	(Indonesia) Egi Rozten	KO/TKO	1	4:20	
Flyweight 61 kg	(Philippines) Rene Catalan	def.	(China) Peng Xuewen	KO/TKO (punches)	2	4:22	
Women Strawweight 57 kg	(Indonesia) Priscilla Gaol	def.	(Malaysia) Audreylaura Boniface	KO/TKO (punches)	1	3:23	

== ONE Championship: Global Superheroes ==
ONE Championship: Global Superheroes
- Promotion: ONE Championship
- Date: January 26, 2018
- Venue: Mall of Asia Arena
- City: Manila, Philippines

ONE Championship: Global Superheroes (also known as ONE Championship 65) was a mixed martial arts event held by ONE Championship on January 26, 2018 at the Mall of Asia Arena, in Manila, Philippines.

=== Results ===
Fight Card
Weight Class				Method	Round	Time	Notes
Flyweight 61 kg	(Philippines) Geje Eustaquio	def.	(Kazakhstan) Kairat Akhmetov	Decision (unanimous)	5	5:00	For the Interim ONE Flyweight Championship
Strawweight 57 kg	(Philippines) Joshua Pacio	def.	(China) Lan Ming Qiang	Submission (rear-naked choke)	1	4:01	
Featherweight 70 kg	(Brazil) Rafael Nunes	def.	(Philippines) Eric Kelly	Submission	2	1:31	
Flyweight 61 kg	(China) Haobin Ma	def.	(Bulgaria) Sotir Kichukov	Decision	3	5:00	
Flyweight 61 kg	(Japan) Hayato Suzuki	def.	(Brazil) Yago Bryan	Submission	1	4:03	
Featherweight 70 kg	(United States) Emilio Urrutia	def.	(Brazil) Bruno Pucci	KO/TKO	1	3:33	
Featherweight 70 kg	(Philippines) Edward Kelly	def.	(Cambodia) Meas Meu	Knockout	1	0:21	
Women's Strawweight 57 kg	(Philippines) Jomary Torres	def.	(Philippines) April Osenio	KO/TKO (slam & punches)	1	0:40	
Lightweight 77 kg	(India) Rajinder Singh Meena	def.	(China) Ze Hao Zhang	Submission (guillotine choke)	1	0:42	
Flyweight 61 kg	(Indonesia) Adrian Matheis	def.	(Malaysia) Eddey Kalai	Submission (rear naked choke)	1	4:15	

== ONE Championship: Quest for Gold ==
ONE Championship: Quest for Gold
- Promotion: ONE Championship
- Date: February 23, 2018
- Venue: Thuwunna Stadium
- City: Yangon, Myanmar

ONE Championship: Quest for Gold (also known as ONE Championship 66) was a mixed martial arts event held by ONE Championship on February 23, 2018 at the Thuwunna Indoor Stadium, in Yangon, Myanmar.

=== Results ===
Fight Card
Weight Class				Method	Round	Time	Notes
Cruiserweight 102 kg	(Myanmar) Aung La Nsang	def.	(Brazil) Alexandre Machado	TKO (head kick and punches)	1	0:56	For the vacant ONE Cruiserweight Championship
Lightweight 77 kg	(Malaysia) Ev Ting	def.	(Costa Rica) Ariel Sexton	Decision (split)	3	5:00	
Featherweight 70 kg	(Myanmar) Phoe Thaw	def.	(Cambodia) Sor Sey	KO (head kick)	1	1:53	
Lightweight 77 kg	(Russia) Timofey Nastyukhin	def.	(Singapore) Amir Khan	Decision (unanimous)	3	5:00	
Bantamweight 66 kg	(Japan) Daichi Takenaka	def.	(South Korea) Dae Hwan Kim	DQ (illegal strike)	1	3:06	
Flyweight 61 kg	(Myanmar) Ye Thway Ne	def.	(Myanmar) Saw Min Min	Decision (split)	3	5:00	Lethwei fight
Featherweight 70 kg	(China) Kai Wen Li	def.	(Philippines) Roel Rosauro	Submission (guillotine choke)	1	0:43	
Women Atomweight 52 kg	(Indonesia) Priscilla Hertati Lumban Gaol	def.	(Philippines) Krisna Limbaga	Submission (arm triangle choke)	1	4:05	
Women Atomweight 52 kg	(Myanmar) Bozhena Antoniyar	def.	(Myanmar) Shwe Sin	TKO (punches)	1	0:24	

== ONE Championship: Visions of Victory ==
ONE Championship: Visions of Victory
- Promotion: ONE Championship
- Date: March 9, 2018
- Venue: Axiata Arena
- City: Kuala Lumpur, Malaysia

ONE Championship: Visions of Victory (also known as ONE Championship 67) was a mixed martial arts event held by ONE Championship on March 9, 2018 at the Axiata Arena, in Kuala Lumpur, Malaysia.

=== Results ===
Main card
Weight class				Method	Round	Time	Notes
Flyweight 61 kg	(Australia) Reece McLaren	def.	(Malaysia) Gianni Subba	Submission (arm triangle choke)	2	3:12
Middleweight 93 kg	(Malaysia) Agilan Thani	def.	(India) Amitesh Chaubey	Submission (kimura)	2
Featherweight 70 kg	(Canada) Christian Lee	def.	(Japan) Kazunori Yokota	Submission (guillotine choke)	2	4:34
Flyweight 61 kg	(Philippines) Danny Kingad	def.	(Bulgaria) Sotir Kichukov	Decision (unanimous)	3	5:00
Welterweight 84 kg	(Brazil) Luis Santos	def.	(Kyrgyzstan) Kiamrian Abbasov	Decision (unanimous)	3	5:00
Women's Flyweight 61 kg	(Brazil) Michelle Nicolini	def.	(Ukraine) Iryna Kyselova	Submission (rear naked choke)	1
Featherweight 70 kg	(China) Ma Jia Wen	def.	(Pakistan) Ahmed Mujtaba	Submission (rear naked choke)	2
Featherweight 70 kg	(Malaysia) Muhammad Aiman	def.	(Cambodia) Rin Saroth	Decision (unanimous)	3	5:00
Women's Strawweight 57 kg	(Malaysia) Jihin Radzuan	def.	(India) Puja Tomar	Submission (triangle choke)	2	2:23
Bantamweight 66 kg	(Cambodia) Khun Sichan	def.	(Indonesia) Riski Umar	Decision (split)	3	5:00

== ONE Championship: Iron Will ==
ONE Championship: Iron Will
- Promotion: ONE Championship
- Date: March 24, 2018
- Venue: Impact Arena
- City: Bangkok, Thailand

ONE Championship: Iron Will (also known as ONE Championship 68) was a mixed martial arts event held by ONE Championship on March 24, 2018 at the Impact Arena, in Bangkok, Thailand.

=== Results ===
Main card
Weight class				Method	Round	Time	Notes
Bantamweight 66 kg	(Brazil) Bibiano Fernandes (c)	def.	(Australia) Martin Nguyen (FW/LW c)	Decision (split)	5	5:00	(Note: For the ONE Bantamweight Championship)
Strawweight 57 kg	(Philippines) Jeremy Miado	def.	(Thailand) Dejdamrong Sor Amnuaysirichoke	KO/TKO (punches)	1	1:29
Lightweight 77 kg	(Thailand) Shannon Wiratchai	def.	(India) Rahul Raju	KO/TKO (punch)	1	0:21
Women's Atomweight 52 kg	(Philippines) Angelie Sabanal	def.	(Thailand) Rika Ishige	Decision (unanimous)	3	5:00
Lightweight 77 kg	(Turkey) Saygid Guseyn Arslanaliev	def.	(Japan) Tetsuya Yamada	Submission (armbar)	3	2:51
Featherweight 70 kg	(Pakistan) Waqar Umar	def.	(China) Zhao Zhi Kang	Submission (rear naked choke)	1	4:21
Lightweight 77 kg	(United States) Garry Tonon	def.	(Philippines) Richard Corminal	KO/TKO (ground & pound)	2	3:40	(Note: Preliminary Card)
Light Heavyweight 102 kg	(Hong Kong) Alain Ngalani	def.	(Mongolia) Ariunbod Tur-Ochir	Decision (split)	3	5:00
Middleweight 93 kg	(Brazil) Gilberto Galvao	def.	(United States) Jake Butler	KO/TKO (knee injury)	2	0:07
Bantamweight 66 kg	(Indonesia) Sunoto Peringkat	def.	(Malaysia) Hisyam Samsudin	Decision (unanimous)	3	5:00

== ONE Warrior Series 1 ==
ONE Warrior Series 1
- Promotion: ONE Championship
- Date: March 31, 2018
- Venue: Zepp@Big Box
- City: Singapore

ONE Warrior Series 1 was a mixed martial arts event held by ONE Championship on March 31, 2018 in Singapore.

=== Background ===
The event was the first in a series that was organized to complement Rich Franklin's One Warrior Series, a show featuring the ONE Championship Vice President and former UFC middleweight champion, which was created to discover fresh young talent.

Rockie Bactol, Kim Woon Kyoom, and Dae Sung Park were announced as the first winners of $100,000+ ONE Championship contracts as overall winners of the reality documentary series at the conclusion of the fight card.

=== Results ===
ONE Warrior Series 1
Weight Class				Method	Round	Time
Lightweight 77 kg	(South Korea) Dae Sung Park	def.	(Japan) Kimihiro Eto	Submission (Arm-Triangle Choke)	1	1:41
Bantamweight 66 kg	(South Korea) Joo Hwan Kim	def.	(Pakistan) Faizan Khan	Decision (Unanimous)	3	5:00
Welterweight 84 kg	(Nigeria) Emmanuel Onyedikachi	def.	(Thailand) Nat Natchayangkuld	Decision (Unanimous)	3	5:00
Bantamweight 66 kg	(Iran) Ali Motamed	def.	(South Korea) Dawoon Jung	KO (knee)	2	0:19
Bantamweight 66 kg	(Cambodia) Chan Samart	def.	(Thailand) Detchadin Srosirisuphathin	KO (Punches)	1	2:50
Bantamweight 66 kg	(United States) Michael Walker	def.	(Philippines) Michael Fangki	Decision (Unanimous)	3	5:00
Lightweight 77 kg	(United States) JD Hardwick	def.	(China) Lu Zhibo	Decision (Unanimous)	2	4:09
Bantamweight 66 kg	(Philippines) Rockie Bactol	def.	(Philippines) Mark Cuizon	Submission (Keylock)	1	4:45
Featherweight 70 kg	(Philippines) Jerry Olsim	def.	(Pakistan) Shahid Siddiqui	Decision (Unanimous)	3	5:00
Bantamweight 66 kg	(South Korea) Kim Woon Kyoum	def.	(Bangladesh) Muhammad Islam	TKO (Punches)	1	1:30
Strawweight 57 kg	(Philippines) Ismael Bandiwan	def.	(Malaysia) Mohd Fouzein	Decision (Unanimous)	3	5:00
Bantamweight 66 kg	(South Korea) Lee Hyun Jin	def.	(Tajikistan) Shafkat Khodzhkulov	Submission (Triangle Choke)	1	3:49
Flyweight 61 kg	(Japan) Akihiro Fujisawa	def.	(Nepal) Sandeep Gurung	TKO (Punches)	1	4:20
W.Atomweight 52 kg	(New Zealand) Nyrene Crowley	def.	(South Korea) So Yul Kim	Decision (Unanimous)	3	5:00
Flyweight 61 kg	(Brunei) Adib Suleiman	def.	(Myanmar) Sai Nyan Lin	TKO (Punches)	2	3:01
Featherweight 70 kg	(Hong Kong) Ernest Tang	def.	(Malaysia) Allen Chong	TKO (Punches)	3	0:30

== ONE Championship: Heroes of Honor ==
ONE Championship: Heroes of Honor
- Promotion: ONE Championship
- Date: April 20, 2018
- Venue: Mall of Asia Arena
- City: Manila, Philippines

ONE Championship: Heroes of Honor (also known as ONE Championship 69) was a mixed martial arts event held by ONE Championship on April 20, 2018 at the Mall of Asia Arena, in Manila, Philippines.

=== Results ===
Main card
Weight class				Method	Round	Time	Notes
Bantamweight 66 kg	(Philippines) Kevin Belingon	def.	(United States) Andrew Leone	KO/TKO (ground & pound)	2	1:26
Lightweight 77 kg	(Philippines) Honorio Banario	def.	(Australia) Adrian Pang	Decision (split)	3	5:00
Featherweight 70 kg	(Russia) Marat Gafurov	def.	(United States) Emilio Urrutia	Submission (arm triangle choke)	1	2:34
Women's Strawweight 57 kg	(Philippines) Gina Iniong	def.	(Taiwan) Jenny Huang	Decision (unanimous)	3	5:00
Bantamweight 66 kg	(South Korea) Dae Hwan Kim	def.	(Japan) Masakazu Imanari	Decision (unanimous)	3	5:00
Bantamweight 66 kg	(Indonesia) Adrian Matheis	def.	(China) Lan Ming Qiang	Decision (unanimous)	3	5:00
Bantamweight 66 kg	(Japan) Akihiro Fujisawa	def.	(Philippines) Kaji Ebin	Verbal submission (shoulder injury)	1	1:48

== ONE Championship: Grit and Glory ==
ONE Championship: Grit and Glory
- Promotion: ONE Championship
- Date: May 12, 2018
- Venue: Jakarta Convention Center
- City: Jakarta, Indonesia

ONE Championship: Grit and Glory (also known as ONE Championship 70) was a mixed martial arts event held by ONE Championship on May 12, 2018 at the Jakarta Convention Center, in Jakarta, Indonesia.

=== Results ===
Main card
Weight class				Method	Round	Time	Notes
Strawweight 57 kg	(Japan) Yoshitaka Naito	def.	(Brazil) Alex Silva (c)	Decision (split)	5	5:00	(Note: For the ONE Strawweight Championship)
Strawweight 57 kg	(Indonesia) Stefer Rahardian	def.	(India) Himanshu Kaushik	Submission (rear-naked choke)	1	2:25
Middleweight 93 kg	(Brazil) Leandro Ataides	def.	(Russia) Vitaly Bigdash	TKO (punches)	3	2:37
Women's Atomweight 52 kg	(Indonesia) Priscilla Hertati Lumban Gaol	def.	(Philippines) Rome Trinidad	Submission (rear-naked choke)	1	2:27
Featherweight 70 kg	(Cambodia) Sor Sey	def.	(Indonesia) Victorio Senduk	Decision (unanimous)	3	5:00
Lightweight 77 kg	(Japan) Tetsuya Yamada	def.	(Philippines) Eric Kelly	Submission (rear-naked choke)	1	3:00
Bantamweight 66 kg	(Singapore) Radeem Rahman	def.	(China) Tang Da Fen	Submission (rear-naked choke)	1	1:19
Bantamweight 66 kg	(Indonesia) Elipitua Siregar	def.	(Indonesia) Dodi Mardian	Submission (rear-naked choke)	1	3:59
Strawweight 57 kg	(Indonesia) Riski Umar	def.	(Indonesia) Doan Birawa	Submission (rear-naked choke)	2	1:22

== ONE Championship: Unstoppable Dreams ==
ONE Championship: Unstoppable Dreams
- Promotion: ONE Championship
- Date: May 18, 2018
- Venue: Singapore Indoor Stadium
- City: Kallang, Singapore

ONE Championship: Unstoppable Dreams (also known as ONE Championship 71) was a mixed martial arts event held by ONE Championship on May 18, 2018 at the Singapore Indoor Stadium in Kallang, Singapore.

=== Background ===
This event featured three title fights first a ONE Women's Atomweight Championship bout between the champion Angela Lee and top contender Mei Yamaguchi to serve as the event headliner, secondly a bout for the inaugural ONE Muay Thai Flyweight Championship between Sam-A Kaiyanghadaogym and Sergio Wielzen as co-headliner and finally a bout for the ONE Featherweight Championship, Martin Nguyen makes the first defense of his title against top contender Christian Lee.

=== Results ===
ONE Championship: Unstoppable Dreams
Weight Class				Method	Round	Time	Notes
Atomweight 52 kg	(Canada) Angela Lee (c)	def.	(Japan) Mei Yamaguchi	Decision (Unanimous)	5	5:00	For the ONE Women's Atomweight Championship
Flyweight 61 kg	(Thailand) Sam-A Gaiyanghadao	def.	(Suriname) Sergio Wielzen	KO (Elbows)	4	2:47	For the inaugural ONE Muay Thai Flyweight Championship
Featherweight 70 kg	(Australia) Martin Nguyen (c)	def.	(Canada) Christian Lee	Decision (Split)	5	5:00	For the ONE Featherweight Championship
Catchweight (72.5 kg)	(Thailand) Yodsanklai Fairtex	def.	(Democratic Republic of the Congo) Chris Ngimbi	Decision (Unanimous)	3	3:00	Kickboxing
Lightweight 77 kg	(Japan) Shinya Aoki	def.	(Russia) Rasul Yakhyaev	Submission (Triangle Choke)	1	3:15	
Lightweight 77 kg	(Philippines) Eduard Folayang	def.	(Russia) Kharun Atlangeriev	Decision (Unanimous)	3	5:00	
Lightweight 77 kg	(Singapore) Amir Khan	def.	(South Korea) Sung Jong Lee	TKO(Punches)	2	3:39	
Preliminary Card
Flyweight 61 kg	(Thailand) Singtongnoi Por.Telakun	def.	(Italy) Joseph Lasiri	TKO (Cut)	2	2:36	Muay Thai
Featherweight 70 kg	(China) Xie Chao	def.	(Cambodia) Meas Meu	TKO (Punches)	3	1:10	
Bantamweight 66 kg	(China) Xie Bin	def.	(Singapore) Shi Hao Huang	TKO (Corner Stoppage)	2	2:26	
Bantamweight 66 kg	(Indonesia) Sunoto Peringkat	def.	(Philippines) Roel Rosauro	Decision (Unanimous)	3	5:00	

== ONE Championship: Battle for the Heavens (Cancelled) ==
ONE Championship: Battle for the Heavens
- Promotion: ONE Championship
- Date: May 26, 2018
- Venue: Shanghai Oriental Sports Center
- City: Shanghai, China

The event was cancelled.

== ONE Championship: Pinnacle of Power ==
ONE: Pinnacle of Power
- Promotion: ONE Championship
- Date: June 23, 2018
- Venue: Olympic Sports Center
- City: Beijing, China

ONE Championship: Pinnacle of Power (also known as ONE Championship 72) was a mixed martial arts event held by ONE Championship on June 23, 2018 at the Olympic Sports Center in Beijing, China.

=== Background ===
This event featured a two title fights first a ONE Flyweight Championship unification bout between two-time champion Adriano Moraes and interim champion Geje Eustaquio to serve as the event headliner, and a bout for the ONE Women's Strawweight Championship between Jingnan Xiong and Laura Balin as co-headliner.

=== Results ===
ONE Championship: Pinnacle of Power
Weight Class				Method	Round	Time	Notes
Flyweight 61 kg	(Philippines) Geje Eustaquio (ic)	def.	(Brazil) Adriano Moraes (c)	Decision (Split)	5	5:00	For the Unification of the ONE Flyweight Championship
Women's Strawweight 57 kg	(China) Xiong Jingnan (c)	def.	(Argentina) Laura Balin	Decision (Unanimous)	5	5:00	For the ONE Women's Strawweight Championship
Catchweight (67 kg)	(Thailand) Phetmorakot Petchyindee Academy	def.	(France) Fabrice Fairtex Delannon	TKO (Cut)	2	0:43	Muay Thai
Lightweight 77 kg	(New Zealand) Ev Ting	def.	(Japan) Koji Ando	Decision (Unanimous)	3	5:00	
Featherweight 70 kg	(Mongolia) Jadamba Narantungalag	def.	(Philippines) Edward Kelly	TKO (Punches)	2	4:58	
Flyweight 61 kg	(Thailand) Lerdsila Chumpairtour	def.	(Cambodia) Sok Thy	Decision (Split)	3	3:00	Muay Thai
Heavyweight 120 kg	(Morocco) Tarik Khbabez	def.	(Hong Kong) Alain Ngalani	TKO (Punches)	3	1:49	Kickboxing
Preliminary Card
Flyweight 61 kg	(Japan) Yukinori Ogasawara	def.	(Portugal) Rui Botelho	KO (Spinning Back Elbow)	2	2:54	Muay Thai
Featherweight 70 kg	(China) Li Kai Wen	def.	(Philippines) Rodian Menchavez	KO (Punch)	1	0:10	
Flyweight 61 kg	(Philippines) Danny Kingad	def.	(China) Ma Haobin	Decision (Unanimous)	3	5:00	
Featherweight 70 kg	(Cambodia) Rin Saroth	def.	(Indonesia) Mario Satya Wirawan	TKO (Elbows)	3	2:30	

== ONE Warrior Series 2 ==
ONE Warrior Series 2
- Promotion: ONE Championship
- Date: July 19, 2018
- Venue: Zepp@Big Box
- City: Singapore

ONE Warrior Series 2 was a mixed martial arts event held by ONE Championship on October 11, 2018 in Singapore.

=== Results ===
ONE Warrior Series 2
Weight Class				Method	Round	Time
Lightweight 77 kg	(Japan) Kimihiro Eto	def.	(Japan) Yusaku Inoue	Submission (Arm-Triangle Choke)	2	4:39
W.Strawweight 57 kg	(United States) JD Hardwick	def.	(Mongolia) Davaabayar Enkhtaivan	Submission (Armbar)	1	2:32
Bantamweight 66 kg	(Philippines) Mark Abelardo	def.	(Iran) Ali Motamed	Decision (Unanimous)	3	5:00
Flyweight 62 kg	(Thailand) Saharat Khongsawat	def.	(Bahrain) Adib Sulaiman	KO (knee)	2	4:32
W.Atomweight 52 kg	(Thailand) Stamp Fairtex	def.	(India) Rashi Shinde	KO (Head Kick)	1	0:19
Bantamweight 66 kg	(United States) Michael Walker	def.	(Tajikistan) Shafkat Khodzhkulov	Submission (Rear-Naked Choke)	1	1:26
Flyweight 62 kg	(Philippines) Mark Cuizon	def.	(Philippines) Ismael Bandiwan	Decision (Unanimous)	3	5:00
Bantamweight 66 kg	(Mongolia) Shinechagtga Zoltsetseg	def.	(Japan) Akuri Ronda	KO (Punche)	1	0:58
Strawweight 57 kg	(Malaysia) Alexander Fong	def.	(Thailand) Sanya Kongkatonk	Submission (Triangle Choke)	1	4:20
Bantamweight 66 kg	(Philippines) Michael Fangki	def.	(Cambodia) Chan Samart	TKO (Punches)	1	1:54
Middleweight 93 kg	(Nigeria) Emmanuel Onyedikachi	def.	(India) Sandeep Kumar Dahiya	TKO (Submission To Leg Kicks)	1	2:44
W.Atomweight 52 kg	(Malaysia) Edilah Johany	def.	(India) Neha Kashyap	Submission (Rear-Naked Choke)	1	1:43
Strawweight 57 kg	(Japan) Ryuto Sawada	def.	(Malaysia) Mohd Fouzein	Submission (D'Arce Choke)	1	2:09
Bantamweight 66 kg	(Myanmar) Punnya Sai	def.	(Myanmar) Nyan Lin Sai	Submission (Rear-Naked Choke)	1	3:56
W.Atomweight 52 kg	(New Zealand) Nyrene Crowley	def.	(Pakistan) Anita Karim	Submission (Rear-Naked Choke)	2	1:54

== ONE Championship: Spirit Of A Warrior ==
ONE: Spirit Of A Warrior
- Promotion: ONE Championship
- Date: June 29, 2018
- Venue: Thuwunna Indoor Stadium
- City: Yangon, Myanmar

ONE Championship: Spirit Of A Warrior (also known as ONE Championship 73) was a mixed martial arts event held by ONE Championship on June 29, 2018 at the Thuwunna Indoor Stadium in Yangon, Myanmar.

=== Background ===
This event featured a world title fight for the ONE Middleweight Championship, Aung La Nsang of Myanmar makes the first defense of his title against top contender Ken Hasegawa of Japan as ONE Championship: Spirit Of A Warrior headliner.

The co-main event featured a Bantamweight bout between top contender Leandro Issa and Roman Alvarez.

The result of the fight between Sagetdao Petpayathai and Jia Wen Ma was originally a decision win for Petpayathai; ONE FC Competition Committee officially reversed the decision after review Jia Wen Ma is now the winner.

=== Results ===
ONE Championship: Spirit Of A Warrior
Weight Class				Method	Round	Time	Notes
Middleweight 93 kg	(Myanmar) Aung La Nsang (c)	def.	(Japan) Ken Hasegawa	KO (Punches)	5	3:13	For The ONE Middleweight Championship
Bantamweight 66 kg	(Brazil) Leandro Issa	def.	(Northern Mariana Islands) Roman Alvarez	Submission (Arm-Triangle Choke)	1	1:26	
Catchweight (72 kg)	(Thailand) Sorgraw Petchyindee	def.	(France) Samy Sana	Decision (Unanimous)	3	3:00	Kickboxing
Featherweight 70 kg	(China) Ma Jia Wen	def.	(Thailand) Sagetdao Petpayathai	Decision (Unanimous)	3	5:00	Was originally a decision win for Petpayathai, Result was overturned
Featherweight 70 kg	(Japan) Tetsuya Yamada	def.	(Brazil) Rafael Nunes	TKO (Doctor Stoppage)	2	4:05	
Bantamweight 66 kg	(China) Chen Lei	def.	(Afghanistan) Ahmad Qais Jasoor	TKO(Punches)	3	1:27	
Strawweight 57 kg	(Thailand) Kritsada Kongsrichai	def.	(Philippines) Jeremy Miado	Decision (Unanimous)	3	5:00	
Preliminary Card
Catchweight (67 kg)	(Thailand) Tukkatatong Phetpayatai	def.	(France) Mehdi Zatout	Decision (Unanimous)	3	3:00	Kickboxing
Flyweight 61 kg	(Myanmar) Mite Yine	def.	(Myanmar) Saw Darwait	TKO (Punches)	1	2:48	
Lightweight 77 kg	(Australia) Elliot Compton	def.	(United States) Matthew Semper	Decision (Unanimous)	3	3:00	Kickboxing

== ONE Championship: Battle for the Heavens ==
ONE: Battle for the Heavens
- Promotion: ONE Championship
- Date: July 7, 2018
- Venue: Tianhe Gymnasium
- City: Guangzhou, China

ONE Championship: Battle for the Heavens (also known as ONE Championship 74) was a mixed martial arts event held by ONE Championship on July 7, 2018 at the Tianhe Gymnasium in Guangzhou, China.

=== Background ===
This event featured a world title fight for the inaugural ONE Kickboxing Women's Atomweight Championship between Yodcherry Sityodtong of Thailand against Kai Ting Chuang of China as ONE Championship: Battle for the Heavens headliner.

=== Results ===
ONE Championship: Battle for the Heavens
Weight Class				Method	Round	Time	Notes
Atomweight 52 kg	(China) Kai Ting Chuang	def.	(Thailand) Yodcherry Sityodtong	Decision (Unanimous)	5	3:00	For The Inaugural ONE Kickboxing Women's Atomweight Championship
Flyweight 61 kg	(Australia) Reece McLaren	def.	(Japan) Tatsumitsu Wada	Decision (Split)	3	5:00	
Catchweight (105 kg)	(Morocco) Ibrahim El Bouni	def.	(Australia) Andre Meunier	KO (Punches)	1	1:31	Kickboxing
Bantamweight 66 kg	(China) Fu Changxin	def.	(Kazakhstan) Rustem Ensebayev	TKO (Punches)	1	4:32	
Bantamweight 66 kg	(Thailand) Saemapetch Fairtex	def.	(Lithuania) Deividas Danyla	Decision (Unanimous)	3	3:00	Kickboxing
Catchweight (68 kg)	(China) Zhao Zhikang	def.	(China) Ma Xudong	Submission (Guillotine Choke)	3	1:08	
Preliminary Card
Atomweight 52 kg	(Brazil) Istela Nunes	def.	(Philippines) Gina Iniong	Decision (Unanimous)	3	5:00	
Bantamweight 66 kg	(Japan) Shuya Kamikubo	def.	(Indonesia) Sunoto Peringkat	TKO (Punches)	2	3:54	
Strawweight 57 kg	(China) Peng Xuewen	def.	(Malaysia) Eddey Kalai	TKO (Punches)	1	0:57	
Strawweight 57 kg	(Philippines) Robin Catalan	def.	(Indonesia) Adrian Matheis	Submission (Heel Hook)	2	2:10	

== ONE Championship: Pursuit of Power ==
ONE: Pursuit of Power
- Promotion: ONE Championship
- Date: July 13, 2018
- Venue: Axiata Arena
- City: Kuala Lumpur, Malaysia

ONE Championship: Pursuit of Power (also known as ONE Championship 75) was a mixed martial arts event held by ONE Championship on July 13, 2018 at the Axiata Arena in Kuala Lumpur, Malaysia.

=== Background ===
This event featured a Superfight between top contender from Sweden Zebaztian Kadestam and Agilan Thani of Malaysia as ONE Championship: Pursuit of Power headliner.

The co-main event featured a Featherweight Muay Thai bout between top contender Jo Nattawut and Yohann Drai.

=== Results ===
ONE Championship: Pursuit of Power
Weight Class				Method	Round	Time	Notes
Welterweight 84 kg	(Sweden) Zebaztian Kadestam	def.	(Malaysia) Agilan Thani	TKO (Elbows)	3	1:56	
Featherweight 70 kg	(Thailand) Jo Nattawut	def.	(France) Yohann Drai	KO (Punches)	1	2:59	Muay Thai
Welterweight 84 kg	(United States) Tyler McGuire	def.	(Brazil) Luís Santos	Decision (Unanimous)	3	5:00	
Featherweight 70 kg	(Mongolia) Jadamba Narantungalag	def.	(Japan) Kazuki Tokudome	Decision (Unanimous)	3	5:00	
Middleweight 93 kg	(Lithuania) Sergej Maslobojev	def.	(France) Florent Kaouachi	Decision (Unanimous)	3	3:00	Kickboxing
Featherweight 70 kg	(Malaysia) Keanu Subba	def.	(China) Xie Chao	Submission (Armbar)	1	3:31	
Lightweight 77 kg	(Costa Rica) Ariel Sexton	def.	(Japan) Kota Shimoishi	Submission (Americana)	3	0:44	
Preliminary Card
Featherweight 70 kg	(China) Li Kai Wen	def.	(United States) Emilio Urrutia	TKO (Punches)	3	1:22	
Atomweight 52 kg	(Malaysia) Jihin Radzuan	def.	(Indonesia) Priscilla Hertati Lumban Gaol	Decision (Unanimous)	3	5:00	
Flyweight 61 kg	(Thailand) Petchdam Petchyindee Academy	def.	(Australia) Josh Tonna	KO (Knee)	2	1:11	Muay Thai
Welterweight 84 kg	(South Korea) Dae Sung Park	def.	(Philippines) Trestle Tan	Decision (Unanimous)	3	5:00	

== ONE Championship: Reign of Kings ==
ONE: Reign of Kings
- Promotion: ONE Championship
- Date: July 27, 2018
- Venue: Mall of Asia Arena
- City: Manila, Philippines

ONE Championship: Reign of Kings (also known as ONE Championship 76) will be a mixed martial arts event held by ONE Championship on July 27, 2018 at the Mall of Asia Arena in Manila, Philippines.

=== Background ===
This event featured a world title fight for the interim ONE Bantamweight Championship, Filipino top contender Kevin Belingon take on the ONE Championship Featherweight and Lightweight champion Martin Nguyen as ONE Championship: Reign of Kings headliner.

The co-main event featured a Lightweight bout between top contender Shinya Aoki and Shannon Wiratchai.

=== Results ===
ONE Championship: Reign of Kings
Weight Class				Method	Round	Time	Notes
Bantamweight 66 kg	(Philippines) Kevin Belingon	def.	(Australia) Martin Nguyen	Decision (Unanimous)	5	5:00	For the Interim ONE Bantamweight Championship
Lightweight 77 kg	(Japan) Shinya Aoki	def.	(Thailand) Shannon Wiratchai	KO/TKO (ground & pound)	1	2:16	
Welterweight 84 kg	(Brazil) Renzo Gracie	def.	(Japan) Yuki Kondo	Submission (rear naked choke)	2	1:40	
Lightweight 77 kg	(Philippines) Eduard Folayang	def.	(Russia) Aziz Pahrudinov	Decision (unanimous)	3	5:00	
Lightweight 77 kg	(United States) Garry Tonon	def.	(India) Rahul Raju	Submission (rear naked choke)	3	3:27	
Catchweight (72.5 kg)	(Democratic Republic of the Congo) Chris Ngimbi	def.	(Italy) Armen Petrosyan	Decision (Split)	3	3:00	Kickboxing
Bantamweight 66 kg	(Cyprus) Panicos Yusuf	def.	(China) Han Zihao	Decision (Unanimous)	3	3:00	Muay Thai
Preliminary Card
Strawweight 57 kg	(Philippines) Joshua Pacio	def.	(Thailand) Pongsiri Mitsatit	Submission (Hammerlock)	1	3:37	
Catchweight (70.6 kg)	(Thailand) Chamuaktong Fightermuaythai	def.	(Netherlands) Brown Pinas	Decision (Unanimous)	3	3:00	Muay Thai
Strawweight 57 kg	(Philippines) Rene Catalan	def.	(Indonesia) Stefer Rahardian	Decision (Unanimous)	3	5:00	
Featherweight 70 kg	(China) Xie Bin	def.	(Cambodia) Sor Sey	Submission (D'arce choke)	1	1:55	

== ONE Championship: Beyond The Horizon ==
ONE: Beyond The Horizon
- Promotion: ONE Championship
- Date: September 8, 2018
- Venue: Baoshan Arena
- City: Shanghai, China

ONE Championship: Beyond The Horizon (also known as ONE Championship 77) was a mixed martial arts event held by ONE Championship on September 8, 2018 at the Baoshan Arena in Shanghai, China.

=== Background ===
Roman Alvarez had to withdraw due to an injury and is not able to fight against Daichi Takenaka, the bout was canceled.

=== Results ===
ONE Championship: Beyond The Horizon
Weight Class				Method	Round	Time	Notes
Women's Strawweight 57 kg	(China) Xiong Jingnan (c)	def.	(Brazil) Samara Santos	TKO (Punch)	3	1:22	For the ONE Women's Strawweight Championship
Lightweight 77 kg	(Singapore) Amir Khan	def.	(Philippines) Honorio Banario	Submission (Rear-Naked Choke)	1	4:34	
Featherweight 70 kg	(Philippines) Edward Kelly	def.	(Canada) Christian Lee	DQ (Illegal Spike)	1	2:21	
Bantamweight 66 kg	(Thailand) Tukkatatong Petpayathai	def.	(Serbia) Ognjen Topic	Decision (Unanimous)	3	3:00	Muay Thai
Bantamweight 66 kg	(China) Han Zihao	def.	(Greece) Stergos Mikkios	Decision (Unanimous)	3	3:00	Muay Thai
Catchweight (73 kg)	(Morocco) Mustapha Haida	def.	(Australia) Daniel Dawson	KO (Knee and Punches)	3	2:14	Kickboxing
Preliminary Card
Bantamweight 66 kg	(Malaysia) Muhammad Aiman	def.	(China) Chen Lei	Submission (Rear-Naked Choke)	2	4:35	
Flyweight 61 kg	(France) Hakim Hamech	def.	(Japan) Yukinori Ogasawara	KO (Punches)	1	2:59	Muay Thai
Strawweight 57 kg	(Indonesia) Elipitua Siregar	def.	(Cambodia) Phat Soda	TKO (Punches)	1	2:30	

== ONE Championship: Conquest of Heroes ==
ONE: Conquest of Heroes
- Promotion: ONE Championship
- Date: September 22, 2018
- Venue: Jakarta Convention Center
- City: Jakarta, Indonesia

ONE Championship: Conquest of Heroes (also known as ONE Championship 78) was a mixed martial arts event held by ONE Championship on September 22, 2018 at the Jakarta Convention Center in Jakarta, Indonesia.

=== Results ===
ONE Championship: Conquest of Heroes
Weight Class				Method	Round	Time	Notes
Strawweight 57 kg	(Philippines) Joshua Pacio	def.	(Japan) Yoshitaka Naito (c)	Decision (Unanimous)	5	5:00	For the ONE Strawweight Championship
Strawweight 57 kg	(China) Peng Xue Wen	def.	(Indonesia) Stefer Rahardian	Decision (Unanimous)	3	5:00	
Flyweight 61 kg	(Thailand) Rodtang Jitmuangnon	def.	(Suriname) Sergio Wielzen	Decision (Unanimous)	3	3:00	Muay Thai
Flyweight 61 kg	(Philippines) Danny Kingad	def.	(Japan) Yuya Wakamatsu	Decision (Unanimous)	3	5:00	
Featherweight 70 kg	(Japan) Koyomi Matsushima	def.	(Russia) Marat Gafurov	TKO (Knees and Punches)	1	2:41	
Lightweight 77 kg	(Russia) Saygid Guseyn Arslanaliev	def.	(Russia) Timofey Nastyukhin	KO (Punches)	1	1:57	
Flyweight 61 kg	(Kazakhstan) Kairat Akhmetov	def.	(China) Ma Haobin	Decision (Unanimous)	3	5:00	
Preliminary Card
Atomweight 52 kg	(Indonesia) Priscilla Gaol	def.	(Philippines) Jomary Torres	Decision (Unanimous)	3	5:00	
Bantamweight 66 kg	(France) Fabrice Delannon	def.	(Thailand) Yodpanomrung Jitmuangnon	Decision (Split)	3	3:00	Muay Thai
Bantamweight 66 kg	(Indonesia) Sunoto Peringkat	def.	(Indonesia) Victorio Senduk	Submission (Rear-Naked Choke)	2	4:12	
Strawweight 57 kg	(Indonesia) Adrian Mattheis	def.	(Indonesia) Angelo Bimoadji	TKO (Punches)	1	2:41	
Catchweight (59 kg)	(Indonesia) Egi Rozten	def.	(Indonesia) Riski Umar	TKO (Punches)	3	0:51	

== ONE Championship: Kingdom of Heroes ==
ONE: Kingdom of Heroes
- Promotion: ONE Championship
- Date: October 6, 2018
- Venue: Impact Arena
- City: Bangkok, Thailand

ONE Championship: Kingdom of Heroes (also known as ONE Championship 79) was a mixed martial arts event held by ONE Championship on October 6, 2018 at the Impact Arena in Bangkok, Thailand.

=== Background ===
This event featured a two title fights first a boxing match for the WBC Super Flyweight Boxing Championship between the champion Srisaket Sor Rungvisai and Iran Diaz to serve as the event headliner, and a bout for the ONE Kickboxing Women's Atomweight Championship between Kai Ting Zhuang and Stamp Fairtex as co-headliner.

=== Results ===
ONE Championship: Kingdom of Heroes
Weight Class				Method	Round	Time	Notes
Super Flyweight	(Thailand) Srisaket Sor Rungvisai (c)	def.	(Mexico) Iran Diaz	Decision (Unanimous)	12	3:00	For the WBC Super Flyweight Boxing Championship
Atomweight 52 kg	(Thailand) Stamp Fairtex	def.	(China) Kai Ting Chuang	Decision (Unanimous)	5	3:00	For the ONE Kickboxing Women's Atomweight Championship
Lightweight 77 kg	(Japan) Shinya Aoki	def.	(Malaysia) Ev Ting	Submission (Arm-Triangle Choke)	1	0:57	
Catchweight (67 kg)	(Thailand) Nong-O Gaiyanghadao	def.	(France) Mehdi Zatout	Decision (Unanimous)	3	3:00	Muay Thai
Lightweight 77 kg	(Nigeria) Anthony Njokuani	def.	(Netherlands) Andy Souwer	Decision (Split)	3	3:00	Kickboxing
Catchweight (67 kg)	(Tajikistan) Muin Gafurov	def.	(Brazil) Leandro Issa	KO (Punch)	1	2:24	
Preliminary Card
Heavyweight 120 kg	(Cameroon) Alain Ngalani		(Australia) Andre Meunier	No Contest	2	0:30	Kickboxing
Bantamweight 66 kg	(Russia) Alaverdi Ramazanov	def.	(Thailand) Phetmorakot Petchyindee Academy	Decision (Unanimous)	3	3:00	Muay Thai
Strawweight 57 kg	(Japan) Hayato Suzuki	def.	(Philippines) Robin Catalan	Submission (Rear-Naked Choke)	2	3:42	
Flyweight 61 kg	(Thailand) Singtongnoi Por.Telakun	def.	(Japan) Masahide Kudo	Decision (Unanimous)	3	3:00	Kickboxing
Atomweight 52 kg	(Thailand) Rika Ishige	def.	(Myanmar) Bozhena Antoniyar	TKO (Punches)	1	2:48	
Flyweight 61 kg	(Thailand) Petchdam Petchyindee Academy	def.	(China) Kenny Tse	KO (Head Kick)	1	1:26	Muay Thai
Bantamweight 66 kg	(China) Fu Chang Xin	def.	(Cambodia) Rin Saroth	Submission (Rear-Naked Choke)	2	3:04	
Flyweight 61 kg	(Philippines) Ramon Gonzalez	def.	(Indonesia) Dodi Mardian	Submission (Rear-Naked Choke)	1	3:33	

== ONE Warrior Series 3 ==
ONE Warrior Series 3
- Promotion: ONE Championship
- Date: October 11, 2018
- Venue: Zepp@Big Box
- City: Singapore

ONE Warrior Series 3 was a mixed martial arts event held by ONE Championship on October 11, 2018 in Singapore.

=== Results ===
ONE Warrior Series 3
Weight Class				Method	Round	Time
Lightweight 77 kg	(Japan) Kimihiro Eto	def.	(United States) JD Hardwick	Submission (Arm-Triangle Choke)	2	2:07
W.Strawweight 57 kg	(Philippines) Jenelyn Olsim	def.	(Spain) Claudia Diaz	Decision (Unanimous)	3	5:00
Flyweight 61 kg	(Thailand) Detchadin Sorsirisuphathin	def.	(Philippines) Mark Cuizon	Decision (Unanimous)	3	5:00
Welterweight 84 kg	(Nigeria) Emmanuel Onyedikachi	def.	(China) Xie Xiaoxiang	Decision (Unanimous)	3	5:00
Bantamweight 66 kg	(Mongolia) Ganbat Bayasgalan	def.	(South Korea) Joohwan Kim	Decision (Unanimous)	3	5:00
Bantamweight 66 kg	(Japan) Hyunjin Lee	def.	(United States) Michael Walker	TKO (Punches)	2	3:29
Bantamweight 66 kg	(Philippines) Mark Abelardo	def.	(Mongolia) Shinechagtga Zoltsetseg	TKO (Doctor Stoppage – Cut)	1	5:00
Featherweight 70 kg	(Philippines) Jerry Olsim	def.	(Hong Kong) Ernest Tang	TKO (Punches)	3	3:57
Featherweight 70 kg	(Azerbaijan) Anvar Amirli	def.	(Japan) Asuka Tsubaki	Submission (Rear Naked Choke)	1	4:27
W.Atomweight 52 kg	(Australia) Uyen Ha	def.	(Malaysia) Edilah Johany	TKO (Punches)	2	3:46
Strawweight 57 kg	(Philippines) Lito Adiwang	def.	(United States) Manuel Huerta	KO (Punch)	1	4:03
Strawweight 57 kg	(United States) Zechariah Lange	def.	(South Korea) Dawoon Jung	Decision (Unanimous)	3	5:00
Strawweight 57 kg	(Japan) Ryuto Sawada	def.	(Philippines) Ismael Bandiwan	Submission (Armbar)	1	4:30
Welterweight 84 kg	(United States) De'von Morris	def.	(China) Fu Guo An	TKO (Punches)	1	2:30
Featherweight 70 kg	(China) Luo Zhuo Jiang Cuo	def.	(Philippines) Mark Sumalag	Submission (Triangle Choke)	1	1:20
Bantamweight 66 kg	(Myanmar) Punnya Sai	def.	(Nepal) Krishna Lal Tamang	TKO	1	0:14
W.Atomweight 52 kg	(South Korea) So Yul Kim	def.	(Mongolia) Bayarmaa Munkhgerel	TKO (Retirement)	2	5:00

== ONE Championship: Pursuit of Greatness ==
ONE: Pursuit of Greatness
- Promotion: ONE Championship
- Date: October 26, 2018
- Venue: Thuwunna Indoor Stadium
- City: Yangon, Myanmar

ONE Championship: Pursuit of Greatness (also known as ONE Championship 80) was a mixed martial arts event held by ONE Championship on October 26, 2018 at the Thuwunna Indoor Stadium in Yangon, Myanmar.

=== Background ===
This event featured a world title fight for the ONE Middleweight Championship, Lebanese top contender Mohammad Karaki take on the ONE Championship Middleweight and Light Heavyweight champion Aung La Nsang as ONE Championship: Pursuit of Greatness headliner.

=== Results ===
ONE Championship: Pursuit of Greatness
Weight Class				Method	Round	Time	Notes
Middleweight 93 kg	(Myanmar) Aung La Nsang (c)	def.	(Lebanon) Mohammad Karaki	TKO (Punches)	1	2:21	For the ONE Middleweight Championship
Featherweight 70 kg	(Malaysia) Keanu Subba	def.	(Myanmar) Phoe Thaw	Submission (Guillotine Choke)	1	2:47	
Cruiserweight 102 kg	(Morocco) Tarik Khbabez	def.	(Morocco) Ibrahim El Bouni	TKO (Punches)	3	2:26	Kickboxing
Catchweight (67 kg)	(Japan) Masakazu Imanari	def.	(Singapore) Radeem Rahman	Submission (Armbar)	1	1:23	
Bantamweight 66 kg	(China) Han Zihao	def.	(Philippines) Ryan Jakiri	KO (Punch)	1	1:39	Kickboxing
Flyweight 61 kg	(Myanmar) Ye Thway Ne	def.	(Myanmar) Mite Yine	Decision (Unanimous)	3	5:00	
Welterweight 84 kg	(Brazil) Luís Santos	def.	(Japan) Daichi Abe	KO (Liver Kick)	1	0:33	
Preliminary Card
Flyweight 61 kg	(Australia) Josh Tonna	def.	(Italy) Joseph Lasiri	Decision (Unanimous)	3	3:00	Kickboxing
Bantamweight 66 kg	(Afghanistan) Ahmad Qais Jasoor	def.	(China) Ma Xu Dong	KO (Punches)	2	2:16	
Flyweight 61 kg	(Indonesia) Rudy Agustian	def.	(Philippines) Kaji Ebin	Submission (Americana)	1	4:01	

== ONE Championship: Heart of the Lion ==
ONE: Heart of the Lion
- Promotion: ONE Championship
- Date: November 9, 2018
- Venue: Singapore Indoor Stadium
- City: Kallang, Singapore

ONE Championship: Heart of the Lion (also known as ONE Championship 81) was a mixed martial arts event held by ONE Championship on November 9, 2018 at the Singapore Indoor Stadium in Kallang, Singapore.

=== Background ===
This event featured a world title fight for the ONE Bantamweight Championship title unification, the interim champion Kevin Belingon take on the ONE Championship Bantamweight champion Bibiano Fernandes as ONE Championship: Pursuit of Greatness headliner.

Angela Lee was expected to face reigning flyweight champion Jingnan Xiong at ONE Championship: Heart of the Lion in an attempt to become the first female two-division champion in ONE Championship. However, on November 5, 2018, Lee revealed that she was forced off the card due to a back injury.

=== Results ===
ONE Championship: Heart of the Lion
Weight Class				Method	Round	Time	Notes
Bantamweight 66 kg	(Philippines) Kevin Belingon (ic)	def.	(Brazil) Bibiano Fernandes (c)	Decision (Split)	5	5:00	For the ONE Bantamweight Championship title Unification
Catchweight (73 kg)	(Canada) Christian Lee	def.	(Japan) Kazuki Tokudome	TKO (punches)	1	3:07	
Catchweight (71 kg)	(Italy) Giorgio Petrosyan	def.	(Thailand) Sorgraw Petchyindee	Decision (Unanimous)	3	3:00	Kickboxing
Women's Strawweight 57 kg	(Singapore) Tiffany Teo	def.	(Brazil) Michelle Nicolini	Decision (Unanimous)	3	5:00	
Lightweight 77 kg	(Australia) Adrian Pang	def.	(Japan) Kota Shimoishi	TKO (Cut)	1	5:00	
Featherweight 70 kg	(Thailand) Jo Nattawut	def.	(Scotland) George Mann	Decision (Unanimous)	3	3:00	Muay Thai
Bantamweight 66 kg	(Russia) Alaverdi Ramazanov	def.	(Scotland) Andrew Miller	TKO (Punches)	1	0:57	Muay Thai
Preliminary Card
Featherweight 70 kg	(United States) Garry Tonon	def.	(South Korea) Sung Jong Lee	Submission (Guillotine Choke)	2	2:04	
Strawweight 57 kg	(Thailand) Dejdamrong Sor Amnuaysirichoke	def.	(India) Himanshu Kaushik	Submission (Rear-Naked Choke)	2	4:45	
Bantamweight 66 kg	(Thailand) Muangthai P.K. Saenchaimuaythaigym	def.	(Cyprus) Panicos Yusuf	Decision (Unanimous)	3	3:00	Muay Thai
Bantamweight 66 kg	(Japan) Shuya Kamikubo	def.	(Malaysia) Muhammad Aiman	Decision (Unanimous)	3	5:00	
Bantamweight 66 kg	(China) Xie Bin	def.	(Malaysia) Hisyam Samsudin	Submission (D'arce Choke)	1	3:19	
Featherweight 70 kg	(Netherlands) Anthony Engelen	def.	(Cambodia) Meas Meul	KO (Head Kick)	1	0:39	

== ONE Championship: Warrior's Dream ==
ONE: Warrior's Dream
- Promotion: ONE Championship
- Date: November 17, 2018
- Venue: Stadium Istora
- City: Jakarta, Indonesia

ONE Championship: Warrior's Dream (also known as ONE Championship 82) was a mixed martial arts event held by ONE Championship on November 17, 2018 at the Stadium Istora in Jakarta, Indonesia.

=== Background ===
This event featured a world title fight for the vacant ONE Welterweight Championship, Swede top contender Zebaztian Kadestam take on the American Tyler McGuire as ONE Championship: Warrior's Dream headliner.

The co-main event featured the debut of former Glory Welterweight Champion Nieky Holzken in a catchweight bout against Cosmo Alexandre.

=== Results ===
ONE Championship: Warrior's Dream
Weight Class				Method	Round	Time	Notes
Welterweight 84 kg	(Sweden) Zebaztian Kadestam	def.	(United States) Tyler McGuire	KO (Punch and Knee)	5	4:32	For the Vacant ONE Welterweight Championship
Catchweight (78 kg)	(Netherlands) Nieky Holzken	def.	(Brazil) Cosmo Alexandre	KO (Punches)	2	2:59	Kickboxing
Atomweight 52 kg	(Indonesia) Priscilla Gaol	def.	(Philippines) Angelie Sabanal	Decision (Unanimous)	3	5:00	
Strawweight 57 kg	(Japan) Hayato Suzuki	def.	(Thailand) Pongsiri Mitsatit	Submission (Rear-Naked Choke)	1	2:09	
Flyweight 61 kg	(Thailand) Lerdsila Chumpairtour	def.	(Cambodia) Sok Thy	Decision (Unanimous)	3	3:00	Muay Thai
Catchweight (72 kg)	(Netherlands) Anthony Engelen	def.	(Philippines) Jimmy Yabo	Submission (Rear-Naked Choke)	1	2:35	
Catchweight (58.1 kg)	(Indonesia) Elipitua Siregar	def.	(Pakistan) Muhammad Imran	Submission (Rear-Naked Choke)	2	2:10	
Strawweight 57 kg	(Indonesia) Egi Rozten	def.	(Malaysia) Eddey Kalai	KO (Punch)	1	3:15	
Preliminary Card
Bantamweight 66 kg	(South Korea) Dae Hwan Kim	def.	(China) Zhao Zhi Kang	Decision (Unanimous)	3	5:00	
Flyweight 61 kg	(Japan) Tatsumitsu Wada	def.	(Philippines) Eugene Toquero	Submission (Rear-Naked Choke)	1	0:52	
Strawweight 57 kg	(Indonesia) Adrian Mattheis	def.	(Indonesia) Malik Abdul Aziz Calim Akbar	Submission (Guillotine Choke)	2	0:57	
Featherweight 70 kg	(Netherlands) Brown Pinas	def.	(France) Yohann Drai	KO (Spinning Back Elbow)	2	0:52	Muay Thai
Featherweight 70 kg	(Brazil) Bruno Pucci	def.	(China) Xie Chao	Submission (Guillotine Choke)	1	0:56	
Strawweight 57 kg	(Indonesia) Dwi Ani Retno Wulan	def.	(Indonesia) Putri Padmi	Decision (Unanimous)	3	5:00	

== ONE Championship: Conquest of Champions ==
ONE: Conquest of Champions
- Promotion: ONE Championship
- Date: November 23, 2018
- Venue: Mall of Asia Arena
- City: Pasay, Philippines

ONE Championship: Conquest of Champions (also known as ONE Championship 83) was a mixed martial arts event held by ONE Championship on November 23, 2018 at the Mall of Asia Arena in Pasay, Philippines.

=== Background ===
This event featured two title fights, first the highly anticipated return of ONE Championship Heavyweight champion Brandon Vera, who returned from a two-year hiatus to face Mauro Cerilli for the ONE Heavyweight Championship as the event headliner. And a bout for the vacant ONE Lightweight Championship between the former champ Eduard Folayang and top contender Amir Khan as co-headliner.

=== Fight Card ===
ONE Championship: Conquest of Champions
Weight Class				Method	Round	Time	Notes
Heavyweight 120 kg	(United States) Brandon Vera (c)	def.	(Italy) Mauro Cerilli	KO (Punch)	1	1:04	For the ONE Heavyweight Championship
Lightweight 77 kg	(Philippines) Eduard Folayang	def.	(Singapore) Amir Khan	Decision (Unanimous)	5	5:00	For the Vacant ONE Lightweight Championship
Lightweight 77 kg	(Philippines) Honorio Banario	def.	(India) Rahul Raju	Decision (Unanimous)	3	5:00	
Bantamweight 66 kg	(Thailand) Saemapetch Fairtex	def.	(Russia) Alaverdi Ramazanov	Decision (Unanimous)	3	3:00	Muay Thai
Welterweight 84 kg	(United States) James Nakashima	def.	(Russia) Raimond Magomedaliev	Decision (Unanimous)	3	5:00	
Bantamweight 66 kg	(Japan) Hiroaki Suzuki	def.	(Lithuania) Deividas Danyla	Decision (Unanimous)	3	3:00	Kickboxing
Preliminary Card
Catchweight (73 kg)	(France) Samy Sana	def.	(Armenia) Armen Petrosyan	Decision (Unanimous)	3	3:00	Kickboxing
Heavyweight 120 kg	(Brazil) Alexandre Machado	def.	(Japan) Hideki Sekine	TKO (Punches)	2	1:44	
Bantamweight 66 kg	(China) Han Zihao	def.	(Malaysia) Azwan Che Wil	TKO (Injury)	1	2:52	Muay Thai
Strawweight 57 kg	(Philippines) Jeremy Miado	def.	(China) Peng Xue Wen	TKO (Punches)	2	0:35	
Bantamweight 66 kg	(Japan) Akihiro Fujisawa	def.	(Philippines) Rocky Bactol	TKO (Elbows)	3	4:40	
Flyweight 61 kg	(Indonesia) Rudy Agustian	def.	(Bangladesh) Ashraful Islam	Decision (Unanimous)	3	5:00	

== ONE Championship: Destiny of Champions ==
ONE: Destiny of Champions
- Promotion: ONE Championship
- Date: December 7, 2018
- Venue: Axiata Arena
- City: Kuala Lumpur, Malaysia

ONE Championship: Destiny of Champions (also known as ONE Championship 84) was a mixed martial arts event held by ONE Championship on December 7, 2018 at the Axiata Arena in Kuala Lumpur, Malaysia.

=== Background ===
Charlie Peters was scheduled to face Phetmorakot Wor Sangprapai, but Peters was forced off the card on November 29 he suffered a slipped disk injury during his training. Fellow Englishman Liam Harrison served as Peters replacement.

=== Results ===
ONE Championship: Destiny of Champions
Weight Class				Method	Round	Time	Notes
Featherweight 70 kg	(Thailand) Yodsanklai Fairtex	def.	(Australia) Luis Regis	KO (Punches)	1	2:08	Muay Thai
Welterweight 84 kg	(Kyrgyzstan) Kiamrian Abbasov	def.	(Malaysia) Agilan Thani	Submission (Rear-Naked Choke)	1	2:35	
Atomweight 52 kg	(Malaysia) Jihin Radzuan	def.	(Taiwan) Jenny Huang	Decision (Unanimous)	3	5:00	
Featherweight 70 kg	(Thailand) Phetmorakot Wor Sangprapai	def.	(England) Liam Harrison	KO (Elbow)	2	1:15	Muay Thai
Middleweight 93 kg	(Russia) Vitaly Bigdash	def.	(Japan) Yuki Niimura	Submission (Reverse Triangle Armbar)	1	4:24	
Strawweight 57 kg	(Japan) Yosuke Saruta	def.	(Brazil) Alex Silva	Decision (Unanimous)	3	5:00	
Flyweight 61 kg	(Thailand) Panpayak Jitmuangnon	def.	(Portugal) Rui Botelho	Decision (Unanimous)	3	3:00	Muay Thai
Preliminary Card
Bantamweight 66 kg	(Malaysia) Mohammed bin Mahmood	def.	(Greece) Stergos Mikkios	KO (Punches)	1	2:20	Muay Thai
Atomweight 52 kg	(Japan) Mei Yamaguchi	def.	(Philippines) Jomary Torres	Decision (Unanimous)	3	5:00	
Flyweight 61 kg	(Cambodia) Chan Rothana	def.	(Indonesia) Abro Fernandes	TKO (Knee and Punches)	2	4:06	
Catchweight (63.5 kg)	(Cambodia) Sovannahry Em	def.	(Ukraine) Iryna Kyselova	TKO (Punches)	1	1:21	

== See also ==
- 2018 in UFC
- Bellator MMA in 2018
- 2018 in Rizin Fighting Federation
- 2018 in Absolute Championship Berkut
- 2018 in M-1 Global
- 2018 in Konfrontacja Sztuk Walki
- 2018 in LUX Fight League
- 2018 in Road FC
- 2018 in Glory
- 2018 in Glory of Heroes
- 2018 in Kunlun Fight
- 2018 in K-1
- 2018 in Romanian kickboxing
