= Adam Larfi =

Algerian-French martial artist

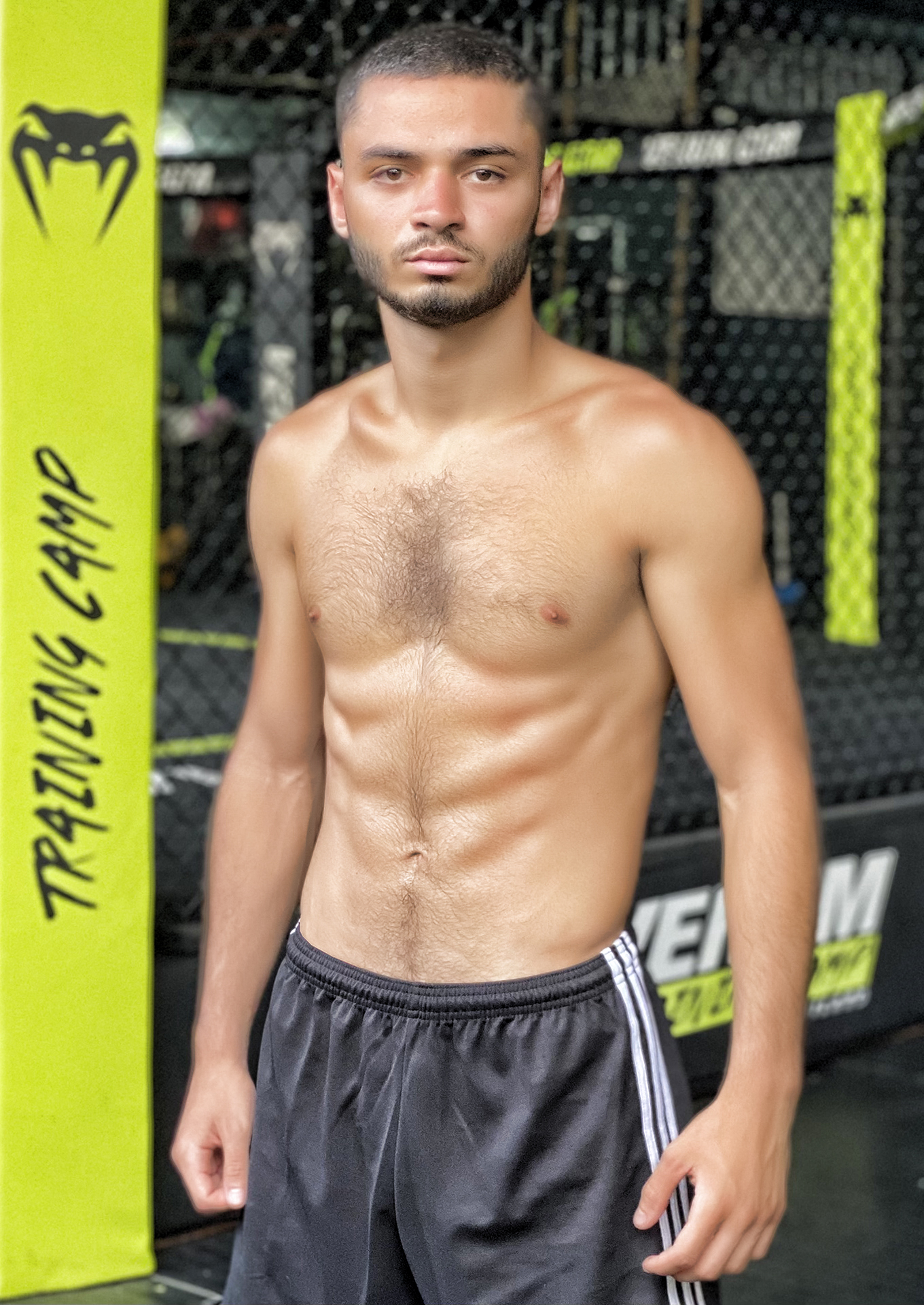
- Larfi in 2021
- Born: Adam Larfi; May 27, 1999 (age 27); Saint-Denis, France
- Other names: Adam Noi
- Height: 175 cm (5 ft 9 in)
- Weight: 63 kg (139 lb; 9 st 13 lb)
- Division: Bantamweight
- Style: Muay Thai, Kickboxing
- Fighting out of: Bangkok, Thailand
- Team: Venum Training Camp Thailand
- Trainer: Mehdi Zatout
- Years active: 2009-present

Kickboxing record
- Total: 65
- Wins: 52
- Losses: 11
- Draws: 2

Adam Larfi (born 27 May 1999), better known as Adam Noi, is a French-born Algerian Muay Thai kickboxer. He is also a former two-time IFMA Muay Thai World Champion in 2016 and 2019. Larfi is ranked #8 in the WBC Muaythai super lightweight rankings. He will fight for WBC Muay Thai Super lightweight world title.

== Biography and career ==
Noi was born in Saint-Denis, France to Algerian parents. Noi started exercising at the age of 10. He first practiced karate and judo but eventually turned to Muay Thai. He dropped out of school at the age of 14. He went to Thailand to learn Muay Thai and has lived there ever since. He fought in major Thai stadiums, including Lumpinee and Rajadamnern. Noi has two IFMA world titles and a European title. He is the current athlete of ONE Championship.

Noi also ranked in the WBC (World Boxing Council Muaythai). He was scheduled to fight with "Prince Junior" on November 7, 2020 for the Super Lightweight division of WMC (World Muaythai Council) World Championship. But the fight was postponed due to the COVID-19 pandemic.

== Karate Combat record ==
Res.	Record	Opponent	Method	Event	Date	Round	Time	Location	Notes
Loss	4–2	Giorgi Malania	KO (punch to the body)	RCC x Karate Combat Fight Night	October 17, 2026	2	1:54	Yekaterinburg, Russia	
Loss	4–1	Luiz Rocha	TKO (punches)	Karate Combat 60	May 27, 2026	1	2:14	Yekaterinburg, Russia	For the inaugural Karate Combat Featherweight Championship
Win	4–0	Ali Zanrifar	Decision (split)	Karate Combat 54	May 2, 2025	4	3:00	Dubai, United Arab Emirates	
Win	3–0	Juan David Rios	TKO (punches)	Karate Combat: Kickback 3	November 14, 2024	3	0:54	Bangkok, Thailand	
Win	2–0	Erik Pérez	Decision (unanimous)	Karate Combat 49	September 18, 2024	3	3:00	Singapore	
Win	1–0	Ali Motamed	Decision (unanimous)	Karate Combat 45	April 20, 2024	3	3:00	Dubai, United Arab Emirates	

== Muay Thai and Kickboxing record ==
Kickboxing and Muay Thai record
54 Wins (13 (T)KO's, 38 Decisions), 11 Losses (0 (T)KO's, 8 Decision), 2 Draws
Date	Result	Opponent	Event	Location	Method	Round	Time
2023-11-25	Loss	(China) Zhao Chongyang	Wu Lin Feng 1000th Broadcast Celebration	Tangshan, China	Decision (Unanimous)	3	3:00
2023-08-12	Loss	(Thailand) Luktum WinnerMuaythai	Rebellion Muaythai XXIX	Melbourne, Australia	Decision	5	3:00
2023-07-22	Loss	(Thailand) Tongnoi Lukbanyai	Rajadamnern World Series - Group Stage	Bangkok, Thailand	Decision (Unanimous)	3	3:00
2023-05-13	Loss	(Thailand) Buakhiao Por.Paoin	Rajadamnern World Series - Group Stage	Bangkok, Thailand	Decision (Unanimous)	3	3:00
2023-04-15	Win	(Thailand) StarBoy Petchkiatpetch	Rajadamnern World Series	Bangkok, Thailand	KO (High kick)	1	
2023-03-04	Win	(Cambodia) Tompeng Haha	Rajadamnern World Series	Bangkok, Thailand	Decision (Unanimous)	3	3:00
2022-02-12	Loss	(United Kingdom) Nathan Bendon	University of Bolton Stadium	Bolton, England	Decision (Majority)	5	3:00
For WBC Muay Thai World Super lightweight title.
2021-12-30	Win	(Thailand) Dansiam AyothayaFightGym	Petchyindee, Rangsit Stadium	Rangsit, Thailand	Decision	5	3:00
2021-10-09	Win	(Thailand) Daraek RevolutionPhuketMuayThai	Muay Hardcore	Thailand	Decision	3	3:00
2021-02-26	Loss	(China) Han Zihao	ONE Championship: Fists Of Fury 2	Kallang, Singapore	Decision (Unanimous)	3	3:00
2020-01-10	Win	(France) Victor Pinto	ONE Championship: A New Tomorrow	Bangkok, Thailand	Decision (Unanimous)	3	3:00
2019-11-30	Win	(Australia) Ramesh Habib	Rebellion Muay Thai XXIII	Melbourne, Australia	Decision	3	3:00
2019-07-20	Win	(Thailand) Yodphotong Sor Sanpasamit	Muaythai Singpatong Saturday	Phuket, Thailand	KO (Right Elbow)	1	
2019-06-18	Loss	(Thailand) Kompayak Teemuangloei	Petchnumnoi + Prestige Fight (Lumpinee)	Bangkok, Thailand	Decision	5	3:00
2019-02-20	Loss	(France) Antar Kacem	All Star Muay Thai	Paris, France	Decision	3	3:00
2019-01-27	Draw	(Thailand) Fapajak	Warriors Night	Courbevoie, France	Decision	5	3:00
2018-12-15	Win	(Spain) Jonathan Fabian	Top Team Fighters	Torre-Pacheco, Spain	Decision	3	3:00
2018-11-09	Win	(France) Anouar El Karkouri	Best Of Siam 14	Paris, France	Decision	3	3:00
2018-10-12	Win	(France) Aiman Al Radhi	All Star Muay-Thai	Aubervilliers, France	Decision	3	3:00
2018-08-28	Win	(Thailand) Petburapha Sor.Sakulpong	Petch Numnoi + Street Fight (Lumpinee)	Bangkok, Thailand	KO	4	
2018-05-05	Win	(Thailand) Petkaieko 13 Coins Gym	Warriors Night	Nanterre, France	Decision	3	3:00
2018-03-24	Win	(Algeria) Remy	Lumpinee World Champion	Bangkok, Thailand	Decision	5	3:00
2017-10-14	Win	(Morocco) Rehda Chtibi	Shock Muay 9	Saint-Denis, France	Decision	3	3:00
2017-09-24	Win	(Thailand) Petchsaimoon Kaaisansukgym	Max Muay Thai	Pattaya, Thailand	TKO (Right Push Kick)	3	
2017-02-26	Loss	(Thailand) Jakchai Phetpotong	Suek Wangingtong (Rajadamnern)	Bangkok, Thailand	Decision	5	3:00
2017-01-13	Draw	(Thailand) Seuadam Kongsittha	Muay Xtreme	Bangkok, Thailand	Decision	5	3:00
2016-09-21	Loss	(Thailand) Kaensuan Sasiprapa	Sasiprapa	Bangkok, Thailand	Decision	5	3:00
2016-09-02	Loss	(Kazakhstan) Jafar Petchsaman	Super Muaythai	Bangkok, Thailand	Decision	5	3:00
2016-08-12	Win	(Brazil) Renan Cortes	Queen's Birthday	Bangkok, Thailand	KO (Right Spinning Elbow)	4	
2016-07-31	Loss	(Thailand) Kaewta Banchamek	Super Muaythai	Bangkok, Thailand	Decision	5	3:00
2016-05-01	Win	(Algeria) Aguenehenai Amayas	Super Muaythai	Bangkok, Thailand	Decision	5	3:00
2016-03-18	Win	(Argentina) Adia Sitmonchai	Wanweraphon (Lumpinee)	Bangkok, Thailand	TKO (Low Kicks)	3	
Legend: Win Loss Draw/No contest Notes

Amateur Muay Thai record
Date	Result	Opponent	Event	Location	Method	Round	Time
2019-07-28	Win	(Lithuania) Matas Pultarazinskas	IFMA World Championships 2019, Final	Bangkok, Thailand	Decision (30-27)	3	
Wins 2019 IFMA World Championship -67kg Gold Medal.
2019-07-27	Win	(Thailand) Suchakhri Ruanthai	IFMA World Championships 2019, Semi Final	Bangkok, Thailand	Decision (29-28)	3	
2019-07-25	Win	(Mauritius) Mathieu Adrien	IFMA World Championships 2019, Quarter Final	Bangkok, Thailand	TKO (retirement)	1	
2016-05-27	Win	(Czech Republic) Václav Sivák	IFMA World Championships 2016 U-18, Final	Jonkoping, Sweden	Decision (29-28)	3	
Wins 2016 IFMA World Championship Junior -63.5kg Gold Medal.
2016-05-25	Win	(Uzbekistan) Islom Abdukarimov	IFMA World Championships 2016 U-18, Semi Final	Jonkoping, Sweden	Decision (29-28)	3	
2015-08-	Loss	(New Zealand) Jeff Kelly	IFMA Royal World Cup U-18	Bangkok, Thailand	Decision	3	
Legend: Win Loss Draw/No contest Notes

== See also ==
- WBC Muay Thai Super lightweight title
- 2019 IFMA World Muaythai Championships
