= Tessa de Kom =

Dutch female kickboxer

- Born: 4 November 2000 (age 25); Maassluis, Netherlands
- Height: 1.63 m (5 ft 4 in)
- Weight: 52 kg (115 lb; 8 st 3 lb)
- Style: Kickboxing
- Stance: Orthodox
- Fighting out of: Vlaardingen, Netherlands
- Team: Fightteam Vlaardingen
- Trainer: Ernst Moerkerken
- Years active: 2018-present

Kickboxing record
- Total: 27
- Wins: 23
- By knockout: 4
- Losses: 4

Other information
- Website: Instagram Youtube

Tessa de Kom (born November 4, 2000) is a Dutch kickboxer. She is the current Enfusion Women's Strawweight (-52 kg) and RISE Women's Flyweight (-52 kg) champion.

As of February 2026, de Kom was ranked as the sixth-best female pound for pound kickboxer in the world by Combat Press. As of March 2026, she was also ranked as the sixth-best female pound for pound kickboxer in the world by Beyond Kickboxing.

== Career ==
De Kom made her promotional debut with Enfusion against Rebecca Garside at Enfusion Cage Events 6 on September 3, 2022. She won the fight by unanimous decision. This victory earned her the chance to face Suhailey Albertus for the vacant Enfusion Women's Strawweight (-52 kg) title at Enfusion 110 on September 17, 2022. She captured the vacant belt by unanimous decision.

De Kom signed with Glory following this victory and made her debut with the promotion against the one-time Glory Women's Super Bantamweight title challenger Manazo Kobayashi at Glory Rivals 4 on December 25, 2022. She knocked Kobayashi down once in the first round, en route to winning the fight by unanimous decision.

De Kom faced promotional newcomer Giuliana Cosnard at Glory Rivals 5 on January 28, 2023. De Kom stepped in as a replacement for Sarah Moussadak, who withdrew with an injury.

De Kom challenged Manazo Kobayashi for the RISE Women's Flyweight (-52 kg) title at RISE 168 on May 28, 2023. She won the fight by unanimous decision, with scores of 50–47, 49–47 and 49–48 to capture the title.

De Kom faced Seina at RISE WORLD SERIES 2023 Final Round on December 16, 2023. She lost the fight by unanimous decision.

De Kom faced Eirini Chatziiosifidou for the IFP World Strawweight (-52 kg) title on May 18, 2024. She won the fight by decision.

De Kom defended her RISE Flyweight title against Arina Kobayashi at RISE 184 on December 15, 2024. She won the fight by unanimous decision.

De Kom defended her Enfusion Strawweight title against Kyara van der Klooster at Enfusion 148 in Dordrecht, the Netherlands on April 12, 2025. She won the fight by unanimous decision.

De Kom defended her RISE Flyweight title against Manazo Kobayashi at RISE 189 on June 29, 2025. She won the fight by unanimous decision.

== Championships and accomplishments ==
=== Muay Thai ===
- International Federation of Muaythai Associations
  - (silver) 2022 IFMA European U23 Championships (-54 kg)
- Patong Stadium
  - 2026 Patong Stadium 126 lbs Champion

=== Kickboxing ===
- Enfusion
  - 2022 Enfusion Women's Strawweight (-52 kg) Championship
    - One successful defense
- RISE
  - 2023 RISE Women's Flyweight (-52 kg) Championship
    - Three successful title defenses
- International Fight Promotion
  - 2024 IFP World Strawweight (-52 kg) Champion
  - 2026 IFP World Strawweight (-52 kg) Champion
- International Combat Organisation
  - 2025 ICO K-1 World -53 kg Champion

== Kickboxing record ==
Professional Kickboxing Record
24 Wins (5 (T)KO's), 4 Losses, 0 Draw
Date	Result	Opponent	Event	Location	Method	Round	Time
2026-10-17	Win	(Japan) Yaya Weerasakreck	RISE 202	Tokyo, Japan	KO (Knees)	4	0:11
Defended the RISE Women's Flyweight (-52 kg) title.
2026-05-23	Win	(China) Liu Yueer	IFP Fight Series #5	Essen, Germany	KO (Knee to the body)	4	2:36
Wins the vacant IFP World Strawweight (-52kg) title.
2026-04-24	Win	(Italy) Giorgia Pieropan	ONE Friday Fights 151, Lumpinee Stadium	Bangkok, Thailand	Decision (Unanimous)	3	3:00
2026-03-11	Win	(Serbia) Katarina Starjnic	Patong Boxing Stadium	Phuket, Thailand	Decision (Unanimous)	5	2:00
Wins the vacant Patong Stadium 125 lbs title.
2026-02-18	Win	(Thailand)	Bangla Stadium	Phuket, Thailand	KO (Left hook to the body)	1	
2025-09-27	Loss	(Greece) Antonia Prifti	IFP Fight Series	Genk, Belgium	Decision (Split)	5	3:00
Loses the IFP World Strawweight (-52kg) title.
2025-07-30	Win	(Kyrgyzstan) Almagul Zhorobekova	Bangla Stadium	Phuket, Thailand	TKO		
2025-06-29	Win	(Japan) Manazo Kobayashi	RISE 189	Tokyo, Japan	Decision (Unanimous)	5	3:00
Defends the RISE Women's Flyweight (-52 kg) title.
2025-04-12	Win	(Netherlands) Kyara van der Klooster	Enfusion 148	Dordrecht, Netherlands	Decision (Unanimous)	5	3:00
Defends the Enfusion Women's Strawweight (-52 kg) title.
2025-02-08	Win	(Italy) Giuliana Parisi	Kumit K Event 4	Sant'Agata li Battiati, Italy	TKO (retirement)	4	3:00
Wins the vacant ICO K-1 World -53kg title.
2024-12-15	Win	(Japan) Arina Kobayashi	RISE 184	Tokyo, Japan	Decision (Unanimous)	5	3:00
Defends the RISE Women's Flyweight (-52 kg) title.
2024-05-18	Win	(Greece) Eirini Chatziiosifidou	IFP Fight Series + Enfusion Rookies	Darmstadt, Germany	Decision	5	2:00
Wins the IFP World Strawweight (-52kg) title.
2023-12-16	Loss	(Japan) Seina	RISE World Series 2023 - Final Round	Tokyo, Japan	Decision (Unanimous)	3	3:00
2023-09-23	Win	(Germany) Angi Mathea	Fair FC 14	Duisburg, Germany	Decision (Unanimous)	3	3:00
2023-05-28	Win	(Japan) Manazo Kobayashi	RISE 168	Tokyo, Japan	Decision (Unanimous)	5	3:00
Wins the RISE Women's Flyweight (-52 kg) title.
2023-01-28	Loss	(Argentina) Giuliana Cosnard	Glory Rivals 5	Tulum, Mexico	Decision (Unanimous)	3	3:00
2022-12-25	Win	(Japan) Manazo Kobayashi	Glory Rivals 4	Tokyo, Japan	Decision (Unanimous)	3	3:00
2022-09-17	Win	(Dominican Republic) Suhailey Albertus	Enfusion 110	Alkmaar, Netherlands	Decision (Unanimous)	5	2:00
Wins the vacant Enfusion Women's Strawweight (-52 kg) title.
2022-06-05	Win	(Germany) Milena Belimov	ECE IFP / Enfusion Germany	Darmstadt, Germany	Decision (Unanimous)	3	3:00
2022-04-03	Win	(Netherlands) Montana Aerts	WFL	Almere, Netherlands	Decision (Unanimous)	3	3:00
2022-01-22	Win	(Netherlands) Kyara van der Klooster	Be A Fighter Part 7	Bochum, Germany	Decision (Unanimous)	3	3:00
2021-09-03	Win	(England) Rebecca Garside	Enfusion Cage Events 6	Alkmaar, Netherlands	Decision (Unanimous)	3	3:00
2020-09-19	Win	(Greece) Argiro Galani	Enfusion 97	Alkmaar, Netherlands	Decision (Unanimous)	3	3:00
Legend: Win Loss Draw/No contest Notes

Amateur Kickboxing Record
Date	Result	Opponent	Event	Location	Method	Round	Time
2024-11-04	Loss	(Ukraine) Daryva Ivanova	2024 WAKO European Championships, Quarterfinals	Athens, Greece	Decision (Split)	3	2:00
2022-02-14	Loss	(Turkey) Ezgi Keles	2022 IFMA European U23 Championships, Tournament Final	Istanbul, Turkey	Decision (Unanimous)	3	2:00
Wins the 2022 IFMA European U23 Championships -54 kg Silver Medal.
2022-02-12	Win	(Sweden) Moa Carlsson	2022 IFMA European U23 Championships, Tournament Semifinal	Istanbul, Turkey	Decision (Unanimous)	3	2:00
2019-11-02	Win	(Netherlands) Bibi van Santen	Tribe Events	Netherlands	Decision (Unanimous)	3	1:30
2018-05-06	Loss	(Netherlands) Jody Munja	Ypenburg Fightday 13 Exclusive	The Hague, Netherlands	Decision (Unanimous)	3	1:30
2018-04-01	Win	(Netherlands) Giulia Klamer	Power Women By Dodi	Amsterdam, Netherlands	Decision (Unanimous)	3	1:30
Legend: Win Loss Draw/No contest Notes

== See also ==
- List of current GLORY fighters
- List of female kickboxers
