= Václav Sivák =

Czech kickboxer

- Born: 27 May 1999 (age 27); Ostrava, Czech Republic
- Other names: Bad
- Height: 177 cm (5 ft 10 in)
- Weight: 67 kg (148 lb; 10.6 st)
- Division: Welterweight
- Fighting out of: Ostrava, Czech Republic
- Team: Hamr Gym; Lanna Gym; Como3 Ostrava (former)
- Trainer: Petr Mahr; Viktor Petrlík; Martin Vaňka (former)

Professional boxing record
- Total: 2
- Wins: 2
- By knockout: 1
- Losses: 0

Kickboxing record
- Total: 36
- Wins: 36
- By knockout: 15
- Losses: 0

Other information
- Website: //www.vaclavsivak.cz/
- Boxing record from BoxRec

Václav Sivák (born 27 May 1999) is a Czech professional kickboxer who competes in welterweight division. He is current WAKO-PRO World Light Welterweight Champion.

== Biography career ==
Václav Sivák was in Ostrava, Czech Republic grew with in an excluded Romani locality in Ostrava-Vítkovice. Sivák started practicing karate at age 6 however, he was often disqualified for hitting too hard. At age of 11, he transitioned to Muay Thai. At age of 16 he moved to Hamr Gym in Ostrava. Under guidance of his coach Viktor Petrlík he amassed a 94–5 amateur kickboxing record. As a teen, he belonged to local Roma gang but thanks to his father, he got into martial arts.

In 2019 Sivak became first Czech to win a gold medal at senior WAKO World Championships. Sivak faced Lukas Mandinec at XFN Muay Thai Evening X 9 February 2019. He won fight unanimous decision. Sivak extended his winning streak with an extra round decision win Mochamed Machaev at XFN Legends 29 March 2019.

On 19 April 2018, Sivák faced Fang Feida in collaborative event between XFN and Wu Lin Feng. He won fight decision.

Sivák faced Benjamin Horvath at Double Red XFN 14 December 2019. He won fight a first-round knockout, stopping Horvath with a left knee to body.

Sivák faced Ali El saleh at Night of Warriors event 19 December 2020, in his sole fight of year. Sivak won first knockout flooring his opponent with a left hook to body.

On 22 January 2021, it was announced that Sivák would face Bailey Sugden at Oktagon Underground: Last Man Standing on 27 February 2021, in quarterfinals of Oktagon 70 kg tournament. bout was contested at 70 kilograms, 6.5 above Sivák's usual weight. He won fight unanimous decision. Despite winning quarterfinal bout, he was forced to withdraw from tournament due to a leg injury.

On 18 March 2021, Sivák revealed that he would his Road to ONE debut against Marian-Florin Soare at Night of Warriors 17 on 24 April 2021. He won fight a first-round knockout, staggering Soare with a knee to body, before finishing him with a flurry of punches.

Sivák was booked to face Fouad Djebari Fouad Djebari for WAKO Pro World K-1 (-64.5 kg) title, his first major professional title, at Yangames Fight Night 9 on 29 July 2021. He withdrew from bout week before, in order to fully heal from injuries he sustained in his fight with Sugden. title fight was rescheduled for Night of Warriors 4 20 November 2021. Sivák won fight unanimous decision.

Sivák faced Viktor Mikhailov at Fair Fight XVI 12 February 2022. He won fight unanimous decision. Sivák faced Alexis Laugeois at RFA 5 29 October 2022, in his second kickboxing bout of year. He won fight unanimous decision. Sivák faced Vladimír Lengál at Heroes Gate 26 20 November 2022. He won fight unanimous decision.

Sivák faced Patrik Záděra for vacant RFA K-1 -66 kg championship at RFA 7 on 17 December 2022. He won fight unanimous decision. Sivák scored sole knockdown of fight in third round, as he dropped his opponent with a head kick.

Sivák was expected to challenge Kiamran Nabati for Fair Fight featherweight (-65 kg) title at RCC Fair Fight 20 18 February 2023. He withdrew from bout 10 February 2023, after suffering a hand injury.

Sivák made his first RFA K-1 -66 kg title defense against Ruslan Toktharov at RFA 10 13 May 2023. Although Toktharov missed weight 2 kg at official weigh-ins, fight was still contested as a title bout, with stipulation that Toktharov couldn't weigh more than 68 kg on fight night. Sivák won fight a fourth-round technical knockout.

Sivák was expected to his first WAKO Pro World K-1 Light Welterweight (-64.5 kg) title defense against former WAKO K-1 titleholder Eddy Nait Slimani at Yangames Fight Night 29 July 2023. He withdrew from fight July 28, as a pre-fight examination revealed he had two displaced bones in hand he previously injured while preparing for Nabati bout.

Sivák faced Christopher Hopp at RFA 14 2 December 2023. He won fight unanimous decision.

Sivák made his first WAKO-PRO World K-1 Light Welterweight (-64.5 kg) championship defense against Anass Ahmidouch at Lucerna Boxing 15 on 30 December 2023. He won fight unanimous decision.

Sivák faced Michał Królik at XTB KSW Epic: Chalidow Adamek 24 February 2024. He won bout via unanimous decision.

Sivák made his second RFA K-1 -66 kg title defense against Ruslan Toktharov at Adam Król on 16 April 2024. He won fight unanimous decision.

Sivák was expected to face Andrej Kedveš at Gladiators Fight Night 2 18 May 2024. He withdrew from bout with an undisclosed injury 17 May.

Sivák faced Konstantin Stoykov at RFA x IAF: Special Title Night 2 on 28 September 2024. He won fight a second-round technical knockout.

Sivák is scheduled to his third RFA K-1 -66 kg title defense against László Farkas at RFA 16 19 October 2024. Sivák came to weigh in more than 3 kg contracted limit. He was stripped of his title, bout would still happen with only Farkas eligible to win belt. Sivák won fight fifth-round knockout.

Sivák faced Patrik Záděra for the vacant RFA K-1 -70 kg championship at RFA 20 on March 14, 2025. Záděra came in 1.1 kg overweight and was ineligible to win the title. Sivák won the fight by a fifth-round knockout.

Sivák faced Johannes Baas at KO-Warriors 2 on June 25, 2025. He won the fight by a closely contested split decision.

Sivák made his first RFA K-1 -70 kg title defense against Angelo Volpe at RFA 24 on September 25, 2025. He retained the title by split decision.

Sivák made his second RFA K-1 -70 kg title defense against Yasuhiro Kido at RFA 29 on March 20, 2026.

== Championships achievements ==
=== Professional ===
- World Association of Kickboxing Organizations
  - 2021 WAKO Pro K-1 World Light Welterweight (-64.5 kg) Championship
    - successful title defense
- Real Fight Arena
  - 2022 RFA K-1 -66 kg Championship
    - One successful title defense
  - 2025 RFA K-1 -70 kg Championship
    - Three successful title defenses

=== Amateur ===
- Czech Federation
  - 6x Czech K-1 & Muay Thai National Champion
- International Federation of Muaythai Associations
  - 2016 IFMA World Cup in Kazan Junior -63.5 kg (bronze)
  - 2016 IFMA World Championships Junior -63.5 kg (silver)
- World Association of Kickboxing Organizations
  - 2x WAKO Slovak Open K-1 (2018, 2020)
  - 2x WAKO Czech Open K-1 (2017, 2018)
  - 2015 WAKO European Cup K-1 Youth (gold)
  - 2017 WAKO Hungary World Cup K-1 Young Junior -63.5 kg (gold)
  - 2017 WAKO European Championships K-1 Older Junior -63.5 kg (gold)
  - 2018 WAKO Hungary World Cup K-1 Older Junior -63.5 kg (silver)
  - 2018 WAKO European Championships Senior K-1 -63.5 kg (bronze)
  - 2019 WAKO World Championships Senior K-1 -63.5 kg (gold)
  - 2020 WAKO WGP -67 kg Champion
- World Martial Arts Committee
  - 2019 WMAC World Games K-1 -65 kg (gold)

== Kickboxing Muay Thai record ==
Professional Kickboxing record
36 Wins (15 (T)KO's), 0 Loss, 0 draw
Date	Result	Opponent	Event	Location	Method	Round	Time
2026-10-17	Win	(Curaçao) Brandon Fos	RFA 34	Zilina, Slovakia	KO (low kick)	3	3:00
Defends the RFA K-1 -70 kg Championship.
2026-03-20	Win	(Japan) Yasuhiro Kido	RFA 29	Bratislava, Slovakia	Decision (Unanimous)	5	3:00
Defends the RFA K-1 -70 kg Championship.
2025-09-26	Win	(Italy) Angelo Volpe	RFA 24	Bratislava, Slovakia	Decision (Split)	5	3:00
Defends the RFA K-1 -70 kg Championship.
2025-06-25	Win	(Germany) Johannes Baas	KO-Warriors 2	Prague, Czech Republic	Decision (Split)	3	3:00
2025-03-14	Win	(Czech Republic) Patrik Záděra	RFA 20	Bratislava, Slovakia	Decision (Unanimous)	5	3:00
Wins the vacant RFA K-1 -70 kg Championship.
2024-10-19	Win	(Hungary) László Farkas	RFA 18	Žilina, Slovakia	KO (Left hook to body)	5	0:55
Sivak came in 3kg over the limit and was stripped of his RFA K-1 -66 kg title.
2024-09-28	Win	(Bulgaria) Konstantin Stoykov	RFA x IAF: Special Title Night 2	Prague, Czech Republic	TKO (Body shot)	2	2:35
2024-04-13	Win	(Czech Republic) Adam Król	RFA 16	Opava, Czech Republic	Decision (Unanimous)	5	3:00
Defends RFA K-1 -66 kg Championship.
2024-02-24	Win	(Poland) Michał Królik	XTB KSW Epic: Chalidow Adamek	Gliwice, Poland	Decision (Unanimous)	3	3:00
2023-12-30	Win	(Morocco) Anass Ahmidouch	Lucerna Boxing 15	Prague, Czech Republic	Decision (Unanimous)	5	3:00
Defends WAKO-PRO World K-1 Light Welterweight (-64.5 kg) Championship.
2023-12-02	Win	(Germany) Christopher Hopp	RFA 14	Košice, Czech Republic	Decision (Unanimous)	3	3:00
2023-05-13	Win	(Austria) Ruslan Toktharov	RFA 10	Havířov, Czech Republic	TKO (Knee to body)	4	
Defends RFA K-1 -66 kg Championship.
2022-12-17	Win	(Czech Republic) Patrik Záděra	RFA 7	Prague, Czech Republic	Decision (Unanimous)	4	3:00
Wins vacant RFA K-1 -66 kg Championship.
2022-11-20	Win	(Czech Republic) Vladimír Lengál	Heroes Gate 26	Prague, Czech Republic	Decision (Unanimous)	3	3:00
2022-10-29	Win	(France) Alexis Laugeois	Real Fight Arena 5	Brno, Czech Republic	Decision (Unanimous)	3	3:00
2022-02-12	Win	(Russia) Viktor Mikhailov	Fair Fight 16	Yekaterinburg, Russia	Decision (unanimous)	3	3:00
2021-11-20	Win	(France) Fouad Jebbari	Night of Warriors	Liberec, Czech Republic	Decision (unanimous)	5	3:00
Wins vacant WAKO-PRO World K-1 Light Welterweight (-64.5 kg) Championship.
2021-04-24	Win	(Romania) Marian-Florin Soare	Road to ONE 8: Night of Warriors	Prague, Czech Republic	KO (body knee)	1	1:36
2021-02-27	Win	(United Kingdom) Bailey Sugden	Oktagon Underground - Last Man Standing, Quarter Final	Prague, Czech Republic	Decision (majority)	3	3:00
Sivak withdrew from tournament due to injury.
2020-12-19	Win	(Palestine) Ali El Saleh	Night of Warriors	Prague, Czech Republic	KO (body shot)	1	2:30
2019-12-14	Win	(Austria) Benjamin Horvath	Double Red XFN	Bratislava, Slovakia	KO (body knee)	1	2:39
2019-11-16	Win	(Thailand) Deo Phetsangkhat	Battle of Frýdlant 9	Frýdlant, Czech Republic	Decision	3	3:00
2019-09-20	Win	(Slovakia) Samuel Hadzima	XFN Legends	Prague, Czech Republic	Decision (unanimous)	3	3:00
2019-03-29	Win	(Austria) Mochamed Machaev	XFN Legends	Prague, Czech Republic	Ext. R Decision	4	3:00
2019-02-09	Win	(Slovakia) Lukas Mandinec	XFN Muay Thai Evening X	Slovakia	Decision	3	3:00
2018-04-19	Win	(China) Fang Feida	WLF: Czech Republic . China	Prague, Czech Republic	Decision	3	3:00
Legend: Win Loss Draw/No contest Notes

Amateur Muay Thai & Kickboxing record
94 Wins, 5 Losses
Date	Result	Opponent	Event	Location	Method	Round	Time
2019-10-25	Win	(Kazakhstan) Tlemissov Chingiskhan	2019 WAKO World Championships, Final	Sarajevo, Bosnia Herzegovina	Decision (split)	3	2:00
Won 2019 WAKO World Championships K-1 -63.5kg Gold Medal.
2019-10-	Win	(Hungary) Antoine Habash	2019 WAKO World Championships, Semi Final	Sarajevo, Bosnia Herzegovina	Decision (unanimous)	3	2:00
2019-10-	Win	(Russia) Ivan Avdeev	2019 WAKO World Championships, Quarter Final	Sarajevo, Bosnia Herzegovina	Decision (split)	3	2:00
2019-10-	Win	(Brazil) Jorge Ricardo Menezes da Silva	2019 WAKO World Championships, Second Round	Sarajevo, Bosnia Herzegovina	Decision (unanimous)	3	2:00
2019-10-22	Win	(Azerbaijan) Elmir Aliyev	2019 WAKO World Championships, First Round	Sarajevo, Bosnia Herzegovina	Decision (unanimous)	3	2:00
2018-10-	Loss	(Ukraine) Orfan Sananzade	2018 WAKO European Championships, Semi Final	Bratislava, Slovakia	Decision (unanimous)	3	2:00
Won 2018 WAKO European Championships -63.5kg bronze Medal.
2018-10-	Win	(Belarus) Yury Zhukouski	2018 WAKO European Championships, Quarter Final	Bratislava, Slovakia	Decision (split)	3	2:00
2018-10-	Win	(Portugal) Artur Baptista	2018 WAKO European Championships, First Round	Bratislava, Slovakia	Decision (unanimous)	3	2:00
2018-05-	Loss	(Ukraine) Kostiantyn Sabar	2018 Hungarian Kickboxing World Cup, Final	Budapest, Hungary	Decision (split)	3	2:00
Won 2017 Hungarian Kickboxing World Cup K-1 -63.5kg Silver Medal.
2018-05-	Win	(Ukraine) Zakhar Pavelko	2018 Hungarian Kickboxing World Cup, Semifinal	Budapest, Hungary	Decision	3	2:00
2017-09-10	Win	(Ukraine) Oleksandr Hoshev	2017 WAKO European Junior Championships, Final	Skopje, Macedonia	Decision (unanimous)	3	2:00
Won 2017 WAKO European Junior Championships K-1 -63.5kg Gold Medal.
2017-09-08	Win	(Bulgaria) Konstantin Mihailov	2017 WAKO European Junior Championships, Semifinal	Skopje, Macedonia	Decision (unanimous)	3	2:00
2017-09-06	Win	(Poland) Kamil Kryzaniak	2017 WAKO European Junior Championships, Quarterfinal	Skopje, Macedonia	Decision (unanimous)	3	2:00
2017-05-21	Win	(Hungary) Ádám Sándor	2017 Hungarian Kickboxing World Cup, Final	Budapest, Hungary	Decision (unanimous)	3	2:00
Won 2017 Hungarian Kickboxing World Cup K-1 -63.5kg Gold Medal.
2017-05-20	Win	(Israel) Abu Raiya Anan	2017 Hungarian Kickboxing World Cup, Semifinal	Budapest, Hungary	Decision (unanimous)	3	2:00
2016-05-27	Loss	(Algeria) Adam Larfi	IFMA World Championships 2016 U-18, Final	Jönköping, Sweden	Decision (29:28)	3	
Wins 2016 IFMA World Championship Junior -63.5kg Silver Medal.
2016-05-25	Win	(Belarus) Andrei ChyhIileichyk	IFMA World Championships 2016 U-18, Semi Final	Jönköping, Sweden	Decision (30:27)	3	
Legend: Win Loss Draw/No contest Notes

== Professional boxing record ==
2 fights	2 wins	0 losses
By knockout	1	0
By decision	1	0

No.	Result	Record	Opponent	Type	Round,	Date	Location	Notes
2	Win	2–0	(Czech Republic) Petr Gina	TKO	1 (4),	11 Mar 2018	DK Peklo, Plzeň, Czech Republic	
1	Win	1–0	(Czech Republic) Richard Walter	PTS	4 (4),	16 Nov 2017	KD na Rybníčku, Opava, Czech Republic	

=== Exhibition boxing record ===
No.	Result	Record	Opponent	Type	Round,	Date	Location	Notes
3	Win	1–0	(Denmark) Jonas Mågård	UD	4 (4)	21 May 2022	O2 Arena, Prague, Czech Republic	
