= Kai Ting Chuang =

Taiwanese martial arts fighter

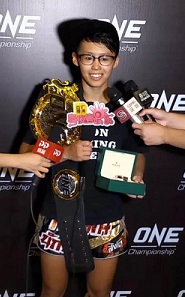
- Born: Chuang Kai Ting; March 25, 1995 (age 31); Changhua, Taiwan
- Nickname: Killer Bee
- Nationality: Taiwanese
- Height: 160 cm (5 ft 3 in)
- Weight: 52 kg (115 lb; 8 st 3 lb)
- Division: Atomweight
- Style: Kickboxing, Shootboxing
- Stance: Orthodox
- Fighting out of: Taichung, Taiwan
- Team: 雄聲格鬥 Kill fighting
- Years active: 2014–present

Kickboxing record
- Total: 24
- Wins: 17
- Losses: 7

Kai Ting Chuang (Chinese:莊凱婷, pinyin: zhuāng kǎi tíng), nicknamed Killer Bee, is a Taiwanese kickboxer. She is a former ONE Super Series Kickboxing Atomweight World Champion. She made her pro debut in 2014 in a shootboxing contest, but found her greatest success in the world of kickboxing.

== Background ==
Chuang’s parents divorced when she was just a baby, and her grandparents adopted her. When she began boxing in school, she lied to her grandmother so as not to be persuaded out of the sport.

Chuang began to box in the hopes of landing a university scholarship. As she excelled as a boxer, she completed her objective and attended the National Taiwan University of Sport. After just her freshman year, Chuang turned pro.

Now she trains out of Iron Boxing under the tutelage of former K-1 competitor Wang Chung Yaun.

== Kickboxing career ==
On August 2, 2014, Chuang competed at Shoot Boxing Girls S-Cup 2014. She would lose her debut by unanimous decision to Christina Jurjevic. She would return to shootboxing in 2015, but once again dropped a unanimous decision to Mio Tsumura.

After the setbacks in shootboxing, Chuang went back to her roots in kickboxing and Muay Thai where she found much greater success.

Chuang became a three-time WAKO kickboxing champion while compiling a record of 16–5.

Due to her success, Chuang was brought into ONE Championship to battle Thailand’s Yodcherry Sityodtong for the inaugural ONE Super Series Kickboxing Atomweight Championship. On July 7, 2018, Chuang defeated Yodcherry by unanimous decision to become a world champion.

On October 6, 2018, she defended the title against Stamp Fairtex. She would go on to lose the belt by unanimous decision.

On July 12, 2019, Chuang suffered her second consecutive defeat when she dropped a majority decision to Janet Todd at ONE Championship: Masters of Destiny.

== Championships and accomplishments ==
- ONE Championship
  - ONE Atomweight Kickboxing World Championship (One time)

== Fight record ==
Professional Kickboxing record
17 Wins, 7 Losses.
Date	Result	Opponent	Event	Location	Method	Round	Time
2019-07-12	Loss	(United States) Janet Todd	ONE Championship: Masters of Destiny	Kuala Lumpur, Malaysia	Decision (Majority)	3	3:00
2018-10-06	Loss	(Thailand) Stamp Fairtex	ONE Championship: Kingdom of Heroes	Bangkok, Thailand	Decision (Unanimous)	5	3:00
Loses the ONE Atomweight Kickboxing World Title
2018-07-07	Win	(Thailand) Yodcherry Sityodtong	ONE Championship: Battle for the Heavens	Guangzhou, China	Decision (Unanimous)	5	3:00
Wins the inaugural ONE Atomweight Kickboxing World Title
2018-02-12	Loss	(Japan) Manazo Kobayashi	KNOCK OUT FIRST IMPACT	Tokyo, Japan	Decision (Majority)	5	3:00
2016-09-30	Loss	(Japan) KANA	Krush 69	Tokyo, Japan	KO (Kick)	3	2:29
For the Krush Flyweight title.
2016-01-17	Win	(Japan) Little Tiger	Krush 62	Tokyo, Japan	Decision (Unanimous)	3	3:00
2015-05-24	Loss	(Japan) MIO	Onna Matsuri 2015: ~J-Girls x Shoot Boxing~	Tokyo, Japan	Decision (Unanimous)	3	3:00
2014-08-02	Loss	(Australia) Christina Jurjevic	Shoot Boxing Girls S-Cup 2014	Tokyo, Japan	Decision (Unanimous)	3	2:00
Legend: Win Loss Draw/No contest Notes

== See also ==
- List of current ONE fighters
- List of female kickboxers
