= Seina (kickboxer) =

Japanese kickboxer

- Born: November 16, 2001 (age 24); Higashiōsaka, Japan
- Height: 164 cm (5 ft 4 1/2 in)
- Weight: 52 kg (115 lb; 8 st 3 lb)
- Style: Kickboxing
- Stance: Orthodox
- Team: Sakigake Jyuku
- Years active: 2017 - 2025

Kickboxing record
- Total: 20
- Wins: 13
- By knockout: 2
- Losses: 5
- By knockout: 0
- Draws: 2

Seina (Japanese: 聖愛, born November 16, 2001) is a Japanese retired professional kickboxer. She is the former RISE Women's Bantam weight champion.

As of February 2024, she was ranked as the tenth best women's bantamweight kickboxer in the world by Beyond Kickboxing.

== Kickboxing career ==
=== RISE Women's Bantamweight champion ===
==== RISE Women's Bantamweight tournament ====
On April 23, 2023, it was announced that a RISE Women's bantamweight tournament would be held to crown the inaugural champion.

Seina faced Yura Kamiya at RISE 168 on May 28, 2023. She won the semifinal bout by unanimous decision.

Seina faced Yuka Murakami in the tournament final, which was scheduled as the main event of RISE 170 on July 30, 2023. She won the fight by unanimous decision.

==== Title reign ====
Seina faced Tessa de Kom at RISE WORLD SERIES 2023 Final Round on December 16, 2023. She won the fight by unanimous decision.

Seina announced her retirement and vacated the RISE Women's Bantamweight Championship on January 8, 2026.

== Championships and accomplishments ==
- RISE
  - RISE Women's Bantamweight champion

== Kickboxing record ==
Professional Kickboxing Record
13 Wins (2 (T)KOs), 5 Losses, 2 Draws
Date	Result	Opponent	Event	Location	Method	Round	Time
2023-12-16	Win	(Netherlands) Tessa de Kom	RISE World Series 2023 - Final Round	Tokyo, Japan	Decision (Unanimous)	3	3:00
2023-07-30	Win	(Japan) Yuka Murakami	RISE 170	Tokyo, Japan	Decision (Unanimous)	5	3:00
Wins the RISE Women's Bantamweight Championship.
2023-05-28	Win	(Japan) Yura Kamiya	RISE 168	Tokyo, Japan	Decision (Unanimous)	3	3:00
2022-10-30	Loss	(Japan) Yuka Murakami	RISE 162	Tokyo, Japan	Decision (Unanimous)	3	3:00
2022-03-27	Win	(Japan) RINA	BOMBERS 002	Tokyo, Japan	Decision (Unanimous)	5	2:00
2022-02-12	Loss	(Japan) KOKOZ	RISE EVOL 10＆RISE GIRLS POWER 6	Tokyo, Japan	Ext.R Decision (Unanimous)	4	3:00
2021-10-17	Win	(Japan) Suzuka Tabuchi	Hoost Cup Kings Kyoto 8	Kyoto, Japan	Decision (Unanimous)	3	3:00
2021-05-23	Loss	(Japan) YAYA	RISE 149	Tokyo, Japan	Decision (Unanimous)	3	3:00
2021-01-31	Draw	(Japan) Imari	DEEP☆KICK Minerva Osaka Tournament	Izumiōtsu, Japan	Decision (Split)	5	3:00
2020-09-20	Loss	(Japan) Madoka Jinnai	RISE GIRLS POWER 3	Tokyo, Japan	Decision (Unanimous)	3	3:00
2020-02-09	Win	(Japan) Iori Miyagawa	DEEP☆KICK 42	Osaka, Japan	Decision (Unanimous)	3	3:00
2019-12-22	Win	(Japan) Kurumi	DEEP JEWELS 27	Osaka, Japan	TKO (Body Kicks)	1	1:19
2019-11-08	Win	(Japan) Maki Goto	RISE GIRLS POWER	Tokyo, Japan	Decision (Majority)	3	3:00
2019-09-15	Win	(Japan) Masami	DEEP☆KICK 40	Izumiōtsu, Japan	Decision (Unanimous)	3	2:00
2019-06-19	Win	(Japan) Kaede Hoshino	Minerva Ladies Tournament	Osaka, Japan	TKO (Two Knockdown Rule)	1	1:43
2019-02-24	Win	(Japan) Emi NFC	NJKF 2019 west 1st	Osaka, Japan	Decision (Unanimous)	3	2:00
2018-12-16	Loss	(Japan) Miki Kitamura	NJKF 2018 west 4th	Osaka, Japan	Decision (Unanimous)	3	3:00
2018-08-19	Draw	(Japan) Tsubasa	NJKF WEST Young Fight 4th	Osaka, Japan	Decision (Majority)	3	2:00
2018-04-29	Win	(Japan) Hitomi Nagai	NKB Fighting Spirit Series Young Fight Z-1 Carnival	Osaka, Japan	Decision (Majority)	3	3:00
2017-12-17	Win	(Japan) Megumi	DEEP☆KICK 34	Osaka, Japan	Decision (Unanimous)	3	2:00
Legend: Win Loss Draw/No contest Notes

== See also ==
- List of female kickboxers
