= ONE Fight Night 10 =

Combat sport events in 2023

ONE Fight Night 10: Johnson vs. Moraes 3
- The poster for ONE Fight Night 10: Johnson vs. Moraes 3
- Promotion: ONE Championship
- Date: May 5, 2023
- Venue: 1stBank Center
- City: Broomfield, Colorado, United States

Event chronology
| ONE Friday Fights 15: Nakrob vs. Ploywitthaya | ONE Fight Night 10: Johnson vs. Moraes 3 | ONE Friday Fights 16: ET vs. Kongthoranee |

ONE Fight Night 10: Johnson vs. Moraes 3 was a combat sport event produced by ONE Championship that took place on May 5, 2023, at the 1stBank Center in Broomfield, Colorado, United States.

== Background ==
The event marked the promotion's first event hosted in the United States and was broadcast live on Amazon Prime Video. Colorado was chosen for the US debut because its athletic commission was the first to approve ONE's rule set.

A ONE Flyweight World Championship trilogy bout between current champion Demetrious Johnson (also former UFC Flyweight Champion and 2019 ONE Flyweight World Grand Prix Champion) and Adriano Moraes headlined the event. The pairing first met at ONE on TNT 1 on April 7, 2021, where Moraes won by knockout in the second round. Their second meeting took place at ONE on Prime Video 1 on August 27, 2022, where Johnson won by knockout in the fourth round.

A ONE Flyweight Muay Thai World Championship bout between current champion Rodtang Jitmuangnon and Edgar Tabares took place at the event.

A ONE Flyweight Submission Grappling World Championship bout between current champion Mikey Musumeci and Osamah Almarwai also took place at the event.

A middleweight bout between former ONE Middleweight and Light Heavyweight World Champion Aung La Nsang and Fan Rong took place at the event. The pairing was previously scheduled to meet at ONE Fight Night 6, but Rong withdrew due to tested positive for COVID-19.

A submission grappling superfight took place during the event featuring current ONE Middleweight Champion Reinier de Ridder (also former ONE Light Heavyweight World Champion) and ADCC bronze medallist Tye Ruotolo.

At weigh-ins, Jackie Buntan (131 lbs) and Diandra Martin (126 lbs) both missed weight. Their bout proceeded at a catchweight of 131 lbs.

== Results ==
Main card (Amazon Prime Video)
| Weight class | | | | Method | Round | Time | Notes |
|---|---|---|---|---|---|---|---|
| Flyweight | Demetrious Johnson (c) | def. | Adriano Moraes | Decision (unanimous) | 5 | 5:00 | (Note: For the ONE Flyweight World Championship.) |
| Flyweight Muay Thai | Rodtang Jitmuangnon (c) | def. | Edgar Tabares | KO (elbow) | 2 | 1:34 | (Note: For the ONE Flyweight Muay Thai World Championship.) |
| Flyweight Submission Grappling | Mikey Musumeci (c) | def. | Osamah Almarwai | Submission (rear-naked choke) | 1 | 8:03 | (Note: For the ONE Flyweight Submission Grappling World Championship.) |
| Women's Atomweight | Stamp Fairtex | def. | Alyse Anderson | KO (body kick) | 2 | 2:27 |
| Welterweight | Zebaztian Kadestam | def. | Roberto Soldić | TKO (punches) | 2 | 0:45 |
| Lightweight | Sage Northcutt | def. | Ahmed Mujtaba | Submission (heel hook) | 1 | 0:39 |
| Middleweight | Aung La Nsang | def. | Fan Rong | Submission (guillotine choke) | 2 | 0:48 |
| Middleweight Submission Grappling | Tye Ruotolo | def. | Reinier de Ridder | Decision (unanimous) | 1 | 10:00 |
| Catchweight (131 lbs) Muay Thai | Jackie Buntan | def. | Diandra Martin | TKO (punch) | 1 | 2:34 |
Preliminary card (YouTube / Watch ONE)
| Flyweight | Kairat Akhmetov | def. | Reece McLaren | Decision (unanimous) | 3 | 5:00 |
| Lightweight | Ok Rae-yoon | def. | Lowen Tynanes | Decision (unanimous) | 3 | 5:00 |

== Bonus awards ==
The following fighters were awarded bonuses.

- Performance of the Night ($100,000): Rodtang Jitmuangnon
- Performance of the Night ($50,000): Mikey Musumeci, Stamp Fairtex, Zebaztian Kadestam and Sage Northcutt

== See also ==
- 2023 in ONE Championship
- List of ONE Championship events
- List of current ONE fighters
