= 2025 in Absolute Championship Akhmat =

Mixed martial arts events

Information
- First date: February 8, 2025
- Last date: December 5, 2025

Events
- Total events: 15

Fights
- Total fights: 220
- Title fights: 9

The year 2025 was the 13th year in the history of the Absolute Championship Akhmat, a mixed martial arts promotion based in Russia.

== List of events ==
#	Event	Date	Arena	Location
1	ACA 183: Tumenov vs. Vagaev	February 8, 2025	Basket Hall	Krasnodar, Russia
2	ACA 184: Vitruk vs. Silva	February 28, 2025	Irina Viner-Usmanova Gymnastics Palace	Moscow, Russia
3	ACA 185: Koshkin vs. Maher	April 11, 2025	Falcon Club Arena	Minsk, Belarus
4	ACA 186: Kornilov vs. Bogatyrev 2	May 10, 2025	Sibur Arena	Saint Petersburg, Russia
5	ACA 187: Matmuratov vs. Polpudnikov 2	June 6, 2025	Basket Hall	Moscow, Russia
6	ACA 188: Gadzhiev vs. Pshukov	June 28, 2025	Bolshoy Ice Dome	Sochi, Russia
7	ACA 189: Abdulvakhabov vs. Bagov 4	July 11, 2025	Sport Hall Colosseum	Grozny, Russia
8	ACA 190: Gasanov vs. Aryshev	August 15, 2025	Irina Viner-Usmanova Gymnastics Palace	Moscow, Russia
9	ACA 191: Tumenov vs. Cruz	September 5, 2025	Basket Hall	Krasnodar, Russia
10	ACA 192: Bakhytzhanuly vs. Erokhin	September 14, 2025	Almaty Arena	Almaty, Kazakhstan
11	ACA 193: Kerimov vs. Selimkhanov	October 4, 2025	Sport Hall Colosseum	Grozny, Russia
12	ACA 194: Johnson vs. Aliakbari	October 23, 2025	The Agenda Arena	Dubai, United Arab Emirates
13	ACA 195: Kornilov vs. Vakhaev	November 7, 2025	KSK Arena	Saint Petersburg, Russia
14	ACA 196: Silva vs. Borisov	November 23, 2025	Falcon Club Arena	Minsk, Belarus
15	ACA 197: Ibragimov vs. Magomedov	December 5, 2025	CSKA Arena	Moscow, Russia

== ACA 183: Tumenov vs. Vagaev ==
ACA 183: Tumenov vs. Vagaev
- Promotion: Absolute Championship Akhmat
- Date: February 8, 2025
- Venue: Basket Hall
- City: Krasnodar, Russia

ACA 183: Tumenov vs. Vagaev was a mixed martial arts event held by Absolute Championship Akhmat on February 8, 2025, at the Basket Hall in Krasnodar, Russia.

=== Background ===
In the final of the 2023 ACA Welterweight Grand Prix with for the ACA Welterweight Championship bout between current two-time champion Albert Tumenov and former champion Abubakar Vagaev headlined the event.

In the final of the 2023 ACA Middleweight Grand Prix with for the ACA Middleweight Championship bout between current champion Magomedrasul Gasanov and Shamil Abdulaev served as the co-main event.

=== Results ===
Main card
Weight class				Method	Round	Time	Notes
Welterweight	Abubakar Vagaev	def.	Albert Tumenov (c)	Decision (unanimous) (49–46, 48–47, 50–45)	5	5:00	(Note: 2023 ACA Welterweight Grand Prix Final. For the ACA Welterweight Championship.)
Middleweight	Magomedrasul Gasanov (c)	def.	Shamil Abdulaev	Decision (unanimous) (50–45, 50–45, 49–46)	5	5:00	(Note: 2023 ACA Middleweight Grand Prix Final. For the ACA Middleweight Championship.)
Welterweight	Yusuf Raisov	def.	Artem Reznikov	TKO (punches)	1	2:33
Welterweight	Viskhan Magomadov	def.	Nikolay Aleksakhin	Decision (unanimous) (29–28, 29–28, 29–28)	3	5:00
Lightweight	Rasul Magomedov	def.	Mehdi Dakaev	Decision (split) (28–29, 29–28, 29–28)	3	5:00
Preliminary card
Lightweight	Daud Shaikhaev	vs.	Ramazan Kishev	Draw (unanimous) (28–28, 28–28, 28–28)	3	5:00
Middleweight	Ramazan Emeev	def.	Abdul-Rakhman Dzhanaev	Decision (unanimous) (29–28, 29–28, 29–28)	3	5:00
Featherweight	Apti Bimarzaev	def.	Carlos Augusto da Silva	Decision (unanimous) (29–28, 29–28, 29–28)	3	5:00
Lightweight	Basir Saraliev	def.	Zamir Aripshev	Submission (guillotine choke)	1	0:52
Bantamweight	Rasul Albaskhanov	def.	Alan Gomes de Castro	Technical Submission (rear-naked choke)	1	0:55
Welterweight	Evgeny Galochkin	def.	Amazasp Martirosyan	Decision (unanimous) (29–28, 29–28, 29–28)	3	5:00
Featherweight	Khasan Dadalov	def.	John Macapá	Decision (unanimous) (30–27, 30–27, 30–27)	3	5:00
Bantamweight	Tamerlan Kulaev	def.	Rodrigo Praia	Decision (unanimous) (30–27, 30–27, 30–27)	3	5:00

== ACA 184: Vitruk vs. Silva ==
ACA 184: Vitruk vs. Silva
- Promotion: Absolute Championship Akhmat
- Date: February 28, 2025
- Venue: Irina Viner-Usmanova Gymnastics Palace
- City: Moscow, Russia

ACA 184: Vitruk vs. Silva was a mixed martial arts event held by Absolute Championship Akhmat on February 28, 2025, at the Irina Viner-Usmanova Gymnastics Palace in Moscow, Russia.

=== Background ===
The event was originally scheduled on February 22, but has been postponed to February 28 for unknown reasons.

In the final of the 2023 ACA Flyweight Grand Prix with for the ACA Flyweight Championship bout between current champion Kurban Gadzhiev and Azamat Pshukov was scheduled for this event. However, Gadzhiev withdrew from the bout due to an injury and the pairing would be postponed to a future date.

A ACA Featherweight Championship rematch between current champion Islam Omarov and former champion Alikhan Suleymanov was scheduled for this event. However, Omarov withdrew from the bout due to injury. Suleymanov was matched with Marcos Rodrigues instead.

A ACA Bantamweight Championship bout between current champion Pavel Vitruk and Mehdi Baydulaev was scheduled at the event. However, Baydulaev pulled out from the bout due to weight issues and was replaced by Josiel Silva on short notice.

=== Results ===
Main card
Weight class				Method	Round	Time	Notes
Bantamweight	Josiel Silva	def.	Pavel Vitruk (c)	Decision (unanimous) (50–45, 50–45, 50–45)	5	5:00	(Note: For the ACA Bantamweight Championship.)
Heavyweight	Kirill Kornilov	def.	Mukhamad Vakhaev	KO (punch)	3	0:59
Light Heavyweight	Muslim Magomedov	def.	Evgeny Erokhin	Decision (unanimous) (30–27, 30–27, 30–26)	3	5:00
Featherweight	Saifulla Dzhabrailov	def.	Gleb Khabibulin	TKO (punches)	1	2:07
Welterweight	Iskandar Mamadaliev	def.	Vitaly Slipenko	KO (punches)	1	2:40
Preliminary card
Featherweight	Alikhan Suleymanov	def.	Marcos Rodrigues	Submission (arm-triangle choke)	1	2:10
Featherweight	Makharbek Karginov	def.	Abdul-Rakhman Dudaev	Decision (unanimous) (29–28, 29–28, 29–28)	3	5:00
Featherweight	Yusup-Khadzhi Zubariev	def.	Kafiz Sakibekov	Decision (unanimous) (29–28, 29–28, 30–27)	3	5:00
Light Heavyweight	Sulim Batalov	def.	Caio Bittencourt	TKO (punches)	1	1:03
Featherweight	Alimardan Abdykaarov	def.	Felipe Froes	Decision (unanimous) (30–27, 30–26, 30–26)	3	5:00
Lightweight	Alexander Matmuratov	def.	Amirkhan Adaev	Decision (unanimous) (30–27, 30–27, 30–27)	3	5:00
Bantamweight	Imran Bukuev	def.	Kholmurod Nurmatov	Decision (unanimous) (29–28, 30–27, 30–27)	3	5:00
Featherweight	Bekhruz Zukhurov	def.	Shergazy Kenjebekov	Decision (unanimous) (30–27, 30–27, 29–28)	3	5:00
Lightweight	Abdul-Rakhman Temirov	def.	Igor Olchonov	Submission (arm-triangle choke)	3	2:22

== ACA 185: Koshkin vs. Maher ==
ACA 185: Koshkin vs. Maher
- Promotion: Absolute Championship Akhmat
- Date: April 11, 2025
- Venue: Falcon Club Arena
- City: Minsk, Belarus.

ACA 185: Koshkin vs. Maher was a mixed martial arts event held by Absolute Championship Akhmat on April 11, 2025, at the Falcon Club Arena in Minsk, Belarus.

=== Background ===
A welterweight bout between Andrey Koshkin and Denis Maher headlined the event.

=== Results ===
Main card
Weight class				Method	Round	Time	Notes
Welterweight	Andrey Koshkin	def.	Denis Maher	Decision (split) (48–47, 47–48, 48–47)	5	5:00
Welterweight	Artem Damkovsky	def.	Alexey Makhno	TKO (punches)	1	2:08
Featherweight	Pavel Gordeev	def.	Viktor Makarenko	Decision (unanimous) (29–28, 29–28, 29–28)	3	5:00
Featherweight	Rustam Kerimov	def.	Luis Rafael Laurentino	KO (punches)	2	1:59
Preliminary card
Welterweight	Elias Silvério	def.	Viktor Azatyan	Submission (rear-naked choke)	3	2:37
Catchweight (209 lb)	Arbi Aguev	def.	Sergey Chmel	Decision (unanimous) (30–27, 30–27, 30–27)	3	5:00
Catchweight (165 lb)	Vladislav Mishkevich	def.	Artem Buloychik	TKO (punches)	1	2:52
Light Heavyweight	Sergey Starodub	def.	Artem Dushenko	Technical Submission (north-south choke)	1	4:36
Heavyweight	Arash Sadeghi	def.	Ruslan Medzhidov	TKO (punches)	2	2:45
Bantamweight	Chermen Gobaev	def.	Vladislav Novitsky	Decision (unanimous) (30–27, 30–27, 30–27)	3	5:00
Bantamweight	Hayk Kazaryan	def.	Igor Zhirkov	TKO (punches)	3	4:09
Flyweight	Mhitar Barseghyan	def.	Emomakhdi Orzuzoda	Decision (unanimous) (29–28, 29–28, 29–28)	3	5:00

== ACA 186: Kornilov vs. Bogatyrev 2 ==
ACA 186: Kornilov vs. Bogatyrev 2
- Promotion: Absolute Championship Akhmat
- Date: May 10, 2025
- Venue: Sibur Arena
- City: Saint Petersburg, Russia

ACA 186: Kornilov vs. Bogatyrev 2 was a mixed martial arts event held by Absolute Championship Akhmat on May 10, 2025, at the Sibur Arena in Saint Petersburg, Russia.

=== Background ===
A heavyweight rematch between Kirill Kornilov and Adam Bogatyrev headlined the event. The pairing previously met at ACA 172 in March 2024, which Bogatyrev won by fourth round submission.

=== Bonus awards ===
The following fighters received $20,000 bonus.

- Performance of the Night: Alexey Shurkevich, Aleksandr Maslov, Ruslan Shamilov and Rene Pessoa

=== Results ===
Main card
Weight class				Method	Round	Time	Notes
Heavyweight	Kirill Kornilov	def.	Adam Bogatyrev	Decision (unanimous) (50–45, 50–45, 49–46)	5	5:00
Featherweight	Alexey Shurkevich	def.	Anatoliy Boyko	KO (punches)	3	0:34
Lightweight	Hacran Dias	def.	Marat Balaev	Decision (unanimous) (30–27, 30–27, 30–27)	3	5:00
Heavyweight	Aleksandr Maslov	def.	Yuriy Fedorov	KO (punch)	2	0:58
Light Heavyweight	Maxim Grishin	def.	Evgeny Egemberdiev	TKO (arm injury)	2	0:47	(Note: Egemberdiev missed weight (209.2 lb).)
Preliminary card
Middleweight	Ruslan Shamilov	def.	Gadzhimurad Khiramagomedov	Technical Submission (anaconda choke)	3	3:58
Light Heavyweight	Vitaly Bigdash	def.	Artur Astakhov	TKO (doctor stoppage)	2	5:00
Middleweight	Vladimir Vasilyev	def.	Stanislav Vlasenko	TKO (punches)	2	2:03
Middleweight	Rene Pessoa	def.	Mikhail Dolgov	KO (punch)	1	1:59
Featherweight	David Dzhibilov	def.	Akhmed Musakaev	Decision (unanimous) (29–28, 29–28, 30–27)	3	5:00
Welterweight	Evgeniy Galochkin	def.	Michel Prazeres	Decision (unanimous) (29–28, 29–28, 29–28)	3	5:00
Middleweight	Ivan Bogdanov	def.	Ewerton Polaquini	Decision (unanimous) (29–28, 29–28, 29–28)	3	5:00
Lightweight	Mikhail Odintsov	def.	Herbert Batista	Decision (unanimous) (30–27, 30–27, 30–27)	3	5:00	(Note: Batista missed weight (161.4 lb).)
Flyweight	Umalat Israpilov	def.	Oyatullo Muminov	Decision (unanimous) (29–28, 29–28, 30–27)	3	5:00
Lightweight	Bogdan Plutakhin	def.	Kanybek Zhanybek Uulu	Decision (unanimous) (30–27, 30–27, 29–28)	3	5:00
Lightweight	Akhmed Magomedov	def.	Mikhail Egorov	Decision (unanimous) (30–27, 30–27, 30–27)	3	5:00

== ACA 187: Matmuratov vs. Polpudnikov 2 ==
ACA 187: Matmuratov vs. Polpudnikov 2
- Promotion: Absolute Championship Akhmat
- Date: June 6, 2025
- Venue: Basket Hall
- City: Moscow, Russia

ACA 187: Matmuratov vs. Polpudnikov 2 was a mixed martial arts event held by Absolute Championship Akhmat on June 6, 2025, at the Basket Hall in Moscow, Russia.

=== Background ===
The event was originally would take place in Ufa, Russia, with the main event was scheduled as a lightweight bout between 49-years old veteran Vener Galiev and Lom-Ali Nalgiev. However, the event has been moved to Moscow after Galiev's serious injury. As a results, a lightweight rematch between Alexander Matmuratov and Alexey Polpudnikov served as the new headliner.

=== Results ===
Main card
Weight class				Method	Round	Time	Notes
Lightweight	Alexander Matmuratov	def.	Alexey Polpudnikov	Decision (split) (46–49, 48–47, 48–47)	5	5:00	(Note: Polpudnikov missed weight (158 lb).)
Welterweight	Vinicius Cruz	def.	Nikolay Aleksakhin	Decision (unanimous) (29–28, 29–28, 29–28)	3	5:00
Welterweight	Edil Esengulov	def.	Ivan Soloviev	Submission (rear-naked choke)	1	2:52
Middleweight	Murad Abdulaev	def.	Vladislav Yankovskiy	Decision (unanimous) (30–27, 30–27, 30–27)	3	5:00
Featherweight	Enrique Barzola	def.	Kafiz Sakibekov	Technical Submission (guillotine choke)	3	1:03
Preliminary card
Heavyweight	Zumso Zuraev	def.	Carlos Felipe	Submission (arm-triangle choke)	2	4:17
Light Heavyweight	Caio Bittencourt	def.	Ruslan Gabaraev	TKO (doctor stoppage)	1	0:19	(Note: Bittencourt missed weight (208.6 lb).)
Middleweight	Chris Honeycutt	def.	Shamil Yamilov	Decision (unanimous) (29–27, 29–27, 29–28)	3	5:00
Middleweight	Mubaraksho Mubarakshoev	def.	Azamat Dzhigkaev	Submission (rear-naked choke)	1	3:32
Bantamweight	Renat Ondar	def.	Murad Kalamov	Decision (unanimous) (29–28, 29–28, 29–28)	3	5:00
Lightweight	Lom-Ali Nalgiev	def.	Levan Makashvili	KO (body kick)	1	0:26
Featherweight	Said Khatiev	def.	Roman Ogulchanskiy	Decision (unanimous) (29–28, 30–27, 30–27)	3	5:00
Flyweight	Mansur Khatuev	def.	Romero dos Reis	Submission (guillotine choke)	1	4:01	(Note: Khatuev missed weight (129.4 lb).)
Lightweight	Imam Vitakhanov	def.	Bayzet Khatkhokhu	KO (body kick)	1	1:30
Featherweight	Alexander Treskin	def.	Said-Magomed Gimbatov	TKO (punches)	2	2:34
Flyweight	Vagiz Ismagilov	def.	Muso Vistokadamov	Decision (unanimous) (30–27, 30–27, 30–27)	3	5:00
Bantamweight	Magomed Sardalov	def.	Alexsandro Praia	TKO (doctor stoppage)	1	5:00

== ACA 188: Gadzhiev vs. Pshukov ==
ACA 188: Gadzhiev vs. Pshukov
- Promotion: Absolute Championship Akhmat
- Date: June 28, 2025
- Venue: Bolshoy Ice Dome
- City: Sochi, Russia

ACA 188: Gadzhiev vs. Pshukov was a mixed martial arts event held by Absolute Championship Akhmat on June 28, 2025, at the Bolshoy Ice Dome in Sochi, Russia.

=== Background ===
In the final of the 2023 ACA Flyweight Grand Prix with for the ACA Flyweight Championship bout between current champion Kurban Gadzhiev and Azamat Pshukov headlined this event.

=== Bonus awards ===
The following fighters received $20,000 bonus.

- Performance of the Night: Azamat Pshukov, Uzair Abdurakov, Osimkhon Rakhmonov and Abdul-Rakhman Dzhanaev

=== Results ===
Main card
Weight class				Method	Round	Time	Notes
Flyweight	Azamat Pshukov	def.	Kurban Gadzhiev (c)	Submission (rear-naked choke)	3	2:17	(Note: 2023 ACA Flyweight Grand Prix Final. For the ACA Flyweight Championship.)
Light Heavyweight	Grigor Matevosyan	def.	Asylzhan Bakhytzhanuly	Decision (unanimous) (29–27, 29–27, 29–26)	3	5:00
Lightweight	Daud Shaikhaev	def.	Artem Reznikov	Submission (neck crank)	1	4:17	(Note: Shaikhaev missed weight (159.1 lb).)
Welterweight	Uzair Abdurakov	def.	Ustarmagomed Gadzhidaudov	KO (punches)	2	1:25
Flyweight	Alexander Podlesniy	def.	Pavel Vitruk	Decision (unanimous) (30–27, 30–27, 29–28)	3	5:00
Preliminary card
Welterweight	Zhakshylyk Myrzabekov	def.	Chersi Dudaev	TKO (punches)	3	1:47
Lightweight	Herdeson Batista	def.	Ali Abdulkhalikov	Submission (face crank)	1	2:53
Featherweight	Saifulla Dzhabrailov	def.	Felipe Froes	Decision (unanimous) (29–28, 29–28, 29–28)	3	5:00
Lightweight	Rasul Magomedov	def.	Ramazan Kishev	Decision (unanimous) (29–28, 29–28, 29–28)	3	5:00	(Note: Kishev missed weight (160.1 lb).)
Flyweight	Aren Akopyan	def.	Astemir Nagoev	TKO (knee to the body and punches)	3	5:00	(Note: Nagoev missed weight (127 lb).)
Middleweight	Abdul-Rakhman Dzhanaev	def.	Anderson Gonçalves	TKO (spinning wheel kick)	3	4:54
Bantamweight	Osimkhon Rakhmonov	def.	Goga Shamatava	KO (head kick)	2	4:20	(Note: Batista missed weight (161.4 lb).)
Featherweight	Denis Silva	def.	Islam Meshev	Decision (split) (30–27, 28–29, 30–27)	3	5:00
Featherweight	Rustam Asuev	def.	John Macapá	Decision (unanimous) (29–28, 29–28, 29–28)	3	5:00	(Note: Asuev missed weight (149 lb).)
Lightweight	Ali Suleymanov	def.	Zamir Aripshev	Decision (unanimous) (29–28, 29–28, 29–28)	3	5:00

== ACA 189: Abdulvakhabov vs. Bagov 4 ==
ACA 189: Abdulvakhabov vs. Bagov 4
- Promotion: Absolute Championship Akhmat
- Date: July 11, 2025
- Venue: Sport Hall Colosseum
- City: Grozny, Russia

ACA 189: Abdulvakhabov vs. Bagov 4 was a mixed martial arts event held by Absolute Championship Akhmat on July 11, 2025, at the Sport Hall Colosseum in Grozny, Russia.

=== Background ===
In the final of the 2023 ACA Lightweight Grand Prix with for the ACA Lightweight Championship tetralogy bout between current two-time champion Abdul-Aziz Abdulvakhabov and former champion Ali Bagov headlined the event.

=== Bonus awards ===
The following fighters received bonuses:

- Performance of the Night ($100,000): Abdul-Aziz Abdulvakhabov
- Performance of the Night ($20,000): Daniel Oliveira, Dzhambulat Selimkhanov and Ayndi Umakhanov

=== Results ===
Main card
Weight class				Method	Round	Time	Notes
Lightweight	Abdul-Aziz Abdulvakhabov (c)	def.	Ali Bagov	KO (punch)	2	1:11	(Note: 2023 ACA Lightweight Grand Prix Final. For the ACA Lightweight Championship.)
Heavyweight	Carlos Felipe	def.	Mukhamad Vakhaev	Decision (unanimous) (29–28, 29–28, 29–28)	3	5:00
Middleweight	Salamu Abdurakhmanov	def.	Fabio Aguiar	Decision (unanimous) (30–27, 30–27, 30–27)	3	5:00
Light Heavyweight	Elmar Gasanov	def.	Sulim Batalov	Decision (unanimous) (29–28, 29–28, 29–28)	3	5:00	(Note: Batalov missed weight (209.3 lb).)
Featherweight	Mehdi Baydulaev	def.	Marcos Rodrigues	Decision (unanimous) (30–27, 30–27, 30–27)	3	5:00
Preliminary card
Flyweight	Imran Bukuev	def.	Ryskulbek Ibraimov	Decision (unanimous) (30–27, 30–27, 30–27)	3	5:00	(Note: Ibraimov missed weight (128.3 lb).)
Middleweight	Ibragim Magomedov	def.	Husein Kushagov	Decision (unanimous) (29–28, 29–28, 29–28)	3	5:00
Featherweight	Davlatmand Chuponov	def.	Yusup-Khadzhi Zubariev	DQ (illegal soccer kick)	1	3:57	(Note: Chuponov missed weight (147.3 lb).)
Featherweight	Daniel Oliveira	def.	Nashkho Galaev	KO (punch)	1	1:16
Lightweight	Amir Elzhurkaev	def.	Magnus Kelly Conrado	Decision (unanimous) (30–27, 30–27, 30–26)	3	5:00
Flyweight	Dzhaddal Alibekov	def.	Albert Misikov	Decision (split) (29–28, 28–29, 29–28)	3	5:00
Early preliminary card
Featherweight	Dzhambulat Zelimkhanov	def.	Murad Magomedov	Decision (unanimous) (29–28, 29–28, 29–28)	3	5:00
Flyweight	Saygid Abdulaev	def.	Ramzan Suleymanov	Decision (unanimous) (29–28, 29–28, 29–28)	3	5:00
Lightweight	Ayndi Umakhanov	def.	Raush Manfio	KO (punches)	1	1:54
Bantamweight	Khasan Dadalov	def.	German Barsegyan	TKO (punches)	2	2:01
Welterweight	Michel Silva	def.	Zelimkhan Amirov	TKO (knee to the body)	1	1:33
Welterweight	Lincoln Puig	def.	Khamzat Sakalov	Technical Submission (Von Flue choke)	2	2:27
Flyweight	Kholmurod Nurmatov	def.	Akhmed Khamzaev	KO (punch)	3	1:29
Lightweight	Tamerlan Temirov	def.	Shadid Abdurazakov	Decision (split) (29–28, 28–29, 29–28)	3	5:00
Featherweight	Shamil Basaev	def.	Kamal Mamedov	Decision (split) (30–27, 28–29, 29–28)	3	5:00
Bantamweight	Emomakhdi Orzuzoda	def.	Tamerlan Chagaev	Decision (split) (29–28, 28–29, 29–28)	3	5:00

== ACA 190: Gasanov vs. Aryshev ==
ACA 190: Gasanov vs. Aryshev
- Promotion: Absolute Championship Akhmat
- Date: August 15, 2025
- Venue: Irina Viner-Usmanova Gymnastics Palace
- City: Moscow, Russia

ACA 190: Gasanov vs. Aryshev was a mixed martial arts event held by Absolute Championship Akhmat on August 15, 2025, at the Irina Viner-Usmanova Gymnastics Palace in Moscow, Russia.

=== Background ===
A ACA Middleweight Championship bout between current champion Magomedrasul Gasanov and Dmitry Aryshev headlined the event.

=== Bonus awards ===
The following fighters received $20,000 bonus.

- Performance of the Night: Bibert Tumenov, Vitaliy Slipenko and Erivan Pereira

=== Results ===
Main card
Weight class				Method	Round	Time	Notes
Middleweight	Magomedrasul Gasanov (c)	def.	Dmitry Aryshev	TKO (punches)	2	3:55	(Note: For the ACA Middleweight Championship.)
Light Heavyweight	Faridun Odilov	def.	Leonardo Silva	Decision (unanimous) (30–26, 30–26, 30–26)	3	5:00
Lightweight	Bibert Tumenov	def.	Pavel Gordeev	TKO (punches)	2	0:31
Featherweight	Enrique Barzola	def.	Marat Balaev	Submission (rear-naked choke)	3	1:25
Featherweight	Makharbek Karginov	def.	Alimardan Abdykaarov	Decision (unanimous) (29–28, 29–28, 29–28)	3	5:00	(Note: Karginov missed weight (148 lb).)
Preliminary card
Lightweight	Alexey Polpudnikov	def.	Aleksandr Grozin	Decision (split) (29–28, 28–29, 30–27)	3	5:00	(Note: Polpudnikov missed weight (160.2 lb).)
Heavyweight	Amir Aliakbari	def.	Salimgerey Rasulov	TKO (punches and elbows)	1	4:07	(Note: Rasulov missed weight (273 lb).)
Bantamweight	Oleg Borisov	def.	Tomáš Deák	Decision (split) (29–28, 28–29, 29–28)	3	5:00
Welterweight	Michael Graves	def.	Alexey Makhno	TKO (doctor stoppage)	1	5:00	(Note: Makhno missed weight (173.3 lb).)
Featherweight	Gleb Khabibulin	def.	Carlos Augusto da Silva	Decision (unanimous) (30–27, 30–27, 29–28)	3	5:00
Bantamweight	David Dzhibilov	def.	Timur Valiev	Decision (split) (30–27, 28–29, 29–28)	3	5:00
Welterweight	Vitaly Slipenko	def.	Denis Izmodenov	TKO (punches)	1	0:28
Welterweight	Erivan Pereira	def.	Khalid Satuev	KO (punches)	1	0:13
Lightweight	Vicente Vargas	def.	Said-Magomed Batukaev	Decision (unanimous) (29–28, 29–28, 29–28)	3	5:00	(Note: Batukaev missed weight (158.8 lb).)
Flyweight	Azatbek Kochorov	def.	Sergey Shirkunov	Decision (unanimous) (30–27, 30–27, 30–27)	3	5:00

== ACA 191: Tumenov vs. Cruz ==
ACA 191: Tumenov vs. Cruz
- Promotion: Absolute Championship Akhmat
- Date: September 5, 2025
- Venue: Basket Hall
- City: Krasnodar, Russia

ACA 191: Tumenov vs. Cruz was a mixed martial arts event held by Absolute Championship Akhmat on September 5, 2025, at the Basket Hall in Krasnodar, Russia.

=== Background ===
A welterweight bout between former two-time ACA Welterweight Champion Albert Tumenov and Vinicius Cruz headlined the event.

=== Bonus awards ===
The following fighters received $20,000 bonus.

- Performance of the Night: Albert Tumenov and Vadim Ogar

=== Results ===
Main card
Weight class				Method	Round	Time	Notes
Welterweight	Albert Tumenov	def.	Vinicius Cruz	TKO (punches)	2	3:30
Welterweight	Andrey Koshkin	def.	Elias Silvério	Decision (unanimous) (29–27, 29–27, 29–28)	3	5:00
Middleweight	Ibragim Magomedov	def.	Nikola Dipchikov	Decision (unanimous) (29–28, 29–28, 29–28)	3	5:00
Heavyweight	Klidson Abreu	def.	Adam Bogatyrev	TKO (leg injury)	1	0:19
Lightweight	Abdul-Rakhman Temirov	def.	Aurel Pîrtea	Decision (unanimous) (30–27, 30–27, 30–27)	3	5:00
Preliminary card
Featherweight	Hayk Kazaryan	def.	Charles Henrique	Decision (unanimous) (30–27, 30–27, 30–27)	3	5:00	(Note: Henrique missed weight (140.8 lb).)
Featherweight	Gegam Manavazyan	def.	Islam Meshev	Decision (unanimous) (29–28, 29–28, 29–28)	3	5:00
Welterweight	Herbert Batista	def.	Amazasp Martirosyan	Decision (unanimous) (30–27, 30–27, 30–27)	3	5:00
Lightweight	Vadim Ogar	def.	Alexey Meshkov	KO (punches)	1	0:17
Featherweight	Viskhan Kadirov	def.	Luis Rafael Laurentino	Submission (rear-naked choke)	3	2:43

== ACA 192: Bakhytzhanuly vs. Erokhin ==
ACA 192: Bakhytzhanuly vs. Erokhin
- Promotion: Absolute Championship Akhmat
- Date: September 14, 2025
- Venue: Almaty Arena
- City: Almaty, Kazakhstan

ACA 192: Bakhytzhanuly vs. Erokhin was a mixed martial arts event was held by Absolute Championship Akhmat on September 14, 2025, in Almaty, Kazakhstan.

=== Background ===
The event marked the promotion's fourth visit to Almaty and first since ACA 105 in March 2020.

A light heavyweight bout between Asylzhan Bakhytzhanuly and Evgeny Erokhin headlined the event.

=== Results ===
Main card
Weight class				Method	Round	Time	Notes
Light Heavyweight	Asylzhan Bakhytzhanuly	def.	Evgeny Erokhin	Decision (unanimous) (49–46, 49–46, 49–46)	5	5:00
Welterweight	Artem Reznikov	def.	Raush Manfio	TKO (elbows)	3	3:18
Flyweight	Azam Gaforov	def.	Mhitar Barseghyan	Decision (unanimous) (29–27, 29–27, 29–27)	3	5:00	(Note: Gaforov was deducted one point in round 2 due to an illegal strike.)
Middleweight	Dauren Ermekov	def.	Chris Honeycutt	Decision (split) (29–28, 28–29, 29–28)	3	5:00
Featherweight	Bagdos Olzhabay	def.	Said Khatiev	Decision (unanimous) (29–28, 29–28, 29–28)	3	5:00
Preliminary card
Featherweight	Bekhruz Zukhurov	def.	Murad Magomedov	Decision (unanimous) (29–28, 29–28, 29–28)	3	5:00
Welterweight	Oganes Voskanyan	def.	Serik Razgaliev	Decision (unanimous) (29–28, 29–28, 29–28)	3	5:00
Lightweight	Sidney Outlaw	def.	Lom-Ali Nalgiev	Submission (rear-naked choke)	1	1:08	(Note: Outlaw missed weight (160.2 lb).)
Lightweight	Ali Mashrapov	def.	Adil Boranbayev	Decision (split) (28–29, 29–28, 29–28)	3	5:00
Lightweight	Zaur Gadzhiev	def.	Imam Vitakhanov	Submission (triangle choke)	1	3:30
Bantamweight	Erasyl Shukataev	def.	Khasan Anvarov	Submission (rear-naked choke)	1	1:50
Featherweight	Shergazy Kenjebaev	def.	Marcos Rodrigues	Decision (unanimous) (29–28, 29–28, 29–28)	3	5:00	(Note: Rodrigues missed weight (151.7 lb).)
Bantamweight	Chermen Gobaev	def.	Mukhitdin Kholov	Decision (unanimous) (30–27, 30–27, 30–26)	3	5:00

== ACA 193: Kerimov vs. Selimkhanov ==
ACA 193: Kerimov vs. Selimkhanov
- Promotion: Absolute Championship Akhmat
- Date: October 4, 2025
- Venue: Sport Hall Colosseum
- City: Grozny, Russia

ACA 193: Kerimov vs. Selimkhanov was a mixed martial arts event held by Absolute Championship Akhmat on October 4, 2025, in Grozny, Russia.

=== Background ===
A featherweight bout between former ACA Bantamweight Champion Rustam Kerimov and Dzhambulat Zelimkhanov headlined the event.

=== Bonus awards ===
The following fighters received $20,000 bonus.

- Fight of the Night: Kurban Taigibov vs. Yusup-Khadzhi Zubariev and Magomed Sardalov vs. Mekhroch Mamadshoev
- Performance of the Night: Dzhambulat Zelimkhanov

=== Results ===
Main card
Weight class				Method	Round	Time	Notes
Featherweight	Dzhambulat Selimkhanov	def.	Rustam Kerimov	KO (punch to the body)	5	0:22
Featherweight	Kurban Taigibov	def.	Yusup-Khadzhi Zubariev	Decision (unanimous) (29–28, 29–28, 29–28)	3	5:00
Bantamweight	Rasul Albaskhanov	def.	Goga Shamatava	Decision (unanimous) (29–28, 29–28, 30–27)	3	5:00
Lightweight	Magomed Sulumov	def.	Mikhail Odintsov	Decision (majority) (29–28, 29–28, 29–29)	3	5:00	(Note: Odintsov missed weight (158.2 lb).)
Middleweight	Ruslan Shamilov	def.	Gadzhimurad Khiramagomedov	Submission (anaconda choke)	2	4:28
Preliminary card
Light Heavyweight	Arbi Agujev	def.	Artur Astakhov	Decision (unanimous) (30–27, 30–27, 30–27)	3	5:00
Flyweight	Mansur Khatuev	def.	Ruslan Abiltarov	Submission (rear-naked choke)	1	2:26
Middleweight	Murad Abdulaev	def.	Anderson Gonçalves	Decision (unanimous) (30–28, 29–28, 29–28)	3	5:00	(Note: Abdulaev missed weight (187.2 lb).)
Flyweight	Saygid Abdulaev	def.	Murad Zeinulabidov	Decision (unanimous) (30–27, 30–27, 30–27)	3	5:00
Featherweight	Gadzhimurad Aliev	def.	Ortsa Gudaev	Decision (unanimous) (30–27, 30–27, 30–27)	3	5:00
Welterweight	Movsar Baymaskhanov	def.	Tagir Mikailovich Magomedov	Decision (unanimous) (30–27, 30–27, 29–28)	3	5:00
Lightweight	Alikhan Musaev	def.	Mikhail Egorov	TKO (punches)	1	4:55
Bantamweight	Magomed Sardalov	def.	Mekhroch Mamadshoev	Decision (unanimous) (30–27, 30–27, 30–27)	3	5:00
Lightweight	Valeriy Dashkevich	def.	Islam Isaev	Decision (unanimous) (30–26, 30–27, 30–27)	3	5:00	(Note: Isaev missed weight (159.3 lb).)
Bantamweight	German Barsegyan	def.	Asvad Akhmatov	Decision (split) (29–28, 28–29, 29–28)	3	5:00

== ACA 194: Johnson vs. Aliakbari ==
ACA 194: Johnson vs. Aliakbari
- Promotion: Absolute Championship Akhmat
- Date: October 23, 2025
- Venue: The Agenda Arena
- City: Dubai, United Arab Emirates

ACA 194: Johnson vs. Aliakbari was a mixed martial arts event was held by Absolute Championship Akhmat on October 23, 2025, in Dubai, United Arab Emirates.

=== Background ===
The event marked the promotion's second visit to Dubai and first since before it was rebranded promotion at ACB 81 in March 2018.

A heavyweight bout between former ACA Heavyweight Champion Tony Johnson and Amir Aliakbari headlined the event.

=== Results ===
Main card
Weight class				Method	Round	Time	Notes
Heavyweight	Amir Aliakbari	def.	Tony Johnson	Decision (unanimous) (50–45, 50–45, 49–46)	5	5:00
Catchweight (165 lb)	Ali Bagov	def.	Davi Ramos	TKO (punches)	2	2:39
Bantamweight	Abdul-Rakhman Dudaev	def.	Pavel Vitruk	Decision (split) (29–28, 28–29, 30–27)	3	5:00	(Note: Dudaev missed weight (138.8 lb).)
Lightweight	Ali Abdulkhalikov	def.	Alexander Matmuratov	Decision (split) (29–28, 28–29, 29–28)	3	5:00
Welterweight	Kuat Khamitov	def.	Anatoliy Boyko	Decision (unanimous) (29–28, 29–28, 29–28)	3	5:00	(Note: Khamitov missed weight (172.4 lb).)
Preliminary card
Lightweight	Guram Kutateladze	def.	Victor Hugo	TKO (punches)	1	2:44
Flyweight	Umalat Israpilov	def.	Kholmurod Nurmatov	Decision (unanimous) (29–28, 29–28, 29–28)	3	5:00	(Note: Nurmatov missed weight (131.5 lb).)
Featherweight	Zhora Ayvazyan	def.	Denis Silva	KO (punches)	2	0:29
Featherweight	Shamil Basaev	def.	Wellington Pereira	TKO (punches)	2	4:38
Bantamweight	Saidyokub Kakhramonov	def.	Omar El Bily	Submission (rear-naked choke)	1	4:13	(Note: El Bily missed weight (141.6 lb).)
Featherweight	Shamil Boraev	def.	Yehya Gheitta	Decision (unanimous) (30–27, 30–26, 30–26)	3	5:00
Lightweight	Rizwan Ali	def.	Rana Rudra Pratap Singh	TKO (punches)	1	3:21
Heavyweight	Arash Sadeghi	def.	Klidson Abreu	TKO (elbows and punches)	2	3:32

== ACA 195: Kornilov vs. Vakhaev ==
ACA 195: Kornilov vs. Vakhaev
- Promotion: Absolute Championship Akhmat
- Date: November 7, 2025
- Venue: KSK Arena
- City: Saint Petersburg, Russia

ACA 195: Kornilov vs. Vakhaev was a mixed martial arts event was held by Absolute Championship Akhmat on November 7, 2025, in Saint Petersburg, Russia.

=== Background ===
A ACA Heavyweight Championship bout for the vacant title between Kirill Kornilov and former champion Alikhan Vakhaev headlined the event.

=== Bonus awards ===
The following fighters received $20,000 bonus.

- Fight of the Night: Amir Elzhurkaev ($20,000) vs. Albert Gukov ($10,000)
- Performance of the Night: Alexey Butorin

=== Results ===
Main card
Weight class				Method	Round	Time	Notes
Heavyweight	Alikhan Vakhaev	def.	Kirill Kornilov	Decision (unanimous) (48–47, 48–47, 49–46)	5	5:00	(Note: For the vacant ACA Heavyweight Championship.)
Heavyweight	Zumso Zuraev	def.	Anton Vyazigin	TKO (punches)	3	4:40
Lightweight	Vener Galiev	def.	Marat Balaev	TKO (punches)	1	4:27
Light Heavyweight	Alexey Butorin	def.	Maxim Grishin	KO (punches)	1	2:46
Middleweight	Shamil Yamilov	def.	Vladimir Vasilyev	Decision (split) (29–28, 28–29, 29–28)	3	5:00
Preliminary card
Heavyweight	Anton Vinnikov	def.	Ruslan Medzhidov	TKO (punches)	2	2:49
Welterweight	Alexey Kunchenko	def.	Oleg Dadonov	Decision (unanimous) (29–28, 29–28, 29–28)	3	5:00
Lightweight	Amir Elzhurkaev	def.	Albert Gukov	Decision (unanimous) (29–28, 29–28, 29–28)	3	5:00
Middleweight	Ivan Bogdanov	def.	Fabio Aguiar	Decision (unanimous) (29–28, 29–28, 30–27)	3	5:00
Welterweight	Evgeniy Galochkin	def.	Lincoln Henrique	Decision (unanimous) (30–27, 30–27, 30–27)	3	5:00
Flyweight	Oyatullo Muminov	def.	Irgit Oveenchi	Submission (rear-naked choke)	3	4:39
Welterweight	Erivan Pereira	def.	Ayndi Umakhanov	Decision (unanimous) (29–28, 29–28, 29–28)	3	5:00
Welterweight	Bogdan Plutakhin	def.	Sanzhar Azhibaev	TKO (leg kick)	1	0:51
Heavyweight	Daniil Matsola	def.	Dmitriy Vezhenko	TKO (punches)	2	1:36
Light Heavyweight	Artem Dushenko	def.	Manas Temirbekov	Decision (unanimous) (29–28, 30–27, 30–27)	3	5:00
Featherweight	Nikolay Galochkin	def.	Payam Heydarian	Submission (brabo choke)	1	2:28

== ACA 196: Silva vs. Borisov ==
ACA 196: Silva vs. Borisov
- Promotion: Absolute Championship Akhmat
- Date: November 23, 2025
- Venue: Falcon Club Arena
- City: Minsk, Belarus

ACA 196: Silva vs. Borisov was a mixed martial arts event was held by Absolute Championship Akhmat on November 23, 2025, in Minsk, Belarus.

=== Background ===
A ACA Bantamweight Championship bout between current champion Josiel Silva and former champion Oleg Borisov headlined the event.

=== Bonus awards ===
The following fighters received $20,000 bonus.

- Fight of the Night: Husein Kushagov ($20,000) vs. Sergey Starodub ($10,000)
- Performance of the Night: Roman Ogulchanskiy and Vitaly Bigdash

=== Results ===
Main card
Weight class				Method	Round	Time	Notes
Bantamweight	Josiel Silva (c)	def.	Oleg Borisov	KO (knee to the body)	2	3:53	(Note: For the ACA Bantamweight Championship.)
Welterweight	Artiom Damkovsky	def.	Michel Silva	Decision (split) (29–28, 28–29, 29–28)	3	5:00
Welterweight	Alexey Shurkevich	def.	Denis Maher	Decision (unanimous) (30–27, 30–27, 30–27)	3	5:00
Lightweight	Amirkhan Adaev	def.	Vladislav Mishkevich	Decision (unanimous) (29–28, 29–28, 29–28)	3	5:00
Bantamweight	Renat Ondar	def.	Kurban Gadzhiev	Decision (unanimous) (30–27, 30–27, 30–27)	3	5:00
Preliminary card
Welterweight	Chersi Dudaev	def.	Alexander Grebnev	Decision (unanimous) (29–28, 29–28, 29–28)	3	5:00
Lightweight	Viktor Makarenko	def.	Magnus Kelly Conrado	Decision (split) (29–28, 28–29, 29–28)	3	5:00
Light Heavyweight	Vitaly Bigdash	def.	Caio Bittencourt	Technical Submission (guillotine choke)	1	3:15
Featherweight	Roman Ogulchanskiy	def.	Apti Bimarzaev	KO (punches)	1	1:04
Middleweight	Vladislav Yankovskiy	def.	Ewerton Polaquini	Decision (split) (30–27, 28–29, 29–28)	3	5:00
Light Heavyweight	Sergey Starodub	def.	Husein Kushagov	Decision (unanimous) (29–28, 29–28, 29–28)	3	5:00
Welterweight	Ivan Soloviev	def.	Viktor Azatyan	Decision (unanimous) (30–26, 30–26, 30–26)	3	5:00
Lightweight	Ali Suleymanov	def.	Hacran Dias	Decision (unanimous) (30–27, 30–27, 30–27)	3	5:00
Bantamweight	Alan Gomes de Castro	def.	Vladislav Novitskiy	Decision (unanimous) (29–28, 29–28, 29–28)	3	5:00
Flyweight	Vagiz Ismagilov	def.	Akhmed Khamzaev	TKO (punches)	1	1:26

== ACA 197: Ibragimov vs. Magomedov ==
ACA 197: Ibragimov vs. Magomedov
- Promotion: Absolute Championship Akhmat
- Date: December 5, 2025
- Venue: CSKA Arena
- City: Moscow, Russia

ACA 197: Ibragimov vs. Magomedov was a mixed martial arts event held by Absolute Championship Akhmat on December 5, 2025, in Moscow, Russia.

=== Background ===
A ACA Light Heavyweight Championship bout between current champion Adlan Ibragimov and former champion Muslim Magomedov headlined the event.

An interim ACA Welterweight Championship bout between Zhakshylyk Myrzabekov and Uzair Abdurakov served as the co-main event.

=== Bonus awards ===
The following fighters received $20,000 bonus.

- Fight of the Night: Dmitriy Aryshev vs. Anderson Gonçalves
- Performance of the Night: Muslim Magomedov, Zhakshylyk Myrzabekov, Dauren Ermekov and Aleksandr Grozin

=== Results ===
Main card
Weight class				Method	Round	Time	Notes
Light Heavyweight	Muslim Magomedov	def.	Adlan Ibragimov (c)	KO (punch)	2	3:08	(Note: For the ACA Light Heavyweight Championship.)
Welterweight	Zhakshylyk Myrzabekov	def.	Uzair Abdurakov	Technical Submission (rear-naked choke)	1	0:33	(Note: For the interim ACA Welterweight Championship.)
Light Heavyweight	Elmar Gasanov	def.	Faridun Odilov	Decision (unanimous) (30–27, 30–27, 29–28)	3	5:00
Middleweight	Dmitriy Aryshev	def.	Anderson Gonçalves	TKO (punches)	2	1:37
Welterweight	Aurel Pîrtea	def.	Alexey Makhno	Submission (guillotine choke)	3	2:33
Preliminary card
Light Heavyweight	Salamu Abdurakhmanov	def.	Leonardo Silva	Submission (kimura)	3	3:50
Middleweight	Dauren Ermekov	def.	Mubaraksho Mubarakshoev	Submission (neck crank)	2	1:32
Featherweight	Makharbek Karginov	def.	Enrique Barzola	TKO (punches)	1	1:18
Flyweight	Aren Akopyan	def.	Imran Bukuev	Decision (unanimous) (30–27, 30–27, 30–27)	3	5:00
Featherweight	Aleksandr Grozin	def.	Felipe Froes	KO (punch)	2	1:51	(Note: Froes missed weight (148.9 lb).)
Lightweight	Sidney Outlaw	def.	Pavel Gordeev	Decision (unanimous) (30–27, 30–27, 30–27)	3	5:00
Welterweight	Vinicius Cruz	def.	Iskandar Mamadaliev	TKO (punches)	2	3:33
Featherweight	Vicente Vargas	def.	Kafiz Sakibekov	DQ (illegal knee)	2	4:10
Bantamweight	Ayk Kazaryan	def.	Vazha Tsiptauri	Decision (unanimous) (29–28, 29–28, 29–28)	3	5:00

== See also ==
- List of current ACA fighters
- 2025 in UFC
- 2025 in ONE Championship
- 2025 in Professional Fighters League
- 2025 in Konfrontacja Sztuk Walki
- 2025 in Legacy Fighting Alliance
- 2025 in Rizin Fighting Federation
- 2025 in LUX Fight League
- 2025 in Oktagon MMA
- 2025 in Brave Combat Federation
- 2025 in Cage Warriors
- 2025 in UAE Warriors
