= Aung La Nsang =

Burmese mixed martial arts fighter

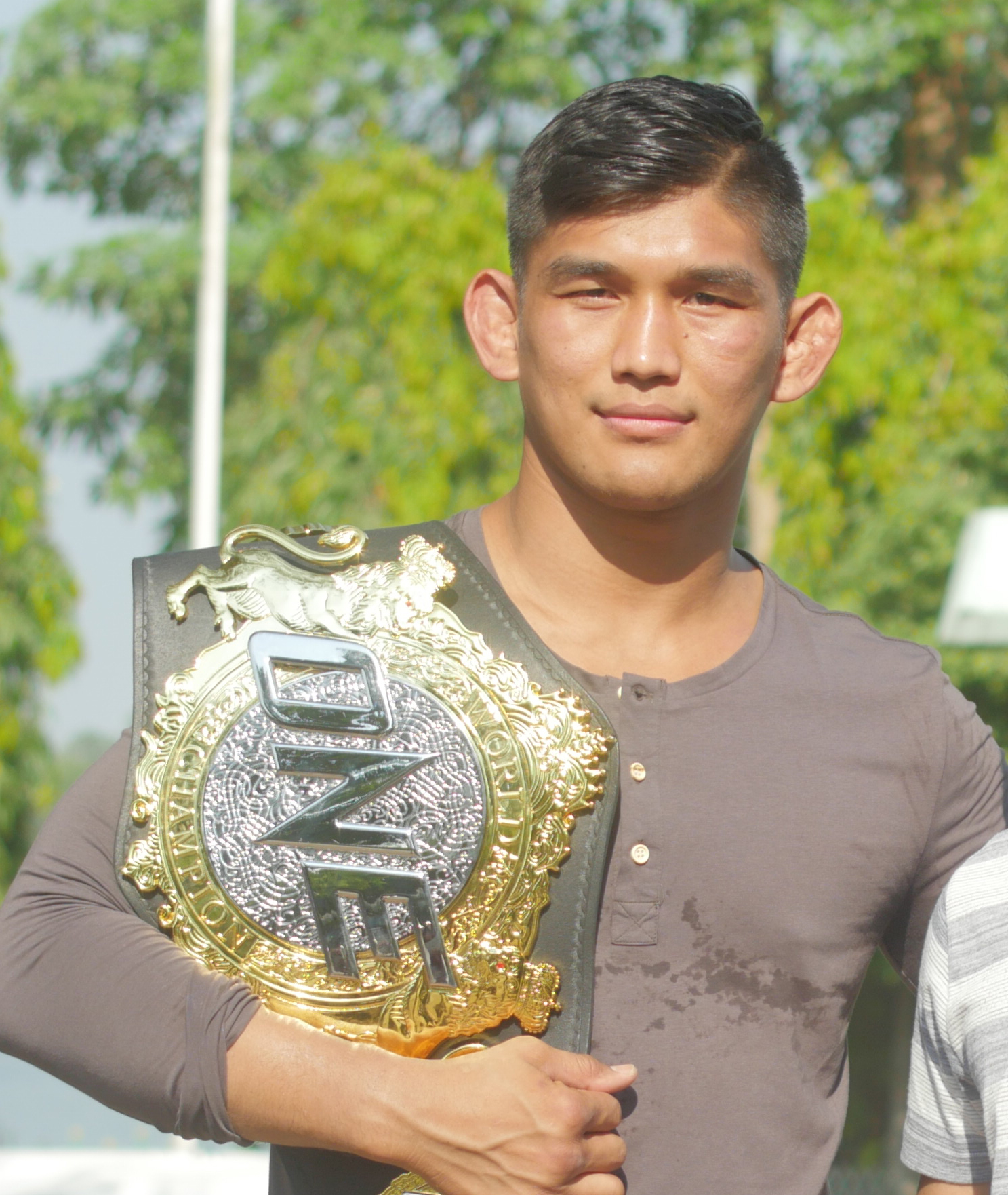
- Born: Aung La Maung Nsang; May 21, 1985 (age 41); Myitkyina, Kachin, Burma (Note: Myanmar was officially known as the Socialist Republic of the Union of Burma at the time of Aung La Nsang's birth.)
- Native name: အောင်လအန်ဆန်း
- Nickname: The Burmese Python
- Nationality: United States; Myanmar (Note: Expatriate)
- Height: 6 ft 1 in (1.85 m)
- Weight: 205 lb (93.0 kg; 14.6 st)
- Division: Welterweight (2013); Middleweight (2011–2017); Light heavyweight (2005–2010, 2018–2025) (Note: ONE Championship refers to their 205 lb weight class as Middleweight, but per the Association of Boxing Commissions in the United States, 205 lb is considered Light heavyweight.); Cruiserweight (2018–2021) (Note: ONE Championship refers to their 225 lb weight class as Light heavyweight, but per the Association of Boxing Commissions in the United States, 225 lb is considered Cruiserweight.)
- Reach: 73 in (185 cm)
- Stance: Orthodox
- Fighting out of: Fort Lauderdale, Florida, U.S.
- Team: Crazy 88 MMA (2007–2018); Kill Cliff FC (2018–2025)
- Trainer: Henri Hooft
- Years active: 2005–2025

Mixed martial arts record
- Total: 47
- Wins: 31
- By knockout: 16
- By submission: 13
- By decision: 2
- Losses: 15
- By knockout: 6
- By submission: 3
- By decision: 6
- No contests: 1

Other information
- Website: aunglansang.com
- Mixed martial arts record from Sherdog

Aung La Maung Nsang (Burmese: အောင်လအန်ဆန်း; born on May 21, 1985) is a Burmese and American former professional mixed martial artist. He competed in both the middleweight and light heavyweight divisions of ONE Championship, where he is a former ONE Middleweight and ONE Light Heavyweight World Champion, and was the second two-division champion in ONE history, having held both belts simultaneously.

He made his MMA debut in 2005 and would go on to become a major star in his native Myanmar after signing with ONE Championship and winning two titles with the organization. Aung La Nsang is a national icon in Myanmar and a bronze statue of him was erected in 2018 at the Kachin National Manau Park in his hometown of Myitkyina. During the opening ceremony of the statue, a huge crowd of thousands fans gathered.

Aung La Nsang is one of the few Myanmar citizens with an international profile, given the country only began opening up to the outside world over the last decade. He was the subject of unprecedented national attention in the lead-up to the fight with Russia's then-middleweight champion Vitaly Bigdash, with billboards across Yangon featuring massive portraits of the two fighters.

== Early life, education and religion ==
Aung La was born in Myitkyina, Kachin State, Myanmar to Christian Kachin parents Nsang Tu Awng, a jewellery trader, and his wife Shadan Nang Bu. He is the third son of five siblings. He attended high school at International School Yangon. In 2003, he moved to the United States to study Agriculture Science at Andrews University in Berrien Springs, Michigan. He graduated in 2007 and worked as a migratory beekeeper while keeping up his MMA training.

Aung La Nsang said he got his nickname of the "Burmese Python" while fighting in the Midwest. A promoter from the Midwest asked where he was from and didn't know where Burma was. Aung La Nsang told him Burma was where the Burmese Python is from and so the promoter started to call him that. The geo-political sensitivities was not aware to the promoter.

Aung La Nsang is a devoted Christian whose faith in God developed during his childhood. On 3 May 2026, he took part in a religious discussion with The Orthodox Muslim Youtube Channel as a layperson. During the discussion, he shared and explained his Christian beliefs and faith.

Aung La Nsang said, "Of course the Kachin people want me to become the Kachin Python or the Kachin Lion, but you can't give yourself a nickname ... It just comes from the fans."

Lethwei

Aung La Nsang has no formal training in his home country's traditional art of Lethwei and only fought with his cousins and friends. He said his uncle used to fight in Lethwei, but his experience was limited. He lists Tway Ma Shaung as one of his favorite Lethwei fighters alongside Lone Chaw. Aung La has often expressed his interest in Lethwei, and stated being open to a mixed-rules MMA-Lethwei fight, which could happen as ONE Championship already held Lethwei fights, notably at ONE Championship: Light of a Nation.

== Mixed martial arts career ==
=== Early career ===
Aung La made his professional debut in 2005, and soon built a reputation for his outstanding submission skills, earning himself the nickname of The Burmese Python. Early in his career, Aung La fought for King of the Cage and Ring of Combat as well as other, smaller promotions. However, his career got off to a slow start, with Aung La losing his first fight. At the age of 27, he became a social media sensation when footage of him knocking out Jason Louck at CFFC 17 went viral in the Kachin State. After the fight, he posed with a Kachin flag.

=== ONE Championship ===
He made his ONE Championship debut in June 2014 and has headlined multiple shows at the Thuwunna Stadium in Yangon since 2016. After signing with ONE in 2014, Aung La Nsang returned to his home country of Myanmar two years later at ONE Championship: Union of Warriors, winning his bout to become a national hero.

On March 18, 2016, he fought in Yangon for the first time, beating Mohamed Ali by submission.

==== 2017: ONE Middleweight Champion ====
On January 14, 2017, Aung La Nsang challenged Vitaly Bigdash for the ONE Middleweight World Championship at ONE Championship: Quest for Power. He lost the fight via unanimous decision.

On June 30, 2017, he became Myanmar's first ever world champion in any mainstream sport, beating Vitaly Bigdash at ONE Championship: Light of a Nation to win the ONE Middleweight World Championship.

On November 3, 2017, Aung La Nsang faced Alain Ngalani at ONE Championship: Hero's Dream in the first openweight bout in ONE Championship history, winning by submission.

Later that year he met with State Counsellor of Myanmar Aung San Suu Kyi to discuss the issues in the Kachin State.

==== 2018: Title defenses and ONE Light Heavyweight Champion ====
On February 23, 2018, he stopped Alexandre Machado at ONE Championship: Quest for Gold in Yangon to win the ONE Light Heavyweight World Championship. This made him only the second fighter in ONE history to become a simultaneous two-division champion, after Martin Nguyen who achieved it the previous year.

On June 29, 2018, Aung La Nsang defended the ONE Middleweight title for the first time against Ken Hasegawa at ONE Championship: Spirit of a Warrior in Yangon in what is now considered one of the greatest title fights in ONE Championship history. He defeated Hasegawa by TKO in the fifth round to retain the title.

On October 26, 2018, he beat Mohammad Karaki by TKO via punches at ONE Championship: Pursuit of Greatness in Yangon to retain the ONE Middleweight title.

==== 2019: Title defenses ====
On March 31, 2019, he defended his title against Ken Hasegawa for a second time at ONE Championship: A New Era in Tokyo, retaining his ONE Middleweight title via technical knockout.

After his title defense against Hasegawa, Aung La signed a new ten-fight contract with ONE Championship.

Aung La made his first defense of the ONE Light Heavyweight World Championship against Brandon Vera at ONE Championship: Century on October 13, 2019. During the match, Aung La connected on a spinning back elbow that sent Vera stumbling and followed it through with punches. Aung La defeated Vera by technical knockout in the second round and successfully defended the ONE Light Heavyweight title.

==== 2020: Losing the Middleweight Championship ====
Aung La Nsang was next expected to defend his ONE Middleweight World Championship against Reinier de Ridder, event and date to be determined. However, de Ridder was later pulled from the bout. Aung La will now face former middleweight champion Vitaly Bigdash for a third time at ONE Infinity 1 on April 10, 2020. However, their title fight was canceled due to the impact of the COVID-19 pandemic on sports.

On September 9, 2020, it was revealed that Aung La would be defending his ONE Middleweight World Championship against Reinier de Ridder once again at ONE Championship: Inside the Matrix on October 30, 2020. On October 30, 2020, Aung La lost to de Ridder by submission in the first round, ending his reign as ONE Middleweight World Champion.

==== 2021: Losing the Light Heavyweight Championship ====
Aung La was expected to defend the ONE Light Heavyweight Championship against Vitaly Bigdash in a trilogy bout at ONE on TNT 4 on April 28, 2021. After Vitaly Bigdash tested positive for COVID-19, Reinier de Ridder took his place. He lost the fight and the belt by unanimous decision.

Aung La faced former ONE Middleweight title contender Leandro Ataides at ONE Championship: Battleground on July 30, 2021. He won the bout via knockout in the first round.

==== 2022: Post-championship run ====
Aung La faced fellow ONE World Champion and former ONE Middleweight MMA Champion Vitaly Bigdash in a trilogy fight at ONE: Full Circle on February 25, 2022. He lost by unanimous decision.

Aung La was scheduled to face Yushin Okami at ONE on Prime Video 4 on November 19, 2022. However, the bout was postponed to ONE 163 for undisclosed reasons. He won the fight via technical knockout in the first round and during the post-fight interview he paid tribute to his teammate, Anthony "Rumble" Johnson, who had died that week.

Aung La was scheduled to face Fan Rong on February 14, 2023, at ONE on Prime Video 6. However, Rong withdrawn from the bout after having tested positive for COVID-19 and was replaced by Gilberto Galvão at a catchweight of 215 pounds. He won the fight via technical knockout in the first round. This win earned him the Performance of the Night award.

The match between Aung La and Rong was rescheduled for May 5, 2023, at ONE Fight Night 10. Aung La won the fight via a guillotine choke submission in the second round.

Aung La faced Shamil Erdogan on September 6, 2024, at ONE 168. At the weigh-ins, the bout was moved to 213.75 lb after the pairing missed weight and hydration in the designated time window. He lost the fight via technical knockout in the second round.

Aung La and Erdogan rematched on February 20, 2025, at ONE 171. The bout was contested at 210 pounds after Aung La missed weight. Aung La lost the fight via technical knockout in the first round.

Aung La returned for his retirement bout at ONE Fight Night 36, taking on former ONE Welterweight MMA champion, Zebaztian Kadestam. He won the fight via TKO in the second round. Post-fight, he was awarded a $50,000 Performance of the Night bonus, and was officially announced to be the third entrant into the ONE Championship Hall of Fame.

== Honored by Tatmadaw ==
In July 2018, Commander-in-Chief Snr-Gen Min Aung Hlaing issued an official statement of congratulations, claiming the ethnic Kachin fighter embodies the indomitable spirit of Myanmar, the pride of the nation. Aung La was invited to the Ministry of Defence and presented with a cash award as a token of appreciation and recognition by representatives of all three branches of the Myanmar armed forces.

On February 24, 2018, Commander-in-Chief Snr-Gen Min Aung Hlaing and Tatmadaw (army, navy, air force) officials honored to Aung La Nsang. On behalf of the Tatmadaw Commander-in-Chief, Yangon Command Commander Maj-Gen Thet Pone presented Aung La Nsang with a Myanmar Ks 10 million cash prize, as well as a certificate of honor sent by the Tatmadaw Commander-in-Chief, at an event held at the Rose Garden Hotel in Yangon.

== Charity work ==
Since becoming a superstar in his native land via his ONE Championship success, Aung La has committed himself to several charity projects, using his reach and fame to try and help the people of Myanmar. In particular, he has given his backing to educational charities such as "Street School Initiative" and Global Citizen, as well as other causes in his native Kachin state.

Aung La is a passionate advocate for Myanmar's wildlife and he has been a big supporter of Voices for Momos, a campaign against illegal wildlife trade, since its launch in November 2017.

On 9 November 2018, Aung La was appointed as ambassador of Fighting Wildlife Crime by World Wide Fund for Nature, Myanmar.

== Championships and accomplishments ==
- ONE Championship
  - ONE Middleweight Championship (One time)
    - Three successful title defenses
  - ONE Light Heavyweight Championship (One time)
    - One successful title defense
  - Performance of the Night (Two times) vs. Gilberto Galvão, vs. Zebaztian Kadestam
  - ONE Hall of Fame (Third Inductee)
- World MMA Awards
  - 2018 International Fighter of the Year

== Mixed martial arts record ==
Professional record breakdown
47 matches	31 wins	15 losses
By knockout	16	6
By submission	13	3
By decision	2	6
No contests	1	

Res.	Record	Opponent	Method	Event	Date	Round	Time	Location	Notes
Win	31–15 (1)	Zebaztian Kadestam	TKO (punches)	ONE Fight Night 36	October 3, 2025	2	2:20	Bangkok, Thailand	Performance of the Night.
Loss	30–15 (1)	Shamil Erdogan	KO (head kick)	ONE 171	February 20, 2025	1	0:28	Lusail, Qatar	Catchweight (210 lb) bout; Aung La missed weight.
Loss	30–14 (1)	Shamil Erdogan	TKO (punches)	ONE 168	September 6, 2024	2	2:48	Denver, Colorado, United States	Catchweight (213.75 lb) bout; both fighters missed weight.
Win	30–13 (1)	Fan Rong	Submission (guillotine choke)	ONE Fight Night 10	May 5, 2023	2	0:48	Broomfield, Colorado, United States	
Win	29–13 (1)	Gilberto Galvão	TKO (punches)	ONE Fight Night 6	January 14, 2023	1	1:29	Bangkok, Thailand	Catchweight (215 lb) bout. Performance of the Night.
Win	28–13 (1)	Yushin Okami	TKO (punches)	ONE 163	November 19, 2022	1	1:42	Kallang, Singapore	
Loss	27–13 (1)	Vitaly Bigdash	Decision (unanimous)	ONE: Full Circle	February 25, 2022	3	5:00	Kallang, Singapore	Catchweight (209 lb) bout; Bigdash missed weight.
Win	27–12 (1)	Leandro Ataides	KO (punches)	ONE: Battleground	July 30, 2021	1	3:45	Kallang, Singapore	Catchweight (215 lb) bout.
Loss	26–12 (1)	Reinier de Ridder	Decision (unanimous)	ONE on TNT 4	April 28, 2021	5	5:00	Kallang, Singapore	Lost the ONE Light Heavyweight Championship (225 lb)
Loss	26–11 (1)	Reinier de Ridder	Submission (rear-naked choke)	ONE: Inside the Matrix	October 30, 2020	1	3:26	Kallang, Singapore	Lost the ONE Middleweight Championship (205 lb).
Win	26–10 (1)	Brandon Vera	TKO (punches)	ONE: Century – Part 2	October 13, 2019	2	3:23	Tokyo, Japan	Defended the ONE Light Heavyweight Championship (225 lb).
Win	25–10 (1)	Ken Hasegawa	TKO (punches)	ONE: A New Era	March 31, 2019	2	4:41	Tokyo, Japan	Defended the ONE Middleweight Championship (205 lb).
Win	24–10 (1)	Mohammad Karaki	TKO (punches)	ONE: Pursuit of Greatness	October 26, 2018	1	2:21	Yangon, Myanmar	Defended the ONE Middleweight Championship (205 lb) Broke the record for the most consecutive ONE Middleweight Championship (205 lb) title defenses (2).
Win	23–10 (1)	Ken Hasegawa	KO (punch)	ONE: Spirit of a Warrior	June 29, 2018	5	3:13	Yangon, Myanmar	Defended the ONE Middleweight Championship (205 lb).
Win	22–10 (1)	Alexandre Machado	TKO (head kick and punches)	ONE: Quest for Gold	February 23, 2018	1	0:56	Yangon, Myanmar	Won the ONE Light Heavyweight Championship (225 lb).
Win	21–10 (1)	Alain Ngalani	Submission (guillotine choke)	ONE: Hero's Dream	November 3, 2017	1	4:31	Yangon, Myanmar	Openweight bout.
Win	20–10 (1)	Vitaly Bigdash	Decision (unanimous)	ONE: Light of a Nation	June 30, 2017	5	5:00	Yangon, Myanmar	Won the ONE Middleweight Championship.
Loss	19–10 (1)	Vitaly Bigdash	Decision (unanimous)	ONE: Quest for Power	January 14, 2017	5	5:00	Jakarta, Indonesia	For the ONE Middleweight Championship.
Win	19–9 (1)	Michal Pasternak	Decision (unanimous)	ONE: State of Warriors	October 7, 2016	3	5:00	Yangon, Myanmar	
Win	18–9 (1)	Aleksei Butorin	Submission (arm-triangle choke)	ONE: Dynasty of Champions (Anhui)	July 2, 2016	2	1:57	Hefei, China	
Win	17–9 (1)	Mohamed Ali	Submission (guillotine choke)	ONE: Union of Warriors	March 18, 2016	1	2:38	Yangon, Myanmar	
Win	16–9 (1)	Mahmoud Salama	KO (punches)	ONE FC: Era of Champions	June 14, 2014	1	1:07	Jakarta, Indonesia	
Loss	15–9 (1)	Jonavin Webb	TKO (knee)	Cage Fury FC 28	August 26, 2013	1	2:41	Atlantic City, New Jersey, United States	Welterweight bout.
Win	15–8 (1)	Shedrick Goodridge	Submission (guillotine choke)	Cage Fury FC 26	August 17, 2013	2	1:44	Atlantic City, New Jersey, United States	
NC	14–8 (1)	Kyle Baker	No Contest	Cage Fury FC 23	April 13, 2013	1	0:24	King of Prussia, Pennsylvania, United States	Welterweight bout.
Win	14–8	Jason Louck	KO (punch)	Cage Fury FC 17	October 13, 2012	1	2:30	Dover, Delaware, United States	
Win	13–8	Jesus Martinez	TKO (punches)	Bellator 68	May 11, 2012	1	0:36	Atlantic City, New Jersey, United States	Catchweight (175 lb) bout.
Loss	12–8	Sam Oropeza	Submission (guillotine choke)	Matrix Fights 5	March 26, 2012	2	0:56	Philadelphia, Pennsylvania, United States	
Loss	12–7	Drew Puzon	Decision (unanimous)	Ring of Combat 38	November 18, 2011	3	4:00	Atlantic City, New Jersey, United States	
Win	12–6	Casey Manrique	TKO (punches)	Ring of Combat 37	September 9, 2011	2	1:03	Atlantic City, New Jersey, United States	
Loss	11–6	Uriah Hall	KO (punch)	Ring of Combat 35	August 8, 2011	3	1:37	Atlantic City, New Jersey, United States	
Win	11–5	Mitch Whitesel	Submission (guillotine choke)	Ring of Combat 34	February 24, 2011	1	3:09	Atlantic City, New Jersey, United States	Middleweight debut.
Loss	10–5	Costas Philippou	TKO (punches)	Ring of Combat 33	December 3, 2010	1	0:11	Atlantic City, New Jersey, United States	Catchweight (188 lb) bout.
Win	10–4	Chris Price	Submission (guillotine choke)	C3: Furious	May 9, 2009	1	1:37	Hammond, Indiana, United States	
Win	9–4	Steve Evan Dau	Submission (armbar)	C3: Domination	November 22, 2008	2	1:47	Hammond, Indiana, United States	
Win	8–4	Josh Mix	Submission (armbar)	Michiana Fight League	August 8, 2008	1	1:03	Plymouth, Indiana, United States	
Loss	7–4	James Lee	Submission (heel hook)	KOTC: Explosion	June 15, 2007	1	3:51	Mount Pleasant, Michigan, United States	
Win	7–3	Shawn McCully	Submission (armbar)	CFC 1	March 31, 2007	1	0:59	United States	
Loss	6–3	Julio Paulino	Decision (unanimous)	CFC 1	March 31, 2007	3	5:00	United States	
Win	6–2	Erik Brettin	KO	Heartland: Ground n Pound	February 23, 2007	1	0:18	South Bend, Indiana, United States	
Loss	5–2	Jim Martens	Decision (unanimous)	KOTC: Mass Destruction	January 26, 2007	2	5:00	Mount Pleasant, Michigan, United States	
Win	5–1	Brandon Griffin	Submission (armbar)	KOTC: Meltdown	October 7, 2006	1	0:52	Indianapolis, Indiana, United States	
Win	4–1	Jason Law	Submission	United Fight League 2	August 25, 2006	1		Indianapolis, Indiana, United States	
Win	3–1	Steve Lapear	KO (punches)	Heartland: Ground n Pound	June 7, 2006	1	0:40	South Bend, Indiana, United States	
Win	2–1	Noel Gomez	Submission (armbar)	Ultimate Throwdown	May 13, 2006	1	2:25	Mishawaka, Indiana, United States	
Win	1–1	Halton Flowers	KO	Champions Factory	March 11, 2006	1	0:00	South Bend, Indiana, United States	
Loss	0–1	Emerson Rushing	TKO (doctor stoppage)	Total Fight Challenge 3	March 25, 2005	1	2:24	Hammond, Indiana, United States	Light Heavyweight debut.

== See also ==
- List of male mixed martial artists
- List of current ONE fighters
- List of ONE Championship champions
- Double champions in MMA

== Notes ==
Awards and achievements
Preceded by Vitaly Bigdash	3rd ONE Middleweight Champion; June 30, 2017 – October 30, 2020	Succeeded by Reinier de Ridder
Preceded by Roger Gracie	2nd ONE Light Heavyweight Champion; February 23, 2018 – April 28, 2021	Succeeded by Reinier de Ridder
