= Double champions in MMA =

Achievement of MMA fighters

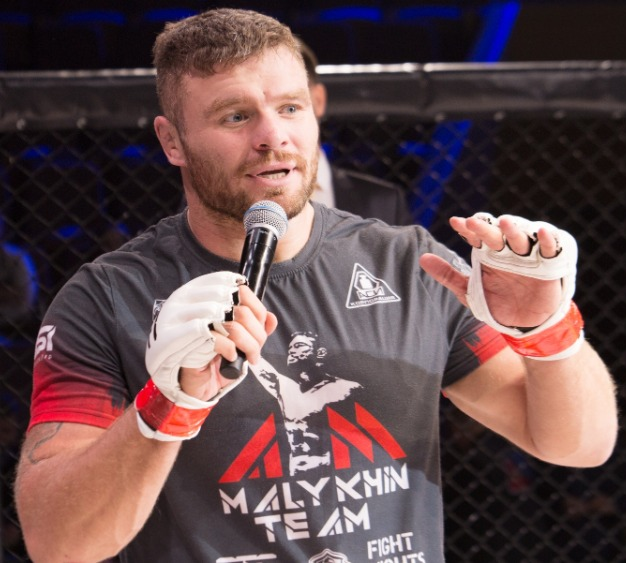
Anatoly Malykhin was the first fighter to become a three division champion in MMA history.

Double belt, double champion (or simultaneous champion in cases where the belts are won without abandoning or losing the other) is an achievement made by mixed martial artists in several categories.

== Controversies ==
Some sports experts argue that a double championship could be detrimental to the divisions that the champion competes in. The progression of the divisions may be blocked, which can be considered unfair to other challengers. This can be due to the fact that MMA athletes cannot compete in short periods of time (except for rare circumstances, such as fights that end quickly and/or without injury) and must have adequate time for recovery and training camp. Furthermore, athletes need time to adjust their weight, which can further delay title fights.

== Historical double-champions of the main associations ==
Nº	Name	Division	Title	Defenses	Organization	Simultaneous
1	Randy Couture	Heavyweight	1997	0	UFC	No
1	Randy Couture	Heavyweight	2000	2	UFC	No
1	Randy Couture	Heavyweight	2007	1	UFC	No
1	Randy Couture	Light heavyweight	2003	0	UFC	No
1	Randy Couture	Light heavyweight	2003	0	UFC	No
1	Randy Couture	Light heavyweight	2004	0	UFC	No
2	Antônio Silva	Heavyweight	2005	0	Cage Rage/ Cage Warriors	Yes
2	Antônio Silva	Super heavyweight	2005	1	Cage Rage/ Cage Warriors	Yes
3	Dan Henderson	Welterweight	2007	0	PRIDE	Yes
3	Dan Henderson	Middleweight	2005	0	PRIDE	Yes
4	B.J. Penn	Welterweight	2004	0	UFC	No
4	B.J. Penn	Lightweight	2008	3	UFC	No
5	Gegard Mousasi	Middleweight	2008	0	DREAM	No
5	Gegard Mousasi	Light heavyweight	2010	1	DREAM	No
6	Bibiano Fernandes	Featherweight	2009	1	DREAM	No
6	Bibiano Fernandes	Bantamweight	2011	0	DREAM	No
7	Joe Warren	Featherweight	2010	0	Bellator	No
7	Joe Warren	Bantamweight	2014	0	Bellator	No
7	Joe Warren	Bantamweight	2014	0	Bellator	No
8	David Branch	Light heavyweight	2015	1	WSOF	Yes
8	David Branch	Middleweight	2014	2	WSOF	Yes
9	Mamed Khalidov	Middleweight	2015	1	KSW	No
9	Mamed Khalidov	Light heavyweight	2009	1	KSW	No
10	Conor McGregor	Lightweight	2016	0	UFC	Yes
10	Conor McGregor	Featherweight	2015	0	UFC	Yes
10	Conor McGregor	Featherweight	2015	0	UFC	Yes
11	Georges St-Pierre	Middleweight	2017	0	UFC	No
11	Georges St-Pierre	Welterweight	2006	0	UFC	No
11	Georges St-Pierre	Welterweight	2007	0	UFC	No
11	Georges St-Pierre	Welterweight	2008	9	UFC	No
12	Martin Nguyen	Lightweight	2017	0	ONE	Yes
12	Martin Nguyen	Featherweight	2017	3	ONE	Yes
13	Aung La Nsang	Light heavyweight	2018	1	ONE	Yes
13	Aung La Nsang	Middleweight	2017	3	ONE	Yes
14	Mateusz Gamrot	Featherweight	2018	0	KSW	Yes
14	Mateusz Gamrot	Lightweight	2016	4	KSW	Yes
15	Daniel Cormier	Heavyweight	2018	1	UFC	Yes
15	Daniel Cormier	Light heavyweight	2015	3	UFC	Yes
16	Amanda Nunes	Featherweight	2018	2	UFC	Yes
16	Amanda Nunes	Bantamweight	2016	5	UFC	Yes
17	Ryan Bader	Heavyweight	2019	0	Bellator	Yes
17	Ryan Bader	Light heavyweight	2017	1	Bellator	Yes
18	Henry Cejudo	Bantamweight	2019	1	UFC	Yes
18	Henry Cejudo	Flyweight	2018	1	UFC	Yes
19	Patricio Freire	Lightweight	2019	0	Bellator	Yes
19	Patricio Freire	Featherweight	2014	2	Bellator	Yes
19	Patricio Freire	Featherweight	2017	5	Bellator	Yes
20	Roberto Soldić	Middleweight	2021	0	KSW	Yes
20	Roberto Soldić	Welterweight	2017	0	KSW	Yes
20	Roberto Soldić	Welterweight	2018	2	KSW	Yes
21	Reinier de Ridder	Middleweight	2020	2	ONE	Yes
21	Reinier de Ridder	Light heavyweight	2021	0	ONE	Yes
22	Karlos Vémola	Middleweight	2020	0	Oktagon MMA	No
22	Karlos Vémola	Light heavyweight	2022	2	Oktagon MMA	No
23	Christian Lee	Welterweight	2022	0	ONE	Yes
23	Christian Lee	Lightweight	2019	3	ONE	Yes
23	Christian Lee	Lightweight	2022	1	ONE	Yes
24	Salahdine Parnasse	Lightweight	2023	4	KSW	Yes
24	Salahdine Parnasse	Featherweight	2021	2	KSW	Yes
25	Jon Jones	Heavyweight	2023	1	UFC	No
25	Jon Jones	Light heavyweight	2011	8	UFC	No
25	Jon Jones	Light heavyweight	2016	0	UFC	No
25	Jon Jones	Light heavyweight	2018	3	UFC	No
26	Kyoji Horiguchi	Flyweight	2023	1	RIZIN FF	No
26	Kyoji Horiguchi	Bantamweight	2018	0	RIZIN FF	No
26	Kyoji Horiguchi	Bantamweight	2020	0	RIZIN FF	No
27	Anatoly Malykhin	Light Heavyweight	2022	0	ONE	Yes
27	Anatoly Malykhin	Heavyweight	2023	0	ONE	Yes
27	Anatoly Malykhin	Middleweight	2024	0	ONE	Yes
28	Alex Pereira	Middleweight	2022	0	UFC	No
28	Alex Pereira	Light heavyweight	2023	3	UFC	No
29	Ilia Topuria	Featherweight	2024	1	UFC	No
29	Ilia Topuria	Lightweight	2025	0	UFC	No
30	Will Fleury	Light heavyweight	2024	0	Oktagon MMA	Yes
30	Will Fleury	Heavyweight	2025	1	Oktagon MMA	Yes
31	Islam Makhachev	Lightweight	2022	4	UFC	No
31	Islam Makhachev	Welterweight	2025	1	UFC	No

Max Holloway of UFC, who won the featherweight and BMF titles, is not considered as a double champion, as the BMF title is not an official "weight class title". As well as Charles Oliveira and Justin Gaethje from the same promotion, who won the lightweight and BMF titles, are also not considered as double champions for same reason.

== List of double champions by country and organization ==
Nº	Country	Champions
1º	United States	9
2º	Brazil	4
3º	Poland	3
3º	Russia	3
4º	Canada	2
5º	Ireland	2
5º	Australia	1
5º	Myanmar	1
5º	Netherlands	1
5º	France	1
5º	Japan	1
5º	Georgia	1

Nº	Org.	Champions	Nationalities
1º	UFC	11	(United States) (Republic of Ireland) (Canada) (Brazil) (Georgia (country)) (Russia)
2°	ONE	5	(Australia) (Myanmar) (Netherlands) (United States) (Russia)
3º	KSW	4	(Poland) (Croatia) (France)
4º	Bellator	3	(United States) (Brazil)
5º	PFL	1	(Brazil)
5º	PRIDE	1	(United States)
5º	WSOF	1	(United States)
5º	RIZIN FF	1	(Japan)
