= Reinier de Ridder =

Dutch mixed martial artist (b. 1990)

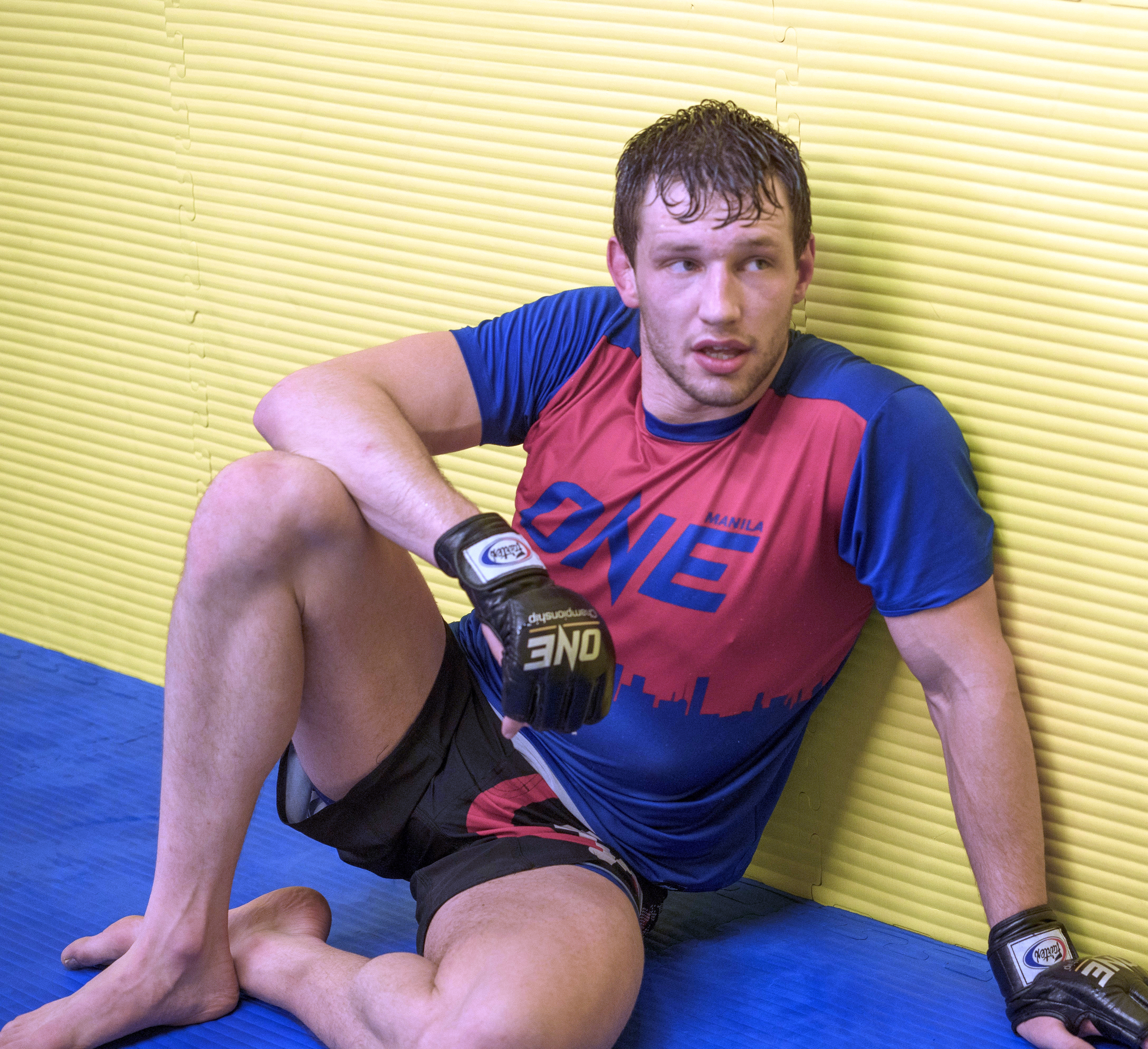
- De Ridder training in 2020
- Born: September 7, 1990 (age 36); Tilburg, Netherlands
- Other names: The Dutch Knight
- Height: 6 ft 4 in (1.93 m)
- Weight: 185 lb (84 kg; 13 st 3 lb)
- Division: Cruiserweight (Note: ONE Championship refers to their 225 lbs class as Light heavyweight, but under the Association of Boxing Commissions in the United States, 225 lbs is considered Cruiserweight.); Light Heavyweight (Note: Reiniet formerly compeyed in ONE Championship, which refers to their 205 lbs class as Middleweight, but under the Association of Boxing Commissions in the United States, 205 lbs is considered Light heavyweight.) (2013, 2019–2024; 2026–present); Middleweight (Note: Reinier formerly competed in ONE Championship, which refers to their 185 lbs class as Welterweight, but under the Association of Boxing Commissions in the United States, 185 lbs is considered Middleweight.) (2017–2018, 2024–2026)
- Reach: 79 in (201 cm)
- Fighting out of: Breda, Netherlands
- Team: Combat Brothers
- Rank: Black belt in Judo; Black belt in Brazilian Jiu-Jitsu
- Years active: 2013–present

Mixed martial arts record
- Total: 26
- Wins: 22
- By knockout: 6
- By submission: 13
- By decision: 3
- Losses: 4
- By knockout: 3
- By decision: 1

Other information
- Mixed martial arts record from Sherdog

Reinier de Ridder (born September 7, 1990), also known by his initials RdR, is a Dutch professional mixed martial artist. He currently competes in the Light Heavyweight division of the Ultimate Fighting Championship (UFC). He previously competed in ONE Championship, where he is a former ONE Middleweight World Champion and ONE Light Heavyweight World Champion. De Ridder was the third two-division champion in ONE history, having previously held the middleweight and light heavyweight belts simultaneously. As of October 3, 2026, he is #8 in the Meta UFC light heavyweight rankings.

== Background ==
Reinier de Ridder started with Judo at the age of six and earned a black belt in his teens. After high school he began training in Brazilian Jiu-Jitsu while attending college and became a black belt. He also owns a physical therapy clinic in Breda, combining his working hours with his training hours.

== Grappling career ==
De Ridder won a silver medal at the European Jiu-Jitsu Championship in 2016.

De Ridder returned to submission grappling competition at ONE X on March 26, 2022, against André Galvão. The match went the distance and as the promotion did not use judges for their submission grappling matches at the time, it was declared a draw.

De Ridder faced Tye Ruotolo in a submission grappling superfight at ONE Fight Night 10 on May 5, 2023. He lost the match by a close decision.

== Mixed martial arts career ==
=== Early career ===
De Ridder had his first amateur fight in 2013, winning by first round submission, before making his professional MMA debut later that year, winning with a first round triangle choke. Reinier went on a seven fight winning streak with all the fights ending with stoppages. After this winning streak, Reinier got the opportunity to fight for his the Middleweight belt in HIT FC, which he won by first round rear-naked choke. After winning his next bout in under two minutes, Reinier got offers from the UFC and ONE FC, deciding to go with the latter due to better terms.

=== ONE Championship ===
De Ridder made his ONE debut at ONE: Hero's Ascent on January 25, 2019, against Fan Rong, in a fight which he won by a first round submission. He would then face Gilberto Galvao at ONE: Legendary Quest, knocking out Galvao in the second round with knees, and former title contender Leandro Ataides at ONE: Warrior's Code, in which he won a hard-fought decision.

==== ONE Middleweight Champion ====
De Ridder faced Aung La Nsang for the ONE Middleweight World Championship at ONE: Inside the Matrix on October 30, 2020. He won the bout by submission in the first round, becoming the champion.

==== Double champion ====
After Vitaly Bigdash tested positive for COVID-19, De Ridder stepped in for a rematch against Aung La Nsang for the ONE Light Heavyweight World Championship at ONE on TNT 4 on April 28, 2021. He won the fight by unanimous decision to become the new ONE Light Heavyweight World Champion, and the third simultaneous two-division champion in ONE history.

In the first middleweight title defense, De Ridder faced Kiamrian Abbasov at ONE: Full Circle on February 25, 2022. After applying an arm-triangle choke at the end of the second round that forced Abbasov to tap after the bell, De Ridder ultimately won with the same submission in the third round. This win earned him the Performance of the Night award.

De Ridder faced former multiple-time ADCC and BJJ world champion André Galvão in a grappling match at ONE: X on March 26, 2022. They grappled to a draw after 12 minutes since neither could find the submission.

De Ridder made his the second title defense against former champion Vitaly Bigdash on July 22, 2022, at ONE 159. After surviving an early guillotine from Bigdash, Reiner choked him out with an inverted triangle choke in the first round. This win earned him the Performance of the Night award.

De Ridder was scheduled to defend the middleweight title against Shamil Abdulaev at ONE on Prime Video 3 on October 22, 2022. However, Abdulaev withdrew due to not being medically cleared and the bout was cancelled.

De Ridder faced Anatoly Malykhin to defend his light heavyweight title on December 3, 2022, at ONE on Prime Video 5. He suffered his first career loss after getting knocked out in the first round.

A rematch between De Ridder and Malykhin for the ONE Middleweight World Championship took place on March 1, 2024, at ONE 166. He lost the title via technical knockout in round three.

=== Post ONE ===
After parting with the promotion, De Ridder faced Magomedmurad Khasaev on July 27, 2024, at UAE Warriors 51. He won the fight via TKO in the first round.

=== Ultimate Fighting Championship ===
On September 24, 2024, it was announced that De Ridder had signed with the Ultimate Fighting Championship.

De Ridder faced Gerald Meerschaert on November 9, 2024, at UFC Fight Night 247. He won the fight via an arm-triangle choke submission in the third round.

De Ridder faced Kevin Holland on January 18, 2025, at UFC 311. He won the fight via a rear naked choke submission in the first round.

De Ridder faced three-time NCAA Division I collegiate wrestling champion Bo Nickal on May 3, 2025, at UFC on ESPN 67. He won via technical knockout in the second round due to a knee to the body, becoming the first fighter to beat Nickal in mixed martial arts. This fight earned him his first UFC Performance of the Night award.

De Ridder faced former UFC Middleweight Champion Robert Whittaker in the main event on July 26, 2025, at UFC on ABC 9. He won the fight by split decision. 9 out of 16 media outlets scored the bout for De Ridder.

De Ridder was scheduled to face Anthony Hernandez in the main event of UFC Fight Night 262 on October 18, 2025. However, Hernandez was forced to withdraw from the bout due to an injury and was replaced by Brendan Allen. De Ridder lost the bout via technical knockout at the end of the fourth round, after he was unable to continue.

De Ridder faced Caio Borralho on March 7, 2026, at UFC 326. He lost the fight by unanimous decision.

Returning to light heavyweight, de Ridder faced Roman Dolidze on August 22, 2026, at UFC Fight Night 285. He won the fight via technical knockout in round one.

== Championships and accomplishments ==
=== Mixed martial arts ===
- Ultimate Fighting Championship
  - Performance of the Night (One time) vs. Bo Nickal
- ONE Championship
  - ONE Middleweight World Championship (One time)
    - Two successful defenses
  - ONE Light Heavyweight World Championship (One time)
  - Performance of the Night (Two times) vs. Kiamrian Abbasov and Vitaly Bigdash
  - Submission of the Night (against Fan Rong at ONE Championship: Hero's Ascent)
  - Fight of the Night (against Leandro Ataides at ONE Championship: Warrior's Code)
  - Third double champion in ONE history
  - 2020: Submission of the Year vs. Aung La Nsang
  - 2022: Submission of the Year vs. Vitaly Bigdash at ONE 159
  - 2024: Ranked #3 Fight of the Year vs. Anatoly Malykhin
- HIT Fighting Championship
  - HIT Middleweight Championship (One time)
- 360 Promotion
  - 360 Middleweight Championship (One time)
- World MMA Awards
  - July 1, 2024 – December 31, 2025 Upset of the Year vs. Bo Nickal at UFC on ESPN: Sandhagen vs. Figueiredo
- MMA Fighting
  - 2025 Second Team MMA All-Star

== Mixed martial arts record ==
Professional record breakdown
26 matches	22 wins	4 losses
By knockout	6	3
By submission	13	0
By decision	3	1

Res.	Record	Opponent	Method	Event	Date	Round	Time	Location	Notes
Win	22–4	Roman Dolidze	TKO (punches)	UFC Fight Night: Hernandez vs. Rodrigues	August 22, 2026	1	4:01	Sacramento, California, United States	Return to Light Heavyweight.
Loss	21–4	Caio Borralho	Decision (unanimous)	UFC 326	March 7, 2026	3	5:00	Las Vegas, Nevada, United States	
Loss	21–3	Brendan Allen	TKO (corner stoppage)	UFC Fight Night: de Ridder vs. Allen	October 18, 2025	4	5:00	Vancouver, British Columbia, Canada	
Win	21–2	Robert Whittaker	Decision (split)	UFC on ABC: Whittaker vs. de Ridder	July 26, 2025	5	5:00	Abu Dhabi, United Arab Emirates	
Win	20–2	Bo Nickal	TKO (knee to the body)	UFC on ESPN: Sandhagen vs. Figueiredo	May 3, 2025	2	1:53	Des Moines, Iowa, United States	Performance of the Night.
Win	19–2	Kevin Holland	Submission (rear-naked choke)	UFC 311	January 18, 2025	1	3:31	Inglewood, California, United States	
Win	18–2	Gerald Meerschaert	Submission (arm-triangle choke)	UFC Fight Night: Magny vs. Prates	November 9, 2024	3	1:44	Las Vegas, Nevada, United States	Return to Middleweight.
Win	17–2	Magomedmurad Khasaev	TKO (punches)	UAE Warriors 51	July 27, 2024	1	2:24	Abu Dhabi, United Arab Emirates	
Loss	16–2	Anatoly Malykhin	TKO (retirement)	ONE 166	March 1, 2024	3	1:16	Lusail, Qatar	Lost the ONE Middleweight Championship (205 lb).
Loss	16–1	Anatoly Malykhin	KO (punches)	ONE on Prime Video 5	December 3, 2022	1	4:35	Pasay, Philippines	Lost the ONE Light Heavyweight Championship (225 lb).
Win	16–0	Vitaly Bigdash	Technical Submission (inverted triangle choke)	ONE 159	July 22, 2022	1	3:29	Kallang, Singapore	Defended the ONE Middleweight Championship (205 lb). Performance of the Night.
Win	15–0	Kiamrian Abbasov	Submission (arm-triangle choke)	ONE: Full Circle	February 25, 2022	3	0:57	Kallang, Singapore	Defended the ONE Middleweight Championship (205 lb). Performance of the Night.
Win	14–0	Aung La Nsang	Decision (unanimous)	ONE on TNT 4	April 28, 2021	5	5:00	Kallang, Singapore	Won the ONE Light Heavyweight Championship (225 lb).
Win	13–0	Aung La Nsang	Submission (rear-naked choke)	ONE: Inside the Matrix	October 30, 2020	1	3:26	Kallang, Singapore	Won the ONE Middleweight Championship (205 lb).
Win	12–0	Leandro Ataides	Decision (unanimous)	ONE: Warrior's Code	February 7, 2020	3	5:00	Jakarta, Indonesia	
Win	11–0	Gilberto Galvão	KO (knees)	ONE: Legendary Quest	June 15, 2019	2	0:57	Shanghai, China	
Win	10–0	Fan Rong	Technical Submission (brabo choke)	ONE: Hero's Ascent	January 25, 2019	1	1:15	Pasay, Philippines	Return to Light Heavyweight.
Win	9–0	Warren Allison	Submission (rear-naked choke)	EFC Worldwide 67	March 10, 2018	1	2:00	Johannesburg, South Africa	
Win	8–0	Shota Gvasalia	Submission (rear-naked choke)	HIT-FC 4	October 21, 2017	1	3:55	Horgen, Switzerland	Won the HIT Middleweight Championship.
Win	7–0	Jaouad Ikan	Submission (armbar)	World Fighting League MMA 1	May 27, 2017	1	N/A	Almere, Netherlands	
Win	6–0	Lamine Talbi	Submission (rear-naked choke)	360 Promotion: Volition	April 8, 2017	3	0:41	Walloon Brabant, Belgium	Won the vacant 360 Middleweight Championship.
Win	5–0	Markus Prödl	TKO (punches)	Superior FC 16	March 11, 2017	2	0:51	Darmstadt, Germany	Middleweight debut.
Win	4–0	Alexander Heinrich	TKO (knees and punches)	Superior FC 15	October 29, 2016	1	4:52	Rüsselsheim am Main, Germany	
Win	3–0	Michaelis Efstratiou	Submission (arm-triangle choke)	Superior FC 14	May 21, 2016	1	1:32	Düren, Germany	
Win	2–0	Rene Hoppe	Submission (armbar)	Rostocker & Benefiz: 2 in 1 Fight Night	October 10, 2015	2	1:54	Rostock, Germany	
Win	1–0	Marco Wuest	Submission (triangle choke)	Gladiator FC 2	June 1, 2013	1	4:09	Lauda-Königshofen, Germany	Light Heavyweight debut.

== Submission grappling record ==
Result	Rec.	Opponent	Method	Event	Division	Date	Location
Loss	0–1–1	Tye Ruotolo	Decision (unanimous)	ONE Fight Night 10	Middleweight	May 5, 2023	Broomfield, Colorado, United States
Draw	0–0–1	André Galvão	Draw (time limit)	ONE: X	Superfight	March 26, 2022	Kallang, Singapore

== See also ==
- List of male mixed martial artists
- List of current UFC fighters
- List of ONE Championship champions
- Double champions in MMA

== Notes ==
Awards and achievements
Preceded by Aung La Nsang	4th ONE Middleweight Champion; October 30, 2020 – March 1, 2024	Succeeded by Anatoly Malykhin
Preceded by Aung La Nsang	3rd ONE Light Heavyweight Champion; April 28, 2021 – December 3, 2022	Succeeded by Anatoly Malykhin
Awards
Preceded by Sean Strickland def. Israel Adesanya	World MMA Upset of the Year; July 1, 2024 – December 31, 2025 vs. Bo Nickal at UFC on ESPN: Sandhagen vs. Figueiredo	Incumbent
