= Fan Rong =

Chinese mixed martial arts fighter

- Born: October 1, 1993 (age 33); Jinzhou, Liaoning, China
- Native name: 樊荣
- Other names: King Kong Warrior
- Height: 6 ft 1 in (1.85 m)
- Weight: 205 lb (93 kg; 14.6 st)
- Division: Light Heavyweight; Middleweight; Welterweight
- Reach: 69 in (175 cm)
- Style: Boxing, Wrestling
- Fighting out of: China
- Team: Longyun MMA Gym
- Years active: 2016–present

Mixed martial arts record
- Total: 24
- Wins: 19
- By knockout: 6
- By submission: 11
- By decision: 2
- Losses: 5
- By knockout: 2
- By submission: 3

Other information
- Mixed martial arts record from Sherdog

Fan Rong (Chinese: 樊荣; born October 1, 1993) is a Chinese mixed martial artist who competes in the Middleweight division. Rong has previously competed for ONE Championship, Glory of Heroes and Wu Lin Feng.

== Background ==
WMMAA Champion Fan Rong's first exposure to the martial arts was in 2009, after he moved to Haerbin to attend university. A friend had invited him to tag along to Longyun MMA, and introduced him to his current coach, Jiang Long Yun.

== Mixed martial arts career ==
=== Early career ===
Although he fell short in his pro debut, Fan bounced back to go on a tear through the Chinese scene, finishing all but one opponent in an 11-bout win streak to earn a spot on the ONE Championship roster.

=== ONE Championship ===
Rong made his ONE debut at ONE Championship: Hero's Ascent on January 25, 2019, against Reinier de Ridder, in a fight which he lost by a first round submission.

Rong faced Sherif Mohamed on June 15, 2019, at ONE Championship: Legendary Quest. He won the bout via technical knockout in the second round.

Rong was announced for ONE Championship: Inside the Matrix 3, where he faced Yuri Simões on November 13, 2020. Rong won the bout by unanimous decision.

Rong faced Vitaly Bigdash at ONE: Winter Warriors II on December 17, 2021. He lost via guillotine choke in the third round.

Rong was scheduled to face Aung La Nsang on January 14, 2023, at ONE on Prime Video 6. However, Fan withdrawn from the bout after having tested positive for COVID-19 and was replaced by Gilberto Galvão at a catchweight of 215 pounds. The pair was rescheduled for May 5, 2023, at ONE Fight Night 10. Rong lost the fight via a guillotine choke submission in the second round.

Rong faced Shamil Erdogan at ONE Friday Fights 22 on June 23, 2023, losing the bout at the start of the second after being unable to continue due to a body kick.

== Mixed martial arts record ==
Professional record breakdown
23 matches	19 wins	4 losses
By knockout	6	1
By submission	11	3
By decision	2	0

Res.	Record	Opponent	Method	Event	Date	Round	Time	Location	Notes
Loss	19–5	Shamil Erdogan	KO (body kick)	ONE Friday Fights 22	June 23, 2023	2	0:37	Bangkok, Thailand	
Loss	19–4	Aung La Nsang	Submission (guillotine choke)	ONE Fight Night 10	May 5, 2023	2	0:48	Broomfield, Colorado, United States	
Loss	19–3	Vitaly Bigdash	Submission (guillotine choke)	ONE: Winter Warriors II	December 17, 2021	3	0:41	Kallang, Singapore	Catchweight (210 lb) bout.
Win	19–2	Yuri Simões	Decision (unanimous)	ONE: Inside the Matrix 3	November 13, 2020	3	5:00	Kallang, Singapore	
Win	18–2	Sherif Mohamed	TKO (punches)	ONE: Legendary Quest	June 15, 2019	2	3:50	Shanghai, China	
Loss	17–2	Reinier de Ridder	Technical Submission (brabo choke)	ONE: Hero's Ascent	January 25, 2019	1	1:15	Pasay, Philippines	Return to Light Heavyweight.
Win	17–1	Solekh Khasanov	Submission (armbar)	Glory of Heroes 32: Huizhou	July 7, 2018	3	N/A	Huizhou, China	Welterweight bout.
Win	16–1	Tony Angelov	TKO (punches)	Glory of Heroes: New Zealand vs China	March 4, 2018	2	N/A	Auckland, New Zealand	
Win	15–1	Felipe Nsue	Submission (rear-naked choke)	Glory of Heroes: Guangzhou	January 13, 2018	3	N/A	Guangzhou, China	
Win	14–1	Gevorg Sargsyan	Submission	Memorial Jorge Martins 13	November 18, 2017	1	N/A	Martigny, Switzerland	
Win	13–1	Falco Neto	Submission (heel hook)	Glory of Heroes: Luoyang	September 23, 2017	1	N/A	Luoyang, China	
Win	12–1	Ilyar Iminov	TKO (punches)	Glory of Heroes: Conquest of Heroes 3	April 28, 2017	2	N/A	Chengde, China	
Win	11–1	Fozil Nuralizoda	Submission (heel hook)	Superstar Fight 7	January 13, 2017	1	N/A	Loudi, China	
Win	10–1	Askar Mozharov	Submission (rear-naked choke)	The Legend King Championship 1	December 17, 2016	1	1:19	Hefei, China	
Win	9–1	Rustam Yamashev	Submission (shoulder choke)	Faith FC 4	October 29, 2016	1	N/A	Shenzhen, China	Return to Middleweight.
Win	8–1	Majid Sedigh Moridani	TKO (punches)	Chinese MMA Super League: Day 2	October 15, 2016	1	N/A	Tianjin, China	
Win	7–1	Kwak Byung-in	Decision (unanimous)	Chinese MMA Super League: Day 1	October 14, 2016	3	5:00	Tianjin, China	Light Heavyweight debut.
Win	6–1	Rufat Asadov	Submission (choke)	WLF E.P.I.C. 8	September 8, 2016	2	N/A	Zhengzhou, China	
Win	5–1	Nikita Osipov	Submission	WLF E.P.I.C. 7	August 20, 2016	2	N/A	Zhengzhou, China	
Win	4–1	Valeriy Izansky	TKO (punches)	WLF E.P.I.C. 5	June 29, 2016	1	N/A	Zhengzhou, China	
Win	3–1	Liang Lingyu	TKO (punches)	Chinese MMA Super League: Season 5 Day 5	June 7, 2016	1	N/A	Jinzhou, China	
Win	2–1	Wang Lei	Submission (guillotine choke)	Chinese MMA Super League: Season 5 Day 3	June 5, 2016	1	N/A	Jinzhou, China	
Win	1–1	Peng Wang	Submission (rear-naked choke)	Chinese MMA Super League: Season 5 Day 1	June 3, 2016	1	1:46	Jinzhou, China	
Loss	0–1	Takashi Yamashita	KO (head kick)	Art of War 16	January 16, 2016	1	1:04	Beijing, China	Middleweight debut.
