= ONE: Full Circle =

Combat sport events in 2022

- The poster for ONE: Full Circle
- Promotion: ONE Championship
- Date: February 25, 2022
- Venue: Singapore Indoor Stadium
- City: Kallang, Singapore

Event chronology
ONE: Bad Blood	ONE: Full Circle	ONE: Lights Out

ONE: Full Circle was a Combat sport event produced by ONE Championship that took place on February 25, 2022, at the Singapore Indoor Stadium in Kallang, Singapore.

== Background ==
A ONE Middleweight World Championship bout between reigning champion Reinier de Ridder and title challenger Kiamrian Abbasov was scheduled as the main event. Two additional title fights were later added as well a ONE Light Heavyweight Kickboxing World Championship bout between the champion Roman Kryklia and challenger Murat Aygun, as well as a ONE Featherweight Muay Thai World Championship between champion Petchmorakot Petchyindee and challenger Jamal Yusupov.

Jamal Yusupov and David Branch, but the two veterans have been forced to withdraw from their respective matchups.

== Results ==
Main Card (YouTube / ONE Super App)
Weight class				Method	Round	Time	Notes
Middleweight	Reinier de Ridder (c)	def.	Kiamrian Abbasov	Submission (arm-triangle choke)	3	0:57	(Note: For the ONE Middleweight World Championship.)
Light Heavyweight Kickboxing	Roman Kryklia (c)	def.	Murat Aygün	KO (body kick and punches)	1	2:32	(Note: For the ONE Light Heavyweight Kickboxing World Championship.)
Catchweight (209.4 lbs)	Vitaly Bigdash	def.	Aung La Nsang	Decision (unanimous)	3	5:00	(Note: Bigdash missed weight (209.4 lbs).)
Featherweight Kickboxing	Tayfun Özcan	def.	Enriko Kehl	Decision (unanimous)	3	3:00
Heavyweight Kickboxing	Guto Inocente	def.	Bruno Susano	TKO (referee stoppage)	2	2:22
Bantamweight	Fabrício Andrade	def.	Jeremy Pacatiw	KO (knee to the body)	1	1:37
Lead Card (YouTube / Facebook / ONE Super App)
Catchweight (192.4 lbs)	Zebaztian Kadestam	def.	Valmir da Silva	KO (punches)	1	1:26	(Note: Kadestam missed weight (192.4 lbs).)
Bantamweight Muay Thai	Vladimir Kuzmin	def.	Chris Shaw	Decision (unanimous)	3	3:00
Catchweight (128 lbs) Muay Thai	Smilla Sundell	def.	Diandra Martin	TKO (punch)	3	1:35
Welterweight	Daniyal Zainalov	def.	Yuri Simões	Decision (split)	3	5:00
Flyweight Kickboxing	Daniel Puertas Gallardo	def.	Jiduo Yibo	Decision (split)	3	3:00
Lightweight	Drex Zamboanga	def.	Rahul Raju	KO (punches)	1	1:05

== Bonus awards ==
The following fighters received $50,000 bonuses.

- Performance of the Night: Reinier de Ridder and Roman Kryklia

== See also ==
- 2022 in ONE Championship
- List of ONE Championship events
- List of current ONE fighters
