= Vitaly Bigdash =

Russian mixed martial arts fighter (born 1984)

Vitaly Bigdash Виталий Бигдаш
- Born: 25 July 1984 (age 42); Rostov-on-Don, Rostov Oblast, Russian SFSR, Soviet Union (now Rostov-on-Don, Rostov Oblast, Russia)
- Nationality: Russian
- Height: 6 ft 1/2 in (1.84 m)
- Weight: 205 lb (93 kg; 14.6 st)
- Division: Light Heavyweight; Middleweight; Welterweight
- Style: Kickboxing, Muay Thai, Kyokushin Karate, Wrestling
- Fighting out of: Rostov, Russia
- Team: Akhmat Fight Team; Tiger Muay Thai
- Years active: 2012–2022, 2024–present

Mixed martial arts record
- Total: 19
- Wins: 14
- By knockout: 5
- By submission: 7
- By decision: 2
- Losses: 5
- By knockout: 2
- By submission: 1
- By decision: 2

Other information
- Mixed martial arts record from Sherdog

Vitaly Bigdash (Russian: Виталий Бигдаш; born July 25, 1984) is a Russian mixed martial artist who competed in the Light heavyweight division of Absolute Championship Akhmat (ACA). Bigdash has also competed for ONE Championship and he has a former ONE Middleweight World Champion.

In April 2017, Bigdash reached his highest ranking of #37 Light Heavyweight in the world by Fight Matrix.

== Mixed martial arts career ==
=== ONE Championship ===
==== ONE Middleweight Champion ====
Bigdash made his promotional debut challenging Igor Svirid for the ONE Middleweight World Championship at ONE Championship: Tigers of Asia on October 9, 2015. After weathering an early storm in the first round, Bigdash came back to knock out Svirid in the second round to become the new ONE Middleweight World Champion.

Bigdash was originally scheduled to defend his title against Marcin Prachnio at ONE Championship: Quest for Power on January 14, 2017. However, Prachnio was forced to withdraw due to injury and was replaced by Aung La Nsang. Bigdash retained the title by unanimous decision.

He rematched with Aung La Nsang at ONE Championship: Light of a Nation on June 30, 2017. Bigdash lost the title by unanimous decision.

==== Post-title reign ====
Bigdash was scheduled to face Leandro Ataides at ONE Championship: Grit and Glory on May 12, 2018. He lost by technical knockout in the third round.

Bigdash was scheduled to face Yuki Niimura at ONE Championship: Destiny of Champions on December 7, 2018. He won via first-round submission.

Bigdash was originally set to challenge Aung La Nsang for the ONE Light Heavyweight World Championship at ONE on TNT 4 on April 28, 2021. However, he was forced to withdraw after testing positive for COVID-19 and was replaced by Reinier de Ridder.

After a three-year absence, Bigdash returned to face Fan Rong at ONE Championship: Winter Warriors 2 on December 17, 2021. He by third-round submission via guillotine choke.

Bigdash was scheduled to challenge Reinier de Ridder for the ONE Middleweight World Championship at ONE 159 on July 22, 2022. He lost by first-round technical submission via inverted triangle choke.

== Championships and accomplishments ==
- ONE Championship
  - ONE Middleweight World Championship (One time, former)
    - One successful defense

== Mixed martial arts record ==
Professional record breakdown
19 matches	14 wins	5 losses
By knockout	5	2
By submission	7	1
By decision	2	2

Res.	Record	Opponent	Method	Event	Date	Round	Time	Location	Notes
Loss	14–5	Asylzhan Bakhytzhanuly	Decision (unanimous)	ACA 205	July 17, 2026	3	5:00	Almaty, Kazakhstan	
Win	14–4	Caio Bittencourt	Technical Submission (guillotine choke)	ACA 196	November 23, 2025	1	3:15	Minsk, Belarus	Performance of the Night.
Win	13–4	Artur Astakhov	TKO (doctor stoppage)	ACA 186	May 10, 2025	2	5:00	Saint Petersburg, Russia	
Loss	12–4	Leonardo Silva	KO (punches)	ACA 177	June 28, 2024	3	0:53	Sochi, Russia	
Loss	12–3	Reinier de Ridder	Technical Submission (inverted triangle choke)	ONE 159	July 22, 2022	1	3:29	Kallang, Singapore	For the ONE Middleweight Championship (205 lb).
Win	12–2	Aung La Nsang	Decision (unanimous)	ONE: Full Circle	February 25, 2022	3	5:00	Kallang, Singapore	Catchweight (209 lb) bout; Bigdash missed weight.
Win	11–2	Fan Rong	Submission (guillotine choke)	ONE: Winter Warriors II	December 17, 2021	3	0:41	Kallang, Singapore	Catchweight (209 lb) bout.
Win	10–2	Yuki Niimura	Submission (reverse triangle armbar)	ONE: Destiny of Champions	December 7, 2018	1	4:24	Kuala Lumpur, Malaysia	
Loss	9–2	Leandro Ataides	TKO (punches)	ONE: Grit and Glory	May 12, 2018	3	2:37	Jakarta, Indonesia	Light Heavyweight debut.
Loss	9–1	Aung La Nsang	Decision (unanimous)	ONE: Light of a Nation	June 30, 2017	5	5:00	Yangon, Myanmar	Lost the ONE Middleweight Championship.
Win	9–0	Aung La Nsang	Decision (unanimous)	ONE: Quest for Power	January 14, 2017	5	5:00	Jakarta, Indonesia	Defended the ONE Middleweight Championship.
Win	8–0	Igor Svirid	TKO (knee and punches)	ONE: Tigers of Asia	October 9, 2015	2	0:36	Kuala Lumpur, Malaysia	Won the ONE Middleweight Championship.
Win	7–0	Magomed Magomedkerimov	Submission (rear-naked choke)	ProFC 57	March 29, 2015	3	4:20	Rostov-on-Don, Russia	
Win	6–0	Charles Andrade	Submission (triangle choke)	ProFC 54	September 7, 2014	3	2:39	Rostov-on-Don, Russia	
Win	5–0	Pavel Pokatilov	TKO (elbows and knees)	ProFC 53	April 6, 2014	3	0:48	Rostov-on-Don, Russia	
Win	4–0	Dmitriy Emets	KO (kick)	Oplot Challenge 87	November 9, 2013	1	0:53	Kharkov, Ukraine	Welterweight bout.
Win	3–0	Ertan Balaban	Submission (heel hook)	Glory 6	April 6, 2013	1	3:36	Istanbul, Turkey	Middleweight debut.
Win	2–0	Yuriy Shtembulyak	TKO (punches)	ProFC 45	December 15, 2012	2	1:39	Grozny, Russia	
Win	1–0	Davrbek Isakov	Submission (armbar)	ProFC 41	August 24, 2012	1	1:41	Rostov-on-Don, Russia	Welterweight debut.

== See also ==
- List of male mixed martial artists
