= ONE Fight Night 6 =

Combat sport events in 2023

ONE Fight Night 6: Superbon vs. Allazov
- The poster for ONE Fight Night 6: Superbon vs. Allazov
- Promotion: ONE Championship
- Date: January 14, 2023
- Venue: Impact Arena
- City: Bangkok, Thailand

Event chronology
ONE 164: Pacio vs. Brooks	ONE Fight Night 6: Superbon vs. Allazov	ONE Friday Fights 1: Nong-O vs. Ramazanov

ONE Fight Night 6: Superbon vs. Allazov was a combat sport event produced by ONE Championship that took place on January 14, 2023, at the Impact Arena in Bangkok, Thailand.

== Background ==
The event marked the promotion's sixteen visit to Bangkok and first since ONE: A New Breed 3 in August 2020.

A special rules super-fight between former ONE Women's Atomweight Muay Thai and Kickboxing Champions Stamp Fairtex (also 2021 ONE Women's Atomweight World Grand Prix Champions) and former two-times Glory Women's Super Bantamweight Champions Anissa Meksen was planned for the event. However, Meksen missed the weight and hydration testing window. As a result, she will not be allowed to compete. In a social media post, she addressed her no-showing, explaining that she was on weight and wasn't ill, but cited "family issues" as the reason she won't be able to compete. Meksen was replaced by Anna Jarronsak to face Stamp in a women's strawweight kickboxing bout.

A ONE Featherweight Kickboxing World Championship bout between current champion Superbon Singha Mawynn and former K-1 Super Welterweight Champion (also 2022 ONE Featherweight Kickboxing World Grand Prix Champion) Chingiz Allazov headlined the event. The pairing was originally booked for the co-main event at ONE on Prime Video 2 and ONE on Prime Video 5, but Allazov was forced to withdraw from the event due to an injury and Superbon was forced to withdraw due to an illness.

A ONE Bantamweight Muay Thai World Championship bout between current champion Nong-O Gaiyanghadao and former ONE Bantamweight Kickboxing Champion Alaverdi Ramazanov was expected to take place at the event. The pairing was previously scheduled at ONE: X, but Ramazanov pull out from the card due to the 2022 Russian invasion of Ukraine, all Russian athletes were removed from the card as a result of the Singaporean government banning them from entering the country and the bout was postponed to this date. In turn on November 25, it was announced the bout was moved to ONE Lumpinee 1 at the inaugural event in Lumpinee Boxing Stadium on January 20, 2023.

A ONE Flyweight Kickboxing World Championship rematch between then champion Ilias Ennahachi and #2 ranked contender Superlek Kiatmuu9 was expected to take place at the event. The pair previously met in February 2021 at ONE: Fists of Fury, where Ennahachi defended the title via controversial unanimous decision. However, Ennahachi pulled out due to his inability to make the flyweight limit of 135 pounds while hydrated and he decided to vacated the title. Therefore, Superlek faced Daniel Puertas who was previously scheduled to meet Rodtang Jitmuangnon came up to for the vacant championship.

A ONE Flyweight Submission Grappling World Championship bout between current champion Mikey Musumeci and promotional newcomer Sayan Khertek was expected to take place at the event. However, Khertek forced to withdraw due to injury and was replaced by Gantumur Bayanduuren.

A flyweight kickboxing bout between current ONE Flyweight Muay Thai champion Rodtang Jitmuangnon and Daniel Puertas was expected to take place at the event. The pairing was previously scheduled to co-main event at ONE: First Strike, but Rodtang withdrew from the bout because he tested positive for COVID-19. In turn, Puertas was scheduled to face Superlek Kiatmuu9 for the vacant title and Rodtang instead faced Jiduo Yibu.

A strawweight bout between Lito Adiwang and promotional newcomer Mansur Malachiev was expected to take place at the event. However, Adiwang pulled out from the event due to recurring knee pain after a fight against Jeremy Miado at ONE: X. As a result, the bout was scrapped.

A middleweight bout between former ONE Middleweight and Light Heavyweight World Champion Aung La Nsang and Fan Rong was expected to take place at the event. However, Fan withdrew from the bout after having tested positive for COVID-19 and was replaced by Gilberto Galvão at a catchweight of 215 pounds.

A bantamweight muay thai bout between Liam Harrison and Pongsiri P.K.Saenchai was expected to take place at the event. They were previously expected to meet at ONE on TNT 2 but Harrison withdrew from the event after the COVID-19 situation in the United Kingdom that prevented from him traveling. In turn, Harrison withdrew from the event due to injuries requiring surgery. As a result, the bout was scrapped.

At the weigh-ins, two fighters missed weight for their respective bouts. Rodtang Jitmuangnon weighed in at 136.5 pounds, 1.5 pounds over the flyweight limit. Ekaterina Vandaryeva weighed in at 125.5 pounds, 0.5 pounds over the strawweight limit. Both bouts proceeded at catchweight with Rodtang and Vandaryeva each fined 20% of their purses, which went to their opponents Jiduo Yibu and Anna Jarronsak respectively. However, Jarronsak stepped in to face Stamp Fairtex in a strawweight kickboxing match and the bout between Jarronsak and Vanderyeva was cancelled.

The event was in progress, after bout between Musumeci and Bayanduuren in a submission grappling title match ended, the organization has released a video tribute to Victoria Lee, who died aged 18 on December 26 and the lights were dimmed on the giant screens of the production set at the Impact Arena. A graphic saying "In memory of Victoria Lee, 2004–2022" was then displayed, as ring announcer Dom Lau called on the crowd to stand for a minute’s silence, to remember Lee.

== Results ==
Main card (Amazon Prime Video)
Weight class				Method	Round	Time	Notes
Featherweight Kickboxing	Chingiz Allazov	def.	Superbon Singha Mawynn (c)	KO (punches)	2	1:03	(Note: For the ONE Featherweight Kickboxing World Championship.)
Flyweight Kickboxing	Superlek Kiatmuu9	def.	Daniel Puertas Gallardo	Decision (unanimous)	5	3:00	(Note: For the vacant ONE Flyweight Kickboxing World Championship.)
Flyweight Submission Grappling	Mikey Musumeci (c)	def.	Gantumur Bayanduuren	Decision (unanimous)	1	10:00	(Note: For the ONE Flyweight Submission Grappling World Championship.)
Catchweight (215 lbs)	Aung La Nsang	def.	Gilberto Galvão	TKO (punches)	1	1:29
Catchweight (136.5 lbs) Kickboxing	Rodtang Jitmuangnon	def.	Jiduo Yibu	Decision (unanimous)	3	3:00	(Note: Rodtang missed weight (136.5 lbs).)
Women's Strawweight Kickboxing	Stamp Fairtex	def.	Anna Jaroonsak	Decision (split)	3	3:00
Featherweight	Garry Tonon	def.	Johnny Nuñez	Submission (kimura)	1	1:53
Catchweight (150 lbs)	Shoko Sato	def.	Kim Jae Woong	Decision (unanimous)	3	5:00

== Bonus awards ==
The following fighters received $50,000 bonuses.

- Performance of the Night: Chingiz Allazov, Aung La Nsang, Stamp Fairtex and Anna Jarronsak

== See also ==
- 2023 in ONE Championship
- List of ONE Championship events
- List of current ONE fighters
