= Universal Reality Combat Championship =

MMA promoter based in Philippines

URCC
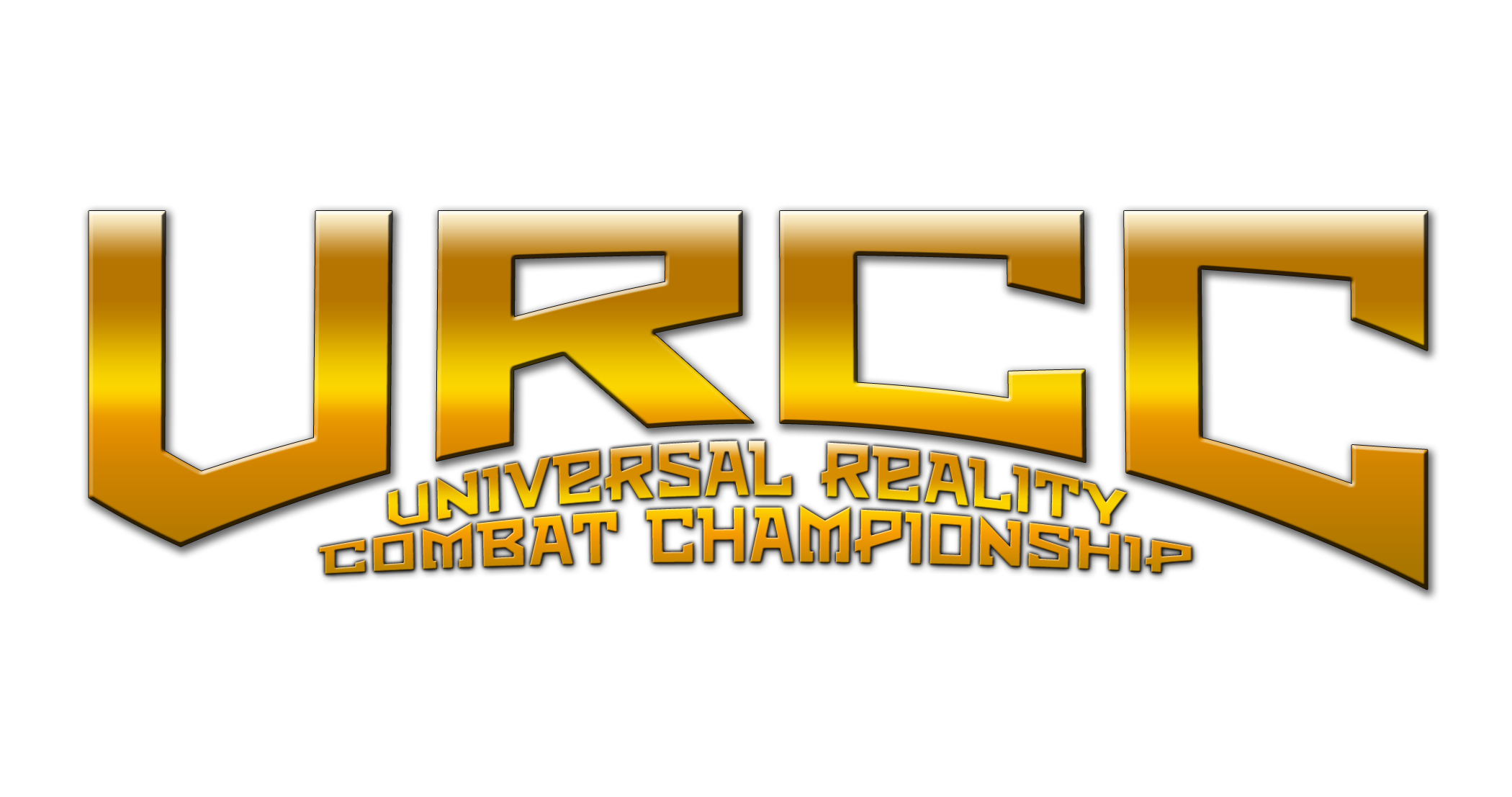
- Type: Private
- Industry: Mixed martial arts promotion
- Founded: 2002; 24 years ago
- Headquarters: Manila, Philippines
- Key people: Alvin Aguilar (founder) Nico Rivera (President of URCC-USA)
- Website: https://urcc.online

Universal Reality Combat Championship (URCC) is the first and only professional mixed martial arts promotion based in the Philippines. Its inaugural event was held at the Casino Filipino Amphitheater in Parañaque, Philippines on November 23, 2002. The URCC is under the supervision of the Games and Amusements Board (GAB), the government agency that sanctions games such as billiards, boxing and basketball. The URCC was founded in 2002 by Filipino BJJ Black belt Alvin Aguilar, Franz von Muhlfeld, Jed Dario and Irwin Tieng. The matches and events of the URCC are aired on ABS-CBN Sports and Action and ABS-CBN Sports and Action HD, URCC's official broadcast partner.

== Notable fights and fighters ==
A number of URCC fighters have gone on to enjoy success fighting for mainstream MMA promotions. Chinese fighter Tiequan Zhang who fought at URCC 15 went on to fight for the WEC and the UFC and is currently ranked as one of the top featherweights in the world. Dave "The Scarecrow" Galera, who won the URCC Interim Bantamweight at URCC 23 is the first homegrown Filipino Fighter to be signed by the UFC.

Kevin Belingon, Eduard Folayang, Eric Kelly and Angelito Manguray all fought for ESPN Star Sports promotion Martial Combat in 2010 while Folayang and Kelly both won fights at ONE Fighting Championship: Champion vs. Champion on September 3, 2011.

Actors Baron Geisler and Kiko Matos, who involved in a feud in May 2016 in a bar, were faced in an exhibition match during the URCC Fight Night card held at the Valkyrie at the Palace last June 25, 2016. This two-round fight, however ended in a unanimous draw. After which, both Geisler and Matos reconciled with each other.

AT URCC 28: Vindication, the first-ever 3-on-3 MMA exhibition match took place. The teams who competed were Team Chan and Team Estroso. All competitors were inside the cage simultaneously with three referees in charge of the action. The fight is momentarily halted after a competitor gets knocked or is unable to continue. Team Estroso won the fight with two of its fighters still standing while Team Chan was left with one.

On January 7, 2017, URCC held its first fight card in the United States of America.

URCC held its second event in the United States in September 2017 in San Mateo, California. Officially called "URCC 32: Fury", the event was hosted at the San Mateo County event center and featured 3 title fights, as well as amateur fights sanctioned under California Amateur Mixed Martial Arts Organization (CAMO).

== Introduction of other Combat Sports ==
They have started to introduce other combat sports and spectacles in their events. URCC 80: Bare Madness headlined a bareknuckle boxing match between Kenjohns Serrano and Map Soberano with undercard fights that included some MMA matches.

A few months after, on January 31, 2023, they held the first ever all-bareknuckle boxing event called URCC 82: Royal Knuckle at Royal Club Makati.

URCC 84: Rage, introduced the slap battle matches as part of the events' spectacle. At URCC 86, included a couple of grappling superfights officiated under the UWW grappling rules.

On October 21, 2023, URCC held their first all-slap battle event that happened at DD Night Club in Quezon City.

== Events ==
#	Event	Date	Venue	Location
99	URCC Fight Night 6	July 18, 2026	Octopus Makati	Makati, Metro Manila, Philippines
98	URCC Fight Club 1	April 16, 2026	G-Side Tomas Morato	Quezon City, Metro Manila, Philippines
97	URCC: Kaogma Collision 2	May 25, 2025	Fuerte CamSur Sports Complex	Pili, Camarines Sur, Philippines
96	URCC Fight Night 5	September 28, 2024	Octopus Makati	Makati, Metro Manila, Philippines
95	URCC Fight Night International 4	July 26, 2024	Octopus Makati	Makati, Metro Manila, Philippines
94	URCC: Kaogma Collision 1	May 25, 2024	Fuerte CamSur Sports Complex	Pili, Camarines Sur, Philippines
93	URCC: Prodigy Progression Series	April 27, 2024	Dynasty Fight Club	Parañaque, Metro Manila, Philippines
92	URCC 90: URCC x Dynasty	March 07, 2024	Dynasty Fight Club	Parañaque, Metro Manila, Philippines
91	URCC 89: Slap Fest	October 21, 2023	DD Night Club	Quezon City, Metro Manila, Philippines
90	URCC 88	September 19, 2023	XYLO at the Palace	Taguig, Metro Manila
89	URCC 87	August 08, 2023	XYLO at the Palace	Taguig, Metro Manila
88	URCC 86	July 04, 2023	XYLO at the Palace	Taguig, Metro Manila
87	URCC 85: Underdog	June 02, 2023	DD Night Club	Quezon City, Metro Manila, Philippines
86	URCC Pangasinan	April 28, 2023	NRSCC Gym	Lingayen, Pangasinan
85	URCC 84: Rage	April 25, 2023	XYLO at the Palace	Taguig, Metro Manila
84	URCC 83: Bloodline	March 04, 2023	Zamboanga Del Norte Convention Center	Dipolog City, Zamboanga del Norte, PH
83	URCC 82: Royal Knuckle	January 31, 2023	Royal Night Club Makati	Makati, Metro Manila, Philippines
82	URCC 81: Decades of Success	December 06, 2022	Okada Manila Grand Ballroom	Parañaque, Metro Manila, Philippines
81	URCC 80: Bare Madness	October 27, 2022	XYLO at the Palace	Taguig, Metro Manila
80	URCC 79: Rise Up for Redemption	August 23, 2022	XYLO at the Palace	Taguig, Metro Manila
79	URCC 78: Unbreakable	March 01, 2022	Rosellyn Compound	Olongapo, Central Luzon, Philippines
78	URCC Global: Retribution	November 28, 2019	Okada Manila Grand Ballroom	Parañaque, Metro Manila, Philippines
77	URCC: Rumble by the Bay	August 10, 2019	Cow Palace Arena	Daly City, California, United States of America
76	URCC Korea 1	June 22, 2019	Songdo Convention Center	Incheon, South Korea
75	URCC 77: Raw Fury	April 27, 2019	Cove Manila	Parañaque, Metro Manila, Philippines
74	URCC BETS 8	December 12, 2018	Coral Ballroom, Casino Filipino Pavilion	Ermita, Manila, Philippines
73	URCC: Colossal	September 29, 2018	Smart Araneta Coliseum	Quezon City, Metro Manila, Philippines
72	URCC 34: Destiny	August 4, 2018	Craneway Pavilion	Richmond, California, United States of America
71	URCC BETS 6: Battle Extreme Tournament of Superstars	June 15, 2018	Coral Ballroom, Casino Filipino Pavilion	Ermita, Manila, Philippines
70	URCC 34 / Destiny MMA - Fight Night 4	February 17, 2018	Neal S. Blaisdell Center	Honolulu, Hawaii, United States of America
69	URCC BETS 4: Battle Extreme Tournament of Superstars	December 13, 2017	Waterfront Airport Hotel and Casino	Lapu-Lapu City, Cebu, Philippines
68	URCC 32 - Fury: Battle of the Islands	September 30, 2017	San Mateo County Event Center	San Mateo County, California, United States of America
67	URCC BETS 3: Battle Extreme Tournament of Superstars	September 15, 2017	Coral Ballroom, Casino Filipino Pavilion	Ermita, Manila, Philippines
66	URCC 30: Hofmann vs. Sothmann	August 12, 2017	Smart Araneta Coliseum	Quezon City, Metro Manila, Philippines
65	URCC BETS 2: Battle Extreme Tournament of Superstars	April 21, 2017	Coral Ballroom, Casino Filipino Pavilion	Ermita, Manila, Philippines
64	URCC BETS: Battle Extreme Tournament of Superstars	January 28, 2017	Coral Ballroom, Casino Filipino Pavilion	Ermita, Manila, Philippines
63	URCC 29: Conquest	January 7, 2017	Kezar Pavilion	San Francisco, California, United States of America
62	URCC 28: Vindication	November 6, 2016	Marriott Grand Ballroom	Pasay, Metro Manila, Philippines
61	URCC Fight Night 3	June 25, 2016	Valkyrie at the Palace	Taguig, Metro Manila, Philippines
60	URCC 27: Rebellion	April 23, 2016	Marriott Grand Ballroom	Pasay, Metro Manila, Philippines
59	URCC 26: Domination	July 25, 2015	Fontana Convention Hall	Clark, Angeles City
59	URCC Fight Night 2	March 28, 2016	El Palacio Hotel	Noveleta, Philippines
58	URCC 25: Takeover	October 23, 2014	Mall of Asia Arena	Pasay, Metro Manila, Philippines
57	URCC: Relaunch	July 31, 2014	Resorts World Hotel	Parañaque, Metro Manila, Philippines
56	URCC: Fight Night 1	January 31, 2014	BAMF MMA Center	Parañaque, Metro Manila, Philippines
55	URCC 24: Uprising	November 30, 2013	SMX Convention Center	Pasay, Metro Manila, Philippines
54	URCC: Bacolod City Brawl 2013	October 18, 2013	L'Fisher Hotel	Bacolod, Negros Occidental, Philippines
53	URCC / Tribal Gear: Dutdutan Tattoo Festival 2013	September 27, 2013	World Trade Center	Pasay, Metro Manila, Philippines
52	URCC 23: Unrivaled	April 27, 2013	SMX Convention Center	Pasay, Metro Manila, Philippines
51	URCC Baguio 5: Unleashed	March 2, 2013	Baguio Convention Center	Baguio, Philippines
50	URCC Cebu 8: Survival	January 19, 2013	J. Centre Convention Hall	Mandaue City, Cebu, Philippines
49	URCC 22: Dekada	December 1, 2012	Mall of Asia Arena	Pasay, Metro Manila, Philippines
48	URCC: Bacolod Brawl 2012	October 19, 2012	L'Fisher Hotel	Bacolod, Negros Occidental, Philippines
47	URCC: Davao Dimaan 4	August 26, 2012	Grand Oases Convention Center	Davao City, Philippines
46	URCC 21: Warpath	April 28, 2012	SMX Convention Center	Pasay, Metro Manila, Philippines
45	URCC Baguio 4: Battleground	February 18, 2012	Baguio Convention Center	Baguio, Philippines
44	URCC Cebu 7: Dominate	January 13, 2012	Cebu International Convention Center	Cebu City, Cebu, Philippines
43	URCC: Rogue Magazine's Black Tie Brawl 2011	November 19, 2011	New World Hotel	Makati, Metro Manila, Philippines
42	URCC 20: XX	November 5, 2011	World Trade Center	Pasay, Metro Manila, Philippines
41	URCC: Bacolod Brawl 2011	October 16, 2011	L'Fisher Hotel	Bacolod, Negros Occidental, Philippines
40	URCC: University Challenge 2011	September 9, 2011	One Esplanade	Pasay, Metro Manila, Philippines
39	URCC: Tribal Gear: Dutdutan Tattoo Festival 2011	August 26, 2011	World Trade Center	Pasay, Metro Manila, Philippines
38	URCC: Davao Digmaan 3	August 21, 2011	Garden Oases Resort & Convention Center	Davao City, Philippines
37	URCC 19: Collision	April 2, 2011	World Trade Center	Pasay, Metro Manila, Philippines
36	URCC Baguio 3: Invasion	February 19, 2011	Baguio Convention Center	Baguio, Philippines
35	URCC Cebu 6: Respect	January 14, 2011	Cebu International Convention Center	Cebu City, Philippines
34	URCC 18: Relenthless	November 13, 2010	A-Venue Events Hall	Makati, Metro Manila, Philippines
33	URCC: Rouge Magazine's Black Brief Brawl 2010	October 29, 2010	New World Hotel Makati	Makati, Metro Manila, Philippines
32	URCC: Bacolod Brawl 2010	October 17, 2010	Hotel PAGCOR	Bacolod, Philippines
31	URCC / Tribal Gear: Dutdutan Tattoo Festival 2010	September 24, 2010	World Trade Center	Pasay, Metro Manila, Philippines
30	URCC: University Challenge 2010	September 18, 2010	A-Venue Events Hall	Makati, Metro Manila, Philippines
29	URCC: Davao Digmaan 2	October 17, 2010	Garden Oases Resort & Convention Center	Davao City, Philippines
28	URCC 17: Havoc	July 24, 2010	A-Venue Events Hall	Makati, Metro Manila, Philippines
27	URCC 16: Reckoning	March 27, 2010	A-Venue Events Hall	Makati, Metro Manila, Philippines
26	URCC Baguio 2: Tribal Wars	February 19, 2010	Baguio Convention Center	Baguio, Philippines
25	URCC Cebu 5: Deliverance	January 15, 2010	Cebu International Convention Center	Cebu City, Philippines
24	URCC 15: Onslaught	November 21, 2009	World Trade Center	Pasay, Metro Manila, Philippines
23	URCC: Rouge Magazine's Black Tie Brawl 2009	October 24, 2009	Ranaissance Hotel Makati	Makati, Metro Manila, Philippines
22	URCC Bacolod Brawl 2009	October 17, 2009	West Negros Gym	Negros Occidental, Philippines
21	URCC Davao Digmaan 2009	August 23, 2009	Davao Convention Center	Davao City, Philippines
20	URCC Cebu 4: Proving Ground	June 20, 2009		Mandaue City, Cebu, Philippines
19	URCC 14: Aggression	July 18, 2009	A.Venue Events Hall	Makati, Metro Manila, Philippines
18	URCC Baguio: Rumble in the Highlands	March 7, 2009	Baguio Convention Center	Baguio, Philippines
17	URCC 13: Indestructible	November 22, 2008	A-Venue Events Hall	Makati, Metro Manila, Philippines
16	URCC Cebu 3: Nemesis	November 15, 2008	Cebu International Convention Centre	Cebu, Philippines
15	URCC Rouge Magazine's Black Tie Brawl 2008	October 18, 2008	Hyatt Hotel Manila	Metro Manila, Philippines
14	URCC 12: Supremacy	July 5, 2008	A. Venue Events Hall	Makati, Metro Manila, Philippines
13	URCC Cebu 2	March 1, 2008	Waterfront City Hotel	Cebu, Philippines
12	URCC 11: No Redemption	November 25, 2007	One Esplanade	Pasay, Metro Manila, Philippines
11	URCC Cebu 1	September 1, 2007	Royal Concourse Hall	Cebu, Philippines
10	URCC 10: Xrated	June 30, 2007	The Fort	Taguig, Metro Manila, Philippines
9	URCC 9: Unstoppable	December 2, 2006	The Arena	San Juan, Metro Manila, Philippines
8	URCC 8: Undisputed	May 20, 2006	The Arena	San Juan, Metro Manila, Philippines
7	URCC 7: The Art of War	December 10, 2005	Araneta Coliseum	Quezon City, Metro Manila, Philippines
6	URCC 6: Unleashed Fury	June 25, 2005	Casino Filipino	Parañaque, Metro Manila, Philippines
5	URCC 5: Beyond Fear	October 23, 2004	Casino Filipino	Parañaque, Metro Manila, Philippines
4	URCC 4: Return to the Dungeon	April 24, 2004	Casino Filipino	Parañaque, Metro Manila, Philippines
3	URCC 3: Siege at the Fort	September 20, 2003	The Fort	Taguig, Metro Manila, Philippines
2	URCC 2: Night of Champions	April 12, 2003	PhilSports Arena	Pasig, Metro Manila, Philippines
1	URCC 1: Mayhem in Manila	November 23, 2002	Casino Filipino	Parañaque, Metro Manila, Philippines

== Rules ==
=== URCC-USA ===
All URCC fights hosted in the United States abide by the rules in place by the athletic commission of each respective state.

=== URCC ===
URCC's rules are different from those of established promotions.

=== Match length ===
URCC matches consist of 3 3-minute rounds for professional and amateur fights. 1 minute break in between rounds.

All title bouts are 5 5-minute rounds.

=== Weight classes ===
Division	Upper weight limit
Atomweight (Women)	48 kg (105.8 lb; 7.6 st)
Strawweight	52 kg (114.6 lb; 8.2 st)
Flyweight	57 kg (125.7 lb; 9.0 st)
Bantamweight	61 kg (134.5 lb; 9.6 st)
Featherweight	66 kg (145.5 lb; 10.4 st)
Lightweight	70 kg (154.3 lb; 11.0 st)
Welterweight	77 kg (169.8 lb; 12.1 st)
Middleweight	84 kg (185.2 lb; 13.2 st)
Light heavyweight	93 kg (205.0 lb; 14.6 st)
Cruiserweight	102 kg (224.9 lb; 16.1 st)
Heavyweight	120 kg (264.6 lb; 18.9 st)

=== Ring ===
The URCC uses a five-roped square ring from 2002 until 2013. On the 2014 event URCC 25: Take Over, the first URCC circular cage was released and planned to use it as official ring to the rest of the URCC history

=== Attire ===
URCC allows fighters latitude in their choice of attire but 4-ounce fingerless gloves and a mouthguard are mandatory. Shoes and derogatory markings on ring attire are forbidden. It is within a fighter's discretion to use other protective equipment such as groin guards.

=== Victory ===
Matches are won via:

- Submission
  - Physical tap out
  - Verbal tap out
- Knockout
  - A fighter falls from a legal blow and is either unconscious or unable to immediately continue.
- Technical Knockout
  - Referee Stoppage (the referee stops the match after seeing that one fighter is completely dominant to the point of endangering his opponent).
  - Doctor Stoppage (the referee stops the match in the event that a fighter is injured via a legal blow and the ring doctor determines that he cannot continue).
  - Forfeited Match (a fighter's corner throws in the towel).
- Decision
  - If the match reaches its time limit then the outcome of the bout is determined by the three judges. The fight is scored by a 10-point must system per round. A three step procedure per round is followed:

1. Determine winner of round (can be draw),
2. Determine if winner dominated round,
3. Fouls then factored in (subtract one point per foul from fighter

  - Draws are acceptable in URCC matches.
- Disqualification
  - A "warning" will be given in the form of a yellow card or a red card (any fighter who executes a foul technique shall be penalized with a talent fee reduction) when a fighter commits an illegal action or does not follow the referee's instruction. Two yellow cards shall lead to a disqualification "red card."
  - The referee's decision will always depend upon the level of violation committed by a fighter whether it is intentional or unintentional. Therefore, the referee may execute the "red card" even without showing the first two "yellow cards" as a caution for a disqualification
  - The referees are also authorized to execute the red "disqualification" card if a fighter has deliberately injured his opponent and can no longer compete.

=== Fouls ===
URCC considers the following to be fouls:

1. Head butting.
2. Eye gouging.
3. Hair pulling.
4. Biting.
5. Fish hooking.
6. Any attacks to the groin
7. Strikes to the back of the head, which includes the occipital region and the spine. The sides of the head and the area around the ears are not considered to be the back of the head. (see Rabbit punch)
8. Small joint manipulation (control of four or more fingers/toes is necessary).
9. Intentionally throwing your opponent out of the ring.
10. Running out of the ring.
11. Purposely holding the ropes. Fighters cannot purposely hang an arm or leg on the ropes and it will result in an immediate warning.
12. Putting a finger into any orifice or into any cut or laceration on an opponent.
13. Striking downward using the point of the elbow.
14. Throat strikes of any kind including without limitation, grabbing the trachea.
15. Clawing, pinching or twisting the flesh.
16. Grabbing the clavicle.
17. Kicking the head of a grounded opponent.
18. Kneeing the head of a grounded opponent.
19. Stomping on a grounded opponent.
20. Kicking to the kidney with a heel.
21. Spiking an opponent to the canvas on his head or neck.
22. Throwing an opponent out of the ring or fenced area.
23. Holding the shorts or gloves of an opponent.
24. Spitting at an opponent.
25. Engaging in an unsportsmanlike conduct that causes an injury to an opponent.
26. Using abusive language in the ring or fenced area.
27. Attacking an opponent on or during the break.
28. Attacking an opponent who is under the care of the referee.
29. Attacking an opponent after the bell has sounded the end of the period of unarmed combat.
30. Flagrantly disregarding the instruction of the referee.
31. Timidity, including without limitation, avoiding contact with an opponent, intentionally or consistently dropping the mouthpiece or faking an injury.
32. Interference by the corner.
33. Throwing in the towel during competition.
34. Exceeding numbers of cornermen.
35. Unauthorized cornerman.
36. Any lock which puts strain on the neck joint.

=== Match conduct ===
- If both fighters are on the verge of falling out of the ring or become entangled in the ropes, the referee will stop the action. The fighters must immediately stop their movements and will then be repositioned in the center of the ring in the same position. Once they are comfortably repositioned, they resume at the referee's instruction.

== Current champions ==
=== Mixed Martial Arts ===
Men

Division	Champion	Team	Record (W-L-D)
Strawweight	(United States) Anthony Do	American Kickboxing Academy	6-3-0
Flyweight	(Philippines) Eros Baluyot	Submission Sport Philippines	4-0-0
Bantamweight	Vacant		
Featherweight	(Philippines) Mark Striegl	Alliance Training Center PH	18-2-0 (1 NC)
Lightweight	(United States) Anthony Taylor	Team BodyShop	7-5-0
Welterweight	(Philippines) John Adajar	Hitman MMA	5-1-0
Welterweight	(United States) Will Chope (Interim)	The Kill Team	42-21-0
Middleweight	(Philippines) Chris Hofmann	Deftac	8-1-0
Light Heavyweight	(Philippines) Chris Hofmann	Deftac	8-1-0
Cruiserweight	(United States) Pete Brooks	Brownhouse MMA	9-0-0
Heavyweight	(Philippines) Sugar Ray Estroso	Ground and Pound MMA	2-5-0

Women

Division	Champion	Team	URCC Record (W-L-D)
Atomweight	(Philippines) Suryin Duad	Pandan Fight Team	3-0-0
Flyweight	(Philippines) Geli Bulaong	Submission Sport	3-1-0

=== Bareknuckle Boxing ===
==== Men ====
Division	Champion	Team	Record (W-L-D)
Welterweight	(Philippines) Allen Wycoco	DyIncredible MMA	2-1-0
