= 2007 in Universal Reality Combat Championship =

Information
- First date: June 30, 2007
- Last date: November 25, 2007

Events
- Total events: 3

Fights
- Total fights: 22

Chronology
2006 in URCC	2007 in Universal Reality Combat Championship	2008 in URCC

The year 2007 is the 6th year in the history of the Universal Reality Combat Championship, a mixed martial arts promotion based in the Philippines. In 2007 the URCC held 3 events beginning with, URCC 10: X.

== Events list ==
#	Event title	Date	Arena	Location
12	URCC 11: Redemption	November 25, 2007	One Esplanade	Pasay, Metro Manila, Philippines
11	URCC Cebu 1	September 1, 2007	Royal Concourse Hall	Cebu, Philippines
10	URCC 10: X	June 30, 2007	The Fort	Taguig, Metro Manila, Philippines

== URCC 10: X ==
URCC 10: X was an event held on June 30, 2007, at The Fort in Taguig, Metro Manila, Philippines.

=== Results ===
Main Card
Weight class				Method	Round	Time	Notes
	Eduard Folayang	def.	Allan Co	TKO (Punches)	1	7:24
	Kevin Belingon	def.	Richard Lasprilla	Decision (Majority)	2	20:00
	Lino Tagacay	def.	Takuro Nishimura	TKO (Punches)	2	0:44
	Carl Sabeniano	def.	Anthony Dominic So	TKO (Punches)	1	2:30
	Vicente Pajaro	def.	Gino Cruz	TKO (Punches)	1	6:00
	Rey Docyogen	def.	Dennis Salazar	TKO (Punches)	1	8:58
	Seyed Razi Jabbari	def.	Benjie Gloria	TKO (Punches)	1	2:17
	Arnel Arancina	def.	Andrew Benibe	TKO (Doctor Stoppage)	1	6:09
	Magellan Perez	def.	Deo Anacio	Submission (Rear-Naked Choke)	1	1:43
	Noble Ampoc	def.	John Naval	Submission (Rear-Naked Choke)	1	5:07

== URCC Cebu 1 ==
URCC Cebu 1 was an event held on September 1, 2007, at Royal Concourse Hall in Cebu, Philippines.

=== Results ===
Main Card
Weight class				Method	Round	Time	Notes
	Cary Bullos	def.	Elijah Siyam	TKO (Punches)	1	0:00

== URCC 11: Redemption ==
URCC 11: Redemption was an event held on November 25, 2007, at One Esplanade in Pasay, Metro Manila, Philippines.

=== Results ===
Main Card
Weight class				Method	Round	Time	Notes
	Caloy Baduria	def.	Frank Camacho	TKO (Punches)	1	2:27
	Fritz Rodriguez	def.	Seyed Razi Jabbari	TKO (Doctor Stoppage)	1	5:30
	Earl Uy	def.	Phil Bryner	TKO (Punches)	1	4:21
	MJ Banaga	def.	Carl Sabeniano	Submission (Rear-Naked Choke)	1	3:01
	Kevin Belingon	def.	Roldan Cartajena	Submission (Armbar)	1	8:42
	Rey Docyogen	def.	Jessie Rafols	TKO (Punches)	1	5:48
	Jesus Rabadon	def.	Noble Ampoc	DQ	1	6:34
	Ryan Paglinawan	def.	Marciano Basas	KO	1	1:57
	Magellan Perez	def.	Tony Donaire	Submission (Armbar)	1	0:49
	Takuro Nishimura	def.	Lando Espinosa	TKO (Punches)	1	6:24
	Cary Bullos	def.	Freddie Magada	KO	1	0:26

== See also ==
- Universal Reality Combat Championship
