= Elite Association of Filipino Mixed Martial Arts Officials =

Elite Association of Filipino Mixed Martial Arts Officials, Inc.
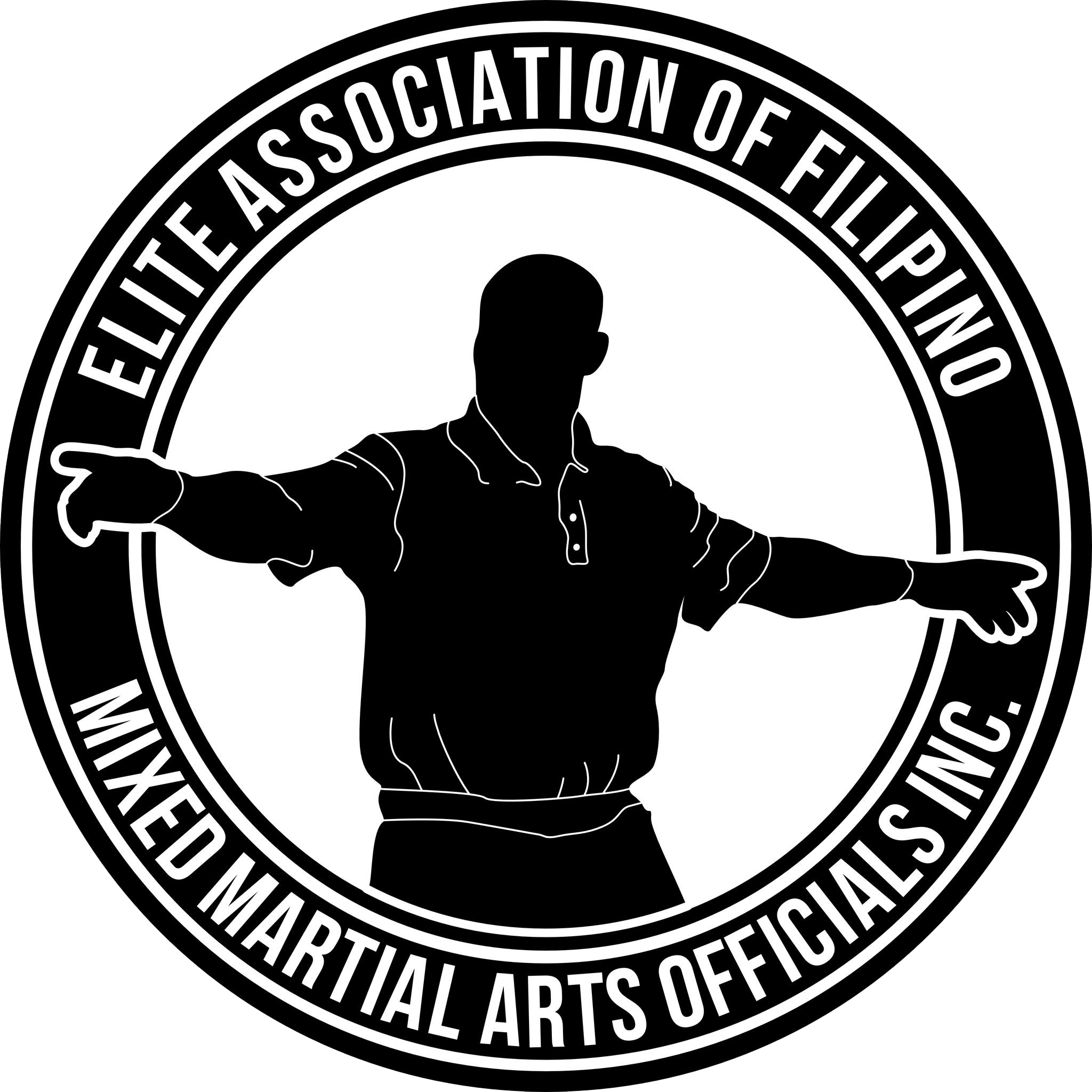
- Logo
- Abbreviation: EAFMMAO
- Founders: Rosenberg Rosete; Joey Lepiten; Franco Rulloda
- Headquarters: Quezon City, Philippines

The Elite Association of Filipino Mixed Martial Arts Officials, Incorporated (EAFMMAO) is a government-recognized association which tackles mixed martial arts officiating in the Philippines.

== History ==
It was spearheaded by three martial artists who have been mixed martial arts officials for over 10 years; Rosenberg Rosete, Joey Lepiten and Franco Rulloda. The founders have officiated local (Philippines) and international events over the years in promotions such as URCC, One Championship, and Martial Combat.

Since its inception, members of the organization have officiated amateur and professional events all over the Philippines for promotions such as URCC, Zeus Fight League, etc.

== Affiliations ==
EAFMMAO is an accredited training organization by the Games and Amusements Board, the Philippine government's regulating body for professional sports in the country.
