= 2006 in Universal Reality Combat Championship =

Information
- First date: May 20, 2006
- Last date: December 2, 2006

Events
- Total events: 2

Fights
- Total fights: 21

Chronology
2005 in URCC	2006 in Universal Reality Combat Championship	2007 in URCC

The year 2006 is the 5th year in the history of the Universal Reality Combat Championship, a mixed martial arts promotion based in the Philippines. In 2006 the URCC held 2 events beginning with, URCC 8: Undisputed.

== Events list ==
#	Event title	Date	Arena	Location
9	URCC 9: Unstoppable	December 2, 2006	The Arena	San Juan, Metro Manila, Philippines
8	URCC 8: Undisputed	May 20, 2006	The Arena	San Juan, Metro Manila, Philippines

== URCC 8: Undisputed ==
URCC 8: Undisputed was an event held on May 20, 2006 at The Arena in San Juan, Metro Manila, Philippines.

=== Results ===
Main Card
Weight class				Method	Round	Time	Notes
	Erwin Tagle	vs.	Richard Lasprilla	Draw	2	20:00
	Rogelio TJ Tiu	def.	Adolf Gannaban	TKO (Punches)	1	3:01
	Caloy Baduria	def.	Philip Yeung	TKO (Punches)	1	1:25
	Rey Docyogen	def.	Jeanyce Baga	TKO (Punches)	1	5:11
	Lino Tagacay	def.	Edgar Costillas	Submission (Armbar)	1	2:21
	Charlie Angel	vs.	Vicente Valdueza	Draw	2	20:00
	Roldan Cartajena	vs.	Darwin Buenaobra	Draw	2	20:00
	Glenn Sumanoy	def.	Arnel Arancina	Submission (Armbar)	1	3:40
	Paul Cortez	def.	Charry de la Cruz	TKO (Punches)	1	1:00
	Don David	vs.	Dennis Salazar	Draw	2	20:00

== URCC 9: Unstoppable ==
URCC 9: Unstoppable was an event held on December 2, 2006 at The Arena in San Juan, Metro Manila, Philippines.

=== Results ===
Main Card
Weight class				Method	Round	Time	Notes
	Richard Lasprilla	vs.	Erwin Tagle	Draw	2	10:00
	Rogelio TJ Tiu	def.	Phil Bryner	TKO (Punches)	1	6:15
	Mark Sangiao	def.	Steven Ramos	Submission (Armbar)	1	0:12
	Luisito Il Sangalang	def.	Wennie Paderna	Submission (Kimura)	1	8:03
	Jeanyce Baga	vs.	Raj Dulay	Draw	2	10:00
	Benjie Gloria	def.	Jam Medina	Submission (Rear-Naked Choke)	2	1:18
	Charlie Angel	def.	Carlos Tiongson	KO	2	1:22
	Caloy Baduria	def.	Dare Malecdan	KO	1	6:56
	Populi Gutierez	def.	Vicente Valdueza	Submission (Armbar)	1	9:10
	Ricky Pat	def.	Freddie Magada	TKO (Punches)	1	8:50
	Aden Zarco	vs.	Roldan Cartajena	Draw	2	10:00
