= 2008 in Universal Reality Combat Championship =

Information
- First date: July 5, 2008
- Last date: November 22, 2008

Events
- Total events: 5

Fights
- Total fights: 39

Chronology
2007 in URCC	2008 in Universal Reality Combat Championship	2009 in URCC

The year 2008 is the 7th year in the history of the Universal Reality Combat Championship, a mixed martial arts promotion based in the Philippines. In 2008 the URCC held 5 events beginning with, URCC 12: Supremacy.

== Events list ==
#	Event title	Date	Arena	Location
17	URCC 13: Indestructible	November 22, 2008	A-Venue Events Hall	Makati, Metro Manila, Philippines
16	URCC Cebu 3: Nemesis	November 15, 2008	Cebu International Convention Centre	Cebu, Philippines
15	URCC Rouge Magazine's Black Tie Brawl 2008	October 18, 2008	Hyatt Hotel Manila	Metro Manila, Philippines
14	URCC 12: Supremacy	July 5, 2008	A. Venue Events Hall	Makati, Metro Manila, Philippines
13	URCC Cebu 2	March 1, 2008	Waterfront City Hotel	Cebu, Philippines

== URCC Cebu 2 ==
URCC Cebu 2 was an event held on March 1, 2008 at The Waterfront City Hotel in Cebu, Philippines.

=== Results ===
Main Card
Weight class				Method	Round	Time	Notes
	Cary Bullos	def.	Tony Donaire	Submission (Punches)	1	2:00
	Andrew Benibe	def.	Rodel Chua	Submission	0	0:00
	Alan Factura	def.	Neil Dungog	N/A	0	0:00
	Gian Vicuna	def.	Demetrio Dela Torre	Decision (Split)	0	0:00
	Maxilito Yong	def.	Eugene Yunque	Decision (Split)	0	0:00
	Aaron Guillermo	def.	Jonamar Macaraya	TKO	0	0:00
	Rogelio Plomeda	def.	Arnel Arancina	Submission (Rear naked choke)	0	0:00
	Mike Tabamo	def.	Edmund Fernandez	Submission (Rear naked choke)	0	0:00
	Jet Lumawag	def.	Geronimo Etac	KO	1	0:20
	Marcus Valda	def.	Benjie Gloria	Submission (Armbar)	1	0:20
	Jessie Rafols	def.	Charlie Angel	N/A	0	0:00

== URCC 12: Supremacy ==
URCC 12: Supremacy was an event held on July 5, 2008 at A. Venue Events Hall in Makati, Metro Manila, Philippines.

=== Results ===
Main Card
Weight class				Method	Round	Time	Notes
	Eduard Folayang	def.	Caloy Baduria	TKO (Punches)	1	3:41
	Justin Cruz	def.	Lino Tagacay	Submission (Kneebar)	2	5:16
	Kevin Belingon	def.	Magellan Perez	Submission (Kimura)	1	4:01
	Seyed Razi Jabbari	def.	Panchito Estrada	TKO (Punches)	1	4:47
	Earl Uy	def.	Dennis Valmores	TKO (Punches)	1	0:52
	Roldan Cartajena	def.	Marlon Abrigoso	Submission (Rear-Naked Choke)	1	4:21
	Noble Ampoc	def.	Robert Serdone	Submission (Rear-Naked Choke)	1	3:56
	Lando Espinosa	def.	John Naval	Submission (Armbar)	1	1:24
	Cary Bullos	def.	Arnel Arancina	Submission (Rear-Naked Choke)	1	4:44
	Jerry Legaspi	def.	Anthony Dominic So	Submission (Rear-Naked Choke)	1	2:27

== URCC Rouge Magazine's Black Tie Brawl 2008 ==
URCC Rouge Magazine's Black Tie Brawl 2008 was an event held on October 18, 2008 at The Hyatt Hotel Manila in Metro Manila, Philippines.

=== Results ===
Main Card
Weight class				Method	Round	Time	Notes
	Rey Docyogen	def.	Noble Ampoc	Submission (Rear-Naked Choke)	1	2:00
	Lino Tagacay	def.	Magellan Perez	DQ	1	6:14
	Andrew Benibe	def.	Dennis Padua	Submission (Guillotine Choke)	1	2:04
	Carl Sabeniano	def.	Salvador Domasian	Submission (Gogoplata)	1	4:59
	Lando Espinosa	def.	Marlon Abrigoso	KO (Punches)	1	0:18
	Jerry Legaspi	def.	Karlo Sevilla	TKO (Punches)	1	5:04
	Jessie Rafols	def.	Robert Serdone	KO (Punch)	1	0:11
	Jerson Estoro	def.	Arnel Arancina	TKO (Punches)	1	3:26

== URCC Cebu 3: Nemesis ==
URCC Cebu 3: Nemesis was an event held on November 15, 2008 at The Cebu International Convention Centre in Cebu, Philippines.

== URCC 13: Indestructible ==
URCC 13: Indestructible was an event held on November 22, 2008 at The A-Venue Events Hall in Makati, Metro Manila, Philippines.

=== Results ===
Main Card
Weight class				Method	Round	Time	Notes
	Kevin Belingon	def.	Justin Cruz	Decision (Unanimous)	2	10:00
	Tiequan Zhang	def.	Caloy Baduria	Submission (Guillotine Choke)	1	3:03
	Eduard Folayang	def.	Jerry Legaspi	TKO (Punches and Kicks to the Body)	1	0:15
	Ali Khatibi	def.	Carl Sabeniano	Submission (Kimura)	2	5:59
	Rey Docyogen	def.	Jesus Rabadon	TKO (Punches)	1	7:52
	Gello Reyes	def.	Dennis Padua	Submission (Rear-Naked Choke)	1	7:34
	Lando Espinosa	def.	Ramonito Pabroa	Submission (Armbar)	1	1:10
	Noble Ampoc	def.	Sherwin Dagohoy	Decision (Unanimous)	2	10:00
	Jessie Rafols	def.	Jayco Madrona	Submission (Armbar)	1	1:16
	Jerson Estoro	def.	Lawrence Chan	TKO (Punches)	1	2:14

== See also ==
- Universal Reality Combat Championship
