= 2002 in Universal Reality Combat Championship =

Information
- First date: November 23, 2002
- Last date: November 23, 2002

Events
- Total events: 1

Fights
- Total fights: 19

Chronology
2002 in Universal Reality Combat Championship	2003 in URCC

The year 2002 is the 1st year in the history of the Universal Reality Combat Championship, a mixed martial arts promotion based in the Philippines. In 2002 the URCC held 1 event, URCC 1: Mayhem in Manila.

== Events list ==
#	Event title	Date	Arena	Location
1	URCC 1: Mayhem in Manila	November 23, 2002	Casino Filipino	Parañaque, Metro Manila, Philippines

== URCC 1: Mayhem in Manila ==
URCC 1: Mayhem in Manila was an event held on November 23, 2002 at the Casino Filipino in Parañaque, Metro Manila, Philippines.

=== Results ===
Main Card
Weight class				Method	Round	Time	Notes
	Michael Sandoval	def.	Randy Toralba	KO (Knees & Punches)	1	0:25
	Mike Banayad	def.	Roderic Chavez	Submission (Rear Naked Choke)	1	0:55
	Francis Pisa	def.	Rhollie Tanjay	Submission (Guillotine Choke)	1	0:17
	James San Agustin	def.	Joel Bueza	Submission (Rear Naked Choke)	1	9:35
	Daniel Foronda Jr.	def.	Gerry Calaycay	Submission (Heel Hook)	1	4:30
	Allan Co	def.	Peter Pedroza	Submission (Armbar)	1	2:00
	Louie Yap	def.	Hermes Bueza Sr.	KO (Punches)	1	0:30
	Gary Garay	def.	Carlos Andrade	KO (Punches)	1	0:40
	Manuel Silvano	def.	Erex Solar	TKO (Punches & Knees)	1	2:05
	Christian Wong	def.	Omar Guiang	Submission (Rear Naked Choke)	1	2:45
	Robbie Reyes	def.	Ravinder Sogi	TKO (Punches)	2	1:30
	Emerson Mateo	def.	Sotero Quijano	Submission (Exhaustion)	2	7:45
	Richard Lasprilla	def.	Hermes Bueza Jr.	Submission (Rear Naked Choke)	1	3:20
	Glenn Sumanoy	def.	Nas Solar	Submission (Triangle Choke)	1	3:40
	Larry Montejo	def.	Glenn Evangelista	TKO (Punches)	2	5:17
	Jhun Pecaoco	def.	Renato Velasco	TKO (Punches)	1	3:35
	Rogelio TJ Tiu	def.	Del Bacho	TKO (Punches)	1	1:35
	Darwin Buenaobra	def.	Patrick Gatan	Submission (Armbar)	1	6:10
	Nilo Oreo	vs.	Jeanyce Baga	Draw	2	20:00

== See also ==
- Universal Reality Combat Championship
