= 2004 in Universal Reality Combat Championship =

Information
- First date: April 24, 2004
- Last date: October 23, 2004

Events
- Total events: 2

Fights
- Total fights: 21

Chronology
2003 in URCC	2004 in Universal Reality Combat Championship	2005 in URCC

The year 2004 is the 3rd year in the history of the Universal Reality Combat Championship, a mixed martial arts promotion based in the Philippines. In 2004 the URCC held 2 events beginning with, URCC 4: Return to the Dungeon.

== Events list ==
#	Event title	Date	Arena	Location
5	URCC 5: Beyond Fear	October 23, 2004	Casino Filipino	Parañaque, Metro Manila, Philippines
4	URCC 4: Return to the Dungeon	April 24, 2004	Casino Filipino	Parañaque, Metro Manila, Philippines

== URCC 4: Return to the Dungeon ==
URCC 4: Return to the Dungeon was an event held on April 24, 2004 at Casino Filipino in Parañaque, Metro Manila, Philippines.

=== Results ===
Main Card
Weight class				Method	Round	Time	Notes
	Richard Lasprilla	def.	Charlie Angel	Submission (Rear Naked Choke)	1	8:23
	Caloy Baduria	def.	Mike Banayad	TKO (Punches)	1	5:19
	Mark Sangiao	def.	Miguel Chavez	Submission (Rear Naked Choke)	1	7:58
	Rogelio TJ Tiu	def.	Ravinder Sogi	TKO (Punches)	2	2:03
	Luisito Il Sangalang	def.	Rolando Pritos	Submission (Rear Naked Choke)	1	9:38
	Glenn Sumanoy	def.	Darwin Buenaobra	Submission (Punches)	1	10:00
	Larry Montejo	def.	Peter Mesolania	Submission (Punches)	1	6:54
	Rolly Chulhang	def.	Ronald Gavileno	Submission (Punches)	2	5:23
	Wennie Paderna	def.	Randy Biron	KO	1	8:28
	Jeanyce Baga	def.	Ronaldo Morata	TKO (Punches)	1	9:26
	Dare Malecdan	def.	Karlo Sevilla	TKO (Exhaustion)	1	7:41
	Arnel Arancina	def.	Aljon Corporal	Decision
	Lino Tagacay	def.	Edwin Tayag	DQ (Illegal Punch)	R1

== URCC 5: Beyond Fear ==
URCC 5: Beyond Fear was an event held on October 23, 2004 at Casino Filipino in Parañaque, Metro Manila, Philippines.

=== Results ===
Main Card
Weight class				Method	Round	Time	Notes
	Allan Co	def.	Caloy Baduria	Submission (Armbar)	1	5:50
	Mark Sangiao	def.	Lino Tagacay	Submission (Rear Naked Choke)	1	9:57
	Ed Lavelle	def.	Glenn Evangelista	Submission (Rear Naked Choke)	1	3:09
	Jeanyce Baga	def.	Ronnie Catampatan	Submission (Triangle Choke)	1	2:39
	Mike Banayad	vs.	Rodrigo Asiong	Draw	2	10:00
	Charlie Angel	def.	Larry Montejo	KO (Slam)	2	9:41
	Erwin Tagle	def.	Rolly Chulhang	Submission (Guillotine Choke)	1	7:18
	Phil Bryner	def.	Robinson Dalupan	KO	1	1:18
	Salvador Domasian	vs.	Steven Ramos	Draw	2	10:00
	Roldan Cartajena	def.	Randy Biron	Submission (Injury)	1	3:33

== See also ==
- Universal Reality Combat Championship
