= URCC Fight Night: Choi vs Isuekpe =

URCC Fight Night: Choi vs. Isuekpe
- The poster for URCC Fight Night: Choi vs. Isuekpe
- Promotion: Universal Reality Combat Championship
- Date: July 18, 2026
- Venue: Octopus Makati
- City: Makati City, Philippines

Event chronology
URCC Fight Club 1	URCC Fight Night: Choi vs. Isuekpe

URCC Fight Night: Choi vs. Isuekpe was a mixed martial arts event produced by the Universal Reality Combat Championship that took place on July 18, 2026, at the Octopus Makati in Makati City, Philppines.

== Background ==
This event marked the promotion's sixth fight night event since 2014. It was also the third held at Octopus Makati.

A lightweight bout between Choi Jong-In and Emmanuel Isuekpe headlined the event. The co-main event was a featherweight bout between Chan Sung Nak and Alex Asio Jr.

== Results ==
{{{1}}}
Weight class				Method	Round	Time	Notes
Lightweight	Emmanuel Isuekpe	def.	Choi Jong-In	TKO (Ground and Pound)	2	0:45
Featherweight	Chan Sung Nak	def.	Alex Asio Jr.	Decision (Split)	3	3:00
Lightweight	Jerald Villarde	def.	Jimmy Balderas	Submission (Rear naked choke)	1	1:25
Flyweight	Chuckie Ruiz	def.	John Lawrence Tuquero	Decision (Unanimous)	3	3:00
Flyweight	Rene Catalan Jr.	def.	Christian Labalan	Submission (Rear naked choke)	1	0:45
Lightweight	Ed Gabrylle Conche	def.	Tonio Segismundo	TKO	1	3:25
Flyweight	MJ Badillo	def.	Juro Amandoron	TKO	1	2:30
Featherweight	Joshua Corpuz	def.	Jordan Cruz	KO (punches)	1	0:55
