= 2005 in Universal Reality Combat Championship =

Information
- First date: June 25, 2005
- Last date: December 10, 2005

Events
- Total events: 2

Fights
- Total fights: 21

Chronology
| 2004 in URCC | 2005 in Universal Reality Combat Championship | 2006 in URCC |

The year 2005 is the 4th year in the history of the Universal Reality Combat Championship, a mixed martial arts promotion based in the Philippines. In 2005 the URCC held 2 events beginning with, URCC 6: Unleashed Fury.

== Events list ==
| # | Event Title | Date | Arena | Location |
|---|---|---|---|---|
| 7 | URCC 7: The Art of War | December 10, 2005 | Araneta Coliseum | Quezon City, Metro Manila, Philippines |
| 6 | URCC 6: Unleashed Fury | June 25, 2005 | Casino Filipino | Parañaque, Metro Manila, Philippines |

== URCC 6: Unleashed Fury ==
URCC 6: Unleashed Fury was an event held on June 25, 2005 at Casino Filipino in Parañaque, Metro Manila, Philippines.

=== Results ===
Main Card
| Weight class | | | | Method | Round | Time | Notes |
|---|---|---|---|---|---|---|---|
| | Richard Lasprilla | vs. | Erwin Tagle | Draw | 2 | 10:00 |
| | Rogelio TJ Tiu | def. | Phil Bryner | TKO (Punches) | 1 | 6:15 |
| | Mark Sangiao | def. | Steven Ramos | Submission (Armbar) | 1 | 0:12 |
| | Luisito Il Sangalang | def. | Wennie Paderna | Submission (Kimura) | 1 | 8:03 |
| | Jeanyce Baga | vs. | Raj Dulay | Draw | 2 | 10:00 |
| | Benjie Gloria | def. | Jam Medina | Submission (Rear-Naked Choke) | 2 | 1:18 |
| | Charlie Angel | def. | Carlos Tiongson | KO | 2 | 1:22 |
| | Caloy Baduria | def. | Dare Malecdan | KO | 1 | 6:56 |
| | Populi Gutierez | def. | Vicente Valdueza | Submission (Armbar) | 1 | 9:10 |
| | Ricky Pat | def. | Freddie Magada | TKO (Punches) | 1 | 8:50 |
| | Aden Zarco | vs. | Roldan Cartajena | Draw | 2 | 10:00 |

== URCC 7: The Art of War ==
URCC 7: The Art of War was an event held on December 10, 2005 at the Araneta Coliseum in Quezon City, Metro Manila, Philippines.

=== Results ===
Main Card
| Weight class | | | | Method | Round | Time | Notes |
|---|---|---|---|---|---|---|---|
| | He Peng | def. | Mark Sangiao | KO | 1 | 9:18 |
| | Caloy Baduria | def. | Benjie Gloria | TKO (Punches) | 1 | 4:26 |
| | Hailin Ao | def. | Christian Wong | Submission (Armbar) | 1 | 8:46 |
| | Dai Shuang Hai | def. | Mike Banayad | Submission (Rear Naked Choke) | 1 | 9:13 |
| | Tiequan Zhang | def. | Salvador Domasian | TKO (Punches) | 1 | 4:48 |
| | Lino Tagacay | def. | Charlie Angel | TKO (Punches) | 1 | 5:54 |
| | Wennie Paderna | def. | Karlo Sevilla | TKO (Exhaustion) | 1 | 8:36 |
| | Vicente Valdueza | def. | Luke Mark Catubig | TKO (Exhaustion) | 2 | 3:49 |
| | Deo Anacio | def. | Ricky Pat | Submission (Guillotine Choke) | 1 | 2:50 |
| | Benjo Penzon III | def. | Kenichi Klemann | Submission (Armbar) | 1 | 7:28 |

== See also ==
- Universal Reality Combat Championship
