= 2011 in Universal Reality Combat Championship =

Information
- First date: January 14, 2011
- Last date: November 19, 2011

Events
- Total events: 9

Fights
- Total fights: 67

Chronology
2010 in URCC	2011 in Universal Reality Combat Championship	2012 in URCC

The year 2011 is the 10th year in the history of the Universal Reality Combat Championship, a mixed martial arts promotion based in the Philippines. In 2011 the URCC held 9 events beginning with, URCC Cebu 6: Respect.

== Events list ==
#	Event Title	Date	Arena	Location
43	URCC: Rogue Magazine's Black Tie Brawl 2011	November 19, 2011	New World Hotel	Makati, Metro Manila, Philippines
42	URCC 20: XX	November 5, 2011	World Trade Center	Pasay, Metro Manila, Philippines
41	URCC: Bacolod Brawl 2011	October 16, 2011	L'Fisher Hotel	Bacolod, Negros Occidental, Philippines
40	URCC: University Challenge 2011	September 9, 2011	One Esplanade	Pasay, Metro Manila, Philippines
39	URCC: Tribal Gear: Dutdutan Tattoo Festival 2011	August 26, 2011	World Trade Center	Pasay, Metro Manila, Philippines
38	URCC: Davao Digmaan 3	August 21, 2011	Garden Oases Resort & Convention Center	Davao City, Philippines
37	URCC 19: Collision	April 2, 2011	World Trade Center	Pasay, Metro Manila, Philippines
36	URCC Baguio 3: Invasion	February 19, 2011	Baguio Convention Center	Baguio, Philippines
35	URCC Cebu 6: Respect	January 14, 2011	Cebu International Convention Center	Cebu City, Philippines

== URCC Cebu 6: Respect ==
URCC Cebu 6: Respect was an event held on January 14, 2011 at The Cebu International Convention Center in Cebu City, Philippines.

=== Results ===
Main Card
Weight class				Method	Round	Time	Notes
	Leonard Delarmino	def.	Cary Bullos	TKO (Corner Stoppage)	2	5:30
	Tom Woodfin	def.	Ricardo Sapno	Submission (Rear-Naked Choke)	1	3:44
	Jimmy Yabo	vs.	George Flansbaum	NC (Refusal to Fight)	2	6:54
	Victor Torre	def.	Mark Revalde	Submission (Punches)	1	1:06
	Agustin Delarmino	def.	Maxilito Yong	TKO (Retirement)	1	3:32
	Vaughn Donayre	def.	Lorde Rey Yamit	Submission (Rear-Naked Choke)	1	4:55
	Philip Delarmino	def.	Johnjier Edu Torbiso	TKO (Punches)	1	1:14
	Reynan Noblefranca	def.	Jessie Tambiling	TKO (Punches)	1	7:43

== URCC Baguio 3: Invasion ==
URCC Baguio 3: Invasion was an event held on February 19, 2011 at The Baguio Convention Center in Baguio, Philippines.

=== Results ===
Main Card
Weight class				Method	Round	Time	Notes
	Mark Striegl	def.	Crisanto Pitpitunge	Submission (Rear-Naked Choke)	1	5:37
	Arnold Agapito	def.	Marko Huusansaari	TKO (Punches)	1	0:59
	Honorio Banario	def.	Seyed Razi Jabbari	Submission (Punches)	1	1:35
	Geje Eustaquio	def.	Rex Wa-O	Submission (Punches)	1	0:49
	Efren Bayongan Jr.	def.	Keiff Mangusan	Submission (Rear-Naked Choke)	1	6:13
	Jerome Wanawan	def.	Redentor Saclag	TKO (Punches)	1	6:28
	Dario Banario	def.	Johnson Kayachen	TKO (Punches)	1	3:29
	Adam Cacay	def.	Reysaldo Biagtan	TKO (Punches)	1	3:04
	Egly Diaz	def.	Johnny Bitaga	Submission (Armbar)	1	1:12

== URCC 19: Collision ==
URCC 19: Collision was an event held on April 2, 2011 at The World Trade Center in Pasay, Metro Manila, Philippines.

=== Results ===
Main Card
Weight class				Method	Round	Time	Notes
	Rey Docyogen	def.	Alvin Ramirez	Decision (Unanimous)	2	10:00
	Honorio Banario	def.	Angelito Manguray	Submission (Rear-Naked Choke)	2	8:48
	Jessie Rafols	def.	Hideo Morikawa	Submission (Rear-Naked Choke)	1	3:27
	Kevin Belingon	def.	Isaac Tuling	TKO (Head Kick and Punches)	1	6:25
	Christian Luna	def.	Frank Navarro	TKO (Punches)	1	1:44
	Reydon Romero	def.	Franz Altarejos	KO (Punches)	1	0:46
	Andrew Benibe	def.	Michael Dan Rubio	Submission (Triangle Choke)	2	3:17
	Jilmar Tangayan	def.	Agustin Delarmino	Decision (Split)	2	10:00
	Karl Rodriguezf	de.	Dowen Dela Tonga	Submission (Rear-Naked Choke)	1	2:30
	Bernard Soriano	def.	Charles de Tomas	Submission (Brabo Choke)	1	1:33

== URCC: Davao Digmaan 3 ==
URCC: Davao Digmaan 3 was an event held on August 21, 2011 at The Garden Oases Resort & Convention Center in Davao City, Philippines.

=== Results ===
Main Card
Weight class				Method	Round	Time	Notes
	Honorio Banario	def.	Alcer Lozada	KO (Head Kick)	2	0:26
	Isaac Tuling	def.	Benjie Lumacad	Submission (Elbows)	2	0:00
	Ricardo Sapno	def.	Lorde Rey Yamit	Submission (Guillotine Choke)	1	1:04
	Eduard Manteza	def.	Armando Cole	Submission (Rear-Naked Choke)	1	0:00
	Orlimer Celeste	def.	Marlon Perocho	Submission (Punches)	1	0:00
	Glen Balaba	def.	Jhun del Valle	TKO (Punches)	1	7:59
	Jonathan Sumogat	def.	Daniel Solis	Submission (Rear-Naked Choke)	1	0:47
	Flash Val Casas	def.	Eric Malusay	Submission (Guillotine Choke)	1	0:00

== URCC: Tribal Gear: Dutdutan Tattoo Festival 2011 ==
URCC: Tribal Gear: Dutdutan Tattoo Festival 2011 was an event held on August 26, 2011 at The World Trade Center in Pasay, Metro Manila, Philippines.

=== Results ===
Main Card
Weight class				Method	Round	Time	Notes
	Jerson Estoro	def.	Dowen Dela Tonga	Submission (Punches)	1	0:00
	Roldan Cartajena	def.	Ronald Postrano	Submission (Rear-Naked Choke)	2	0:50
	Roy Doliguez	def.	Leo Occena	Submission (Punches)	1	2:19
	Lando Espinosa	def.	Monico Allego	KO (Head Kick)	1	1:20
	Mark Dialogo	def.	Richard Alsado	Submission (Armbar)	1	1:16

== URCC: University Challenge 2011 ==
URCC: University Challenge 2011 was an event held on September 9, 2011 at The One Esplanade in Pasay, Metro Manila, Philippines.

== URCC: Bacolod Brawl 2011 ==
URCC: Bacolod Brawl 2011 was an event held on October 16, 2011 at The L'Fisher Hotel in Bacolod, Negros Occidental, Philippines.

=== Results ===
Main Card
Weight class				Method	Round	Time	Notes
	Victor Torre	def.	Ruel Catalan	Submission (Armbar)	1	8:28
	Rex de Lara	def.	Leonard Delarmino	Decision (Unanimous)	2	10:00
	Agustin Delarmino	def.	Alvin Ramirez	Decision (Split)	3	5:00
	Dennis Salazar	def.	Philip Delarmino	Submission (Rear-Naked Choke)	2	1:48
	Richie Redman	def.	Carl Sabeniano	Submission (Punches)	1	2:49
	Roldan Cartajena	def.	Arvien Baldelovar	Submission (Rear-Naked Choke)	2	1:48
	Jinel Lausa	def.	Ramie Crisostomo	Submission (Guillotine Choke)	1	6:50
	Ernie Braca	def.	Rendel Camensi	TKO (Retirement)	2	0:05
	Jan Silayro	def.	Rho Fajutrao	Submission (Injury)	1	0:21
	Luke Mark Catubig	def.	George Flansbaum	TKO (Leg Kicks)	1	1:50
	Rocky Batolbatol	def.	Elmer Tortogo	TKO (Punches)	1	6:54

== URCC 20: XX ==
URCC 20: XX was an event held on November 5, 2011 at The World Trade Center in Pasay, Metro Manila, Philippines.

=== Results ===
Main Card
Weight class				Method	Round	Time	Notes
	Reydon Romero	def.	Jessie Rafols	Submission (Punches)	1	5:27
	Nicholas Mann	def.	Christian Luna	Submission (Punches)	1	4:59
	Igor Subora	def.	Ryan Paglinawan	TKO (Punches)	1	0:49
	Froilan Sarenas	def.	Robin Jose	TKO (Punches)	1	1:42
	Will Chope	def.	Jerson Estoro	Submission (Guillotine Choke)	1	3:07
	Adam Cacay	def.	Lando Espinosa	Submission (Rear-Naked Choke)	1	1:23
	Honorio Banario	def.	Patrick Manicad	Submission (Armbar)	1	2:07
	Andrew Benibe	def.	Sulpiano Laurio Jr.	TKO (Knee and Punches)	1	5:37
	Pete Brooks	def.	Frank Navarro	Submission (Punches)	1	1:13
	Rodel Orais	def.	Jilmar Tangayan	Submission (Punches)	1	5:27

== URCC: Rogue Magazine's Black Tie Brawl 2011 ==
URCC: Rogue Magazine's Black Tie Brawl 2011 was an event held on November 19, 2011 at The New World Hotel in Makati, Metro Manila, Philippines.

=== Results ===
Main Card
Weight class				Method	Round	Time	Notes
	Ricardo Sapno	def.	Reydon Romero	TKO (Punches)	2	0:00
	Melchor Cases	def.	Mitch Malili	Submission (Rear Naked Choke)	1	4:26
	Alvin Ramirez	def.	Mark Dialogo	KO (Head Kick)	1	2:39
	Will Chope	def.	Miguel Alo	Submission (Standing Guillotine Choke)	1	3:34
	Keiff Mangusan	def.	Rendel Camensi	Submission (Rear Naked Choke)	1	0:36
	Mario Sismundo	def.	Bong Garchitorena	TKO (Punches)	1	0:00
