= 2003 in Universal Reality Combat Championship =

Information
- First date: April 12, 2003
- Last date: September 20, 2003

Events
- Total events: 2

Fights
- Total fights: 32

Chronology
2002 in URCC	2003 in Universal Reality Combat Championship	2004 in URCC

The year 2003 is the 2nd year in the history of the Universal Reality Combat Championship, a mixed martial arts promotion based in the Philippines. In 2003 the URCC held 2 events beginning with, URCC 2: Night of Champions.

== Events list ==
#	Event title	Date	Arena	Location
3	URCC 3: Siege at the Fort	September 20, 2003	The Fort	Taguig, Metro Manila, Philippines
2	URCC 2: Night of Champions	April 12, 2003	Phil Sports Arena	Pasig City, Metro Manila, Philippines

== URCC 2: Night of Champions ==
URCC 2: Night of Champions was an event held on April 12, 2003 at Phil Sports Arena in Pasig City, Metro Manila, Philippines.

=== Results ===
Main Card
Weight class				Method	Round	Time	Notes
	Andre Bispo Da Silva	vs.	Tony Torres	Draw	2	20:00
	Fritz Rodriguez	def.	Dit Torres	Submission (Punches)	1	2:00
	TJ Tiu	def.	Nico Dhaenen	TKO (Punches)	1	4:20
	Ronald Bingwaoel	def.	Wennie Paderna	Submission (Rear-Naked Choke)	1	7:30
	Darwin Buenaobra	def.	Larry Montejo	Submission (Rear-Naked Choke)	1	3:55
	Raffy Garcia	def.	Rommel Delis	Submission (Guillotine Choke)	1	3:35
	Richard Lasprilla	def.	Ronald Gavileno	Submission (Rear-Naked Choke)	1	3:05
	John Mark Fabila	def.	Ignacio Ibabao	Submission (Front Choke)	1	0:15
	Orlando Dulay	def.	Manuel Silvano	KO (Slam & Punches)	1	5:20
	Jerome Lepiten	def.	Randy Gundan	Submission (Rear-Naked Choke)	1	1:35
	Mike Banayad	vs.	Caloy Baduria	Draw	2	20:00
	Aden Zarco	def.	Jimmy Sablay	Submission (Rear-Naked Choke)	1	6:05
	Allan Co	def.	Rafael Noble	Submission (Rear-Naked Choke)	1	1:10
	Viel Araneta	def.	Nilo Oreo	Submission (Guillotine Choke)	1	6:45
	Luisito Sangalang II	def.	Edwin Tayag	TKO (Punches)	1	4:55
	Wilfredo Dablo	def.	Joevani Escriber	TKO (Punches)	1	2:00
	Glenn Sumanoy	def.	Emerson Mateo	Submission (Armbar)	1	4:00
	Charlie Angel	def.	Zaldy Intigro	KO (Punches)	1	4:30

== URCC 3: Siege at the Fort ==
URCC 3: Siege at the Fort was an event held on September 20, 2003 at The Fort in Taguig, Metro Manila, Philippines.

=== Results ===
Main Card
Weight class				Method	Round	Time	Notes
	Fritz Rodriguez	def.	Richie Lazaro	TKO (Punches)	1	9:10
	Richard Lasprilla	def.	Rolly Chulhang	Submission (Triangle Choke)	1	3:10
	Mike Banayad	def.	Wilfredo Dablo	TKO (Punches)	1	0:13
	Mark Sangiao	def.	Arnel Arancina	TKO (Punches)	2	1:10
	Wennie Paderna	vs.	Benjo Penzon III	Draw	2	10:00
	Charlie Angel	def.	Populi Gutierez	TKO (Leg Kicks & Hammer Fists)	1	6:55
	Joevani Escriber	def.	Rommel Del-Is	TKO (Punches)	1	2:30
	Rodrigo Asiong	def.	Dare Malecdan	TKO (Knees)	1	0:50
	Aden Zarco	vs.	Jayson Lepiten	Draw	2	10:00
	Rogelio TJ Tiu	def.	Benjie Gloria	TKO (Punches)	1	3:00
	Glenn Sumanoy	def.	Manuel Silvano	Submission (Armbar)	1	3:10
	Vicente Valdueza	vs.	Sulpiano Laurio Jr.	Draw	2	10:00
	Randy Biron	vs.	Jeanyce Baga	Draw	2	10:00

== See also ==
- Universal Reality Combat Championship
