= 2010 in Universal Reality Combat Championship =

Information
- First date: January 15, 2010
- Last date: November 13, 2010

Events
- Total events: 10

Fights
- Total fights: 80

Chronology
2009 in URCC	2010 in Universal Reality Combat Championship	2011 in URCC

The year 2010 is the 9th year in the history of the Universal Reality Combat Championship, a mixed martial arts promotion based in the Philippines. In 2010 the URCC held 10 events beginning with, URCC Cebu 5: Deliverance.

== Events list ==
#	Event title	Date	Arena	Location
34	URCC 18: Relenthless	November 13, 2010	A-Venue Events Hall	Makati, Metro Manila, Philippines
33	URCC: Rouge Magazine's Black Tie Brawl 2010	October 29, 2010	New World Hotel Makati	Makati, Metro Manila, Philippines
32	URCC: Bacolod Brawl 2010	October 17, 2010	Hotel PAGCOR	Bacolod, Philippines
31	URCC / Tribal Gear: Dutdutan Tattoo Festival 2010	September 24, 2010	World Trade Center	Pasay, Metro Manila, Philippines
30	URCC: University Challenge 2010	September 18, 2010	A-Venue Events Hall	Makati, Metro Manila, Philippines
29	URCC: Davao Digmaan 2	October 17, 2010	Garden Oases Resort & Convention Center	Davao City, Philippines
28	URCC 17: Havoc	July 24, 2010	A-Venue Events Hall	Makati, Metro Manila, Philippines
27	URCC 16: Reckoning	March 27, 2010	A-Venue Events Hall	Makati, Metro Manila, Philippines
26	URCC Baguio 2: Tribal Wars	February 19, 2010	Baguio Convention Center	Baguio, Philippines
25	URCC Cebu 5: Deliverance	January 15, 2010	Cebu International Convention Center	Cebu City, Philippines

== URCC Cebu 5: Deliverance ==
URCC Cebu 5: Deliverance was an event held on January 15, 2010 at The Cebu International Convention Center in Cebu City, Philippines.

=== Results ===
Main Card
Weight class				Method	Round	Time	Notes
	Tom Woodfin	def.	Seyed Razi Jabbari	KO (Head Kick)	1	6:36
	Richie Redman	def.	Engie Piloto	Submission (Punches)	1	9:21
	Aden Zarco	def.	Jerome Toribiso	Submission (Guillotine Choke)	1	2:29
	Maxilito Yong	def.	Remus Belguera	TKO (Punches)	1	2:01
	Jimmy Yabo	def.	Leo Gaerlan	KO (Punches)	2	5:59
	Victor Torre	def.	Demitrio de la Torre	Submission (Rear-Naked Choke)	2	7:22
	Jecar Vender	def.	Sevilla Intoy	Decision (Split)	2	10:00
	Geronimo Etac	def.	Wilfredo Cajurao Jr.	Submission (Punches)	1	1:31
	Jerlyn Liera	def.	Argie Junsay	TKO (Punches)	1	2:26
	Mark Revalde	def.	Siloy Analito	Decision (Unanimous)	2	10:00

== URCC Baguio 2: Tribal Wars ==
URCC Baguio 2: Tribal Wars was an event held on February 19, 2010 at the Baguio Convention Center in Baguio, Philippines.

=== Results ===
Main Card
Weight class				Method	Round	Time	Notes
	George Lusadan	def.	Leonard Caliwa	Submission (Rear-Naked Choke)	1	1:58
	Honorio Banario	def.	Rommel Del-Is	Submission (Kimura)	1	2:50
	Erwin Focad	def.	Adam Cacay	Submission (Rear-Naked Choke)	1	2:52
	Charlie Angel	def.	Joseph Amurao	TKO (Retirement)	1	10:00
	Gina Iniong	def.	Sonrex Patanao	Submission (Rear-Naked Choke)	1	3:52
	Remsen Alangsab	def.	Johnny Bitaga	Submission (Rear-Naked Choke)	1	2:49
	Delver Mangaoile	def.	Armando Daligdig	TKO (Punches)	1	3:33
	Egly Diaz	def.	Joemar Pasiwat	Submission (Triangle Choke)	1	4:57
	Jerome Wanawan	def.	Charlemagne Pakeo-an	Decision (Unanimous)	2	10:00
	James Amistad	def.	Johnson Badeng	TKO (Punches)	1	8:26

== URCC 16: Reckoning ==
URCC 16: Reckoning was an event held on March 27, 2010 at The A-Venue Events Hall in Makati, Metro Manila, Philippines.

=== Results ===
Main Card
Weight class				Method	Round	Time	Notes
	Eduard Folayang	def.	Doo Jae Jeong	TKO (Punches)	1	3:15
	Richard Lasprilla	def.	Angelo Estanol	Decision (Unanimous)	2	10:00
	George Lusadan	def.	Dindo Campo	Submission (Rear-Naked Choke)	1	3:54
	Igor Subora	def.	Nicholas Mann	TKO (Punches)	1	2:34
	Angelito Manguray	def.	Salvador Domasian	TKO (Punches)	1	6:19
	Charles de Tomas	def.	Jun Piacidad	Submission (Kimura)	1	1:21
	Alvin Ramirez	def.	Sonny Tubal	TKO (Punches)	1	0:21
	Jessie Rafols	def.	Erwin Focad	Submission (Rear-Naked Choke)	2	2:24
	Reydon Romero	def.	Jessie Salvador	Submission (Rear-Naked Choke)	1	5:20
	Jerson Estoro	def.	Roldan Cartajena	TKO (Punches)	1	2:57

== URCC 17: Havoc ==
URCC 17: Havoc was an event held on July 24, 2010 at The A-Venue Events Hall in Makati, Metro Manila, Philippines.

=== Results ===
Main Card
Weight class				Method	Round	Time	Notes
	Rey Docyogen	def.	Jordan Ogo	Submission (Rear-Naked Choke)	1	9:26
	Froilan Sarenas	def.	Seyed Razi Jabbari	Submission (Armbar)	1	5:50
	Reggie Amarante	def.	Charry de la Cruz	Decision (Unanimous)	2	10:00
	Eric Kelly	def.	Aden Zarco	Submission (Achilles Lock)	1	2:41
	Igor Subora	def.	Panchito Estrada	Submission (Rear-Naked Choke)	1	4:21
	Carl Sabeniano	def.	Jerson Estoro	KO (Spinning Backfist)	1	0:18
	Reysaldo Transmonte	def.	Lino Tagacay	Decision (Unanimous)	3	5:00
	Jessie Rafols	def.	Andrew Benibe	Submission (Kimura)	1	9:12
	Noel Norada	def.	Randy Megrino	Submission (Punches)	1	1:37
	Honorio Banario	def.	Bernard Soriano	Submission (Punches)	1	2:55

== URCC: Davao Digmaan 2 ==
URCC: Davao Digmaan 2 was an event held on October 17, 2010 at The Garden Oases Resort & Convention Center in Davao City, Philippines.

=== Results ===
Main Card
Weight class				Method	Round	Time	Notes
	Ricardo Sapno	def.	Rionover Patao	Submission (Armbar)	1	3:00
	Jose Campo III	def.	Rick Carlo Cubillas	Submission (Keylock)	1	3:10
	Isaac Tuling	def.	Sean Sasing	TKO (Punches)	1	0:13
	Danilo Elmore	def.	Lorde Rey Yamit	Submission (Keylock)	1	8:43
	Daniel Durro	def.	Eman Belleza	Decision (Unanimous)	2	10:00
	Ale Cali	def.	Philip Parcon	TKO (Punches)	1	7:25
	Benjie Lumacad	def.	Richard Alsado	Submission (Guillotine Choke)	1	1:12
	Orlimer Celeste	def.	Allan Trinidad	TKO (Punches)	1	1:08

== URCC: University Challenge 2010 ==
URCC: University Challenge 2010 was an event held on September 18, 2010 at The A-Venue Events Hall in Makati, Metro Manila, Philippines.

== URCC / Tribal Gear: Dutdutan Tattoo Festival 2010 ==
URCC / Tribal Gear: Dutdutan Tattoo Festival 2010 was an event held on September 24, 2010 at The World Trade Center in Pasay, Metro Manila, Philippines.

=== Results ===
Main Card
Weight class				Method	Round	Time	Notes
	Hideo Morikawa	def.	Charles De Tomas	TKO (Doctor Stoppage)	3	2:10
	Lando Espinosa	def.	John Victor Vizconde	Technical Submission (Armbar)	1	1:07
	Nicholas Mann	def.	Panchito Estrada	TKO (Punches)	1	4:50
	Reydon Romero	def.	Joward Agao	TKO (Shoulder Injury)	2	1:17
	Noel Norada	def.	Charry de la Cruz	Decision (Unanimous)	3	5:00

== URCC: Bacolod Brawl 2010 ==
URCC: Bacolod Brawl 2010 was an event held on October 17, 2010 at The Hotel PAGCOR in Bacolod, Philippines.

=== Results ===
Main Card
Weight class				Method	Round	Time	Notes
	Adrian Hillana	def.	Jennifer Biocales	TKO (Punches)	1	1:06
	Victor Torre	def.	Pablo Seneres	Submission (Kimura)	1	2:28
	Leonard Delarmino	def.	Luke Mark Catubig	Submission (Guillotine Choke)	1	4:20
	Agustin Delarmino	def.	Rogelio Plomeda	KO (Head Kick and Punches)	1	2:48
	Philip Delarmino	def.	Vidal Londres	TKO (Punches)	2	4:16
	Ace Tupas	def.	Franklin Lorana	Submission (Punches)	1	2:31
	Rex de Lara	def.	John Amorganda	Submission (Rear-Naked Choke)	1	3:36
	Eugene Yunque	def.	Argie Junsay	Submission (Armbar)	2	0:38
	Nilrax de Cafe	def.	Rodel Calbog	KO (Punches)	1	1:42

== URCC: Rouge Magazine's Black Tie Brawl 2010 ==
URCC: Rouge Magazine's Black Tie Brawl 2010 was an event held on October 29, 2010 at The New World Hotel Makati in Makati, Metro Manila, Philippines.

=== Results ===
Main Card
Weight class				Method	Round	Time	Notes
	Hideo Morikawa	def.	Aden Zarco	Submission (Armbar)	1	4:04
	Igor Subora	def.	Robertson Tubosa	KO (Punches)	1	3:00
	Charles de Tomas	def.	Roldan Cartajena	Submission (Kimura)	1	5:53
	Andrew Benibe	def.	Carl Sabeniano	TKO (Punches)	1	8:05
	Lando Espinosa	def.	Leo Occena	Submission (Kimura)	1	4:13
	Michael Dan Rubio	def.	Dowen Dela Tonga	Decision (Split)	2	10:00
	Miguel Alo	def.	Reydon Romero	Decision (Majority)	2	10:00
	Leonard Caliwa	def.	Noel Norada	TKO (Doctor Stoppage)	1	0:54

== URCC 18: Relenthless ==
URCC 18: Relenthless was an event held on November 13, 2010 at The A-Venue Events Hall in Makati, Metro Manila, Philippines.

=== Results ===
Main Card
Weight class				Method	Round	Time	Notes
	Froilan Sarenas	def.	Jerry Legaspi	Submission (Arm-Triangle Choke)	1	2:24
	Eric Kelly	def.	Nate Flores	Submission (Rear-Naked Choke)	1	2:52
	Jessie Rafols	def.	Jessie Salvador	Submission (Armbar)	1	1:01
	Sulpiano Laurio Jr.	def.	Reysaldo Transmonte	Decision (Majority)	2	10:00
	Nicholas Mann	def.	Frank Navarro	Submission (Toe Hold)	1	0:34
	Pete Brooks	def.	Jose Campo III	Submission (Punches)	1	2:22
	Alvin Ramirez	def.	Janito Bayot	Submission (Armbar)	1	2:08
	Leo Occena	def.	Noble Ampoc	Submission (Rear-Naked Choke)	1	1:37
	Arnel Arancina	def.	Roel Pacional	TKO (Punches)	1	1:22
	George Lusadan	def.	Mark Joseph Abrillo	Submission (Rear-Naked Choke)	1	6:33

== See also ==
- Universal Reality Combat Championship
