= 2009 in Universal Reality Combat Championship =

Information
- First date: March 7, 2009
- Last date: November 21, 2009

Events
- Total events: 7

Fights
- Total fights: 65

Chronology
2008 in URCC	2009 in Universal Reality Combat Championship	2010 in URCC

The year 2009 is the 8th year in the history of the Universal Reality Combat Championship, a mixed martial arts promotion based in the Philippines. In 2009 the URCC held 7 events beginning with, URCC Baguio: Rumble in the Highlands.

== Events list ==
#	Event title	Date	Arena	Location
24	URCC 15: Onslaught	November 21, 2009	World Trade Center	Pasay, Metro Manila, Philippines
23	URCC: Rouge Magazine's Black Tie Brawl 2009	October 24, 2009	Ranaissance Hotel Makati	Makati, Metro Manila, Philippines
22	URCC Bacolod Brawl 2009	October 17, 2009	West Negros Gym	Negros Occidental, Philippines
21	URCC Davao Digmaan 2009	August 23, 2009	Davao Convention Center	Davao City, Philippines
20	URCC Cebu 4: Proving Ground	June 20, 2009		Mandaue City, Cebu, Philippines
19	URCC 14: Aggression	July 18, 2009	A.Venue Events Hall	Makati, Metro Manila, Philippines
18	URCC Baguio: Rumble in the Highlands	March 7, 2009	Baguio Convention Center	Baguio, Philippines

== URCC Baguio: Rumble in the Highlands ==
URCC Baguio: Rumble in the Highlands was an event held on March 7, 2009 at the Baguio Convention Center in Baguio, Philippines.

=== Results ===
Main Card
Weight class				Method	Round	Time	Notes
	Mark Sangiao	def.	Reysaldo Biagtan	Submission (Armbar)	1	0:00
	George Lusadan	def.	Ereneo Galindez		1	0:00
	Edward Kelly	def.	Rommel Del-Is		1	0:00
	Erwin Focad	def.	Charlie Angel		1	0:00
	Felix Sangiao	def.	Charles de Tomas		1	0:00
	Remsen Alangsab	def.	June June Benito		1	0:00
	Reggie Amarante	def.	Carlo Juarez		2	0:00
	Ryan Tablac	def.	Harold Bucayo		1	0:00
	Mike Tabamo	def.	Michael Dan Rubio		1	0:00
	Crisanto Pitpitunge	def.	Lloyd Faruden		1	0:00

== URCC 14: Aggression ==
URCC 14: Aggression was an event held on July 18, 2009 at A.Venue Events Hall in Makati, Metro Manila, Philippines.

=== Results ===
Main Card
Weight class				Method	Round	Time	Notes
	Jimmy Yabo	def.	Arven Baldilovar	KO	0	0:00
	Agustin Delarmino	def.	Jonamar Macaraya	Submission (Guillotine choke)	0	0:00
	Tom Woodfin	def.	Richie Redman	Submission (Rear naked choke)	1	9:32
	Jerlyn Liera	def.	Jennifer Biocales	TKO	1	4:21
	Leonard Delarmino	def.	Leo Gaerlan	TKO	2	6:00
	Maxilito Yong	def.	Alvin Amistoso	TKO	1	2:36
	Demetrio Dela Torre	def.	Philip Delarmino	TKO (Strikes)	1	0:46
	Sabah Fadai	def.	Andrew Benibe	Decision	2	0:00
	Mark Eddiva	def.	Engie Piloto	Submission (Rear naked choke)	1	3:44

== URCC Cebu 4: Proving Ground ==
URCC Cebu 4: Proving Ground was an event held on June 20, 2009 in Mandaue City, Cebu, Philippines.

=== Results ===
Main Card
Weight class				Method	Round	Time	Notes
	Eduard Folayang	def.	A.J. Aguon	Decision (Unanimous)	2	10:00
	Caloy Baduria	def.	Remand Lazaro	Submission (Exhaustion)	1	9:01
	Vicente Pajaro	def.	Panchito Estrada	Submission (Armbar)	1	4:08
	Mike Natividad	def.	Ruben Sumido	Submission (Rear-Naked Choke)	1	1:19
	Reggie Amarante	def.	Raymond Carlos	TKO (Punches)	2	3:03
	Eric Kelly	def.	Robert Buminaang	Submission (Rear-Naked Choke)	1	2:00
	Salvador Domasian	def.	Richie Redman	Submission (Rear-Naked Choke)	1	2:39
	Erwin Focad	def.	Lando Espinosa	TKO (Shoulder Injury)	1	1:03
	Charles de Tomas	def.	Franz Altarejos	TKO (Punches)	1	9:53
	Jet Lumawag	def.	Joel Taon	TKO (Punches)	1	6:34

== URCC Davao Digmaan 2009 ==
URCC Davao Digmaan 2009 was an event held on August 23, 2009 at The Davao Convention Center in Davao City, Philippines.

=== Results ===
Main Card
Weight class				Method	Round	Time	Notes
	Angelito Manguray	def.	Jerry Legaspi	TKO (Punches)	1	2:50
	Alcer Lozada	def.	Jubert Minguito	Submission (Rear-Naked Choke)	1	2:07
	Ramon Gonzales	def.	Jemerey Quinonero	KO (Punches)	1	0:43
	Benjie Lumacad	def.	Jilmar Tangayan	Decision (Split)	3	15:00
	Salvador Larozza	def.	Ale Cali	TKO (Punches)	1	5:24
	Isaac Tuling	def.	Pablo Blacano	Submission (Rear-Naked Choke)	1	1:34
	Ricardo Sapno	def.	Urtych Alarin	TKO (Punches)	2	2:49
	Eman Belleza	def.	Daniel Durro	Submission (Rear-Naked Choke)	1	1:17

== URCC Bacolod Brawl 2009 ==
URCC Bacolod Brawl 2009 was an event held on October 17, 2009 at The West Negros Gym in Negros Occidental, Philippines.

=== Results ===
Main Card
Weight class				Method	Round	Time	Notes
	Marciano Basas	def.	Dennis Retada	Submission (Rear-Naked Choke)	1	1:15
	Leonard Delarmino	def.	Joemarie Penero	TKO (Punches)	1	6:58
	Philip Delarmino	def.	Jet Lumawag	TKO (Punches)	1	1:07
	Agustin Delarmino	def.	Jemerey Quinonero	Decision (Unanimous)	2	10:00
	Rogelio Plomeda	def.	Salvador Larozza	TKO (Punches)	1	8:56
	John Amorganda	def.	Jubert Minguito	TKO (Punches)	2	2:02
	Oliver Tortocion	vs.	Franklin Lorana	No Contest	1	0:00
	Victor Torre	def.	Jennifer Biocales	Submission (Rear-Naked Choke)	1	1:37
	Nilrax de Cafe	def.	Kit Gregorio	Submission (Rear-Naked Choke)	1	1:53
	Gabriel Hembra	def.	Arvijohn Paclibar	KO (Punch)	1	0:10

== URCC: Rouge Magazine's Black Tie Brawl 2009 ==
URCC: Rouge Magazine's Black Tie Brawl 2009 was an event held on October 24, 2009 at The Ranaissance Hotel Makati in Makati, Metro Manila, Philippines.

=== Results ===
Main Card
Weight class				Method	Round	Time	Notes
	Kevin Belingon	def.	Jilmar Tangayan	Decision (Unanimous)	3	5:00
	Angelito Manguray	def.	Seyed Razi Jabbari	TKO (Punches)	1	3:20
	Reggie Amarante	def.	Jan Jan Traza	Decision (Unanimous)	2	10:00
	Eric Kelly	def.	Magellan Perez	Submission (Rear-Naked Choke)	2	2:30
	Hideo Morikawa	def.	Roldan Cartajena	TKO (Doctor Stoppage)	1	4:41
	Pete Brooks	def.	Igor Subora	Submission (Rear-Naked Choke)	1	4:29
	Charlie Angel	def.	Alvin Ramirez	Decision (Unanimous)	2	10:00
	Rad Llanasa	def.	Warren Franco	TKO (Punches)	1	4:00

== URCC 15: Onslaught ==
URCC 15: Onslaught was an event held on November 21, 2009 at The World Trade Center in Pasay, Metro Manila, Philippines.

=== Results ===
Main Card
Weight class				Method	Round	Time	Notes
	Justin Cruz	def.	Mark Sangiao	Submission (Guillotine Choke)	1	3:05
	Tiequan Zhang	def.	Caloy Baduria	Submission (Armbar)	1	4:21
	Ali Khatibi	vs.	Andrew Benibe	NC (Doctor Stoppage Due to Accidental Eye Poke)	1	6:32
	Marcus Valda	def.	Vicente Pajaro	TKO (Corner Stoppage)	1	6:03
	Rey Docyogen	def.	Alvin Ramirez	Decision (Unanimous)	2	10:00
	George Lusadan	def.	Lando Espinosa	Submission (Guillotine Choke)	1	4:36
	Sabah Fadai	def.	Aden Zarco	KO (Head Kick)	1	2:39
	Eric Kelly	def.	Michael Dan Rubio	Submission (Rear-Naked Choke)	1	4:00
	Jilmar Tangayan	def.	Mags Gonzalez	TKO (Punches)	1	4:38
	Hideo Morikawa	def.	Ramonito Pabroa	Submission (Armbar)	1	2:07

== See also ==
- Universal Reality Combat Championship
