= Eduard Folayang =

Filipino mixed martial arts fighter

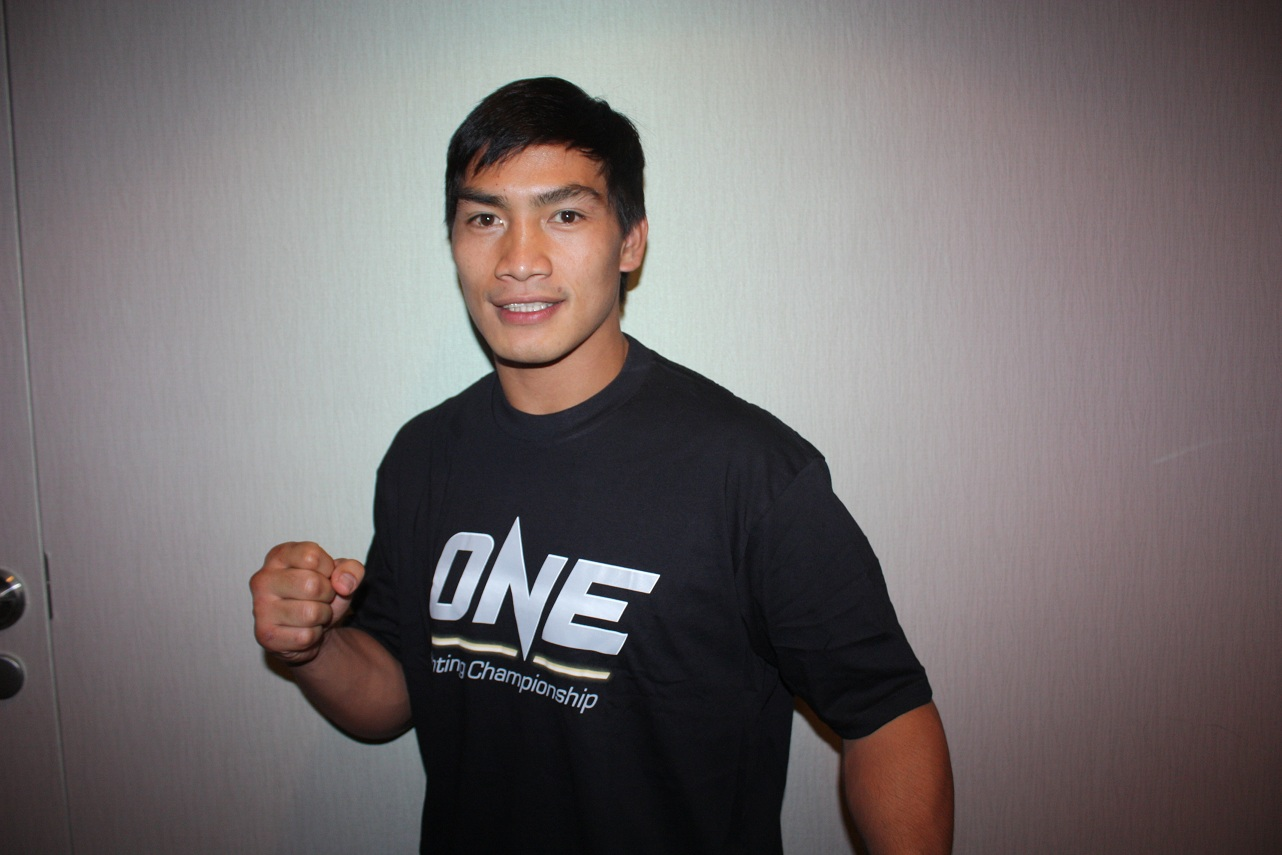
- Eduard Folayang in 2011
- Born: Eduard Ayangwa Folayang; November 22, 1983 (age 42); Baguio, Philippines
- Other names: The Landslide
- Height: 5 ft 8 in (1.73 m)
- Weight: 170 lb (77 kg)
- Division: Welterweight (2007–2009); Lightweight (2009–2023)
- Reach: 68 1/2 in (174 cm)
- Style: Sanda
- Stance: Orthodox
- Fighting out of: Baguio, Philippines
- Team: Team Lakay (2007–2023); Lions Nation MMA (2023–present)
- Rank: Black belt in Wushu; Blue belt in Brazilian Jiu Jitsu under Gibran Langbayan
- Years active: 2007–2023, 2025-present

Mixed martial arts record
- Total: 38
- Wins: 23
- By knockout: 7
- By submission: 2
- By decision: 14
- Losses: 15
- By knockout: 6
- By submission: 4
- By decision: 5

Other information
- Occupation: Professional Athlete
- University: University of the Cordilleras
- Spouse: Genevieve Aloy Folayang
- Mixed martial arts record from Sherdog
- Last updated on: March 31, 2019

Eduard Folayang
Medal record

Representing Philippines

Men's Wushu Sanda

World Championships
Bronze medal – third place	2005 Hanoi	70kg

Asian Games
Silver medal – second place	2006 Doha	70 kg
Bronze medal – third place	2002 Busan	65 kg

SEA Games
Gold medal – first place	2003 Ho Chi Minh City	70 kg
Gold medal – first place	2005 Bacolod City	70 kg
Gold medal – first place	2011 Jakarta	70 kg

Eduard Ayangwa Folayang (born November 22, 1983) is a Filipino professional mixed martial artist and wushu practitioner who competes in the Lightweight division of ONE Championship, where he is a two-time ONE Lightweight World Champion. He also competed for Universal Reality Combat Championship, where he is a former URCC Welterweight Champion.

Folayang was a member of Team Lakay Wushu in Baguio from 2007 until he left the gym on March 10, 2023, which has produced numerous Filipino champions in URCC and ONE Championship. The Baguio native made his first Martial Combat debut on June 17, 2010, defeating Slovak fighter Egon Racz via guillotine choke early in the first round.

Folayang has won several international Wushu tournaments, including a gold medal at the 2011 Southeast Asian Games which he won with a spinning back kick KO in the final, a silver medal in the 2006 Doha Asian Games, and bronze medals in both the 2005 World Wushu Championship and the 2002 Busan Asian Games.

== Biography ==
Folayang was born in Baguio on November 22, 1983. His parents are natives of Mountain Province and are of Igorot descent. He endured a very tough childhood with his family living in dire poverty for much of his youth. Folayang even lost five of his siblings due to a lack of access to healthcare.

Folayang started training wushu and boxing when he was 16 years old under the tutelage of head coach Tony Candelaria, who helped him to improve his skills and discipline.

Folayang graduated from the University of the Cordilleras in 2006, and passed his exam to become a teacher. He began teaching English and Physical Education, but six months in, decided to quit to pursue his dreams in martial arts.

After surviving his own impoverished childhood, Folayang now uses his status to promote and help other charities, including raising money for education for under-privileged Filipino children.

Folayang is a Christian.

== Mixed martial arts career ==
=== URCC/Gorilla Warfare ===
On June 30, 2007, Folayang made his professional debut in the Universal Reality Combat Championship (URCC), the biggest mixed martial arts promotion in the Philippines. The Baguio native fought undefeated welterweight champion Allan Co and defeated him by TKO in round 1. With the win, Folayang became the new title holder.

After 5 wins, Folayang suffered his first defeat at the hands of Guam's Jon Tuck via knockout in just 8 seconds on November 21, 2009. This was his second bout in the Gorilla Warfare promotion.

Despite having a contract with ONE FC, Folayang was allowed to return to the URCC to fight Brazilian Muay Thai champion Wadson Teixeira at URCC Cebu VII: Dominate on January 13, 2012. He won by submission due to elbows in the first round.

On December 1, 2012, Folayang returned in the promotion facing Lowen Tynanes. Eduard Folayang loss by a doctor stoppage due to a big cut delivered by Tynanes' elbow.

=== Martial Combat ===
Folayang entered the Singapore-based promotion Martial Combat in 2010. On June 17, the multi-titled wushu expert took on Slovakian fighter Egon Racz in the MC – Martial Combat 5 event. Folayang won the match via guillotine choke early in the first round.

On July 14, 2010, Folayang fought Mongolian Bao She Ri Gu Leng in a lightweight fight, with the latter's Superfight lightweight title at stake; the event was held at the Resorts World Sentosa in Singapore. The Filipino fighter won by unanimous decision after 5 round, to become the new champion.

On October 16, 2010, Folayang fought South African Muay Thai specialist Vuyisile Colossa at Martial Combat 12. Folayang won a decision after scoring multiple takedowns in the first two rounds even though Colossa dominated the third round.

=== ONE Championship ===
He was originally scheduled to make his ONE Championship debut against Muay Thai champion-turned MMA fighter Ole Laursen at ONE FC: Champion vs. Champion at the Singapore Indoor Stadium on September 3, 2011. Laursen, however, suffered a knee injury in training and was replaced by A Sol Kwon, a South Korean on a six fight winning streak. Folayang won the fight via unanimous decision.

A rescheduled bout with Ole Laursen took place on March 31, 2012. In a back-and-forth fight, Folayang lost via a controversial split decision, resulting to the crowd booing Laursen after the decision was announced.

On July 18, 2012, Folayang defeated Felipe Enomoto via unanimous decision at ONE FC: Pride of a Nation in Manila, Philippines. Right after the fight ONE FC President Victor Cui announced that Folayang will earn a shot for the first ever ONE FC lightweight belt on October at ONE FC: Rise of Kings against Zorobabel Moreira. Despite the announcement, Folayang had to pull out of the title fight due to URCC commitments. He was later replaced by former foe Ole Laursen who was again replaced by Kotetsu Boku who eventually became the first ever ONE FC Lightweight Champion. However, One FC officials mentioned that Folayang will retain his no.1 contender status and should face the eventual winner Boku.

On May 31, 2013, Folayang fought UFC and WEC veteran Kamal Shalorus at ONE FC 9: Rise to Power. He lost the fight via unanimous decision.

Coming from a two-fight losing skid, Folayang faced Dutch fighter Vincent Latoel on December 6, 2013, at ONE FC: Moment of Truth. The event took place at the SM Mall of Asia Arena in Pasay, Philippines. For the majority of the fight, Folayang used his takedowns and ground striking offense but was unable to finish his opponent, eventually winning by unanimous decision.

In his next fight, Folayang faced former ONE FC lightweight champion Kotetsu Boku on May 2, 2014, at ONE FC: Rise of Heroes. He won the bout by unanimous decision.

Folayang faced Russian fighter Timofey Nastyukhin on December 5, 2014, at ONE FC 23: Warrior's Way. Despite entering the fight as a favorite, Folayang lost the fight via KO in the first round after being dropped by a flying knee and then finished by Nastyukhin's soccer kicks.

==== ONE Lightweight Champion ====
After picking up two consecutive wins in 2016, Folayang faced Shinya Aoki for the ONE Championship Lightweight title at ONE Championship: Defending Honor on November 11, 2016, in Singapore. Folayang won the bout and the title via TKO in the third round.

On April 21, 2017, Folayang successfully defended his title against Ev Ting at ONE 54: Kings of Destiny. On November 10, 2017, Folayang lost the lightweight title at ONE 61: Legends of the World to Martin Nguyen via second-round KO, Nguyen would then vacate the title due to injury.

After losing his title, Folayang picked up a couple of wins against Kharun Atlangeriev and Aziz Pahrudinov in 2018 and was given a chance to reclaim the belt at ONE Championship: Conquest of Champions on November 23, 2018, against Singaporean knockout artist Amir Khan. Folayang recaptured the lightweight title by defeating Khan via unanimous decision.

On March 31, 2019, Folayang lost the lightweight title again in a rematch with Shinya Aoki at ONE Championship: A New Era via technical submission.

==== Post-title reign ====
Folayang's next fight was at ONE Championship: Dawn of Heroes on August 2, 2019. He faced former UFC and Bellator lightweight champion Eddie Alvarez. Folayang lost the fight via submission in the first round.

Folayang next faced Amarsanaa Tsogookhuu at ONE Championship: Masters Of Fate on November 8, 2019. After dominating early in the fight with his kicks, an accidental clash of heads in the second round cut Folayang open and rendered him unable to continue. The fight would go to a technical decision and Eduard Folayang won by unanimous decision.

Afterwards, Folayang was originally scheduled to face Ahmed Mujtaba at ONE Championship: Fire & Fury. However, Mujtaba would later be replaced by Pieter Buist. On January 31, 2020, Folayang lost to Buist by split decision.

Folayang faced Antonio Caruso at ONE Championship: Inside the Matrix on October 30, 2020. He lost the fight via unanimous decision.

Folayang was to make a comeback on April 28, 2021, against former UFC middleweight contender Yoshihiro Akiyama at ONE on TNT 4. However, he was rescheduled instead to have a trilogy match against Shinya Aoki after Akiyama pulled out due to suffering an injury during training camp. He lost the bout in the first round via armbar.

Folayang faced Zhang Lipeng at ONE Championship: Battleground 2 on August 13, 2021. He lost the bout via unanimous decision.

Folayang made his ONE Super Series debut against John Wayne Parr under Muay Thai rules at ONE: X on March 26, 2022. He won the bout via unanimous decision.

Folayang faced Edson Marques on December 3, 2022, at ONE on Prime Video 5. He lost the fight via technical knockout in the second round.

Folayang faced Amir Khan in a rematch on September 30, 2023, at ONE Fight Night 14. He won the fight via knockout in the third round, snapping a five-fight losing streak.

Folayang faced Shinya Aoki in a tetralogy bout on March 23, 2025, at ONE 172. He lost the fight via armbar in round one.

==== Departure from Team Lakay & Lions Nation MMA ====
Folayang left Team Lakay Wushu, his longtime training camp in Baguio City, on March 10, 2023, due to undisclosed reasons. On June 24, 2023, it was announced that Folayang had formed his own team, Lions Nation MMA, with fellow ex-Team Lakay members Kevin Belingon, Joshua Pacio, Danny Kingad, Jeremy Pacatiw, Stephen Loman and Honorio Banario.

== Championships and accomplishments ==
=== Mixed martial arts ===
- Martial Combat
  - Martial Combat Superfight Lightweight Championship (One time)
- ONE Championship
  - ONE Lightweight World Championship (Two time) vs. Shinya Aoki and Amir Khan
  - (First reign) One successful title defense vs. Ev Ting
  - Fight of the Night (Three times) vs. A Sol Kwon, Ole Laursen and Ev Ting
  - Most fights in ONE Championship (23)
- Universal Reality Combat Championship
  - URCC Welterweight Championship (One time)
  - Three successful title defenses
- Other
  - #1 Pound for Pound MMA fighter in the Philippines

=== Wushu ===
- 2002 Asian Games – Bronze medal
- 2005 World Wushu Championships – Bronze medal
- 2006 Asian Games – Silver medal
- 2003 SEA Games – Gold Medal
- 2005 SEA Games – Gold Medal
- 2011 SEA Games – Gold Medal

== Mixed martial arts record ==
Professional record breakdown
38 matches	23 wins	15 losses
By knockout	7	6
By submission	2	4
By decision	14	5

Res.	Record	Opponent	Method	Event	Date	Round	Time	Location	Notes
Loss	23–15	Shozo Isojima	TKO (punches)	ONE: The Inner Circle 21	July 10, 2026	1	4:29	Bangkok, Thailand	
Loss	23–14	Shinya Aoki	Submission (armbar)	ONE 172	March 23, 2025	1	0:53	Saitama, Japan	
Win	23–13	Amir Khan	KO (punch)	ONE Fight Night 14	September 30, 2023	3	1:57	Kallang, Singapore	
Loss	22–13	Edson Marques	TKO (punches)	ONE on Prime Video 5	December 3, 2022	2	2:53	Pasay, Philippines	
Loss	22–12	Zhang Lipeng	Decision (unanimous)	ONE: Battleground 2	August 13, 2021	3	5:00	Kallang, Singapore	
Loss	22–11	Shinya Aoki	Submission (armbar)	ONE on TNT 4	April 28, 2021	1	4:20	Kallang, Singapore	
Loss	22–10	Antonio Caruso	Decision (unanimous)	ONE: Inside the Matrix	October 30, 2020	3	5:00	Kallang, Singapore	
Loss	22–9	Pieter Buist	Decision (split)	ONE: Fire & Fury	January 31, 2020	3	5:00	Pasay, Philippines	
Win	22–8	Amarsanaa Tsogookhuu	Technical Decision (unanimous)	ONE: Masters of Fate	November 8, 2019	2	2:31	Pasay, Philippines	An inadvertent headbutt rendered Folayang unable to continue.
Loss	21–8	Eddie Alvarez	Submission (rear-naked choke)	ONE: Dawn of Heroes	August 2, 2019	1	2:16	Pasay, Philippines	ONE Lightweight World Grand Prix Semifinal.
Loss	21–7	Shinya Aoki	Technical Submission (arm-triangle choke)	ONE: A New Era	March 31, 2019	1	2:34	Tokyo, Japan	Lost the ONE Lightweight Championship (170 lb).
Win	21–6	Amir Khan	Decision (unanimous)	ONE: Conquest of Champions	Nov 23, 2018	5	5:00	Pasay, Philippines	Won the vacant ONE Lightweight Championship (170 lb).
Win	20–6	Aziz Pahrudinov	Decision (unanimous)	ONE: Reign of Kings	July 27, 2018	3	5:00	Pasay, Philippines	
Win	19–6	Kharun Atlangeriev	Decision (unanimous)	ONE: Unstoppable Dreams	May 18, 2018	3	5:00	Kallang, Singapore	Return to Welterweight.
Loss	18–6	Martin Nguyen	KO (punch)	ONE: Legends of the World	November 10, 2017	2	2:20	Manila, Philippines	Lost the ONE Lightweight Championship.
Win	18–5	Ev Ting	Decision (unanimous)	ONE: Kings of Destiny	April 21, 2017	5	5:00	Pasay, Philippines	Defended the ONE Lightweight Championship. Fight of the Night.
Win	17–5	Shinya Aoki	TKO (knees and punches)	ONE: Defending Honor	November 11, 2016	3	0:41	Kallang, Singapore	Won the ONE Lightweight Championship.
Win	16–5	Adrian Pang	Decision (unanimous)	ONE: Heroes of the World	August 13, 2016	3	5:00	Macau, SAR, China	
Win	15–5	Tetsuya Yamada	Decision (unanimous)	ONE: Clash of Heroes	January 29, 2016	3	5:00	Kuala Lumpur, Malaysia	
Loss	14–5	Timofey Nastyukhin	KO (flying knee and soccer kicks)	ONE FC: Warrior's Way	December 5, 2014	1	3:11	Pasay, Philippines	
Win	14–4	Kotetsu Boku	Decision (unanimous)	ONE FC: Rise of Heroes	May 2, 2014	3	5:00	Pasay, Philippines	
Win	13–4	Vincent Latoel	Decision (unanimous)	ONE FC: Moment of Truth	December 6, 2013	3	5:00	Pasay, Philippines	
Loss	12–4	Kamal Shalorus	Decision (unanimous)	ONE FC: Rise to Power	May 31, 2013	3	5:00	Pasay, Philippines	
Loss	12–3	Lowen Tynanes	TKO (doctor stoppage)	URCC 22	December 1, 2012	1	6:22	Pasay, Philippines	For the URCC Lightweight Championship.
Win	12–2	Felipe Enomoto	Decision (unanimous)	ONE FC: Pride of a Nation	August 31, 2012	3	5:00	Quezon City, Philippines	
Loss	11–2	Ole Laursen	Decision (split)	ONE FC: War of the Lions	March 31, 2012	3	5:00	Kallang, Singapore	Fight of the Night.
Win	11–1	Wadson Teixeira	TKO (submission to elbows)	URCC Cebu 7	January 13, 2012	1	0:56	Cebu City, Philippines	Defended the URCC Welterweight Championship
Win	10–1	Kwon A-sol	Decision (unanimous)	ONE FC: Champion vs. Champion	September 3, 2011	3	5:00	Kallang, Singapore	Fight of the Night.
Win	9–1	Vuyisile Colossa	Decision (unanimous)	Martial Combat 12	Oct 16, 2010	3	5:00	Sentosa, Singapore	
Win	8–1	Baosheriguleng	Decision (unanimous)	Martial Combat 5	Jul 14, 2010	5	5:00	Sentosa, Singapore	Won the Martial Combat Lightweight Championship.
Win	7–1	Egon Racz	Submission (guillotine choke)	Martial Combat 4	Jun 17, 2010	1	4:40	Sentosa, Singapore	
Win	6–1	Jung Doo-jae	TKO (punches)	URCC 16	Mar 27, 2010	1	3:15	Makati, Philippines	Defended the URCC Welterweight Championship
Loss	5–1	Jon Tuck	KO (punches)	Gorilla Warfare 3	Nov 21, 2009	1	0:08	Saipan, Northern Mariana Islands	Lightweight debut.
Win	5–0	A.J. Aguon	Decision (unanimous)	URCC 14	Jul 18, 2009	2	10:00	Makati, Philippines	
Win	4–0	Jerome Norita	TKO (punches)	Gorilla Warfare 2	Mar 28, 2009	1	0:52	Saipan, Northern Mariana Islands	
Win	3–0	Jerry Legaspi	TKO (punches and kicks to the body)	URCC 13	Nov 22, 2008	1	0:15	Makati, Philippines	Defended the URCC Welterweight Championship
Win	2–0	Caloy Baduria	TKO (punches)	URCC 12	May 7, 2008	1	3:41	Makati, Philippines	
Win	1–0	Allan Co	TKO (punches)	URCC 10	Jun 30, 2007	1	7:24	Taguig, Philippines	Welterweight debut. Won the inaugural URCC Welterweight Championship.

== Muay Thai record ==
Professional kickboxing record
1 Wins (0 KOs), 0 losses, 0 draw
Date	Result	Opponent	Event	Location	Method	Round	Time
2022-03-26	Win	(Australia) John Wayne Parr	ONE: X	Kallang, Singapore	Decision (unanimous)	3	3:00
