= Cebu International Convention Center =

Convention center in Mandaue, Philippines

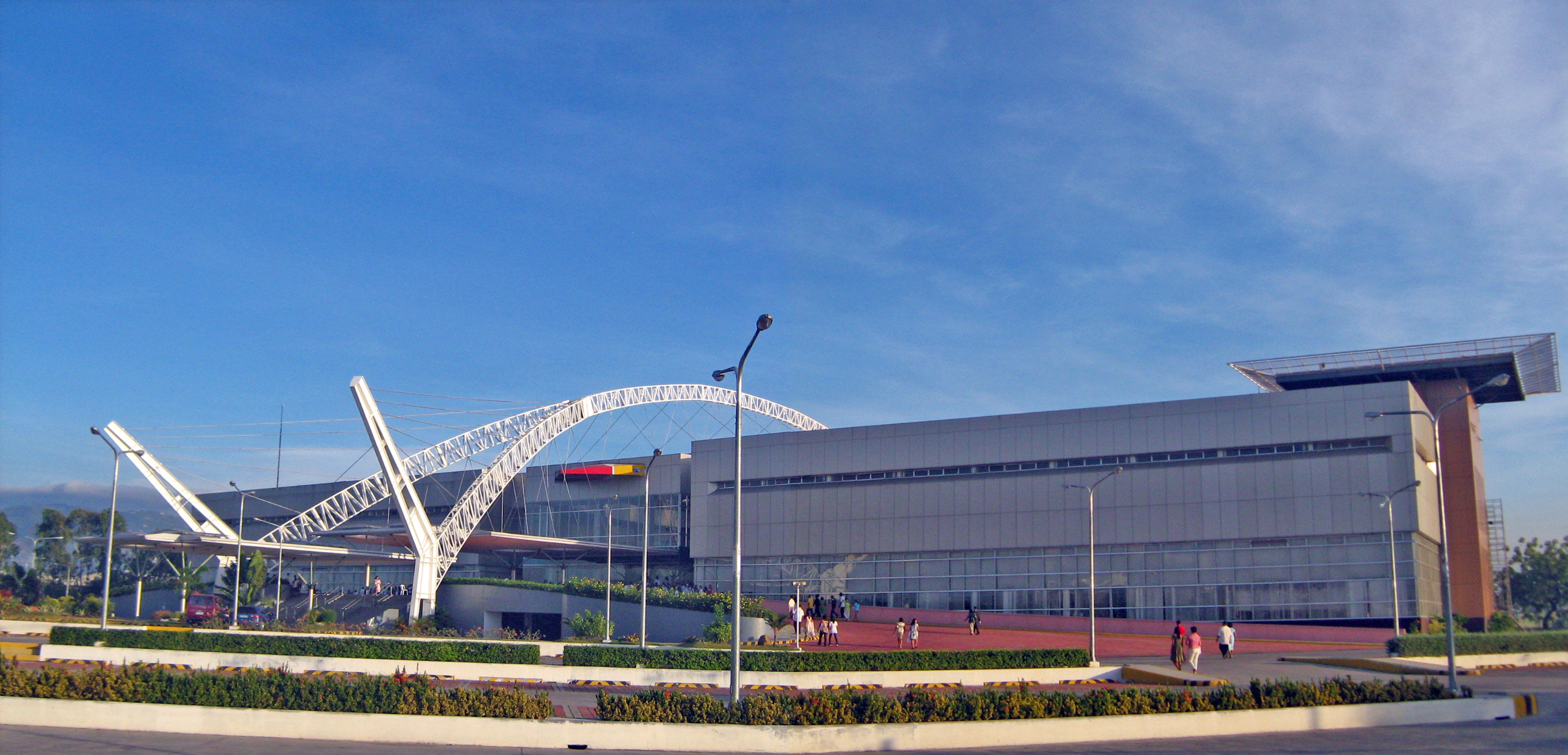
- Interactive map of the Cebu International Convention Center area

General information
- Status: In severe disrepair
- Type: Convention center
- Location: Mandaue, Cebu, Philippines
- Coordinates: 10°19′35.03″N 123°56′9.25″E
- Completed: 2006
- Owner: Provincial Government of Cebu

Technical details
- Floor count: 3
- Floor area: 28,000 m^{2} (300,000 sq ft)

Design and construction
- Architect: Manuel Guanzon
- Main contractor: WT Construction, Inc. (WTCI)

Other information
- Public transit: 20A 21A 22A 22D Mandaue

The Cebu International Convention Center (CICC) is a three-story convention center built by the Cebu Provincial Government for the 12th Asean Summit and 2nd East Asia Summit at a cost of about US$10 million. (Note: Various sources claim that CICC was built at a cost of ₱830 million, ₱840 million, or ₱800 million in 2006.) It is situated on 3.8 hectares (410,000 sq ft) of land at the Mandaue City Reclamation Area in Metro Cebu, Philippines and has a gross floor area of 28,000 square metres (300,000 sq ft).

== Development ==
The site where the convention center now stands was originally intended for a sports complex to have been dubbed as the "Cebu Mega Dome". A contest was held for its design and the winning entry was the "spinning disc" by architect Alexus Medalla. The project, however, was stalled after some members of the provincial board opposed it.

Construction of the convention center broke ground on April 7, 2006, in the 485th Celebration Day of Mandaue. The Cebu provincial government set the construction deadline on November 15, but was not accomplished. The provincial government of Cebu handed over the CICC to the national organizing committee for the ASEAN Summit in after completion of construction in December 2006.

The allocated budget for the CICC in May 2006 was around ₱250 million. The budget has increased to ₱515 million, then ₱800 million.

In late 2005, Philippine President Gloria Macapagal Arroyo decided that the province would host the 12th ASEAN Summit and 2nd East Asia Summit in December 2006, which was later moved to January 12–15, 2007, due to Typhoon Utor. The Philippines was supposed to host the twin summits in December 2007. However, Myanmar, the original host for 2006, backed out. Since the province lacked a stand-alone convention center with complete facilities for a large and prestigious international gathering like the ASEAN Summit, Cebu Governor Gwendolyn Garcia revived the "mega dome" project but with the design revised as a convention center instead of a sports arena. The external structure would still be that of a "spinning disc".

A few weeks afterwards a new design was put forwards and was considered, since it was cheaper and easier to build (and smaller), and as there was a time constraint that the Cebu Provincial Government had to stick to. Construction for the substructure began in April 2006 and work on the superstructure itself, which was largely made up of structural steel, glass and aluminum cladding, began three months later. The center was finished four months later in late November and was officially inaugurated on January 6, 2007.

== Closing ==
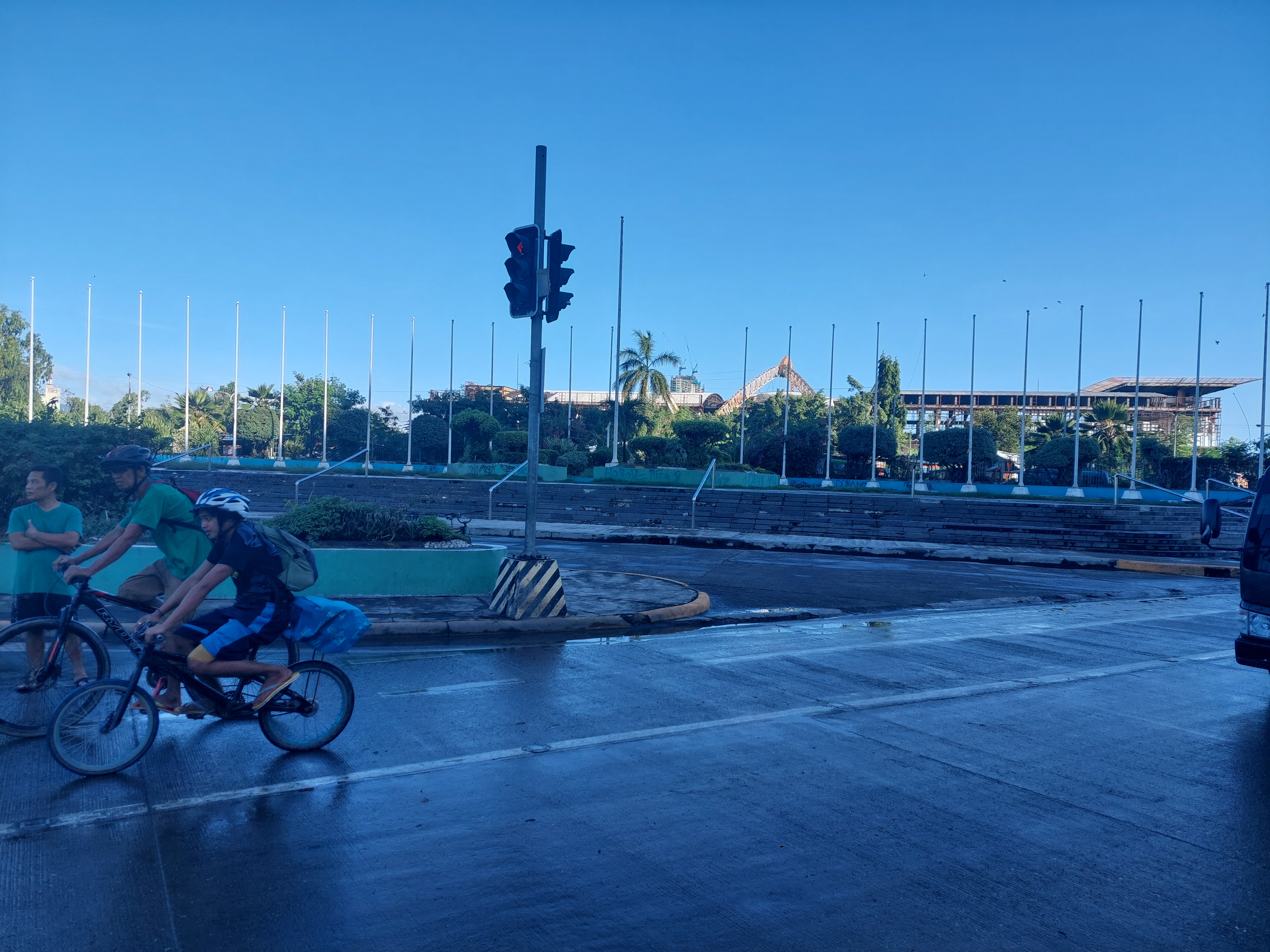
The current state of the Cebu International Convention Center as of 2023

The building has been closed since the October 2013 Bohol earthquake, having suffered major damage. It was further damaged by neglect and the wrath of both Typhoon Yolanda (Haiyan) in 2013, a month after the Bohol earthquake as well as Typhoon Odette (Rai) in 2021. Since then, the ramshackle building has fallen into a state of severe disrepair and is used as an evacuation center for victims of several fires in nearby barangays. Shacks were built within the area of the building that was once the parking lot.

A 2023 Commission on Audit (COA) report noted that several parts of the building were stolen, which indicated a loss of government property.

Demolition of makeshift houses and relocation of informal settlers at the CICC began in July 2024 for the groundbreaking of a new city hall in Mandaue.

== Acquisition by the Mandaue City Government ==
The outskirts of the CICC premises as of January, 2026

The facility is owned by the Provincial Government of Cebu. In October 2016, it was announced that the City Government of Mandaue would acquire the CICC. The city government was to pay the provincial government every year from 2016 to 2019. The four payments would amount to about ₱350 million. Upon the first payment by the city government, the convention center was scheduled to be transferred to the city government. The acquisition cost was fully paid in August 2018 for ₱300 million. A 2019 report by the COA noted that the sale did not have prior COA approval and public bidding.

The Mandaue City government broke ground for the construction of a government center on August 29, 2024, situated in front of the CICC. The local government stated plans of renovating the CICC through a public-private partnership.

== Facilities ==
The convention center features an International Media Center, a large Plenary Hall, an Exhibition Hall and several meeting rooms.

== Photos ==
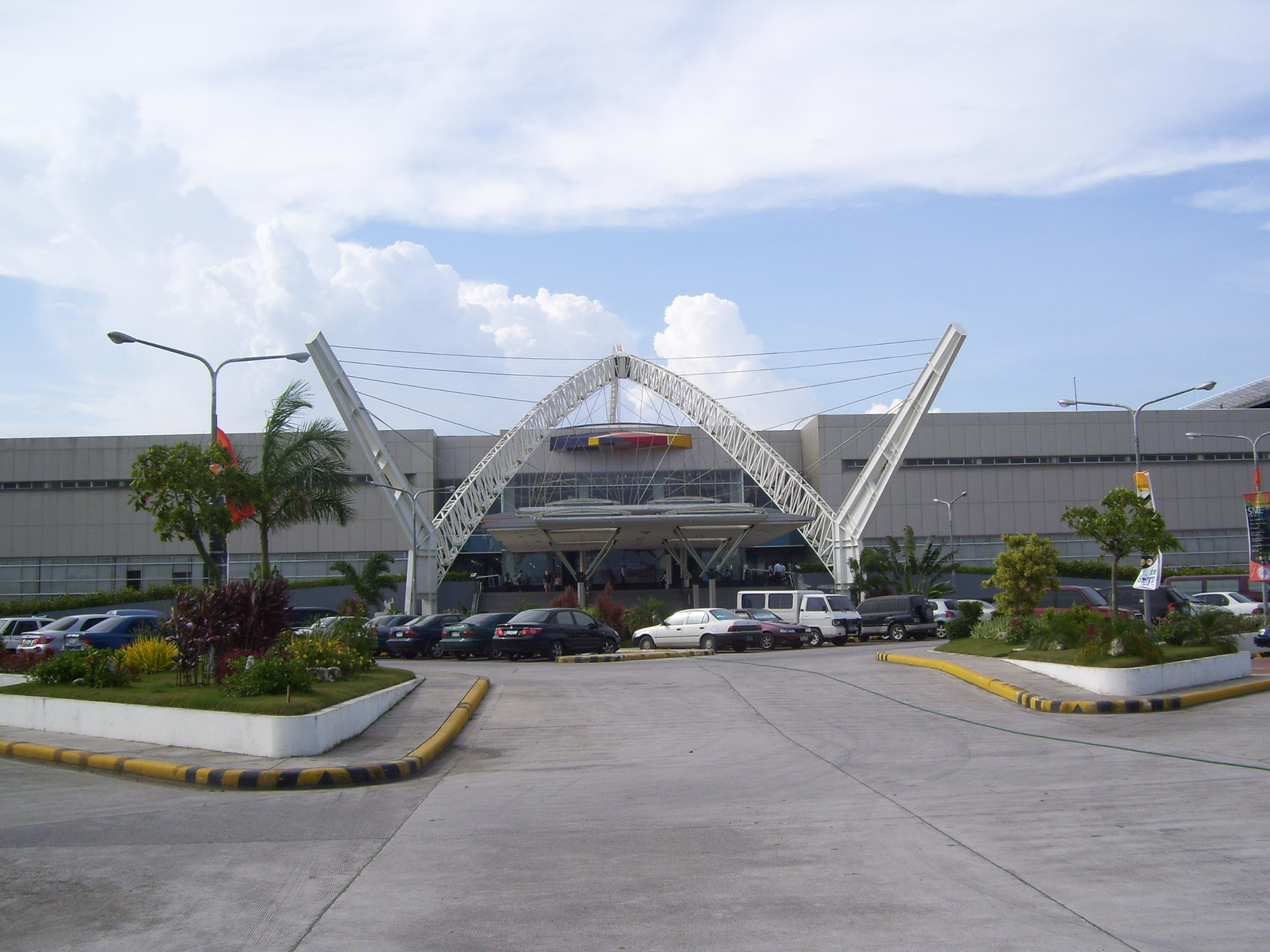
Outer view of the building

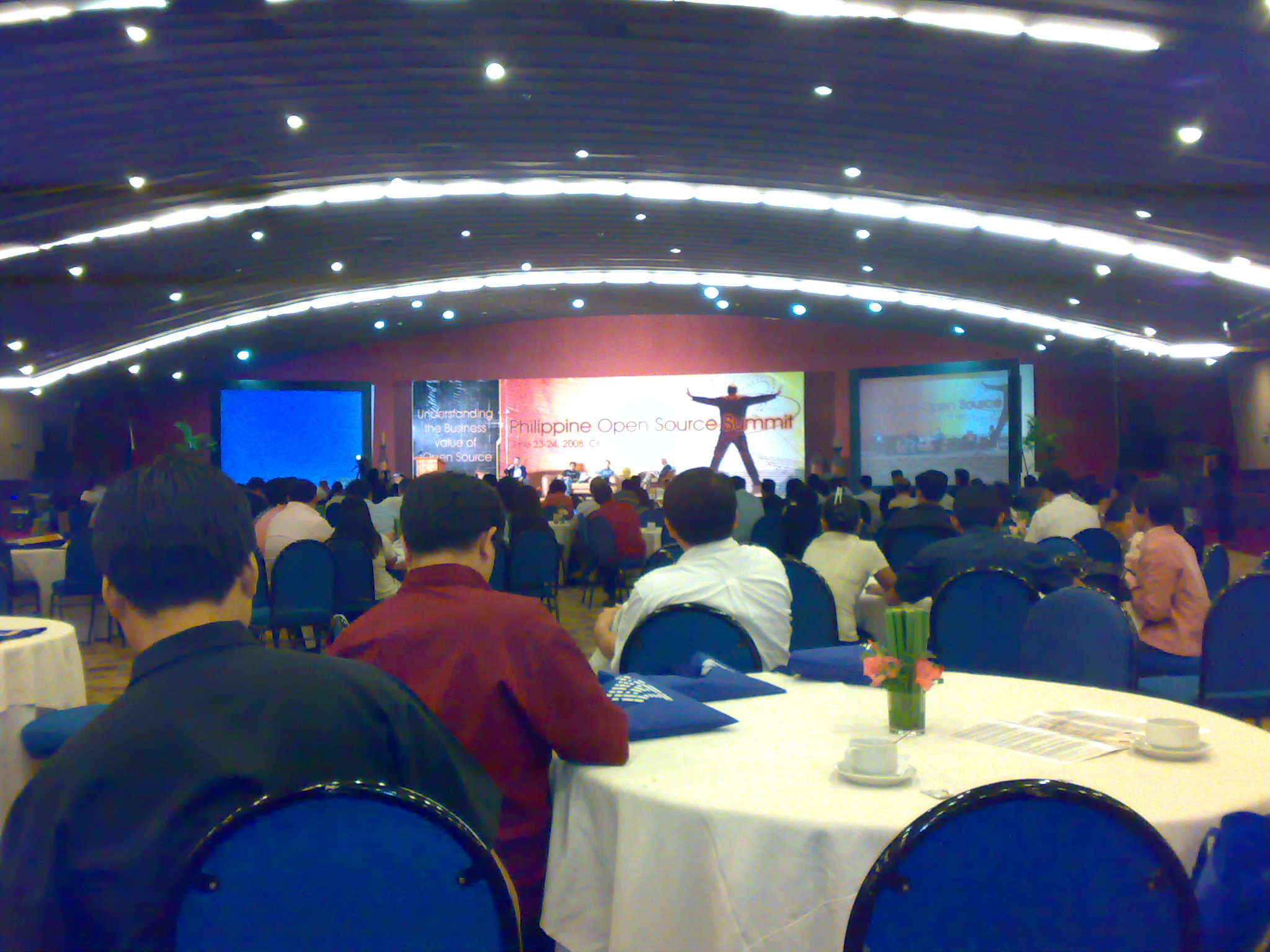
Plenary Hall at the second floor

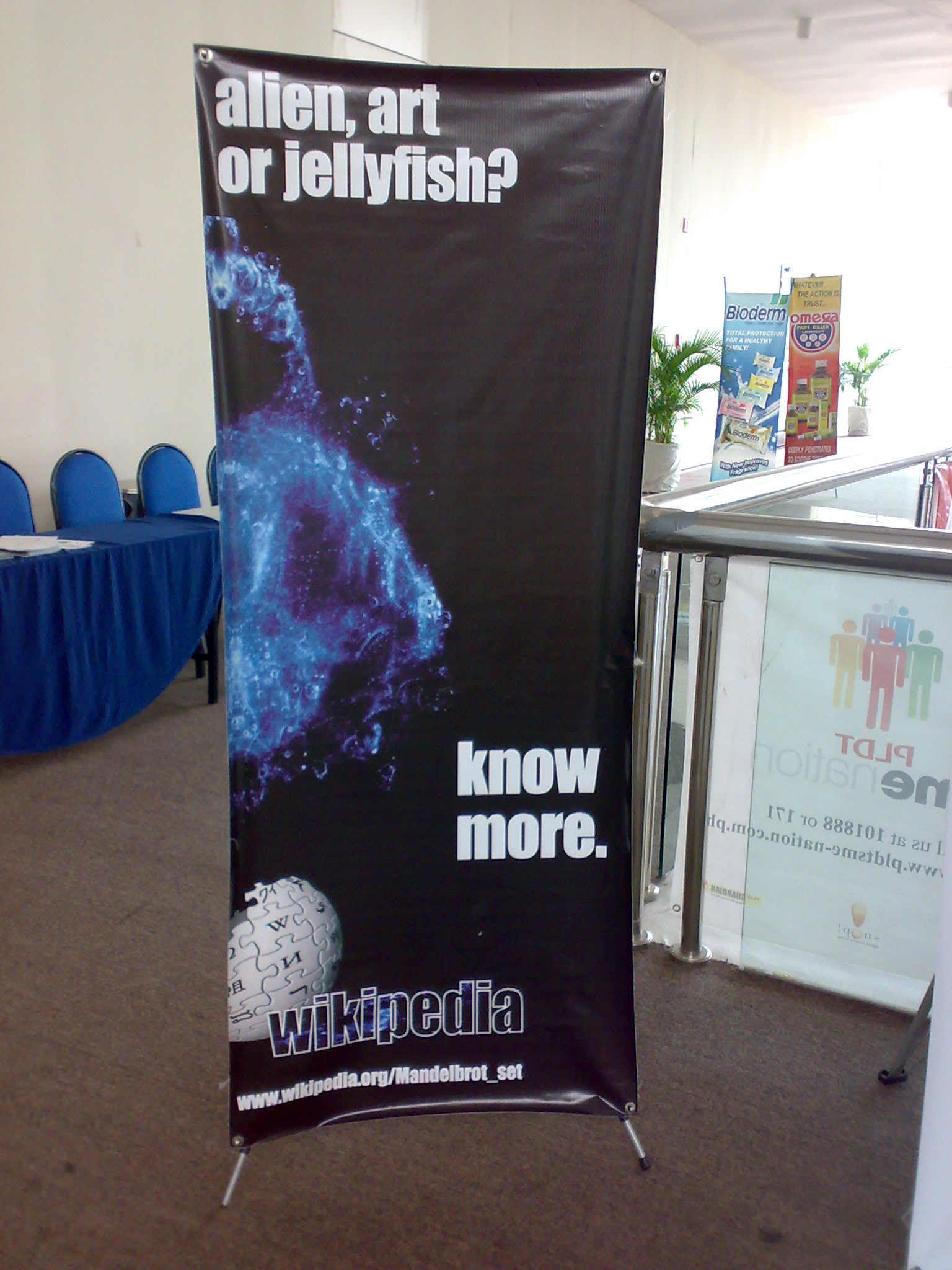
Session Hall

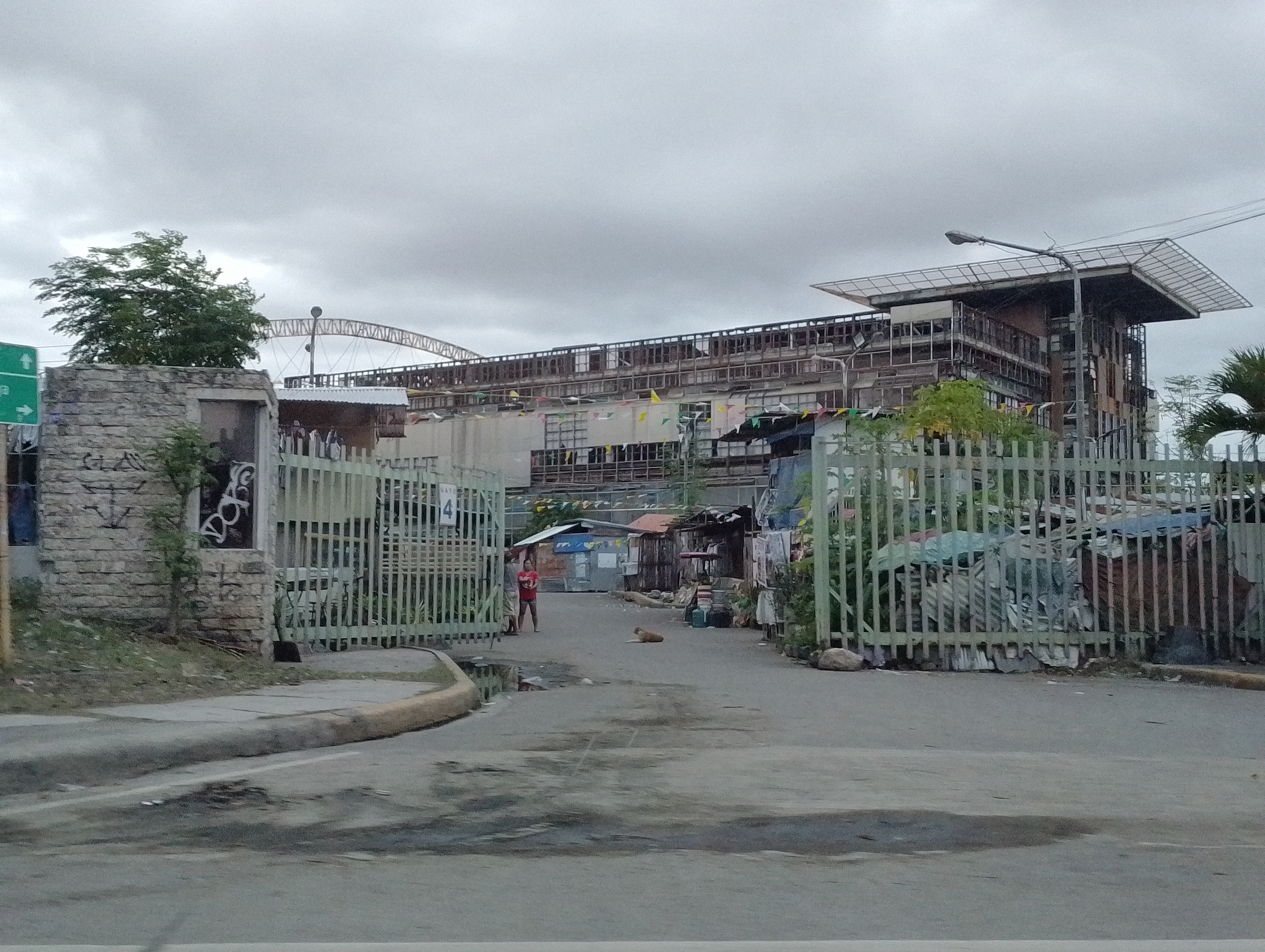
Damage pictured in 2023, almost two years after Typhoon Odette further ravaged the already-disused building
