= Zhang Tiequan =

Chinese mixed martial artist

- Born: July 25, 1978 (age 48); Inner Mongolia, China
- Native name: 张铁泉
- Other names: The Wolf
- Height: 5 ft 8 in (1.73 m)
- Weight: 155 lb (70 kg; 11.1 st)
- Division: Welterweight; Lightweight; Featherweight
- Reach: 69.0 in (175 cm)
- Fighting out of: Beijing, China PR
- Team: Black Tiger Team; China Top Team
- Trainer: Zhao Xuejun
- Rank: Black belt in Brazilian Jiu-Jitsu; Black sash in Sanshou; Master of Sports in Sanshou; Master of Sports in Mongolian wrestling
- Years active: 2005–2012

Mixed martial arts record
- Total: 19
- Wins: 15
- By knockout: 3
- By submission: 12
- Losses: 4
- By knockout: 1
- By decision: 3

Other information
- Notable students: Li Jingliang
- Mixed martial arts record from Sherdog
- Last updated on: November 10, 2012

Zhang Tiequan, or Zhang Tie Quan (Chinese: 张铁泉; pinyin: Zhāng Tiěquán, born July 25, 1978), often anglicized to Tiequan Zhang, is a Chinese mixed martial artist, who last competed as a Lightweight in the UFC. A professional competitor since 2005, Tiequan spent most of the beginning of his career fighting in the Art of War Fighting Championship in his native China, until he signed with WEC in the United States. He is notable for being the first fighter from China to be signed to the UFC and the first to win a bout with the promotion.

== Background ==
Zhang began training in martial arts and Mongolian wrestling as a child and won the Inner Mongolian Wrestling Championships at the age of 16. After this, he was recruited to fight at one of China's top Sanshou academies where he was under the tutelage of Sanda coach, Zhao Xuejun. In 2005, Zhao convinced Zhang to move to MMA making him one of the earliest professional MMA fighters in China.

Zhang is also China's first-ever brown belt and black belt in Brazilian jiu-jitsu.

== Mixed martial arts career ==
=== Early career ===
When the Art of War Fighting Championship, China's largest mixed martial arts organization, was founded in 2005, the company's founder Andy Pi invited a number of fighters from Zhang's academy to fight there. Zhang then took up mixed martial arts and won his first thirteen fights, over a five-year period, all by knockout or submission.

=== World Extreme Cagefighting ===
In August 2010, Zhang joined World Extreme Cagefighting, one of the largest mixed martial arts organizations in North America. He was expected to make his WEC debut against Alex Karalexis at WEC 51: Aldo vs. Gamburyan in September 2010. However, Karalexis was forced from the bout with an injury and replaced by promotional newcomer Jason Reinhardt. Reinhardt was then also forced from the card after failing a prefight eye exam and replaced by Pablo Garza. Zhang won the fight via submission in the first round.

Zhang then fought Danny Downes on December 16, 2010 at WEC 53: Henderson vs Pettis, the WEC's last ever event before merging with the Ultimate Fighting Championship. Zhang tasted defeat for the first time, losing via unanimous decision (29-28, 30-27, 29-28).

=== Ultimate Fighting Championship ===
On October 28, 2010, WEC merged with the UFC. As part of the merger, all WEC fighters were transferred to the UFC.

For his UFC debut, Zhang dropped down to Featherweight and faced Jason Reinhardt on February 27, 2011 at UFC 127: Penn vs. Fitch. Zhang showed accurate counters in the first few moments of the fight before eventually attempting a guillotine choke which led to a submission victory just 48 seconds into the first round.

Zhang fought Darren Elkins on October 8, 2011 at UFC 136, and lost the fight via unanimous decision (30-27, 30-27, 30-26). Zhang repeatedly attempted unsuccessful guillotine chokes which left him on his back where he was unable to scramble and received punches and elbows for the majority of the bout.

Zhang was expected to face Leonard Garcia on February 26, 2012 at UFC 144. However, Garcia was forced out of the bout with an injury and replaced by promotional newcomer Issei Tamura. He lost the fight via KO in the second round.

Zhang returned to Lightweight is expected to face Jon Tuck in Macau on November 10, 2012 at UFC on Fuel TV 6. He lost via unanimous decision in a back-and-forth fight.

==== The Ultimate Fighter: China ====
In November 2013, it was announced that Zhang would serve as one of the coaches on The Ultimate Fighter: China, the China-based version of The Ultimate Fighter which began airing in December 2013.

== Mixed martial arts record ==
Professional record breakdown
| 19 matches | 15 wins | 4 losses |
| By knockout | 3 | 1 |
| By submission | 12 | 0 |
| By decision | 0 | 3 |

| Res. | Record | Opponent | Method | Event | Date | Round | Time | Location | Notes |
|---|---|---|---|---|---|---|---|---|---|
| Loss | 15–4 | Jon Tuck | Decision (unanimous) | UFC on Fuel TV: Franklin vs. Le | November 10, 2012 | 3 | 5:00 | Macau, SAR, China | Return to Lightweight. |
| Loss | 15–3 | Issei Tamura | KO (punch) | UFC 144 | February 26, 2012 | 2 | 0:32 | Saitama, Japan | |
| Loss | 15–2 | Darren Elkins | Decision (unanimous) | UFC 136 | October 8, 2011 | 3 | 5:00 | Houston, Texas, United States | |
| Win | 15–1 | Jason Reinhardt | Submission (guillotine choke) | UFC 127 | February 27, 2011 | 1 | 0:48 | Sydney, Australia | Featherweight debut. |
| Loss | 14–1 | Danny Downes | Decision (unanimous) | WEC 53 | December 16, 2010 | 3 | 5:00 | Glendale, Arizona, United States | |
| Win | 14–0 | Pablo Garza | Submission (guillotine choke) | WEC 51 | September 30, 2010 | 1 | 2:26 | Broomfield, Colorado, United States | |
| Win | 13–0 | Daniel Digby | Submission (neck crank) | Legend Fighting Championship 2 | June 24, 2010 | 1 | 0:30 | Kowloon Bay, Hong Kong | Welterweight bout. |
| Win | 12–0 | Caloy Baduria | Submission (armbar) | URCC 15: Onslaught | November 21, 2009 | 1 | 4:21 | Pasay, Philippines | |
| Win | 11–0 | Yonglong Zhu | Submission (kimura) | Ultimate Martial Arts Combat | April 18, 2009 | 1 | 1:06 | Beijing, China | |
| Win | 10–0 | Arthit Hanchana | Submission (triangle choke) | Xian Sports University: Ultimate Wrestle | January 10, 2009 | 2 | 2:46 | Guangzhou, China | |
| Win | 9–0 | Caloy Baduria | Submission (guillotine choke) | URCC 13: Indestructible | November 22, 2008 | 1 | 3:03 | Makati, Philippines | |
| Win | 8–0 | Malik Arash Mawlayi | Submission (punches) | AOW 10: Final Conflict | December 23, 2007 | 1 | 8:48 | Beijing, China | |
| Win | 7–0 | Erik Kalseth | Submission (ankle lock) | AOW 9: Fists of Fury | November 24, 2007 | 1 | 0:49 | Beijing, China | |
| Win | 6–0 | Seong Hee Kim | Submission (triangle choke) | AOW 8: Worlds Collide | September 22, 2007 | 1 | 1:39 | Beijing, China | |
| Win | 5–0 | Shashi Sathe | TKO (punches) | Art of War 6 | May 26, 2007 | 1 | 3:57 | Beijing, China | |
| Win | 4–0 | De Gi Ji Ri Hu | KO (punch) | Art of War 5 | March 31, 2007 | 1 | 1:04 | Beijing, China | |
| Win | 3–0 | Yun Tao Gong | Submission (rear-naked choke) | Art of War 4 | December 22, 2006 | 1 | 0:59 | Beijing, China | |
| Win | 2–0 | Salvador Domasian | TKO (punches) | URCC 7: The Art of War | December 10, 2005 | 1 | 4:48 | Quezon City, Philippines | |
| Win | 1–0 | Zhao Yun Fei | Submission (choke) | Art of War 1 | November 6, 2005 | N/A | N/A | Beijing, China | |

== See also ==
- List of current UFC fighters
- List of male mixed martial artists
