= 2014 in ONE Championship =

Mixed martial arts events

Information
- First date: March 14, 2014

Events
- Total events: 11

Fights
- Total fights: 104
- Title fights: 8

Chronology
2013 in ONE	2014 in ONE Championship	2015 in ONE

The year 2014 was the 4th year in the history of the ONE Championship, a mixed martial arts promotion based in Singapore.

== Tournament bracket ==
=== Cambodia Featherweight Grand Prix ===
==== ONE Cambodia Featherweight Grand Prix bracket ====
Semi-finals
(Cambodia) Chan Rothana	TKO
(Cambodia) Prak Chansin	1r.
(Cambodia) Samang Dun	TKO
(Cambodia) Chin Heng	1r.

Final
(Cambodia) Chan Rothana	1r.
(Cambodia) Samang Dun	DQ

=== Beijing Featherweight Tournament ===
==== ONE Beijing Featherweight Tournament bracket ====
Semi-finals
(China) Li Kai Wen	TKO
(China) He Nannan	1r.
(China) Wang Ya Wei	TKO
(China) Li Gen	1r.

Final
(China) Li Kai Wen	UD
(China) Wang Ya Wei	3r.

=== Beijing Flyweight Tournament ===
==== ONE Beijing Flyweight Tournament bracket ====
Semi-finals
(China) Wei Bin Li	SUB
(China) Jie Hao Yi	1r.
(China) Wang Wei	UD
(China) Liu Xu	3r.

Final
(China) Wei Bin Li	UD
(China) Wang Wei	3r.

== List of events ==
ONE Championship
No.	Event	Date	Venue	Location
1	ONE Fighting Championship: War of Nations	March 14, 2014	Stadium Negara	Kuala Lumpur, Malaysia
2	ONE Fighting Championship: Rise of Heroes	May 2, 2014	SM Mall of Asia Arena	Pasay, Philippines
3	ONE Fighting Championship: Honor and Glory	May 30, 2014	Singapore Indoor Stadium	Kallang, Singapore
4	ONE Fighting Championship: Era of Champions	June 14, 2014	Mata Elang International Stadium	Jakarta, Indonesia
5	ONE Fighting Championship: War of Dragons	July 11, 2014	NTU Sports Center	Taipei, Taiwan
6	ONE Fighting Championship: Reign of Champions	August 29, 2014	World Trade Centre	Dubai, United Arab Emirates
7	ONE Fighting Championship: Rise of the Kingdom	September 12, 2014	Koh Pich Theatre	Phnom Penh, Cambodia
8	ONE Fighting Championship: Roar of the Tigers	October 17, 2014	Putra Indoor Stadium	Kuala Lumpur, Malaysia
9	ONE Fighting Championship: Battle of the Lions	November 7, 2014	Singapore Indoor Stadium	Kallang, Singapore
10	ONE Fighting Championship: Warrior's Way	December 5, 2014	SM Mall of Asia Arena	Pasay, Philippines
11	ONE Fighting Championship: Dynasty of Champions (Beijing)	December 19, 2014	The Gymnasium Of National Olympic Sports Centre	Beijing, China

== ONE Fighting Championship: War of Nations ==
ONE Fighting Championship: War of Nations
- Promotion: ONE Fighting Championship
- Date: March 14, 2014
- Venue: Stadium Negara
- City: Kuala Lumpur, Malaysia
- Attendance: 8,700

Event chronology
ONE Fighting Championship: Moment of Truth	ONE Fighting Championship: War of Nations	ONE Fighting Championship: Rise of Heroes

ONE Fighting Championship: War of Nations (also known as ONE FC 14) was a mixed martial arts event held by ONE Championship. The event took take place on March 14, 2014 at the Stadium Negara in Kuala Lumpur, Malaysia

Background

The event was the fourth visit of ONE to Malaysia, and the second to the Stadium Negara, after the successful June 2012 Destiny of Warriors event. The main event featured the inaugural bout for the ONE Welterweight Championship, between Nobutatsu Suzuki and Brock Larson. Due to missing weight, the women's rematch between Sherylin Lim and Ann Osman was cancelled.

Results

Main card
Weight class				Method	Round	Time	Notes
Welterweight	(Japan) Nobutatsu Suzuki	def.	(United States) Brock Larson	Decision (unanimous)	5	5:00	(Note: For the inaugural ONE Welterweight Championship)
Bantamweight	(South Korea) Dae Hwan Kim	def.	(Philippines) Kevin Belingon	Submission (rear-naked choke)	1	4:39
Flyweight	(Brazil) Adriano Moraes	def.	(Japan) Yasuhiro Urushitani	Submission (rear-naked choke)	2	3:48
Lightweight	(Iran) Kamal Shalorus	def.	(Costa Rica) Ariel Sexton	Decision (unanimous)	3	5:00
Catchweight (129 lb)	(United States) Andrew Leone	def.	(Japan) Shinichi Kojima	Decision (unanimous)	3	5:00
Lightweight	(South Korea) Kotetsu Boku	def.	(France) Arnaud Lepont	TKO (punches)	1	4:06
Lightweight	(Malaysia) Peter Davis	def.	(Pakistan) Waqar Umar	Submission (strikes)	2	3:07
Preliminary card
Weight class				Method	Round	Time	Notes
Featherweight	(Brazil) Herbert Burns	def.	(United States) Harris Sarmiento	Decision (unanimous)	3	5:00
Flyweight	(Malaysia) Saiful Merican	def.	(Cambodia) Khim Dima	Decision (split)	3	5:00

== ONE Fighting Championship: Rise of Heroes ==
ONE Fighting Championship: Rise of Heroes
- Promotion: ONE Fighting Championship
- Date: May 2, 2014
- Venue: SM Mall of Asia Arena
- City: Pasay, Philippines
- Attendance: 7,350

Event chronology
ONE Fighting Championship: War of Nations	ONE Fighting Championship: Rise of Heroes	ONE Fighting Championship: Honor and Glory

ONE Fighting Championship: Rise of Heroes (also known as ONE FC 15) was a mixed martial arts event held by ONE Championship. The event took place on May 2, 2014 at the SM Mall of Asia Arena in Pasay, Philippines

Background

This was the fifth visit by ONE to the Philippines, and the fourth to the Mall of Asia Arena.

The main event featured the first title defense for ONE bantamweight champion Bibiano Fernandes against Masakatsu Ueda, the winner of the ONE Bantamweight Grand Prix.

The card also featured the debut of Philippine top boxer Jujeath Nagaowa against the returning Indian prospect Jeet Toshi.

Results

Main card
Weight class				Method	Round	Time	Notes
Bantamweight	(Brazil) Bibiano Fernandes (c)	def.	(Japan) Masakatsu Ueda	Decision (unanimous)	5	5:00	(Note: For the ONE Bantamweight Championship)
Lightweight	(Philippines) Eduard Folayang	def.	(South Korea) Kotetsu Boku	Decision (unanimous)	3	5:00
Flyweight	(Philippines) Roy Docyogen	def.	(Guam) Joshua Alvarez	Decision (unanimous)	3	5:00
Bantamweight	(Australia) Rob Lisita	def.	(Japan) Yusuke Kawanago	TKO (punches)	1	0:28
Heavyweight	(United Kingdom) James McSweeney	def.	(Australia) Chris Lokteff	KO (flying knee)	1	3:04
Middleweight	(Brazil) Leandro Ataides	def.	(Japan) Tatsuya Mizuno	TKO (punches)	1	0:47
Women's Flyweight	(Philippines) Ana Julaton	def.	(Egypt) Aya-Saeid Saber	TKO (punches and elbows)	3	4:00
Preliminary card
Weight class				Method	Round	Time	Notes
Flyweight	(Philippines) Eugene Toquero	def.	(Malaysia) Gianni Subba	Decision (unanimous)	3	5:00
Women's Atomweight	(Philippines) Jujeath Nagaowa	def.	(India) Jeet Toshi	TKO (punches)	2	1:07

== ONE Fighting Championship: Honor and Glory ==
ONE Fighting Championship: Honor and Glory
- Promotion: ONE Fighting Championship
- Date: May 30, 2014
- Venue: Singapore Indoor Stadium
- City: Kallang, Singapore
- Attendance: 11,100

Event chronology
ONE Fighting Championship: Rise of Heroes	ONE Fighting Championship: Honor and Glory	ONE Fighting Championship: Era of Champions

ONE Fighting Championship: Honor and Glory (also known as ONE FC 16) was a mixed martial arts event held by ONE Championship. The event took place on May 30, 2014 at the Singapore Indoor Stadium in Kallang, Singapore.

Background

The event featured the debut of top American welterweight and former Bellator MMA champion Ben Askren.

A Bantamweight fight was scheduled between Ji Xian and Thanh Vu but the bout has been cancelled after Ji Xian failed to make the required bantamweight limit.

Results

Main card
Weight class				Method	Round	Time	Notes
Welterweight	(United States) Ben Askren	def.	(Azerbaijan) Bakhtiyar Abbasov	Submission (arm-triangle choke)	1	4:21
Lightweight	(Netherlands) Vincent Latoel	def.	(Hong Kong) Eddie Ng	KO (punches)	1	3:16
Featherweight	(Mongolia) Jadamba Narantungalag	def.	(Philippines) Honorio Banario	Decision (unanimous)	3	5:00
Lightweight	(United States) Caros Fodor	def.	(Netherlands) Willy Ni	Submission (kimura)	1	3:29
Featherweight	(United States) Major Overall	def.	(Brazil) Bruno Pucci	KO (punches and soccer kick)	1	2:52
Heavyweight	(Hong Kong) Alain Ngalani	vs.	(United Kingdom) Chi Lewis Parry	No Contest	1	N/A	(Note: Inadvertent groin shot)
Bantamweight	(Singapore) Radeem Rahman	def.	(Malaysia) Raymond Tan	TKO (punches)	2	2:46
Preliminary card
Weight class				Method	Round	Time	Notes
Bantamweight	(United States) Casey Suire	def.	(Singapore) Stephen Langdown	Submission (rear-naked choke)	1	3:19
Catchweight (177 lb)	(Malaysia) Nik Harris	def.	(United States) Brad Robinson	Decision (split)	3	5:00

== ONE Fighting Championship: Era of Champions ==
ONE Fighting Championship: Era of Champions
- Promotion: ONE Fighting Championship
- Date: June 14, 2014
- Venue: Mata Elang International Stadium
- City: Jakarta, Indonesia
- Attendance: 6,500

Event chronology
ONE Fighting Championship: Honor and Glory	ONE Fighting Championship: Era of Champions	ONE Fighting Championship: War of Dragons

ONE Fighting Championship: Era of Champions (also known as ONE FC 17) was a mixed martial arts event held by ONE Championship. The event took place on June 14, 2014 at the Mata Elang International Stadium in Jakarta, Indonesia.

Background

In the main event, dynamic Brazilian striker Adriano Moraes and Japanese MMA veteran Kosuke "Rambo" Suzuki met in a featured Flyweight bout. Meanwhile, Indonesian MMA star Fransino Tirta faced Egyptian prospect Sami Amin in the co-headliner.

The winner of the Flyweight bout between Geje Eustaquio and Kentaro Watanabe will meet the winner of the main event between Adriano Moraes and Kosuke Suzuki in the inaugural ONE Flyweight Championship fight.

Results

Main card
Weight class				Method	Round	Time	Notes
Flyweight	(Brazil) Adriano Moraes	def.	(Japan) Kosuke Suzuki	Submission (arm-triangle choke)	3	1:25	(Note: 1. 1 Contendership for the ONE Flyweight Championship)
Bantamweight	(Indonesia) Fransino Tirta	def.	(Egypt) Sami Amin	Submission (rear-naked choke)	1	1:08
Flyweight	(Philippines) Geje Eustaquio	def.	(Japan) Kentaro Watanabe	Decision (unanimous)	3	5:00	(Note: 1. 1 Contendership for the ONE Flyweight Championship)
Middleweight	(Myanmar) Aung La Nsang	def.	(Egypt) Mahmoud Salama	KO (punches)	1	1:06
Featherweight	(Malaysia) Ev Ting	def.	(Indonesia) Yohan Mulia Legowo	TKO (knees and punches)	1	4:35
Flyweight	(Thailand) Dejdamrong Sor Amnuaysirichoke	def.	(Philippines) Jomanz Omanz	TKO (knees and punches)	1	4:33
Flyweight	(Malaysia) Gianni Subba	def.	(Philippines) Ruel Catalan	Submission (elbows)	2	2:43
Preliminary card
Weight class				Method	Round	Time	Notes
Welterweight	(Iran) Mohammad Sotounzadeh	def.	(Indonesia) Zuli Silawanto	KO (slam and punches)	1	2:24
Women's Bantamweight	(Indonesia) Desi Rahayu	def.	(Malaysia) Ella Tang	Decision (unanimous)	3	5:00

== ONE Fighting Championship: War of Dragons ==
ONE Fighting Championship: War of Dragons
- Promotion: ONE Fighting Championship
- Date: July 11, 2014
- Venue: NTU Sports Center
- City: Taipei, Taiwan
- Attendance: 3,880

Event chronology
ONE Fighting Championship: Era of Champions	ONE Fighting Championship: War of Dragons	ONE Fighting Championship: Reign of Champions

ONE Fighting Championship: War of Dragons (also known as ONE FC 18) was a mixed martial arts event held by ONE Championship. The event took place on July 11, 2014 at the NTU Sports Center in Taipei, Taiwan.

Background

This marked the first visit of ONE to Taiwan. In the main event, Rob Lisita faced Eric "The Natural" Kelly for a shot at the ONE Featherweight Championship.

A lightweight bout between Zhang Zheng Jie and Rayner Kinsiong was scheduled but Zhang Zheng Jie failed his pre-fight medical exam and was unable to compete. Rayner Kinsiong failed to make the lightweight limit and instead faced Eilot Corley at a catchweight of 157 lb.

Results

Main card
Weight class				Method	Round	Time	Notes
Featherweight	(Philippines) Eric Kelly	def.	(Australia) Rob Lisita	Submission (rear-naked choke)	2	3:42	(Note: 1. 1 Contendership for the ONE Featherweight Championship)
Lightweight	(Japan) Koji Ando	def.	(Brazil) Rafael Nunes	Submission (rear-naked choke)	1	1:43
Bantamweight	(Japan) Koetsu Okazaki	def.	(Russia) Yusup Saadulaev	TKO (punches)	2	4:21
Cruiserweight	(United States) Jake Butler	def.	(Egypt) Mohamed Ali	TKO (strikes)	3	1:21
Heavyweight	(Canada) Paul Cheng	def.	(Egypt) Mahmoud Hassan	TKO (corner stoppage)	2	5:00
Heavyweight	(United Kingdom) Chi Lewis Parry	def.	(Hong Kong) Alain Ngalani	KO (elbows)	1	4:11
Bantamweight	(Taiwan) Sung Ming Yen	def.	(Singapore) Nicholas Lee	Submission (guillotine choke)	1	1:10
Preliminary card
Weight class				Method	Round	Time	Notes
Catchweight (157 lb)	(United States) Eliot Corley	def.	(Malaysia) Rayner Kinsiong	TKO (strikes)	1	1:36
Featherweight	(United States) Nathan Ng	def.	(France) Florian Garel	Submission (north-south choke)	1	1:23
Welterweight	(Taiwan) Jeff Huang	def.	(India) Bala Shetty	TKO (strikes)	1	3:21

== ONE Fighting Championship: Reign of Champions ==
ONE Fighting Championship: Reign of Champions
- Promotion: ONE Fighting Championship
- Date: August 29, 2014
- Venue: World Trade Centre
- City: Dubai, United Arab Emirates
- Attendance: 7,000

Event chronology
ONE Fighting Championship: War of Dragons	ONE Fighting Championship: Reign of Champions	ONE Fighting Championship: Rise of the Kingdom

ONE Fighting Championship: Reign of Champions (also known as ONE FC 19) was a mixed martial arts event held by ONE Championship. The event took place on August 29, 2014 at the World Trade Centre in Dubai, United Arab Emirates.

Background

This event marked the first visit of ONE to the Emirates and also to the Middle East. The event was headlined by three title defenses, in the Featherweight, Lightweight and Welterweight divisions.

Results

Main card
Weight class				Method	Round	Time	Notes
Lightweight	(Japan) Shinya Aoki (c)	def.	(Iran) Kamal Shalorus	Submission (rear-naked choke)	1	2:15	(Note: For the ONE Lightweight Championship)
Welterweight	(United States) Ben Askren	def.	(Japan) Nobutatsu Suzuki (c)	TKO (punches)	1	1:24	(Note: For the ONE Welterweight Championship)
Featherweight	(Mongolia) Jadamba Narantungalag	def.	(Japan) Koji Oishi (c)	Decision (unanimous)	5	5:00	(Note: For the ONE Featherweight Championship)
Lightweight	(United States) Roger Huerta	def.	(United Kingdom) Christian Holley	TKO (punches)	1	3:13
Cruiserweight	(United Kingdom) James McSweeney	def.	(Brazil) Cristiano Kaminishi	KO (punch & soccer kick)	1	1:17
Featherweight	(Brazil) Herbert Burns	def.	(Japan) Hiroshige Tanaka	Decision (unanimous)	3	5:00
Preliminary card
Weight class				Method	Round	Time	Notes
Catchweight (167 lb)	(Syria) Mohamad Walid	def.	(Philippines) Vaughn Donayre	Submission (armbar)	1	1:05
Flyweight	(Thailand) Dejdamrong Sor Amnuaysirichoke	def.	(Malaysia) Ali Yaakub	Submission (rear-naked choke)	1	2:34
Women's Flyweight	(Malaysia) Ann Osman	def.	(Philippines) Ana Julaton	Decision (split)	3	5:00

== ONE Fighting Championship: Rise of the Kingdom ==
ONE Fighting Championship: Rise of the Kingdom
- Promotion: ONE Fighting Championship
- Date: September 12, 2014
- Venue: Koh Pich Theatre
- City: Phnom Penh, Cambodia
- Attendance: 1,500

Event chronology
ONE Fighting Championship: Reign of Champions	ONE Fighting Championship: Rise of the Kingdom	ONE Fighting Championship: Roar of the Tigers

ONE Fighting Championship: Rise of the Kingdom (also known as ONE FC 20) was a mixed martial arts event held by ONE Championship. The event took place on September 12, 2014 at the Koh Pich Theatre in Phnom Penh, Cambodia.

Background

This event marked the first visit of ONE to Cambodia. The event was headlined by the inaugural contest for the ONE Flyweight Championship, between Geje Eustaquio and Adriano Moraes.

Results

Main card
Weight class				Method	Round	Time	Notes
Flyweight	(Brazil) Adriano Moraes	def.	(Philippines) Geje Eustaquio	Submission (guillotine choke)	2	3:54	(Note: For the inaugural ONE Flyweight Championship)
Lightweight	(United States) Caros Fodor	def.	(Netherlands) Vincent Latoel	Submission (rear-naked choke)	2	4:43
Featherweight	(Cambodia) Samang Dun	def.	(Cambodia) Chan Rothana	DQ (illegal stomp)	1	N/A	(Note: Featherweight Grand Prix Finale)
Lightweight	(France) Arnaud Lepont	def.	(Australia) Suasday Chau	TKO (elbows and punches)	1	2:21
Bantamweight	(Taiwan) Ming Yen Sung	def.	(Singapore) Radeem Rahman	Decision (unanimous)	3	5:00
Featherweight	(Singapore) Amir Khan	def.	(Malaysia) Jian Kai Chee	TKO (punches)	1	2:25
Featherweight	(Cambodia) Samang Dun	def.	(Cambodia) Chin Heng	TKO (punches)	1	2:34	(Note: Featherweight Grand Prix Semi-Final)
Featherweight	(Cambodia) Meas Meu	def.	(Cambodia) Chan Heng	Submission (rear-naked choke)	1	4:07	(Note: Featherweight Grand Prix Alternate)
Featherweight	(Cambodia) Chan Rothana	def.	(Cambodia) Prak Chansin	TKO (punches)	1	4:32	(Note: Featherweight Grand Prix Semi-Final)
Women's Catchweight	(Cambodia) Tharoth Sam	def.	(Cambodia) Vy Srey Chai	Technical Submission (armbar)	1	4:07

== ONE Fighting Championship: Roar of the Tigers ==
ONE Fighting Championship: Roar of the Tigers
- Promotion: ONE Fighting Championship
- Date: October 17, 2014
- Venue: Putra Indoor Stadium
- City: Kuala Lumpur, Malaysia
- Attendance: 5,279

Event chronology
ONE Fighting Championship: Rise of the Kingdom	ONE Fighting Championship: Roar of the Tigers	ONE Fighting Championship: Battle of the Lions

ONE Fighting Championship: Roar of the Tigers (also known as ONE FC 21) was a mixed martial arts event held by ONE Championship. The event was held on October 17, 2014 at the Putra Indoor Stadium in Kuala Lumpur, Malaysia.

Background

ONE Championship returned to Malaysia, with this event headlined by the contest between top Featherweights Marat Gafurov and Rob Lisita.

Results

Main card
Weight class				Method	Round	Time	Notes
Featherweight	(Russia) Marat Gafurov	def.	(Australia) Rob Lisita	Submission (rear-naked choke)	1	1:08
Lightweight	(Malaysia) Peter Davis	def.	(Philippines) Vaughn Donayre	TKO (elbows)	1	4:50
Featherweight	(Malaysia) Ev Ting	def.	(Philippines) Edward Kelly	KO (head kick)	2	4:28
Women's Strawweight	(Malaysia) Ann Osman	def.	(Egypt) Aya Saeid Saber	TKO (elbows)	1	3:15
Featherweight	(Pakistan) Bashir Ahmad	def.	(Thailand) Tanaphong Khunhankaew	Submission (rear-naked choke)	1	4:38
Flyweight	(Thailand) Dejdamrong Sor Amnuaysirichoke	def.	(Malaysia) Saiful Merican	Submission (armbar)	2	2:12
Bantamweight	(Singapore) Stephen Langdown	def.	(Malaysia) Raymond Tan	KO (elbows and soccer kick)	1	2:28
Preliminary card
Bantamweight	(Thailand) Anatpong Bunrad	def.	(Malaysia) Marc Marcellinus	KO (soccer kick)	1	0:26
Welterweight	(Egypt) Hesham Hiba	def.	(Iran) Mohammad Sotounzadeh	TKO (punches)	2	1:02

== ONE Fighting Championship: Battle of the Lions ==
ONE Fighting Championship: Battle of the Lions
- Promotion: ONE Fighting Championship
- Date: November 7, 2014
- Venue: Singapore Indoor Stadium
- City: Kallang, Singapore
- Attendance: 5,534

Event chronology
ONE Fighting Championship: Roar of the Tigers	ONE Fighting Championship: Battle of the Lions	ONE Fighting Championship: Warrior's Way

ONE Fighting Championship: Battle of the Lions (also known as ONE FC 22) was a mixed martial arts event held by ONE Championship. The event took place on November 7, 2014 at the Singapore Indoor Stadium in Kallang, Singapore.

Background

The main event crowned the inaugural ONE Middleweight World Champion, as Leandro Ataides faced Igor Svirid for the title.

Results

Main card
Weight class				Method	Round	Time	Notes
Middleweight	(Kazakhstan) Igor Svirid	def.	(Brazil) Leandro Ataides	TKO (punches)	1	0:17	(Note: For the inaugural ONE Middleweight Championship)
Lightweight	(Japan) Koji Ando	def.	(Brazil) Zorobabel Moreira	TKO (punches and stomps)	3	4:21
Welterweight	(Brazil) Luis Santos	def.	(Azerbaijan) Bakhtiyar Abbasov	Submission (stomp)	1	0:53	(Note: Abbasov appeared to have broken a rib initially with the body kick)
Middleweight	(Japan) Tatsuya Mizuno	def.	(France) Brayan Rafiq	Decision (unanimous)	3	5:00
Welterweight	(Belgium) Christophe Vandijck	def.	(Trinidad and Tobago) Dwayne Hinds	Submission (punches)	1	2:40
Featherweight	(United States) Major Overall	def.	(Philippines) Cary Bullos	Submission (rear-naked choke)	1	0:29
Featherweight	(Australia) Martin Nguyen	def.	(Philippines) Rocky Batolbatol	Submission (rear-naked choke)	2	2:10
Preliminary card
Weight class				Method	Round	Time	Notes
Featherweight	(Singapore) Amir Khan	def.	(Pakistan) Waqar Umar	KO (elbows)	1	1:25
Welterweight	(Taiwan) Jeff Huang	def.	(Indonesia) Zuli Silawanto	Submission (rear-naked choke)	1	3:10
Women’s Atomweight	(Singapore) Kirstie Gannaway	def.	(Malaysia) Adek Omar	Submission (triangle choke)	1	2:34

== ONE Fighting Championship: Warrior's Way ==
ONE Fighting Championship: Warrior's Way
- Promotion: ONE Fighting Championship
- Date: December 5, 2014
- Venue: SM Mall of Asia Arena
- City: Pasay, Philippines
- Attendance: 20,000

Event chronology
ONE Fighting Championship: Battle of the Lions	ONE Fighting Championship: Warrior's Way	ONE Fighting Championship: Dynasty of Champions (Beijing)

ONE Fighting Championship: Warrior's Way (also known as ONE FC 23) was a mixed martial arts event held by ONE Championship. The event took place on December 5, 2014 at the SM Mall of Asia Arena in Pasay, Philippines.

Background

This event featured the debut of former UFC veteran Brandon Vera. His opponent is URCC Heavyweight Champion Igor Subora.

Results

Main card
Weight class				Method	Round	Time	Notes
Bantamweight	(Brazil) Bibiano Fernandes	def.	(South Korea) Dae Hwan Kim	Submission (rear-naked choke)	2	1:16	(Note: For the ONE Bantamweight Championship)
Heavyweight	(United States) Brandon Vera	def.	(Ukraine) Igor Subora	TKO (punch and soccer kicks)	1	3:54
Lightweight	(Russia) Timofey Nastyukhin	def.	(Philippines) Eduard Folayang	KO (flying knee and soccer kicks)	1	3:11
Cruiserweight	(Brazil) Roger Gracie	def.	(United Kingdom) James McSweeney	TKO (strikes)	3	3:15
Bantamweight	(Philippines) Kevin Belingon	def.	(Japan) Koetsu Okazaki	Decision (unanimous)	3	5:00
Featherweight	(Brazil) Herbert Burns	def.	(Philippines) Honorio Banario	Submission (rear-naked choke)	1	3:59
Cruiserweight	(United States) Jake Butler	def.	(France) Sylvain Potard	Decision (unanimous)	3	5:00
Flyweight	(Thailand) Dejdamrong Sor Amnuaysirichoke	def.	(Philippines) Rene Catalan	KO (knee)	1	2:30
Women's Flyweight	(Philippines) Ana Julaton	def.	(Egypt) Walaa Abbas Mohamed Kamaly	Decision (unanimous)	3	5:00
Women's Atomweight	(Philippines) Jujeath Nagaowa	def.	(Cambodia) Tharoth Sam	TKO (punches)	2	3:34

== ONE Fighting Championship: Dynasty of Champions (Beijing) ==
ONE Fighting Championship: Dynasty of Champions (Beijing)
- Promotion: ONE Fighting Championship
- Date: December 19, 2014
- Venue: The Gymnasium Of National Olympic Sports Centre
- City: Beijing, China

Event chronology
ONE Fighting Championship: Warrior's Way	ONE Fighting Championship: Dynasty of Champions (Beijing)	ONE Championship: Age of Champions

ONE Fighting Championship: Dynasty of Champions (Beijing) (also known as ONE FC 24) was a mixed martial arts event held by ONE Fighting Championship. The event took place on December 19, 2014 in Beijing, China.

Background

This event marked the first visit of ONE to China. The event was originally scheduled to take place on October 31, 2014 but the organization made the announcement to move it days leading up to the event.

Results

Main card
Weight class				Method	Round	Time	Notes
Bantamweight	(China) Ji Xian	def.	(China) Song Yadong	Decision (unanimous)	3	5:00
Lightweight	(Australia) Adrian Pang	def.	(Netherlands) Vincent Latoel	Submission (guillotine choke)	3	2:15
Featherweight	(China) Li Kai Wen	def.	(China) Wang Ya Wei	Decision (unanimous)	3	5:00	(Note: Featherweight Tournament Finale for the Beijing Featherweight Championship)
Flyweight	(China) Wei Bin Li	def.	(China) Wang Wei	Decision (unanimous)	3	5:00	(Note: Flyweight Tournament Finale for the Beijing Flyweight Championship)
Catchweight (188 lb)	(Poland) Michal Pasternak	def.	(Portugal) Rafael Silva	Decision (unanimous)	3	5:00
Lightweight	(Costa Rica) Ariel Sexton	def.	(Russia) Anvar Alizhanov	Submission (reverse triangle-armbar)	1	3:18
Featherweight	(China) Wang Ya Wei	def.	(China) Li Gen	TKO (strikes)	1	2:55	(Note: Featherweight Tournament Semi Final)
Featherweight	(China) Li Kai Wen	def.	(China) He Nannan	TKO (strikes)	1	2:19	(Note: Featherweight Tournament Semi Final)
Flyweight	(China) Wang Wei	def.	(China) Liu Xu	Decision (unanimous)	3	5:00	(Note: Flyweight Tournament Semi Final)
Flyweight	(China) Wei Bin Li	def.	(China) Jie Hao Yi	Submission (armbar)	1	2:51	(Note: Flyweight Tournament Semi Final)

== See also ==
- 2014 in UFC
- 2014 in Absolute Championship Berkut
- 2014 in Konfrontacja Sztuk Walki
- 2014 in Road FC
- 2014 in Kunlun Fight
