= Jeet Toshi =

Indian mixed martial arts (MMA) fighter and boxer

- Born: Priyanka Jeet Toshi; April 30, 1991 (age 35); Delhi, India
- Nationality: Indian
- Height: 160 cm (5 ft 3 in)
- Weight: 48 kg (106 lb; 7 st 8 lb)
- Division: Atomweight (MMA); Bantamweight (Boxing)
- Fighting out of: Bahrain
- Team: Round One Boxing Bahrain
- Years active: 2012–present

Mixed martial arts record
- Total: 8
- Wins: 4
- By submission: 1
- By decision: 3
- Losses: 4
- By knockout: 2
- By submission: 2
- Draws: 0

Other information
- Mixed martial arts record from Sherdog

Priyanka "Jeet" Toshi (born 30 April 1991) is an Indian-Bahraini mixed martial artist and professional boxer. She is the first female mixed martial artist to represent India professionally at ONE Championship in 2012. In 2019, she became the first female professional boxer to represent Bahrain at the international level.

== Early and personal life ==
Toshi started out competing in kickboxing competitions when she was 16 in Delhi.

== Mixed martial arts career ==
=== ONE Championship ===
In 2012, Toshi became the first Indian fighter to sign with ONE Championship. She made her debut against Nicole Chua at War of the Lions in Singapore and lost the fight via rear-naked choke.

In 2015, Toshi got her first win in ONE by defeating Cambodia's Tharoth Sam at ONE Championship: Kingdom of Khmer via unanimous decision.

== Boxing career ==
Toshi made her boxing debut for Bahrain on 5 November 2019 in the Sovereign Boxing Championship held at Dubai. She defeated India's Gisel Camoens and won the bout by unanimous decision.

In 2022, Toshi participated in the first edition of Bahrain's Domestic Boxing event held by Bahrain Boxing Federation and became the champion in the Women's Elite 50 kg category defeating her compatriot Jyoti Singh.

== Mixed martial arts record ==
Professional record breakdown
8 matches	4 wins	4 losses
By knockout	0	2
By submission	1	2
By decision	3	0

Res.	Record	Opponent	Method	Event	Date	Round	Time	Location	Notes
Loss	4–4	Haidy Ahmed	TKO	UAE Warriors 26: Arabia 6	26 February 2022	1	5:00	Abu Dhabi, United Arab Emirates	
Win	4–3	Fatemeh Moslemi	Decision (unanimous)	Kumite 1 League	29 September 2018	3	5:00	Mumbai, India	
Loss	3–3	Jenny Huang	Submission (Arm-Triangle Choke)	ONE: Unbreakable Warriors	2 September 2016	1	3:21	Kuala Lumpur, Malaysia	
Win	3–2	Tharoth Sam	Decision (unanimous)	ONE: Kingdom of Khmer	5 December 2015	3	5:00	Phnom Penh, Cambodia	
Loss	2–2	Jujeath Nagaowa	TKO (Punches)	ONE FC: Rise of Heroes	2 May 2014	2	1:07	Manila, Philippines	
Win	2–1	Praveen Kalkal	Submission (Rear-Naked Choke)	Super Fight League 30-31	12 October 2013	1	1:06	Mumbai, India	
Loss	1–1	Nicole Chua	Submission (Rear Naked Choke)	ONE FC: War of the Lions	31 March 2012	1	2:07	Kallang, Singapore	
Win	1–0	Pooja Mehra	Decision (unanimous)	Full Contact Championship 5	25 February 2012	3	5:00	Mumbai, India	

== Championships and accomplishments ==
=== Boxing ===
- Clash of the Countries Sovereign Boxing Tournament
  - Sovereign Boxing Championship (2019)
- Bahrain Domestic Boxing
  - Women's Elite 50 kg (2022)

== See also ==
- List of female mixed martial artists
