= 2013 in ONE Championship =

Mixed martial arts events

Information
- First date: February 2, 2013

Events
- Total events: 7

Fights
- Total fights: 70
- Title fights: 6

Chronology
2012 in ONE	2013 in ONE Championship	2014 in ONE

The year 2013 was the 3rd year in the history of the ONE Championship, a mixed martial arts promotion based in Singapore.

== Tournament bracket ==
=== Bantamweight Grand Prix ===
==== ONE Bantamweight Grand Prix bracket ====
Semi-finals
(Philippines) Kevin Belingon	TKO
(Vietnam) Thanh Vu	2r.
(Japan) Masakatsu Ueda	SUB
(United States) Jens Pulver	2r.

Final
(Philippines) Kevin Belingon	3r.
(Japan) Masakatsu Ueda	UD

=== Malaysia Featherweight Tournament ===
==== ONE Malaysia Featherweight Tournament bracket ====
Semi-finals
(Malaysia) AJ Lias Mansor	3r.
(Malaysia) Jian Kai Chee	UD
(Malaysia) Melvin Yeoh	SUB
(Malaysia) Raymond Tiew	2r.

Final
(Malaysia) AJ Lias Mansor^{1}	UD
(Malaysia) Melvin Yeoh	3r.

^{1}Jian Kai Chee was forced to pull out of his bout with Yeoh due to injury and could not participate in the finals of the Grand Prix. He was subsequently replaced by AJ Lias Mansor.

== List of events ==
ONE Championship
No.	Event	Date	Venue	Location
1	ONE Fighting Championship: Return of Warriors	February 2, 2013	Putra Indoor Stadium	Kuala Lumpur, Malaysia
2	ONE Fighting Championship: Kings and Champions	April 5, 2013	Singapore Indoor Stadium	Kallang, Singapore
3	ONE Fighting Championship: Rise to Power	May 31, 2013	SM Mall of Asia Arena	Pasay, Philippines
4	ONE Fighting Championship: Champions & Warriors	September 13, 2013	Istora Senayan	Jakarta, Indonesia
5	ONE Fighting Championship: Total Domination	October 18, 2013	Singapore Indoor Stadium	Kallang, Singapore
6	ONE Fighting Championship: Warrior Spirit	November 15, 2013	Putra Indoor Stadium	Kuala Lumpur, Malaysia
7	ONE Fighting Championship: Moment of Truth	December 6, 2013	SM Mall of Asia Arena	Pasay, Philippines

== ONE Fighting Championship: Return of Warriors ==
ONE Fighting Championship: Return of Warriors
- Promotion: ONE Fighting Championship
- Date: February 2, 2013
- Venue: Putra Indoor Stadium
- City: Kuala Lumpur, Malaysia
- Attendance: 9,376

Event chronology
ONE Fighting Championship: Rise of Kings	ONE Fighting Championship: Return of Warriors	ONE Fighting Championship: Kings and Champions

ONE Fighting Championship: Return of Warriors (also known as ONE FC 7) was a mixed martial arts event held by ONE Championship. The event took place on February 2, 2013 at the 16,000 capacity Putra Indoor Stadium in Kuala Lumpur, Malaysia.

Background

The event crowned the first ONE Featherweight Champion, in a matchup originally scheduled for ONE FC: Rise of Kings, between Philippine fighters Eric Kelly and Honorio Banario, which was scratched at that time due to PPV time constraints.

The event also held the first two bouts of the 4-man ONE Malaysian National Featherweight Championship Tournament and the final first-round bout of the ONE Bantamweight Grand Prix.

Results

Main Card
Weight class				Method	Round	Time	Notes
Featherweight	Honorio Banario	def.	Eric Kelly	TKO (eye injury)	4	1:01	(Note: For the inaugural ONE Featherweight World Championship.)
Flyweight	Shinichi Kojima	def.	Roy Docyogen	Submission (guillotine choke)	2	4:47
Lightweight	Lowen Tynanes	def.	Vuyisile Colossa	Submission (rear-naked choke)	1	4:37
Lightweight	Peter Davis	def.	Leo Krishna	TKO (doctor stoppage)	1	2:01
Welterweight	Adam Shahir Kayoom	def.	Zuli Silawanto	Submission (rear-naked choke)	1	3:41
Bantamweight	Thanh Vu	def.	Mohd Fouzein Fozi	TKO (knees and punches)	1	1:03	(Note: ONE Bantamweight Grand Prix Quarterfinal.)
Featherweight	Melvin Yeoh	def.	Raymond Tiew	Submission (triangle choke)	2	3:29	(Note: ONE Malaysia Featherweight Tournament Semifinal.)
Featherweight	Jian Kai Chee	def.	A.J. Lias Mansor	Decision (unanimous)	3	5:00	(Note: ONE Malaysia Featherweight Tournament Semifinal.)
Preliminary Card
Catchweight (130 lb)	Gianni Subba	def.	Saiful Merican	Submission (armbar)	2	4:08
Cruiserweight	Jake Butler	def.	Antoni Romulo	TKO (punches)	1	2:46

== ONE Fighting Championship: Kings and Champions ==
ONE Fighting Championship: Kings and Champions
- Promotion: ONE Fighting Championship
- Date: April 5, 2013
- Venue: Singapore Indoor Stadium
- City: Kallang, Singapore
- Attendance: 10,017

Event chronology
ONE Fighting Championship: Return of Warriors	ONE Fighting Championship: Kings and Champions	ONE Fighting Championship: Rise to Power

ONE Fighting Championship: Kings and Champions (also known as ONE FC 8) was a mixed martial arts event held by ONE Championship. The event took place on April 5, 2013 at the 12,000 capacity Singapore Indoor Stadium in Kallang, Singapore.

Background

This event held the first title defense for ONE Lightweight Champion Kotetsu Boku against Japanese top contender Shinya Aoki. The event also marked the return of fighters like Melvin Manhoef, Leandro Issa and Jake Butler to the ONE cage, and the two semifinals of the ONE Bantamweight Grand Prix.

Results

Main card
Weight class				Method	Round	Time	Notes
Lightweight	Shinya Aoki	def.	Kotetsu Boku (c)	Submission (rear-naked choke)	2	2:01	(Note: For the ONE Lightweight World Championship.)
Middleweight	Brock Larson	def.	Melvin Manhoef	Decision (unanimous)	3	5:00
Bantamweight	Masakatsu Ueda	def.	Jens Pulver	Submission (brabo choke)	2	3:52	(Note: ONE Bantamweight Grand Prix Semifinal.)
Bantamweight	Kevin Belingon	def.	Thanh Vu	TKO (punches)	2	1:00	(Note: ONE Bantamweight Grand Prix Semifinal.)
Lightweight	Eddie Ng	def.	Arnaud Lepont	Submission (armbar)	2	4:45
Bantamweight	Leandro Issa	def.	Yusup Saadulaev	Decision (unanimous)	3	5:00
Flyweight	Alex Silva	def.	Rene Catalan	Submission (armbar)	1	4:54
Featherweight	Bashir Ahmad	def.	Shannon Wiratchai	Decision (unanimous)	3	5:00
Preliminary Card
Cruiserweight	Jake Butler	def.	Swain Cangco	TKO (punches)	1	2:52
Flyweight	Chen Yun Ting	def.	Ronald Low	TKO (punches)	1	3:58

== ONE Fighting Championship: Rise to Power ==
ONE Fighting Championship: Rise to Power
- Promotion: ONE Fighting Championship
- Date: May 31, 2013
- Venue: SM Mall of Asia Arena
- City: Pasay, Philippines
- Attendance: 14,327

Event chronology
ONE Fighting Championship: Kings and Champions	ONE Fighting Championship: Rise to Power	ONE Fighting Championship: Champions & Warriors

ONE Fighting Championship: Rise to Power (also known as ONE FC 9) was a mixed martial arts event held by ONE Championship. The event took place on May 31, 2013 at the 20,000 capacity SM Mall of Asia Arena in Pasay, Philippines.

Background

This was the second visit of ONE to the Philippines, after the successful August 2012 event held at the Araneta Coliseum.

The event held the first title defense for ONE Featherweight Champion Honorio Banario against Japanese contender Koji Oishi. The original matchup for the title was against Korean top contender Bae Young Kwon, but was scrapped due to the Kwon commitment with the local military service.

Results

Main Card
Weight class				Method	Round	Time	Notes
Featherweight	Koji Oishi	def.	Honorio Banario (c)	KO (punches)	2	1:45	(Note: For the ONE Featherweight World Championship)
Bantamweight	Bibiano Fernandes	def.	Koetsu Okazaki	Decision (unanimous)	5	5:00	(Note: For the interim ONE Bantamweight World Championship.)
Bantamweight	Masakatsu Ueda	def.	Kevin Belingon	Decision (unanimous)	3	5:00	(Note: ONE Bantamweight Grand Prix Final.)
Flyweight	Yasuhiro Urushitani	def.	Roy Docyogen	Decision (split)	3	5:00
Welterweight	Nobutatsu Suzuki	def.	Phil Baroni	TKO (punches)	1	4:17
Lightweight	Kamal Shalorus	def.	Eduard Folayang	Decision (unanimous)	3	5:00
Catchweight (127 lb)	Andrew Leone	def.	Geje Eustaquio	Decision (unanimous)	3	5:00
Preliminary Card
Catchweight (144 lb)	Yusup Saadulaev	def.	Ryan Diaz	Submission (brabo choke)	2	2:57
Lightweight	Lowen Tynanes	def.	Felipe Enomoto	TKO (elbows)	1	2:41
Catchweight (271 lb)	Tony Johnson Jr.	def.	Tim Sylvia	TKO (doctor stoppage)	3	3:25

== ONE Fighting Championship: Champions & Warriors ==
ONE Fighting Championship: Champions & Warriors
- Promotion: ONE Fighting Championship
- Date: September 13, 2013
- Venue: Istora Senayan
- City: Jakarta, Indonesia
- Attendance: 6,897

Event chronology
ONE Fighting Championship: Rise to Power	ONE Fighting Championship: Champions & Warriors	ONE Fighting Championship: Total Domination

ONE Fighting Championship: Champions & Warriors (also known as ONE FC 10) was a mixed martial arts event held by ONE Championship. The event took place on September 13, 2013 at the 10,000 capacity Istora Senayan in Jakarta, Indonesia.

Background

This event marked the second visit of ONE to Indonesia, after the February 2012 event held at the BritAma Arena.

Yasuhiro Urushitani was scheduled to face Shinichi Kojima in the main event for the inaugural ONE Flyweight Championship but had to pull out due to an injury and was replaced by Andrew Leone. Although on September 10, 2013 Leone also pulled out of the title bout and the fight was scrapped all together.

Results

Main Card
Weight class				Method	Round	Time	Notes
Lightweight	(South Africa) Vuyisile Colossa	def.	(South Korea) Kotetsu Boku	Decision (unanimous)	3	5:00
Welterweight	(Netherlands) Vincent Latoel	def.	(Netherlands) Willy Ni	Submission (guillotine choke)	1	1:25
Catchweight (198 lb)	(United States) Jake Butler	def.	(Canada) James Kouame	Submission (arm-triangle choke)	1	2:11
Featherweight	(Brazil) Bruno Pucci	def.	(Pakistan) Bashir Ahmad	Submission (rear-naked choke)	1	3:13
Cruiserweight	(Indonesia) Vincent Majid	def.	(Malaysia) Eugenio Tan	Submission (kimura)	1	1:30
Flyweight	(Brazil) Almiro Barros	def.	(Australia) Kian Phan	Decision (unanimous)	3	5:00
Heavyweight	(Hong Kong) Alain Ngalani	def.	(Egypt) Mahmoud Hassan	TKO (strikes)	1	0:31
Preliminary Card
Lightweight	(United States) Caros Fodor	def.	(South Korea) Yang Seung Ho	Decision (unanimous)	3	5:00
Featherweight	(Indonesia) Max Metino	def.	(Cambodia) Long Sophy	Submission (kimura)	2	3:24
Flyweight	(Malaysia) Raymond Tan	def.	(Indonesia) Brianata Rosadhi	Submission (guillotine choke)	1	0:21

== ONE Fighting Championship: Total Domination ==
ONE Fighting Championship: Total Domination
- Promotion: ONE Fighting Championship
- Date: October 18, 2013
- Venue: Singapore Indoor Stadium
- City: Kallang, Singapore
- Attendance: 9,032

Event chronology
ONE Fighting Championship: Champions & Warriors	ONE Fighting Championship: Total Domination	ONE Fighting Championship: Warrior Spirit

ONE Fighting Championship: Total Domination (also known as ONE FC 11) was a mixed martial arts event held by ONE Championship. The event took place on October 18, 2013 at the Singapore Indoor Stadium in Kallang, Singapore.

Background

The main event was a unification bout for the ONE bantamweight world title between champion Soo Chul Kim and interim champion Bibiano Fernandes.

The Co-Main event featured ONE's Lightweight Champion Shinya Aoki dropping a division to compete in a non-title fight against Cody Stevens.

On October 19, 2013, ONE officials deemed the Flyweight bout between Rene Catalan and Khim Dima a No Contest due to several illegal strikes perceived during a review of the fight.

Results

Main Card
Weight class				Method	Round	Time	Notes
Bantamweight	(Brazil) Bibiano Fernandes (ic)	def.	(South Korea) Soo Chul Kim (c)	Decision (unanimous)	5	5:00	(Note: For unification of the ONE Bantamweight Championship)
Featherweight	(Japan) Shinya Aoki	def.	(United States) Cody Stevens	Decision (unanimous)	3	5:00
Lightweight	(Hong Kong) Eddie Ng	def.	(Malaysia) Peter Davis	Submission (armbar)	1	1:46
Middleweight	(Japan) Tatsuya Mizuno	def.	(Portugal) Rafael Silva	Decision (unanimous)	3	5:00
Cruiserweight	(France) Sylvain Potard	def.	(United States) Jake Butler	TKO (punches)	2	0:42
Featherweight	(Thailand) Shannon Wiratchai	def.	(United States) Mitch Chilson	TKO (soccer kicks and punches)	1	1:52
Flyweight	(Cambodia) Khim Dima	vs.	(Philippines) Rene Catalan	No contest	2	3:40	(Note: Result reviewed as a No Contest due to illegal strikes)
Preliminary Card
Weight class				Method	Round	Time	Notes
Women's Strawweight	(Singapore) Sherilyn Lim	def.	(Malaysia) Ann Osman	Decision (split)	3	5:00
Lightweight	(Singapore) Juan Wen Jie	def.	(Malaysia) Alex Lim	TKO (punch)	2	0:18
Bantamweight	(Singapore) Stephen Langdown	def.	(Malaysia) Marc Marcellinus	TKO (strikes)	1	1:49

== ONE Fighting Championship: Warrior Spirit ==
ONE Fighting Championship: Warrior Spirit
- Promotion: ONE Fighting Championship
- Date: November 15, 2013
- Venue: Putra Indoor Stadium
- City: Bukit Jalil, Kuala Lumpur, Malaysia
- Attendance: 12,000

Event chronology
ONE Fighting Championship: Total Domination	ONE Fighting Championship: Warrior Spirit	ONE Fighting Championship: Moment of Truth

ONE Fighting Championship: Warrior Spirit (also known as ONE FC 12) was a mixed martial arts event held by ONE Championship. The event took place on November 15, 2013 at the Putra Indoor Stadium in Bukit Jalil, Kuala Lumpur, Malaysia.

Background

The main event was going to be a contest for the inaugural ONE Welterweight Championship between Adam Kayoom and Nobutatsu Suzuki. On November 11, 2013, ONE officials announced that Adam Kayoom was injured, and was going to be replaced by Vitor Pinto. However, Pinto was not medically cleared and the bout was cancelled.

Results

Main Card
Weight class				Method	Round	Time	Notes
Catchweight	(Russia) Yusup Saadulaev	def.	(Brazil) Adriano Moraes	Decision (split)	3	5:00
Middleweight	(Brazil) Leandro Ataides	def.	(France) Brayan Rafiq	KO (punches)	1	4:19
Heavyweight	(Australia) Chris Lokteff	def.	(United States) Tony Johnson	Decision (split)	3	5:00
Lightweight	(Malaysia) Peter Davis	def.	(Egypt) Alaa Mazloum	Submission (rear naked choke)	2	1:23
Flyweight	(Malaysia) Gianni Subba	def.	(Malaysia) Chen Yun Ting	TKO (elbows)	1	3:03
Featherweight	(Malaysia) AJ Lias Mansor	def.	(Malaysia) Melvin Yeoh	Decision (unanimous)	3	5:00	(Note: Malaysian National Featherweight Championship Tournament Final)
Flyweight	(Malaysia) Saiful Merican	def.	(Cambodia) Tok Sophon	Decision (unanimous)	3	5:00
Preliminary Card
Weight class				Method	Round	Time	Notes
Welterweight	(Belgium) Samir Mrabet	def.	(United States) Steven Durr	Decision (unanimous)	3	5:00
Welterweight	(Malaysia) Nik Harris	def.	(Indonesia) Zuli Silawanto	TKO (retirement)	2	5:00
Bantamweight	(United States) Casey Suire	def.	(Malaysia) Raymond Tan	Submission (Guillotine choke)	1	3:28

== ONE Fighting Championship: Moment of Truth ==
ONE Fighting Championship: Moment of Truth
- Promotion: ONE Fighting Championship
- Date: December 6, 2013
- Venue: SM Mall of Asia Arena
- City: Pasay, Philippines
- Attendance: 10,106

Event chronology
ONE Fighting Championship: Warrior Spirit	ONE Fighting Championship: Moment of Truth	ONE Fighting Championship: War of Nations

ONE Fighting Championship: Moment of Truth (also known as ONE FC 13) was a mixed martial arts event held by ONE Championship. The event took place on December 6, 2013 at the SM Mall of Asia Arena in Pasay, Philippines

Background

The main event was a rematch for the ONE Featherweight world title between champion Koji Oishi and former champion Honorio Banario.

The event also featured the return of local favorites Eduard Folayang and Geje Eustaquio.

Results

Main Card
Weight class				Method	Round	Time	Notes
Featherweight	(Japan) Koji Oishi (c)	def.	(Philippines) Honorio Banario	KO (punch)	3	1:42	(Note: Rematch for the ONE Featherweight Championship)
Bantamweight	(Philippines) Kevin Belingon	def.	(Spain) David Aranda Santacana	KO (punches)	1	2:53
Lightweight	(Philippines) Eduard Folayang	def.	(Netherlands) Vincent Latoel	Decision (unanimoua)	3	5:00
Lightweight	(South Africa) Vuyisile Colossa	def.	(United States) Caros Fodor	Decision (unanimous)	3	5:00
Flyweight	(Philippines) Geje Eustaquio	def.	(Philippines) Eugene Toquero	Decision (unanimous)	3	5:00
Bantamweight	(South Korea) Dae Hwan Kim	def.	(Vietnam) Thanh Vu	Submission (rear-naked choke)	2	4:10
Heavyweight	(Canada) Paul Cheng	def.	(Hong Kong) Alain Ngalani	Submission (verbal tapout)	1	4:54
Preliminary Card
Weight class				Method	Round	Time	Notes
Bantamweight	(Japan) Koetsu Okazaki	def.	(Guam) Joshua Alvarez	Submission (rear-naked choke)	2	3:13
Flyweight	(Philippines) Ruel Catalan	def.	(Cambodia) Khim Dima	TKO (referee stoppage)	1	3:35
Featherweight	(Brazil) Herbert Burns	def.	(Philippines) Edward Kelly	Submission (rear-naked choke)	1	0:44

== See also ==
- 2013 in UFC
- 2013 in Konfrontacja Sztuk Walki
- 2013 in Road FC
