= Full Metal Dojo =

Martial arts promoter based in Thailand

- Sport: Combat sports: (MMA; Kickboxing; Muay Thai; Lethwei; Bareknuckle boxing; Submission grappling)
- Founded: 7 June 2014; 12 years ago
- Owner: Kingdom Co Ltd
- CEO: Jon Nutt
- Region: Asia
- Website: fullmetaldojo.net

Full Metal Dojo (FMD) is a combat sports and entertainment promotion led by American promoter Jon Nutt. The promotion is considered Thailand's top mixed martial arts promotion. It is the first mixed martial arts promotion to host an event in Phuket and is credited for pioneering MMA in Thailand. Full Metal Dojo runs the regular Fight Circus which has developed a cult following. Full Metal Dojo's Fight Circus is famous for breaking the mold of traditional combat sports and has been described by the Spanish newspaper MARCA as the "mad scientists" of the fighting world. The show has been referred as wacky, bizarre, unconventional, outrageous as well as hosting freakshow fights.

The types of matches at Fight Circus include inter-gender grappling matches, kicking-only bouts, 2 versus 1 fights, dwarf fighting, Lethwei fights, fighting inside telephone booths, Indian leg wrestling with Siamese twins boxing being a regular type of match at these events. Originally focused on mixed martial arts, Full Metal Dojo events have since focused on the Fight Circus franchise. The promotion held its first event on June 7, 2014, in Phuket, Thailand.

== History ==
=== Full Metal Dojo ===
In 2014, American expatriate to Thailand, Kunlun Fight commentator, promoter and FOX Sports Asia host Jon Nutt launched the Full Metal Dojo promotion. Nutt was a former bouncer and bounty hunter in Boston. From 2011 to 2013, prior to launching FMD, Nutt operated an MMA promotion called DARE Fight Sports in Thailand. After becoming fed up with normal mixed martial arts events, Nutt launched Full Metal Dojo.

On June 7, 2014, Full Metal Dojo's inaugural event took place at Seduction Night Club in Patong, Phuket, Thailand. It marked the first mixed martial event to be held in Phuket with an attendance of around 500 in attendance. In 2017, FMD announced a new sponsorship deal consisting of two rival Thai real estate firms, Siam Real Estate and BKK BestLife Real Estate competing on Full Metal Dojo's Facebook page in a series of posts where online fans would vote on the most best property in various sector of Bangkok.

On November 3, 2018, two of Thailand's top female atomweights Suwanan Boonsorn and future UFC fighter Loma Lookboonmee for the vacant Full Metal Dojo Atomweight Championship at Full Metal Dojo 16: Big Trouble in Little Bangkok. Suwanan Boonsorn won the fight by an armbar submission in the first-round to win the title. In the main event, Finland's Glenn Sparv won the inaugural Full Metal Dojo middleweight sword via second-round TKO over Iranian wrestler Mehdi Bagheri. FMD doesn't give championship belts, instead the promotion awards Championship Swords such as samurai swords to its champions. In 2020, at the occasion of FDM 18, the Welterweight Champion received a hand forged Thai sword crafted by Ajarn Kor Neeow who was previously featured in Roads & Kingdoms and dubbed "The last traditional Dha sword maker in South East Asia". In 2018, FMD announced it would be starting an amateur league.

On March 5, 2021, before the establishment of BKFC Thailand, Bare Knuckle Fighting Championship partnered with Full Metal Dojo to organize a bare-knuckle boxing event titled Bare Knuckle Kingdom. The event featured a number of fighters who would later compete on BKFC Thailand. The event was broadcast on the BKFC TV app.

=== Fight Circus ===
In August 2020, Full Metal Dojo launched the Fight Circus events by partnering with the live streaming pornographic site CamSoda. After organizing the acclaimed Camsoda Ledgends event in 2018, the streaming company teamed up with Full Metal Dojo and launch the Fight Circus events.

On August 22, 2020, Camsoda and FMD launched Fight Circus Vol. 1 was a free show held in Bangkok and the Full Metal Dojo's first event since COVID-19 lockdowns in Thailand. The Fight Circus events could only be viewed on Camsoda's website. All proceeds were said to go to the COVID-19 relief fund. The event gathered of lot of attention among fight fans around the world.

The vice-president of CamSoda Daryn Parker, extended an offer to Tito Ortiz for US$100,000 to fight in a 2-on-1 match at Fight Circus Vol. 3 in Thailand. The proposal was sent only a fews days after Ortiz resigned from the Huntington Beach City Council. Parker published the proposal in a public letter to Ortiz published online. The company also offered former professional basketball player Nate Robinson to compete in Fight Circus and get US$200,000 for every fighter he faces in one night, after losing a second-round knockout loss to YouTuber Jake Paul. Fight Circus 3 was postponed from April 9 to November 5 due to COVID-19 outbreak.

In 2022, the CEO Jon Nutt fought an "MMA Symmetrical match" against the Thai team fighters "Bank" and "No Money". One of the Thai fighters went for a takedown while the other was attacking. Nutt was able to toss one of his opponent on the floor and landed a soccer kick to the face, but eventually submitted via rear-naked choke. The event also featured Indian Leg Wrestling, inter-gender Muaythai, siamese twins kickboxing and the"Bob Sapp Challenge" where Sapp played with dwarfs and called out Buakaw Banchamek for a fight. One of the only non-gimmick match of the event was a Lethwei fight between Gligor Stojanov and Kristof Kirsch, which ended in a spectacular knockout win for Stojanov.

On June 30, 2023, WBC Heavyweight champion Tyson Fury made a guest appearance at Fight Circus 7 at to celebrate the CEO Jon Nutt's birthday in Thailand. Fury sang American Pie in the ring. Fury was pictured partying in the ring with cosplaying dwarfs after throwing a birthday cake in Jon Nutt's face.

On April 2, 2023, former UFC light heavyweight champion Quinton Jackson was teamed up with fellow PRIDE veteran Bob Sapp in a siamese boxing match for the main event of Fight Circus 6: The Rise Or Fall Of Sloppy Balboa held at Illuzion Nightclub in Phuket. The "Siamese Twins" matchup was said to be an homage to Thailand's Siamese Twins born in 1811. They faced the promotion's CEO Jon Nutt and Bangtao Muay Thai’s strength and conditioning coach Andrew Wood known as "Woody". The two pairs they were joined with a tailored oversized t-shirt. In the first round, Nutt was dropped by a heavy body shot and dragged his teammate down with him. Jackson also attacked the referee. The fight continued and Jackson and Sapp ultimately won by third-round TKO. The event was presented on FITE. In 2024, Quinton Jackson appeared on The Joe Rogan Experience MMA Show #159 and described his match to Joe Rogan as the "most fun he's ever had in a ring". The event also saw former World Lethwei Championship Champion Souris Manfredi fought two smaller fighters named Indica and Sativa also known as RUN THC.

On September 29, 2024, for the main event of Fight Circus 8, PRIDE Fighting Championships veteran Charles Bennet competed in 2-on-1 MMA match against Thai fighters "Bank" and "No Money" in Phuket, Thailand. The Thai fighters won the match by submitting Bennet via rear naked choke.

In 2024, Former UFC fighter Matt Brown acted as a referee for "The Ultimate Dick Kicking Championships", a crotch kicking competition organized Fight Circus in Thailand. Some fans compared the event to Dana White's Power Slap. Brown reposted the footage of the event to his X account and seemingly endorsed groin-kicking over slapfighting by adding the caption: "So much for power slap! "This shit is next level!"

On January 12, 2025, Matt Brown acted as the partner of UFC Hall of Famer Mark Coleman when he returned to the ring and competed at Fight Circus 12 in Phuket, Thailand in a "wheelchair boxing match" against the CEO of the promotion Jon Nutt. Coleman was being pushed around the ring, as both fighters were strapped into a wheelchair and were pushed by their cornermen. At the end of the fight, both men stood up from their wheelchairs and Coleman knocked out Nutt at the last second. Brown also competed at the event and fought "Blobtang" in a Muaythai match.

==== Fighting disciplines ====
Partial list of types of matches Full Metal Dojo and Fight Circus have held.

- crotch-kicking
- Siamese twins boxing
- Inter-gender grappling
- Kicking-only bouts
- Wheelchair boxing match
- 2 versus 1 fights
- Blindfolded Muay Thai
- dwarf fighting
- Telephone booth fighting
- Indian leg wrestling
- MMA
- Kickboxing
- Muay Thai
- Lethwei
- Bareknuckle boxing
- Submission grappling

== Events ==
#	Event	Date	Venue	Location
32	Full Metal Dojo 31: Fight Circus 11 Brawla in Kuala	December 29, 2024	RAGE Fight Academy	Kuala Lumpur, Malaysia
31	Full Metal Dojo 30: Fight Circus 12 Studio 69	November 17, 2024	Junkyard Theater	Phuket, Thailand
30	Full Metal Dojo 29: Fight Circus 10 The Matt Brown Magical Mystery Tour	September 10, 2024	Junkyard Theater	Phuket, Thailand
29	Full Meta Dojo X - 10 Year Anniversary	June 30, 2024	The Circus Studios	Bangkok, Thailand
28	Full Metal Dojo 27: Fight Circus 9 Total Sellouts	March 23, 2023	Junkyard Theater	Phuket, Thailand
27	Full Metal Dojo 26: Fight Circus 8 Running Man the Musical	September 29, 2023	Junkyard Theater	Phuket, Thailand
26	Full Metal Dojo 25: Fight Circus 7 Lock Stock and Two Smoking Sausages	June 30, 2023	Junkyard Theater	Phuket, Thailand
25	Full Metal Dojo 24: Fight Circus 6 The Rise or Fall of Sloppy Balboa	March 31, 2023	Illusion Nightclub	Phuket, Thailand
24	Full Metal Dojo 23: Fight Circus 5 Hanukkah Gone Wrongukkah	December 17, 2022	Illusion Nightclub	Phuket, Thailand
23	Full Metal Dojo 22: Fight Circus Vol. 4 Send Lawyers, Guns & Money	November 5, 2022	Illusion Nightclub	Phuket, Thailand
22	Full Metal Dojo 21: Fight Circus Vol. 3 Fisting for Dollars	March 6, 2021	Fairtex Training Center	Pattaya, Thailand
21	Full Metal Dojo: Bare Knuckle Kingdom	January 23, 2021	The Sea Galleri	Phuket, Thailand
20	Full Metal Dojo 20: Fight Circus Vol. 2	November 21, 2020	Insanity Nightclub	Bangkok, Thailand
19	Full Metal Dojo 19: Fight Circus Vol. 1	August 22, 2020	Insanity Nightclub	Bangkok, Thailand
18	Full Metal Dojo 18: Bangkoxploitation	November 30, 2019	Insanity Nightclub	Bangkok, Thailand
17	Full Metal Dojo 17: Mad Nutt's Fury SOI	August 31, 2019	Insanity Nightclub	Bangkok, Thailand
16	Full Metal Dojo 16: Big Trouble in Little Bangkok	May 17, 2018	Insanity Nightclub	Bangkok, Thailand
15	Full Metal Dojo - Kumite 3000: Asia Prizefighting Association	December 8, 2017	Insanity Nightclub	Bangkok, Thailand
14	Full Metal Dojo 15: Come Out to Play	November 4, 2017	Insanity Nightclub	Bangkok, Thailand
13	Full Metal Dojo 14: Bigger, Badder, Blacker, Madder	July 1, 2017	Insanity Nightclub	Bangkok, Thailand
12	Full Metal Dojo 13: Concrete Jungle Where Dreams Are Made Of	February 25, 2017	Insanity Nightclub	Bangkok, Thailand
11	Full Metal Dojo 12: The 37th Chamber	September 10, 2016	Insanity Nightclub	Bangkok, Thailand
10	Full Metal Dojo 11: Sweep All the Legs	June 14, 2016	Insanity Nightclub	Bangkok, Thailand
9	Full Metal Dojo 10: To Live and Die in Bangkok	March 19, 2016	Insanity Nightclub	Bangkok, Thailand
8	Full Metal Dojo 8: Return of the Mack	January 10, 2016	Seduction Discotheque	Phuket, Thailand
7	Full Metal Dojo 7: Full Metal Massacre	October 31, 2015	Insanity Nightclub	Bangkok, Thailand
6	Full Metal Dojo 6: For Those About To Rock	August 22, 2015	Insanity Nightclub	Bangkok, Thailand
5	Full Metal Dojo 5: Made in Thailand	May 9, 2015	Live House BKK	Bangkok, Thailand
4	Full Metal Dojo 4: Once Upon a Time in Bangkok	February 21, 2015	Live House BKK	Bangkok, Thailand
3	Full Metal Dojo 3: No Sleep 'Til Bangkok	November 22, 2014	Live House BKK	Bangkok, Thailand
2	Full Metal Dojo 2: Protect Your Neck	August 23, 2014	Seduction Nightclub	Phuket, Thailand
1	Full Metal Dojo 1	June 7, 2014	Seduction Discotheque	Phuket, Thailand

Full Metal Dojo Fights, Fight Cards, Videos, Pictures, Events and more

== Notable competitors ==
- Mark Coleman
- Matt Brown
- Tharoth Sam
- Carlos Prates
- Jomhod Kiatadisak
- Charles Bennett
- Loma Lookboonmee
- Amir Aliakbari
- Suwanan Boonsorn
- Kritsada Kongsrichai

== See also ==
- ONE Championship
- Rizin Fighting Federation
- Road Fighting Championship
- Kunlun Fight
- Lethwei
