= Wacko (disambiguation) =

Wacko is a 1983 arcade game by Bally Midway.

Wacko may also refer to:

- Wacko (behavior)
- Wacko (film), a 1982 American horror film parody
- Wacko (TV series), a short-lived 1977 American variety television series
- A villain in the Disney animated series Darkwing Duck
- A member of the American rap group UTP
- Rob "Wacko" Hunter, a former member of the British band Raven
- A song on the album Carpe Diem

== See also ==
- Whack-O!, a British television sitcom
- Soap Plant / Wacko, a novelty store in Los Angeles
- Wacky (disambiguation)
- Wakko, one of the three siblings in the American animated television series Animaniacs
- Psycho (disambiguation)
