= Melvin Yeoh =

Malaysian mixed martial arts fighter

- Born: Yeoh Chian Yik; 5 January 1981 (age 45); Perlis, Malaysia
- Other names: Overkill
- Nationality: Malaysian
- Height: 5 ft 7 in (1.70 m)
- Weight: 145 lb (66 kg; 10 st 5 lb)
- Division: Featherweight (145 lb)
- Fighting out of: Johor Bahru, Malaysia
- Team: Ultimate MMA
- Years active: 2003 - present

Mixed martial arts record
- Total: 10
- Wins: 7
- By knockout: 3
- By submission: 3
- By decision: 1
- Losses: 3
- By knockout: 2
- By submission: 0
- By decision: 1

Other information
- Mixed martial arts record from Sherdog

Melvin Yeoh (born 5 January 1981) is a Malaysian mixed martial artist and Muay Thai champion. As of April 2012 he is the most successful mixed martial artist in Malaysian history with a professional record of 6–1.

He began training in Taekwondo in Perlis at the age of 13 and later took up Muay Thai. As a teenager he was encouraged to participate in martial arts by his grandparents because he got in a lot of fights at school. Yeoh's work as a school teacher took him from Perlis to Johor Bahru where he founded the first MMA camp in the region in 2006.

== MMA career ==
Yeoh decided to enter Mayhem 2 which was organised as the promotion now known as Malaysian Fighting Championship in 2012. Despite only being 145 lbs he beat Sam Chan and Raymond Tiew in the quarter finals and semi finals, Tiew would later go on to fight for ONE Championship. In the final he took on Kazbek Shalbassov but lost in controversial circumstances after the referee gave Shalbassov time to recover from an illegal knee which video replays proved to be legal.

Yeoh recovered from the setback to win his next four fights. On 10 December 2011 he stopped Malaysian Muhammad Taufiq Hashim with punches in the first round of their fight at Malaysian Fighting Championship 3.

On 10 March 2012 he stopped another Malaysian, Mohd Zakhir, with a head kick 27 seconds into the first round of their fight at Malaysian Fighting Championship 4. This stoppage is proven to be controversial since his opponent can still fight and its only a knockdown.

Just two weeks later, on 24 March 2012, Yeoh defeated Singapore's Zulkarnain Mohammad by triangle choke in the first round of their fight at Ultimate MMA - Ultimate Fight Night 7. On 14 April 2012 he took on another fighter from Singapore, Mamat Sparko, at Gods FC. Yeoh weighed 20 lbs less than his opponent but was able to win by triangle choke for the second successive fight in a performance which led some to speculation that he was ready to fight at a higher level.

In April 2012 he was strongly linked with ONE Championship and tipped to appear on their 23 June event at Stadium Negara in Kuala Lumpur something which Yeoh said would be a 'dream'. Yeoh was one of four fighters selected for the ONE FC Malaysian Featherweight Tournament and he defeated Raymond Tiew for the second time in his semi final matchup at ONE Fighting Championship: Return of Warriors which was held at Putra Indoor Stadium on 23 June and will face Jian Kai Chee in the final.

Chee ultimately had to back out of the final due to injuries and was replaced by the eventual winner A.J. Lias Mansor who defeated Yeoh on 15 November 2013 at ONE Fighting Championship: Warrior Spirit, to become the inaugural Malaysian National Featherweight Champion.

Melvin Yeoh last seen in One Championship cage in October 2015 when he lost to Saiful Merican. Occasionally competed in some grappling and Muay Thai small show he been focus on building his promotion such as Ultimate Beatdown, Subzero and Johor Jiujitsu open. He also focus on training upcoming prospect such as Jihin "Shadowcat" Radzuan who debuted in One Championship March 9, 2018 and showed promising results by round 2 Triangle choke. Later in July 2018 and Dec 2018, Melvin best prospect make another 2 statements by defeating Indonesian top female contender Jenny Huang, a former title contender.

== Mixed martial arts record ==
Professional record breakdown
10 matches	7 wins	3 losses
By knockout	3	2
By submission	3	0
By decision	1	1

Res.	Record	Opponent	Method	Event	Date	Round	Time	Location	Notes
Loss	7–3	Saiful Merican	TKO (punches)	ONE: Tigers of Asia	October 9, 2015	2	1:10	Kuala Lumpur, Malaysia	
Loss	7–2	A.J. Lias Mansor	Decision (unanimous)	ONE FC: Warrior Spirit	15 November 2013	3	5:00	Kuala Lumpur, Malaysia	ONE Malaysia Featherweight Tournament Final.
Win	7–1	Raymond Tiew	Submission (triangle choke)	ONE FC: Return of the Warriors	February 2, 2013	2	3:29	Kuala Lumpur, Malaysia	ONE Malaysia Featherweight Tournament Semifinal.
Win	6–1	Mamat Sparko	Submission (triangle choke)	Gods FC 1	April 14, 2012	1	3:53	Kuala Lumpur, Malaysia	
Win	5–1	Zulkarnain Mohammad	Submission (triangle choke)	Ultimate Beatdown 7	March 24, 2012	1	3:06	Johor Bahru, Malaysia	
Win	4–1	Mohd Zakhir	TKO (head kick)	Malaysian FC 4	March 10, 2012	1	0:27	Kuala Lumpur, Malaysia	
Win	3–1	Muhammad Taufiq Hashim	TKO (punches)	Malaysian FC 3	December 10, 2011	1	1:49	Kuala Lumpur, Malaysia	
Loss	2–1	Kazbek Shalbassov	TKO (punches)	Malaysian FC: Mayhem 2	September 3, 2011	1	2:46	Kuala Lumpur, Malaysia	
Win	2–0	Raymond Tiew	TKO (punches)	Malaysian FC: Mayhem 2	September 3, 2011	2	1:40	Kuala Lumpur, Malaysia	
Win	1–0	Sam Chan	Decision	Malaysian FC: Mayhem 2	September 3, 2011	2	5:00	Kuala Lumpur, Malaysia	
