= 2011 in ONE Championship =

Mixed martial arts events

ONE Fighting Championship: Champion vs. Champion
- The poster for ONE Fighting Championship: Champion vs. Champion
- Promotion: ONE Fighting Championship
- Date: September 3, 2011
- Venue: Singapore Indoor Stadium
- City: Kallang, Singapore
- Attendance: 6,789

Event chronology
—	ONE Fighting Championship: Champion vs. Champion	ONE Fighting Championship: Battle of Heroes

ONE Fighting Championship: Champion vs. Champion (also known as ONE FC 1) was the inaugural mixed martial arts event held by ONE Championship. The event took place on September 3, 2011 at the 12,000 capacity Singapore Indoor Stadium in Kallang, Singapore. It is the first and only event held by the organization in 2011.

== Background ==
ONE Championship instituted Pride Fighting Championships rules combined with Nevada's unified rules; this allowed for soccer kicks, head stomps, knees on the ground, and permitting the use of elbows.

The event was broadcast on domestic TV in Singapore by MediaCorp Channel 5. The event also streamed live on Sherdog to all countries except Singapore.

This led multiple media sources to describe ONE Fighting Championship: Champion vs. Champion as "the biggest event in Asian mixed martial arts history" and to speculate that the TV audience might be the biggest ever for a mixed martial arts event.

On 17 August 2011 it was announced that A Sol Kwon, a Korean fighter on a six fight win streak, would be replacing the injured Ole Laursen in the main event against Eduard Folayang.

== Results ==
Main card
Weight class				Method	Round	Time	Notes
Lightweight	Eduard Folayang	def.	A Sol Kwon	Decision (unanimous)	3	5:00
Welterweight	Yoshiyuki Yoshida	def.	Phil Baroni	Decision (unanimous)	3	5:00
Featherweight	Eric Kelly	def.	Mitch Chilson	Submission (rear-naked choke)	1	3:10
Welterweight	Gregor Gracie	def.	Seok Mo Kim	Decision (unanimous)	3	5:00
Lightweight	Zorobabel Moreira	def.	Andy Wang	TKO (punches)	2	1:59
Preliminary card
Catchweight (160 lb)	Eddie Ng	def.	Yuan Chun Bo	TKO (punches)	1	0:45
Flyweight	Radeem Rahman	def.	Susovan Ghosh	TKO (punches)	1	3:18
Lightweight	Vuyisile Colossa	def.	Ma Xing Yu	TKO (strikes)	1	0:49
Bantamweight	Yodsanan Sityodtong	def.	Daniel Mashamaite	TKO (flying knee)	2	0:14
Bantamweight	Leandro Issa	def.	Soo Chul Kim	Decision (unanimous)	3	5:00

== See also ==
- List of ONE Championship champions
- List of ONE Championship events
