= Alain Ngalani =

Kickboxer and Muay Thai fighter

- Born: Pierre Alain Ngalani; July 7, 1975 (age 51); Yaoundé, Cameroon
- Other names: The Panther
- Nationality: Cameroonian; Hongkonger
- Height: 5 ft 11 in (180 cm)
- Weight: 110 kg (240 lb; 17 st)
- Division: Heavyweight; Cruiserweight (Note: ONE Championship refers to their 225 lb weight class as light heavyweight, but per the Association of Boxing Commissions in the United States, 225 lb is considered cruiserweight.)
- Reach: 73 in (185 cm)
- Style: Kickboxing, Muay Thai, Sanda
- Fighting out of: Hong Kong
- Team: Team Impakt
- Rank: Black belt in Kyokushin Karate; Black belt in Shotokan Karate; 2nd degree black belt in Koshiki Karate; Black belt in Judo; Black prajied in Muay Thai; Purple belt in Brazilian Jiu-Jitsu

Kickboxing record
- Total: 37
- Wins: 25
- By knockout: 23
- Losses: 8
- Draws: 1
- No contests: 3

Mixed martial arts record
- Total: 12
- Wins: 4
- By knockout: 3
- By decision: 1
- Losses: 6
- By knockout: 5
- By submission: 1
- No contests: 2

Other information
- Mixed martial arts record from Sherdog

Alain Ngalani (born July 7, 1975) is a Cameroonian and Hongkonger retired mixed martial artist and Muay Thai kickboxer who most recently fought for ONE Championship, where he competed in the Heavyweight division.

== Biography and career ==
Ngalani started learning Judo at the age of six, following his brothers. He started showing ability early, winning back-to-back junior tournaments in Cameroon and all over Africa. He was influenced by his mother, who loved the sport and wanted her boys to learn discipline and focus their energy positively. As a youth he cut down his judo training in order to study other styles such as Karate (Shotokan, Koshiki and Kyokushin), Boxing, Savate, Sanda and Muay Thai. Later he picked up other disciplines like Brazilian Jiu-Jitsu and Wrestling in preparation for fighting in MMA competitions. In addition to martial arts, he worked as a bodyguard for VIPs and high-profile personalities in Côte d'Ivoire before immigrating to Hong Kong in 2001.

=== Move to Hong Kong and Planet Battle ===
While based in Hong Kong, he travelled to Thailand, Japan and Mainland China to win numerous titles. When the "Planet Battle" promotion was formed in 2008, Ngalani became a regular fighter for the organization. After defeating Michael McDonald at Planet Battle I in June 2008, he went on to compete in the 8-man tournament at Planet Battle II in November 2008. Ngalani, who was ordered by doctors not to fight due to a severely injured right knee, lost to Brian Douwes via knockout with a knee in the quarter-final. He then bounced back by knocking out Eduardo Maiorino at Planet Battle III on June 6, 2009. At Planet Battle IV on October 7, 2009, Ngalani defeated Bob Sapp via decision, and then on March 26, 2010, he stopped Carter Williams with low kicks at Planet Battle V.

Ngalani could not continue after getting knocked down with an alleged punch to the back of his head against Dževad Poturak in 2011. The match was for the IKA Super Heavyweight World Championship and was considered a no contest.

=== ONE Championship ===
Alain Ngalani briefly moved back to kickboxing, competing in the ONE Super Series, where he lost to Tarik Khbabez by third-round technical knockout at ONE Championship: Pinnacle of Power on June 23, 2018. On October 6, 2018 at ONE Championship: Kingdom of Heroes, his fight with Andre Meunier ended in a no contest when he was on the receiving end of an accidental low blow.

== Mixed martial arts career ==
=== ONE Championship ===
==== 2013 ====
On September 13, 2013, Ngalani switched from striking to mixed martial arts, debuting with a 31-second spinning heel kick KO win over Mahmoud Hassan at ONE FC: Champions & Warriors.

However, he went without a win in his next three contests as he lost to Paul Cheng by verbal submission at ONE FC: Moment of Truth on December 6, 2013.

==== 2014 ====
On May 30, 2014, Ngalani faced Chi Lewis-Parry at ONE FC: Honor and Glory. The fight ended in a no contest when Lewis-Parry landed an inadvertent groin strike. He lost their rematch at ONE FC: War of Dragons by first-round knockout via ground-and-pound elbows.

==== 2015 ====
Ngalani got back to his winning ways with a first-round TKO win over Igor Subora at ONE Championship: Pride of Lions on November 13, 2015.

==== 2016 ====
On August 13, 2016, he was stopped by Alexandre Machado in the second round at ONE Championship: Heroes of the World.

==== 2017 ====
He broke the ONE record for fastest heavyweight knockout when he stopped BJJ and judo black belt Hideki Sekine in 11 seconds at ONE Championship: Total Victory on September 16, 2017.

On November 3, 2017, Ngalani faced Aung La Nsang in the ONE Championship's first-ever openweight superfight at ONE Championship: Hero's Dream, where he lost by submission via guillotine choke.

==== 2018 ====
On March 24, 2018, he recorded his first decision win over Ariunbold Tur-Ochir at ONE Championship: Iron Will.

==== 2019 ====
Ngalani returned to mixed martial arts on March 8, 2019, where he lost to Mauro Cerilli by first-round TKO at ONE Championship: Reign of Valor.

==== 2020 ====
On April 28, 2020, news surfaced that Ngalani was scheduled to face Vitor Belfort, who was making his ONE debut. Their bout never materialized as Belfort parted ways with ONE in June 2021 without ever having fought for the promotion.

==== 2021 ====
On January 12, 2021, ONE Championship announced that Ngalani would instead face Senegalese wrestling champion Oumar Kane in the latter's promotional debut at ONE Championship: Unbreakable 2 on January 29, 2021. Ngalani lost by first-round technical knockout.

Ngalani faced ONE promotional newcomer Thomas Narmo at ONE Championship: Battleground 2 on August 13, 2021. After a groin kick committed by Ngalani, Narmo was unable to continue and the bout was declared a no contest.

== Titles ==
- International Kickboxing Association
  - 2011 IKA Super Heavyweight World Champion
- Planet Battle
  - 2010 Planet Battle Heavyweight World Champion
  - 2009 Planet Battle Heavyweight World Champion
- World Professional Muaythai Federation
  - 2004 WPMF Muay Thai Heavyweight World Champion, Thailand
- King's Cup
  - 2004 King's Birthday Cup runner-up, Thailand
- World Muaythai Council
  - 2004 Hong Kong Muay Thai Heavyweight Champion (WMC)
  - 2002 Muay Thai Heavyweight Champion, Surat Thani & Ko Samui, Thailand (WMC)
  - Khru in Muay Thai (WMC)
- World Koshiki Karatedo Federation
  - 2003 Japan Cup Silver Medal – Heavyweight (WKKF)
  - 2002–03 Hong Kong Koshiki Karate Heavyweight Champion (WKKF)
- Others
  - 1998–2001 Heavyweight Kickboxing Champion of Africa (FIKO, UFABA)
  - 2006 Kuoshu All-Style Martial Arts World Champion
  - Black belt in Kyokushin Karate
  - 2003 King of Sanda, Guangdong Province, China
  - Gyoshi 2nd dan black belt in Koshiki Karate

== Kickboxing record(Incomplete) ==
Kickboxing record
25 wins (23 (T)KOs), 8 losses, 1 draw, 3 no contests
| Date | Result | Opponent | Event | Location | Method | Round | Time |
| 2018-10-06 | No contest | (Australia) Andre Meunier | ONE Championship: Kingdom of Heroes | Bangkok, Thailand | No contest | 2 | 0:30 |
| 2018-06-23 | Loss | (Morocco) Tarik Khbabez | ONE Championship: Pinnacle of Power | Beijing, China | TKO (punches) | 3 | 1:45 |
| 2011-07-30 | No contest | (Bosnia and Herzegovina) Dževad Poturak | Elite Kickboxing | Las Vegas, Nevada, USA | No contest (punch after knockdown) | 1 | 2:06 |
For IKA Super Heavyweight World Championship.
| 2010-06-11 | No Contest | (Russia) Ramazan Ramazanov | Planet Battle VI | Wan Chai, Hong Kong | No contest (ring invasion) | 2 | |
| 2010-03-26 | Win | (United States) Carter Williams | Planet Battle V | Hong Kong | TKO (low kicks) | 2 | |
| 2009-10-07 | Win | (United States) Bob Sapp | Planet Battle IV | Wan Chai, Hong Kong | Decision | 3 | 3:00 |
| 2009-06-06 | Win | (Brazil) Eduardo Maiorino | Planet Battle III | Hong Kong | KO (punches) | 1 | |
| 2008-11-25 | Loss | (Netherlands) Brian Douwes | Planet Battle II | Hong Kong | KO (knee) | 3 | |
Tournament quarter-final.
| 2008-06-25 | Win | (Canada) Michael McDonald | Planet Battle I | Hong Kong | Decision | 3 | 3:00 |
| 2004-04-24 | Win | (Czech Republic) Marek Olafski | Muay Thai World Championship | Bangkok, Thailand | TKO (low kicks) | 1 | |
Wins the WPMF Heavyweight World Championship.
Legend: Win Loss Draw/no contest Notes

== Mixed martial arts record ==
Professional record breakdown
| 12 matches | 4 wins | 6 losses |
| By knockout | 3 | 5 |
| By submission | 0 | 1 |
| By decision | 1 | 0 |
| No contests | 2 | |

| Res. | Record | Opponent | Method | Event | Date | Round | Time | Location | Notes |
|---|---|---|---|---|---|---|---|---|---|
| NC | 4–6 (2) | Thomas Narmo | No contest (accidental groin kick) | ONE: Battleground 2 | August 13, 2021 | 2 | 4:05 | Kallang, Singapore | Accidental groin kick rendered Narmo unable to continue. |
| Loss | 4–6 (1) | Oumar Kane | TKO (punches) | ONE: Unbreakable 2 | January 29, 2021 | 1 | 4:32 | Kallang, Singapore | |
| Loss | 4–5 (1) | Mauro Cerilli | TKO (knees) | ONE: Reign of Valor | March 8, 2019 | 1 | 2:30 | Yangon, Myanmar | |
| Win | 4–4 (1) | Tur-Ochir Ariunbold | Decision (split) | ONE: Iron Will | March 24, 2018 | 3 | 5:00 | Bangkok, Thailand | |
| Loss | 3–4 (1) | Aung La Nsang | Submission (guillotine choke) | ONE: Hero's Dream | November 3, 2017 | 1 | 4:31 | Yangon, Myanmar | Openweight bout. |
| Win | 3–3 (1) | Hideki Sekine | KO (punch) | ONE: Total Victory | September 16, 2017 | 1 | 0:11 | Jakarta, Indonesia | |
| Loss | 2–3 (1) | Alexandre Machado | TKO (submission to punches) | ONE: Heroes of the World | August 13, 2016 | 2 | 0:21 | Macau, SAR, China | |
| Win | 2–2 (1) | Igor Subora | TKO (punches) | ONE: Pride of Lions | November 13, 2015 | 1 | 1:09 | Kallang, Singapore | |
| Loss | 1–2 (1) | Chi Lewis-Parry | KO (elbows) | ONE FC: War of Dragons | July 11, 2014 | 1 | 4:11 | Taipei, Taiwan | |
| NC | 1–1 (1) | Chi Lewis-Parry | No contest (accidental knee to groin) | ONE FC: Honor and Glory | May 30, 2014 | 1 | N/A | Kallang, Singapore | Accidental knee to the groin rendered Ngalani unable to continue. |
| Loss | 1–1 | Paul Cheng | TKO (submission to strikes) | ONE FC: Moment of Truth | December 6, 2013 | 1 | 4:54 | Pasay, Philippines | |
| Win | 1–0 | Mahmoud Hassan | KO (spinning heel kick) | ONE FC: Champions & Warriors | September 13, 2013 | 1 | 0:31 | Jakarta, Indonesia | Heavyweight debut. |
