= Eduardo Maiorino =

Brazilian kickboxer and mixed martial arts fighter

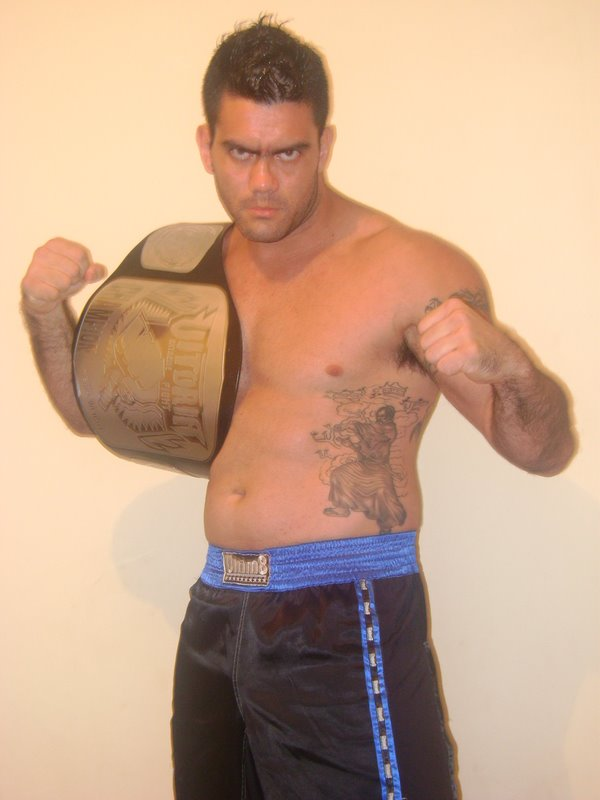
- Born: Eduardo Maiorino de Morais; August 16, 1979; Campo Grande, Brazil
- Died: December 23, 2012 (aged 33); Campo Grande, Brazil
- Other names: Morpheus
- Height: 1.88 m (6 ft 2 in)
- Weight: 92.5 kg (204 lb; 14.57 st)
- Division: Heavyweight; Light Heavyweight
- Style: Kickboxing
- Stance: Orthodox
- Team: Shock Combat
- Trainer: Nilson Pulgatti; Ubiratan Neves
- Rank: Prajioud Black (Kru 12th Khan) in Muay Thai; Prajioud Silver (Arjarn 14th Khan) in Muay Thai; 3rd Degree Black Belt in Kickboxing; Black Belt in Karate; Purple belt in Brazilian Jiu-Jitsu
- Years active: 1999–2012

Kickboxing record
- Total: 102
- Wins: 53
- By knockout: 21
- Losses: 39
- By knockout: 12
- Draws: 10

Mixed martial arts record
- Total: 12
- Wins: 3
- By knockout: 2
- By decision: 1
- Losses: 9
- By knockout: 6
- By submission: 3

Other information
- Website: eduardomaiorino.blogspot.com
- Mixed martial arts record from Sherdog
- Last updated on: January 16, 2010

Eduardo "Morpheus" Maiorino (August 16, 1979 – December 23, 2012) was a Brazilian professional kickboxer and mixed martial artist. He was a three time Brazilian Heavyweight Muay Thai Champion, the K-1 Brazil 2004 Tournament finalist and champion, and a World Muay Thai Association (WMA) Super Heavyweight World Champion.

== Biography and career ==
Eduardo Maiorino de Morais was born in Campo Grande, Mato Grosso do Sul, Brazil and died December 23, 2012, after a heart attack. He was 33.

== Titles ==
- 2011 WKBC World Champion (Heavyweight division)
- 2010 2nd place in World Championship WMA (World Muay Thai Association) Hangzhou, China
- 2010 10th place in world rankings in WBC Muay Thai (super cruiserweight division)
- 2009 3rd in rankings IMC International Muay Thai Council
- 2009 World Champion (Super Heavyweight division) World Kickboxing League
- 2009 World Heavyweight Champ (WKL)
- 2008 State champion in Jiu-Jitsu
- 2007 Brazilian Muay thai champion
- 2007 Brazilian Champion of Demolition Fight III Muay Thai
- 2006 Brazilian Vale Tudo tournament champion
- Three times Brazilian Muay Thai Champion C.B.M.T "Brazilian Muay Thai Confederation" (2005, 2004, 2003)
- 2004 Vitória Extreme Fight MMA Grand Prix Champion
- 2004 K-1 Brazil Challenge Champion
- 2004 WKN Brazilian Muay Thai Champion
- 2004 Champion of K-1 Brazil Grand Prix in Goiânia-GO
- 2003 3rd World M-1 Kickboxing GP in Venice-ITA
- 2003 2nd place in K-1 Brazil Grand Prix (São Paulo-SP)
- 2003–05 Brazilian Muay Thai Confederation Champion
- 2003 K-1 World Grand Prix Preliminary Brazil runner up
- 2002 Centro-Oeste Boxing champion

== Mixed martial arts record ==
Professional record breakdown
12 matches	3 wins	9 losses
By knockout	2	6
By submission	0	3
By decision	1	0

Res.	Record	Opponent	Method	Event	Date	Round	Time	Location	Notes
Loss	3–9	(Brazil) Vinicius Lima	KO (punch)	Hard Fight Championship	November 10, 2012	1	0:24	Cuiabá, Mato Grosso, Brazil	
Loss	3–8	(Brazil) Geronimo dos Santos	KO (punches)	MF – Max Fight 13	May 13, 2012	1	0:50	São Paulo, Brazil	
Win	3–7	(United States) Gerald Hill	KO (punches)	Sugar Creek Showdown 5	May 14, 2011	1	0:31	Hinton, Oklahoma	
Loss	2–7	(Brazil) Rodrigo Gripp de Sousa	Submission (guillotine choke)	Open Fight	August 4, 2007	1	N/A	Brazil	
Loss	2–6	(Brazil) Junior dos Santos	Submission (guillotine choke)	Minotauro Fights 5	December 9, 2006	1	0:50	São Paulo, Brazil	
Loss	2–5	(Brazil) Assuério Silva	TKO (punches)	Show Fight 5	November 9, 2006	1	N/A	São Paulo, Brazil	
Loss	2–4	(Brazil) Rafael Cavalcante	TKO (strikes)	Pantanal Combat	February 10, 2006	1	N/A	Brazil	
Loss	2–3	(Brazil) Edson Claas Vieira	TKO (submission to punches)	Meca World Vale Tudo 12	July 9, 2005	1	0:42	Rio de Janeiro, Brazil	
Loss	2–2	(Italy) Alessio Sakara	KO (punches)	Real Fight 1	July 30, 2004	1	0:30	Rio de Janeiro, Brazil	
Win	2–1	(Brazil) Danilo Pereira	Decision (split)	Vitoria Extreme Fighting 1	May 29, 2004	N/A	N/A	Vitoria, Brazil	
Win	1–1	(Brazil) Chico Melo	KO (strikes)	Vitoria Extreme Fighting 1	May 29, 2004	3	N/A	Vitoria, Brazil	
Loss	0–1	(Brazil) Claudineney Kozan	Submission (guillotine choke)	K-1 Brazil – New Stars	November 27, 2003	1	0:55	Curitiba, Brazil	

== Kickboxing record (Incomplete) ==
Kickboxing record (Incomplete)
Date	Result	Opponent	Event	Location	Method	Round	Time
2012-12-01	Loss	(Belarus) Igor Bugaenko	Tatneft Cup 2013 2nd selection 1/8 final (+91 kg)	Kazan, Russia	KO	1	N/A
2012-09-01	Loss	(Australia) Steve Bonner	N/A	Perth, Western Australia	TKO	1	N/A
For vacant WBC Muaythai Super Heavyweight Intercontinental title.
2010-12-19	Loss	(United States) Steve Banks	N/A	Hainan Island, China	Decision	5	3:00
For vacant WBC Muaythai Super Heavyweight Intercontinental title.
2010-11-06	Loss	(Australia) Steve McKinnon	Immortality 3	Australia	TKO	2	N/A
For McKinnon's WBC Muaythai Super Cruiserweight World title.
2010-05-22	Loss	(Australia) Steve Bonner	World Muay Thai Championship	Zhangzhou, China	KO	4	N/A
For WMA (World Muay Thai Association) Super Heavyweight World Title.
2010-01-16	Loss	(Russia) Ramazan Ramazanov	Thailand vs Challenger Series, Royal Paragon Hall	Bangkok, Thailand	KO	1	N/A
2009-06-20	Loss	(New Zealand) Andrew Peck	New Zealand vs. Brazil	Auckland, New Zealand	N/A	N/A	N/A
2009-06-06	Loss	(Hong Kong) Alain Ngalani	Planet Battle III	Hong Kong	KO	1	N/A
2009-05-30	Loss	(Sudan) Faisal Zakaria	The Challenger 2009	Macau, China	KO	N/A	N/A
2008-06-26	Loss	(Bosnia and Herzegovina) Dževad Poturak	Planet Battle: Where Champions Collide	Hong Kong	KO	1	1:09
2007-05-25	Loss	(United States) Duke Roufus	Colosseum 5	N/A	TKO	2	0:56
2007-03-10	Loss	(Brazil) Vitor Miranda	Floripa Fight 3	Florianópolis, Brazil	KO	1	N/A
2006-09-23	Loss	(Brazil) Vitor Miranda	Demolition IV	São Paulo, Brazil	KO	2	1:16
2006-04-08	Win	(Brazil) Montanha Silva	Demolition Fight 3	São Paulo, Brazil	Decision	3	3:00
2005-10-22	Win	(Brazil) Cleber Adao	K-1 Brazil Grand Prix 2005 in São Paulo, Quarter Finals	Serra Negra, Brazil	Decision	3	3:00
Maiorino withdrew from tournament due to injury.
2004-10-30	Win	(Brazil) Vitor Miranda	K-1 Brazil 2004 Challenge, Final	Goiânia, Brazil	Decision	3	3:00
Wins K-1 Brazil 2004 Challenge Title.
2004-10-30	Win	(Brazil) Dierlei de Souza Rodrigues	K-1 Brazil 2004 Challenge, Semi Finals	Goiânia, Brazil	KO	3	1:04
2004-10-30	Win	(Brazil) Joabe Silva de Jesus	K-1 Brazil 2004 Challenge, Quarter Finals	Goiânia, Brazil	TKO	3	0:32
2003-11-27	Loss	(Brazil) Claudinei Litaver Kozan	K-1 MMA in Brazil				
2003-7-19	Loss	(United States) Mike Vieira	N/A	Sanibel Island, USA	KO	2	2:00
2003-05-02	Loss	(United States) Rick Roufus	K-1 World Grand Prix 2003 in Las Vegas Quarter-final	Las Vegas, USA	TKO	1	2:54
2003-02-23	Loss	(Brazil) Jefferson Silva	K-1 World Grand Prix 2003 Preliminary Brazil, Final	São Paulo, Brazil	Decision	3	3:00
For K-1 Brazil Grand Prix 2003 in São Paulo Title.
2003-02-23	Win	(Brazil) Luis dos Santos	K-1 World Grand Prix 2003 Preliminary Brazil, Semi Finals	São Paulo, Brazil	Decision	3	3:00
2003-02-23	Win	(Brazil) Laerte Rezende Jr.	K-1 World Grand Prix 2003 Preliminary Brazil, Quarter Finals	São Paulo, Brazil	TKO	2	N/A

== See also ==
- List of male kickboxers
- List of K-1 events
