= Leandro Issa =

Brazilian martial artist

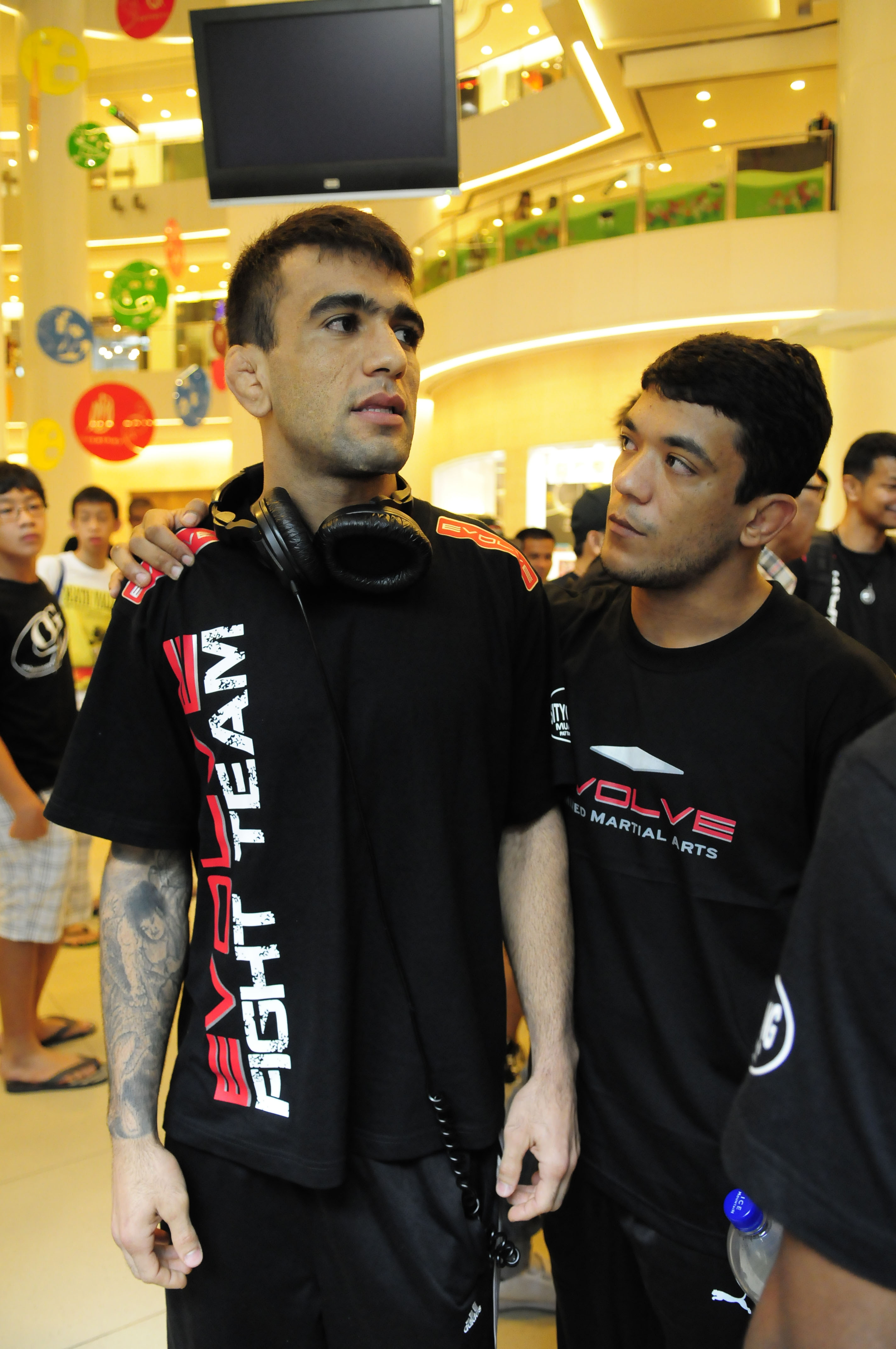
- Issa (left) in 2011
- Born: September 19, 1983 (age 43)
- Other names: Brodinho
- Nationality: Brazilian
- Height: 5 ft 7 in (1.70 m)
- Weight: 136 lb (62 kg; 9 st 10 lb)
- Division: Featherweight (145 lb); Bantamweight (135 lb)
- Reach: 69.0 in (175 cm)
- Fighting out of: Singapore
- Team: Evolve Mixed Martial Arts
- Rank: 3rd degree black belt in Brazilian Jiu-Jitsu
- Years active: 2006 - present

Mixed martial arts record
- Total: 26
- Wins: 17
- By knockout: 2
- By submission: 11
- By decision: 4
- Losses: 9
- By knockout: 4
- By submission: 2
- By decision: 3

Other information
- Mixed martial arts record from Sherdog

Leandro Issa (born September 19, 1983) is a Brazilian mixed martial artist. He is a black belt in Brazilian Jiu Jitsu and has won numerous BJJ competitions and tournaments including the Mundials and the Brazilian national championships. He is a member of the Evolve MMA team and is based in Singapore.

== Mixed martial arts career ==
=== Fighting in Brazil ===
Issa made his professional MMA debut in October 2006 submitting Eduardo Felipe in the second round. He was handed the first loss of his MMA career in May 2007 when he was stopped in the third round by Japanese fighter Takafumi Otsuka. In total Issa fought five times in Brazil during this period, winning three fights and losing two.

=== War Gods ===
Issa's first fight outside of Brazil was at War Gods in California. He defeated Ralph Lopez by rear naked choke in the opening round.

=== Art of War ===
Issa moved to Singapore to join the Evolve MMA fight team in January 2009. His first fight in Asia was for the Art of War Fighting Championship promotion in China. He submitted Korean fighter Yeong Gwang Choi with a triangle choke in the first round.

=== Martial Combat ===
In 2010 Issa signed with Martial Combat and he fought three times for this promotion, winning every single fight by way of first round submission. His win over Gui Quan Lin at Martial Combat 11 was his fifth consecutive first round submission win and he has finished all five fights with a different submission.

In 2011 Issa decided he would drop down to the bantamweight division.

=== ONE Fighting Championship ===
On July 15, 2011, it was announced that Issa had signed with One Fighting Championship. On July 18 it was announced that Issa would be facing unbeaten Korean Soo Chul Kim at ONE Fighting Championship: Champion vs. Champion at the Singapore Indoor Stadium on September 3.

This fight was Issa's first as a bantamweight. Although Soo Chul Kil had a record of 4–1, Issa has been described as the toughest opponent he has ever faced. Issa won the fight via unanimous decision.

Issa's next fight was against Japanese veteran Masakazu Imanari at ONE Fighting Championship: Destiny of Warriors in Kuala Lumpur in June 2012. He won by unanimous decision.

=== Ultimate Fighting Championship ===
In November 2013, it was announced that Issa had signed a contract with the UFC. His debut took place on January 4, 2014, at UFC Fight Night: Saffiedine vs. Lim against Russell Doane. He lost the fight via technical submission in the second round.

Issa next fought Jumabieke Tuerxun at The Ultimate Fighter 19 Finale on July 6, 2014. He won the fight via submission due to an armbar in the third round. His efforts earned him his first Fight of the Night and Performance of the Night bonuses.

Issa fought Ulka Sasaki on December 20, 2014, at UFC Fight Night 58. He won the fight in the second round via submission.

Issa next faced Iuri Alcântara on August 1, 2015, at UFC 190. He lost the fight by unanimous decision.

Issa next faced Taylor Lapilus on September 3, 2016, at UFC Fight Night 93. He lost the fight by unanimous decision and was subsequently released from the promotion.

== Championships and achievements ==
=== Mixed martial arts ===
- Ultimate Fighting Championship
  - Fight of the Night (One time)
  - Performance of the Night (One time)
  - UFC.com Awards
    - 2014: Ranked #8 Submission of the Year vs. Jumabieke Tuerxun

== Mixed martial arts record ==
Professional record breakdown
26 matches	17 wins	9 losses
By knockout	2	4
By submission	11	2
By decision	4	3

Res.	Record	Opponent	Method	Event	Date	Round	Time	Location	Notes
Loss	17–9	Artem Belakh	Decision (unanimous)	ONE 162	October 21, 2022	3	5:00	Kuala Lumpur, Malaysia	
Loss	17–8	Daichi Takenaka	TKO (punches)	ONE: Dawn of Heroes	August 2, 2019	3	1:39	Pasay, Philippines	
Win	17–7	Fu Changxin	Submission (armbar)	ONE: Roots of Honor	April 12, 2019	1	3:03	Pasay, Philippines	Catchweight (150 lb) bout.
Loss	16–7	Muin Gafurov	KO (punch)	ONE: Kingdom of Heroes	October 6, 2018	1	2:24	Bangkok, Thailand	
Win	16–6	Roman Alvarez	Submission (arm-triangle choke)	ONE: Spirit of a Warrior	June 29, 2018	1	1:26	Yangon, Myanmar	Return to Featherweight.
Win	15–6	Kim Dae-hwan	Decision (unanimous)	ONE: Immortal Pursuit	November 24, 2017	3	5:00	Kallang, Singapore	
Win	14–6	Toni Tauru	TKO (punches)	ONE: Kings and Conquerors	August 5, 2017	2	1:36	Macau, SAR, China	
Loss	13–6	Taylor Lapilus	Decision (unanimous)	UFC Fight Night: Arlovski vs. Barnett	September 3, 2016	3	5:00	Hamburg, Germany	
Loss	13–5	Iuri Alcântara	Decision (unanimous)	UFC 190	August 1, 2015	3	5:00	Rio de Janeiro, Brazil	
Win	13–4	Ulka Sasaki	Submission (neck crank)	UFC Fight Night: Machida vs. Dollaway	December 20, 2014	2	4:13	Barueri, Brazil	
Win	12–4	Jumabieke Tuerxun	Submission (armbar)	The Ultimate Fighter: Team Edgar vs. Team Penn Finale	July 6, 2014	3	3:49	Las Vegas, Nevada, United States	Issa was deducted one point in round 2 due to grabbing the fence. Performance of the Night. Fight of the Night.
Loss	11–4	Russell Doane	Technical Submission (triangle choke)	UFC Fight Night: Saffiedine vs. Lim	January 4, 2014	2	4:59	Marina Bay, Singapore	
Win	11–3	Yusup Saadulaev	Decision (unanimous)	ONE FC: Kings and Champions	April 5, 2013	3	5:00	Kallang, Singapore	
Loss	10–3	Soo Chul Kim	TKO (punches)	ONE FC: Rise of Kings	October 6, 2012	2	0:15	Kallang, Singapore	For the inaugural ONE Bantamweight Championship.
Win	10–2	Masakazu Imanari	Decision (unanimous)	ONE FC: Destiny of Warriors	June 23, 2012	3	5:00	Kuala Lumpur, Malaysia	
Win	9–2	Soo Chul Kim	Decision (unanimous)	ONE FC: Champion vs. Champion	September 3, 2011	3	5:00	Kallang, Singapore	Return to Bantamweight.
Win	8–2	Liu Guoqian	Submission (arm-triangle choke)	Martial Combat 11	October 15, 2010	1	1:08	Sentosa, Singapore	
Win	7–2	Ramsey Dewey	Submission (kimura)	Martial Combat 5	July 14, 2010	1	N/A	Sentosa, Singapore	
Win	6–2	Jiang Longyun	Submission (armbar)	Martial Combat 1	May 12, 2010	1	3:03	Sentosa, Singapore	
Win	5–2	Choi Yeong-gwang	Submission (triangle choke)	Art of War 15	November 28, 2009	1	1:27	Beijing, China	Featherweight debut.
Win	4–2	Ralph Lopez	Submission (rear-naked choke)	War Gods	December 9, 2008	1	3:58	Salinas, California, United States	
Loss	3–2	Hudson Rocha	Submission (guillotine choke)	Rio FC 1	February 28, 2008	1	0:45	Rio de Janeiro, Brazil	
Win	3–1	Tony Marcos	TKO (punches)	Gladiator Combat Arena	September 24, 2007	N/A	N/A	Rio de Janeiro, Brazil	
Loss	2–1	Takafumi Otsuka	TKO (punches)	Fury FC 3	May 19, 2007	3	N/A	São Paulo, Brazil	
Win	2–0	Leonardo Porto	Submission (triangle choke)	Segundo Muay Thai Festival	September 27, 2006	1	1:25	Niterói, Brazil	
Win	1–0	Eduardo Felipe	Submission (choke)	Top Fighter MMA 2	October 25, 2006	2	N/A	Rio de Janeiro, Brazil	Bantamweight debut.

== See also ==
- List of male mixed martial artists
