= Tharoth Sam =

Cambodian actress and mixed martial arts fighter

- Born: Tharoth Oum Sam; August 11, 1990 (age 36); Site Two Refugee Camp, Thailand
- Nationality: Cambodian
- Height: 157 cm (5 ft 2 in)
- Weight: 48 kg (106 lb; 7 st 8 lb)
- Division: Atomweight
- Style: Bokator
- Fighting out of: Cambodia
- Team: Cambodian Top Team

Mixed martial arts record
- Total: 6
- Wins: 4
- By submission: 4
- Losses: 2
- By knockout: 1
- By decision: 1
- Draws: 0

Other information
- Mixed martial arts record from Sherdog

Tharoth Sam is a Cambodian actress and mixed martial artist specializing in the Khmer fighting style of Bokator. She has previously competed in ONE Championship.

== Biography ==
Sam grew up in a refugee camp on the border of Cambodia and Thailand. Her father, Oum Dara, was a violinist and songwriter. When Sam was 18 years old, she started studying Bokator, a traditional Khmer fighting style, and she entered in her first martial arts fight in 2014. She was coached by Chan Reach Kun Khmer, a Cambodian-American mixed martial arts fighter, and San Kim Sean.

In 2017, she appeared in the films Jailbreak and First They Killed My Father. She also appeared in Loung Preah Sdach Korn, a historical film.

== Fighting career ==
As a fighter, she is known by the nickname Little Frog.

After 18 months absence from the cage, Sam competed in Thailand at Full Metal Dojo 14 and won via rear naked chokes against Thailand’s Surarak Kamla.

== Mixed martial arts record ==
Professional record breakdown
| 6 matches | 4 wins | 2 losses |
| By knockout | 0 | 1 |
| By submission | 4 | 0 |
| By decision | 0 | 1 |

| Res. | Record | Opponent | Method | Event | Date | Round | Time | Location | Notes |
|---|---|---|---|---|---|---|---|---|---|
| Win | 4–2 | Kaewjai Prachumwong | Submission (Armbar) | Full Metal Dojo 15 | 4 November 2017 | 3 | 4:47 | Bangkok, Thailand | |
| Win | 3–2 | Surarak Kamla | Submission (Rear-Naked Choke) | Full Metal Dojo 14 | 1 July 2017 | 3 | 4:26 | Bangkok, Thailand | |
| Loss | 2–2 | Jeet Toshi | Decision (unanimous) | ONE Championship: Kingdom of Khmer | 5 December 2015 | 3 | 5:00 | Phnom Penh, Cambodia | |
| Loss | 2–1 | Jujeath Nagaowa | TKO (Punches and Elbows) | ONE FC 23: Warrior's Way | 5 December 2014 | 2 | 3:34 | Manila, Philippines | |
| Win | 2–0 | Vy Srey Khouch | Technical Submission (Armbar) | ONE FC 20 - Rise of the Kingdom | 12 September 2014 | 1 | 2:36 | Phnom Penh, Cambodia | |
| Win | 1–0 | Srey Moa Theoun | Submission (Armbar) | Bayon Khmer MMA - BKM | 14 June 2014 | 1 | 3:12 | Phnom Penh, Cambodia | |

== Filmography ==
| Year | Title | Role |
|---|---|---|
| 2025 | The Sentry | Short Film |
| 2024 | The Lockdown | Jeeja Aromdee the Women's Champion |
| 2024 | The Night Curse of Reatrei | Pisey |
| 2023 | Killing Time Violently | |
| 2022 | Shotgun Wedding | Rat-Face |
| 2017 | Jailbreak | Tharoth |
| 2017 | First They Killed My Father | child soldier leader |
| 2017 | Loung Preah Sdach Korn | |
