= 2012 in ONE Championship =

Mixed martial arts events

Information
- First date: February 11, 2012

Events
- Total events: 5

Fights
- Total fights: 50
- Title fights: 2

Chronology
2011 in ONE	2012 in ONE Championship	2013 in ONE

The year 2012 was the 2nd year in the history of the ONE Championship, a mixed martial arts promotion based in Singapore.

== List of events ==
#	Event	Date	Venue	City	Country
5	ONE FC: Rise of Kings	October 6, 2012	Singapore Indoor Stadium	Kallang	Singapore
4	ONE FC: Pride of a Nation	August 31, 2012	Smart Araneta Coliseum	Quezon City	Philippines
4	ONE FC: Destiny of Warriors	June 23, 2012	Stadium Negara	Kuala Lumpur	Malaysia
3	ONE FC: War of the Lions	March 31, 2012	Singapore Indoor Stadium	Kallang	Singapore
2	ONE FC: Battle of Heroes	February 11, 2012	The BritAma Arena	North Jakarta	Indonesia

== ONE Fighting Championship: Battle of Heroes ==
ONE Fighting Championship: Battle of Heroes
- Promotion: ONE Fighting Championship
- Date: February 11, 2012
- Venue: The BritAma Arena
- City: North Jakarta, Indonesia
- Attendance: 4,371

Event chronology
ONE Fighting Championship: Champion vs. Champion	ONE Fighting Championship: Battle of Heroes	ONE Fighting Championship: War of the Lions

ONE Fighting Championship: Battle of Heroes (also known as ONE FC 2) was a mixed martial arts event held by ONE Championship. The event took place on February 11, 2012 at The BritAma Arena in North Jakarta, Indonesia and was broadcast by MNC International.

Background

This was the first event ONE held outside of Singapore.

Results

Main Card
Weight class				Method	Round	Time	Notes
Lightweight	Felipe Enomoto	def.	Ole Laursen	Submission (rear-naked choke)	2	3:49
Featherweight	Bae Young Kwon	def.	Honorio Banario	Submission (rear-naked choke)	1	0:56
Welterweight	Rustam Khabilov	def.	Rodrigo Ribeiro	Decision (unanimous)	3	5:00
Bantamweight	Gustavo Falciroli	def.	Soo Chul Kim	Submission (rear-naked choke)	1	1:12
Heavyweight	Rolles Gracie	def.	Bob Sapp	TKO (submission to punches)	1	1:18
Preliminary Card
Featherweight	Victorio Senduk	def.	Raymond Tiew	TKO (knee injury)	1	4:02
Flyweight	Geje Eustaquio	def.	Alex Silva	Decision (unanimous)	3	5:00
Bantamweight	Irshaad Sayed	def.	Jessie Rafols	KO (punch to the body)	1	1:49
Lightweight	Peter Davis	def.	Ngabdi Mulyadi	Submission (triangle choke)	3	3:54
Welterweight	Zuli Silawanto	def.	Agus Nanang	TKO (punches)	1	0:47

== ONE Fighting Championship: War of the Lions ==
ONE Fighting Championship: War of the Lions
- Promotion: ONE Fighting Championship
- Date: March 31, 2012
- Venue: Singapore Indoor Stadium
- City: Kallang, Singapore
- Attendance: 7,714

Event chronology
ONE Fighting Championship: Battle of Heroes	ONE Fighting Championship: War of the Lions	ONE Fighting Championship: Destiny of Warriors

ONE Fighting Championship: War of the Lions (also known as ONE FC 3) was a mixed martial arts event held by ONE Championship. The event took place on March 31, 2012 at the Singapore Indoor Stadium in Kallang, Singapore.

Background

The event marked the debut of Nicole Chua, believed to be Singapore's first ever professional female mixed martial artist.

Results

Main card
Weight class				Method	Round	Time	Notes
Lightweight	Zorobabel Moreira	def.	Felipe Enomoto	Submission (armbar)	3	1:04
Featherweight	Tatsuya Kawajiri	def.	Donald Sanchez	Submission (triangle choke)	1	3:27
Lightweight	Ole Laursen	def.	Eduard Folayang	Decision (split)	3	5:00
Welterweight	Fabricio Monteiro	def.	Yuya Shirai	Decision (unanimous)	3	5:00
Catchweight (195 lb)	Melvin Manhoef	vs.	Yoshiyuki Nakanishi	NC (both fighters cut by clash of legs)	1	2:08	(Note: Accidental clash of legs rendered both fighters unable to continue.)
Lightweight	Eddie Ng	def.	Jian Kai Chee	TKO (punches)	1	0:43
Preliminary Card
Bantamweight	Masakazu Imanari	def.	Kevin Belingon	Submission (reverse heel hook)	1	1:18
Women's Flyweight	Nicole Chua	def.	Jeet Toshi	Submission (rear-naked choke)	1	2:07
Lightweight	lKim Hock Quek	def.	Major Overall	Technical Submission (rear-naked choke)	1	3:18
Bantamweight	Jiang Longyun	def.	Yodsanan Sityodtong	Technical Submission (rear-naked choke)	1	3:28
Lightweight	Danny van Bergen	def.	Richie Whitson	Submission (armbar)	1	1:19

== ONE Fighting Championship: Destiny of Warriors ==
ONE Fighting Championship: Destiny of Warriors
- Promotion: ONE Fighting Championship
- Date: June 23, 2012
- Venue: Stadium Negara
- City: Kuala Lumpur, Malaysia
- Attendance: 8,153

Event chronology
ONE Fighting Championship: War of the Lions	ONE Fighting Championship: Destiny of Warriors	ONE Fighting Championship: Pride of a Nation

ONE Fighting Championship: Destiny of Warriors (also known as ONE FC 4) is a mixed martial arts event held by ONE Championship. The event took place on June 23, 2012 at the 10,200 capacity Stadium Negara in Kuala Lumpur, Malaysia.

Background

Renato 'Babalu' Sobral made his debut for ONE at this event. Last time Sobral fought was against Dan Henderson at Strikeforce: Henderson vs. Babalu II in late 2010.

Phil Baroni was expected to face Roger Huerta at this event, but due to losing a fight just three weeks before the event via TKO, ONE opted to remove him from the fight card rather than await on the Colorado Office of Boxing to confirm Baroni is on a medical suspension.

Results

Main card
Weight class				Method	Round	Time	Notes
Cruiserweight	Renato Sobral	def.	Tatsuya Mizuno	Submission (armbar)	1	0:31
Welterweight	Zorobabel Moreira	def.	Roger Huerta	KO (soccer kick)	2	3:53
Bantamweight	Leandro Issa	def.	Masakazu Imanari	Decision (unanimous)	3	5:00
Welterweight	Adam Shahir Kayoom	def.	Gregor Gracie	Decision (unanimous)	3	5:00
Featherweight	Eric Kelly	def.	Kwon Bae-young	Decision (unanimous)	3	5:00
Preliminary card
Lightweight	Arnaud Lepont	def.	Brian Choi	Submission (rear-naked choke)	3	1:38
Featherweight	Mitch Chilson	def.	A.J. Lias Mansor	Submission (rear-naked choke)	1	1:39
Welterweight	Marcos Escobar	def.	Rodrigo Praxedes	Submission (brabo choke)	3	1:05
Lightweight	Peter Davis	def.	Kim Hock Quek	TKO (knees and punches)	1	0:55

== ONE Fighting Championship: Pride of a Nation ==
ONE Fighting Championship: Pride of a Nation
- Promotion: ONE Fighting Championship
- Date: August 31, 2012
- Venue: Smart Araneta Coliseum
- City: Quezon City, Philippines
- Attendance: 12,523

Event chronology
ONE Fighting Championship: Destiny of Warriors	ONE Fighting Championship: Pride of a Nation	ONE Fighting Championship: Rise of Kings

ONE Fighting Championship: Pride of a Nation (also known as ONE FC 5) took place on August 31, 2012 at the Smart Araneta Coliseum in Quezon City, Philippines. It was ONE's first event in the Philippines.

Background

Held in conjunction with the URCC, Pride of the Nation has been described as the biggest event in the history of Filipino MMA as 12,523 fans attended. The event featured three former UFC champions: Tim Sylvia, Andrei Arlovski and Jens Pulver.

There were two controversial incidents at this event which involved the use of soccer kicks. Because of this, ONE will now allow their fighters to use them at any point in a fight from ONE FC: Rise of Kings. One incident was during the bout between Andrei Arlovski and Tim Sylvia. Arlovski knocked Sylvia down and then threw soccer kicks at his head. Everyone thought the referee had stopped the fight; he actually called time because he didn't call "open attack". When it was decided after a five-minute rest period for Sylvia that he could not continue, the fight resulted in a No Contest. The other incident occurred during the fight between Shannon Wiratchai and Mitch Chilson, in which Wiratchai won. However, after a thorough review of the match days after the event, ONE officials decided that Wiratchai landed an illegal leg kick to a grounded Chilson in the second round and referee Moritaka Oshiro incorrectly called an end to the fight as he determined at that point that Chilson could not properly defend himself. The win for Wiratchai was reversed and the fight officially ruled as a No Contest.

Results

Main card
Weight class				Method	Round	Time	Notes
Bantamweight	Bibiano Fernandes	def.	Gustavo Falciroli	Decision (unanimous)	3	5:00
Lightweight	Eduard Folayang	def.	Felipe Enomoto	Decision (unanimous)	3	5:00
Heavyweight	Andrei Arlovski	vs.	Tim Sylvia	No Contest (illegal soccer kick)	2	4:46
Featherweight	Eric Kelly	def.	Jens Pulver	TKO (body kick and punches)	2	1:46
Preliminary Card
Heavyweight	Rolles Gracie	def.	Tony Bonello	Submission (rear naked choke)	3	1:33
Welterweight	Jung Hwan Cha	def.	Igor Gracie	TKO (punches and elbows)	3	1:03
Bantamweight	Soo Chul Kim	def.	Kevin Belingon	Decision (unanimous)	3	5:00
Catchweight	Gregor Gracie	def.	Nicholas Mann	Submission (armbar)	1	3:28
Welterweight	Phil Baroni	def.	Rodrigo Ribeiro	TKO (soccer kicks and punches)	1	1:00
Featherweight	Mitch Chilson	vs.	Shannon Wiratchai	No Contest (illegal punch and kick)	2	2:03
Featherweight	Honorio Banario	def.	Andrew Benibe	TKO (body kicks and punches)	3	3:47

== ONE Fighting Championship: Rise of Kings ==
ONE Fighting Championship: Rise of Kings
- Promotion: ONE Fighting Championship
- Date: October 6, 2012
- Venue: Singapore Indoor Stadium
- City: Kallang, Singapore
- Attendance: 9,232

Event chronology
ONE Fighting Championship: Pride of a Nation	ONE Fighting Championship: Rise of Kings	ONE Fighting Championship: Return of Warriors

ONE Fighting Championship: Rise of Kings (also known as ONE FC 6) was a mixed martial arts event held by ONE Championship. The event took place on October 6, 2012 at the 12,000 capacity Singapore Indoor Stadium in Kallang, Singapore.

Background

The event was supposed to crown three ONE champions in the Lightweight, Featherweight and Bantamweight divisions, But due to Pay-Per-View time constraints, ONE has opted to move the Featherweight title fight later in the year.

This event also held the first bouts for the ONE Bantamweight Grand Prix.

ONE made its PPV debut via iN DEMAND, Avail-TVN, DirecTV and Dish.

Following two controversial decisions at ONE FC: Pride of a Nation, ONE will now fully adopt the use of soccer kicks at any point in a fight from this event onwards.

Results

Main card
Weight class				Method	Round	Time	Notes
Lightweight	Shinya Aoki	def.	Arnaud Lepont	Technical Submission (triangle choke)	1	1:25
Lightweight	Kotetsu Boku	def.	Zorobabel Moreira	TKO (punches)	3	1:02	(Note: For the inaugural ONE Lightweight World Championship.)
Bantamweight	Kim Soo-chul	def.	Leandro Issa	TKO (punches)	2	0:15	(Note: For the inaugural ONE Bantamweight World Championship.)
Middleweight	Melvin Manhoef	def.	Ryo Kawamura	KO (punch)	1	4:40
Bantamweight	Jens Pulver	def.	Zhao Ya Fei	Technical Decision (unanimous)	3	0:58	(Note: ONE Bantamweight Grand Prix Quarterfinal. An accidental groin kick which rendered Pulver unable to continue.)
Bantamweight	Masakatsu Ueda	def.	Song Min-jong	Decision (unanimous)	3	5:00	(Note: ONE Bantamweight Grand Prix Quarterfinal.)
Bantamweight	Kevin Belingon	def.	Yusup Saadulaev	TKO (punches)	1	3:18	(Note: ONE Bantamweight Grand Prix Quarterfinal.)
Preliminary Card
Flyweight	Gianni Subba	def.	Bruce Loh	KO (soccer kick)	1	0:33
Featherweight	Mitch Chilson	def.	Ngabdi Mulyadi	TKO (punches)	2	1:05
