= Wacky (disambiguation) =

Wacky is another word for eccentric behavior, sometimes in an amusing manner.

Wacky and similar may also refer to:

- Wacky Bennett (1900–1979), the nickname of Canadian politician W. A. C. Bennett
- Mr Wacky (1964–2005), Jamaican dancehall performer also known as Bolge
- WAQY, a Springfield, Massachusetts FM radio station once known as "Wacky 102"
- WAYE, a Birmingham, Alabama AM radio station formerly known as "Wacky 1220" (as WAQY)
- Wacky Weasel, a villainous character in the Disney animated series Bonkers

== See also ==
- Wackies, an American independent record label
- "Captain Wacky", a nickname for Paul Keating (born 1944), former Prime Minister of Australia
- Wacko (disambiguation)
