= Kumite 1 League =

Indian martial arts promotion

- Industry: Mixed martial arts League
- Founded: 2017
- Founder: Mohamedali Budhwani
- Headquarters: Mumbai, India
- Key people: Mohamedali Budhwani Chairman & MD
- Parent: Toyam Industries Limited
- Website: kumite1league.in

The Kumite 1 League (K1L) is a mixed martial arts league and martial arts promotion, based in Mumbai, India. The league is supported by the World Kickboxing Network and backed by Toyam Industries. Kumite 1 League debuted its inaugural season on 28 September 2018 in Mumbai and Mike Tyson was appointed as the brand ambassador of the event.

== History ==
Kumite 1 League was founded by Mohamedali Budhwani in 2017, with the purpose to promote and popularise the sport of Mixed Martial Arts in India.

== Events ==
Kumite 1 League 1.0 was the introductory event held at the National Sports Club of India (NSCI) Dome, Mumbai on 28 September 2018, in the presence of brand ambassador Mike Tyson. The event was attended by international sports and entertainment personalities from India. The event was broadcast in India on Sony ESPN, Sony ESPN HD and Sony Liv and it was beamed across more than 80 countries.

Bappi Lahiri composed a special jingle for Mike Tyson during his visit to India. Music composer Asif Panjwani created the theme music for Kumite 1 League. The MMA champion Nelson Paes won the Kumite 1 League's championship. The inaugural season was won by Nelson Paes.

== Kumite 1 Warrior Hunt ==
Toyam Industries Limited has launched Kumite 1 Warrior Hunt, which is India's first-ever MMA Talent Hunt & Sports Reality Show streaming as a Web Series on MX Player. Kumite 1 Warrior Hunt is seeking two of the top mixed martial arts (MMA) one male and one female champion athlete.

== See also ==
- Mixed martial arts
