= Nobutatsu Suzuki =

Japanese martial artist

- Born: September 16, 1977 (age 49); Chofu, Tokyo, Japan
- Nationality: Japanese
- Height: 5 ft 8 in (1.73 m)
- Weight: 170 lb (77 kg; 12 st 2 lb)
- Division: Light Heavyweight; Middleweight; Welterweight; Lightweight
- Fighting out of: Tokyo, Japan
- Team: Bushinjuku
- Rank: Black belt in Kyokushin
- Years active: 2005–2014; 2017

Mixed martial arts record
- Total: 16
- Wins: 11
- By knockout: 10
- By decision: 1
- Losses: 3
- By knockout: 2
- By submission: 1
- Draws: 2

Other information
- Mixed martial arts record from Sherdog

Nobutatsu Suzuki (鈴木 信達, Suzuki Nobutatsu; born September 16, 1977) is a Japanese professional mixed martial artist who last competed in the Lightweight division of ONE FC. A professional MMA competitor since 2005, he has also competed for Vale Tudo Japan. He was the inaugural ONE FC Welterweight Champion.

== Background ==
Suzuki is from Tokyo, Japan and began training in Kyokushin Karate when he was 15 years old after losing a street fight. He went on to become a five-time Heavyweight Champion, competing in various tournaments and championships. Unusually, despite being one of the top Welterweights in Asia he also has a full-time job as a legal assistant.

== Mixed martial arts career ==
=== Early career ===
Suzuki began his professional career when he was 27 years old in 2005 against Sojiro Orui, the fight went to a draw because the time ran out. Suzuki then won his next three fights by knockout before having another draw this time against Petras Markevicius. Suzuki went on to win six more fights all ending by knockout, He was 9-0-2 before being defeated for the first time against UFC vet Keita Nakamura at Vale Tudo Japan 2012.

=== ONE Championship ===
After the loss Suzuki was picked up by ONE Championship, his first fight was against UFC veteran Phil Baroni, Suzuki won the fight via TKO after Baroni broke his ankle.

Suzuki was to get a shot at the inaugural ONE FC Welterweight Championship against Adam Kayoom at ONE Fighting Championship: Warrior Spirit. However, on November 11, 2013, ONE FC officials announced that Adam Kayoom was injured, and was going to be replaced by Vitor Pinto. However, Pinto was not medically cleared and the bout was cancelled.

Suzuki faced Brock Larson for the inaugural ONE FC Welterweight Championship on March 14, 2014 at ONE FC: War of Nations. He won the fight via unanimous decision.

In his first title defense, Suzuki faced Ben Askren on August 29, 2014 at ONE FC: Reign of Champions. He lost the fight and title due to strikes in the first round. Suzuki returned on August 18, 2017, at ONE: Quest for Greatness. Nearly 3 years after his last fight and faced Ev Ting. He lost the fight Via TKO in the first round.

== Championships and accomplishments ==
- ONE Championship
  - ONE FC Welterweight Championship (One time; first)

== Mixed martial arts record ==
Professional record breakdown
14 matches	11 wins	3 losses
By knockout	10	2
By submission	0	1
By decision	1	0

Res.	Record	Opponent	Method	Event	Date	Round	Time	Location	Notes
Loss	11−3−2	Ev Ting	TKO (punches)	ONE: Quest for Greatness	August 18, 2017	1	3:29	Kuala Lumpur, Malaysia	Lightweight debut.
Loss	11−2−2	Ben Askren	TKO (punches)	ONE FC: Reign of Champions	August 29, 2014	1	1:24	Dubai, UAE	Lost the ONE FC Welterweight Championship.
Win	11−1−2	Brock Larson	Decision (unanimous)	ONE FC: War of Nations	March 14, 2014	5	5:00	Kuala Lumpur, Malaysia	Won the ONE FC Welterweight Championship.
Win	10−1−2	Phil Baroni	TKO (punches)	ONE FC: Rise to Power	May 31, 2013	1	4:17	Pasay, National Capital Region, Philippines	Welterweight debut.
Loss	9−1−2	Keita Nakamura	Submission (rear-naked choke)	Vale Tudo Japan 2012	December 24, 2012	1	2:09	Tokyo, Japan	Catchweight (80 kg) bout.
Win	9−0−2	Austin Judge	KO (knee to the body)	Zst: Zst 30	November 23, 2011	1	1:37	Tokyo, Japan	Middleweight debut.
Win	8−0−2	Maurice Shelton	KO (punch)	Zst: Eighth Anniversary	November 23, 2010	2	4:29	Tokyo, Japan	
Win	7−0−2	Uh Jin Jeon	KO (knees)	Zst: Battle Hazard 4	July 3, 2010	1	2:16	Tokyo, Japan	
Win	6−0−2	Osami Shibuya	KO (knees)	Zst: Zst 22	November 23, 2009	2	4:03	Tokyo, Japan	
Win	5−0−2	Yojiro Uchimura	KO (knees)	Zst: Battle Hazard 3	August 24, 2008	2	1:53	Tokyo, Japan	
Win	4−0−2	Kestutis Smirnovas	TKO (doctor stoppage)	Zst: Zst 13	June 10, 2007	1	5:00	Tokyo, Japan	
Draw	3−0−2	Petras Markevicius	Draw (time limit)	Zst: Zst 11	November 23, 2006	2	5:00	Tokyo, Japan	
Win	3−0−1	Kenji Nagai	KO (punches)	Zst: Zst 10	September 10, 2006	1	1:37	Tokyo, Japan	
Win	2−0−1	Kazuhiro Hanada	KO (punch)	Zst: Zst 9	February 18, 2006	1	4:01	Tokyo, Japan	
Win	1−0−1	Yusuke Takahashi	KO (punch)	Zst: Swat! 3	October 23, 2005	2	1:19	Tokyo, Japan	
Draw	0−0−1	Sojiro Orui	Draw (time limit)	Zst: Swat! 2	July 24, 2005	2	5:00	Tokyo, Japan	
