= 2021 in ONE Championship =

Mixed martial arts events

Information
- First date: January 22, 2021
- Last date: December 18, 2021

Events
- Total events: 39
- One Championship: 24
- Road To Events: 15

Fights
- Total fights: 274
- Title fights: 27

The year 2021 was the 11th year in the history of the ONE Championship, a mixed martial arts, kickboxing and Muay Thai promotion based in Singapore.

== ONE Championship 2021 Awards ==
The following fighters won the ONE Championship year-end awards for 2021

- ONE Championship MMA Fighter of the Year 2021: Ok Rae Yoon
- ONE Championship MMA Female Fighter of the Year 2021: Stamp Fairtex
- ONE Championship MMA Fight for the Year: Dagi Arslanaliev vs. Timofey Nastyukhin
- ONE Championship MMA Knockout of the Year 2021: Adriano Moraes against Demetrious Johnson (ONE 132: ONE on TNT 1)
- ONE Championship Submission of the Year 2021: Shinya Aoki against James Nakashima (ONE 126: Unbreakable)
- ONE Super Series Fighter of the Year 2021: Superbon Banchamek
- ONE Super Series Fight of the Year 2021: Rodtang Jitmuangnon vs. Danial Williams (ONE 132: ONE on TNT 1)
- ONE Super Series Knockout of the Year 2021: Superbon Banchamek against Giorgio Petrosyan (ONE 144: First Strike)
- ONE Super Series Female Fighter of the Year 2021: Janet Todd

== The Apprentice: ONE Championship Edition ==
Chatri Sityodtong announces a ONE Championship edition of The Apprentice who will feature 16 contestants who will be competing for a $250,000 prize and a one-year contract to work for ONE (as well as becoming the chief of staff).

=== Guest Athletes ===
- (Canada) Angela Lee
- (United States) Ben Askren
- (United States) Brandon Vera
- (United States) Demetrious Johnson
- (Canada) Georges St-Pierre
- (Brazil) Renzo Gracie
- (United States) Rich Franklin
- (India) Ritu Phogat
- (United States) Sage Northcutt
- (China) Xiong Jing Nan

== List of events ==
=== ONE Championship ===
ONE Championship
| No. | Event | Event Date | Air date | Venue | Location |
|---|---|---|---|---|---|
| 1 | ONE Championship 126: Unbreakable | January 22, 2021 | January 22, 2021 | Singapore Indoor Stadium | Singapore |
| 2 | ONE Championship 127: Unbreakable 2 | January 22, 2021 | January 29, 2021 | Singapore Indoor Stadium | Singapore |
| 3 | ONE Championship 128: Unbreakable 3 | January 22, 2021 | February 5, 2021 | Singapore Indoor Stadium | Singapore |
| 4 | ONE Championship 129: Fists Of Fury | February 26, 2021 | February 26, 2021 | Singapore Indoor Stadium | Singapore |
| 5 | ONE Championship 130: Fists Of Fury 2 | February 26, 2021 | March 5, 2021 | Singapore Indoor Stadium | Singapore |
| 6 | ONE Championship 131: Fists Of Fury 3 | February 26, 2021 | March 19, 2021 | Singapore Indoor Stadium | Singapore |
| 7 | ONE Championship 136: Dangal | April 28, 2021 | May 15, 2021 | Singapore Indoor Stadium | Singapore |
| 8 | ONE Championship 137: Full Blast | April 28, 2021 | May 28, 2021 | Singapore Indoor Stadium | Singapore |
| 9 | ONE Championship 138: Full Blast 2 | April 28, 2021 | June 11, 2021 | Singapore Indoor Stadium | Singapore |
| 10 | ONE Championship 139: Battleground | July 30, 2021 | July 30, 2021 | Singapore Indoor Stadium | Singapore |
| 11 | ONE Championship 140: Battleground 2 | July 30, 2021 | August 13, 2021 | Singapore Indoor Stadium | Singapore |
| 12 | ONE Championship 141: Battleground 3 | July 30, 2021 | August 27, 2021 | Singapore Indoor Stadium | Singapore |
| 13 | ONE Championship 142: Empower | September 3, 2021 | | Singapore Indoor Stadium | Singapore |
| 14 | ONE Championship 143: Revolution | September 24, 2021 | | Singapore Indoor Stadium | Singapore |
| 15 | ONE Championship 144: First Strike | October 15, 2021 | | Singapore Indoor Stadium | Singapore |
| 16 | ONE Championship 145: NextGen | October 29, 2021 | October 29, 2021 | Singapore Indoor Stadium | Singapore |
| 17 | ONE: Championship 146: NextGen 2 | October 29, 2021 | November 12, 2021 | Singapore Indoor Stadium | Singapore |
| 18 | ONE Championship 147: NextGen 3 | October 29, 2021 | November 26, 2021 | Singapore Indoor Stadium | Singapore |
| 19 | ONE Championship 148: Winter Warriors | December 3, 2021 | December 3, 2021 | Singapore Indoor Stadium | Singapore |
| 20 | ONE Championship 149: Winter Warriors 2 | December 3, 2021 | December 17, 2021 | Singapore Indoor Stadium | Singapore |

=== ONE on TNT ===
ONE on TNT
| No. | Event | Event Date | Air date | Venue | Location |
|---|---|---|---|---|---|
| 1 | ONE on TNT 1 (ONE 132) | April 7, 2021 | April 7, 2021 | Singapore Indoor Stadium | Singapore |
| 2 | ONE on TNT 2 (ONE 133) | April 7, 2021 | April 14, 2021 | Singapore Indoor Stadium | Singapore |
| 3 | ONE on TNT 3 (ONE 134) | April 7, 2021 | April 21, 2021 | Singapore Indoor Stadium | Singapore |
| 4 | ONE on TNT 4 (ONE 135) | April 28, 2021 | | Singapore Indoor Stadium | Singapore |

=== Road to ONE ===
Road to ONE
| No. | Event | Date | Venue | Location |
|---|---|---|---|---|
| 1 | Road to ONE: Young Guns | February 22, 2021 | Tsutaya O-East | Tokyo, Japan |
| 2 | Road to ONE: RUF 39 | March 13, 2021 | Glendale Civic Center | Glendale, Arizona, United States |
| 3 | Road to ONE: Night of Warriors 17 | April 24, 2021 | - | Prague, Czech Republic |
| 4 | Road to ONE: RUF 40 | April 25, 2021 | Glendale Civic Center | Glendale, Arizona, United States |
| 5 | Road to ONE: Arena Friday Night Fights 2 | June 11, 2021 | Kovilovo Resort | Belgrade, Serbia |
| 6 | Road to ONE: RUF 41 | June 20, 2021 | Celebrity Theatre | Phoenix, Arizona, United States |
| 7 | Road to ONE: Strikers Cage Championship 7 | June 26, 2021 | Pabellon Quico Cabrera | Tenerife, Spain |
| 8 | Road to ONE: Vendetta fight nights 20 | July 3, 2021 | IBB Hamza Yerlikaya Sport Kompleksi | Istanbul, Turkey |
| 9 | Road to ONE: MMA Live 8 | July 17, 2021 | Sachsen Arena | Riesa, Germany |
| 10 | Road to ONE: RUF 42 | July 31, 2021 | Celebrity Theatre | Phoenix, Arizona, United States |
| 11 | Road to ONE: RUF 43 | August 29, 2021 | Celebrity Theatre | Phoenix, Arizona, United States |
| 12 | Road to ONE: Sexyama Edition | October 5, 2021 | Tsutaya O-East | Tokyo, Japan |
| 13 | Road to ONE: Muay Thai Grand Prix | October 9, 2021 | The O2 Arena | London, England |
| 14 | Road to ONE: RUF 44 | October 23, 2021 | Celebrity Theatre | Phoenix, Arizona, United States |
| 15 | Road to ONE: Mix Fight 49 | December 4, 2021 | Dinamo Sport Complex | Yerevan, Armenia |
| 16 | Road to ONE: RUF 45 | December 18, 2021 | Celebrity Theatre | Phoenix, Arizona, United States |

== Grand Prix ==
=== 2021 Kickboxing Featherweight Grand Prix ===
==== ONE Kickboxing Featherweight Grand Prix bracket ====
Quarter-finals
(Thailand) Sitthichai Sitsongpeenong | SD
(Netherlands) Tayfun Özcan | 3r.
(Germany) Enriko Kehl | 1r.
(Georgia (country)) Davit Kiria | TKO
(Armenia) Marat Grigorian | TKO
(Netherlands) Andy Souwer | 2r.
(France) Samy Sana | 1r.
(Belarus) Chingiz Allazov | KO

Semi-finals
(Thailand) Sitthichai Sitsongpeenong | TBD
(Georgia (country)) Davit Kiria | TBD
(Armenia) Marat Grigorian | TBD
(Belarus) Chingiz Allazov | TBD

Final
TBD
TBD

=== 2021 Women's Atomweight Grand Prix ===
==== Background ====
As the reigning ONE Atomeweight champion Angela Lee was unable to defend her title, due to becoming pregnant, ONE CEO Chatri Sityodtong announced that an atomweight Grand Prix would be held to determine the next title challenger.

The eight participants of the tournament were revealed on February 24, 2021. They included the former Rizin, Road FC and Jewels Atomweight champion Seo Hee Ham, the #1 ranked Denice Zamboanga, the #2 ranked Meng Bo, the former ONE Kickboxing and Muaythai Atomeweight champion Stamp Fairtex, as well as the non-ranked Ritu Phogat, Itsuki Hirata, Alyse Anderson and Alyona Rassohyna.

A bout between Ritu Phogat and Bi Nguyen took place at ONE Championship: Dangal for a spot in the Grand Prix. Nguyen won the close bout via split decision and Phogat was removed from the Grand Prix. Her place was taken by Julie Mezabarba and later Grace Cleveland. Phogat Rejoin Women's Atomweight World Grand Prix.

The quarterfinals are expected to take place at ONE Championship: Empower which was initially scheduled to be held on May 28, 2021, but was postponed due to the COVID-19 pandemic.

The second round of the grand prix will be determined by the fan vote.

==== ONE Women's Atomweight Grand Prix bracket ====
Quarter-finals
(Ukraine) Alyona Rassohyna | 3r.
(Thailand) Stamp Fairtex | SD
(Philippines) Denice Zamboanga | 3r.
(South Korea) Seo Hee Ham | SD
(China) Meng Bo | 3r.
(India) Ritu Phogat | UD
(Japan) Itsuki Hirata | 3r.
(United States) Alyse Anderson | UD

Semi-finals
(Thailand) Stamp Fairtex | UD
(Brazil) Julie Mezabarba | 3r.
(India) Ritu Phogat | UD
(Philippines) Jenelyn Olsim | 3r.

Final
(Thailand) Stamp Fairtex | SUB
(India) Ritu Phogat | 2r.

- Julie Mezabarba replaced injured Seo Hee Ham at the semi-finals.
- Jenelyn Olsim replaced injured (but she was sick four days before that fight) Itsuki Hirata at the semi-finals.

== Title fights ==
Title fights in 2021
| Weight class | | | | Method | Round | Time | Event | Notes |
|---|---|---|---|---|---|---|---|---|
| Bantamweight Kickboxing | Capitan Petchyindee | def. | Alaverdi Ramazanov (c) | TKO (leg kick and punches) | 2 | 1:56 | ONE: Unbreakable | (Note: For the ONE Bantamweight Kickboxing World Championship.) |
| Flyweight Kickboxing | Ilias Ennahachi (c) | def. | Superlek Kiatmuu9 | Decision (unanimous) | 5 | 3:00 | ONE: Fists of Fury | (Note: For the ONE Flyweight Kickboxing World Championship.) |
| Lightweight Kickboxing | Regian Eersel (c) | def. | Mustapha Haida | Decision (unanimous) | 5 | 3:00 | ONE: Fists of Fury | (Note: For the ONE Lightweight Kickboxing World Championship.) |
| Flyweight | Adriano Moraes (c) | def. | Demetrious Johnson | KO (knee and punches) | 2 | 2:24 | ONE on TNT 1 | (Note: For the ONE Flyweight World Championship.) |
| Lightweight | Christian Lee (c) | def. | Timofey Nastyukhin | TKO (punches) | 1 | 1:13 | ONE on TNT 2 | (Note: For the ONE Lightweight World Championship.) |
| Light Heavyweight | Reinier de Ridder | def. | Aung La Nsang (c) | Decision (unanimous) | 5 | 5:00 | ONE on TNT 4 | (Note: For the ONE Light Heavyweight World Championship.) |
| Heavyweight | Arjan Bhullar | def. | Brandon Vera (c) | TKO (punches) | 2 | 4:27 | ONE: Dangal | (Note: For the ONE Heavyweight World Championship.) |
| Strawweight Muay Thai | Prajanchai P.K.Seanchai | def. | Sam-A Gaiyanghadao (c) | Decision (majority) | 5 | 3:00 | ONE: Battleground | (Note: For the ONE Strawweight Muay Thai World Championship.) |
| Women's Strawweight | Xiong Jing Nan (c) | def. | Michelle Nicolini | Decision (unanimous) | 5 | 5:00 | ONE: Empower | (Note: For the ONE Women's Strawweight World Championship.) |
| Strawweight | Joshua Pacio (c) | def. | Yosuke Saruta | TKO (punches) | 1 | 3:38 | ONE: Revolution | (Note: For the ONE Strawweight World Championship.) |
| Bantamweight Kickboxing | Capitan Petchyindee (c) | def. | Mehdi Zatout | Decision (unanimous) | 5 | 3:00 | ONE: Revolution | (Note: For the ONE Bantamweight Kickboxing World Championship.) |
| Lightweight | Ok Rae-yoon | def. | Christian Lee (c) | Decision (unanimous) | 5 | 5:00 | ONE: Revolution | (Note: For the ONE Lightweight World Championship.) |
| Featherweight Kickboxing | Superbon Singha Mawynn | def. | Giorgio Petrosyan | KO (head kick) | 2 | 0:20 | ONE: First Strike | (Note: For the inaugural ONE Featherweight Kickboxing World Championship.) |
| Lightweight Kickboxing | Regian Eersel (c) | def. | Islam Murtazaev | Decision (split) | 5 | 3:00 | ONE: Winter Warriors | (Note: For the ONE Lightweight Kickboxing World Championship.) |

== ONE Championship: Unbreakable ==
ONE Championship: Unbreakable
- Promotion: ONE Championship
- Date: January 22, 2021
- Venue: Singapore Indoor Stadium
- City: Singapore

ONE Championship: Unbreakable (also known as ONE Championship 126) was a Combat sport event held by ONE Championship on January 22, 2021, at the Singapore Indoor Stadium in Kallang, Singapore.

=== Background ===
This event featured a kickboxing title fights. In the headline attraction, the reigning ONE Kickboxing Bantamweight Champion Alaverdi Ramazanov will defend his title for the first time against Capitan Petchyindee Academy. The co-main event of the evening was supposed to feature a title bout between the ONE Kickboxing Lightweight Champion Regian Eersel and Mustapha Haida, but it was reported that Haida has been forced out of the bout due to an undisclosed injury.

The card also feature a lightweight bout between the former ONE Lightweight Champion #5 ranked Shinya Aoki and the former LFA Welterweight Champion and ONE Welterweight World Title challenger James Nakashima.

Serbian heavyweight Rade Opacic was set to faces the promotional newcomer Patrick Schmid of Switzerland in a heavyweight kickboxing bout. However, a week before the event, Schmid withdrew from the bout, reportedly because one of his corner men has COVID-19. He was replaced by the promotional newcomer, Bruno Susano.

A strawweight bout between Hexigetu and Lito Adiwang was expected to take place at this event. However, Hexigetu pulled out a week before the event because his home province of Hebei, China, was put into lockdown following a recent COVID-19 spike. He was replaced by the reigning Deep Strawweight Champion Namiki Kawahara.

=== Results ===
ONE: Unbreakable
| Weight Class | | | | Method | Round | Time | Notes |
|---|---|---|---|---|---|---|---|
| Bantamweight 66 kg | (Thailand) Capitan Petchyindee Academy | def. | (Russia) Alaverdi Ramazanov (c) | KO (Leg Kick & Right Cross) | 2 | 1:56 | For the ONE Kickboxing Bantamweight Championship |
| Lightweight 77 kg | (Japan) Shinya Aoki | def. | (United States) James Nakashima | Submission (Rear-Naked Choke) | 1 | 2:42 | |
| Heavyweight 120 kg | (Serbia) Rade Opačić | def. | (Portugal) Bruno Susano | TKO (Punches) | 2 | 1:11 | Kickboxing |
| Welterweight 84 kg | (Russia) Gadzhimurad Abdulaev | def. | (Sweden) Zebaztian Kadestam | Submission (Face Crank) | 1 | 2:08 | |
| W.Atomweight 52 kg | (China) Meng Bo | def. | (Brazil) Samara Santos | Decision (Unanimous) | 3 | 5:00 | |
| Strawweight 57 kg | (Philippines) Lito Adiwang | def. | (Japan) Namiki Kawahara | KO (Punch) | 2 | 2:02 | |

== ONE Championship: Unbreakable 2 ==
ONE Championship: Unbreakable 2
- Promotion: ONE Championship
- Date: January 22, 2021 (aired January 29, 2021)
- Venue: Singapore Indoor Stadium
- City: Singapore

ONE Championship: Unbreakable 2 (also known as ONE Championship 127) was a Combat sport event held by ONE Championship on January 22, 2021, at the Singapore Indoor Stadium in Kallang, Singapore.It was first broadcast on January 29, 2021.

=== Background ===
The event featured the former Cage Warriors Heavyweight Champion Mauro Cerilli who made his fourth ONE appearance against the promotional newcomer Abdulbasir Vagabov in the event headliner.

In the co-main event the former Shooto Featherweight Champion Daichi Takenaka moved back to 61 kg to face the former Jungle Fight Interim Flyweight Champion Ivanildo Delfino.

Senegalese wrestler Oumar Kane made his debut against the 4-time Muay Thai champion Alain Ngalani.

=== Results ===
ONE: Unbreakable 2
| Weight Class | | | | Method | Round | Time | Notes |
|---|---|---|---|---|---|---|---|
| Heavyweight 120 kg | (Italy) Mauro Cerilli | def. | (Russia) Abdulbasir Vagabov | TKO (Leg Kick and Punches) | 2 | 0:36 | |
| Flyweight 61 kg | (Japan) Daichi Takenaka | def. | (Brazil) Ivanildo Delfino | Submission (Rear-Naked Choke) | 3 | 2:55 | |
| Bantamweight 66 kg | (South Korea) Kwon Won Il | def. | (China) Chen Rui | TKO (Punch to the Body) | 3 | 0:31 | |
| Light Heavyweight 102 kg | (Russia) Beybulat Isaev | def. | (Serbia) Mihajlo Kecojevic | KO (Punch) | 1 | 1:22 | Kickboxing |
| W.Catchweight 62.5 kg | (United States) Sovannahry Em | def. | (South Korea) Choi Jeong Yun | TKO (Punches) | 2 | 2:51 | |
| Heavyweight 120 kg | (Senegal) Oumar Kane | def. | (Cameroon) Alain Ngalani | TKO (Punches) | 1 | 4:32 | |

== ONE Championship: Unbreakable 3 ==
ONE Championship: Unbreakable 3
- Promotion: ONE Championship
- Date: January 22, 2021 (aired February 5, 2021)
- Venue: Singapore Indoor Stadium
- City: Singapore

ONE Championship: Unbreakable 3 (also known as ONE Championship 128) was a Combat sport event held by ONE Championship on January 22, 2021, at the Singapore Indoor Stadium in Kallang, Singapore. It was first broadcast on February 5, 2021.

=== Background ===
The event was headlined by former kickboxing and muay thai world champion Stamp Fairtex who faced Alyona Rassohyna. In the co-main event, a bantamweight bout between #2 ranked Shoko Sato who faces Fabrício Andrade.

The remaining three bouts will feature a strawweight bout between Ryuto Sawada and Robin Catalan, a lightweight bout between Raul Raju and Ahmed Mujtaba, and a bantamweight fight between Tial Thang and Paul Lumihi. Han Zihao and Adam Noi will compete in the sole Muay Thai contest of the event.

=== Results ===
ONE: Unbreakable 3
| Weight Class | | | | Method | Round | Time | Notes |
|---|---|---|---|---|---|---|---|
| Atomweight 52 kg | (Ukraine) Alyona Rassohyna | def. | (Thailand) Stamp Fairtex | Submission (Guillotine Choke) | 3 | 4:53 | |
| Bantamweight 66 kg | (Brazil) Fabrício Andrade | def. | (Japan) Shoko Sato | Decision (Unanimous | 3 | 5:00 | |
| Strawweight 57 kg | (Japan) Ryuto Sawada | def. | (Philippines) Robin Catalan | Submission (Rear-Naked Choke) | 1 | 4:19 | |
| Heavyweight 120 kg | (South Korea) Kang Ji Won | def. | (Iran) Mehdi Barghi | TKO (Punches) | 1 | 4:50 | |
| Lightweight 77 kg | (Pakistan) Ahmed Mujtaba | def. | (India) Rahul Raju | KO (Punches) | 1 | 0:56 | |
| Bantamweight 66 kg | (Myanmar) Tial Thang | def. | (Indonesia) Paul Lumihi | TKO (Punches) | 2 | 2:25 | |

== Road to ONE: Young Guns ==
Road to ONE: Young Guns
- Promotion: ONE Championship
- Date: February 22, 2021
- Venue: Tsutaya O-East
- City: Tokyo, Japan

Road to ONE: Young Guns was a Combat sport event held by ONE Championship in partnership with Shooto on February 22, 2021, at the Tsutaya O-East in Tokyo, Japan.

=== Background ===
The sixth edition of Road to ONE was the fourth edition held in Japan. A women's atomweight bout between Itsuki Hirata and Miku Nakamura served as the main event.

Hikaru Yoshino was scheduled to face Tomohiro Hagino in a flyweight bout, but Hagino was forced off the card on February 9 with a rib injury. Yoshino instead faced Shohei Nose, who stepped in on short notice for this encounter.

=== Results ===
Road to ONE
| Weight Class | | | | Method | Round | Time | Notes |
|---|---|---|---|---|---|---|---|
| W.Atomweight 52 kg | (Japan) Itsuki Hirata | def. | (Japan) Miku Nakamura | TKO (Punches) | 2 | 2:34 | |
| Lightweight 77 kg | (Japan) Kazuki Kasai | def. | (Japan) Takuya Nagata | TKO (Corner Stoppage) | 3 | 2:50 | |
| Flyweight 61 kg | (Japan) Toru Ogawa | def. | (Japan) Kenji Yamanaka | Decision (Unanimous) | 3 | 5:00 | |
| Catchweight 54 kg | (Japan) Shoa Arii | def. | (Japan) Yu Hiramatsu | KO (Spinning Back Fist) | 2 | 2:25 | Kickboxing |
| Catchweight 67 kg | (Japan) Hikaru Yoshino | def. | (Japan) Shohei Nose | Decision (Split) | 3 | 5:00 | |
| Featherweight 70 kg | (Japan) Hirotaka Nakada | def. | (Japan) Tatsuhiko Iwamoto | TKO (Punches) | 1 | 3:33 | |
| Strawweight 57 kg | (Japan) Keito Yamakita | def. | (Japan) Shuto Aki | TKO (Punches) | 2 | 2:21 | |
| Bantamweight 66 kg | (Japan) Toshiomi Kazama | def. | (Japan) Kohei Maeda | TKO (Punches) | 1 | 3:04 | |
| Strawweight 57 kg | (Japan) Koyuru Tanoue | def. | (Japan) Takafumi Ato | Decision (Unanimous) | 3 | 5:00 | |

== ONE Championship: Fists Of Fury ==
ONE Championship: Fists Of Fury
- Promotion: ONE Championship
- Date: February 26, 2021
- Venue: Singapore Indoor Stadium
- City: Singapore

ONE Championship: Fists Of Fury (also known as ONE Championship 129) was a Combat sport event held by ONE Championship on February 26, 2021, at the Singapore Indoor Stadium in Kallang, Singapore.

=== Background ===
The event featured a kickboxing title fight between the reigning ONE Flyweight Kickboxing World Champion Ilias Ennahachi and #2-ranked contender Superlek Kiatmuu9 as the main event of the evening. In the co-main event #1-ranked lightweight kickboxer Giorgio Petrosyan faced the former Glory Lightweight Champion Davit Kiria who made his ONE Championship debut.

Also on the card, ONE Flyweight Muay Thai World Champion Rodtang Jitmuangnon was set make his kickboxing debut against Alejandro Rivas. However, Rivas has been forced to withdraw from the contest due to health and safety protocols. Rivas was replaced by Tagir Khalilov, who stepped in on short notice for this encounter.

Hiroki Akimoto and Zhang Chenglong fought a rematch, four months after their first fight, which Akimoto won by split decision.

In the opening bout Victoria Lee, the sister of Christian Lee and Angela Lee, made her MMA debut against Sunisa Srisen.

=== Results ===
ONE: Fists Of Fury
| Weight Class | | | | Method | Round | Time | Notes |
|---|---|---|---|---|---|---|---|
| Flyweight 61 kg | (Netherlands) Ilias Ennahachi (c) | def. | (Thailand) Superlek Kiatmuu9 | Decision (Unanimous) | 5 | 3:00 | For the ONE Kickboxing Flyweight Championship |
| Featherweight 70 kg | (Armenia) Giorgio Petrosyan | def. | (Georgia (country)) Davit Kiria | Decision (Unanimous) | 3 | 3:00 | Kickboxing |
| Flyweight 61 kg | (Thailand) Rodtang Jitmuangnon | def. | (Russia) Tagir Khalilov | Decision (Split) | 3 | 3:00 | Kickboxing |
| Bantamweight 66 kg | (Japan) Hiroki Akimoto | def. | (China) Zhang Chenglong | Decision (Unanimous) | 3 | 3:00 | Kickboxing |
| W.Strawweight 57 kg | (United States) Jackie Buntan | def. | (Thailand) Nat Jaroonsak | Decision (Unanimous) | 3 | 3:00 | Muay Thai |
| W.Atomweight 52 kg | (United States) Victoria Lee | def. | (Thailand) Sunisa Srisen | Submission (Rear-Naked Choke) | 2 | 1:03 | |

== ONE Championship: Fists Of Fury 2 ==
ONE Championship: Fists Of Fury 2
- Promotion: ONE Championship
- Date: February 26, 2021 (aired March 5, 2021)
- Venue: Singapore Indoor Stadium
- City: Singapore

ONE Championship: Fists Of Fury 2 (also known as ONE Championship 130) was a Combat sport event held by ONE Championship on February 26, 2021, at the Singapore Indoor Stadium in Kallang, Singapore. It was first broadcast on March 5, 2021.

=== Background ===
The event was headlined by a bout between two promotional newcomers, the Iranian Amir Aliakbari has met the undefeated South Korean Kang Ji Won. The co-main event also featured the promotional debut of Anatoly Malykhin against the former ONE Light Heavyweight World Title challenger Alexandre Machado.

=== Results ===
ONE: Fists Of Fury 2
| Weight Class | | | | Method | Round | Time | Notes |
|---|---|---|---|---|---|---|---|
| Heavyweight 120 kg | (South Korea) Kang Ji Won | def. | (Iran) Amir Aliakbari | KO (Punch) | 1 | 1:54 | |
| Heavyweight 120 kg | (Russia) Anatoly Malykhin | def. | (Brazil) Alexandre Machado | TKO (Submission to Strikes) | 1 | 3:28 | |
| Featherweight 70 kg | (China) Tang Kai | def. | (Japan) Ryogo Takahashi | TKO (Punches) | 1 | 1:59 | |
| Featherweight 70 kg | (Japan) Yoshiki Nakahara | def. | (Kyrgyzstan) Ruslan Emilbek | TKO (Punches) | 1 | 1:30 | |
| Bantamweight 66 kg | (China) Han Zihao | def. | (Algeria) Adam Noi | Decision (Unanimous) | 3 | 3:00 | Muay Thai |
| Bantamweight 66 kg | (New Zealand) Mark Abelardo | def. | (United States) Emilio Urrutia | KO (Elbow) | 2 | 3:20 | |

== ONE Championship: Fists Of Fury 3 ==
ONE Championship: Fists Of Fury 3
- Promotion: ONE Championship
- Date: February 26, 2021 (aired March 19, 2021)
- Venue: Singapore Indoor Stadium
- City: Singapore

ONE Championship: Fists Of Fury 3 (also known as ONE Championship 131) was a Combat sport event held by ONE Championship on February 26, 2021, at the Singapore Indoor Stadium in Kallang, Singapore. It was first broadcast on March 19, 2021.

=== Background ===
Regian Eersel was scheduled to make the second defense of his ONE Kickboxing Lightweight title against Islam Murtazaev, but Murtazaev had to withdraw for undisclosed reasons, and was replaced by Mustapha Haida. Eersel and Haida were originally scheduled to fight at ONE: Unbreakable, before the fight fell through when haida suffered an injury.

in the co-main event the ONE Kickboxing Atomweight champion Janet Todd has faced the former WBC Muaythai Bantamweight champion Alma Juniku, in a Muay thai bout.

=== Results ===
ONE: Fists Of Fury 3
| Weight Class | | | | Method | Round | Time | Notes |
|---|---|---|---|---|---|---|---|
| Lightweight 77 kg | (Suriname) Regian Eersel (c) | def. | (Morocco) Mustapha Haida | Decision (Unanimous) | 5 | 3:00 | For the ONE Kickboxing Lightweight Championship |
| W.Atomweight 52 kg | (United States) Janet Todd | def. | (Australia) Alma Juniku | Decision (Unanimous) | 3 | 3:00 | Muay Thai |
| Strawweight 57 kg | (Japan) Hiroba Minowa | def. | (Brazil) Alex Silva | Decision (Split) | 3 | 5:00 | |
| W.Strawweight 57 kg | (Philippines) Jenelyn Olsim | def. | (Brazil) Maira Mazar | Submission (Guillotine Choke) | 3 | 0:41 | |
| Flyweight 61 kg | (India) Roshan Mainam | def. | (Indonesia) Malik Abdul Aziz Calim Akbar | Submission (Rear-Naked Choke) | 1 | 2:45 | |
| Flyweight 61 kg | (China) Hu Yong | def. | (Thailand) Yodkaikaew Fairtex | Decision (Unanimous) | 3 | 5:00 | |

== Road to ONE: RUF 39 ==
Road to ONE: RUF 39
- Promotion: ONE Championship
- Date: March 13, 2021
- Venue: Glendale Civic Center
- City: Glendale, Arizona, United States

Road to ONE: RUF 39 was a Combat sport event held by ONE Championship in partnership with RUF Nation on March 13, 2021, at the Glendale Civic Center in Glendale, Arizona, United States.

=== Background ===
The event will feature a 16-man heavyweight tournament, with the champion receiving a US$100,000+ contract to compete in ONE Championship.

=== Results ===
Road to ONE
| Weight Class | | | | Method | Round | Time | Notes |
|---|---|---|---|---|---|---|---|
| Heavyweight 120 kg | (United States) Rich Hale | def. | (United States) Eric Lunsford | TKO (Punches) | 1 | 3:11 | RUF MMA Road to ONE First round |
| Heavyweight 120 kg | (United States) Tra'Von Butler | def. | (United States) Corey Mullis | TKO (Punches) | 1 | 3:55 | RUF MMA Road to ONE First round |
| Lightweight 70 kg | (United States) Ivey Nixon | def. | (United States) Kekoa Corpuz | TKO (Punches) | 3 | 4:00 | |
| Feathertweight 66 kg | (United States) Ivan Tena | def. | (United States) Ricardo Canales | KO (Punch) | 1 | 0:10 | |
| Lightweight 70 kg | (United States) Bret Cooper | def. | (United States) Jordan Christensen | KO (Punch) | 3 | 2:14 | |

== ONE on TNT 1 ==
ONE on TNT 1
- Promotion: ONE Championship
- Date: April 7, 2021
- Venue: Singapore Indoor Stadium
- City: Singapore
- Estimated viewers: 196,000

ONE Championship on TNT 1 (also known as ONE Championship 132: Moraes vs. Johnson) was a Combat sport event held by ONE Championship on April 7, 2021, at the Singapore Indoor Stadium in Kallang, Singapore. This event marked the debut of ONE Championship on American television network TNT.

=== Background ===
The reigning ONE Flyweight Muay Thai World Champion Rodtang Jitmuangnon was scheduled to fight Jacob Smith in a non-title bout. Smith withdrew before the event, and Rodtang instead faced Danial Williams in the main event.

The co-main event featured a title bout between the 2019 ONE Flyweight Grand Prix winner and former UFC Flyweight Champion Demetrious Johnson and the reigning ONE Flyweight champion Adriano Moraes.

In the TNT opening bout, former UFC Lightweight champion Eddie Alvarez fought the former ONE Lightweight title challenger Iuri Lapicus.

A rematch between Enriko Kehl and Chingiz Allazov was the sole kickboxing match scheduled for the event. The bout was previously scheduled for One on TNT 3.,

Two heavyweight bouts were scheduled for the prelim portion of the card, first Oumar Kane against Mehdi Barghi in an MMA bout and Patrick Schmid against Rade Opacic in a kickboxing bout. However, Medhi Barghi and Rade Opacic were out of their respective bout due to health and safety protocols. Schmid and Kane have met in a short-notice MMA fight.

=== Results ===
ONE on TNT 1
| Weight Class | | | | Method | Round | Time | Notes |
|---|---|---|---|---|---|---|---|
| Catchweight 61.5 kg | (Thailand) Rodtang Jitmuangnon | def. | (Australia) Danial Williams | Decision (Unanimous) | 3 | 3:00 | Muay Thai |
| Flyweight 61 kg | (Brazil) Adriano Moraes (c) | def. | (United States) Demetrious Johnson | KO (Knee and Punches) | 2 | 2:24 | For the ONE Flyweight Championship |
| Lightweight 77 kg | (Moldova) Iuri Lapicus | - | (United States) Eddie Alvarez | NC (overturned) | 1 | 1:03 | Originally ruled a DQ (punches to back of head) loss for Alvarez; overturned to a no contest when Alvarez appealed the decision. |
Preliminary Card
| Welterweight 84 kg | (Russia) Raimond Magomedaliev | def. | (United States) Tyler McGuire | Decision (Unanimous) | 3 | 5:00 | |
| Featherweight 70 kg | (Germany) Enriko Kehl | def. | (Belarus) Chingiz Allazov | Decision (Split) | 3 | 3:00 | Kickboxing |
| Heavyweight 120 kg | (Senegal) Oumar Kane | def. | (Switzerland) Patrick Schmid | TKO (Punches) | 1 | 1:48 | |

== ONE on TNT 2 ==
ONE on TNT 2
- Promotion: ONE Championship
- Date: April 7, 2021 (aired April 14, 2021)
- Venue: Singapore Indoor Stadium
- City: Singapore
- Estimated viewers: 337,000

ONE Championship on TNT 2 (also known as ONE Championship 133) was a Combat sport event held by ONE Championship on April 7, 2021, at the Singapore Indoor Stadium in Kallang, Singapore. It was first aired on April 14, 2021.

=== Background ===
The event was headlined by a title bout between the ONE Lightweight World Champion Christian Lee and Timofey Nastyukhin.

Former ONE Featherweight champion Martin Nguyen was scheduled to fight against the #5 ranked Kim Jae Woong. However, due to health and safety protocols, Nguyen has not been cleared to compete and the bout has been removed from the card.

A heavyweight bout between Brazilian jiu-jitsu legend Marcus Almeida and Kang Ji Won was previously scheduled for ONE on TNT 2. However, Won pulled out of the fight due to undisclosed reasons and the bout was scrapped. They were replaced by an atomweight muay thai fight between the reigning ONE Kickboxing Atomweight champion Janet Todd and Anne Line Hogstad.

Dustin Joynson was originally scheduled to headline the lead card against Islam Abasov, but the Russian has withdrawn from the contest for undisclosed reasons. Joynson will instead face the promotional newcomer Kirill Grishenko, who stepped in on short notice for this bout.

The final preliminary fight was to be a muay thai bout between Pongsiri P.K.Saenchaimuaythaigym and Liam Harrison. The fight was later cancelled due to the COVID-19 situation in the UK. A bantamweight bout between Mitchell Chamale and Shuya Kamikubo replaced them.

Jarred Brooks signed a contract with ONE Championship, and is expected to make his promotional debut against Lito Adiwang at this event. The fight was later postponed, as Adiwang tested positive for COVID-19, and was replaced by a flyweight bout between Kim Kyu Sung and Wang Shuo.

Shinechagtga Zoltsetseg and Yoshiki Nakahara were scheduled to fight at featherweight in the final preliminary fight of the card.

=== Results ===
ONE on TNT 2
| Weight Class | | | | Method | Round | Time | Notes |
|---|---|---|---|---|---|---|---|
| Lightweight 77 kg | (United States) Christian Lee (c) | def. | (Russia) Timofey Nastyukhin | TKO (Punches) | 1 | 1:13 | For the ONE Lightweight Championship |
| W.Atomweight 52 kg | (United States) Janet Todd | def. | (Norway) Anne Line Hogstad | TKO (Kick to the Body) | 3 | 1:36 | Muay Thai |
Preliminary Card
| Featherweight 70 kg | (Japan) Yoshiki Nakahara | def. | (Mongolia) Shinechagtga Zoltsetseg | DQ (Illegal Kick) | 2 | 4:50 | |
| Flyweight 61 kg | (China) Wang Shuo | def. | (South Korea) Kim Kyu Sung | KO (Elbow and Punches) | 3 | 1:51 | |
| Bantamweight 66 kg | (Japan) Shuya Kamikubo | def. | (United States) Mitchell Chamale | Submission (Rear-Naked Choke) | 2 | 2:13 | |

== ONE on TNT 3 ==
ONE on TNT 3
- Promotion: ONE Championship
- Date: April 7, 2021 (aired April 21, 2021)
- Venue: Singapore Indoor Stadium
- City: Singapore
- Estimated viewers: 290,000

ONE Championship on TNT 3 (also known as ONE Championship 134) was a combat sport event held by ONE Championship on April 7, 2021, at the Singapore Indoor Stadium in Kallang, Singapore. It was first aired on April 21, 2021.

=== Background ===
The event was expected to headlined by a bantamweight fight between the John Lineker and promotional newcomer Stephen Loman. However, Loman would later withdraw from the card, as he tested positive for COVID-19, and was replaced by Troy Worthen.

The co-main event saw a heavyweight bout between the Iranian Amir Aliakbari and Anatoly Malykhin. The fight was later replaced by a lightweight contest between former ONE Featherweight World Champion Marat Gafurov and Ok Rae-yoon.

John Wayne Parr made his ONE debut against the former Glory champion Nieky Holzken. It will be Parr's first fight since November 2019.

Two MMA fights were scheduled for the prelims: a flyweight bout between the #5 ranked Reece McLaren and the #4 ranked Yuya Wakamatsu.

A rematch between Enriko Kehl and Chingiz Allazov was the scheduled for the event, but the bout was moved to ONE on TNT 1.

=== Results ===
ONE on TNT 3
| Weight Class | | | | Method | Round | Time | Notes |
|---|---|---|---|---|---|---|---|
| Bantamweight 66 kg | (Brazil) John Lineker | def. | (United States) Troy Worthen | KO (Punches) | 1 | 4:35 | |
| Flyweight 61 kg | (Japan) Yuya Wakamatsu | def. | (Australia) Reece McLaren | Decision (Unanimous) | 3 | 5:00 | |
Preliminary Card
| Lightweight 77 kg | (South Korea) Ok Rae-yoon | def. | (Russia) Marat Gafurov | Decision (Unanimous) | 3 | 5:00 | |
| Strawweight 57 kg | (China) Miao Li Tao | def. | (Japan) Ryuto Sawada | Decision (Unanimous) | 3 | 5:00 | |
| Catchweight 80.8 kg | (Netherlands) Nieky Holzken | def. | (Australia) John Wayne Parr | TKO (Head Kick) | 2 | 1:23 | Muay Thai |

== Road to ONE: Night of Warriors 17 ==
Road to ONE: Night of Warriors 17
- Promotion: ONE Championship
- Date: April 24, 2021
- City: Prague, Czech Republic

Road to ONE: Night of Warriors 17 was a kickboxing event held by ONE Championship in partnership with Night of Warriors on April 24, 2021, in Prague, Czech Republic.

=== Background ===
ONE Championship held a one night 4-man qualification tournament including Tomáš Hron, Mehmet Özer, Mohamed Amine and Cyril Cereyon.

=== Results ===
Road to ONE
| Weight Class | | | | Method | Round | Time | Notes |
|---|---|---|---|---|---|---|---|
| Bantamweight 66 kg | (Czech Republic) Václav Sivák | def. | (Romania) Marian-Florin Soare | KO (Punch and Knee to the body) | 1 | 1:36 | Kickboxing |
| Welterweight 85 kg | (Czech Republic) Matěj Kozubovský | def. | (Canada) Olivier Langlois-Ross | Decision (Unanimous) | 3 | 3:00 | Kickboxing |
| Catchweight 69 kg | (Russia) Vasilii Semenov | def. | (Czech Republic) Matěj Nuska | Decision (Unanimous) | 3 | 3:00 | Kickboxing |
| Featherweight 71 kg | (Czech Republic) Michael Krčmář | def. | (Turkey) Umut Norgaz | Decision (Unanimous) | 3 | 3:00 | Kickboxing |
| Heavyweight 120 kg | (Netherlands) Brian Douwes | def. | (Czech Republic) David Vinš | TKO (Punches) | 2 | 0:32 | Kickboxing |
| Catchweight 72 kg | (Czech Republic) Antonín Nygrín | def. | (Romania) Laurențiu Partenie | Decision (Split) | 3 | 3:00 | Kickboxing |
| Heavyweight 120 kg | (Czech Republic) Tomáš Hron | def. | (Morocco) Mohamed Amine | Decision (Unanimous) | 3 | 3:00 | Heavyweight Tournament Final |
| Heavyweight 120 kg | (Guinea-Bissau) Melvin Mané | def. | (Netherlands) Rio Richardson | TKO (Knee) | 2 | 2:45 | Kickboxing |
| Welterweight 85 kg | (Russia) Nikita Kozlov | def. | (Czech Republic) Dominik Sívek | Decision (Unanimous) | 3 | 3:00 | Kickboxing |
| Heavyweight 120 kg | (Hungary) David Mykhaylov | def. | (Czech Republic) Martin Horský | Decision (Unanimous) | 3 | 3:00 | Heavyweight Tournament Reserve |
| Heavyweight 120 kg | (Morocco) Mohamed Amine | def. | (France) Cyril Cereyon | TKO (Doctor Stoppage) | 3 | 2:04 | Heavyweight Tournament Semi-finals |
| Heavyweight 120 kg | (Czech Republic) Tomáš Hron | def. | (Turkey) Mehmet Özer | TKO (Referee Stoppage) | 2 | 1:23 | Heavyweight Tournament Semi-finals |
Preliminary Card
| Featherweight 71 kg | (Czech Republic) Erik Micka | def. | (Czech Republic) Jan Sklenář | Decision (Unanimous) | 3 | 3:00 | Kickboxing |

== Road to ONE: RUF 40 ==
Road to ONE: RUF 40
- Promotion: ONE Championship
- Date: April 25, 2021
- Venue: Glendale Civic Center
- City: Glendale, Arizona, United States

Road to ONE: RUF 40 was a Combat sport event held by ONE Championship in partnership with RUF Nation on April 25, 2021, at the Glendale Civic Center in Glendale, Arizona, United States.

=== Results ===
Road to ONE
| Weight Class | | | | Method | Round | Time | Notes |
|---|---|---|---|---|---|---|---|
| Heavyweight 120 kg | (United States) Jordan Powell | def. | (United States) Brandon Cash | TKO (Punches) | 3 | 1:44 | RUF MMA Road to ONE First round |
| Lightweight 70 kg | (Cuba) Ernesto Rodriguez | def. | (United States) Austin Wourms | TKO (Punches) | 1 | 1:48 | |
| Featherweight 66 kg | (United States) Marcus McGhee | def. | (United States) Ricky Maynez | TKO (Punches) | 2 | 3:51 | |
| Lightweight 70 kg | (United States) Gabe Rodriguez | def. | (United States) Jimmy Scully | TKO (Elbows and Punches) | 2 | 3:18 | |
| Featherweight 66 kg | (United States) Moses Diaz | def. | (United States) Octavian Trumbo | TKO (Punches) | 2 | 0:50 | |
| Lightweight 70 kg | (United States) Devon Brock | def. | (United States) Jose Campos | KO (Punches) | 1 | 0:40 | |

== ONE on TNT 4 ==
ONE on TNT 4
- Promotion: ONE Championship
- Date: April 28, 2021
- Venue: Singapore Indoor Stadium
- City: Singapore
- Estimated viewers: 219,000

ONE Championship on TNT 4 (also known as ONE Championship 135: N Sang vs. De Ridder 2) was a Combat sport event held by ONE Championship on April 28, 2021, at the Singapore Indoor Stadium in Kallang, Singapore.

=== Background ===
The event was supposed to be headlined by a trilogy bout between the ONE Light Heavyweight Champion Aung La Nsang and the former ONE Middleweight title challenger Vitaly Bigdash. Bigdash later withdrew due to a failed COVID-19 test, and was replaced by Reinier de Ridder.

A lightweight bout between Eduard Folayang and Yoshihiro Akiyama was expected for ONE on TNT 4. However, on April 3, Akiyama pulled out of the bout due to injuries sustained during his training camp. Shinya Aoki stepped in to face Folayang, Aoki was scheduled to fight Sage Northcutt in the opening bout of the main card. but Northcutt withdrew due to lingering COVID-19 issues.

Sovannahry Em was scheduled to face Colbey Northcutt at women's flyweight. Sovannahry Em later withdrew as she sustained an injury during a pre-bout training session, and was replaced by Courtney Martin.

A flyweight Muay Thai match between Jonathan Haggerty and Elias Mahmoudi was scheduled for the prelims as well, but did not take place.

ONE CEO Chatri Sityodtong revealed that the former Bellator and UFC Lightweight Champion Eddie Alvarez would face the winner of Marat Gafurov versus Ok Rae-yoon. As Ok won his fight Gafurov, he fought Alvarez in the co-main event.

A muay thai bout between Jackie Buntan and Ekaterina Vandaryeva, as well as a heavyweight mixed martial arts bout between Oumar Kane and Kirill Grishenko were later added to the card.

=== Results ===
ONE on TNT 4
| Weight Class | | | | Method | Round | Time | Notes |
|---|---|---|---|---|---|---|---|
| Light Heavyweight 102 kg | (Netherlands) Reinier de Ridder | def. | (Myanmar) Aung La Nsang (c) | Decision (Unanimous) | 5 | 5:00 | For the ONE Light Heavyweight Championship |
| Lightweight 77 kg | (South Korea) Ok Rae-yoon | def. | (United States) Eddie Alvarez | Decision (Unanimous) | 3 | 5:00 | |
| Heavyweight 120 kg | (Belarus) Kirill Grishenko | def. | (Senegal) Oumar Kane | TKO (Retirement) | 2 | 5:00 | |
Preliminary Card
| Lightweight 77 kg | (Japan) Shinya Aoki | def. | (Philippines) Eduard Folayang | Submission (Armbar) | 1 | 4:20 | |
| W.Strawweight 56.7 kg | (United States) Jackie Buntan | def. | (Belarus) Ekaterina Vandaryeva | Decision (Majority) | 3 | 3:00 | Muay Thai |
| W.Catchweight 60.6 kg | (United States) Colbey Northcutt | def. | (Australia) Courtney Martin | Submission (Armbar) | 1 | 2:28 | |

== ONE Championship: Dangal ==
ONE Championship: Dangal
- Promotion: ONE Championship
- Date: April 28, 2021 (aired May 15, 2021)
- Venue: Singapore Indoor Stadium
- City: Singapore

ONE Championship: Dangal (also known as ONE 136: Vera vs. Bhullar) was a combat sport event held by ONE Championship on April 28, 2021, at the Singapore Indoor Stadium in Kallang, Singapore. It was first aired on May 15, 2021.

=== Background ===
A ONE Heavyweight Championship bout between the current champion Brandon Vera and contender Arjan Bhullar served as the event headliner.

The co-main event was a bantamweight muay thai bout, contested between Tawanchai P.K. Saenchaimuaythaigym and Sean Clancy.

Undefeated atomweight Ritu Phogat faced Bi Nguyen.

A catchweight bout contested by Gurdarshan Mangat and Rosham Mainam also took place at this event.

The #4 ranked women's strawweight Ayaka Miura faced promotional newcomer Rayane Bastos in a 58 kg catchweight bout.

=== Results ===
ONE: Dangal
| Weight Class | | | | Method | Round | Time | Notes |
|---|---|---|---|---|---|---|---|
| Heavyweight 120 kg | (India) Arjan Bhullar | def. | (United States) Brandon Vera (c) | TKO (Punches) | 2 | 4:27 | For the ONE Heavyweight Championship |
| Bantamweight 66 kg | (Thailand) Tawanchai P.K. Saenchaimuaythaigym | def. | (Republic of Ireland) Sean Clancy | KO (Head Kick) | 3 | 0:35 | Muay Thai |
| Atomweight 52 kg | (Vietnam) Bi Nguyen | def. | (India) Ritu Phogat | Decision (Split) | 3 | 5:00 | |
| Catchweight 58 kg | (Japan) Ayaka Miura | def. | (Brazil) Rayane Bastos | Submission (Scarf Hold Americana) | 1 | 2:58 | |
| Catchweight 65 kg | (Canada) Gurdarshan Mangat | def. | (India) Roshan Mainam | Decision (Unanimous) | 3 | 5:00 | |

== ONE Championship: Full Blast ==
ONE Championship: Full Blast
- Promotion: ONE Championship
- Date: April 28, 2021 (aired May 28, 2021)
- Venue: Singapore Indoor Stadium
- City: Singapore

ONE Championship: Full Blast (also known as ONE 137: Saemapetch vs. Kulabdam) was a combat sport event held by ONE Championship on May 28, 2021, at the Singapore Indoor Stadium in Kallang, Singapore.

=== Background ===
The event was headlined by a bantamweight muay thai bout between Saemapetch Fairtex and the 2019 Lumpini Stadium 140 lbs champion Kulabdam Sor.Jor.Piek-U-Thai.

A flyweight bout between the promotional newcomer Kantharaj Shankar Agasa and the 7-fight ONE veteran Wei Xie was scheduled as the co-main event.

A featherweight bout between Ahmed Faress and Edward Kelly was scheduled for the event.

=== Results ===
ONE: Full Blast
| Weight Class | | | | Method | Round | Time | Notes |
|---|---|---|---|---|---|---|---|
| Bantamweight 66 kg | (Thailand) Saemapetch Fairtex | def. | (Thailand) Kulabdam Sor.Jor.Piek-U-Thai | KO (Straight Left to the Body) | 1 | 2:12 | Muay Thai |
| Flyweight 61 kg | (China) Xie Wei | def. | (India) Kantharaj Shankar Agasa | TKO (Retirement) | 2 | 5:00 | |
| Welterweight 84 kg | (Suriname) Miles Simson | def. | (Netherlands) Santino Verbeek | Decision (Unanimous) | 3 | 3:00 | Kickboxing |
| Featherweight 70 kg | (Philippines) Edward Kelly | def. | (Egypt) Ahmed Faress | Decision (Split) | 3 | 5:00 | |
| Catchweight 57.7 kg | (United States) Anthony Do | def. | (China) Liang Hui | Submission (Triangle Choke) | 2 | 3:53 | |

== ONE Championship: Full Blast 2 ==
ONE Championship: Full Blast 2
- Promotion: ONE Championship
- Date: April 28, 2021 (aired June 11, 2021)
- Venue: Singapore Indoor Stadium
- City: Singapore

ONE Championship: Full Blast 2 (also known as ONE 138: Mongkolpetch vs. Mahmoudi) was a combat sport event held by ONE Championship on June 11, 2021, at the Singapore Indoor Stadium in Kallang, Singapore.

=== Background ===
The event will be headlined by a catchweight Muay Thai bout between Mongkolpetch Petchyindee Academy and former ONE Flyweight Kickboxing title challenger Elias Mahmoudi.

A lightweight bout between Ben Wilhelm and Amarsanaa Tsogookhuu has been scheduled as the co-main event.

A featherweight bout between Ma Jia Wen and Yoon Chang Min has been scheduled for the event.

A flyweight kickboxing bout between Wang Wenfeng and Taiki Naito has also been scheduled for the event.

=== Results ===
ONE: Full Blast 2
| Weight Class | | | | Method | Round | Time | Notes |
|---|---|---|---|---|---|---|---|
| Catchweight 62.8 kg | (Thailand) Mongkolpetch Petchyindee Academy | def. | (Algeria) Elias Mahmoudi | Decision (Majority) | 3 | 3:00 | Muay Thai |
| Lightweight 77 kg | (Mongolia) Amarsanaa Tsogookhuu | def. | (United States) Ben Wilhelm | Decision (Unanimous) | 3 | 5:00 | |
| Featherweight 70 kg | (South Korea) Yoon Chang Min | def. | (China) Ma Jia Wen | Submission (Rear-Naked Choke) | 1 | 1:46 | |
| Flyweight 61 kg | (Japan) Taiki Naito | def. | (China) Wang Wenfeng | Decision (Unanimous) | 3 | 3:00 | Kickboxing |

== Road to ONE: Arena Friday Night Fights 2 ==
Road to ONE: Arena Friday Night Fights 2
- Promotion: ONE Championship
- Date: June 11, 2021
- Venue: Kovilovo Resort
- City: Belgrade, Serbia

Road to ONE: Arena Friday Night Fights 2 was a Kickboxing event held by ONE Championship in partnership with Arena Friday Night Fights on June 11, 2021, at the Kovilovo resort in Belgrade, Serbia.

=== Background ===
The event will feature a 4-man heavyweight qualification tournament to earn a sport in the Road to one Europe tournament, with the champion receiving a US$100,000+ contract to compete in ONE Championship.

=== Results ===
Road to ONE
| Weight Class | | | | Method | Round | Time | Notes |
|---|---|---|---|---|---|---|---|
| Heavyweight 120 kg | (Serbia) Nikola Filipović | def. | (Croatia) Anto Širić | TKO (Corner stoppage) | 1 | 1:20 | Heavyweight Tournament Final |
| Catchweight 86 kg | (Canada) Olivier Langlois-Ross | def. | (Serbia) Aleksandar Menkovic | Decision (Unanimous) | 3 | 3:00 | |
| Catchweight 79 kg | (Serbia) Nikola Todorović | def. | (Slovenia) Žiga Pecnik | KO (Body punch) | 1 | 1:24 | |
| Welterweight 84 kg | (North Macedonia) Boban Ilioski | def. | (Bosnia and Herzegovina) Mesud Selimović | KO (Flying knee) | 1 | 1:13 | |
| Featherweight 71 kg | (Serbia) Jovan Nikolić | def. | (Brazil) Vinicius Bereta | KO (Punches & Knee) | 3 | 0:57 | |
| W.Bantamweight 65 kg | (Serbia) Teodora Manić | def. | (Italy) Cristina Caruso (c) | Decision (Unanimous) | 5 | 3:00 | For the WAKO Women's 65 kg Kickboxing World Championship |
| W.Flyweight 61 kg | (Netherlands) Sarel de Jong | def. | (Czech Republic) Lucija Mudrohova | KO (Front kick) | 1 | 1:19 | |
| W.Featherweight 70 kg | (Netherlands) Dajenka Meijer | def. | (Serbia) Aleksandra Krstić | Decision (Split) | 3 | 3:00 | |
| W.Catchweight 60 kg | (Serbia) Milana Bjelogrlić | def. | (Croatia) Karmela Makelja | Decision (Unanimous) | 3 | 3:00 | |
| W.Catchweight 50 kg | (Serbia) Sara Zećiri | def. | (Serbia) Maja Ostojić | Decision (Unanimous) | 4 | 3:00 | |
| Heavyweight 120 kg | (Croatia) Anto Širić | def. | (Montenegro) Miroslav Vujović | Decision (Split) | 3 | 3:00 | Heavyweight Tournament Semi-finals |
| Heavyweight 120 kg | (Serbia) Nikola Filipović | def. | (North Macedonia) Aleksandr Dimovski | KO (Punches & Knee) | 3 | 0:51 | Heavyweight Tournament Semi-finals |
| Featherweight 71 kg | (Spain) Theo Alvaro Bashford | def. | (North Macedonia) Darko Najdov | Decision (Unanimous) | 3 | 3:00 | |

== Road to ONE: RUF 41 ==
Road to ONE: RUF 41
- Promotion: ONE Championship
- Date: June 20, 2021
- Venue: Celebrity Theatre
- City: Phoenix, Arizona, United States

Road to ONE: RUF 41 was a mixed martial arts event held by ONE Championship in partnership with RUF Nation on June 20, 2021, at the Celebrity Theatre in Phoenix, Arizona, United States.

=== Results ===
Road to ONE
| Weight Class | | | | Method | Round | Time | Notes |
|---|---|---|---|---|---|---|---|
| Bantamweight 66 kg | (United States) Roman Salazar | def. | (United States) Cody Huard | KO (Kick to the Body) | 3 | 2:54 | |
| Heavyweight 120 kg | (United States) Michael Quintero | def. | (United States) Cody East | TKO (Punches) | 1 | 4:04 | RUF MMA Road to ONE First round |
| Heavyweight 120 kg | (United States) Eduardo Perez | def. | (United States) Darion Abbey | TKO (Punches) | 2 | 3:15 | RUF MMA Road to ONE First round |
| Flyweight 61 kg | (United States) Talon Glasser | def. | (United States) Aaron Loya | Submission (Rear-Naked Choke) | 1 | 1:31 | |
| Catchweight 72.5 kg | (United States) Chris Renteria | def. | (United States) Troy Sanders | Submission (Rear-Naked Choke) | 1 | 1:36 | |

== Road to ONE: Strikers Cage Championship 7 ==
Road to ONE: Strikers Cage Championship 7
- Promotion: ONE Championship
- Date: June 26, 2021
- Venue: Pabellon Quico Cabrera
- City: Tenerife, Spain

Road to ONE: Strikers Cage Championship 7 was a Kickboxing event held by ONE Championship in partnership with Strikers Cage Championship on June 26, 2021, at the Pabellon Quico Cabrera in Tenerife, Spain.

=== Background ===
The event will feature a 4-man heavyweight qualification tournament to earn a sport in the Road to one Europe tournament.

=== Results ===
Road to ONE
| Weight Class | | | | Method | Round | Time | Notes |
|---|---|---|---|---|---|---|---|
| Heavyweight 120 kg | (Spain) Moisés Baute | def. | (Spain) David Trallero | Decision | 3 | 3:00 | Heavyweight Tournament Final |
| Heavyweight 120 kg | (Spain) David Trallero | def. | (Morocco) Mourad Zakari | Decision | 3 | 3:00 | Heavyweight Tournament Semi-finals |
| Heavyweight 120 kg | (Spain) Moisés Baute | def. | (Germany) Christian Brorhilker | KO (Kick to the Body) | 2 | 1:13 | Heavyweight Tournament Semi-finals |

== Road to ONE: Vendetta Fight Nights 20 ==
Road to ONE: Vendetta Fight Nights 20
- Promotion: ONE Championship
- Date: July 3, 2021
- Venue: IBB Hamza Yerlikaya Sports Complex
- City: Istanbul, Turkey

Road to ONE: Vendetta Fight Nights 20 was a Kickboxing event held by ONE Championship in partnership with Vendetta fight nights on July 3, 2021, at the IBB Hamza Yerlikaya Sport Kompleksi Istanbul, Turkey.

=== Background ===
The event will feature a 4-man heavyweight qualification tournament to earn a sport in the Road to one Europe tournament.

=== Results ===
Road to ONE
| Weight Class | | | | Method | Round | Time | Notes |
|---|---|---|---|---|---|---|---|
| Heavyweight 120 kg | (Turkey) Ahmet Tiren | def. | (Turkey) Mert Deştelen | | | | Heavyweight Tournament Final |
| Heavyweight 120 kg | (Turkey) Mert Deştelen | def. | (Turkey) Enes Tetik | | | | Heavyweight Tournament Semi-finals |
| Heavyweight 120 kg | (Turkey) Ahmet Tiren | def. | (Turkey) Gökhan Gülücü | | | | Heavyweight Tournament Semi-finals |

== Road to ONE: MMA Live 8 ==
Road to ONE: MMA Live 8
- Promotion: ONE Championship
- Date: July 17, 2021
- Venue: Sachsen Arena
- City: Riesa, Germany

Road to ONE: MMA Live 8 was a Combat sport event held by ONE Championship in partnership with MMA Live promotion on July 17, 2021, at the Sachsen Arena in Riesa, Germany.

=== Background ===
The event will feature a 4-man heavyweight qualification tournament to earn a sport in the Road to one Europe tournament.

=== Results ===
Road to ONE
| Weight Class | | | | Method | Round | Time | Notes |
|---|---|---|---|---|---|---|---|
| Heavyweight 120 kg | (Germany) Gerardo Atti | def. | (Germany) Vadim Feger | KO (Knee to the Head) | 2 | 1:22 | Kickboxing Heavyweight Tournament Final (Echiguer got injured and was replaced by Feger) |
| Light Heavyweight 93 kg | (Germany) Wladimir Holodenko | def. | (Lithuania) Erikas Golubovskis | Decision (Split) | 3 | 5:00 | |
| Light Heavyweight 93 kg | (Germany) Jan Zander | def. | (Italy) Gianluca Locicero | TKO (Punches) | 2 | 0:59 | |
| Welterweight 77 kg | (France) Sofiane Aïssaoui | def. | (Germany) Said Elderbiev | Submission (Rear-Naked Choke) | 1 | 3:52 | |
| Middleweight 84 kg | (Germany) Adnan Omar | def. | (Germany) Besim Krasniqi | Decision (Unanimous) | 3 | 5:00 | |
| Heavyweight 120 kg | (Germany) Noureddine Echiguer | def. | (Germany) Vadim Feger | TKO (3 Knockdown Rule) | 3 | 0:49 | Kickboxing Heavyweight Tournament Semi-finals |
| Heavyweight 120 kg | (Germany) Gerardo Atti | def. | (Germany) Christian Müller | KO (Head Kick and Punches) | 2 | 1:33 | Kickboxing Heavyweight Tournament Semi-finals |

== ONE Championship: Battleground ==
ONE Championship: Battleground
- Promotion: ONE Championship
- Date: July 30, 2021
- Venue: Singapore Indoor Stadium
- City: Singapore

ONE Championship: Battleground (also known as ONE 139: Sam-A vs. Prajanchai) was a Combat sport event held by ONE Championship on July 30, 2021, at the Singapore Indoor Stadium in Kallang, Singapore.

=== Background ===
The event will be headlined by a ONE Strawweight Muay Thai world title bout between Sam-A Gaiyanghadao and promotional newcomer Prajanchai P.K.Saenchaimuaythaigym.

The card also featured a middleweight bout between former two-division ONE world champion Aung La Nsang and Leandro Ataides.

A strawweight bout between Ryuto Sawada and Gustavo Balart was scheduled for the event.

Number-four featherweight kickboxer Sitthichai Sitsongpeenong will also face fifth-ranked Tayfun Ozcan in a featherweight kickboxing match. However, Ozcan was forced with withdraw due to an injury and Sitthichai was rescheduled to face Tawanchai P.K. Saenchaimuaythaigym at ONE Championship: Battleground 3 instead.

Two atomweight bouts have been scheduled: Ritu Phogat will face Lin Heqin, while Victoria Lee will face Wang Luping.

A bantamweight bout between Chen Rui and the debuting Jeremy Pacatiw has also been scheduled.

=== Results ===
ONE: Battleground
| Weight Class | | | | Method | Round | Time | Notes |
|---|---|---|---|---|---|---|---|
| Strawweight 57 kg | (Thailand) Prajanchai P.K.Seanchaimuaythaigym | def. | (Thailand) Sam-A Gaiyanghadao (c) | Decision (Majority) | 5 | 3:00 | For the ONE Muay Thai Strawweight Championship |
| Catchweight 95.8 kg | (Myanmar) Aung La Nsang | def. | (Brazil) Leandro Ataides | KO (Punches) | 1 | 3:45 | |
| Strawweight 57 kg | (Cuba) Gustavo Balart | def. | (Japan) Ryuto Sawada | Decision (Unanimous) | 3 | 5:00 | |
| W.Atomweight 52 kg | (India) Ritu Phogat | def. | (China) Lin Heqin | Decision (Unanimous) | 3 | 5:00 | |
| Bantamweight 66 kg | (Philippines) Jeremy Pacatiw | def. | (China) Chen Rui | Decision (Unanimous) | 3 | 5:00 | |
| W.Atomweight 52 kg | (United States) Victoria Lee | def. | (China) Wang Luping | Submission (Armbar) | 1 | 3:22 | |

== Road to ONE: RUF 42 ==
Road to ONE: RUF 42
- Promotion: ONE Championship
- Date: July 31, 2021
- Venue: Celebrity Theatre
- City: Phoenix, Arizona, United States

Road to ONE: RUF 42 will be a mixed martial arts event held by ONE Championship in partnership with RUF Nation on July 31, 2021, at the Celebrity Theatre in Phoenix, Arizona, United States.

=== Results ===
Road to ONE
| Weight Class | | | | Method | Round | Time | Notes |
|---|---|---|---|---|---|---|---|
| Flyweight 61 kg | (United States) Marcus McGhee | def. | (Brazil) Raphael Montini | TKO (Punches) | 2 | 1:57 | |
| Heavyweight 120 kg | (Dominican Republic) Waldo Cortes-Acosta | def. | (Brazil) Edison Lopes | Submission (Kimura) | 1 | 3:12 | RUF MMA Road to ONE First round |
| Flyweight 61 kg | (United States) Abdul Kamara | def. | (United States) Caleb Ramirez | Submission (Guillotine Choke) | 3 | 0:33 | |
| Catchweight 59 kg | (United States) Chance Ikei | def. | (United States) Jacobo Martos | Submission (Ankle Lock) | 2 | 2:09 | Amateur |
| Lightweight 77 kg | (United States) Sebastian Mordecai | def. | (United States) Mark Lozano | Decision (Split) | 3 | 3:00 | Amateur |
| Strawweight 57 kg | (China) An Ho (c) | def. | (United States) Aaisin Liberato | TKO (Punches) | 3 | 1:53 | RUF Amateur Title bout |

== ONE Championship: Battleground 2 ==
ONE Championship: Battleground 2
- Promotion: ONE Championship
- Date: July 30, 2021 (aired August 13, 2021)
- Venue: Singapore Indoor Stadium
- City: Singapore

ONE Championship: Battleground 2 (also known as ONE 140: Zhang vs. Folayang) was a Combat sport event held by ONE Championship on July 30, 2021, at the Singapore Indoor Stadium in Kallang, Singapore. It aired on August 13, 2021

=== Background ===
The main event featured a lightweight bout between former two-time ONE Lightweight Champion Eduard Folayang and former The Ultimate Fighter: China winner Zhang Lipeng.

The card also featured a strawweight bout between former ONE Strawweight Champion Alex Silva and Miao Li Tao.

A heavyweight bout between promotional newcomer Thomas Narmo and veteran Alain Ngalani also took place on the card.

The card featured a flyweight bout between Eko Roni Saputra and Liu Peng Shuai.

Former ONE Warrior Series winner Otgonbaatar Nergui faced Rahul Raju in a lightweight bout.

=== Results ===
ONE: Battleground 2
| Weight Class | | | | Method | Round | Time | Notes |
|---|---|---|---|---|---|---|---|
| Lightweight 77 kg | (China) Zhang Lipeng | def. | (Philippines) Eduard Folayang | Decision (Unanimous) | 3 | 5:00 | |
| Strawweight 57 kg | (Brazil) Alex Silva | def. | (China) Miao Li Tao | Decision (Unanimous) | 3 | 5:00 | |
| Heavyweight 120 kg | (Norway) Thomas Narmo | - | (Cameroon) Alain Ngalani | No Contest (Accidental Groin Kick) | 2 | 4:05 | |
| Flyweight 61 kg | (Indonesia) Eko Roni Saputra | def. | (China) Liu Peng Shuai | KO (Punch) | 1 | 0:10 | |
| Lightweight 77 kg | (India) Rahul Raju | def. | (Mongolia) Otgonbaatar Nergui | Submission (Rear-Naked Choke) | 2 | 3:54 | |

== ONE Championship: Battleground 3 ==
ONE Championship: Battleground 3
- Promotion: ONE Championship
- Date: July 30, 2021 (aired August 27, 2021)
- Venue: Singapore Indoor Stadium
- City: Singapore

ONE Championship: Battleground 3 (also known as ONE 141: Sitthichai vs. Tawanchai) was a Combat sport event held by ONE Championship on July 30, 2021, at the Singapore Indoor Stadium in Kallang, Singapore. It will be aired on August 27, 2021

=== Background ===
The event featured a catchweight Muay Thai contest between Tawanchai P.K. Saenchaimuaythaigym and Sitthichai Sitsongpeenong.

Saemapetch Fairtex was originally scheduled to square off against Tawanchai PK.Saenchai Muaythaigym, with the winner getting a shot at reigning ONE Bantamweight Muay Thai World Champion. However, Saemapetch's cornerman tested positive for COVID-19 prior to traveling to Singapore. The Fairtex athlete had been in close contact with the cornerman, so he's been removed from ONE: BATTLEGROUND III due to Singapore's health and safety protocols. With both of their opponents out, Sitthichai and Tawanchai have agreed to compete in a ONE Super Series featherweight Muay Thai contest.

The card also featured a strawweight bout between former ONE Strawweight Champion Dejdamrong Sor Amnuaysirichoke and Banma Duoji.

An atomweight bout between Bi Nguyen and Jenelyn Olsim was scheduled for the event.

=== Results ===
ONE: Battleground 3
| Weight Class | | | | Method | Round | Time | Notes |
|---|---|---|---|---|---|---|---|
| Featherweight 70 kg | (Thailand) Sitthichai Sitsongpeenong | def. | (Thailand) Tawanchai P.K. Saenchaimuaythaigym | Decision (Split) | 3 | 5:00 | Muay Thai |
| Catchweight 57.7 kg | (Thailand) Dejdamrong Sor Amnuaysirichoke | def. | (China) Banma Duoji | TKO (Elbows and Knees) | 2 | 3:31 | |
| Flyweight 61 kg | (China) Xie Wei | def. | (South Korea) Dae Hwan Kim | TKO (Punches) | 3 | 1:46 | |
| W.Atomweight 52 kg | (Philippines) Jenelyn Olsim | def. | (Vietnam) Bi Nguyen | Decision (Unanimous) | 3 | 3:00 | |
| Bantamweight 66 kg | (South Korea) Song Min Jong | def. | (Myanmar) Tial Thang | Decision (Unanimous) | 3 | 5:00 | |
| Bantamweight 66 kg | (Mongolia) Purev Otgonjargal | def. | (England) Ben Royle | KO (Punches) | 1 | 0:49 | |

== Road to ONE: RUF 43 ==
Road to ONE: RUF 43
- Promotion: ONE Championship
- Date: August 29, 2021
- Venue: Celebrity Theatre
- City: Phoenix, Arizona, United States

Road to ONE: RUF 43 will be a mixed martial arts event held by ONE Championship in partnership with RUF Nation on August 29, 2021, at the Celebrity Theatre in Phoenix, Arizona, United States.

=== Results ===
Road to ONE
| Weight Class | | | | Method | Round | Time | Notes |
|---|---|---|---|---|---|---|---|
| Heavyweight 120 kg | (Dominican Republic) Waldo Cortes-Acosta | def. | (United States) Jordan Powell | Decision (Unanimous) | 3 | 5:00 | RUF MMA Road to ONE Quarter-finals |
| Heavyweight 120 kg | (United States) Cameron Chism-Brungard | def. | (United States) Ellery Tarazon | KO/TKO | 1 | 0:43 | RUF MMA Road to ONE First round |
| Lightweight 70 kg | (United States) David Bollea | def. | (United States) Gabe Rodriguez | Submission (Rear-naked choke) | 1 | 1:24 | |
| Bantamweight 61 kg | (United States) Chris Mangiapili | def. | (United States) Eric Duong | Decision (Unanimous) | 3 | 3:00 | Amateur bout |
| Lightweight 70 kg | (United States) Alessandro Rodriguez | def. | (United States) La'Monte Jordan | KO (head kick) | 2 | | Amateur bout |
| Middleweight 84 kg | (United States) Stephan Martinez | def. | (United States) Brandon Aponte | Submission (Rear-naked choke) | 1 | 0:46 | Amateur bout |
| Welterweight 77 kg | (United States) Adrian Galindo | def. | (United States) Justin Musgrove | Submission (Rear-naked choke) | 2 | 2:44 | Amateur bout |
| Flyweight 57 kg | (United States) Alex Carrillo | def. | (United States) Mark Courson | KO/TKO | 1 | 0:28 | Amateur bout |
| Middleweight 84 kg | (United States) Duy Pham | def. | (United States) Patrick Williams | Submission (Rear-naked choke) | 3 | 1:56 | Amateur bout |

== ONE Championship: Empower ==
ONE Championship: Empower
- Promotion: ONE Championship
- Date: September 3, 2021
- Venue: Singapore Indoor Stadium
- City: Singapore

ONE Championship: Empower (also known as ONE 142: Xiong vs. Nicolini) was a Combat sport event held by ONE Championship on September 3, 2021. It was originally scheduled for May 28, 2021, at the Singapore Indoor Stadium in Kallang, Singapore, before being postponed due to the COVID-19 pandemic. The event was later rescheduled for September 3.

=== Background ===
For the first time of this organization's history, this event was featured all-female event on a fight card.

ONE Women's Strawweight World Champion Xiong Jing Nan returned to the ring to defend her belt for the fifth time as faced Michelle Nicolini May 28. The fight was the headliner of an all-women card. After her loss to Bi Nguyen at ONE Championship: Dangal, Ritu Phogat was removed from the Women's Atomweight Grand Prix. She was later reinstated in the Atomweight Grand Prix. Initially, Julie Mezabarba took Phogat's place before the latter was reinstated to the Grand Prix. Meksen was rescheduled to face Cristina Morales.

The event will feature the complete opening round of the Women's Atomweight Grand Prix.

Jackie Buntan was scheduled to face Daniela Lopez in a strawweight muay thai bout.

An atomweight bout between Mei Yamaguchi and Julie Mezabarba was scheduled as the opening fight of the card, as well as the World Grand Prix alternate bout.

=== Results ===
ONE: Empower
| Weight Class | | | | Method | Round | Time | Notes |
|---|---|---|---|---|---|---|---|
| W.Strawweight 57 kg | (China) Xiong Jingnan (c) | def. | (Brazil) Michelle Nicolini | Decision (Unanimous) | 5 | 5:00 | For the ONE Women's Strawweight Championship |
| W.Atomweight 52 kg | (South Korea) Seo Hee Ham | def. | (Philippines) Denice Zamboanga | Decision (Split) | 3 | 5:00 | Atomweight Grand Prix Quarter-finals |
| W.Atomweight 52 kg | (Thailand) Stamp Fairtex | def. | (Ukraine) Alyona Rassohyna | Decision (Split) | 3 | 5:00 | Atomweight Grand Prix Quarter-finals |
| W.Atomweight 52 kg | (India) Ritu Phogat | def. | (China) Meng Bo | Decision (Unanimous) | 3 | 5:00 | Atomweight Grand Prix Quarter-finals |
| W.Atomweight 52 kg | (Japan) Itsuki Hirata | def. | (United States) Alyse Anderson | Decision (Unanimous) | 3 | 5:00 | Atomweight Grand Prix Quarter-finals |
| W.Atomweight 52 kg | (France) Anissa Meksen | def. | (Spain) Cristina Morales | TKO (Punches) | 2 | 2:27 | Kickboxing |
Lead Card
| W.Strawweight 57 kg | (United States) Jackie Buntan | def. | (Argentina) Daniela Lopez | Decision (Unanimous) | 3 | 3:00 | Muay Thai |
| W.Atomweight 52 kg | (Brazil) Julie Mezabarba | def. | (Japan) Mei Yamaguchi | Decision (Unanimous) | 3 | 5:00 | Atomweight Grand Prix Alternate Bout |

== ONE Championship: Revolution ==
ONE Championship: Revolution
- Promotion: ONE Championship
- Date: September 24, 2021
- Venue: Singapore Indoor Stadium
- City: Singapore

ONE Championship: Revolution (also known as ONE 143: Lee vs. Ok) was a Combat sport event held by ONE Championship on September 24, 2021, at the Singapore Indoor Stadium in Kallang, Singapore.

=== Background ===
The event featured 3 title fight. ONE Lightweight World Champion Christian Lee defended his belt against #3-ranked Ok Rae-yoon as the main event. In the co main event ONE Bantamweight Kickboxing World Champion Capitan Petchyindee Academy defended his crown against Mehdi Zatout and a trilogy fight ONE Strawweight World Champion Joshua Pacio and #1-ranked Yosuke Saruta.

=== Results ===
ONE: Revolution
| Weight Class | | | | Method | Round | Time | Notes |
|---|---|---|---|---|---|---|---|
| Lightweight 77 kg | (South Korea) Ok Rae-yoon | def. | (United States) Christian Lee (c) | Decision (Unanimous) | 5 | 5:00 | For the ONE Lightweight Championship |
| Bantamweight 66 kg | (Thailand) Capitan Petchyindee Academy (c) | def. | (France) Mehdi Zatout | Decision (Unanimous) | 5 | 3:00 | For the ONE Kickboxing Bantamweight Championship |
| Strawweight 57 kg | (Philippines) Joshua Pacio (c) | def. | (Japan) Yosuke Saruta | TKO (Punches) | 1 | 3:38 | For the ONE Strawweight Championship |
| Featherweight 70 kg | (South Korea) Kim Jae Woong | def. | (Australia) Martin Nguyen | KO (Punches) | 1 | 3:15 | |
| Heavyweight 120 kg | (Russia) Anatoly Malykhin | def. | (Iran) Amir Aliakbari | KO (Punches) | 1 | 2:57 | |
| W.Atomweight 52 kg | (United States) Victoria Lee | def. | (Brazil) Victoria Souza | TKO (Punches) | 2 | 3:58 | |
Lead Card
| Strawweight 57 kg | (Philippines) Lito Adiwang | def. | (China) Hexigetu | Decision (Unanimous) | 3 | 5:00 | |
| Flyweight 61 kg | (Japan) Taiki Naito | def. | (Thailand) Petchdam | Decision (Split) | 3 | 3:00 | Muay Thai |
| Heavyweight 120 kg | (Brazil) Marcus Almeida | def. | (Brazil) Anderson Silva | Submission (North-South Choke) | 1 | 2:55 | |
| Bantamweight 66 kg | (Thailand) Petchtanong Petchfergus | def. | (China) Zhang Chenglong | Decision (Unanimous) | 3 | 3:00 | Kickboxing |
| Featherweight 70 kg | (United States) James Yang | def. | (Philippines) Roel Rosauro | TKO (Punches) | 2 | 2:00 | |

== Road to ONE: Sexyama Edition ==
Road to ONE: Sexyama Edition
- Promotion: ONE Championship
- Date: October 5, 2021
- Venue: Tsutaya O-East
- City: Tokyo, Japan

Road to ONE: Sexyama Edition was a Combat sport event held by ONE Championship in partnership with Shooto on October 5, 2021, at the Tsutaya O-East in Tokyo, Japan.

=== Background ===
This edition of Road to ONE was the fifth edition held in Japan. A flyweight bout between Tatsumitsu Wada and Daichi Takenaka served as the main event.

=== Results ===
Road to ONE
| Weight Class | | | | Method | Round | Time | Notes |
|---|---|---|---|---|---|---|---|
| Flyweight 61 kg | (Japan) Tatsumitsu Wada | def. | (Japan) Daichi Takenaka | Decision (Split) | 3 | 5:00 | |
| Lightweight 77 kg | (Japan) Shinya Aoki | - | (Japan) Shutaro Debana | Draw (Time Expire) | 1 | 10:00 | Grappling Bout |
| Bantamweight 66 kg | (Japan) Kota Onojima | def. | (Japan) Seigo Yamamoto | Decision (Unanimous) | 3 | 5:00 | |
| Bantamweight 66 kg | (Japan) Sora Yamamoto | def. | (Japan) Yasuyuki Nojiri | Decision (Unanimous) | 3 | 5:00 | |
| Bantamweight 66 kg | (Japan) Takuma Sudo | def. | (Japan) Kirato Haebara | Submission (Kneebar) | 2 | 1:06 | |
| Featherweight 70 kg | (Japan) Masuto Kawana | def. | (Japan) Takeki Niizeki | Submission (Rear-Naked Choke) | 3 | 3:35 | |

== Road to ONE: Muay Thai Grand Prix ==
Road to ONE: Muay Thai Grand Prix
- Promotion: ONE Championship
- Date: October 9, 2021
- Venue: The O2 Arena
- City: London, United Kingdom

Road to ONE: Muay Thai Grand Prix was a Combat sport event held by ONE Championship in partnership with Muay Thai Grand Prix promotion in October 2021 at The O2 Arena in London, United Kingdom.

=== Background ===
The event will feature a 4-man heavyweight qualification tournament to earn a sport in the Road to one Europe tournament.

=== Results ===
Road to ONE
| Weight Class | | | | Method | Round | Time | Notes |
|---|---|---|---|---|---|---|---|
| Heavyweight 120 kg | (England) Rhys Brudenell | def. | (Italy) Claudio Istrate | TKO | 1 | 2:40 | Kickboxing Heavyweight Tournament Final |
| Heavyweight 120 kg | (England) Rhys Brudenell | def. | (Poland) Alan Zomkowski | KO | 1 | 1:30 | Kickboxing Heavyweight Tournament Semi-final |
| Heavyweight 120 kg | (Italy) Claudio Istrate | def. | (Germany) Juergen Dolch | KO (punches) | 1 | 0:22 | Kickboxing Heavyweight Tournament Semi-final |
Muay Thai Grand Prix
| Lightweight 77 kg | (England) Jimmy Killick | def. | (England) Charlie O'Neill | Decision (Unanimous) | 3 | 3:00 | KGP British -76 kg Championship |
| Featherweight 70 kg | (England) Yves Brusnello | def. | (England) Rob Zabitis | TKO | 4 | 1:26 | KGP British -70 kg Championship |
| Featherweight 70 kg | (England) Luke Whelan | def. | (Greece) Penteleimon Samprovalakis | Decision (Unanimous) | 5 | 3:00 | KGP World Lightweight Championship |
| W.Bantamweight 63.5 kg | (England) Niamh Kinehan | def. | (England) Sarah Worsfold | Decision (Unanimous) | 5 | 3:00 | KGP World Super Lightweight Championship |
| W.Flyweight 59 kg | (England) Katie Rand | def. | (England) Tanya Merrett | Decision (Unanimous) | 5 | 3:00 | MTGP British -59 kg Championship |
| Flyweight 61 kg | (England) Liam Patel | def. | (England) Matty Holleran | Decision (Unanimous) | 5 | 3:00 | MTGP British -61 kg Championship |
| Featherweight 67 kg | (England) Solomon Lefleur | def. | (Portugal) Reinaldo Santos | KO | 3 | 0:37 | Kickboxing |
| Bantamweight 65 kg | (England) Liam Harrison | def. | (France) Brayan Matias | Decision (Unanimous) | 3 | 3:00 | Muay Thai |
| W.Strawweight 55 kg | (England) Iman Barlow | def. | (Italy) Sveva Melillo | Decision (Unanimous) | 5 | 3:00 | MTGP World Bantamweight Championship |
| W.Atomweight 52 kg | (England) Rosie Nasrin | def. | (England) Nicola Holme | Decision (Unanimous) | 5 | 3:00 | MTGP British -52 kg Championship |
| Middleweight 79 kg | (England) Dan Bonner | def. | (England) Marley Zwanenberg | Decision (Unanimous) | 5 | 3:00 | MTGP European -79 kg Championship |
| Bantamweight 65 kg | (England) Bailey Sugden | def. | (France) Matthieu Guevara | Decision (Unanimous) | 1 | 2:38 | Kickboxing |
| Bantamweight 63.5 kg | (England) Amro Ghanem | def. | (England) Tom Field | Decision (Unanimous) | 1 | 2:38 | Muay Thai |
| Featherweight 70 kg | (England) Tomas Davila | def. | (England) Jamie Lee Rayner | TKO | 1 | 2:38 | Muay Thai |
| W.Atomweight 52 kg | (England) Grace Spicer | def. | (Greece) Foiteini Nanou | Decision (Unanimous) | 3 | 3:00 | Muay Thai |

== ONE Championship: First Strike ==
ONE Championship: First Strike
- Promotion: ONE Championship
- Date: October 15, 2021
- Venue: Singapore Indoor Stadium
- City: Singapore

ONE Championship: First Strike (also known as ONE 145: Petrosyan vs. Superbon) was a Combat sport event held by ONE Championship on October 15, 2021, at the Singapore Indoor Stadium in Kallang, Singapore.

=== Background ===
Giorgio Petrosyan faced Superbon Banchamek to determine the inaugural ONE Featherweight Kickboxing Championship in the main event.

The event featured the complete opening round of the kickboxing Featherweight Grand Prix.

A heavyweight kickboxing bout between Rade Opacic and Patrick Schmid took place on the opening bout.

A bantamweight Muay Thai bout between Saemapetch Fairtex and Tawanchai P.K. Saenchaimuaythaigym was scheduled for the event prelims. However, the match did not take place at this event.

=== Results ===
ONE: First Strike
| Weight Class | | | | Method | Round | Time | Notes |
|---|---|---|---|---|---|---|---|
| Featherweight 70 kg | (Thailand) Superbon Banchamek | def. | (Italy) Giorgio Petrosyan | KO (Head Kick) | 2 | 0:20 | For the Inaugural ONE Kickboxing Featherweight Championship |
| Featherweight 70 kg | (Armenia) Marat Grigorian | def. | (Netherlands) Andy Souwer | TKO (Punches) | 2 | 2:26 | Kickboxing Featherweight Grand Prix Quarter-finals |
| Featherweight 70 kg | (Thailand) Sitthichai Sitsongpeenong | def. | (Netherlands) Tayfun Özcan | Decision (Split) | 3 | 3:00 | Kickboxing Featherweight Grand Prix Quarter-finals |
| Featherweight 70 kg | (Belarus) Chingiz Allazov | def. | (France) Samy Sana | KO (Punch to the Body) | 1 | 0:39 | Kickboxing Featherweight Grand Prix Quarter-finals |
| Featherweight 70 kg | (Georgia (country)) Davit Kiria | def. | (Germany) Enriko Kehl | TKO (Punches) | 1 | 2:50 | Kickboxing Featherweight Grand Prix Quarter-finals |
| Heavyweight 120 kg | (Serbia) Rade Opacic | def. | (Switzerland) Patrick Schmid | TKO (Knees) | 2 | 1:19 | Kickboxing |

== Road to ONE: RUF 44 ==
Road to ONE:RUF 44
- Promotion: ONE Championship
- Date: October 23, 2021
- Venue: Glendale Civic Center
- City: Glendale, Arizona, United States

Road to ONE: RUF 44 was a Combat sport event held by ONE Championship in partnership with RUF Nation on October 23, 2021, at the Glendale Civic Center in Glendale, Arizona, United States.

=== Results ===
Road to ONE
| Weight Class | | | | Method | Round | Time | Notes |
|---|---|---|---|---|---|---|---|
| Heavyweight 120 kg | (United States) Shannon Ritch | def. | (United States) Samson Guerrero | Submission (Rear-Naked Choke) | 1 | 1:20 | Grappling |
| Lightweight 70 kg | (United States) Austin Wourms | def. | (United States) Tony Pike | Submission (Armbar) | 1 | 0:20 | |
| Welterweight 77 kg | (United States) Sebastian Mordecai | def. | (United States) Dominico McIntosh | Decision (Unanimous) | 3 | 3:00 | Amateur |
| Featherweight 66 kg | (United States) Adam Franck | def. | (United States) Tim Carrillo | KO (Punches) | 1 | 0:10 | Amateur |
| Heavyweight 120 kg | (United States) Deran Martinez | def. | (United States) George Sopi | Decision (Unanimous) | 3 | 3:00 | RUF MMA Heavyweight Amateur title |

== ONE Championship: NextGen ==
ONE Championship: NextGen
- Promotion: ONE Championship
- Date: October 29, 2021
- Venue: Singapore Indoor Stadium
- City: Singapore

ONE Championship: NextGen (also known as ONE 145: Stamp vs. Mezabarba, Phogat vs. Olsim) was a Combat sport event held by ONE Championship on October 29, 2021, at the Singapore Indoor Stadium in Singapore.

=== Background ===
In the main event, Roman Kryklia was expected to defend the ONE Light Heavyweight Kickboxing World Championship against Murat Aygun. After Aygün withdrew due to injury, he was replaced by Iraj Azizpour and the main event was changed to a title fight for the inaugural ONE Heavyweight Kickboxing World Championship. After Kryklia withdrew from the fight due to a medical issue, Azizpour faced Anderson Silva in a non-title fight.

The event featured the semi-final round of the Women's Atomweight Grand Prix. Ritu Phogat was scheduled to face Itsuki Hirata, while Stamp Fairtex was scheduled to take on Seo Hee Ham. However, Ham had to pull out of her bout due to injury and was replaced by alternate bout winner Julie Mezabarba. Hirata then had to pull out of her fight due to a high fever and was replaced by Jenelyn Olsim.

A kickboxing light heavyweight bout between the WMC Muay Thai world champion Beybulat Isaev and the former Enfusion and Superkombat champion Bogdan Stoica took place at the event. Stoica, the younger brother of ONE kickboxing light heavyweight contender Andrei Stoica, made his promotional debut.

=== Fight Card ===
ONE: NextGen
| Weight Class | | | | Method | Round | Time | Notes |
|---|---|---|---|---|---|---|---|
| W.Atomweight 52 kg | (Thailand) Stamp Fairtex | def. | (Brazil) Julie Mezabarba | Decision (Unanimous) | 3 | 5:00 | Atomweight Grand Prix Semi-finals |
| W.Atomweight 52 kg | (India) Ritu Phogat | def. | (Philippines) Jenelyn Olsim | Decision (Unanimous) | 3 | 5:00 | Atomweight Grand Prix Semi-finals |
| Heavyweight 120 kg | (Iran) Iraj Azizpour | def. | (Brazil) Anderson Silva | Decision (Unanimous) | 3 | 3:00 | Kickboxing |
| Heavyweight 120 kg | (Belarus) Kiril Grishenko | def. | (Canada) Dustin Joynson | Decision (Unanimous) | 3 | 5:00 | |
| Strawweight 57 kg | (Philippines) Jeremy Miado | def. | (China) Miao Li Tao | TKO (Punches) | 2 | 0:50 | |
| Light Heavyweight 102 kg | (Russia) Beybulat Isaev | def. | (Romania) Bogdan Stoica | Decision (Unanimous) | 3 | 3:00 | Kickboxing |

== ONE Championship: NextGen 2 ==
ONE Championship: NextGen 2
- Promotion: ONE Championship
- Date: October 29, 2021 (aired November 12, 2021)
- Venue: Singapore Indoor Stadium
- City: Singapore

ONE Championship: NextGen 2 (also known as ONE 146: Saemapetch vs. Rittewada) was a Combat sport event held by ONE Championship on November 12, 2021, at the Singapore Indoor Stadium in Singapore.

=== Background ===
The main event featured a bantamweight muay thai bout between Rittewada Petchyindee Academy and Saemapetch Fairtex. The event also featured 2 grand prix alternate bout.

=== Results ===
ONE: NextGen 2
| Weight Class | | | | Method | Round | Time | Notes |
|---|---|---|---|---|---|---|---|
| Bantamweight 66 kg | (Thailand) Rittewada Petchyindee Academy | def. | (Thailand) Saemapetch Fairtex | TKO (Doctor Stoppage) | 2 | 2:10 | Muay Thai |
| Featherweight 70 kg | (China) Tang Kai | def. | (South Korea) Yoon Chang Min | TKO (Punches) | 1 | 4:03 | |
| Featherweight 70 kg | (Lithuania) Dovydas Rimkus | def. | (China) Zhang Chunyu | Decision (Majority) | 3 | 3:00 | ONE Kickboxing Featherweight Grand Prix Alternate Bout |
| Featherweight 70 kg | (Thailand) Jo Nattawut | def. | (Armenia) Yurik Davtyan | KO (Punch) | 1 | 2:50 | ONE Kickboxing Featherweight Grand Prix Alternate Bout |
| Catchweight 86 kg | (Japan) Hiroyuki Tetsuka | def. | (Malaysia) Agilan Thani | TKO (Punches) | 3 | 3:45 | |
| Bantamweight 66 kg | (China) Han Zihao | def. | (France) Victor Pinto | Decision (Unanimous) | 3 | 3:00 | Muay Thai |

== ONE Championship: NextGen 3 ==
ONE Championship: NextGen 3
- Promotion: ONE Championship
- Date: October 29, 2021 (aired November 26, 2021)
- Venue: Singapore Indoor Stadium
- City: Singapore

ONE Championship: NextGen 3 (also known as ONE 147: Adiwang vs. Brooks) was a Combat sport event held by ONE Championship on November 26, 2021, at the Singapore Indoor Stadium in Singapore.

=== Background ===
A strawweight bout between promotional newcomer Jarred Brooks and ONE veteran Lito Adiwang was scheduled for the event.

=== Results ===
ONE: NextGen 3
| Weight Class | | | | Method | Round | Time | Notes |
|---|---|---|---|---|---|---|---|
| Strawweight 57 kg | (United States) Jarred Brooks | def. | (Philippines) Lito Adiwang | Submission (Arm-Triangle Choke) | 2 | 3:07 | |
| Bantamweight 66 kg | (Russia) Alaverdi Ramazanov | def. | (Thailand) Pongsiri P.K.Saenchaimuaythaigym | KO (Punches) | 1 | 2:39 | Muay Thai |
| Strawweight 57 kg | (Brazil) Alex Silva | def. | (Philippines) Rene Catalan | Submission (Armbar) | 1 | 3:35 | |
| Flyweight 61 kg | (Thailand) Panpayak Jitmuangnon | def. | (Spain) Daniel Puertas | Decision (Unanimous) | 3 | 3:00 | Kickboxing |
| Lightweight 77 kg | (Kyrgyzstan) Ruslan Emilbek Uulu | def. | (Netherlands) Pieter Buist | Decision (Unanimous) | 3 | 5:00 | |
| Bantamweight 66 kg | (Brazil) Felipe Lobo | def. | (Thailand) Rodlek P.K. Saenchaimuaythaigym | Decision (Unanimous) | 3 | 3:00 | Kickboxing |

== ONE Championship: Winter Warriors ==
ONE Championship: Winter Warriors
- Promotion: ONE Championship
- Date: December 3, 2021
- Venue: Singapore Indoor Stadium
- City: Singapore

ONE Championship: Winter Warriors (also known as ONE 148: Eersel vs. Murtazaev, Stamp vs. Phogat) was a Combat sport event held by ONE Championship on December 3, 2021, at the Singapore Indoor Stadium in Singapore.

=== Background ===
This event featured a kickboxing title fights. In the headline attraction, the reigning ONE Kickboxing Lightweight Champion Regian Eersel will defend his title for the fourth time against Islam Murtazaev.

The co-main event featured the atomweight women's grand prix final between Stamp Fairtex and Ritu Phogat.

Bonus awards:

The following fighters were awarded bonuses:

- $50,000 Performance of the Night: Saygid Guseyn Arslanaliev, Timofey Nastyukhin

=== Results ===
ONE: Winter Warriors
| Weight Class | | | | Method | Round | Time | Notes |
|---|---|---|---|---|---|---|---|
| Lightweight 77 kg | (Suriname) Regian Eersel (c) | def. | (Russia) Islam Murtazaev | Decision (Split) | 5 | 3:00 | For the ONE Kickboxing Lightweight Championship |
| W.Atomweight 52 kg | (Thailand) Stamp Fairtex | def. | (India) Ritu Phogat | Submission (Armbar) | 2 | 2:14 | Atomweight Grand Prix Final |
| Bantamweight 66 kg | (Japan) Hiroki Akimoto | def. | (China) Qiu Jianliang | Decision (Unanimous) | 3 | 3:00 | Kickboxing |
| Lightweight 77 kg | (Turkey) Saygid Guseyn Arslanaliev | def. | (Russia) Timofey Nastyukhin | TKO (Punches) | 3 | 0:49 | |
| Heavyweight 120 kg | (Brazil) Marcus Almeida | def. | (South Korea) Kang Ji Won | Submission (Rear-Naked Choke) | 1 | 2:27 | |
| Flyweight 61 kg | (Japan) Yuya Wakamatsu | def. | (China) Hu Yong | Decision (Unanimous) | 3 | 5:00 | |

== Road to ONE: Mix Fight 49 ==
Road to ONE: Mix Fight 49
- Promotion: ONE Championship
- Date: December 4, 2021
- Venue: Dinamo Sport Complex
- City: Yerevan, Armenia

Road to ONE: Mix Fight 49 was a Combat sport event held by ONE Championship in partnership with Mix Fight Events promotion on December 4, 2021, at the Dinamo Sport Complex in Yerevan, Armenia.

=== Background ===
The event will feature a 4-man heavyweight qualification tournament to earn a sport in the Road to one Europe tournament.

=== Results ===
Road to ONE
| Weight Class | | | | Method | Round | Time | Notes |
|---|---|---|---|---|---|---|---|
| Strawweight 57 kg | (Armenia) Vartan Asatryan | def. | (Iran) Mikaeil Mehrjo | Submission (Armbar) | 1 | 2:39 | |
| Heavyweight 120 kg | (Russia) Sergey Kopachev | def. | (Iran) Niknam Haghparast | Decision (Unanimous) | 3 | 3:00 | Kickboxing Heavyweight Tournament Final |
| Catchweight 59 kg | (Armenia) Narek Avagyan | def. | (Iran) Iman Hosseinwand | TKO (Punches) | 2 | 2:53 | |
| Catchweight 86 kg | (Armenia) Arman Sahakyan | def. | (Iran) Nima Jarian | KO (Punches) | 1 | 0:08 | For the OMMAE 86 kg Championship |
| Catchweight 60 kg | (Armenia) Gor Nazaryan | def. | (Iran) Mohammed Hadian | KO (Punch) | 2 | 0:22 | Kickboxing |
| Heavyweight 120 kg | (Iran) Niknam Haghparast | def. | (Armenia) Ashot Begzadyan | TKO (Knees and Punches) | 1 | 2:37 | Kickboxing Heavyweight Tournament Semi-final |
| Heavyweight 120 kg | (Russia) Sergey Kopachev | def. | (Georgia (country)) Nika Kulumbegashvili | Decision (Unanimous) | 3 | 3:00 | Kickboxing Heavyweight Tournament Semi-final |
| Catchweight 74 kg | (Armenia) Davit Hayrapetyan | def. | (Armenia) Armen Grigoryan | KO | 2 | | Kickboxing |
Preliminary Card
| Catchweight 71 kg | (Armenia) Rafik Hakobyan | def. | (Iran) Bijan Kasanipour | KO (Punch) | 1 | | |
| Welterweight 84 kg | (Armenia) Hakob Ordanyan | def. | (Iran) Ali Mahro Bakhtiari | TKO | 2 | | |
| Strawweight 57 kg | (Armenia) Sergey Harutyunyan | def. | (Iran) Sadegh Ardakani | Decision (Unanimous) | 3 | 5:00 | |
| Catchweight 86 kg | (Armenia) Gagik Grigoryan | def. | (Iran) Seyed Morteza | TKO (Punches) | 1 | | |
| Catchweight 83 kg | (Armenia) Vazgen Qocharyan | def. | (Iran) Abdollah Asadipou | Decision (Unanimous) | 3 | 5:00 | |
| Catchweight 75 kg | (Armenia) Arman Galstyan | def. | (Armenia) Argam Galoyan | KO | 2 | | Kickboxing |
| Catchweight 60 kg | (Armenia) Roman Sedrakyan | def. | (Armenia) Hayk Vardanyan | Decision (Unanimous) | 3 | 3:00 | Kickboxing |

== ONE Championship: Winter Warriors 2 ==
ONE Championship: Winter Warriors 2
- Promotion: ONE Championship
- Date: December 3, 2021 (aired December 17, 2021)
- Venue: Singapore Indoor Stadium
- City: Singapore

ONE Championship: Winter Warriors 2(also known as ONE 149: Kingad vs. Akhmetov and ONE 149: Philippines vs. the World) was a Combat sport event held by ONE Championship on December 17, 2021, at the Singapore Indoor Stadium in Singapore.

=== Background ===
A flyweight bout between the #2 ranked flyweight contender Danny Kingad and the #4 ranked Kairat Akhmetov was scheduled as the main event.

A bantamweight bout between Kwon Won Il and the former ONE bantamweight champion Kevin Belingon was scheduled as the co-main event.

Vitaly Bigdash and Fan Rong were scheduled to fight in a -95 kg catchweight bout.

Bonus awards:

The following fighters were awarded bonuses:

- $50,000 Performance of the Night:

=== Results ===
ONE: Winter Warriors 2
| Weight Class | | | | Method | Round | Time | Notes |
|---|---|---|---|---|---|---|---|
| Flyweight 61 kg | (Kazakhstan) Kairat Akhmetov | def. | (Philippines) Danny Kingad | Decision (Unanimous) | 3 | 5:00 | |
| Bantamweight 66 kg | (South Korea) Kwon Won Il | def. | (Philippines) Kevin Belingon | KO (Punch to the Body) | 2 | 0:52 | |
| Catchweight 95 kg | (Russia) Vitaly Bigdash | def. | (China) Fan Rong | Submission (Guillotine Choke) | 3 | 0:41 | |
| Welterweight 84 kg | (Russia) Murad Ramazanov | def. | (Sweden) Zebaztian Kadestam | Decision (Unanimous) | 3 | 5:00 | |
| Bantamweight 66 kg | (Philippines) Stephen Loman | def. | (Russia) Yusup Saadulaev | TKO (Punches) | 1 | 4:09 | |
| Bantamweight 66 kg | (Philippines) Jhanlo Mark Sangiao | def. | (Indonesia) Paul Lumihi | Submission (Rear-Naked Choke) | 1 | 1:41 | |
Lead Card
| Lightweight 77 kg | (Germany) Arian Sadiković | def. | (Morocco) Mustapha Haida | Decision (Unanimous) | 3 | 3:00 | Kickboxing |
| Bantamweight 66 kg | (Brazil) Fabrício Andrade | def. | (China) Li Kai Wen | TKO (Punches) | 1 | 4:41 | |
| Catchweight 57.85 kg | (Italy) Joseph Lasiri | def. | (Japan) Asahi Shinagawa | KO (Punch and Knee) | 1 | 2:05 | Muay Thai |

== Road to ONE: RUF 45 ==
Road to ONE:RUF 45
- Promotion: ONE Championship
- Date: December 18, 2021
- Venue: Celebrity Theatre
- City: Phoenix, United States

Road to ONE: RUF 45 will be a Combat sport event held by ONE Championship in partnership with RUF Nation on December 18, 2021, at the Celebrity Theatre in Phoenix, US.

=== Background ===
The event featured 2 quarter-finals to earn a sport in the semi-finals Road to one: RUF tournament.

=== Fight Card ===
Road to ONE: RUF 45
| Weight Class | | | | Method | Round | Time | Notes |
|---|---|---|---|---|---|---|---|
| Heavyweight 120 kg | (United States) Terrance Jean-Jacques | def. | (United States) Michael Quintero | Decision (Unanimous) | 3 | 3:00 | |
| Heavyweight 120 kg | (United States) Cameron Chism | def. | (United States) Samson Guerrero | TKO (Referee Stoppage) | 1 | 0:49 | |
| W.Featherweight 66 kg | (United States) Virginia Marvin | def. | (United States) Nes Lewis | Submission (Rear-Naked Choke) | 1 | 1:15 | Amateur |
| Bantamweight 61 kg | (United States) Jesus Borrego | def. | (United States) Patrick Quick Jr | Decision (Unanimous) | 3 | 3:00 | Amateur |
| Middleweight 84 kg | (United States) Barry Hedgebeth | def. | (United States) Albe Tremblay | Decision (Unanimous) | 3 | 3:00 | Amateur |
| Lightweight 70 kg | (United States) Derek Freda | def. | (United States) Danny Florez | KO (Strike) | 1 | 1:21 | Amateur |
| Lightweight 70 kg | (United States) Tanner Trammel | def. | (United States) Jeffry Isham | Decision (Unanimous) | 3 | 3:00 | Amateur |

== See also ==
- List of current ONE fighters
- 2021 in UFC
- 2021 in Bellator MMA
- 2021 in Rizin Fighting Federation
- 2021 in Absolute Championship Akhmat
- 2021 in Konfrontacja Sztuk Walki
- 2021 in Fight Nights Global
- 2021 in Legacy Fighting Alliance
- 2021 in Glory
- 2021 in K-1
- 2021 in Romanian kickboxing
- 2021 in Wu Lin Feng
