= Marat Gafurov =

Russian mixed martial arts fighter

- Born: 21 November 1984 (age 41); Buynaksky, Dagestan ASSR, Russian SFSR, Soviet Union (now Buynaksky, Dagestan, Russia)
- Native name: Марат Гафуров
- Other names: Cobra
- Nationality: Russian
- Height: 5 ft 9 in (1.75 m)
- Weight: 170 lb (77 kg; 12 st)
- Division: Featherweight (2010, 2012–2017); Lightweight (2010–2012, 2018–2020) (Note: ONE Championship refers to their 155 lb class as Featherweight, but under the Association of Boxing Commissions in the United States, 155 lbs is considered Lightweight.); Welterweight (2020–present) (Note: ONE Championship refers to their 170 lb class as Lightweight, but under the Association of Boxing Commissions in the United States, 170 lbs is considered Welterweight.)
- Reach: 69 in (175 cm)
- Fighting out of: Makhachkala, Russia
- Team: Top Team Makhachkala; AKA Thailand
- Rank: Black belt in Brazilian Jiu-jitsu
- Years active: 2010–Present

Mixed martial arts record
- Total: 24
- Wins: 20
- By knockout: 2
- By submission: 13
- By decision: 5
- Losses: 4
- By knockout: 2
- By submission: 1
- By decision: 1

Other information
- Mixed martial arts record from Sherdog

Marat Gafurov (Russian: Марат Гафуров; born November 21, 1984) is a Russian professional mixed martial artist, who competes in the Featherweight and Lightweight divisions of Absolute Championship Akhmat (ACA). A professional MMA competitor for 12 years, Gafurov competed for the M-1 Global and ONE Championship, where he was the former M-1 Global Featherweight Champion and ONE Featherweight World Champion.

== Mixed martial arts career ==
=== Early career ===
Gafurov made his debut at Krasnodar Challenger Cup - Mix Fight 3 on June 4, 2010, against Shamil Gadzhiev. he won a fight by Submission in first round.

=== M-1 Global ===
Gafurov faced Vugar Bakhshiev for the inaugural M-1 Global Featherweight Championship at M-1 Challenge 35 on November 15, 2012, in Saint Petersburg, Russia. He won by a first round Submission.

=== ONE Championship ===
Gafurov made his ONE debut against Rob Lisita in the main event of ONE FC: Roar of the Tigers on October 17, 2014. He won by first-round submission.

Gafurov faced Ev Ting at ONE: Warrior's Quest on May 22, 2015. He defeated Ting via first-round submission.

==== ONE Featherweight World Champion ====
Gafurov received his first title shot when he faced Martin Nguyen for the interim ONE Featherweight World Championship at ONE: Odyssey of Champions on September 27, 2015. Gafurov would set the record for fastest submission in ONE Championship history at 41 seconds and won the interim title.

Gafurov would face Jadamba Narantungalag in a title unification bout at ONE: Dynasty of Champions (Beijing II) on November 21, 2015. Gafurov won by fourth-round submission via rear-naked choke to become the undisputed ONE Featherweight World Champion.

Gafurov made his first title defense against Kazunori Yokota at ONE: Kingdom of Champions on March 27, 2016. He won by second-round submission via rear-naked choke to retain the ONE Featherweight World Championship.

Gafurov rematched Jadamba Narantungalag in his second title defense at ONE: Defending Honor on November 11, 2016. He defeated Narantungalag by first-round technical submission via rear-naked choke to retain the title.

Gafurov made his third title defense in a rematch against Martin Nguyen at ONE: Quest for Greatness on August 18, 2017. He lost the title by second-round technical knockout and suffered his first professional loss in MMA competition.

==== Post-title reign ====
After losing the ONE Featherweight title, Marat Gafurov faced Emilio Urrutia at ONE: Heroes of Honor on April 20, 2018. He defeated Urrutia by first-round technical submission via arm-triangle choke.

Gafurov suffered his second professional loss when he lost to Koyomi Matsushima by first-round technical knockout at ONE: Conquest of Heroes on September 22, 2018.

Marat Gafurov defeated Tetsuya Yamada by unanimous decision at ONE: For Honor on May 3, 2019.

==== Lightweight (170 lb) debut ====
Marat Gafurov made his Lightweight (170 lbs) debut against Iuri Lapicus at ONE: Warrior's Code on February 7, 2020, where he lost by first-round submission via rear-naked choke.

Gafurov defeated Lowen Tynanes by split decision at ONE: Collision Course on December 18, 2020.

Marat Gafurov lost to Ok Rae-Yoon by unanimous decision at ONE on TNT 3 on April 21, 2021.

On July 22, 2022, Marat Gafurov defeated Ariel Sexton by third-round technical knockout at ONE 159.

=== Absolute Championship Akhmat ===
On January 9, 2024 it was announced that Gafurov has signed a deal with Absolute Championship Akhmat (ACA).

Gafurov made his ACA debut against Gábor Boráros at ACA 172 on March 9, 2024, where he won by first-round submission via armbar.

== Professional grappling career ==
Gafurov will be representing Dagestan Combat Club in the 83 kg division at the AIGA Champions League qualifying round in Turkey on March 2–5, 2024.

== Championship and accomplishments ==
- ONE Championship
  - ONE Featherweight World Championship (One time)
    - Two successful defense
- M-1 Global
  - M-1 Global Featherweight Championship (One time)
    - Two successful defense

== Mixed martial arts record ==
Professional record breakdown
24 matches	20 wins	4 losses
By knockout	2	2
By submission	13	1
By decision	5	1

Res.	Record	Opponent	Method	Event	Date	Round	Time	Location	Notes
Win	20–4	Gábor Boráros	Submission (armbar)	ACA 172	March 9, 2024	1	2:55	Moscow, Russia	
Win	19–4	Ariel Sexton	TKO (punches)	ONE 159	July 22, 2022	3	4:15	Kallang, Singapore	
Loss	18–4	Ok Rae-yoon	Decision (unanimous)	ONE on TNT 3	April 21, 2021	3	5:00	Kallang, Singapore	
Win	18–3	Lowen Tynanes	Decision (split)	ONE: Collision Course	December 18, 2020	3	5:00	Kallang, Singapore	
Loss	17–3	Iuri Lapicus	Submission (rear-naked choke)	ONE: Warrior's Code	February 7, 2020	1	1:07	Jakarta, Indonesia	Welterweight debut.
Win	17–2	Tetsuya Yamada	Decision (unanimous)	ONE: For Honor	May 3, 2019	3	5:00	Jakarta, Indonesia	
Loss	16–2	Koyomi Matsushima	TKO (punches)	ONE: Conquest of Heroes	July 22, 2018	1	2:41	Jakarta, Indonesia	
Win	16–1	Emilio Urrutia	Technical Submission (arm-triangle choke)	ONE: Heroes of Honor	April 20, 2018	1	2:34	Pasay, Philippines	Return to Lightweight.
Loss	15–1	Martin Nguyen	KO (punch)	ONE: Quest for Greatness	August 18, 2017	2	1:27	Kuala Lumpur, Malaysia	Lost the ONE Featherweight Championship.
Win	15–0	Jadamba Narantungalag	Technical Submission (rear-naked choke)	ONE: Defending Honor	November 11, 2016	1	4:51	Kallang, Singapore	Defended the ONE Featherweight Championship.
Win	14–0	Kazunori Yokota	Submission (rear-naked choke)	ONE: Kingdom of Champions	May 27, 2016	2	4:25	Bangkok, Thailand	Defended the ONE Featherweight Championship.
Win	13–0	Jadamba Narantungalag	Submission (rear-naked choke)	ONE: Dynasty of Champions (Beijing II)	November 21, 2015	4	4:39	Beijing, China	Won and unified the ONE Featherweight Championship.
Win	12–0	Martin Nguyen	Submission (rear-naked choke)	ONE: Odyssey of Champions	September 27, 2015	1	0:41	Jakarta, Indonesia	Won the interim ONE Featherweight Championship.
Win	11–0	Ev Ting	Submission (rear-naked choke)	ONE: Warrior's Quest	May 22, 2015	1	4:30	Kallang, Singapore	
Win	10–0	Rob Lisita	Submission (rear-naked choke)	ONE FC: Roar of the Tigers	October 17, 2014	1	1:08	Kuala Lumpur, Malaysia	
Win	9–0	Lee Morrison	Decision (unanimous)	M-1 Challenge 47	April 4, 2014	5	5:00	Orenburg, Russia	Defended the M-1 Global Featherweight Championship. Later vacated title.
Win	8–0	Yuri Ivlev	TKO (punches)	M-1 Challenge 41	August 21, 2013	2	3:56	Saint Petersburg, Russia	Defended the M-1 Global Featherweight Championship.
Win	7–0	Vugar Bakhshiev	Submission (rear-naked choke)	M-1 Challenge 35	November 15, 2012	1	4:18	Saint Petersburg, Russia	Return to Featherweight. Won the inaugural M-1 Global Featherweight Championship.
Win	6–0	Joakhim Tapi	Submission (triangle choke)	Pride of Caucasus 2012	September 23, 2012	1	2:22	Khasavyurt, Russia	
Win	5–0	Mairbek Taisumov	Decision (split)	M-1 Global: Battle of The Legends 2	June 21, 2012	3	5:00	Saint Petersburg, Russia	
Win	4–0	David Kozma	Submission (rear-naked choke)	M-1 Challenge 31	March 16, 2012	2	2:10	Saint Petersburg, Russia	
Win	3–0	Sheikh-Magomed Arapkhanov	Decision (unanimous)	M-1 Challenge 29	November 19, 2011	3	5:00	Ufa, Russia	
Win	2–0	Yuri Vlasenko	Submission (rear-naked choke)	M-1 Selection Ukraine 2010: Round 6	November 6, 2010	1	1:18	Kyiv, Ukraine	Lightweight debut.
Win	1–0	Shamil Gadzhiev	Submission (armbar)	Krasnodar Challenger 3	June 4, 2010	1	3:10	Krasnodar, Russia	Featherweight debut.
