= Ok Rae-yoon =

South Korean mixed martial arts (MMA) fighter

- Born: March 23, 1991 (age 35); Busan, South Korea
- Height: 6 ft 0 in (1.83 m)
- Weight: 170 lb (77 kg; 12 st 2 lb)
- Division: Lightweight (ONE); Welterweight
- Reach: 75 in (191 cm)
- Fighting out of: Busan, South Korea
- Team: Busan Team MAD
- Years active: 2014–present

Mixed martial arts record
- Total: 23
- Wins: 17
- By knockout: 4
- By submission: 1
- By decision: 12
- Losses: 6
- By knockout: 2
- By decision: 4

Other information
- Mixed martial arts record from Sherdog

Ok Rae-yoon (Korean: 옥래윤, born March 23, 1991) is a South Korean mixed martial artist. He competed in the Lightweight division of ONE Championship, where he was the former ONE Lightweight World Champion.

== Mixed martial arts career ==
=== Early career ===
Ok started his professional MMA career in 2014 and mainly fought in East Asia, particularly Wu Lin Feng. He amassed a record of 13–3 prior to being signed by ONE Championship.

=== ONE Championship ===
Ok faced Marat Gafurov at ONE on TNT 3 on April 21, 2021. He won the bout by unanimous decision.

Ok faced Eddie Alvarez at ONE on TNT 4 on April 28, 2021. He won a close bout via unanimous decision.

==== ONE Lightweight Champion ====
Ok faced defending ONE Lightweight World Champion Christian Lee at ONE Championship: Revolution on September 24, 2021. He won the fight by a unanimous decision to win the title. Due to the controversial nature of the decision, it was reviewed by the ONE Competition Committee which ultimately upheld the result.

Ok faced Lee in a rematch on August 26, 2022, at ONE 160. He lost the bout after being dropped by Lee in the second round and being finished on the ground with knees.

Ok faced Lowen Tynanes at ONE Fight Night 10 on May 5, 2023. He won the bout via unanimous decision.

Ok faced Alibeg Rasulov for the interim ONE Lightweight World Championship on July 6, 2024, at ONE Fight Night 23. He lost the bout by unanimous decision.

== Championships and accomplishments ==
- ONE Championship
  - ONE Lightweight World Championship (One time)
  - 2021 MMA Fighter of the Year
- Double G Fighting Championship
  - Double G FC Lightweight Championship (One time)
- HEAT
  - HEAT Lightweight Championship (One time)
    - One successful title defense
  - HEAT Lightweight Tournament winner
- Fight Matrix
  - 2021 Most Improved Fighter of the Year

== Mixed martial arts record ==
Professional record breakdown
23 matches	17 wins	6 losses
By knockout	4	2
By submission	1	0
By decision	12	4

Res.	Record	Opponent	Method	Event	Date	Round	Time	Location	Notes
Loss	17–6	Lucas Gabriel	Decision (split)	ONE Fight Night 44	June 27, 2026	3	5:00	Bangkok, Thailand	
Loss	17–5	Alibeg Rasulov	Decision (unanimous)	ONE Fight Night 23	July 6, 2024	5	5:00	Bangkok, Thailand	For the interim ONE Lightweight Championship (170 lb). Rasulov failed hydration test and was ineligible for the title.
Win	17–4	Lowen Tynanes	Decision (unanimous)	ONE Fight Night 10	May 5, 2023	3	5:00	Broomfield, Colorado, United States	
Loss	16–4	Christian Lee	TKO (knees)	ONE 160	August 26, 2022	2	1:00	Kallang, Singapore	Lost the ONE Lightweight Championship (170 lb).
Won	16–3	Christian Lee	Decision (unanimous)	ONE: Revolution	September 24, 2021	5	5:00	Kallang, Singapore	Won the ONE Lightweight Championship (170 lb).
Win	15–3	Eddie Alvarez	Decision (unanimous)	ONE on TNT 4	April 28, 2021	3	5:00	Kallang, Singapore	
Win	14–3	Marat Gafurov	Decision (unanimous)	ONE on TNT 3	April 21, 2021	3	5:00	Kallang, Singapore	Return to Welterweight.
Win	13–3	Ki Won-bin	Decision (unanimous)	Double G FC 5	November 28, 2020	3	5:00	Seoul, South Korea	Won the Double G FC Lightweight Championship.
Win	12–3	Burenzorig Batmunkh	Submission (rear-naked choke)	Double G FC 4	July 25, 2020	1	4:02	Seoul, South Korea	
Loss	11–3	Tom Santos	Decision (unanimous)	HEAT 44	March 2, 2019	5	5:00	Nagoya, Japan	Lost the HEAT Lightweight Championship.
Win	11–2	Norihisa Amimoto	Decision (unanimous)	NeoFight 14	October 20, 2018	2	5:00	Cheongpyeong, South Korea	
Win	10–2	Jack Becker	Decision (unanimous)	HEAT 42	March 27, 2018	5	5:00	Kariya, Japan	Defended the HEAT Lightweight Championship.
Loss	9–2	Burenzorig Batmunkh	Decision (unanimous)	Angel's Fighting 5	November 27, 2017	2	5:00	Seoul, South Korea	
Win	9–1	Yasuaki Kishimoto	Decision (unanimous)	HEAT 40	July 15, 2017	5	5:00	Nagoya, Japan	Won the HEAT Lightweight Tournament and the vacant HEAT Lightweight Championship.
Win	8–1	Park Eun-seok	TKO (flying knee and punches)	Angel's Fighting 3	April 29, 2017	1	0:55	Seoul, South Korea	Catchweight (159 lb) bout.
Win	7–1	Eiji Ishikawa	Decision (unanimous)	HEAT 39	February 19, 2017	3	5:00	Nagoya, Japan	HEAT Lightweight Tournament Semifinal.
Win	6–1	Meng Ding	Decision (unanimous)	WLF E.P.I.C. 6	July 23, 2016	3	5:00	Zhengzhou, China	Catchweight (165 lb) bout.
Win	5–1	Pu Zhang	TKO (doctor stoppage)	WLF E.P.I.C. 3	April 23, 2016	2	N/A	Zhengzhou, China	
Win	4–1	Gele Teri	TKO (punches)	WLF E.P.I.C. 2	March 13, 2016	1	N/A	Zhengzhou, China	Welterweight bout.
Win	3–1	Habiti Tuohetasheng	Decision (split)	WBK 5	July 31, 2015	3	5:00	Ningbo, China	Lightweight debut.
Loss	2–1	Song Yadong	KO (punch)	WBK 3	April 5, 2015	1	1:21	Ningbo, China	Featherweight debut.
Win	2–0	Lee Youn-hoon	TKO (punches)	Sun FC 2	July 28, 2014	2	1:05	Busan, South Korea	
Win	1–0	Kim Hyun	Decision	Sun FC 1	May 18, 2014	2	5:00	Busan, South Korea	Welterweight debut.

== See also ==
- List of male mixed martial artists
