= Celebrity Theatre =

Theatre in Phoenix, Arizona

Coordinates: 33.4544°N 112.0147°W

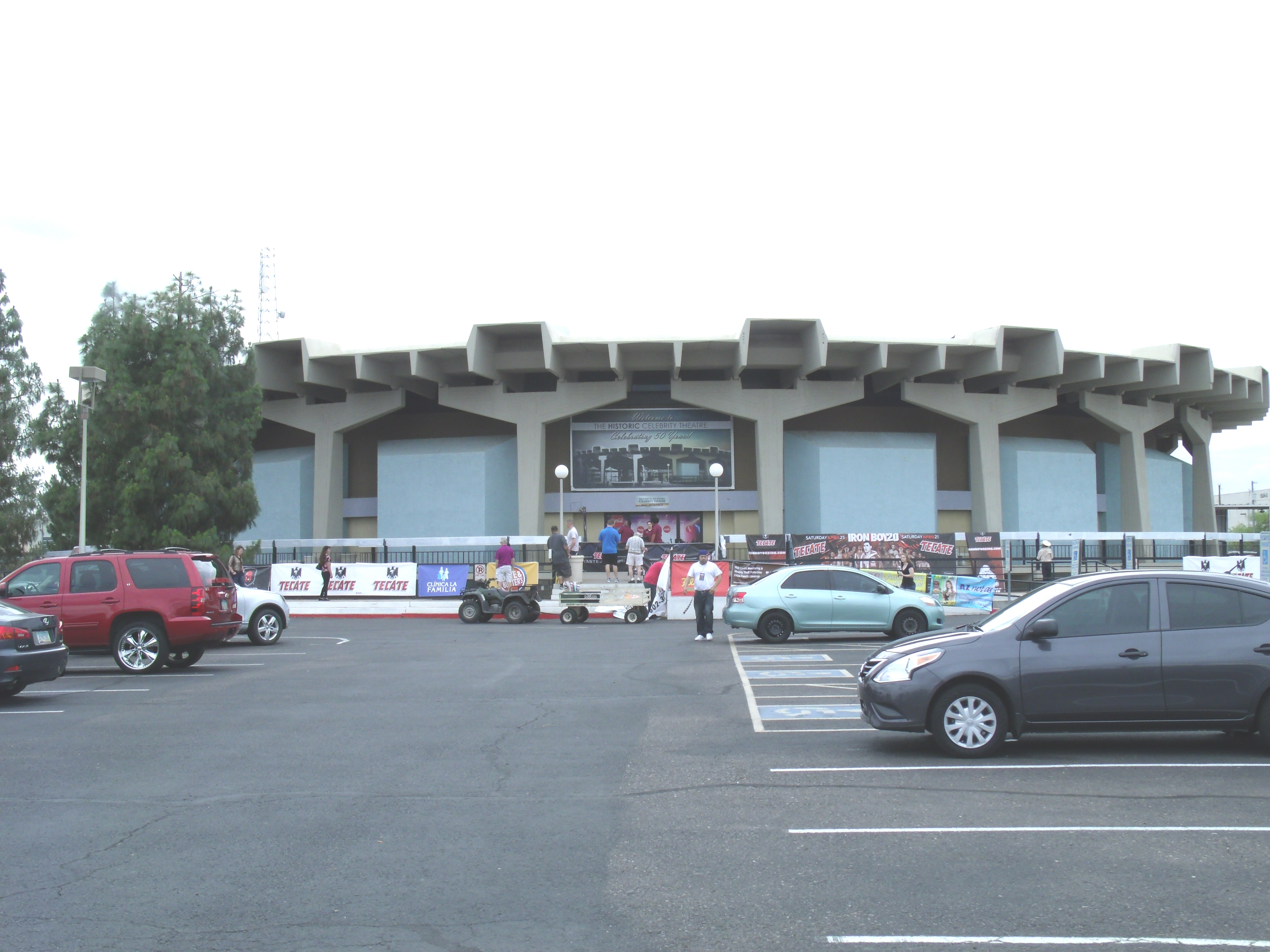
- Celebrity Theatre (once known as "Phoenix Star Theatre")
- Interactive map of Celebrity Theatre
- Former names: Phoenix Star Theatre (1963-1968); Travelodge Center (1968-1972)
- Address: 440 N 32nd Street; Phoenix, Arizona 85008; United States
- Owner: Heidi Hazelwood - Celebrity Theatre, LLC
- Capacity: 2,650
- Type: Theater in the round

Construction
- Opened: 1963
- Architect: Perry Neuschatz
- Structural engineer: T. Y. Lin International
- General contractor: E. L. Farmer Construction Company

Website
- www.celebritytheatre.com

Celebrity Theatre is a theater in the round located in Phoenix, Arizona.

== Construction and features ==
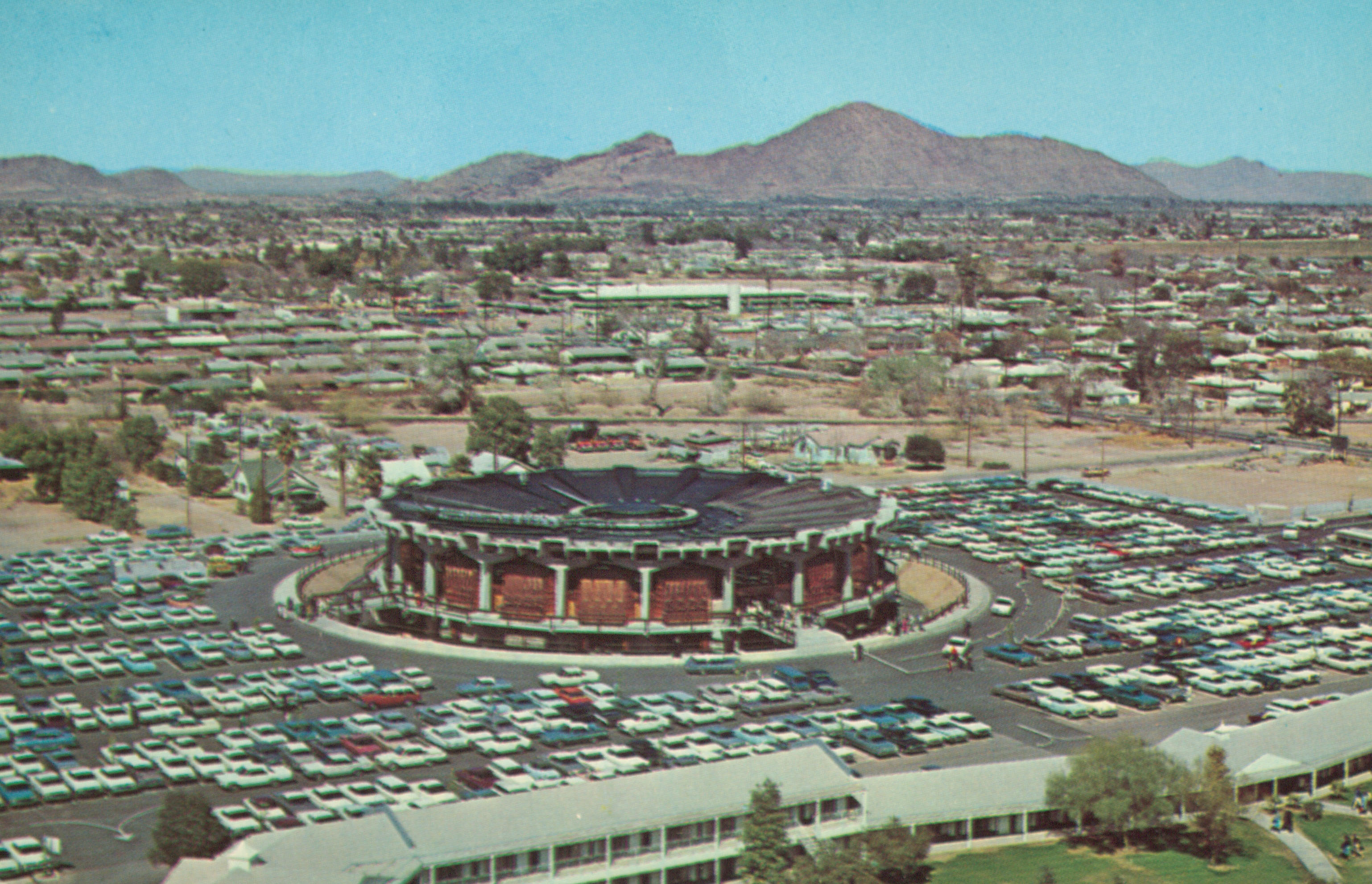
Theater in the 1960s when it was known as the "Phoenix Star Theatre"

Beverly Hills architect Perry Neuschatz designed the 196 foot-diameter building as a multipurpose conference and cultural center. He received the 1964 top award from the Prestressed Concrete Institute (PCI) for his outstanding design. Gary Call was the associate architect. T. Y. Lin International was the structural engineer and E. L. Farmer Construction Company was general contractor. Owners planned to use Celebrity Theatre as a concert venue during the winter. It was further renovated significantly in 1995. The venue underwent another significant renovation in 2021, replacing plumbing, redoing the restrooms, and reimagine the lower level. The lower level was renamed the Encore Lounge with a new bar and secondary stage for smaller acts. The building was listed on the Phoenix Historic Property Register in 2013 and the National Register of Historic Places in 2019.

The stage is 30 feet in diameter and completely round, exposed to the audience on all sides. An unusual feature of the theater is that the entire stage can turn through a complete revolution at a speed of up to 0.5 revolutions per minute, thus allowing everyone in the audience to see every part of the stage at some point during a two-hour performance. For the first six years of the theatre's operation, the stage had to be rotated manually after Liberace recommended that stage spin, before being upgraded to an electric motor in 1969. None of the 2650 seats in the theater are more than 70 feet from the stage. The theater is equipped with an orchestra pit and can be reconfigured as a proscenium stage if necessary, although this reduces the seating capacity by 25% to 50% depending on configuration.

== Notable performances ==
The theatre opened on January 13, 1964 with the musical South Pacific starring Betsy Palmer.

George Carlin filmed his second HBO special, George Carlin: Again!, here in 1978. It was considered the first stand-up comedy routine done "in the round".

In February 2013, Louis C.K. filmed his HBO special Oh My God, his fifth full-length comedy special. The round stage was made blue in color, to resemble the way it appeared when George Carlin filmed George Carlin: Again!.

In September 2022, Nate Bargatze filmed his special, Hello World, released in January 2023 on Amazon Prime Video.

Tom Segura filmed four sold-out shows in November 2022 for his Netflix special Tom Segura: Sledgehammer, released in 2023.

== See also ==
- Theater in the round
