= Kickboxing at the 2022 World Games – Qualification =

Kickboxing was one of the sports contested at the 2022 World Games in Birmingham, Alabama, United States. There were three weight classes for both men and women with a set number of competitors in each weight class qualifying for further competition.

== Qualification format ==
A total of six weight classes was held at the 2022 World Games in kickboxing. In each weight category there were eight competitors.

== Qualification summary ==
The following table summarises the outcome of qualification for the kickboxing tournament at the 2022 World Games. 29 nations gained at least one quota place for Birmingham.

NOC	Men			Women			Total
NOC	−63.5 kg	−75 kg	+91 kg	52 kg	−60 kg	−70 kg	Total
Austria					Yes		1
Azerbaijan			Yes				1
Belgium					Yes		1
Bosnia and Herzegovina			Yes				1
Brazil	Yes						1
Bulgaria	Yes						1
Canada				Yes			1
Croatia			Yes				1
Czech Republic		Yes					1
Finland			Yes		Yes	Yes	3
Germany					Yes		1
Israel		Yes		Yes			2
Italy		Yes				Yes	2
Kazakhstan	Yes						1
Kyrgyzstan	Yes						1
Lithuania		Yes					1
Mexico	Yes			Yes			2
Montenegro			Yes				1
Netherlands						Yes	1
Poland		Yes		Yes		Yes	3
Portugal	Yes				Yes		2
Romania					Yes		1
Russia	Yes		Yes			Yes	3
Serbia				Yes	Yes	Yes	3
Slovakia				Yes		Yes	2
Slovenia		Yes					1
Ukraine	Yes	Yes	Yes	Yes	Yes		5
United States		Yes		Yes		Yes	3
Venezuela			Yes				1
Total: 29 NOCs	8	8	8	8	8	8	48

== Men's events ==
=== −63.5 kg ===
Competition	Places	Qualified athletes
WT Rankings	8	Vinicius Oliveira Mestriner (BRA); Ognyan Mirchev (BUL); Chingiskhan Tlemissov (KAZ); Ikbol Fozilzhonov (KGZ); Miguel David Martínez Aceves (MEX); Tiago Santos (POR); Viktor Mikhailov (RUS); Orfan Sananzade (UKR)
Total	8	

=== −75 kg ===
Competition	Places	Qualified athletes
WT Rankings	8	Petr Dvořáček (CZE); Moshe Or (ISR); Alessio Zeloni (ITA); Henrikas Vikšraitis (LTU); Damian Piskorz (POL); Žiga Pečnik (SLO); Vitalii Dubina (UKR); Austin Bybee (USA)
Total	8	

=== +91 kg ===
Competition	Places	Qualified athletes
WT Rankings	8	Bahram Rajabzadeh (AZE); Ahmed Krnjić (BIH); Anto Širić (CRO); Pirkka Suksi (FIN); Miroslav Vujović (MNE); Asadulla Nasipov (RUS); Roman Shcherbatiuk (UKR); Oscar Higuera (VEN)
Total	8	

== Women's events ==
=== −52 kg ===
Competition	Places	Qualified athletes
WT Rankings	8	Stephanie Goode (CAN); Shir Cohen (ISR); Melissa Lisset Martinez Aceves (MEX); Iwona Nieroda-Zdziebko (POL); Staša Veić (SRB); Monika Chochlíková (SVK); Daryna Ivanova (UKR); Jenine Pilla (USA)
Total	8	

=== −60 kg ===
Competition	Places	Qualified athletes
WT Rankings	8	Stella Hemetsberger (AUT); Hélène Connart (BEL); Katja Pöyhönen (FIN); Sila Roderburg (GER); Sofia Oliveira (POR); Andreea Cebuc (ROU); Milana Bjelogrlić (SRB); Alina Martyniuk (UKR)
Total	8	

=== -70 kg ===
Competition	Places	Qualified athletes
WT Rankings	8	Vivre Vanhakoski (FIN); Nicole Carassiti (ITA); Dajenka Meijer (NED); Kamila Bałanda (POL); Valeriia Zubchenko (RUS); Aleksandra Krstić (SRB); Alexandra Filipová (SVK); Amanda Ginski (USA)
Total	8	
