= Eva Guillot =

French kickboxer (born 1998)

- Born: 18 April 1998 (age 28); Alboussière, France
- Height: 1.67 m (5 ft 5 1/2 in)
- Weight: 57 kg (126 lb; 9 st 0 lb)
- Style: Kickboxing
- Stance: Orthodox
- Fighting out of: Alboussière, France
- Team: Boxing Crussol Team Guillot
- Trainer: Richard Guillot
- Years active: 2021 - present

Kickboxing record
- Total: 24
- Wins: 18
- By knockout: 0
- Losses: 6
- By knockout: 3

Eva Guillot (born April 18, 1998) is a French kickboxer. As of June 2024, she is ranked as the ninth best women's bantamweight kickboxer in the world by Beyond Kickboxing.

== Kickboxing career ==
Guillot faced Laura Pileri at Fight Night 10 on April 9, 2022. She won the fight by unanimous decision.

Guillot faced Nawel Vanweyenberg for the French National -56 kg K-1 title at Finale Championnat France Pro K1 on May 31, 2022. She won the fight by unanimous decision.

Guillot faced Emma Caballero at Fight Night 11 on June 25, 2022. She won the fight by unanimous decision.

Guillot faced Veronica Gallamini at Kick's Night 2022 on November 19, 2022. She won the fight by unanimous decision.

Guillot faced Emilie Petrovic at Master Fight on March 4, 2023. She won the fight by unanimous decision.

Guillot faced Elana Stievano for the ISKA European Featherweight (-57 kg) K-1 title at Night of the Gladiators VI on April 15, 2023. She won the fight by decision.

Guillot faced Nicole Schäfer at Fight Night One on June 24, 2023. She won the fight by decision.

Guillot faced the two-weight Enfusion champion Nina van Dalum for the FNO Featherweight (-57 kg) title on April 27, 2024. She suffered her first professional loss by unanimous decision.

Guillot faced Martine Michieletto at Oktagon Tsunami Edition on June 29, 2024. She lost the fight by unanimous decision.

Guillot faced Martina Di Franco at Kick's Night 2024 on November 30, 2024. She won the fight by unanimous decision.

Guillot faced the former K-1 Flyweight champion Antonia Prifti for the vacant ISKA Oriental rules World Featherweight (-57 kg) title at La Nuit des Gladiateurs VII on April 19, 2025. She lost the fight by a fourth-round technical knockout.

Guillot faced Dorcas Ollita for the vacant WAKO Pro K-1 European Lightweight (-59 kg) title at Phenix Boxing Only on May 24, 2025.

== Championships and accomplishments ==
- Fédération Française de Kickboxing, Muaythaï et Disciplines Associées
  - 2022 FFKMDA French National -56 kg K-1 Championship
- International Sport Kickboxing Association
  - 2023 ISKA European Featherweight (-57 kg) K-1 Championship
- World Kickboxing Network
  - 2026 WKN K-1 European Super Bantamweight (-58.5 kg) Champion

== Fight record ==
Kickboxing record
18 Wins (0 (T)KO's), 6 Losses, 0 Draws
Date	Result	Opponent	Event	Location	Method	Round	Time
2026-11-21	Win	(Portugal) Sofia Oliveira	Kick's Night 2026	Agde, France	Decision	5	3:00
Won the vacant WKN K-1 European Super Bantamweight (-58.5 kg) title.
2026-06-13	Win	(Italy) Giorgia Biagini	Nuit de l’Impact 10	Saintes, France	Decision	3	3:00
2026-04-25	Win	(France) Manon Leclerc	Bouc en Boxe 2	Bouc-Bel-Air, France	Decision	3	3:00
2026-03-28	Win	(Italy) Laura Recchia	Ladies Boxing Trophy	Saint-Priest, France	Decision (Unanimous)	3	3:00
2026-02-07	Loss	(Morocco) Aya Boutafala	La Nuit des Combattants 16	Mayenne, France	TKO (Doctor stoppage)	3	
2025-12-13	Loss	(France) Jeanne Huron	TKR 2025	Bezons, France	Decision	4	3:00
2025-10-18	Win	(Germany) Michelle Krumpietz	Fight Night One 22	Vichy, France	Decision (Unanimous)	3	3:00
2025-05-24	Loss	(Switzerland) Dorcas Ollita	Phenix Boxing Only	Saint-Julien-en-Genevois, France	TKO (Doctor stoppage)	5	
For the vacant WAKO Pro K-1 European Lightweight (-59 kg) title.
2025-04-19	Loss	(Greece) Antonia Prifti	La Nuit des Gladiateurs VII	Vernoux-en-Vivarais, France	TKO (Referee stoppage)	4	
For the vacant ISKA Oriental rules World Featherweight (-57 kg) title.
2024-11-30	Win	(Italy) Martina Di Franco	Kick's Night 2024	Agde, France	Decision (Unanimous)	3	3:00
2024-06-29	Loss	(Italy) Martine Michieletto	Oktagon Tsunami Edition	Rome, Italy	Decision (Unanimous)	3	3:00
2024-06-08	Win	(France) Celia Schroeder	Nuit de l’Impact 8	Saintes, France	Decision	3	3:00
2024-04-27	Loss	(Netherlands) Nina van Dalum	Fight Night One 18	Saint-Étienne, France	Decision	5	3:00
For the FNO Featherweight (-57 kg) title.
2023-12-09	Win	(Italy) Eleonora Parigi	Kick's Night 2023, Final	Agde, France	Decision	3	3:00
Wins the Kick's Night 2024 Girls -57kg Tournament.
2023-12-09	Win	(Greece) Maria Tsiplostefanaki	Kick's Night 2023, Semifinal	Agde, France	Decision	3	3:00
2023-11-04	Win	(France) Mélissa Osouf	Ascam Night	Clermont-Ferrand, France	Decision (Unanimous)	3	3:00
2023-06-24	Win	(Germany) Nicole Schäfer	Fight Night One 16	Chasse-sur-Rhône, France	Decision	3	3:00
2023-04-15	Win	(Italy) Elana Stievano	Night of the Gladiators VI	Vernoux-en-Vivarais, France	Decision	5	3:00
Wins the ISKA European Featherweight (-57 kg) K-1 title.
2023-03-04	Win	(France) Emilie Petrovic	Master Fight	Chalon-sur-Saône, France	Decision (Unanimous)	3	3:00
2022-11-19	Win	(Italy) Veronica Gallamini	Kick's Night 2022	Agde, France	Decision (Unanimous)	3	3:00
2022-06-25	Win	(Spain) Emma Caballero	Fight Night 11	Valence, France	Decision (Unanimous)	3	3:00
2022-05-31	Win	(France) Nawel Vanweyenberg	Finale Championnat France Pro K1	Paris, France	Decision (Unanimous)	5	3:00
Wins the French National -56 kg K-1 title.
2022-04-09	Win	(Italy) Laura Pileri	Fight Night 10	Saint-Étienne, France	Decision (Unanimous)	3	3:00
2021-12-11	Win	(Italy) Eleonora Parigi	Kick's Night 2021	Agde, France	Decision (Unanimous)	3	3:00
Legend: Win Loss Draw/No contest Notes

Amateur Kickboxing Record
30 Wins, 12 Losses
Date	Result	Opponent	Event	Location	Method	Round	Time
2022-05-12	Loss	(Turkey) Sultan Zilan	7th International Turkish Open Kickboxing World Cup, Tournament Quarterfinal	Istanbul, Turkey	Decision (Split)	3	2:00
2021-10-17	Loss	(United Kingdom) Tennessee Randall	2021 WAKO World Championships, Tournament Semifinal	Jesolo, Italy	Decision (Unanimous)	3	2:00
2021-10-15	Win	(Argentina) Lucia Fusco	2021 WAKO World Championships, Tournament Quarterfinal	Jesolo, Italy	Decision (Unanimous)	3	2:00
2019-08-01	Loss	(Slovakia) Lucia Cmarova	2019 EUSA Combat Championships, Tournament Quarterfinal	Zagreb, Croatia	Decision (Unanimous)	3	2:00
Legend: Win Loss Draw/No contest Notes

== See also ==
- List of female kickboxers
