= Michieletto =

Michieletto is a surname. Notable people with the surname include:

- Alessandro Michieletto (born 2001), Italian volleyball player
- Damiano Michieletto (born 1975), Italian stage and opera director
- Martine Michieletto (born 1992), Italian muay thai boxer and kickboxer
