= Débora Évora =

Portuguese kickboxer

- Born: Débora Évora Barbosa; February 9, 1998 (age 28); Lisbon, Portugal
- Other names: Debby
- Height: 1.72 m (5 ft 7 1/2 in)
- Weight: 55 kg (121 lb; 8.7 st)
- Style: Kickboxing
- Stance: Orthodox
- Fighting out of: Ponferrada, Spain
- Team: Mamba Fight Club
- Years active: 2017 - present

Kickboxing record
- Total: 28
- Wins: 20
- By knockout: 2
- Losses: 7
- By knockout: 0
- Draws: 1

Débora Évora (born February 9, 1998) is a Portuguese kickboxer. She is the reigning WAKO Pro and ISKA K-1 World Featherweight champion.

As of August 2023, she is ranked as the tenth best women's pound-for-pound kickboxer in the world by Beyond Kick.

== Kickboxing career ==
=== Early career ===
Évora faced the undefeated Montana Aerts at Senshi 15 on February 18, 2023. She won the fight by unanimous decision, with two scorecards of 30–28 and one scorecard of 29–28 in her favor.

Évora faced Nora Perez for the vacant WAKO-Pro Mediterranean K-1 Rules Faetherweight (-55 kg) championship at MFC Showdown 028: Girls Power on April 15, 2023. She captured the title by unanimous decision.

Évora faced Michaela Kerlehová for the vacant WAKO-Pro European K-1 Rules Faetherweight (-55 kg) championship at MFC Showdown 032 on August 5, 2023. She won her second WAKO title by unanimous decision.

=== GLORY ===
On October 9, 2023, it was reported that Évora had signed with Glory. She made her debut against Nina van Dalum at Glory 90 on December 23, 2023.

Évora faced Stella Hemetsberger at UAM Fight Night K1-PRO on February 24, 2024. She lost the fight by split decision.

Évora made his first WAKO-Pro European K-1 Rules Faetherweight (-55 kg) title defense against Marika Pagliaroli at "Until the Last Round" on April 14, 2024. She won the fight by a second-round knockout.

Évora challenged the ISKA K-1 World Featherweight champion Martine Michieletto at Oktagon: Valle D'Aosta on June 7, 2025, as a short notice replacement for Sarah Moussadak. She won the fight by a third-round knockout.

== Championships and accomplishments ==
- Mamba Fight Club
  - 2022 MFC International -55 kg Championship
    - One successful title defense
- World Association of Kickboxing Organizations
  - 2023 WAKO-Pro K-1 Mediterranean Featherweight (-55 kg) Championship
  - 2023 WAKO-Pro K-1 European Featherweight (-55 kg) Championship
    - One successful title defense
  - 2024 WAKO-Pro K-1 World Featherweight (-55 kg) Championship
- International Sport Karate Association
  - 2025 ISKA K-1 World Featherweight Championship

== Kickboxing and Muay Thai record ==
Kickboxing and muay thai record
20 Wins (2 (T)KO's), 7 Losses, 1 Draw
Date	Result	Opponent	Event	Location	Method	Round	Time
2026-06-18	Win	(Switzerland) Dorcas Ollita	FCE 5	Lisbon, Portugal	Decision (Unanimous)	3	3:00
2026-05-09	Win	(Spain) Lara Fernandez	MFC Showdown 052	Ponferrada, Spain	Decision (Unanimous)	3	3:00
2025-08-09	Win	(Netherlands) Miranda Zondervan	MFC Showdown 047	Ponferrada, Spain	Decision (Unanimous)	3	3:00
2025-06-07	Win	(Italy) Martine Michieletto	Oktagon: Valle D'Aosta	Courmayeur, Italy	KO (Straight ot the body)	3	
Wins the ISKA K-1 World Featherweight (-57kg) title.
2025-05-08	Win	(France) Lyndsey Thomas	FCE 4	Lisbon, Portugal	Decision (Unanimous)	3	3:00
2024-12-07	Win	(Italy) Anna Lia Moretti	MFC 042	Ponferrada, Spain	Decision (Unanimous)	3	3:00
2024-10-16	Loss	(Russia) Daria Kuvakina	Ural FC 8	Perm, Russia	Ext.R Decision	4	3:00
2024-08-10	Win	(Turkey) Zelal Şengür	MFC 040	Ponferrada, Spain	Decision (Unanimous)	5	3:00
Wins the vacant WAKO-Pro K-1 World Featherweight (-55 kg) title.
2024-04-14	Win	(Italy) Marika Pagliaroli	Until the Last Round	Rome, Italy	KO (Left hook)	2	
Defends the WAKO-Pro K-1 European Featherweight (-55 kg) title.
2024-02-24	Loss	(Austria) Stella Hemetsberger	UAM Fight Night K1-PRO	Abu Dhabi, United Arab Emirates	Decision (Split)	3	3:00
2023-12-23	Loss	(Netherlands) Nina van Dalum	Glory 90	Rotterdam, Netherlands	Decision (Unanimous)	3	3:00
2023-08-05	Win	(Czech Republic) Michaela Kerlehová	MFC Showdown 032	Ponferrada, Spain	Decision (Unanimous)	5	3:00
Wins the vacant WAKO-Pro K-1 European Featherweight (-55 kg) title.
2023-05-13	Draw	(France) Anaëlle Angerville	Choc Des Etoiles 7	Châteauneuf-les-Martigues, France	Decision	3	3:00
2023-04-15	Win	(Spain) Nora Perez	MFC Showdown 028: Girls Power	Ponferrada, Spain	Decision (Unanimous)	5	3:00
Wins the vacant WAKO-Pro Mediterranean K-1 Rules Featherweight (-55 kg) title.
2023-02-18	Win	(Netherlands) Montana Aerts	Senshi 15	Varna, Bulgaria	Decision (Unanimous)	3	3:00
2022-12-03	Win	(France) Nastasia Moreno	MFC 025	Ponferrada, Spain	Decision (Unanimous)	5	3:00
Defends the MFC International -55 kg title.
2022-10-22	Win	(Spain) Elena Goggin	Fight Rosa Pensa Rosa	Portugal	Decision (Unanimous)	3	3:00
2022-07-09	Win	(Spain) Luvi Gutierrez	XFS Segunda Edición	Spain	Decision (Unanimous)	3	3:00
2022-05-21	Win	(Spain) Nayeli Atzimba	MFC 019	Ponferrada, Spain	Decision (Unanimous)	5	3:00
Wins the MFC International -55 kg title.
2022-03-05	Win	(Spain) Elena Goggin	MFC 017	Ponferrada, Spain	Decision (Unanimous)	3	3:00
2021-12-18	Loss	(Spain) Anta Sanchez	MFC 016	Ponferrada, Spain	Decision (Unanimous)	3	3:00
2021-10-30	Loss	(Spain) Teresa Baos	MFC 015	Valdeorras, Spain	Decision	3	3:00
2021-06-05	Win	(Spain) Anta Sanchez	MFC 012	Ponferrada, Spain	Decision (Unanimous)	3	3:00
2019-07-27	Win	(China) Yang Yang	Wu Lin Feng 2019: WLF -67kg World Cup 2019-2020	Zhengzhou, China	Decision (Unanimous)	3	3:00
2018-11-24	Loss	(Belgium) Kelly Dianoko	Prime Time 9	Belgium	Decision	5	3:00
For the vacant ISKA European K-1 Super-featherweight (-59 kg) title.
2018-02-18	Win	(Portugal) Margarida Câmara	Never Give Up	Portugal	Decision (Unanimous)	3	3:00
2017-12-16	Win	(Portugal) Inês Zambujo	Brothers League Vl	Portugal	Decision (Majority)	3	3:00
2017-08-05	Loss	(Portugal) Rita Carvalho	K-1 Fight Festival	Portugal	Decision	3	3:00
Legend: Win Loss Draw/No contest Notes

== Karate Combat record ==
Professional record breakdown
2 matches	1 win	1 loss
By knockout	1	0
By decision	0	1

Res.	Record	Opponent	Method	Event	Date	Round	Time	Location	Notes
Win	1-1	Julia Stasiuk	TKO (punches)	Karate Combat 62	24 July 2026	2	0:52	Miami, Florida, United States	
Loss	0-1	Erica Santos	Decision (unanimous)	Karate Combat 58	5 December 2025	3	3:00	Doral, Florida, United States	

== See also ==
- List of female kickboxers
