= Dajenka Meijer =

Dutch kickboxer (born 2001)

- Born: 24 October 2001 (age 24); Netherlands
- Nationality: Dutch
- Height: 1.73 m (5 ft 8 in)
- Division: Openweight
- Style: Kickboxing
- Team: Team van der Giessen
- Trainer: Denis van der Giessen

Kickboxing record
- Total: 7
- Wins: 7

Dajenka Meijer (born 24 October 2001) is a Dutch kickboxer. She competed in Enfusion, where was the inaugural Enfusion Women's Openweight champion.

As of May 2024, she was ranked as the second best women's openweight kickboxer in the world by Beyond Kickboxing.

== Kickboxing career ==
Meijer faced Aleksandra Krstić on 11 June 2021, at Road to ONE: Arena Friday Night Fights 2. She won the fight by split decision.

Meijer faced Gina Weerdenburg on 10 July 2021, at Enfusion 101. She won the bout by unanimous decision.

Meijer became WAKO World Champion in 2021 in the B-division. This enabled her to qualify for the 2022 World Games. Ahead of the 2022 World Games, she competed at the Enfusion Gala at the MartiniPlaza. At the aforementioned World Games, in the bronze medal match, she lost to Virve Vanhakoski.

=== Enfusion bantamweight champion ===
Meijer faced Anique Hilgerink for the women's openweight title, at Enfusion 116 on 19 November 2022. She won the title by unanimous decision to become the inaugural openweight champion.

== Championships and accomplishments ==
=== Professional ===
- Enfusion
  - 2022 Enfusion Women's Openweight Championship (one defense)

=== Amateur ===
- World Association of Kickboxing Organizations
  - 2021 WAKO World Championships K-1 -70 kg (gold)

== Kickboxing record ==
Professional Kickboxing Record
7 Wins (0 (T)KOs), 0 Loss, 0 Draw
Date	Result	Opponent	Event	Location	Method	Round	Time
2023-06-17	Win	(Netherlands) Charon Purperhart	Enfusion 124	Groningen, Netherlands	Decision (Unanimous)	3	3:00
2023-05-16	Win	(Morocco) Ibtissam Kassrioui	Enfusion 122	Wuppertal, Germany	Decision (Unanimous)	5	3:00
Defends the Enfusion Women's Openweight Championship.
2022-12-16	Win	(Morocco) Ibtissam Kassrioui	Enfusion 117	Dubai, UAE	Decision (Unanimous)	3	3:00
2022-11-19	Win	(Netherlands) Anique Hilgerink	Enfusion 116	Groningen, Netherlands	Decision (Unanimous)	5	3:00
Wins the inaugural Enfusion Women's Openweight Championship.
2021-07-10	Win	(Netherlands) Gina Weerdenburg	Enfusion 101	Alkmaar, Netherlands	Decision (Unanimous)	3	3:00
2021-06-11	Win	(Serbia) Aleksandra Krstić	Road to ONE: Arena Friday Night Fights 2	Belgrade, Serbia	Decision (Split)	3	3:00
2020-10-09	Win	(Switzerland) Marian Scheidegger	Enfusion Cage Events 4	Alkmaar, Netherlands	Decision (Unanimous)	3	3:00
Legend: Win Loss Draw/No contest Notes

Amateur Kickboxing Record
Date	Result	Opponent	Event	Location	Method	Round	Time
2022-07-14	Loss	(Finland) Virve Vanhakoski	World Games 2022, Bronze Medal Fight	Birmingham, Alabama, USA	Decision (3:0)	3	2:00
2022-07-13	Loss	(Slovakia) Alexandra Filipova	World Games 2022, Semifinals	Birmingham, Alabama, USA	Decision (3:0)	3	2:00
2022-07-13	Win	(United States) Amanda Ginski	World Games 2022, Quarterfinals	Birmingham, Alabama, USA	Decision (2:1)	3	2:00
2021-10-	Win	(Serbia) Aleksandra Krstić	WAKO World Championships 2021, Final	Jesolo, Italy	Decision (3:0)	3	2:00
Wins the 2021 WAKO World Championship -70kg Gold Medal.
2021-10-	Win	(Finland) Virve Vanhakoski	WAKO World Championships 2021, Semifinals	Jesolo, Italy	Decision (2:1)	3	2:00
2021-10-	Win	(Italy) Nicole Carassiti	WAKO World Championships 2021, Quarterfinals	Jesolo, Italy	Decision (3:0)	3	2:00
2021-09-	Loss	(Serbia) Aleksandra Krstić	WAKO 26th Hungarian World Cup, Semifinals	Budapest, Hungary	Decision (2:1)	3	2:00
Wins the 26th WAKO Hungarian World Cup -70kg Silver Medal.
2021-09-	Win	(Israel) Polina Grossman	WAKO 26th Hungarian World Cup, Semifinals	Budapest, Hungary	Decision (3:0)	3	2:00
2021-04-	Win	(Turkey) Guluzar Kara	WAKO 6th Turkish Open European Cup, Final	Ankara, Turkey	Decision (2:1)	3	2:00
2021-04-	Win	(Turkey) Nursefa Bahram	WAKO 6th Turkish Open European Cup, Semifinals	Ankara, Turkey	Decision (3:0)	3	2:00
Legend: Win Loss Draw/No contest Notes
