= Dorcas Ollita =

Swiss-Congolese kickboxer

- Born: Grace Ollita Dimi
- Height: 1.66 m (5 ft 5 1/2 in)
- Weight: 59 kg (130 lb; 9.3 st)
- Style: Savate, Kickboxing
- Stance: Orthodox
- Fighting out of: Lausanne, Switzerland
- Team: Fight Factory Lausanne
- Trainer: Martial Ayissi

Kickboxing record
- Total: 10
- Wins: 8
- By knockout: 1
- Losses: 2
- By knockout: 0
- Draws: 0

Dorcas Ollita is a Swiss-Congolese kickboxer.

As of April 2026, she is ranked as the ninth best Women's Openweight in the world by Beyond Kickboxing.

== Professional Kickboxing career ==
On March 15, 2025, Ollita faced Zahra Moussinga at King of Switzerland. She won the fight by decision.

Ollita faced Eva Guillot for the vacant WAKO Pro K-1 European Lightweight (-59 kg) title at Phenix Boxing Only 12 on May 24, 2025. She won the fight via technical knockout due to a doctor stoppage.

Ollita faced Sofia Oliveira for the vacant WAKO Pro K-1 World Lightweight (-59 kg) title at FAV Underground 10 on March 7, 2026. She won the fight by decision.

== Championships and accomplishments ==
=== Professional ===
- World Association of Kickboxing Organizations
  - 2024 WAKO-Pro K-1 Swiss Lightweight (-59 kg) Champion
  - 2025 WAKO-Pro K-1 European Lightweight (-59 kg) Champion
  - 2026 WAKO-Pro K-1 World Lightweight (-59 kg) Champion
    - One successful defense

== Fight record ==
Professional Kickboxing record
8 Wins (1 (T)KO's), 2 Losses, 0 Draw, 0 No Contests
| Date | Result | Opponent | Event | Location | Method | Round | Time |
| 2026-11-07 | Win | (Switzerland) Stefanie Bütler | MJM XX | Martigny, Switzerland | Decision | 3 | 3:00 |
| 2026-10-04 | Win | (Portugal) Sofia Oliveira | Guimarães Fight Night 2 | Guimarães, Portugal | Decision | 5 | 3:00 |
Defends the WAKO Pro K-1 World Lightweight (-59 kg) title.
| 2026-06-18 | Loss | (Portugal) Débora Évora | FCE 5 | Lisbon, Portugal | Decision (Unanimous) | 3 | 3:00 |
| 2026-03-07 | Win | (Portugal) Sofia Oliveira | FAV Underground 10 | Lausanne, Switzerland | Decision | 5 | 3:00 |
Wins the vacant WAKO Pro K-1 World Lightweight (-59 kg) title.
| 2025-12-20 | Win | (France) Awa Balde | Le Choc Des Gladiateurs 3 | Nanterre, France | Decision | 3 | 3:00 |
| 2025-05-24 | Win | (France) Eva Guillot | Phenix Boxing Only 12 | Saint-Julien-en-Genevois, France | TKO (Doctor stoppage) | 5 | |
Wins the vacant WAKO Pro K-1 European Lightweight (-59 kg) title.
| 2025-03-15 | Win | (France) Zahra Moussinga | King of Switzerland | Lausanne, Switzerland | Decision | 3 | 3:00 |
| 2024-12-07 | Win | (Switzerland) Tess Schweizer | FAV Underground 9 | Lausanne, Switzerland | | | |
Wins the vacant WAKO Pro K-1 Switzerland Lightweight (-59 kg) title.
| 2024-04-20 | Win | (Switzerland) Morgane Zermatten | Martigny Fight Night | Martigny, Switzerland | | | |
| 2023-06-10 | Loss | (France) Mely Di Santo | Phenix Boxing Only 10 | Saint-Julien-en-Genevois, France | Decision | 3 | 3:00 |
Legend: Win Loss Draw/No contest Notes

== See also ==
- List of female kickboxers
