= Jackie Buntan =

American Muay Thai kickboxer

- Born: Jackielou Buntan; July 2, 1997 (age 29); Palos Verdes Estates, California, United States
- Nationality: American; Filipino
- Height: 5 ft 4 in (163 cm)
- Weight: 125 lb (57 kg; 8 st 13 lb)
- Division: Strawweight
- Reach: 68 in (173 cm)
- Style: Muay Thai
- Stance: Orthodox
- Fighting out of: Redondo Beach, California, United States
- Team: Team Boxing Works
- Years active: 2016 – present

Kickboxing record
- Total: 10
- Wins: 7
- By knockout: 1
- Losses: 3
- By knockout: 0

Amateur muay thai record
- Total: 25
- Wins: 20
- By knockout: 0
- Losses: 5

Jackielou Buntan (born July 2, 1997) is a Filipino-American Muay Thai kickboxer, currently competing in the strawweight division of ONE Championship, where she is a two-time ONE Women's Strawweight Muay Thai World Championship title challenger, and the inaugural ONE Women’s Strawweight Kickboxing World Champion. As of April 2023, she is ranked as the number one female super featherweight (130 lbs) Muay Thai practitioner in the world by the WBC Muaythai.

== Muay Thai career ==
=== ONE Championship ===
Buntan made her ONE Championship debut against Wondergirl Fairtex at ONE: Fists Of Fury on February 26, 2021. She won the fight by unanimous decision. Buntan scored the sole knockdown of the fight in the first round, dropping Wondergirl with a left hook. It was later revealed that Wondergirl had suffered two facial fractures and double vision as result of that knockdown.

Buntan faced Ekaterina Vandaryeva at ONE: Full Blast on April 28, 2021. She won the fight by majority decision.

Buntan faced Daniela López at ONE: Empower on September 3, 2021. She won the fight by unanimous decision.

Her three-fight winning streak under the ONE banner earned Buntan the chance to fight Smilla Sundell for the inaugural ONE Women's Strawweight Muay Thai World Championship at ONE 156 on April 22, 2022. Despite a strong start to the bout, she lost the fight by unanimous decision.

Buntan faced Amber Kitchen on December 3, 2022, at ONE on Prime Video 5. At the weigh-ins, Buntan weighed in at 130 pounds, 5 pounds over the strawweight limit and was fined 20% of her purse, which went to her opponent. She won the fight by unanimous decision.

Buntan faced Diandra Martin on May 5, 2023, at ONE Fight Night 10. At weigh-ins, Jackie Buntan (131 lbs) and Diandra Martin (126 lbs) both missed weight. Their bout proceeded at a catchweight of 131.0 lbs. She won the fight by a first-round knockout.

Buntan faced Martine Michieletto on March 9, 2024, at ONE Fight Night 20. She won the fight by unanimous decision.

Buntan was expected to face Anissa Meksen for the inaugural ONE Women's Strawweight Kickboxing World Championship on July 6, 2024, at ONE Fight Night 23. Buntan withdrew with an undisclosed injury on June 20. The bout was rescheduled on November 9, 2024, at ONE 169. She won the fight by unanimous decision.

Buntan again challenged for the now vacant ONE Women's Strawweight Muay Thai World Championship at ONE Fight Night 35, on September 5, 2025. Her opponent was Austrian kickboxer, Stella Hemetsberger. She lost the bout via unanimous decision, being dropped twice in the opening round.

== Titles and accomplishments ==
=== Kickboxing ===
- ONE Championship
  - 2024 ONE Women's Strawweight Kickboxing World Championship (one time, inaugural, former)

Awards

- Combat Press
  - 2024 Combat Press Fighter of the Year

== Fight record ==
Professional Muay Thai record
7 Wins (1 (T)KO's), 3 Losses, 0 Draw, 0 No Contest
Date	Result	Opponent	Event	Location	Method	Round	Time
2026-02-14	Loss	(Austria) Stella Hemetsberger	ONE Fight Night 40	Bangkok, Thailand	Decision (Split)	5	3:00
Loses the ONE Women's Strawweight Kickboxing World Championship.
2025-09-05	Loss	(Austria) Stella Hemetsberger	ONE Fight Night 35	Bangkok, Thailand	Decision (Unanimous)	5	3:00
For the vacant ONE Women's Strawweight Muay Thai World Championship.
2024-11-09	Win	(France) Anissa Meksen	ONE 169	Bangkok, Thailand	Decision (Unanimous)	5	3:00
Wins the inaugural ONE Women's Strawweight Kickboxing World Championship.
2024-03-09	Win	(Italy) Martine Michieletto	ONE Fight Night 20	Bangkok, Thailand	Decision (Unanimous)	3	3:00
2023-05-05	Win	(Australia) Diandra Martin	ONE Fight Night 10	Broomfield, Colorado, U.S.	KO (Right hook)	1	2:34
2022-12-02	Win	(United Kingdom) Amber Kitchen	ONE on Prime Video 5	Pasay, Philippines	Decision (Unanimous)	3	3:00
2022-04-22	Loss	(Sweden) Smilla Sundell	ONE 156	Kallang, Singapore	Decision (Unanimous)	5	3:00
For the inaugural ONE Women's Strawweight Muay Thai World Championship.
2021-09-03	Win	(Argentina) Daniela López	ONE Championship: Empower	Kallang, Singapore	Decision (Unanimous)	3	3:00
2021-04-28	Win	(Belarus) Ekaterina Vandaryeva	ONE Championship: Full Blast	Kallang, Singapore	Decision (Majority)	3	3:00
2021-02-26	Win	(Thailand) Wondergirl Fairtex	ONE Championship: Fists Of Fury	Kallang, Singapore	Decision (Unanimous)	3	3:00
Legend: Win Loss Draw/No contest Notes

Amateur Muay Thai Record
20 Wins, 5 Losses
Date	Result	Opponent	Event	Location	Method	Round	Time
2019-07-13	Win	(United States) Kendra McIntyre	Bad Intentions 3	Ontario, California, U.S.	Decision (Unanimous)	5	3:00
Won the WCK Muay Thai Full Rules Championship.
2019-03-09	Win	(United States) Gabrielle Laktineh	WCK Cali 33: Bring the Heat 3	Burbank, California, U.S.	Decision (Unanimous)	5	3:00
Won the IKF California Women's Featherweight Championship.
2018-09-15	Win	(Canada) Taylor McClatchie	SheFights II: Fight Like A Girl, Tournament Finals	Toronto, Canada	Decision (Unanimous)	3	2:00
Won the SheFights 125 lbs Tournament title.
2018-09-15	Win	(Canada) Vanessa De Belen	SheFights II: Fight Like A Girl, Tournament Semifinals	Toronto, Canada	Decision (Unanimous)	3	2:00
2018-04-30	Loss	(United States) Ashley Thiner	USMTO West 2018, Tournament Final	Burbank, California, U.S.	Decision (Split)	5	2:00
For the USMTO West A-Class Women's 125 lbs Tournament title.
2018-04-26	Win	(United States) Victoria Seeberger	USMTO West 2018, Tournament Semifinals	Phoenix, Arizona, U.S.	Decision (Unanimous)	3	2:00
2018-02-03	Win	(United States) Shannah Gozo	Cali 26 - Bring The Heat 2	Burbank, California, U.S.	Decision (Unanimous)	5	2:00
2018-01-17	Win	(United States)	TBA Classic	Phoenix, Arizona, U.S.	Decision (Unanimous)	3	2:00
2017-11-10	Loss	(United Kingdom) Amber Kitchen	Cali 25: The Mega Show 2	Burbank, California, U.S.	Decision (Split)	5	2:00
For the WCK C-Class International 122 lbs Championship.
2017-10-07	Loss	(United States) Julia Perez	WCK: Proving Grounds	Burbank, California, U.S.	Decision (Split)	5	2:00
For the IAMTF Women's Bantamweight Championship.
2017-09-16	Win	(Canada) Mandana Rafat	Destiny 5	Ontario, Canada	Decision	3	2:00
2017-04-29	Win	(United States) Breanne Lagunas	Cali 20: Beast Mode	Burbank, California, U.S.	Decision (Unanimous)	5	2:00
2017-02-18	Win	(United States) Akari Wang	Cali 19: Bring The Heat	Bell Gardens, California, U.S.	Decision (Unanimous)	3	2:00
2016-07-16	Win	(United States) Mikayla Barut	IFS 22	Anaheim, California, U.S.	Decision (Unanimous)	3	2:00
2016-03-11	Win	(United States) Taylor Mauldin	Defiant Promotions: Muay Thai Fighting	Studio City, Los Angeles, U.S.	Decision (Split)	3	2:00
Legend: Win Loss Draw/No contest Notes

== See also ==
- List of female kickboxers
