= Nina van Dalum =

Dutch kickboxer

- Born: November 29, 2000 (age 25); Wijk bij Duurstede, Netherlands
- Height: 168 cm (5 ft 6 in)
- Weight: 57 kg (126 lb; 9.0 st)
- Style: Kickboxing
- Stance: Orthodox
- Fighting out of: Duurstede, Netherlands
- Team: Central Gym Utrecht; Rene Sports
- Trainer: Samantha Van Doorn; Rene van Dalum; Arjan Bakkum

Kickboxing record
- Total: 27
- Wins: 20
- By knockout: 1
- Losses: 7

Nina van Dalum (born November 29, 2000) is a Dutch kickboxer. She is a current Enfusion two-division champion.

As of November 2023, she was the #7 ranked women bantamweight kickboxer in the world according to Beyond Kickboxing.

== Kickboxing career ==
=== Early career ===
Nina van Dalum started kickboxing at the age of 12 under her father Rene van Dalum who runs the Rene Sports gym.

On March 28, 2021, van Dalum faced Hélène Connart for the vacant ISKA K-1 European Super-featherweight title in Brussels, Belgium. She lost the fight by unanimous decision.

On July 4, 2021, van Dalum defeated Tisha Balentien by extension round unanimous decision at Enfusion Talents 83 in Alkmaar, The Netherlands.

Connart and van Dalum rematched for the vacant Enfusion -57 kg title at Enfusion 102 on September 5, 2021. She again lost the fight by decision.

On January 28, 2022, van Dalum travelled to Istanbul Turkey to face Göknur Yaşin Dündar at KOK. She lost the fight by split decision.

On September 17, 2022, van Dalum captured he first title when she defeated Hélène Connart by decision in their trilogy fight for the Enfusion World Flyweight title at Enfusion 110.

van Dalum was scheduled to face Astrid Johanna Grents on March 18, 2023, at The League IV in Tallinn, Estonia. She won the fight by decision.

on April 29, 2023, van Dalum faced Anaëlle Angerville at Fight Night One 15 in France. She lost the fight by decision.

van Dalum made the first defense of her Enfusion Flyweight title on June 17, 2023, at Enfusion 124 against Suad Salimova. She won the fight by decision to conserve her belt.

=== GLORY ===
van Dalum won her Glory debut against Débora Évora by unanimous decision at Glory 90 on December 23, 2023.

van Dalum faced Eva Guillot for the FNO Featherweight (-56 kg) title on April 27, 2024. She won the fight by unanimous decision.

== Championships and accomplishments ==
- Enfusion
  - 2022 Enfusion World Flyweight (-57 kg) Champion
    - Three successful title defenses
  - 2023 Enfusion World Bantamweight (-61 kg) Champion
- Fight Night One
  - 2024 Fight Night One Featherweight (-56 kg) Champion
    - Two successful title defenses

== Fight record ==
Professional Kickboxing record
20 Wins (1 (T)KO's), 7 Losses, 0 Draw, 0 No Contest
Date	Result	Opponent	Event	Location	Method	Round	Time
2026-04-06	Win	(France) Lou Solves	Fight Night One 23	Saint-Étienne, France	Decision (Majority)	5	3:00
Defends the Fight Night One Featherweight (-56 kg) title.
2025-06-14	Win	(Netherlands) Miranda Zondervan	8TKO #16	Groningen, Netherlands	Decision	5	3:00
Defends the Enfusion World Flyweight (-57 kg) Championship.
2025-04-26	Win	(Spain) Anta Sánchez	Fight Night One 21	Saint-Étienne, France	Decision (Unanimous)	5	3:00
Defends the Fight Night One Featherweight (-56 kg) title.
2025-02-22	Loss	(France) Sarah Moussadak	La Nuit des Titans	Tours, France	Decision	3	3:00
For the vacant La Nuit des Titans K-1 -56 kg title.
2024-11-16	Win	(Germany) Charly Glaser	Enfusion 143	Groningen, Netherlands	Decision (Unanimous)	3	3:00
2024-06-15	Win	(Germany) Angelique Mathea	Enfusion 139	Groningen, Netherlands	Decision (Unanimous)	5	3:00
Defends the Enfusion World Flyweight (-57 kg) Championship.
2024-04-27	Win	(France) Eva Guillot	Fight Night One 18	Saint-Etienne, France	Decision	5	3:00
Wins the vacant Fight Night One Featherweight (-56 kg) title.
2023-12-23	Win	(Portugal) Débora Évora	Glory 90	Rotterdam, Netherlands	Decision (Unanimous)	3	3:00
2023-11-18	Win	(Belgium) Kelly Danioko	Enfusion 129	Groningen, Netherlands	Decision (Unanimous)	5	3:00
Wins the vacant Enfusion World Bantamweight (-61 kg) Championship.
2023-06-17	Win	(Azerbaijan) Suad Salimova	Enfusion 124	Groningen, Netherlands	Decision	5	3:00
Defends the Enfusion World Flyweight (-57 kg) Championship.
2023-04-29	Loss	(France) Anaëlle Angerville	Fight Night One 14	Saint-Étienne, France	Decision	3	3:00
2023-03-18	Win	(Estonia) Astrid Johanna Grents	The League IV	Tallinn, Estonia	Decision	3	3:00
2023-01-28	Win	(Italy) Luciana Germano	KUMIT K Event	Catania, Italy	Decision	3	3:00
2022-09-17	Win	(Belgium) Hélène Connart	Enfusion 110	Alkmaar, Netherlands	Decision	5	3:00
Win the Enfusion World Flyweight (-57 kg) Championship.
2022-06-18	Win	(Netherlands) Miranda Zondervan	Enfusion Talents 92	Groningen, Netherlands	Decision	3	3:00
2022-04-09	Win	(Italy) Eleonora Parigi	The Chosen 3	Hamburg, Germany	Decision (Unanimous)	3	3:00
2022-01-28	Loss	(Turkey) Göknur Yaşin Dündar	KOK Istanbul	Istanbul, Turkey	Decision (Split)	3	3:00
2021-10-09	Win	(Germany) Kubra Abduk	The Chosen 2	Hamburg, Germany	Ext.R Decision	4	3:00
2021-09-05	Loss	(Belgium) Hélène Connart	Enfusion 102	Alkmaar, Netherlands	Decision	5	3:00
For the Enfusion World Flyweight (-57 kg) Championship.
2021-07-04	Win	(Suriname) Tisha Balentien	Enfusion Talents 83	Alkmaar, Netherlands	Ext.R Decision (Unanimous)	4	3:00
2021-03-28	Loss	(Belgium) Hélène Connart	Fight Covid 2	Brussels, Belgium	Decision (Unanimous)	5	3:00
For the ISKA K-1 European Super Featherweight (-59 kg) Championship.
2020-09-19	Loss	(Belgium) Kelly Danioko	Enfusion Talents 80	Alkmaar, Netherlands	Decision	3	3:00
2020-08-02	Win	(Netherlands) Montana Aerts	Summer Slam	The Hague, Netherlands	TKO (Corner stoppage)	3	
2019-12-14	Loss	(Netherlands) Djamilla Passial	Fighters Glory	Drachten, Netherlands	Decision	3	3:00
2019-11-02	Win	(Germany) Seyda Sallabas	Internationale Fight Night	Huckeswagen, Germany	Decision	3	3:00
2019-10-05	Win	(Netherlands) Sam Soede	Rings Gala	Amstelveen, Netherlands	Decision	3	3:00
2019-04-20	Win	(Netherlands) Djamilla Passial	FSL Fight Night	Emmen, Netherlands	Decision	3	3:00
Legend: Win Loss Draw/No contest Notes

== See also ==
- List of female kickboxers
