= Martine Michieletto =

Italian kickboxer (born 1992)

- Born: 21 September 1992 (age 34); Aosta, Italy
- Nickname: The Italian Queen
- Height: 1.70 m (5 ft 7 in)
- Weight: 57 kg (126 lb; 9 st 0 lb)
- Division: Featherweight
- Style: Muay Thai, Kickboxing
- Fighting out of: Aosta, Italy
- Team: Fighting Club Valle d'Aosta
- Trainer: Manuel Bethaz
- Years active: 2012 - present

Kickboxing record
- Total: 71
- Wins: 51
- By knockout: 5
- Losses: 15
- By knockout: 3
- Draws: 5

Martine Michieletto (born 21 September 1992) is an Italian muay thai boxer and kickboxer. She is the reigning ISKA featherweight K-1 champion and the former WKU featherweight muay thai champion.

As of October 2022, she is ranked as the sixth best pound-for-pound women's kickboxer in the world by Beyond Kick.

== Martial arts career ==
=== ISKA and WKU champion ===
During Steko's Fight Night, Michieletto fought in a ten-round bout against Julia Irmen for the WKU Full Contact World title. Irmen won the fight and title by a unanimous decision.

Michieletto faced Maribel de Sousa for the ISKA K-1 World Featherweight title at Muay Thai Time Vol. 2 on 13 June 2015. She won the fight by unanimous decision. Michieletto then faced Estela Garcia for the WKU Featherweight title at Thai Boxe Mania on 30 January 2016. She once again won the fight by unanimous decision.

Michieletto took part in the Iron Fight muay thai tournament, held at Iron Fight Vol3: Muay Thai Time on 13 March 2016. Although she was able to overcome Chiara Vincis by unanimous decision in the semifinals of the one-day tournament, she lost to Veronica Vernocchi by a third-round technical knockout in the finals. She rebounded from this loss with a unanimous decision over Sud Siam Sor. Sumalee at Muay Real Thai Fight on 8 August 2016. After suffering a split decision loss to Saifah Sor Suparat on 29 August, Michieletto won her next two fights against Nana Tsang on 8 October 2016 and Angelina Panza on 28 January 2017.

Her two-fight win streak earned Michieletto the chance to challenge Denise Kielholtz for the Bellator Flyweight Kickboxing title at Bellator Kickboxing 5 on 8 April 2017. Kielholtz retained her title by unanimous decision.

Michieletto faced Alessia Greco at Evolution Fight on 29 July 2017. She won the fight by unanimous decision. After she beat Sud Siam Sor. Sumalee by unanimous decision on 8 August 2017, Michieletto was booked to face Federica Sbaraglia at Petrosyan Mania on 14 October 2017. She won the fight by a second-round technical knockout.

Michieletto made her first WKU featherweight title defense against Elna Nilsson at Battle of Lund IX on 18 November 2017. She managed to win the fight by a split decision.

Michieletto faced Irene Martens at Aspettando Petrosyan Mania on 17 February 2018, in her first fight of the year. She won the fight by unanimous decision. Michieletto then took part in the 2018 Fight Challenge featherweight tournament, held on 10 March 2018. She captured the tournament title after winning both her semifinal bout against Lorena Signetto and her final bout against Erika Vesan by unanimous decision.

Martine Michieletto participated in the 2018 IFMA World Championships. She scored knockout wins over Lucia Krajčovič in the quarter-finals and Patricia Axling in the semifinals, both in the third round. In the finals of the 57 kg tournament she faced Anaëlle Angerville and won by a unanimous decision.

Michieletto faced Gloria Peritore at Bellator Kickboxing 10 on 14 July 2018. She won the fight by unanimous decision. Michieletto next faced Delphine Guénon at Petrosyanmania: Gold Edition on 16 February 2019. She won the fight by unanimous decision.

Michieletto made her first ISKA K-1 featherweight title defense against Veronica Vernocchi on the 25 May 2019, Oktagon event. She won the fight by unanimous decision. After retaining her championship, Michieletto faced Shanelle Dyer for the WMF Featherweight title at Evolution Fight on 21 December 2019. She won the fight by unanimous decision.

Michieletto made her second ISKA K-1 title defense against Patricia Axling at Road to Lion Fight: Sofokleus vs. Carrara on 29 August 2020. She won the fight by unanimous decision. Michieletto made her third ISKA K-1 title defense against Ella Maria Grapperhaus at Antares Fight Night 2 on 9 July 2022. She won the fight by unanimous decision.

=== ONE Championship ===
During ONE on TNT 4, Chatri Sityodtong announced that Michieletto would face former GLORY Super Bantamweight Champion Anissa Meksen in a strawweight kickboxing bout on 28 May 2021 at ONE Championship: Empower. The event featured the first ever all-female fight card in ONE Championship. Michieletto was later replaced by Cristina Morales.

Michieletto made her third ISKA K-1 World Featherweight title defense against Ella Maria Grapperhaus at Antares Fight Night on 9 July 2022. She won the fight by unanimous decision.

Michieletto faced Amber Kitchen at ONE Fight Night 11 on 10 June 2023. She won the fight by unanimous decision.

Michieletto was expected to make her fourth ISKA K-1 World Featherweight title defense against Anta Sanchez at OKTAGON on 18 November 2023. She withdrew from the bout on 2 November, after suffering an injury in training.

Michieletto faced Jackie Buntan on 9 March 2024, at ONE Fight Night 20. She lost the fight by unanimous decision.

Michieletto faced Eva Guillot at Oktagon Tsunami Edition on 29 June 2024. She won the fight by unanimous decision.

Michieletto faced Charly Glaser at The Arena - Warrior's Legacy on 22 March 2025. She won the fight by unanimous decision.

Michieletto was expected to make her fourth ISKA K-1 World Featherweight title defense against Sarah Moussadak at Oktagon: Valle D'Aosta on 7 June 2025. Moussadak later withdrew for undisclosed reasons and was replaced by the WAKO-Pro K-1 World Featherweight champion Débora Évora. Michieletto lost the fight by a third-round knockout.

== Championships and accomplishments ==
=== Amateur ===
- World Traditional Kickboxing Association
  - (gold) 2011 WTKA Amateur World Championship
- International Federation of Muaythai Associations
  - (gold) 2016 Tafisa World Games Muay Thai -57 kg Championship
  - (gold) 2018 IFMA World -57 kg Championship

=== Professional ===
- International Sport Karate Association
  - ISKA World K-1 Featherweight Championship (One time, current)
    - Three successful title defenses
- World Kickboxing and Karate Union
  - WKU World Featherweight Muay Thai Championship (One time, former)
    - One successful title defense
- World MuayThai Federation
  - WMF World Featherweight Muay Thai Championship (One time, current)

== Fight record ==
Professional Kickboxing and Muay Thai Record
51 Wins (5 (T)KO's), 15 Losses, 5 Draw, 0 No Contest
Date	Result	Opponent	Event	Location	Method	Round	Time
2025-06-07	Loss	(Portugal) Débora Évora	Oktagon: Valle D'Aosta	Courmayeur, Italy	KO (Straight to the body)	3	
Loses the ISKA K-1 World Featherweight (-57kg) title.
2025-03-22	Win	(Germany) Charly Glaser	The Arena - Warrior's Legacy	Campione d'Italia, Italy	Decision (Unanimous)	3	3:00
2024-06-29	Win	(France) Eva Guillot	Oktagon Tsunami Edition	Rome, Italy	Decision (Unanimous)	3	3:00
2024-03-09	Loss	(United States) Jackie Buntan	ONE Fight Night 20	Bangkok, Thailand	Decision (Unanimous)	3	3:00
2023-06-10	Win	(United Kingdom) Amber Kitchen	ONE Fight Night 11	Bangkok, Thailand	Decision (Unanimous)	3	3:00
2022-07-09	Win	(Netherlands) Ella Maria Grapperhaus	Antares Fight Night 2	Edolo, Italy	Decision (Unanimous)	5	3:00
Defends the ISKA K-1 World Featherweight (-57kg) title.
2020-08-29	Win	(Sweden) Patricia Axling	Road to Lion Fight: Sofokleus vs. Carrara	Rosolini, Italy	Decision (Unanimous)	5	3:00
Defends the ISKA K-1 World Featherweight (-57kg) title.
2020-01-02	Win	(Spain) Laura De Blas	PetrosyanMania: Gold Edition	Milan, Italy	Decision (Unanimous)	3	3:00
2019-12-21	Win	(England) Shanelle Dyer	Evolution Fight	Rosolini, Italy	Decision (Unanimous)	5	3:00
For the WMF Featherweight title.
2019-05-25	Win	(Italy) Veronica Vernocchi	Oktagon	Monza, Italy	Decision (Unanimous)	5	3:00
Defends the ISKA K-1 World Featherweight (-57kg) title.
2019-02-16	Win	(France) Delphine Guénon	Petrosyanmania: Gold Edition	Monza, Italy	Decision (Unanimous)	3	3:00
2018-07-14	Win	(Italy) Gloria Peritore	Bellator Kickboxing 10	Rome, Italy	Decision (Unanimous)	3	3:00
2018-03-10	Win	(Italy) Erika Vesan	Fight Challenge, Tournament Final	Casale Monferrato, Italy	Decision (Unanimous)	3	3:00
2018-03-10	Win	(Italy) Lorena Signetto	Fight Challenge, Tournament Semifinal	Casale Monferrato, Italy	Decision (Unanimous)	3	3:00
2018-02-17	Win	(Italy) Irene Martens	Aspettando Petrosyan Mania	Milan, Italy	Decision (Unanimous)	3	3:00
2017-11-18	Win	(Sweden) Elna Nilsson	Battle of Lund IX	Lund, Sweden	Decision (Split)	5	3:00
Defends the WKU Featherweight title.
2017-10-14	Win	(Italy) Federica Sbaraglia	Petrosyan Mania	Monza, Italy	TKO (Punches)	2	
2017-08-08	Win	(Thailand) Sud Siam Sor. Sumalee	Chiag Mai Boxing Stadium	Chiang Mai, Thailand	Decision (Unanimous)	5	2:00
2017-07-29	Win	(Italy) Alessia Greco	Evolution Fight	Rosolini, Italy	Decision (Unanimous)	5	3:00
2017-04-08	Loss	(Netherlands) Denise Kielholtz	Bellator Kickboxing 5	Turin, Italy	Decision (Unanimous)	5	3:00
For the Bellator Kickboxing Flyweight title.
2017-01-28	Win	(France) Angelina Panza	Thai Boxe Mania	Turin, Italy	Decision (Unanimous)	3	3:00
2016-10-08	Win	(Hong Kong) Nana Tsang	Tafisa World Games	Jakarta, Indonesia	Decision (Unanimous)	3	3:00
2016-08-29	Loss	(Thailand) Saifah Sor Suparat	The Best of The Year: Thaphae Boxing Stadium	Chiang Mai, Thailand	Decision (Split)	5	2:00
2016-08-08	Win	(Thailand) Sud Siam Sor. Sumalee	Muay Real Thai Fight	Chiang Mai, Thailand	Decision (Unanimous)	3	3:00
2016-03-13	Loss	(Italy) Veronica Vernocchi	Iron Fight Vol3: Muay Thai Time, Tournament Final	Cogoleto, Italy	TKO (Doctor Stoppage)	3	
2016-03-13	Win	(Italy) Chiara Vincis	Iron Fight Vol3: Muay Thai Time, Tournament Semifinal	Cogoleto, Italy	Decision (Unanimous)	3	3:00
2016-01-30	Win	(Spain) Estela Garcia	Thai Boxe Mania	Turin, Italy	Decision (Unanimous)	5	3:00
Wins the WKU Featherweight title.
2015-06-13	Win	(Spain) Maribel de Sousa	Muay Thai Time Vol. 2	Cogoleto, Italy	Decision (Unanimous)	5	3:00
Wins the ISKA K-1 World Featherweight (-57kg) title.
2015-05-07	Loss	(Germany) Julia Irmen	Steko's Fight Night	Germany	Decision (Unanimous)	10	2:00
For the WKU Full Contact World title.
2015-03-01	Win	(Italy) Chiara Vincis	Total Kombat	Milan, Italy	TKO (Retirement)	1	
2014-12-14	Draw	(Italy) Michela Galli	Trofeo Fight 1	Forte dei Marmi, Italy	Decision (Split)	3	3:00
2014-11-29	Win	(Netherlands) Vanessa De Waele	Jesolo Fight Night	Jesolo, Italy	Decision (Unanimous)	3	3:00
2014-11-09	Win	(Italy) Toulassi Leila	WFC World Championship	Milan, Italy	Decision (Unanimous)	3	3:00
2014-11-08	Win	(Spain) Maria Garcia Espejo	WFC World Championship	Milan, Italy	Decision (Unanimous)	3	3:00
2014-10-19	Draw	(Italy) Sandy Manfrotto	Born To fight	Milan, Italy	Decision (Split)	3	3:00
2014-06-22	Win	(Italy) Alice Galli		Milan, Italy	Decision (Unanimous)	3	3:00
2014-05-18	Win	(Italy) Alice Galli	Fight in Disco	Pinerolo, Italy	Decision (Unanimous)	3	3:00
2014-04-27	Win	(France) Emilie Schaeffer	Full Contact	Milan, Italy	Decision (Unanimous)	3	2:00
2014-04-05	Win	(Italy) Maria Ciraolo	Coppa Italia Fight 1	Milan, Italy	Decision (Unanimous)	3	2:00
2013-12-08	Win	(Italy) Michela Galli	Pisa Abbraccia lo Sport	Pisa, Italy	Disqualification	1	3:00
2013-10-20	Win	(Italy) Michela Socci	Pitbull Arena	Pisa, Italy	TKO	2	2:30
2013-09-28	Win	(France) Miriam Sabot	Gorizia Fight Night	Gorizia, Italy	Decision (Unanimous)	3	3:00
2013-07-20	Win	(France) Perla Bragagnolo	WFC	Vinovo, Italy	Decision (Unanimous)	3	3:00
Won the WFC European title.
2013-06-30	Win	(Netherlands) Martina Mercinelli	WFC The Right Way	Chieri, Italy	Decision (Unanimous)	3	3:00
2013-06-01	Win	(Netherlands) Roxana Gaal	Thai Boxe sotto le Stelle	Chieri, Italy	Decision (Unanimous)	3	3:00
2013-05-18	Loss	(France) Jacqueline Berroud	Internationaux de Thionville	Thionville, France	Decision (Split)	4	2:00
2013-03-24	Win	(Italy) Camilla Tarozzi		Vanzaghello, Italy	TKO	1	1:14
2013-02-23	Loss	(Italy) Miriam Sabot	Fight Warriors	Milan, Italy	Decision (Unanimous)	3	3:00
2012-12-15	Loss	(Italy) Martina Moro	Campione on the Ring	Switzerland	Decision (Split)	3	3:00
2012-11-24	Win	(Italy) Francesca Lungi	Low Kick	Rovellasca, Italy	Decision (Unanimous)	3	3:00
2012-	Loss	(Italy) Martina Moro	Best of The Best	Rovellasca, Italy	Decision	5	3:00
For the Italian National Muay thai featherweight title.
2012-06-23	Draw	(Italy) Martina Mercinelli	Impetus	Pinerolo, Italy	Decision (Split)	3	3:00
2012-06-09	Loss	(Italy) Paola Cappucci	Fight Night Valdarno	Valdarno, Italy	TKO	2	2:10
Legend: Win Loss Draw/No contest Notes

Amateur Kickboxing Record
Date	Result	Opponent	Event	Location	Method	Round	Time
2018-05-18	Win	(France) Anaëlle Angerville	IFMA World Championship -57 kg Tournament, Final	Cancún, Mexico	Decision (Unanimous)	3	3:00
Wins the IFMA World 57 kg title.
2018-08-16	Win	(Sweden) Patricia Axling	IFMA World Championship -57 kg Tournament, Semi-final	Cancún, Mexico	KO (Punches)	3	
2018-08-14	Win	(Slovakia) Lucia Krajčovič	IFMA World Championship -57 kg Tournament, Quarter-final	Cancún, Mexico	KO (Punches)	3	
2016-06-05	Win	(Italy) Michela Socci	Campionati Italiani Muay Thai Fight1	Rimini, Italy	Decision (Unanimous)	3	3:00
2015-11-	Win	(France) Samira Bounhar	K1 Amateur World Championships, Final	Tuscany, Italy	Decision (Unanimous)	3	3:00
Wins the K-1 Amateur World 57 kg title.
Legend: Win Loss Draw/No contest Notes

== See also ==
- List of female kickboxers
