= Daria Kuvakina =

Russian kickboxer

Darya Kuvakina
- Born: Дарья Кувакина; 7 August 2000 (age 26); Solikamsk, Russia
- Height: 1.68 m (5 ft 6 in)
- Weight: 57 kg (126 lb; 9 st 0 lb)
- Style: Kūdō, Kickboxing
- Stance: Orthodox
- Fighting out of: Yaroslavl, Russia
- Team: Sports School "Bear" (2014–2024); Team Kali Ural (2024–present)
- Years active: 2023 - present

Kickboxing record
- Total: 7
- Wins: 7
- By knockout: 0
- Losses: 0

Other information
- University: Yaroslavl State Pedagogical University

Darya Kuvakina (born August 7, 2000) is a Russian kickboxer. As of April 2025, she was the #6 ranked women's bantamweight kickboxer in the world according to Beyond Kickboxing.

== Kickboxing career ==
Kuvakina made her professional debut against Diana Voloshina at the September 15, 2023, Cup of Lotus event, in a -56 kilogram bout held during the preliminary portion of the card. She won the fight by unanimous decision.

Kuvakina faced Elena Ohapkina at FKR PRO 8 on February 22, 2024 at the RED ARENA in Krasnaya Polyana in Sochi, Russia. She won the fight by unanimous decision.

Kuvakina faced the WAKO-Pro European and World champion Débora Évora at Ural FC 8: Asbarov v Boardman on October 16, 2024.

Kuvakina faced Sudenur Bostanci at FKR PRO 10 on February 15, 2023. She knocked her opponent down once in the final round and won the fight by unanimous decision, with all three judges awarding her every round of the bout.

Kuvkina faced Marilyn Contin for the vacant WKF K-1 world title at Ural FC 10. She won the fight by unanimous decision after scoring a fifth round knockdown with scores of 50—46, 50—44 and 50—43.

Kuvakina faced Fatma Gökçe at Ural FC: Governor's Cup on August 28, 2026, with the symbolic Perm Krai Governor's Cup being awarded to the winner. She won the fight by unanimous decision.

== Championships and accomplishments ==
=== Amateur ===
- Russian Kickboxing Federation
  - 4x Russian Kickboxing Cup Full Contact (-56 kg) (gold) (2019, 2020, 2022, 2023)
- World Association of Kickboxing Organizations
  - 2017 WAKO Juniors European Championships Full Contact (-56 kg) (gold)
  - 2018 WAKO Juniors World Championships Full Contact (-56 kg) (gold)
  - 2019 WAKO 24th Bestfighter World Cup Full Contact (-56 kg) (gold)
  - 2021 WAKO World Championship Full Contact (-56 kg) (silver)

=== Professional ===
- World Kickboxing Federation
  - 2025 WKF K-1 World Champion

== Fight record ==
Professional Kickboxing Record
8 Wins (0 (T)KOs), 0 Losses, 0 Draws
| Date | Result | Opponent | Event | Location | Method | Round | Time |
| 2026-08-28 | Win | (Turkey) Fatma Gökçe | Ural FC: Governor's Cup | Perm, Russia | Decision (unanimous) | 3 | 3:00 |
| 2026-05-08 | Win | (Moldova) Stefania Tutaru | Osminog x Ural FC | Minsk, Belarus | Decision (unanimous) | 3 | 3:00 |
| 2025-08-16 | Win | (Uruguay) Marilyn Contin | Ural FC 10 | Perm, Russia | Decision (unanimous) | 5 | 3:00 |
Wins the vacant WKF K-1 World title.
| 2025-02-15 | Win | (Turkey) Sudenur Bostanci | FKR PRO 10 | Moscow, Russia | Decision (unanimous) | 3 | 3:00 |
| 2024-10-16 | Win | (Portugal) Débora Évora | Ural FC 8 | Perm, Russia | Ext. R. Decision (unanimous) | 4 | 3:00 |
| 2024-10-16 | Win | (Russia) Roza Knysh | FKR PRO 9 | Ulyanovsk, Russia | Decision (unanimous) | 3 | 3:00 |
| 2024-02-22 | Win | (Russia) Elena Ohapkina | FKR PRO 8 | Sochi, Russia | Decision (unanimous) | 3 | 3:00 |
| 2023-09-15 | Win | (Russia) Diana Voloshina | Cup of Lotus | Elista, Russia | Decision (unanimous) | 3 | 3:00 |
Legend: Win Loss Draw/No contest Notes

Amateur Kickboxing Record
| Date | Result | Opponent | Event | Location | Method | Round | Time |
|---|---|---|---|---|---|---|---|
| 2021-10- | Loss | (United Kingdom) Tennessee Randall | 2021 WAKO World Championship, Final | Jesolo, Italy | Decision (Unanimous) | 3 | 2:00 |
Wins the 2021 WAKO World Championship Full Contact (-56 kg) Silver Medal.
| 2021-10- | Win | (Germany) Fiona Wohlers | 2021 WAKO World Championship, Semifinals | Jesolo, Italy | Decision (unanimous) | 3 | 2:00 |
| 2021-10- | Win | (Norway) Kristin Vollstad | 2021 WAKO World Championship, Quarterfinals | Jesolo, Italy | Decision (unanimous) | 3 | 2:00 |
| 2021-10- | Win | (Kazakhstan) Aigerim Rakhatova | 2021 WAKO World Championship, First Round | Jesolo, Italy | Decision (unanimous) | 3 | 2:00 |
| 2019-06-16 | Win | (Russia) Irina Parakhina | 24th Bestfighter World Cup, Finals | Rimini, Italy | Decision (split) | 3 | 2:00 |
Wins the 24th Bestfighter World Cup Full Contact (-56 kg) Gold Medal.
| 2019-06-14 | Win | (Norway) Kristin Vollstad | 24th Bestfighter World Cup, Semifinals | Rimini, Italy | Decision (split) | 3 | 2:00 |
| 2019-06-13 | Win | (Norway) Sandra Landsvik Børnes | 24th Bestfighter World Cup, Quarterfinals | Rimini, Italy | Decision (unanimous) | 3 | 2:00 |
| 2018-09- | Win | (Turkey) Esra Ozyol | 2018 WAKO Juniors World Championships, Finals | Lido di Jesolo, Italy | Decision (unanimous) | 3 | 2:00 |
Wins the 2018 WAKO Juniors World Championships Full Contact (-56 kg) Gold Medal.
| 2018-09- | Win | (Poland) Nicola Kaczmarek | 2018 WAKO Juniors World Championships, Semifinals | Lido di Jesolo, Italy | Decision (unanimous) | 3 | 2:00 |
| 2017-09- | Win | (Russia) Valeriya Genze | 2017 WAKO Juniors European Championships Full Contact, Finals | Skopje, North Macedonia | Decision (unanimous) | 3 | 2:00 |
Wins the 2017 WAKO Juniors European Championships Full Contact (-56 kg) Gold Medal.
| 2017-09- | Win | (Poland) Gabriela Laskowska | 2017 WAKO Juniors European Championships Full Contact, Semifinals | Skopje, North Macedonia | Decision (unanimous) | 3 | 2:00 |
Legend: Win Loss Draw/No contest Notes

== See also ==
- List of female kickboxers
