= Antonia Prifti =

Greek kickboxer (born 2001)

- Born: Αντωνία Πρίφτη; August 10, 2001 (age 25); Athens, Greece
- Other names: Andonia; The Panther
- Height: 166 cm (5 ft 5 in)
- Weight: 55 kg (121 lb; 8.7 st)
- Style: Kickboxing
- Stance: Orthodox
- Fighting out of: Athens, Greece
- Team: Fight Club Galatsi/Theofanous Elite Team

Kickboxing record
- Total: 30
- Wins: 26
- By knockout: 6
- Losses: 3
- Draws: 1

Mixed martial arts record
- Total: 3
- Wins: 2
- By knockout: 2
- Losses: 1
- By decision: 1

Antonia Prifti (born August 10, 2001) is a Greek kickboxer. She is the former K-1 Flyweight champion.

As of March 2026 she was the #3 ranked -57.5 kg kickboxer in the world by Beyond Kickboxing.

== Kickboxing career ==
Prifti started kickboxing training at the age of 12 at Fight Club Galatsi with her trainer Ioannis Thefoanous. She won her first 41 amateur fights and turned professional in 2019.

On July 13, 2019, Prifti defeated Katia Telitsenko by decision at Solybar Summer Fights.

On November 19, 2021, Prifti travelled to Italy to face Alessia Coluccia for the vacant ISKA Muay Thai -57 kg title. She lost the fight by unanimous decision.

On May 1, 2022, Prifti faced Hélène Connart at Thaiboxing Discovery Event under K-1 rules in Wavre, Belgium. She won the fight by unanimous decision.

Prifti faced Alessia Coluccia for the vacant ISKA Muay Thai European 57 kg title at La Notte dei Gladiatori on November 19, 2023. She lost the fight by unanimous decision.

On November 5, 2022, Prifti faced Chellina Chirino at Enfusion 114 in Amsterdam Netherlands. The fight was declared a draw after three rounds.

Prifti took part in a -60 kg tournament at WKS Athens 2023 on April 29, 2023. She captured the tournament title with unanimous decision victories over Antigoni Kontaxi in the semifinals and Maria Tsiplostefanaki in the tournament final.

On June 4, 2023, Prifti faced Schahrsad Shahmirzadi for the vacant WKU K-1 World -57 kg title at Ley Sha Fight Night. She won the fight by technical knockout in the second round.

Prifti was scheduled to challenge KANA for her K-1 Women's Flyweight (-52kg) Championship at K-1 ReBIRTH 2 on December 9, 2023. She won the fight by unanimous decision, with all three judges scoring the contest 30–29 in her favor.

Prifti made her first K-1 Women's Flyweight (-52kg) Championship defense against SAHO at K-1 World MAX 2024 - World Tournament Opening Round on March 20, 2024. She lost the fight by a unanimous decision.

Prifti faced Eva Guillot for the vacant ISKA Oriental rules World Featherweight (-57 kg) title at La Nuit des Gladiateurs VII on April 19, 2025. She won the fight by a fourth-round technical knockout.

== Mixed martial arts career ==
Prifti made her professional mixed martial arts debut on January 29, 2022, at Vendetta Fight Nights in Istanbul, Turkey, against Sabriye Şengül for the vacant flyweight title. She won the fight by technical knockout in the second round after landing a head kick and following with punches on the ground to force the stoppage.

For her third professional fight, Prifti was scheduled to face Hélène Connart at Bushido 87 in Kraainem, Belgium. She had previously defeated Connart under kickboxing rules a year earlier. Prifti won the fight by technical knockout in the first round after a prolonged series of punches forced the stoppage.

== Championships and accomplishments ==
=== Professional ===
- International Sport Kickboxing Association
  - 2025 ISKA Oriental rules World Featherweight (-57 kg) Champion
- K-1
  - 2023 K-1 Women's Flyweight (-52kg) Champion
- World Karate and Kickboxing Union
  - 2023 WKU K-1 World -57.5 kg Champion
- Beyond Kickboxing
  - 2023 Beyond Kickboxing "Female Fighter of the Year"
- International Fight Promotion
  - 2025 IFP World Strawweight (-52 kg) Champion

=== Amateur ===
- Greek Muaythai Federation
  - (gold) 2021 Panhellenic Muaythai Championships A-class -60 kg
  - (gold) 2021 Panhellenic Muaythai Cup A-class -60 kg
  - (silver) 2022 Panhellenic Muaythai Championships A-class -57 kg
  - (gold) 2022 Panhellenic Muaythai Championship Elite -60 kg
- K-1
  - (silver) 2019 K-1 Open World Championship in Milan -56 kg
- World Karate and Kickboxing Union
  - (gold) 2017 WKU World Championship K-1 -60 kg
  - 2019 WKU K-1 Greece -62 kg Champion

== Mixed martial arts record ==
Professional record breakdown
3 matches	2 wins	1 loss
By knockout	2	0
By decision	0	1

Res.	Record	Opponent	Method	Event	Date	Round	Time	Location	Notes
Win	2–1	Hélène Connart	KO (punch)	Bushido 87	March 11, 2023	1	2:10	Kraainem, Belgium	
Loss	1–1	Eleni Moisidou	Decision (unanimous)	MCP 11: Polianidis vs. Kazantzidis	June 4, 2022	3	5:00	Thessaloniki, Greece	Bantamweight bout.
Win	1–0	Sabriye Sengül	KO (head kick and punches)	Vendetta 24	January 29, 2022	2	0:18	Istanbul, Turkey	Flyweight debut.

== Kickboxing and Muay Thai record ==
Professional Kickboxing and Muay Thai record
Date	Result	Opponent	Event	Location	Method	Round	Time
2026-09-11	Win	(Belgium) Ameline Gerson	ONE Friday Fights 170, Lumpinee Stadium	Bangkok, Thailand	Decision (unanimous)	3	3:00
2026-01-24	Win	(Turkey) Melis Nazlican Talun	Vendetta Fight Nights 49	Ankara, Turkey	Decision (unanimous)	3	3:00
2025-09-27	Win	(Netherlands) Tessa De Kom	IFP	Genk, Belgium	Decision (split)	5	3:00
Wins the IFP World Strawweight (-52kg) title.
2025-04-19	Win	(France) Eva Guillot	La Nuit des Gladiateurs VII	Vernoux-en-Vivarais, France	TKO (referee stoppage)	4	
Wins the vacant ISKA Oriental rules World Featherweight (-57 kg) title.
2024-03-20	Loss	(Japan) SAHO	K-1 World MAX 2024 - World Tournament Opening Round	Tokyo, Japan	Decision (unanimous)	3	3:00
Loses the K-1 Women's Flyweight (-52kg) Championship.
2023-12-09	Win	(Japan) KANA	K-1 ReBIRTH 2	Osaka, Japan	Decision (unanimous)	3	3:00
Wins the K-1 Women's Flyweight (-52kg) Championship.
2023-06-04	Win	(Germany) Schahrsad Shahmirzadi	Ley Sha Fight Night	Athens, Greece	TKO (punches)	2	1:50
Wins the vacant WKU K-1 World 57.5kg title
2023-04-29	Win	(Greece) Maria Tsiplostefanaki	World Kickboxing Series, Tournament Final	Athens, Greece	Decision (unanimous)	3	3:00
2023-04-29	Win	(Greece) Antigoni Kontaxi	World Kickboxing Series, Tournament Semifinals	Athens, Greece	Decision (unanimous)	3	2:00
2022-11-19	Loss	(Italy) Alessia Coluccia	La Notte dei Gladiatori	Italy	Decision (unanimous)	5	3:00
For the vacant ISKA Muay Thai European 57kg title
2022-11-05	Draw	(Netherlands) Chellina Chirino	Enfusion 114	Amsterdam, Netherlands	Decision	3	3:00
2022-05-01	Win	(Belgium) Hélène Connart	Thaiboxing Discovery Event	Wavre, Belgium	Decision (unanimous)	3	3:00
2020-07-25	Win	(Greece) Eleni Katsimicha	Artemis Fight Night	Athens, Greece	Decision (unanimous)	3	3:00
2019-12-20	Win	(Greece) Maria Panagiotakopoulou	Gods Of War XIII - Glory of Heroes	Athens, Greece	Decision (unanimous)	3	3:00
2019-07-13	Win	(Greece) Katia Telitsenko	Solybar Summer Fights	Greece	Decision	3	3:00
2019-03-16	Win	(Italy) Piera Nasso	Open Championship	Athens, Greece	Decision	3	3:00
Legend: Win Loss Draw/No contest Notes

Amateur Kickboxing and Muay Thai record
Date	Result	Opponent	Event	Location	Method	Round	Time
2022-12-18	Win	(Greece) Varvara Valeria Mesoropian	2022 Panhellenic Muaythai Cup, Tournament Final	Athens, Greece	Decision	3	3:00
Wins the 2022 Panhellenic Muaythai Cup -60kg Gold Medal.
2022-12-18	Win	(Greece) Mia Macesic	2022 Panhellenic Muaythai Cup, Tournament Semifinal	Athens, Greece	Decision	3	3:00
2022-07-02	Loss	(Greece) Elidona Leka	2022 Panhellenic Muaythai Championship, Tournament Semifinal	Glyfada, Greece	Decision	3	3:00
Wins the 2022 Panhellenic A-Class Muaythai Championship -57kg Bronze Medal.
2021-11-14	Win	(Greece) Mia Macesic	2021 Panhellenic Muaythai Cup, Tournament Final	Loutraki, Greece	Decision	3	3:00
Wins the 2021 Panhellenic A-Class Muaythai Cup -60kg Gold Medal.
2021-11-13	Win	(Greece) Georgia Karaxaliou	2021 Panhellenic Muaythai Cup, Tournament Semifinal	Loutraki, Greece	Decision	3	3:00
2021-06-27	Win	(Greece) Antonika Moskvina	2021 Panhellenic Muaythai Championship, Tournament Final	Loutraki, Greece	Decision	3	3:00
Wins the 2021 Panhellenic A-Class Muaythai Championship -60kg Gold Medal.
2021-06-27	Win	(Greece) Dimitra Kariofili	2021 Panhellenic Muaythai Championship, Tournament Semifinal	Loutraki, Greece	Decision	3	3:00
2019-12-01	Loss	(Italy) Sveva Millo	K-1 Open World Championship	Milan, Italy	Decision	3	3:00
Wins the 2019 K-1 Open World Championship -56kg Silver Medal.
2020-02-	Win	(Greece) Emilia Kapris	2020 Gods of War Open	Greece	Decision (unanimous)	3	2:00
2017-07-21	Win	(Greece) Alexandra Dede	Monemvasia Fight Night	Monemvasia, Greece	Decision (unanimous)	3	3:00
2017-04-02	Win	(Greece) Eleni Sotiropoulou	International Fight Club Open 2017	Galatsi, Greece	Decision (unanimous)	3	3:00
Legend: Win Loss Draw/No contest Notes

== See also ==
- List of female kickboxers
