= ONE Fight Night 35 =

Combat sport events in 2025

ONE Fight Night 35: Buntan vs. Hemetsberger
- The poster for ONE Fight Night 35: Buntan vs. Hemetsberger
- Promotion: ONE Championship
- Date: September 6, 2025
- Venue: Lumpinee Boxing Stadium
- City: Bangkok, Thailand

Event chronology
| ONE Fight Night 34: Eersel vs. Jarvis | ONE Fight Night 35: Buntan vs. Hemetsberger | ONE Fight Night 36 |

ONE Fight Night 35: Buntan vs. Hemetsberger was a combat sports event produced by ONE Championship that took place on September 6, 2025, at Lumpinee Boxing Stadium in Bangkok, Thailand.

== Background ==
A ONE Women's Strawweight Muay Thai World Championship bout for the vacant title between the current ONE Women's Strawweight Kickboxing World Champion Jackie Buntan and Stella Hemetsberger headlined the event.

At the weigh-ins, one fighter failed to hydration test and missed weight for their respective fights:

- Akbar Abdullaev weighed in at 158.75 pounds, 3.75 pounds over the featherweight limit and he was fined 30 percent of his purse which went to Ibragim Dauev.

== Results ==
Fight card (Amazon Prime Video)
| Weight class | | | | Method | Round | Time | Notes |
|---|---|---|---|---|---|---|---|
| Women's Strawweight Muay Thai | Stella Hemetsberger | def. | Jackie Buntan | Decision (unanimous) | 5 | 3:00 | (Note: For the vacant ONE Women's Strawweight Muay Thai World Championship.) |
| Featherweight Muay Thai | Shadow Singha Mawynn | def. | Bampara Kouyate | KO (spinning backfist) | 2 | 1:20 | (Note: ONE Featherweight Muay Thai title eliminator.) |
| Featherweight | Akbar Abdullaev | def. | Ibragim Dauev | TKO (punches) | 3 | 3:49 | (Note: Abdullaev missed weight (158.75 lb).) |
| Bantamweight Muay Thai | Rambolek Chor.Ajalaboon | def. | Dmitrii Kovtun | TKO (punch) | 2 | 2:01 |
| Lightweight | Tye Ruotolo | def. | Adrian Lee | Submission (rear-naked choke) | 2 | 4:14 |
| Flyweight Muay Thai | Johan Ghazali | def. | Zakaria El Jamari | TKO (punches and elbow) | 1 | 2:10 |
| Women's Atomweight | Natalie Salcedo | def. | Macarena Aragon | Submission (triangle keylock) | 1 | 2:42 |
| Flyweight Kickboxing | Hyu Iwata | def. | Jhordan Estupiñan | TKO (punches) | 3 | 1:45 |

== Bonus awards ==
The following fighters received $50,000 bonuses:

- Performance of the Night: Shadow Singha Mawynn, Tye Ruotolo and Hyu Iwata

== See also ==
- 2025 in ONE Championship
- List of ONE Championship events
- List of current ONE fighters
- ONE Championship Rankings
