= Stella Hemetsberger =

Austrian kickboxer (born 1999)

- Born: January 28, 1999 (age 27); Vienna, Austria
- Height: 1.70 m (5 ft 7 in)
- Weight: 57 kg (126 lb; 9.0 st)
- Stance: Orthodox
- Fighting out of: Salzburg, Austria
- Team: RS-GYM
- Trainer: Roland Schwarz

Kickboxing record
- Total: 13
- Wins: 11
- By knockout: 4
- Losses: 2

Stella Hemetsberger (born January 28, 1999) is an Austrian kickboxer and Muay Thai fighter. She is currently signed to ONE Championship, where she is the reigning Women’s Strawweight Muay Thai World Champion.

As of March 2024, she was the No. 5 ranked −57.5 kg kickboxer in the world by Beyond Kickboxing.

== Biography and career ==
Stella Hemetsberger was born in Vienna in 1999 and grew up in Salzburg. She started to train in Muay Thai in 2012 at the RS-GYM Salzburg club under coach Roland Schwarz. She is a mechanical engineering graduate.

She started to compete as an amateur in 2016 and became Austria K-1 champion the next year.

Hemetsberger faced Francesca Prescimone at KOK 109 in Vienna on February 18, 2023. She lost the fight by unanimous decision.

On February 24, 2024, Hemetsberger faced reigning WAKO Pro K-1 European champion Débora Évora at UAM Fight Night K1-PRO in Abu Dhabi. She won the fight by split decision.

Hemetsberger made her RWS debut on March 23, 2024, against Gisele Werth. She won the bout via unanimous decision.

Hemetsberger made her ONE Championship debut on October 4, 2024, at ONE Friday Fights 82. She faced Chellina Chirino. She won the bout via unanimous decision.

Hemetsberger faced Anna Lia Moretti on March 7, 2025, at ONE Friday Fights 99. She won the bout via unanimous decision.

Hemetsberger faced Vanessa Romanowski on April 11, 2025, at ONE Friday Fights 104. She won the bout via KO, dropping Romanowski with a head kick.

Hemetsberger faced Jackie Buntan on September 5, 2025, at ONE Fight Night 35. The bout was for the vacant ONE Women's Strawweight Muay Thai Championship. She won the bout via unanimous decision, dropping Buntan twice in the opening round.

== Championships and accomplishments ==
=== Professional ===
- ONE Championship
  - 2025 ONE Women's Strawweight Muay Thai World Champion (One time, current)
    - One successful title defense
  - 2026 ONE Women's Strawweight Kickboxing World Championship (One time, current)

=== Amateur ===
- World Association of Kickboxing Organizations
  - 2023 WAKO World Championship K-1 -60 kg (gold)
  - 2023 WAKO Hungarian World Cup K-1 -60 kg (gold)
  - 2023 WAKO Italian World Cup K-1 -60 kg Winner
  - 2022 WAKO Hungarian World Cup K-1 -60 kg (gold)
  - 2021 WAKO World Championships K-1 -60 kg (silver)
  - 2021 WAKO Hungarian World Cup K-1 -60 kg (gold)
  - 2019 WAKO World Championships K-1 -60 kg (bronze)
  - 2017 WAKO European Championships K-1 Older Junior −60 kg (gold)
- World Games
  - 2022 World Games Kickboxing −60 kg (gold)
- International Federation of Muaythai Associations
  - 2023 IFMA European Championship −60 kg (bronze)

== Fight record ==
Professional Kickboxing and Muay Thai record
11 Wins (4 (T)KO's), 2 Losses, 0 Draw, 0 No Contests
Date	Result	Opponent	Event	Location	Method	Round	Time
2026-08-15	Win	(Russia) Natalia Diachkova	ONE Fight Night 46	Bangkok, Thailand	KO (Body kick and punches)	3	1:46
Defends the ONE Women's Strawweight Muay Thai World Championship.
2026-02-14	Win	(United States) Jackie Buntan	ONE Fight Night 40	Bangkok, Thailand	Decision (Split)	5	3:00
Wins the ONE Women's Strawweight Kickboxing World Championship.
2025-09-05	Win	(United States) Jackie Buntan	ONE Fight Night 35	Bangkok, Thailand	Decision (Unanimous)	5	3:00
Wins the vacant ONE Women's Strawweight Muay Thai World Championship.
2025-04-11	Win	(Poland) Vanessa Romanowski	ONE Friday Fights 104, Lumpinee Stadium	Bangkok, Thailand	KO (High kick)	1	1:44
2025-03-07	Win	(Italy) Anna Lia Moretti	ONE Friday Fights 99, Lumpinee Stadium	Bangkok, Thailand	Decision (Unanimous)	3	3:00
2024-10-04	Win	(Netherlands) Chellina Chirino	ONE Friday Fights 82, Lumpinee Stadium	Bangkok, Thailand	Decision (Unanimous)	3	3:00
2024-03-23	Win	(Netherlands) Gisele Werth	Rajadamnern World Series	Bangkok, Thailand	Decision (Unanimous)	3	2:00
2024-02-24	Win	(Portugal) Débora Évora	UAM Fight Night K1-PRO	Abu Dhabi, UAE	Decision (Split)	3	3:00
2023-02-18	Loss	(Italy) Francesca Prescimone	KOK 109	Vienna, Austria	Decision (Unanimous)	3	3:00
2023-01-08	Win	(Thailand)		Thailand	TKO	1	
2022-09-29	Win	(United States) M.J Wells	Patong Stadium	Patong, Thailand	KO (Punches)	1	
2022-04-23	Loss	(Germany) Johanna Rögner	Vendetta Fight Nights 27	Vienna, Austria	Decision (Unanimous)	3	3:00
Legend: Win Loss Draw/No contest Notes

Amateur Kickboxing and Muay Thai record
Date	Result	Opponent	Event	Location	Method	Round	Time
2024-11-09	Loss	(Turkey) Kübra Kocakuş	IFMA 2024 European Championships, Quarterfinals	Patras, Greece	Decision (30:27)	3	3:00
2024-11-05	Loss	(Portugal) Sofia Oliveira	2024 WAKO European Championships, Quarterfinals	Athens, Greece	Decision (2:1)	3	2:00
2024-06-05	Loss	(Turkey) Kübra Kocakuş	IFMA 2024 World Championships, Quarterfinals	Patras, Greece	TKO	1	
2024-06-01	Win	(Hungary) Ajs Adel Sandorfi	IFMA 2024 World Championships, First Round	Patras, Greece	Decision (30:27)	3	3:00
2023-12-12	Loss	(Turkey) Kübra Kocakuş	IFMA European Championship 2023, Semi-finals	Antalya, Turkey	Decision (29:28)	3	3:00
Wins the 2023 IFMA European Championship −60kg Bronze Medal.
2023-12-11	Win	(Hungary) Ajsa Adel Sandorfi	IFMA European Championship 2023, Quarterfinals	Antalya, Turkey	Decision (30:27)	3	3:00
2023-11-	Win	(Turkey) Devrim Aydin	2023 WAKO World Championships, Final	Albufeira, Portugal	Decision (3:0)	3	2:00
Wins the 2023 WAKO World Championship −60kg Gold Medal.
2023-11-	Win	(United States) Elizabeth Helton	2023 WAKO World Championships, Semi-finals	Albufeira, Portugal	Decision (3:0)	3	2:00
2023-11-	Win	(Australia) Savannah Kincses	2023 WAKO World Championships, Quarterfinals	Albufeira, Portugal	Decision (3:0)	3	2:00
2023-09-29	Win	(Finland) Emmi Saarela	2023 WAKO Italian World Cup, Final	Jesolo, Italy	Decision (3:0)	3	2:00
Wins the 2023 WAKO Italian World Cup −60kg title.
2023-09-28	Win	(Finland) Miina Sirikeoja	2023 WAKO Italian World Cup, Semi-finals	Jesolo, Italy	Decision (2:1)	3	2:00
2023-07-23	Win	(Slovakia) Viktoria Docekalova	EUSA Combat Games 2023, Final	Zagreb, Croatia	Decision (3:0)	3	2:00
2023-07-22	Win	(Portugal) Sofia Oliveira	EUSA Combat Games 2023, Semi-finals	Zagreb, Croatia	Decision (2:0)	3	2:00
2023-07-21	Win	(France) Mélina Rantin	EUSA Combat Games 2023, Quarterfinals	Zagreb, Croatia	Decision (3:0)	3	2:00
2023-06-	Win	(Ukraine) Alina Martyniuk	28th WAKO Hungarian World Cup, Final	Budapest, Hungary	Decision (3:0)	3	2:00
Wins 28th WAKO Hungarian World Cup K-1 -60kg Gold Medal.
2023-06-	Win	(Poland) Patrycja Płonka	28th WAKO Hungarian World Cup, Semi-finals	Budapest, Hungary	Decision (3:0)	3	2:00
2023-05-07	Loss	(Russia) Marina Bespalova	IFMA World Championship 2023, Quarterfinals	Bangkok, Thailand	Decision (29:28)	3	3:00
2022-07-14	Win	(Serbia) Milana Bjelogrlić	2022 World Games, Kickboxing Tournament, Final	Birmingham, Alabama, US	Decision (3:0)	3	2:00
Wins the 2022 World Games Kickboxing −60kg Gold Medal.
2022-07-13	Win	(Ukraine) Alina Martyniuk	2022 World Games – Kickboxing Tournament, Semi-finals	Birmingham, Alabama, US	Decision (2:1)	3	2:00
2022-07-13	Win	(Finland) Katja Poyhonen	2022 World Games – Kickboxing Tournament, Quarterfinals	Birmingham, Alabama, US	Decision (3:0)	3	2:00
2022-06-05	Win	(Belgium) Hélène Connart	27th WAKO Hungarian World Cup, Final	Budapest, Hungary	Decision (3:0)	3	2:00
Wins 27th WAKO Hungarian World Cup K-1 -60kg Gold Medal.
2022-06-04	Win	(Portugal) Sofia Oliveira	27th WAKO Hungarian World Cup, Semi-finals	Budapest, Hungary	Decision (3:0)	3	2:00
2022-06-03	Win	(Ukraine) Alina Martyniuk	27th WAKO Hungarian World Cup, Quarterfinals	Budapest, Hungary	Decision (3:0)	3	2:00
2021-10-	Loss	(Serbia) Milana Bjelogrlić	2021 WAKO World Championships, Final	Jesolo, Italy	Decision (3:0)	3	2:00
Wins 2021 WAKO World Championships K-1 -60kg Silver Medal.
2021-10-	Win	(Portugal) Sofia Oliveira	2021 WAKO World Championships, Semi-finals	Jesolo, Italy	Decision (2:1)	3	2:00
2021-10-	Win	(Belgium) Hélène Connart	2021 WAKO World Championships, Quarterfinals	Jesolo, Italy	Decision (3:0)	3	2:00
2021-10-	Win	(Russia) Anastasia Zharova	2021 WAKO World Championships, First Round	Jesolo, Italy	Decision (3:0)	3	2:00
2021-09-19	Win	(Romania) Andreea Cebuc	26th WAKO Hungarian World Cup, Final	Budapest, Hungary	Decision (3:0)	3	2:00
Wins the 26th WAKO Hungarian World Cup K-1 -60kg Gold Medal.
2021-09-18	Win	(Ukraine) Alina Martyniuk	26th WAKO Hungarian World Cup, Semi-finals	Budapest, Hungary	Decision (3:0)	3	2:00
2021-09-17	Win	(Finland) Katja Poyhonen	26th WAKO Hungarian World Cup, Quarterfinals	Budapest, Hungary	Decision (3:0)	3	2:00
2021-05-15	Loss	(Serbia) Milana Bjelogrlić	2021 WAKO Serbia Open European Cup, Final	Belgrade, Serbia	Decision (3:0)	3	2:00
Wins 2021 WAKO Serbia Open European Cup K-1 -60kg Silver Medal.
2021-05-15	Win	(Serbia) Selena Ivanović	2021 WAKO Serbia Open European Cup, Final	Belgrade, Serbia	Decision (3:0)	3	2:00
2020-02-28	Win	(Republic of Ireland) Deidre Beigley	2020 WAKO Irish Open, Final	Dublin, Ireland	Decision (3:0)	3	2:00
2020-02-28	Win	(Finland) Katja Poyhonen	2020 WAKO Irish Open, Semi-finals	Dublin, Ireland	Decision (2:1)	3	2:00
2019-10-	Loss	(Russia) Kristina Ismailova	2019 WAKO World Championships, Semi-finals	Sarajevo, Bosnia and Herzegovina	Decision (2:1)	3	2:00
Wins 2019 WAKO World Championship K-1 -60kg Bronze Medal.
2019-10-	Win	(Slovakia) Lucia Cmarova	2019 WAKO World Championships, Quarterfinals	Sarajevo, Bosnia and Herzegovina	Decision (3:0)	3	2:00
2019-10-	Win	(Italy) Marika Pagliaroli	2019 WAKO World Championships, First Round	Sarajevo, Bosnia and Herzegovina	Decision (3:0)	3	2:00
2019-09-28	Win	(Slovakia) Lucia Cmarova	2019 WAKO K-1 World Grand Prix, Semi-finals	Prague, Czech Republic	Decision (3:0)	3	2:00
2019-09-27	Win	(Estonia) Astrid Grents	2019 WAKO K-1 World Grand Prix, Quarterfinals	Prague, Czech Republic	Decision (3:0)	3	2:00
2019-07-23	Loss	(Germany) Viktorija Molcanova	IFMA World Championship 2019, First Round	Bangkok, Thailand	Decision (29:28)	3	3:00
2019-05-18	Loss	(Netherlands) Sarel de Jong	2019 Hungarian K-1 Kickboxing World Cup, Semi-final	Budapest, Hungary	Decision	3	2:00
2018-11-	Loss	(Croatia) Monika Babic	2018 WAKO European Championships, Quarterfinals	Bratislava, Slovakia	Decision (3:0)	3	2:00
2017-09-	Win	(Serbia) Jelena Ilic	2017 WAKO European Championships, Semi-finals	Skopje, North Macedonia	Decision (2:1)	3	2:00
Wins 2017 WAKO European Championship Older Junior K-1 -60kg Gold Medal.
2017-09-	Win	(Poland) Alina Stasiak	2017 WAKO European Championship, Semi-finals	Skopje, North Macedonia	Decision (3:0)	3	2:00
Legend: Win Loss Draw/No contest Notes

== See also ==
- List of female kickboxers
