= Veronica Vernocchi =

Italian Muay Thai fighter

- Born: Veronica Vernocchi; August 27, 1978 (age 48); Genoa, Italy
- Other names: Ringhio
- Nationality: (Italy) Italian
- Height: 1.60 m (5 ft 3 in)
- Weight: 56.0 kg (123.5 lb; 8.82 st)
- Division: Flyweight
- Style: Muay Thai, Kickboxing, Boxing
- Trainer: Luca Cuccu

Veronica Vernocchi (born August 27, 1978) is an Italian female Muay Thai fighter and Kickboxer artist, based in Genoa, Italy.

== Championships and awards ==
=== Kickboxing ===
- 2013 - WKA Kickboxing World Champion
- 2013 - Championships Oktagon
- 2012 - Championships Oktagon
- 2011 - FIKBMS Italian Championships | 1st Series Low Kick (gold)

=== Muay Thai ===
- 2015 - ISKA Muay Thai Europe Champion
- 2013 - ISKA Muay Thai World Champion
- 2012 - FIKBMS Italian Championships | 1st Series Muay Thai (gold)

== Kickboxing record ==
Professional Kickboxing record
Date	Result	Opponent	Event	Location	Method	Round	Time	Record
2016-04-16	Loss	(Netherlands) Denise Kielholtz	Bellator Kickboxing 1	Turin, Italy	Decision (split)	3	3:00	15–1
2009-11-07	Win	(Italy) Valentina Carraro	Golden League VI	Genoa, Italy	Points			
2009-05-30	Loss	(France) Anne-Laure Gaudry	International France vs Italy Gala	Genoa, Italy	Points			
2009-04-10	Win	(Italy) Valentina Carraro	Night Fighters	Genoa, Italy	Points			
Legend: Win Loss Draw/No contest Notes
