= Hélène Connart =

Belgian kickboxer

- Born: December 17, 1988 (age 37); Belgium
- Height: 163 cm (5 ft 4 in)
- Weight: 57 kg (126 lb; 9.0 st)
- Style: Kickboxing
- Stance: Orthodox
- Fighting out of: Brussels, Belgium
- Team: Naito Gym Brussels
- Trainer: Houtman Ouahabi; Mohamed Benyaich

Professional boxing record
- Total: 7
- Wins: 5
- By knockout: 4
- Losses: 1
- By knockout: 0
- Draws: 1

Kickboxing record
- Total: 26
- Wins: 19
- By knockout: 6
- Losses: 6
- Draws: 1

Other information
- Boxing record from BoxRec

Hélène Connart (born December 17, 1988) is a Belgian kickboxer and boxer. She is a former ISKA Oriental rules World feathwerweight champion.

As of November 2023, she was the #8 ranked -57.5 kg kickboxer in the world by Beyond Kickboxing.

== Career ==
Connart had her first opportunity to capture a world title on October 3, 2020, when she faced Chellina Chirino for the vacant Enfusion Featherweight belt. She lost the fight by decision after five rounds.

On March 28, 2021, Connart faced Nina van Dalum for the vacant ISKA K-1 European Super-featherweight title in Brussels, Belgium. She won the fight by unanimous decision.

Connart and Nina van Dalum rematched for the vacant Enfusion -57 kg title at Enfusion 102 on September 5, 2021. She won the fight by decision.

Connart captured her second ISKA title on December 18, 2021, at the King of Brussels event when she defeated Ella Maria Grapperhaus by unanimous decision to capture the vacant Oriental rules Featherweight world title.

== Championships and accomplishments ==
=== Kickboxing ===
==== Professional ====
- Enfusion
  - 2022 Enfusion World Flyweight (-57kg) Championship
- International Sport Kickboxing Association
  - 2021 ISKA K-1 European Super Featherweight (-59 kg) Championship
  - 2021 ISKA Oriental rules World Featherweight (-57 kg) Championship

==== Amateur ====
- World Association of Kickboxing Organizations
  - 2022 WAKO European Cup Karlovac Open K-1 -60 kg 🥈
  - 2022 WAKO Hungarian World Cup K-1 -60 kg 🥈
  - 2023 WAKO Hungarian World Cup K-1 -65 kg 🥇

== Professional boxing record ==
7 fights	5 wins	1 loss
By knockout	4	0
By decision	1	1
Draws	1	

No.	Result	Record	Opponent	Type	Round, time	Date	Location	Notes
7	Draw	5–1–1	Clara Lopez	SD	10	Jun 6, 2026	Comunidad Valenciana, Villarreal, Centro de Tecnificacion Deportiva, Spain	For the vacant EBU European Super Lightweight title
6	Win	5–1	Eva Cantos	UD	8	May 9, 2026	Hainaut, Morlanwelz, Salle Baume Marpent, Belgium	
5	Win	4–1	Adrianna Jedrzejczyk	TKO	5 (8), 0:46	Nov 15, 2025	Mazurkas Conference Center, Best Western Hotel Mazurkas, Poland	Won vacant WBC International Super Lightweight title
4	Win	3–1	Joice Alves dos Santos	TKO	6 (8)	Jun 6, 2025	Hainaut, Flobecq, Belgium	
3	Win	2–1	Ksenija Medic	TKO	3 (6)	Apr 26, 2025	Liege, La Préalle, Belgium	
2	Win	1–1	Adelaide Mary	TKO	2 (6), 1:18	Dec 14, 2024	Hainaut, Mons, Belgium	
1	Loss	0–1	Marcelat Sakobi	UD	6	Sep 28, 2024	Walloon Brabant, Tubize, Belgium	

== Kickboxing record ==
Professional Kickboxing record
19 Wins (6 (T)KO's), 6 Losses, 1 Draw, 0 No Contest
Date	Result	Opponent	Event	Location	Method	Round	Time
2024-02-08	Loss	(Israel) Nili Block	Lidon vs Benzaquen	Paris, France	TKO (Doctor stoppage)	3	3:00
For the vacant ISKA Oriental rules World Lightweight (-61kg) title.
2023-11-18	Win	(France) Christelle Barbot	La Nuit des Champions 30	Marseille, France	Decision	3	3:00
2022-12-17	Win	(Italy) Francesca Prescimone	King Of Brussels	Brussels, Belgium	Decision	3	3:00
2022-09-17	Loss	(Netherlands) Nina van Dalum	Enfusion 110	Alkmaar, Netherlands	Decision	5	3:00
Loses the Enfusion World Flyweight (-57kg) Championship.
2022-05-01	Loss	(Greece) Antonia Prifti	Thaiboxing Discovery Event	Wavre, Belgium	Decision (Unanimous)	3	3:00
2022-03-26	Win	(Spain) Laura de Blaes	Fight 4 Respect 4	Brussels, Belgium	KO	3	
2021-12-18	Win	(Netherlands) Ella Maria Grapperhaus	King of Brussels	Schaerbeek, Belgium	Decision (Unanimous)	5	3:00
Wins the vacant ISKA Oriental rules World Featherweight (-57kg) Championship.
2021-09-05	Win	(Netherlands) Nina van Dalum	Enfusion 102	Alkmaar, Netherlands	Decision	5	3:00
Wins the vacant Enfusion World Flyweight (-57kg) Championship.
2021-06-20	Win	(France) Nawel Vanweyenberg	Fight 4 Respect 2	Brussels, Belgium	TKO	3	
2021-03-28	Win	(Netherlands) Nina van Dalum	Fight Covid 2	Brussels, Belgium	Decision (Unanimous)	5	3:00
Wins the vacant ISKA K-1 European Super Featherweight (-59kg) Championship.
2021-02-21	Loss	(Netherlands) Ella Maria Grapperhaus	Sportifs Sous Statut ADEPS	Chapelle-lez-Herlaimont, Belgium	Decision	5	3:00
For the vacant ISKA K-1 European Featherweight (-57kg) Championship.
2020-12-12	Win	(Netherlands) Miranda Zondervan	Fight Covid	Brussels, Belgium	Decision	3	3:00
2020-10-03	Loss	(Netherlands) Chellina Chirino	Enfusion 98	Alkmaar, Netherlands	Decision	5	3:00
For the vacant Enfusion World Flyweight (-57kg) Championship.
2020-01-25	Win	(Belgium) Kelly Danioko	King of Brussels	Brussels, Belgium	KO (Punches + knee)	2	
Wins the vacant BKBMO Belgium K-1 -59kg title.
2019-12-07	Win	(France) Jéromine Moser	Pegasus Fight	Morges, Switzerland	Decision	3	3:00
2019-10-26	Win	(France) Diane Voituret	Fight Day	Trazegnies, Belgium	Decision	3	3:00
2019-10-05	Loss	(Sweden) Isa Tidblad	Golden Thaiboxing	Roskilde, Denmark	Decision	5	3:00
For the vacant WCTS Word title.
2018-09-18	Win	(Netherlands) Gina Hooglugt	Enfusion Talents 57	Antwerp, Netherlands	Decision	3	3:00
Legend: Win Loss Draw/No contest Notes

Amateur Kickboxing record
Date	Result	Opponent	Event	Location	Method	Round	Time
2023-06-18	Win	(Czech Republic) Sarka Melinova	28th WAKO Hungarian World Cup, Final	Budapest, Hungary	Decision (2:1)	3	2:00
Wins WAKO Hungarian World Cup K-1 -65kg Gold Medal.
2023-06-17	Win	(Israel) Naomi Eytan	28th WAKO Hungarian World Cup, Semifinal	Budapest, Hungary	Decision (3:0)	3	2:00
2023-06-16	Win	(Poland) Aleksandra Niewiadomska	28th WAKO Hungarian World Cup, Quarterfinal	Budapest, Hungary	Decision (3:0)	3	2:00
2022-07-13	Loss	(Ukraine) Alina Martynuk	2022 World Games, Kickboxing Tournament Bronze Medal fight	Birmingham, Alabama, USA	Decision (2:1)	3	2:00
2022-07-13	Loss	(Serbia) Milana Bjelogrlic	2022 World Games, Kickboxing Tournament Semi Final	Birmingham, Alabama, USA	Decision (2:1)	3	2:00
2022-07-13	Win	(Portugal) Sofia Oliveira	2022 World Games, Kickboxing Tournament Quarter Final	Birmingham, Alabama, USA	Decision (2:1)	3	2:00
2022-06-05	Loss	(Austria) Stella Hemetsberger	27th WAKO Hungarian World Cup, Final	Budapest, Hungary	Decision (3:0)	3	2:00
Wins WAKO Hungarian World Cup K-1 -60kg Silver Medal.
2022-06-04	Win	(Denmark) Yara Saleh	27th WAKO Hungarian World Cup, Semi Final	Budapest, Hungary	Decision (3:0)	3	2:00
2022-06-03	Win	(Finland) Katya Poyhonen	27th WAKO Hungarian World Cup, Quarter Final	Budapest, Hungary	Decision (3:0)	3	2:00
2022-06-03	Win	(Sweden) Lina Saad	27th WAKO Hungarian World Cup, 1/8 Final	Budapest, Hungary	Decision (3:0)	3	2:00
2022-11-13	Loss	(Ukraine) Alina Martyniuk	2022 European Cup Karlovac Open, Final	Karlovac, Croatia	Decision (2:1)	3	2:00
Wins European Cup Karlovac Open K-1 -60kg Silver Medal.
2022-11-12	Win	(Finland) Katja Poyhonen	2022 European Cup Karlovac Open, Semifinal	Karlovac, Croatia	Decision (3:0)	3	2:00
2021-10-	Loss	(Austria) Stella Hemetsberger	2021 WAKO World Championships, Quarter Final	Jesolo, Italy	Decision (3:0)	3	2:00
2021-10-	Win	(Turkey) Sultan Unal	2021 WAKO World Championships, 1/8 Final	Jesolo, Italy	Decision (3:0)	3	2:00
Legend: Win Loss Draw/No contest Notes

== Mixed martial arts record ==
Professional record breakdown
1 match	0 wins	1 loss
By knockout	0	1

Res.	Record	Opponent	Method	Event	Date	Round	Time	Location	Notes
Loss	0–1	Antonia Prifti	KO (punch)	Bushido 87	March 11, 2023	1	2:10	Kraainem, Belgium	Flyweight debut.

== See also ==
- List of female kickboxers
