= Alboussière =

Alboussière Albossèira (Occitan)
- Commune
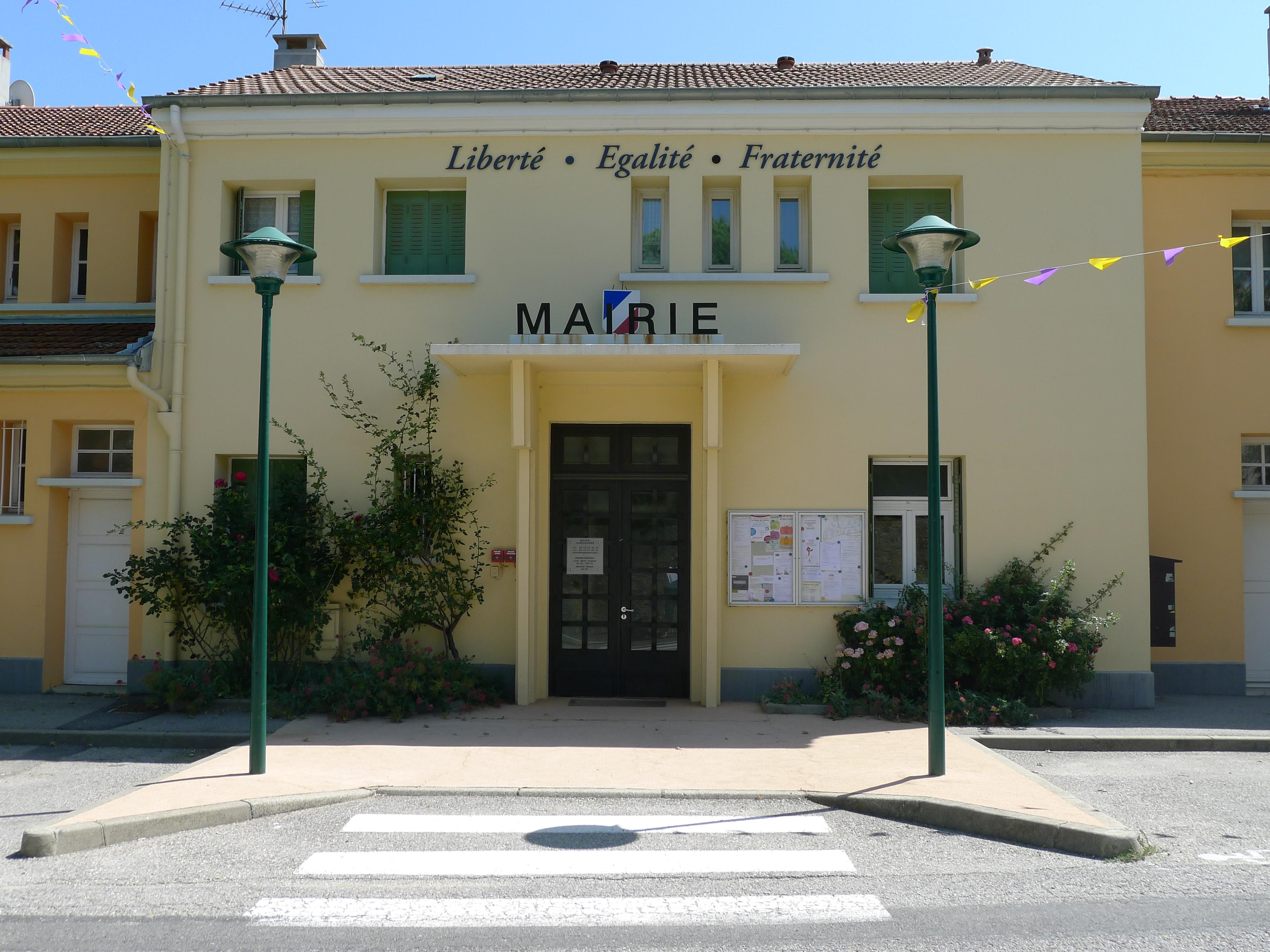
- Alboussière Town Hall

- Coat of arms
- Location of Alboussière
- Location within France Location within Auvergne-Rhône-Alpes
- Coordinates: 44°56′42″N 4°43′46″E
- Country: France
- Region: Auvergne-Rhône-Alpes
- Department: Ardèche
- Arrondissement: Tournon-sur-Rhône
- Canton: Haut-Vivarais
- Intercommunality: Rhône-Crussol

Government
  - Mayor (2020–2026): Michel Mizzi
- Area^{1}: 18.39 km^{2} (7.10 sq mi)
- Elevation: 548 m (1,798 ft)
- Highest elevation: 774 m (2,539 ft)
- Lowest elevation: 234 m (768 ft)
- Population (2023): 1,048
  - Density: 56.99/km^{2} (147.6/sq mi)
- Time zone: UTC+01:00 (CET)
  - Summer (DST): UTC+02:00 (CEST)
- INSEE/Postal code: 07007 /07440
- ^{1} French Land Register data, which excludes lakes, ponds, glaciers > 1 km^{2} (0.386 sq mi or 247 acres) and river estuaries.

Alboussière (French pronunciation: [albusjɛʁ]; Occitan: Albossèira) is a commune in the Ardèche department in the Auvergne-Rhône-Alpes region in Southern France.

== Geography ==
Alboussière is located some 10 km west of Valence and 10 km east of Lamastre. It can be accessed by the winding D533 road from Valence which passes through the village and continues west to Saint-Barthélemy-Grozon. The D14 road from Vernoux-en-Vivarais in the south also passes through the commune to join the D533 just north of the commune. The commune is also covered with a network of small roads. There are nine other hamlets in the commune other than the village. These are: Aubert, Blanc, Les Chatanelles, La Chalaye, Bleizac, Le Mas, Le Vivier, Ponsoye, and Fialaix.

There are numerous streams throughout the commune. The Ruisseau de Jergne forms most of the southern border and the Duzon forms much of the eastern boundary with large numbers of unnamed streams joining them.

=== Heraldry ===
Arms of Alboussière	Blazon: Party per pale, Azure a ram rampant Argent and barry of six Or and Vert.

== Administration ==
List of Successive Mayors

From	To	Name	Party
2001	2014	Jacques Dubay	UDI
2014	2020	Philippe Ponton	DVD
2020	Current	Michel Mizzi	

== Demographics ==
Historical population
Year	Pop.	±% p.a.
1968	700	—
1975	696	−0.08%
1982	605	−1.98%
1990	727	+2.32%
1999	756	+0.44%
2007	890	+2.06%
2012	1,004	+2.44%
2017	1,004	+0.00%
2023	1,048	+0.72%
Source: INSEE

The inhabitants of the commune are known as Alboussiérois (masculine) and Alboussiéroises (feminine) in French.

== Sites and monuments ==
- The Château de Crozat was enlarged in the 17th century then transformed by the architect Louis Achille Tracol in the 19th century.
- The Chapel of Saint-Didier-de-Crussol
- The Church of Saint-André-de-Crussol contains a statue: Saint-Evêque (19th century) which is registered as an historical object.
- The artificial lake
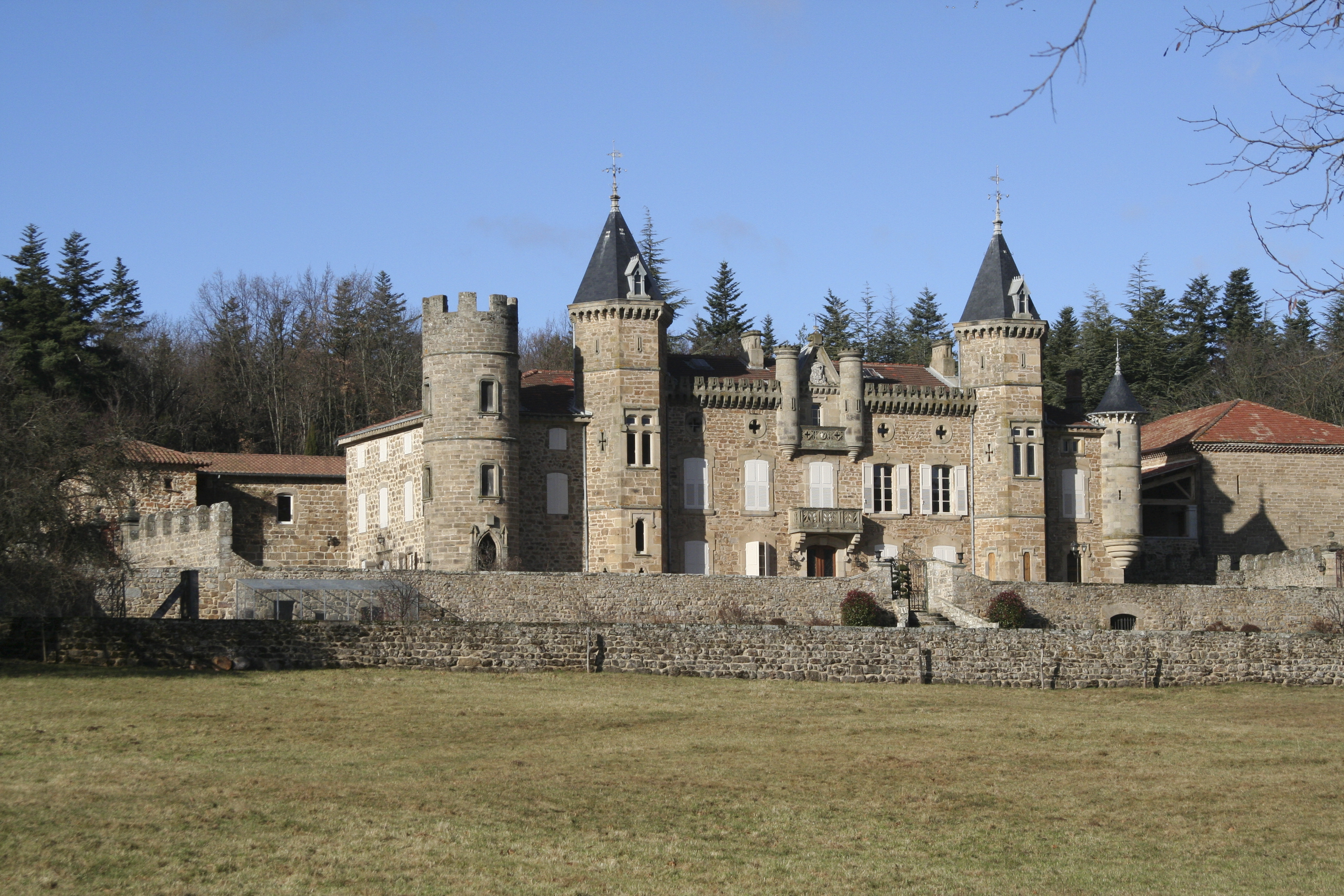
The Château de Crozat

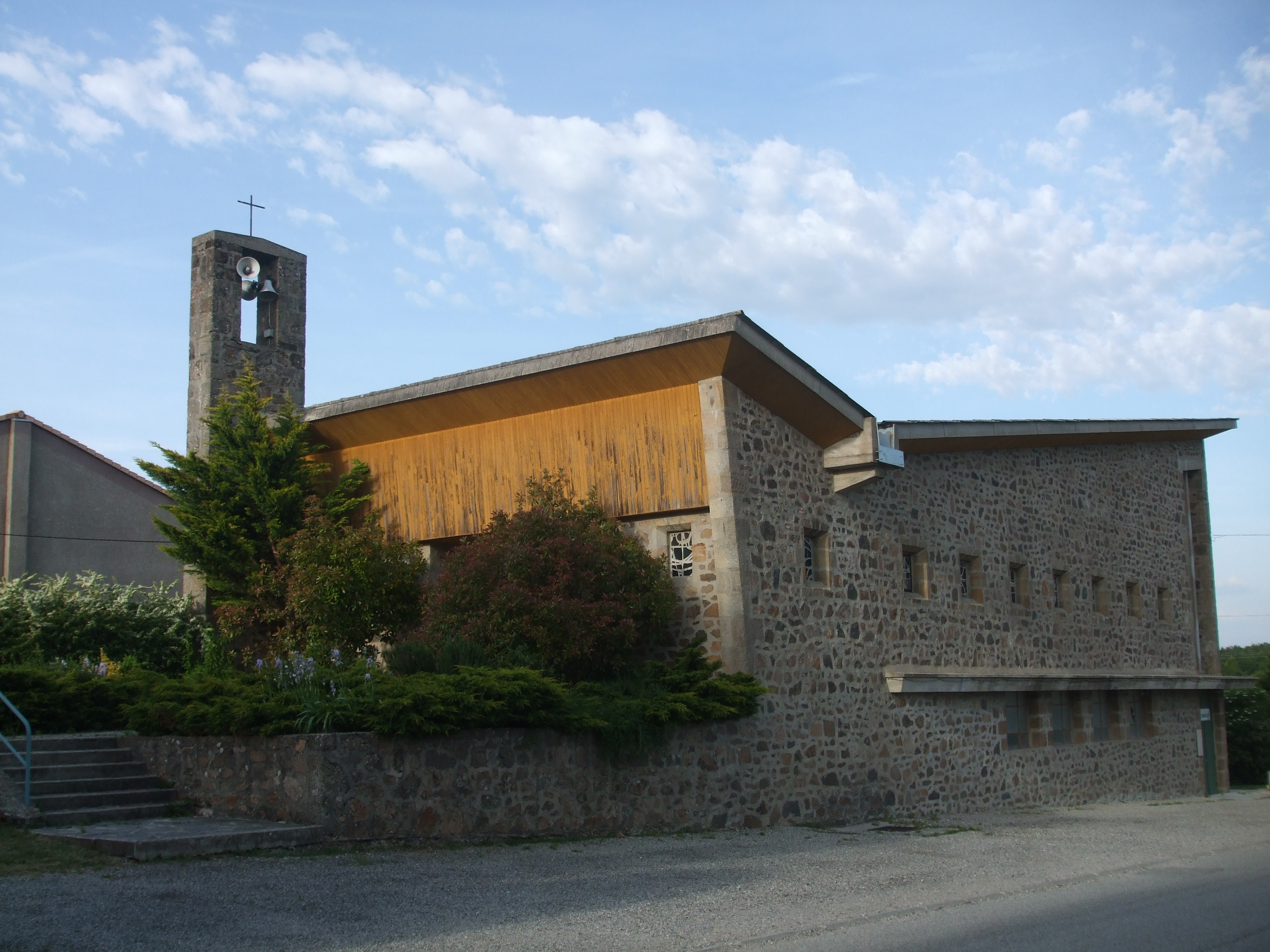
Modern village church

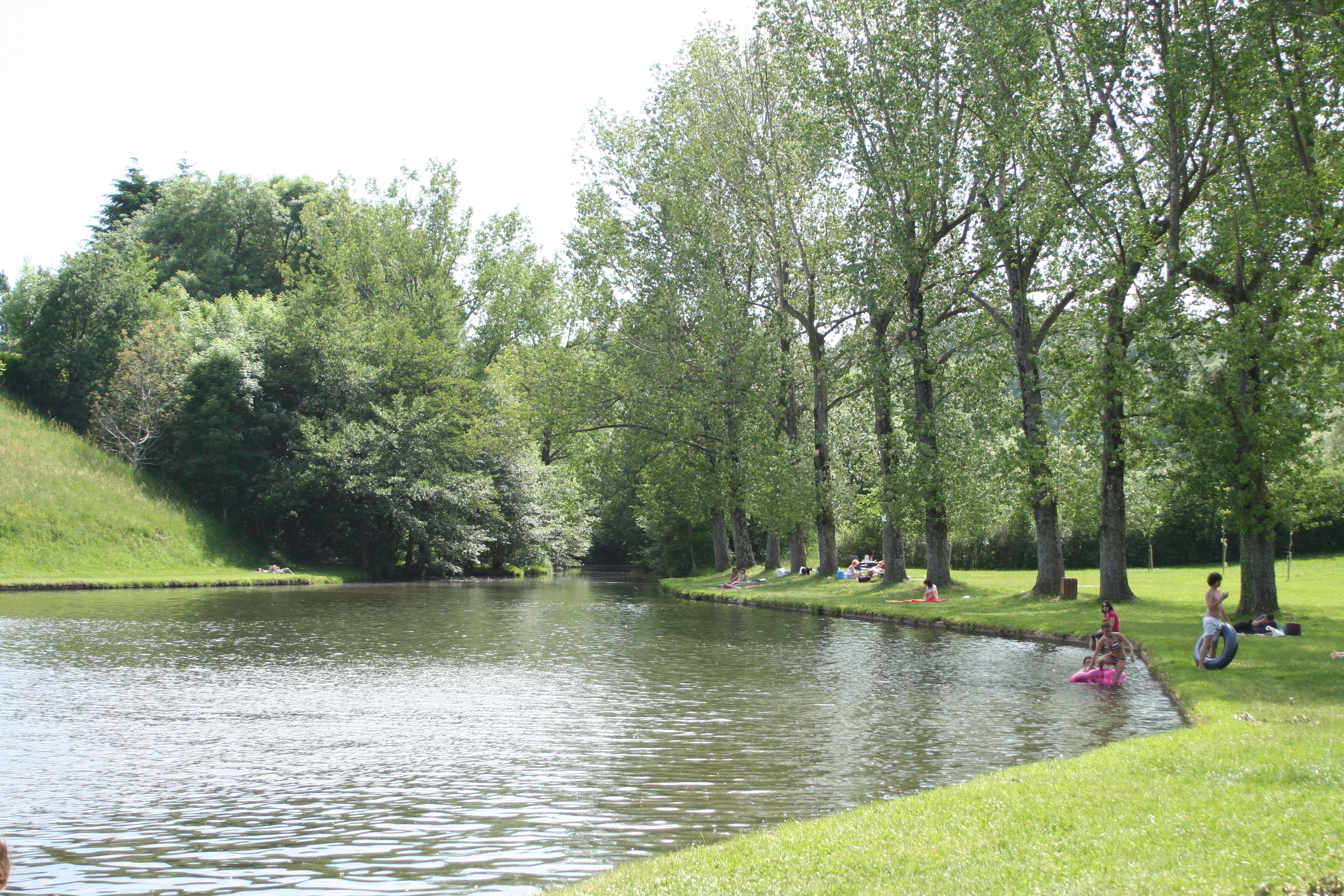
The Artificial lake at Alboussière

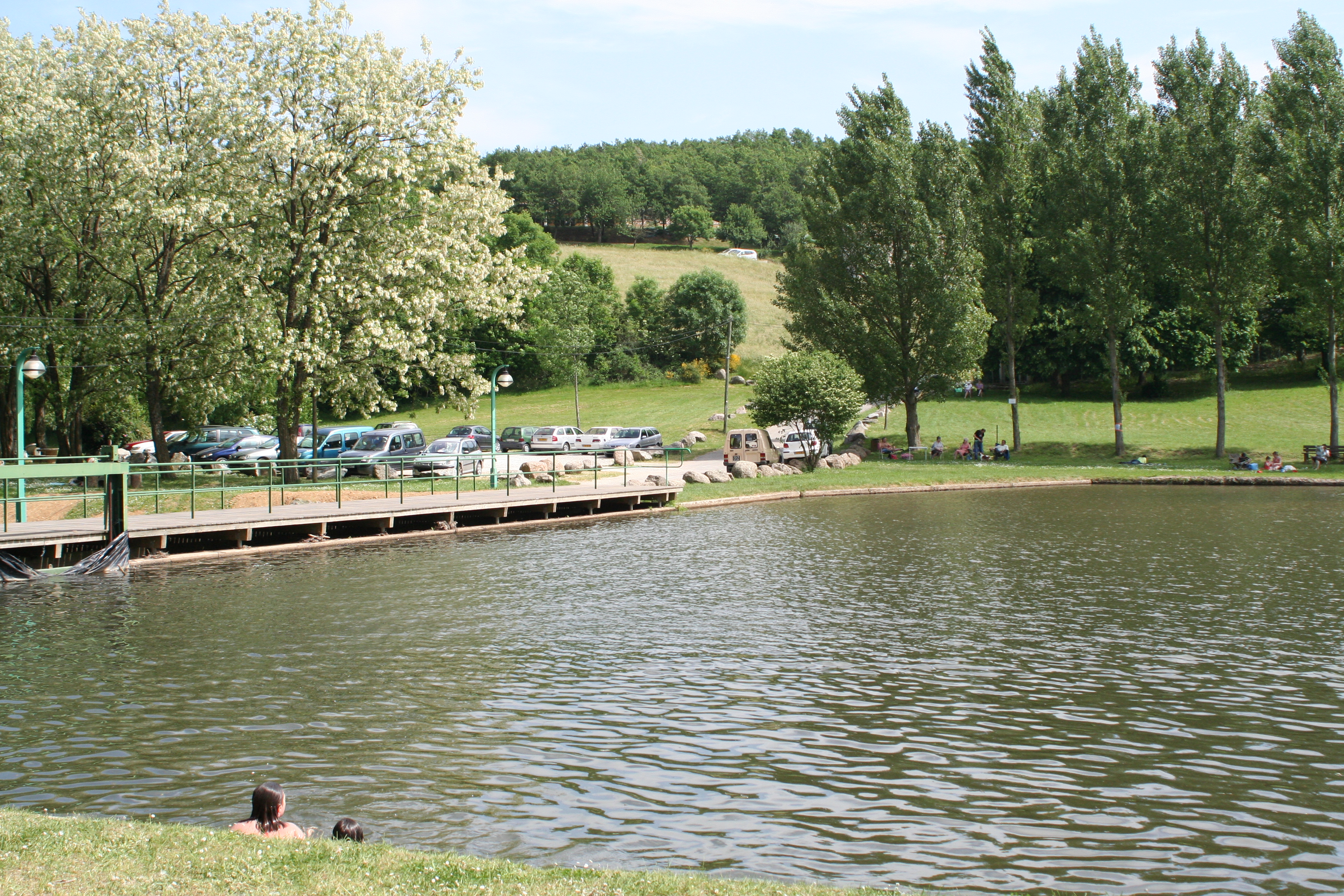
The Artificial lake at Alboussière

== Notable people linked to the commune ==
- Louis-Balthazard du Bay was born in the castle on 3 November 1775. He was, among others, Lord of Cros, Baron of Boffre, Mayor of Saint-Péray, and a member of the electoral college of the department of Ardèche.

== See also ==
- Communes of the Ardèche department
